= 2019 Houston Astros season =

58th season in Major League Baseball for the Houston Astros

2019 Houston Astros
- American League champions American League West champions
- League: American League
- Division: West
- Ballpark: Minute Maid Park
- City: Houston, Texas
- Record: 107–55 (.660)
- Divisional place: 1st
- Owners: Jim Crane
- General managers: Jeff Luhnow
- Managers: A. J. Hinch
- Television: AT&T SportsNet Southwest (Todd Kalas, Geoff Blum)
- Radio: Sportstalk 790; KTRH 740 (weekday night games); Houston Astros Radio Network (Robert Ford, Steve Sparks, Geoff Blum); KLAT (Spanish) (Francisco Romero, Alex Treviño)
- Stats: ESPN.com; Baseball Reference

The 2019 Houston Astros season was the 58th season for the Major League Baseball (MLB) franchise located in Houston, Texas, their 55th as the Astros, seventh in both the American League (AL) and AL West division, and 20th at Minute Maid Park. They entered the season as having set a franchise record with 103 wins, defending two-time AL West champions, both with 100 or more wins, an unprecedented feat for Houston. Having reached a second consecutive American League Championship Series (ALCS), their 2018 season ended in a 4-games-to-1 loss to the eventual World Series champion Boston Red Sox.

On March 28, Justin Verlander made his second Opening Day start for the Astros at Tropicana Field, who defeated the Tampa Bay Rays, 5–1. For the third consecutive season, six players represented Houston at the All-Star Game held at Progressive Field in Cleveland, the most in baseball, including four starters: Alex Bregman, Michael Brantley, Justin Verlander, and George Springer; pitchers Gerrit Cole and Ryan Pressly were also selected.

In his Astros debut on August 3, pitcher Aaron Sanchez started a combined no-hitter versus the Seattle Mariners, winning 9–0. On August 18, Zack Greinke earned his 200th career victory. On September 1, Verlander hurled his third career no-hitter, as 2–0 victors over the Toronto Blue Jays. Tying a major league record by a team in one season, the no-hitters were the 12th and 13th in club history. On September 18, the Astros clinched a postseason berth against the Texas Rangers, becoming the first team since the 2004 New York Yankees to assemble three successive 100-win campaigns, and, on September 22, captured a third consecutive division title.

Greinke came within two outs of a third no-hitter on September 25 as the Astros claimed a club-record 104th victory. Verlander recorded both his 3,000th career strikeout and 300th of the season on September 28, who, along with Cole, formed the second teammate duo to register 300 strikeouts, joining Randy Johnson and Curt Schilling of the 2002 Arizona Diamondbacks. Verlander led the AL in wins (21), while Cole led in strikeouts (326) and earned run average (2.50 ERA). For the first time in franchise history, the Astros led baseball with the best regular-season record of 107–55, while qualifying for their 13th playoff appearance—the fourth since moving to the American League—and 10th division title.

In the American League Division Series (ALDS), Houston prevailed over Tampa Bay by a margin of three-games-to-two. Next, the Astros dispatched New York in the ALCS, four-games-to-two, capped by ALCS Most Valuable Player Jose Altuve's deep series-ending, walk-off home run. Hence, the Astros earned their third league pennant and second World Series entrance in three years. However, the Washington Nationals surmounted Houston in seven games.

Following the season, Verlander became the fourth Astro to garner the Cy Young Award, and second of his career. The Astros led the league with a record six players selected to the inaugural All-MLB Team, including Altuve, Yordan Alvarez, Bregman, Cole, Greinke and Verlander. Bregman, Greinke, and Springer were each honored with Silver Slugger Awards, Greinke also earned a Gold Glove, and Alvarez was opted as the AL Rookie of the Year.

This was the Astros' final season with A. J. Hinch as manager and Jeff Luhnow as general manager; both were fired in January 2020 after MLB investigators confirmed that the team had used electronics to steal opponents’ signs back in the 2017 regular season.

== Off-season ==
The Astros concluded the 2018 season with an 103–59 (.636) record, as AL West division champions, and six games ahead of the runners-up Oakland Athletics. In the playoffs, Houston advanced to the American League Championship Series (ALCS) prior to their season ending in a 4-games-to-1 defeat to the eventual World Series champion Boston Red Sox. This was the Astros' second consecutive entrance into the ALCS, and sixth League Championship Series (LCS) qualification overall, as their first four, in 1980, 1986, 2004 and 2005, all occurred while they were members of the National League.

Following the 2018 season, the Houston Astros announced that their weekly night games would air on KTRH 740.

On March 24, 2019, the Astros signed right-handed pitcher Justin Verlander to a two-year, $66 million contract extension to keep him with Houston through the 2021 season.

The Astros unveiled their team Hall of Fame on March 25, 2019, located in Home Run Alley at Minute Maid Park. The inaugural induction class enshrined a total of sixteen members, including fourteen players and two broadcasters. Each were individually honored during a pre-game ceremony the following August 3 with their plaques mounted within the Hall of Fame exhibit. Among the oldest artefacts on display included Dizzy Dean's cleats from when he played for the Houston Buffaloes during the 1930s and home plate from Buffalo Stadium. The cleats and home plate accounted for two of more than 2,000 items pertaining to baseball in Houston assembled by team historian Mike Acosta, which would go into a future Houston baseball museum.

== Regular season ==
=== Summary ===
==== March—April ====
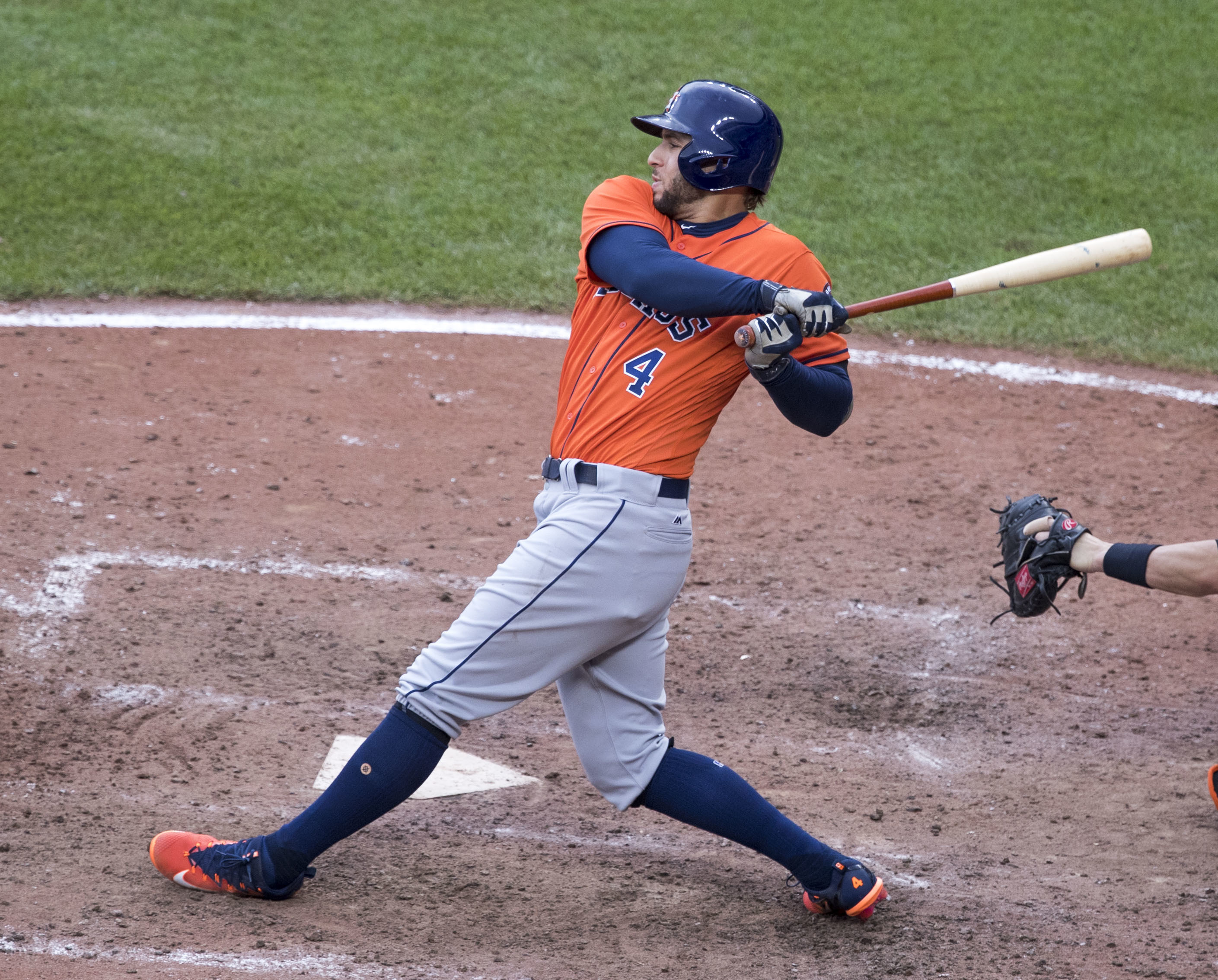
Opening Day leadoff hitter George Springer at bat.

Opening Day starting lineup
Uniform	Player	Position
4	George Springer	Right fielder
27	Jose Altuve	Second baseman
2	Alex Bregman	Third baseman
23	Michael Brantley	Left fielder
10	Yuli Gurriel	First baseman
13	Tyler White	Designated hitter
28	Robinson Chirinos	Catcher
16	Aledmys Díaz	Shortstop
6	Jake Marisnick	Center fielder
35	Justin Verlander	Pitcher
Venue: Tropicana Field • Final: Houston 5, Tampa Bay 1 Sources:

For Opening Day on March 28, the Tampa Bay Rays hosted the Astros at Tropicana Field, where Justin Verlander made his second Opening Day start for Houston, and 11th overall in his career.. Opposite Verlander was reigning Cy Young Award winner Blake Snell. The Astros won, 5–1, as each of George Springer (third inning), Michael Brantley (fourth), and Jose Altuve (fifth) all homered to back Verlander, who earned the victory. Verlander pitched 7 innings, surrendered 3 hits and struck out 9, earning a game score of 75. Springer's longball was his third in successive on Opening Day. Moreover, the triumph garnered a seven-Opening Day winning streak for Houston, a club-record, which extended to ten through 2022, tying an all-time Major League record.

On April 3 versus the Texas Rangers, Carlos Correa collected the 500th hit of his career. Correa doubled off Mike Minor for the milestone hit; however, the Rangers scored thrice off Gerrit Cole (0–2) and shut out the Astros, 4–0, who fell to 2–5.

From April 8 to 13, Jose Altuve homered in five consecutive games, which for qualified for a tie for second-most in club history, to Morgan Ensberg (6 consecutive) from April 15 to 21 2006. Ensberg surpassed five consecutive by Cliff Johnson (August 19 to 24, 1975), and Altuve's former teammate Carlos Beltrán (August 23 to 27, 2004). (Note: Criteria: Longest streak of consecutive games, Playing for HOU, in the regular season, requiring home runs ≥ 1, sorted by most games matching criteria.)

In April 9 game against the New York Yankees, Jose Altuve connected for his 100th career home run off Jonathan Loáisiga in a 6–3 win. Altuve became the 16th player in Astros history to reach 100 home runs.

On April 12, the Astros connected for two grand slams in a single game, the third time in franchise history they had done so, (Note: Previously on July 30, 1969, and on June 8, 2014.) to power a 10–6 triumph over the Seattle Mariners. George Springer hit a two-run home run in during the top of the third inning for the Astros' first runs. During the top of the sixth inning, Altuve connected for the second grand slam of his career, a go-ahead play for a 6–3 Houston advantage, and Yuli Gurriel hit the fourth of his career in the top of the eighth. Altuve for his first grand slam since August 17, 2014, while Gurriel's was his first since September 21, 2018.

Altuve swatted another home run the next night off Félix Hernández on April 13, homering for the fifth consecutive game and sixth home run in that span. Altuve was the first Astro to hit a home run in five consecutive games since Morgan Ensberg's franchise-record six consecutive games in 2006. Verlander, the starting pitcher, struck out eight of the first 10 batters that he faced and 11 of 20 overall. He allowed one run in six innings.

From April 20–30, Alex Bregman tied a club record by drawing at least one base on balls in each of 11 consecutive contests. Bregman drew 13 total walks with this active streak, while slashing .229 / .440 / .457 / .897. He also slammed 2 home runs. First achieved by Jimmy Wynn from July 6–15, 1969, Joe Morgan replicated the feat for Houston from July 6–20, 1970. (Note: The major league record is 22 by Roy Cullenbine, from July 2–22, 1947. Criteria: Longest streak of consecutive games, in the regular season, requiring bases on balls ≥ 1, sorted by most games matching criteria.)

During the month of April, Gerrit Cole recorded 65 strikeouts, the most in the major leagues since Clayton Kershaw also stuck out 65 in May 2016. (Note: In the regular season, from 2015 to 2019, for any choice in months, requiring strikeouts ≥ 50, sorted by greatest strikeouts.)

==== May ====
With rain seeping through the roof on Minute Maid Park on May 9, Josh Reddick singled in the game-tying run that led to a 4–2 win over Texas. Further, he robbed former Astro Hunter Pence of an imminent three-run blast. George Springer went 5-for-5 on May 12, including clubbing two home runs to lead a 15–5 win over the Rangers. The performance also helped Houston pull off a four-game sweep of Texas. Springer recorded five tallies for the second time in his career, and first since May 26, 2014. The five-hit, multi-homer bout was first of this type for Springer, the third five-hit contest of his career, and first since his six-hit performance on May 7, 2018.

From May 6 to 12, George Springer batted .510 (14-for-27) / .563 on-base percentage (OBP) / 1.148 slugging percentage (SLG) / 1.711 on-base plus slugging (OPS), 10 runs scored, five home runs, 10 RBI, and 31 total bases. Springer collected four multi-hit games. He was named American League (AL) Player of the Week for the week ended May 12.

On May 22, the Chicago White Sox routed the Astros, 9–4, including roughing up Gerrit Cole (4–5, 4.11 earned run average, ERA) for six runs over six frames, which saddled him with the loss. However, this was Cole's final defeat for remainder of the 2019 regular season, also Houston's 50th game of the year. Just twice over his final 22 starts did he yield more than two runs (four each). Cole was not charged with another defeat until Game 1 of the World Series later in the year, his fourth start in the playoffs, after having won each of the first three.

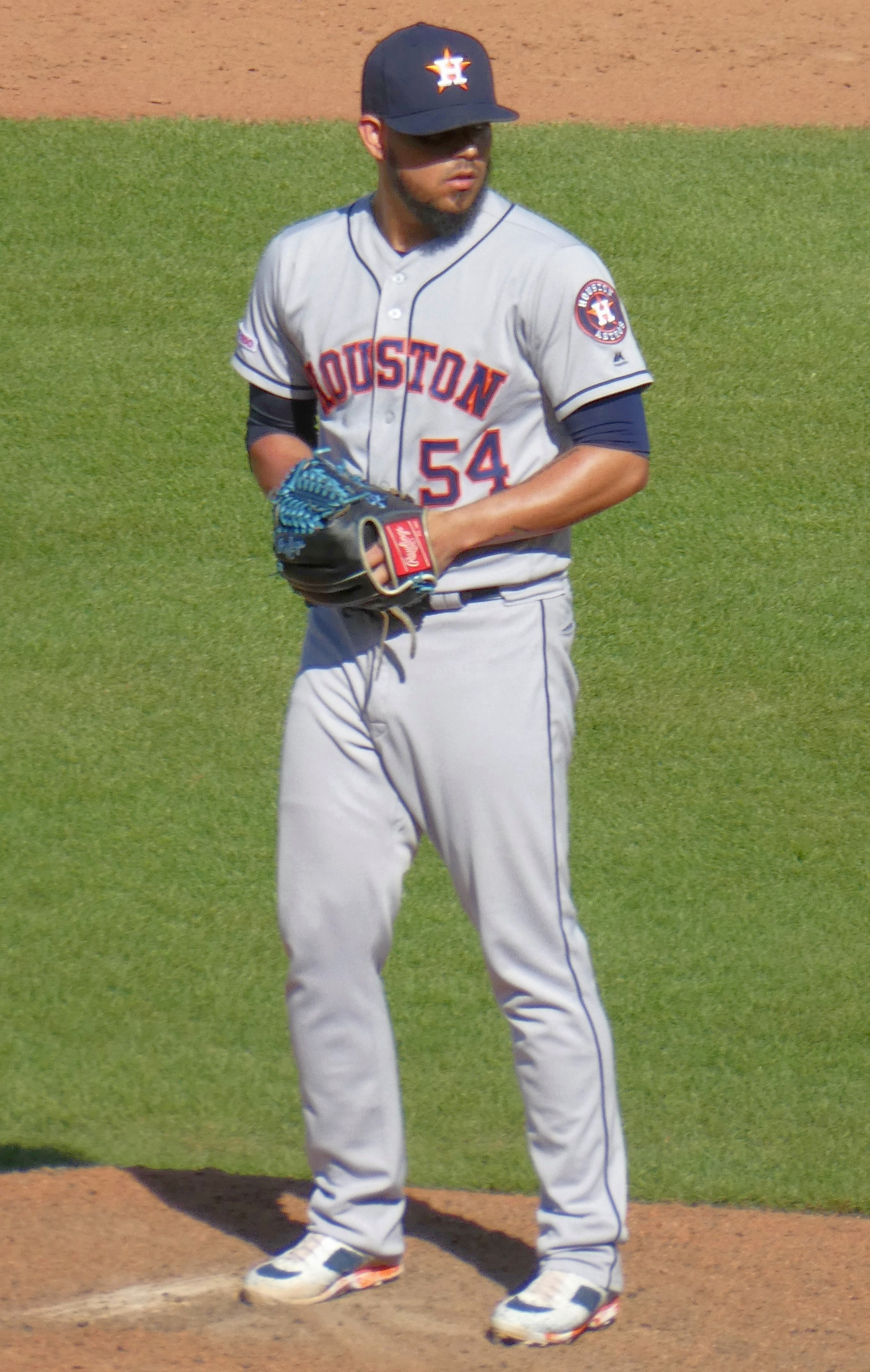
Right-hander Roberto Osuna readies to deliver a pitch.

Closer Roberto Osuna converted his 25th consecutive save on May 24, breaking a club record. The streak had started the previous August 18, surpassing Brad Lidge (24 consecutive from June 21–September 28, 2005). Osuna's feat remained the franchise longest until Josh Hader converted 29 consecutive from April 7 to August 29, 2024. (Note: Longest streak of consecutive games, playing for HOU, in the regular season, requiring saves ≥ 1, sorted by most games matching criteria.)

On May 28, A. J. Hinch obtained his 500th win as manager, as the Astros toppled the Chicago Cubs, 9–6. Chicago blasted five home runs, but Houston answered with five doubles—two by Jake Marisnick (8)—and two home runs by Alex Bregman (17). Bregman collected three RBI, and Michael Brantley had two hits and two RBI as Houston scored four times in the bottom of the fourth. Josh James (2–0) picked up the victory in relief while surrendering three runs over 2 1/3 frames.

With injuries stacking up, on May 29 shortstop Carlos Correa sustained a bruised rib during a massage session. He was forced to join fellow All-Stars Springer and Jose Altuve on the injured list (IL) and expected to miss four to six weeks.

==== June ====
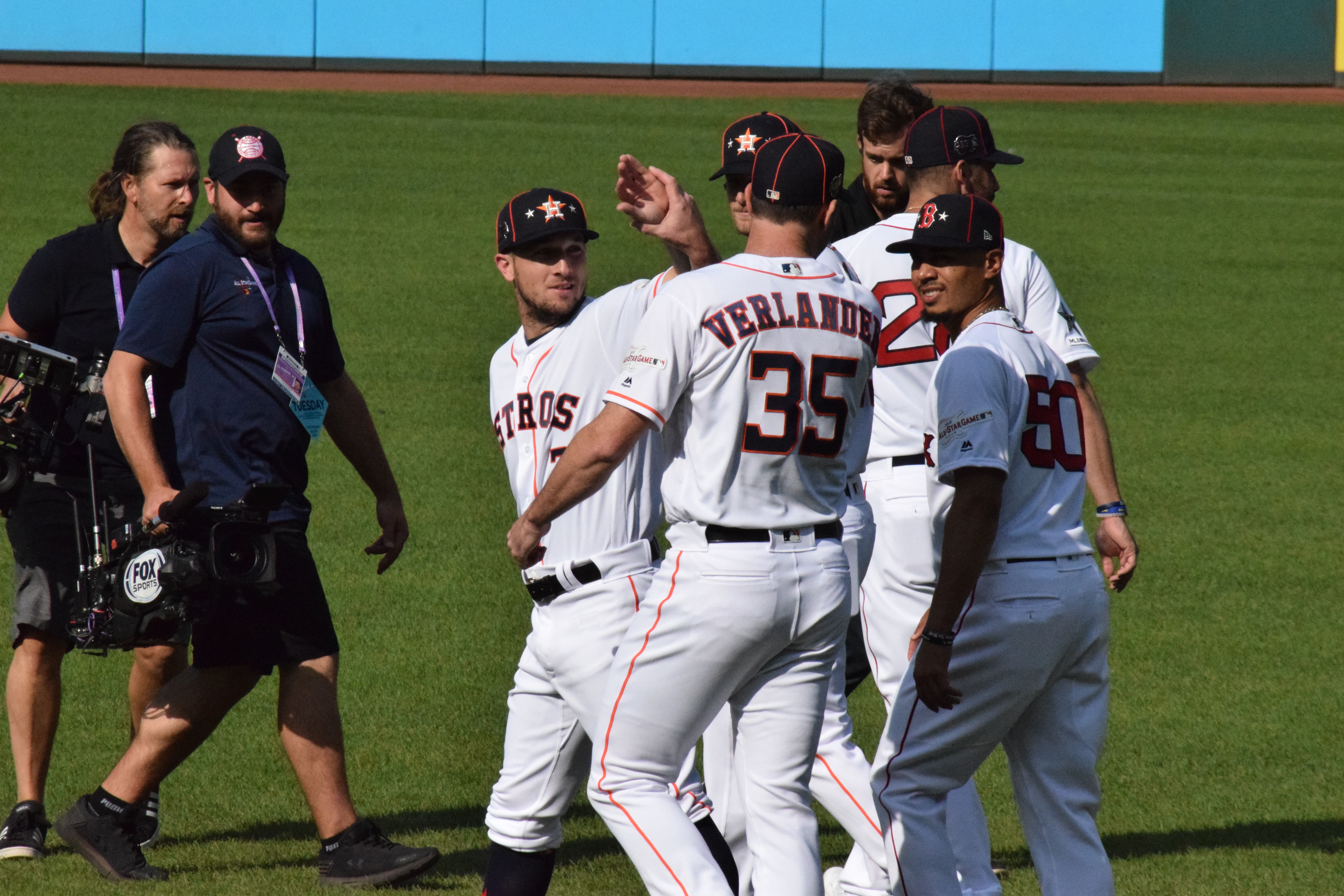
Alex Bregman, Justin Verlander, Mookie Betts (Boston Red Sox), Gerrit Cole, and J. D. Martinez (Red Sox) at the MLB All-Star Game.

On June 9, Yordan Alvarez made his major league debut versus the Baltimore Orioles. He went 1-for-3 with a two-run home run in his debut. Alvarez' home run ignited a 4–0 shutout victory. In his first plate appearance during the bottom of the second inning, Alvarez flied out versus Dylan Bundy. With Yuli Gurriel aboard in the bottom of the fourth, Alvarez launched a Bundy offering deep to left center field for his first home run and break a scoreless tie. Wade Miley (6–3) tossed six inning to earn the win. With two runners on base and two out during the top ninth, Roberto Osuna entered and induced a ground ball out from Rio Ruiz to himself to earn the save (17). The following game, Alvarez again homered, this time versus Matt Albers of the Milwaukee Brewers. He became the first Astro to homer in both of his first two games.

Alvarez became the fourth player in MLB history to hit four home runs in his first five career games when he homered off Clayton Richard of the Toronto Blue Jays, joining Trevor Story, Yasiel Puig and Mike Jacobs.

During a contest that spanned 14 innings on June 12 and ended in a 6–3 defeat to the Milwaukee Brewers, Justin Verlander whiffed 15 to author the thirteenth such bout in club history, and became the eighth Astros moundsman to do so. This was the first such outing since Gerrit Cole had struck out 16 during a one-hit shutout on May 4 of the previous year. (Note: Cole tied Verlander's team high of 15 strikeouts that season on September 8. Criteria: For single games, playing for HOU, in the regular season, requiring strikeouts ≥ 15, sorted by ascending date.) This established a career-high for the right-hander, who had previously recorded 14 strikeouts four times, most recently on August 3, 2018. Verlander earned the quality start, allowing three runs in seven inning and requiring just 100 pitches. Astros pitching combined for 24 strikeouts that game as six relievers succeeded Verlander. Cionel Pérez (1–1) yielded a tie-breaking home run to Mike Moustakas in the top of the final frame and was charged with the loss.

On June 23, Alvarez hit a two-run home run for the seventh in just his twelfth contest, establishing an Astros franchise record. He also became the first Major Leaguer to register 16 runs batted in during that same span.

Righty Gerrit Cole concluded the month of June with a 3–0 record, 1.89 earned run average (ERA), and 49 whiffs over six starts. He worked 38 innings, allowed 29 hits and 1.026 walks plus hits per inning pitched (WHIP). Hence, he was recognized as American League (AL) Pitcher of the Month. It was the first time he had won since April 2015, in the National League, as a member of the Pittsburgh Pirates. The most recent Astro to win was Verlander in May of the previous campaign.

Meanwhile, Yordan Alvarez concluded his first month in the major leagues with a .317 batting average / .406 on-base percentage (OBP) / .733 slugging percentage (SLG) / 1.139 on-base plus slugging (OPS) over 16 games. Alvarez connected for 7 home runs, 21 runs batted in (RBI), and 44 total bases. Hence, he received AL Rookie of the Month honors for June, succeeding Yuli Gurriel in July 2017 as the most recent Astro to win the award.

==== July, pre-All-Star break ====
On July 2, right-hander José Urquidy made his major league debut starting at Coors Field versus the Rockies. Urquidy worked 3 2/3 innings, struck out four and allowed two runs on six hits.

Yuli Gurriel became the first Astro to score a run and RBI in seven consecutive games, and the fifth to homer in five consecutive games on July 7, including a game-tying grand slam in an 11–10 win versus the Los Angeles Angels. He won the AL Player of the Week Award for the week ending July 8, his second weekly honor. He homered six times in all five of the Astros games, collecting nine hits with an OPS of 1.812.

==== MLB All-Star Game ====
For the third successive campaign, six players represented Houston at the MLB All-Star Game, hosted on July 9 at Progressive Field in Cleveland, the most in baseball. Four Astros were named to the starting lineup, including Alex Bregman, Michael Brantley, Justin Verlander, and George Springer, also the most. Pitchers Gerrit Cole and Ryan Pressly were also selected as reserves. Verlander became the fifth Astros hurler to be named starting pitcher at the Midsummer Classic, succeeding J. R. Richard (1980), Mike Scott (1986), Roger Clemens (2004), and Dallas Keuchel (2015).

During the bottom of the second inning, Brantley doubled home Bregman off Clayton Kershaw for the first tally of the contest. The American League retained the lead until the close of the game, prevailaing 4–3.

==== July, post-All-Star break ====
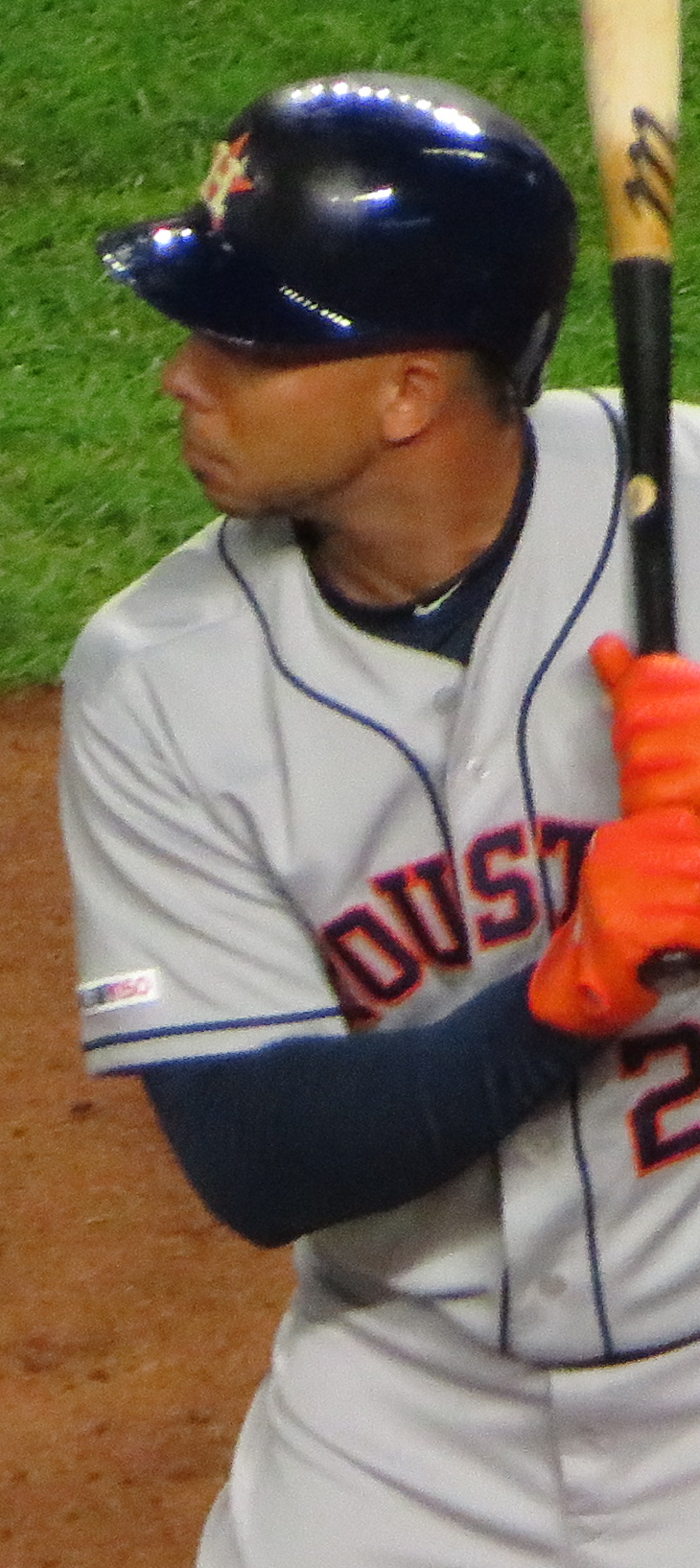
Left fielder Michael Brantley at bat.

On July 17, Michael Brantley slugged his 100th career home run, and 13th of the season, at Angel Stadium during the top of the first inning off Félix Peña.

Starting July 19, Justin Verlander registered 10 or more strikeouts over seven consecutive games started, one fewer than the major league record held by Pedro Martinez (Note: August 19 to September 27, 1999.) and Chris Sale, (Note: Twice, from May 23 to June 30 2015; and April 10 to May 19, 2017.) and most in the major leagues since the final bout of Sale's catenation on May 19, 2017. (Note: Later in the 2019 season, Gerrit Cole surpassed each of Martinez, Sale, and Verlander, authoring a ninth consecutive outing with double figures in whiffs on September 29. Criteria: Longest streak of consecutive games, in the regular season, requiring strikeouts ≥ 10, sorted by most games matching criteria) Meanwhile, Houston's batting order belted four solo solo home runs in support. Yuli Gurriel (17) led off the bottom of the second inning with a home run off Mike Minor. One inning later, each of Jose Altuve (13), Alex Bregman (26), and Yordan Alvarez (10) homered off Minor in succession. Verlander (12–4) was the winning pitcher during a 4–3 triumph over the Texas Rangers, whiffing 12, and scattered 8 hits, 1 walk, and 2 runs over 7 innings. Will Harris (14) and Josh James (3) earned holds, and Robert Osuna converted his 21st save. The victory was the 436th of A. J. Hinch's tenure as manager for Houston, passing Larry Dierker for sole possession of second place. This was the seventh occasion that the Astros connected for back-to-back-to-back home runs. (Note: The most recent feat occurred on June 20, 2018, by George Springer, Bregman, and Altuve, versus Tampa Bay.)

During a contest versus the St. Louis Cardinals on July 28, Jose Altuve homered for his 1,500th career hit, one of three hits in a 6–2 win that afternoon, in his 1,190th career game. The only players in the divisional play era to reach the milestone faster were Ichiro Suzuki, Wade Boggs, Kirby Puckett, Nomar Garciaparra, Tony Gwynn and Derek Jeter.

Prior to the trade deadline on July 31, the Astros made three separate trades. From the Arizona Diamondbacks, they acquired right-handed pitcher Zack Greinke for right-handers J. B. Bukauskas and Corbin Martin, outfielder Seth Beer and infielder Joshua Rojas. From the Toronto Blue Jays, the Astros received right-handers Joe Biagini and Aaron Sanchez and minor league OF Cal Stevenson for OF Derek Fisher. Additionally, the Astros sent catcher Max Stassi to the Los Angeles Angels for minor league outfielders Rainier Rivas and Raider Uceta.

MLB named three Astros as winners of three of four AL monthly awards for July, including Gurriel as Player of the Month, Gerrit Cole as Pitcher of the Month, and Alvarez as Rookie of the Month. His second Pitcher of the Month Award, Cole became the fourth Astros hurler to win at least twice during the same season, joining Randy Johnson (1998), Andy Pettitte (2005), and Dallas Keuchel (thrice, 2015). Alvarez became the first Astros player to win Rookie of the Month more than once. Gurriel batted .408 (40-for-98) 40 /.437 on-base percentage (OBP) / .847 slugging percentage (SLG) / 1.284 on-base plus slugging (OPS), 12 home runs, 31 RBI, and 83 total bases. Gurriel became the ninth player in club history to register 30 or more RBI in one month, succeeding Alex Bregman and Evan Gattis in June of the previous campaign. Additionally, Gurriel joined Richard Hidalgo in September 2000 to record each of a .400 batting average, 10 home runs, and 30 RBI in the same month. (Note: Criteria: In the regular season, from 1898 to 2026, playing for HOU, for any choice in months, requiring runs batted in ≥ 30, sorted by greatest runs batted in.) Gurriel also succeeded Bregman in June of the previous year as the most recent Astro to win Player of the Month.

==== Sanchez—Harris—Biagini—Devenski combined no-hitter ====
On August 3, Sanchez and Biagini, both making their Astros debuts, tossed part of a combined no-hitter of the Seattle Mariners, along with Will Harris and Chris Devenski, to lead a 9–0 win. It was the twelfth no-hitter in club history overall, the second combined, and first no-hitter for each pitcher. Sanchez started and worked the first six innings with six strikeouts and two walks allowed, and Harris, Biagini, and Devenski each followed with one inning apiece. The Astros lineup got 15 hits, with Jose Altuve connecting for his 18th home run, and Michael Brantley went 3-for-5 with four RBI and two doubles. Alex Bregman augmented with a triple, and each of Altuve, Bregman, Yordan Alvarez, and Carlos Correa collected two hits. Sanchez yielded three baserunners and earned a game score of 76.

This no-hitter was the first for the Astros since August 21, 2015, by Mike Fiers, a 3–0 triumph over the Los Angeles Dodgers. Houston pitched their first combined no-hitter on June 11, 2003, a six-man effort started by Roy Oswalt at the original Yankee Stadium, which resulted in an 8–0 victory.

Just four weeks later, on September 1, Verlander pitched Houston's next no-hitter.

==== Rest of August ====
On August 4, Justin Verlander struck out 10 batters over 6 innings in a 3–1 win over the Mariners. With this 10-K performance, Verlander surpassed 200 strikeouts in a season for the ninth time in his career. He joined Nolan Ryan, Randy Johnson, Roger Clemens, Tom Seaver, Pedro Martinez, and Bob Gibson as the only pitchers with nine or more seasons of 200+ strikeouts. All but Clemens and Verlander (ineligible at the time due to still being active) were in the Hall of Fame.

In a 14–3 romp over the Colorado Rockies on August 7, Gurriel homered and tied J. R. Towles with eight RBIs for the club record in one game.

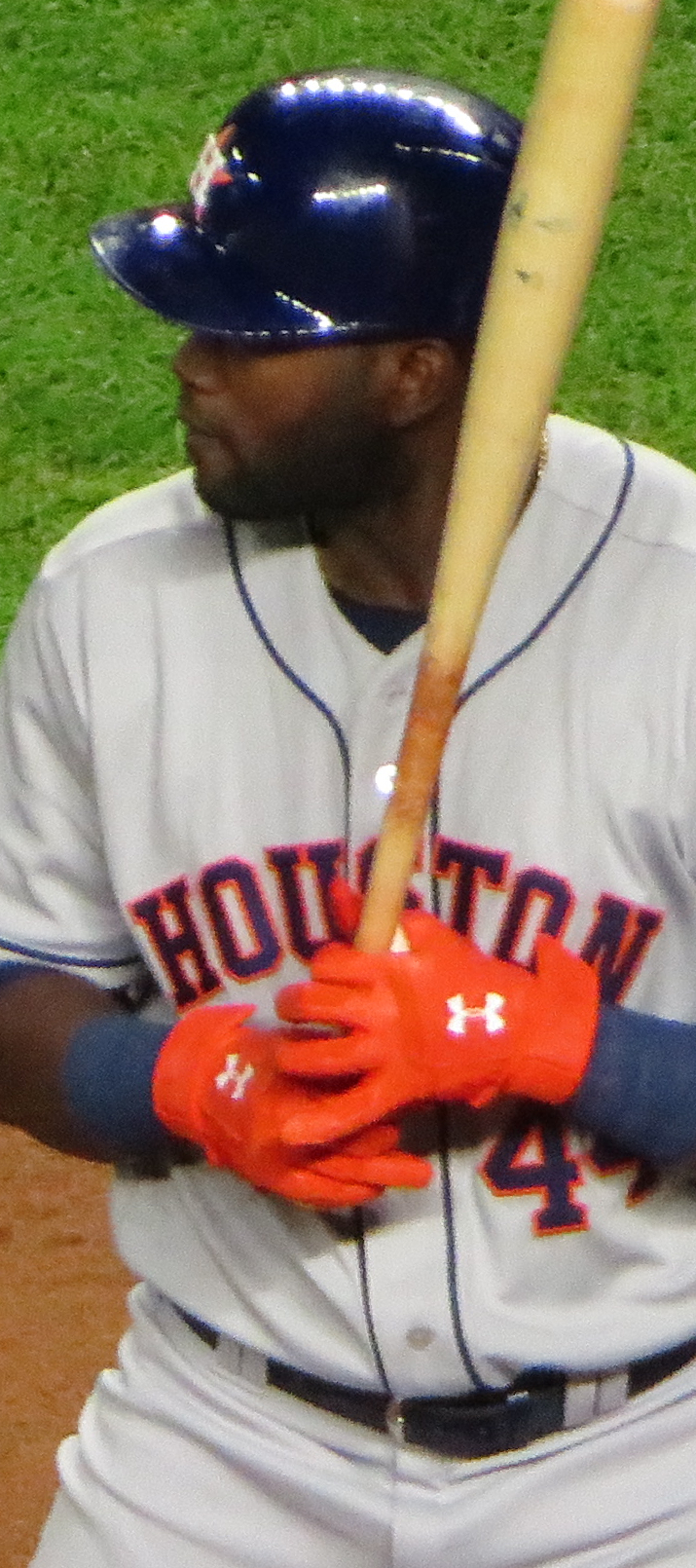
Yordan Alvarez waits for the pitch.

The Astros established a number of franchise records at Camden Yards on August 10, including 23 runs scored, 13 extra-base hits, and a scoring differential of 21 runs, toppling the Baltimore Orioles, 23–2. This was the first contest in franchise history in which the Astros won by at least 20 runs. The Astros connected for seven doubles and six home runs. (Note: Surpassed the run differential of 18 during 19–1 win on July 9, 2017, for the record. The Astros proceeded to win by 20 runs four weeks later on September 8. Criteria: For single games, from 1898 to 2026, for HOU, in the regular season, requiring team run differential ≥ 15, sorted by ascending date.) Three of the home runs came via rookie Yordan Alvarez (17), including his first grand slam, hit off Tayler Scott during the top of the seventh inning. With a career-high seven runs driven in, Alvarez' total stood at 51 to establish the major league record for the first 45 games. Meanwhile, Alex Bregman doubled twice (23) and homered (28), and Jose Altuve (20) and Carlos Correa (16) also went deep. Alvarez became the tenth Astro to hit three home runs in a game, succeeding Carlos Lee on April 13, 2007—who, like Alvarez, hit a grand slam during that bout. (Note: This was the 13th 3-home run game overall for the Astros. Just six weeks later, on September 22, George Springer followed Alvarez as the next Astro to connect for three home runs in a single contest.)

On August 15, Carlos Correa hit his 100th career home run in 7–6 loss to the Athletics at Oakland Coliseum. He joined Cal Ripken Jr. and Alex Rodriguez as the only major league shortstops to hit 100 career home runs before their 25th birthday. He was also the youngest Astro to hit the milestone home run.

On August 18, Zack Greinke obtained his 200th career win, leading a 4–1 final at Oakland, also snapping a five-game losing streak for Houston. Greinke worked seven frames while scattering three walks, struck out six, to augment his record on the season to 13–4. Greinke became the 115th hurler overall and third active to reach the win threshold, joining rotation-mate Verlander (219)—who recorded his as a member of the Astros on August 19, 2018—and CC Sabathia (251). Greinke and Verlander were also two of 32 moundsmen all-time to procure 200 wins and 2,500 strikeouts. Alex Bregman stroked four hits, homered (30) and recorded 3 RBI to lead Houston's offense, his second consecutive 30-home run season. Verlander and Greinke were the second and third hurlers to record his 200th win in an Astros uniform, following Nolan Ryan on July 27, 1982.

Sanchez was removed from his fourth start for the Astros on August 20 after 2 2/3 innings due to pectoral muscle tightness, and later underwent surgery, prematurely ending his season.

On August 21, the Detroit Tigers defeated the Astros, 2–1. Justin Verlander struck out 11 over nine innings, surrendered no walks and two hits—both of them solo home runs. He became the first pitcher to lose a nine-inning complete game without throwing a single pitch with a runner on base. (Note: Two other such games preceded Verlander's that lasted fewer than nine innings: July 30, 1971, Dick Drago (four innings) and on May 31, 2007, Mark Buehrle (eight). For single games, pitcher lost, in complete games, in the regular season, requiring baserunners allowed = 1.0 × home runs allowed, sorted by descending date.) This was also Verlander's seventh consecutive outing in which he accrued double-digit strikeouts, just the fifth hurler in major league history to do so. Verlander's batterymate, Robinson Chirinos batted with two outs in the bottom of the ninth, had homered earlier and was a triple away from hitting for the cycle. He doubled to deep right-center field but was thrown out attempting to claim third base to end the contest.

On August 22, Abraham Toro made his major league debut, going 0-for-4 versus Detroit. The Astros won, 6 to 3, led by Gerrit Cole (15–5) blanking the Tigers on two hits over seven inning with 12 strikeouts, earning the victory and a game score of 84. Michael Brantley doubled and collected three hits and two RVI, and Alex Bregman homered (31) and had two hits and two RBI.

Alex Bregman hit .404, with 14 doubles, 6 home runs, 31 RBI, and 1.235 OPS during the month of August. Bregman joined Hidalgo in September 2000 as the second Astro to hit .400, 14 doubles, and 30 RBI in the same month. Additionally this was Bregman's second month with at least 30 RBI (June 2018), joining Jeff Bagwell (6 times) as the second Astro with multiple 30-RBI months.

==== Justin Verlander's no-hitter ====
In the September 1 contest versus the Blue Jays at Rogers Centre, Verlander pitched his third career no-hitter, the second of the season for the Astros, and 13th in team history. He allowed one baserunner, a walk to Cavan Biggio (son of Astros Hall of Famer Craig Biggio) in the first inning, and struck out 14 batters. The Astros' only runs came on a two-run home run by Abraham Toro in the top of the ninth inning. This was also Verlander's second career no-hitter against the Blue Jays at the Rogers Centre, making him just the third pitcher of the modern era to no-hit the same team twice, and the first to pitch both no-hitters against the same team on the road. (Note: Verlander tossed his first no-hitter at the Rogers Centre on May 7, 2011, as a member of the Detroit Tigers.) He is the sixth pitcher to throw three or more no-hitters in his career. Verlander fanned each of Bichette, Biggio, Justin Smoak, Rowdy Tellez, and Randal Grichuk more than once. Vladimir Guerrero Jr. was the only Blue Jay who resisted strikeout.

The Blue Jays pitching were dominant as well, with opener Wilmer Font, Sam Gaviglio, and Zack Godley all combining to hurl scoreless ball against the Houston's lineup stacked with sluggers through the first eight frames. Former Astros closer Ken Giles assumed the top of the ninth. Alex Bregman led off with a popup that turned into a double when Biggio was unable to dive and secure the batted ball beyond first base. Rookie Yordan Alvarez struck out, and Aledmys Díaz, playing first base, lined out to center field, allowing Bregman to advance to third. The Canadian-born Toro then cranked a 1-and-1 offering from Giles deep to the left-center field bleachers to provide the Astros with a 2–0 advantage.

During the bottom of the ninth, Verlander induced the final out when Bo Bichette hit a ground ball to Toro, manning third base that contest. Toro scooped, then rifled the ball to Díaz at first base to seal the no-hit outing.

With the no-hitter, Verlander hurled the 16th contest in Major League history that featured a game score of 100 or higher in nine innings and under (each game fitting these criteria have been either no-hit or one-hit shutout victories), and second in franchise history. Verlander's no-hitter succeeded rotation-mate Gerrit Cole's one-hit, 16-strikeout performance on May 4, 2018. (Note: For single games, only 9-inning games or shortened, in the regular season, requiring game score ≥ 100, sorted by ascending date.)

Having reprised the combined no-hit bout of Sanchez—Harris—Biagini—Devenski on August 3, Verlander's magnum opus thrusted the 2019 Astros as the 15th MLB squad to assemble two no-hitters within the same campaign—also tying the MLB record. The first in franchise history, the 2019 Astros were the 10th club in AL history to turn out two no-hit bouts. In 2022, the Astros replicated this feat, establishing the MLB record for shortest gap between such seasons. Overall, the Boston Red Sox franchise has the most campaigns of this type of achievement, with 3 (1904, 1916, and 1962).

==== Rest of September ====
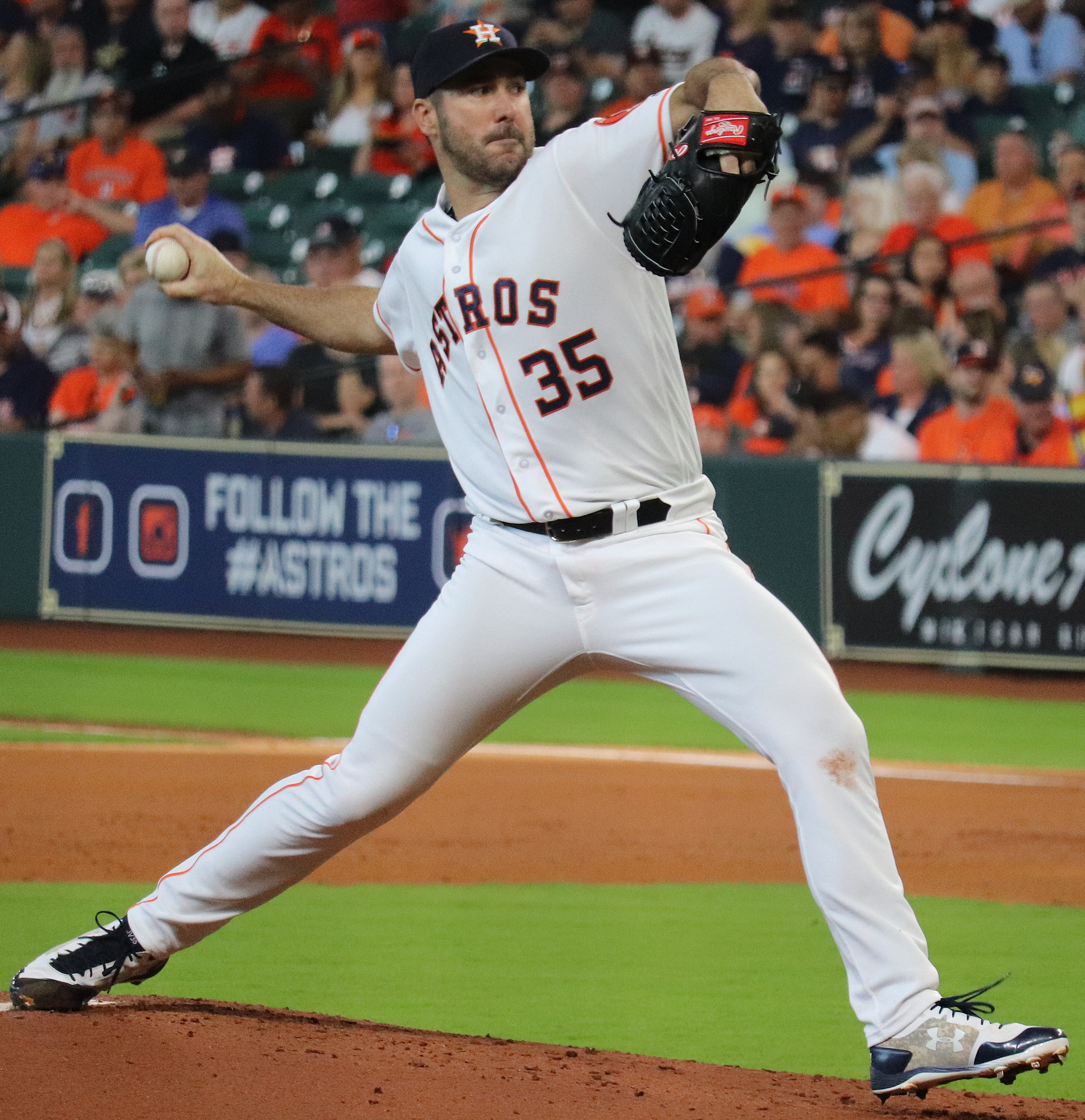
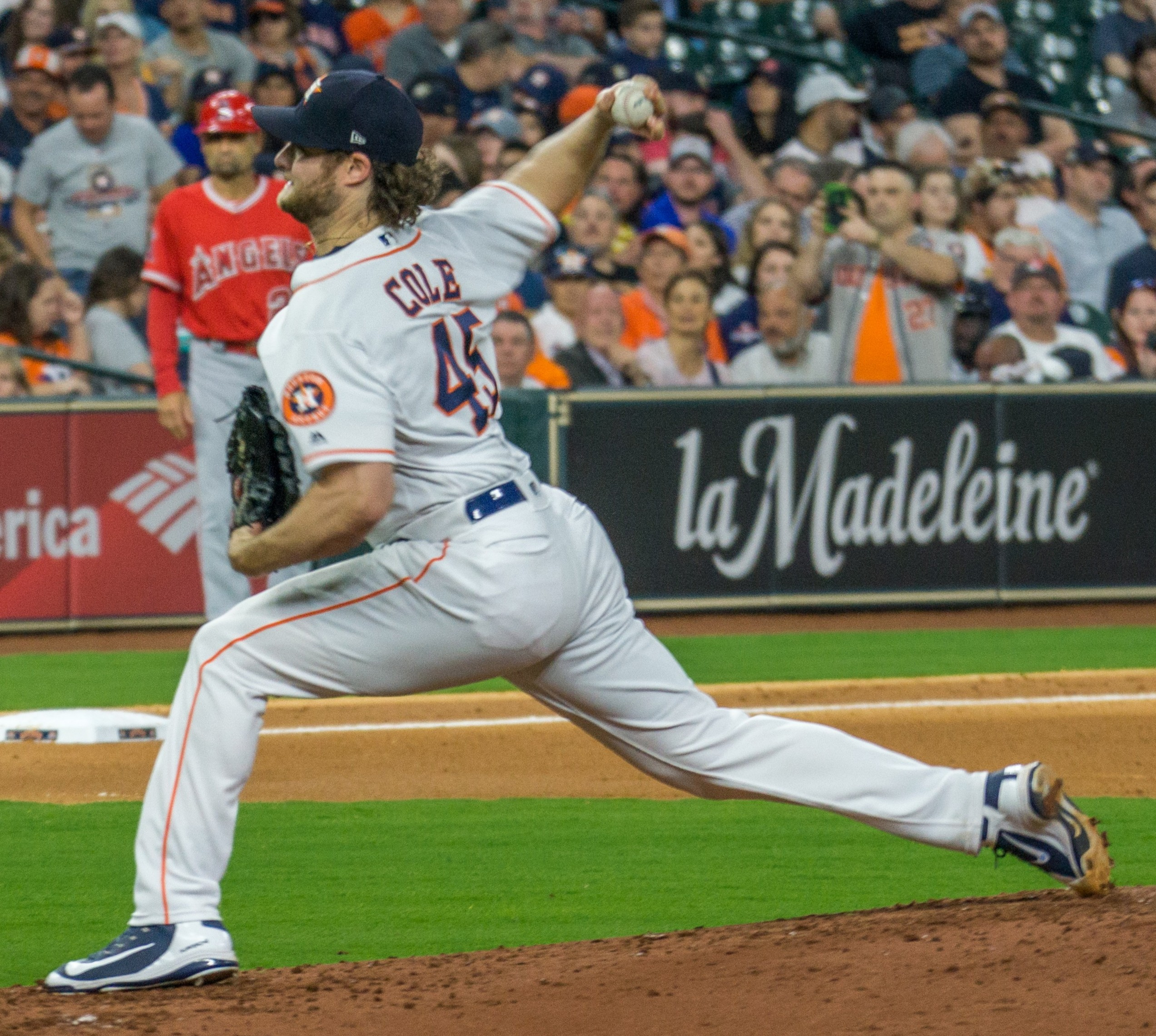
Co-aces Justin Verlander (left) and Gerrit Cole (right).

On September 5, right fielder Kyle Tucker connected for his first major league home during the bottom of the sixth inning off Marco Gonzales, with Seattle leading, 7–3, one of multiple timely hits. Two batters later, Josh Reddick took Gonzales deep. During the bottom of the eighth inning, Jose Altuve tripled home Robinson Chirinos and Reddick to rally the Astros back to an 8-to-7 deficit, and Michael Brantley lined a sacrifice fly to left field to plate Altuve and tie the score. The game proceeded to extra innings, and in the twelfth, Kyle Seager took Josh James deep to left field and Seattle regained the lead, 9–8. Tucker singled home Myles Straw during the bottom of the twelfth to tie the score again, and, in the bottom of the 13th, Brantley drilled a walk-off home run to deep right center to secure an 11–9 triumph, Brantley's third career walk-off homer, and first as an Astro.

On September 7, Verlander continued his dominance, reaching 32 consecutive batters retired, a streak that established an Astros franchise record and was tied by teammate Ryan Pressly in 2022.

On September 8, Gerrit Cole struck out 15 batters over eight innings in a 21–1 victory over the Seattle Mariners. He became just the second pitcher to strike out 14 or more hitters in three consecutive games, joining Pedro Martínez in 1999. It was the sixth outing of the season of at least 10 strikeouts and no walks for Cole, tying the major league record. The 15 strikeouts tied Verlander's Minute Maid Park record, set earlier in the season on June 12 versus the Brewers. It was Cole's 12 consecutive decision won, dating back to May 27, with the Astros going 16–2 in those 18 starts.

The Astros established a major league record on September 9 by hitting six home runs within the first two innings of a 15–0 rout of the A's. Robinson Chirinos and Yordan Alvarez each homered twice, and Alex Bregman, Jose Altuve, and Michael Brantley all added home runs to give the Astros a club record-tying seven in the game. (Note: The Astros previously hit seven home runs in a single game once, on September 9, 2000, versus the Chicago Cubs) Alvarez (24) passed Correa for the club rookie record for home runs, while increasing his RBI total to 72, which tied for second-highest total through the first 71 games of a career in major league history. (Note: Alvarez' 72 RBI tied Ted Williams (1939) and Rudy York (1937), and trailed Walt Dropo's 80 (1949–50).) Former Astro Mike Fiers (14–4), starting for Oakland, allowed career-highs of both nine runs and five home runs on nine hits in one-plus innings. Combined with the 21-run output the day before versus Seattle, the Astros established a club record with 36 runs scored over two games, including 32 runs over a nine-inning span. The 32 runs were second in major league history within a nine-inning span only to the 2007 Texas Rangers, which included a record 30–3 win over Baltimore, per the Elias Sports Bureau.

The following day, on September 10, the Athletics routed Houston, 21–7, tying their franchise with 25 hits, last achieved in 1969. Astros starter Wade Miley (13–5) had got just one out when pulled in the first after the A's led 6–0, following his last start in Seattle where he had allowed five runs without recording any outs. Still, it was his first loss since June 17. The Astros became the first MLB team since the Cleveland Spiders in 1893 to play three consecutive contests decided by 14 or more runs each. George Springer hit a leadoff home run for Houston, and connected again in the third inning, with both drives of Tanner Roark. The second drive was Houston's 250th of the season, to set a club record, surpassing the 2000 squad. Martín Maldonado also connected during the fifth and ninth innings, raising the team total to 252 by the end of the contest.

On September 18 versus Texas, Cole struck out his 300th batter of the season, Shin-Soo Choo, in a 3–2 win. Cole became the 18th major leaguer and third Astros pitcher to reach the milestone, following J. R. Richard (303 in 1978 and 313 in 1979) and Mike Scott (306 in 1986). Cole also became the second-fastest pitcher to register 300 strikeouts in terms of innings pitched; his 198 1/3 innings trailed only Randy Johnson's 197 2/3 IP in 2001. The win, the Astros' 100th of the season, clinched at least a share of a Wild Card berth, and made them the sixth team in history to win at least 100 games in three consecutive seasons. The Astros clinched the AL West division title at Minute Maid Park on September 22, their 102nd win of the year, third straight division title, and first three-peat since the 1997–1999 seasons. Justin Verlander and George Springer led a 13–5 defeat of the Los Angeles Angels. Verlander won his 20th game of the season, Springer connected for three home runs, Yordan Alvarez collected four hits, and Aledmys Díaz added a three-run home run.

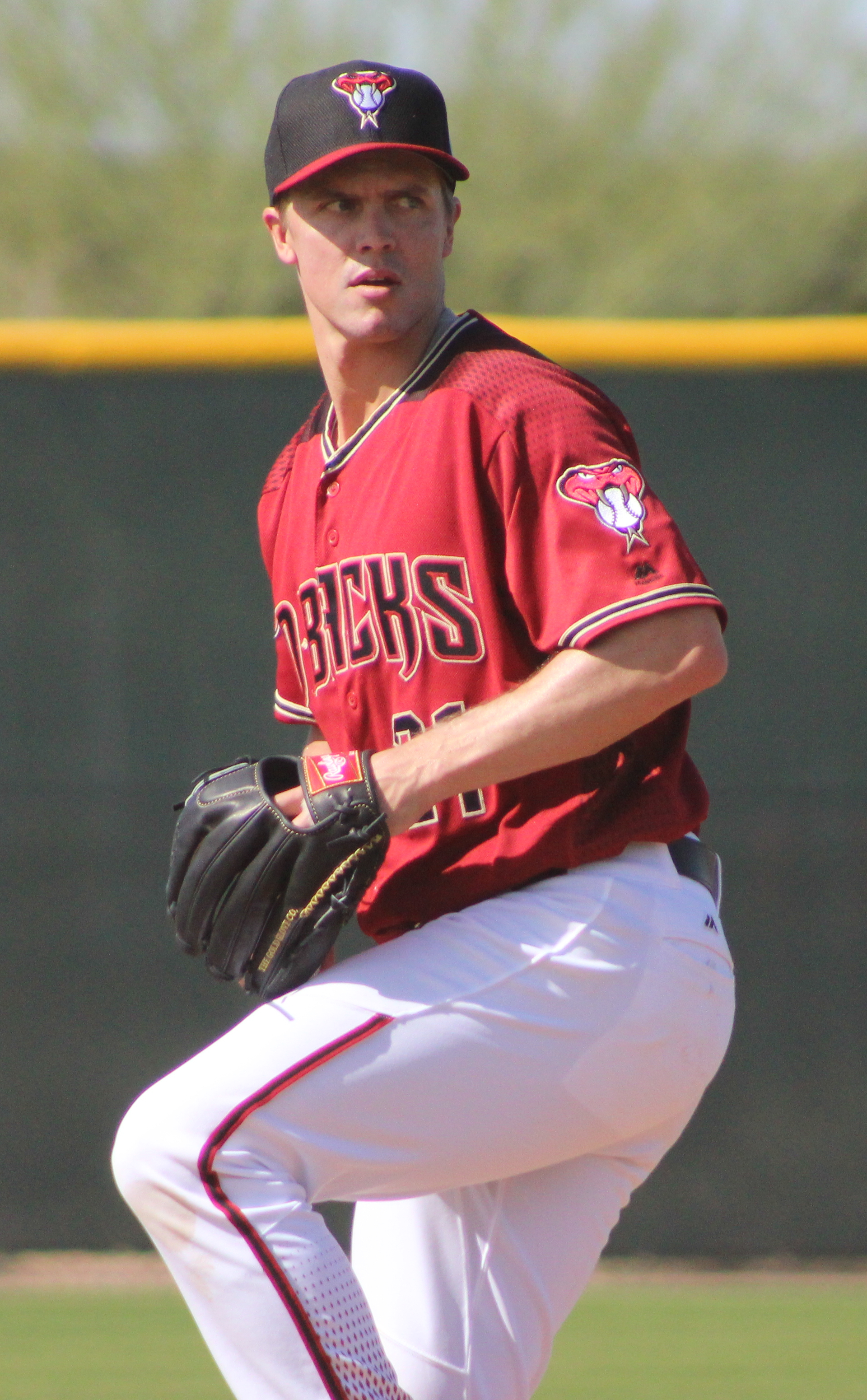
Starter Zack Greinke was acquired from Arizona in 2019.

On September 22, George Springer homered thrice, becoming the 14th Astro to do so in a single game, while succeeding Yordan Alvarez on August 10, 2019. (Note: Alvarez replicated this feat against on September 16, 2022, generating the next three-home run event by an Astro.) Alvarez added four hits with two doubles, Alex Bregman (39) and Aledmys Díaz (8) also homered, and Justin Verlander tossed five innings to obtain his 20th win. Houston cruised to a 13–5 triumph over the Angels.

==== Record-setting win ====
On September 25, Zack Greinke (18–5) started and won the 104th win of the season for Houston, securing the franchise record for a single season (103) from the prior season. Moreover, Greinke came within two outs of his first career no-hitter and a Major League record third for one team in the same season, During the top of the first inning, the Astros seized a 2–0 lead on RBI doubles by Alex Bregman and Yordan Alvarez off Mariners starter Yusei Kikuchi (6–11). Only a base on balls issued by Greinke to Dee Strange-Gordon with one out during the bottom of the sixth inning interrupted a perfect game bid to that point. However, Greinke induced Tim Lopes to line out to himself to ignite a double play, maintaining Seattle at the minimum batters faced. In the eighth inning, Greinke snared another line drive rocketed toward him off the bat of Omar Narváez. In the top of the ninth, Astros rookie Kyle Tucker added an insurance run with a solo home run. With one out during the bottom of the ninth, Austin Nola lined a single to left-center just out of the reach of a diving Jake Marisnick to break up Greinke's no-hit hid. Lopes followed with a consecutive single. Will Harris relieved Greinke and got the final two for his third save. Tucker catalyzed a club-record 21st bout in catenation with a home run. This was a second no-hit bid by Greinke this season, following a bout with Arizona during which Trea Turner of the Washington Nationals hit an infield single in the seventh inning.

==== Will Harris' immaculate inning ====
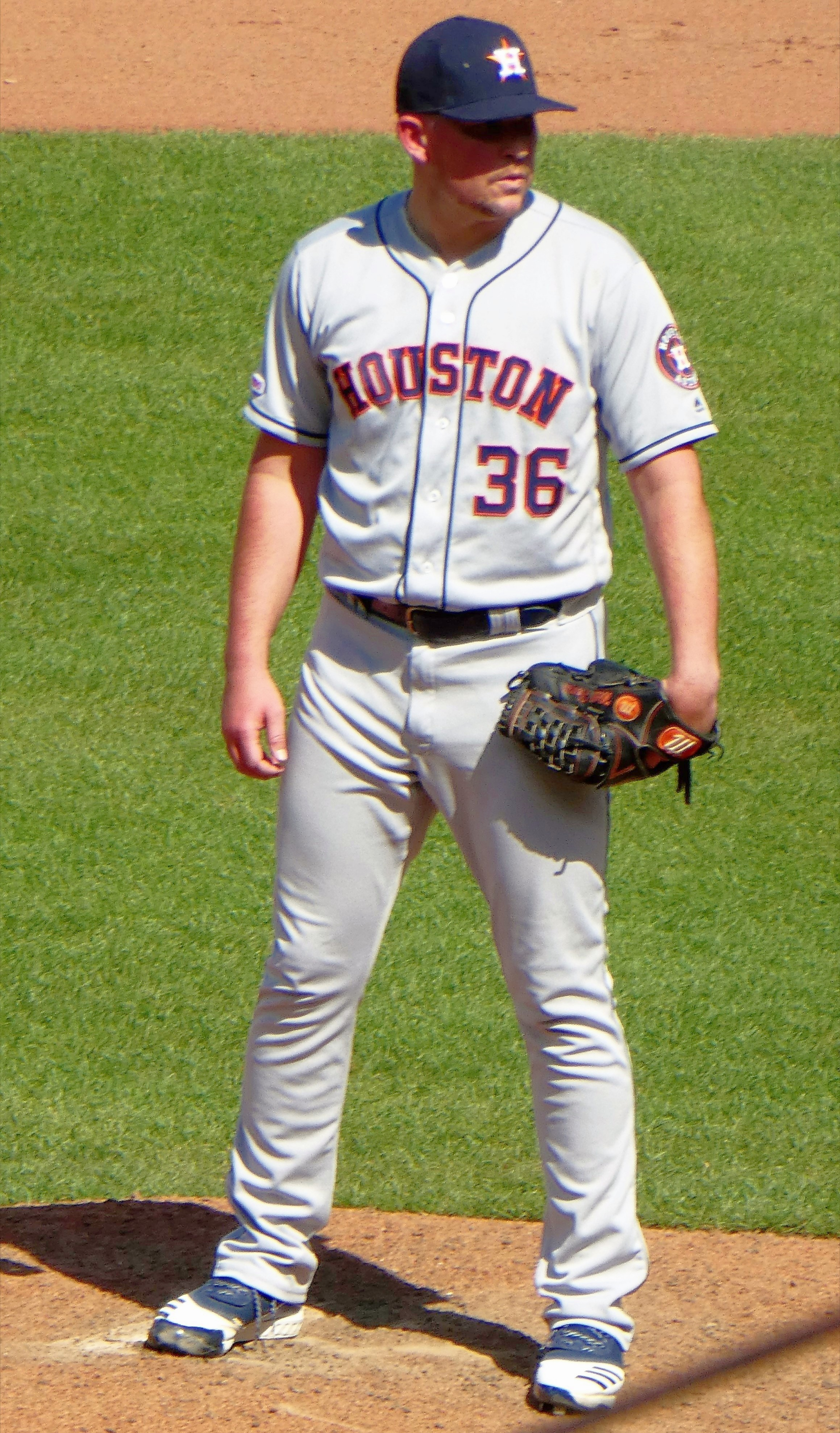
Right-hander Will Harris on the pitcher's mound.

Will Harris tossed an immaculate eighth inning versus the Angels on September 27. Harris fanned Kaleb Cowart, Matt Thaiss, and Michael Hermosillo. José Urquidy started and earned his second Major League victory, and Ryan Pressly earned his 30th hold. Alex Bregman (41) connected for a home run and three RBI (111) in the top of the eighth inning to extend Houston's lead to 4–0. The seventh immaculate inning in franchise history, it was the first by a Houston moundsman since their realignment into the American League. Harris succeeded Brandon Backe on April 15, 2004. Harris' achievement preceding the next Astros pitcher was also the first-ever event of two immaculate innings during the same game in the Major Leagues, on June 15, 2022, by Luis García and Phil Maton.

==== Justin Verlander's 3,000th strikeout ====
On September 28, Verlander became the first major leaguer to achieve his 3000th career strikeout during the same game in which he collected the 300th of the individual season during which he pitched. During the bottom of the second and fifth innings, Verlander struck out the side. His sixth strikeout, of Kole Calhoun during the bottom of the fourth, registered the milestone 3,000th. During the bottom of the sixth, Verlander got Calhoun again on a swinging strikeout for the 300th of season and his final of the game. Jose Altuve (31) went deep off José Suarez, and Josh Reddick (14) also hit a three-run home run to provide the offense. Verlander struck out 12 over 6 innings to obtain his 21th victory of the season, with a game score of 74, leading a 6-to-3 Astros win. Héctor Rondón (19) and Ryan Pressly each recorded holds, and Roberto Osuna converted his 38th save.

Verlander and Cole became the second teammate duo since Randy Johnson and Curt Schilling with the 2002 Arizona Diamondbacks to reach 300 strikeouts. This victory clinched home-field advantage for Houston throughout the MLB postseason.

==== End of September ====
On September 29, Gerrit Cole fanned 10 Los Angeles Angels batters, indicating a major league-record ninth consecutive such outing. He struck out Kaleb Cowart swinging in the top of the fifth inning for his 10th strikeout in an 8–5 win, while winning his 16th consecutive decision. It was also Cole's 21st double-digit strikeout performance, becoming the fourth hurler to accrue as many in one season, joining Sandy Koufax, Nolan Ryan, and Randy Johnson. Cole collected 326 strikeouts, the most by a right-hander in the major leagues since Ryan (341) in 1977.

Gerrit Cole concluded the season on a personal 16-game winning streak. During the month of September, Cole struck out 74 batters, which was the most in the major leagues since Chris Sale whiffed 75 in June 2015. In addition to three AL Pitcher of the Month Awards, Cole received the Hickok Belt for September, featuring a monthly category awarded for the top performance by a professional athlete. Cole succeeded golfer Rory McIlroy, the winner for August, while ensuing George Springer in November 2017 as the most recent Astro to be named.

==== Performance overview ====
Having roared to club-record 107 victories while winning the third of three division titles for the second time in franchise history (1997—1999 National League Central division titles), manager A. J. Hinch likewise joined Larry Dierker as the second Houston manager to guide the Astros to such a feat. Hinch also became the first Astros manager to guide his club to three consecutive 100-win seasons, while having broken the club record for wins for a second consecutive year (103 in 2018 and 107 in 2019).

The Astros' slugging percentage of .495 set the major league record. They led the major leagues in bases on balls (645 BB), batting average (.274) and on-base percentage (.352 OBP), while surrendering the second-fewest runs (640), and ranked second in fielding percentage (.988). Houston pitching fanned the most hitters (1,671), while their lineup were retired via the fewest strikeouts (1,166). They also hit 288 home runs to set a club record, surpassing the 249 bombs by the 2000 squad. The Astros were recognized by Wilson Sporting Goods as their Defensive Team of the Year.

Six Astros gained selection to the inaugural edition of the All-MLB Team, the most in baseball. Gerrit Cole and Justin Verlander headlined the group as First Team starting pitchers. Jose Altuve (second baseman), Alex Bregman (third baseman), Yordan Alvarez (designated hitter), and Zack Greinke (starting pitcher) each made the All-MLB Second Team. Meanwhile, Bregman and George Springer were named to The Sporting News' end-of-season AL All-Star team.

Verlander and Cole, anchoring the starting rotation, became just the second pair of teammates to attain 300 or more strikeouts during the same season, (Note: Number of players that meet criteria in a season for a team, in the regular season, requiring strikeouts ≥ 300, sorted by descending instances.) while becoming the first to turn each of 300 strikeouts, sub-3.00 earned run average (ERA) and 20 or more wins. The 300-strikeout and 20-win thresholds were first achieved by Randy Johnson (24–5 W–L, 2.32 ERA, 334 K) and Curt Schilling (23–7 W–L, 3.23 ERA, 316 K) as members of the 2002 Arizona Diamondbacks. Further, Verlander and Cole virtually replicated each other's production, combining to lead the AL in the pitching Triple Crown categories, (Note: Composed of leading the league in each of wins, strikeouts and ERA.) and led or placed in the top five in virtually every other measure. Verlander—who led MLB in wins (21), and finished second to Cole in MLB in strikeouts (326 to 300) and in the AL in ERA (2.50 to 2.58)—clinched his second American League Cy Young Award. Cole's second-place finish signaled one of the closest Cy Young votes in history. Moreover, it was the just fifth season in which teammates placed both first and second in the Cy Young balloting, succeeding Don Newcombe and Sal Maglie, 1956 Dodgers; Mike Marshall and Andy Messersmith, 1974 Dodgers; and Johnson and Schilling, twice, 2001 and 2002 Diamondbacks.

Verlander and Cole joined Mike Hampton and José Lima (22 games won and 21, respectively, in 1999) as the second 20-game winner duo for the Astros.

Verlander became the fifth Astros pitcher to lead the league in wins (21), following Joe Niekro in 1979 (21), Mike Scott in 1989 (20), Mike Hampton in 1999 (22), and Roy Oswalt in 2004 (20). In addition to the Cy Young Award, Verlander was recognized as the Baseball America Major League Player of the Year, and the Players Choice Award for AL Outstanding Pitcher. Verlander became the fourth Astros pitcher to win the Cy Young Award, and second since realigning to the American League. Previous Astros winners included Mike Scott (1986 in the National League (NL)), Roger Clemens (2004 NL), and Dallas Keuchel (2015 AL). Verlander's second Cy Young, he had previously won as a member of the Detroit Tigers in 2011, also the year in which he won the pitching Triple Crown.

In addition to setting the franchise record for the strikeouts (326), Cole led the AL, the seventh time an Astros hurler headlined the league, and fifth pitcher overall. Preceding him in this achievement included J. R. Richard (twice) in 1978 (303) and in 1979 (313), Mike Scott in 1986 (306), Nolan Ryan (twuce) in 1987 (270) and in 1988 (228), and Verlander in 2018 (290). Cole became the fifth Astro to lead all of baseball, following Richard (1987 and !979), Scott (1986), Ryan (1987) and Randy Johnson (1998). (Note: Johnson, a midseason acquisition from the Seattle Mariners to the Astros which relocated him from the AL to the National League (NL), did not accumulate enough strikeouts to lead either individual league that year.) Cole authored 21 double-digit strikeout games, becoming the fourth pitcher to do so in one season, joining Sandy Koufax, Ryan, and Johnson; further, Cole's 326 strikeouts were the most by a right-hander in the major leagues since Ryan fanned 341 in 1977.

Moreover, Cole finished as the AL ERA leader at 2.50, the eighth time by a Houston pitcher, and seventh individual Houston pitcher overall. Preceding Cole were J. R. Richard in 1979 (2.71), Nolan Ryan (twice) in 1981 (1.69) and 1987 (2.76), Mike Scott in 1986 (2.22), Danny Darwin in 1990 (2.21), Roger Clemens in 2005 (1.87), and Roy Oswalt in 2006 (2.98).

As the AL leader in strikeouts and ERA, Cole assembled the fourth season in which an Astros pitcher claimed two-thirds of the pitching Triple Crown (Richard in 1979, Scott in 1986, and Ryan in 1987). Along with Verlander as the AL wins leader, it was the second time in franchise history that Astros pitching claimed each of the three individual Triple Crown categories, following the 1979 team: J. Richard with 313 strikeouts and 2.71 ERA, and Joe Niekro with 21 wins.

Cole was recognized with The Sporting News AL Pitcher of the Year Award, the fourth Astro to receive this honor, following Joe Niekro in 1979, Mike Scott in 1986, and Mike Hampton in 1999. (Note: From its inception in 1944 until 2012, The Sporting News recognized one pitcher each from the AL and the National League (NL) for this award. Beginning in 2013, the award was redesignated to recognize one starting pitcher and relief pitcher from each league.)

Additionally, starter Zack Greinke won each of the Silver Slugger, Gold Glove, Fielding Bible, and the Wilson Defensive Player of the Year Awards. He became the second pitcher to win both the Silver Slugger and Gold Glove Awards during the same season, succeeding Mike Hampton in 2003. Greinke tied for second-most double plays tunned by a pitcher in one season all-time (12, including 8 with Arizona, and 4 with Houston), trailing only Bob Lemon (15 in 1953), while tying with Eddie Rommel (1920), Curt Davis (1934), and Randy Jones (1976). Greinke joined Bobby Shantz (1962, also during a partial season with Houston) and Dallas Keuchel (four, 2014 to 2016, 2018) as pitchers who have won the Gold Glove as a member of the Colt .45s/Astros. Also winner of a second Silver Slugger, Greinke was joined by George Springer as a two-time winner, while Alex Bregman won the first of his career.

Right-hander Will Harris established an all-time club record in earned run average (ERA) for relief pitchers at 1.50 (minimum 50 innings), to surpass Don McMahon's 1.53 effort which had stood since the expansion Colt .45s inaugural 1962 campaign. In 2022, Ryne Stanek broke Harris' record with a 1.15 ERA.

Yordan Alvarez' .655 slugging percentage (SLG) and 1.067 on-base plus slugging percentage (OPS) were both the highest in history for a qualified rookie, (Note: Minimum 350 plate appearances.) exceeding Shoeless Joe Jackson's .590 SLG and 1.058 OPS during the 1911 campaign. Hence, Alvarez was recognized as AL Rookie of the Year Award, the third Astro to receive the award, preceded by Jeff Bagwell (1991) and Carlos Correa (2015). Alvarez also became the tenth Astro to win The Sporting News Rookie of the Year (Note: From 1961–2003, The Sporting News selected one rookie position player and one rookie pitcher from each league of the American League (AL) and National Leagues (NL), for this award. Starting in 2004, this system was modified to selecting one rookie from each league for the award, regardless of position.) and was also recognized with the Players Choice Award for AL Outstanding Rookie.

Bregman was runner-up for the AL Most Valuable Player Award (MVP).

=== Game log ===
2019 Game Log: 107–55 (Home: 60–21; Away: 47–34)
March/April: 18–12 (Home: 10–3; Away: 8–9)

#	Date	Opponent	Score	Win	Loss	Save	Attendance	Record	Streak
1	March 28	@ Rays	5–1	**Verlander** (1–0)	Snell (0–1)	—	25,025	1–0	W1
2	March 29	@ Rays	2–4	Morton (1–0)	**Cole** (0–1)	Alvarado (1)	13,059	1–1	L1
3	March 30	@ Rays	1–3	Glasnow (1–0)	**McHugh** (0–1)	Alvarado (2)	16,010	1–2	L2
4	March 31	@ Rays	1–3	Chirinos (1–0)	**Miley** (0–1)	Castillo (1)	18,473	1–3	L3
5	April 1	@ Rangers	2–1	**Peacock** (1–0)	Sampson (0–1)	**Osuna** (1)	18,056	2–3	W1
6	April 2	@ Rangers	4–6	Kelley (2–0)	**Valdez** (0–1)	Leclerc (2)	17,907	2–4	L1
7	April 3	@ Rangers	0–4	Minor (1–1)	**Cole** (0–2)	–	22,265	2–5	L2
8	April 5	A's	3–2	**McHugh** (1–1)	Montas (1–1)	**Osuna** (2)	43,165	3–5	W1
9	April 6	A's	6–0	**Miley** (1–1)	Brooks (1–1)	—	34,487	4–5	W2
10	April 7	A's	9–8	**Osuna** (1–0)	Treinen (0–1)	—	34,902	5–5	W3
11	April 8	Yankees	4–3	**Pressly** (1–0)	Ottavino (1–1)	**Osuna** (3)	27,631	6–5	W4
12	April 9	Yankees	6–3	**Rondón** (1–0)	Green (0–2)	**Osuna** (4)	31,009	7–5	W5
13	April 10	Yankees	8–6	**McHugh** (2–1)	Paxton (1–2)	**Pressly** (1)	27,685	8–5	W6
14	April 12	@ Mariners	10–6	**Peacock** (2–0)	Armstrong (0–1)	**Osuna** (5)	30,969	9–5	W7
15	April 13	@ Mariners	3–1	**Verlander** (2–0)	Hernández (1–1)	**Osuna** (6)	30,533	10–5	W8
16	April 14	@ Mariners	3–2	**Cole** (1–2)	Brennan (0–1)	**Osuna** (7)	29,237	11–5	W9
17	April 16	@ Athletics	9–1	**McHugh** (3–1)	Estrada (0–2)	—	12,270	12–5	W10
18	April 17	@ Athletics	1–2	Montas (3–1)	**Miley** (1–2)	Treinen (6)	11,323	12–6	L1
19	April 19	@ Rangers	7–2	**Verlander** (3–0)	Smyly (0–2)	—	35,649	13–6	W1
20	April 20	@ Rangers	4–9	Kelley (3–0)	**Cole** (1–3)	—	39,636	13–7	L1
21	April 21	@ Rangers	10–11	Miller (1–1)	**McHugh** (3–2)	Kelley (1)	26,225	13–8	L2
22	April 22	Twins	5–9	Odorizzi (2–2)	**Peacock** (2–1)	—	34,518	13–9	L3
23	April 23	Twins	10–4	**Rondón** (2–0)	Hildenberger (2–1)	—	29,409	14–9	W1
24	April 24	Twins	7–1	**Verlander** (4–0)	Stewart (0–1)	—	26,582	15–9	W2
25	April 25	Indians	1–2	Bauer (3–1)	**Cole** (1–4)	Hand (7)	24,948	15–10	L1
26	April 26	Indians	3–6	Cimber (2–1)	**Rondón** (2–1)	Hand (8)	38,084	15–11	L2
27	April 27	Indians	4–3 (10)	**Osuna** (2–0)	Cimber (2–2)	—	38,667	16–11	W1
28	April 28	Indians	4–1	**Valdez** (1–1)	Carrasco (2–3)	**Pressly** (2)	31,025	17–11	W2
29	April 29	@ Twins	0–1	Odorizzi (3–2)	**Verlander** (4–1)	Parker (6)	12,615	17–12	L1
30	April 30	@ Twins	11–0	**Cole** (2–4)	Pineda (2–2)	—	12,181	18–12	W1

May: 20–8 (Home: 12–5; Away: 8–3)

#	Date	Opponent	Score	Win	Loss	Save	Attendance	Record	Streak
31	May 1	@ Twins	2–6	Pérez (4–0)	**McHugh** (3–3)	—	14,115	18–13	L1
32	May 2	@ Twins	2–8	Berríos (5–1)	**Peacock** (2–2)	—	17,721	18–14	L2
33	May 4	@ Angels	14–2	**Miley** (2–2)	Cahill (1–3)	—	18,177	19–14	W1
34	May 5	@ Angels	10–4	**Verlander** (5–1)	Harvey (1–3)	—	17,614	20–14	W2
35	May 6	Royals	6–4	**Cole** (3–4)	Junis (3–3)	**Osuna** (8)	27,079	21–14	W3
36	May 7	Royals	2–12	Duffy (1–1)	**McHugh** (3–4)	—	30,377	21–15	L1
37	May 8	Royals	9–0	**Peacock** (3–2)	López (0–4)	—	22,698	22–15	W1
38	May 9	Rangers	4–2	**Miley** (3–2)	Minor (3–3)	**Osuna** (9)	26,657	23–15	W2
39	May 10	Rangers	3–0	**Verlander** (6–1)	Lynn (4–3)	**Osuna** (10)	33,023	24–15	W3
40	May 11	Rangers	11–4	**Cole** (4–4)	Smyly (0–3)	—	35,849	25–15	W4
41	May 12	Rangers	15–5	**Martin** (1–0)	Sampson (0–3)	—	41,027	26–15	W5
42	May 13	@ Tigers	8–1	**Peacock** (4–2)	Boyd (4–3)	—	15,086	27–15	W6
43	May 14	@ Tigers	11–4	**Miley** (4–2)	Carpenter (0–2)	—	14,261	28–15	W7
44	May 15	@ Tigers	5–1	**Verlander** (7–1)	Soto (0–2)	—	15,940	29–15	W8
45	May 17	@ Red Sox	3–1	**Harris** (1–0)	Porcello (3–4)	**Osuna** (11)	35,558	30–15	W9
46	May 18	@ Red Sox	7–3	**James** (1–0)	Velázquez (1–3)	—	36,887	31–15	W10
47	May 19	@ Red Sox	3–4	Walden (6–0)	**Valdez** (1–2)	Workman (1)	35,796	31–16	L1
48	May 20	White Sox	3–0	**Peacock** (5–2)	Burr (1–1)	**Osuna** (12)	24,364	32–16	W1
49	May 21	White Sox	5–1	**Verlander** (8–1)	Covey (0–3)	—	31,392	33–16	W2
50	May 22	White Sox	4–9	Nova (3–4)	**Cole** (4–5)	—	30,237	33–17	L1
51	May 23	White Sox	0–4	Giolito (6–1)	**Martin** (1–1)	—	26,073	33–18	L2
52	May 24	Red Sox	4–3	**Miley** (5–2)	Sale (1–6)	**Osuna** (13)	35,606	34–18	W1
53	May 25	Red Sox	4–3	**Osuna** (3–0)	Barnes (2–1)	—	40,722	35–18	W2
54	May 26	Red Sox	1–4	Rodríguez (5–3)	**Verlander** (8–2)	Walden (1)	41,502	35–19	L1
55	May 27	Cubs	6–5	**Cole** (5–5)	Hamels (4–1)	**Osuna** (14)	42,135	36–19	W1
56	May 28	Cubs	9–6	**James** (2–0)	Lester (3–4)	**Osuna** (15)	31,030	37–19	W2
57	May 29	Cubs	1–2	Hendricks (5–4)	**Miley** (5–3)	Cishek (5)	33,243	37–20	L1
58	May 31	@ A's	3–2	**Rondón** (3–1)	Trivino (2–2)	**Osuna** (16)	14,519	38–20	W1

June: 15–12 (Home: 9–5; Away: 6–7)

#	Date	Opponent	Score	Win	Loss	Save	Attendance	Record	Streak
59	June 1	@ A's	5–1	**Verlander** (9–2)	Anderson (6–4)	—	20,425	39–20	W2
60	June 2	@ A's	6–4 (12)	**James** (3–0)	Trivino (2–3)	—	23,144	40–20	W3
61	June 3	@ Mariners	4–2	**Valdez** (2–2)	Gearrin (0–2)	**Pressly** (3)	11,825	41–20	W4
62	June 4	@ Mariners	11–5	**Guduan** (1–0)	Brennan (2–4)	—	12,208	42–20	W5
63	June 5	@ Mariners	1–14	Leake (5–6)	**Peacock** (5–3)	—	13,652	42–21	L1
64	June 6	@ Mariners	8–7 (14)	**Devenski** (1–0)	Festa (0–1)	—	20,258	43–21	W1
65	June 7	Orioles	4–3 (11)	**Pérez** (1–0)	Kline (1–3)	—	35,414	44–21	W2
66	June 8	Orioles	1–4	Fry (1–3)	**Harris** (1–1)	Castro (2)	38,425	44–22	L1
67	June 9	Orioles	4–0	**Miley** (6–3)	Bundy (3–7)	**Osuna** (17)	35,621	45–22	W1
68	June 11	Brewers	10–8	**Peacock** (6–3)	Peralta (3–3)	—	35,928	46–22	W2
69	June 12	Brewers	3–6 (14)	Houser (2–1)	**Pérez** (1–1)	—	40,032	46–23	L1
70	June 14	Blue Jays	15–2	**Cole** (6–5)	Sanchez (3–8)	**Armenteros** (1)	34,719	47–23	W1
71	June 15	Blue Jays	7–2	**Valdez** (3–2)	Richard (0–3)	—	38,012	48–23	W2
72	June 16	Blue Jays	0–12	Thornton (2–5)	**Peacock** (6–4)	—	42,174	48–24	L1
73	June 17	@ Reds	2–3	Castillo (7–1)	**Miley** (6–4)	Lorenzen (3)	22,745	48–25	L2
74	June 18	@ Reds	3–4	DeSclafani (4–3)	**Verlander** (9–3)	Lorenzen (4)	25,347	48–26	L3
75	June 19	@ Reds	2–3	Bowman (1–0)	**Osuna** (3–1)	—	24,777	48–27	L4
76	June 20	@ Yankees	6–10	Cortes Jr. (2–0)	**Valdez** (3–3)	Chapman (20)	41,030	48–28	L5
77	June 21	@ Yankees	1–4	Paxton (5–3)	**Peacock** (6–5)	Chapman (21)	41,166	48–29	L6
78	June 22	@ Yankees	5–7	Holder (5–2)	**Pressly** (1–1)	Britton (3)	46,304	48–30	L7
79	June 23	@ Yankees	9–4	**Verlander** (10–3)	Happ (7–4)	—	46,769	49–30	W1
80	June 25	Pirates	5–1	**Cole** (7–5)	Williams (2–2)	—	37,193	50–30	W2
81	June 26	Pirates	2–14	Agrazal (1–0)	**Valdez** (3–4)	—	39,312	50–31	L1
82	June 27	Pirates	0–10	Musgrove (6–7)	**Peacock** (6–6)	—	38,943	50–32	L2
83	June 28	Mariners	2–1 (10)	**Harris** (2–1)	Festa (0–2)	—	32,828	51–32	W1
84	June 29	Mariners	6–5 (10)	**Devenski** (2–0)	Elías (2–1)	—	35,082	52–32	W2
85	June 30	Mariners	6–1	**Cole** (8–5)	Gonzales (9–7)	—	32,485	53–32	W3

July: 16–8 (Home: 7–2; Away: 9–6)

#	Date	Opponent	Score	Win	Loss	Save	Attendance	Record	Streak
86	July 2	@ Rockies	9–8	**Harris** (3–1)	McGee (0–1)	**Osuna** (18)	47,864	54–32	W4
87	July 3	@ Rockies	4–2	**Miley** (7–4)	Lambert (2–1)	**Osuna** (19)	48,308	55–32	W5
88	July 5	Angels	4–5	Peña (6–2)	**Verlander** (10–4)	Robles (12)	41,219	55–33	L1
89	July 6	Angels	4–0	**Cole** (9–5)	Heaney (1–3)	—	39,470	56–33	W1
90	July 7	Angels	11–10 (10)	**Pressly** (2–1)	Cole (0–1)	—	37,264	57–33	W2
ASG	July 9	NL @ AL	4–3	Tanaka (1–0)	Kershaw (0–1)	Chapman (1)	36,747	57–33	N/A
Representing the Astros: Alex Bregman, George Springer, Michael Brantley, Justin Verlander, Gerrit Cole & Ryan Pressly
91	July 11	@ Rangers	0–5	Lynn (12–4)	**Valdez** (3–5)	—	37,964	57–34	L1
92	July 12	@ Rangers	8–9	Kelley (5–2)	**Osuna** (3–2)	—	32,322	57–35	L2
93	July 13	@ Rangers	7–6 (11)	**James** (4–0)	Martin (1–1)	**Osuna** (20)	42,452	58–35	W1
94	July 14	@ Rangers	12–4	**Verlander** (11–4)	Jurado (5–5)	—	27,916	59–35	W2
95	July 15	@ Angels	6–9	Anderson (3–0)	**Valdez** (3–6)	Robles (14)	35,431	59–36	L1
96	July 16	@ Angels	2–7	Ramirez (4–1)	**Rondón** (3–2)	—	42,678	59–37	L2
97	July 17	@ Angels	11–2	**Cole** (10–5)	Peña (7–3)	—	35,738	60–37	W1
98	July 18	@ Angels	6–2	**Miley** (8–4)	Harvey (3–5)	—	35,928	61–37	W2
99	July 19	Rangers	4–3	**Verlander** (12–4)	Minor (8–5)	**Osuna** (21)	42,287	62–37	W3
100	July 20	Rangers	6–1	**Urquidy** (1–0)	Jurado (5–6)	—	41,643	63–37	W4
101	July 21	Rangers	5–3	**Armenteros** (1–0)	Lynn (12–6)	**Osuna** (22)	37,655	64–37	W5
102	July 22	A's	11–1	**Cole** (11–5)	Bailey (8–7)	—	41,534	65–37	W6
103	July 23	A's	3–4 (11)	Petit (3–2)	**McHugh** (3–5)	—	39,204	65–38	L1
104	July 24	A's	4–2	**Verlander** (13–4)	Bassitt (7–4)	**Osuna** (23)	41,838	66–38	W1
105	July 26	@ Cardinals	3–5	Miller (4–4)	**Pressly** (2–2)	Martínez (10)	44,724	66–39	L1
106	July 27	@ Cardinals	8–2	**Cole** (12–5)	Ponce de Leon (1–1)	—	46,518	67–39	W1
107	July 28	@ Cardinals	6–2	**Miley** (9–4)	Hudson (10–5)	—	46,714	68–39	W2
108	July 30	@ Indians	2–0	**Verlander** (14–4)	Bieber (10–4)	**Osuna** (24)	21,589	69–39	W3
109	July 31	@ Indians	4–10	Plesac (6–3)	**Urquidy** (1–1)	—	23,961	69–40	L1

August: 19–9 (Home: 13–2; Away: 6–7)

#	Date	Opponent	Score	Win	Loss	Save	Attendance	Record	Streak
110	August 1	@ Indians	7–1	**Cole** (13–5)	Salazar (0–1)	—	21,536	70–40	W1
111	August 2	Mariners	10–2	**Miley** (10–4)	Kikuchi (4–8)	—	41,444	71–40	W2
112	August 3	Mariners	9–0	**Sanchez** (4–14)	Gonzales (12–9)	—	37,059	72–40	W3
113	August 4	Mariners	3–1	**Verlander** (15–4)	Milone (1–6)	**Osuna** (25)	39,667	73–40	W4
114	August 6	Rockies	11–6	**Greinke** (11–4)	Gonzalez (0–4)	—	43,243	74–40	W5
115	August 7	Rockies	14–3	**Cole** (14–5)	Lambert (2–3)	—	35,566	75–40	W6
116	August 9	@ Orioles	3–2	**Miley** (11–4)	Bundy (5–12)	**Osuna** (26)	19,407	76–40	W7
117	August 10	@ Orioles	23–2	**Sanchez** (5–14)	Brooks (2–6)	—	21,903	77–40	W8
118	August 11	@ Orioles	7–8	Bleier (3–0)	**Osuna** (3–3)	—	17,979	77–41	L1
—	August 12	@ White Sox	Postponed (Inclement Weather, makeup date on August 13)						
119	August 13	@ White Sox	6–2	**Greinke** (12–4)	Cease (2–5)	—	N/A	78–41	W1
120	August 13	@ White Sox	1–4	Nova (8–9)	**Devenski** (2–1)	—	19,559	78–42	L1
121	August 14	@ White Sox	9–13	Colomé (4–2)	**Pressly** (2–3)	—	18,899	78–43	L2
122	August 15	@ A's	6–7	Diekman (1–6)	**Devenski** (2–2)	Hendriks (14)	15,323	78–44	L3
123	August 16	@ A's	2–3 (13)	Trivino (4–5)	**Sneed** (0–1)	—	22,768	78–45	L4
124	August 17	@ A's	4–8	Bassitt (9–5)	**Armenteros** (1–1)	—	21,428	78–46	L5
125	August 18	@ A's	4–1	**Greinke** (13–4)	Anderson (10–9)	**Osuna** (27)	22,372	79–46	W1
126	August 19	Tigers	5–4	**Miley** (12–4)	Jackson (3–6)	**Osuna** (28)	40,499	80–46	W2
127	August 20	Tigers	6–3	**Peacock** (7–6)	Turnbull (3–12)	**Osuna** (29)	30,143	81–46	W3
128	August 21	Tigers	1–2	Farmer (5–4)	**Verlander** (15–5)	Jiménez (4)	29,567	81–47	L1
129	August 22	Tigers	6–3	**Cole** (15–5)	Zimmermann (1–9)	**Osuna** (30)	27,220	82–47	W1
130	August 23	Angels	5–4	**Greinke** (14–4)	Suárez (2–5)	**Osuna** (31)	35,201	83–47	W2
131	August 24	Angels	5–2	**Miley** (13–4)	Peters (3–2)	**Harris** (1)	37,862	84–47	W3
132	August 25	Angels	11–2	**Valdez** (4–6)	Barría (4–7)	—	38,989	85–47	W4
133	August 27	Rays	15–1	**Verlander** (16–5)	Morton (13–6)	—	28,454	86–47	W5
134	August 28	Rays	8–6	**Harris** (4–1)	Castillo (2–8)	—	25,539	87–47	W6
135	August 29	Rays	8–9	De León (1–0)	**Devenski** (2–3)	Pagán (15)	33,051	87–48	L1
136	August 30	@ Blue Jays	7–4	**McHugh** (4–5)	Thornton (4–9)	—	25,289	88–48	W1
137	August 31	@ Blue Jays	4–6	Buchholz (1–3)	**Valdez** (4–7)	Giles (18)	26,414	88–49	L1

September: 19–6 (Home: 9–4; Away: 10–2)

#	Date	Opponent	Score	Win	Loss	Save	Attendance	Record	Streak
138	September 1	@ Blue Jays	2–0	**Verlander** (17–5)	Giles (2–3)	—	24,104	89–49	W1
139	September 2	@ Brewers	3–2 (10)	**Osuna** (4–3)	Guerra (8–5)	**James** (1)	39,046	90–49	W2
140	September 3	@ Brewers	2–4	Lyles (10–8)	**Greinke** (14–5)	Hader (28)	29,335	90–50	L1
141	September 5	Mariners	11–9 (13)	**James** (5–0)	Wisler (3–4)	—	27,822	91–50	W1
142	September 6	Mariners	7–4	**Smith** (1–0)	Milone (3–9)	**Osuna** (32)	33,149	92–50	W2
143	September 7	Mariners	2–1	**Verlander** (18–5)	Adams (1–2)	**Harris** (2)	41,958	93–50	W3
144	September 8	Mariners	21–1	**Cole** (16–5)	Hernández (1–6)	—	35,569	94–50	W4
145	September 9	A's	15–0	**Greinke** (15–5)	Fiers (14–4)	—	38,289	95–50	W5
146	September 10	A's	7–21	Roark (10–8)	**Miley** (13–5)	Mengden (1)	32,100	95–51	L1
147	September 11	A's	3–5	Anderson (12–9)	**James** (5–1)	Hendriks (20)	32,938	95–52	L2
148	September 12	A's	2–3	Bailey (13–8)	**Verlander** (18–6)	Hendriks (21)	34,024	95–53	L3
149	September 13	@ Royals	4–1	**Cole** (17–5)	Fillmyer (0–2)	**Osuna** (33)	20,593	96–53	W1
150	September 14	@ Royals	6–1	**Greinke** (16–5)	Montgomery (3–9)	—	20,716	97–53	W2
151	September 15	@ Royals	12–3	**Miley** (14–5)	Junis (9–14)	—	17,205	98–53	W3
152	September 17	Rangers	4–1	**Verlander** (19–6)	Lynn (14–11)	**Osuna** (34)	39,650	99–53	W4
153	September 18	Rangers	3–2	**Cole** (18–5)	Allard (4–1)	**Osuna** (35)	38,417	100–53	W5
154	September 20	Angels	6–4	**Greinke** (17–5)	Barría (4–10)	**Osuna** (36)	40,106	101–53	W6
155	September 21	Angels	4–8	Bard (3–2)	**Miley** (14–6)	—	43,264	101–54	L1
156	September 22	Angels	13–5	**Verlander** (20–6)	Rodríguez (0–1)	—	43,169	102–54	W1
157	September 24	@ Mariners	3–0	**Cole** (19–5)	Milone (4–10)	**Osuna** (37)	11,259	103–54	W2
158	September 25	@ Mariners	3–0	**Greinke** (18–5)	Kikuchi (6–11)	**Harris** (3)	10,916	104–54	W3
159	September 26	@ Angels	3–4 (12)	Cahill (4–9)	**Biagini** (3–2)	—	39,658	104–55	L1
160	September 27	@ Angels	4–0	**Urquidy** (2–1)	Sandoval (0–4)	—	41,763	105–55	W1
161	September 28	@ Angels	6–3	**Verlander** (21–6)	Bard (3–3)	**Osuna** (38)	35,814	106–55	W2
162	September 29	@ Angels	8–5	**Cole** (20–5)	Peters (4–4)	**Harris** (4)	34,693	107–55	W3

Legend: = Win = Loss = Game postponed
Bold = Astros team member

=== Season standings ===
==== American League West ====
AL West
Team	W	L	Pct.	GB	Home	Road
Houston Astros	107	55	.660	—	60‍–‍21	47‍–‍34
Oakland Athletics	97	65	.599	10	52‍–‍29	45‍–‍36
Texas Rangers	78	84	.481	29	45‍–‍36	33‍–‍48
Los Angeles Angels	72	90	.444	35	38‍–‍43	34‍–‍47
Seattle Mariners	68	94	.420	39	35‍–‍46	33‍–‍48

==== American League Wild Card ====
AL Wild Card standings

Division leaders
Team	W	L	Pct.
Houston Astros	107	55	.660
New York Yankees	103	59	.636
Minnesota Twins	101	61	.623

Wild Card teams (Top 2 teams qualify for postseason)
Team	W	L	Pct.	GB
Oakland Athletics	97	65	.599	+1
Tampa Bay Rays	96	66	.593	—
Cleveland Indians	93	69	.574	3
Boston Red Sox	84	78	.519	12
Texas Rangers	78	84	.481	18
Chicago White Sox	72	89	.447	23½
Los Angeles Angels	72	90	.444	24
Seattle Mariners	68	94	.420	28
Toronto Blue Jays	67	95	.414	29
Kansas City Royals	59	103	.364	37
Baltimore Orioles	54	108	.333	42
Detroit Tigers	47	114	.292	48½

==== Record versus opponents ====
American League

2019 American League record Source: MLB Standings Grid – 2019
Team	BAL	BOS	CWS	CLE	DET	HOU	KC	LAA	MIN	NYY	OAK	SEA	TB	TEX	TOR	NL
Baltimore	—	7–12	3–3	3–4	3–4	2–4	3–3	4–3	0–6	2–17	1–6	3–4	7–12	1–6	8–11	7–13
Boston	12–7	—	5–2	3–3	5–2	2–4	5–1	4–3	3–3	5–14	4–3	4–3	7–12	4–3	11–8	10–10
Chicago	3–3	2–5	—	11–8	12–6	4–3	9–10	2–5	6–13	4–3	1–5	2–4	2–4	4–3	4–3	6–14
Cleveland	4–3	3–3	8–11	—	18–1	3–4	12–7	6–0	10–9	4–3	1–5	5–1	1–6	4–3	6–1	8–12
Detroit	4–3	2–5	6–12	1–18	—	1–6	10–9	3–3	5–14	3–3	1–6	1–6	2–4	0–6	3–4	5–15
Houston	4–2	4–2	3–4	4–3	6–1	—	5–1	14–5	3–4	4–3	11–8	18–1	3–4	13–6	4–2	11–9
Kansas City	3–3	1–5	10–9	7–12	9–10	1–5	—	2–4	5–14	2–5	2–5	2–5	3–4	2–5	1–6	9–11
Los Angeles	3–4	3–4	5–2	0–6	3–3	5–14	4–2	—	1–5	2–5	6–13	10–9	3–4	9–10	6–1	12–8
Minnesota	6–0	3–3	13–6	9–10	14–5	4–3	14–5	5–1	—	2–4	3–4	5–2	5–2	6–1	4–3	8–12
New York	17–2	14–5	3–4	3–4	3–3	3–4	5–2	5–2	4–2	—	2–4	6–1	12–7	3–3	11–8	12–8
Oakland	6–1	3–4	5–1	5–1	6–1	8–11	5–2	13–6	4–3	4–2	—	10–9	4–3	13–6	0–6	11–9
Seattle	4–3	3–4	4–2	1–5	6–1	1–18	5–2	9–10	2–5	1–6	9–10	—	2–4	8–11	4–2	9–11
Tampa Bay	12–7	12–7	4–2	6–1	4–2	4–3	4–3	4–3	2–5	7–12	3–4	4–2	—	3–3	13–6	14–6
Texas	6–1	3–4	3–4	3–4	6–0	6–13	5–2	10–9	1–6	3–3	6–13	11–8	3–3	—	3–3	9–11
Toronto	11–8	8–11	3–4	1–6	4–3	2–4	6–1	1–6	3–4	8–11	6–0	2–4	6–13	3–3	—	3–17

=== Bating orders ===
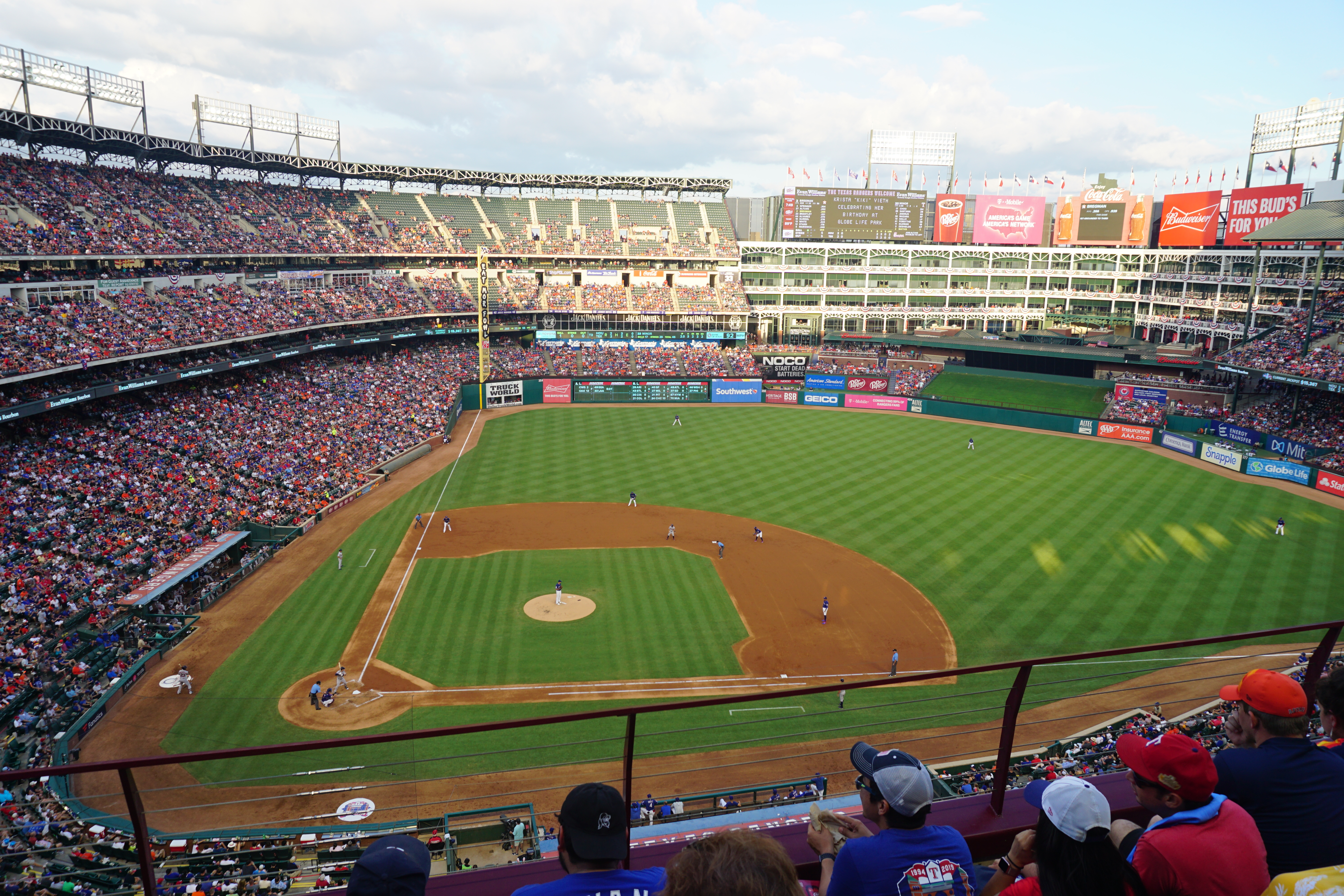
The Astros playing at Texas on July 13

No.	Most common (6×)	Most appearances
1	Springer	Springer (119)
2	Altuve	Altuve (106)
3	Bregman	Bregman (78) • Brantley (72)
4	Brantley	Brantley (52) • Bregman (34)
5	Correa	Gurriel (51) • Alvarez (46)
6	Gurriel	Gurriel (53) • Reddick (46)
7	Reddick	Reddick (37) • Chirinos (24) • Díaz (24)
8	Chirinos	Chirinos (46)
9	Kemp	Marisnick (56)

== Player statistics ==
Table legend
*	Left-handed batter or pitcher	League leader (Bold: MLB leader)
#	Switch hitter	League top ten
	Leader in appearances at position	MLB top ten (multiple teams)
		Team leader

=== Batting ===
Statistics legend
⌖	Primary position	AB	At bats	2B	Doubles	RBI	Runs batted in	SB	Stolen bases	SLG	Slugging percentage
G	Games played	R	Runs scored	3B	Triples	BB	Bases on balls	AVG	Batting average	OPS	On-base plus slugging percentage
PA	Plate appearances	H	Hits	HR	Home runs	SO	Strikeouts	OBP	On-base percentage

Regular season results
⌖	Player	G	PA	AB	R	H	2B	3B	HR	RBI	SB	BB	SO	AVG	OBP	SLG	OPS
C	Robinson Chirinos	114	437	366	57	87	22	1	17	58	1	51	125	.238	.347	.443	.790
1B	Yuli Gurriel	144	612	564	85	168	40	2	31	104	5	37	65	.298	.343	.541	.884
2B	Jose Altuve	124	548	500	89	149	27	3	31	74	6	41	82	.298	.353	.550	.903
3B	Alex Bregman	156	690	554	122	164	37	2	41	112	5	**119**	83	.296	.423	.592	1.015
SS	Carlos Correa	75	321	280	42	78	16	1	21	59	1	35	75	.279	.358	.568	.926
LF	Michael Brantley *	148	637	575	88	179	40	2	22	90	3	51	66	.311	.372	.503	.875
CF	Jake Marisnick	120	318	292	46	68	16	3	10	34	10	17	95	.233	.289	.411	.700
RF	Josh Reddick *	141	550	501	57	138	19	3	14	56	5	36	66	.275	.319	.409	.729
DH	Yordan Alvarez *	87	369	313	58	98	26	0	27	78	0	52	94	.313	.412	.655	1.067
OF	George Springer	122	556	479	96	140	20	3	39	96	6	67	113	.292	.383	.591	.974
1B	Tyler White	71	253	218	16	49	14	0	3	21	0	32	74	.225	.320	.330	.650
IF	Aledmys Díaz	69	247	210	36	57	12	1	9	40	2	26	28	.271	.356	.467	.823
2B	Tony Kemp*	66	186	163	23	37	6	2	7	17	4	16	29	.227	.308	.417	.725
SS	Myles Straw	56	128	108	27	29	4	2	0	7	8	19	24	.269	.378	.343	.721
C	Martín Maldonado	27	98	84	20	17	4	0	6	10	0	13	26	.202	.316	.464	.781
C	Max Stassi	31	98	90	4	15	1	0	1	3	0	7	34	.167	.235	.211	.446
3B	Abraham Toro ^{#}	25	89	78	13	17	3	2	2	9	1	9	19	.218	.303	.385	.688
UT	Kyle Tucker *	22	72	67	15	18	6	0	4	11	5	4	20	.269	.319	.537	.857
SS	Jack Mayfield	26	65	64	8	10	5	0	2	5	0	1	16	.156	.169	.328	.497
OF	Derek Fisher *	17	60	53	9	12	2	1	1	5	4	7	14	.226	.317	.358	.675
UT	Garrett Stubbs *	19	39	35	8	7	3	0	0	2	1	4	7	.200	.282	.286	.568
	**Pitcher totals**		21	19	1	1	0	0	0	0	0	1	11	.053	.100	.053	.153
**Team totals**		**162**	**6394**	**5613**	**920**	**1538**	**323**	**28**	**288**	**891**	**67**	**645**	**1166**	**.274**	**.352**	**.495**	**.848**

=== Pitching ===
Statistics legend
⌖	Primary role	ERA	Earned run average	GF	Games finished	IP	Innings pitched	ER	Earned runs allowed	WHIP	Walks plus hits per inning pitched
W	Wins	G	Games pitched	SV	Saves	H	Hits allowed	BB	Base on balls	K/BB	Strikeout-to-walk ratio
L	Losses	GS	Games started	HD	Holds	R	Runs allowed	SO	Strikeouts

Regular season results
⌖	Player	W	L	ERA	G	GS	GF	SV	HD	IP	H	R	ER	BB	SO	WHIP
SP	Justin Verlander	**21**	6	2.58	34	**34**	0	0	0	**223**	137	66	64	42	300	**0.803**
SP	Gerrit Cole	20	5	2.50	33	33	0	0	0	212 1/3	142	66	59	48	**326**	0.895
SP	Wade Miley*	14	6	3.98	33	33	0	0	0	167 1/3	164	83	74	61	140	1.345
SP	Brad Peacock	7	6	4.12	23	15	1	0	0	91 2/3	78	43	42	31	96	1.189
CL	Roberto Osuna	4	3	2.63	66	0	**56**	38	0	65	45	20	19	12	73	0.877
SU	Will Harris	4	1	1.50	68	0	10	4	26	60	42	14	10	14	62	0.933
SU	Ryan Pressly	2	3	2.32	55	0	8	3	**31**	54 1/3	37	15	14	12	72	0.902
MR	Chris Devenski	2	3	4.83	61	1	19	0	7	69	69	39	37	21	72	1.304
MR	Josh James	5	1	4.70	49	1	18	1	6	61 1/3	46	34	32	35	100	1.321
MR	Héctor Rondón	3	2	3.71	62	1	5	0	19	60 2/3	56	25	25	20	48	1.253
SW	Collin McHugh	4	5	4.70	35	8	8	0	5	74 2/3	62	41	39	30	82	1.232
SW	Framber Valdez*	4	7	5.86	26	8	7	0	0	70 2/3	74	51	46	44	68	1.670
SP	Zack Greinke	8	1	3.02	10	10	0	0	0	62 2/3	58	25	21	9	52	1.069
SP	José Urquidy	2	1	3.95	9	7	0	0	0	41	38	18	18	7	40	1.098
RP	Joe Smith	1	0	1.80	28	0	4	0	4	25	19	6	5	5	22	0.960
RP	Cy Sneed	0	1	5.48	8	0	4	0	0	21 1/3	26	13	13	5	23	1.453
SP	Corbin Martin	1	1	5.59	5	5	0	0	0	19 1/3	23	14	12	12	19	1.810
SP	Aaron Sanchez	2	0	4.82	4	4	0	0	0	18 2/3	14	10	10	9	16	1.232
RP	Rogelio Armenteros	1	1	4.00	5	2	2	1	0	18	17	9	8	5	18	1.222
RP	Joe Biagini	0	1	7.36	13	0	4	0	1	14 2/3	21	13	12	9	10	2.045
RP	Cionel Pérez *	1	1	10.00	5	0	3	0	0	9	11	10	10	2	7	1.444
RP	Bryan Abreu	0	0	1.04	7	0	2	0	0	8 2/3	4	1	1	3	13	0.808
RP	Reymin Guduan *	1	0	11.81	7	0	3	0	0	5 1/3	8	7	7	4	6	2.250
RP	Brady Rodgers	0	0	16.20	3	0	2	0	0	5	7	9	9	3	4	2.000
PO	Tyler White	0	0	21.60	4	0	3	0	0	3 1/3	7	8	8	5	2	3.600
PO	Max Stassi	0	0	0.00	1	0	1	0	0	1/3	0	0	0	0	0	0.000
**Team totals**		**107**	**55**	**3.66**	**162**	**162**	**160**	**47**	**99**	**1462 1/3**	**1205**	**640**	**595**	**448**	**1671**	**1.130**
Other: Complete games—Verlander (2) • Shutouts—Verlander (1) • Sources:

== Postseason ==
=== Summary ===
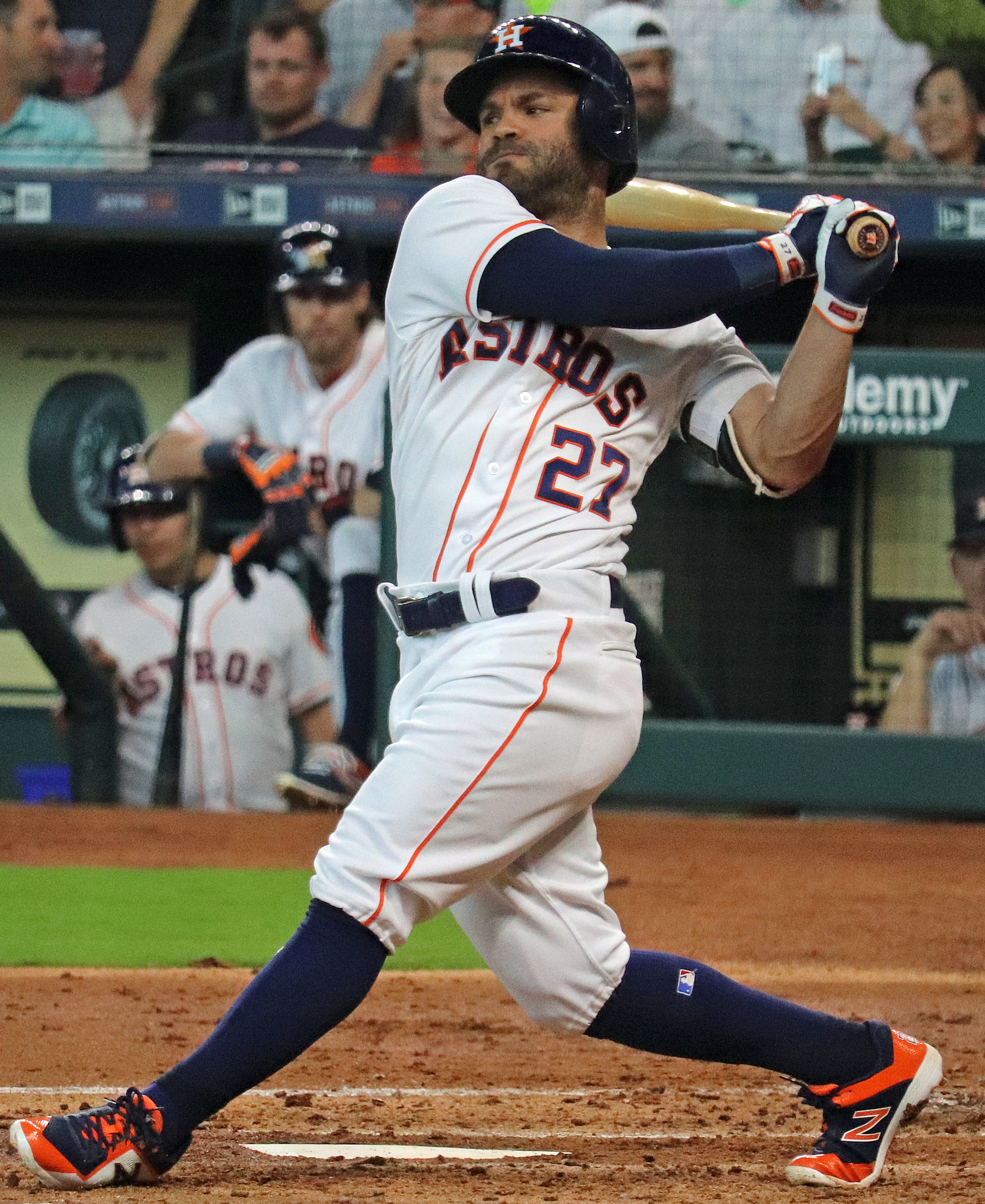
ALCS MVP Jose Altuve at bat.

In the clubhouse following their American League Championship Series (ALCS) victory, Houston assistant general manager Brandon Taubman taunted female reporters. The team initially denied a Sports Illustrated report about his behavior, and accused the publication of making up the story. The Astros later fired Taubman, retracted their statement and issued an apology.

In Game 4 of the World Series, Alex Bregman hit the Astros' first-ever grand slam in the Fall Classic, and just the second-ever in the playoffs for the team, following Lance Berkman's blast in Game 4 of the 2005 National League Division Series (NLDS).

Despite the World Series upset, the 2019 Astros team is considered to have put together one of the best regular seasons in the history of baseball with its historic 107-win campaign and record-breaking individual achievements. With seven 2019 All-Stars on its postseason squad, the Astros fielded among the most in baseball history.

=== Game log ===
2019 Postseason Game Log: (10–8)
ALDS vs Rays: (3–2)

#	Date	Opponent	Score	Win	Loss	Save	Attendance	Record	Streak
1	October 4	Rays	6–2	Verlander (1–0)	Glasnow (0–1)	—	43,360	1–0	W1
2	October 5	Rays	3–1	Cole (1–0)	Snell (0–1)	Harris (1)	43,378	2–0	W2
3	October 7	@ Rays	3–10	Morton (1–0)	Greinke (0–1)	—	32,251	2–1	L1
4	October 8	@ Rays	1–4	Yarbrough (1–0)	Verlander (1–1)	Snell (1)	32,178	2–2	L2
5	October 10	Rays	6–1	Cole (2–0)	Glasnow (0–2)	—	43,418	3–2	W1

ALCS vs Yankees: (4–2)

#	Date	Opponent	Score	Win	Loss	Save	Attendance	Record	Streak
1	October 12	Yankees	0–7	Tanaka (1–0)	Greinke (0–1)	—	43,311	0–1	L1
2	October 13	Yankees	3–2 (11)	James (1–0)	Happ (0–1)	—	43,359	1–1	W1
3	October 15	@ Yankees	4–1	Cole (1–0)	Severino (0–1)	Osuna (1)	48,998	2–1	W2
—	October 16	@ Yankees	Postponed (Inclement Weather, makeup date on October 17)						
4	October 17	@ Yankees	8–3	Pressly (1–0)	Tanaka (1–1)	—	49,067	3–1	W3
5	October 18	@ Yankees	1–4	Paxton (1–0)	Verlander (0–1)	Chapman (1)	48,483	3–2	L1
6	October 19	Yankees	6–4	Osuna (1–0)	Chapman (0–1)	—	43,357	4–2	W1

WS vs Nationals: (3–4)

#	Date	Opponent	Score	Win	Loss	Save	Attendance	Record	Streak
1	October 22	Nationals	4–5	Scherzer (1–0)	Cole (0–1)	Doolittle (1)	43,339	0–1	L1
2	October 23	Nationals	3–12	Strasburg (1–0)	Verlander (0–1)	—	43,357	0–2	L2
3	October 25	@ Nationals	4–1	James (1–0)	Sánchez (0–1)	Osuna (1)	43,867	1–2	W1
4	October 26	@ Nationals	8–1	Urquidy (1–0)	Corbin (0–1)	—	43,889	2–2	W2
5	October 27	@ Nationals	7–1	Cole (1–1)	Ross (0–1)	—	43,910	3–2	W3
6	October 29	Nationals	2–7	Strasburg (2–0)	Verlander (0–2)	—	43,384	3–3	L1
7	October 30	Nationals	2–6	Corbin (1–1)	Harris (0–1)	—	43,326	3–4	L2

=== Postseason rosters ===
Playoff rosters
American League Division Series

- Pitchers: 20 Wade Miley 21 Zack Greinke 30 Héctor Rondón 35 Justin Verlander 36 Will Harris 38 Joe Smith 39 Josh James 45 Gerrit Cole 54 Roberto Osuna 55 Ryan Pressly 65 José Urquidy
- Catchers: 12 Martín Maldonado 28 Robinson Chirinos
- Infielders: 1 Carlos Correa 2 Alex Bregman 10 Yuli Gurriel 16 Aledmys Díaz 27 Jose Altuve
- Outfielders: 3 Kyle Tucker 4 George Springer 6 Jake Marisnick 22 Josh Reddick 23 Michael Brantley 26 Myles Straw 44 Yordan Alvarez

American League Championship Series

- Pitchers: 21 Zack Greinke 30 Héctor Rondón 35 Justin Verlander 36 Will Harris 38 Joe Smith 39 Josh James 41 Brad Peacock 45 Gerrit Cole 54 Roberto Osuna 55 Ryan Pressly 65 José Urquidy 66 Bryan Abreu
- Catchers: 12 Martín Maldonado 28 Robinson Chirinos
- Infielders: 1 Carlos Correa 2 Alex Bregman 10 Yuli Gurriel 16 Aledmys Díaz 27 Jose Altuve
- Outfielders: 3 Kyle Tucker 4 George Springer 6 Jake Marisnick 22 Josh Reddick 23 Michael Brantley 44 Yordan Alvarez

World Series

- Pitchers: 21 Zack Greinke 30 Héctor Rondón 35 Justin Verlander 36 Will Harris 38 Joe Smith 39 Josh James 41 Brad Peacock 45 Gerrit Cole 47 Chris Devenski 54 Roberto Osuna 55 Ryan Pressly 65 José Urquidy
- Catchers: 12 Martín Maldonado 28 Robinson Chirinos
- Infielders: 1 Carlos Correa 2 Alex Bregman 10 Yuli Gurriel 16 Aledmys Díaz 27 Jose Altuve
- Outfielders: 3 Kyle Tucker 4 George Springer 6 Jake Marisnick 22 Josh Reddick 23 Michael Brantley 44 Yordan Alvarez

== Major League Baseball draft ==
Houston Astros 2019 MLB draft selections
Rd.	Slot	Draftee	Position	School	Origin	Signed	Notes	Bio
1	32	Korey Lee	Catcher	California	(California)	Y	(Note: MLB debut on July 1, 2022, with Houston)	
2	68	Grae Kessinger	Shortstop	Mississippi • 2019	(Mississippi)	Y	(Note: MLB debut on June 7, 2023, with Houston)	
5	166	Hunter Brown	Right-handed pitcher	Wayne State	(Michigan)	Y	(Note: MLB debut on September 5, 2022, with Houston)	

== Awards and achievements ==
=== Grand slams ===
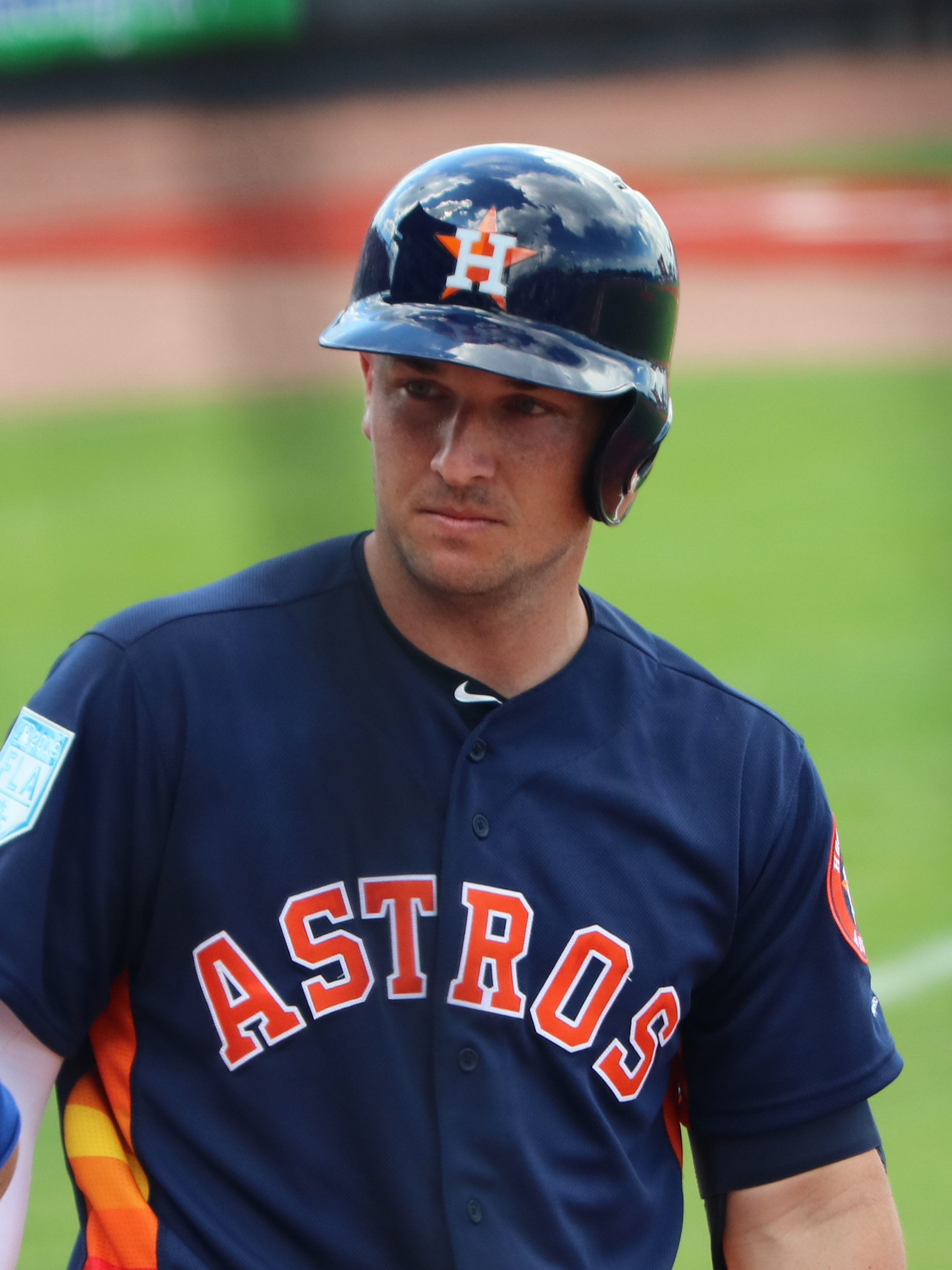
Third baseman Alex Bregman hit the first grand slam in World Series play for the Astros.

No.	Date	Astros batter	H/A	Inning	Pitcher	Opposing team
1	April 12	Jose Altuve	Away	6 (Note: Tied score or took lead)	Shawn Armstrong	Seattle Mariners
2	April 12	Yuli Gurriel	Away	8	R. J. Alaniz	Seattle Mariners
3	April 16	Alex Bregman	Away	4	Liam Hendriks	Oakland Athletics
4	May 5	Alex Bregman	Away	5	Cam Bedrosian	Los Angeles Angels
5	May 11	Aledmys Díaz	Home	6	Kyle Dowdy	Texas Rangers
6	June 14	Robinson Chirinos (Note: 1st MLB grand slam)	Home	8	Thomas Pannone	Toronto Blue Jays
7	June 23	Tyler White	Away	4	J. A. Happ	New York Yankees
8	July 7	Yuli Gurriel	Home	6	Cam Bedrosian	Los Angeles Angels
9	July 14	Jose Altuve	Away	7	Kyle Bird	Texas Rangers
10	July 27	Carlos Correa	Away	3	Michael Wacha	St. Louis Cardinals
11	August 10	Yordan Alvarez (Note: One of three home runs)	Away	7	Tayler Scott	Baltimore Orioles
12 (Note: Game 4 of World Series)	October 26	Alex Bregman	Away	7	Fernando Rodney	Washington Nationals
	Hit during playoffs					

=== Pitching achievements ===
==== 300 strikeout club ====
Player	K	W–L	ERA	K/9
Gerrit Cole	326	20–5	2.50	13.8
Justin Verlander	300	21–6	2.58	12.1

==== No-hit games ====
Date	Pitcher	IP	BB	BR	K	Pit.	BF	Catcher	Final	Opponent	Venue	Plate umpire	Box
August 3, 2019	Aaron Sanchez	6	2	3	6	92	21	Martín Maldonado	9–0	Seattle Mariners	Minute Maid Park	Jim Wolf	
August 3, 2019	Will Harris	1	1	1	0	12	3	Martín Maldonado	9–0	Seattle Mariners	Minute Maid Park	Jim Wolf	
August 3, 2019	Joe Biagini	1	1	1	1	22	4	Martín Maldonado	9–0	Seattle Mariners	Minute Maid Park	Jim Wolf	
August 3, 2019	Chris Devenski	1	0	0	1	12	3	Martín Maldonado	9–0	Seattle Mariners	Minute Maid Park	Jim Wolf	
August 3, 2019	Sanchez: Game score: 76 • Win (4–14)												
September 1, 2019	Justin Verlander	9	1	1	14	120	28	Robinson Chirinos	2–0	Toronto Blue Jays	Rogers Centre	Paul Emmel	
September 1, 2019	Verlander: Game score: 100 • Win (17–5)												

==== No-hit bid ====
Date	Starting pitcher (IP)	Relief pitcher(s) (IP)	No-hit IP	GS	Catcher	Batter	Final	Opponent	Box
September 25, 2019	Zack Greinke (8 1/3)	—	8 1/3	87	Robinson Chirinos	Austin Nola	3–0	Seattle Mariners	
Note: Includes those games started with 7 or more no-hit innings.

==== Immaculate inning ====
Date	Pitcher	Inn.	Sw.	Ctc.	ꓘ	Catcher	Batters	Final	Opponent	Venue	Plate umpire	Box
September 27, 2019	Will Harris	8	6	0	3	Robinson Chirinos	Kaleb Cowart, Matt Thaiss, Michael Hermosillo	4–0	Los Angeles	Angel Stadium	Ben May	
September 27, 2019	Urquidy—Game score: 67 • Win (2–1) • Pressly—Hold (30)											

=== Awards ===
2019 Houston Astros award winners
Name of award			Recipient	Ref.
All-MLB Team	First Team	Starting pitcher	Gerrit Cole	
All-MLB Team	First Team	Starting pitcher	Justin Verlander	
All-MLB Team	Second Team	Second baseman	Jose Altuve	
All-MLB Team	Second Team	Third baseman	Alex Bregman	
All-MLB Team	Second Team	Designated hitter	Yordan Alvarez	
All-MLB Team	Second Team	Starting pitcher	Zack Greinke	
American League Championship Series Most Valuable Player (ALCS MVP)			Jose Altuve	
American League (AL) Cy Young Award			Justin Verlander	
American League (AL) Pitcher of the Month		June	Gerrit Cole	
American League (AL) Pitcher of the Month		July	Gerrit Cole	
American League (AL) Pitcher of the Month		September	Gerrit Cole	
American League (AL) Player of the Month		July	Yuli Gurriel	
American League (AL) Player of the Month		August	Alex Bregman	
American League (AL) Player of the Week		May 12	George Springer	
American League (AL) Player of the Week		July 7	Yuli Gurriel	
American League (AL) Player of the Week		September 1	Justin Verlander	
American League (AL) Player of the Week		September 29	Gerrit Cole	
American League (AL) Rookie of the Month		June	Yordan Alvarez	
American League (AL) Rookie of the Month		July	Yordan Alvarez	
American League (AL) Rookie of the Month		August	Yordan Alvarez	
American League (AL) Rookie of the Year			Yordan Alvarez	
Baseball America Major League Player of the Year			Justin Verlander	
Darryl Kile Good Guy Award			Will Harris	
Fielding Bible		Pitcher	Zack Greinke	
Fred Hartman Award for Long and Meritorious Service to Baseball			Robert Ford	
Gold Glove Award		Pitcher	Zack Greinke	
Hickok Belt		September	Gerrit Cole	
Houston Astros		Most Valuable Player (MVP)	Alex Bregman	
Houston Astros		Pitcher of the Year	Justin Verlander	
Houston Astros		Rookie of the Year	Yordan Alvarez	
MLB All-Star Game		Starting pitcher	Justin Verlander	
MLB All-Star Game		Starting third baseman	Alex Bregman	
MLB All-Star Game		Starting left fielder	Michael Brantley	
MLB All-Star Game		Starting right fielder	George Springer	
MLB All-Star Game		Reserve pitcher	Gerrit Cole	
MLB All-Star Game		Reserve pitcher	Zack Greinke	
MLB All-Star Game		Reserve pitcher	Ryan Pressly	
Players Choice Awards		AL Outstanding Pitcher	Justin Verlander	
Players Choice Awards		AL Outstanding Rookie	Yordan Alvarez	
Silver Slugger Award		Third baseman	Alex Bregman	
Silver Slugger Award		Outfielder	George Springer	
The Sporting News	AL All-Star	Third baseman	Alex Bregman	
The Sporting News	AL All-Star	Outfielder	George Springer	
The Sporting News	AL Starting Pitcher of the Year		Gerrit Cole	
The Sporting News	AL Rookie of the Year		Yordan Alvarez	
Topps All-Star Rookie Team		Designated hitter	Yordan Alvarez	
Wilson	Defensive Team of the Year		Houston Astros	
Wilson	Defensive Player of the Year	Pitcher	Zack Greinke	

Other awards results

Name of award	Voting recipient(s) (Team)	Ref.
AL Cy Young	1st—Verlander (HOU) • 2nd—Cole (HOU)	
AL Manager of the Year	1st—Baldelli (MIN) • 5th—Hinch (HOU)	
AL Most Valuable Player	1st—Trout (LAA) • 2nd—Bregman (HOU) • 7th—Springer (HOU); Other Astros: 10th—Cole • 11th—Verlander	
Heart & Hustle	Winner—Kendrick (WAS) • Nominee—Marisnick (HOU)	
Roberto Clemente	Winner—Carrasco (CLE) • Nominee—Bregman (HOU)	

=== League leaders ===
==== All players ====
2019 AL player value leaders
Category	Player	Figure	Rank
Wins Above Replacement (WAR)— all (Note: Per Baseball-Reference.com.)	Alex Bregman	8.9	1st
Wins Above Replacement (WAR)— all	Justin Verlander	7.3	7th
Wins Above Replacement (WAR)— all	Gerrit Cole	6.5	9th
Wins Above Replacement (WAR)— all	George Springer	6.4	10th
WAR—defense	Robinson Chirinos	1.8	3rd
WAR—defense	Alex Bregman	1.7	9th

==== Batting ====
2019 AL batting leaders
Category	Player	Figure	Rank
Wins Above Replacement (WAR)— position players	Alex Bregman	8.9	1st
Wins Above Replacement (WAR)— position players	George Springer	6.4	6th
WAR—offense	Alex Bregman	7.8	2nd
WAR—offense	George Springer	5.1	9th
Batting average (AVG)	Michael Brantley	.311	4th
On-base percentage (OBP)	Alex Bregman	.423	2nd
On-base percentage (OBP)	George Springer	.383	8th
Slugging percentage (SLG)	Alex Bregman	.592	3rd
Slugging percentage (SLG)	George Springer	.591	4th
Slugging percentage (SLG)	Jose Altuve	.550	10th
On-base plus slugging (OPS)	Alex Bregman	1.015	3rd
On-base plus slugging (OPS)	George Springer	.974	4th
Games played	Alex Bregman	156	7th
Plate appearances	Alex Bregman	690	9th
Runs scored	Alex Bregman	122	4th
Hits	Michael Brantley	179	8th
Singles	Michael Brantley	115	9th
Doubles (2B)	Michael Brantley	40	5th
Doubles (2B)	Yuli Gurriel	40	5th
Home runs	Alex Bregman	41	3rd
Home runs	George Springer	39	5th
Runs batted in (RBI)	Alex Bregman	112	5th
Runs batted in (RBI)	Yuli Gurriel	104	9th
Extra-base hits	Alex Bregman	80	5th
Total bases	Alex Bregman	328	5th
Bases on balls	Alex Bregman	119	1st
Times on base	Alex Bregman	282	1st
Offensive winning percentage	Alex Bregman	.774	2nd
Offensive winning percentage	George Springer	.713	4th
Hits by pitch	Robinson Chirinos	13	5th
Sacrifice flies	Josh Reddick	9	3rd
Sacrifice flies	Alex Bregman	8	4th
Sacrifice flies	Aledmys Díaz	6	10th
Sacrifice flies	Yuli Gurriel	6	10th
At bats per strikeout	Michael Brantley	8.7	3rd
At bats per strikeout	Yuli Gurriel	8.7	4th
At bats per strikeout	Josh Reddick	7.8	5th
At bats per strikeout	Alex Bregman	6.7	8th

==== Pitching ====
2019 AL pitching leaders
Category	Player	Figure	Rank
Wins Above Replacement (WAR)— pitching	Justin Verlander	7.4	3rd
Wins Above Replacement (WAR)— pitching	Gerrit Cole	6.6	4th
Earned run average (ERA)	Gerrit Cole	2.50	1st
Earned run average (ERA)	Justin Verlander	2.58	2nd
Earned run average (ERA)	Zack Greinke	2.93	9th (Note: MLB totals and ranking.)
Wins	Justin Verlander	21	1st
Wins	Gerrit Cole	20	2nd
Wins	Zack Greinke	18	4th
Win–loss percentage	Gerrit Cole	.800	2nd
Win–loss percentage	Zack Greinke	.783	4th
Win–loss percentage	Justin Verlander	.778	4th
Win–loss percentage	Wade Miley	.700	9th
Games started	Justin Verlander	34	1st
Games started	Gerrit Cole	33	5th
Games started	Zack Greinke	33	8th
Games started	Wade Miley	33	5th
Games finished (GF)	Roberto Osuna	56	1st
Quality starts	Gerrit Cole	26	1st
Quality starts	Justin Verlander	26	1st
Quality starts	Zack Greinke	24	3rd
Complete games	Justin Verlander	2	3rd
Shutouts	Justin Verlander	1	3rd
Saves	Roberto Osuna	38	1st
Holds	Ryan Pressly	31	1st
Holds	Will Harris	26	10th
Innings pitched	Justin Verlander	223	1st
Innings pitched	Gerrit Cole	212 1/3	3rd
Innings pitched	Zack Greinke	208 2/3	6th
Strikeouts (SO or K)	Gerrit Cole	326	1st
Strikeouts (SO or K)	Justin Verlander	300	2nd
Bases on balls allowed	Wade Miley	61	8th
Home runs allowed	Justin Verlander	36	2nd
Batters faced	Justin Verlander	847	6th
Batters faced	Gerrit Cole	817	8th
WHIP	Justin Verlander	.803	1st
WHIP	Gerrit Cole	.895	2nd
WHIP	Zack Greinke	.982	4th
Hits per nine innings (H/9)	Justin Verlander	5.529	1st
Hits per nine innings (H/9)	Gerrit Cole	6.019	2nd
BB/9	Zack Greinke	1,294	3rd
BB/9	Justin Verlander	1.695	2nd
BB/9	Gerrit Cole	2.035	4th
Strikeouts per nine innings (K/9)	Gerrit Cole	13.818	1st
Strikeouts per nine innings (K/9)	Justin Verlander	12.108	2nd
Strikeout-to-walk ratio (K/BB)	Justin Verlander	7.143	1st
Strikeout-to-walk ratio (K/BB)	Gerrit Cole	6.792	2nd
Strikeout-to-walk ratio (K/BB)	Zack Greinke	6.233	6th
Adjusted ERA+	Gerrit Cole	185	1st
Adjusted ERA+	Justin Verlander	179	2nd
Adjusted ERA+	Zack Greinke	154	7th
Adjusted ERA+	Wade Miley	116	10th
Fielding independent pitching (FIP)	Gerrit Cole	2.64	1st
Fielding independent pitching (FIP)	Zack Greinke	3.22	8th
Fielding independent pitching (FIP)	Justin Verlander	3.27	4th
• Sources:

=== Milestones ===
==== Major League debuts ====
Player—Appeared at position

- Yordan Alvarez, designated hitter
- José Urquidy, starting pitcher
- Abraham Toro, third baseman
Date and opponent

- June 9 vs Baltimore
- July 2 at Colorado
- August 22 vs Detroit
Box

Also:

== Roster ==
2019 Houston Astros
Roster
Pitchers: 66 Bryan Abreu; 61 Rogelio Armenteros; 29 Joe Biagini; 45 Gerrit Cole; 47 Chris Devenski; 21 Zack Greinke; 64 Reymin Guduan; 36 Will Harris; 39 Josh James; 29 Corbin Martin; 31 Collin McHugh; 20 Wade Miley; 54 Roberto Osuna; 41 Brad Peacock; 51 Cionel Pérez; 55 Ryan Pressly; 52 Brady Rodgers; 30 Héctor Rondón; 18 Aaron Sanchez; 38 Joe Smith; 67 Cy Sneed; 65 José Urquidy; 59 Framber Valdez; 35 Justin Verlander	Catchers: 28 Robinson Chirinos; 12 Martín Maldonado; 12 Max Stassi; 11 Garrett Stubbs; Infielders: 27 Jose Altuve; 2 Alex Bregman; 1 Carlos Correa; 16 Aledmys Díaz; 10 Yuli Gurriel; 18 Tony Kemp; 9 Jack Mayfield; 26 Myles Straw; 13 Abraham Toro; 13 Tyler White	Outfielders: 44 Yordan Alvarez; 23 Michael Brantley; 21 Derek Fisher; 6 Jake Marisnick; 22 Josh Reddick; 4 George Springer; 3 Kyle Tucker	Manager: 14 A. J. Hinch; Coaches: 85 Javier Bracamonte (bullpen catcher); 37 Alex Cintrón (hitting); 84 Michael Collins (catching); 19 Joe Espada (bench); 15 Don Kelly (first base); 48 Josh Miller (bullpen); 8 Gary Pettis (third base); 46 Troy Snitker (hitting); 56 Brent Strom (pitching)

== Minor league system ==
Level	Team	League	Manager
AAA	Round Rock Express	Pacific Coast League	
AA	Corpus Christi Hooks	Texas League	Omar López
A-Advanced	Fayetteville Woodpeckers	Carolina League	
A	Quad Cities River Bandits	Midwest League	
A-Short Season	Tri-City ValleyCats	New York–Penn League	
Rookie	GCL Astros	Gulf Coast League	
Rookie	DSL Astros	Dominican Summer League	

Awards

- Triple-A All-Star Team: Yordan Alvarez

== See also ==
- 300 strikeout club
- 3,000 strikeout club
- Game scores of 100 in a 9-inning MLB game
- List of Major League Baseball 100 win seasons
- List of Major League Baseball annual ERA leaders
- List of Major League Baseball annual saves leaders
- List of Major League Baseball annual strikeout leaders
- List of Major League Baseball annual wins leaders
- List of Major League Baseball career wins leaders
- List of Major League Baseball franchise postseason streaks
- List of Major League Baseball no-hitters
- List of Major League Baseball pitchers who have thrown an immaculate inning
- List of Major League Baseball titles leaders
