= Rogelio Armenteros =

Cuban baseball player (born 1994)

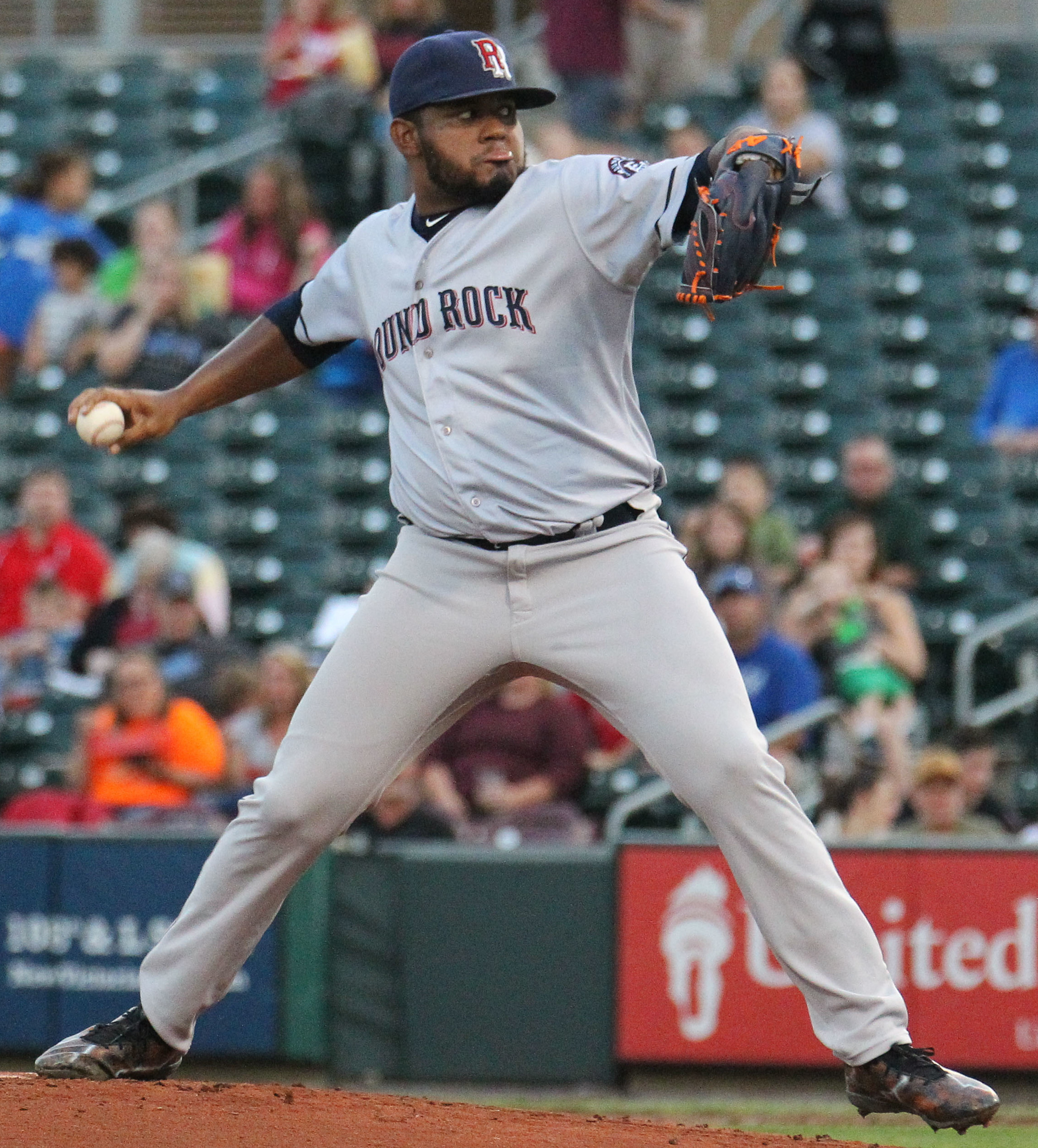
- Armenteros pitching for the Round Rock Express in 2019
- Pitcher
- Born: June 30, 1994 (age 31); Havana, Cuba
- Batted: Right Threw: Right

MLB debut
- June 14, 2019, for the Houston Astros

Last MLB appearance
- August 17, 2019, for the Houston Astros

MLB statistics
- Win–loss record: 1–1
- Earned run average: 4.00
- Strikeouts: 18
- Stats at Baseball Reference

Teams
- Houston Astros (2019)
Medals
Men's baseball
Representing Spain
European Championship
Gold medal – first place	2023 Czechia	Team
Representing Cuba
World Youth Baseball Championship
Silver medal – second place	2009 Taichung	Team

Rogelio Armenteros Peña (born June 30, 1994) is a Cuban former professional baseball pitcher. In 2014 he signed with the Houston Astros as an international free agent. He made his Major League Baseball (MLB) debut for Houston in 2019. Born in Cuba, he represents the Spain national baseball team in international competition.

== Career ==
=== Houston Astros ===
Armenteros played for Industriales of the Cuban National Series in 2011/2012. In September 2014, he signed with the Houston Astros as an international free agent.

Armenteros made his professional debut 2015 with the Tri-City ValleyCats and was later promoted to the Quad Cities River Bandits; in 61 total innings pitched between both teams, he posted a 3–2 record and 3.69 ERA. In 2016, he pitched for Quad Cities, Lancaster JetHawks and Corpus Christi Hooks, pitching to a combined 8–6 record and 3.53 ERA in 26 games (22 starts). After the season he pitched in the Arizona Fall League. Armenteros started 2017 with Corpus Christi, and after going 2–3 with a 1.93 ERA in 14 games, was promoted to the Fresno Grizzlies, where he finished the season with an 8–1 record and 2.16 ERA in 24 total games (20 total starts) between both teams. In 2018, he returned to Fresno, going 8–1 with a 3.74 ERA in 22 games (21 starts).

The Astros added Armenteros to their 40-man roster after the 2018 season. He began 2019 with the Round Rock Express. He was promoted to the Major Leagues on June 14, 2019. On March 14, 2020, Armenteros underwent surgery to remove bone spurs from his right elbow. However, the injury persisted and as a result Armenteros spent the 2020 season on the injured list without making an appearance for the Astros.

=== Arizona Diamondbacks ===
On November 20, 2020, Armenteros was claimed off waivers by the Arizona Diamondbacks.

=== Washington Nationals ===
On December 7, 2020, Armenteros was claimed off waivers by the Washington Nationals. After struggling to a 5.83 ERA in 7 games for the Triple-A Rochester Red Wings, Armenteros was designated for assignment on June 15, 2021. He was outrighted on June 18. The Nationals released Armenteros from his minor league contract on August 30.

=== Diablos Rojos del México ===
On January 17, 2022, Armenteros signed with the Diablos Rojos del México of the Mexican League. He made two scoreless appearances for México, recording six strikeouts over 3 2/3 innings pitched.

=== Guerreros de Oaxaca ===
On May 10, 2022, Armenteros was traded to the Guerreros de Oaxaca of the Mexican League. In 3 games (2 starts) for Oaxaca, he posted an 0–1 record and 7.94 ERA with 11 strikeouts over 11 1/3 innings pitched. Armenteros was released by the Guerreros on May 22.

== International career ==
Armenteros was selected to represent Spain at the 2023 World Baseball Classic qualification.
