= José Suárez =

José Suárez may refer to:

- José Suárez Carreño (1915–2002), Spanish writer
- José Suárez Fanjul (1916–2006), Chilean politician
- José Suárez (actor) (1919–1981), Spanish film actor
- José Suárez (pitcher/outfielder) (1891–?), Cuban baseball player in the Negro leagues
- José Suárez (baseball, born 1998), Venezuelan Major League Baseball player
- José Suárez (broadcaster) (1970–2026), American broadcaster
- José A. Suarez (born 1965/1966), American judge
- José David Suárez (1953–2019), Cuban volleyball player
