= 1999 Houston Astros season =

38th season in Major League Baseball for the Houston Astros

1999 Houston Astros
- National League Central champions
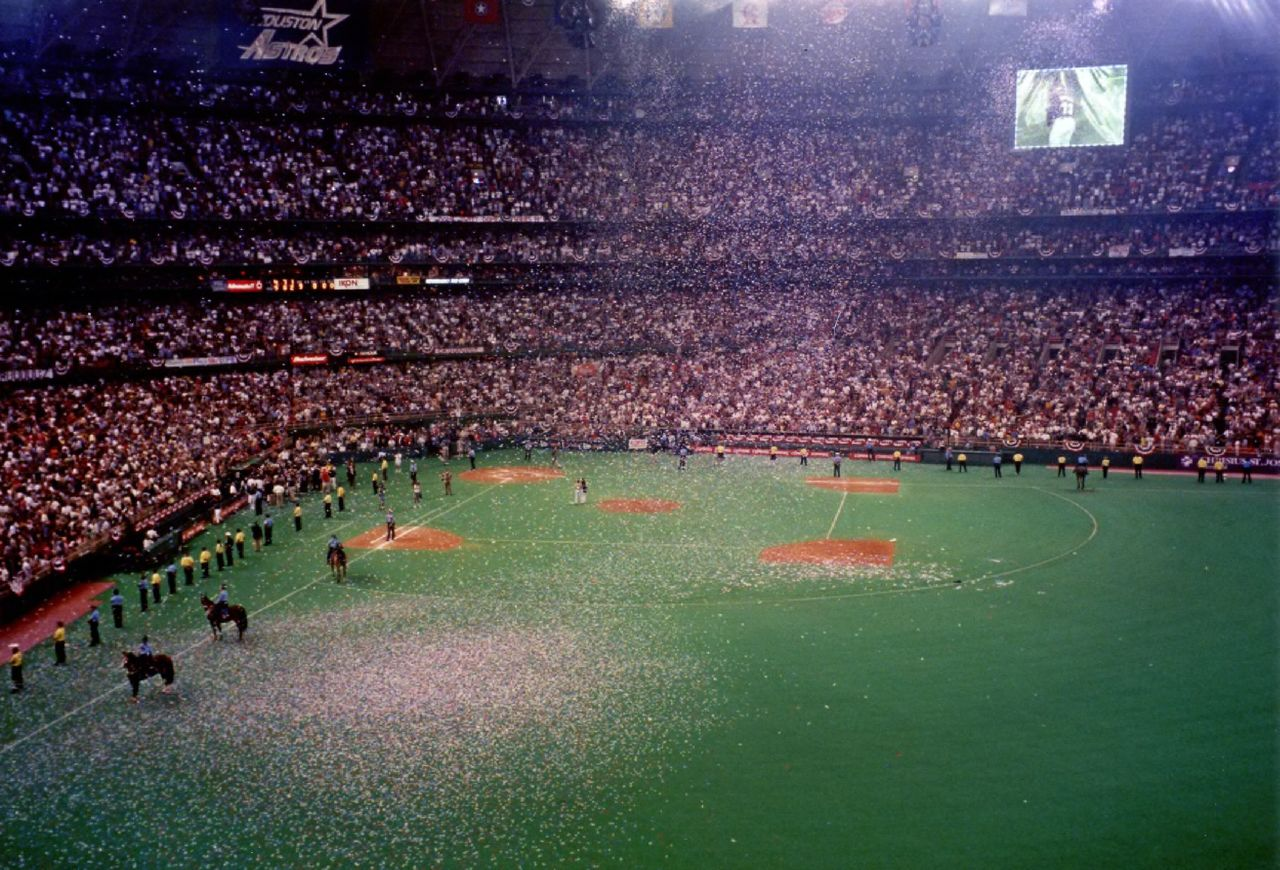
- Final Astros regular season game in the Astrodome on October 3, 1999
- League: National League
- Division: Central
- Ballpark: Astrodome
- City: Houston, Texas
- Record: 97–65 (.599)
- Divisional place: 1st
- Owners: Drayton McLane, Jr.
- General managers: Gerry Hunsicker
- Managers: Larry Dierker, Matt Galante
- Television: KNWS-TV; Fox Sports Southwest (Bill Brown, Jim Deshaies)
- Radio: KTRH (Milo Hamilton, Alan Ashby); KXYZ (Francisco Ernesto Ruiz, Alex Treviño)

The 1999 Houston Astros season was the 38th season for the Major League Baseball (MLB) franchise located in Houston, Texas, their 35th as the Astros, 38th in the National League (NL), sixth in the NL Central division, and 35th and final season at The Astrodome. The Astros entered the season as two-time defending NL Central champions with a 102–60 record, setting a then-club record for wins, as well their first-ever 100-win season. However, the Astros' season ended in a 3-games-to-1 defeat by the San Diego Padres in the National League Division Series (NLDS), also the NL pennant winners.

On April 6, pitcher Shane Reynolds made his fourth consecutive Opening Day start for the Astros, who hosted the Chicago Cubs and won, 4–2. In the amateur draft, the Astros' first round selection was outfielder Mike Rosamond at 42nd overall.

Four Astros represented the club, playing for the National League at the MLB All-Star Game: first baseman Jeff Bagwell, (Note: Played in the All-Star Game as the starting designated hitter.) and pitchers Mike Hampton, José Lima, and Billy Wagner. This was the fourth All-Star appearance for Bagwell, and first for each of Hampton, Lima and Wagner. Former pitcher Nolan Ryan was inducted into the Baseball Hall of Fame. Ryan spent nine of his 27 MLB seasons with Houston, from 1980 to 1988. Following the season, Ryan was also announced as a selectee to the MLB All-Century Team.

Bagwell tied the Major League record by producing a fourth successive campaigns of each of 100 runs scored, 30 doubles, 30 home runs, 100 runs batted in (RBI) and 100 base on balls (BB), equaling Lou Gehrig. With 30 stolen bases, Bagwell also entered the 30–30 club for the second time in his career.

The Astros won their third consecutive NL Central division title on October 3, the final day of playing regular season games in The Astrodome before a sellout crowd. Fans broke the franchise attendance record for a second consecutive season at over 2.7 million. For the first time in franchise history, Houston claimed three consecutive division titles while qualifying for the playoffs in three straight seasons. This was the Astros' sixth division title and sixth playoff appearance overall. However, their campaign ended in a 3-games-to-1 defeat by the Atlanta Braves in that year's NLDS. It was Houston's third consecutive NLDS loss, and the second in three seasons to Atlanta, who ended their season as the NL pennant winners.

Following the season, Hampton, the NL leader in wins (22) and third-place finisher in earned run average (2.90 ERA), was recognized with the Players Choice Award for NL Outstanding Pitcher and as The Sporting News NL Pitcher of the Year, (Note: From its inception in 1944 until 2012, The Sporting News recognized one pitcher each from the NL and the American League (AL) for this award. Beginning in 2013, the award was redesignated to recognize one starting pitcher and relief pitcher from each league.) Wagner won the Rolaids Relief Man Award, and Bagwell and Hampton won Silver Slugger Awards.

The Astros relocated the following season to Enron Field, later rebranded as Minute Maid Park, also in downtown Houston.

== Offseason ==
The Astros concluded the 1998 campaign as National League (NL) Central division champions with a 102–60 (.630) record, the first 100-win season in franchise history. It was their second consecutive division title and fifth overall in franchise history. The Astros' campaign ended in a three-games-to-one defeat by the San Diego Padres in the best-of-five National League Division Series (NLDS). The Astros established a then-club record with 166 home runs. Craig Biggio became the first, and so far only, Major Leaguer to amass 200 hits, 50 doubles, 20 home runs, and 50 stolen bases all within the same season. (Note: For single seasons, in the regular season, requiring doubles ≥ 50 and home runs ≥ 20 and stolen bases ≥ 50 and hits ≥ 200, sorted by ascending season.) Randy Johnson became the seventh pitcher since 1900 to amass multiple 300-strikeout seasons.

Outfielder Moisés Alou missed the entire 1999 campaign due to a knee injury.

- November 17, 1998: Ken Caminiti was signed as a free agent by the Astros.
- December 9, 1999: Signed Craig Biggio to a 4-year extension for $28 million.
- January 19, 1999: Ryan Thompson was signed as a free agent by the Astros.
- January 21, 1999: Alex Diaz was signed as a free agent by the Astros.

== Regular season ==
=== New stadium ===
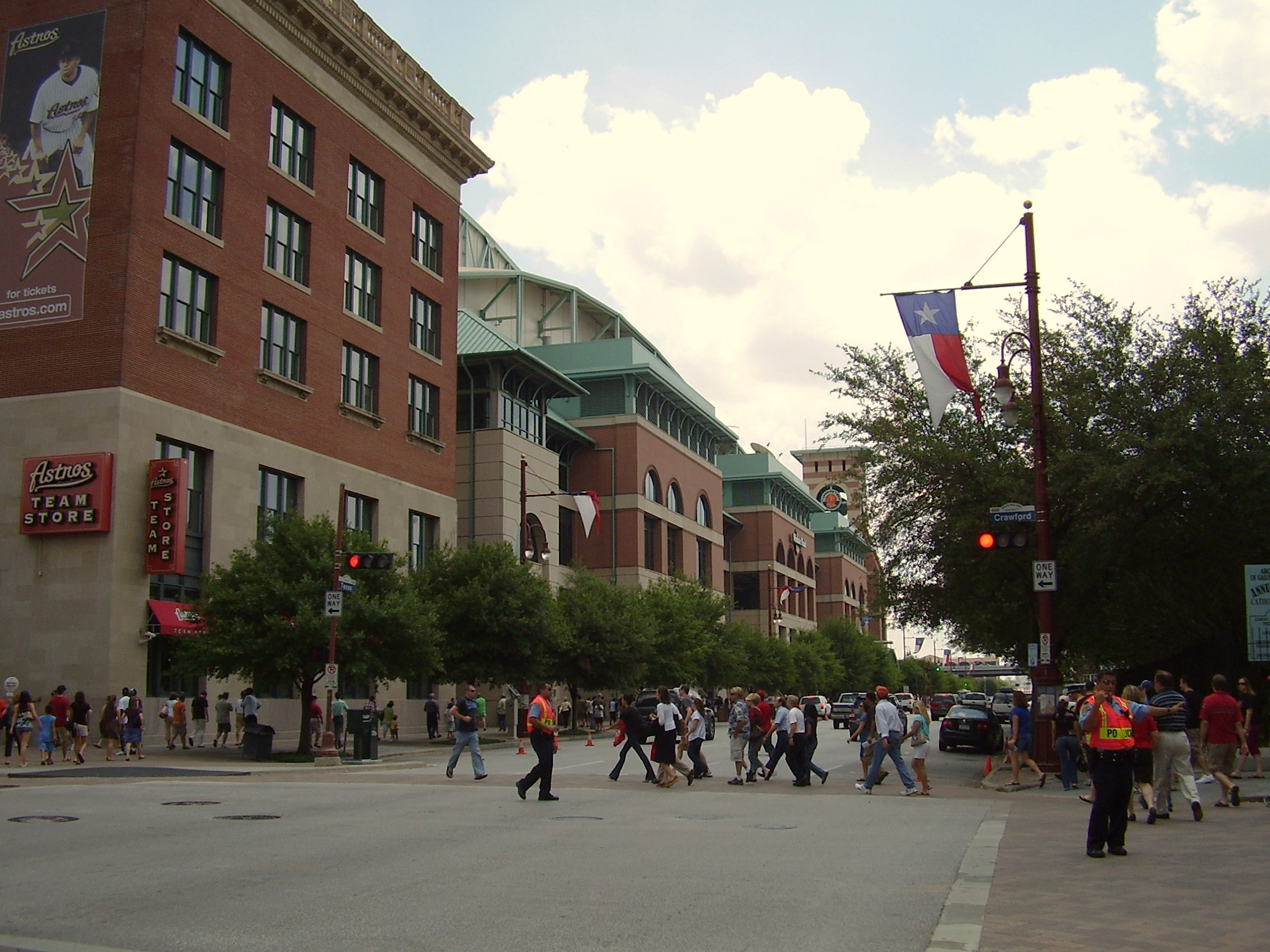
Exterior of Minute Maid Park

In 1999, the Astros played their final season in the Astrodome as their new stadium was being prepared for play to begin in the 2000 season. The ballpark was first named as Enron Field on April 9, 1999, with naming rights sold to the Houston energy and financial trading company in a 30-year, $100 million deal. Astros management faced a public relations nightmare when the energy corporation went bankrupt in the midst of one of the biggest corporate scandals in American history in 2001, and they bought back the remainder of Enron's thirty years of naming rights for $2.1 million, renaming the ballpark as Astros Field on February 7, 2002. The field was unofficially known as "The Field Formerly Known As Enron" by fans and critics alike, in the wake of the Enron scandal. On June 5, 2002, Houston-based Minute Maid, the fruit-juice subsidiary of Coca-Cola, acquired the naming rights to the stadium for 28 years at a price exceeding $100 million.

Based on its downtown location next to the old Union Station buildings, one of the suggested names (and nicknames) is the Ballpark at Union Station, or the BUS. During its days as Enron Field, it was also dubbed "Ten-Run" or "Home Run" Field due to its cozy left-field dimensions. In keeping with this theme while paying homage to its current sponsor, the nickname "The Juice Box" is colloquially used today.

=== Summary ===
==== April ====
Opening Day starting lineup
| Uniform | Player | Position |
|---|---|---|
| 7 | Craig Biggio | Second baseman |
| 14 | Derek Bell | Right fielder |
| 5 | Jeff Bagwell | First baseman |
| 11 | Ken Caminiti | Third baseman |
| 3 | Carl Everett | Center fielder |
| 15 | Richard Hidalgo | Left fielder |
| 20 | Tony Eusebio | Catcher |
| 12 | Ricky Gutiérrez | Shortstop |
| 37 | Shane Reynolds | Pitcher |
Venue: Astrodome • Final: Houston 4, Chicago 2 Sources:

The Astros hosted the Chicago Cubs for Opening Day, April 6. As part of the festivities to commemorate the final Opening Day at the Astrodome, former astronaut Neil Armstrong spun the ceremonial first pitch. (Note: Armstrong had been one of 24 astronauts on hand for the inaugural regular-season contest at the Astrodome.) This was also Chicago's first Opening Day in Houston since the Colt .45s' franchise Inauguration Day, April 10, 1962, during which the Colts triumphed, 11–2. Armstrong was flanked by 70 astronauts on either side of the infield, and delivered the pitch to Craig Biggio. Shane Reynolds made his fourth consecutive Opening Day start opposite the Cubs' Steve Trachsel. In the second inning, Mark Grace homered off Reynolds for his first of three hits and early 1–0 Cubs' lead. In the bottom of the inning, Tony Eusebio doubled and scored on a single by Reynolds. In the bottom of the fourth inning, Carl Everett and Richard Hidalgo went deep to give the Astros a 3–2 lead. In the fifth, Everett lined a single to plate Jeff Bagwell for a 4–2 Astros lead and the final tally of the contest. Reynolds breezed through six innings on 75 pitches, whiffing seven. Scott Elarton relieved and spun two shutout frames. Billy Wagner fanned Benito Santiago and José Hernández to polish off the triumph for the save and the win for Reynolds. This defeat dropped the Cubs' all-time record at the Astrodome to 81–134 (.377).

On the 35th and final anniversary of the opening of the Astrodome, April 9, 1965, Tim Bogar singled home Richard Hidalgo for the winning run to defeat the Milwaukee Brewers, 3–2. Starting pitcher Sean Bergman homered but it was Scott Elarton who notched the victory in relief.

On April 11, Craig Biggio scored his 1,000th run along with two hits to lead a 5–2 win over the Brewers. Shane Reynolds was the winning pitcher.

On April 21, Jeff Bagwell hit three home runs in a 10–3 win against the Chicago Cubs at Wrigley Field, his second career three-home run game. The second home run surpassed Jimmy Wynn as the Astros' all-time home run leader at 224, while his six runs batted in (RBI) tied a career-high. Bagwell joined Glenn Davis as Astros with multiple three-home run games (September 10, 1987, and June 1, 1990). (Note: Bagwell's first 3-homer game since June 24, 1994, his next occurred on June 9, 1999.)

==== Run-scoring record at the Astrodome ====
Houston staged an offensive onslaught on May 11 in a record-breaking performance, routing the Pittsburgh Pirates 19–8 at the Astrodome. The 19 runs—all arriving without the benefit of a home run—broke a club record, while the lineup combined to scorch 10 doubles, also a club record. Each of Jeff Bagwell, Richard Hidalgo and Paul Bako doubled twice. Carl Everett collected 5 RBI, and Bagwell and Ken Caminiti both added four. Hence, as this was the final season of baseball at the Astrodome, these feats would remain permanent team records at the venue.

The 19 runs matched a 1995 explosion against the Chicago Cubs for the club record for runs, which stood until the 2015 season. Bagwell reached base five times via the two doubles and drawing three bases on balls while scoring four times. Sean Bergman was the winning pitcher after having allowing 11 hits and 6 runs over 5 innings. The doubles tally stood as a club until another banner offensive performance on September 8, 2019, when Houston collected 11 doubles en route to defeating the Seattle Mariners, 21–1. Everett tied his career high in RBI.

==== Rest of May ====
On May 14, Carl Everett tied his career high with four hits.

During a 10–5 win over the San Francisco Giants on May 15, second baseman Craig Biggio powered a 4-for-4 performance, including a three-run home run. Bagwell also slugged a three-run home run in the effort.

Everett manufactured 5 successive multi-hit contests and at least one RBI prior to being named NL Player of the Week on May 16. Houston won all five contests as Everett batted .609 (14-for-23), scoring seven runs, and driving in eight.

==== June—July ====
Bagwell connected for another three-home run game on June 9 against the Chicago White Sox. He was also a grand slam short of hitting for the "home run cycle," with a solo home run, a three-run home run, and a two-run home run, respectively. The two three-home run games made him the only player to accomplish this feat at two different stadiums in Chicago in the same season. Hence, Bagwell became the first Astro with three such games, breaking a tie with Glenn Davis. (Note: The subsequent Astro to slug a three-home run game was Vinny Castilla on July 28, 2001.)

On June 13, manager Larry Dierker collapsed in the dugout mid-game versus the San Diego Padres due to a grand mal seizure. He was hospitalized and required brain surgery, but recovered well to miss just 27 games. The game was suspended with Houston leading, 4–0. During the bottom of the sixth inning, Derek Bell crushed the only grand slam of his career to give Houston the lead. In spite of losing Dierker, two other coaches to lengthy absences, and 14 players to the disabled list (DL), the Astros kept the competitive momentum going throughout the season.

Astros general manager Gerry Hunsicker promoted bench coach Matt Galante to serve as interim manager of the Astros in Dierker's stead. Galante, who had been in the organization since 1980 and was bench coach for one year, led the team to a performance result of 13–14 (.481). It was during this time that the team absorbed the absences of other coaching staff members on medical leave. First base coach José Cruz was on leave after an irregular heart beat. Hitting coach Tommy McCraw underwent treatment for prostate cancer.

==== MLB All-Star Game ====
- Home Run Derby: Jeff Bagwell—Round 1: 5 / Round 2: 1 / Total: 6 (4th place) • Winner: Ken Griffey Jr. (SEA)—Total:16

Four Astros selected to fortify the National League roster at the MLB All-Star Game, hosted at Fenway Park in Boston. It was the fourth selection for Bagwell, who became the first Astro to make the starting lineup as the designated hitter, and first for each of the pitchers Mike Hampton, José Lima, and Billy Wagner. Bagwell collected a single off David Cone in three at bats, while Lima (1 inning pitched), Hampton (2/3), and Wagner (2/3) each tossed a scoreless outing. However, the American League (AL) triumphed, 4–1.

==== July, post-All-Star break ====
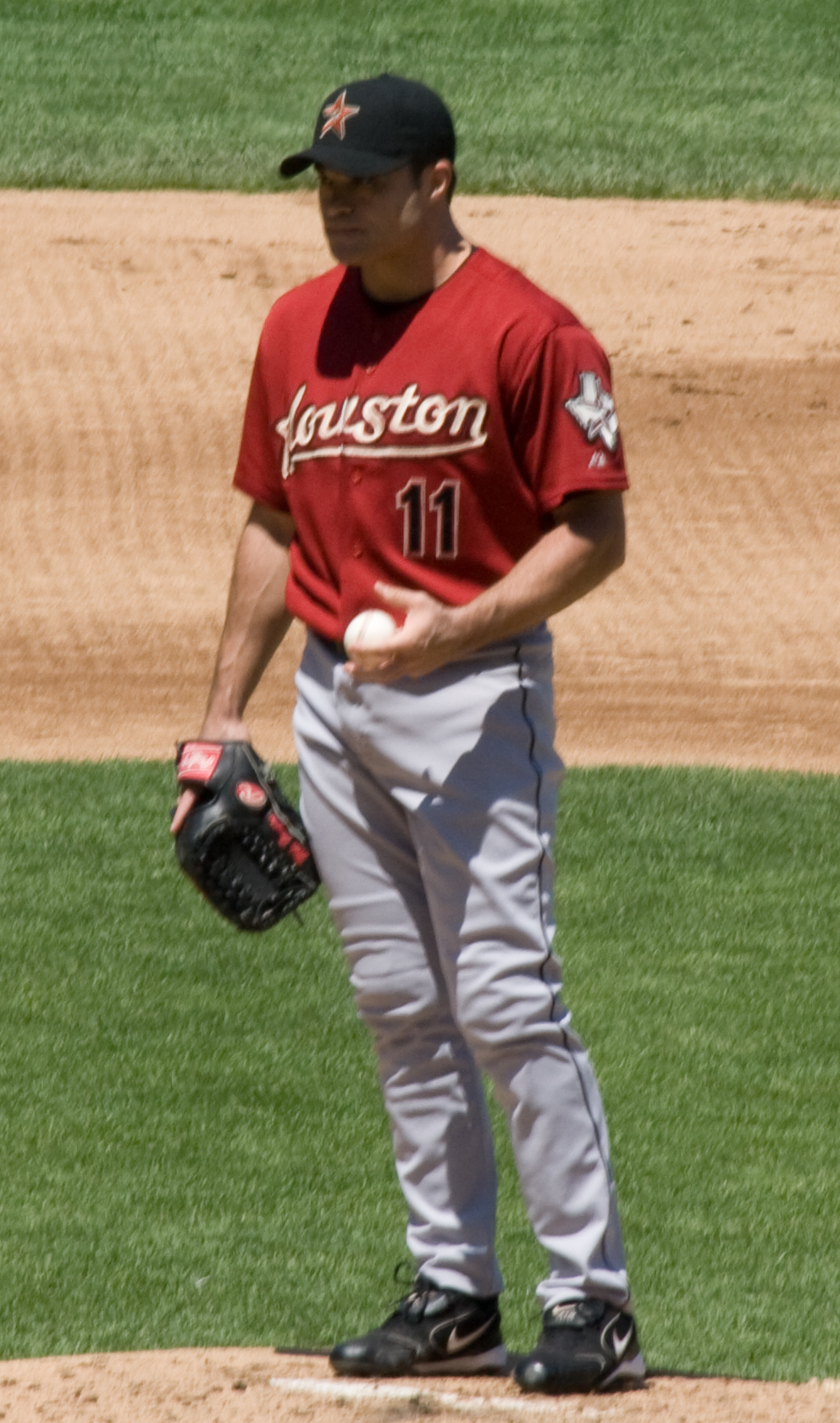
Twenty-two-game winner Mike Hampton pitching for the Astros during the 2009 season.

On July 15, Shane Reynolds tossed an immaculate first inning, whiffing Juan Encarnación, Brad Ausmus, and Bobby Higginson. Reynolds' was the fifth in club history, and signaled the third successive campaign that an Astros hurler had done so, trailing Randy Johnson by less than one year (September 2, 1998). During the bottom half of the first, Tigers starter Dave Mlicki required just four pitches to face four batters: he yielded a leadoff single to Craig Biggio, then retired Bill Spiers on a fly ball, and Jeff Bagwell and Carl Everett each by ground outs.

Lance Berkman made his major league debut on July 16, entering during the bottom of the seventh as a pinch hitter for starting pitcher Scott Elarton. Southpaw Justin Thompson induced Berkman to ground out into a double play with the score tied, 1–1. However, Craig Biggio delivered the walk-off single that plated Glen Barker for a 2–1 triumph over the Detroit Tigers.

On July 23, the Astros and Padres resumed the contest interrupted by Dierker's seizure. Shane Reynolds (8–6) allowed just an unearned run over eight innings prior to reliever Billy Wagner taking over, who surrendered a pair of home runs to Phil Nevin and Rubén Rivera. However, the Astros held on for a 4–3 win. During the originally schedule contest of July 23, Matt Mieske's clutch grand slam (6th home run) during the Astros' final at bat in the bottom of the eighth gave the home team a 7–3 lead. Derek Bell (11) and Paul Bako (2) also homered for Houston. Mike Hampton (13–3) earned a complete game victory.

Bagwell crushed his second career grand slam on July 28, capping a 16–8 thrashing of the Colorado Rockies at Coors Field. Bagwell's victim was Mike Porzio in the top of seventh. However, during an all-round hit parade, Houston piled on 21 hits to Colorado's 18. Derek Bell had a four-hit game for Houston, Tony Eusebio logged three with a double, Biggio doubled, and both Russ Johnson and Daryle Ward went deep. Moreover, starter Mike Hampton (14–3), in spite of ceding 5 runs on 13 hits to the Rockies, stroked his third triple among three hits and two RBI at the plate, helping to pave his own way to victory. Mercifully, games are concluded when the scored is not tied after nine innings. Ignited by five runs in the fourth, the Astros tallied in each of the final six innings, while the Rockies scored in each of the final five frames.

On July 31, Berkman launched his first two major league home runs during an 8–5 triumph over San Diego at Qualcomm Stadium. The premier shot, on an Andy Ashby offering, broke a scoreless tie in the top of the fourth. Berkman's second was off Dan Miceli in the seventh. Berkman collected three hits and a stolen base. Bagwell also homered twice.

==== August—October ====
To cap an extra inning marathon on August 20, Ken Caminiti crushed his second homer of the game, tipping the final score to Houston, 6–4, in the 16th over the Florida Marlins. The contest featured an NL-record 16 bases on balls coaxed by the Astros hitters, while they also whiffed 21 times. Meanwhile, Bagwell drew a major-league-record six free passes, including twice intentionally.

During the August 31 contest, Ken Caminiti launched the final grand slam hit at the Astrodome, with Houston hosting the New York Mets. The big knock proved crucial, as all the scoring transpired after the sixth inning. Caminiti's two out error in the top of the eighth injected new life into the Mets, and John Olerud leveraged the opportunity by homering to tie the game, 2–2. In the bottom of the eighth, Turk Wendell (3–2) issued the intentional walk to Bagwell to face Caminiti instead, who launched the grand slam to put the Astros ahead, 6–2. Meanwhile, Lima (18–7) tossed eight smooth innings, with just two unearned runs allowed, while Wagner closed out the contest with a clean ninth. Caminiti's slam implemented the only season in which the home team would hit as many as four at the Astrodome, and was the third of his career at the stadium. Caminiti became the second player to hit three grand slams at the Astrodome, joining Doug Rader on May 16, 1971.

On September 19, Billy Wagner converted his 37th save, breaking the single-season franchise mark held by Doug Jones (1992). (Note: Tied (2001), and surpassed (2003), by Wagner himself. Criteria: For single seasons, from 1962 to 2008, playing for HOU, in the regular season, requiring saves ≥ 30, sorted by ascending season.) Wagner closed out 4–3 triumph over the St. Louis Cardinals. Starter Chris Holt (5–13) earned the win with a quality start (6 innings, 3 earned runs), despite Mark McGwire taking him deep for home runs 58 and 59. Craig Biggio collected three hits, including his 55th double and 15th home run. Jeff Bagwell also crushed his 42nd home run while obtained his 120th RBI.

During a Friday night contest on September 24 at Milwaukee County Stadium, Bill Spiers, stationed in right field, endured an ambush by a fan who had crawled down the adjacent wall. On a dare from his peers, the assailant, a 23-year-old Berley Visgar tackled Spiers from behind, toppling him, and delivered a bloody nose, a welt under the left eye and induced whiplash. Astros starting pitcher Mike Hampton immediately saw what was unfolding and sprinted to his right fielder's aid—arriving before anyone else—and pummeled Visgar with several kicks before being separated by teammates and Milwaukee Brewers players. (Note: Per an online obituary, Visgar died in 2018 at age 46.)

On October 2, Lima and Wagner combined to hurl the final shutout pitched at the Astrodome.

==== Final regular-season game at the Astrodome ====
The Astros won their final regular-season contest at the Astrodome on October 3, 9–4 over the Los Angeles Dodgers, while also clinching a third consecutive National League Central division title in record-setting fashion and with style. Hampton became the first 22-game winner in club history, while Biggio extended his club-record 56th double. Daryle Ward also doubled, driving in runs with the bases loaded in the first inning to begin the scoring. Tony Eusebio secured the final regular-season putout at the Astrodome.

Following the game, members of the 1965 club appeared and were honored along with an All-Time Astros Team before a jubilant crowd. The first time in franchise history the Astros had won three consecutive division titles, they made history before yet another sellout crowd. In a season where standing-room only access became more commonplace than ever, Astros fans turned in yet another record-setting year of attendance, with 2.7 million, shattering the previous record set just the year prior, at 2.45 million.

==== Performance overview ====
Incorporating the 102-win campaign of the year prior, these Astros editions matched the 1979 (89 wins) and 1980 (93) outfits as the second period in franchise annals in which Houston won 89 or more contests successively.

Having won a third division title—all consecutively—Dierker became the first manager to guide his rosters to these feats for the Astros, surpassing Bill Virdon (1980 and 1981 second-half division winner). The franchise record of three successive division titles was matched when the 2017, 2018, and 2019 squads each claimed an American League (AL) West title, and remained as the franchise record until Houston captured four successive AL West titles from 2021 to 2024. (Note: As part of the agreement to the sale of the club to Jim Crane in 2011, the Astros were reassigned to compete in the American League commencing with the 2013 season.)

This Astros team established club records for home runs with 168 (surpassed 166 the previous season), 728 bases on balls (699 in 1969), and scored 823 runs which ranked second to the 1998 team (856). This iteration of the Astros sealed a final club record by hitting four grand slams in the Astrodome in one season, surpassing three hit each in 1970, 1985, 1989, and 1995.

The accomplishments of the club two decades later and beyond notwithstanding, Dierker maintained a share of the club record as manager to lead his club to division titles—he was equaled by A. J. Hinch, who guided the 2017–2019 clubs, and Dusty Baker, leader of the 2021–2023 editions. In 2024, Joe Espada took over for Baker.

Jeff Bagwell became the first major leaguer to attain each of 100 runs scored, 30 doubles, 30 home runs, 100 runs batted in (RBI), 100 base on balls (BB), and 30 stolen bases within the same season. (Note: As of 2026, Bagwell was still the only player to reach each of these milestones. Criteria: Number of seasons player meets criteria, in the regular season, requiring Doubles ≥ 30 and Home Runs ≥ 40 and Stolen Bases ≥ 30 and Runs Batted In ≥ 100 and Batting Average ≥ .300 and Runs ≥ 100 and Bases on Balls ≥ 100, sorted by descending instances.) He also recorded the fourth of six successive campaigns in which he reached at least 100 runs scored, 30 doubles, 30 home runs, 100 RBI) and 100 BB, through 2001. This streak tied Lou Gehrig in 1999 for the all-time record of four consecutive seasons with each of the aforementioned milestones. (Note: Just four other players had produced six or more total seasons meeting each of the criteria: Lou Gehrig (8); and Babe Ruth, Ted Williams, and Barry Bonds (6 each). Gehrig produced the four consecutive from 1929 to 1932. Filtered for: Number of seasons player meets criteria, in the regular season: Requiring runs ≥ 100, doubles ≥ 30, home runs ≥ 30, runs batted in ≥ 100 and bases on balls ≥ 100, sorted by descending instances.) Bagwell, along with Chipper Jones, became the 13th and 14th major leagues to bat .300, score 100 runs, hit 30 doubles, 40 home runs, 100 RBI, and draw 100 walks, each within the same season. (Note: The next Astro to accomplish these benchmarks was Yordan Alvarez in 2026. Criteria: Number of seasons player meets criteria, in the regular season, requiring Doubles ≥ 30 and Home Runs ≥ 40 and Runs Batted In ≥ 100 and Batting Average ≥ .300 and Runs ≥ 100 and Bases on Balls ≥ 100, sorted by descending instances.) Further, having hit 42 home runs and stolen 30 bases, Bagwell repeated as an entrant in the 30 home runs—30 stolen bases club (also in 1997), and he was the first Astro to accomplish such an achievement even once. Bagwell drew 149 bases on balls to eclipse the franchise record of 148 sustained by Jimmy Wynn in 1969. The 149 free passes led the major leagues, as well as Bagwell's 331 times on base, 143 runs scored and power–speed number of 35.0.

Carl Everett, who led the Astros with a .325 batting average, joined Bagwell in reaching the 25 home runs and 25 stolen bases. Bagwell and Everett became the only teammate duo in Major League history to hit a .900 on-base plus slugging (OPS) with 25 home runs and 25 stolen bases. (Note: Number of players that meet criteria in a season for a team, in the regular season, requiring home runs ≥ 25 and on-base plus slugging ≥ .900 and stolen bases ≥ 25, sorted by descending instances.) Moreover, they became just the second teammate duo to bat .300 with 25 home runs and 25 stolen bases, following the 1996 Colorado Rockies (Ellis Burks and Dante Bichette). (Note: Number of players that meet criteria in a season for a team, in the regular season, requiring batting average ≥ .300 and home runs ≥ 25 and stolen bases ≥ 25, sorted by descending instances.)

Craig Biggio became the twelfth Major Leaguer and first since George Kell (Detroit Tigers) in 1950 to assemble at least 56 doubles, and first National Leaguer since Joe Medwick (1936 and 1937). (Note: For single seasons, in the regular season, requiring doubles ≥ 56, sorted by ascending season.) In addition to entrenching the club record with 56 doubles, Biggio became the third Astro to headline the National League, and his club-record third time doing so, previously in 1994 and 1998. The seventh occasion by an Astros hitter, those preceding Biggio included Rusty Staub (1967), César Cedeño (twice, 1971 and 1972), and Bagwell (1996).

Also for the first time in franchise history, with Hampton (22 wins) and Lima (21), the Astros sported a 20 game-winner duo, the sixth and seventh pitchers in franchise history to win 20 in a season. The third in a succession of Astros hurlers who led the league the in wins over decennial intervals, Hampton joined Niekro in 1979 and Scott in 1989 (20). Dierker, who became the Astros' first-ever 20-game winning pitcher in 1969, ranked fifth in the league that season.

Hampton was recognized with The Sporting News NL Pitcher of the Year Award, the third Astro to receive this honor, following Joe Niekro in 1979 and Mike Scott in 1986. Hampton also became the first Astros moundman to win the Players Choice Award for NL Outstanding Pitcher.

Bagwell was awarded his third career Silver Slugger Award, extending his club record for first baseman. Meanwhile Hampton, who also claimed a Silver Slugger, became the first in club history to win among pitchers. It was the third successive campaign that Houston had boasted at least two Silver Sluggers, and fourth overall (1983).

Closer Billy Wagner led National League relivers with a 1.57 earned run average (ERA, minimum 50 innings), converted 39 saves to establish a then-club record (surpassing 36 saves converted by Doug Jones in 1992), and was recognized with the NL Rolaids Relief Man Award. Wagner's ERA was the then-third-lowest in Colt .45s/Astros club history (minimum 50 innings), trailing Don McMahon in 1962 (1.53) and Larry Andersen in 1989 (1.54). (Note: In 2019, Will Harris yielded a 1.50 ERA to break McMahon's record.) Wagner also fanned 124 batters, surpassing his own club record of 106 in 1997 for Houston relivers, and remaining so until 2001, when Octavio Dotel whiffed 145. Wagner became Houston's first hurler be named with an annual reliever award since Jones, when, also in 1992, he received The Sporting News NL Fireman of the Year honors.

=== League standings ===
==== National League Central ====
NL Central
| Team | W | L | Pct. | GB | Home | Road |
|---|---|---|---|---|---|---|
| Houston Astros | 97 | 65 | .599 | — | 50‍–‍32 | 47‍–‍33 |
| Cincinnati Reds | 96 | 67 | .589 | 1½ | 45‍–‍37 | 51‍–‍30 |
| Pittsburgh Pirates | 78 | 83 | .484 | 18½ | 45‍–‍36 | 33‍–‍47 |
| St. Louis Cardinals | 75 | 86 | .466 | 21½ | 38‍–‍42 | 37‍–‍44 |
| Milwaukee Brewers | 74 | 87 | .460 | 22½ | 32‍–‍48 | 42‍–‍39 |
| Chicago Cubs | 67 | 95 | .414 | 30 | 34‍–‍47 | 33‍–‍48 |

==== Record versus opponents ====
National League

1999 National League record Source: MLB Standings Grid – 1999
| Team | AZ | ATL | CHC | CIN | COL | FLA | HOU | LAD | MIL | MON | NYM | PHI | PIT | SD | SF | STL | AL |
|---|---|---|---|---|---|---|---|---|---|---|---|---|---|---|---|---|---|
| Arizona | — | 4–5 | 7–2 | 1–8 | 6–7 | 8–1 | 5–4 | 7–6 | 5–4 | 6–3 | 7–2 | 8–1 | 5–2 | 11–2 | 9–3 | 4–4 | 7–8 |
| Atlanta | 5–4 | — | 2–5 | 8–1 | 5–4 | 9–4 | 6–1 | 5–4 | 5–2 | 9–4 | 9–3 | 8–5 | 6–3 | 5–4 | 4–5 | 8–1 | 9–9 |
| Chicago | 2–7 | 5–2 | — | 5–8 | 4–5 | 6–3 | 3–9 | 2–7 | 6–6 | 2–5 | 3–6 | 2–7 | 7–6 | 6–3 | 1–7 | 7–5 | 6–9 |
| Cincinnati | 8–1 | 1–8 | 8–5 | — | 7–2 | 6–1 | 9–4 | 4–3 | 6–6 | 4–3 | 5–5 | 6–3 | 7–6 | 6–3 | 4–5 | 8–4 | 7–8 |
| Colorado | 7–6 | 4–5 | 5–4 | 2–7 | — | 5–4 | 2–6 | 8–5 | 6–3 | 6–3 | 4–5 | 5–4 | 2–7 | 4–9 | 4–9 | 4–5 | 4–8 |
| Florida | 1–8 | 4–9 | 3–6 | 1–6 | 4–5 | — | 2–7 | 7–2 | 5–4 | 8–4 | 3–10 | 2–11 | 3–4 | 3–6 | 4–5 | 3–4 | 11–7 |
| Houston | 4–5 | 1–6 | 9–3 | 4–9 | 6–2 | 7–2 | — | 6–3 | 8–5 | 7–2 | 4–5 | 6–1 | 5–7 | 8–1 | 5–4 | 5–7 | 12–3 |
| Los Angeles | 6–7 | 4–5 | 7–2 | 3–4 | 5–8 | 2–7 | 3–6 | — | 7–2 | 5–4 | 4–4 | 6–3 | 3–6 | 3–9 | 8–5 | 3–6 | 8–7 |
| Milwaukee | 4–5 | 2–5 | 6–6 | 6–6 | 3–6 | 4–5 | 5–8 | 2–7 | — | 5–4 | 2–5 | 5–4 | 8–4 | 3–5 | 4–5 | 7–6 | 8–6 |
| Montreal | 3–6 | 4–9 | 5–2 | 3–4 | 3–6 | 4–8 | 2–7 | 4–5 | 4–5 | — | 5–8 | 6–6 | 3–6 | 5–3 | 4–5 | 5–4 | 8–10 |
| New York | 2–7 | 3–9 | 6–3 | 5–5 | 5–4 | 10–3 | 5–4 | 4–4 | 5–2 | 8–5 | — | 6–6 | 7–2 | 7–2 | 7–2 | 5–2 | 12–6 |
| Philadelphia | 1–8 | 5–8 | 7–2 | 3–6 | 4–5 | 11–2 | 1–6 | 3–6 | 4–5 | 6–6 | 6–6 | — | 3–4 | 6–3 | 2–6 | 4–5 | 11–7 |
| Pittsburgh | 2–5 | 3–6 | 6–7 | 6–7 | 7–2 | 4–3 | 7–5 | 6–3 | 4–8 | 6–3 | 2–7 | 4–3 | — | 3–6 | 4–5 | 7–5 | 7–8 |
| San Diego | 2–11 | 4–5 | 3–6 | 3–6 | 9–4 | 6–3 | 1–8 | 9–3 | 5–3 | 3–5 | 2–7 | 3–6 | 6–3 | — | 5–7 | 2–7 | 11–4 |
| San Francisco | 3–9 | 5–4 | 7–1 | 5–4 | 9–4 | 5–4 | 4–5 | 5–8 | 5–4 | 5–4 | 2–7 | 6–2 | 5–4 | 7–5 | — | 6–3 | 7–8 |
| St. Louis | 4–4 | 1–8 | 5–7 | 4–8 | 5–4 | 4–3 | 7–5 | 6–3 | 6–7 | 4–5 | 2–5 | 5–4 | 5–7 | 7–2 | 3–6 | — | 7–8 |

=== Notable transactions ===
- August 3, 1999: Josh Dimmick (minors) was traded by the Astros to the Minnesota Twins for George Williams.
- August 31, 1999: Alex Diaz was released by the Astros.

=== Roster ===
1999 Houston Astros
Roster
| Pitchers: 38 Sean Bergman; 51 José Cabrera; 50 Scott Elarton; 10 Mike Hampton; 19 Doug Henry; 44,45 Chris Holt; 42 José Lima; 47 Jeff McCurry; 46 Trever Miller; 52 Wade Miller; 39 Jay Powell; 37 Shane Reynolds; 58 Joe Slusarski; 13 Billy Wagner; 53 Brian Williams | Catchers: 6 Paul Bako; 20 Tony Eusebio; 17 Randy Knorr; 21 Mitch Meluskey; Infielders: 5 Jeff Bagwell; 7 Craig Biggio; 27 Tim Bogar; 11 Ken Caminiti; 12 Ricky Gutiérrez; 4 Carlos Hernández; 36 Jack Howell; 9 Russ Johnson; 28 Bill Spiers | Outfielders: 29 Glen Barker; 14 Derek Bell; 22 Lance Berkman; 1,2 Alex Diaz; 3 Carl Everett; 15 Richard Hidalgo; 38 Stan Javier; 23 Matt Mieske; 35 Ryan Thompson; 31 Daryle Ward | Manager: 49 Larry Dierker; Coaches: 25 José Cruz (first base); 24 Mike Cubbage (third base); 8 Matt Galante (bench); 16 Tom McCraw (hitting); 48 Vern Ruhle (pitching); 30 John Tamargo (bullpen) |

== Player stats ==
Table legend
| League leader (Bold: MLB leader) | Team leader | * | Left-handed batter or pitcher |
| League top ten | Leader in appearances at position | # | Switch hitter |

=== Batting ===
Abbreviations key

- ⌖ — primary position
- G — games played
- PA — plate appearances
- AB — at bats
- R — runs
- H — hits
- 2B — doubles
- HR — home runs
- RBI — runs batted in
- BB — base on balls
- SB — stolen bases
- TB — total bases
- AVG — batting average
- OBP — on-base percentage
- SLG — slugging percentage
- OPS — on-base plus slugging

==== Starters by position ====
Regular season batting results
| ⌖ | Player | G | PA | AB | R | H | 2B | HR | RBI | SB | BB | AVG | OBP | SLG |
|---|---|---|---|---|---|---|---|---|---|---|---|---|---|---|
| C | Tony Eusebio | 103 | 363 | 323 | 31 | 88 | 15 | 4 | 33 | 0 | 40 | .272 | .353 | .356 |
| 1B | Jeff Bagwell | **162** | 729 | 562 | **143** | 171 | 35 | 42 | 126 | 30 | **149** | .304 | .454 | .581 |
| 2B | Craig Biggio | 160 | **749** | 639 | 123 | 188 | **56** | 16 | 73 | 28 | 88 | .294 | .386 | .457 |
| 3B | Ken Caminiti^{#} | 78 | 329 | 273 | 45 | 78 | 11 | 13 | 56 | 6 | 49 | .286 | .386 | .476 |
| SS | Tim Bogar | 106 | 354 | 309 | 44 | 74 | 16 | 4 | 31 | 3 | 38 | .239 | .328 | .343 |
| LF | Richard Hidalgo | 108 | 449 | 383 | 49 | 87 | 25 | 15 | 56 | 8 | 56 | .227 | .328 | .420 |
| CF | Carl Everett^{#} | 123 | 535 | 464 | 86 | 151 | 33 | 25 | 108 | 27 | 50 | .325 | .398 | .571 |
| RF | Derek Bell | 128 | 568 | 509 | 61 | 120 | 22 | 12 | 66 | 18 | 50 | .236 | .306 | .350 |

==== Other batters ====
Regular season batting results
| Player | G | AB | H | Avg. | HR | RBI |
| Bill Spiers* | 127 | 393 | 113 | .288 | 4 | 39 |
| Ricky Gutiérrez | 85 | 268 | 70 | .261 | 1 | 25 |
| Paul Bako* | 73 | 215 | 55 | .256 | 2 | 17 |
| Russ Johnson | 83 | 156 | 44 | .282 | 5 | 23 |
| Daryle Ward* | 64 | 150 | 41 | .273 | 8 | 30 |
| Matt Mieske | 54 | 109 | 31 | .284 | 5 | 22 |
| Lance Berkman^{#} | 34 | 93 | 22 | .237 | 4 | 15 |
| Glen Barker^{#} | 81 | 73 | 21 | .288 | 1 | 11 |
| Stan Javier^{#} | 20 | 64 | 21 | .328 | 0 | 4 |
| Alex Diaz^{#} | 30 | 50 | 11 | .220 | 1 | 7 |
| Jack Howell* | 37 | 33 | 7 | .212 | 1 | 1 |
| Mitch Meluskey^{#} | 10 | 33 | 7 | .212 | 1 | 3 |
| Randy Knorr | 13 | 30 | 5 | .167 | 0 | 0 |
| Ryan Thompson | 12 | 20 | 4 | .200 | 1 | 5 |
| Carlos Hernández | 16 | 14 | 2 | .143 | 0 | 1 |

=== Pitching ===
==== Starting pitchers ====
Note: G = Games pitched; IP = Innings pitched; W = Wins; L = Losses; ERA = Earned run average; SO = Strikeouts

| Player | G | IP | W | L | ERA | SO |
| Mike Hampton | 35 | 246.1 | 22 | 4 | 3.58 | 177 |
| José Lima | 34 | 239.0 | 21 | 10 | 2.90 | 187 |
| Shane Reynolds | 34 | 231.2 | 16 | 14 | 3.85 | 197 |
| Chris Holt | 32 | 164.0 | 5 | 13 | 4.66 | 115 |
| Sean Bergman | 19 | 99.0 | 4 | 6 | 5.36 | 38 |

==== Other pitchers ====
Note: G = Games pitched; IP = Innings pitched; W = Wins; L = Losses; ERA = Earned run average; SO = Strikeouts

| Player | G | IP | W | L | ERA | SO |
| Scott Elarton | 42 | 124.0 | 9 | 5 | 3.48 | 121 |
| Wade Miller | 5 | 10.1 | 0 | 1 | 9.58 | 8 |

==== Relief pitchers ====
Note: G = Games pitched; W = Wins; L = Losses; SV = Saves; ERA = Earned run average; SO = Strikeouts

| Player | G | W | L | SV | ERA | SO |
| Billy Wagner | 66 | 4 | 1 | 39 | 1.57 | 124 |
| Jay Powell | 67 | 5 | 4 | 4 | 4.32 | 77 |
| Brian Williams | 50 | 2 | 1 | 0 | 4.41 | 53 |
| Trever Miller | 47 | 3 | 2 | 1 | 5.07 | 37 |
| Doug Henry | 35 | 2 | 3 | 2 | 4.65 | 36 |
| José Cabrera | 26 | 4 | 0 | 0 | 2.15 | 28 |
| Jeff McCurry | 5 | 0 | 1 | 0 | 15.75 | 3 |
| Joe Slusarski | 3 | 0 | 0 | 0 | 0.00 | 3 |

== National League Divisional Playoffs ==
=== Atlanta Braves vs. Houston Astros ===
Atlanta wins series, 3-1

| Game | Score | Date |
|---|---|---|
| 1 | Houston 6, Atlanta 1 | October 5 |
| 2 | Atlanta 5, Houston 1 | October 6 |
| 3 | Atlanta 5, Houston 3 (12 innings) | October 8 |
| 4 | Atlanta 7, Houston 5 | October 9 |

== Awards and achievements ==
=== Offensive achievements ===
==== Grand slams ====
| No. | Date | Astros batter | Venue | Inning | Pitcher | Opposing team | Box |
|---|---|---|---|---|---|---|---|
| 1 | June 13 | Derek Bell (Note: 1st MLB grand slam) | Astrodome | 6 (Note: Tied score or took lead) | Heath Murray | San Diego Padres | |
| 2 | June 20 | Carl Everett | Astrodome | 8 | Ugueth Urbina | Montreal Expos | |
| 3 | July 23 | Matt Mieske | Astrodome | 8 | Donne Wall | San Diego Padres | |
| 4 | July 28 | Jeff Bagwell | Coors Field | 7 | Mike Porzio | Colorado Rockies | |
| 5 | August 31 | Ken Caminiti | Astrodome | 8 | Turk Wendell | New York Mets | |

==== Power–speed club ====
30 home runs–30 stolen bases club
| Player | AVG | Runs | HR | SB | PSN |
|---|---|---|---|---|---|
| Jeff Bagwell | .304 | 143 | 42 | 30 | 35.0 |

=== Career honors ===
Honors received in 1999
| Name of honor | Player | Position | Houston Astros career | | | | | Biography | | Ref. |
| Name of honor | Player | Position | Uni. | Seasons | Games | Start | Finish | Biography | | Ref. |
|---|---|---|---|---|---|---|---|---|---|---|
| Major League Baseball All-Century Team | Nolan Ryan | Starting pitcher | 34 (Note: Uniform number retired during 1996 season.) | 9 | 282 | 1980 | 1988 | 992,040 votes | | |
| National Baseball Hall of Fame inductee | Nolan Ryan | Starting pitcher | 34 | 9 | 282 | 1980 | 1988 | Class | Plaque | |
See also: Members of the Baseball Hall of Fame

=== Annual awards ===
1999 Houston Astros award winners
| Name of award | | | Recipient | Ref. |
|---|---|---|---|---|
| Associated Press (AP) All-Star | | First baseman | Jeff Bagwell | |
| Fred Hartman Award for Long and Meritorious Service to Baseball | | | Mickey Herskowitz | |
| Houston-Area Major League Player of the Year | | CLE | Mike Jackson | |
| Houston Astros | | Most Valuable Player (MVP) | Jeff Bagwell | |
| Houston Astros | | Pitcher of the Year | Mike Hampton | |
| Houston Astros | | Rookie of the Year | Daryle Ward | |
| MLB All-Star Game | | Home Run Derby contestant | Jeff Bagwell | |
| MLB All-Star Game | | Starting designated hitter | Jeff Bagwell | |
| MLB All-Star Game | | Reserve pitcher | Mike Hampton | |
| MLB All-Star Game | | Reserve pitcher | José Lima | |
| MLB All-Star Game | | Reserve pitcher | Billy Wagner | |
| National League (NL) Player of the Week | | May 16 | Carl Everett | |
| Players Choice Awards | | NL Outstanding Pitcher | Mike Hampton | |
| Rolaids Relief Man Award | | | Billy Wagner | |
| Silver Slugger Award | | First baseman | Jeff Bagwell | |
| Silver Slugger Award | | Pitcher | Mike Hampton | |
| The Sporting News | NL Pitcher of the Year: | | Mike Hampton | |
| The Sporting News | NL All-Stars | Pitcher | Mike Hampton | |
| The Sporting News | NL All-Stars | Pitcher | José Lima | |
| The Sporting News | NL All-Stars | First baseman | Jeff Bagwell | |

Other awards results

| Name of award | Voting recipient(s) (Team) | Ref. |
|---|---|---|
| NL Cy Young Award | 1st—R. Johnson (ARI) • 2nd—Hampton (HOU) • 4th—Lima (HOU) • 4th—Wagner (HOU) | |
| NL Most Valuable Player | 1st—C. Jones (ATL) • 2nd—Bagwell (HOU); Other Astros: 12th—Biggio • 16th—Wagner • 17th—Everett • 21st—Hampton | |
| NL Manager of the Year | 1st—McKeon (CIN) • 3rd—Dierker (HOU) | |

=== League leaders ===
NL batting leaders

- Bases on balls: Jeff Bagwell (149—led MLB)
- Games played: Jeff Bagwell (162—tied for MLB lead)
- Doubles: Craig Biggio (56—led MLB)
- Plate appearances: Craig Biggio (749—led MLB)
- Runs scored: Jeff Bagwell (143—led MLB)

NL pitching leaders

- Bases on balls per nine innings pitched (BB/9): Shane Reynolds (1.4—led MLB)
- Earned run average (ERA, relievers, min. 50 innings}: Billy Wagner
- Games started: José Lima & Shane Reynolds (35—tied for MLB lead)
- Strikeout-to-walk ratio (K/BB): Shane Reynolds (5.32)
- Wins: Mike Hampton (22)
- Winning percentage: Mike Hampton (.846)

=== Astrodome career leaders ===
Batting leaders

- Bases on balls: Jimmy Wynn (458)
- Home runs: Jeff Bagwell (126)
- Triples: José Cruz (50)

Source: (Note: In cumulative seasons, in the regular season, from 1901 to 2025, HOU-Astrodome (within ballparks), sorted by greatest home runs.)

Pitching leaders

- Complete games: Larry Dierker (67)
- Strikeouts: Nolan Ryan (1,004)

Source: (Note: In cumulative seasons, in the regular season, from 1901 to 2025, HOU-Astrodome (within ballparks), sorted by greatest complete games.)

=== Milestones ===
==== Major League debuts ====
Player—Appeared at position

- Lance Berkman, pinch hitter
Date and opponent

- July 16 vs Detroit
Box

Also:

== Minor league system ==
| Level | Team | League | Manager |
|---|---|---|---|
| AAA | New Orleans Zephyrs | Pacific Coast League | Tony Peña |
| AA | Jackson Generals | Texas League | Jim Pankovits |
| A | Kissimmee Cobras | Florida State League | Manny Acta |
| A | Michigan Battle Cats | Midwest League | Al Pedrique |
| A-Short Season | Auburn Doubledays | New York–Penn League | Lyle Yates |
| Rookie | Martinsville Astros | Appalachian League | Brad Wellman |

LEAGUE CHAMPIONS: Martinsville

Awards

- All-Star Futures Game—Left fielder: Lance Berkman
- Houston Astros Minor League Player of the Year: Aaron McNeal, 1B
- Midwest League All-Stars
  - First baseman—Aaron McNeal
  - Second baseman—Aaron Miles
- Midwest League Most Valuable Player (MVP) Award: Aaron McNeal

== See also ==
- 30–30 club
- List of Major League Baseball annual doubles leaders
- List of Major League Baseball annual runs scored leaders
- List of Major League Baseball annual wins leaders
- List of Major League Baseball doubles records
- List of Major League Baseball franchise postseason streaks
- List of Major League Baseball pitchers who have thrown an immaculate inning
