= Glen Barker =

American baseball player (born 1971)

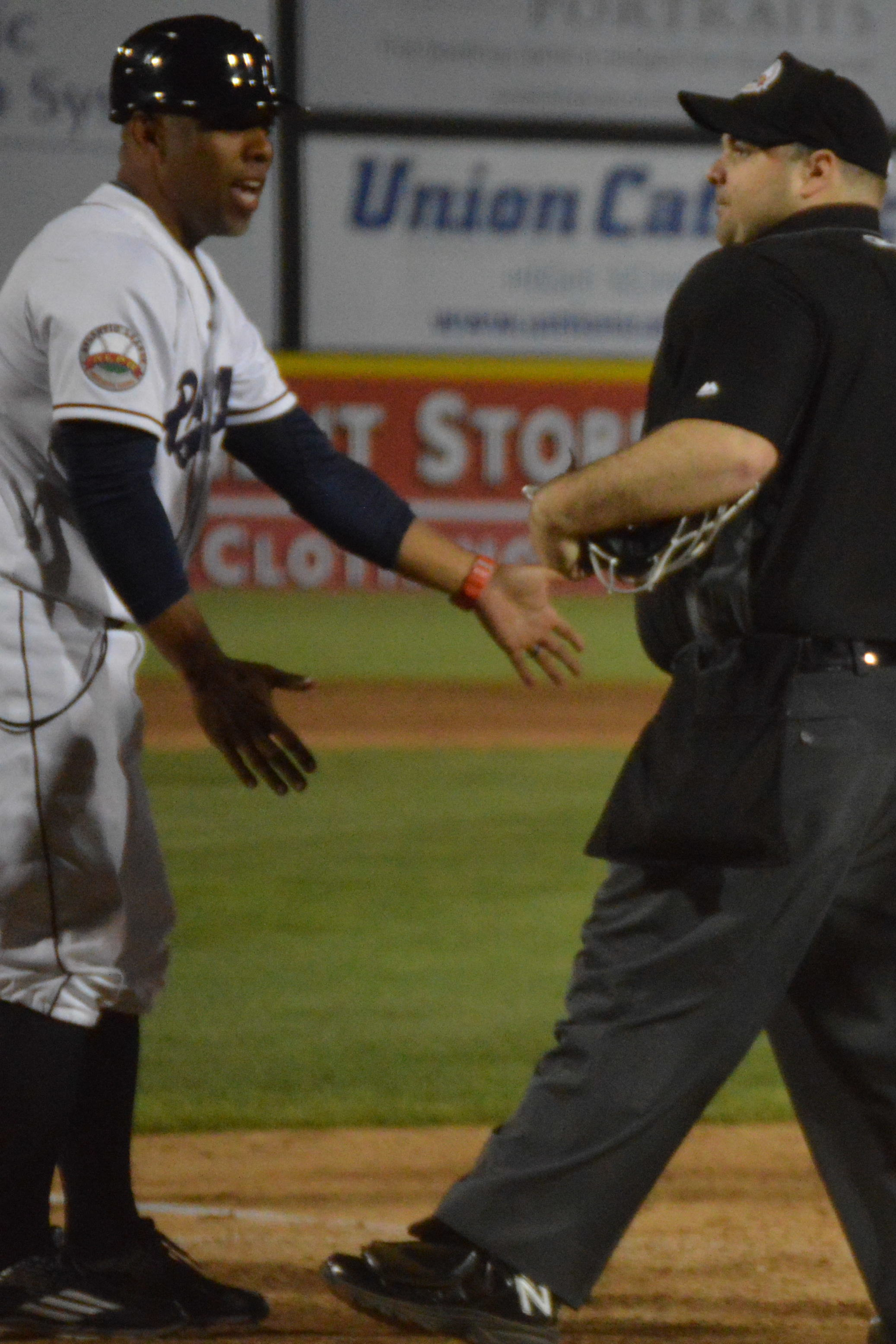
- Barker (left) with the Somerset Patriots in 2018
- Outfielder
- Born: May 10, 1971 (age 55); Albany, New York, U.S.
- Batted: Switch Threw: Right

MLB debut
- April 7, 1999, for the Houston Astros

Last MLB appearance
- October 7, 2001, for the Houston Astros

MLB statistics
- Batting average: .232
- Hits: 38
- Stolen bases: 30
- Stats at Baseball Reference

Teams
- Houston Astros (1999–2001)

Glen F. Barker (born May 10, 1971) is an American former outfielder in Major League Baseball (MLB) who played three seasons for the Houston Astros. He was a leadoff hitter who was known for his defensive skills and was used mainly as a pinch runner. He has the rare distinction of having more major league career runs scored (53) than hits (38). Barker is also one of only seven players to have had more career games appearances than plate appearances. He currently serves as a scout for the Astros.

== Career ==
Barker attended Albany High School and the College of Saint Rose, an NCAA Division II school in one of the only college conferences to use wood bats throughout the league's season.

Barker was selected by the Detroit Tigers in the 11th Round (305th overall) of the 1993 amateur entry draft. Known for his speed on the basepaths (238 career minor league stolen bases) and in center field, Barker advanced as far as Triple A with the Toledo Mud Hens, but was selected by the Houston Astros from the Tigers in the 1998 MLB Rule 5 draft. Per Rule 5, he spent the 1999 season on the Astros' roster.

Because of his last name, Barker gained temporary distinction as one of the Astros' "Killer B's", which included first baseman Jeff Bagwell and second baseman Craig Biggio, two formidable veteran players who helped established the Astros as perennial playoff contenders in the 1990s and 2000s. In fact, journalist Dayn Perry jocosely noted the 1999 Astros, "in pursuit of arcane history, used eight players whose last names began with 'B.'" The eight included Bagwell, Paul Bako, Barker, Derek Bell, Sean Bergman, Lance Berkman, Biggio, and Tim Bogar.

Successful in very limited playing time, the Astros used Barker mostly as a pinch runner and sometimes as a pinch hitter. Barker played in 81 games, made 90 plate appearances and batted .288 with a .384 on-base percentage and 17 stolen bases that season. He scored 23 runs while having 21 hits. He appeared in two games against Atlanta Braves in the National League Division Series (NLDS), stealing a base and scoring a run.

Barker spent the 2000 season between the major league club and AAA New Orleans. He struggled for the Astros, batting .224 in 67 at-bats. Similar results followed in 2001, as he struggled even more at the plate (.083 batting average in just 24 at-bats) and was again used primarily as a pinch runner. Although attracted to Barker's blazing speed, the Astros felt that his bat was not developing as they had hoped, and they released him after the 2001 season.

Before the 2002 season, Barker was signed by the Montreal Expos but released after spring training. He was picked up by the Boston Red Sox and assigned to AAA Pawtucket. Again, Barker struggled with the bat and was released by the Red Sox after appearing in only 14 games. He signed with Reynosa in the Mexican League and spent the remainder of the season there.

He signed with the Atlanta Braves before the 2003 season but was once again released after Spring Training. He played 3 games with the Somerset Patriots, an independent team in the Atlantic League, before being picked up by the Baltimore Orioles and assigned to the AA Bowie Baysox. After batting just .237 in a brief stint for the Baysox, Barker retired from baseball.

== Personal life ==
Barker is married and resides in Cherry Hill, New Jersey. He now works as an elementary school as a PE teacher. He was the outfield/baserunning coordinator for the San Diego Padres. Barker also served as the hitting coach for the Somerset Patriots.
