= Derek Bell (baseball) =

American baseball player (born 1968)

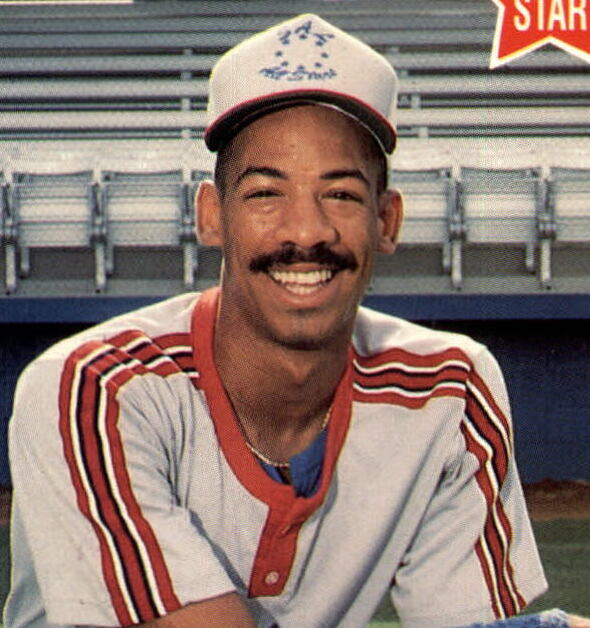
- Bell c. 1988
- Outfielder
- Born: December 11, 1968 (age 57); Tampa, Florida, U.S.
- Batted: Right Threw: Right

MLB debut
- June 28, 1991, for the Toronto Blue Jays

Last MLB appearance
- July 3, 2001, for the Pittsburgh Pirates

MLB statistics
- Batting average: .276
- Home runs: 134
- Runs batted in: 668
- Stats at Baseball Reference

Teams
- Toronto Blue Jays (1991–1992); San Diego Padres (1993–1994); Houston Astros (1995–1999); New York Mets (2000); Pittsburgh Pirates (2001)

Career highlights and awards
- World Series champion (1992)

Derek Nathaniel Bell (born December 11, 1968) is an American former professional baseball outfielder. He played in Major League Baseball for the Toronto Blue Jays, San Diego Padres, Houston Astros, New York Mets, and Pittsburgh Pirates from 1991 to 2001. With the Blue Jays, he was a member of the 1992 World Series champions.

== Amateur and minor league career ==
Bell is one of only eleven players to play in both the Little League World Series and the Major League World Series. In 1980 and 1981 Bell played for Belmont Heights Little League in Tampa, Florida, winning the US championship and losing to Taiwan in the world championship game both years. (Bell is also the only player to appear in the LLWS twice and later in the big-league World Series.)

When he reached C. Leon King High School in Tampa, Bell attracted the attention of the Toronto Blue Jays. Toronto selected him in the second round of the 1987 June draft, with the 49th overall pick. Bell signed with Toronto, and made his debut that same year in the New York–Penn League. He emerged as a top prospect with the Myrtle Beach Blue Jays the next year, when he was named to the South Atlantic League All-Star team. Bell's .344 batting average earned him the league batting title, and he also displayed substantial power, hitting 29 doubles, five triples, and 12 home runs in only 352 at bats. His success helped him earn a late-season promotion to class AA.

Although he continued to advance, Bell struggled for the next two seasons, batting .242 at AA in 1989 and .261 at AAA the next year, but drawing walks at an extremely low rate. Despite being younger than most players in those leagues, he re-emerged as a top prospect in 1991, repeating AAA with the Syracuse Chiefs. That year, Bell batted .346 with 22 doubles, 12 triples, 13 home runs, 57 walks, and 29 stolen bases. Bell made the International League All-Star team and won the International League Most Valuable Player Award, and Baseball America magazine named him the Minor League Player of the Year.

== Major league career ==
=== Toronto Blue Jays ===
Bell made his Major League debut on June 28, 1991, starting in left field in a 3–1 loss to the Seattle Mariners. Bell was slated to be the Jays' starting left fielder in 1992, but broke his wrist in the second game of the year and ultimately appeared in only 61 games that year as the Blue Jays' fourth outfielder. Toronto won its division that year and advanced to the World Series, defeating the Atlanta Braves in six games to capture its first championship. On Fan Appreciation Day in 1992, the team played a trick on Bell. During a break between innings, they announced that a vehicle would be given to a lucky fan, and then outfielder Joe Carter (accompanied by Dave Winfield) drove Bell's green Ford Explorer out onto the field.

=== San Diego Padres ===
Shortly before the beginning of the 1993 season, the Blue Jays traded Bell and Stoney Briggs to the San Diego Padres, in exchange for veteran outfielder Darrin Jackson. It was in San Diego where Bell first established himself as an everyday player. He was still somewhat unrefined as a player, batting .262 and striking out more than five times as often as he walked in 1993, but he also displayed a good base of pure skills by hitting 21 home runs and stealing 26 bases.

Bell improved his batting average to .311 in 1994, despite off-the-field distractions. On April 25, Bell and pitcher Scott Sanders were arrested in New York City before a game against the New York Mets, as police claimed that the pair had offered undercover policewomen $20 in exchange for oral sex. The charges were ultimately dropped on October 25. In December, Bell was part of a 12-player trade between the Padres and the Houston Astros. Along with Bell, the Padres sent Doug Brocail, Ricky Gutiérrez, Pedro A. Martínez, Phil Plantier, and Craig Shipley to Houston, receiving in return Ken Caminiti, Andújar Cedeño, Steve Finley, Roberto Petagine, Brian Williams, and Sean Fesh.

=== Houston Astros ===
After Bell joined the Houston Astros, his last name, hitting skills and speed positioned him in Houston's vaunted lineup of "Killer B's", established by Jeff Bagwell and Craig Biggio. This group of players helped lead the franchise to a new level of success that included a string of playoff appearances and second-place finishes that commenced in the 1990s. Bell went on to enjoy one of the finest seasons of his career in 1995, with a .334 batting average that was fourth-highest in the league. He drew consideration in the Most Valuable Player Award (MVP) voting, placing fourteenth place with 12 points. The team won three straight National League Central division championships from 1997−99. Bell's year-to-year performance varied considerably, but he peaked in 1998. That season, he batted .314 with 41 doubles and 22 home runs, good for an OPS of .855 as the Astros won a franchise-record 102 games.

After the Killer B's had gained national attention, journalist Dayn Perry cheerfully noted in 1999 that the Astros, "in pursuit of arcane history, used eight players whose last names began with 'B.'" including Bagwell, Paul Bako, Glen Barker, Bell, Sean Bergman, Lance Berkman, Biggio, and Tim Bogar. However, Bell's performance slipped substantially that year, and his .236 batting average and .656 OPS made him considered to be one of the worst everyday players in the league. He compounded the problem in an ill-timed confrontation with manager Larry Dierker on July 22. Dierker had returned to the field that day after having recovered from a near-fatal grand mal seizure during a game on June 13 and subsequent emergency brain surgery. Bell was upset that Dierker had moved him from second to sixth in the batting order, ranting after the game that "it's a slap in the face to be dropped to the sixth spot. I'm to the point now that I feel like I'm not wanted." Many Astros fans were upset that Bell had chosen to criticize Dierker on a day honoring him, and Dierker ultimately pulled Bell from the starting lineup later that season.

At that point, the Astros viewed Bell as an expensive liability, and on December 23, they traded him and star pitcher Mike Hampton to the New York Mets for Roger Cedeño, Octavio Dotel, and Kyle Kessel. When assembling this trade, the Astros let it be known that they would not trade Hampton unless a trade partner was willing to also take Bell in the deal.

=== New York Mets ===
When informed that he'd been traded to the Mets, Bell said, "Christmas came early for me. I'm very happy. I told my agent I'm going to run, I'm so excited." With Bell as their starting right fielder, the Mets made the playoffs as the National League Wild Card. On August 21, Bell got the opportunity to pitch the eighth inning of a blowout against the Padres. His first pitch, which Bell described as an eephus pitch, was clocked at 47 MPH, and he ultimately surrendered three hits and three walks, giving up four earned runs and one unearned run (resulting from an error by catcher Todd Pratt).

Bell sprained his ankle during the first game of the NLDS, and missed the remainder of the playoffs. Following the 2000 season, Bell's contract with the Mets expired and the team made no effort to retain his services. He later signed a two-year contract with the Pittsburgh Pirates in the offseason, following the World Series.

=== Pittsburgh Pirates and "Operation Shutdown" ===
In 2001, Bell was the Pirates starting right fielder, but he struggled at the plate; by mid-May, he was batting only .136. Bell was sent down to Triple–A Nashville, but didn't do much there either: .162 with a home run in 68 at-bats. Nevertheless, he came back to Pittsburgh in mid-June and did fairly well over the next fifteen games, hitting .261 with four homers in 46 at-bats. Still, this only raised his 2001 big-league average to .173, and Bell did not play an MLB game after July 3, when he managed a hit and two walks in a win over Cincinnati; this would turn out to be his last major league appearance.

In spring training 2002, Bell learned that he would have to compete for the Pirates' starting right field job. Despite his poor 2001 season (and the fact he was hitting just .148 that spring), Bell did not feel that he needed to prove he was worthy of being a starter.

On March 18, Bell told reporters:

Nobody told me I was in competition. If there is competition, somebody better let me know. If there is competition, they better eliminate me out of the race and go ahead and do what they're going to do with me. I ain't never hit in spring training and I never will. If it ain't settled with me out there, then they can trade me. I ain't going out there to hurt myself in spring training battling for a job. If it is [a competition], then I'm going into 'Operation Shutdown.' Tell them exactly what I said. I haven't competed for a job since 1991.

Bell left the team on March 29, was released two days later, and never played pro baseball again. Still on the hook for Bell's guaranteed two-year, ten-million dollar contract, the Pirates paid him his $4.5 million though he did not play for them. Bell moved onto his yacht, Bell 14 (his name and uniform number), a 58-foot (18 m) Sea Ray 580. New York Post writer Tom Keegan described the incident by calling Bell "the perfect Pirate given that he lives on a boat and steals money."

== Personal life ==
Bell was the runner up to Ray Mickens at the 1999 Madden Bowl.

On April 20, 2006, Bell was charged with felony cocaine possession and possession of drug paraphernalia, after police found a warm crack pipe in the back seat of his car during a traffic stop. He was arrested again on December 2, 2008, facing three counts of possession of drug paraphernalia and one count of failure to appear in court on another charge of possession of drug paraphernalia from earlier in the year. Bell was arrested again on November 16, 2022, charged with possessing crack cocaine in Brooksville, Florida.
