= Tim Bogar =

American baseball player and coach (born 1966)

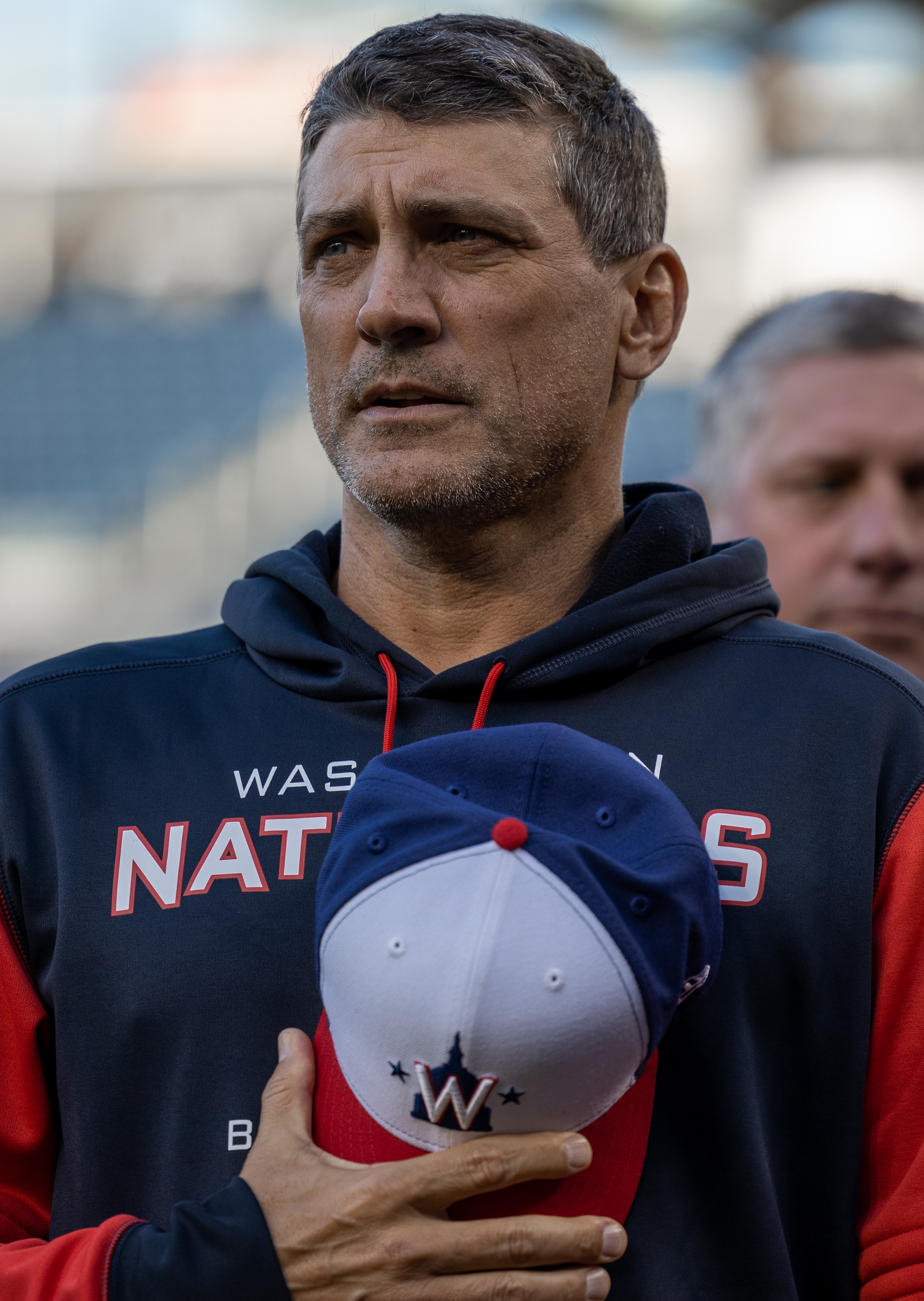
- Bogar with the Nationals in 2022
- Infielder / Third base coach
- Born: October 28, 1966 (age 59); Indianapolis, Indiana, U.S.
- Batted: Right Threw: Right

MLB debut
- April 21, 1993, for the New York Mets

Last MLB appearance
- July 1, 2001, for the Los Angeles Dodgers

MLB statistics
- Batting average: .228
- Home runs: 24
- Runs batted in: 161
- Managerial record: 14–8
- Winning %: .636
- Stats at Baseball Reference
- Managerial record at Baseball Reference

Teams
- As player: New York Mets (1993–1996); Houston Astros (1997–2000); Los Angeles Dodgers (2001); As manager: Texas Rangers (2014); As coach: Tampa Bay Rays (2008); Boston Red Sox (2009–2012); Texas Rangers (2014); Seattle Mariners (2016–2017); Washington Nationals (2018–2023); Arizona Diamondbacks (2025)

Career highlights and awards
- World Series champion (2019)

Timothy Paul Bogar (born October 28, 1966) is an American professional baseball coach and former infielder, manager, and front-office executive. He played in Major League Baseball (MLB) for the New York Mets, Houston Astros, and Los Angeles Dodgers, coached for the Tampa Bay Rays, Boston Red Sox, Texas Rangers, Seattle Mariners, and Washington Nationals, and managed the Rangers.

Born in Indianapolis, Indiana, Bogar graduated from John Hersey High School in Illinois and attended Eastern Illinois University, before being drafted by the New York Mets in the eighth round of the 1988 Major League Baseball draft. He threw and batted right-handed, and is listed at 6 feet 2 inches (1.88 m) tall and 198 pounds (90 kg).

== Playing career ==
Bogar played for three different teams during his nine-year career: the Mets (1993–96), Houston Astros (1997–2000), and Los Angeles Dodgers (2001). He made his Major League Baseball debut on April 21, 1993, and played his final game on July 1, 2001. For his career, Bogar hit .228 (345-for-1,516) with 69 doubles, nine triples, 24 home runs, 180 runs scored, 161 runs batted in and 13 stolen bases.

Because of his last name, Bogar gained distinction as one of the Astros' "Killer B's", which included first baseman Jeff Bagwell and second baseman Craig Biggio, two formidable veteran players who helped established the Astros as perennial playoff contenders in the 1990s and 2000s. In fact, journalist Dayn Perry jocosely noted the 1999 Astros, "in pursuit of arcane history, used eight players whose last names began with 'B.'" The eight included Bagwell, Paul Bako, Glen Barker, Derek Bell, Sean Bergman, Lance Berkman, Biggio, and Bogar.

His only postseason appearance came as a member of the Astros in the 1999 National League Division Series. Although Houston lost the NLDS three games to one to the Atlanta Braves, Bogar went three for four (.750) in two games played during the series.

== Post-playing career ==
=== Minor league managing career ===
Bogar has been named manager of the year in three different minor leagues.

Bogar started his managerial career in 2004 with the Greeneville Astros of the Rookie-level Appalachian League. Greeneville finished with a 41–26 (.612) record and won the Appalachian League championship and Bogar was selected as manager of the year. He was promoted in 2005 to the Astros' Low-A affiliate, the Lexington Legends of the South Atlantic League, where he led the Legends to a league best 82–57 mark and was named the 2005 SAL's top skipper.

He then switched to the Cleveland Indians' organization as pilot of the Akron Aeros, the Tribe's Double-A affiliate. In 2006, his first year with Akron, Bogar led the team to a league best 87–55 record and came within one game of winning the Eastern League title, captured that season by the Portland Sea Dogs. Bogar was named Eastern League manager of the year, and was selected to coach as part of Major League Baseball's 2006 All Star Futures Game. He was also selected by Baseball America as the "Best Manager Prospect" in the Eastern League in 2006. In 2007, Bogar's Aeros finished 80–61 and again made the final playoff round, losing to the Trenton Thunder, three games to one. He was also selected as a coach in the 2007 MLB All Star Futures Game in San Francisco.

After five seasons (2008–12) as a Major League coach, Bogar was hired to manage the Los Angeles Angels' Double-A affiliate, the Arkansas Travelers of the Texas League, on November 9, 2012. He led the 2013 Travelers to a 73–66 overall record and the second-half championship of the loop's Northern Division. The Travelers reached the final round of the Texas League playoffs before bowing to the San Antonio Missions.

Bogar was named manager of the Amarillo Sod Poodles for the 2024 season.

Bogar owns a five-year (2004–07; 2013) career minor-league managerial win–loss record of 362–266 (.576).

=== MLB coaching career ===
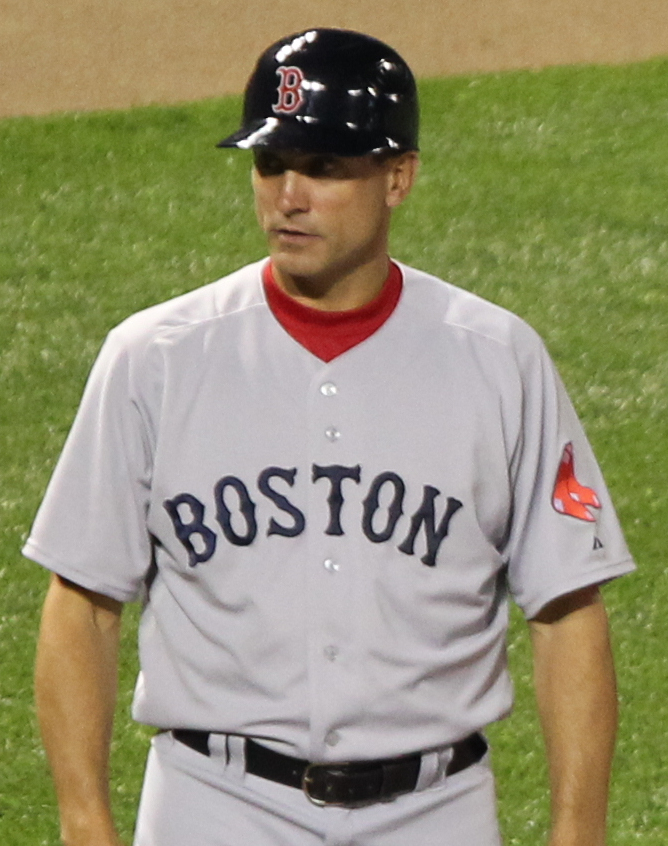
Bogar as Red Sox's third base coach in 2011

Bogar spent the 2008 season as a coaching assistant on the staff of Tampa Bay Rays manager Joe Maddon, as the Rays captured their first American League pennant.

On November 28, 2008, the Boston Red Sox announced that Bogar would join their coaching staff as the first base coach. After the 2009 season, he moved to the third base coach job, and then served one season, 2012, as the bench coach on Bobby Valentine's staff. However, Bogar was among several veteran Red Sox coaches who had previously worked under Terry Francona with whom Valentine did not get along, and Bogar departed the Boston organization on October 26, 2012, three weeks after Valentine's firing on October 4.

After his one-season tenure managing in the Texas League, Bogar was hired by the Texas Rangers as their bench coach on October 21, 2013, joining his fellow former Red Sox coach Dave Magadan in Arlington.

On September 5, 2014, Bogar was named interim manager for the remainder of the 2014 season by the Rangers, following the sudden resignation of Ron Washington after almost eight full seasons at the Rangers' helm. The Rangers went 14–8 (.636) during Bogar's stewardship. During their off-season search, the Rangers hired Jeff Banister, a veteran of the Pittsburgh Pirates' system, as manager. It was then announced that Bogar would not serve as bench coach under the new manager in 2015 and would pursue jobs outside the Rangers organization.

Bogar spent 2015 as special assistant to the general manager of the Los Angeles Angels, working under Jerry Dipoto, who was his teammate on the 1995–96 Mets. After Dipoto resigned from the Angels in June 2015, Bogar remained at his post. Dipoto became general manager of the Seattle Mariners at the close of the 2015 season. On October 23, he hired Scott Servais, the Angels' former director of player development, as the Mariners' 2016 manager, with Bogar appointed as Servais' bench coach. He served two seasons with the Mariners before his dismissal at the close of the 2017 season. Bogar joined Dave Martinez' Washington Nationals staff five weeks later; the two worked together under Maddon in Tampa Bay in 2008. He earned a World Series ring with the Nationals following the 2019 World Series, his first World Series championship as either a coach or player. He left the Nationals after the 2023 season, joining the front office of the Arizona Diamondbacks.

On August 22, 2025, Bogar returned to coaching, becoming the Diamondbacks' third base coach following the midseason reassignment of Shaun Larkin. After J. R. House was hired as the team's third base coach following the season, manager Torey Lovullo announced that Bogar would return to a minor league player development role.

=== Managerial record ===
As of games played 2018

Team	Year	Regular season					Postseason			
Team	Year	Games	Won	Lost	Win %	Finish	Won	Lost	Win %	Result
TEX	2014	22	14	8	.636	(interim)	–	–	–	–
TEX Total		22	14	8	.636		-	-	-	

Sporting positions
Preceded by Jorge Orta	Greeneville Astros manager 2004	Succeeded by Russ Nixon
Preceded by Ivan DeJesus	Lexington Legends manager 2005	Succeeded by Jack Lind
Preceded by Torey Lovullo	Akron Aeros manager 2006–2007	Succeeded by Mike Sarbaugh
Preceded by Luis Alicea	Boston Red Sox first base coach 2009	Succeeded by Ron Johnson
Preceded by DeMarlo Hale	Boston Red Sox third base coach 2010–2011	Succeeded by Jerry Royster
Preceded by DeMarlo Hale	Boston Red Sox bench coach 2012	Succeeded by Torey Lovullo
Preceded by Mike Micucci	Arkansas Travelers manager 2013	Succeeded by Phillip Wellman
Preceded by Jackie Moore	Texas Rangers bench coach 2014	Succeeded by Steve Buechele
Preceded by Ron Washington	Texas Rangers manager 2014	Succeeded by Jeff Banister
Preceded by Trent Jewett	Seattle Mariners bench coach 2016–2017	Succeeded by Manny Acta
Preceded by Davey Lopes	Washington Nationals first base coach 2018–2019	Succeeded by Bob Henley
Preceded by Chip Hale	Washington Nationals bench coach 2020–2023	Succeeded by Miguel Cairo
Preceded by Shaun Larkin	Arizona Diamondbacks Third base coach 2025–Present	Succeeded by TBA
