= Tony Eusebio =

Dominican baseball player (born 1967)

- Catcher
- Born: April 27, 1967 (age 59); Los Llanos, Dominican Republic
- Batted: Right Threw: Right

MLB debut
- August 8, 1991, for the Houston Astros

Last MLB appearance
- October 7, 2001, for the Houston Astros

MLB statistics
- Batting average: .275
- Home runs: 30
- Runs batted in: 241
- Stats at Baseball Reference

Teams
- Houston Astros (1991, 1994–2001)

Raul Antonio Bare Eusebio (born April 27, 1967) is a Dominican former Major League Baseball catcher who played for the Houston Astros.

In 2000, Eusebio set a Houston Astros franchise record for consecutive games with a hit with 24, although the mark has since been surpassed by Jeff Kent and Willy Taveras. Because Eusebio was a catcher and did not play in every game, his 24-game hitting streak came over a span of 51 days in which time the Astros played 45 games. This was the longest time ever for a 24-game single season streak. The streak tied for longest in the National League in 2000. During and after his streak, Eusebio was often referred to affectionately as "The Astro Clipper" in a sort of mock homage to Joe DiMaggio, "The Yankee Clipper" and holder of the MLB record hit streak.

== Career ==
=== Minor leagues (1985–1991) ===
Tony Eusebio signed with the Astros on May 30, 1985 as an undrafted free agent. He started his professional career at age 18 with the Gulf Coast League Astros that same year, although he only played in one game and had one at bat. In 1986, Eusebio played in the Dominican Summer League. Eusebio rejoined the Rookie League team in 1987 and steadily rose through the Astros' minor league ranks. In 1988, he played for the High-A Osceola Astros and stole a career high 20 bases. Eusebio also appeared on the 40-man winter roster in 1988, and joined the Astros' big-league camp during spring training in 1989. After spring training, he started the year at the AA Columbus Mudcats before being sent back down to the Osceola Astros after hitting .187. In 1990, Eusebio again played for the Columbus Mudcats. He led all Southern League catchers with a .994 fielding percentage before suffering a broken thumb on August 4, 1990. Eusebio also appeared in the Southern League All-Star Game in 1990. At the start of the 1991 season, he played for the AA Jackson Generals.

=== First taste of the Majors (1991) ===
On August 4, 1991 Eusebio was called up from the Jackson Generals when Astros catcher Scott Servais was placed on the 15-day disabled list after sustaining a broken bone in his right hand. Five days later, Eusebio would make his Major League debut, starting a game on August 8, 1991 against the San Diego Padres. Eusebio would go on to appear in 10 games for the Astros, hitting .105 in 19 at-bats.

=== Back to the minors (1992–1993) ===
Eusebio spent the 1992 season at the AA Jackson Generals, appearing in 94 games and hitting .307 which ranked third in the league. He was also named to the league's post season All-Star team. In 1993, he played at the AAA Tucson Toros, appearing in 78 games and hitting .324. While at Tucson, Eusebio compiled a 24-game hitting streak before being placed on the disabled list. He would go on to set a Tucson Toros record by extending this hitting streak to 30 games during a rehab stint in 1996.

=== In the majors for good (1994–2001) ===
After hitting .625 during spring training in 1994, Eusebio made the Major League squad. During the strike shortened season Eusebio hit .296 with 30 RBIs in just 55 games. His play was such that he won the starting catcher's job over previous starter Scott Servais, and garnered consideration in the National League Rookie of the Year race.

In 1995, Eusebio appeared in a career high 113 games for the Astros hitting an all-time best .299 and posting over 100 hits for the only time in his career. For much of the year Eusebio led the Astros in batting average, although his production tailed off in September. Entering the 1996 season, newly acquired catcher Rick Wilkins was expected to get most of the work behind the plate with Eusebio reserved to facing left-handed opposing pitchers. Compounding his diminished role, Eusebio suffered a left-wrist sprain in spring training and later spent over a month on the disabled-list due to a cyst that was surgically removed from this the same wrist. Less than a week after returning to the lineup, Eusebio suffered a broken bone in his left hand and missed another month and a half. Because of his multiple injuries, Eusebio appeared in only 58 games hitting .270.

Before the 1997 season, the Astros traded for catcher Brad Ausmus. After manager Larry Dierker made known his intentions to have Ausmus start a vast majority of games, Eusebio requested to be traded from the team. Dierker would later agree to give Eusebio more playing time, although the manager made it clear he wished Eusebio would improve his defensive skills. However, as the season wore on, Eusebio would gradually see less playing time due to a nagging knee injury. His playing time would later be reduced to only catching when Darryl Kile pitched, and the injury would force him to have arthroscopic surgery during the offseason.

The 1998 season began with Eusebio in the same backup catcher role he occupied in 1997. After successfully recovering from offseason surgery, Eusebio made a noticeable offensive difference in the games he started. After the season, the Astros traded away Brad Ausmus leaving a void at the starting catcher position. Expressing his confidence in Eusebio, Astros General Manager Gerry Hunsicker stated, "I can't make the Ausmus trade if we don't have Tony." Eusebio would split playing time with catcher Paul Bako during the 1999 season, ultimately hitting .272 and appearing in 103 games. Eusebio would also hit a home run in the last game played at the Astrodome, a 7–5 loss to the Atlanta Braves in the 1999 National League Division Series.

After the 1999 season, Eusebio became a free agent for the first time. In November of that year he signed a 2-year $2.4 million contract with the Astros and was projected to be the starting catcher. Eusebio started opening day, but as the season wore on his playing time was cut due to his low batting average and the Astros' commitment to new catcher Mitch Meluskey. Despite this slow start, Eusebio's hitting picked up in the second half of the season. His hot streak culminated on August 28, 2000, when he hit safely in his 24th consecutive game, setting an Astros' record. This accomplishment brought him the most recognition of his career, but just a few days later Eusebio's season ended when he suffered a dislocated shoulder after a headfirst fall over the Astros' dugout railing. Shortly afterwards, Eusebio had successful surgery to repair the injury.

Coming into the 2001 season, Eusebio's role as a backup catcher was solidified by the Astros' re-acquisition of Brad Ausmus. Eusebio appeared in only 59 games, hitting .253. He played his final major league game on October 12, 2001, going 2–3 with a double and a run scored as the Atlanta Braves swept the Astros in the National League Division Series.

==== Kangaroo Court ====
In addition to his playing duties, Eusebio also ran the Astros' Kangaroo Court for many years. Although known as an easygoing person outside of the court, Eusebio presided over it with a firm demeanor. "No one got away from the court," Eusebio said. "It didn't matter how popular you were or how much money you made. In that court, everyone was the same."

=== Rockies, Expos playing attempts (2002–2003) ===
After the 2001 season, the Astros did not offer Eusebio arbitration and he again became a free agent. On January 4, 2002 the Colorado Rockies agreed to terms with Eusebio on a one-year, $550,000 contract. After showing up to spring training overweight and refusing to play with a minor league club, Eusebio was placed on waivers before the regular season started and did not play in the majors that year. In 2003, the Montreal Expos invited him to camp. After hitting .111 in spring training, Eusebio did not make the team.

== Notes ==
Achievements
| Preceded by Art Howe & Luis Gonzalez | Houston Astros longest hitting streak 2000—2004 | Succeeded by Jeff Kent |
