= Matt Galante =

American baseball player and coach (born 1944)

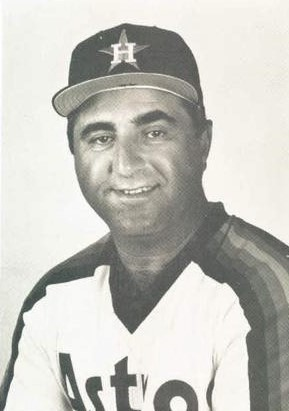
- Coach
- Born: March 22, 1944 (age 81); Brooklyn, New York, U.S.

Teams
- As manager: Houston Astros (1999); As coach: Houston Astros (1985–1996, 1998–2001); New York Mets (2002–2004)

Matthew Joseph Galante (born March 22, 1944) is an American former infielder and coach in Major League Baseball (MLB) who served as the interim manager for the Houston Astros in 1999. He has also managed the Italy national team in international competition.

== Playing career ==
The 5 ft 6 in (1.68 m), 157 lb (71 kg) Galante attended St. John's University. While at St. John's in 1964, he played collegiate summer baseball for the Cotuit Kettleers of the Cape Cod Baseball League and was named a league all-star. Galante was selected as the 833rd and final pick of the 1966 Major League Baseball draft by the New York Yankees. He played in the Yankees system from 1966 to 1971, and spent the 1972 and 1973 seasons with the Evansville Triplets, the AAA affiliate of the Milwaukee Brewers.

== Coaching career ==
After his playing career ended, he spent several years as a minor league manager and scout. He was a coach for the Astros from 1985 to 2001 with the exception of 1997, when he worked in the club's front office and then stepped in as manager of the AAA New Orleans Zephyrs when Steve Swisher resigned a few days into the season.

Galante was the acting manager of the Astros for 27 games in 1999, when manager Larry Dierker was sidelined for health reasons. He compiled a record of 13–14. He was a member of the New York Mets coaching staff from 2002 to 2004. He rejoined the Astros front office in 2005.

Craig Biggio credited Galante with assisting him in transitioning from a catcher to a second baseman, a move that extended his career to 20 years in the Majors. In his Hall of Fame address, he asked Galante to stand up for special recognition, saying, "I wouldn't be here without him."

Galante also managed Team Italy in the 2006 World Baseball Classic. He is currently an Astros' scout.

Preceded by Sandy Johnson	Newark Co-Pilots Manager; 1973	Succeeded by John Felske
Preceded by Sandy Johnson	Danville Warriors Manager; 1974	Succeeded by team disbanded
Preceded by Rene Lachemann	Burlington Bees Manager; 1975–1976	Succeeded by Denis Menke
Preceded by first manager	Holyoke Millers Manager; 1977	Succeeded by George Farson
Preceded by Chris Krug	Little Falls Mets Manager; 1979	Succeeded by Dan Monzon
Preceded by Jimmy Johnson	Columbus Astros Manager; 1980–1982	Succeeded by Jack Hiatt
Preceded by Jimmy Johnson	Tucson Toros Manager; 1983–1984	Succeeded by Jimmy Johnson
Preceded by Cot Deal	Houston Astros First Base Coach; 1985–1988	Succeeded by Phil Garner
Preceded by Yogi Berra	Houston Astros Bench Coach; 1989–1993	Succeeded by Julio Linares
Preceded by Tom Spencer	Houston Astros Third Base Coach; 1994–1996	Succeeded by Mike Cubbage
Preceded by Steve Swisher	New Orleans Zephyrs Manager; 1997	Succeeded by John Tamargo
Preceded by Bill Virdon	Houston Astros Bench Coach; 1998–2000	Succeeded by Mike Cubbage
Preceded by Larry Dierker	Houston Astros Manager (interim); 1999	Succeeded by Larry Dierker
Preceded by Steve Swisher	Houston Astros Third Base Coach; 2001	Succeeded by Gene Lamont
Preceded by Cookie Rojas	New York Mets Third Base Coach; 2002–2004	Succeeded by Manny Acta
