= DeMarlo Hale =

American baseball player and coach (born 1961)

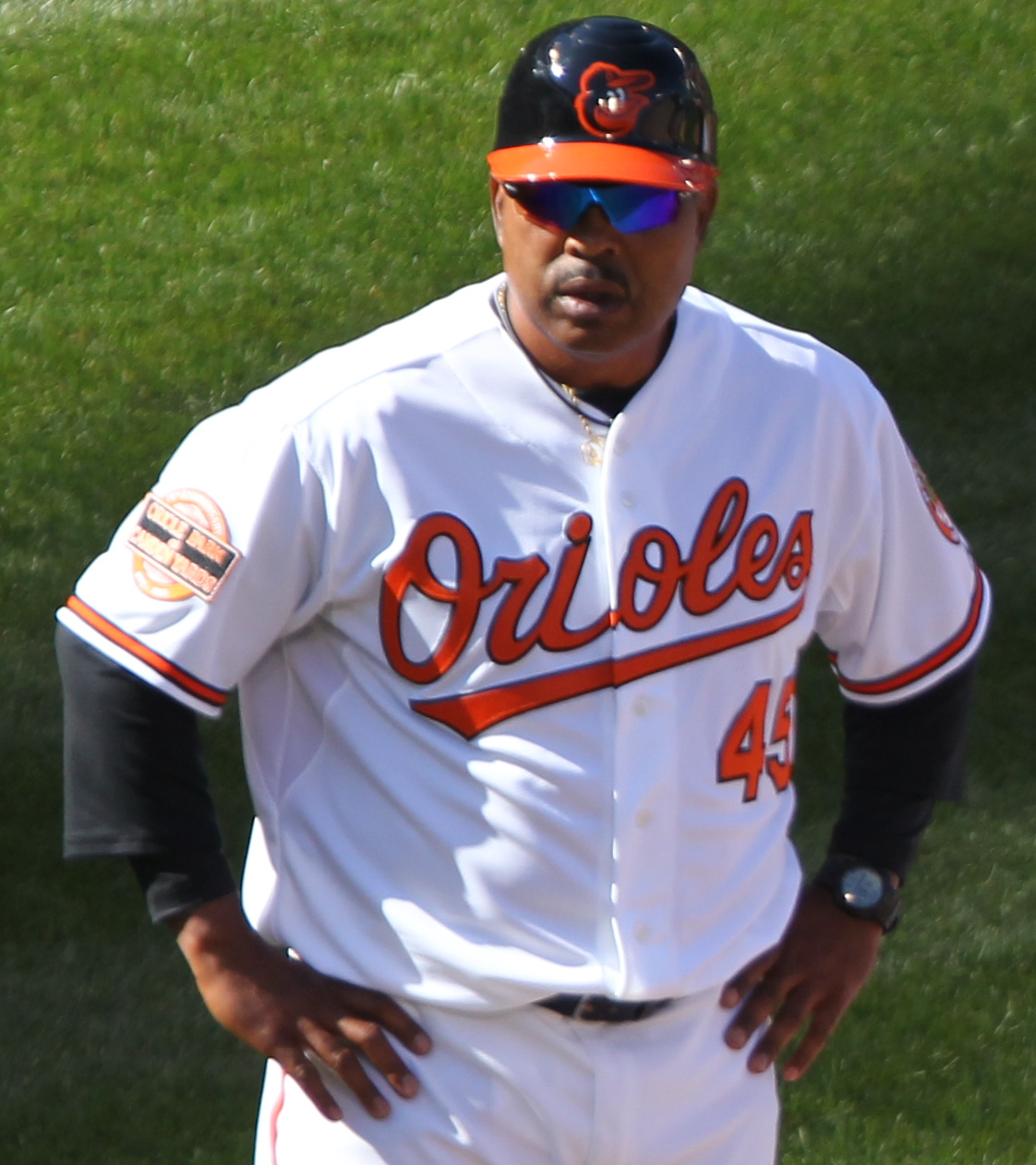
- Hale with the Baltimore Orioles in 2012

Toronto Blue Jays – No. 15
- Associate manager
- Born: July 16, 1961 (age 65); Chicago, Illinois, U.S.
- Bats: Right Throws: Right
- Stats at Baseball Reference

Teams
- As coach: Texas Rangers (2002–2005); Boston Red Sox (2006–2011); Baltimore Orioles (2012); Toronto Blue Jays (2013–2018); Atlanta Braves (2020); Cleveland Indians / Guardians (2021–2023); Toronto Blue Jays (2024–present)

Career highlights and awards
- World Series champion (2007)

DeMarlo Hale (born July 16, 1961) is an American professional baseball coach for the Toronto Blue Jays of Major League Baseball (MLB). Hale played minor league baseball from 1983 to 1988 in the Boston Red Sox and Oakland Athletics organizations.

== Biography ==
Following his playing career, Hale, a graduate of Chicago's CVS High School, worked at the Bucky Dent baseball school in Boca Raton, Florida from 1989 through 1992, when he became a coach for Double-A New Britain in the Eastern League. Hale started his managerial career in 1993 in the Boston farm system with High-A Fort Lauderdale Red Sox in the Florida State League. A year later, he guided Sarasota to the FLS playoffs, and in 1995 he also was a playoff qualifier with Michigan in the Midwest League, being rewarded as the league's Manager of the Year. He spent 1996 with Sarasota and was promoted to Double-A Trenton in 1997, managing the American League team in the Double-A All-Star Game.

Hale guided Trenton to a league-best 92–50 record in 1999. That season, he also coached United States team in the All-Star Futures Game at Fenway Park, and was honored as Minor League Manager of the Year by Baseball America, The Sporting News and USA Today Baseball Weekly, as well as winning Eastern League honor.

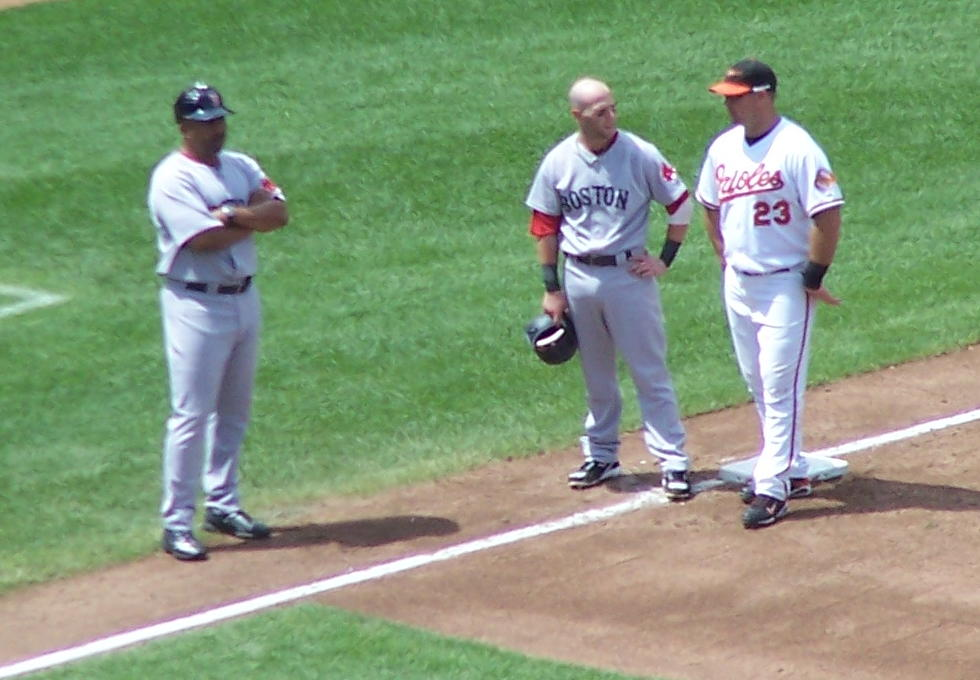
Hale (left) looks on as Dustin Pedroia converses with Ty Wigginton during a pitching change.

From 2000 to 2001, Hale managed for the Texas Rangers Triple-A affiliate Oklahoma RedHawks, as he guided his team to a pair of second-place finishes in the Pacific Coast League East Division, and worked with major league club at spring training. He was promoted as Rangers first base coach and outfield instructor, and continued in those duties through the 2005 season. In a nine-season managerial career, Hale posted a 634–614 record for a .508 winning percentage.

Before the 2006 season, Hale was named by the Boston Red Sox as their third base coach, replacing Dale Sveum. Hale had worked with Red Sox Manager Terry Francona before, when Francona was the Rangers bench coach in 2002. On November 23, 2009, Hale was named the new Red Sox bench coach.

During the 2010 off-season, Hale was rumored to be one of four finalists for the Toronto Blue Jays managerial job, along with Brian Butterfield, John Farrell, and Sandy Alomar Jr. Following the 2011 season, Hale left the Red Sox organization to become the third base coach for the Baltimore Orioles. Following the 2012 season, on November 24, 2012, Hale was named as the new bench coach for the Toronto Blue Jays, replacing Don Wakamatsu. On April 28, 2013, Hale was ejected for the first time in his MLB career by umpire Chris Conroy for arguing Yankees batter Eduardo Nunez's delayed entrance into the batter's box.

Hale joined the Atlanta Braves in 2019, as a minor league coach and special assistant. He was named to the major league coaching staff in July 2020, as Eric Young opted not to travel with the team during the 2020 season, shortened as a result of the COVID-19 pandemic.

Hale was hired as bench coach for the Cleveland Indians on November 23, 2020. On July 29, 2021, Hale was named acting manager for the remainder of the 2021 season after manager Terry Francona went on a health-related leave of absence.

On November 13, 2023, Hale was hired by the Toronto Blue Jays to serve as associate manager under John Schneider.

Preceded by Bobby Jones	Texas Rangers first-base coach 2002–2005	Succeeded by Bobby Jones
Preceded by Dale Sveum	Boston Red Sox third-base coach 2006–2009	Succeeded by Tim Bogar
Preceded by Brad Mills	Boston Red Sox bench coach 2010–2011	Succeeded by Tim Bogar
Preceded by Willie Randolph	Baltimore Orioles third-base coach 2012	Succeeded by Bobby Dickerson
Preceded by Don Wakamatsu	Toronto Blue Jays bench coach 2013–2018	Succeeded by Dave Hudgens
Preceded by Eric Young Sr.	Atlanta Braves first base coach 2020	Succeeded by Eric Young Sr.
Preceded by Brad Mills	Cleveland Indians/Guardians bench coach 2021–2024	Succeeded by Craig Albernaz
