= Paul Bako =

American baseball player (born 1972)

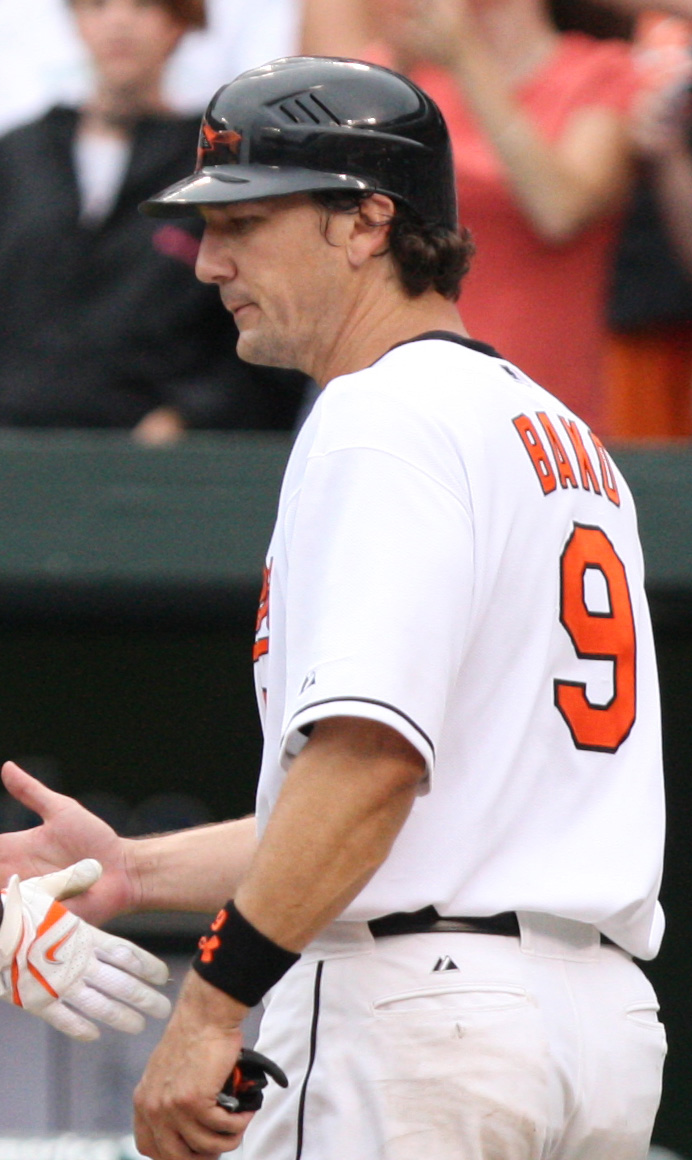
- Bako with the Baltimore Orioles in 2007
- Catcher
- Born: June 20, 1972 (age 54); Lafayette, Louisiana, U.S.
- Batted: Left Threw: Right

MLB debut
- April 30, 1998, for the Detroit Tigers

Last MLB appearance
- October 4, 2009, for the Philadelphia Phillies

MLB statistics
- Batting average: .231
- Home runs: 24
- Runs batted in: 195
- Stats at Baseball Reference

Teams
- Detroit Tigers (1998); Houston Astros (1999–2000); Florida Marlins (2000); Atlanta Braves (2000–2001); Milwaukee Brewers (2002); Chicago Cubs (2003–2004); Los Angeles Dodgers (2005); Kansas City Royals (2006); Baltimore Orioles (2007); Cincinnati Reds (2008); Philadelphia Phillies (2009)

Gabor Paul Bako II (/ˈbɑːkoʊ/; born June 20, 1972) is an American former professional baseball player. A catcher, he is an example of a baseball "journeyman", having played for 11 different teams during his 12-year Major League Baseball (MLB) career. During his playing days, he was listed at 6 feet 3 inches (1.91 m) and 210 pounds (95 kg).

Bako attended high school and college in his home state of Louisiana, winning two conference championships at the University of Southwest Louisiana. After reaching MLB with the American League's Detroit Tigers in 1998, Bako spent seven seasons in the National League, playing with six different teams. He returned to the American League with the Kansas City Royals and Baltimore Orioles, then played for the Cincinnati Reds and the Philadelphia Phillies for one season each.

== Baseball career ==
=== High school and college ===
In 1990, Bako was drafted out of Lafayette High School—who later retired his number 6—with the ninth pick of the sixth round by the Cleveland Indians. He chose not to sign, and attended the University of Southwest Louisiana. In his college career, Bako caught for the Ragin' Cajuns during two consecutive conference championship seasons: 1991 in the American South Conference, when they finished with a 49–20 record, 14th-best among Division I squads; and 1992 in the Sun Belt Conference, when Southwestern Louisiana's pitching staff amassed a 3.50 earned run average, 29th-best in Division I. After the 1992 season, he played collegiate summer baseball with the Wareham Gatemen of the Cape Cod Baseball League. In 1993, he was named to the second team of the all-Sun Belt Conference baseball team, and was selected by the Cincinnati Reds in the fifth round of the 1993 June draft.

=== Minor leagues ===
Bako began his professional career with the Billings Mustangs, a Pioneer Baseball League farm team of the Reds located in Montana. During the 1993 season, Bako amassed a .314 batting average, second-highest on the team that season behind Chris Sexton. Bako walked 22 times, stole 5 bases, and batted in 30 runs, while excelling defensively compared to the other catcher on the team. His fielding percentage was .988, and he posted only four errors that season. He was also named a Pioneer League All-Star.

Bako moved on to the high-A Winston-Salem Spirits in the Carolina League for the 1994 and 1995 seasons. He struggled during the 1994 season, batting only .204 with three home runs and 26 runs batted in (RBIs). 1995 was more successful, with an 81-point boost in batting average (.285), seven home runs and 11 doubles. After the season, Baseball America rated him the top-ranked catching prospect in the Reds farm system.

Bako's 1995 performance earned him a promotion to the Southern League's Chattanooga Lookouts, the Reds AA-level affiliate, for 1996, where he was named a Southern League All-Star. He was second on the team in strikeouts (93) and fifth among regulars with a .294 batting average. He hit a career-high eight home runs during that season, adding 27 doubles and 48 RBIs in 360 at bats. In 1997, playing for the Indianapolis Indians, Bako was a teammate of brothers Aaron and Bret Boone. That year, he batted .243 and matched his previous year's career-high home run total. He had 78 hits in 321 at-bats. Bako's game management earned him a reputation, even in the minor leagues. Brett Tomko, who played with Bako in the minors in 1996 as a member of the Lookouts and in 1997 with Indianapolis, recalled one of their mound conversations:

Bako: Are you really trying out here?
Tomko: What do you mean?
Bako: Because your stuff is horrible today and if you don't try a little harder, you're not going to make it out of this inning.

On November 11, 1997, Bako was traded by the Reds to the Detroit Tigers in an offseason deal that included Donne Wall. After playing 13 games with the Tigers AAA-level affiliate—the Toledo Mud Hens—in 1998, Bako was called up to the Major League club.

=== Major leagues ===
==== 1998–2000 ====
Bako made his major league debut with the Tigers on April 30, 1998, going 0-for-4 with three strikeouts. His first Major League hit, a bases loaded double, came the next day off Bill Swift, when he went 2-for-5 against the Seattle Mariners in a 17–3 Tigers win. He hit his first major league home run on May 15 against the Oakland Athletics; it came off Mike Mohler in the bottom of the sixth inning with two runners (Damion Easley, Joe Randa) on base. He also went 4-for-4 against the New York Yankees on July 21. Bako's rookie season was arguably his most successful: he posted a .272 batting average, hit three home runs, batted in 30 runs, and collected 106 total bases. After the season, the Tigers traded Bako to the Houston Astros in a seven-player deal that included Brad Ausmus.

Because of his last name, Bako gained temporary distinction as one of the Astros' "Killer B's", which included first baseman Jeff Bagwell and second baseman Craig Biggio, two formidable veteran players who helped established the Astros as perennial playoff contenders in the 1990s and 2000s. In fact, journalist Dayn Perry jocosely noted the 1999 Astros, "in pursuit of arcane history, used eight players whose last names began with 'B.'" The eight included Bagwell, Bako, Glen Barker, Derek Bell, Sean Bergman, Lance Berkman, Biggio, and Tim Bogar.

Bako appeared in 73 games for the 1999 Astros; he got at least one hit in his first six games with Houston after beginning the season in the minor leagues, highlighted by a 3-for-4 performance on April 30, the anniversary of his debut. He added another 4-for-4 game to his résumé on July 29 against the Colorado Rockies. Bako hit .256 with two home runs, 17 RBIs, and 16 runs scored in the 1999 season; he was part of Houston's roster for the 1999 National League Division Series, but did not play. After one game for the Astros in 2000, Houston traded Bako to the Florida Marlins. He played his first game for Florida on April 13, going 0-for-4 with a strikeout. Bako played for the Marlins until July 20, batting .242 with 14 RBIs. He was waived on July 21 and claimed by the Atlanta Braves, one of the Marlins' division rivals. He batted .190 with the Braves and played in his first career game at first base in the last two months of the 2000 season.

==== 2001–2004 ====
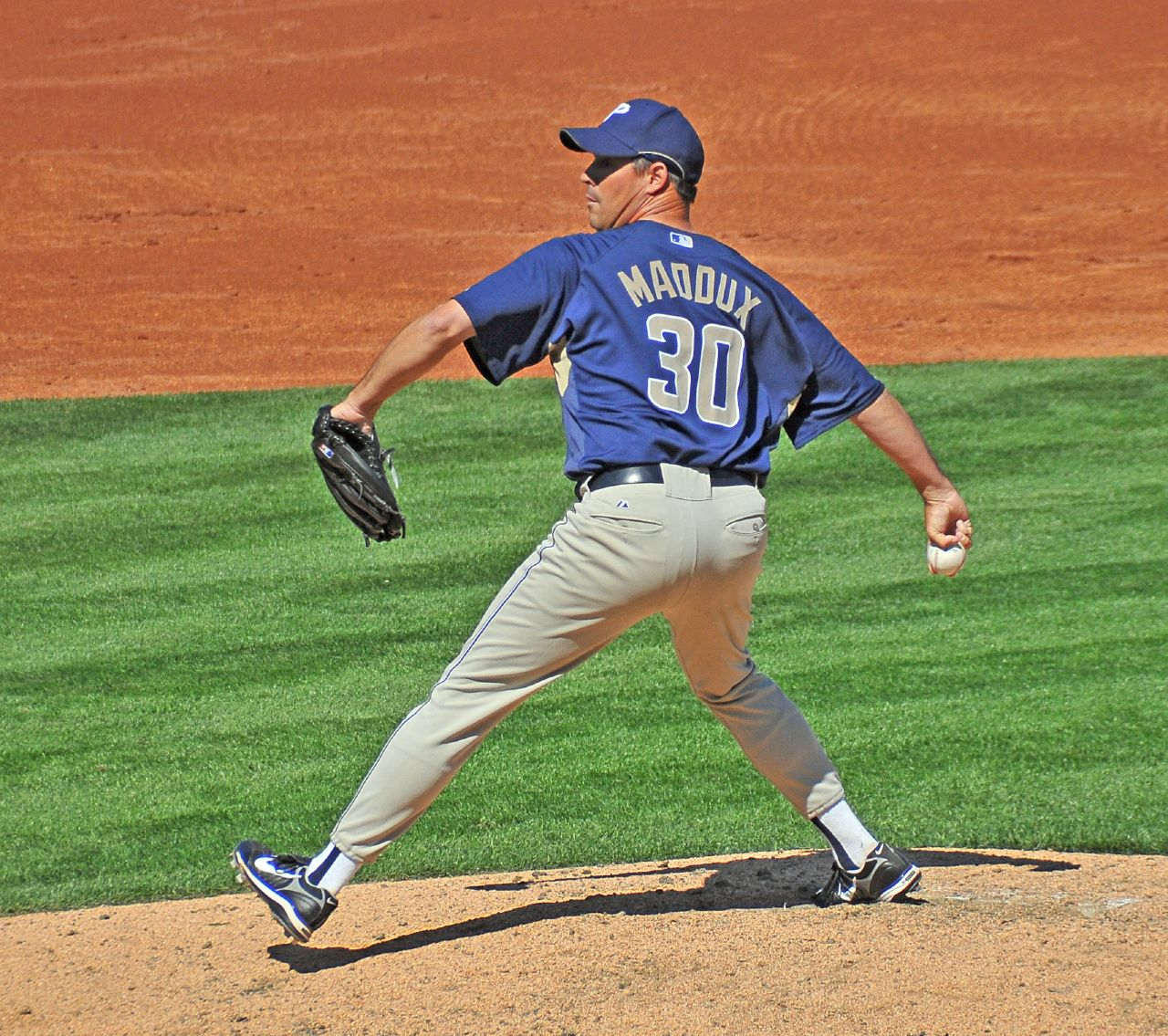
Bako was Greg Maddux' personal catcher during the 2001 season.

Bako remained with the Braves for the 2001 season, where he was the backup to Javy López. He batted .212, amassing the third-highest (20) walk total among Atlanta's bench players and batting in 15 runs. His top performances of the season were a 3-for-4 game against the Montreal Expos in August and a 2-for-3 night—with 2 walks—in October against Florida. Bako appeared in three games during the 2001 National League Division Series (NLDS), his first playoff appearances, and three more during the National League Championship Series (NLCS). In Game 3 of the NLDS, Bako went 2-for-2 with a two-run home run in the second inning; he also batted in a third run on a squeeze bunt in the fourth.

In a trade of catchers, the Braves acquired Henry Blanco from the Milwaukee Brewers in exchange for Bako and José Cabrera. Bako played in 87 games for the Brewers in 2002, his most extensive playing time since his rookie season; behind him, the team used four additional catchers. Bako batted .235 with four home runs for the season. His top performance of the year was against the Minnesota Twins in interleague play; Bako went 3-for-5 with a two-run home run in the top of the fourth inning and a bases-loaded single to drive in a third run.

After the 2002 season, Milwaukee traded Bako to the Chicago Cubs, where he spent two complete seasons; 2003 and 2004 were the only consecutive seasons that Bako spent with the same organization. Over his two years, he backed up Damian Miller and Michael Barrett, and was reunited with former Braves teammate Greg Maddux in 2004. In his first Chicago season, Bako batted .229 with 22 walks and 13 doubles; a 4-for-5 performance in his second game of the year was his best of the season. In that game, he batted three times against the Reds with the bases loaded, notching a triple, two singles and six RBIs. Bako batted only .203 for the Cubs in 2004. He hit one home run and eight doubles, displaying his defense with a .989 fielding percentage. His top performance that year was in the second game of a doubleheader against Florida, when he went 3-for-3 and batted in two runs.

==== 2005–2009 ====
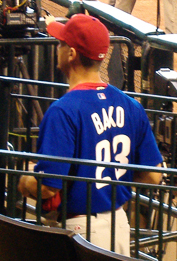
Paul Bako signed with the Phillies in 2009.

As a free agent, Bako signed with the Los Angeles Dodgers for the 2005 season. He batted .250 for the Dodgers in 13 games with two doubles and four RBIs. He backed up both Jason Phillips and Dioner Navarro in 2005, but underwent season-ending surgery on his anterior cruciate ligament in June of that season. The Dodgers granted Bako free agency after the season, and he signed with the Kansas City Royals in December 2005. After beginning the 2006 season in the minor leagues, Bako returned to the majors with the Royals, where he batted .209 backing up John Buck. He played in 60 games with the Baltimore Orioles in 2007, amassing five extra-base hits and batting .205. He tied for the highest total of walks off the Orioles bench and batted in eight runs for the season.

On February 1, 2008, Bako signed a minor league contract with an invitation to spring training with the Cincinnati Reds. At the end of spring training, he was added to the 40-man roster. Though he batted only .217, Bako appeared in a career-high 99 games in 2008, hitting six home runs and notching 35 RBIs. On January 30, 2009, the Chicago Cubs signed Bako to a one-year contract. However, he was unconditionally released near the end of spring training. On May 18, Bako signed a minor league deal with the Philadelphia Phillies, and was called up from the Reading Phillies to the Major League roster on June 9. He became the Phillies only backup catcher when the Phillies waived "folk hero" Chris Coste on July 10; Coste had broken into the big leagues for the first time with Philadelphia at age 33. The next day, Bako came to the plate in the bottom of the ninth inning against Pittsburgh Pirates closer Matt Capps with the score tied, 7–7; the Phillies had been behind by four runs before home runs by Matt Stairs and Ryan Howard tied the game. With the bases loaded, Bako hit a single through the left side of the infield, driving in the winning run (Raúl Ibañez) and sealing the Phillies fourth consecutive victory in a season-high ten-game winning streak. After the acquisition of starting pitcher Cliff Lee, Bako caught all of his first five starts with the Phillies, when Lee posted a 5–0 record and an 0.68 earned run average. Bako said, "With as many strikes as he throws and as many weapons as he has, it's a lot of fun to catch him." Manager Charlie Manuel, however, denied that Bako was scheduled to be Lee's personal catcher, as he had done for Maddux in 2001. "[Bako]'s [sic] not his personal catcher... Of course you guys will write whatever you want to write. If you want him to be his personal catcher, go right ahead. But I'll handle it anyway, so it doesn't matter."

As the 2009 season wore on, regular catcher Carlos Ruiz spent some time recuperating from an injury, allowing Bako expanded playing time near the end of the season. From September 18 to 29, Bako played in all but one of the team's games; his best stretch was from September 24 through September 27, when he went 6-for-13 with two RBI over three games. He finished the year with a .224 batting average. After winning the National League East for the third consecutive year, the Phillies faced the Colorado Rockies in the National League Division Series, the Los Angeles Dodgers in the National League Championship Series, and the New York Yankees in the World Series; Bako did not appear in any games during the postseason. After the 2009 season, Bako filed for free agency; considered retirement, according to teammate Scott Eyre; and did not play during the 2010 season.

== After baseball ==
As of 2011, Bako was an equipment representative for the Marucci Bat Company, based in Baton Rouge, Louisiana. He and former Orioles first baseman David Segui were part-owners of the company.

== Personal life ==
Bako lived in his hometown of Lafayette, Louisiana, during the offseason, with his wife, Laurie, and two children.
