= CBSSports.com =

American sports news website

- Website type: Sports
- Available in: English
- Owner: Skydance Corporation
- Parent: CBS Sports Digital
- Website: www.cbssports.com
- Commercial: Yes
- Registration: Available
- Current status: Active

CBSSports.com (formerly CBS SportsLine.com and SportsLine USA) is an American sports news website operated by CBS Sports Digital, a division of Skydance Corporation. It is the website for CBS' Sports division featuring news, highlights, analysis, and fantasy sports.

== History ==
=== SportsLine ===
In 1997, the service entered into a content-sharing partnership with Viacom. SportsLine also entered into agreements to operate official websites for the NCAA, NFL, and PGA Tour. The company later launched a co-branded website for CBS Sports (then owned by Viacom), CBSSportsLine

=== CBS purchase ===
In August 2004, already holding a 38% stake in the company, Viacom announced that it would acquire the remainder of SportsLine in a deal valued at $46 million ($1.75 per-share) and re-align it with the CBS Sports division (owing to Viacom's ownership of CBS at the time). The company originally operated as a division of CBS Sports, reporting to its president Sean McManus.

=== Fantasy Sports ===
CBSSports.com started producing fantasy sports games in 1997. In 1998, they partnered with Daedalus Worldwide Corporation, a producer of online fantasy sports products. In 1999, they acquired Daedalus Worldwide Corporation.

In August 2015, the SportsLine brand was revived for a new subscription-based site featuring statistics, sports betting and handicapping content. CBS continues to own the site.

== News ==
=== Columnists ===
- Pete Prisco- NFL
- Jason La Canfora- NFL
- Will Brinson- NFL
- Jonathan Jones- NFL
- Matt Norlander- College Basketball
- Gary Parrish- College Basketball
- Jerry Palm- College Sports
- Matt Snyder- MLB
- Dayn Perry- MLB
- Mike Axisa- MLB
- Kyle Porter- Golf
- Jamey Eisenberg- Fantasy Football
- Dave Richard- Fantasy Football
- Scott White- Fantasy Baseball
- Dennis Dodd- College Football

== Freshman of the Year Award ==
Since 2006, the CBSSports.com commenced its Freshman of the Year award. The award is given yearly to the top college football newcomer.

Previous Winners

- 2010 - Marcus Lattimore, South Carolina
- 2009 - Dion Lewis, Pitt
- 2008 - Jacquizz Rodgers, Oregon State
- 2007 - Michael Crabtree, Texas Tech
- 2006 - P.J. Hill, Wisconsin
