= Larry Dierker =

American baseball player and manager (born 1946)

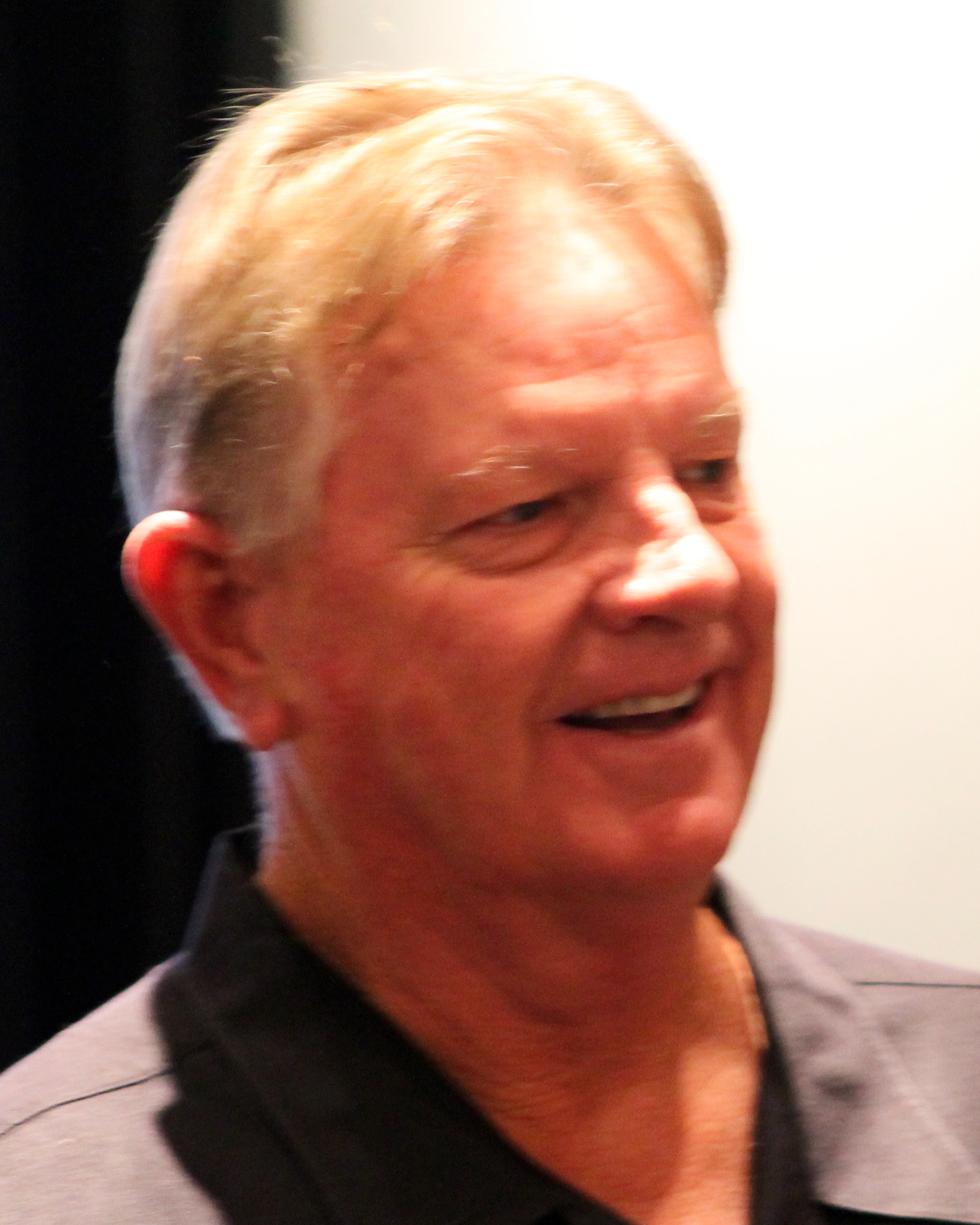
- Dierker in 2014
- Pitcher / Manager
- Born: September 22, 1946 (age 80); Hollywood, California, U.S.
- Batted: Right Threw: Right

MLB debut
- September 22, 1964, for the Houston Colt .45s

Last MLB appearance
- October 1, 1977, for the St. Louis Cardinals

MLB statistics
- Win–loss record: 139–123
- Earned run average: 3.31
- Strikeouts: 1,493
- Managerial record: 435–348
- Winning %: .556
- Stats at Baseball Reference

Teams
- As player: Houston Colt .45s / Astros (1964–1976); St. Louis Cardinals (1977); As manager: Houston Astros (1997–2001)

Career highlights and awards
- 2× All-Star (1969, 1971); Pitched a no-hitter on July 9, 1976; NL Manager of the Year (1998); Houston Astros No. 49 retired; Houston Astros Hall of Fame

Lawrence Edward Dierker (born September 22, 1946) is an American former Major League Baseball (MLB) pitcher, manager, and broadcaster. During a 14-year baseball career as a pitcher, he pitched from 1964 to 1977 for the Houston Colt .45s/Astros and the St. Louis Cardinals.

After many years as a broadcaster for the Astros, he was hired to manage the team in 1997, managing them for five seasons. He was the first Astro manager to lead the team to three consecutive playoff seasons (all through winning the Central division), and in total, he led the Astros to four division titles in five years until he stepped down in 2001.

== Early life and education ==
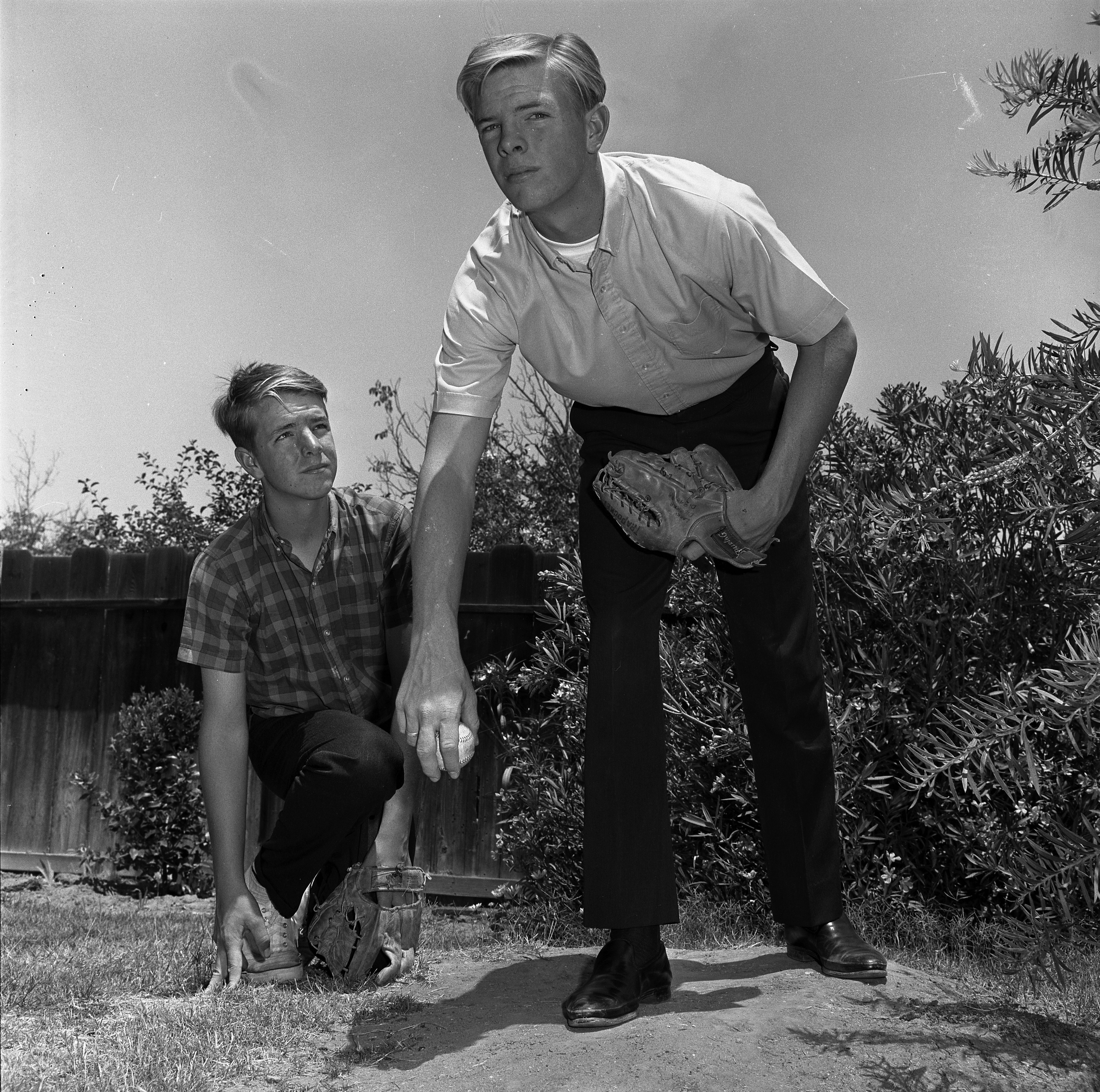
Dierker (right) with his brother, Rick, in 1964

Dierker was born in Hollywood, Los Angeles in California. The Dierkers lived in Reseda near the San Fernando Valley before moving to Woodland Hills (a neighborhood of Los Angeles) when Dierker was in the 7th grade. He honed his baseball in the West Valley Little League before playing on the varsity team of Taft High School. Dierker had a good arm in high school, although he had a losing record as a pitcher. One scout saw potential in him in Tommy Lasorda, who saw ideal mechanics and arm action that seemed right for the majors rather than giving him a bad report.

== Playing career ==
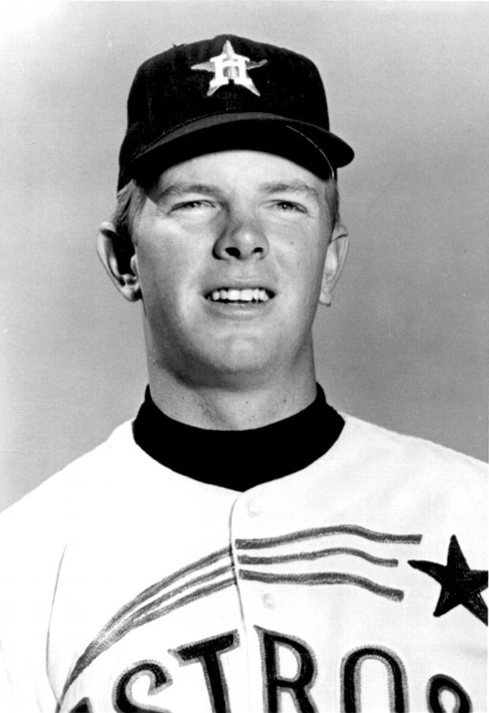
1966 photocard of Dierker with the Houston Astros

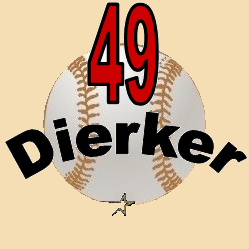
Larry Dierker's number 49 was retired by the Houston Astros in 2002.

Dierker was signed by the Houston Colt .45s at age 17 after winning a bidding war with teams such as the Chicago Cubs to sign him for $55,000. Dierker made his major-league pitching debut on his 18th birthday – and struck out Willie Mays in the first inning. He pitched 2 2/3 innings while allowing four runs (two earned) on five hits, and three walks while having three strikeouts; he was credited with the loss while starting his career with a 6.75 ERA. He pitched in two other games that season, both being the last pitcher for the team, although they were both in losses. In 1965, he appeared in 26 games while garnering a 7–8 record, a 3.50 ERA, and 109 strikeouts in 146.2 innings. The following year, he went 10–8 with a 3.18 ERA and 108 strikeouts in 29 game appearances and 187 innings pitched. He pitched in just 15 games for the 1967 season, though he went 6–5 with a 3.36 ERA and 68 strikeouts in 99 innings. His 1968 season was not much better as he went 12–15 in 32 games with a 3.31 ERA and 161 strikeouts in 233.2 innings. He pitched the Opening Day game for the Astros that season. He pitched a complete game against the Pittsburgh Pirates, allowing four runs on six hits as the Astros pulled a 5–4 win.

In 1969, he became the Astros' first 20-game winner, while compiling a 2.33 earned run average, 20 complete games and 232 strikeouts over 305 innings. He was elected to the National League All-Star team. He went 16–12 the following season in 37 games with a 3.87 ERA and 191 strikeouts in 269.2 innings pitched. In 1971, he went 12–6 in 24 game appearances while having a 2.72 ERA and 91 strikeouts in 159 innings pitched while being named to the All-Star Game, although an elbow injury ended his season after August. In 1972, he went 15–8 while having a 3.40 ERA and 115 strikeouts in 31 game appearances and 214.2 innings. He appeared in 14 games in 1973 due to an injury to his shoulder, going 1–1 while having a 4.33 ERA and 18 strikeouts in 27 innings. Dierker toiled with rotator cuff injuries for the next couple of years. He rebounded the following year, going 11–10 with a 2.90 ERA and 150 strikeouts in 223.2 innings and 33 games. He went 14–16 the next year while having a 4.00 ERA and 127 strikeouts in 232 innings and 34 games. 1976 was his last full season of play and his last with the Astros. He went 13–14 with a 3.69 ERA and 112 strikeouts in 187.2 innings and 28 games. On July 9 of that year, Dierker no-hit the Montreal Expos 6–0 before 12,511 fans at the Astrodome, recording eight strikeouts along the way. On November 23, 1976, he was traded (along with Jerry DaVanon) to the St. Louis Cardinals for Bob Detherage and Joe Ferguson.

The 1977 season was his last season in baseball. He pitched in 11 games while garnering a 2–6 record with a 4.58 ERA and six strikeouts in 39.1 innings. He garnered his last victory on July 1 with a seven-inning, five-hit performance while allowing only one run in a 3–1 win over the Chicago Cubs. His last appearance was a one-inning performance on October 1 against the New York Mets, walking one on no hits and runs. On March 28, 1978, he was released by the Cardinals.

As of 2023, Dierker is the last 17-year-old to make his major league debut.

On May 19, 2002, the Astros honored Dierker, retiring his No. 49 jersey.

== Broadcasting career ==
From 1979 to 1996, Dierker served as a color commentator on the Astros' radio and television broadcasts, a position he returned to in 2004 and 2005. In 1995, Dierker alongside Pete Van Wieren called Games 1–3 of the National League Division Series between the Atlanta Braves and Colorado Rockies for The Baseball Network. The first two games were broadcast on NBC while Game 3 was on ABC. In 2019, he was put onto the Wall of Honor of the press box at Minute Maid Park for his broadcasting.

== Managerial career ==
On October 4, 1996, Dierker was hired as the twelfth manager of the Houston Astros, replacing Terry Collins. Doubts were raised over the potential for a first-year manager replacing a fiery predecessor, but Dierker won the trust of his players as being just one of them. Collins was reportedly dismissed due to disagreements with the two star players in Jeff Bagwell and Craig Biggio. When Dierker was asked how he would approach them, he stated that they would not be a problem under his watch; he believed the statement helped him get the job and that it was false. It was Dierker who moved Biggio to a full-time basis of batting leadoff.

Houston finished first place in four of the five years Dierker managed the team, failing only in 2000 when the Astros placed fourth.

The 1997 team won the National League (NL) Central division, making Dierker the sixth rookie manager to win a division title; it was the first division championship for Houston in eleven years.

The 1998 team, bolstered by a trade for Randy Johnson at the deadline, won 102 games to set a new club record. The mark would not be passed for two decades. That year, Dierker was named National League Manager of the Year.

In 1999, Dierker had a medical scare during a game against the San Diego Padres. Severe headaches had plagued the Houston manager for several days before the June 13 game where Dierker had a grand mal seizure. He required emergency brain surgery for a cavernous angioma caused by a tangle of blood vessels in his brain. The game was suspended with the Astros ahead 4–1; it was not completed until the Padres returned to Houston on July 23 (the Astros won, 4–3). After four weeks of recovery, he returned to the helm of the Astros and guided the team through the duration of the season. The Astros won 97 games and a third consecutive NL Central division title; it was their first division three-peat and the only one in team history until the 2017—2019 era.

Dierker believed strongly in his team's chances for 2000 despite the trades of Mike Hampton, Derek Bell, and Carl Everett. The team blundered early and lost 90 games.

He has the most postseason appearances for a manager without winning a single postseason series (four). Dierker cited a variety of issues that saw the Astros win two postseason games (Game 2 of the 1998 National League Division Series (NLDS) and Game 1 of the 1999 NLDS) in his tenure, ranging from pitching to media exposure while also believing it to be just a stroke of bad luck.

On October 19, 2001, Dierker resigned, which occurred under direct urging by Astros owner Drayton McLane after he was approached by players such as Biggio about the differences they had with Dierker over baseball philosophy; Dierker acknowledged that some players were beginning to get tired of him. He had bristled at the media in the last days of the season, most notably with fan reaction by Astros fans at seeing Barry Bonds tie the season home run record (70) at Minute Maid Park (conversely, Biggio said the fans were "awesome" on that occasion). A question about using Mike Jackson instead of Octavio Dotel in the eighth inning of Game 1 of the subsequent NLDS led to a bit of snapping back that he looked back on with regret. While he had one year left on his contract, he decided to leave, stating, "it would have been hard to create the right atmosphere."

== Later career ==
In 1998, he was inducted into the Texas Sports Hall of Fame. Dierker penned a book entitled This Ain't Brain Surgery, which detailed his baseball career as a pitcher and a manager. He later wrote My Team, in which he ruminated on the greatest players he had been witness to in his years of baseball.

After a short period where Dierker had terminated relations with the club, as of 2015, the Astros' website lists Dierker as employed by them in the role of Special Assistant to the President, Reid Ryan.

In 2017, Dierker and Benjamin Scardello created a podcast called 49's Fastball in which Dierker shares baseball stories he researched going back to the early years of baseball.

The stories include a wide range of subjects and little-known "back story" narratives about players, stadiums, records, promos and unusual events, pitching, openers and debuts, hitting, and all-star games.

SABR Houston honored him by naming a chapter in Dierker's name.

== Personal life ==
Dierker, while pitching, attended the University of California, Santa Barbara and University of Houston.

He was married to Judy Dierker for 42 years until her death in December 2017. He has three children and five grandchildren.

== Managerial records ==
Team	Year	Regular season				Postseason			
Team	Year	Won	Lost	Win %	Finish	Won	Lost	Win %	Result
HOU	1997	84	78	.519	1st in NL Central	0	3	.000	Lost NLDS to ATL
HOU	1998	102	60	.630	1st in NL Central	1	3	.250	Lost NLDS to SD
HOU	1999	84	51	.622	1st in NL Central	1	3	.250	Lost NLDS to ATL
HOU	2000	72	90	.444	4th in NL Central	–	–	–	–
HOU	2001	93	69	.574	1st in NL Central	0	3	.000	Lost NLDS to ATL
Total		435	348	.556		2	12	.143	

== See also ==
- Houston Astros award winners and league leaders
- List of Houston Astros no-hitters
- List of Houston Astros team records
- List of Major League Baseball no-hitters

Awards and achievements
Preceded by Vida Blue, Glenn Abbott, Paul Lindblad and Rollie Fingers	No-hitter pitcher July 9, 1976	Succeeded by Blue Moon Odom and Francisco Barrios
