= Dayn Perry =

American sportswriter (born 1972)

- Born: 1972 (age 53–54); Mississippi, U.S.
- Occupation: Sportswriter
- Years active: 2001–present
- Employer(s): CBSSports.com, Fangraphs.com
- Relatives: Kimberly Perry (niece); Reid Perry (nephew); Neil Perry (nephew)

Dayn Perry (born 1972) is an author and baseball journalist. He was also a special consultant for the San Diego Padres from 2001 to 2003.

== Journalism ==
Perry has written for publications including FanGraphs online journal NotGraphs, ESPN, BaseballProspectus.com, FoxSports.com, Washington Monthly, ESPN The Magazine, Miami Herald, Montreal Gazette, Reason, and The New York Sun.

=== ESPN and Sportstalk ===
Perry began his sportswriting career with sportstalk.com as an intern. When the site was bought out by ESPN, he moved along with the website and continued his writing with ESPN.

=== Baseball Prospectus ===
At Baseball Prospectus he wrote a regular column titled Can of Corn from July 2003 to July 2008. With Baseball Prospectus, in addition to his regular column, Perry contributed to many of the annual books as well as to Baseball Between the Numbers (ISBN 0465005470).

=== Fox Sports ===
Perry joined FoxSports.com as a frequent contributor in 2002 and would later become one of Fox Sports' senior baseball writers (or "experts," along with Ken Rosenthal). He continued to contribute to Fox Sports in a staff that included Rosenthal, Jon Paul Morosi, Tracy Ringolsby, and Bob Klapisch until July 2011.

=== NotGraphs ===
Perry joined NotGraphs in December 2010. Asked about the reasons for moving to NotGraphs full-time he said that he was "tired of straight analysis" and wanted a place to exercise his "boundless" if at times "awful" sense of humor, for the "unbridled whimsy." He was part of a staff that also included Carson Cistulli, Jeremy Blachman and Navin Vaswani.

=== CBS Sports ===
In February 2012, Perry agreed to join CBSSports.com as a writer for the Eye on Baseball blog while continuing to contribute to NotGraphs.

== Books ==
The vast majority of the analytical community has long since disabused itself of the Panglossian notion that anything that matters in baseball can be quantified. Most of us didn't believe that for a second[.]

Winners, p. 3

Perry published his first book Winners: How Good Baseball Teams Become Great Ones (And It's Not the Way You Think) in 2006. Using a numbers-oriented approach, the book attempts to show how successful baseball organizations become successful and what they do to remain so. In a review for The Hardball Times, Dan Fox described the book as "well-written" on a "great topic", applauding Dayn for his "application of performance analysis to the strategies and tactics used over the past quarter century" and "brief portraits of some of the more interesting players to have put on a uniform during that time." Then-general manager Kevin Towers called it "a lively narrative that blends astute analysis with clever storytelling" but Perry himself says its "objectively not a good book" (while admitting that he's his "own worst critic."

Perry published his second book Reggie Jackson: The Life and Thunderous Career of Baseball's Mr. October in 2010. This book, a biography of Hall of Fame baseball player Reggie Jackson, covers Jackson's life from childhood to the major leagues. Steve Lombardi of waswatching.com called it "remarkably well researched" and "very entertaining" and Steve Treder of The Hardball Times called it a "serious and thoughtful volumes displaying highly impressive research," "handsomely presented, top-shelf physical product, with no stinting on any of the extras: wonderful photos aplenty, richly detailed endnotes and indeces [sic]" but notes that "Jackson, while an unquestionably important figure in baseball history, isn’t the sort of book-length protagonist for whom the reader is inclined to root" and that the "strict focus on Jackson alone allows for little examination of whatever the wider implications of his career might be."

== Personal life ==
Perry is a Mississippi native who now lives in Chicago. He received a bachelor's degree in English and a master's degree in creative writing from Mississippi College.

Dayn is the uncle of Kimberly, Neil, and Reid Perry, siblings and members of The Band Perry.

== Works ==
=== Books ===
- Winners: How Good Baseball Teams Become Great Ones (And It's Not the Way You Think). New York: Wiley, 2006. ISBN 0-471-72174-3.
- Reggie Jackson: The Life and Thunderous Career of Baseball's Mr. October. New York: William Morrow, 2010. ISBN 0-06-156238-6.
- The Great Wheel of Mountain Stone: Poems and Small Fictions about Baseball. Kentucky: Finishing Line Press, forthcoming 2027.

=== Selected baseball writing ===
- How the Phillies Pulled it Off (November 2008)
- A Brief Introduction (December 2010)
- The Stages of Wainwright Grief (February 2011)
- Satchel Paige could have been best ever (April, 2011)
- Poem: The Sad Baseball Frog (November 2011)

=== Interviews ===
- March, 2006 – Interview (transcript) with Rich Lederer, Baseball Analysts
- December, 2008 – Interview (transcript) with Tyler Hissey, Scout.com
- May, 2010 – Interview (transcript) with Alex Belth, Bronx Banter
- January, 2011 – Interview with Carson Cistulli, FanGraphs Audio
