= Lance Berkman =

American baseball player (born 1976)

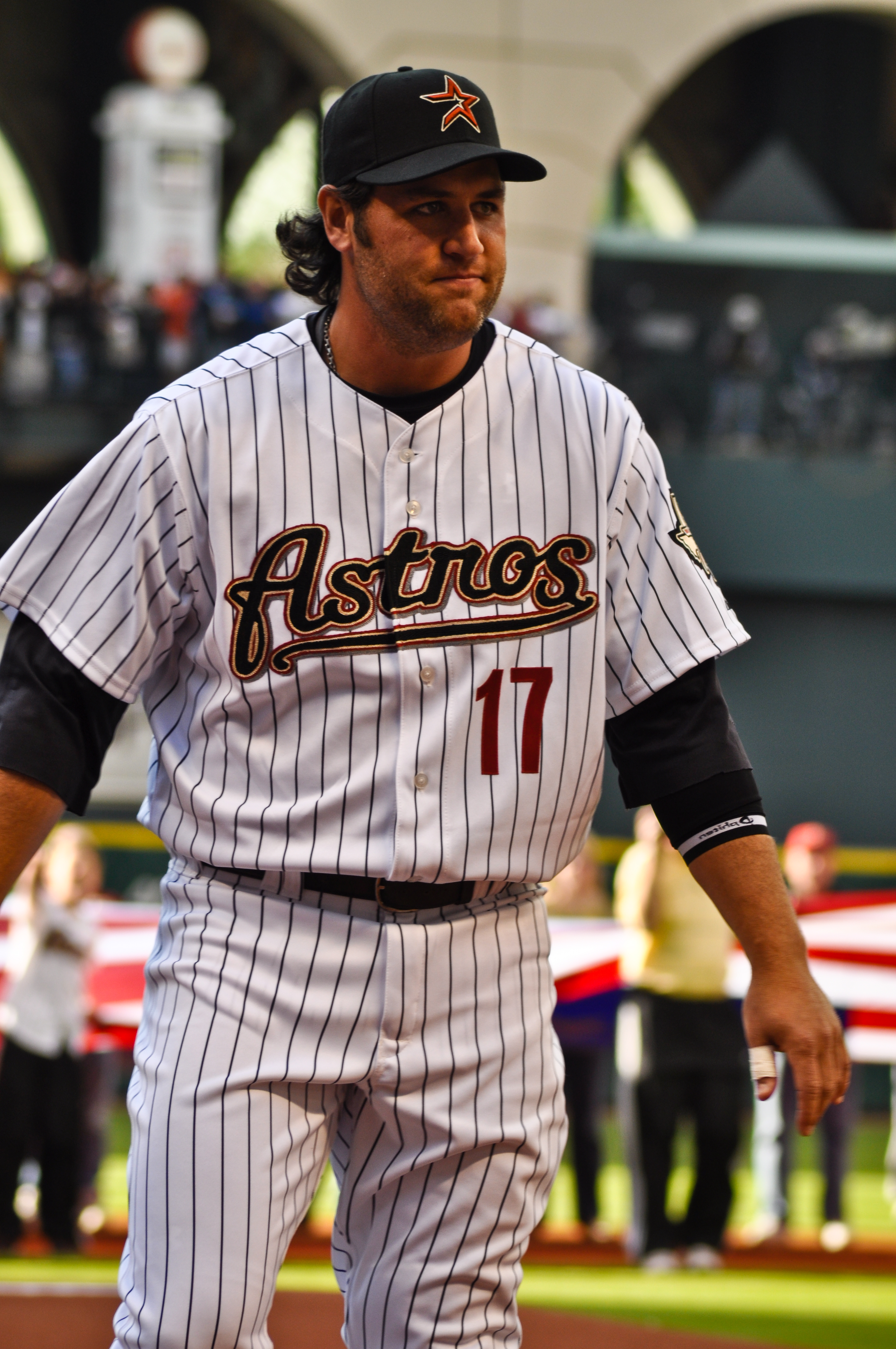
- Berkman with the Houston Astros in 2009
- Outfielder / First baseman
- Born: February 10, 1976 (age 50); Waco, Texas, U.S.
- Batted: Switch Threw: Left

MLB debut
- July 16, 1999, for the Houston Astros

Last MLB appearance
- September 17, 2013, for the Texas Rangers

MLB statistics
- Batting average: .293
- Home runs: 366
- Runs batted in: 1,234
- Stats at Baseball Reference

Teams
- Houston Astros (1999–2010); New York Yankees (2010); St. Louis Cardinals (2011–2012); Texas Rangers (2013)

Career highlights and awards
- 6× All-Star (2001, 2002, 2004, 2006, 2008, 2011); World Series champion (2011); NL Comeback Player of the Year (2011); NL RBI leader (2002); Houston Astros Hall of Fame

William Lance Berkman (born February 10, 1976), nicknamed "Fat Elvis" and "Big Puma", is an American baseball coach and former professional baseball outfielder and first baseman, who is the former head baseball coach of the Houston Christian Huskies. He played 15 seasons in Major League Baseball (MLB) for the Houston Astros, New York Yankees, St. Louis Cardinals and Texas Rangers. Berkman is a six-time MLB All-Star and won a World Series championship and the National League Comeback Player of the Year Award with the Cardinals in 2011. He stands 6 feet 1 inch (1.85 m), and weighs 220 pounds (100 kg). Berkman spent various seasons of his career as a regular at all three outfield positions.

A standout baseball player at Canyon High School, Berkman attended Rice University, where he played college baseball for the Owls. The Astros selected Berkman in the first round of 1997's amateur draft, and he debuted in the major leagues in 1999. He joined the Astros' vaunted "Killer B's" lineup that included Jeff Bagwell and Craig Biggio as all three players were instrumental in the club's playoff success. The Astros traded Berkman to the Yankees at the 2010 trade deadline. He signed with the Cardinals as a free agent for the 2011 and 2012 seasons. Berkman played a key part in the Cardinals winning the 2011 World Series, hitting a game-tying single in the bottom of the tenth inning of Game 6, with the Cardinals just one strike away from elimination. He played the 2013 season with the Rangers before signing a one-day contract with Houston to officially retire as an Astro. In fifteen seasons of baseball, he had an Adjusted On-base plus slugging (OPS+) at 150 or above six times (the baseline average is 100) while drawing 100 walks in a season three times and 100 RBIs in a season six times. His career OPS (.943) ranks 32nd in major league history, and he is one of only four players to draw at least 90 walks in nine consecutive seasons, along with Lou Gehrig, Mickey Mantle, and Joe Morgan.

Active in charity work, Forbes recognized him on their list of "30 most generous celebrities" in 2012. He has led a group called "Berkman's Bunch," an outreach for 50 underprivileged kids to meet Berkman before each Saturday home game for autographs and other gifts. In 2013, he purchased a fire truck and donated it to the City of West, Texas, after the West Fertilizer Company explosion.

== Early life ==
Berkman was born in Waco, Texas, the son of Cynthia Ann (née Thomas) and Larry Gene Berkman. His paternal grandfather, whose family's surname was originally "Björkman", was of Swedish descent. Berkman graduated from Canyon High School in New Braunfels, Texas, in 1994. Berkman's No. 23 jersey was retired by his high school alma mater on Mar 2, 2023 and is displayed on the right-field wall at Canyon High School's baseball field.

== College career ==
Berkman then attended Rice University playing on the Owls baseball team, where he played for the legendary Wayne Graham, and was named a first team All-America by Collegiate Baseball Magazine, Baseball America and The Sporting News. He was invited to visit the White House and dined with President Clinton along with the rest of the Baseball America honorees.

Throughout college, he batted a collective .385 with 67 home runs and 272 RBI. His 41 home runs in 1997 ranked third-most in NCAA history. That year he also made the all-time record book in RBIs (2nd-134), slugging percentage (6th-1.031) and total bases (4th-263) while leading the Rice Owls to their first College World Series appearance.

In 1996, he played collegiate summer baseball with the Wareham Gatemen of the Cape Cod Baseball League (CCBL), where he won the league's Thurman Munson Award for leading all hitters with a .352 batting average. Berkman was named to the CCBL Hall of Fame in 2023.

Berkman returned to Rice in 2014 to finish his degree.

== Professional career ==
=== Draft and minor leagues ===
The Houston Astros of Major League Baseball (MLB) selected Berkman in the first round, with the 16th overall selection, of the 1997 MLB draft. The team assigned him to play with the Kissimmee Cobras, their Class A-Advanced affiliate, of the Florida State League. In 53 games, he hit .293 with 12 home runs and 35 RBI.

In 1998, his second minor league season, the Astros promoted Berkman to the Jackson Generals of the Class AA Texas League. His potential was beginning to show, as he hit .306 with 24 home runs and 89 RBI over 122 games. The Astros granted him a mid-season promotion to the New Orleans Zephyrs of the Class AAA Pacific Coast League. He played 17 games in New Orleans, and 1998 would prove to be his last full season in the minor leagues. In 1999, Berkman was midway through a great season in New Orleans when he was called up to the parent club, the Houston Astros. Prior to the promotion, he had been hitting .323 with 8 home runs and 49 RBI through 64 games.

=== Houston Astros (1999–2010) ===
==== 1999–2004: Early Astros career ====
Throughout his entire high school, college, and minor league career, Berkman had almost exclusively played first base. The Astros, who called him up to the major leagues for the first time in 1999 and already had Jeff Bagwell entrenched at first, shifted Berkman to the outfield so he could regularly hit in the starting lineup. Because of his last name and reputation as a strong hitter, Berkman gained distinction as one of the Astros' "Killer B's" early in his career, which included Bagwell and Craig Biggio, two formidable veteran players who helped established the club as perennial playoff contenders in the 1990s and 2000s. In fact, journalist Dayn Perry jocosely noted in 1999 that the Astros, "in pursuit of arcane history, used eight players whose last names began with 'B.'" The eight included Bagwell, Paul Bako, Glen Barker, Derek Bell, Sean Berry, Berkman, Biggio, and Tim Bogar. After appearing in 34 games in 1999, Houston demoted Berkman to the minor leagues for more seasoning.

The demotion proved brief, however; 31 games into the 2000 season, Houston again promoted Berkman. Moving from left field to right field, he dramatically increased his offensive production by hitting .297 with 21 home runs and 67 RBI, resulting in him becoming a starter for the rest of his career in Houston. Berkman received a single vote in 2000 National League Rookie of the Year voting, tying him for sixth place with Juan Pierre and Chuck Smith. In 2001, Berkman hit .331, fourth in the National League (NL), posted a .430 on-base percentage (OBP) (5th in the NL), and drove in 126 runs (7th in the league). He also scored 110 runs and hit 34 home runs, while his 55 doubles led the league. 2001 also marked his first All-Star appearance (he repeated in 2002, 2004, 2006, and 2008) and he was 5th in Most Valuable Player voting.

2002 saw his batting average drop to .292, although he kept his OBP high at .405. His power output increased also, resulting in 42 home runs. Berkman scored 106 runs and drove in 128, good enough to lead the league. He made his second All-Star appearance and was third in the NL in the Most Valuable Player voting.

In 2003, Berkman's batting average dipped to .288, but his OBP remained high at .412. He hit 25 home runs, and drove in 93 runs, scoring 110. In the field, he played every game in left field, moving to center field once. Berkman also continued his reputation for being colorful and outspoken, advocating for the use of instant replay in games. In a game against the Chicago Cubs at Wrigley Field, fans waved Twinkies at Berkman during the a pitching change in the seventh inning on June 1. He responded by asking for Twinkies to be thrown to his glove, and when two came to him, he proceeded to eat one of them while putting the other in his pocket. He subsequently hit a home run in the next innings earning chants of "Twinkie Power" when he came back to the field in the ninth.

In May 2004, Berkman produced a .785 slugging percentage with 24 RBI, winning the National League Player of the Month honors for the first time in his career. Berkman made the All-Star team, his third All-Star appearance, and placed second in the 2004 Home Run Derby behind Miguel Tejada. He hit the longest home run of the tournament at 497 feet (151 m). Berkman's average for the season increased to .316 from the year before, and his OBP was .450, having walked 127 times. He hit 30 home runs, drove in 106, and scored 104 runs. He also hit 40 doubles and appeared in 160 games, the most in his career for a single season. Defensively, Berkman split 2004 between left and right field. Berkman finished 7th in Most Valuable Player voting.

==== 2005–10 ====
Berkman signed a six-year, $85-million deal in March 2005. He moved to first base early in the 2005 season while Bagwell spent a significant portion of the season injured. Berkman ended the season with 24 home runs and 82 RBIs. He tied for 14th with Bobby Abreu in NL MVP voting.

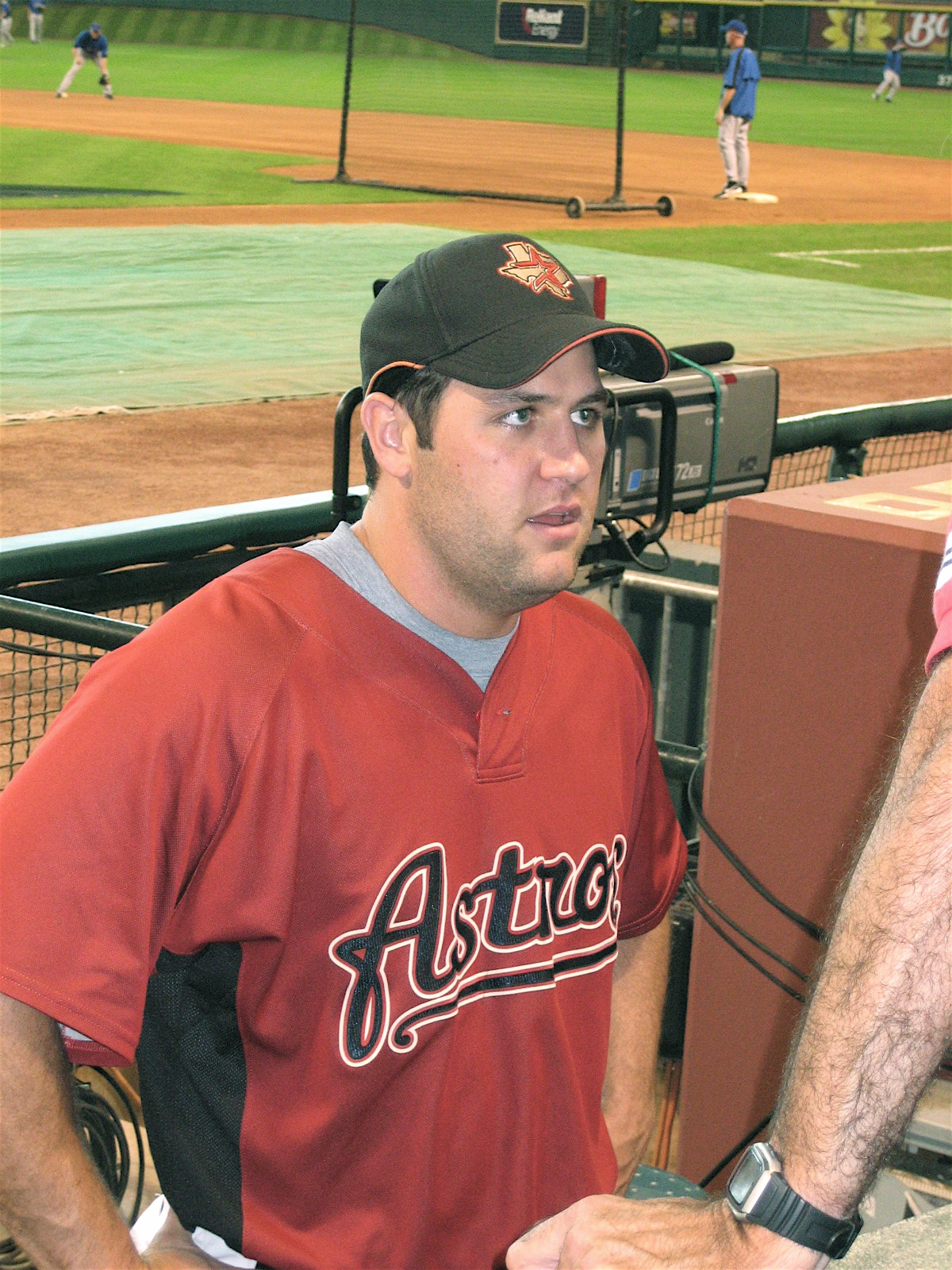
Berkman in 2008

In Game 4 of the 2005 National League Division Series against the Atlanta Braves, Berkman hit a grand slam in the 8th inning. That brought the score to 6–5 in favor of the Braves, but the game was tied in the next inning on a two-out solo home run by Brad Ausmus. The teams then battled for 9 more innings in what became the longest game in Major League Baseball playoff history, with the Astros eventually winning the game (and the series) in the bottom of the 18th inning on a Chris Burke home run. Burke had replaced Berkman as a pinch runner in the 10th. In the 2005 World Series, Berkman's first, the Astros were swept by the Chicago White Sox in four games, though Berkman compiled a .385 average with two doubles. His six RBIs during that series were the most of any of the Astros' hitters.

On Mother's Day, May 14, 2006, Berkman was one of more than 50 hitters who brandished a pink bat to benefit the Breast Cancer Foundation. On September 13, 2006, Berkman became only the second switch hitter in Major League history to hit 40 or more homers in multiple seasons, with Mickey Mantle being the first.

During the 2006 season, Berkman hit 45 home runs and had 136 RBI. He broke the Astros' single season record for RBI, previously set by Bagwell in 1997 with 135. He also had a .315 batting average, an on-base percentage of .420, as well as a slugging percentage of .621. He also hit a career high 5 home runs from the right side of the plate. He finished third in the MVP voting behind Ryan Howard and Albert Pujols.

Berkman started the 2007 season in a bit of a slump, batting .261, well below his career average, but rebounded for a strong second half of the season. Berkman finished the 2007 season with a .278 batting average, 34 home runs and 102 RBIs, along with 7 stolen bases.

Berkman started the 2008 season batting well above .385 through April, won the NL Player of the Month in May and two separate Player of the Week awards, one which he went 29–32 (batted .906) with 6 home runs, including a McCovey Cove splash landing. At the All-Star break, he was in the NL's top four in batting average, with 22 home runs, and was on pace for 130+ RBIs. However, despite the rest of the team picking up steam behind the likes of Roy Oswalt, Wandy Rodríguez, Hunter Pence, and Ty Wigginton's rebound second half, Berkman's individual performance dipped significantly, and by season's end, he batted .312, with 29 home runs (7 of which were right-handed, setting a new career high), 106 RBI, and an NL-leading 46 doubles. Berkman was fifth in the voting for the 2008 NL MVP award, behind Albert Pujols, Ryan Howard, Ryan Braun, and Manny Ramirez.

Berkman hit his 300th home run against Arizona Diamondbacks starter Jon Garland on June 13, 2009.

=== New York Yankees (2010) ===
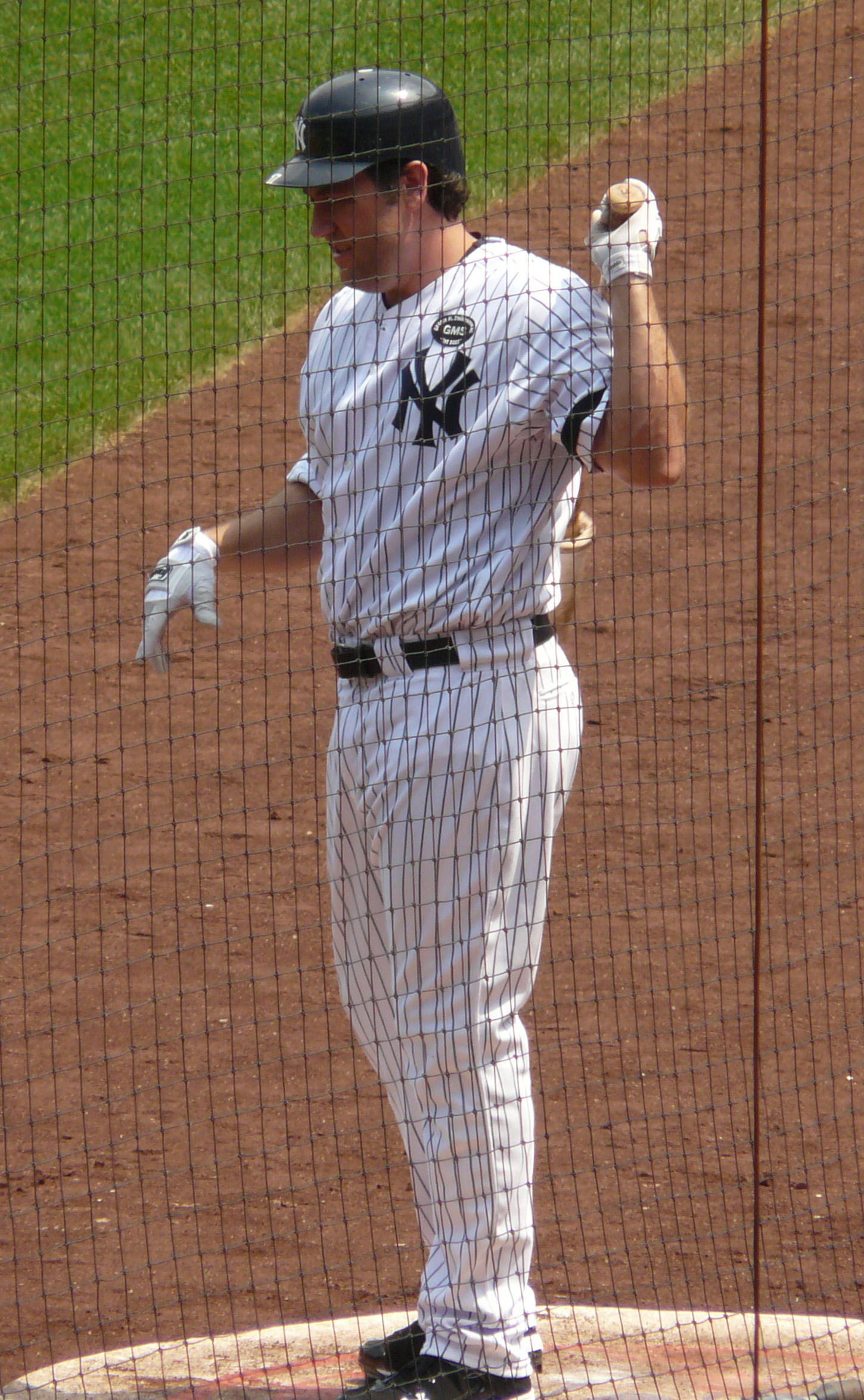
Berkman during his tenure with the New York Yankees in 2010

On July 31, 2010, Berkman was traded to the New York Yankees for minor leaguers Jimmy Paredes and Mark Melancon. He served as both a designated hitter and backup first baseman during his tenure with New York. During the 2010 ALCS, Berkman served first base for the rest of the post-season when Mark Teixeira went on the disabled list due to a hamstring injury. The Yankees eventually lost the ALCS to the Texas Rangers in 6 games.

The Yankees announced on October 27 that the club declined to exercise their option for Berkman for 2011.

=== St. Louis Cardinals (2011–2012) ===
==== 2011 season: Comeback and World Series championship ====
Berkman was under contract with the Cardinals for the 2011 and 2012 seasons. 2011 became a comeback year for Berkman, as he was one of the team leaders in batting average, home runs and RBI. He was named the NL Comeback Player of the Year. Berkman also finished 7th in NL MVP voting, the sixth and final time he would finish inside the top ten in MVP voting.

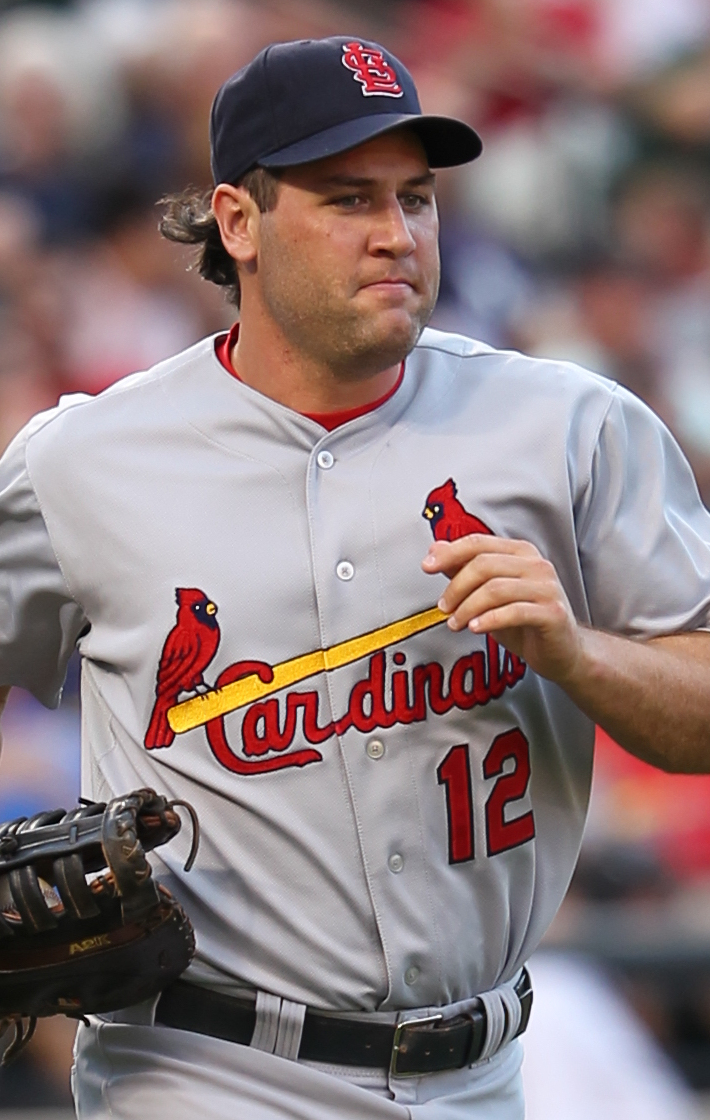
Berkman playing for the St. Louis Cardinals in 2011

Berkman made key contributions in Game 6 of the 2011 World Series against the Texas Rangers. He hit his first home run in a World Series game in the first inning and in the ninth, with St. Louis down to their final strike before elimination, Berkman was driven home followed by Albert Pujols after a game-tying 2-run triple by David Freese. After Texas scored two runs in the top of the tenth and Ryan Theriot hit a run-scoring groundout, Berkman hit a two-out two-strike RBI single scoring Jon Jay to tie the game. Berkman won his first World Series championship as the Cardinals defeated the Texas Rangers in the series in 7 games.

==== 2012 season ====
On April 22, 2012, Berkman was placed on the disabled list due to a calf injury. On May 21, 2012, Berkman was again placed on the disabled list due to right knee injury. An MRI revealed that there was significant cartilage damage to both sides of the knee and a torn meniscus, requiring arthroscopic surgery. Berkman returned on July 14, 2012. He was then placed on the 15-day disabled list on August 3, 2012, due to knee inflammation. It was the third time Berkman went on the DL in the 2012 season. On September 10, 2012, he was again put on the disabled list after having to go for a secondary meniscus surgery in the same knee. On October, 3rd, 2012, Berkman had his last at bat as a Cardinal. He spent the 2012 postseason on the physically unable to perform list as the Cardinals won the 2012 NLDS against the Washington Nationals but lost the 2012 NLCS against the San Francisco Giants.

=== Texas Rangers ===
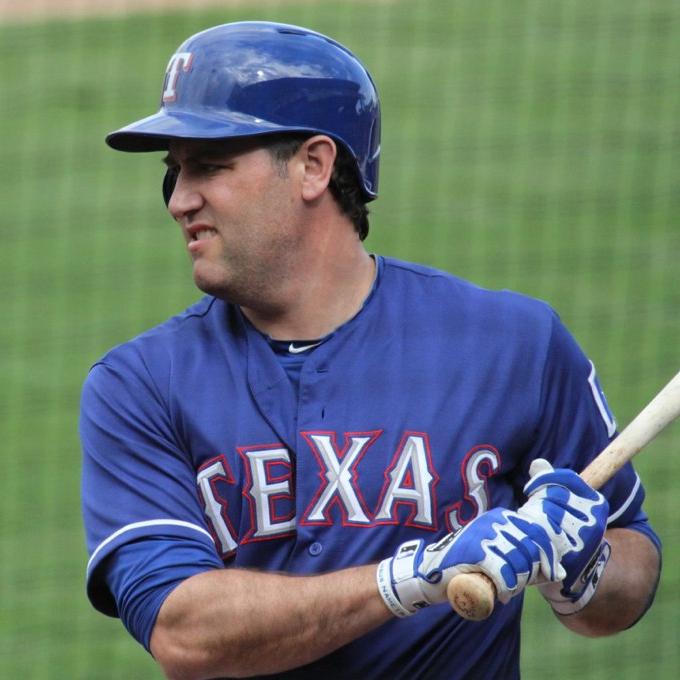
Berkman with the Texas Rangers in 2013 spring training

On January 5, 2013, Berkman agreed to a one-year contract with the Texas Rangers for approximately $10 million. In 73 games, Berkman hit .242 with six home runs and 34 RBIs in 256 at bats. On October 31, the Rangers declined his option, which made him a free agent. On January 29, 2014, he decided to retire. Berkman, along with former teammate Roy Oswalt signed a one-day contract with Houston to officially retire as a member of the Astros on April 5, 2014.

=== Career statistics ===
In 1,879 games over 15 seasons, Berkman posted a .293 batting average (1,905-for-6,491) with 1,146 runs, 422 doubles, 30 triples, 366 home runs, 1,234 RBI, 86 stolen bases, 1,201 bases on balls, .406 on-base percentage and .537 slugging percentage. He finished his career with a .991 fielding percentage playing at all three outfield positions and first base. In 52 postseason games, he hit .317 (59-for-186) with 38 runs, 11 doubles, 1 triple, 9 home runs, 41 RBI and 31 walks.

== Coaching career ==
Lance Berkman
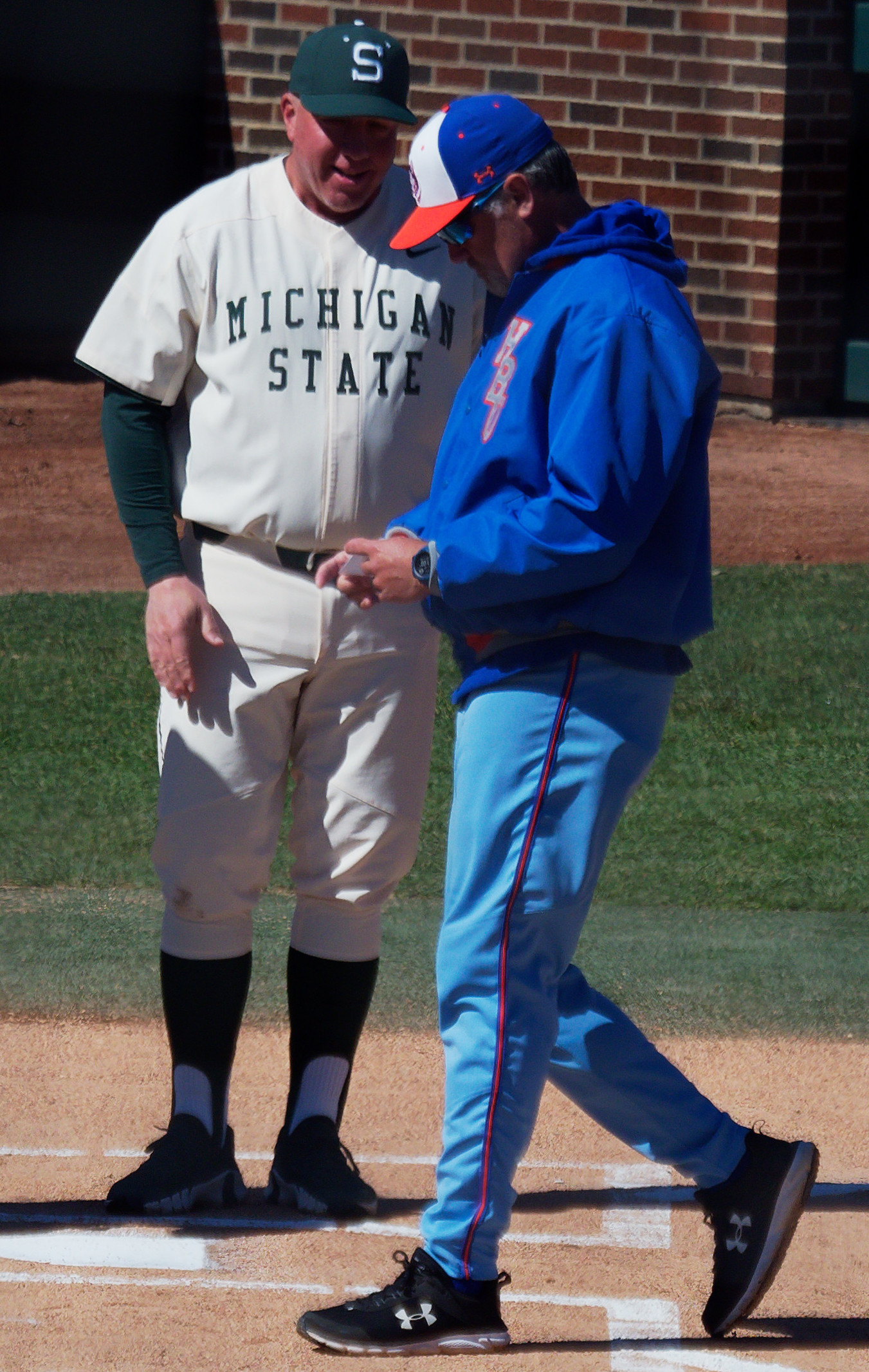
- Berkman (right) as Houston Christian head coach with Michigan State coach Jake Boss before a 2022 game

Coaching career (HC unless noted)
- 2016–2019: Second Baptist
- 2020–2021: St. Thomas (assistant)
- 2022–2024: Houston Christian

Head coaching record
- Overall: 47–104 (.311) (college)

In 2009, Berkman stated that after his major league career he would like to coach baseball at the University of Texas at Austin even though he attended Rice University. Since he didn't finish his degree at Rice, he would need to return to school and complete three more semesters to earn a business degree with a minor in sports management. He hypothesized then that "I know [Texas Coach Augie] Garrido's going to coach four or five more years. I figured that might dovetail nicely with the end of my career." With Berkman's retirement in 2014, however, it is at his alma mater, Rice, that the former Owl has spent time assisting young hitters. Rice coach Wayne Graham has made it clear that Rice would be interested, stating that "[i]t sounds like he wants to coach. Hopefully at one time or another it will be here. We’ll manage to always find a place for him."

Beginning in 2015, Berkman served as the head baseball coach at Second Baptist School in Houston, Texas, along with his former Astros teammate Andy Pettitte serving as assistant coach. Berkman and Pettitte led Second Baptist to a Tapps State Title in 2016.

Berkman was eligible for the Baseball Hall of Fame in 2019. He received 5 votes, or 1.4%, which is less than 5% threshold and became thus ineligible for further consideration.

He was an assistant manager for the University of St. Thomas baseball team during the 2021 season.

On May 31, 2021, Berkman was named the head baseball coach of the Houston Christian Huskies. On May 24, 2024, Berkman announced he was stepping down from his head coaching position at HCU.

=== Head coaching record ===
Record table
Season	Team	Overall	Conference	Standing	Postseason
Houston Baptist/Christian Huskies (Southland Conference) (2022–2024)
2022	Houston Baptist	18–36	11–13	6th	
2023	Houston Christian	11–37	7–16	9th	
2024	Houston Christian	18–31	9–15	9th	
Houston Baptist:		47–104 (.311)	27–44 (.380)		
Total:		47–104 (.311)			
National champion Postseason invitational champion Conference regular season champion Conference regular season and conference tournament champion Division regular season champion Division regular season and conference tournament champion Conference tournament champion

== Career achievements ==
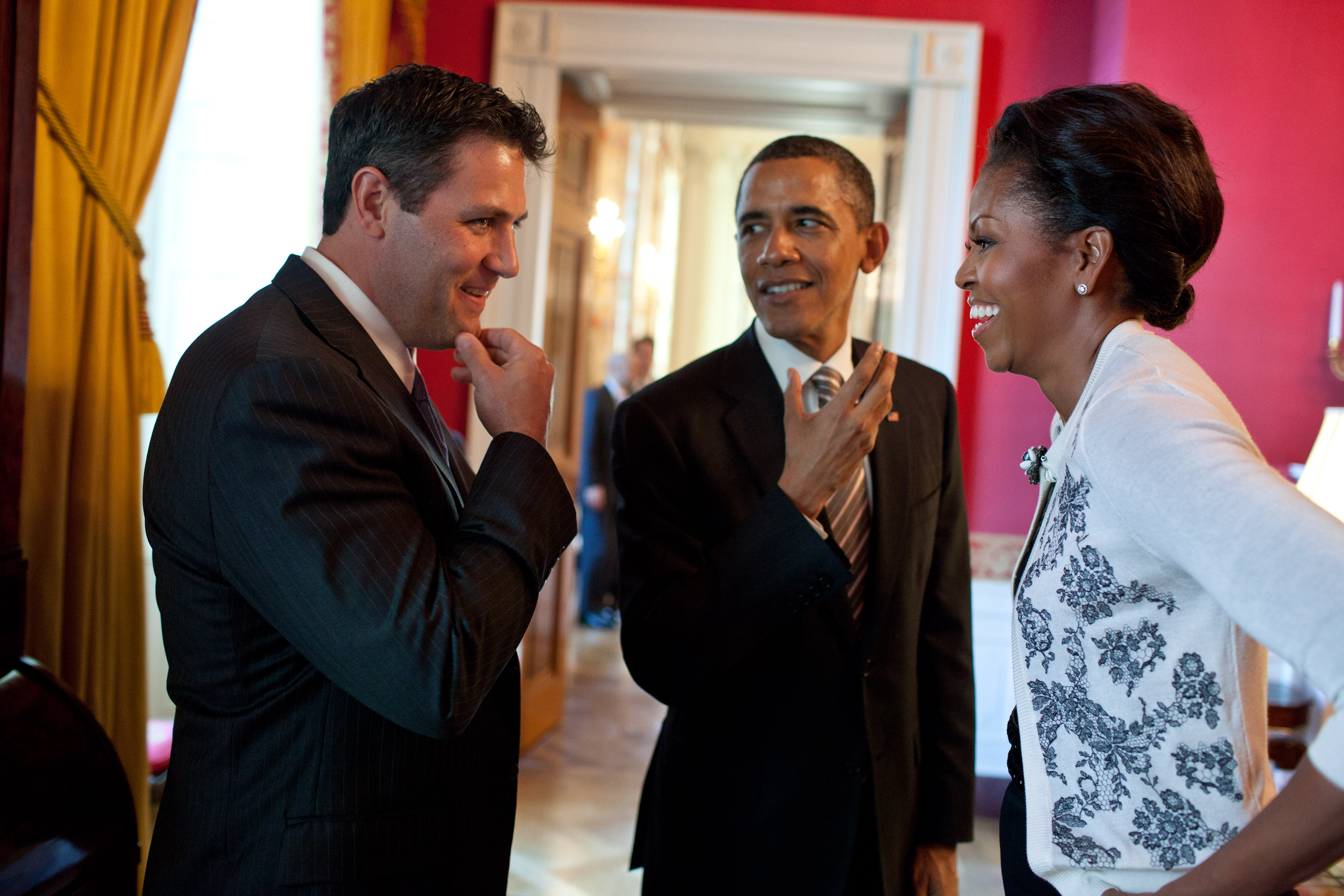
Berkman (left) with President Barack (center) and First Lady Michelle Obama at the White House in 2012

Championships earned or shared
Title	Times	Dates	Ref
National League champion	2	2005, 2011	
World Series champion	1	2011	

Honors received
Title	Date	Ref
Texas Sports Hall of Fame inductee	2009	

Awards

- Darryl Kile Good Guy Award (2011)
- GIBBY/This Year in Baseball Award for Comeback Player of the Year (2011)
- 6× MLB All-Star (2001, 2002, 2004, 2006, 2008, 2011)
- National League Comeback Player of the Year (2011)
- 2× National League Player of the Month (May 2004, and May 2008).
- 4× National League Player of the Week for April 21–27 and May 5–11, 2008; April 11–17 and April 25 – May 1, 2011.
- Players Choice Award for Comeback Player of the Year (2011)
- The Sporting News Comeback Player of the Year Award (2011)

Statistical achievements

Notes: Per Baseball-Reference.com.

National League statistical leader
Category	Times	Dates
Doubles leader	2	2001, 2008
Runs batted in leader	1	2002

National League top-ten ranking
Category	Times	Seasons	Category	Times	Seasons
Adjusted on-base plus slugging	6	2001, 2004−06, 2008, 2011	Home runs	4	2002, 2006, 2007, 2011
Bases on balls	10	2001−09, 2011	On-base percentage	9	2001−06, 2008, 2009, 2011
Batting average	4	2001, 2004, 2006, 2008	On-base plus slugging percentage	7	2006–08, 2010–13
			Runs batted in	5	2001, 2002, 2004, 2006, 2008
Doubles	2	2001, 2008	Runs scored	3	2002, 2003, 2008
Extra base hits	4	2001, 2002, 2004, 2008	Slugging percentage	5	2001, 2002, 2006, 2008, 2011
Games played	3	2002, 2004, 2008			
Hits	1	2001	Times on base	7	2001−04, 2006, 2008, 2011
			Total bases	4	2001, 2002, 2006, 2008

- Hit better than .300 five times, with a career high batting average of .331 in 2001.
- 43rd all-time in on-base percentage (.406).
- 40th all-time in slugging percentage (.537).
- 28th all-time in OPS (.943).
- National League record holder for most single season RBIs (136) as a switch hitter.
- National League record holder for most single season Home Runs (45) as a switch hitter (tied with Chipper Jones).
- Record holder for most home runs in day games at Minute Maid Park in Houston (147).
- Record holder for most career home runs at the Great American Ball Park in Cincinnati for an opposing player (23).
- Record holder for the date with home runs in most consecutive years: September 21, 2001 – 2007 (tied with Lou Gehrig, June 8, 1932 – 1938).

== Personal life ==
Berkman and his wife, Cara, live in Houston with their four daughters. Berkman has been very outspoken about his Christian beliefs throughout his career. Berkman uses his position as a professional athlete to discuss his religious beliefs with others. He told The 700 Club in May 2007: "What you’re running after, what you’re trying to find will not provide you with any lasting fulfillment. The only place you can find that is Jesus Christ. It's in the service of God you’ll find that lasting fulfillment."

In 2001, Berkman began leading a charity called "Berkman's Bunch" where 50 underprivileged kids could meet Berkman before each Saturday home game for autographs and other gifts. In April 2012, Forbes named Berkman one of the 30 most generous celebrities as he and his wife had donated $2,412,245 to a foundation they established called To The Lord's Fund.

In July 2013, Berkman purchased a fire truck and had it overhauled by the City of Arlington. He then donated it to the City of West, Texas, in the wake of the West Fertilizer Company explosion that took place earlier in the year. The fire truck is white with a red Maltese cross on the doors and the name Berkman over the cross with his number "17" encircled within the cross.

Berkman filmed an advertisement against the Houston Equal Rights Ordinance, which was aimed at protecting LGBT individuals from discrimination. The ordinance sought to ban discrimination on a variety of levels, including sex, race, color, ethnicity and other classifications. Despite the wording of the ordinance, HERO's opponents including Berkman, instead honed in on the sexual orientation and gender identity protections. Berkman took to the airwaves to repeat a popular stance of HERO's critics, arguing that the law would allow male predators dressed in drag to enter women's bathrooms, rather than open public accommodations to transgender people. Berkman's appearance garnered criticism from many, including former Minnesota Vikings punter Chris Kluwe. The controversy flared when Houston Mayor Annise Parker stated of Berkman, "That someone who made his name in our city would inject himself into this debate by taking to the airwaves to discredit an effort to ban discrimination in all forms did upset me. This ordinance protects all Houstonians and his remarks diminished it to something trivial." The ordinance was rejected by Houston voters in a ballot initiative in November 2015.

== Nicknames ==
He is most popularly known as "Fat Elvis" and "The Big Puma." Before the 2006 season started, in an interview with a local Houston sports radio station, Lance joked "I'm more like a puma so I'm not sure why people call me Fat Elvis." The show's hosts, John Granato and Lance Zierlein, ran with the moniker and Houston fans and media latched onto "The Big Puma." When questioned further, Berkman explained the nickname is simply logical. "Agile, athletic, sleek ... all the things that describe my game", he said, somewhat tongue-in-cheek. With his outstanding start in 2008, this nickname also became known on a national level. That same year, a Lance Berkman fan club calling themselves "The Little Pumas" emerged. During Berkman's long tenure with the Astros, they could be seen wearing puma costumes and foam puma paws at most Astros home games near the Conoco Pump in left-center field. The group became relatively well known among Astros fans, as they were shown often during Astros broadcasts on Fox Sports Houston.

Berkman was also one of the Astros' "Killer B's" in the mid-2000s, along with Jeff Bagwell and Craig Biggio.

== See also ==
- Houston Astros award winners and league leaders
- List of Houston Astros team records
- List of Major League Baseball annual doubles leaders
- List of Major League Baseball career bases on balls leaders
- List of Major League Baseball career home run leaders
- List of Major League Baseball career on-base percentage leaders
- List of Major League Baseball career OPS leaders
- List of Major League Baseball career runs batted in leaders
- List of Major League Baseball career runs scored leaders
- List of Major League Baseball career slugging percentage leaders
- List of Rice University people
- St. Louis Cardinals award winners and league leaders

Awards and achievements
Preceded by Barry Bonds; Chase Utley	National League Player of the Month; May 2004; May 2008	Succeeded by Jim Thome; Hanley Ramírez
