= Marriott Marquis Houston =

Hotel in Houston, Texas

Coordinates: 29.7543°N 95.3579°W

- Interactive map of the Marriott Marquis Houston area
- Hotel chain: Marriott Marquis

General information
- Location: United States, 1777 Walker Street; Houston, Texas 77010
- Opening: December 26, 2016
- Cost: $335 million
- Management: Marriott International

Height
- Height: 400 feet (120 m)

Technical details
- Floor count: 30
- Floor area: 166,000 sq ft (15,400 m^{2})

Design and construction
- Architect: Morris Architects
- Developer: RIDA Development

Other information
- Number of rooms: 1,000
- Number of restaurants: 6

Website
- http://www.marriott.com/hotels/travel/houmq-marriott-marquis-houston/

The Marriott Marquis Houston is a 1000-room Marriott hotel in Houston, Texas. It is the second large hotel located near the George R. Brown Convention Center, to which it is connected by a pedestrian sky bridge. It includes six restaurants and a 40,000-square-foot ballroom, the largest in Houston. The hotel is the sixth Marriott Marquis Hotel. It is most famous for the Texas-shaped lazy river located on the sixth floor rooftop deck.

The Marriott Marquis Houston was developed in partnership with RIDA Development. RIDA Development also is the prime interest owner. RIDA Development Corporation is a full-service real estate organization that has created and invested in innovative and economically successful office, residential, industrial, hospitality and retail developments for more than forty years. RIDA Development's corporate headquarters is located in Houston, with regional offices in Orlando, Denver and Warsaw. These centralized locations allow RIDA to intimately oversee its projects in the US as well as Europe. Among RIDA's strategic relationships is a longstanding partnership with Ares Management with whom they have co-invested in over 4 billion dollars' worth of investments and development on three continents.

The Marriott Marquis Houston contains numerous works of art from both local and nationally known artists. A portrait made of spent shell casings of David Mitzner, the founder of RIDA Development, is on display.

== See also ==
- Biggio's
