= 2015 Baseball Hall of Fame balloting =

Elections to the Baseball Hall of Fame

National Baseball

Hall of Fame and Museum
- New inductees: 4
- via BBWAA: 4
- Total inductees: 310
- Induction date: July 26, 2015

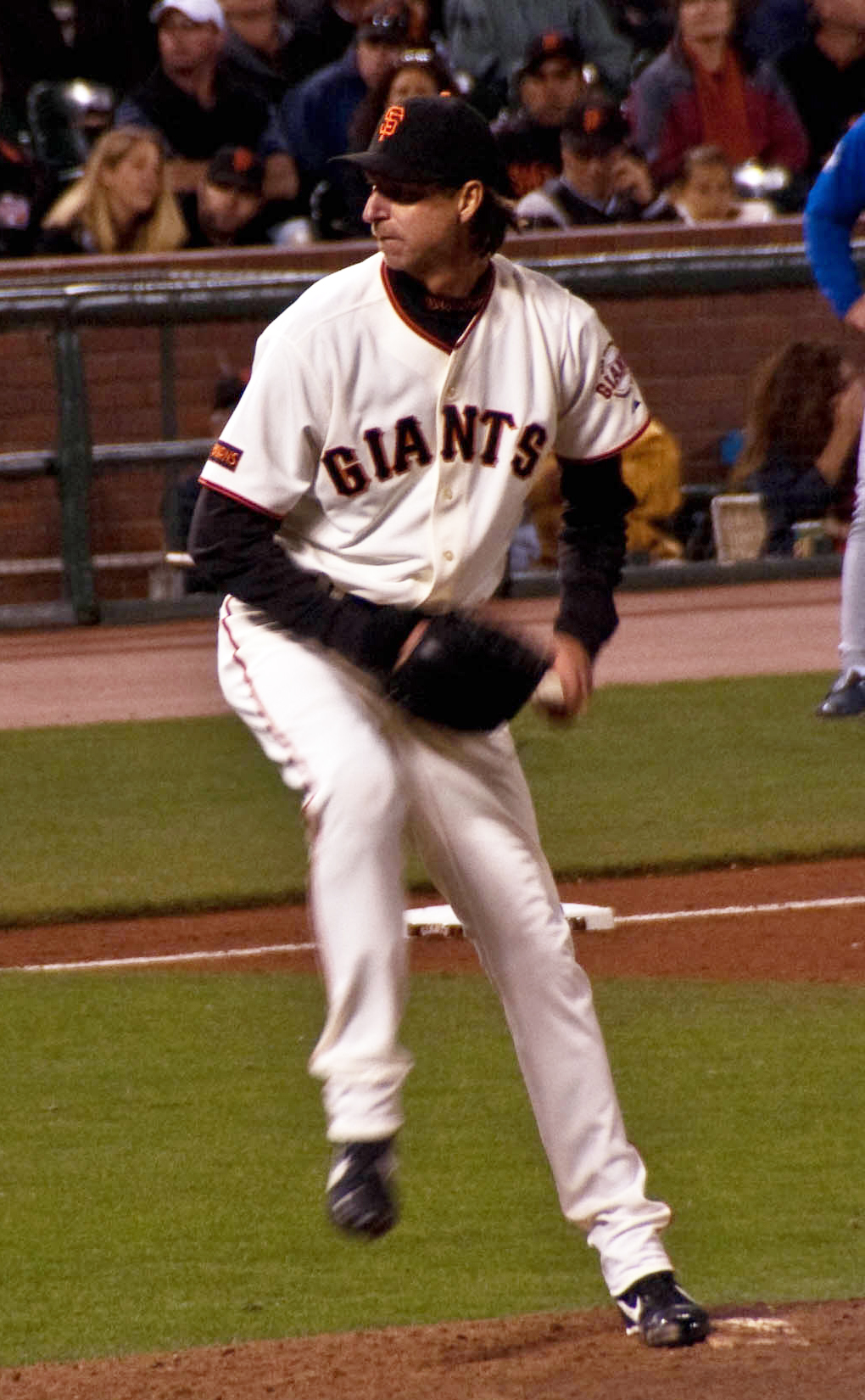
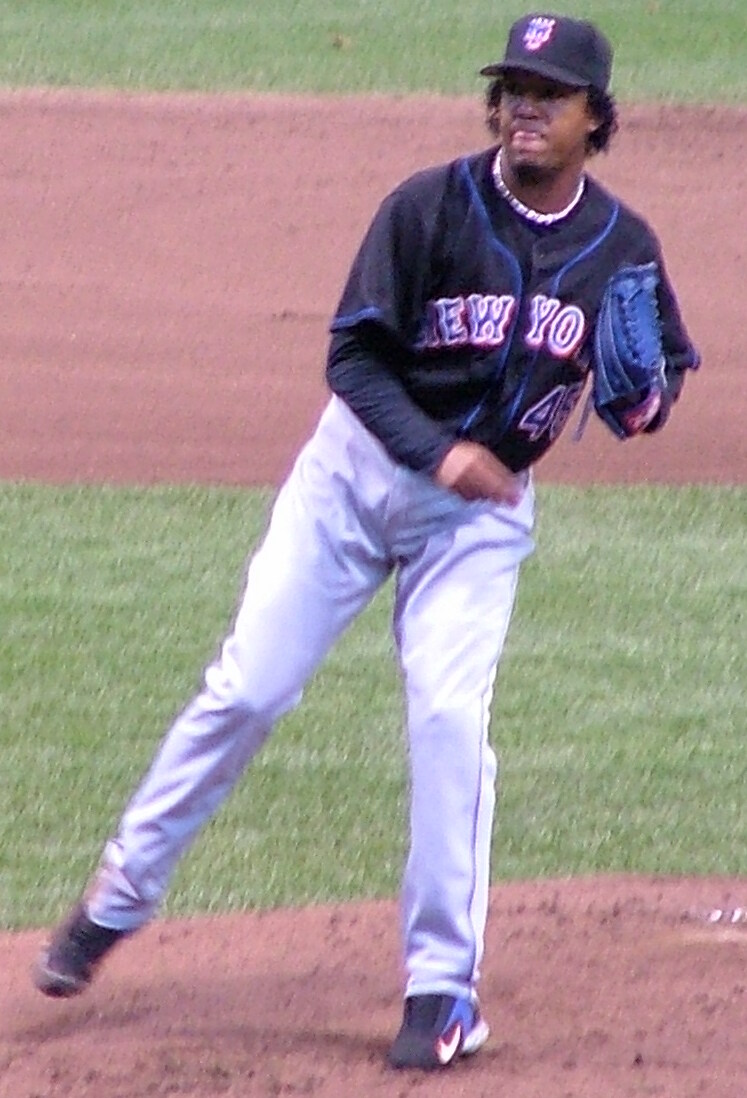
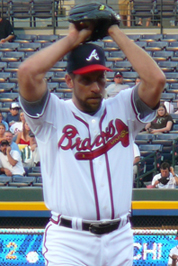
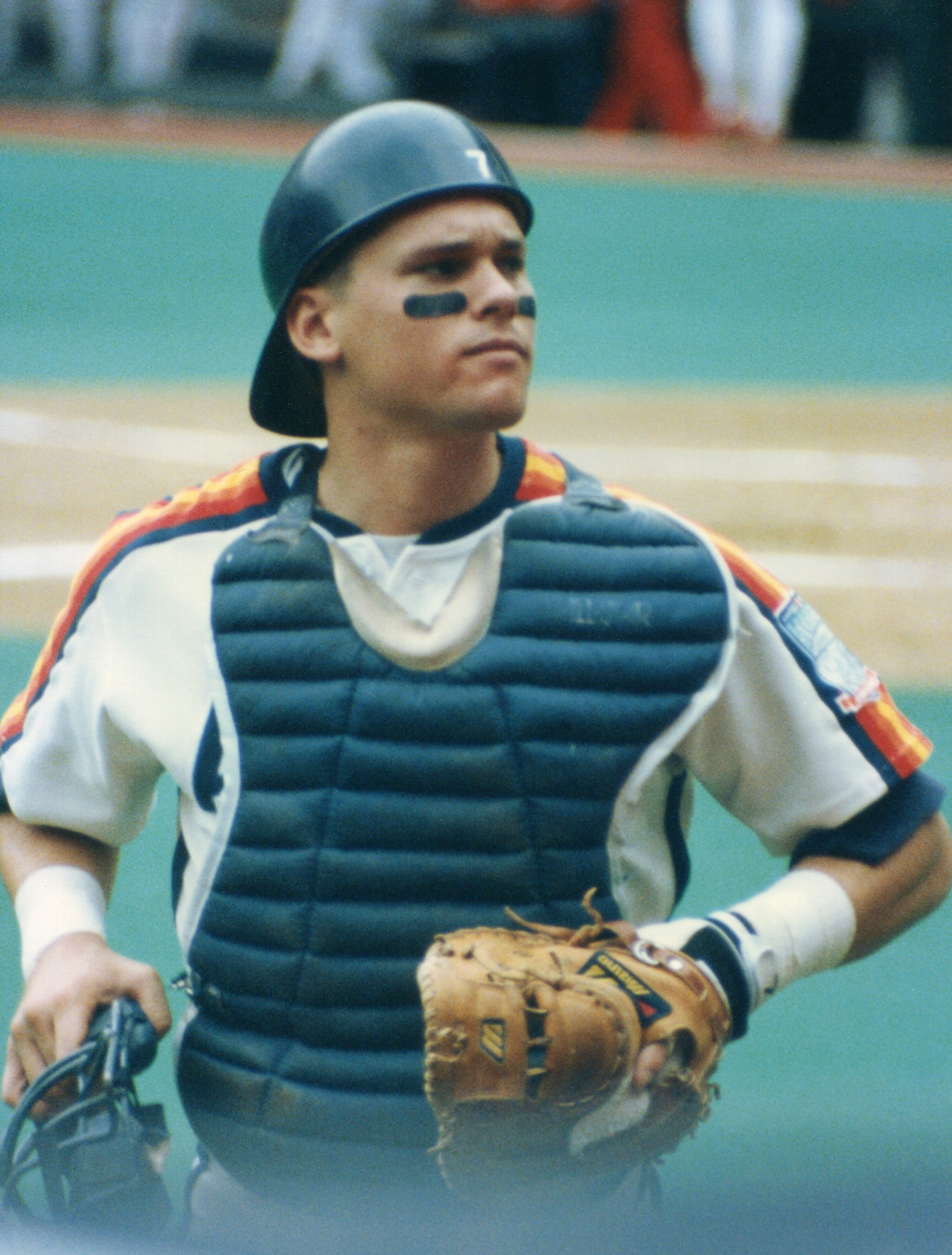
2015 inductees (L-R): Randy Johnson, Pedro Martínez, John Smoltz, and Craig Biggio

Elections to the Baseball Hall of Fame for 2015 proceeded according to rules most recently amended in 2014. As in the past, the Baseball Writers' Association of America (BBWAA) voted by mail to select from a ballot of recently retired players, with results announced on January 6, 2015. Randy Johnson, Pedro Martínez, John Smoltz and Craig Biggio were elected to the Hall of Fame. It was the first time since 1955 that the BBWAA elected four players in one year.

The Golden Era Committee, one of three voting panels by era that replaced the more broadly defined Veterans Committee following an earlier rules change in July 2010, convened at Major League Baseball's winter meetings in San Diego on December 8, 2014, to select from a ballot of 10 retired players and non-playing personnel who made their greatest contributions to the sport between 1947 and 1972. None of these candidates received enough votes to be elected.

The Hall of Fame induction ceremonies were held on July 26 at the Hall of Fame in Cooperstown, New York, with new commissioner Rob Manfred presiding for the first time. On the day before the actual induction ceremony, the annual Hall of Fame Awards Presentation took place. At that event, two awards for media excellence were presented – the Hall's Ford C. Frick Award for broadcasters and the BBWAA's J. G. Taylor Spink Award for writers. The other major Hall of Fame award, the Buck O'Neil Lifetime Achievement Award, was not scheduled to be presented again until 2017. Among the other portions of the ceremonies was a presentation by Secretary of the Navy Ray Mabus honoring the service of baseball personnel in World War II; he also announced the naming of the littoral combat ship USS Cooperstown.

== BBWAA election ==
Key
	Elected to the Hall of Fame on this ballot (named in **bold italics**).
	Elected subsequently, as of 2026 (named in plain italics).
	Renominated for the 2016 BBWAA election by adequate performance on this ballot and has not been elected, as of 2026.
	Eliminated from annual BBWAA consideration by poor performance or expiration on this ballot and has not been elected, as of 2026.
†	First time on the BBWAA ballot.
*	Eliminated from annual BBWAA consideration by poor performance or expiration on this ballot.

On July 26, 2014, the Hall of Fame announced revisions to the rules for recently retired players, decreasing the number of years a player can be on the ballot from 15 to 10. Three candidates presently on the BBWAA ballot (Lee Smith, Don Mattingly and Alan Trammell) in years 10-15 were grandfathered into this system and retained their previous 15 years of eligibility. In addition, BBWAA members who were otherwise eligible to cast ballots were required to complete a registration form and sign a code of conduct before receiving their ballots, and the Hall made public the names of all members who cast ballots (but not their individual votes) when it announced the election results. The code of conduct specifically states that the ballot is non-transferable, a direct reaction to Dan Le Batard's actions in the 2014 balloting process. Violation of the code of conduct will result in a lifetime ban from BBWAA voting.

The ballot included two categories of players:

- Candidates from the 2014 ballot who received at least 5% of the vote but were not elected, as long as they first appeared on the BBWAA ballot no earlier than 2001.
- Selected individuals, chosen by a screening committee, whose last appearance was in 2009.

There were 549 total ballots cast and 4,623 individual votes for players, for an average of 8.4 players named per ballot.

All BBWAA members with at least 10 years of continuous membership were eligible to vote. One member of the 2014 electorate, Dan Le Batard, was suspended from the BBWAA for a year (which automatically made him ineligible to cast a vote in this election) and also banned for life from voting in any future Hall of Fame election after he revealed that he had turned over his 2014 ballot to Deadspin and allowed the website's readers to make selections.

As in most recent elections, the controversy over use of performance-enhancing drugs (PEDs) dominated the election. ESPN.com columnist Jim Caple noted in the days before the announcement of the 2012 results that the PED issue and the BBWAA's limit of 10 votes per ballot was likely to result in a major backlog in upcoming elections:

Due to the steroid issue and a general lack of consensus, the following players will probably be on the ballot in three years: Barry Bonds, Roger Clemens, Pedro Martinez, Randy Johnson, Sammy Sosa, Jeff Bagwell, John Smoltz, Edgar Martinez, Mark McGwire, Mike Mussina, Jeff Kent, Larry Walker, Alan Trammell, Fred McGriff, Rafael Palmeiro, Lee Smith, Tim Raines, Gary Sheffield, Mike Piazza, Curt Schilling and, of course, Bernie [Williams]. That's 21 players who warrant serious consideration. And that's not counting Barry Larkin, who might be elected this year, and also assuming Greg Maddux, Tom Glavine, Craig Biggio and Frank Thomas make it their first years on the ballot. Finding room for Bonds, Clemens, Pedro, Johnson and others means I'll have to dump more good players from my ballot than the Marlins dumped after winning the 1997 World Series.

Caple's predictions about the players on the 2015 ballot, as well as the players he expected to be elected before then, mostly proved accurate. Larkin was indeed elected in 2012, and Maddux, Glavine and Thomas were elected on their first ballot appearance in 2014. The main exceptions were Palmeiro and Williams, who got less than 5% of the vote in prior elections and failed to stay on, and Biggio, who fell short of election in both of his first two years on the ballot, missing out in 2014 by two votes.

Another ESPN.com writer, Tim Kurkjian, noted that the 2013 ballot would include several new candidates who either tested positive or were strongly linked to PEDs:

The next Hall of Fame ballot will include Barry Bonds, Roger Clemens, Sammy Sosa, Mike Piazza, Craig Biggio and Curt Schilling. They all have Hall of Fame numbers, some stronger than others, but Bonds, Clemens, Sosa and Piazza certainly are not going to be elected on the first ballot — and in the case of Bonds, Clemens and Sosa, they might not make it to Cooperstown for many, many years to come.

Don Mattingly was on the ballot for the 15th and final time.

Player	Votes (549 cast)	Percent	Change	Year
**Randy Johnson**†	534	97.3%	–	1st
**Pedro Martínez**†	500	91.1%	–	1st
**John Smoltz**†	455	82.9%	–	1st
**Craig Biggio**	454	82.7%	▲7.9%	3rd
Mike Piazza	384	69.9%	▲7.7%	3rd
Jeff Bagwell	306	55.7%	▲1.4%	5th
Tim Raines	302	55.0%	▲8.9%	8th
Curt Schilling	215	39.2%	▲10.0%	3rd
Roger Clemens	206	37.5%	▲2.1%	3rd
Barry Bonds	202	36.8%	▲2.1%	3rd
Lee Smith	166	30.2%	▲0.3%	13th
Edgar Martínez	148	27.0%	▲1.8%	6th
Alan Trammell	138	25.1%	▲4.3%	14th
Mike Mussina	135	24.6%	▲4.3%	2nd
Jeff Kent	77	14.0%	▼1.2%	2nd
Fred McGriff	71	12.9%	▲1.2%	6th
Larry Walker	65	11.8%	▲1.6%	5th
Gary Sheffield†	64	11.7%	–	1st
Mark McGwire	55	10.0%	▼1.0%	9th
Don Mattingly	50	9.1%	▲0.9%	15th
Sammy Sosa	36	6.6%	▼0.6%	3rd
Nomar Garciaparra†	30	5.5%	–	1st
Carlos Delgado†*	21	3.8%	–	1st
Troy Percival†*	4	0.7%	–	1st
Aaron Boone†*	2	0.4%	–	1st
Tom Gordon†*	2	0.4%	–	1st
Darin Erstad†*	1	0.2%	–	1st
Rich Aurilia†*	0	0	–	1st
Tony Clark†*	0	0	–	1st
Jermaine Dye†*	0	0	–	1st
Cliff Floyd†*	0	0	–	1st
Brian Giles†*	0	0	–	1st
Eddie Guardado†*	0	0	–	1st
Jason Schmidt†*	0	0	–	1st

Players who were eligible for the first time who were not included on the ballot were: Marlon Anderson, Paul Bako, Michael Barrett, Chad Bradford, Doug Brocail, Emil Brown, Paul Byrd, Raul Chavez, Joe Crede, David Dellucci, Adam Eaton, Alan Embree, Kelvim Escobar, Chad Fox, Tony Graffanino, Matt Herges, Braden Looper, Mark Loretta, Ramón Martínez, Doug Mientkiewicz, Kevin Millar, Eric Milton, Greg Norton, Tomo Ohka, Sidney Ponson, Glendon Rusch, B.J. Ryan, Brian Shouse, Justin Speier, Julián Tavárez, Ron Villone, Luis Vizcaino, Jamie Walker, Jarrod Washburn and David Weathers.

== Golden Era Committee ==
In keeping with the current Hall of Fame voting procedure, the BBWAA-appointed Historical Overview Committee, made up of 11 BBWAA members, identified 10 Golden Era candidates who were judged to have made their greatest contributions between 1947 and 1972. Along with the 1947–1972 era, these rules defined the consideration set:

- Players who played in at least 10 major league seasons, who are not on Major League Baseball's ineligible list (e.g., Pete Rose), and have been retired for 21 or more seasons.
- Managers and umpires with 10 or more years in baseball and retired for at least five years. Candidates who are 65 years or older are eligible six months following retirement.
- Executives retired for at least five years. Active executives age 65 or older are eligible for consideration.

The eleven Historical Overview Committee members (the same members who served in 2011) were: Dave Van Dyck (Chicago Tribune), Bob Elliot (Toronto Sun), Rick Hummel (St. Louis Post Dispatch), Steve Hirdt (Elias Sports Bureau), Bill Madden (New York Daily News), Ken Nigro (formerly Baltimore Sun), Jack O'Connell (BBWAA Secretary/Treasurer), Tracy Ringolsby (MLB.com), Glen Schwartz (formerly San Francisco Chronicle), Claire Smith (ESPN) and Mark Whicker (Los Angeles News Group). The names of the committee members were released by the Hall of Fame on November 4, 2014.

The ballot for election by the Golden Era Committee was released on October 30, 2014; the committee voted at the MLB winter meetings in San Diego on December 8, 2014, with the results announced by MLB immediately thereafter. The cutoff for election and summer 2015 induction remained the standard 75%, or 12 of 16 votes. None of the candidates received enough votes, continuing a long period of difficulty in electing players eligible under the Hall's special committees; the last living player elected to the Hall after the expiration of his BBWAA eligibility was Bill Mazeroski in 2001.

Candidate	Category	Votes	Percent	Ref
Dick Allen	Player	11	68.75%	
Tony Oliva	Player	11	68.75%	
Jim Kaat	Player	10	62.5%	
Maury Wills	Player	9	56.25%	
Minnie Miñoso	Player	8	50%	
Ken Boyer	Player	<3		
Gil Hodges	Player	<3		
Bob Howsam	Executive	<3		
Billy Pierce	Player	<3		
Luis Tiant	Player	<3		

This election marked the second time this era had been considered; Ron Santo was elected by the committee and inducted in 2012. In addition, Joe Torre – another popular candidate from this period – was inducted as a manager in 2014. Four of the candidates – Allen, Howsam, Pierce, and Wills – were considered for the first time. Among the holdovers from the 2011 Golden Era balloting were four who received at least half of the committee votes: Kaat (10), Hodges (9), Miñoso (9), and Oliva (8). Seven of the candidates were living when the ballot was announced, the exceptions being Hodges, Boyer, and Howsam (who respectively died in 1972, 1982 and 2008).

The Golden Era Committee's 16-member voting electorate, appointed by the Hall of Fame's Board of Directors, was announced at the same time as the ballot of 10 candidates. The Baseball Hall of Fame officially named this group the "Golden Era Committee" ("The Committee"), which voted for the first time on December 5, 2011. All of the Hall of Fame members on this committee were inducted as players, except for executive Pat Gillick.

- Hall of Famers: Jim Bunning, Rod Carew, Pat Gillick, Ferguson Jenkins, Al Kaline, Joe Morgan, Ozzie Smith, Don Sutton
- Executives: Jim Frey, David Glass, Roland Hemond, Bob Watson
- Media: Steve Hirdt, Dick Kaegel, Phil Pepe, Tracy Ringolsby

In July 2016, the Hall announced a major change to its era-based committee system, replacing the then-existing three voting bodies with four new panels. The change will have a significant effect on future elections of individuals who had been considered by the Golden Era Committee. In the new system, the closest equivalent to the Golden Era Committee is the new Golden Days Committee, which will consider figures whose greatest contributions occurred between 1950 and 1969. Also, this new voting body will only meet once every five years, specifically in years ending in 0 and 5 as part of the election process for the next year's induction ceremony.

== J. G. Taylor Spink Award ==
The J. G. Taylor Spink Award has been presented by the BBWAA at the annual summer induction ceremonies since 1962. Through 2010, it was awarded during the main induction ceremony, but is now given the previous day at the Hall of Fame Awards Presentation. It recognizes a sportswriter "for meritorious contributions to baseball writing". The recipients are not members of the Hall of Fame but are featured in a permanent exhibit at the National Baseball Museum.

The three nominees for the 2015 award, selected by a BBWAA committee, were announced at the BBWAA's annual All-Star Game meeting on July 15, 2014. They were the late Furman Bisher, longtime columnist for the Atlanta Journal-Constitution; Tom Gage, beat writer for The Detroit News; and Dan Shaughnessy, columnist for The Boston Globe. Under BBWAA rules, the winner was to be announced either during the 2014 World Series or at the 2014 winter meetings; in recent years, the announcement has been made at the winter meetings.

On December 9, Tom Gage was named as the recipient. Of the record 463 ballots cast (including one blank), Gage received 167 to Bisher's 161, with Shaughnessy receiving 134. The vote was the closest since balloting by mail began in 2002, both by the margin between the top two candidates and the gap between the three finalists. At the time of announcement, Gage was covering the Detroit Tigers for The Detroit News, a position he had held since leaving his original home of The Times-Picayune of New Orleans in 1978. He had twice been Michigan's sportswriter of the year, and had also not missed a day while on the Tigers beat – including covering a night game after undergoing a root canal procedure that morning. He is also a past member of the Hall of Fame ballot screening committee.

== Ford C. Frick Award ==
The Ford C. Frick Award, honoring excellence in baseball broadcasting, has been presented at the induction ceremonies since 1978. Through 2010, it had been presented at the main induction ceremony, but is now awarded at the Awards Presentation. Recipients are not members of the Hall of Fame but are permanently recognized in an exhibit at the museum. To be eligible, an active or retired broadcaster must have a minimum of 10 years of continuous major league broadcast service with a ball club, a network, or a combination of the two. The honor is based on four criteria: longevity; continuity with a club; honors, including national assignments such as the World Series and All-Star Games; and popularity with fans. The 2015 recipient was announced during the 2014 winter meetings, following a vote by a 20-member committee composed of the living recipients along with broadcasting historians and columnists.

This was the second Frick Award selection under a process similar to that instituted for Veterans Committee balloting in 2010. Candidates are now considered every third year, based on the era in which they made their most significant contributions:

- "Living Room Era" — Mid-1950s to early 1980s, including the rise of television. Individuals from this era were considered for the 2015 award.
- "Broadcasting Dawn Era" — 1920s to early 1950s, including the early radio broadcasters. Individuals from this era were later considered for the 2016 award.
- "High Tide Era" — Mid-1980s to present, including the rise of regional cable networks. Individuals from this era were considered for the 2014 award, and were to be considered for the 2017 award.

Also, the committee that selects the final recipient no longer has a role in determining any of the finalists. Before the 2014 selection process, the selection committee also chose seven of the 10 finalists, but that role has now been given to a Hall of Fame research committee.

Ten finalists from the "Living Room Era" were announced on October 3, 2014. In accord with the current guidelines, seven were chosen by a Hall of Fame research committee, while the other three were selected from a list of candidates by fan voting at the Hall's Facebook page from September 8 to September 30.

- Richie Ashburn
- Billy Berroa
- René Cárdenas
- Dizzy Dean
- Dick Enberg
- Ernie Johnson, Sr.
- Ralph Kiner
- Ned Martin
- Joe Nuxhall
- Jack Quinlan

At the time of the announcement of the finalists, only Cárdenas and Enberg were still living, and only Enberg was still active. The broadcasting careers of the finalists covered a span of nearly 75 years, starting with the beginning of Dean's broadcasting career immediately after his retirement as a player in 1941. In addition to the still-active Enberg, three other finalists (Berroa, Kiner, and Nuxhall) were active in the 21st century. Three of the finalists (Ashburn, Dean, and Kiner) are Hall of Fame members as players.

On December 10, 2014, Enberg was named as the recipient. He began his MLB broadcasting career in 1968 as the play-by-play announcer for the California Angels, continuing in that role through 1978. Enberg joined NBC Sports in 1975, covering baseball plus many other sports for the next quarter-century. He then moved to CBS Sports in 2000; after leaving that network in 2010, he became the play-by-play announcer for the San Diego Padres, a position he still held when he was announced as the recipient.
