= Craig Biggio =

American baseball player (born 1965)

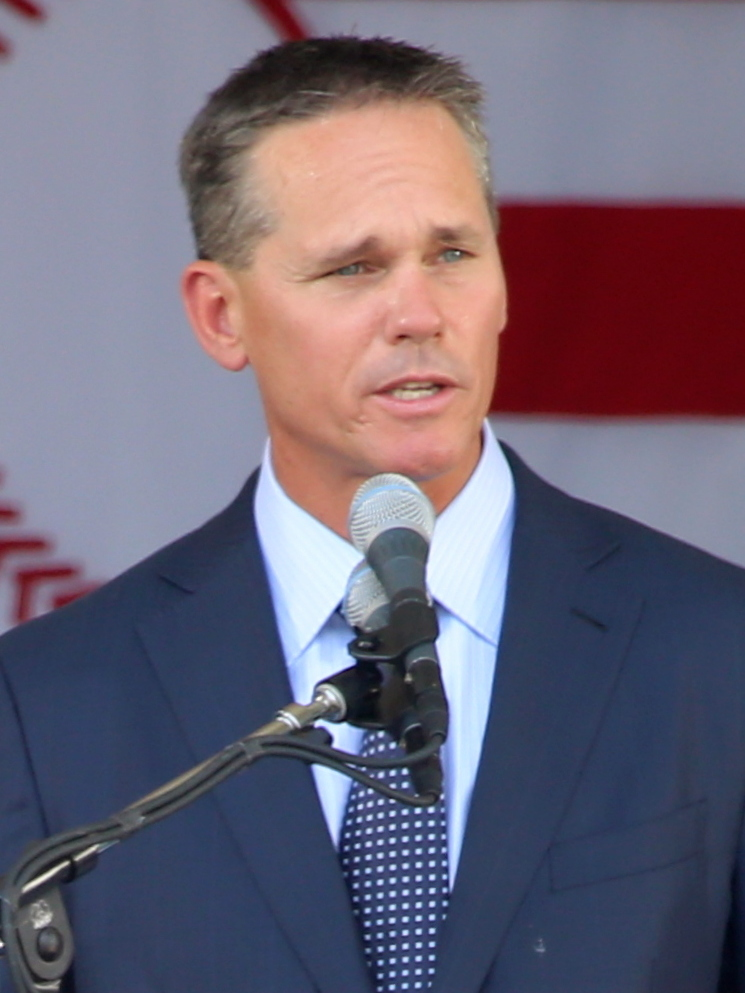
- Biggio in 2015
- Second baseman / Catcher / Outfielder
- Born: December 14, 1965 (age 60); Smithtown, New York, U.S.
- Batted: Right Threw: Right

MLB debut
- June 26, 1988, for the Houston Astros

Last MLB appearance
- September 30, 2007, for the Houston Astros

MLB statistics
- Batting average: .281
- Hits: 3,060
- Home runs: 291
- Runs batted in: 1,175
- Stolen bases: 414
- Stats at Baseball Reference

Teams
- Houston Astros (1988–2007)

Career highlights and awards
- 7× All-Star (1991, 1992, 1994–1998); 4× Gold Glove Award (1994–1997); 5× Silver Slugger Award (1989, 1994, 1995, 1997, 1998); Roberto Clemente Award (2007); NL stolen base leader (1994); Houston Astros No. 7 retired; Houston Astros Hall of Fame

Member of the National

Baseball Hall of Fame
- Induction: 2015
- Vote: 82.7% (third ballot)

Craig Alan Biggio (/ˈbɪdʒioʊ/; born December 14, 1965) is an American former professional baseball second baseman, outfielder, and catcher who played 20 seasons in Major League Baseball for the Houston Astros, from 1988 to 2007. A seven-time National League (NL) All-Star often regarded as the greatest all-around player in Astros history, he is the only player ever to be named an All-Star and to be awarded Silver Slugger Award at both catcher and second base. With longtime teammates Jeff Bagwell and Lance Berkman, he formed the core of the "Killer B's" who led Houston to six playoff appearances from 1997 to 2005, culminating in the franchise's first World Series appearance in 2005 in which the Astros lost by being swept by the Chicago White Sox. At the end of his career, he ranked sixth in NL history in games played (2,850), fifth in at bats (10,876), 21st in hits (3,060), and seventh in runs scored (1,844). His 668 career doubles ranked sixth in major league history, and are the second-most ever by a right-handed hitter; his 56 doubles in 1999 were the most in the major leagues in 63 years.

Biggio, who batted .300 four times and scored 100 runs eight times, holds Astros franchise records for most career games, at bats, hits, runs scored, doubles, total bases (4,711) and extra base hits (1,014), and ranks second in runs batted in (1,175), walks (1,160) and stolen bases (414). He also holds the NL record for most times leading off a game with a home run (53), and is one of only five players with 250 home runs and 400 steals. A four-time Gold Glove Award winner who led NL second basemen in assists six times and putouts five times, he retired ranking fourth in NL history in games at second base (1,989), sixth in assists (5,448) and fielding percentage (.984), seventh in putouts (3,992) and double plays (1,153), and eighth in total chances (9,596). He was the ninth player in the 3,000 hit club to collect all his hits with one team. Biggio also led the NL in times hit by pitch five times, with his career total of 285 trailing only Hughie Jennings' 287 in major league history.

One of the most admired players of his generation, Biggio received the 2005 Hutch Award for perseverance through adversity and the 2007 Roberto Clemente Award for sportsmanship and community service. The Astros retired the number 7 in his honor the year following his retirement. Since 2008, Biggio has served as special assistant to the general manager of the Astros. In 2015, Biggio was elected to the National Baseball Hall of Fame, becoming the first member of the Hall to be depicted in an Astros uniform on his plaque.

== Early life ==
=== High school ===
Craig Biggio graduated from Kings Park High School in Kings Park, New York, where he excelled as a multi-sport varsity athlete. After the 1983 season Biggio was awarded the Hansen Award, which recognized him as being the best football player in Suffolk County. Biggio turned down football scholarships for the opportunity to play baseball for Seton Hall University.

=== College career ===
Although Biggio was an infielder, Seton Hall coach Mike Sheppard switched him to catcher because the team was in need of one. In 1986, he played collegiate summer baseball in the Cape Cod Baseball League for the Yarmouth-Dennis Red Sox. Biggio was an All-American baseball player at Seton Hall, where he played with other future Major League Baseball stars Mo Vaughn and John Valentin. Biggio, Vaughn and Valentin, along with Marteese Robinson, were featured in the book The Hit Men and the Kid Who Batted Ninth by David Siroty, which chronicled their rise from college teammates to the major leagues.

Biggio was selected by the Houston Astros in the first round (22nd overall) of the 1987 draft. Biggio remains Seton Hall's leader in triples, second in runs scored, and is in the top 10 in 18 other single-season and career categories. In 1996, Biggio was inducted into the Seton Hall Hall of Fame and had his number 44 retired in 2012.

== Major league career ==
=== Early career ===
==== As catcher ====
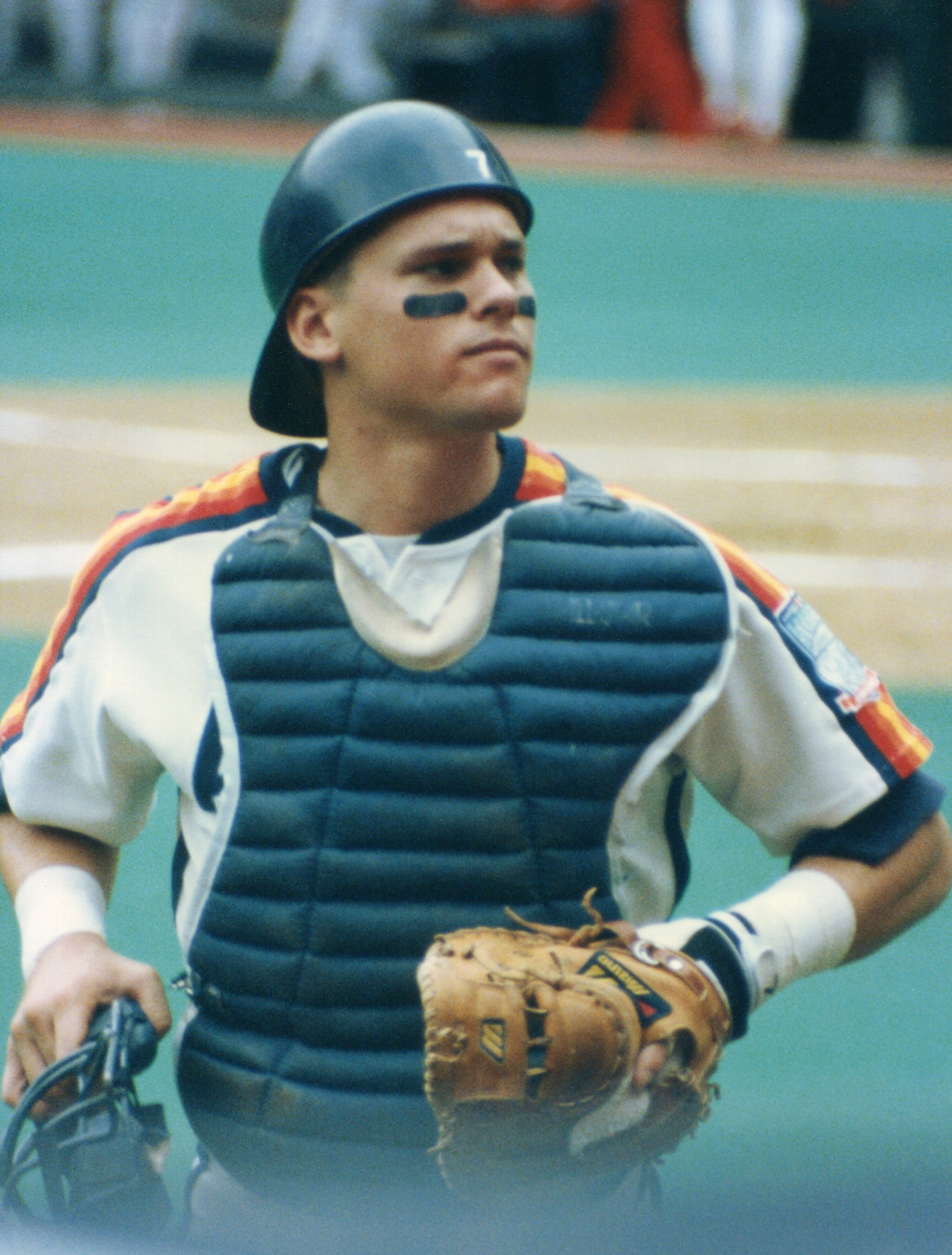
Biggio playing catcher in 1990

Biggio was called up as a catcher midway through the 1988 season, having batted .344 in his minor league career. In 1989, his first full season, Biggio became the Astros' starting catcher. He won the Silver Slugger Award in 1989. He was a very speedy runner, and an adept base stealer. Astros management, in an attempt to keep the rigors of catching from sapping Biggio's speed, tried him in the outfield part-time in 1990, as he had played 18 games there in the minors. Yogi Berra mentioned Biggio's height in his book You Can Observe A Lot By Watching, saying, "I always identified with short catchers—they don't have to stand up as far".

==== Emergence of the "Killer B's" ====
The Astros acquired first baseman Jeff Bagwell prior to the start of the 1991 season. A power hitter with higher-than-normal on-base skills, Bagwell played 15 seasons, thus completely overlapping his career with Biggio's and wound up Houston's career leader in home runs. The pair came to be known as the "Killer B's", synonymous with the Astros throughout the 1990s and into the 2000s. A prodigious offensive and defensive unit, during their 10 peak seasons from 1994 to 2003, they appeared in nine All-Star Games, won five Gold Gloves, ranked in the top five of the Most Valuable Player Award voting five times and averaged 226 runs scored. They totaled 689 home runs, 2,485 RBI and 3,083 runs scored while the Astros advanced to the postseason six times. Other players that the Astros later acquired whose names started with the letter B also were included in this distinction, including Derek Bell, Sean Berry, Lance Berkman, and Carlos Beltrán.

Biggio considered free agency with a team other than the Astros just once: after the 1995 season ended, teams such as the St. Louis Cardinals, Colorado Rockies, and the San Diego Padres; the Rockies and Cardinals were the most serious, with the former offering $20 million for four years while the latter approached him with a five-year, $25 million contract. However, Biggio took a four-year deal worth $22 million to stay with the Astros.

==== Shift to second base ====
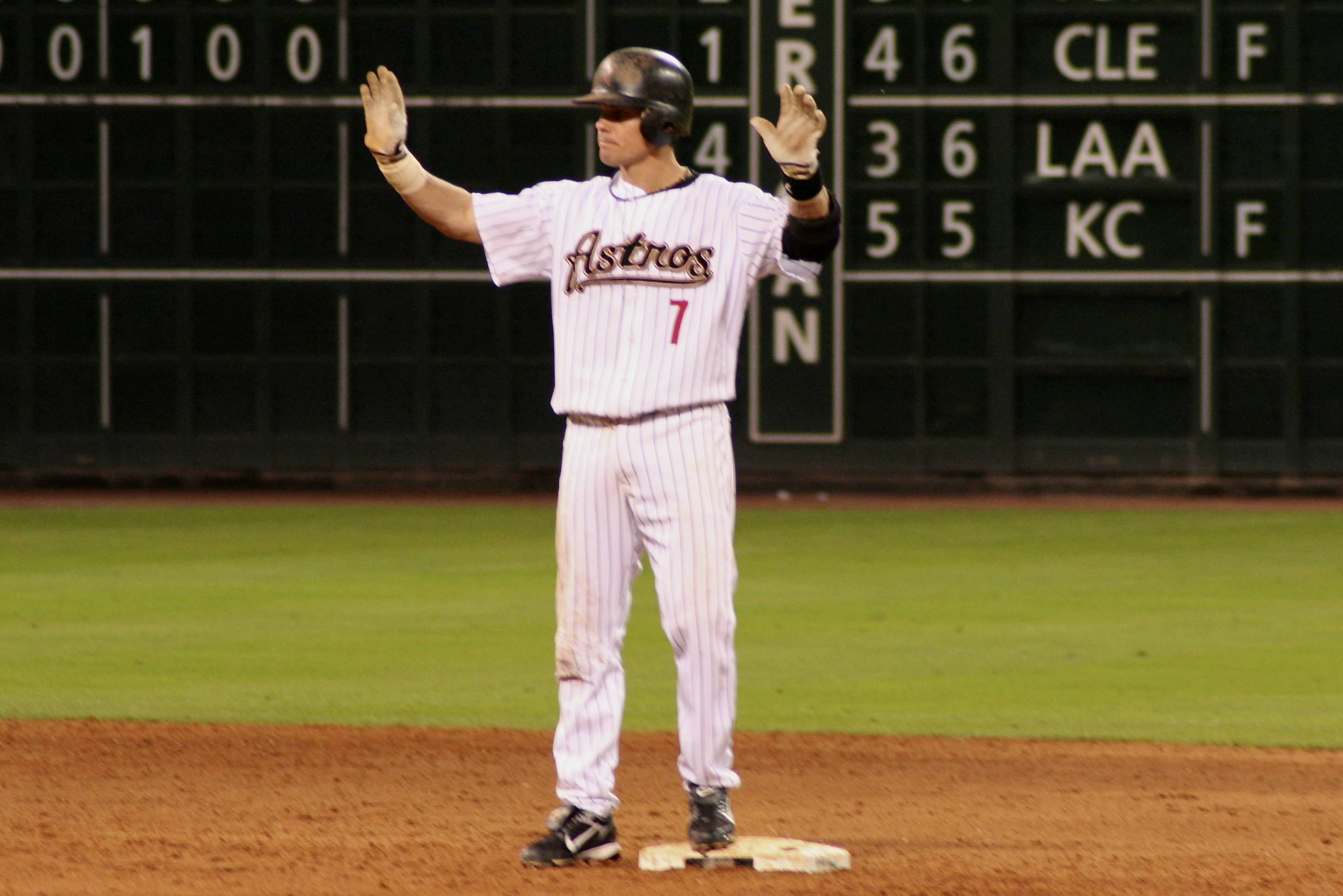
Biggio with the Houston Astros

The Astros finally convinced Biggio to convert to second base in spring training of 1992, even though Biggio had made the National League All-Star team as a catcher the year before. Biggio made the All-Star team for the second time in 1992, becoming the first player in the history of baseball to be an All-Star at both catcher and second base. It is rare for a major league catcher to make a successful transition to middle infielder; if a catcher changes positions, it is usually to first base, or occasionally to outfield or third base.

Biggio became known as a reliable, hustling, consistent leadoff hitter, with unusual power for a second baseman. He holds the National League record for most home runs to lead off a game, with 53. Manager Larry Dierker, hired in 1997 by the Astros, moved Biggio from the second spot in the lineup to leadoff. His statistics reflect this, having consistently good marks in hitting, on-base percentage, hit-by-pitch, runs, stolen bases, and doubles throughout his career. Between 1994 and 1999, Biggio led the National League in doubles three times, runs scored twice, and stolen bases once. Biggio was also known for intentionally keeping his batting helmet dirty. In 1997, he completed an entire season without grounding into a double play, becoming the fifth player to ever do so in MLB history. In 1998, he became the first player since Tris Speaker to collect fifty doubles and fifty stolen bases in the same season, doing so with his 50th stolen base on September 23 (Biggio and Speaker were the only players to record the feat in the 20th century). Biggio also hit 20 home runs to join the 20–50 club. He also excelled defensively at second base; between 1992 and 1999, Biggio led all National League second basemen in assists six times and putouts five times. He won four consecutive Gold Glove Awards from 1994 to 1997.

=== Career setbacks: Injury and the outfield ===
Biggio played 1,800 games without a trip to the disabled list until August 1, 2000, when he suffered a season-ending knee injury. In the play in which Biggio was injured, the Florida Marlins' Preston Wilson (who would later become Biggio's teammate) slid into second base, trying to stop a double play, and hit Biggio's planted left leg, tearing the ACL and MCL in Biggio's knee. Biggio rebounded with a good season in 2001, but had a lackluster performance in 2002, with only a .253 average, his lowest since entering the league; a highlight occurred on April 8, when he hit for the cycle for the only time in his career.

However, he improved slightly for the 2003 season, averaging .264 with 166 hits despite being asked by management to move to center field after the signing of free agent All-Star second baseman Jeff Kent. In 2004, he put up numbers more typical for his career, batting .281 with 178 hits, including a career-high 24 homers. Biggio moved to yet another new position, left field, midway through the 2004 season to accommodate Beltrán, who was acquired in a trade to help bolster the Astros' struggling offense. The Astros were 44-44 at the All-Star break. Having fired Jimy Williams for Phil Garner, the Astros went 48-26, which included a 36-10 stretch to end the year while narrowly clinching the NL wild card on the final day of the regular season. In the 2004 National League Division Series, the Astros were matched against the Atlanta Braves, which was the fourth time the two teams were playing each other in the past seven years, and the Braves had won each of the matchups. Biggio batted 8-for-20 (.400) in a series that went the full five game distance. In Game 4, he hit a home run, which was his first career postseason home run. In Game 5 in Atlanta, the Astros were attempting to clinch the series after blowing Game 4. In the seventh inning, leading 4-2 in the seventh inning, Biggio was at the plate with Jose Vizcaino at second base with two out. Biggio hit a single that drove Vizcaino in from second that would start a two-out rally, as Biggio and three further batters would go on to score to make a 9-2 lead. Two innings later, the Astros won the game 12-3 to clinch the first postseason series victory in Astros history. The Astros went to the 2004 National League Championship Series against the St. Louis Cardinals. Biggio went 6-for-32 (.188) as the series went the full distance. Biggio had one RBI in the series, which was a leadoff home run in Game 7. The Astros led 2-1 in the sixth inning before the Cardinals rallied to win 5-2 to end the season.

=== Late career: Return to second base and milestones ===
==== World Series appearance (2005) ====
In February 2005, Biggio and Bagwell were inducted into the Texas Sports Hall of Fame. After Kent left for the Dodgers, Biggio resumed playing at second base and set a new career-high with 26 home runs. He also reached 1,000 RBI, becoming the second Astro to do so, following Bagwell. On September 5 of that season, he helped the Astros against the Philadelphia Phillies in a critical game late in the season; the Astros were narrowly ahead of the Phillies (and other teams) for the lone Wild Card spot. The Phillies had taken the lead late 6-5 and had Billy Wagner in relief. However, with two out in the ninth inning and two men on base, Biggio hit a home run that gave the Astros the lead that they did not give up in an 8–5 victory (the Astros went on to win the Wild Card by one game).

As they had done the previous year, the Astros beat the Braves to advance to the NLCS. They avenged their previous loss to the St. Louis Cardinals in six games to win their first league pennant. In the clinching sixth game, Biggio did his part with a third inning single that drove in a run in the 5-1 victory. After having played 4,714 games and their entire major league careers together in Houston, Biggio and Bagwell appeared in their first and only World Series that year against the Chicago White Sox. The White Sox swept the Astros to secure the championship with the lowest run-scoring differential in a World Series sweep. Both Biggio and Bagwell received Baseball America's Lifetime Achievement Award after the 2005 season. On May 23, 2006, Biggio became the 23rd player in MLB history to reach 10,000 at-bats.

==== 3,000 career hits (2007) ====
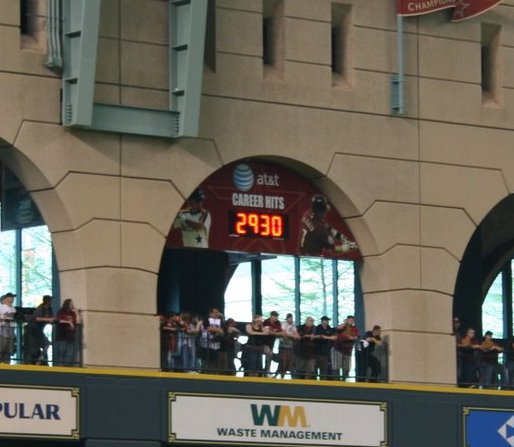
Biggio's hit counter, prior to the start of the 2007 season.

On June 28, 2007, Biggio became the 27th player in the history of Major League Baseball to join the 3,000 hit club, with a single against Colorado Rockies pitcher Aaron Cook. Though Biggio was tagged out on the play attempting to stretch it into a double, drawing the throw allowed a run to score. The game action paused while Biggio shared the moment with his wife and children. Longtime friend and former teammate Jeff Bagwell emerged from the Astros clubhouse to congratulate him. Biggio became the first player in Astros history to accumulate 3,000 hits. It was Biggio's third hit of the game, and he went on to accumulate two more later in the game, one in the ninth inning and one in the eleventh inning. He became the first player in history to record his 3,000th hit and have five hits in the same game. Biggio's 3,000th hit came on the same day that Frank Thomas hit his milestone 500th career home run, both marks which are considered to guarantee induction into the Hall of Fame.

In anticipation of Biggio's reaching 3,000 hits, the Astros installed a digital counter just left of center field displaying his current hit total.

With 668 doubles, he ended his career in fifth place on the all-time list. Biggio also holds the record for the most doubles by a right-handed hitter. He is the only player in the history of baseball with 3,000 hits, 600 doubles, 400 stolen bases, and 250 home runs. He ranks 20th on the all-time hits list, though of those 20 players he ranks 19th in career batting average. No player had more hits than Biggio had during his playing career.

Biggio fell nine home runs short of joining the career 300–300 club (300 homers and 300 stolen bases). He would have become only the seventh player to achieve the feat. Incidentally, this also caused him to fall short of the 3,000 hits, 300 homers and 300 stolen bases mark; he would have been only the second player in history to reach that club, the other being Willie Mays.

=== Retirement ===
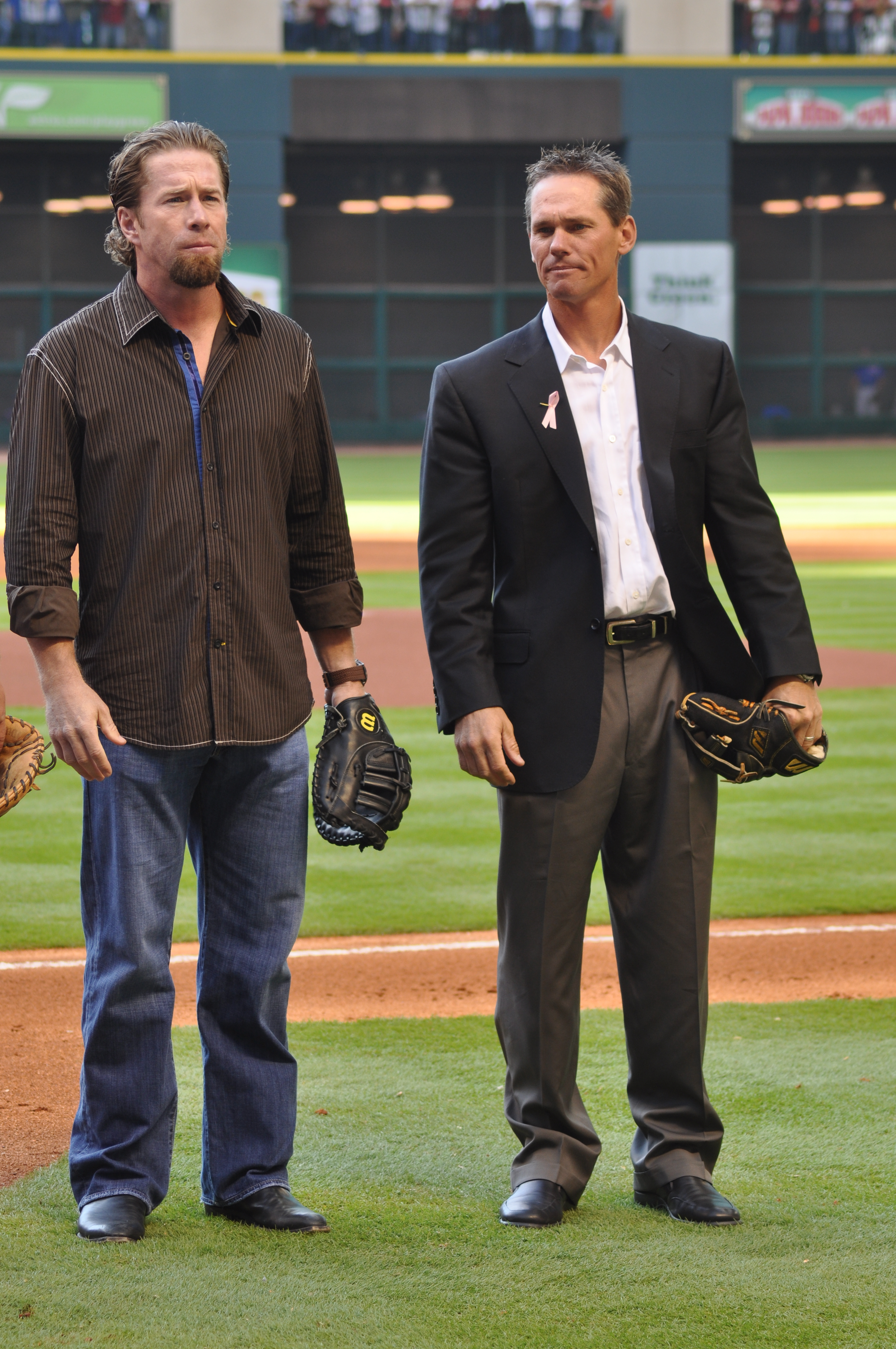
Jeff Bagwell (left) and Craig Biggio (right).

On July 24, 2007, Biggio announced his retirement, effective at the end of the season (his 20th season with the club, a franchise record). Hours later, with the Astros locked in a 3–3 tie with the Los Angeles Dodgers, Biggio hit a grand slam in the 6th inning. The Astros went on to win the game 7–4.

In the penultimate game of his career, Biggio started as a catcher and caught 2 innings for the Astros. He also hit a double in his first at-bat of the game.

A sellout, record-breaking crowd packed Minute Maid Park on September 30, 2007, to witness Biggio's final game. He recorded his final career hit, a double in the first inning, and scored his final career run that same inning. In his final career at-bat, he grounded the ball to third baseman Chipper Jones, who threw out the hustling Biggio by half a step. He left the field to a standing ovation from the fans, and when he was replaced defensively in the top of the 8th inning he shook hands with umpires and teammates and left to another standing ovation as he waved to the fans. The Astros won the game 3–0.

Biggio finished his career with 3,060 career hits, 668 doubles, 291 home runs, 1,175 RBI, 414 stolen bases, and a .281 batting average.

=== Post-retirement ===
Biggio has been a special assistant to the general manager since 2008. In this role, he works in several areas, including with the baseball operations staff in its major and minor league player development programs with special emphasis on instruction, the amateur draft and scouting, and major and minor league talent evaluation. Biggio was involved in the selection of new Astros Manager Bo Porter in 2012. Additionally, Biggio participates in the club's community development program.

=== Hit by pitch ===
Over his career, Biggio gained a reputation for being hit by pitches; some observers criticized him due to the fact that many of the pitches hit him on his sizable elbow pad. Some have even gone so far as to proclaim him the "king of hit batsmen". On June 29, 2005, Biggio broke the modern-era career hit-by-pitch record, previously held by Don Baylor with 267. He is second to only Hughie Jennings on the all-time list with 287. Despite being hit by a record number of pitches, Biggio never charged the mound, and had no serious injuries as a result of being hit by a pitch.

In his final season, however, Biggio was only hit three times. He was hit fewer times total between 2006 and 2007 (nine times in 2006, total of 12) than he was in 10 of his previous 11 individual seasons. In August 2007, the satirical online newspaper The Onion referenced this in the article "Craig Biggio Blames Media Pressure For Stalling at 285 Hit-By-Pitches". Biggio sent an arm guard to the National Baseball Hall of Fame in recognition of his high hit-by-pitch total.

== Number retirement ==
Craig Biggio's number 7 was retired by the Houston Astros in 2008.

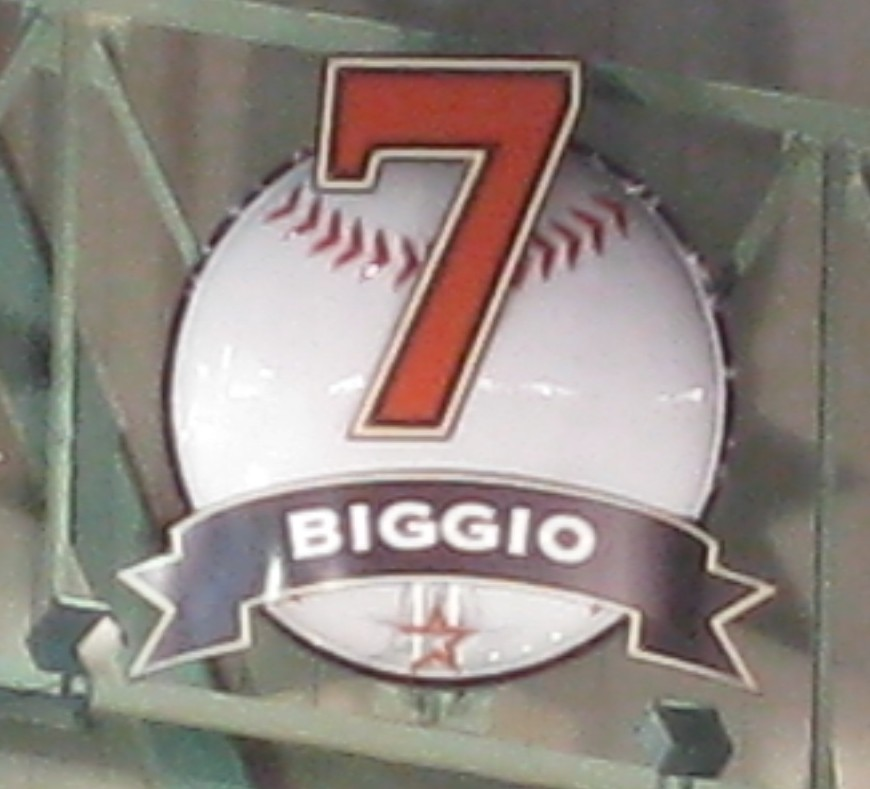
Craig Biggio's retired number 7 at Minute Maid Park. Since the retirement, the number has since been painted to reflect the current Astros color scheme of blue and orange while also adding a Sunshine Kids logo on the side, mimicking his tradition of wearing it on his cap.

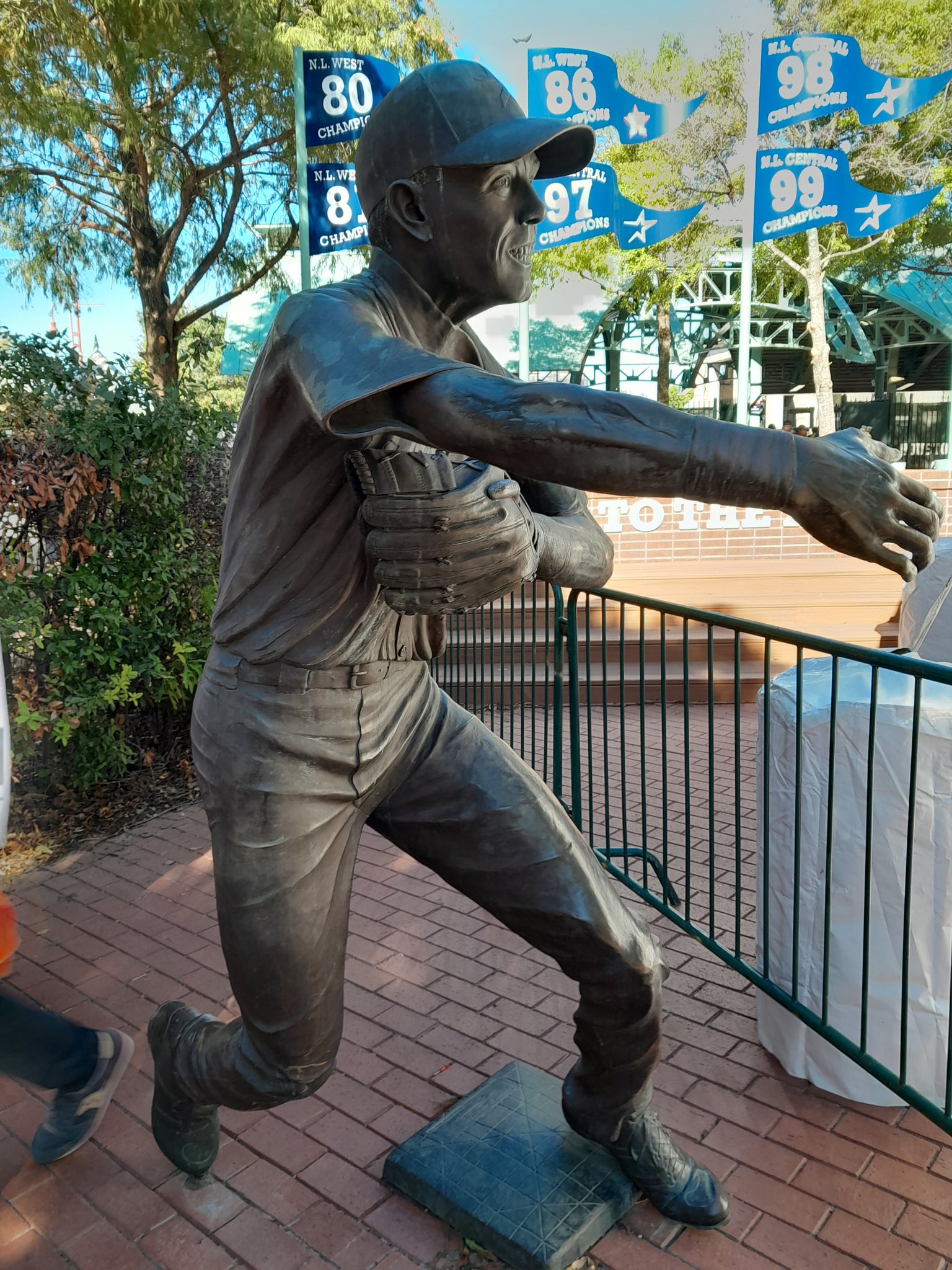
A statue of Biggio was erected at Minute Maid Park in 2003, which resides next to a statue of his teammate Jeff Bagwell.

On May 23, 2008, during a pre-game ceremony, Biggio received an award for MLB.com's This Year in Baseball 2007 Moment of the Year award for his 3,000th hit. On June 28, the Astros announced that they would retire Craig Biggio's jersey. The Houston Astros retired his No. 7 jersey on August 17, 2008, prior to the start of a game versus the Arizona Diamondbacks. Biggio was the ninth player in Astros history to have his number retired.

== Hall of Fame candidacy ==
Biggio first appeared on the writers' ballot for the Baseball Hall of Fame in 2013, the earliest possible year of consideration. He led all Hall of Fame vote-getters by being named on 68.2% of ballots cast. However, this was 39 votes shy of reaching the 75% threshold required by the BBWAA for induction. The following year he once again failed to garner enough votes to be inducted, finishing two votes shy with a voting percentage of 74.8%. This ties him with Nellie Fox (1985) and Pie Traynor (1947) for smallest margin not to get into the Hall, which received criticism.

On January 6, 2015, Biggio was rewarded for his career by being elected to the Hall of Fame. He received 82.7% of the votes and was inducted into the hall on July 26, 2015. He was the first member of the 3,000 hit club to not be elected on the first ballot. On July 29, 2021, Biggio was elected to the Baseball Hall of Fame's board of directors.

== Work in the community ==
Biggio has received awards from various organizations, including the Hutch Award (2005) and being named one of Sporting News' Good Guys (2004). The Hutch Award is given to a player that shows competitiveness and never gives up. Part of the reason Biggio was given the award was for his multiple position changes, but also because of his work in the community and inspiring other teammates to participate as well. He also received the Roberto Clemente Award in 2007. The Roberto Clemente Award "recognizes the player who best exemplifies the game of baseball, sportsmanship, community involvement and the individual's contribution to his team".

Biggio has been a supporter and lead spokesperson for the Sunshine Kids Foundation for over a decade and almost the entirety of his playing career. The organization supports children fighting cancer with exciting activities for themselves and their families. Biggio helps the organization by raising awareness of the organization by wearing a small yellow sun on his cap for interviews, batting practice, and spring training games and by holding a celebrity golf tournament in Houston each spring. Biggio hosts an annual party at Minute Maid Park for about 100 Sunshine Kids to play baseball with Biggio and some of his teammates.

With the 2006 annual golf tournament, Biggio has raised over $2 million for the organization. During 2007 spring training, MLB informed Biggio that he would no longer be allowed to wear the small yellow sun on his cap during interviews, photoshoots, or spring training. Biggio had worn the Sunshine Kids pin for over a decade. This edict was big news in Houston, and Houstonians, long known for their charitable nature and unconditional love of Biggio, reacted very negatively to MLB. After the public uproar, MLB relented and Biggio was allowed to wear the Sunshine Kids pin as he had done since becoming a spokesperson.

== Personal life ==
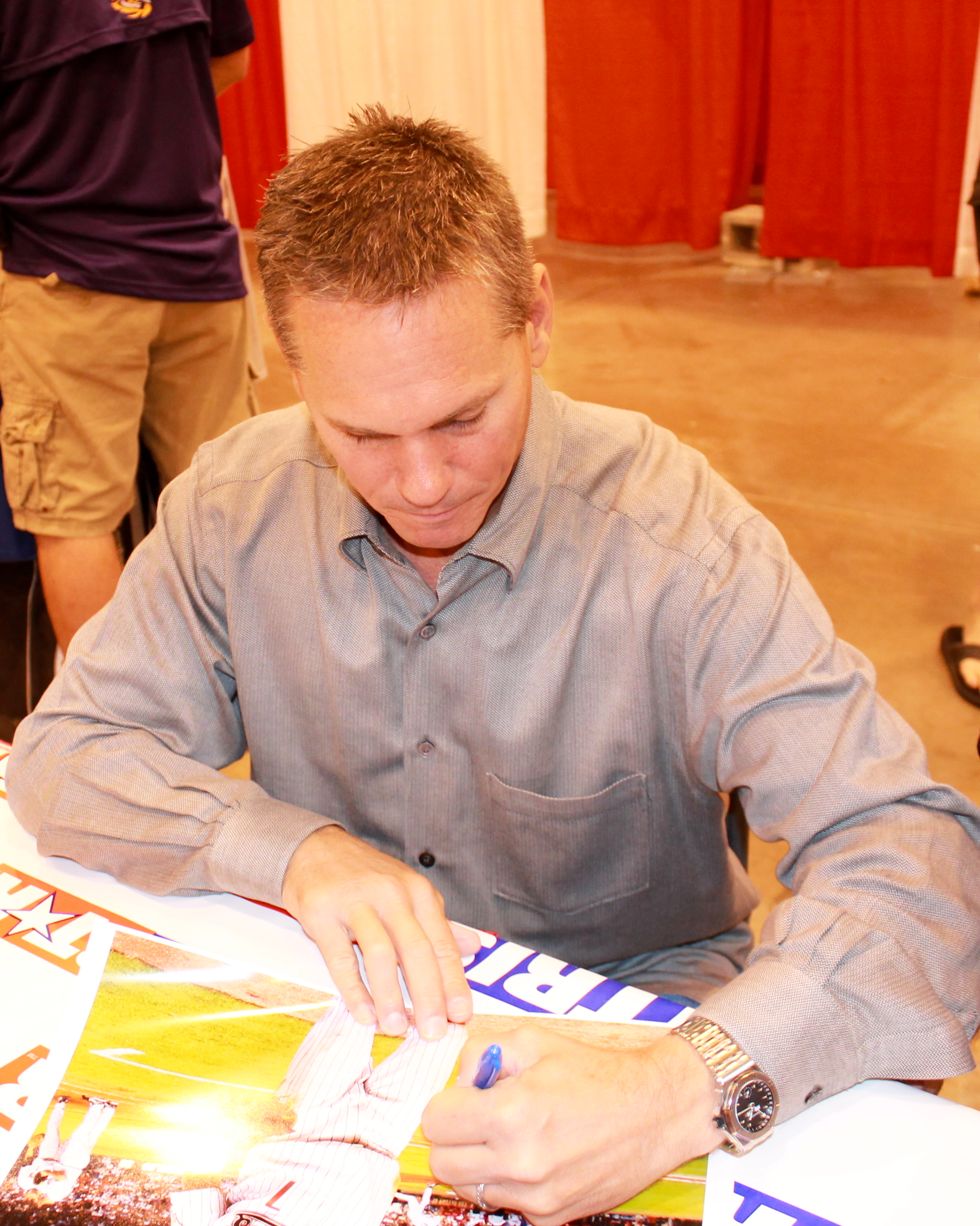
Biggio signs autographs at a Houston sports collectors show in 2014.

Though Biggio played his baseball career both batting and throwing right-handed, he is naturally left-handed.

Biggio was arrested in June 1989 and charged with drunk driving in Harris County, Texas. Astros teammate Ken Caminiti was a passenger in the car at the time of the arrest. At trial, the arresting officer testified that Biggio handed him $200 in what he believed was a bribery attempt. On October 5, he was found guilty of drunk driving. The following day, he was sentenced to two years of probation and 50 hours of community service and fined $350.

Biggio married his wife, the former Patty Egan, in 1990. At that time she was a nurse, but moved on from that career after moving to Houston, where they still live. They have three children: son Conor, born in 1993, son Cavan, born in 1995, and daughter Quinn, born in 1999. Cavan has played in Major League Baseball, finishing fifth in Rookie of the Year voting in 2019. From 2008 to 2013, Biggio was the head baseball coach at St. Thomas High School. Biggio coached St. Thomas to back-to-back Texas Association of Private and Parochial Schools Class 5A state baseball titles in 2010 and 2011.

Both of Biggio's sons played baseball at St. Thomas. Cavan hit a home run in the team's 2011 championship game, while older brother Conor provided the winning offense in St. Thomas' semifinal victory. Both Conor and Cavan attended the University of Notre Dame. Conor played summer baseball for several teams, playing for the North Adams SteepleCats of the New England Collegiate Baseball League in 2012, the North Shore Navigators of the Futures Collegiate Baseball League in 2013, and the New Bedford Bay Sox in 2014.

Biggio and his family have a home in Spring Lake, New Jersey, which they named "Home Plate". Biggio's father-in-law is former Assemblyman Joseph V. Egan, who was a longtime member of the New Jersey legislature until his 2024 retirement at age 86. Biggio is Catholic. He converted to the faith from Methodism.

== Awards and highlights ==
=== Recognition ===
Honors received
Title	Date	Ref
Baseball America Lifetime Achievement Award	2005	
National Baseball Hall of Fame and Museum inductee	2015	
Suffolk Sports Hall of Fame inductee	2002	
Texas Baseball Hall of Fame inductee	2005	
Texas Sports Hall of Fame inductee	2005	

Awards received
Name of award		Times	Dates	Ref
Baseball America National League All-Star at second base		2	1994, 1998	
Branch Rickey Award		1	1997	
Heart & Hustle Award		2	2007, 2008	
Houston Astros Most Valuable Player		1	1998	
Hutch Award		1	2005	
Major League Baseball All-Star
Major League Baseball All-Star	at catcher	1	1991	
Major League Baseball All-Star	at second base	6	1992, 1994–1998	
Rawlings Gold Glove Award at second base		4	1994–1997	
Roberto Clemente Award		1	2007	
Silver Slugger Award
Silver Slugger Award	at catcher	1	1989	
Silver Slugger Award	at second base	4	1994, 1995, 1997, 1998	

=== Annual statistical achievements ===
Notes: Per Baseball-Reference.com. †– led Major Leagues.

National League annual statistical leader
Category	Times	Dates
Doubles leader	3	1994, 1998^{†}, 1999^{†}
Games played leader	3	1992, 1996, 1997
Hit by pitch leader	5	1995^{†}–1997^{†}, 2001^{†}, 2003^{†}
Plate appearance leader	5	1992, 1995^{†}, 1997–1999^{†}
Runs scored leader	2	1995^{†}, 1997^{†}
Stolen base leader	1	1994
Times on base leader	1	1997

=== Other distinctions ===
- Holds National League record for most career lead-off home runs in a career with 53, fourth in MLB behind Rickey Henderson, George Springer, and Alfonso Soriano.
- Second player with 50 stolen bases and 50 doubles in same season (1998). The only other player to accomplish this is fellow Hall of Famer Tris Speaker for the Boston Red Sox in 1912.
- First player in baseball history not to hit into a single double play while playing an entire 162-game season (1997). Two players, Augie Galan (1935) and Dick McAuliffe (1968), had previously played an entire season with the same feat, but did not play in as many games in their respective seasons.
- 146 runs scored in 1997 was most of any National League player since the Phillies' Chuck Klein scored 152 in 1932. Since surpassed by Bagwell, Sammy Sosa, and Ronald Acuña Jr.
- Hit for the cycle against the Colorado Rockies, the sixth in Astros history (April 8, 2002)
  - Craig, alongside his son, Cavan (who hit for the cycle for the Toronto Blue Jays on September 17, 2019), joined Gary Ward and his son Daryle as only the second father and son duo to hit for the cycle in MLB history.
- Astros career leader on list for games played, at-bats, runs scored, hits, doubles, and extra-base hits.
- Holds the record for most regular-season games played before his first World Series appearance with 2,564.

== See also ==
- Biggio's sports bar
- List of second-generation Major League Baseball players
- 3,000 hit club
- Houston Astros award winners and league leaders
- List of Houston Astros team records
- List of Major League Baseball annual doubles leaders
- List of Major League Baseball annual runs scored leaders
- List of Major League Baseball annual stolen base leaders
- List of Major League Baseball doubles records
- List of Major League Baseball career assists leaders
- List of Major League Baseball career doubles leaders
- List of Major League Baseball career hit by pitch leaders
- List of Major League Baseball career hits leaders
- List of Major League Baseball career home run leaders
- List of Major League Baseball career putouts as a second baseman leaders
- List of Major League Baseball career runs batted in leaders
- List of Major League Baseball career runs scored leaders
- List of Major League Baseball career total bases leaders
- List of Major League Baseball career stolen bases leaders
- List of Major League Baseball players who hit for the cycle
- List of Major League Baseball players who spent their entire career with one franchise
- List of Major League Baseball retired numbers

Achievements
Preceded by Miguel Tejada	Hitting for the cycle April 8, 2002	Succeeded by Greg Colbrunn
