= Biggio's =

Sports bar and restaurant in Houston, Texas, U.S.

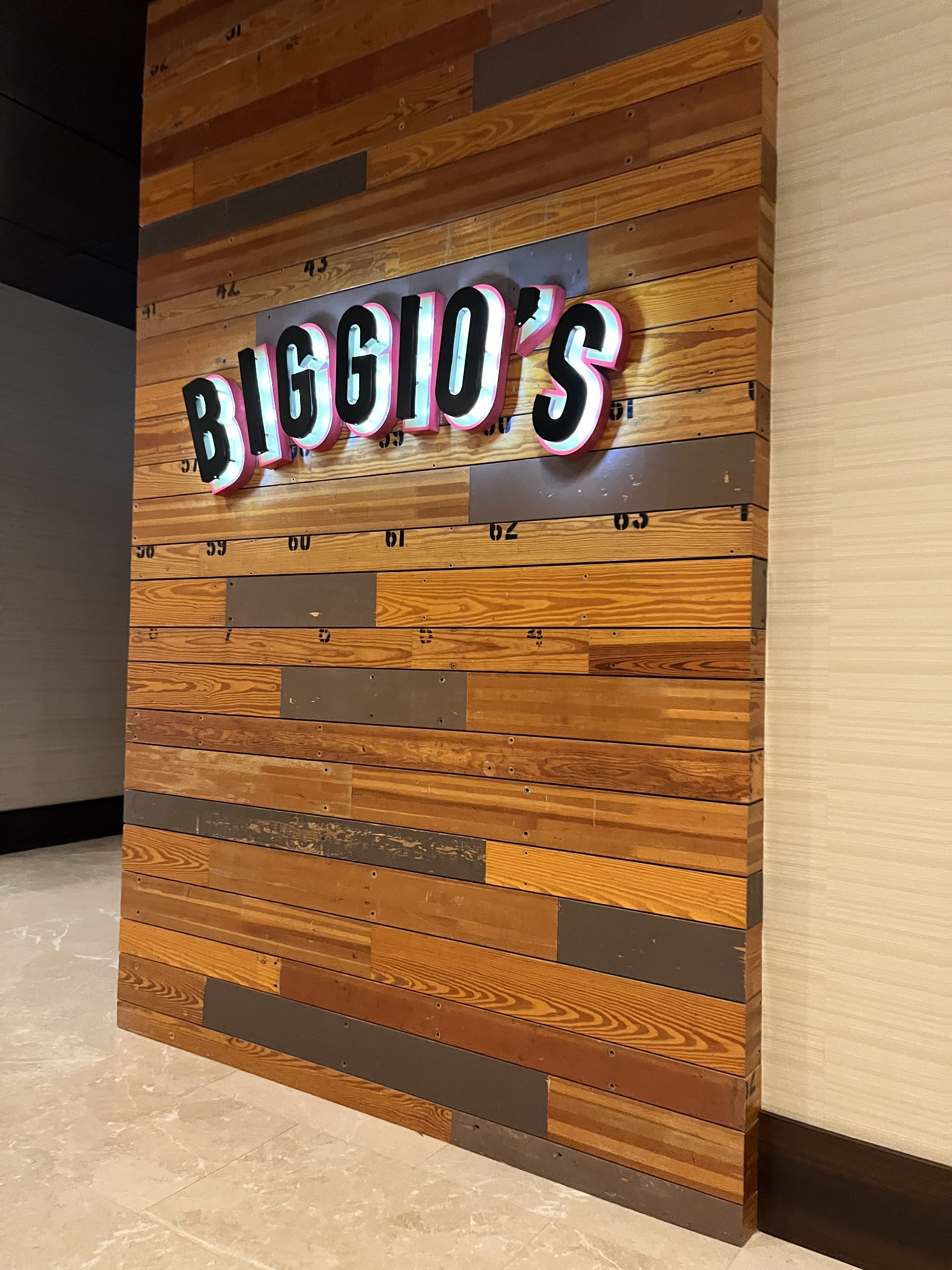
- Signage, 2024
- Interactive map of Biggio's

Restaurant information
- Established: December 26, 2016
- Location: 1777 Walker Street, Houston, Harris, Texas, 77010, United States
- Coordinates: 29.7542°N 95.3584°W

Biggio's is a sports bar and restaurant in Houston, Texas. It has been described as the largest sports bar in Texas. Created in partnership with Craig Biggio and the Houston Astros, as well as Marriott Marquis Houston, the bar has been described as MLB-owned by the Houston Press.

== Description ==
Inspired by and named after former professional baseball sportsman Craig Biggio, who played for the Houston Astros, the restaurant Biggio's is housed in downtown Houston's Marriott Marquis, near the baseball stadium Daikin Park. The two-story eatery displays some of Biggio's sports memorabilia. The interior has television screens as large as 20 feet by 15 feet, as well as reclining seats in an area described as a "mancave". There is a patio overlooking the George R. Brown Convention Center.

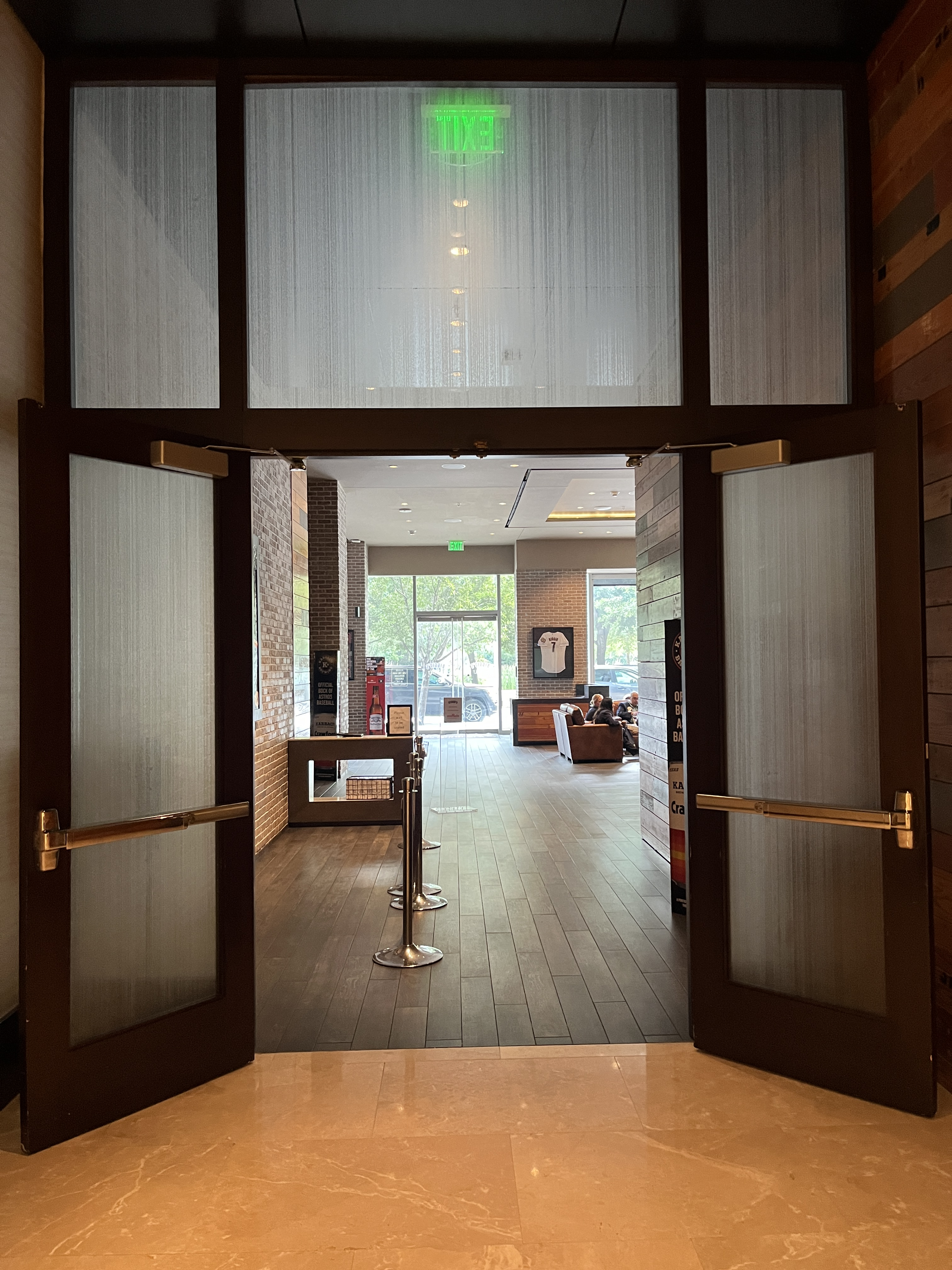
Interior entrance

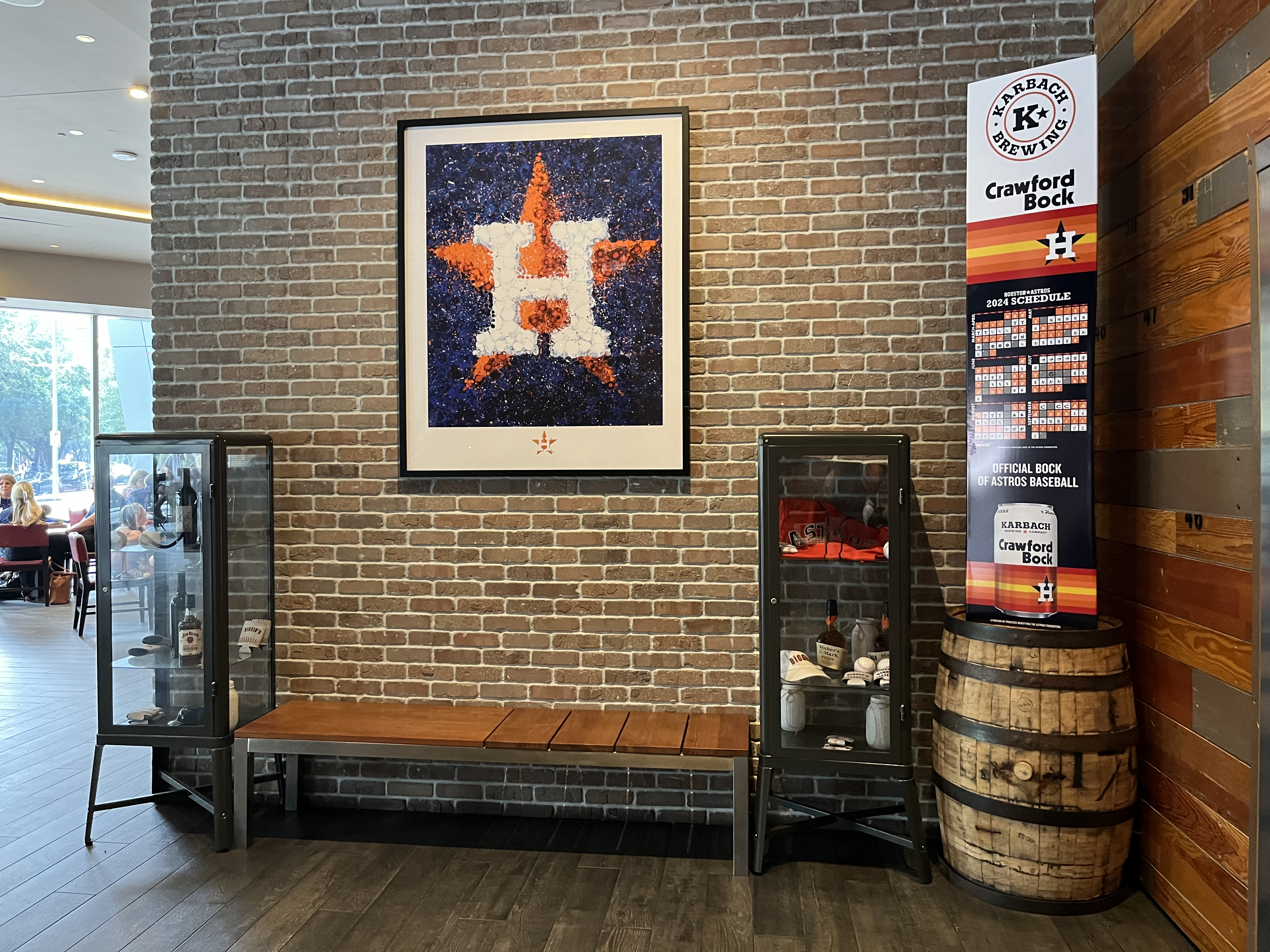
Memorabilia

=== Menu ===
The menu has included bison chili, chicken wings, chicken and waffles, loaded nachos, pizza, pretzels with beer mustard, Texas caviar with tortilla chips, and chips and guacamole or queso. The restaurant has also served sliders (angus with pimento spread, fried chicken with Sriracha honey), hot dogs (American or Sonoran), flatbreads, street tacos, and various salads, including Caesar, steak with blue cheese, and Texas Cobb. Among sandwich options are chopped brisket, a three-cheese grilled cheese, black bean and quinoa burger, and a beef burger. Drink options include beer, cocktails, and wine.

== History ==
The restaurant opened along with the hotel on December 26, 2016.

== Reception ==
Greg Morago of the Houston Chronicle was critical of the restaurant upon opening. Brooke Viggiano has called Biggio's "sleek" and "upscale", and included the restaurant in Thrillist's 2023 overview of the best places to watch the Super Bowl in the city.

== See also ==
- List of restaurants in Houston
