= Killer B's (Houston Astros) =

Players in the Houston Astros baseball team

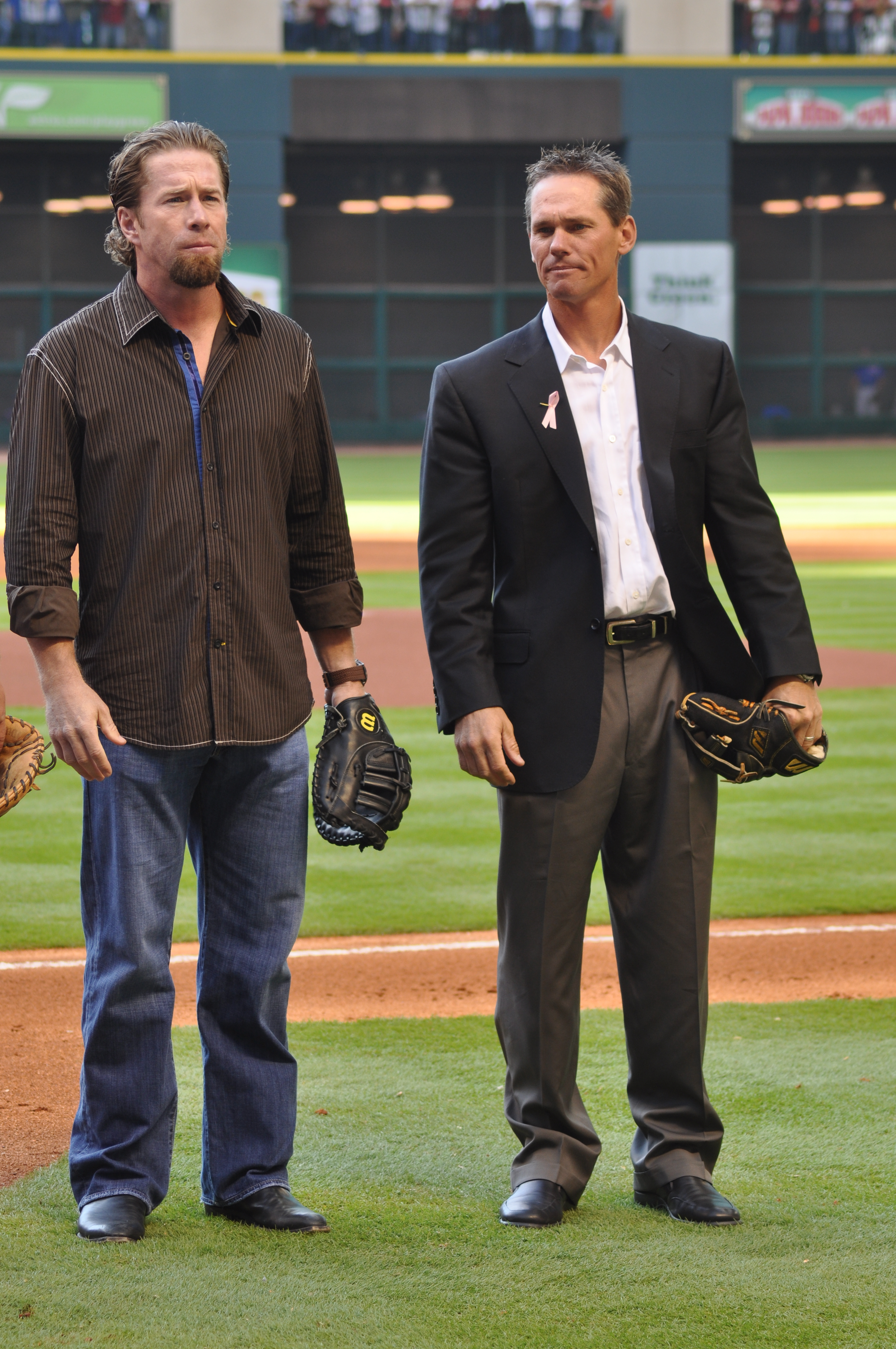
Jeff Bagwell and Craig Biggio were the core of the "Killer B's"

The Killer B's were players on the Houston Astros whose surnames started with the letter B. It also refers to the era of Astros baseball from 1997 to 2005 that saw the team reach the postseason six times in nine seasons with four National League Central division titles, two Wild Card appearances and one National League pennant, which was the most successful era in team history until the 2010s. In fact, from 1994 to 2006, the Astros finished first or second in their division in each year except 2000. Three Killer B's, Carlos Beltran, Craig Biggio and Jeff Bagwell, are in the National Baseball Hall of Fame, with the latter two being inducted as members of the Astros.

== History ==
The name "Killer B's" was first used on March 31, 1996, when it referenced Jeff Bagwell, Craig Biggio, Sean Berry, and Derek Bell. The name carried on for several years even after Berry and Bell's departure coinciding with Lance Berkman's arrival in 1999. Although there were several other "Killer B's," the core players were either Biggio–Bagwell–Bell or Biggio–Bagwell–Berkman. In Wins Above Replacement, the Biggio–Bagwell–Bell trio are among the all-time best trios with the same letter in their last names. In the Killer Bs era, the Astros were managed by Larry Dierker (1997–2001), Jimy Williams (2002–2004), and Phil Garner (2004–2007).

=== Beginnings ===
Craig Biggio came up from the Astros as a star catcher from Seton Hall University (having played the position at the request of the head coach due to needing one), having been drafted as the 22nd overall pick in the 1987 Major League Baseball draft. A year later, midway through the season, he was called up to the majors. In 1989, he began the season as the starting catcher, and he won his first Silver Slugger Award that year. His speed would serve him well in stolen bases, and management wanted to save his legs from the rigors of catching, trying him part-time in the outfield the next year. By 1992, he accepted management's desire to have him not play catcher, and he instead served as second baseman. The result proved valuable, as he was named to six All-Star Games at the position; Biggio was the first player to ever be named an All-Star as a both a catcher and second base. Jeff Bagwell (born in Boston, Massachusetts) had attracted fair notice for his exploits for the University of Hartford at third base, although he was drafted by the Boston Red Sox in the fourth round of the 1989 draft. The following year, the Red Sox desired relief pitching to try and contend for the playoffs, and they searched for help from the Astros with their pitcher in Larry Andersen; a New England region scout for the Astros recommended Bagwell as a return piece, having noticed his talent (Bagwell, while a .300 batter in his minor league career, did not look like a candidate to unseat the starting third baseman in Wade Boggs anytime soon). On August 30, he was sent to the Astros for Andersen, who pitched well in his lone season with Boston. Although the Astros had a starting third baseman in Ken Caminiti, Bagwell's promise as a player in spring training for 1991 convinced them to try him at first base in the majors for Opening Day. He rewarded the Astros by batting .294 with fifteen home runs while being named the National League Rookie of the Year. Bagwell and Biggio would play 4,714 games together before they reached the World Series for their first and only time as major league players.

Unlike Biggio and Bagwell, Derek Bell and Sean Berry did not start their careers with the Astros. Bell had started with the Toronto Blue Jays in 1991, playing two seasons before being traded to the San Diego Padres, where he thrived for two fair seasons. In December 1994, however, he was part of a large trade that involved 12 players that sent Bell and five others to Houston. He rewarded the Astros by batting .334 in 1995 while finishing with MVP votes in 112 games played. However his production would dip and flow over the next four seasons, which included batting .314 in 1998 before dropping to his lowest full season average of .236 the next season, and he played over 130 games twice in five seasons. Berry had spent time with the Kansas City Royals and Montreal Expos before being traded to the Astros in 1996. In three seasons with the Astros, he played 330 games and batted .283.

Lance Berkman was a noted prospect that dazzled as a member of the Rice Owls baseball team that went to the College World Series in 1997. As such, he was drafted as the 16th overall pick in the Major League draft. He spent the next two years in the minors before being called up to the majors in July 1999. A first baseman all throughout his baseball career, he was slotted to the outfield to garner playing time as Bagwell was already set in the position. He played just 34 games in 1999 before playing minor league ball for a time until he was sent back to the majors for 2000. He batted .297 that year and stayed in the majors from then on, which included an All-Star selection the following year among other distinctions. In Game 4 of the 2005 National League Division Series, he belted a grand slam to help spark a rally that saw them overcome a 6-1 deficit to eventually win in eighteen innings.

Carlos Beltrán was a second round selection in the 1995 draft by the Kansas City Royals. Although he won the Rookie of the Year award upon his debut to the majors in 1998, he battled injuries and the pains of a small market club in the midst of futility (the Royals did not make the postseason from 1986 to 2013). Contract negotiations for a long term deal stalled while trade rumors circled both 2003 and 2004. A .278 batter with fifteen home runs, Beltran seemed a worthy trade piece as the All-Star break loomed in June. On the 24th of that month, the Royals took part in a three team trade that saw them acquire three players (most notably Octavio Dotel) while trading with the Astros and the Oakland Athletics that sent Beltran to Houston. He proceeded to play 90 games with the Astros while batting .258, hitting 23 home runs while adding to his stolen base total (where he stole 42, with 28 from Houston). He saved his best for the postseason, hitting eight home runs to tie the record for most hit in one postseason, which included two in Game 5 of the Division Series against the Atlanta Braves, which helped seal the first ever postseason victory for the Astros. He hit a home run in each of the first four games of the ensuing NLCS, but the Astros lost in seven games. In those twelve games, he batted .435 while driving in fourteen with 21 runs scored.

Chris Burke helped the Tennessee Volunteers baseball team to the College World Series in 2001, and as such he was a fair prospect for the draft that year. He was selected as the 10th overall pick by the Astros. After debuting in the majors in July 2004, he was thought of as a key prospect for the next year. He would bat .248 in 108 games, most notably having an eleven-game hitting streak in the summer. In the 2005 National League Division Series, he would have his most famous moment as an Astro. In Game 4, batting in the 18th inning against Joey Devine, he slammed a home run that ended the series and advanced the Astros to the NLCS for a second straight year. It ended up being his most famous home run of his career.

== Aftermath ==
Biggio played until he announced his retirement effective at the end of the 2007 season. He collected 3,060 hits by the end of his career to go along with 291 home runs (53 as a leadoff hitter, a National League record), seven All-Star Game appearances and five Silver Slugger Awards. He was inducted into the National Baseball Hall of Fame and Museum in 2015. Bagwell, bothered by trouble with his shoulder, never played baseball again after the end of the 2005 World Series. However, he was on hand to see Biggio reach 3,000 hits on June 28, 2007, meeting him on the field after the historic moment. Bagwell ended his career with 449 home runs and 1,529 runs batted in (RBI), and he was inducted into the Hall of Fame in 2017. Berkman was traded by the Astros to the New York Yankees in 2010, and he ended his career in 2013 after signing a one-day contract with the Astros to retire. A lifetime .293 hitter, he hit 366 home runs with 1,234 RBIs. The 2005 season was the last postseason appearance for the Astros for ten years.

Beltran would spend most of the next twelve years after 2004 as a member of the New York Mets, but he would find his way back to the Astros in free agency after the end of the Killer B's era. After the end of the 2016 season, he was signed to a one-year deal to play as the designated hitter. His key contribution that year was an RBI double in the ninth inning of Game 4 of the American League Division Series that was the deciding run in a 5-4 win that gave the Astros their first postseason series victory in thirteen years. Beltran retired after the season, which ended with the Astros winning the World Series; coincidentally, a star player for that Astros team had a name that started with a "B" in Alex Bregman, who provided the winning hit to end Game 5 in the seven-game series victory. Beltran would go on to open a successful chain of frozen yogurt shops in the Houston and greater Houston area named Chiller Bee, a play off of the name Killer B’s.

In the 2021 Houston Astros season, when the team clinched their ticket to the postseason, it clinched their sixth postseason appearance in the past seven seasons, which matched the "Killer B's" era. The 2022 team reached the postseason once again, thereby topping the Killer B era for most playoff appearances in any span of seasons. Dusty Baker became the third Astros manager to reach the postseason three straight times and only the second to do so in his first three seasons after Larry Dierker.

== Killer B's in chronological order ==
Starting with Biggio's arrival, here are the Killer B's in chronological order:

- Craig Biggio (1988–2007)
- Jeff Bagwell (1991–2005)
- Derek Bell (1995–1999)
- Sean Berry (1996–1998)
- Tim Bogar (1997–2000)
- Lance Berkman (1999–2010)
- Eric Bruntlett (2003–2007)
- Brandon Backe (2004-2009)
- Carlos Beltran (2004, 2017)
- Chris Burke (2004–2007)
