= Sean Berry =

American baseball player & coach (born 1966)

- Third baseman
- Born: March 22, 1966 (age 60); Santa Monica, California, U.S.
- Batted: Right Threw: Right

MLB debut
- September 17, 1990, for the Kansas City Royals

Last MLB appearance
- July 24, 2000, for the Boston Red Sox

MLB statistics
- Batting average: .272
- Home runs: 81
- Runs batted in: 369
- Stats at Baseball Reference

Teams
- Kansas City Royals (1990–1991); Montreal Expos (1992–1995); Houston Astros (1996–1998); Milwaukee Brewers (1999–2000); Boston Red Sox (2000)

Sean Robert Berry (born March 22, 1966) is an American former professional baseball third baseman and current coach. He played in Major League Baseball (MLB) for several teams from 1990 to 2000.

== Early life ==
Berry was born in Santa Monica, California, and attended West High School in Torrance, California. He was drafted out of high school by the Boston Red Sox in the fourth round of the June 1984 draft, but he chose to attend UCLA. He was drafted again in 1986, this time in the first round (ninth overall) by the Kansas City Royals.

== Career ==
Berry played in the minor leagues until 1990, when he was promoted to the Royals after hitting .292 with 14 home runs and 77 runs batted in for the Double-A Memphis Chicks. He split time between the major leagues and minor leagues until 1992, when he was sent to the Montreal Expos as part of a multiplayer trade. Berry played between 103 and 122 games per year for the Expos between 1993 and 1995, hitting double-digit home runs each season and batting .318 in 1995.

Before the 1996 season, the Expos traded Berry to the Astros for Raúl Chávez and Dave Veres. He was a member of the Houston Astros' original "Killer B's", along with Jeff Bagwell, Craig Biggio, and Derek Bell. He achieved career highs in 1996 with 132 games played, 17 home runs and 95 runs batted in. He played for the Astros through 1998, then spent time with the Red Sox and Milwaukee Brewers. His last year as a player was 2001, when he appeared in the minor leagues for the Toronto Blue Jays organization.

In 2003, Berry became a coach in minor league baseball for the Round Rock Express and then was the Astros minor league hitting coordinator before becoming the Astros hitting coach in 2006. On May 8, 2009, Berry went through a surgery to remove his cancerous kidney; he returned to the team three weeks later.

Berry served as the Astros' hitting coach until July 11, 2010, when he was fired and replaced with former Astros teammate Jeff Bagwell. At the time of the switch the Astros had an NL-worst OBP (.295) and SLG (.348). On September 9, 2010, the San Diego Padres hired Berry as their minor league hitting coordinator, replacing Tony Muser.

Berry was named as the hitting coach for the AA Jacksonville Jumbo Shrimp of the Miami Marlins organization for the 2019 season. He was hired by the Baltimore Orioles organization to be the Norfolk Tides hitting coach prior to the 2020 season.

Preceded by Jeff Bagwell	Houston Astros hitting coach 2007-2010	Succeeded by Gary Gaetti
