= Houston Astros award winners and league leaders =

This is a list of award winners and league leaders for the Houston Astros, an American professional baseball team based in Houston. The Astros compete in Major League Baseball (MLB) as a member club of the American League (AL), having moved to the league in 2013 after spending their first 51 seasons in the National League (NL).

The Astros feature fourteen total personnel who have been inducted into the National Baseball Hall of Fame and Museum, three of whom were inducted as a Houston Astro, first Craig Biggio in 2015. Two players have won Most Valuable Player (MVP) Awards, along with four Cy Young Award winners, and three Rookie of the Year Award winners. Two players have won an annual batting championship, while eight pitchers have led the league in earned run average (ERA).

== Team awards ==
Team awards won by Houston Colt .45s/Astros
Award	Description	No.	Years	Ref.
All-Star Game host		3	1968, 1986, 2004	
Baseball America Organization of the Year		1	2001	
Commissioner's Trophy	World Series champions	2	2017, 2022	
Gold Glove Team	Best fielding team in NL or AL	1	2021	
Outstanding Team ESPY Award	Best team in sports	1	2018	
Warren C. Giles Trophy	AL pennant winner	4	2017, 2019, 2021, 2022	
William Harridge Trophy	NL pennant winner	1	2005	
Wilson Defensive Team of the Year	Best fielding team in MLB	1	2019	

== National Baseball Hall of Fame honors ==
=== Hall of Fame inductees ===
Houston Colt .45s/Astros elected to the Baseball Hall of Fame
Individual	Position	Colt .45s / Astros career					Induction	
Individual	Position	Uni.	Yr.	Gm.	St.	Fin.	Induction	
**Jeff Bagwell**	First baseman	**5**	15	2,150	1991	2005	2017	Plaque
Carlos Beltrán	Center fielder	15	2	219	2004	2017	2026	Plaque
Yogi Berra (Note: Berra served a major league coach for the Astros; his induction into the Hall of Fame recognized his playing career with the New York Yankees prior to his Astros tenure.)	Catcher	8	4	648	1986	1989	1972	Plaque
**Craig Biggio**	Second baseman	**7** (Note: Also wore number 4 (1988–89).)	20	2,850	1988	2007	2015	Plaque
Leo Durocher	Manager	2	2	193	1972	1973	1994	Plaque
Nellie Fox	Second baseman	2	2	154	1964	1965	1997	Plaque
Randy Johnson	Starting pitcher	51	1	11	1998	1998	2015	Plaque
Jeff Kent	Second baseman	12	2	275	2003	2004	2026	Plaque
Eddie Mathews	Third baseman	11	1	101	1967	1967	1978	Plaque
Joe Morgan	Second baseman	18 (Note: Also wore numbers 12 (1963), 35 (1964), and 8 (1980).)	10 (Note: Morgan played two separate stints for the Colts .45s/Astros, first from 1963–1971, and again in 1980.)	1,032	1963	1980	1990	Plaque
Robin Roberts	Starting pitcher	38	2	23	1965	1966	1976	Plaque
Iván Rodríguez	Catcher	77	1	93	2009	2009	2017	Plaque
Nolan Ryan	Starting pitcher	**34**	9	282	1980	1988	1999	Plaque
Don Sutton	Starting pitcher	20	2	50	1981	1982	1998	Plaque
**Billy Wagner**	Relief pitcher	**13**	9	464	1995	2003	2025	Plaque
Bold: Names inducted as a Houston Astro; uniform numbers retired by team
See also: Members of the Baseball Hall of Fame • Sources:

=== Ford C. Frick Award recipients ===
Houston Colt .45s/Astros Frick Award winners
Broadcaster		Start	Finish	HOF
**Gene Elston**	Biography	1962	1986	2006
Al Helfer	Biography	1962	1962	2019
Milo Hamilton	Biography	1985	2012	1992
Harry Kalas	Biography	1965	1970	2002
See also: Ford C. Frick Award • Source:

== Major League Baseball awards ==
=== Postseason awards ===
Postseason award winners for the Houston Astros
Category		Event	Individual
Babe Ruth Award		2017	Jose Altuve
Babe Ruth Award		2017	Justin Verlander
Babe Ruth Award		2022	Jeremy Peña
League Championship Series MVP	NLCS	1986	Mike Scott
League Championship Series MVP	NLCS	2005	Roy Oswalt
League Championship Series MVP	ALCS	2017	Justin Verlander
League Championship Series MVP	ALCS	2019	Jose Altuve
League Championship Series MVP	ALCS	2021	Yordan Alvarez
League Championship Series MVP	ALCS	2022	Jeremy Peña
World Series MVP		2017	George Springer
World Series MVP		2022	Jeremy Peña

=== Annual awards ===
==== Most Valuable Player Award (MVP) ====
Year	Player	Position	Lg.	No.
1994	Jeff Bagwell	First baseman	NL	1
2017	Jose Altuve	Second baseman	AL	1
2026	Yordan Alvarez	Designated hitter	AL	1
MLB Most Valuable Player Award • Sources:

==== Cy Young Award ====
Year	Pitcher	Role	Lg.	No.
1986	Mike Scott	Starting pitcher	NL	1
2004	Roger Clemens	Starting pitcher	NL	1
2015	Dallas Keuchel	Starting pitcher	AL	1
2019	Justin Verlander	Starting pitcher	AL	1
2022	Justin Verlander	Starting pitcher	AL	2
Cy Young Award • Sources:

==== Rookie of the Year Award (ROY) ====
Year	Player	Position	Lg.
1991	Jeff Bagwell	First baseman	NL
2015	Carlos Correa	Shortstop	AL
2019	Yordan Alvarez	Designated hitter	AL
MLB Rookie of the Year Award • Ref:

==== Manager of the Year Award (MOY) ====
Year	Name	Record	Lg.	No.
1986	Hal Lanier	96–66	NL	1
1998	Larry Dierker	102–60	NL	1
MLB Manager of the Year Award • Ref:

==== Hank Aaron Award ====
Year	Player	Position	Lg.	No.
2017	Jose Altuve	Second baseman	AL	1
2026	Yordan Alvarez	Designated hitter	AL	1
Hank Aaron Award • Ref:

==== Rolaids Relief Man Award ====
Year	Pitcher	ERA	W	L	Sv	Lg.	No.
1999	Billy Wagner	1.57	4	1	39	NL	1
Rolaids Relief Man Award (Note: Discontinued in 2012 and replaced by the MLB Reliever of the Year Award in 2014.) • Ref:

==== Comeback Player of the Year ====
Year	Player	Position	Lg.	No.
2022	Justin Verlander	Starting pitcher	AL	1
2026	Yordan Alvarez	Designated hitter	AL	1
MLB Comeback Player of the Year Award • Source:

==== Edgar Martinez Outstanding Designated Hitter ====
Year	Player	AVG	HR	RBI	No.
2026	Yordan Alvarez	.316	42	105	1
Edgar Martinez Award • Source:

==== All-MLB Team ====
Year	Player	Team	Pos.	No.
2019	Gerrit Cole	First	SP	1
2019	Justin Verlander	First	SP	1
2019	Zack Greinke (Note: Acquired from the Arizona Diamondbacks prior to the trade deadline in 2019. Greinke's statistics for the entire season were considered for his All-MLB Team and Wilson awards selection, while the Gold Glove and Silver Sluggers Awards were both earned for his play in the National League. Greinke appeared in 26 of 36 total games with the Diamondbacks that season, and all 10 remaining games were with the Astros.)	Second	SP	1
2019	Jose Altuve	Second	2B	1
2019	Alex Bregman	Second	3B	1
2019	Yordan Alvarez	Second	DH	1
2021	Kyle Tucker	Second	OF	1
2021	Yordan Alvarez	Second	DH	2
2022	Framber Valdez	First	SP	1
2022	Justin Verlander	First	SP	2
2022	Jose Altuve	First	2B	2
2022	Yordan Alvarez	First	DH	3
2022	Ryan Pressly	Second	RP	1
2022	Kyle Tucker	Second	OF	2
2023	Kyle Tucker	Second	OF	3
2023	Yordan Alvarez	Second	DH	4
2024	Framber Valdez	Second	SP	2
2024	Jose Altuve	Second	2B	3
2024	Yordan Alvarez	Second	DH	5
2025	Hunter Brown	Second	SP	1
2026	Yordan Alvarez	First	DH	6
All-MLB Team • Sources:

==== All-Star Game honors ====
All-Star Game selectees
Player	No.	First	Other selections	Last	Starts
Jose Altuve (Note: Altuve is the only player in major league history to represent both the National (NL) and American Leagues (AL) in an All-Star Game as a member of the same team. His 2012 appearance was on the NL roster, while all subsequent appearances have been with the AL.)	9	2012	2014–2018, 2021, 2022	2024	5
Craig Biggio	7	1991	1992, 1994–1997	1998	4
Lance Berkman	5	2001	2002, 2004, 2006	2008	2
Turk Farrell	4	1962	1962², 1964	1965	0
César Cedeño	4	1972	1973, 1974	1976	2
Jeff Bagwell	4	1994	1996, 1997	1999	2
Yordan Alvarez	4	2022	2023, 2024	2026	2
Mike Scott	3	1986	1987	1989	1
Billy Wagner	3	1999	2001	2003	0
Roy Oswalt	3	2005	2006	2007	0
George Springer	3	2017	2018	2019	2
Justin Verlander	3	2018	2019	2022	1
Kyle Tucker	3	2022	2023	2024	0
Note: Includes players with three or more selections as member of Colt .45s/Astros; MLB All-Star Game • Sources:

All-Star Game MVP
Game	Player	Pos.	Final
2018	Alex Bregman	3B	AL 8–6 NL
MLB All-Star Game MVP Award • Source:

All-Star Game winning pitchers
Team	Pitcher	Inn.	Final	Box
2022 AL	Framber Valdez	3	AL 3–2 NL	
List of MLB All-Star Games

All-Star Game managers
Name	Team	Final	Box
Phil Garner	2006 NL	NL 2–3 AL	
A. J. Hinch	2018 AL	AL 8–6 NL	
Dusty Baker	2022 AL	AL 3–2 NL	
Dusty Baker	2023 AL	AL 2–3 NL	
MLB All-Star Game managers

==== Gold and Platinum Glove Awards ====
Year	Player	Position	Lg.	No.
1962	Bobby Shantz	Pitcher	NL	1
1970	Doug Rader	Third baseman	NL	1
1971	Doug Rader	Third baseman	NL	2
1972	Doug Rader	Third baseman	NL	3
1972	César Cedeño	Outfielder	NL	1
1973	Doug Rader	Third baseman	NL	4
1973	Roger Metzger	Shortstop	NL	1
1973	César Cedeño	Outfielder	NL	2
1974	Doug Rader	Third baseman	NL	5
1974	César Cedeño	Outfielder	NL	3
1975	César Cedeño	Outfielder	NL	4
1976	César Cedeño	Outfielder	NL	5
1994	Jeff Bagwell	First baseman	NL	1
1994	Craig Biggio	Second baseman	NL	1
1995	Craig Biggio	Second baseman	NL	2
1996	Craig Biggio	Second baseman	NL	3
1997	Craig Biggio	Second baseman	NL	4
2001	Brad Ausmus	Catcher	NL	1
2002	Brad Ausmus	Catcher	NL	2
2006	Brad Ausmus	Catcher	NL	3
2009	Michael Bourn	Outfielder	NL	1
2010	Michael Bourn	Outfielder	NL	2
2014	Dallas Keuchel	Pitcher	AL	1
2015	Dallas Keuchel	Pitcher	AL	2
2015	Jose Altuve	Second baseman	AL	1
2016	Dallas Keuchel	Pitcher	AL	3
2018	Dallas Keuchel	Pitcher	AL	4
2019	Zack Greinke	Pitcher	NL	1
2021^{Tm}	Yuli Gurriel	First baseman	AL	1
2021^{Tm}	Carlos Correa^{Pt}	Shortstop	AL	1
2022	Jeremy Peña	Shortstop	AL	1
2022	Kyle Tucker	Outfielder	AL	1
2023	Mauricio Dubón	Utility player (Note: Awarded in MLB since 2022.)	AL	1
2024	Alex Bregman	Third baseman	AL	1
2025	Mauricio Dubón	Utility player	AL	2
2026	Christian Walker	First baseman	AL	1
Key
^{Pt}	Platinum Glove Award winner (Note: Awarded in MLB since 2011.)			
^{Tm}	Gold Glove Team (Note: Awarded in MLB since 2020.)			
Gold Glove Award • Sources:

==== Silver Slugger Award ====
Year	Player	Position	Lg.	No.
1983	Dickie Thon	Shorstop	NL	1
1983	José Cruz	Outfielder	NL	1
1984	José Cruz	Outfielder	NL	2
1986	Glenn Davis	First baseman	NL	1
1989	Craig Biggio	Catcher	NL	1
1994	Jeff Bagwell	First baseman	NL	1
1994	Craig Biggio	Second baseman	NL	2
1995	Craig Biggio	Second baseman	NL	3
1997	Jeff Bagwell	First baseman	NL	2
1997	Craig Biggio	Second baseman	NL	4
1998	Craig Biggio	Second baseman	NL	5
1998	Moisés Alou	Outfielder	NL	1
1999	Mike Hampton	Pitcher	NL	1
1999	Jeff Bagwell	First baseman	NL	3
2005	Morgan Ensberg	Third baseman	NL	1
2007	Carlos Lee	Outfielder	NL	1
2014	Jose Altuve	Second baseman	AL	1
2015	Jose Altuve	Second baseman	AL	2
2016	Jose Altuve	Second baseman	AL	3
2017	Jose Altuve	Second baseman	AL	4
2017	George Springer	Outfielder	AL	1
2018	Jose Altuve	Second baseman	AL	5
2019	Zack Greinke	Pitcher	NL	1
2019	Alex Bregman	Third baseman	AL	1
2019	George Springer	Outfielder	AL	2
2022	Jose Altuve	Second baseman	AL	6
2022	Yordan Alvarez	Designated hitter	AL	1
2023	Kyle Tucker	Outfielder	AL	1
2024	Jose Altuve	Second baseman	AL	7
2026	Yordan Alvarez	Designated hitter	AL	2
Silver Slugger Award • Sources:

=== Monthly awards ===
==== Player of the Month ====
Yr.	Month	Player	Lg.	No.
1972	May	Bob Watson	NL	1
1972	June	César Cedeño	NL	1
1975	May	Bob Watson	NL	2
1977	September	César Cedeño	NL	2
1981	May	Art Howe	NL	1
1984	July	José Cruz	NL	1
1986	June	Kevin Bass	NL	1
1993	May	Jeff Bagwell	NL	1
1994	June	Jeff Bagwell	NL	2
1994	July	Jeff Bagwell	NL	3
1996	May	Jeff Bagwell	NL	4
2000	September	Richard Hidalgo	NL	1
2001	July	Jeff Bagwell	NL	5
2004	May	Lance Berkman	NL	1
2008	May	Lance Berkman	NL	2
2016	June	Jose Altuve	AL	1
2017	May	Carlos Correa	AL	1
2017	July	Jose Altuve	AL	2
2018	June	Alex Bregman	AL	1
2019	July	Yuli Gurriel	AL	1
2019	August	Alex Bregman	AL	2
2021	September	Kyle Tucker	AL	1
2022	June	Yordan Alvarez	AL	1
2022	August	Alex Bregman	AL	3
2023	September	Yordan Alvarez	AL	2
2026	April	Yordan Alvarez	AL	3
2026	July	Yordan Alvarez	AL	4
MLB Player of the Month Award • Sources:

==== Pitcher of the Month ====
Yr.	Month	Pitcher	Lg.	No.
1978	July	J. R. Richard	NL	1
1979	April	Ken Forsch	NL	1
1979	May	Joe Niekro	NL	1
1979	June	Joaquín Andújar	NL	1
1979	September	J. R. Richard	NL	2
1980	April	J. R. Richard	NL	3
1982	August	Nolan Ryan	NL	1
1984	May	Nolan Ryan	NL	2
1989	June	Mike Scott	NL	1
1990	July	Danny Darwin	NL	1
1993	June	Darryl Kile	NL	1
1994	May	Doug Drabek	NL	1
1997	July	Darryl Kile	NL	2
1998	August	Randy Johnson	NL	1
1998	September	Randy Johnson	NL	2
2001	April	Wade Miller	NL	1
2002	August	Roy Oswalt	NL	1
2004	April	Roger Clemens	NL	1
2005	July	Andy Pettitte	NL	1
2005	September	Andy Pettitte	NL	2
2006	September	Roy Oswalt	NL	2
2009	July	Wandy Rodríguez	NL	1
2015	April	Dallas Keuchel	AL	1
2015	May	Dallas Keuchel	AL	2
2015	July	Scott Kazmir	AL	1
2015	August	Dallas Keuchel	AL	3
2017	April	Dallas Keuchel	AL	4
2017	May	Lance McCullers Jr.	AL	1
2018	May	Justin Verlander	AL	1
2019	June	Gerrit Cole	AL	1
2019	July	Gerrit Cole	AL	2
2019	September	Gerrit Cole	AL	3
2025	June	Hunter Brown	AL	1
2026	May	Spencer Arrighetti	AL	1
MLB Pitcher of the Month Award • Sources:

==== Rookie of the Month ====
Yr.	Month	Player	Lg.	No.
2001	August	Roy Oswalt	NL	1
2002	July	Kirk Saarloos	NL	1
2007	May	Hunter Pence	NL	1
2014	May	George Springer	AL	1
2014	September	Collin McHugh	AL	1
2015	June	Carlos Correa	AL	1
2017	July	Yuli Gurriel	AL	1
2019	June	Yordan Alvarez	AL	1
2019	July	Yordan Alvarez	AL	2
2019	August	Yordan Alvarez	AL	3
2024	August	Spencer Arrighetti	AL	1
MLB Rookie of the Month Award • Sources:

==== Reliever of the Month ====
Yr.	Month	Pitcher	Lg.	No.
2005	July	Brad Lidge	MLB	1
2008	August	José Valverde	MLB	1
2024	August	Josh Hader	AL	1
2025	June	Josh Hader	AL	2
2026	August	Josh Hader	AL	3
MLB Delivery Man of the Month (Note: Awarded by MLB from 2005 to 2013 to one reliever in the major leagues with sponsorship from DHL.) • Reliever of the Month • Sources:

=== Awards for leadership, inspiration, and community service ===
Honors for leadership, inspiration, and community service
Category	Description	Year	Individual	Ref.
Branch Rickey Award	Recognition for exceptional community service	1997	Craig Biggio	
Hutch Award	Fighting spirit and competitiveness of Fred Hutchinson	1983	Ray Knight	
Hutch Award	Fighting spirit and competitiveness of Fred Hutchinson	2005	Craig Biggio	
Lou Gehrig Memorial Award	Exemplary contributions to community and in philanthropy	1988	Buddy Bell	
Lou Gehrig Memorial Award	Exemplary contributions to community and in philanthropy	1990	Glenn Davis	
Lou Gehrig Memorial Award	Exemplary contributions to community and in philanthropy	2016	Jose Altuve	
Luis Aparicio Award	Outstanding performance by Venezuelan baseball player	2014	Jose Altuve	
Luis Aparicio Award	Outstanding performance by Venezuelan baseball player	2016	Jose Altuve	
Luis Aparicio Award	Outstanding performance by Venezuelan baseball player	2017	Jose Altuve	
Luis Aparicio Award	Outstanding performance by Venezuelan baseball player	2022 (Note: Co-winner with Luis Arráez of the Minnesota Twins.)	Jose Altuve	
Roberto Clemente Award	Sportsmanship, community involvement and team contribution	2007	Craig Biggio	
Tip O'Neill Award	Outstanding performance by Canadian baseball player	1984	Terry Puhl	

=== MLB "This Year in Baseball Awards" ===
Note: These awards were renamed the "GIBBY Awards" (Greatness in Baseball Yearly) in 2010 and then the "Esurance MLB Awards in 2015.

==== "GIBBY Awards" Best Breakout Everyday Player ====
- 2014 – Jose Altuve

== MLB Players Choice Awards ==
Category		Year	Player
Player of the Year		2016	Jose Altuve
Player of the Year		2017	Jose Altuve
Outstanding Player	NL	1994	Jeff Bagwell
Outstanding Player	AL	2016	Jose Altuve
Outstanding Player	AL	2017	Jose Altuve
Outstanding Player	AL	2026	Yordan Alvarez
Outstanding Pitcher	NL	1999	Mike Hampton
Outstanding Pitcher	AL	2015	Dallas Keuchel
Outstanding Pitcher	AL	2019	Justin Verlander
Outstanding Pitcher	AL	2022	Justin Verlander
Outstanding Rookie	NL	2005	Willy Taveras
Outstanding Rookie	AL	2015	Carlos Correa
Outstanding Rookie	AL	2019	Yordan Alvarez
Comeback Player	AL	2022	Justin Verlander
Comeback Player	AL	2026	Yordan Alvarez
Majestic Athletic Always Game Award		2015	Jose Altuve
Majestic Athletic Always Game Award		2016	Jose Altuve
Players Choice Awards • Source:

== Media and partnership awards ==
=== Associated Press ===
Category	Year	Individual
AP Male Athlete of the Year	2017	Jose Altuve

=== Baseball America awards ===
Category	Year	Winner
Rookie of the Year	1991	Jeff Bagwell
Manager of the Year	1998	Larry Dierker
Manager of the Year	2017	A. J. Hinch
Organization of the Year	2001	Houston Astros
Major League Player of the Year	2017	Jose Altuve
Major League Player of the Year	2019	Justin Verlander
Baseball America MLB awards • Sources:

=== Baseball Digest awards ===
Category	Year	Player
Player of the Year	1994	Jeff Bagwell
Player of the Year	2017	Jose Altuve
Pitcher of the Year	2019	Justin Verlander
Baseball Digest • Sources:

=== ESPY Award ===
Houston Astros' ESPY Award winners
Category	Year	Winner
Best Major League Baseball Player	1995	Jeff Bagwell
Best Breakthrough Athlete	1995	Jeff Bagwell
Outstanding Team	2018	Houston Astros
ESPY Award • Ref:

=== Fielding Bible ===
Year	Player	Position	No.
2006	Adam Everett	Shortstop	1
2010	Michael Bourn	Center fielder	1
2014	Dallas Keuchel	Pitcher	1
2015	Dallas Keuchel	Pitcher	2
2016	Dallas Keuchel	Pitcher	3
2017	Dallas Keuchel	Pitcher	4
2019	Zack Greinke	Pitcher	1
2021	Carlos Correa	Shortstop	1
Fielding Bible Award • Source:

=== Hickok Belt ===
Year	Yr. / Mo.	Winner
2017	July	Jose Altuve
2017	October	Jose Altuve
2017	November	George Springer
2017	Annual	Jose Altuve
2019	September	Gerrit Cole
Hickok Belt • Source:

=== The Sporting News awards ===
Category		Year	Winner	Ref.
MLB Player of the Year		1994	Jeff Bagwell	
MLB Player of the Year		2016	Jose Altuve	
MLB Player of the Year		2017	Jose Altuve	
Pitcher of the Year (Note: From its inception in 1944 until 2013, the award was given to one pitcher each in both the AL and the NL.)	— (Note: Beginning in 2013, the Pitcher of the Year Award was redesignated as both a Starting Pitcher of the Year Award and a Relief Pitcher of the Year Award, bestowed to one of each in both the AL and the NL.)	1979	Joe Niekro	
Pitcher of the Year	—	1986	Mike Scott	
Pitcher of the Year	—	1999	Mike Hampton	
Pitcher of the Year	SP	2015	Dallas Keuchel	
Pitcher of the Year	SP	2019	Gerrit Cole	
Pitcher of the Year	SP	2022	Justin Verlander	
Reliever of the Year (Note: Awarded annually from 1960–2010 to one relief pitcher from each league, the AL and the NL, and discontinued in 2011. Known first as the Fireman of the Year from 1960–2000, it was renamed Reliever of the Year starting in 2001. In 2013, TSN resumed with recognizing relief pitchers with a singular award, by splitting the Pitcher of the Year Award—established in 1944—into one award for starting pitchers and one for relief pitchers.)	NL	1992	Doug Jones (Note: Co-winner with Lee Smith of the St. Louis Cardinals.)	
Rookie of the Year (Note: In 1961, and from 1963–2003, one Rookie Position Player of the Year and one Rookie Pitcher of the Year was selected from each league. Starting in 2004, this system was abandoned in favor of selecting one rookie from each league for the award.)	2B	1965	Joe Morgan	
Rookie of the Year	P	1969	Tom Griffin	
Rookie of the Year	OF	1974	Greg Gross	
Rookie of the Year	OF	1979	Jeffrey Leonard	
Rookie of the Year	1B	1991	Jeff Bagwell	
Rookie of the Year	P	1991	Al Osuna	
Rookie of the Year	P	2001	Roy Oswalt	
Rookie of the Year	OF	2005	Willy Taveras	
Rookie of the Year	SS	2015	Carlos Correa	
Rookie of the Year	DH	2019	Yordan Alvarez	
Comeback Player of the Year	NL	1981	Bob Knepper	
Comeback Player of the Year	AL	2022	Justin Verlander	
Comeback Player of the Year	AL	2026	Yordan Alvarez	
Manager of the Year (Note: From 1938 to 1985, one Manager of the Year Award was given for all of MLB. Starting in 1986, it was bestowed to one of each in both the AL and the NL.)	MLB	1980	Bill Virdon	
Manager of the Year	NL	1986	Hal Lanier	
MLB Executive of the Year		1980	Tal Smith	
MLB Executive of the Year		1998	Gerry Hunsicker	

=== Sports Illustrated ===
Houston Astros' Sports Illustrated award winners
Category	Year	Individual
SI Sportsperson of the Year	2017	Jose Altuve (Note: Co-winner with J. J. Watt of the Houston Texans (NFL).)
Ref:

=== Topps All-Star Rookie Teams ===
Year	Player	Position
1963	Rusty Staub	First baseman
1965	Joe Morgan	Second baseman
1966	Sonny Jackson	Shortstop
1968	Héctor Torres	Shortstop
1974	Larry Milbourne	Second baseman
1974	Greg Gross	Outfielder
1979	Jeffrey Leonard	Outfielder
1983	Bill Doran	Second baseman
1985	Glenn Davis	First baseman
1991	Jeff Bagwell	First baseman
1991	Andújar Cedeño	Shortstop
1991	Luis Gonzalez	Outfielder
1991	Al Osuna	Left-handed pitcher
1995	Orlando Miller	Shortstop
1996	Billy Wagner	Left-handed pitcher
2001	Roy Oswalt	Right-handed pitcher
2005	Willy Taveras	Outfielder
2007	Hunter Pence	Outfielder
2014	George Springer	Outfielder
2015	Carlos Correa	Shortstop
2016	Alex Bregman	Third baseman
2019	Yordan Alvarez	Designated hitter
2021	Luis García	Right-handed pitcher
2022	Jeremy Peña	Shortstop
2023	Yainer Díaz	Catcher
Topps All-Star Rookie teams • Source:

=== Wilson Sporting Goods ===
Wilson Sporting Goods defensive awards
Year	Winner	Position	Tier
2012	Justin Maxwell	Outfielder	Team
2013	Matt Dominguez	Third baseman	Team
2019	Zack Greinke	Pitcher	MLB
2019	Houston Astros	—	MLB
Note: (Note: Selection criteria for the Wilson MLB Defensive awards have evolved throughout its lifespan. Beginning in 2012, the year the awards were instituted, and through 2013, one award was presented to one player on each team, regardless of position, as well as one to the outstanding defender for each league, regardless of position or team. In 2014, the selection criteria were narrowed to one player at each position in the major leagues, regardless of team or league (AL or NL)—allowing teams to have multiple winners—while maintaining one award presented to the outstanding defender in each league. Further, in each year of the awards' existence, one award was presented to the outstanding defensive team in the major leagues. Since 2020, no Wilson MLB awards have been presented.); Wilson Defensive Player of the Year Award • Ref:

== Minor league system ==
=== California League Pitcher of the Year ===
- 2014 – Josh Hader

=== Houston Astros Minor League Player of the Year ===
- 1994 – Brian L. Hunter
- 1995 – Donne Wall
- 1996 – Bobby Abreu
- 1998 – Lance Berkman
- 2000 – Roy Oswalt
- 2003 – Chris Burke
- 2004 – Chris Burke
- 2011 – Jose Altuve, 2B
- 2012 – Jon Singleton, 1B
- 2013 – George Springer
- 2014 – Brett Phillips
- 2017 – Kyle Tucker, RF
- 2020 – Season cancelled: no awards
- 2022 – Yainer Díaz, C
- 2023 – Joey Loperfido
- 2024 – Shay Whitcomb, 2b

=== Houston Astros Minor League Pitcher of the Year ===
- 2012 – Mike Foltynewicz
- 2014 – Josh Hader, LHP
- 2017 – Forrest Whitley, RHP
- 2018 – Josh James, RHP
- 2019 – Cristian Javier, RHP
- 2020 – Season cancelled: no awards
- 2021 – Jonathan Bermúdez
- 2022 – Hunter Brown, RHP
- 2023 – Spencer Arrighetti, RHP
- 2024 – Ethan Pecko

== Other achievements ==
=== Retired numbers ===
See: Houston Astros § Retired numbers

=== Darryl Kile Good Guy Award ===
See Darryl Kile § Memorial and footnote (Note: The Kile Award is bestowed to the player who best exemplifies Kile's virtues of being "a good teammate, a great friend, a fine father and a humble man." Two awards were presented annually from 2003 to 2019, one to a Houston Astro and one to a St. Louis Cardinal (until 2019), and selected, respectively, by the Houston and St. Louis chapters of the Baseball Writers' Association of America (BBWAA).)

- 2003 – Jeff Bagwell
- 2004 – Roy Oswalt
- 2005 – Morgan Ensberg
- 2006 – Brad Lidge
- 2007 – Woody Williams
- 2008 – Hunter Pence
- 2009 – Brian Moehler
- 2010 – Geoff Blum
- 2011 – Jason Bourgeois
- 2012 – Jason Castro
- 2013 – Carlos Corporán
- 2014 – Scott Feldman
- 2015 – Hank Conger
- 2016 – Collin McHugh
- 2017 – Carlos Correa
- 2018 – Charlie Morton
- 2019 – Will Harris
- 2020 – Brad Peacock
- 2021 – Alex Bregman
- 2022 – Martín Maldonado
- 2023 – Jose Altuve
- 2024 – Mauricio Dubón
- 2025 - Josh Hader
- 2026 - Bryan Abreu

=== Texas Sports Hall of Fame ===
See: Houston Astros § Texas Sports Hall of Fame

=== Inductees into Halls of Fame outside of the United States ===
- Canada:
  - Terry Puhl—1995—HOU: 1977—1990
  - Claude Raymond—1984—HOU: 1964—1967
- Caribbean:
  - Joaquín Andújar—2012—HOU: 1976—1981, 1988
  - George Brunet—1999—HOU: 1962—1963
  - Tony Peña—2016—HOU: 1997
  - Dickie Thon—2008—HOU: 1981—1987
- Mexico:
  - George Brunet—1999—HOU: 1962—1963
  - Vinny Castilla—2020—HOU: 2001
  - Aurelio López—1993—HOU: 1986 to 1987
- Venezuela:
  - Bobby Abreu—2021–HOU: 1996 to 1997
  - Aurelio Monteagudo—2009—HOU: 1966

== Annual batting leaders ==
Key
Numbers in bold	Led all Major League Baseball (MLB) players
National League	1962—2012
American League	2013—present

=== Triple Crown categories ===
==== Batting champions ====
Yr.	Player	Average	No.
2014	**Jose Altuve**	.341	1
2016	**Jose Altuve**	.338	2
2017	**Jose Altuve**	.346	3
2021	**Yuli Gurriel**	.319	1
2026	**Yordan Alvarez**	.316	1
MLB batting champions • Source:

==== Home run leaders ====
Yr.	Player	Total	No.
None
MLB home run leaders • Source:

==== Runs batted in (RBI) leaders ====
Yr.	Player	Total	No.
1994	**Jeff Bagwell**	116	1
2002	**Lance Berkman**	128	1
2023	**Kyle Tucker**	112	1
MLB RBI leaders • Source:

=== Rate statistics ===
==== On-base percentage (OBP) leaders ====
Yr.	Player	Total	No.
2026	Yordan Alvarez	.432	1

==== Slugging percentage (SLG) leaders ====
Yr.	Player	Total	No.
1994	Jeff Bagwell	.750	1
2026	Yordan Alvarez	.601	1
NL annual slugging percentage leaders • Source:

==== On-base plus slugging percentage (OPS) leaders ====
Yr.	Player	Total	No.
1994	Jeff Bagwell	1.201	1
2026	Yordan Alvarez	1.033	1

==== At bats per home run leaders ====
Yr.	Player	Total	No.
1994	Jeff Bagwell	10.3	1
2014	Chris Carter	13.7	1
Ref:

==== At bats per strikeout leaders ====
Yr.	Player	Total	No.
1964	Nellie Fox	34.0	1
2009	Miguel Tejada	13.2	1
2010	Jeff Keppinger	14.3	1
Ref:

=== Cumulative statistics ===
==== Games played leaders ====
Yr.	Player	Total	No.
1978	Enos Cabell	162	1
1987	Bill Doran	162	1
1992	Jeff Bagwell	162	1
1992	Craig Biggio	162	1
1992	Steve Finley	162	1
1996	Jeff Bagwell	162	2
1996	Craig Biggio	162	2
1997	Jeff Bagwell	162	3
1999	Jeff Bagwell	162	4
2007	Carlos Lee	162	1
2016	George Springer	162	1

==== At bats leaders ====
Yr.	Player	Total	No.
1978	Enos Cabell	660	1
2015	Jose Altuve	638	1

==== Plate appearances ====
Yr.	Player	Total	No.
1995	Craig Biggio	673	1
1997	Craig Biggio	744	2
1998	Craig Biggio	738	3
1999	Craig Biggio	749	4
2016	George Springer	744	1

==== Runs scored leaders ====
Yr.	Player	Total	No.
1994	Jeff Bagwell	104	1
1995	Craig Biggio	123	1
1997	Craig Biggio	146	2
1999	Jeff Bagwell	143	2
2000	Jeff Bagwell	152	3
MLB annual runs scored leaders • Source:

==== Hits leaders ====
Yr.	Player	Total	No.
1983	José Cruz	189 (Note: Tied with Andre Dawson of the Chicago Cubs.)	1
2014	Jose Altuve	225	1
2015	Jose Altuve	200	2
2016	Jose Altuve	216	3
2017	Jose Altuve	204	4
MLB hits records • Titles leaders • 'Source:

==== Total bases leaders ====
Yr.	Player	Total	No.
1994	Jeff Bagwell	300	1
2026	Yordan Alvarez	341	1

==== Singles leaders ====
Yr.	Player	Total	No.
1966	Sonny Jackson	160	1
2005	Willy Taveras	152	1
2014	Jose Altuve	168	1
2017	Jose Altuve	137	2
2024	Jose Altuve	134	3

==== Doubles leaders ====
Yr.	Player	Total	No.
1967	Rusty Staub	44	1
1971	César Cedeño	40	1
1972	César Cedeño	39 (Note: Tied with Willie Montañez of the Philadelphia Phillies.)	2
1994	Craig Biggio	44 (Note: Tied with Larry Walker of the Montreal Expos.)	1
1996	Jeff Bagwell	48	1
1998	Craig Biggio	51	2
1999	Craig Biggio	56	3
2001	Lance Berkman	55	1
2008	Lance Berkman	46 (Note: Tied with Nate McLouth of the Pittsburgh Pirates.)	2
2009	Miguel Tejada	46	1
2018	Alex Bregman	51	1
MLB annual doubles leaders • Doubles records • Source:

==== Triples leaders ====
Yr.	Player	Total	No.
1971	Roger Metzger	**11** (Note: Tied with Freddie Patek of the Kansas City Royals.)	1
1971	Joe Morgan	**11**	1
1973	Roger Metzger	14	2
1981	Craig Reynolds	12 (Note: Tied with Gene Richards of the San Diego Padres.)	1
1982	Dickie Thon	10	1
1993	Steve Finley	13	1
2020	Kyle Tucker	6	1
MLB annual triples leaders • Source:

==== Extra-base hits leaders ====
Yr.	Player	Total	No.
1994	Jeff Bagwell	73 (Note: Tied with Albert Belle of the Cleveland Indians and Frank Thomas of the Chicago White Sox.)	1
2026	Yordan Alvarez	77	1

==== Times on base leaders ====
Yr.	Player	Total	No.
1994	Jeff Bagwell	216	1
1996	Jeff Bagwell	324	2
1997	Craig Biggio	309 (Note: Tied with Edgar Martínez of the Seattle Mariners.)	1
1999	Jeff Bagwell	331	3
2019	Alex Bregman	292	1
2023	Alex Bregman	263	2
2026	Yordan Alvarez	299	1

==== Stolen base leaders ====
Yr.	Player	Total	No.
1994	Craig Biggio	39	1
2009	Michael Bourn	61	1
2010	Michael Bourn	52	2
2011	Michael Bourn	61 (Note: Bourn was acquired by the Atlanta Braves prior to the trade deadline in 2011.)	3
2014	Jose Altuve	56	1
2015	Jose Altuve	38	2
MLB annual stolen base leaders • Source:

==== Bases on balls (walks) leaders ====
Yr.	Player	Total	No.
1965	Joe Morgan	97	1
1969	Jimmy Wynn	148	1
1980	Joe Morgan	93 (Note: Tied with Dan Driessen of the Cincinnati Reds.)	2
1999	Jeff Bagwell	149	1
2019	Alex Bregman	119	1
2026	Yordan Alvarez	109	1

==== Most strikeouts ====
Yr.	Player	Total	No.
1967	Jimmy Wynn	137	1
1972	Lee May	145 (Note: Tied with Bobby Darwin of the Minnesota Twins.)	1
2013	Chris Carter	212	1

==== Hit by pitch leaders ====
Yr.	Player	Total	No.
1990	Glenn Davis	8	1
1991	Jeff Bagwell	13	1
1995	Craig Biggio	22	1
1996	Craig Biggio	27	2
1997	Craig Biggio	34	3
2001	Craig Biggio	28	4
2003	Craig Biggio	27	5

==== Sacrifice hits leaders ====
Yr.	Player	Total	No.
1964	Nellie Fox	20	1
1966	Sonny Jackson	27	1
1979	Craig Reynolds	34	1
1981	Craig Reynolds	18	2
1984	Craig Reynolds	16	3
1985	Nolan Ryan	14 (Note: Tied with Wally Backman of the New York Mets.)	1
1999	Shane Reynolds	17 (Note: Tied with Omar Vizquel of the Cleveland Indians.)	1
2006	Roy Oswalt	20	1
2023	Martín Maldonado	12	1

==== Sacrifice flies leaders ====
Yr.	Player	Total	No.
1977	José Cruz	10 (Note: Tied with Bobby Murcer of the Chicago Cubs.)	1
1979	César Cedeño	9 (Note: Tied with Dave Parker of the Pittsburgh Pirates and Mike Schmidt of the Philadelphia Phillies.)	1
1984	José Cruz	10 (Note: Tied with Steve Garvey and Carmelo Martínez of the San Diego Padres, and Gary Matthews of the Chicago Cubs.)	2
1992	Jeff Bagwell	13 (Note: Tied with Joe Carter of the Toronto Blue Jays.)	1
1993	Luis Gonzalez	10	1
1998	Derek Bell	10 (Note: Tied with Rico Brogna of the Philadelphia Phillies and Jeff Kent of the San Francisco Giants.)	1
2007	Carlos Lee	13	1
2017	Josh Reddick	12 (Note: Tied with Evan Longoria of the Tampa Bay Rays.)	1
2018	Carlos Correa	11	1
2022	Alex Bregman	10 (Note: Tied with Marcus Semien of the Texas Rangers and Alec Bohm of the Philadelphia Phillies.)	1

==== Intentional bases on balls ====
Yr.	Player	Total	No.
2026	Yordan Alvarez	33	1

==== Most double plays grounded into ====
Yr.	Player	Total	No.
2000	Moisés Alou	21	1
2002	Brad Ausmus	30	1
2007	Carlos Lee	27 (Note: Tied with Albert Pujols of the St. Louis Cardinals.)	1
2008	Miguel Tejada	32	1
2009	Miguel Tejada	29	2
2018	Yuli Gurriel	22	1
2024	Yainer Díaz	22 (Note: Tied with Aaron Judge of the New York Yankees.)	1

==== Most outs made ====
Yr.	Player	Total	No.
1972	Roger Metzger	528	1

==== Most times caught stealing ====
Yr.	Player	Total	No.
1972	César Cedeño	21	1
1975	César Cedeño	17	2
1986	Bill Doran	19	1
1988	Gerald Young	29 (Note: Tied with Vince Coleman of the St. Louis Cardinals.)	1
1989	Gerald Young	25	2
1990	Eric Yelding	25	1
2013	Jose Altuve	13	1
2015	Jose Altuve	13	2
2016	Jose Altuve	10	3
2016	George Springer	10	1

=== Other leaders ===
==== Adjusted OPS+ leaders ====
Yr.	Player	Total	No.
1994	Jeff Bagwell	213	1
2026	Yordan Alvarez	190	1

==== Runs created ====
Yr.	Player	Total	No.
1994	Jeff Bagwell	137	1
2019	Alex Bregman	150 (Note: Tied with Christian Yelich of the Milwaukee Brewers.)	1
2026	Yordan Alvarez	155	1

==== Power—speed number ====
Yr.	Player	Total	No.
1965	Jimmy Wynn	29.1	1
1974	César Cedeño	35.7	1
1999	Jeff Bagwell	35.0	1
2017	Jose Altuve	27.4	1
2022	Kyle Tucker	27.3	1

== Annual pitching leaders ==
Key
**Bold**	Led all Major League Baseball (MLB) players	National League	1962—2012
	Won two of three Triple Crown categories	American League	2013—present

=== Triple Crown categories ===
==== Earned run average (ERA) champions ====
Year	Pitcher	Average	No.
1979	J. R. Richard	**2.71**	1
1981	Nolan Ryan	1.69	1
1986	Mike Scott	**2.22**	1
1987	Nolan Ryan	2.76	2
1990	Danny Darwin	2.21	1
2005	Roger Clemens	1.87	1
2006	Roy Oswalt	2.98	1
2019	Gerrit Cole	2.50	1
2022	Justin Verlander	**1.75**	1
See also: MLB ERA leaders • Source:

==== Wins leaders ====
Year	Pitcher	Total	No.
1979	Joe Niekro	21 (Note: Tied with Phil Niekro of the Atlanta Braves.)	1
1989	Mike Scott	20	1
1999	Mike Hampton	22	1
2004	Roy Oswalt	20	1
2015	Dallas Keuchel	20	1
2019	Justin Verlander	21	1
2022	Justin Verlander	18	2
See also: MLB wins leaders • Source:

==== Strikeout leaders ====
Year	Pitcher	Total	No.
1978	J. R. Richard	303	1
1979	J. R. Richard	**313**	2
1986	Mike Scott	**306**	1
1987	Nolan Ryan	**270**	1
1988	Nolan Ryan	228	2
1998	Randy Johnson	329 (Note: Includes totals while playing in both the American and National Leagues as a result of changing teams and leagues; however, Johnson did not lead either league individually.)	1
2018	Justin Verlander	290	1
2019	Gerrit Cole	**326**	1
See also: MLB strikeout leaders • Source:

=== Rate statistics ===
==== Win–loss percentage ====
Year	Pitcher	Figure	No.
1993	Mark Portugal	.818	1
1999	Mike Hampton	.846	1
2001	Roy Oswalt	.824	1
2004	Roger Clemens	.818	1
2018	Charlie Morton	.833	1
2022	Justin Verlander	.818	1

==== Walks plus hits per inning pitched (WHIP) ====
Year	Pitcher	Figure	No.
1979	Ken Forsch	1.069	1
1981	Don Sutton	1.015	1
1986	Mike Scott	**0.923**	1
1990	Danny Darwin	1.027	1
2010	Roy Oswalt	1.025 (Note: Oswalt was acquired by the Philadelphia Phillies prior to the trade deadline in 2010.)	1
2015	Dallas Keuchel	1.017	1
2018	Justin Verlander	0.902	1
2019	Justin Verlander	0.803	2
2022	Justin Verlander	**0.829**	3

==== Hits per 9 innings (H/9) ====
Year	Pitcher	Figure	No.
1971	Don Wilson	6.549	1
1976	J. R. Richard	6.835	1
1978	J. R. Richard	6.276	2
1979	J. R. Richard	**6.773**	3
1981	Nolan Ryan	5.980	1
1982	Nolan Ryan	7.047	2
1983	Nolan Ryan	6.143	3
1986	Mike Scott	**5.949**	1
1987	Nolan Ryan	**6.548**	4
1991	Pete Harnisch	7.020	1
1993	Pete Harnisch	7.070	2
2005	Roger Clemens	6.431	1
2019	Justin Verlander	5.529	1
2021	Lance McCullers Jr.	6.674	1
2022	Justin Verlander	5.996	2
2024	Ronel Blanco	6.131	1

==== Walks per 9 IP (BB/9) leaders ====
Year	Pitcher	Figure	No.
1979	Ken Forsch	1.773	1
1990	Danny Darwin	1.715	1
1999	Shane Reynolds	1.437	1

==== Home runs per 9 IP (HR/9) leaders ====
Year	Pitcher	Figure	No.
1974	Dave Roberts	0.265	1
1979	Joaquín Andújar	0.325	1
1981	Nolan Ryan	0.121	1
1999	Mike Hampton	0.452	1
2021	Lance McCullers Jr.	0.721	1
2022	Framber Valdez	0.492	1

==== Strikeouts per 9 IP (SO/9 or K/9) ====
Year	Pitcher	Figure	No.
1969	Tom Griffin	9.558	1
1978	J. R. Richard	9.904	1
1979	J. R. Richard	**9.636**	2
1986	Mike Scott	**10.002**	1
1987	Nolan Ryan	**11.480**	1
1988	Nolan Ryan	9.327	2
2018	Gerrit Cole	13.818	1
2019	Gerrit Cole	**12.399**	2

==== Strikeout-to-walk ratio (K/BB) ====
Year	Pitcher	Figure	No.
1962	Ken Johnson	3.870	1
1979	J. R. Richard	3.194	1
1981	Don Sutton	3.586	1
1986	Mike Scott	**4.250**	1
1987	Nolan Ryan	**3.103**	1
1998	José Lima	5.281	1
1999	Shane Reynolds	5.324	1
2006	Roy Oswalt	4.368 (Note: Tied with Matt Bush of the Milwaukee Brewers.)	1
2018	Justin Verlander	7.143	1
2019	Justin Verlander	7.818	2

=== Cumulative statistics ===
==== Games played leaders ====
Year	Pitcher	Total	No.
1990	Juan Agosto	82	1
1992	Joe Boever	81 (Note: Tied with Kenny Rogers of the Texas Rangers.)	1
2018	Ryan Pressly	77 (Note: Pressly was acquired from the Minnesota Twins prior to the trade deadline in 2018.)	1
Ref:

==== Games started leaders ====
Year	Pitcher	Total	No.
1973	Jerry Reuss	40 (Note: Tied with Jack Billingham of the Cincinnati Reds and Steve Carlton of the Philadelphia Phillies.)	1
1983	Joe Niekro	38 (Note: Tied with Dan Petry of the Detroit Tigers.)	1
1984	Joe Niekro	38	2
1987	Mike Scott	36 (Note: Tied with Shane Rawley of the Philadelphia Phillies and Zane Smith of the Atlanta Braves.)	1
1995	Doug Drabek	31 (Note: Tied with 4 others.)	1
1998	Shane Reynolds	34 (Note: Tied with Kevin Brown of the Los Angeles Dodgers, Darryl Kile of the Colorado Rockies, and Curt Schilling of the Philadelphia Phillies.)	1
1999	Shane Reynolds	**35** (Note: Tied with 5 others.)	2
1999	José Lima	**35**	1
2004	Roy Oswalt	35	1
2005	Roy Oswalt	35 (Note: Tied with 8 others.)	2
2006	Andy Pettitte	35	1
2018	Dallas Keuchel	34	1
2018	Justin Verlander	34	1
2019	Justin Verlander	34	2
Ref:

==== Games finished leaders ====
Year	Pitcher	Total	No.
1992	Doug Jones	70	1
2003	Billy Wagner	67 (Note: Tied with Éric Gagné of the Los Angeles Dodgers and Keith Foulke of the Chicago White Sox.)	1
2008	José Valverde	71	1
2019	Roberto Osuna	56	1
Ref:

==== Saves leaders ====
Year	Pitcher	Total	No.
1964	Hal Woodeshick	23	1
1969	Fred Gladding	29	1
2008	José Valverde	44	1
2019	Roberto Osuna	38	1
MLB annual saves leaders • Ref:

==== Complete games leaders ====
Year	Pitcher	Total	No.
2014	Dallas Keuchel	5	1
2022	Framber Valdez	3	1
2025	Framber Valdez	2	2

==== Shutouts ====
Year	Pitcher	Total	No.
1979	Joe Niekro	5	1
1986	Bob Knepper	5	1
1986	Mike Scott	5	1
1993	Pete Harnisch	4 (Note: Tied with Jack McDowell of the Chicago White Sox.)	1
1998	Randy Johnson	6	1
2015	Dallas Keuchel	2	1
2018	Gerrit Cole	**1** (Note: Tied with 17 others.)	1
2018	Justin Verlander	**1**	1
2022	Framber Valdez	1 (Note: Tied with 15 others.)	1
2023	Framber Valdez	2 (Note: Tied with Gerrit Cole of the New York Yankees.)	2
2024	Ronel Blanco	1	1
MLB shutout leaders • Source:

==== Innings pitched ====
Year	Pitcher	Total	No.
1986	Mike Scott	**275 1/3**	1
2015	Dallas Keuchel	232	1
2019	Justin Verlander	223	1
2022	Framber Valdez	201 1/3	1
Ref:

==== Hits allowed ====
Year	Pitcher	Total	No.
2018	Dallas Keuchel	211	1
Ref:

==== Home runs allowed ====
Year	Pitcher	Total	No.
2000	José Lima	48	1
2007	Woody Williams	35	1
2008	Brandon Backe	36	1
Ref:

==== Bases on balls allowed ====
Year	Pitcher	Total	No.
1973	Jerry Reuss	117	1
1975	J. R. Richard	138	1
1978	J. R. Richard	151	2
1979	J. R. Richard	141	3
1981	Nolan Ryan	98	1
1982	Nolan Ryan	104	2
1994	Darryl Kile	82	1
2013	Lucas Harrell	88	1
2021	Lance McCullers Jr.	76	1

==== Earned runs allowed ====
Year	Pitcher	Total	No.
2000	José Lima	145	1
2008	Brandon Backe	112	1
Ref:

==== Most losses ====
Year	Pitcher	Total	No.
1987	Bob Knepper	17	1
1993	Doug Drabek	18	1
2013	Lucas Harrell	17	1
Ref:

==== Wild pitches ====
Year	Pitcher	Total	No.
1968	Larry Dierker	20	1
1969	Don Wilson	16 (Note: Tied with Jim Maloney of the Cincinnati Reds, and Andy Messersmith and Tom Murphy of the California Angels.)	1
1975	J. R. Richard	20	1
1978	J. R. Richard	16	2
1979	J. R. Richard	**19**	3
1979	Joe Niekro	**19**	1
1981	Nolan Ryan	16	1
1982	Joe Niekro	19	2
1983	Joe Niekro	14	3
1985	Joe Niekro	21	4
1986	Nolan Ryan	15	2
1994	Darryl Kile	10 (Note: Tied with Richie Lewis of the Florida Marlins and Scott Sanders of the San Diego Padres.)	1
2016	Mike Fiers	17	1
2025	Framber Valdez	12	1

==== Most hit batsmen ====
Year	Pitcher	Total	No.
1971	Jack Billingham	16	1
1972	Jerry Reuss	10	1
1982	Nolan Ryan	8	1
1993	Darryl Kile	15	1
1996	Darryl Kile	16 (Note: Tied with Kevin Brown of the Florida Marlins and Al Leiter of the San Francisco Giants and Montreal Expos.)	2
2017	Mike Fiers	13 (Note: Tied with José Berríos of the Minnesota Twins.)	1
2017	Charlie Morton	13	1
2018	Charlie Morton	16 (Note: Tied with Rick Porcello of the Boston Red Sox.)	2
Ref:

==== Batters faced leaders ====
Year	Pitcher	Total	No.
1997	Darryl Kile	1,056	1
2015	Dallas Keuchel	911	1
2018	Dallas Keuchel	874	2
2022	Framber Valdez	827	1
Ref:

== Annual fielding leaders ==
=== All players ===
==== Putouts leaders ====
Yr.	Player	Total	No.
1972	Lee May	1,318	1
2025	Christian Walker	1,100	1
MLB putouts leaders • Source:

==== Assists leaders ====
Year	Player	Total	No.
1995	Craig Biggio	419	1
1997	Craig Biggio	504	2
2009	Miguel Tejada	475	1
MLB annual assists leaders • Ref:

==== Total zone runs leaders ====
Year	Player	Total	No.
1993	Luis Gonzalez	22	1
2006	Adam Everett	40	1
2010	Michael Bourn	21	1
2021	Carlos Correa	13	1
Ref:

==== Most errors committed ====
Year	Player	Total	No.
1966	Sonny Jackson	37	1
1967	Sonny Jackson	35 (Note: Tied with Dick Allen of the Philadelphia Phillies.)	2
1980	Enos Cabell	29 (Note: Tied with Garry Templeton of the St. Louis Cardinals.)	1
1994	Andújar Cedeño	23	1
MLB annual fielding errors leaders • Ref:

=== Catchers ===
==== Defensive games leaders ====
Year	Player	Total	No.
1969	Johnny Edwards	151 (Note: Tied with Randy Hundley of the Chicago Cubs.)	1
1970	Johnny Edwards	139 (Note: Tied with Johnny Bench of the Cincinnati Reds and Dick Dietz of the San Francisco Giants.)	2
2005	Brad Ausmus	138	1
2006	Brad Ausmus	134	2
2020	Martín Maldonado	47	1
Ref:

==== Putouts leaders ====
Year	Player	Total	No.
1969	Johnny Edwards	1,135	1
1991	Craig Biggio	889	1
2005	Brad Ausmus	884	1
2006	Brad Ausmus	929	2
2018	Martín Maldonado	1,021 (Note: Maldonado was acquired from the Los Angeles Angels prior to the trade deadline in 2018.)	1
2020	Martín Maldonado	375	2
2022	Martín Maldonado	1,025	3
Ref:

==== Assists leaders ====
Year	Player	Total	No.
1969	Johnny Edwards	79 (Note: Tied with Randy Hundley of the Chicago Cubs and Mike Ryan of the Philadelphia Philles.)	1
1970	Johnny Edwards	74	2
1975	Milt May	70	1
2022	Martín Maldonado	49	1
2023	Martín Maldonado	51	2
Ref:

==== Most errors committed ====
Year	Player	Total	No.
1963	John Bateman	23	1
1966	John Bateman	15	2
1985	Mark Bailey	13 (Note: Tied with Mike Scioscia of the Los Angeles Dodgers.)	1
Ref:

==== Double plays turned leaders ====
Year	Player	Total	No.
1966	John Bateman	14	1
Ref:

==== Most passed balls ====
Year	Player	Total	No.
1963	John Bateman	16 (Note: Tied with Tim McCarver of the St. Louis Cardinals.)	1
1966	John Bateman	21	2
1976	Cliff Johnson	12 (Note: Tied with Thurman Munson of the New York Yankees and Darrell Porter of the Milwaukee Brewers.)	1
1977	Joe Ferguson	16	1
1980	Alan Ashby	14	1
1982	Luis Pujols	20	1
1984	Mark Bailey	17	1
1985	Mark Bailey	19	2
1991	Craig Biggio	13	1
2014	Jason Castro	11	1
2022	Martín Maldonado	9	1
2023	Martín Maldonado	12	2
Ref:

==== Most stolen bases allowed ====
Year	Player	Total	No.
1962	Hal Smith	59	1
1964	Jerry Grote	51	1
1989	Craig Biggio	140	1
1990	Craig Biggio	117	2
1991	Craig Biggio	126	3
2014	Jason Castro	81	1
Ref:

==== Caught stealing leaders ====
Year	Player	Total	No.
1970	Johnny Edwards	49	1
1975	Milt May	47	1
1977	Joe Ferguson	61	1
2021	Martín Maldonado	19	1
Ref:

==== Caught stealing percentage leaders ====
Year	Player	Figure	No.
1997	Brad Ausmus	49.5	1
Ref:

=== Third basemen ===
==== Putouts ====
Year	Player	Total	No.
1970	Doug Rader	147	1
1973	Doug Rader	134	2
1977	Enos Cabell	146	1
2024	Alex Bregman	103 (Note: Tied with Nolan Arenado of the St.Louis Cardinals.)	1
Ref:

==== Assists ====
Year	Player	Total	No.
1970	Doug Rader	147	1
1972	Doug Rader	134	2
2022	Alex Bregman	263 (Note: Tied with Matt Chapman of the Toronto Blue Jays.)	1
2023	Alex Bregman	281	2
2024	Alex Bregman	242	3
Ref:

== Player value leaders ==
=== Wins Above Replacement (WAR) ===
==== Overall WAR leaders ====
Year	Player	Total	No.
1986	Mike Scott	8.2	1
2019	Alex Bregman	8.9	1
Ref:

==== Position player WAR leaders ====
Year	Player	Total	No.
1983	Dickie Thon	7.4	1
1994	Jeff Bagwell	8.2	1
1999	Jeff Bagwell	7.4	2
2019	Alex Bregman	8.9	1
2021	Carlos Correa	7.2	1
Ref:

==== Pitcher WAR leaders ====
Year	Pitcher	Total	No.
1986	Mike Scott	8.4	1
2005	Roger Clemens	7.8	1
2007	Roy Oswalt	6.6	1
2015	Dallas Keuchel	6.5	1
Ref:

==== Offensive WAR leaders ====
Year	Player	Total	No.
1994	Jeff Bagwell	7.7	1
1995	Craig Biggio	6.5	1
2017	Jose Altuve	7.8	1
2026	Yordan Alvarez	7.3	1

==== Defensive WAR leaders ====
Year	Player	Total	No.
2006	Adam Everett	4.1	1
2010	Michael Bourn	3.5	1
2011	Clint Barmes	2.5	1
2021	Carlos Correa	2.9	1
Ref:

== See also ==
- Baseball awards
- Baseball statistics
- List of MLB awards
- Sabermetrics
