= Cam Smith (baseball) =

American baseball player (born 2003)

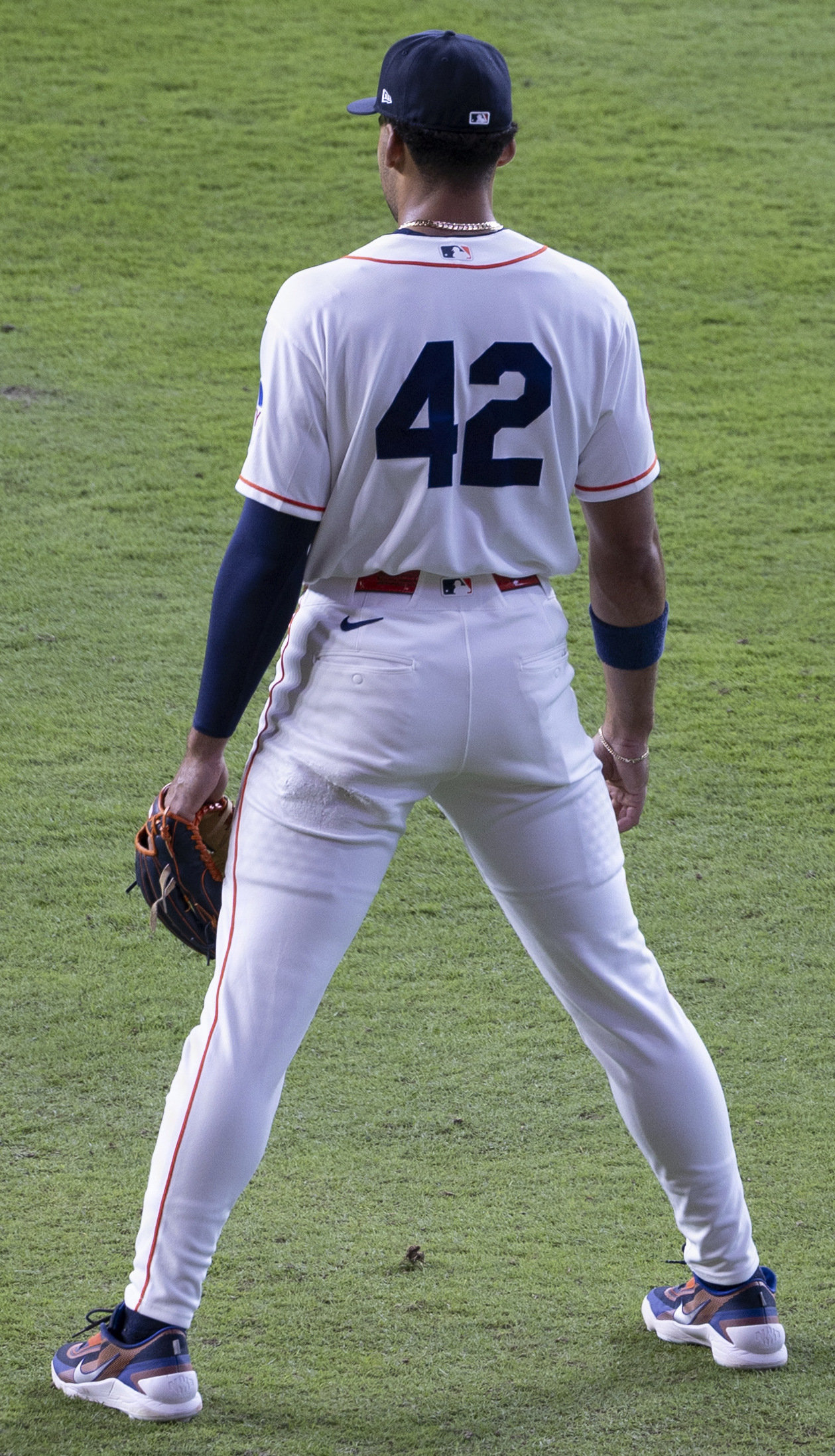
- Smith in 2026

Houston Astros – No. 11
- Right fielder
- Born: February 22, 2003 (age 23); Lake Worth, Florida, U.S.
- Bats: Right Throws: Right

MLB debut
- March 27, 2025, for the Houston Astros

MLB statistics (through 2026 season)
- Batting average: .222
- Home runs: 30
- Runs batted in: 107
- Stats at Baseball Reference

Teams
- Houston Astros (2025–present)

Cameron Vaughn Smith (born February 22, 2003) is an American professional baseball right fielder and third baseman for the Houston Astros of Major League Baseball (MLB). He made his MLB debut in 2025.

== Amateur career ==
Smith attended Palm Beach Central High School in Wellington, Florida. As a senior in 2022, he was the Sun Sentinel 7A-6A Player of the Year after hitting .435 with six home runs and 32 runs batted in (RBI). He was also a finalist for the Palm Beach Post's Baseball Player of the Year. Smith committed to Florida State University to play college baseball.

As a freshman at Florida State in 2023, Smith started 51 games and hit .258/.326/.517 with 12 home runs and 36 RBI over 209 at bats. After the season, he played collegiate summer baseball with the Hyannis Harbor Hawks of the Cape Cod Baseball League, where he was named a league all-star and received the league's Outstanding Pro Prospect award. Smith entered his sophomore season in 2024 as a top prospect for the 2024 Major League Baseball draft. He returned that season as Florida State's starting third baseman.

== Professional career ==
=== Chicago Cubs ===
The Chicago Cubs selected Smith in the first round, with the 14th overall selection, of the 2024 Major League Baseball draft. On July 20, 2024, Smith signed with the Cubs for a $5.07 million bonus. He split the campaign between the Single–A Myrtle Beach Pelicans, High–A South Bend Cubs, and Double–A Tennessee Smokies. In 32 games split between the three affiliates, Smith slashed .313/.396/.609 with seven home runs, 24 RBI, and two stolen bases.

=== Houston Astros ===
On December 13, 2024, the Cubs traded Smith, Isaac Paredes, and Hayden Wesneski to the Houston Astros in exchange for Kyle Tucker.

On March 27, 2025, the Astros selected Smith's contract after he made the team's Opening Day roster. Having previously displayed uniform number 24—already retired in tribute of Jimmy Wynn—Smith chose number 11 in honor of former Florida State head coach Mike Martin. He made his major league debut as the starting right fielder on Opening Day at Daikin Park versus the New York Mets. In his first at bat, he got his first major league hit, a single to opposite field off the first pitch from starter Clay Holmes. On April 11, Smith produced his first major league home run and stolen base, at home versus the Los Angeles Angels. On June 14, Smith's ground ball single up the middle with two outs in the bottom of the ninth delivered his first career walk-off hit for a 3–2 win over the Minnesota Twins. Following the season, Smith was named a Gold Glove finalist and placed 10th in American League (AL) Rookie of the Year balloting.

On June 23, 2026, Smith was the second of three Astros hitters who connected for consecutive home runs for the eighth time in club history. The first was hit by Yainer Díaz, and Taylor Trammell followed Smith, all against Shane Bieber during the fourth inning at the Rogers Centre. (Note: The most recent instance of the Astros hitting three successive home runs was on July 19, 2019, by Jose Altuve, Alex Bregman, and Yordan Alvarez, versus the Texas Rangers.) Smith was named the Astros' nominee for the Heart & Hustle Award. During the 2026 season, Smith ranked tenth in the American League (AL) in games played (157), all of which were in the outfield defensively, which led the AL. Among AL right fielders, Smith ranked first in putouts (294) and double plays (2), third in errors (6), and fifth in assists (8). Offensively, he was second in the league in triples (6), hit 21 home runs and 56 RBI, .210/.279/.390/.669 (Note: Listed combination of batting statistics including batting average (AVG), on-base percentage (OBP), slugging percentage (SLG), and on-base plus slugging percentage (OPS).) and 12 stolen bases. In the two-game Wild Card Series, he homered and batted .286/.375/.714/1.089. However, the Chicago White Sox swept the Astros to eliminate them from the playoffs.
