= List of Gold Glove Award winners as a utility player =

The Gold Glove Award is the award given annually to the Major League Baseball players judged to have exhibited superior individual fielding performances at each fielding position in both the National League (NL) and the American League (AL), as voted by the managers and coaches in each league. Managers are not permitted to vote for their own players. Eighteen Gold Gloves are awarded each year (with the exception of 1957, 1985, 2007 and 2018), one at each of the nine positions in each league. In 1957, the baseball glove manufacturer Rawlings created the Gold Glove Award to commemorate the best fielding performance at each position. The award was created from a glove made from gold lamé-tanned leather and affixed to a walnut base. Initially, only one Gold Glove per position was awarded to the top fielder at each position in the entire league; however, separate awards were given for the National and American Leagues beginning in 1958.

Beginning in 2022, Major League Baseball awarded a Gold Glove Award to a utility player (i.e. players who played multiple fielding positions in a given season).

== Key ==
Year	Links to the corresponding Major League Baseball season
PO	Putout
A	Assist
E	Error
DP	Double play
FPct	Fielding percentage
* or **	Winner of the most Gold Glove Awards at his position (** indicates tie)
†	Member of the National Baseball Hall of Fame and Museum

== American League winners ==
Year	Player	Team	PO	A	E	DP	FPct	Ref
2022	DJ LeMahieu	New York Yankees	306	210	4	44	.992	
2023	Mauricio Dubón*	Houston Astros	199	202	7	56	.983	
2024	Dylan Moore	Seattle Mariners	194	202	5	28	.988	
2025	Mauricio Dubón*	Houston Astros	169	181	6	34	.983	
2026	Ezequiel Durán	Texas Rangers	221	260	6	38	.988	

== National League winners ==
Year	Player	Team	PO	A	E	DP	FPct	Ref
2022	Brendan Donovan	St. Louis Cardinals	208	180	7	49	.982	
2023	Ha-seong Kim	San Diego Padres	198	366	7	73	.988	
2024	Jared Triolo	Pittsburgh Pirates	149	228	3	46	.992	
2025	Javier Sanoja	Miami Marlins	127	139	3	24	.989	
2026	Mauricio Dubón*	Atlanta Braves	260	154	6	34	.986	
