= Framber Valdez =

Dominican baseball player (born 1993)

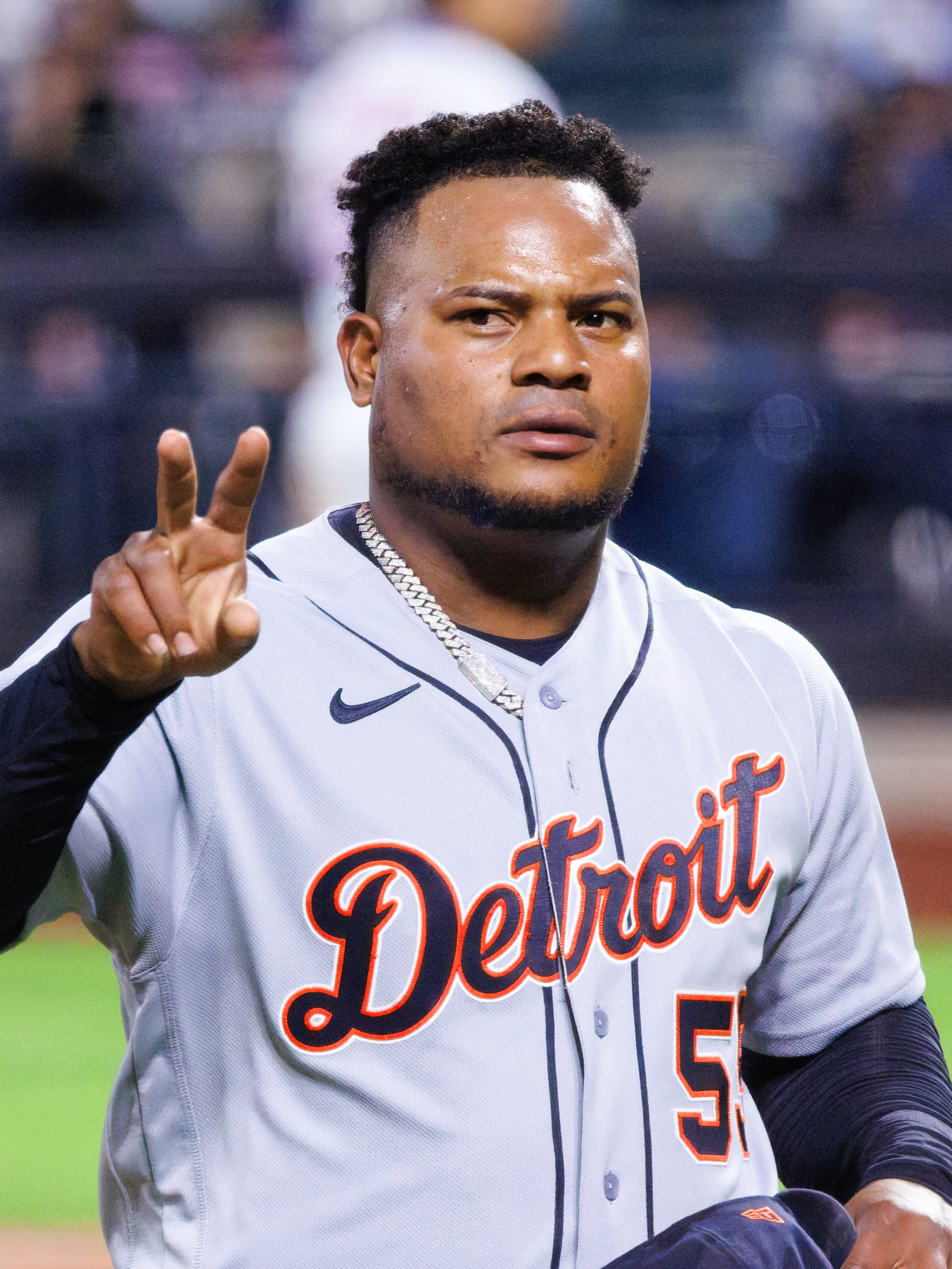
- Valdez with the Tigers in 2026

Detroit Tigers – No. 59
- Pitcher
- Born: November 19, 1993 (age 32); Palenque, Dominican Republic
- Bats: Right Throws: Left

MLB debut
- August 21, 2018, for the Houston Astros

MLB statistics (through September 23, 2026)
- Win–loss record: 91–64
- Earned run average: 3.46
- Strikeouts: 1,188
- Stats at Baseball Reference

Teams
- Houston Astros (2018–2025); Detroit Tigers (2026–present)

Career highlights and awards
- 2× All-Star (2022, 2023); World Series champion (2022); All-MLB First Team (2022); Pitched a no-hitter on August 1, 2023

Framber Valdez (born November 19, 1993) is a Dominican professional baseball pitcher for the Detroit Tigers of Major League Baseball (MLB). He has previously played in MLB for the Houston Astros. Valdez signed with the Astros as an international free agent in 2015, and made his MLB debut in 2018.

Nicknamed "La Grasa" (Spanish for "grease" or "fat," affectionately used in Dominican culture to denote a very stylish person) for his fashion style, Valdez enjoyed a banner year in 2022. That year, he became the Astros' Opening Day starter, an MLB All-Star, and an All-MLB First Team selection—each for the first time—while compiling an MLB record of 25 consecutive in-season quality starts. The Astros won that year's World Series, the first championship for Valdez, who was the winning pitcher in both Game 2 and the decisive Game 6.

== Early life ==
Framber Valdez was born in Palenque, San Cristóbal Province, Dominican Republic. He started pitching at age 16.

== Career ==
=== Houston Astros ===
==== Minor leagues ====
Valdez signed with the Houston Astros as an international free agent on March 19, 2015, for a $10,000 bonus. At age 21, he was five years older than most amateur free agent signings from his country. Two Astros scouts spotted him after a long day of viewing programs led by independent trainers. Watching him throw only six pitches—in the beams of car headlights as darkness fell—they offered him a tryout at their Dominican academy near Guayacanes. Valdez had had verbal agreements with seven teams prior to signing with the Astros, but each offer was withdrawn after the results of his physical revealed that he might require ulnar collateral ligament reconstruction, also known as "Tommy John surgery." Indeed, as a teenager, team after team declined to sign him for medical reasons that he "did not understand at all."

Valdez made his professional debut in 2015 with the Dominican Summer League Astros, going 4–1 with a 3.68 ERA over 36 2/3 innings. He split the 2016 season between the Greeneville Astros, Tri City ValleyCats, Quad Cities River Bandits, and Lancaster JetHawks, combining to go 4–5 with a 3.19 ERA over 73 1/3 innings. He split the 2017 season between the Buies Creek Astros and the Corpus Christi Hooks, going a combined 7–8 with a 4.16 ERA over 110 1/3 innings. Following the 2017 season, he played for the Mesa Solar Sox of the Arizona Fall League.

He split the 2018 minor league season between Corpus Christi and the Fresno Grizzlies, going a combined 6–5 with a 4.11 ERA over 103 innings.

==== 2018–2020 ====
The Astros promoted Valdez to the major leagues for the first time on August 21, 2018. He made his debut that day, pitching 4 1/3 innings and earning the win. With Houston in 2018, he went 4–1 with a 2.19 ERA over 37 innings. Valdez split the 2019 season between the Round Rock Express and Houston. With Round Rock, he went 5–2 with a 3.25 ERA over 44 1/3 innings. With Houston, he went 4–7 with a 5.86 ERA over 70 2/3 innings.

In 2020, Valdez was 5–3 with a 3.57 ERA in 11 games (10 starts), in which he threw 70 2/3 innings and struck out 76 batters (8th in the AL), and had the second-best home runs per nine innings allowed (HR/9 IP) ratio in the AL (0.637). He led the club in innings pitched, tied for the team lead in games won, and was named Astros Pitcher of the Year by the Houston chapter of the Baseball Writers' Association of America (BBWAA).

On September 29, 2020, in Game 1 of the American League Wild Card Series, Valdez became the first relief pitcher to throw five scoreless innings in the playoffs since Madison Bumgarner did so in Game 7 in the 2014 World Series. Valdez went 3–1 in the postseason, which saw the Astros reach the American League Championship Series (ALCS) after winning the first two rounds of the COVID-affected 2020 season. He was the winning pitcher in Game 6 of the LCS.

==== 2021 ====
On March 3, 2021, Valdez suffered a fractured left ring finger after he was hit in the hand by a Francisco Lindor ground ball in a spring training game. He returned on May 28. He led the major leagues in ground ball rate in 2021.

In 2021, Valdez was 11–6 with one complete game and a 3.14 ERA over 22 starts and 134 2/3 innings.

Valdez started Game 5 of the ALCS versus the Boston Red Sox at Fenway Park. He went eight innings to earn the win in a 9–1 final, limiting Boston to one run on three hits and a walk while striking out five. At several points during the game, Red Sox radio announcers Joe Castiglione and Will Flemming commented that Valdez was rubbing the fingers of his pitching hand against his cheek and temple each time he was given a new ball, which prompted an angry response from Houston sportswriters; no accusation of cheating was filed by the Red Sox.

Valdez was the seventh visiting pitcher at Fenway to go at least eight innings in a postseason game while allowing a run or fewer, and the first since Charles Nagy in 1998.

==== 2022 ====
Valdez avoided arbitration with the Astros on March 22, 2022, agreeing on a $3 million contract for the season.

On April 7, 2022, Valdez won his debut as an Opening Day starting pitcher, recording 6 2/3 scoreless innings in a 3–1 game. He achieved his first nine-inning complete game on May 30 versus the Athletics at Oakland Coliseum, a two-hitter and 5–1 Astros win. On July 3, Valdez set a new career-high with 13 strikeouts in a start versus the Angels. Twelve consecutive outs Valdez produced were via strikeout, supplanting the franchise record of nine previously accomplished by Don Wilson, Randy Johnson, and Gerrit Cole (twice). Valdez' 13 strikeouts were the first of 20 for the team, establishing a franchise record for a nine-inning game. (Note: In the series with Los Angeles, Astros pitching recorded 48 strikeouts to establish a major league record for strikeouts over a three-game series played without extra innings.)

Valdez was named to the MLB All-Star Game at Dodger Stadium. His 2.64 ERA ranked second on the Astros' staff and he also had pitched two complete games, tying for the major league lead. He pitched in the third inning of the All-Star Game, retiring all three batters faced, and received the win when the American League scored the go-ahead run after he had finished. Valdez became the first in Astros history to receive the win in an All-Star Game, and the first to receive a decision since Roger Clemens in 2004.

On September 12, Valdez threw his first major league complete-game shutout, a 7–0 win over the Detroit Tigers. Through September 14, 2022, Valdez had induced the highest career ground ball rate (66.3%) of any pitcher since 1988; only Derek Lowe had surpassed that figure in any individual season (2002 and 2006). Valdez threw 25 straight quality starts from April 25 to September 18, establishing the MLB record over a single season. It also set the record for most consecutive total in American League history and among left-handed pitchers, trailing only Bob Gibson and Jacob deGrom (tied at 26) for most consecutive all-time.

For the 2022 regular season, Valdez produced a 2.82 ERA and 17–6 record over 31 games started. He led the AL in innings pitched (201 1/3), batters faced (827), complete games (3), shutouts (1), quality starts (26), and HR/9 IP (0.492), all of which were career-bests to that point. His win total placed second in the AL behind teammate Justin Verlander, while his ERA was sixth, and 194 strikeouts were seventh, tied with Cristian Javier for the team lead. Valdez tied for the major league lead in ground ball double plays induced with 25.

As starter of Game 2 of the World Series, Valdez struck out nine Philadelphia Phillies batters over 6 1/3 innings to earn his first career win in World Series play following a 5–2 Astros victory. Valdez started and became the winning pitcher in the Astros' Game 6 Series clincher, working six innings while allowing one run on two hits and striking out nine to give him his first career championship. During the postseason, he was 4–0 with a 1.61 ERA and .144 batting average against.

==== 2023 ====
Valdez agreed to a $6.8 million contract for the season with the Astros on January 13, 2023, avoiding arbitration. A $3.8 million raise, it was the largest to date for pitcher advancing from year 1 to 2 of arbitration who had yet to win a Cy Young Award. Valdez drew his second consecutive Opening Day start for the Astros, tossing a scoreless outing versus the Chicago White Sox. He was named to the 2023 MLB All-Star Game, but did not pitch in the game.

On August 1, 2023, Valdez no-hit the Cleveland Guardians 2–0 at Minute Maid Park, the 16th no-hitter in Astros' history, the first with the minimum 27 batters faced, and first by an Astro left-hander. Needing only 93 pitches, Valdez threw 65 for strikes and struck out seven. Oscar González drew a walk as Cleveland's only baserunner and was erased by a double play. Martín Maldonado was the catcher. Valdez was named AL Player of the Week for July 31 – August 6 following the no-hit effort, his first weekly award. On August 25, Valdez departed after seven hitless innings, five walks surrendered and six strikeouts versus the Detroit Tigers; the no-hitter at Comerica Park remained intact until Kerry Carpenter singled off Bryan Abreu with one out in the eighth. Valdez became the seventh pitcher in history to turn two no-hit outings of at least seven innings in one season, and the first since Max Scherzer in 2015. In his next start, Valdez held Boston hitless until Justin Turner singled with one out in the fourth, extending a hitless streak to 10 1/3 innings.

For the 2023 season, Valdez posted a 3.45 ERA, 12–11 W–L record, and 200 strikeouts in 198 1/3 innings over 31 starts. He ranked third in the AL in innings pitched, fourth in H/9 (7.5), and in seventh in each of ERA, strikeouts, and walks plus hits per inning pitched (1.126, WHIP). He was 3rd in the AL with 22 double play ground balls. Along with Gerrit Cole, Valdez was one of two pitchers in the league who tossed two shutouts; he also became the first Astro to lead or tie for the league lead twice in shutouts, and his 55% groundball rate also led the AL. He was named Astros' Pitcher of the Year for the second time.

In the American League Division Series (ALDS) versus the Minnesota Twins, Valdez started Game 2 and pitched 4 1/3 innings, allowed five earned on seven hits and three walks and took the loss as the Twins prevailed, 6–4. Valdez started Game 2 of the ALCS versus the Texas Rangers, lasting 2 2/3 innings. He yielded five runs on six hits, including a third inning home run to Jonah Heim. Valdez took the loss as the Rangers prevailed, 5–4. In 3 playoff starts in 2023, Valdez surrendered 19 hits, 9.00 ERA, 1.037 on-base plus slugging (OPS) over 12 innings, struck out 17 and lost all 3 outings.

==== 2024 ====
On January 11, 2024, Valdez agreed to a $12.1 million contract for the season, avoiding salary arbitration.

On August 6, Valdez nearly no-hit the Texas Rangers in a 4–2 win with 8 2/3 no-hit innings at Globe Life Field, only to give up a hit by Corey Seager's two-run home run with two outs in the bottom of the ninth to break-up his second career no-hit bid. Additionally, he threw 5 perfect innings until Alex Bregman threw an error in the 6th that allowed a baserunner. Valdez departed after 7 no-hit innings on August 30 versus the Kansas City Royals; however, the no-hit bid was lost when the bullpen allowed a single in the eighth inning. Following the All-Star break, Valdez was 7–2 with a 1.96 ERA.

For the 2024 regular season, Valdez posted a record of 2.91 ERA, 15–7 win–loss record, and 169 strikeouts in 176 1/3 innings over 28 starts with 17 quality starts. He finished the 2024 season in 6th place of the list of ERA leaders, which he finished the season in the top 10. His 15 wins ranked fifth in the AL, and he ranked 9th in WHIP (1.162), 7th in H/9 (7.146), second in HR/9 (0.664), 3rd in Fielding Independent Pitching (FIP, 3.25), and 6th in championship Win Probability Added (cWPA, 1.9). Defensively, was third among AL pitchers with 3 double plays turned, and led MLB pitchers with 32 total double plays induced. Further, Valdez induced the highest ground ball rate (59.8%) in the AL, the fourth-lowest OPS against (.610), allowed the highest hard-hit percentage (45.6%), and 8th-highest exit velocity (89.9 mph).

In the AL Wild Card Series (WCS), Valdez started Game 1 versus Detroit. He lasted 4 1/3 innings, and surrendered three runs on seven hits, taking the loss as Houston was defeated, 3–1.

Valdez received his second career All-MLB Team selection, this time for the Second Team, finished seventh in the AL Cy Young balloting, and 15th as AL MVP.

==== 2025 ====
On January 9, 2025, Valdez agreed to an $18 million salary with the Astros for the season, in his final year of arbitration eligibility. Valdez made his fourth consecutive Opening Day start, tossing seven scoreless innings to lead a 3–1 win over the New York Mets. (Note: Valdez' start surpassed Dallas Keuchel for most consecutive Opening Day starts for the Astros by a left-hander, with 3; he also became the fifth in franchise history make at least four Opening Day starts, following J. R. Richard (5 consecutive), Mike Scott (5), Shane Reynolds (5), and Roy Oswalt (8).) After having hurled nine innings on May 30 against the Tampa Bay Rays with one run on three hits surrendered, batterymate Yainer Díaz connected for a walk-off home run in the bottom of the ninth inning to secure a complete-game, 2–1 victory. Valdez' effort tied Darryl Kile's club record for lowest pitch count in a complete game (83), who did so during his no-hitter in 1993. Valdez recorded his 974th strikeout on June 29 versus the Chicago Cubs to pass Kile for 10th place in Astros history. On July 5 versus the Los Angeles Dodgers, he reached 1,000 career innings. On July 29 versus the Washington Nationals, he recorded his 1,000th career strikeout when he struck out Alex Call in the third inning. With that strikeout, Valdez became the 10th pitcher in Astros history to reach 1,000 strikeouts.

After giving up a grand slam to Trent Grisham in the Astros' September 3 loss to the New York Yankees, Valdez was embroiled in controversy when he hit catcher Cesar Salazar in the chest with a 96 mile-per-hour sinker on the very next pitch. Valdez was accused by many of intentionally crossing up his catcher. Valdez and Salazar denied the allegations.

=== Detroit Tigers ===
On February 10, 2026, Valdez signed a three-year, $115 million contract with the Detroit Tigers. He began the 2026 Tigers season as the No. 2 starter, behind Tarik Skubal. On May 5, Valdez had his worst outing as a pitcher, giving up 10 runs in 3+ innings vs. the Boston Red Sox. In the fourth inning, after giving up back-to-back homers to Willson Contreras and Wilyer Abreu, he proceeded to hit Trevor Story in the back with a four-seam fastball. After the benches cleared, as the HBP seemed intentional, Valdez was subsequently ejected. As with the previous controversy with Salazar, Valdez denied the allegations. He was subsequently suspended for six games and fined, with manager A.J. Hinch also being suspended for one game.

== Pitch selection ==
Valdez throws a sinking fastball at 93 to 95 MPH (topping out at 99 MPH). His primary offspeed pitches are a curveball at 77 to 81 MPH and a changeup at 87 to 90 MPH. The curveball has been his toughest pitch to hit, with only a .144 batting average against for his career. He also occasionally throws a slider at 91 to 93 MPH and a four-seam fastball at 92 to 95 MPH. He is a ground ball pitcher, yielding almost 62 percent ground balls for his career versus less than 20 percent fly balls.

== Awards ==
Awards won by Framber Valdez
Award	Category	Result / Section	No.	Year	Ref.
Houston Astros	Pitcher of the Year		2	2020, 2023	

== Personal life ==
Valdez is married with three children. Valdez is naturally right-handed and performs everyday tasks with his right hand; he taught himself to throw left-handed as a child knowing the value of such pitchers in baseball.

During Game 2 of the 2022 World Series at Minute Maid Park, Valdez' father, José Antonio Valdéz Ramírez, witnessed his son pitch for the first time in the major leagues. Valdez Ramirez had not traveled previously to see him play due to a fear of flying.

Valdez is a Christian. He donated $100,000 to help build a church in his hometown.

== See also ==
- Houston Astros award winners and league leaders
- List of Houston Astros no-hitters
- List of Major League Baseball annual shutout leaders
- List of Major League Baseball no-hitters
- List of Major League Baseball players from the Dominican Republic
- List of World Series starting pitchers

Awards and achievements
Preceded by Jason Foley, Alex Lange, & Matt Manning	No-hitter pitcher August 1, 2023	Succeeded by Michael Lorenzen
Preceded by Zack Greinke	Houston Astros Opening Day starting pitcher 2022—2025	Succeeded by Hunter Brown
