= Mauricio Dubón =

Honduran baseball player (born 1994)

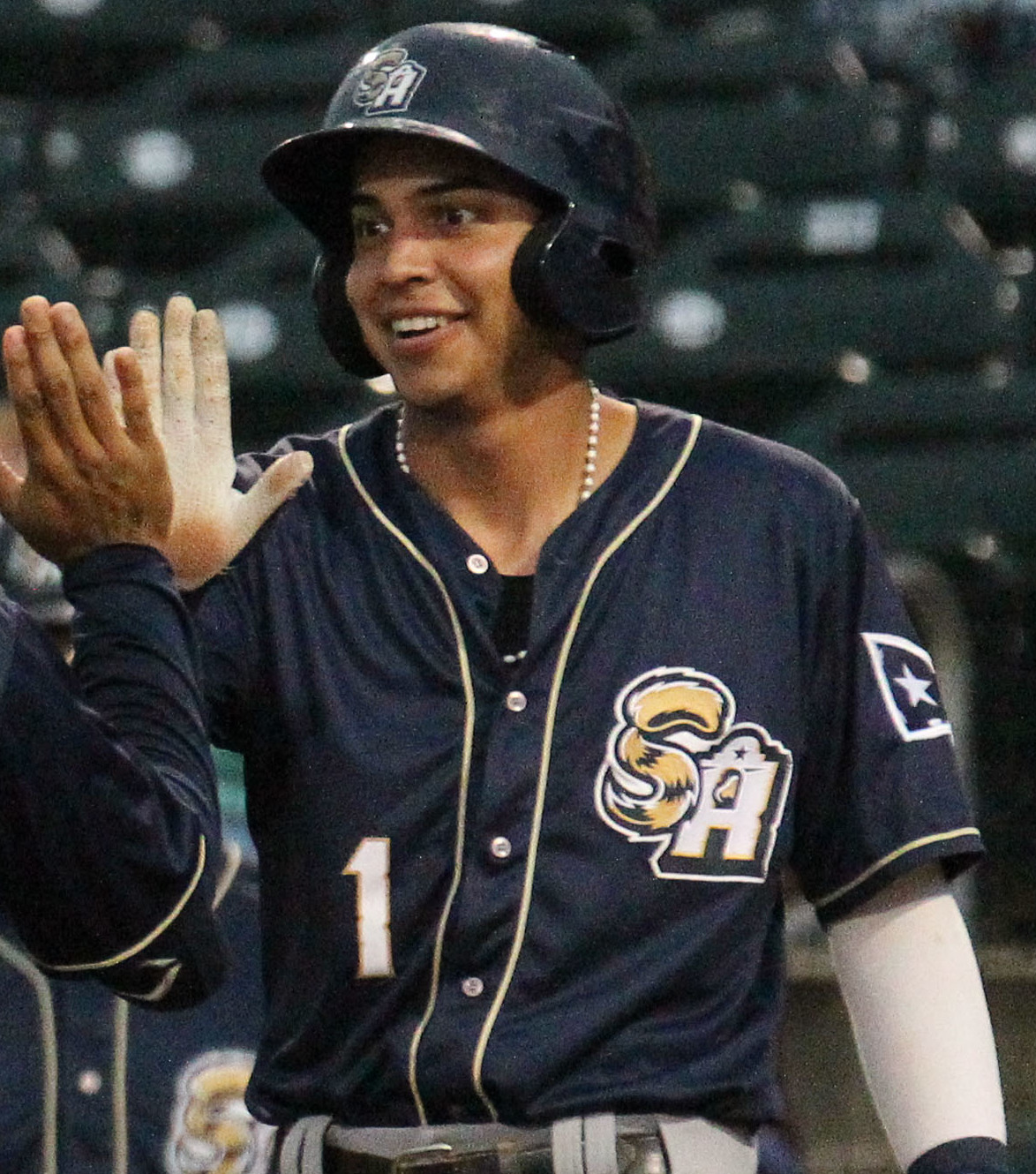
- Dubón with the San Antonio Missions in 2019

Free agent
- Utility player
- Born: July 19, 1994 (age 32); San Pedro Sula, Honduras
- Bats: Right Throws: Right

MLB debut
- July 7, 2019, for the Milwaukee Brewers

MLB statistics (through 2026 season)
- Batting average: .261
- Home runs: 51
- Runs batted in: 273
- Stats at Baseball Reference

Teams
- Milwaukee Brewers (2019); San Francisco Giants (2019–2022); Houston Astros (2022–2025); Atlanta Braves (2026)

Career highlights and awards
- World Series champion (2022); 3× Gold Glove Award (2023, 2025, 2026)

Mauricio Andre Dubón (Spanish pronunciation: [duˈβon] born July 19, 1994) is a Honduran professional baseball utility player who is a free agent. He has played in Major League Baseball (MLB) for the Milwaukee Brewers, San Francisco Giants, Houston Astros, and Atlanta Braves. He made his MLB debut in 2019.

From San Pedro Sula, Dubón moved to Sacramento, California, at age 15. He is the second native-born Honduran to play in the major leagues. In 2022, Dubón became the first-ever Honduran player to appear in the playoffs, as well as the first to win a World Series. In 2023, he became the first Honduran to win a Gold Glove Award.

== Early life ==
Mauricio Dubón was born and raised in San Pedro Sula, Honduras, where he attended Liceo Bilingüe Centroamericano High School. At age 15, a Christian mission group that was visiting Honduras saw Dubón play baseball and invited him to move to the United States to hone his baseball skills while attending high school. Dubón accepted the offer and moved to Sacramento, California, where he enrolled at Capital Christian High School as a foreign exchange student.

Dubón posted a .509 batting average (86-for-169) across his junior and senior years at Capital Christian High School, including 23 doubles, 14 triples, eight home runs, and 81 runs batted in. In 2013, he was drafted out of high school by the Boston Red Sox. Dubón is the first Capital Christian alumnus to have been drafted into professional baseball.

== Professional career ==
=== Boston Red Sox ===
The Red Sox selected Dubón in the 26th round of the 2013 MLB draft. After batting .245 in 20 games for the GCL Red Sox shortly after signing, Dubón was promoted to the Lowell Spinners in 2014 and ranked among the top ten in the New York–Penn League with a .320 batting average (82-for-256).

For the Greenville Drive in 2015, Dubón hit .364 through his first 11 games and had hit safely in 10 of those contests. He finished the season with High-A Salem Red Sox of the Carolina League, hitting a combined .288/.349/.376 slash line with 30 stolen bases in 120 games during the two stints. He was an SAL mid-season All Star. He then was invited by the Boston Red Sox to participate in their 2016 spring training.

Dubón continued his development at Salem in 2016, earning a spot in the Carolina League All-Star team to play in the 2016 California-Carolina League All-Star Game. He was promoted to Double-A Portland Sea Dogs following his appearance in the All-Star Game. At the time of his promotion, Dubón had a .306/.387/.379 line over 238 at-bats with a good approach producing more walks (33) than strikeouts (25). The .306 average was good for third in the Carolina League, and the on-base percentage ranked sixth. Besides, his speed has also continued to be a huge part of his game, stealing 24 bases in 28 attempts, for the sixth best in the league.

At Double-A, Dubón improved his slash line to .339/.371/.538 over 62 games with Portland, including 23 multi-hits games, six home runs and 40 RBI. Overall, he hit .323/.379/.461 with 101 runs, 69 RBI and 30 stolen bases in the two stints. Besides, he led the Red Sox minors system in runs and hits (157), while his .323 average was the second-best to Aneury Tavárez (.330). In addition, he finished third in stolen bases behind Yoan Moncada (45) and Danny Mars (31) and sixth in RBIs. He was a Carolina League mid-season All Star. He then was selected to join the Surprise Saguaros of the Arizona Fall League during the postseason.

=== Milwaukee Brewers ===
On December 6, 2016, the Red Sox traded Dubón, Travis Shaw, and Josh Pennington to the Milwaukee Brewers in exchange for Tyler Thornburg. He spent 2017 with both the Biloxi Shuckers and the Colorado Springs Sky Sox, posting a combined .274 batting average with eight home runs, 57 RBIs and 38 stolen bases in 129 total games between both teams. He was a Southern League mid-season All Star. The Brewers added him to their 40-man roster after the season.

MLB.com ranked Dubón as Milwaukee's 11th-ranked prospect going into the 2018 season. He spent the 2018 season with the Colorado Springs Sky Sox, batting .343 with four home runs, 18 RBIs, and six stolen bases in only 27 games due to injury.

He played most of 2019 with the San Antonio Missions, batting .297/.333/.475 with 59 runs, 16 home runs, and 47 RBIs in 404 at bats.

On July 7, 2019, the Brewers promoted Dubón to the major leagues. He made his MLB debut that day against the Pittsburgh Pirates, grounding out as a pinch hitter; he had two major league at bats with the Brewers for the season. He became the second Honduran to make it to MLB, after outfielder Gerald Young.

=== San Francisco Giants ===
On July 31, 2019, the Brewers traded Dubón to the San Francisco Giants in exchange for pitchers Ray Black and Drew Pomeranz. With the Sacramento River Cats, the Triple–A affiliate of the Giants, in 2019 he batted .323/.391/.485 with 23 runs, 4 home runs, and 9 RBI in 99 at–bats. Dubón started at second base for the Giants on August 29, getting his first Major League hit, with his California family in attendance. With the Giants in 2019, he batted .279/.312/.442 with 12 runs, 4 home runs, and 9 RBI in 104 at–bats. He played 22 games at second base, and 9 games at shortstop.

In 2020, Dubón batted .274/.337/.389 for the Giants with 21 runs, 4 home runs, and 19 RBI in 117 at–bats in 54 games. He played 44 games in center field, 8 games at shortstop, and 8 games at second base.

In the 2021 regular season, Dubón batted .240/.278/.377 with 9 doubles, 5 home runs, and 22 RBI in 175 at–bats in 74 games with the Giants. He played 27 games in center field, 21 games at shortstop, 20 games at second base, and 12 games at third base. He also played for the River Cats in 2021, where he batted .332/.410/.498 with 41 runs, 8 home runs, 31 RBI, and 9 steals in 247 at–bats.

=== Houston Astros ===
==== 2022 ====
On May 14, 2022, Dubón was traded to the Houston Astros in exchange for catcher Michael Papierski. With this trade, Dubón also joined Gerald Young as the second Honduran to play for the Astros.

Dubón started at shortstop on June 19, 2022, and hit his first home run in an Astros uniform, in the seventh inning versus Chicago White Sox starter Michael Kopech as the Astros won, 4–3. On August 21, Dubón batted leadoff and started at second base versus the Atlanta Braves, collecting two hits, a stolen base, and scoring two runs to catalyze a 5–4 Houston win. Dubón started in center field on August 28 versus the Baltimore Orioles, collecting one single and two outfield assists, rifling out both Robinson Chirinos and Jorge Mateo at third base.

In 2022, Dubón batted .208/.254/.294 in 197 at bats. On defense, he played 45 games in center field, 17 games at shortstop, 16 games at second base, nine games in left field, and three games in right field. He appeared in each of the Astros' series during the postseason for a total of six games. In the World Series, the Astros defeated the Philadelphia Phillies in six games to give Dubón his first career World Series title. He also became the first Honduran-born player in Major League history to both play in and win a World Series.

==== 2023 ====
On January 13, 2023, Dubón avoided arbitration with the Astros, agreeing to a one-year, $1.4 million contract for the season. Early in April, he took over regular duties at second base and as leadoff hitter for Jose Altuve, who was recovering from a fractured thumb sustained during the World Baseball Classic (WBC). From April 2–26, Dubón compiled a 20-game hitting streak, making him the 15th Astro to do so, and the longest since 2011 when Hunter Pence hit in 23 consecutive games. When Altuve returned from the injured list on May 19, Dubón's .309 batting average ranked sixth in the American League (AL) and his 46 hits led the Astros. On September 4, 2023, Dubón and Altuve batted ninth and leadoff, respectively, and connected for back-to-back home runs in the sixth and ninth innings versus the Texas Rangers. Per OptaSTATS, it was the first time in major league history that the number nine and leadoff hitters hit back-to-back home runs twice in the same game. It was Dubón's first career multi-home run game. Dubón delivered his first career walk-off hit in the major leagues on September 20, 2023, a single versus Danny Coulombe of the Baltimore Orioles to score Yainer Díaz.

For the 2023 season, Dubón reached career highs in nearly every offensive category, playing in 132 games, accruing 492 plate appearances, and batting .278/.309/.411. His career highs included 76 runs scored, 130 hits, 26 doubles, 3 triples, 10 home runs, 46 RBI, 7 stolen bases, 19 walks, and 70 strikeouts. He appeared most at second base (79 games) and center field (29), and also at shortstop (9), left field (9), right field (2), first base (2), and third base (1). Named a Gold Glove finalist at two positions—second base and utility player—Dubón was awarded the Gold Glove for utility players and became the first-ever Honduran player to win a Gold Glove Award.

==== 2024 ====
On July 31, 2024, Dubón hit his first career pinch hit home run, a two-run home run the sixth inning to cap a 5–4 win over the Pittsburgh Pirates. Following the regular season, he was announced as the recipient of the annual Darryl Kile Good Guy Award by the Houston chapter of the Baseball Writers' Association of America (BBWAA). Dubón played in a career–high 137 games for the Astros in 2024, slashing .269/.296/.361 with four home runs and 47 RBI. On October 9, it was announced that he would be undergoing surgery to repair a torn ulnar collateral ligament in his thumb.

==== 2025 ====
On January 9, 2025, the Astros signed Dubón to a $5 million contract for the season, avoiding arbitration. As a starter in left field on June 6 at Progressive Field, Dubón recorded two assists in the bottom of the first inning against the Cleveland Guardians to become the sixth player in franchise history to notch two outfield assists in the same inning. (Note: Dubón joined Brian Bogusevic in a 2011 contest against the Pittsburgh Pirates—the most recent—Richard Hidalgo, Jim Pankovits, Cesar Cedeño and Rusty Staub.) On June 15, Dubón's single to the left field wall with two outs in the 10th inning scored Jake Meyers as the go-ahead run and ignite a walk-off, 2–1 win over the Minnesota Twins, his second career walk-off hit. Dubón played in 133 games for the Astros in 2025, slashing .241/.289/.355 with seven home runs and 33 RBI. He appeared most at left field (48 games) and second base (46), and also at shortstop (33), third base (24), center field (17), first base (4), and right field (3). On November 2, Dubón was awarded the Gold Glove for utility players for the second time in his career.

=== Atlanta Braves ===
On November 19, 2025, the Astros traded Dubón to the Atlanta Braves in exchange for Nick Allen. Dubón was recognized as the Braves' nominee for the Heart & Hustle Award, and won the third Gold Glove Award of his career.

== Personal life ==
Dubón is a Christian. He's also a fan of English football club Manchester City. Dubón met his wife Nancy in 2017. The couple married in 2020, and have a son, born in 2024.

In Honduras, a planned baseball stadium in Juticalpa, Olancho, will be named after him. The construction of Estadio Mauricio Dubón was expected to be completed by 2022, but was delayed due to the COVID-19 pandemic.

== See also ==
- Houston Astros award winners and league leaders
