= Yainer Díaz =

Dominican baseball player (born 1998)

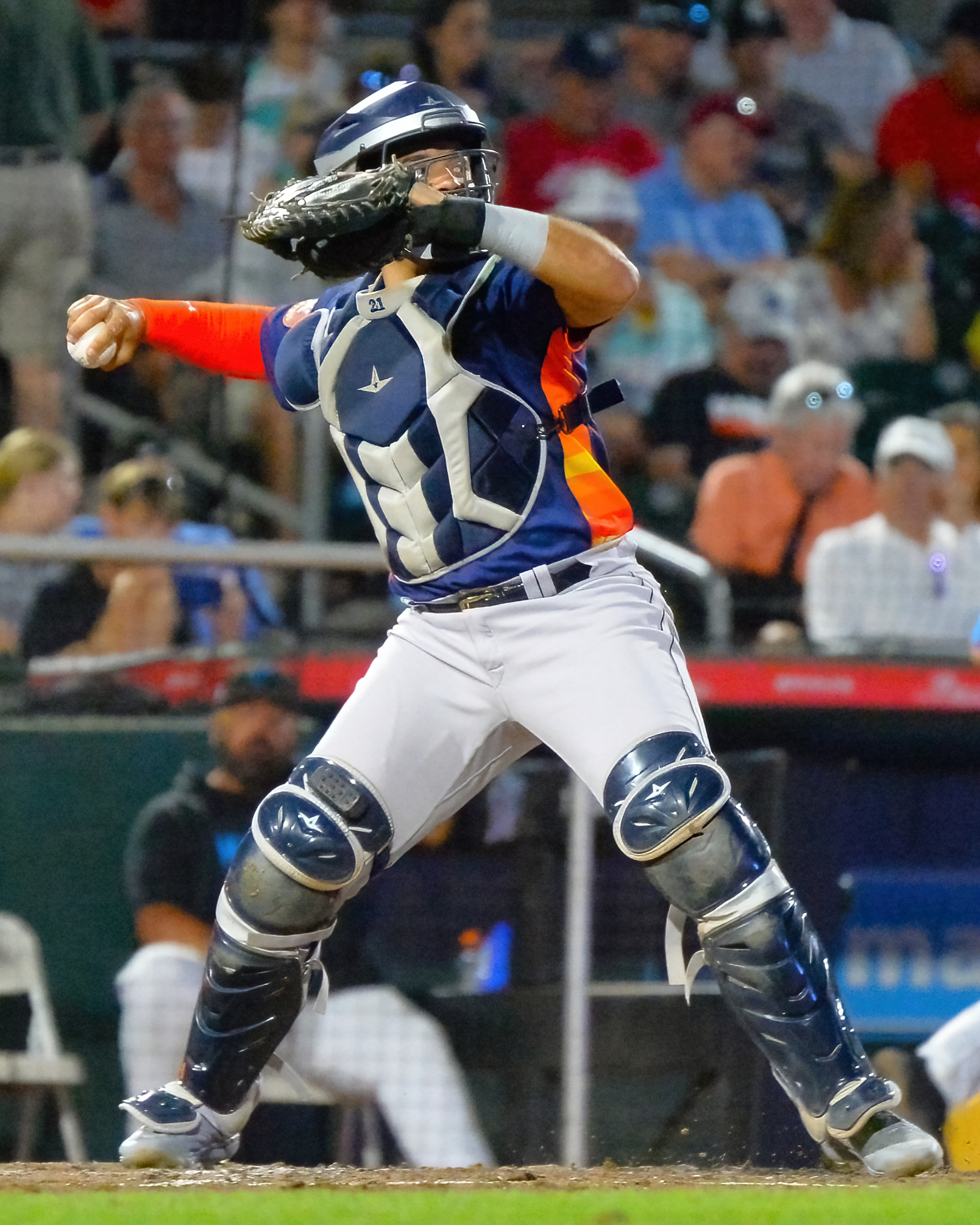
- Díaz with the Houston Astros in 2023

Houston Astros – No. 21
- Catcher
- Born: September 21, 1998 (age 28); Azua, Dominican Republic
- Bats: Right Throws: Right

MLB debut
- September 2, 2022, for the Houston Astros

MLB statistics (through 2026 season)
- Batting average: .280
- Home runs: 73
- Runs batted in: 260
- Stats at Baseball Reference

Teams
- Houston Astros (2022–present)

Yainer Radhames Díaz (born September 21, 1998) is a Dominican professional baseball catcher for the Houston Astros of Major League Baseball (MLB). Díaz signed with the Cleveland Indians as an international free agent in 2016. In 2021, he was traded to the Astros, with whom he made his MLB debut in 2022.

== Professional career ==
=== Cleveland Indians ===
Díaz signed with the Cleveland Indians as an international free agent on December 7, 2016. He made his professional debut in 2017, playing in 42 games for the Dominican Summer League Indians and slashing .294/.321/.379 with one home run and 21 runs batted in. Díaz spent the 2018 season with the rookie-level Arizona League Indians, playing in 41 contests and posting a batting line of .355/.387/.503 with 2 home runs and 28 RBI.

In 2019, Díaz began the year with the AZL Indians, hitting a torrid .451/.477/.707 with 5 home runs and 22 RBI. The performance gifted him a promotion to the Low-A Mahoning Valley Scrappers, where he hit .274 in 34 contests. Díaz did not play in a game in 2020 due to the cancellation of the minor league season as a response to the COVID-19 pandemic.

He returned to action in 2021 with the Single-A Lynchburg Hillcats, slashing .314/.357/.464 with 5 home runs and 50 RBI in 61 appearances.

=== Houston Astros ===
==== Minor leagues (2021–2022) ====
On July 30, 2021, the Indians traded Díaz alongside relief pitcher Phil Maton to the Houston Astros in exchange for outfielder Myles Straw. Díaz was assigned to the Single-A Fayetteville Woodpeckers upon being acquired, and ended the year on a strong note, hitting .396 in 25 games for the High-A Asheville Tourists.

Díaz was promoted to the Triple-A Sugar Land Space Cowboys for the 2022 season, batting .306 with an .898 on-base plus slugging percentage (OPS) in 486 plate appearances. He was a 2022 All-Star Futures Game selectee. Díaz hit a three-run home run on August 19, 2022, in the sixth inning of the second game of a doubleheader versus the Oklahoma City Dodgers in which the Space Cowboys scored 17 runs to set a franchise record.

==== Major league debut (2022) ====
The Astros called Díaz up to the major league roster on September 1, 2022. He made his major league debut on September 2, 2022, starting as the designated hitter versus Los Angeles at Angel Stadium. He was 0-for-3 with a bases loaded walk for his first run batted in (RBI). He got his first hit, a double, against Javy Guerra of the Tampa Bay Rays in the eighth inning on September 20. Following the regular season, Díaz was named the Houston Astros' Minor League Player of the Year.

==== Rookie season (2023) ====
On March 28, 2023, it was announced that Díaz had made the Astros’ Opening Day roster, his first such selection. He hit his first major league home run on May 14, 2023, versus Lucas Giolito at Guaranteed Rate Field, leading a 4–3 win over the Chicago White Sox. Díaz collected his first career four-hit game in the major leagues versus the Toronto Blue Jays at the Rogers Centre on June 5. He hit two home runs on July 5 for his first multi-home run game, leading a 6–4 win over the Colorado Rockies at Minute Maid Park. On July 24, Díaz recorded the first walk-off hit of his career, a single to score Kyle Tucker and cap a 10–9 victory over the Texas Rangers. On September 2, Díaz homered versus Luis Severino of the New York Yankees—his 20th to became the seventh Astros rookie to reach the milestone.

For the 2023 season, Díaz played in 104 games, batting .282 with 100 hits, 23 home runs, 60 RBI, and an .846 OPS. He played in 60 games as catcher, 38 as designated hitter, and 8 at first base. His 30% of baserunners caught stealing (15-of-50) ranked fourth in the American League (AL). Among AL rookies with at least 350 plate appearances, he ranked first in slugging percentage (.540, SLG), second in batting and OPS, and tied for third in home runs. His 23 home runs placed second for rookies in franchise history to the teammate Yordan Alvarez' 27 hit in 2019, while his 14 home runs as catcher tied Mitch Meluskey (2000) for the club's rookie record at the position. The Houston chapter of the Baseball Writers' Association of America (BBWAA) named Díaz the Houston Astros' Rookie of the Year.

==== 2024 ====
On April 1, 2024, Díaz caught Ronel Blanco's first career no-hitter, in a 10–0 victory against the Toronto Blue Jays. This was the 17th no-hitter in franchise history. Díaz caught 3 additional no-hit bids of 7 innings or more: on June 16 (Blanco versus the Detroit Tigers relieved by Ryan Pressly, 7 2/3 innings); on August 6 (Framber Valdez starting versus the Texas Rangers, 8 2/3 innings); on August 30 (Valdez versus the Kansas City Royals relieved by Bryan Abreu, 7 2/3 innings). In a 6–2 loss to the Pittsburgh Pirates on July 30, 2024, Díaz was 4-for-4 with a home run, his second career four-hit game. Over his previous 30 games, he had hit .374 with 46 hits and 24 RBI. Díaz hit his first career walk-off home run on August 19, 2024, to secure a 5–4 victory over the Boston Red Sox.

For the 2024 regular season, Díaz batted .299/.325/.441/.766, 29 doubles, 16 home runs, and 84 RBI over 148 games, his first full major league season. He appeared in 102 games as catcher, 37 as designated hitter, and 11 as first baseman. Díaz ranked 5th in the AL in batting, 7th in hits (175), and 4th in sacrifice flies (8); he led the league in double plays ground into with 22. He also ranked second on the club in base hits and RBI.

==== 2025 ====
Díaz connected for his first career grand slam on April 11, 2025, while driving in a new career-high five runs to lead a 14–3 win over the Los Angeles Angels. Díaz' solo home run on May 18 erased a no-hit and shutout bid of 6 2/3 innings by Jack Leiter of the Rangers. After batterymate Framber Valdez had hurled nine innings with one run on three hits surrendered on May 30, Díaz belted his second career walk-off home run in the bottom of the ninth inning to secure a 2–1 win over Tampa Bay and complete-game victory for Valdez.

==== 2026 ====
Díaz hit the first of the three consecutive home runs on June 23, 2026, which was the eighth time in club history three players had done so. Cam Smith hit the second, and Taylor Trammell the third, all against Shane Bieber during the fourth inning at the Rogers Centre. (Note: The most recent instance of the Astros hitting three successive home run was on July 19, 2019, by Jose Altuve, Alex Bregman, and Yordan Alvarez, versus the Texas Rangers.) On July 29 and 31, 2026, Díaz produced successive four-hit games for the first time in his career while homering in both games, and first four-hit performance since July 30, 2024. He became the 16th batter in team history to record four hits each over consecutive games. (Note: Succeeded Yordan Alvarez on September 3 and 4, 2025. Criteria: Longest streak of consecutive games, playing for HOU, in the regular season, requiring Hits ≥ 4, sorted by most games matching criteria.) He played in 98 contests for the season, batting .285, 14 home runs, 45 RBI, 12 walks, and 57 strikeouts. Díaz ranked in the bottom 1 percentile in walk rate, in bottom 4 in chase rate, and top 82 in strikeout rate. During the AL Wild Card Series, Díaz went 0-for-8 prior to a sweep of the Astros by the Chicago White Sox.

== See also ==
- List of Major League Baseball players from the Dominican Republic
