= Yordan Alvarez =

Cuban baseball player (born 1997)

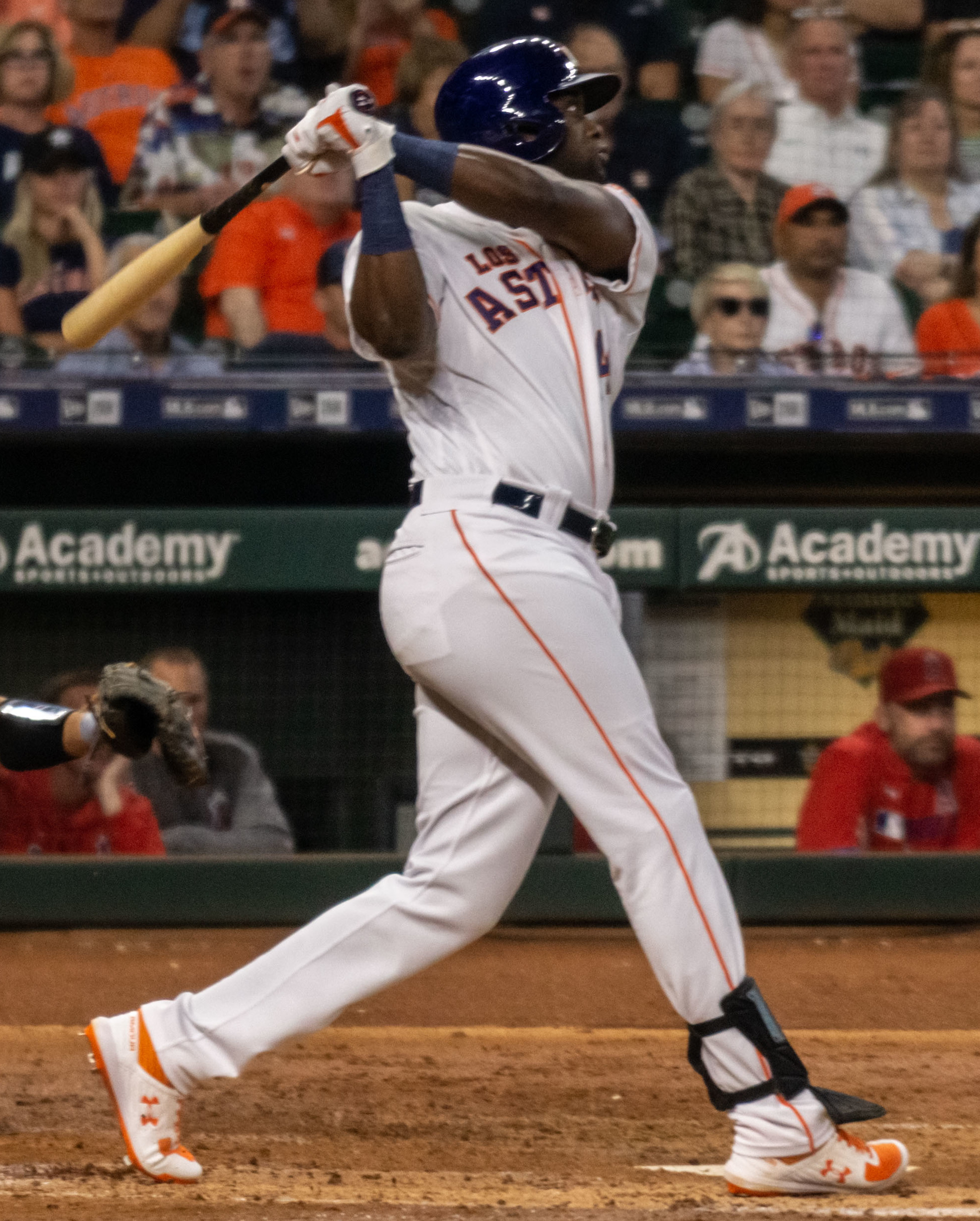
- Alvarez with the Houston Astros in 2019

Houston Astros – No. 44
- Designated hitter / Left fielder
- Born: June 27, 1997 (age 29); Las Tunas, Cuba
- Bats: Left Throws: Right

MLB debut
- June 9, 2019, for the Houston Astros

MLB statistics (through 2026 season)
- Batting average: .300
- Home runs: 212
- Runs batted in: 599
- Stats at Baseball Reference

Teams
- Houston Astros (2019–present)

Career highlights and awards
- 4× All-Star (2022–2024, 2026); World Series champion (2022); AL MVP (2026); 2× All-MLB First Team (2022, 2026); AL Rookie of the Year (2019); ALCS MVP (2021); 2× Silver Slugger Award (2022, 2026); AL Hank Aaron Award (2026); MLB batting champion (2026); AL Comeback Player of the Year (2026)
Medals
Men's baseball
Representing Cuba
15U Baseball World Championship
Silver medal – second place	2012 Chihuahua	Team

Yordan Ruben Alvarez (born June 27, 1997) is a Cuban professional baseball designated hitter and left fielder for the Houston Astros of Major League Baseball (MLB). He made his MLB debut in 2019 with the Astros. Alvarez stands 6 ft 4 in (1.93 m), weighs 237 pounds (108 kg), bats left-handed and throws right-handed. He is a four-time All-Star.

Prior to his American career, Alvarez played two seasons in the Cuban National Series for Las Tunas. He defected from Cuba in 2016 to establish residency in Haiti, where he first signed with the Los Angeles Dodgers as an international free agent. Houston acquired him via trade from the Dodgers in 2016 before he made his professional debut. In 2019, he was unanimously named American League (AL) Rookie of the Year after posting the highest slugging percentage (.655) by a qualified rookie in history.

After missing all but two games of the abbreviated 2020 season due to injury, Alvarez became known for his slugging numbers and for being a clutch hitter. He won the 2021 ALCS MVP award, and in 2022, he hit the first walk-off home run in postseason history with his team trailing by multiple runs. He also hit a go-ahead home run in the 2022 World Series to secure his first championship. The 2026 season saw him set a career-high in home runs with 42 to go with 106 runs driven in and a league-leading batting average of .316 on his way to winning the AL MVP Award, becoming the first Astro to win the award since 2017.

== Professional career ==
=== Cuban National Series ===
Yordan Alvarez played two seasons in the Cuban National Series (CNS) for the Leñadores de Las Tunas. In his second season, 2014–15, he batted .351, ranking second on the Leñadores, and hit one double and one home run over 40 games and 125 plate appearances.

==== Defection from Cuba ====
Alvarez defected from Cuba and established residency in Haiti in 2016. While in Haiti, he met future Houston Astros teammate Yuli Gurriel and his younger brother, Lourdes Jr., also a future major leaguer, and fellow Cubans. Alvarez then traveled to West Palm Beach, Florida, where the Astros were building their spring training site, The Ballpark of the Palm Beaches. He befriended Astros scout Charlie Gonzalez, who lobbied for club officials to sign Alvarez. The club declined, however, having already incurred signing penalties from Gurriel's five-year, $47.5 million contract. Alvarez signed with the Los Angeles Dodgers as an international free agent in June 2016 for $2 million.

=== Minor leagues ===
In August 2016, the Dodgers, in need of relief pitching, traded Alvarez to the Houston Astros for Josh Fields, before he played a single game in the minors. Dodgers President of Baseball Operations Andrew Friedman later acknowledged that trading Alvarez was "a mistake" and admitted, "I obviously wish I would have said yes to other names [the Astros] asked for before him." (Friedman first believed that they wanted pitcher Yadier Alvarez.)

Alvarez made his professional debut in 2016 with the Dominican Summer League Astros, where he spent the rest of the year, batting .341 with a .974 OPS in 16 games.

Alvarez started 2017 with the Quad Cities River Bandits and was promoted to the Buies Creek Astros during the season. In 90 total games between the River Bandits and Astros, he batted .304/.379/.481 with 12 home runs and 69 RBIs in 335 at bats. He played in the 2017 All-Star Futures Game.

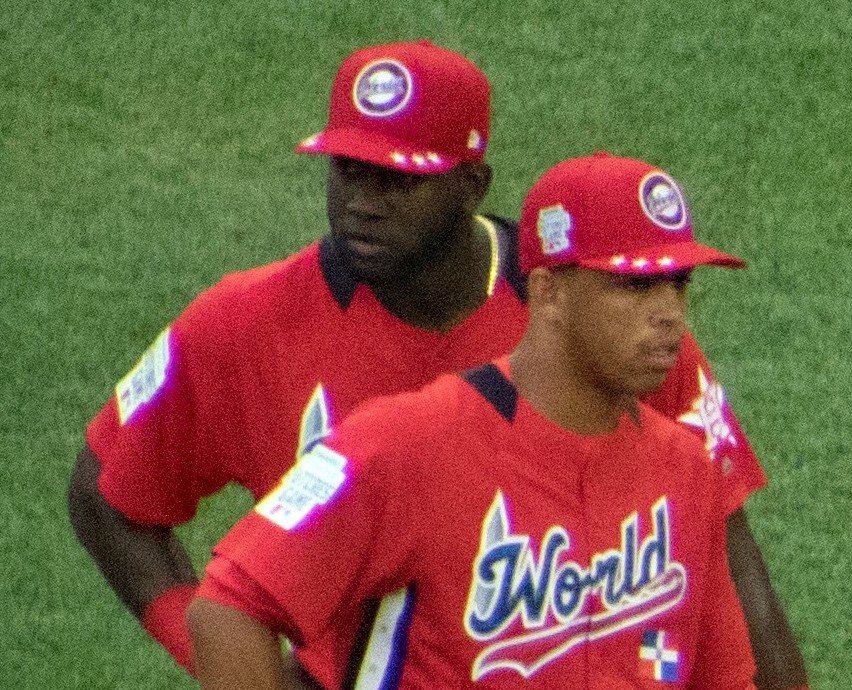
Alvarez (left) with Luis García Jr. at the 2018 All-Star Futures Game

Alvarez was ranked among the top prospects in the minor leagues prior to the 2018 season. He started the 2018 season playing with the Corpus Christi Hooks of the Class AA Texas League. Despite being a right-handed thrower, Alvarez was incorrectly listed as a left-handed thrower by many websites prior to 2018 spring training. He split the 2018 season between Corpus Christi and the Fresno Grizzlies of the Class AAA Pacific Coast League, hitting a combined .293/.369/.534/.904 with 63 runs, 20 home runs and 74 RBIs in 335 at bats.

Alvarez opened the 2019 season with the Round Rock Express of the Pacific Coast League. Prior to his first major league call-up, Alvarez batted .343/.443/.742 with 50 runs, 38 walks, 23 home runs, 71 RBIs, and an on-base plus slugging percentage (OPS) of 1.185 in 213 at bats with Round Rock. He was leading the minor leagues in home runs, RBI and total bases (158), and was the Astros' #3 prospect and MLB.com's #23 overall prospect.

=== Houston Astros ===
==== 2019 ====
On June 9, 2019, the Astros selected Alvarez's contract and promoted him to make his major league debut that afternoon versus the Baltimore Orioles. He went 1-for-3 with a two-run home run in his debut. The following game, Alvarez again homered, this time versus Matt Albers of the Milwaukee Brewers. He became the first Astro to homer in both of his first two games. Alvarez became the fourth player in Major League Baseball (MLB) history to hit four home runs in his first five career games when he homered off of Clayton Richard of the Toronto Blue Jays, joining Trevor Story, Yasiel Puig and Mike Jacobs. On June 23, Alvarez hit a 2-run home run for his 7th home run of the season in only 12 games, establishing an Astros franchise record. He also became the first player in MLB history to drive in 16 runs in his first 12 games. He won the American League (AL) Rookie of the Month Award for both June and July — the first Astro to do so — after garnering 48 hits, batting .336, 13 doubles, 13 homers and 39 RBI, .699 slugging, and 1.120 OPS. He also led MLB with a 1.120 OPS since his debut, and was second in the AL with a .421 OBP, fourth in SLG, sixth in RBI, and seventh in average. Thus, he emerged as a leading contender for AL Rookie of the Year honors despite his late start to the season.

On August 10, Alvarez connected for both his first major league grand slam and three-home run game in a 23–2 romp at Camden Yards over the Orioles. (Note: Alvarez' three-home run game was the first by an Astros player since Carlos Lee on April 13, 2007, during which Lee also hit a grand slam.) With a career-high seven runs driven in, his total stood at 51 to establish the major league record for the first 45 games. The 23 runs scored accounted for a single-game franchise record. During a homestand at Minute Maid Park, Alvarez drove in six runs on three doubles in a 21–1 outburst over the Seattle Mariners on September 8. The following day, he hit home run numbers 23 and 24 in 15–0 win versus the Oakland Athletics to break Carlos Correa's franchise record for rookies, set in 2015.

Alvarez concluded the 2019 campaign batting .313/.412/.655 with 27 home runs and 75 RBIs in 313 at bats, and was the ninth-youngest ballplayer in the AL. Moreover, Alvarez' .655 slugging percentage (SLG) and 1.067 on-base plus slugging percentage (OPS) were both the highest in history for a qualified rookie, (Note: Minimum 350 plate appearances.) exceeding Shoeless Joe Jackson's .590 SLG and 1.058 OPS during the 1911 campaign. Alvarez led AL rookies in on-base percentage (.412 OBP) and extra base hits (53), and was second in HR and RBI. Hence, Alvarez was recognized as the unanimous winner of AL Rookie of the Year honors, (Note: Alvarez became the third Astro to win the award, preceded by Jeff Bagwell in 1991 and Correa in 2015.) among other rookie awards. Alvarez was voted the Players Choice Award for AL Outstanding Rookie. Likewise, the Houston chapter of the Baseball Writers' Association of America (BBWAA) voted Alvarez as the Astros' Rookie of the Year.

Going into World Series play versus the Washington Nationals, Alvarez had slumped to a 1–for-22 performance in his first American League Championship Series (ALCS) versus the New York Yankees. In Game 5 of the World Series, he hit a two-run home run off Joe Ross to cap a 7–1 Houston victory. It was Alvarez' first career home run in both World Series and postseason play, and first home run since September 21. Alvarez rebounded to bat .412 and .524 OBP during the World Series; however, the Nationals defeated the Astros, 4-games-to-3, to claim the championship.

==== 2020 ====
Alvarez sat out the beginning of the 2020 season after having tested positive for COVID-19. He returned in August and played just two games before undergoing arthroscopic surgery on both of his knees, shutting him down for the rest of the season.

==== 2021 ====
On May 7, 2021, Alvarez drove in his 100th run, doing so in his 114th career game as part of a 10–4 win over the Toronto Blue Jays. He was the seventh-fastest player to reach 100 RBIs in league history and the fastest to do so since the expansion era started in 1961. The next game, he homered and drove in three more in an 8–4 loss to the Blue Jays for 103 RBIs in 115 games.

Alvarez hit his 30th home run of the season on September 13; at the age of 24, he was the second Astro to hit 30 home runs in a season at that age after Alex Bregman, who hit 31 in 2018. On September 22, Alvarez drove in two runs on a home run in the first inning against the Los Angeles Angels to score his 100th RBI of the season. He was the second-youngest Astro to reach 100 RBIs in one season, trailing César Cedeño, who did so at the age of 23 in 1974.

In the 2021 season, he batted .277/.346/.531 and led the Astros in home runs (33), RBIs (104), and strikeouts (145) and tied for the team lead in double plays grounded into (GIDP, 16) in 537 at bats. He was named All-MLB Team Second Team at DH, his second career selection.

In Game 5 of the ALCS, the Astros faced Boston Red Sox pitcher Chris Sale at Fenway Park in a 9–1 win. Alvarez logged three hits and three RBIs versus the left-handed ace, all to the opposite field, including one home run that cleared the Green Monster. This marked the first occasion in Alvarez's career in which he had collected that many opposite-field hits, and the first time facing Sale; meanwhile Sale had allowed four total hits to left-handed batters over his 42 2/3 innings in 2021. The last left-handed batter to realize three hits in one game versus Sale was David Ortiz on July 30, 2015. In Game 6, Alvarez collected four hits–including two doubles and one triple–as Houston prevailed, 5–0, the decisive game of the ALCS. He hit .522, with a 1.408 OPS, three doubles, one triple, one home run, six RBIs, and seven runs scored. His .522 average set a record for ALCS play, eclipsing Kevin Youkilis' .500 average hit in 2007, and he became the first player in MLB history to out-hit his entire opposing team over the final two games of a playoff series. For this, Alvarez was named ALCS Most Valuable Player (MVP), becoming the fourth Cuban-born player and the first designated hitter since Ortiz to win the award. Alvarez did not carry his success into the World Series, in which he went 2-for-20 as the Astros lost to the Atlanta Braves in six games.

==== 2022 ====
In a 6–1 win versus Washington at Nationals Park on May 13, 2022, Alvarez hit his 11th home run, helping to extend an Astros' winning streak to 11 games. As it was his 27th appearance of the season, the home run established a new career best for the fewest games to reach the total, surpassing 11 home runs in 30 games during his 2019 rookie season. On June 2, 2022, Alvarez signed a six-year contract extension with the Astros worth $115 million; the deal bought out three remaining free-agent years that would keep him on the team until the 2028 season. In the week ending June 5, he batted .565/.630/1.217 with two walks, four home runs, eight RBI, and one strikeout in six games. He was named AL Player of the Week for the first time on June 6. On June 29, Alvarez left the game versus the New York Mets. He was carted off the field following an outfield collision with shortstop Jeremy Peña, both of whom were running for a Dominic Smith fly ball.

Alvarez won the AL Player of the Month Award for June, his first. Over 23 games, he batted .418/.510/.835/1.346, garnering four doubles, one triple, nine home runs, and 28 RBI. He led the league in batting, on-base percentage, slugging percentage, OPS, and RBI, and ranked fourth in the AL in home runs. He posted an equal number of bases on balls and strikeouts (13). Alvarez returned to play as DH versus Los Angeles after missing two games due to the collision with Peña, going 0-for-4 with a walk. He hit his first career walk-off home run versus the Kansas City Royals on July 4, securing a 7–6 win. On July 5, he hit his 25th home run and turned his first career double play, first catching a Nicky Lopez fly ball. Alvarez then rifled the ball to Martín Maldonado at home plate on a 92.5 miles per hour (148.9 km/h) carom, who tagged out Hunter Dozier.

MLB announced Alvarez's selection on July 10 to the MLB All-Star Game at Dodger Stadium as a reserve DH, his first career selection. He was leading the major leagues in OPS (1.058) and third in home runs (26) at the time. The same day, however, the Astros placed him on the 10-day injured list (IL) due to right hand inflammation, ruling him out for the All-Star Game. On July 21, the Astros activated Alvarez. Alvarez hit his 30th home run on July 29 versus the Seattle Mariners to establish a team record for reaching the mark in the fewest appearances, doing so in his 84th game of the season. On July 31, he delivered a walk-off RBI single in the tenth inning versus the Mariners to score Jose Altuve (3−2).

Over 77 August at bats, Alvarez produced a slugging percentage of .312. Inflammation of the left hand kept Alvarez sidelined for five consecutive games until returning to the lineup on September 4. He reached base four times versus the Angels on September 11, including his first home run in 88 plate appearances. On September 16, Alvarez led the Astros to a 5–0 victory over the Oakland A's with a 4-hit performance, including three home runs in consecutive at bats off starter Adrián Martínez. One each was hit in the first, third and fifth innings versus Martínez, making Alvarez the first Astro to hit three off one pitcher in the same game. The 15th such game in franchise history, he became the third Astro to have hit two or more 3-HR games and first since Jeff Bagwell (two in 1999—3 total) and Glenn Davis (2). The win also clinched a playoff berth for the Astros for a sixth consecutive season. Alvarez earned the AL Player of the Week Award for the week ended September 18. He totaled a .520 average (13-for-25), .556 OBP, 1.280 slugging percentage, 10 runs scored, 10 RBI, four doubles, and five home runs.

In 2022, he batted .306/.406/.613, setting career-highs in home runs (37), runs scored (95), and bases on balls (78), and his slash line established career-bests. In left field, Alvarez played a career-high 56 games, ranking second in the AL at his position in assists (7). He produced a 187 adjusted OPS+, the second-highest in club history in a qualified season, trailing Bagwell's 213 OPS+ in the strike-shortened 1994 season. Following the regular season, the Houston chapter of the BBWAA recognized Alvarez as the Astros' team Most Valuable Player (MVP). He was one of seven nominees for the AL Hank Aaron Award.

On three occasions during the Astros' 2022 postseason run, Alvarez hit a home run in the sixth inning or later while his team was trailing that gave them the lead. No other player had previously hit such a home run during postseason play more than once during their entire career. In Game 1 of the Division Series, Alvarez hit a three-run walk-off home run for an 8–7 triumph over the Mariners, the final of his three hits and five RBIs that day. It was the first walk-off home run in an MLB postseason contest with the home team down to their final out in the ninth inning and trailing by more than one run, With the Astros trailing 4–0 in the third inning, Alvarez doubled home two runs, and, in the fourth inning, rifled a throw home to home plate that put out Ty France and prevented a run from scoring. (Note: Among postseason games, Alvarez's walk-off home run surpassed Kirk Gibson's walk-off home run during the 1988 World Series for highest win probability added on one play in the postseason (91% to 87%).) Offensively, Alvarez' 1.054 win probability added (WPA, 105.4f%) surpassed David Freese's 2011 World Series walk-off home run game for highest ever in an MLB postseason contest. Two days later, he hit a home run in the sixth inning to turn a 2–1 deficit into a 3–2 lead, which helped the Astros in a 4–2 victory as Alvarez became the second player with go-ahead home runs in the 6th inning or later of consecutive postseason games. Alvarez did not hit another home run for the rest of the series or the ALCS; however, the Astros won in four games, as he hit .214 with one RBI. In the World Series, he was kept off the basepaths for the most part, batting .130. However, he had an RBI in each of the four Astro victories. He had an RBI double to make it 2–0 in Game 2, was hit by a pitch with the bases loaded in Game 4, and hit a groundball to first to drive a runner home from third in Game 5. In the sixth inning of Game 6, with two runners on, he hit a 450-foot home run (his first in 23 days) to center field to make it a 3–1 game. The Astros won the game 4–1 to win their second World Series title in franchise history. Alvarez finished third in the regular-season AL MVP voting, behind only Aaron Judge and Shohei Ohtani.

==== 2023 ====
During a game against the Detroit Tigers on April 3, 2023, Alvarez hit his 100th career home run in his 372nd game, which set the franchise record for reaching 100 home runs in the fewest games, and was the fifth-fastest in major league history. (Note: Prior to Alvarez, only Ryan Howard, Judge, Gary Sánchez, and Pete Alonso had reached the milestone faster.) Previously, Lance Berkman held the club record, reaching 100 home runs in 452 games. Alvarez was the 19th player in team history to reach 100 home runs. Alvarez reached base in 40 consecutive games, a streak that spanned from the close of the 2022 season to May 17, 2023, including a then-career-high 13-game hitting streak. Per an OptaSTATS tweet on July 31, "one of the most accurate predictors of the Houston Astros' success appears to be Yordan Alvarez' ability to get on base." The Astros reached a highest-all-time record of 170–48 (.780 winning percentage) in games in which Alvarez reached base at least twice following a 17–4 win over Tampa Bay. (Note: Minimum 200 games in the modern era; qualification of a team's winning percentage was based on a single player in such games. The previous highest-winning percentage was connected to New York Yankees first baseman Joe Collins, who went 210–63 when he reached base multiple times from 1948 to 1957. Collins won six World Series championships.) Alvarez was 3-for-5 with a home run.

A right oblique strain that occurred on June 8 caused Alvarez to miss 39 games. He was reactivated from the injured list on July 26. During his stay on the injured list, Alvarez was named to the American League All-Star team for a second consecutive season. Alvarez reached base in 30 consecutive games, starting August 20 and through the first 17 games of September, for the longest in-season streak of his career. On September 24 versus Kansas City, he hit his 30th home run, which marked a third consecutive 30-home run season to join Bagwell (9), Berkman (5), and Glenn Davis (3) as the fourth player to have hit 30+ home runs in three or more years with the Astros. Alvarez hit .294/.441/.620, eight home runs, 20 RBI, walked 19 times, reached base in 26 of 27 games, led AL hitters in slugging percentage, and ranked second in OPS (1.061), on the way to being named AL Player of the Month for the second time.

Over the 2023 season, Alvarez appeared in 114 games and accrued 496 plate appearances, batting .293/.407/.583/.990 for a 170 OPS+, with 77 runs scored, 31 home runs, and 97 RBI. He ranked eighth in the league in both home runs and RBI, and was first in both win probability added (WPA, 4.7) and championship WPA (4.8). With hitless plate appearances added, he ranked eighth in the AL in batting, and third in each of on-base percentage, slugging percentage, OPS, and at-bats per home run (13.2). He appeared in 40 games at left field and 73 as designated hitter.

In Game 1 of the ALDS, Alvarez hit two home runs for his first multi-home run game in the postseason, and scored three runs to lead a 6–4 win over the Minnesota Twins. In Game 2, Alvarez would hit another home run, driving in the only runs in an eventual 6–2 loss for the Astros. In Game 3, Alvarez hit yet another home run, his fourth in three postseason games as the Astros won, 9–1. He was 6-for-12 with six RBI and 20 total bases in the three LDS games. Per OptaSTATs, Alvarez joined Reggie Jackson as the only players in history to hit at least four home runs and six extra-base hits within a three-game span of a postseason. Despite falling to the Rangers in 7 games, Alvarez continued to produce in the ALCS, batting .481 with two home runs, 9 RBIs, and posting a 1.309 OPS.

==== 2024 ====
Alvarez was named the starting designated hitter for the American League All-Star team for the first time in his career and his third straight selection. Alvarez drew a walk against Max Fried in his only plate appearance during the game as the American League won, 5–3.

On July 21, 2024, Alvarez hit a double in the eighth inning to complete the cycle in a 6–4 loss to the Mariners. He joined teammate Jose Altuve, who hit for the cycle the season prior, as the most recent Astros to complete the feat, and 11th in club history. Alvarez hit his 150th career home run on August 6, reaching the mark in 590 games, which eclipsed the franchise record by 133 games previously held by former teammate George Springer. Alvarez also became the eighth-fastest in major league history to hit 150. Along with Bregman, Alvarez was named AL co-Player of the Week for the week ended August 11 as they combined to lead the Astros to 5 wins in 6 games; Alvarez hit .421 with a 1.777 OPS, 5 home runs, 8 RBI, and 7 BB. It was the second time in club history with co-Players of the Week; on September 10, 2000, Richard Hidalgo and Julio Lugo shared the honors.

On August 28, Alvarez hit three home runs in three straight at-bats, his third career 3-homer game, and drove in four runs helping the Astros defeat the Phillies 10–0. Alvarez reached base in all five of his plate appearances in the game. With the feat, Alvarez also tied Hall of Fame slugger Jeff Bagwell for the most 3-homer games in Astros franchise history. On September 1, Alvarez reached 30 home runs for a fourth consecutive season, joining Bagwell (8 total, from 1996–2003) as the only Astros to have done so.

Over the regular season, Alvarez batted .308/.392/.567/.959 over 147 games with 35 home runs and 86 RBI. The 147 games played represented a career-high, as were his 635 plate appearances, 170 hits, and 313 total bases. Among qualified American League batters, Alvarez ranked fourth in each of batting, on-base percentage, slugging, OPS, situational wins added (5.4), and championship WPA (2.1). He ranked third in OPS+ (172), 5th in adjusted batting wins (5.4), 6th in runs created (124), 7th in doubles (34), home runs, and times on base (249), and 8th in total bases, extra-base hits (71), and bases on balls (69). He also led the club in numerous offensive categories, including in batting, on-base percentage, slugging percentage, doubles, home runs, RBI, bases on balls, and total bases. Alvarez was voted by the Houston chapter of the BBWAA as the Astros 2024 MVP, selected for the fifth time to the All-MLB Team, on the Second Team, and ranked ninth in the AL MVP voting.

==== 2025 ====
Due to lingering right hand inflammation, on May 5, 2025, the Astros placed Alvarez on the 10-day injured list (IL). An MRI showed a small muscle strain. The hand was not responding properly to rest and workouts, and on May 30, another MRI revealed a small fracture in the fourth metacarpal. On July 1, it was announced that Alvarez had been shut down after suffering renewed soreness during his rehabilitation; he was transferred to the 60-day injured list the next day. Alvarez was activated from the injured list on August 26. In 48 appearances for Houston on the year, he batted .273/.367/.430 with six home runs and 27 RBI. In a game against the Texas Rangers on September 15, Alvarez suffered a 'pretty significant' ankle sprain while scoring a run. He was placed on the injured list on September 19, and missed the remainder of the season.

==== 2026 ====
Over 32 games to open the 2026 season, Alvarez slashed .356/.462/.737/1.360 with 12 home runs, 27 RBI, and 87 total bases and was recognized as AL Player of the Month for the third time. On June 12, he connected for two home runs—the second being a grand slam—and six RBI during the first inning at Kauffman Stadium, becoming the 24th major leaguer to accrue six or more RBI during one inning. He tied a major league record as the 66th player to hit two home runs in an inning, and third Astro to do so. (Note: Succeeded Lee May on April 29, 1974, and Jeff Bagwell on June 24, 1994.) On June 30, Alvarez tied another major league record by becoming the 11th batter to hit three grand slams during one calendar month, (Note: Most recently accomplished by teammate Alex Bregman in June 2023.) connecting off Joe Ryan of the Minnesota Twins during the fourth inning of a 6–4 win. On July 4, Alvarez hit his second regular season walk-off home run, and first in exactly four seasons, leading a 10–8 comeback triumph over the Tampa Bay Rays. It was his fourth career game in which he had two home runs and at least six RBI, and his second such game of the season. (Note: Previously on August 10, 2019; September 6, 2024; and June 12, 2026.) Àlvarez received his fourth career selection to the MLB All-Star Game, his second as the starting DH, and, recorded his first All-Star hit and scored as the American League won, 4–0.

On July 10, 2026, Alvarez hit the 200th home run of his career, also his 30th of the season, 455 feet (139 m) to right-center field off Cal Quantrill at Texas, becoming the first player in the American League to hit 30. (Note: This was the second-fewest (96 games) for a player to reach 30 home runs in a season in team history, trailing only Jeff Bagwell in 1999.) On September 17, he homered off Seth Lugo for his 40th to become the fifth Astros batter to reach the milestone in a single season. (Note: Previously, Jeff Bagwell (1997, 1999, and 2000), Richard Hidalgo (2000), Lance Berkman (2002 and 2006), and Alex Bregman (2019). Number of seasons player meets criteria, playing for HOU, in the regular season, requiring home runs ≥ 40, sorted by descending instances.) Alvarez led the major leagues with a .316 batting average to become Houston's third batting champion. (Note: Succeeded Jose Altuve (2014, 2016, and 2017), and Yuli Gurriel (2021).) Moreover, Alvarez played in a career-high 158 games, and also led the major leagues in on-base percentage (.432), slugging percentage (.601), OPS (1.033), bases on balls (109), and intentional walks (33). He led the AL in total bases (340), ranked second in home runs (42) and RBI (106), and fourth in runs scored (105) and doubles (34). He became the 26th major leaguer to bat .300, score 100 runs, hit 30 doubles, 40 home runs, 100 RBI, and draw 100 walks, each within the same season. (Note: Also became second Astro following Jeff Bagwell (1999 and 2000). Criteria: Number of seasons player meets criteria, in the regular season, requiring Doubles ≥ 30 and Home Runs ≥ 40 and Runs Batted In ≥ 100 and Batting Average ≥ .300 and Runs ≥ 100 and Bases on Balls ≥ 100, sorted by descending instances.) For the third time, Alvarez was conferred Astros' team MVP honors.

On November 2, Alvarez was named a finalist for the American League Most Valuable Player Award alongside Junior Caminero and Bobby Witt Jr. On November 5, he was named the finalist for the Silver Slugger Award in the American League for the Designated Hitter. On November 11, Alvarez won the Hank Aaron award along side the National League winner Pete Crow-Armstrong. On November 12, Alvarez won the Most Valuable Player Award for the first time in his career in the American League, doing so unanimously. He became the 30th player to have won the Rookie of the Year and MVP awards for a career.

== Personal life ==
Alvarez's parents are Agustín Eduardo Alvarez Salazar and Mailyn Cadogan Reyes. He also has a brother, Yonder Alvarez Cadogan. It was during a contest at Minute Maid Park versus the Minnesota Twins on August 23, 2022, that his family first saw him play professionally since leaving Cuba. Alvarez is married. His wife, Monica Quiros Alvarez, also Cuban, is from Camagüey. The couple met prior to Alvarez' defection from Cuba and now reside in Houston. They have two children: daughter Mia, born on November 6, 2018, and son, Yordan Jr., was born on July 2, 2021.

Alvarez is Afro-Cuban. Naturally right-handed, he attempted to learn to switch-hit as a child before eventually realizing he was stronger on the left side.

== Awards ==
Awards won by Yordan Álvarez
Award	Category	Result / Section	No.	Year	Ref.
All-Star Futures Game selection			2	2017, 2018	
ALCS MVP			1	2021	
Edgar Martínez Award			1	2026	
American League (AL)	Player of the Month		3	June 2022; September 2023; April 2026	
American League (AL)	Player of the Week		6	2× 2022 (Note: June 6 and September 18); August 12, 2024; 3× 2026 (Note: April 5, June 7, and July 5)	
Houston Astros	Most Valuable Player (MVP)		3	2022, 2024, 2026	
Houston Astros	Rookie of the Year		1	2019	
Players Choice	AL Outstanding Rookie		1	2019	

== See also ==
- Houston Astros award winners and league leaders
- List of baseball players who defected from Cuba
- List of Major League Baseball career OPS leaders
- List of Major League Baseball career slugging percentage leaders
- List of Major League Baseball players from Cuba
- List of Major League Baseball single-inning home run leaders
- List of Major League Baseball single-inning runs batted in leaders
- List of walk-off home runs in the postseason and All-Star Game

== Notes ==
Awards and achievements
Preceded by Aaron Judge; Julio Rodríguez; Aaron Judge; Junior Caminero	American League Player of the Month; June 2022; September 2023; April 2026; July 2026	Succeeded by Aaron Judge; Gunnar Henderson; Nick Kurtz; Jac Caglianone
Preceded by Eloy Jiménez	American League Rookie of the Month; June–August 2019	Succeeded by Michael Chavis
Preceded by Wyatt Langford	Hitting for the cycle July 21, 2024	Succeeded by Xavier Edwards
