= 2023 Houston Astros season =

62nd season in Major League Baseball for the Houston Astros

2023 Houston Astros
- American League West champions
- League: American League
- Division: West
- Ballpark: Minute Maid Park
- City: Houston, Texas
- Record: 90–72 (.556)
- Divisional place: 1st
- Owners: Jim Crane
- General managers: Dana Brown
- Managers: Dusty Baker
- Television: AT&T SportsNet Southwest (Todd Kalas, Kevin Eschenfelder, Geoff Blum, Mike Stanton)
- Radio: KTRH 740 Weekday Night Games Sportstalk 790; Houston Astros Radio Network (Robert Ford, Steve Sparks, Geoff Blum); KLAT (Spanish) (Francisco Romero, Alex Treviño)
- Stats: ESPN.com; Baseball Reference

The 2023 Houston Astros season was the 62nd season for the Major League Baseball (MLB) franchise located in Houston, Texas, their 59th as the Astros, 11th in both the American League (AL) and AL West division, and 24th at Minute Maid Park. They entered the season as defending World Series champions, their second title, as well both the two-time defending AL and AL West champions. Further, they had qualified as entrants into six consecutive American League Championship Series (ALCS), a continuation of the longest streak in franchise history.

On April 3, 2023, Yordan Alvarez hit his 100th career home run in his 372nd game, setting the record for fewest in franchise history, and the fifth fastest in major league history. Jose Altuve reached a number of career milestones, including 1,000 runs scored (June 13, 2023), 35 four-hit games (June 17), 200 home runs (August 5), and 2,000 hits (August 19). (Note: Altuve set Astros clubs records for both career 4-hit games and fewest games to reach 2,000 hits (1,631).) Closer Ryan Pressly became the fourth pitcher to convert 100 saves as a member of the Astros on July 25. The Astros reacquired Kendall Graveman and Justin Verlander at the trade deadline, mirroring moves they have made for both players in previous postseason runs. On the day of the trade for Verlander—August 1—Framber Valdez no-hit the Cleveland Guardians to become the first left-handed pitcher in franchise history to deliver such a feat. Valdez's no-hitter was the 16th no-hitter in franchise history.

The Astros passed 3 million fans in attendance for the fifth time in franchise history; however, they were defeated in 17 of their final 23 home games (.261 winning percentage) to produce their first losing season at home (38–42 (.475)) since 2014, when they went 70–92 (.432) overall. The club drew an average home attendance of 37,683 over 81 contests, ranking seventh-highest in the league.

On September 30, the Astros clinched a playoff berth for the seventh consecutive year and the eighth time in nine seasons with a 1–0 shutout win against the Arizona Diamondbacks; they became the fourth team in MLB history to reach the postseason in seven consecutive seasons, a continuation of the most successful era in franchise history.

On October 1, the Astros clinched the AL West title for the third consecutive year and the sixth time in the last seven seasons with an 8–1 win against Arizona, and the second seed in AL postseason play. (Note: The Astros finished with identical records of 90–72 with the Texas Rangers but owned the head-to-head tiebreaker to claim the division, qualify as the league's second seed, and thus a bye from the American League Wild Card Series, forcing the Rangers to play in the Wild Card series as the fifth seed against the Tampa Bay Rays.) They beat the Minnesota Twins in four games in the American League Division Series to reach the American League Championship Series for the seventh consecutive season, a continued American League record in LCS appearance streak. The Astros failed to defend their title as they lost to the eventual World Series champion and division rival Texas Rangers in seven games, their first Lone Star Series rivalry matchup in the postseason.

Alvarez, Kyle Tucker, and Valdez were each named to the MLB All-Star Game as reserve players, while Dusty Baker was manager for the American League. In the MLB draft, Houston selected Brice Matthews, a shortstop from the University of Nebraska, at #28 overall in the first round for their top pick. Tucker led the AL in runs batted in (RBI, 112), was named Astros' team Most Valuable Player (MVP) and won his first career Silver Slugger Award, while Mauricio Dubón earned the first Gold Glove Award of his career. Valdez was named the Astros' Pitcher of the Year, while catcher Yainer Díaz was team Rookie of the Year.

== Offseason ==
=== November–December 2022 ===
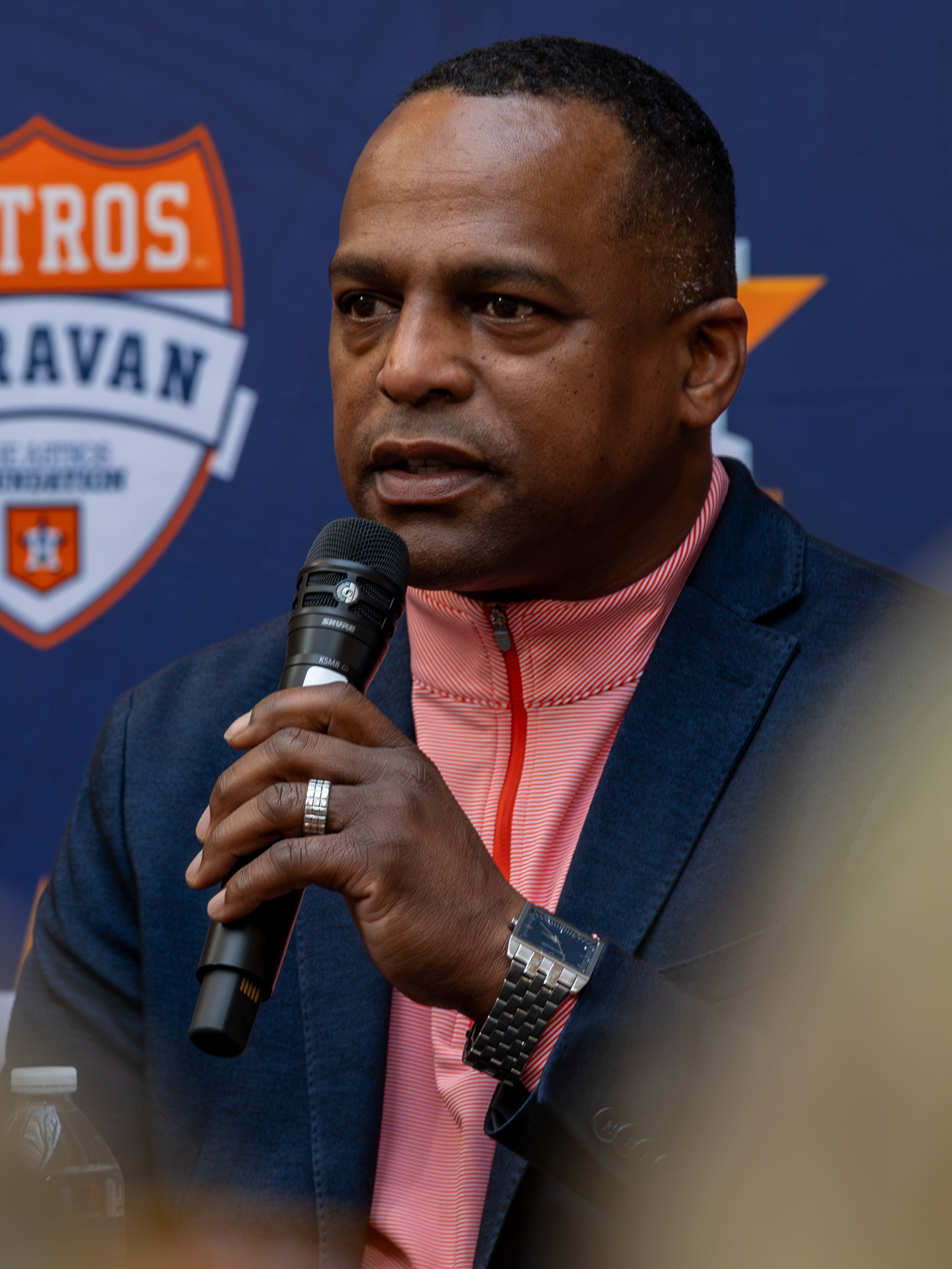
The Astros hired Dana Brown as general manager, succeeding James Click.

The Houston Astros finished the 2022 season as World Series champions, their second title overall, and first since 2017. Their 106 regular-season wins represented the second-highest total in franchise history, to the 2019 club, and the fifth 100-win season in team history. They clinched their fifth AL West division title, and 13th overall, and fifth league pennant, including four AL pennants. Further, their entrance into the 2022 American League Championship Series (ALCS) was their sixth consecutive, representing the longest streak for an AL club. It trailed only the Atlanta Braves, who played eight consecutive National League Championship Series (1991–1999) for most consecutive League Championship Series (LCS) played.

On November 8, 2022, it was announced that manager Dusty Baker would be back for the 2023 season as Astros manager.

On November 11, 2022, it was announced that general manager (GM) James Click would not be returning to the Astros for the 2023 season. The following day, assistant GM Scott Powers was fired. Click had hired Powers from the Los Angeles Dodgers' front office in January 2022. Charles Cook and Bill Firkus were both promoted to assistant GM following the World Series. While the club operated without an officially-titled GM, club owner Jim Crane became active in the role, including directly negotiating with free agents. Cook, Firkus, and co-assistant GM Andrew Ball each assumed increased responsibilities.

The Astros signed hitting coach Alex Cintrón to an extension to run through the 2025 season on November 21, 2022. Having interviewed for the Toronto Blue Jays' bench coach position, the Astros re-signed him before the Blue Jays finalized their decision.

On November 28, 2022, the Astros signed 1st baseman José Abreu to a three-year, $58.5 million contract.

Catcher Jason Castro announced his retirement from playing on December 2, 2022. The Astros' first-round selection and number 10 overall in the 2008 MLB draft from Stanford University, Castro spent nine of 12 major league seasons in Houston, earning an All-Star selection in 2013 while starring on teams that lost 107, 111, and 92 games during the club's period of rebuilding. Although injury in 2022 precluded him from playing in the Astros' championship run, he earned his first World Series ring. Upon retirement, Castro ranked as the Astros' career leader among catchers in home runs (71), and his 717 games at the position ranked third behind Alan Ashby and Brad Ausmus.

On December 21, 2022, the Astros re-signed outfielder Michael Brantley to a 1-year, $12 million contract

=== January–February 2023 ===
Former broadcaster Bill Brown and infielder Bill Doran were announced on January 21, 2023, as inductees to the Houston Astros Hall of Fame with an induction ceremony prior to a contest on August 12 versus on the Los Angeles Angels. The announcement came during the annual Astros FanFest, held at Minute Maid Park. It was the first Astros FanFest since 2020, prior to the onset of the COVID-19 pandemic, which led to cancellation of the following two annual events.

On January 26, 2023, the Astros named Dana Brown as their next general manager, hiring him from the position as the Atlanta Braves' vice president of scouting.

On February 10, 2023, the Astros announced that they extended pitcher Cristian Javier for 5 years & $64 million.

=== Transactions ===
Free agents

==== Free agents ====
Major League free agents

Following 2022 World Series
| Michael Brantley (LF) | Astros electing free agency November 6, 2022 Contracts expired after World Series | Re-signed with Houston Astros 1 year, $12 million December 21, 2022 |
| Jason Castro (C) | Astros electing free agency November 6, 2022 Contracts expired after World Series | Retired Announced retirement December 2, 2022 |
| Aledmys Díaz (UT) | Astros electing free agency November 6, 2022 Contracts expired after World Series | Signed with Oakland Athletics 2 years, $14.5 million December 13, 2022 |
| Yuli Gurriel (1B) | Astros electing free agency November 6, 2022 Contracts expired after World Series | Signed with Miami Marlins Minor league contract |
| Rafael Montero (RHP) | Astros electing free agency November 6, 2022 Contracts expired after World Series | Re-signed with Houston Astros 3 years, $34.5 million November 12, 2022 |
| Christian Vázquez (C) | Astros electing free agency November 6, 2022 Contracts expired after World Series | Signed with Minnesota Twins 3 years, $30 million December 16, 2022 |
Player option held
| Justin Verlander (SP) | Astros becoming free agents following options decisions November 10, 2022 Player declined option for 2023 | Signed with New York Mets 2 years, $86.66 million December 7, 2022 Vesting option for 2025 |
Club options held
| Trey Mancini (1B/LF) | Astros becoming free agents following options decisions November 9, 2022 Team declined options for 2023 | Signed with Chicago Cubs 2 years, $14 million January 20, 2023 |
| Will Smith (LHP) | Astros becoming free agents following options decisions November 9, 2022 Team declined options for 2023 | Signed with Texas Rangers 1 year, $1.5 million March 4, 2023 |
Incoming free agents
| José Abreu (1B) | Departed Chicago White Sox November 6, 2022 Contract expired | Signed with Houston Astros November 28, 2022 3 years, $58.5 million |
Non-tendered
| Josh James (RHP) | Arbitration-eligible group November 18, 2022 Non-tendered by team | Current free agent |

Minor league free agents

| Austin Davis (LHP) | Departed Minnesota Twins | Signed November 16, 2022 |
| Dixon Machado (SS) | Departed San Francisco Giants | Signed November 22, 2022 |
| Ty Buttrey (RHP) | Departed Los Angeles Angels | Signed January 31, 2023 |
| Bryan Garcia (RHP) | Departed Detroit Tigers | Signed February 7, 2023 |
| Jon Singleton (1B) | Departed Milwaukee Brewers | Signed June 24, 2023 |

Arbitration-phase players

==== Arbitration-phase players ====
Arbitration-eligible players
| Player | Pos. | Tendered | Hearing | Agreed | Salary | Arb. year | Free agent | Ref. |
|---|---|---|---|---|---|---|---|---|
| Phil Maton | RHP | November 18, 2022 | No | January 13, 2023 | $2,550,000 | 3 | 2024 | |
| Ryne Stanek | RHP | November 18, 2022 | No | January 13, 2023 | $3,600,000 | 3 | 2024 | |
| Framber Valdez | LHP | November 18, 2022 | No | January 13, 2023 | $6,800,000 | 2 | 2026 | |
| Cristian Javier | RHP | November 18, 2022 | No | February 10, 2023 (Note: Agreed to a 5-year extension that bought out 3 remaining arbitration years and 2 free agency years.) | $64,000,000 | 1 | 2028 | |
| José Urquidy | RHP | November 18, 2022 | No | January 13, 2023 | $3,025,000 | 1 | 2026 | |
| Blake Taylor | LHP | November 18, 2022 | No | January 13, 2023 | $830,000 | 1 | 2026 | |
| Kyle Tucker | RF | November 18, 2022 | Yes | February 9, 2023 | $5,000,000 | 1 | 2026 | |
| Mauricio Dubón ^{†} | UT | November 18, 2022 | No | January 13, 2023 | $1,400,000 | 1 | 2027 | |
| Josh James | RHP | Non-tendered | Declared free agent | | | | 2023 | |
^{†}—Super Two player (description:) Also:

Trades

Trades
| July 28, 2023 | To Houston Astros Kendall Graveman (RHP) | To Chicago White Sox Korey Lee (C) |

40-man roster

==== 40-man roster ====
| November 15, 2022 | Added — ahead of deadline for eligibility for protection from Rule 5 draft: Pitcher J. P. France (right-hander) |
| December 2, 2022 | Claimed off waivers: Infielder Rylan Bannon |
| January 3, 2023 | Acquired in trade: Outfielder/1st Baseman Bligh Madris |
| February 13, 2023 | Claimed off waivers: Pitcher Matt Gage |

Injury report

==== Injury report ====
Injury report
| Player | Role | Injury type | Start | Completion | Notes | Ref. |
|---|---|---|---|---|---|---|
| Michael Brantley | Pos. | Shoulder labrum tear (right) | June 27, 2022 | TBA | (Note: Target return date unknown.) | |
| Lance McCullers Jr. | Pit. | Arm muscle strain (right) | March 1, 2023 | TBA | | |
| Parker Mushinski | Pit. | Lumbar muscle spasms | March 1, 2023 | May 22, 2023 | | |
| Jose Altuve | Pos. | Thumb fracture (left) | March 19, 2023 | May 19, 2023 | | |
| José Urquidy | Pit. | Shoulder inflammation (right) | April 30, 2023 | August 6, 2023 | | |
| Luis García | Pit. | UCL reconstruction (right) | May 1, 2023 | TBA | (Note: Will miss remainder of 2023 season and expected to miss start of 2024 season.) | |
| Shawn Dubin | Pit. | Elbow strain (right) | May 6, 2023 | TBA | | |
| Forrest Whitley | Pit. | Latissimus dorsi strain | June 2, 2023 | TBA | (Note: Projected to miss 3–4 months.) | |
| Yordan Alvarez | Pos. | Oblique muscle (right) | June 9, 2023 | July 26, 2023 | Missed 39 games | |
| Jose Altuve | Pos. | Oblique injury | July 3, 2023 | July 26, 2023 | Missed 16 games | |
| Phil Maton | Pit. | Elbow injury (right) | August 12, 2023 | TBA | 15-day injured list | |
| José Abreu | Pos. | Lower back discomfort | August 12, 2023 | TBA | 10-day injured list | |

== Spring training ==
The Astros played their first Spring Training game on February 25, 2022, versus the New York Mets, and ended preseason activities on March 28 versus the Triple-A affiliate Sugar Land Space Cowboys. On March 8, the Astros hosted Team Venezuela, a participant in the World Baseball Classic.

The club finished third overall in Grapefruit League play with a 14–10 record. They scored 140 runs while allowing 97; their +43 run differential led all MLB teams in spring training.

For their final Opening Day roster spots, the Astros selected reliever Ronel Blanco, catcher Yainer Díaz, outfielder Corey Julks, reliever Seth Martinez, and catcher César Salazar. Julks and Salazar were selected to an MLB roster for the first time in their careers, positioning them for their major league debuts. Díaz and Martinez made the MLB Opening Day roster for the first time in their careers.

Spring Training non-roster invitees

| Player | Position | 2022 organization | Ref. |
|---|---|---|---|
| 91 • Ross Adolph | OF | Houston Astros | |
| 78 • Luke Berryhill | C | Houston Astros | |
| 51 • Ty Buttrey | RHP | Los Angeles Angels | |
| 76 • Devin Conn | RHP | Houston Astros | |
| 83 • Marty Costes | OF | Houston Astros | |
| 39 • Austin Davis | LHP | Minnesota Twins | |
| 84 • Justin Dirden | OF | Houston Astros | |
| 86 • Jimmy Endersby | RHP | Houston Astros | |
| 35 • Bryan Garcia | RHP | Detroit Tigers | |
| 74 • Austin Hansen | RHP | ↑ | |
| 87 • Corey Julks | OF | Houston Astros | |
| 81 • Grae Kessinger | INF | Houston Astros | |
| 28 • Dixon Machado | INF | San Francisco Giants | |
| — • Jaime Melendez | RHP | Houston Astros | |
| 72 • Jayden Murray | RHP | Houston Astros | |
| 71 • Joe Record | RHP | Houston Astros | |
| 70 • Matt Ruppenthal | RHP | Houston Astros | |
| 89 • César Salazar | C | Houston Astros | |
| 80 • C. J. Stubbs | C | Houston Astros | |
↑—Did not play. Reference:

=== World Baseball Classic ===
The following Astros represented their respective countries at the 2023 World Baseball Classic (WBC):

Houston Astros in the 2023 WBC
| Individual | Role | National team | Achievements | | Stats |
|---|---|---|---|---|---|
| Michael Collins | Coach | Australia | | | |
| Bryan Abreu | Pitcher | Dominican Republic | 9.00 ERA, 2 IP, 4 H, 2 SO | | |
| Cristian Javier | Pitcher | Dominican Republic | 1–0 W–L, 4 IP, 0.00 ERA (Note: Tied for 1st in WBC play.) | | |
| Rafael Montero | Pitcher | Dominican Republic | 2 G, 0.00 ERA, 2 IP, 0 H, 0 R | | |
| Héctor Neris | Pitcher | Dominican Republic | 3 G, 0.00 ERA, 2 1/3 IP, 0 H, 4 SO | | |
| Jeremy Peña | Shortstop | Dominican Republic | 1-for-6 (.167/.375/.333) | | |
| José Urquidy | Pitcher | Mexico | (bronze) (Note: Defeated by Japan, 6–5, in semifinal round.) | 1–0 W–L, 4.26 ERA, 6 1/3 IP | |
| Martín Maldonado | Catcher | Puerto Rico | Caught unofficial perfect game vs Israel | | |
| Ryan Pressly | Pitcher | United States | (silver) (Note: Defeated by Japan, 3–2, in championship game.) | 3 G, 3 IP, 0.00 ERA, 2 SV | |
| Kyle Tucker | Outfielder | United States | (silver) | 5-for-15 (.333/.353/.733), 1 2B, 1 3B, 1 HR | |
| Jose Altuve | Second baseman | Venezuela | Won Pool D (4–0) (Note: Defeated by United States, 9–7, in quarterfinal round.) | 3-for-14 (.214/.450/.286), 4 runs, 5 BB, 5 SO | |
| Luis García | Pitcher | Venezuela | Won Pool D (4–0) | 7 IP, 2.57 ERA, 10 SO | |
| Omar López | Manager | Venezuela | Won Pool D (4–0) | 1st assignment as Team Venezuela's manager | |

| Friendly | March 8 | Venezuela | 9–8 | Houston Astros | Cacti Park of the Palm Beaches, West Palm Beach, Florida |
| Friendly | 18:05 EST | WP: Carlos Hernández (1–0); HR: Salvador Perez (1) | Boxscore | LP: Jayden Murray (0–1) | Attendance: 4,698; Umpires: HP – Sam Burch; 1B – Ron Kulpa; 2B – Carlos Torres; 3B – Maikol Tibbijo |

During the first round, Team Puerto Rico combined to pitch eight perfect innings before the game ended 10–0 when Maldonado scored on a walk-off hit in the bottom of the eighth inning that invoked the tournament's mercy rule. Due to lasting fewer than nine innings, it did not qualify as an official perfect game, per the Elias Sports Bureau (ESB). José De León, Yacksel Ríos, Edwin Díaz, and Duane Underwood Jr. all pitched for Puerto Rico.

In Venezuela's quarterfinals loss to the United States, Altuve sustained a left thumb fracture from an errant Daniel Bard pitch. Altuve underwent surgery and was expected to miss the first two months of the regular season.

== Regular season ==
=== Summary ===
For the first time, MLB scheduled each team in the league to play every other team in the league during the regular season, resulting in Houston facing National League (NL) teams 46 times, compared to 20 times under prior scheduling.

2023 regular season format
| No. | League | Group | Teams | Total |
|---|---|---|---|---|
| 13 | AL West | 4 | Mariners, Angels, Rangers, Athletics | 52 |
| 7 | AL | 4 | White Sox, Blue Jays, Yankees, Red Sox | 28 |
| 6 | AL | 6 | Twins, Rays, Guardians, Tigers, Royals, Orioles | 36 |
| 4 | NL | 1 | Rockies | 4 |
| 3 | NL | 14 | All other NL teams | 42 |
| **Total** | | | | 162 |

==== March—April ====
Opening Series, March 30 – April 2 vs Chicago White Sox: HOU split series, 2–2

Opening Day starting lineup
| Uniform | Player | Position | Starts |
|---|---|---|---|
| 3 | Jeremy Peña | Shortstop | 2 |
| 2 | Alex Bregman | Third baseman | 7 |
| 44 | Yordan Alvarez | Left fielder | 3 |
| 79 | José Abreu | First baseman | 1 |
| 30 | Kyle Tucker | Right fielder | 3 |
| 21 | Yainer Díaz | Designated hitter | 1 |
| 6 | Jake Meyers | Center fielder | 1 |
| 15 | Martín Maldonado | Catcher | 4 |
| 14 | Mauricio Dubón | Second baseman | 1 |
| 59 | Framber Valdez | Pitcher | 2 |
Venue: Minute Maid Park • Final: Houston 6, Chicago (AL) 3 Sources:

Houston's Opening Day was played versus the Chicago White Sox on March 30, 2023, at Minute Maid Park, and the season concluded on October 1 versus the Arizona Diamondbacks.

The Astros opened the 2023 regular season at Minute Maid Park with festivities to honor the club's 2022 championship season, including presenting World Series rings to players, coaches, and all 2,000 team personnel. Houston's Framber Valdez pitched opposite of Chicago's Dylan Cease as their team's respective Opening Day starters. While both remained unscored upon while still on the mound, Cease was more dominant, striking out 10 en route to retiring 19 consecutive Astros hitters. Newcomer José Abreu singled in the sixth inning off Cease for his first base hit as an Astro. In the ninth inning, Andrew Vaughn hit a tie-breaking two-run double that led a 3–2 White Sox win. The loss ended 10 consecutive Opening Day wins for the Astros, which had tied a major league record. Previously, Houston had remained unbeaten on Opening Day since moving to the American League. For the first time since 2011, Jose Altuve was not present as Houston's Opening Day starting second baseman. The last player to start before Altuve was Bill Hall. In seventh inning of the second game, on March 31, Yordan Alvarez hit a bases-clearing double that represented the game-winning run in a 6–3 win. Preceding Alvarez' double was Kyle Tucker's first home run of the season, driving in two runs in the sixth. Corey Julks started as designated hitter and singled off Lance Lynn in his first major league at bat. On April 1, Tucker (go-ahead run batted in, RBI) and Alvarez (three hits, one RBI) again were key offensive contributors to win over Chicago, 6–4. Ronel Blanco made his season debut and threw two clutch scoreless innings in relief to keep the score tied, 3–3.

April 3–5 vs Detroit Tigers: DET won series, 2–1

During the series opener versus Detroit, Alvarez connected for his 100th career home run, becoming the fifth-fastest player (372 games) in major league history to accomplish the feat, following Ryan Howard, Aaron Judge, Gary Sánchez, and Pete Alonso. The Astros, who lost the first two games of the series, defeated the Tigers in the finale, 8–2. Chas McCormick, Tucker, and Peña each homered and starting pitcher Cristian Javier allowed five hits and one run over six innings to earn his first win of the season.

April 7–9 at Minnesota Twins: MIN won series, 2–1

In the Astros' first road game of the season, Twins starter Sonny Gray struck out a career-high 13, the first of 16 total by Astros hitters. In the bottom of the tenth inning, reliever Ryne Stanek (1–1) lost control with two walks and two wild pitches, setting up Kyle Farmer's walk-off single that produced a 3–2 Twins victory. In the second game of the series, the Astros struck out another 17 times. Home runs by Alvarez (grand slam) and Peña provided all of Houston's scoring; however, Farmer, Christian Vázquez, and Byron Buxton each had key hits for the Twins as they held for a 9–6 win. In the finale, McCormick homered and drove in four while Hunter Brown (1–0) allowed two hits over a career-high seven innings on the way to lead a 5–1 Astros victory.

April 10–12 at Pittsburgh Pirates: HOU won series, 2–1

The Astros won their first contest of the season against an NL opponent, 8–2, at PNC Park behind three hits each from Yordan Alvarez (5 total times on base, 2 RBI) and Mauricio Dubón, and 3 walks, one hit, and 2 runs scored by Alex Bregman. Starter Framber Valdez (1–1) navigated three hits, one hit batsman and five walks to deliver 7 solid innings with both runs allowed. He struck out five and induced three double plays. The following game, closer Ryan Pressly surrendered a walk-off home run to Ji-hwan Bae in a 7–4 Pirates win. On April 12, 2023, Julks hit his first major league home run while facing Rich Hill, and Bregman also homered, fueling a 7–0 Astros win. Meanwhile José Urquidy earned his first win of the season with just two hits surrendered in six innings.

April 14–16 vs Texas Rangers • Lone Star Series • TEX won series, 2–1

The Astros returned to Minute Maid Park, and the Rangers arrived with new manager Bruce Bochy, who, like Dusty Baker, had previously managed the San Francisco Giants. Also rival managers with other National League clubs, entering the series, Baker was ninth in major league history for wins by managers (2,099), while Bochy was 11th (2,010). In the middle game, Yordan Alvarez drove in three runs and Hunter Brown (2–0) worked seven innings with two unearned runs and five strikeouts to lead Houston to an 8–2 win. In the finale, the Rangers took advantage of defensive miscues by the Astros that led to eight unearned runs and a 9–1 win, including six runs in the seventh inning highlighted by Marcus Semien's grand slam. César Salazar singled in the ninth inning as a pinch hitter for his first major league hit.

April 17–19 vs Toronto Blue Jays: HOU won series, 2–1

On April 18, Toronto starter Chris Bassitt (2–2) did not allow an Astros hit until the fourth inning on a two-out José Abreu single. José Urquidy (1–2) allowed home runs to Matt Chapman and Vladimir Guerrero Jr. In the series finale, Luis García (1–2) earned his first win of the season with nine strikeouts over seven innings. Jeremy Peña hit a three-run home run to highlight a six-run bottom of the eighth inning in an 8–1 final score.

April 21–23 at Atlanta Braves: HOU won series, 3–0

In a series featuring the two previous World Series champions, Yordan Alvarez hit a tie-breaking two-run home run in the ninth inning as Houston won the opener, 6–4. The Astros next won the middle game, 6–3, aided by a pair of two-run home runs in the sixth inning from Alvarez and Tucker. Starter Framber Valdez (2–2) collected his fourth straight quality start despite allowing eight hits and two home runs, getting the Braves lineup to go 0-for-5 with runners in scoring position. Cristian Javier worked six innings on April 23, allowing three hits and striking out 10. In the eighth inning, Alvarez delivered a game-tying two-single versus A. J. Minter (1–2) before Julks singled in the go-ahead run in the ninth inning on the way to a 5–2 win for the first Astros' sweep of the season.

April 24–26 at Tampa Bay Rays: HOU won series, 2–1

On April 24, the Rays defeated the Astros, 8–3, to set the modern-era record for wins to start the season at home with 14. Rookie Taj Bradley (3–0) won the third of his first three major league starts and shortstop Wander Franco had four hits and an impressive barehanded catch of a Martín Maldonado fly ball in foul territory. Behind six masterful shutout innings from starter Luis García (2–2), the Astros won the middle game of the series while halting the Rays' home winning streak. In the fifth inning, the Astros scored five runs powered by four doubles, leading to a 5–0 win. The Astros shut out the Rays for a second straight game, 1–0, behind seven dominant innings from Hunter Brown (3–0) and one inning apiece from Héctor Neris and Ryan Pressly. (Note: The last time Houston shut out Tampa Bay in consecutive games was September 19–20, 2022, at Tropicana Field.) Alex Bregman drove in the game's only run on a misplayed double play opportunity by Wander Franco in the first inning. Mauricio Dubon extended a hitting streak to 20 games in the fifth, the most by an Astro since Hunter Pence authored 23 straight in 2011.

April 28–30 vs Philadelphia Phillies: PHI won series, 2–1

In a 2022 World Series rematch, the Phillies started out strong, winning 3–1, recording eight hits, compared to the Astros 3 hits. Jeremy Peña and Kyle Schwarber both hit home runs, each hitting their respective home runs over 400 feet (Peña: 402 feet) (Schwarber: 407 feet). Aaron Nola (2–2) struck out 6, while only allowing 3 hits and 1 earned run, and recorded the win, with José Alvarado recording the save, his 5th of the season. Framber Valdez (2–3) took the loss, giving up 8 hits and 3 earned runs, while striking out 3. Game 2 was also taken by the Phillies, with them recording a 6–1 win. Zack Wheeler (3–1) recorded the win, striking out 7, over 6 shutout innings. Cristian Javier (2–1) took the loss, giving up 3 earned runs over 5.2 innings, while striking out 6. Nick Castellanos homered off Javier in the 4th inning, and Kody Clemens homered off Phil Maton in the 6th. Jeremy Peña scored the Astros’ lone run on an 8th inning homer off Andrew Vasquez. Game 3 was taken by Houston, in a 4–3 win to avoid being swept. José Urquidy (2–2) recorded the win, and Héctor Neris, Rafael Montero, and Bryan Abreu all recorded holds, with Ryan Pressly recording the save. Bailey Falter (0–5) took the loss for the Phillies, giving up 4 earned runs over 4.1 innings, including Jake Meyers’ 407 foot homer in the 4th inning. J. T. Realmuto and Kody Clemens both homered for the Phillies, and Kyle Schwarber scored on an Alex Bregman error, keeping the game close, but a 5th inning Kyle Tucker RBI single kept the Astros ahead for the win.

==== May ====
May 1–3 vs San Francisco Giants: SF won series, 2–1

Game 1 was taken by the Astros in a 7–3 win. Luis García started the game for Houston, but exited in the first inning with elbow discomfort. Brandon Bielak entered the game as the long reliever, striking out 6 over 4 innings, while giving up 2 runs. Ryne Stanek (2–1) recorded the win, pitching 1 scoreless inning in relief. Mauricio Dubón dominated in his “revenge game” recording 2 RBI and 2 runs scored on 3 hits against his former team. Sean Hjelle (1–1) took the loss for San Francisco, giving up 5 runs over 1 inning. Game 2 went to the Giants in a 2–0 Astros loss. Anthony DeSclafani (3–1) got the win for San Francisco, pitching 8 scoreless innings, striking out 3, allowing 3 hits and no runs. Camilo Doval got the save throwing a scoreless 9th. Hunter Brown (3–1) took the loss for Houston, pitching 4.1 innings, giving up 2 earned runs over 4 hits and 5 BB, while striking out 4. Left-hander Matt Gage made his Astros debut with 1 2/3 scoreless innings, allowing 2 hits and striking out 1. Game 3 went to the Giants, giving them the series win. Logan Webb (2–5) got the win for San Francisco, pitching 7.2 innings, while giving up 2 earned runs over 5 hits and 2 BB, and striking out 5. Scott Alexander was awarded a hold, throwing 0.1 innings and striking out the 1 batter he faced. Camilo Doval got the save for the Giants, throwing 1 scoreless inning with 1 BB and 1 strikeout. Framber Valdez (2–4) took the loss for Houston, pitching 6 innings, striking out 8, while allowing 2 runs on 5 hits and 2 BB. Alex Bregman scored both of the Astros’ runs on an 8th inning 2-run home run.

May 5–7 at Seattle Mariners: SEA won series 2–1

On May 5, 2023, it was announced by Astros General Manager Dana Brown that RHP Luis Garcia would be having a season-ending ulnar collateral ligament reconstruction (Tommy John surgery). Game 1 of the 2022 American League Division Series rematch series between the Astros and Mariners was taken by Houston in a 6–4 win. Cristian Javier started the game for Houston, pitching 7 innings, striking out 8, while allowing 3 runs on 3 hits and 2 BB. Bryan Abreu (1–0) recorded the win for the Astros, as well as a blown save, pitching 1 inning, striking out 2, while allowing 1 run on 3 hits. Ryan Pressly recorded his 4th save of the season, pitching a scoreless 9th inning, while allowing 2 hits. Luis Castillo started the game for Seattle, pitching 7 innings, striking out 5, while allowing 4 runs on 5 hits and 1 BB. Matt Brash (3–3) took the loss for the Mariners, pitching 0.2 innings, striking out 2, while allowing 2 runs on 2 hits and 1 BB. Yordan Alvarez and Kyle Tucker both hit home runs for Houston. Seattle took Game 2 in a 7–5 win. Marco Gonzales started the game for the Mariners, pitching 6 innings, striking out 4, while allowing 3 runs on 6 hits and 3 BB. Tayler Saucedo (1–0) recorded the win for Seattle, pitching 1 inning, striking out 2. J. P. France made his major league debut for the Astros, starting on the mound, and pitching 5 scoreless innings, striking out 5, while allowing 3 hits and 1 BB. Phil Maton and Héctor Neris both recorded holds for Houston, and Rafael Montero (0–1) took the loss for the Astros, pitching 0.2 innings, striking out 1, while allowing 4 runs on 3 hits and 1 BB. Ryne Stanek entered the game after Montero, pitching 0.1 innings, and allowing 3 runs on 4 hits to end the 8th inning. Following the game, many Astros fans took to Twitter to complain about the Mariners' 7-run 8th inning. Game 3 went to the Mariners in a 3–1 Seattle win. Bryce Miller (1–0) recorded the win for Seattle, the first of his career. Miller pitched 6 innings, striking out 5, while not allowing any runs on 2 hits and 1 BB. Gabe Speier, Matt Brash, and Trevor Gott all recorded holds for the Mariners, and Justin Topa recorded the save, pitching 1 scoreless inning with 1 strikeout. Brandon Bielak (0–1) took the loss for Houston, pitching 4.2 innings, allowing 3 runs on 10 hits and 2 BB. Kyle Tucker batted in the Astros' only run, with José Abreu scoring on Tucker's 7th-inning single. For the Mariners, Julio Rodríguez hit a solo home run and Eugenio Suárez scored on a José Abreu fielding error in the 3rd inning, and Jarred Kelenic scored on a bases-loaded balk by Matt Gage in the 5th inning.

May 8–10 at Los Angeles Angels: HOU won series 2–1

The Angels took Game 1 of the three-game series in a 6–4 Los Angeles win. Patrick Sandoval started the game for the Angels, pitching 6.1 innings, striking out 2, while allowing 4 runs on 7 hits, including a 5th-inning David Hensley solo home run. Matt Moore (2–1) recorded the win for the Angels, pitching 1.2 innings, striking out 1. Carlos Estévez recorded the save for Los Angeles, pitching 1 scoreless inning, striking out 1. Hunter Brown started the game for the Astros, pitching 4.1 innings, striking out 3, while allowing 4 runs on 9 hits, including a 2nd-inning Hunter Renfroe solo home run, as well as 1 BB. Renfroe's home run was notably the first home run that Brown allowed in his major-league career. Rafael Montero (0–2) took the loss for Houston, pitching 1 inning, striking out 1, while allowing 2 runs on 1 hit and 1 BB. Game 2 went to the Astros in a 3–1 Houston win. Framber Valdez (3–4) recorded the win for the Astros, pitching 8 innings, striking out 12, while allowing 1 earned run on 3 hits, with the 1 run he allowed coming off of a 3rd-inning Zach Neto solo home run, the first of Neto's career. Ryan Pressly recorded the save for the Astros, pitching 1 inning, striking out 2. Shohei Ohtani (4–1) took the loss for the Angels, pitching 7 innings, striking out 7, while allowing 3 runs on 6 hits and 2 BB. All 3 of the Astros' runs came in the 5th inning, when Martín Maldonado hit a 2-run home run, followed by a Yordan Alvarez RBI single. Game 3 was won by the Astros with a 5–4 final score. Cristian Javier (3–1) recorded the win for the Astros, pitching 6 innings, striking out 11, while allowing 2 runs on 3 hits and 1 BB. Both runs he allowed came from Hunter Renfroe's 2nd-inning 2-run home run. Ryan Pressly recorded the save for the Astros, pitching 1 inning, striking out 1, while allowing 2 runs on 4 hits. Griffin Canning (2–1) took the loss for the Angels, pitching 3.2 innings, striking out 3, while allowing 5 runs on 5 hits and 1 BB. Yordan Alvarez hit a solo home run in the 1st inning for the Astros, his 8th of the season.

May 12–14 at Chicago White Sox: HOU won series 2–1

Houston took Game 1 of their three-game series in Chicago, winning 5–1. It was José Abreu's first game since signing with the Astros following the 2022 season. J. P. France (1–0) earned his first major-league win, yielding one run on three hits over 6 2/3 innings, struck out 3, and yielded a solo home run to Luis Robert Jr in the 2nd-inning. France also allowed 1 BB. Michael Kopech (1–4) took the loss for Chicago, pitching 4 2/3 innings, striking out 5, while allowing 2 runs on 1 hit and 6 BB. Yordan Alvarez hit his 9th home run of the season in the 9th inning off of Jimmy Lambert. The White Sox took Game 2 in a 3–1 Chicago win. Dylan Cease started the game for Chicago, pitching 6 scoreless innings, striking out 5, while allowing 4 hits and 2 BB. Joe Kelly (1–1) recorded the win for the White Sox, pitching 1 1/3 scoreless innings, striking out 2, while allowing 1 hit. Kendall Graveman recorded the save for Chicago, pitching 1 scoreless inning, striking out 1, while allowing 1 hit. Brandon Bielak started the game for the Astros, pitching 5 innings, striking out 4, while allowing 1 run on 8 hits, including a 4th-inning Robert Jr. solo home run. Rafael Montero (0–3) took the loss for the Astros, pitching 1 inning, allowing 2 runs on 3 hits. The Astros took Game 3 in a 4–3 win. Hunter Brown (4–1) recorded the win for the Astros, pitching 5 2/3 innings, striking out 8, while allowing on 7 hits and 1 BB. He gave up 2 home runs, including a 4th-inning Robert Jr. solo home run, and a 6th-inning Jake Burger 2-run home run. Ryan Pressly recorded the save for Houston, pitching 1 inning, striking out 1. Lucas Giolito (2–3) took the loss for Chicago, pitching 6 inning, striking out 6, while allowing 4 runs on 7 hits, including a 4th-inning Yainer Díaz solo home run, the first of his career.

May 15–17 vs Chicago Cubs: HOU won series, 3–0

Yordan Alvarez and Chas McCormick each had two hits on May 16 and Cristian Javier (4–1) allowed two hits and one run in six innings to lead the Astros to a 7–3 win. McCormick made a leaping catch at the wall in left center field in the sixth inning to rob Dansby Swanson of an extra base hit with a runner on first base. On May 17, the Astros won, 7–6, for their first walk-off victory of 2023, capped by Kyle Tucker's bases loaded single that scored Jeremy Peña and Alex Bregman for the walk-off. Bregman also homered in the first inning for the Houston's first run of the game and hit an RBI single in the eighth inning. Astros rookie starter J. P. France was hit hard for the first time, giving up six run on nine hits in a career-low 3 2/3 innings. The Astros bullpen allowed no more runs the rest of the way.

May 19–21 vs Oakland Athletics: HOU won series, 3–0

During the series opener versus Oakland, Jose Altuve made his season debut after missing two months from recovery of a fracture of the left thumb. Kyle Tucker hit his seventh home run and collected three RBI to lead a 5–1 win. Astros starter Brandon Bielak (1–1) allowed one run on five hits and three walks and struck out a new career-high nine. On May 20, Astros starting pitcher Hunter Brown allowed two runs over six innings while establishing a new career high in strikeouts with nine. Yordan Alvarez drove in two runs—including hitting a go-ahead solo home run in the eighth inning—as the Astros prevailed, 3–2. Starter Framber Valdez (4–4) hurled a complete game shutout on May 21, the second of his career, leading the Astros to a 2–0 win and series sweep over the A's. Of 30 total batters faced, he allowed four hits, no walks, and struck out seven while inducing 13 ground outs. Jake Meyers reached base in his ninth consecutive plate appearance before a groundout in the eighth inning.

May 22–24 at Milwaukee Brewers: MIL won series, 2–1

In the opening game at American Family Field, the Astros rode five home runs and six strong innings from Cristian Javier (5–1) to rout the Brewers, 12–2. Mauricio Dubón, Corey Julks and Martín Maldonado each hit one homer; Dubón's was his first of the season. Yordan Alvarez hit the other two home runs, including a sixth inning grand slam. In the sixth inning, Jake Meyers made a running catch of an Owen Miller fly ball at the warning track with a runner on base to help preserve a 2–1 Astros lead. On May 23, the Brewers ended the Astros' season-high eight game winning streak with a 6–0 shutout. In the third inning, Altuve singled for his 1,938th career hit to pass José Cruz for third place all-time in Astros' history. Brewers hitters victimized reliever Rafael Montero for four runs in the eighth inning, bringing his total of runs allowed in the month of the May to 13 over eight total outings. In the series finale, Brewers starter Adrian Houser (1–0) retired 14 of the first 16 batters he faced over 5 1/3 innings to lead a second consecutive shutout over the Astros, 4–0. Right-hander Joel Payamps relieved Houser in the sixth inning with Mauricio Dubón on third base and Alex Bregman on second. Payamps struck out Alvarez and induced a fly out from Tucker to squelch the threat.

May 26–28 at Oakland Athletics: HOU won series, 3–0

Rookie starter Hunter Brown (5–1) established a new career-high 10 batters struck out on May 26 while retiring 16 consecutive over seven strong innings to lead the Astros to a 5–2 win. Corey Julks drove in three runs for Houston. On May 27, Jeremy Peña hit a two-run home run on the second pitch of the game while Framber Valdez (5–4) pitched six solid innings to lead a 6–3 win. Alex Bregman had three hits and three RBI. The Astros concluded the series with a season-high seven home runs to power a 10–1 win and sweep of the A's, featuring José Abreu's first home run as an Astro, two home runs from Alvarez and a solid five-inning start from Cristian Javier (6–1). Jake Meyers (3-run HR), Peña (2-run HR), Chas McCormick, and Altuve (solo home runs) each also homered, and Altuve totaled three hits. (Note: The seven home runs tied a club record for one game, first set on September 9, 2000, versus the Chicago Cubs, and September 9, 2019, also against the Athletics.) Abreu's home run was also his first in 260 at bats, dating back to September 13, 2022, finishing the longest home-run drought of his career.

May 29–31 vs Minnesota Twins: MIN won series, 2–1

Minnesota took Game 1 of the 3-game series in a 7–5 Twins win. Sonny Gray started the game on the mound for the Twins, pitching 6 innings, striking out 3, while allowing 3 runs (2 ER) on 4 hits and 3 BB. Brock Stewart recorded a blown save, pitching 1 inning, striking out 1, while allowing 2 runs on 2 hits, with one of those hits being a Jose Altuve grand slam. (Note: The grand slam put Altuve's RBI total over the 700 threshold. The seventh grand slam of his career, it tied him for the lead in club history with Carlos Lee.) Jhoan Durán (1–1) recorded the win for the Twins, pitching 2 scoreless innings, striking out 3, while allowing 1 hit. J. P. France started the game for the Astros, pitching 6 innings, striking out 8, while allowing 4 runs on 7 hits and 3 BB. Héctor Neris recorded a hold, pitching 1 scoreless inning, striking out 2, while allowing 1 hit. Ryan Pressly recorded a blown save, pitching 1 inning, striking out 2, while allowing 1 run on 2 hits and 1 BB. (Note: Prior to this blown save, Pressly had successfully converted 28 consecutive opportunities—including the postseason.) Bryan Abreu (2–1) took the loss for the Astros, pitching 1 inning, striking out 3, while allowing 2 runs (1 ER) on 2 hits and 1 BB. Both of the runs that Abreu allowed came off of Ryan Jeffers' 10th-inning 2-run home run. The Astros took Game 2 in a 5–1 win over Minnesota. Brandon Bielak (2–2) recorded the win for Houston, pitching 5.2 innings, striking out 6, while allowing 1 run on 3 hits and 3 BB. Joe Ryan (7–2) took the loss for the Twins, pitching 4 innings, striking out 6, while allowing 5 runs on 4 hits and 3 BB. Both Alex Bregman and Chas McCormick homered off of Ryan in the 2nd inning, giving the Astros a 3-run lead that Houston didn't relinquish. The Twins won the final game of the series in dominant fashion, beating the Astros 8–2. Louie Varland (3–1) recorded the win for Minnesota, pitching 7 shutout innings, striking out 5, while allowing 4 hits and 1 BB. Minnesota dominated the Astros through the first 7 innings, leading 8–0 going into the bottom of the 8th, where Jake Meyers and Yainer Díaz hit back-to-back home runs, cutting the deficit to 8–2, which would end up being the final score. Hunter Brown (5–2) took the loss for the Astros, pitching 4.2 innings, striking out 8, while allowing 5 runs on 6 hits and 2 BB.

==== June ====
June 1–4 vs Los Angeles Angels: HOU won series, 3–1

Houston took Game 1 of the 4-game series in 5–2 win. Ronel Blanco (1–0) recorded the win for the Astros in his first major league start, pitching 5 1/3 innings, striking out 5, while allowing 2 runs on 7 hits and 3 BB. Héctor Neris, Bryan Abreu, and Rafael Montero all recorded holds for the Astros, and Ryan Pressly recorded the save. Reid Detmers (0–5) took the loss for the Angels, pitching 5 innings, striking out 2, while allowing 4 runs on 6 hits and 2 BB. Manager Dusty Baker passed Joe McCarthy for eighth all-time (2,125) in wins on June 1. In a duel of aces, the Astros took Game 2 in a 6–2 win. Framber Valdez (6–4) recorded the win for the Astros, pitching 7 shutout innings, striking out 7, while allowing 5 hits and 1 BB. Shohei Ohtani (5–2) took the loss for the Angels, pitching 6 innings, striking out 6, while allowing 5 runs on 9 hits and 1 BB. Of the 9 hits Ohtani allowed, 2 were 2-run home runs hit by Yordan Alvarez in the 1st inning, and Corey Julks in the 6th inning. Game 3 and a series win went to the Astros in a 9–6 Houston victory. Cristian Javier (7–1) recorded the win for the Astros, pitching 6 innings, striking out 5, while allowing 1 run on 6 hits. Héctor Neris recorded a hold for Houston in the 7th inning, pitching 2/3 inning, striking out one, while allowing 1 hit and 2 BB. Neris entered the game after Ryne Stanek only managed to record one out in the 7th inning, allowing 4 runs on 3 hits and 1 BB. Patrick Sandoval (3–5) took the loss for the Angels, pitching 3 2/3 innings, striking out 4, while allowing 6 runs on 8 hits and 3 BB. Alex Bregman was 1–1 and became the third player in major league history to draw four walks and hit a grand slam in one game, and became the first player in the Modern Era to do so and hit a grand slam in his only official at bat. (Note: Bobby Bonds and J. D. Martinez are the only other players to hit a grand slam and draw four walks in the same game.) Chas McCormick also homered for the Astros, hitting a 381-foot home run in the 7th inning off of Ben Joyce, which was the first home run allowed by Joyce in his major league career. The Angels won the series finale, 2–1, capped by Ohtani's tie-breaking RBI double in the eighth inning. Yainer Díaz doubled and connected for his third home run for Houston, and Alex Bregman had two hits, extending a hitting streak to 11 games. J. P. France started with a career-high 5 1/3 hitless innings until yielding a home run to Luis Rengifo on the way to a career-high seven innings with three total hits and one walk yielded, and three strikeouts. Former Astro Chris Devenski (3–0) pitched 1 2/3 innings to qualify as the winning pitcher.

June 5–8 at Toronto Blue Jays: TOR won series 3–1

Houston dominated Toronto in Game 1 of the 4-game series, winning 11–4 over the Blue Jays. Brandon Bielak (3–2) recorded the win for the Astros, pitching 6.2 innings, striking out 2, while allowing 3 runs on 10 hits and 1 BB. Alek Manoah (1–7) took the loss for the Blue Jays, only managing to record one out in the first inning, pitching 0.1 innings, while allowing 6 runs on 7 hits and 1 BB. Manoah's struggles were highlighted when Corey Julks hit a grand slam, the first of Julks' career, to extend the Astros lead to 6–0. Yainer Díaz and Jake Meyers both had 4-hit games, and Yordan Alvarez, Kyle Tucker, and Jake Meyers all homered for the Astros as well. Both Alejandro Kirk and Daulton Varsho homered for the Blue Jays, however it wasn't enough, as the Astros still won by a 7-run margin. Toronto bounced back in Game 2 with a 5–1 win over the Astros. Kevin Gausman (5–3) recorded the win for the Blue Jays, pitching 7 innings, striking out 13, while allowing 1 run on 4 hits, with the lone run being scored on a leadoff solo home run hit by Mauricio Dubón in the 1st inning. Erik Swanson recorded a hold for the Blue Jays, pitching 1 scoreless inning, striking out 2. Hunter Brown (5–3) took the loss for the Astros, pitching 6 innings, striking out 5, while allowing 3 runs on 3 hits and 3 BB. 2 of the hits Brown allowed were home runs, hit by George Springer in the 3rd inning, and Daulton Varsho in the 4th inning. The Astros' loss was highlighted by a large offensive struggle, with the Astros striking out 16 times while only scoring 1 run. The Blue Jays took Game 3 in a 3–2 Toronto win. Chris Bassitt (7–4) recorded the win for the Blue Jays, pitching 8 innings, striking out 5, while allowing 2 runs on 4 hits, with both runs allowed by Bassitt coming off of a 4th-inning Yordan Alvarez 2-run home run. Jordan Romano recorded the save for the Blue Jays, pitching a scoreless 9th-inning, striking out 1 while allowing 1 hit. Ronel Blanco started the game on the mound for the Astros, pitching 6 innings, striking out 5, while allowing 2 runs on 3 hits and 4 BB. Héctor Neris (3–2) took the loss for the Astros, pitching 1 inning, allowing 1 run on 1 hit and 2 BB. On offense, the Blue Jays were backed by a pair of home runs hit by Bo Bichette in the 4th inning, and Brandon Belt in the 6th inning. Grae Kessinger made his major league debut for the Astros, starting at third base, going 0–3 with a strikeout. Toronto took Game 3 in a 3–2 win, securing the series win for the Blue Jays. José Berríos (6–4) recorded the win for the Blue Jays, pitching 6 innings, striking out 2, while allowing 2 runs on 4 hits and 2 BB. Yimi García and Erik Swanson both recorded holds for the Blue Jays, and Jordan Romano recorded the save for Toronto. Framber Valdez (6–5) took the loss for the Astros, pitching 5 innings, striking out 5, while allowing 3 runs on 4 hits and 4 BB. Houston's offense once again struggled against Toronto, only putting up 2 runs on 6 hits and 2 BB while striking out 5 times. Of the Astros' 2 runs, one came off of Alex Bregman's 2nd-inning solo home run. The Astros' misfortune extended past their offensive struggles, with Yordan Alvarez exiting the game after only one at-bat, due to "right oblique discomfort." According to Astros manager Dusty Baker, the extent of Alvarez's injury was unknown, with Alvarez being scheduled for evaluation the following day.

June 9–11 at Cleveland Guardians: CLE won series, 2–1

On June 9, LF Yordan Alvarez was placed on the 10-day injured list with a right oblique injury and C César Salazar was recalled from Triple-A Sugar Land. Cleveland took Game 1 of their series against the Astros in a 14-inning, 10–9 Guardians win. Logan Allen started the game on the mound for Cleveland, pitching 6 innings, striking out 4, while allowing 5 runs on 9 hits and 2 BB. Of the 5 runs Allen allowed, 3 of them came off of a 1st-inning 3-run home run hit by José Abreu. Xzavion Curry (3–0) recorded the win for Cleveland, pitching 1 scoreless inning, allowing 1 hit and 1 run (0 ER). Seth Martinez (1–2) took the loss for Houston, pitching 3.1 innings, striking out 4, while allowing 4 runs (1 ER) on 4 hits and 3 BB. Ryne Stanek and Héctor Neris both recorded holds for the Astros, while Rafael Montero and Ryan Pressly both recorded blown saves. In the bottom of the 14th inning, Will Brennan hit a walk-off RBI double for the Guardians, extending the Astros losing streak to 4. On June 10, Ryne Stanek was placed on the bereavement list by the Astros. The Astros bounced back in Game 2, taking the win over Cleveland in a 6–4 Houston victory. J. P. France (2–1) recorded the win for the Astros, pitching 6.2 innings, striking out 6, while allowing 3 runs on 7 hits and 6 BB. Bryan Abreu recorded a hold for the Astros, and Ryan Pressly recorded the save. Triston McKenzie (0–1) took the loss for the Guardians, pitching 5 innings, striking out 5, while allowing 5 runs on 7 hits and 3 BB. Of the 5 runs McKenzie allowed, two of them came off of a 1st-inning 2-run José Abreu home run, giving Abreu home runs in back-to-back games. The Astros stole 6 bases, 5 of which were taken while Mike Zunino was catching. Cleveland took the series win in a 5–0 Guardians victory in Game 3 of the series. Shane Bieber (5–3) recorded the win for the Guardians, pitching 7 innings, striking out 9, while allowing 3 hits and 1 BB. Brandon Bielak (3–5) took the loss for the Astros, pitching 5 innings, striking out 4, while allowing 5 runs on 9 hits and 2 BB. Houston's offense was shut down by Cleveland, only recording 4 hits, one of which being Grae Kessinger's first major league hit, a 5th-inning infield single off of Shane Bieber.

June 13–15 vs Washington Nationals: HOU won series, 2–1

In Washington's first visit to Minute Maid Park since winning Game 7 of the 2019 World Series, Houston won the opener, 6–1, powered by solo home runs from Mauricio Dubón, Kyle Tucker, Martín Maldonado and Chas McCormick, a game of milestones, and a solid start by Hunter Brown. José Abreu had two hits to become the 21st active player to reach 1,500 hits, Jose Altuve became the fourth Astros player to reach 1,000 runs scored, and Maldonado hit his 100th career home run. Brown (6–3) allowed four hits over seven scoreless innings.

June 16–18 at Cincinnati Reds: CIN won series 3–0

Cincinnati won the opener of the three-game set, 2–1, behind a scoreless outing in the third career major league start by Andrew Abbott (3–0). (Note: Abbott became the first pitcher to start his MLB career by hurling three consecutive scoreless starts of at least five innings since 1893 when the mound was moved to its current distance of 60 feet 6 inches (18.44 m).) In his eighth career start, Astro J. P. France (2–2) allowed four hits and two runs over 6 2/3 innings. On June 17, the Reds defeated the Astros, 10–3, led by a Jonathan India home run and Will Benson's three hits and two RBI. Astros starter Brandon Bielak (3–4) allowed India's home run as he surrendered five hits on five runsfour earned–over 4 2/3 innings. Jose Altuve collected four hits—tying his career best—highlighted by a solo homer in the seventh inning. His 35th career four-hit game, it eclipsed Craig Biggio for most in franchise history.

June 27–29 at St. Louis Cardinals: HOU won series, 2–1

The Cardinals won the finale, 14–0. Kyle Tucker homered and drove in five runs while Alex Bregman hit his third grand slam of the month in the ninth inning. The Astros had their largest margin of victory in a shutout win since September 9, 2019, 15–0 versus Oakland, and collected 18 hits, their most since the day following that shutout win, also against Oakland. The grand slam was the seventh of Bregman's career, tying him with Altuve and Carlos Lee for most in franchise history. Bregman tied the major league record as the 10th player to connect for three grand slams in one month. (Note: Bregman succeeded Carlos Beltrán in July 2006, and Yordan Alvarez became the next to accomplish the feat in June 2026.)

June 30 – July 3 at Texas Rangers • Lone Star Series: HOU won series, 3–1

The Astros arrived at Choctaw Stadium five games behind the AL West division-leading Texas Rangers, also the second series of the season between the in-state rivals. It was the first time since 2016 that Houston had been as many games back at this point in the season (80 games).

The Astros won the opener of the four-game series, 5–3. In the sixth inning, Mauricio Dubón lined a go-ahead, two-run double and Jose Altuve hit the first pitch of the game from Jon Gray (6–4) for a leadoff home run to back rookie starter Ronel Blanco's (2–0) five innings with three runs allowed. Houston's bullpen retired 12 of 13 batters. Altuve's home run was his 34th career leadoff home run.

==== July ====
The Rangers won on July 1, 5–2, powered by Nathan Eovaldi's seven scoreless innings, and 15 hits versus the Astros' four. Astros starter Hunter Brown was inefficient, requiring 91 pitches to get through four innings, allowing 10 hits. Also, the Rangers stole four bases in four attempts with Martín Maldonado catching. On July 2, Chas McCormick hit a bases-loaded tie-breaking triple with two outs in the eighth inning to lead a 5–3 Astros victory. Framber Valdez and Yordan Alvarez were named to the AL All-Star team in spite of dealing with injury. Shawn Dubin made his first major league start in place of Valdez, who was unavailable due to a sore right ankle. Dubin allowed one run over four innings. The Astros won, 12–11, on July 3 for a 3–1 series win over Texas despite blowing an 8-run lead. José Abreu and Chas McCormick hit back-to-back RBI doubles in the ninth inning, and both hit home runs earlier in the game. Abreu's home run was the 250th of his career, hit against Glenn Otto. Kyle Tucker hit the Astros' eighth grand slam in the second inning, which led the major leagues. Texas scored multiple runs in each of the third, fourth, and fifth innings off Astros starter Cristian Javier, who registered his fifth consecutive no-decision since winning five games in a row. Travis Jankowski collected three hits, five RBI and homered for Texas, while Adolis García hit his 21st home run and MLB-leading 69th RBI. The Astros went 6–4 on their season-long 10-game road trip.

July 4–5 vs Colorado Rockies: HOU won series, 2–0

Rookie Grae Kessinger hit his first career home run, and Corey Julks, also a rookie, had a career-high four hits with a double and an RBI to lead the Astros to a 4–1 win over Colorado. Kessinger hit his home run off Kyle Freeland (4–9) in the third inning to left center field. Brandon Bielak (4–4) allowed two hits over seven innings for the win. He walked four batters to tie a career high, but was assisted by two double plays. Yainer Díaz homered in his first two at bats on July 5 for his first career multi-homer game to lead the Astros to a 6–4 win over the Rockies and sweep of the two-game set. Jeremy Peña, who returned to the lineup following a five-game absence for neck stiffness, also homered in his return. Astros starter J. P. France (4–3) allowed three runs over six innings, his seventh consecutive start with at least six innings.

July 14–16 at Los Angeles Angels: HOU won series, 2–1

In the opening game of the second half of the season, the Astros won 7–5. Astros rookie J. P. France, entering the contest with six consecutive quality starts, saw that streak ended as he allowed four runs (two earned) in less than five innings. The Astros capitalized on Angels' errors of execution, including in the bottom of the sixth inning. On a Michael Stefanic bunt attempt, catcher Martín Maldonado picked Angels baserunner Hunter Renfroe off second base to end an Angels rally. The Angels won the middle game of the set, 13–12, on a walk-off error in the bottom of the tenth inning after mounting pair of comebacks in the later innings. In the seventh, the Astros led 9–3 after a José Abreu 3-run home run to back ace Framber Valdez, who tied his career high with 13 strikeouts over 6 1/3 innings. Valdez then allowed a two-run home to Zach Neto and exited following left calf discomfort. The Angels scored four more times in the seventh to tie the game 9–9 capped by Mike Moustakas' three-run home run off Bryan Abreu. Chas McCormick homered in the eighth and the Astros led 12–9 going into the bottom of the ninth. Closer Ryan Pressly, entering with a streak of 12 no-hit innings in 11 appearances, allowed three runs on five hits in the bottom of the ninth to send the game to extra innings. In the bottom of the tenth, rookie Grae Kessinger, substituting for an injured Jeremy Peña earlier in the inning, threw wide of first base on a potential inning-ending double play to allow Angels rookie Trey Cabbage to score the winning run. The Astros' bullpen surrendered a season-high eight runs, six of which were earned. McCormick led Houston's lineup by reaching base five times and scoring four total runs. It was Houston's first loss when scoring 12 or more runs since a 14–12 defeat to the Chicago Cubs on August 20, 2002, a streak of 104 games, including in the postseason. Alex Bregman's ninth inning home run off Jaime Barría reversed an Astros deficit, and Kyle Tucker followed with another home run to lift the Astros to a 9–8 win. Phil Maton registered his first save since 2017 after freezing an Angels' rally, including Tucker's outstretched, game-ending catch of a Matt Thaiss sinking line drive. The Astros overcame a 7–3 deficit in the seventh inning through hitting five home runs over the final three frames, including Bregman's, Tucker's, two from Chas McCormick, and one from Jake Meyers. Bregman and Tucker both had four hits apiece while McCormick had three. Newly acquired reliever Joel Kuhnel made his Astros debut and worked parts of two innings.

Following the weekend series after the All-Star break, July 14–16, McCormick was named AL Player of the Week, the first Astro to win the honor on the season. He went 7-for-11, batting .636 with an OPS of 2.188, three home runs, drove in five runs, scored seven times and drew three walks. On July 15, McCormick also became the first Astro on the season to score four times in one game. His two home runs on July 16 were crucial in 9–8 win.

July 20–23 at Oakland Athletics: HOU won series, 3–1

The Astros opened the series at the Oakland Coliseum with 3–1 win on July 20. Rookie J. P. France (5–3) worked into the eighth inning for the first time in the major leagues, and Kyle Tucker delivered a go-ahead two-run double in the sixth inning. At that point in the season, France had posted the lowest road ERA (2.05) of all major league among pitchers with at least 40 innings on the road. On July 21, Tucker launched three home runs for his first career three-home run game, and drove in four runs to lead a 6–4 win over the A's. He was the third visiting player to do this since the A's moved into the Oakland Coliseum in 1968. Alex Bregman also homered for the Astros. Ryan Pressly pitched the ninth inning to close out his 100th career regular-season save, and 99th as Astro. The A's won on July 22, 4–1, as Jace Peterson hit a go-ahead two-run single in the seventh, and Zack Gelof hit his first major league home run. Oakland snapped an eight-game losing streak to Houston. Astros starter Cristian Javier hurled 5 1/3 hitless innings until Gelof's one-out single in the sixth but got just one more out as he finished with a season-high six walks to go with five strikeouts. The Astros won the finale, 3–2, as Mauricio Dubón hit a home run in the top of the ninth inning. Yainer Díaz connected for his 11th home run and had two hits. Jeremy Peña drew a one-out walk versus Chad Smith (1–2) in the ninth but was caught stealing on a missed sign before Dubón homered one at bat later. Héctor Neris (6–2) pitched out of a jam in the eighth with the go-ahead runner on third base to record the win and Bryan Abreu secured the final three outs for his third save.

July 24–26 vs Texas Rangers • Lone Star Series: HOU won series, 2–1

The Astros, entering the series in second place in the AL West three games behind Texas, won the first game 10–9 behind a career-best six RBI performance from Chas McCormick, capped by Yainer Díaz' first career walk-off hit. In the seventh, the Rangers snapped a 6–6 tie. Phil Maton faced four batters, loading the bases, and was relieved without recording an out. Ryne Stanek allowed two of the inherited runners to score with a walk and sacrifice fly to give the Rangers a 9–6 lead. Aroldis Chapman allowed a three-run home to McCormick in the seventh to tie the game. In the bottom of the ninth, Díaz singled to score Kyle Tucker inches ahead of the relay for the walk-off run. On July 25, Kyle Tucker and Martín Maldonado homered, rookie starter J. P. France allowed five hits and two walks over seven solid innings to lead the Astros to a 4–3 win and move to a game behind Texas. Pressly allowed a two-run home run to Mitch Garver in the top of the ninth but held the lead, 4–3, for the save. It was Pressly's 100th save as a member of the Astros, making him the fourth pitcher to do so, joining Billy Wagner (225), Dave Smith (199) and Brad Lidge (123). Texas won the finale, 12–5, led by Adolis García's grand slam and three other Rangers home runs. García hit his grand slam in a seven-run fifth inning and he and Marcus Semien exchanged words with Maldonado as they crossed home plate A benches-clearing scrum ensued though no punches were thrown. Maldonado and Semien were ejected.

On July 28, 2023, the Astros reacquired relief pitcher Kendall Graveman via trade with the Chicago White Sox for catching prospect Korey Lee. The Astros originally traded for Graveman in July 2021 alongside fellow reliever Rafael Montero from Seattle. Graveman made 23 appearances for Houston that year, and made 11 more in that year's postseason, including closing out three games versus the Atlanta Braves in the World Series.

July 28–30 at Tampa Bay Rays: TB won series, 2–1

Brandon Lowe hit a three-run home in the first inning, and, in the ninth, José Siri doubled and scored the tie-breaking run versus Ryan Pressly (3–3) to lead to the Rays to a 4–3 win in the series opener. In the middle game, Jeremy Peña collected a career-best four RBI, and Yainer Díaz and José Abreu both added three to lead the Houston Astros to have their highest-scoring output of the season in a 17–4 win over Tampa Bay. It topped the 14 versus St. Louis on June 29. Starter Hunter Brown (7–7) allowed two runs in three innings for his first win since June 13. Tampa Bay won the finale, 8–2, led by a three-run double in the first inning by Josh Lowe and a two-run home in the sixth by Brandon Lowe, who also had three hits. The Rays scored four in the first inning off starter Brandon Bielak (5–6), who was tabbed with the loss.

Per an OptaSTATS tweet on July 31, "one of the most accurate predictors of the Houston Astros' success appears to be Yordan Alvarez' ability to get on base." The Astros reached a highest-all-time record 170–48 (.780 winning percentage) in games in which Alvarez reached base at least twice following the 17–4 win over Tampa Bay. (Note: Minimum 200 games in the modern era; qualification of a team's winning percentage was based on a single player in such games. The previous highest-winning percentage was connected to New York Yankees first baseman Joe Collins, who went 210–63 when he reached base multiple times from 1948 to 1957. Collins won six World Series championships.) Alvarez was 3-for-5 with a home run.

July 31 – August 2 vs Cleveland Guardians: HOU won series, 3–0

The Astros won the opener versus Cleveland, 7–3, to move within a half-game of the idling Texas Rangers, leaders of the AL West, behind a strong starting pitching performance from J. P. France and Yordan Alvarez' three-run home run. France (7–3) allowed two runs on seven hits over seven innings for a fifth consecutive win. The Astros were stymied by Cleveland starter Noah Syndergaard, who allowed two hits and one run over 5 1/3 innings until a Jeremy Peña line drive struck his lower right and led to his removal from the game.

==== August ====
Moments before MLB's trade deadline on August 1, 2023, the Astros reacquired Justin Verlander from the New York Mets along with cash considerations in a trade for outfield prospects Drew Gilbert and Ryan Clifford. During the 2022–23 offseason, Verlander had signed with the Mets in free agency through the 2024 season for $43.333 million (USD$, 45.8 million today) per year, with a vesting player option for 2025 at $35 million (USD$, 37 million today). Verlander anchored the rotation during the Astros' six consecutive ALCS appearances from 2017 to 2022, including two World Series championships, while winning two Cy Young Awards and establishing numerous team records.

Verlander's return after less than one season

“That's something you know (that) we got him back. I mean, I've never seen that in my whole career. You might get a guy back at the end of the year, two years or three years (later), but we got him back in the same year.”

— Manager Dusty Baker, in-game interview with Fox Sports on August 3, 2023

Framber Valdez' no-hitter. Hours after the Astros traded for Verlander, Framber Valdez no-hit the Guardians, 2–0, for the 16th no-hitter in Astros' history. (Note: Verlander threw the last complete game no-hitter for the Astros, on September 1, 2019, versus Toronto. Valdez' was the first regular season no-hitter for the Astros since June 25, 2022, in which Cristian Javier, Héctor Neris and Ryan Pressly combined to no-hit the New York Yankees.) He struck out seven as he threw 65 of 93 total pitches for strikes. He faced the minimum 27 batters and allowed just one baserunner, a walk to Oscar González, who was erased by a double play. The 50th win of Valdez' career, it was the first no-hitter by an Astros left-hander, and was also the first Astros no-hitter to feature the minimum 27 batters faced. Kyle Tucker singled home two runs in the third inning to account for the only runs of the game. Chas McCormick homered twice in the finale and drove in three runs to power the Astros' 3–2 win and sweep the series. It was the second multi-homer game of the season for McCormick. The Astros concluded a nine-game homestand against Texas, Tampa Bay, and Cleveland with a 6–3 record.

August 3–6 at New York Yankees: HOU split series, 2–2

The Astros travelled to Yankee Stadium to meet the Yankees for the first time in 2023, dropping the series opener, 4–3. Giancarlo Stanton and Bill McKinney hit back-to-back home runs in the first inning off Astros starter Cristian Javier for a 3–0 lead. Jake Meyers and Martín Maldonado hit RBI singles in the second inning before Kyle Tucker homered leading off the sixth inning to tie the game 3–3. In the bottom of the sixth inning, Anthony Volpe hit a tie-breaking single versus Kendall Graveman (3–5) that drove in the decisive run for the Yankees. Maldonado collected a three-hit game for the sixth time in six seasons as an Astro. In the second game of the series, Yainer Díaz hit a three-run first inning home run, and Yordan Alvarez added a home run in the fifth inning on the way to a 7–3 win. Rookie Hunter Brown (8–7) allowed two runs on five hits over six innings to win consecutive starts, which he had not accomplished since April. Justin Verlander made his 2023 Astros debut on August 5, allowing two runs over seven solid innings in a losing effort to the Yankees, 3–1. Astros hitters had difficulty timing starter Nestor Cortés Jr. on the way to striking 16 total times against Yankee pitching. Jose Altuve stole second in the first inning, the 288th of his career, to tie for third place in club history with César Cedeño. In the third inning, Altuve hit a solo home run versus Cortés for the 200th of his career, making him the fifth Astro to reach the milestone. (Note: The other four Astros who previously reached the milestone are Jeff Bagwell, Craig Biggio, Lance Berkman, and Jimmy Wynn.) José Urquidy made his first appearance in more than three months, Jake Meyers hit two three-run home runs, and the Astros won the series finale, 9–7. Meyers' six RBI established a new career-high, and Yordan Alvarez and Martín Maldonado both added home runs. Astros pitching issued a season-high 12 bases on balls. J. P. France (8–3) made his first career relief appearance, allowing an unearned run in 3 1/2 innings to earn the win, and Bryan Abreu worked the ninth to complete his fourth save of the season.

Champions honored at White House. On Monday, August 7, the Astros visited the White House and met with President Joe Biden to commemorate their 2022 World Series championship prior to arriving in Baltimore to play the Orioles at Oriole Park at Camden Yards.

For his no-hit effort, Valdez was named AL Player of the Week for July 31 – August 6, his first weekly award. Valdez joined Chas McCormick as the second Astro to receive the award in 2023, who won for the dates of July 14–16 following the All-Star break.

August 8–10 at Baltimore Orioles: HOU won series, 2–1

In the top of the ninth inning of the series opener, Kyle Tucker battled through a nine-pitch at bat to hit a go-ahead grand slam against All-Star closer Félix Bautista for an eventual 7–6 Astros win. Jon Singleton made his first appearance as an Astro since 2015. He pinch hit to lead off the ninth inning, drew a walk from Bautista and scored on Tucker's grand slam. Jeremy Peña had three hits, his most since a four-hit game on June 9; since that game, he had been hitting .224/.298/.283. Framber Valdez, who made his first start since the no-hitter, allowed six earned runs over seven innings and left with the Astros trailing, 6–2. Kyle Tucker, Jose Altuve, and Alex Bregman led the way for an 8–2 win on August 9 as Dusty Baker took sole possession of seventh place all-time in managerial wins. Baker passed Bucky Harris with 2,159. Tucker homered early to put the Astros ahead for the second straight game and Altuve and Bregman added two RBI apiece in a four-run eighth inning. Cristian Javier (8–2) allowed two runs over five innings for his first win since June 3—nine consecutive winless starts including eight no decisions and one loss. Baltimore entered the finale having gone 75 consecutive series without being swept. In the finale, Altuve homered and doubled and collected his 36th career four-hit game to extend a team record, and Yainer Díaz also homered; however, their efforts fells short as Baltimore won, 5–4. Hunter Brown (8–8) allowed all five runs over six innings. Trailing 5–3 in the ninth inning, the Astros again loaded the bases versus Bautista. Díaz lined an RBI single off the glove of third baseman Ramón Urías to score Altuve. However, Singleton was retired on a pop up to end the game.

August 11–13 vs Los Angeles Angels: HOU won series, 2–1

Singleton returns to Minute Maid Park. Jon Singleton, making his return to Minute Maid Park for the first time since 2015, homered twice for his first career multi-home run game while driving in a career-high five runs to lead an 11–3 win over Los Angeles in the series opener. (Note: Singleton's home runs were his first hit in the major leagues since July 29, 2015, in a 6–3 win over the Angels, constituting the longest gap of time for home runs hit by a position player since Rafael Belliard hit one after 10 years, 144 days in 1997, and the longest since pitcher Jake Peavy hit one after nine years, 52 days in 2015.) Justin Verlander (7–6) made his 500th career game started while allowing three runs over six innings and striking out 7 for his 251st career win. (Note: Verlander became the 50th pitcher in major league history to reach the milestone while joining former Astro Zack Greinke as the only active pitchers with at least 500 career starts.) Jose Altuve reached base five times, and Singleton, Jeremy Peña, and Martín Maldonado each collected three hits.

Reliever Phil Maton was placed on the 15-day injured list (IL) on August 12 following a line drive comebacker striking his pitching elbow in the ninth inning of the Astros' 11–3 win on August 11. The Astros also placed José Abreu on the injured list (10 days) with lower back discomfort.

Brown and Doran inducted into Astros Team Hall of Fame. Prior to the start of the August 12 game versus the Angels, broadcaster Bill Brown and second baseman Bill Doran were honored in an induction ceremony into the Houston Astros Hall of Fame. Brown, the fifth non-player to receive the honor, worked for the Astros from 1987 to 2016 as the play-by-play announcer. He described the exploits of seven playoff teams, Craig Biggio's 3,000th hit, Jeff Bagwell's 400th home run, and the final game at the Astrodome, among others. Doran, the 21st player inducted, was a sixth-round pick of the Astros in 1979, and spent nine of 12 major league seasons in Houston. He placed fifth in the National League (NL) Rookie of the Year voting in 1983 and listed in NL Most Valuable Player Award (MVP) voting each season from 1985–1987. The owner of a .354 career on-base percentage (OBP), Doran collected more walks (709) than strikeouts (600).

The Astros took the middle game of the series versus Los Angeles, 11–3, behind a 9-for-16 showing with four walks and eight RBI from the Astros 1-through-4 hitters. Houston starter J. P. France (9–3. 2.74 ERA) allowed just two runs over seven innings. Kyle Tucker hit his 22nd home run and drove in three runs, giving him four home runs and 16 RBI in 11 August games. Jose Altuve, riding a 14-game hitting streak, got another three hits, leaving him 7 shy of 2,000. During the hitting streak, he hit for a .536 OBP and .456 batting average. José Urquidy tossed a bounceback 5 innings in the last game of the series, striking out a season high 7 and allowing 1 run, three hits, and no walks as the Angels triumphed, 2–1. The offense sputtered, leaving nine runners stranded and went 0-for-8 with runners in scoring position. Jon Singleton drew a one-out walk in the sixth, advanced on Mauricio Dubón's single and scored on José Soriano's wild pitch. Jose Altuve's 14-game hitting streak was snapped. Shohei Ohtani's home run off Parker Mushinski was the decisive hit.

Following a 13-for-25 performance to include extending a hit streak to 14 games, Jose Altuve earned his fourth career Player of the Week Award for August 7–13. He also prolonged a 15-game on-base streak and cumulated 3 three-hit games. Altuve became the third Astro of the season–and second consecutive–to be so honored, following Framber Valdez.

August 14–16 at Miami Marlins: HOU won series, 2–1

Powered by consecutive home runs from Jorge Soler, Luis Arráez, and Josh Bell in the eighth inning, the Marlins claimed the opener, 5–1. Astros starter Framber Valdez (−8) allowed just four hits and two runs over 7 2/3 innings before allowing home runs to Soler and Arráez. Héctor Neris relieved Valdez and allowed the home run to Bell. Astros hitters stranded 10 runners and went 2-for-12 with runners in scoring position. Kyle Tucker hit the tie-breaking home run in the seventh inning on August 15, and Chas McCormick and Yainer Díaz both added home runs to lead the Astros past the Marlins, 6–5. Hunter Brown (9–8) tossed two scoreless frames to earn the win in his first relief outing of the season, and Ryan Pressly stranded Jesús Sánchez after a one-out double for a scoreless ninth to earn his 28th save. Prior to the contest, the Astros presented Yuli Gurriel with his 2022 World Series ring. Alex Bregman, Kyle Tucker, and Chas McCormick each hit first inning home runs in the finale, mounting five runs that inning and another six in the seventh inning to power a 12–5 Houston win as Justin Verlander (8–6) earn the second win in his return as an Astro. Verlander worked five innings, allowed five runs walked two, and struck out two. Bregman, Tucker, Alvarez, and Mauricio Dubón each had two hits. Jon Singeton had one hit and two walks.

August 25–27 at Detroit Tigers: HOU won series, 2–1

The Tigers won the opener, 4–1, as Parker Meadows' first major league home run won it for Detroit on a walk-off, three-run home run. The Astros led 1–0 going into the ninth inning after Framber Valdez' seven hitless. Valdez became the seventh pitcher in history to turn two hitless outings of at least seven innings in the same season, and the first since Max Scherzer in 2015. On August 26, the Astros won, 9–2, led by Alex Bregman's home run, two doubles, three RBI, and two walks. José Abreu and Chas McCormick each drove in two runs. Eight of the Astros' runs were scored by Jose Altuve, Bregman and Kyle Tucker, three of the first four batters in Houston's lineup. Hunter Brown (10–9) worked five innings, allowed four hits and two runs, and struck out nine. The Astros won the series on August 27 with a 17–4, behind Jeremy Peña's career-high five hits, greatly contributing to a team record-tying 25 hits. Kyle Tucker (26), Mauricio Dubón (7), Martín Maldonado (11) and Yainer Diaz (19) each homered. Justin Verlander (10–6) earned his 100th career win at Comerica Park with five shutout innings to become the 36th pitcher to win as many games in a single stadium. He faced longtime Tigers teammate Miguel Cabrera for likely the final time, as Cabrera intended to retired following the season. In the eighth inning, Cabrera hit a three-run homer for his 510th.

August 28–30 at Boston Red Sox: HOU won series, 3–0

Jose Altuve's cycle highlights club hitting record and first-ever sweep at Fenway. The Astros ended the month of August with 52 runs scored on 78 hits to power five consecutive victories, including a sweep of the Red Sox at Fenway Park. Houston won the opener by a score of 13–5, led by Jose Altuve hitting for the cycle, the first of his career. (Note: It was the first cycle hit by an Astro since Brandon Barnes did so on July 19, 2013, versus Seattle, a game in which both Altuve and Barnes were in the same starting lineup.) Among 18 Astros hits, José Abreu homered, and Yordan Alvarez hit a three-run home run to end a streak of 84 plate appearances without a home run. He was 4-for-4 overall and walked twice to reach base six times in the game to tie a team record. José Urquidy tossed the last four innings with one run allowed to convert his first career save. Alex Bregman and Yordan Alvarez hit back-to-back home runs in the first inning to ignite a 6–2 win over Boston in the middle game. Rookie starter J. P. France (10–5), making a consecutive appearance against Boston, bounced back from allowing 10 runs in 2 1/3 innings in a 17–1 loss and held the Red Sox to two runs on five hits over 5 2/3 innings. Mauricio Dubón hit a two-run double in the sixth for Houston. It was the fourth straight win for the Astros, who scored 45 runs during that streak. Behind a solid effort from Framber Valdez (10–9) which included a shutout into the sixth inning, the Astros won the finale, 7–4. Valdez held Boston hitless until a Justin Turner bloop single into center with one out in the fourth, extending a no-hit streak to 10 1/3 innings. Michael Brantley, Jeremy Peña and Martín Maldonado each had two hits for Houston. However, Boston scored all of its runs versus Valdez, although two were unearned as a consequence of a throwing error by Peña.

==== September ====
September 1–3 vs New York Yankees: NYY won series, 3–0

Justin Verlander (10–7) allowed a season-high four home runs, including to Jasson Domínguez in his first major league at bat, becoming the youngest Yankee to do so (20 years, 206 days). Aaron Judge hit his 250th home run, reaching the mark in the fewest games in major league history (810) to lead the Yankees to a 6–2 Yankees win in the series opener. In the middle game, Astros rookie starter Hunter Brown (10–10) labored through four innings, throwing 94 pitches to allow five runs in a 5–4 loss. In the fourth inning, Yainer Díaz hit his 20th home run, coming against Luis Severino. Díaz became the seventh rookie in Astros history to hit 20 or more home runs. In the finale, Domínguez hit a tie-breaking three-run home in the sixth inning to lead a 6–1 Yankees win and series sweep of the Astros at Minute Maid Park.

September 4–6 at Texas Rangers • HOU won Silver Boot, 8–5, and series,3–0

In the opener of the final series of the season between Houston and Texas, the Astros won, 13–6. Mauricio Dubón and Jose Altuve, batting ninth and leadoff, respectively, connected for back-to-back home runs in the sixth and ninth innings. It was Dubón's first career multi-home run game. Yainer Díaz hit a three-run home run to highlight a six-run seventh inning. Altuve had four hits, and Alex Bregman was 4-for-4 and reached base five times. Per OptaSTATS, it was the first time in major league history that the number nine and leadoff hitters hit back-to-back home runs twice in the same game. Reliever Ryne Stanek, working the bottom of the ninth to close out the game for Houston, faced just two batters as he suffered what appeared to be a serious ankle injury as he covered first base on a ground ball. He was carted off the field. The Astros clinched the 2023 Silver Boot by clinching the season series with their seventh win. The following game, Altuve connected for three home runs in the first three innings—becoming the fourth player in major league history to do so—to lead a 14–1 rout of Texas. The four home runs over four plate appearances tied the major leagues record and Altuve became the first Astros player to hit five home runs in two games. Martín Maldonado had his first multi-home run game since July 2022 and Yordan Alvarez also homered as the Astros took over sole possession of first place for the first time all season; Texas had occupied first place in the AL West in 148 of the first 149 days of the season. In the finale, Justin Verlander and Max Scherzer, teammates in a combined six seasons between the Detroit Tigers and New York Mets, faced each other for the first time in their careers. The Astros scored 7 runs off Scherzer, highlighted by a José Abreu grand slam in the third inning, and preceded by a Yordan Alvarez and Michael Brantley home run in each of the first two innings. In the ninth, Abreu added a three-run home run to lead a 12–3 win that created the sweep. The seven RBI tied a career high; it was his both his first grand slam and multi-homer game as an Astro, and he totaled 11 RBI in the series. Chas McCormick hit his 20th home run in the ninth. The Astros outscored the Rangers 39–10 on their way to a club-record 50 hits and a record-tying 16 home runs over a 3-game series. Verlander notched six strikeouts on 100 pitches for his 255th career win, placing him 43rd all-time.

September 8–10 vs San Diego Padres: HOU won series, 2–1

Houston gave up the series opener in an 11–2 blowout by the Padres. Hunter Brown (10–11) took the loss, pitching 4.1 innings, allowing 6 runs on 6 hits and 2 walks, while striking out 5. Phil Maton relieved Brown in the 5th, pitching 0.2 innings and striking out one. The Padres then blew the game wide open after José Urquidy entered the game, with him pitching 4 innings, allowing 5 runs on 4 hits and 2 walks, striking out 3. This brought Urquidy's ERA up to 5.98, continuing his tough season after injury. Blake Snell (13–9) recorded the win for the Padres, pitching 6 innings, striking out 8, while allowing 2 runs on 5 hits and 3 walks. San Diego also stole 5 bases off of Astros’ catcher Martín Maldonado. During the finale, Kyle Tucker became the third player in AL history to connect for two triple during the same inning, and the eighth major leaguer since 1900. During an eight-run sixth inning, Tucker struck first off right-hander Tim Hill and second off southpaw Rich Hill.

September 22–24 vs Kansas City Royals: KC won series, 3–0

The Royals (54–102) remained hot, hitting four home runs to win their tenth of 11, sixth overall, fifth of six from the Astros within the past week and to sweep the Astros at Minute Maid Park. The Royals built a 6–1 lead; meanwhile, the Astros came within one run as early as the fifth inning with Yordan Alvarez' 29th home run. However, the Astros hit just 1-for-10 with runners in scoring position and the Royals held on for a 6–5 win to sweep the Astros for a 39–42 final home record. They welcomed a total of 3,052,347 fans to Minute Maid Park, the highest since 2004 with a record 3,087,872. It was the first time since 2007 that at least 3 million attended.

For the final week of the regular season, Verlander earned his 10th career AL Player of the Week Award for the period of September 25 – October 1. He posted a 2–0 record with a 0.69 ERA and 13 strikeouts over 13 IP, both in crucial outings against Seattle and Arizona during the Astros' final road trip that were instrumental in winning the AL West division title. He become the fourth Astro to win Player of the Week in 2023, and it was the fifth time overall. Since its inception in 1973, Verlander became the fourth pitcher to win the award as many as 10 times. (Note: Nolan Ryan (13), Roger Clemens (11) and Randy Johnson (10), were the first three pitchers to be named Player of the Week 10 or more times, and each pitched for the Astros.)

Alvarez named AL Player of the Month. Yordan Alvarez hit .294/.441/.620, eight home runs and 20 RBIs in 27 games, including the October 1 regular-season finale on the way to being named AL Player of the Month in September. For the season he hit 31 home runs, 97 RBIs and a .990 OPS in 114 games.

==== Performance overview ====
The Astros drew 3,052,347 fans in home attendance, their highest figure since 2004 when they aggregated 3,087,872. It was the fifth campaign in club history to host at least 3 million attendees, each occurring since 2000, and first since 2007, when they drew 3,020,405. Their average home attendance of 37,683 placed seventh in the league.

=== League standings ===
==== American League West ====
AL West
| Team | W | L | Pct. | GB | Home | Road |
|---|---|---|---|---|---|---|
| Houston Astros | 90 | 72 | .556 | — | 39‍–‍42 | 51‍–‍30 |
| Texas Rangers | 90 | 72 | .556 | — | 50‍–‍31 | 40‍–‍41 |
| Seattle Mariners | 88 | 74 | .543 | 2 | 45‍–‍36 | 43‍–‍38 |
| Los Angeles Angels | 73 | 89 | .451 | 17 | 38‍–‍43 | 35‍–‍46 |
| Oakland Athletics | 50 | 112 | .309 | 40 | 26‍–‍55 | 24‍–‍57 |

==== American League Wild Card ====
AL Wild Card standings

Division leaders
| Team | W | L | Pct. |
|---|---|---|---|
| Baltimore Orioles | 101 | 61 | .623 |
| Houston Astros | 90 | 72 | .556 |
| Minnesota Twins | 87 | 75 | .537 |

Wild Card teams (Top 3 teams qualify for postseason)
| Team | W | L | Pct. | GB |
|---|---|---|---|---|
| Tampa Bay Rays | 99 | 63 | .611 | +10 |
| Texas Rangers | 90 | 72 | .556 | +1 |
| Toronto Blue Jays | 89 | 73 | .549 | — |
| Seattle Mariners | 88 | 74 | .543 | 1 |
| New York Yankees | 82 | 80 | .506 | 7 |
| Boston Red Sox | 78 | 84 | .481 | 11 |
| Detroit Tigers | 78 | 84 | .481 | 11 |
| Cleveland Guardians | 76 | 86 | .469 | 13 |
| Los Angeles Angels | 73 | 89 | .451 | 16 |
| Chicago White Sox | 61 | 101 | .377 | 28 |
| Kansas City Royals | 56 | 106 | .346 | 33 |
| Oakland Athletics | 50 | 112 | .309 | 39 |

==== Record versus opponents ====
American League

2023 American League record Source: MLB Standings Grid – 2023
| Team | BAL | BOS | CWS | CLE | DET | HOU | KC | LAA | MIN | NYY | OAK | SEA | TB | TEX | TOR | NL |
|---|---|---|---|---|---|---|---|---|---|---|---|---|---|---|---|---|
| Baltimore | — | 7–6 | 4–2 | 3–4 | 6–1 | 3–3 | 5–1 | 5–2 | 4–2 | 7–6 | 6–1 | 4–2 | 8–5 | 3–3 | 10–3 | 26–20 |
| Boston | 6–7 | — | 2–4 | 3–3 | 5–1 | 2–5 | 5–2 | 3–4 | 4–3 | 9–4 | 4–2 | 3–3 | 2–11 | 3–3 | 7–6 | 20–26 |
| Chicago | 2–4 | 4–2 | — | 8–5 | 5–8 | 3–4 | 6–7 | 3–4 | 4–9 | 4–2 | 3–4 | 2–4 | 1–6 | 1–5 | 0–6 | 15–31 |
| Cleveland | 4–3 | 3–3 | 5–8 | — | 4–9 | 2–4 | 7–6 | 3–4 | 7–6 | 2–4 | 5–1 | 4–3 | 3–3 | 3–3 | 4–3 | 20–26 |
| Detroit | 1–6 | 1–5 | 8–5 | 9–4 | — | 3–3 | 10–3 | 3–3 | 8–5 | 2–5 | 3–4 | 3–3 | 1–5 | 3–4 | 2–4 | 21–25 |
| Houston | 3–3 | 5–2 | 4–3 | 4–2 | 3–3 | — | 1–5 | 9–4 | 2–4 | 2–5 | 10–3 | 4–9 | 3–3 | 9–4 | 3–4 | 28–18 |
| Kansas City | 1–5 | 2–5 | 7–6 | 6–7 | 3–10 | 5–1 | — | 2–4 | 4–9 | 2–4 | 2–4 | 1–6 | 3–4 | 1–5 | 1–6 | 16–30 |
| Los Angeles | 2–5 | 4–3 | 4–3 | 4–3 | 3–3 | 4–9 | 4–2 | — | 3–3 | 4–2 | 7–6 | 5–8 | 2–4 | 6–7 | 2–4 | 19–27 |
| Minnesota | 2–4 | 3–4 | 9–4 | 6–7 | 5–8 | 4–2 | 9–4 | 3–3 | — | 4–3 | 5–1 | 3–4 | 1–5 | 5–2 | 3–3 | 25–21 |
| New York | 6–7 | 4–9 | 2–4 | 4–2 | 5–2 | 5–2 | 4–2 | 2–4 | 3–4 | — | 5–1 | 4–2 | 5–8 | 3–4 | 7–6 | 23–23 |
| Oakland | 1–6 | 2–4 | 4–3 | 1–5 | 4–3 | 3–10 | 4–2 | 6–7 | 1–5 | 1–5 | — | 1–12 | 2–5 | 4–9 | 2–4 | 14–32 |
| Seattle | 2–4 | 3–3 | 4–2 | 3–4 | 3–3 | 9–4 | 6–1 | 8–5 | 4–3 | 2–4 | 12–1 | — | 3–4 | 4–9 | 3–3 | 22–24 |
| Tampa Bay | 5–8 | 11–2 | 6–1 | 3–3 | 5–1 | 3–3 | 4–3 | 4–2 | 5–1 | 8–5 | 5–2 | 4–3 | — | 2–4 | 7–6 | 27–19 |
| Texas | 3–3 | 3–3 | 5–1 | 3–3 | 4–3 | 4–9 | 5–1 | 7–6 | 2–5 | 4–3 | 9–4 | 9–4 | 4–2 | — | 6–1 | 22–24 |
| Toronto | 3–10 | 6–7 | 6–0 | 3–4 | 4–2 | 4–3 | 6–1 | 4–2 | 3–3 | 6–7 | 4–2 | 3–3 | 6–7 | 1–6 | — | 30–16 |

Updated with the results of all games through October 1, 2023.
National League

2023 American League record vs. National League Source: MLB Standings
| Team | ARI | ATL | CHC | CIN | COL | LAD | MIA | MIL | NYM | PHI | PIT | SD | SF | STL | WSH |
|---|---|---|---|---|---|---|---|---|---|---|---|---|---|---|---|
| Baltimore | 2–1 | 1–2 | 1–2 | 1–2 | 2–1 | 1–2 | 3–0 | 1–2 | 3–0 | 1–2 | 2–1 | 1–2 | 2–1 | 1–2 | 4–0 |
| Boston | 2–1 | 3–1 | 2–1 | 1–2 | 1–2 | 1–2 | 0–3 | 2–1 | 2–1 | 2–1 | 0–3 | 2–1 | 1–2 | 0–3 | 1–2 |
| Chicago | 1–2 | 2–1 | 1–3 | 2–1 | 1–2 | 1–2 | 1–2 | 0–3 | 1–2 | 1–2 | 1–2 | 0–3 | 1–2 | 1–2 | 1–2 |
| Cleveland | 1–2 | 1–2 | 2–1 | 2–2 | 1–2 | 1–2 | 1–2 | 1–2 | 0–3 | 2–1 | 2–1 | 1–2 | 1–2 | 2–1 | 2–1 |
| Detroit | 0–3 | 1–2 | 1–2 | 1–2 | 2–1 | 1–2 | 1–2 | 2–1 | 3–0 | 0–3 | 2–2 | 1–2 | 3–0 | 2–1 | 1–2 |
| Houston | 3–0 | 3–0 | 3–0 | 0–3 | 3–1 | 1–2 | 2–1 | 1–2 | 2–1 | 1–2 | 2–1 | 2–1 | 1–2 | 2–1 | 2–1 |
| Kansas City | 1–2 | 0–3 | 1–2 | 0–3 | 1–2 | 2–1 | 0–3 | 0–3 | 3–0 | 1–2 | 0–3 | 2–1 | 2–1 | 2–2 | 1–2 |
| Los Angeles | 1–2 | 1–2 | 3–0 | 0–3 | 1–2 | 0–4 | 0–3 | 1–2 | 2–1 | 1–2 | 2–1 | 0–3 | 2–1 | 3–0 | 2–1 |
| Minnesota | 3–0 | 0–3 | 2–1 | 2–1 | 2–1 | 1–2 | 1–2 | 2–2 | 2–1 | 2–1 | 2–1 | 2–1 | 1–2 | 2–1 | 1–2 |
| New York | 2–1 | 0–3 | 1–2 | 3–0 | 1–2 | 2–1 | 1–2 | 1–2 | 2–2 | 2–1 | 2–1 | 2–1 | 2–1 | 1–2 | 1–2 |
| Oakland | 1–2 | 2–1 | 0–3 | 1–2 | 2–1 | 0–3 | 0–3 | 3–0 | 0–3 | 0–3 | 2–1 | 0–3 | 2–2 | 1–2 | 0–3 |
| Seattle | 2–1 | 1–2 | 1–2 | 1–2 | 3–0 | 0–3 | 2–1 | 0–3 | 1–2 | 1–2 | 2–1 | 3–1 | 2–1 | 2–1 | 1–2 |
| Tampa Bay | 2–1 | 1–2 | 1–2 | 2–1 | 3–0 | 2–1 | 3–1 | 2–1 | 1–2 | 0–3 | 3–0 | 1–2 | 2–1 | 1–2 | 3–0 |
| Texas | 1–3 | 1–2 | 1–2 | 0–3 | 3–0 | 1–2 | 3–0 | 0–3 | 2–1 | 3–0 | 2–1 | 0–3 | 2–1 | 2–1 | 1–2 |
| Toronto | 3–0 | 3–0 | 1–2 | 2–1 | 2–1 | 2–1 | 2–1 | 2–1 | 3–0 | 1–3 | 3–0 | 1–2 | 2–1 | 1–2 | 2–1 |

Updated with the results of all games through October 1, 2023.

=== Game log ===
Past games legend
| Astros Win (#bfb) | Astros Loss (#fcc) | Game postponed (#bbb) | Clinched Playoff Berth (#039) | Clinched Division (#090) |
Bold denotes an Astros pitcher

Future Games Legend
| Home Game | Away Game |

2023 Game Log: 90–72 (Home: 39–42; Away: 51–30)
March/April: 15–13 (Home: 7–9; Away: 8–4)

| # | Date | Opponent | Score | Win | Loss | Save | Attendance | Record |
|---|---|---|---|---|---|---|---|---|
| 1 | March 30 | White Sox | L 2–3 | Kendall Graveman (1–0) | **Ryan Pressly** (0–1) | Reynaldo López (1) | 43,032 | 0–1 |
| 2 | March 31 | White Sox | **W** 6–3 | **Seth Martinez** (1–0) | Kendall Graveman (1–1) | **Rafael Montero** (1) | 41,453 | 1–1 |
| 3 | April 1 | White Sox | **W** 6–4 | **Ryne Stanek** (1–0) | Joe Kelly (0–1) | **Héctor Neris** (1) | 37,519 | 2–1 |
| 4 | April 2 | White Sox | L 3–6 | Mike Clevinger (1–0) | **Luis García** (0–1) | — | 42,835 | 2–2 |
| 5 | April 3 | Tigers | L 6–7 (11) | Trey Wingenter (1–0) | **Héctor Neris** (0–1) | Garrett Hill (1) | 29,272 | 2–3 |
| 6 | April 4 | Tigers | L 3–6 | Matt Manning (1–0) | **Framber Valdez** (0–1) | — | 30,613 | 2–4 |
| 7 | April 5 | Tigers | **W** 8–2 | **Cristian Javier** (1–0) | Eduardo Rodríguez (0–2) | — | 37,932 | 3–4 |
| — | April 6 | @ Twins | Postponed (inclement weather); Makeup: April 7. | | | | | |
| 8 | April 7 | @ Twins | L 2–3 (10) | Jorge López (1–0) | **Ryne Stanek** (1–1) | — | 38,465 | 3–5 |
| 9 | April 8 | @ Twins | L 6–9 | Joe Ryan (2–0) | **Seth Martinez** (1–1) | Jhoan Durán (2) | 26,330 | 3–6 |
| 10 | April 9 | @ Twins | **W** 5–1 | **Hunter Brown** (1–0) | Tyler Mahle (1–1) | — | 14,316 | 4–6 |
| 11 | April 10 | @ Pirates | **W** 8–2 | **Framber Valdez** (1–1) | Roansy Contreras (1–1) | — | 10,222 | 5–6 |
| 12 | April 11 | @ Pirates | L 4–7 | David Bednar (1–0) | **Ryan Pressly** (0–2) | — | 9,996 | 5–7 |
| 13 | April 12 | @ Pirates | **W** 7–0 | **José Urquidy** (1–0) | Rich Hill (0–2) | — | 10,064 | 6–7 |
| 14 | April 14 | Rangers | L 2–6 | Martín Pérez (2–1) | **Luis García** (0–2) | — | 39,343 | 6–8 |
| 15 | April 15 | Rangers | **W** 8–2 | **Hunter Brown** (2–0) | Cole Ragans (2–1) | — | 39,257 | 7–8 |
| 16 | April 16 | Rangers | L 1–9 | Brock Burke (1–0) | **Framber Valdez** (1–2) | — | 39,122 | 7–9 |
| 17 | April 17 | Blue Jays | **W** 9–2 | **Cristian Javier** (2–0) | Kevin Gausman (1–2) | — | 30,873 | 8–9 |
| 18 | April 18 | Blue Jays | L 2–4 | Chris Bassitt (2–2) | **José Urquidy** (1–1) | Jordan Romano (7) | 32,602 | 8–10 |
| 19 | April 19 | Blue Jays | **W** 8–1 | **Luis García** (1–2) | José Berríos (1–3) | — | 40,545 | 9–10 |
| 20 | April 21 | @ Braves | **W** 6–4 | **Héctor Neris** (1–1) | A. J. Minter (1–1) | **Ryan Pressly** (1) | 41,397 | 10–10 |
| 21 | April 22 | @ Braves | **W** 6–3 | **Framber Valdez** (2–2) | Kyle Wright (0–1) | **Bryan Abreu** (1) | 42,399 | 11–10 |
| 22 | April 23 | @ Braves | **W** 5–2 | **Héctor Neris** (2–1) | A. J. Minter (1–2) | **Bryan Abreu** (2) | 41,530 | 12–10 |
| 23 | April 24 | @ Rays | L 3–8 | Taj Bradley (3–0) | **José Urquidy** (1–2) | — | 10,611 | 12–11 |
| 24 | April 25 | @ Rays | **W** 5–0 | **Luis García** (2–2) | Drew Rasmussen (3–2) | — | 9,916 | 13–11 |
| 25 | April 26 | @ Rays | **W** 1–0 | **Hunter Brown** (3–0) | Calvin Faucher (0–1) | **Ryan Pressly** (2) | 14,168 | 14–11 |
| 26 | April 28 | Phillies | L 1–3 | Aaron Nola (2–2) | **Framber Valdez** (2–3) | José Alvarado (5) | 40,719 | 14–12 |
| 27 | April 29 | Phillies | L 1–6 | Zack Wheeler (3–1) | **Cristian Javier** (2–1) | — | 41,240 | 14–13 |
| 28 | April 30 | Phillies | **W** 4–3 | **José Urquidy** (2–2) | Bailey Falter (0–5) | **Ryan Pressly** (3) | 41,669 | 15–13 |

May: 17–10 (Home: 8–4; Away: 9–6)

| # | Date | Opponent | Score | Win | Loss | Save | Attendance | Record |
|---|---|---|---|---|---|---|---|---|
| 29 | May 1 | Giants | **W** 7–3 | **Ryne Stanek** (2–1) | Sean Hjelle (1–1) | — | 30,915 | 16–13 |
| 30 | May 2 | Giants | L 0–2 | Anthony DeSclafani (3–1) | **Hunter Brown** (3–1) | Camilo Doval (4) | 31,701 | 16–14 |
| 31 | May 3 | Giants | L 2–4 | Logan Webb (2–5) | **Framber Valdez** (2–4) | Camilo Doval (5) | 40,405 | 16–15 |
| 32 | May 5 | @ Mariners | **W** 6–4 | **Bryan Abreu** (1–0) | Matt Brash (3–3) | **Ryan Pressly** (4) | 32,944 | 17–15 |
| 33 | May 6 | @ Mariners | L 5–7 | Tayler Saucedo (1–0) | **Rafael Montero** (0–1) | — | 40,328 | 17–16 |
| 34 | May 7 | @ Mariners | L 1–3 | Bryce Miller (1–0) | **Brandon Bielak** (0–1) | Justin Topa (1) | 42,277 | 17–17 |
| 35 | May 8 | @ Angels | L 4–6 | Matt Moore (2–1) | **Rafael Montero** (0–2) | Carlos Estévez (8) | 26,064 | 17–18 |
| 36 | May 9 | @ Angels | **W** 3–1 | **Framber Valdez** (3–4) | Shohei Ohtani (4–1) | **Ryan Pressly** (5) | 29,018 | 18–18 |
| 37 | May 10 | @ Angels | **W** 5–4 | **Cristian Javier** (3–1) | Griffin Canning (2–1) | **Ryan Pressly** (6) | 20,420 | 19–18 |
| 38 | May 12 | @ White Sox | **W** 5–1 | **J. P. France** (1–0) | Michael Kopech (1–4) | — | 18,673 | 20–18 |
| 39 | May 13 | @ White Sox | L 1–3 | Joe Kelly (1–1) | **Rafael Montero** (0–3) | Kendall Graveman (2) | 23,242 | 20–19 |
| 40 | May 14 | @ White Sox | **W** 4–3 | **Hunter Brown** (4–1) | Lucas Giolito (2–3) | **Ryan Pressly** (7) | 18,347 | 21–19 |
| 41 | May 15 | Cubs | **W** 6–4 | **Rafael Montero** (1–3) | Michael Fulmer (0–3) | **Héctor Neris** (2) | 35,413 | 22–19 |
| 42 | May 16 | Cubs | **W** 7–3 | **Cristian Javier** (4–1) | Justin Steele (6–1) | — | 34,280 | 23–19 |
| 43 | May 17 | Cubs | **W** 7–6 | **Bryan Abreu** (2–0) | Brandon Hughes (0–2) | — | 35,749 | 24–19 |
| 44 | May 19 | Athletics | **W** 5–1 | **Brandon Bielak** (1–1) | Ken Waldichuk (1–3) | — | 34,931 | 25–19 |
| 45 | May 20 | Athletics | **W** 3–2 | **Héctor Neris** (3–1) | Richard Lovelady (0–2) | **Ryan Pressly** (8) | 35,475 | 26–19 |
| 46 | May 21 | Athletics | **W** 2–0 | **Framber Valdez** (4–4) | James Kaprielian (0–4) | — | 39,820 | 27–19 |
| 47 | May 22 | @ Brewers | **W** 12–2 | **Cristian Javier** (5–1) | Corbin Burnes (4–4) | — | 22,583 | 28–19 |
| 48 | May 23 | @ Brewers | L 0–6 | Colin Rea (1–3) | **J. P. France** (1–1) | — | 23,062 | 28–20 |
| 49 | May 24 | @ Brewers | L 0–4 | Adrian Houser (1–0) | **Brandon Bielak** (1–2) | — | 28,262 | 28–21 |
| 50 | May 26 | @ Athletics | **W** 5–2 | **Hunter Brown** (5–1) | James Kaprielian (0–5) | **Ryan Pressly** (9) | 13,345 | 29–21 |
| 51 | May 27 | @ Athletics | **W** 6–3 | **Framber Valdez** (5–4) | Austin Pruitt (1–2) | **Ryan Pressly** (10) | 9,293 | 30–21 |
| 52 | May 28 | @ Athletics | **W** 10–1 | **Cristian Javier** (6–1) | Luis Medina (0–4) | — | 8,809 | 31–21 |
| 53 | May 29 | Twins | L 5–7 (10) | Jhoan Durán (1–1) | **Bryan Abreu** (2–1) | — | 40,744 | 31–22 |
| 54 | May 30 | Twins | **W** 5–1 | **Brandon Bielak** (2–2) | Joe Ryan (7–2) | — | 34,604 | 32–22 |
| 55 | May 31 | Twins | L 2–8 | Louie Varland (3–1) | **Hunter Brown** (5–2) | — | 37,127 | 32–23 |

June: 13–14 (Home: 7–6; Away: 6–8)

| # | Date | Opponent | Score | Win | Loss | Save | Attendance | Record |
|---|---|---|---|---|---|---|---|---|
| 56 | June 1 | Angels | **W** 5–2 | **Ronel Blanco** (1–0) | Reid Detmers (0–5) | **Ryan Pressly** (11) | 34,037 | 33–23 |
| 57 | June 2 | Angels | **W** 6–2 | **Framber Valdez** (6–4) | Shohei Ohtani (5–2) | — | 38,692 | 34–23 |
| 58 | June 3 | Angels | **W** 9–6 | **Cristian Javier** (7–1) | Patrick Sandoval (3–5) | — | 39,222 | 35–23 |
| 59 | June 4 | Angels | L 1–2 | Chris Devenski (3–0) | **Phil Maton** (0–1) | Carlos Estévez (14) | 40,831 | 35–24 |
| 60 | June 5 | @ Blue Jays | **W** 11–4 | **Brandon Bielak** (3–2) | Alek Manoah (1–7) | — | 23,982 | 36–24 |
| 61 | June 6 | @ Blue Jays | L 1–5 | Kevin Gausman (5–3) | **Hunter Brown** (5–3) | Trevor Richards (1) | 30,079 | 36–25 |
| 62 | June 7 | @ Blue Jays | L 2–3 | Chris Bassitt (7–4) | **Héctor Neris** (3–2) | Jordan Romano (16) | 26,724 | 36–26 |
| 63 | June 8 | @ Blue Jays | L 2–3 | José Berríos (6–4) | **Framber Valdez** (6–5) | Jordan Romano (17) | 28,284 | 36–27 |
| 64 | June 9 | @ Guardians | L 9–10 (14) | Xzavion Curry (3–0) | **Seth Martinez** (1–2) | — | 31,787 | 36–28 |
| 65 | June 10 | @ Guardians | **W** 6–4 | **J. P. France** (2–1) | Triston McKenzie (0–1) | **Ryan Pressly** (12) | 35,087 | 37–28 |
| 66 | June 11 | @ Guardians | L 0–5 | Shane Bieber (5–3) | **Brandon Bielak** (3–3) | — | 26,318 | 37–29 |
| 67 | June 13 | Nationals | **W** 6–1 | **Hunter Brown** (6–3) | Patrick Corbin (4–7) | — | 39,546 | 38–29 |
| 68 | June 14 | Nationals | **W** 5–4 | **Ryan Pressly** (1–2) | Hunter Harvey (2–3) | — | 39,796 | 39–29 |
| 69 | June 15 | Nationals | L 1–4 (10) | Hunter Harvey (3–3) | **Phil Maton** (0–2) | Carl Edwards Jr. (2) | 38,303 | 39–30 |
| 70 | June 16 | Reds | L 1–2 | Andrew Abbott (3–0) | **J. P. France** (2–2) | Alexis Díaz (18) | 38,621 | 39–31 |
| 71 | June 17 | Reds | L 3–10 | Hunter Greene (2–4) | **Brandon Bielak** (3–4) | — | 40,136 | 39–32 |
| 72 | June 18 | Reds | L 7–9 (10) | Ian Gibaut (7–1) | **Seth Martinez** (1–3) | Alex Young (1) | 40,573 | 39–33 |
| 73 | June 19 | Mets | L 1–11 | Max Scherzer (6–2) | **Hunter Brown** (6–4) | — | 33,185 | 39–34 |
| 74 | June 20 | Mets | **W** 4–2 | **Framber Valdez** (7–5) | Justin Verlander (2–4) | **Ryan Pressly** (13) | 34,606 | 40–34 |
| 75 | June 21 | Mets | **W** 10–8 | **Phil Maton** (1–2) | Dominic Leone (1–3) | **Ryan Pressly** (14) | 38,279 | 41–34 |
| 76 | June 23 | @ Dodgers | L 2–3 | Emmet Sheehan (1–0) | **J. P. France** (2–3) | Brusdar Graterol (4) | 49,795 | 41–35 |
| 77 | June 24 | @ Dodgers | L 7–8 | Phil Bickford (2–2) | **Bryan Abreu** (2–2) | Evan Phillips (10) | 49,218 | 41–36 |
| 78 | June 25 | @ Dodgers | **W** 6–5 (11) | **Ryan Pressly** (2–2) | Yency Almonte (3–1) | **Seth Martinez** (1) | 47,273 | 42–36 |
| 79 | June 27 | @ Cardinals | L 2–4 | Jordan Montgomery (5–7) | **Framber Valdez** (7–6) | Jordan Hicks (5) | 41,512 | 42–37 |
| 80 | June 28 | @ Cardinals | **W** 10–7 | **Seth Martinez** (2–3) | Giovanny Gallegos (1–4) | **Ryan Pressly** (15) | 41,452 | 43–37 |
| 81 | June 29 | @ Cardinals | **W** 14–0 | **J. P. France** (3–3) | Adam Wainwright (3–3) | — | 42,504 | 44–37 |
| 82 | June 30 | @ Rangers | **W** 5–3 | **Ronel Blanco** (2–0) | Jon Gray (6–4) | **Ryan Pressly** (16) | 39,174 | 45–37 |

July: 15–10 (Home: 7–6; Away: 8–4)

| # | Date | Opponent | Score | Win | Loss | Save | Attendance | Record |
|---|---|---|---|---|---|---|---|---|
| 83 | July 1 | @ Rangers | L 2–5 | Nathan Eovaldi (10–3) | **Hunter Brown** (6–5) | — | 40,380 | 45–38 |
| 84 | July 2 | @ Rangers | **W** 5–3 | **Héctor Neris** (4–2) | Josh Sborz (4–3) | **Ryan Pressly** (17) | 39,580 | 46–38 |
| 85 | July 3 | @ Rangers | **W** 12–11 | **Bryan Abreu** (3–2) | Will Smith (1–3) | **Ryan Pressly** (18) | 38,936 | 47–38 |
| 86 | July 4 | Rockies | **W** 4–1 | **Brandon Bielak** (4–4) | Kyle Freeland (4–9) | — | 39,533 | 48–38 |
| 87 | July 5 | Rockies | **W** 6–4 | **J. P. France** (4–3) | Chase Anderson (0–4) | **Ryan Pressly** (19) | 36,535 | 49–38 |
| 88 | July 6 | Mariners | L 1–5 | George Kirby (8–7) | **Ronel Blanco** (2–1) | — | 40,562 | 49–39 |
| 89 | July 7 | Mariners | L 1–10 | Luis Castillo (6–6) | **Hunter Brown** (6–6) | — | 34,737 | 49–40 |
| 90 | July 8 | Mariners | **W** 3–2 | **Héctor Neris** (5–2) | Andrés Muñoz (2–2) | **Ryan Pressly** (20) | 37,112 | 50–40 |
| 91 | July 9 | Mariners | L 1–3 | Logan Gilbert (7–5) | **Brandon Bielak** (4–5) | Paul Sewald (17) | 39,421 | 50–41 |
**93rd All-Star Game in Seattle, Washington**
| 92 | July 14 | @ Angels | **W** 7–5 | **Phil Maton** (2–2) | Shohei Ohtani (7–5) | **Ryan Pressly** (21) | 38,850 | 51–41 |
| 93 | July 15 | @ Angels | L 12–13 (10) | Carlos Estévez (3–1) | **Phil Maton** (2–3) | — | 37,523 | 51–42 |
| 94 | July 16 | @ Angels | **W** 9–8 | **Rafael Montero** (2–3) | Jaime Barría (2–5) | **Phil Maton** (1) | 34,679 | 52–42 |
| 95 | July 18 | @ Rockies | L 3–4 | Fernando Abad (1–0) | **Hunter Brown** (6–7) | Justin Lawrence (6) | 43,871 | 52–43 |
| 96 | July 19 | @ Rockies | **W** 4–1 | **Brandon Bielak** (5–5) | Austin Gomber (8–8) | — | 36,937 | 53–43 |
| 97 | July 20 | @ Athletics | **W** 3–1 | **J. P. France** (5–3) | Hogan Harris (2–4) | **Ryan Pressly** (22) | 4,757 | 54–43 |
| 98 | July 21 | @ Athletics | **W** 6–4 | **Framber Valdez** (8–6) | JP Sears (1–7) | **Ryan Pressly** (23) | 6,810 | 55–43 |
| 99 | July 22 | @ Athletics | L 1–4 | Austin Pruitt (2–6) | **Cristian Javier** (7–2) | Trevor May (9) | 14,507 | 55–44 |
| 100 | July 23 | @ Athletics | **W** 3–2 | **Héctor Neris** (6–2) | Chad Smith (1–2) | **Bryan Abreu** (3) | 11,231 | 56–44 |
| 101 | July 24 | Rangers | **W** 10–9 | **Ryan Pressly** (3–2) | Alex Speas (0–2) | — | 37,973 | 57–44 |
| 102 | July 25 | Rangers | **W** 4–3 | **J. P. France** (6–3) | Yerry Rodríguez (0–1) | **Ryan Pressly** (24) | 40,520 | 58–44 |
| 103 | July 26 | Rangers | L 5–13 | Andrew Heaney (7–6) | **Framber Valdez** (8–7) | — | 40,398 | 58–45 |
| 104 | July 28 | Rays | L 3–4 | Colin Poche (8–3) | **Ryan Pressly** (3–3) | Pete Fairbanks (13) | 38,592 | 58–46 |
| 105 | July 29 | Rays | **W** 17–4 | **Hunter Brown** (7–7) | Taj Bradley (5–7) | — | 40,004 | 59–46 |
| 106 | July 30 | Rays | L 2–8 | Zack Littell (1–2) | **Brandon Bielak** (5–6) | — | 40,357 | 59–47 |
| 107 | July 31 | Guardians | **W** 7–3 | **J. P. France** (7–3) | Eli Morgan (4–2) | **Ryan Pressly** (25) | 30,165 | 60–47 |

August: 17–11 (Home: 6–6; Away: 11–5)

| # | Date | Opponent | Score | Win | Loss | Save | Attendance | Record |
|---|---|---|---|---|---|---|---|---|
| 108 | August 1 | Guardians | **W** 2–0 | **Framber Valdez** (9–7) | Gavin Williams (1–3) | — | 33,703 | 61–47 |
| 109 | August 2 | Guardians | **W** 3–2 | **Phil Maton** (3–3) | Nick Sandlin (5–4) | **Ryan Pressly** (26) | 37,522 | 62–47 |
| 110 | August 3 | @ Yankees | L 3–4 | Michael King (3–4) | **Kendall Graveman** (3–5) | Clay Holmes (15) | 44,019 | 62–48 |
| 111 | August 4 | @ Yankees | **W** 7–3 | **Hunter Brown** (8–7) | Luis Severino (2–6) | — | 42,105 | 63–48 |
| 112 | August 5 | @ Yankees | L 1–3 | Ian Hamilton (2–1) | **Justin Verlander** (6–6) | Clay Holmes (16) | 41,411 | 63–49 |
| 113 | August 6 | @ Yankees | **W** 9–7 | **J. P. France** (8–3) | Wandy Peralta (3–2) | **Bryan Abreu** (4) | 46,345 | 64–49 |
| 114 | August 8 | @ Orioles | **W** 7–6 | **Ryne Stanek** (3–1) | Félix Bautista (6–2) | **Ryan Pressly** (27) | 24,761 | 65–49 |
| 115 | August 9 | @ Orioles | **W** 8–2 | **Cristian Javier** (8–2) | Jack Flaherty (8–7) | — | 25,479 | 66–49 |
| 116 | August 10 | @ Orioles | L 4–5 | Dean Kremer (11–4) | **Hunter Brown** (8–8) | Félix Bautista (31) | 22,981 | 66–50 |
| 117 | August 11 | Angels | **W** 11–3 | **Justin Verlander** (7–6) | Reid Detmers (2–9) | — | 41,152 | 67–50 |
| 118 | August 12 | Angels | **W** 11–3 | **J. P. France** (9–3) | Tyler Anderson (5–4) | — | 40,311 | 68–50 |
| 119 | August 13 | Angels | L 1–2 | Chase Silseth (4–1) | **José Urquidy** (2–3) | Carlos Estévez (25) | 40,333 | 68–51 |
| 120 | August 14 | @ Marlins | L 1–5 | Braxton Garrett (7–3) | **Framber Valdez** (9–8) | — | 13,263 | 68–52 |
| 121 | August 15 | @ Marlins | **W** 6–5 | **Hunter Brown** (9–8) | A. J. Puk (5–5) | **Ryan Pressly** (28) | 12,981 | 69–52 |
| 122 | August 16 | @ Marlins | **W** 12–5 | **Justin Verlander** (8–6) | Jesús Luzardo (8–8) | — | 14,795 | 70–52 |
| 123 | August 18 | Mariners | L 0–2 | Bryce Miller (8–4) | **J. P. France** (9–4) | Andrés Muñoz (7) | 38,060 | 70–53 |
| 124 | August 19 | Mariners | L 3–10 | Logan Gilbert (11–5) | **Framber Valdez** (9–9) | — | 38,280 | 70–54 |
| 125 | August 20 | Mariners | L 6–7 | Matt Brash (9–4) | **Hunter Brown** (9–9) | Gabe Speier (1) | 36,642 | 70–55 |
| 126 | August 21 | Red Sox | **W** 9–4 | **Cristian Javier** (9–2) | James Paxton (7–4) | — | 31,590 | 71–55 |
| 127 | August 22 | Red Sox | **W** 7–3 | **Justin Verlander** (9–6) | Tanner Houck (3–7) | — | 33,042 | 72–55 |
| 128 | August 23 | Red Sox | L 5–7 (10) | Nick Pivetta (9–6) | **Kendall Graveman** (3–6) | Josh Winckowski (3) | 37,144 | 72–56 |
| 129 | August 24 | Red Sox | L 1–17 | Brayan Bello (10–7) | **J. P. France** (9–5) | — | 35,323 | 72–57 |
| 130 | August 25 | @ Tigers | L 1–4 | Alex Lange (6–3) | **Ryan Pressly** (3–4) | — | 23,832 | 72–58 |
| 131 | August 26 | @ Tigers | **W** 9–2 | **Hunter Brown** (10–9) | Eduardo Rodríguez (9–7) | — | 27,103 | 73–58 |
| 132 | August 27 | @ Tigers | **W** 17–4 | **Justin Verlander** (10–6) | Alex Faedo (2–5) | — | 28,496 | 74–58 |
| 133 | August 28 | @ Red Sox | **W** 13–5 | **Kendall Graveman** (4–6) | Kyle Barraclough (1–1) | **José Urquidy** (1) | 33,771 | 75–58 |
| 134 | August 29 | @ Red Sox | **W** 6–2 | **J. P. France** (10–5) | Brayan Bello (10–8) | — | 30,267 | 76–58 |
| 135 | August 30 | @ Red Sox | **W** 7–4 | **Framber Valdez** (10–9) | Kutter Crawford (6–7) | **Ryan Pressly** (29) | 31,045 | 77–58 |

September/October: 13–14 (Home: 4–11; Away: 9–3)

| # | Date | Opponent | Score | Win | Loss | Save | Attendance | Record |
|---|---|---|---|---|---|---|---|---|
| 136 | September 1 | Yankees | L 2–6 | Carlos Rodón (2–4) | **Justin Verlander** (10–7) | — | 41,066 | 77–59 |
| 137 | September 2 | Yankees | L 4–5 | Jhony Brito (6–6) | **Hunter Brown** (10–10) | Clay Holmes (17) | 41,427 | 77–60 |
| 138 | September 3 | Yankees | L 1–6 | Michael King (4–5) | **Cristian Javier** (9–3) | — | 41,514 | 77–61 |
| 139 | September 4 | @ Rangers | **W** 13–6 | **Rafael Montero** (5–5) | Josh Sborz (5–7) | — | 39,181 | 78–61 |
| 140 | September 5 | @ Rangers | **W** 14–1 | **Framber Valdez** (11–9) | Nathan Eovaldi (11–4) | — | 33,678 | 79–61 |
| 141 | September 6 | @ Rangers | **W** 12–3 | **Justin Verlander** (11–7) | Max Scherzer (12–6) | — | 36,417 | 80–61 |
| 142 | September 8 | Padres | L 2–11 | Blake Snell (13–9) | **Hunter Brown** (10–11) | — | 39,516 | 80–62 |
| 143 | September 9 | Padres | **W** 7–5 | **Phil Maton** (4–3) | Seth Lugo (6–7) | **Ryan Pressly** (30) | 39,452 | 81–62 |
| 144 | September 10 | Padres | **W** 12–2 | **J. P. France** (11–5) | Matt Waldron (0–3) | — | 41,073 | 82–62 |
| 145 | September 11 | Athletics | L 0–4 | Ken Waldichuk (3–7) | **Framber Valdez** (11–10) | — | 29,807 | 82–63 |
| 146 | September 12 | Athletics | L 2–6 | JP Sears (5–11) | **Justin Verlander** (11–8) | — | 36,504 | 82–64 |
| 147 | September 13 | Athletics | **W** 6–2 | **Hunter Brown** (11–11) | Paul Blackburn (4–5) | — | 37,864 | 83–64 |
| 148 | September 15 | @ Royals | L 2–4 | Ángel Zerpa (2–3) | **Cristian Javier** (9–4) | Taylor Clarke (1) | 15,465 | 83–65 |
| 149 | September 16 | @ Royals | L 8–10 | James McArthur (1–0) | **Héctor Neris** (6–3) | Taylor Clarke (2) | 19,557 | 83–66 |
| 150 | September 17 | @ Royals | **W** 7–1 | **Framber Valdez** (12–10) | Jordan Lyles (4–17) | — | 15,311 | 84–66 |
| 151 | September 18 | Orioles | L 7–8 | Mike Baumann (10–1) | **Ryan Pressly** (3–5) | Yennier Canó (7) | 34,456 | 84–67 |
| 152 | September 19 | Orioles | L 5–9 | DL Hall (3–0) | **Hunter Brown** (11–12) | Cionel Pérez (2) | 35,050 | 84–68 |
| 153 | September 20 | Orioles | **W** 2–1 | **Ryan Pressly** (4–5) | Danny Coulombe (5–2) | — | 36,427 | 85–68 |
| 154 | September 22 | Royals | L 5–7 | Cole Ragans (7–4) | **Framber Valdez** (12–11) | James McArthur (2) | 41,033 | 85–69 |
| 155 | September 23 | Royals | L 2–3 | Jordan Lyles (5–17) | **J. P. France** (11–6) | Taylor Clarke (3) | 41,692 | 85–70 |
| 156 | September 24 | Royals | L 5–6 | Alec Marsh (3–8) | **Hunter Brown** (11–13) | James McArthur (3) | 41,438 | 85–71 |
| 157 | September 25 | @ Mariners | **W** 5–1 | **Justin Verlander** (12–8) | Luis Castillo (14–8) | — | 39,920 | 86–71 |
| 158 | September 26 | @ Mariners | L 2–6 | George Kirby (12–10) | **Cristian Javier** (9–5) | — | 40,035 | 86–72 |
| 159 | September 27 | @ Mariners | **W** 8–3 | **Kendall Graveman** (5–6) | Bryce Miller (8–7) | — | 38,019 | 87–72 |
| 160 | September 29 | @ Diamondbacks | **W** 2–1 | **José Urquidy** (3–3) | Zac Gallen (17–9) | **Ryan Pressly** (31) | 36,133 | 88–72 |
| 161 | September 30 | @ Diamondbacks | **W** 1–0 | **Justin Verlander** (13–8) | Merrill Kelly (12–8) | **Bryan Abreu** (5) | 36,789 | 89–72 |
| 162 | October 1 | @ Diamondbacks | **W** 8–1 | **Cristian Javier** (10–5) | Kyle Nelson (7–4) | — | 30,703 | 90–72 |

== Postseason ==
ALDS

=== American League Division Series (ALDS) ===
The 2023 ALDS was the second postseason meeting between Houston and Minnesota, following the 2020 American League Wild Card Series matchup, which Houston won in a two-game sweep. The Twins' postseason roster featured two former Astros who each represented one of their two prior World Series championships: Carlos Correa (2017), and Christian Vázquez (2022).

2023 American League Division Series versus Minnesota Twins: HOU won, 3–1

Game 1. The opening of the Astros' 2023 postseason featured the Twins assigning Bailey Ober to make his first career postseason start, opposite to Justin Verlander making the 35th of his career, tied for second-most all time. Jose Altuve homered on Ober's first delivery and extended his major league postseason-record eighth leadoff home run and 24th overall. In the bottom of the third inning, Yordan Alvarez hit a two-run home run to bring the Astros' lead to 3–0. In the bottom of the fifth inning, José Abreu singled home Alex Bregman and Chas McCormick then singled home Alvarez to extend the Astros' lead to 5–0. Verlander tossed six shutout innings to post the sixth scoreless start of his postseason career. (Note: Tied Madison Bumgarner and Tom Glavine for the most all time.) Héctor Neris, in relief in the top of the seventh inning, yielded a three-run home to Jorge Polanco and a solo home run to Royce Lewis to shrink the Astros' lead to 5–4. In the bottom of the seventh, Alvarez hit his second home run of the game versus Caleb Thielbar to open the Astros' lead to 6–4. Bryan Abreu and Ryan Pressly, who worked the first five-plus years of his major league career with the Twins, combined for 2 1/3 scoreless innings to finish the game. It was the Astros' 12th consecutive ALDS win at home.

Game 2. The Twins won the second game, 6–2, as Houston starter Framber Valdez faltered and Twins starter Pablo López tossed seven shutouts innings. In the top of the first inning, Correa doubled versus his former teammate to score Polanco. Kyle Farmer hit a two-run home run in the top of the second to extend the Twins' lead to 3–0. In the fifth, Correa singled home two more runs to push the lead to 5–0 and ended Valdez' outing after 4 1/3 innings. In the seventh, Edouard Julien singled home Lewis and the Twins led 6–0. Yordan Alvarez hit his third home run of the series off Brock Stewart in the eighth to give the Astros their only runs of the game. The Twins realized their first victory in ALDS play since 2004; meanwhile, the Astros' 12-game home winning streak in the ALDS was snapped. It was also their first loss in a Game 2 of an LDS since 2015.

Game 3. The Astros opened Game 3 with a four-run inning: José Abreu homered for Houston off Twins starter Sonny Gray and added a two-run home run in the ninth to lead the Astros to a 9–1 win. Alvarez hit his fourth home run in three games and Bregman hit a home run and an RBI single. Astros starter Cristian Javier worked five scoreless innings with nine strikeouts and induced whiffs from Twins batters in 13 of 16 offerings at his slider. Despite walking five and hitting another batter, Javier allowed just one hit. Minnesota batters went 1-for-9 with runners in scoring position and left 9 men on base. Gray, who yielded five runs over four-plus innings and two home runs in this game, was the major league leader in home runs per nine innings allowed (0.391), and had become the eighth pitcher since 2000 to pitch 180 or more innings and allow 8 or fewer home runs.

Alvarez was 6-for-12 with six RBI and 20 total bases in the first three LDS games. Per OptaSTATs, Alvarez joined Reggie Jackson as the only players in history to hit at least four home runs and six extra-base hits within a three-game span of a postseason.

Game 4. José Urquidy started Game 4 for the Astros and delivered 5 2/3 innings with two runs allowed, both on solo home runs, three hits, one walk, and struck out six. Julien hit a leadoff double in the first inning for the Twins but a sharp line drive hit by Polanco was instantly caught by shortstop Jeremy Peña. He dove and tagged out Julien sliding back to second base for the unassisted double play. A critical play by Peña, Lewis, the next batter, followed with a solo home run off Urquidy for a 1–0, rather than a 3–0, lead. In the bottom of the second, Michael Brantley tied the contest 1–1 with a solo home run off Twins starter Joe Ryan. In the fourth inning, Thielbar, in relief of Ryan, yielded a single to Alvarez before allowing a two-run home run to José Abreu, giving the Astros a 3–1 lead. Chris Paddack gave the Twins 2 1/3 hitless innings with four strikeouts as the Twins bullpen kept the Astros hitters from reaching the rest of the game. Neris and Bryan Abreu led the Astros' relief corps with five strikeouts over 2 1/3 hitless innings to hand a 3–2 lead to Ryan Pressly. Pressly struck out the side in the ninth for his second save of the series; he froze Max Kepler with a full-count fastball to end the contest with Correa waiting in the on-deck circle. The win clinched the ALDS for the Astros, advancing them to, and extended their record, seventh-straight American League Championship Series (ALCS) appearance. Correa batted .409 with three doubles and four RBI for the Twins in the ALDS. José Abreu hit three home runs and eight RBI for the Astros.

Game 1, October 7 at Minute Maid Park

October 7, 2023 3:45 pm (CDT) at Minute Maid Park in Houston, Texas
| Team | 1 | 2 | 3 | 4 | 5 | 6 | 7 | 8 | 9 | R | H | E |
|---|---|---|---|---|---|---|---|---|---|---|---|---|
| Minnesota | 0 | 0 | 0 | 0 | 0 | 0 | 4 | 0 | 0 | 4 | 9 | 0 |
| Houston | 1 | 0 | 2 | 0 | 2 | 0 | 1 | 0 | X | 6 | 9 | 0 |
WP: Justin Verlander (1–0) LP: Bailey Ober (0–1) Sv: Ryan Pressly (1); Home runs: MIN: Jorge Polanco (1), Royce Lewis (1); HOU: Jose Altuve (1), Yordan Alvarez 2 (2); Attendance: 43,024; Boxscore

Game 2, October 8 at Minute Maid Park

October 8, 2023 7:03 pm (CDT) at Minute Maid Park in Houston, Texas
| Team | 1 | 2 | 3 | 4 | 5 | 6 | 7 | 8 | 9 | R | H | E |
|---|---|---|---|---|---|---|---|---|---|---|---|---|
| Minnesota | 1 | 2 | 0 | 0 | 2 | 0 | 1 | 0 | 0 | 6 | 10 | 0 |
| Houston | 0 | 0 | 0 | 0 | 0 | 0 | 0 | 2 | 0 | 2 | 7 | 0 |
WP: Pablo López (1–0) LP: Framber Valdez (0–1); Home runs: MIN: Kyle Farmer (1); HOU: Yordan Alvarez (3); Attendance: 43,017; Boxscore

Game 3, October 10 at Target Field

October 10, 2023 3:07 pm (CDT) at Target Field in Minneapolis, Minnesota
| Team | 1 | 2 | 3 | 4 | 5 | 6 | 7 | 8 | 9 | R | H | E |
|---|---|---|---|---|---|---|---|---|---|---|---|---|
| Houston | 4 | 0 | 0 | 0 | 1 | 1 | 0 | 0 | 3 | 9 | 14 | 0 |
| Minnesota | 0 | 0 | 0 | 0 | 0 | 1 | 0 | 0 | 0 | 1 | 3 | 1 |
WP: Cristian Javier (1–0) LP: Sonny Gray (0–1); Home runs: HOU: José Abreu 2 (2), Alex Bregman (1), Yordan Alvarez (4); MIN: None; Attendance: 41,017; Boxscore

Game 4, October 11 at Target Field

October 11, 2023 6:07 pm (CDT) at Target Field in Minneapolis, Minnesota
| Team | 1 | 2 | 3 | 4 | 5 | 6 | 7 | 8 | 9 | R | H | E |
|---|---|---|---|---|---|---|---|---|---|---|---|---|
| Houston | 0 | 1 | 0 | 2 | 0 | 0 | 0 | 0 | 0 | 3 | 5 | 0 |
| Minnesota | 1 | 0 | 0 | 0 | 0 | 1 | 0 | 0 | 0 | 2 | 3 | 0 |
WP: José Urquidy (1–0) LP: Caleb Thielbar (0–1) Sv: Ryan Pressly (2); Home runs: HOU: Michael Brantley (1), José Abreu (3); MIN: Royce Lewis (2), Edouard Julien (1); Attendance: 40,977; Boxscore

ALCS

=== American League Championship Series (ALCS) ===
The 2023 ALCS is the first meeting in the postseason by Houston and Texas.

2023 American League Championship Series versus Texas Rangers: TEX won, 4–3

Game 1. Game 1 was a matchup of Jordan Montgomery for the Rangers and Justin Verlander for the Astros. The Rangers got the scoring started with an Evan Carter double followed by a Jonah Heim RBI single. The Rangers later tacked on the final run of the game with a solo home run by Leody Taveras. Montgomery went 6 1/3 scoreless innings and the Rangers bullpen took care of the Astros from there, handing the Astros a 2–0 loss in the ALCS and a 1–0 deficit in the series.

Game 2. Game 1 featured a matchup of Nathan Eovaldi for the Rangers and Framber Valdez for the Astros. The Rangers scored four times off Valdez (Grossman reached on a fielding error by Valdez, RBI singles by Adolis García, Mitch Garver and Nathaniel Lowe) in the 1st inning and then capped their scoring with a Jonah Heim home run. The Astros got four runs off three homers, two from Yordan Alvarez, Alex Bregman and an RBI double by Michael Brantley capped the scoring for the game as the Rangers took a 2–0 lead in the series with a 5–4 victory.

Game 3. As the series shifted to Arlington for Game 3, the Astros sent out right hander Cristian Javier to the mound, while the Rangers countered with trade deadline acquisition Max Scherzer. The Astros started the scoring with a wild pitch scoring Alvarez followed by a Martín Maldonado RBI single driving in two to make it 3–0. Jose Altuve lead off the 4th inning with his 25th career playoff homer, making it 4–0 Houston and later added an RBI single by Mauricio Dubón to make it 5–0. Scherzer went 4 innings, allowing 5 runs on five hits. Josh Jung got the scoring started for Texas with a 2-run homer and later added another two homer off reliever Héctor Neris. Meanwhile, the Astros got two more runs on an Alvarez 2 RBI single and later added a run with a Jeremy Peña RBI single. The Rangers would get to reliever Bryan Abreu after Adolis García scored Marcus Semien with a single. It was the first run Abreu had allowed since July. Ryan Pressly would walk Mitch Garver to lead off the 9th but retired the next three batters as the Astros won 8–5.

Game 4. Game 4 was a bullpen game, started by José Urquidy of the Astros and Andrew Heaney of the Rangers. The Astros would score 3 in the first, with a 2 RBI triple by Alex Bregman and an RBI single by Yordan Alvarez, which knocked Heaney out after just two thirds of an inning. The Rangers would claw their way back into the game in the 2nd, with a solo homer by Adolis García and an RBI sac fly by Josh Jung. The Rangers would tie it in the 3rd on a Corey Seager opposite field solo home run, which knocked Urquidy out of the game. The Astros would ice the game in the 4th, scoring four runs capped by a José Abreu 3-run homer. The Astros would tack on 3 more runs throughout the game, scoring 2 in the 7th on a Chas McCormick 2-run home run and then another RBI single by Alvarez as the Astros evened the series 2–2 with a 10–3 win over the Rangers. The win also ensured the series would return to Houston for Game 6 and if necessary, Game 7.

Game 5. Game 5 was a rematch between Justin Verlander of the Astros and Jordan Montgomery of the Rangers. The Astros started the scoring in the 1st with a 2 out solo home run by Alex Bregman. The score would remain the same until the fifth, when Nathaniel Lowe hit a 1 out solo home run to left to tie the score at 1–1. The Astros immediately responded in the 6th when José Abreu singled in Alex Bregman to give the Astros the lead again and knock out Montgomery from the game. The Rangers responded in the bottom half of the inning with a 1 out double by Corey Seager, single by Evan Carter and a 3-run home run by Adolis García. 1 out later, Jung singled and knocked Verlander out of the game. The benches would clear in the 8th after Astros reliever Bryan Abreu hit Adolis García, which resulted in Abreu and manager Dusty Baker from the Astros and García from the Rangers being ejected from the game. Jose Altuve hit a go ahead home run in the 9th inning off of Rangers closer José Leclerc, and Ryan Pressly recorded six outs as the Astros won 5–4 and took a 3–2 series lead going back home for Game 6.

Game 6. Game 6 was a rematch between Nathan Eovaldi of the Rangers and Framber Valdez of the Astros. The Astros started the scoring with a 1 out RBI single by Yordan Alvarez to score Jose Altuve. The Rangers immediately responded in the top half of the 2nd as Mitch Garver lead off the inning with a solo homer. The score would remain the same until the top of the 4th, when Jonah Heim hit a 2-run home run to give Texas a 3–1 lead. The Astros would tack on a run in the 6th with a sacrifice fly by Mauricio Dubón to make it 3–2 Rangers. Mitch Garver would add another run with an RBI double that would make it 4–2 Rangers in the 8th. The Rangers would add on with a RBI HBP and grand slam by Adolis García to extend their lead to 9–2 as their bullpen shut the Astros offense down and the Rangers evened the series and forced a winner take all Game 7 with a 4–2 victory.

Game 7. Game 7 was a rematch between Max Scherzer of the Rangers and Cristian Javier of the Astros. The Rangers started the scoring with a 3 run first inning, starting with a 1 out solo home run by Corey Seager and later with RBI singles by Adolis García and Mitch Garver, which knocked Javier out of the game after one third of an inning. The Astros responded in the bottom half of the 1st with an RBI single, but were limited to just the one run in that inning. Adolis García would add a solo homer in the 3rd to make it 4–1 Rangers. The Astros would respond right back in the bottom half of the 3rd with an Alex Bregman solo home run. Carter would double in 2 more runs in the top half of the 4th inning to put the Rangers up 6–2 and Adolis García would continue his tear with a 2 run single making it 8–2 Rangers. The Rangers would add another two runs in the 6th on a Nathaniel Lowe 2-run home run to make it 10–2 Rangers. The Astros would add a run in the 7th on an RBI single by Yordan Alvarez which made it 10–3 Rangers. The Rangers would get that run right back in the 8th with another solo homer by García. Jose Altuve would add a run for Houston in the 9th with a solo home run off of José Leclerc, his 27th career playoff homer, making it 11–4 Rangers. Leclerc would issue a walk but retired the side as the Rangers went on to win the game and the series, ending the Astros season. Just like in the 2019 World Series, which also featured the Astros, the road team won each game in the series.

Game 1, at Minute Maid Park

October 15, 2023 7:16 pm (CDT) at Minute Maid Park in Houston, Texas
| Team | 1 | 2 | 3 | 4 | 5 | 6 | 7 | 8 | 9 | R | H | E |
|---|---|---|---|---|---|---|---|---|---|---|---|---|
| Texas | 0 | 1 | 0 | 0 | 1 | 0 | 0 | 0 | 0 | 2 | 6 | 0 |
| Houston | 0 | 0 | 0 | 0 | 0 | 0 | 0 | 0 | 0 | 0 | 5 | 0 |
WP: Jordan Montgomery (1–0) LP: Justin Verlander (0–1) Sv: José Leclerc (1); Home runs: TEX: Leody Taveras (1); HOU: None; Attendance: 42,872; Boxscore

Game 2, at Minute Maid Park

October 16, 2023 3:39 pm (CDT) at Minute Maid Park in Houston, Texas
| Team | 1 | 2 | 3 | 4 | 5 | 6 | 7 | 8 | 9 | R | H | E |
|---|---|---|---|---|---|---|---|---|---|---|---|---|
| Texas | 4 | 0 | 1 | 0 | 0 | 0 | 0 | 0 | 0 | 5 | 8 | 1 |
| Houston | 0 | 1 | 0 | 1 | 0 | 1 | 0 | 1 | 0 | 4 | 6 | 2 |
WP: Nathan Eovaldi (1–0) LP: Framber Valdez (0–1) Sv: José Leclerc (2); Home runs: TEX: Jonah Heim (1); HOU: Yordan Alvarez 2 (2), Alex Bregman (1); Attendance: 42,879; Boxscore

Game 3, at Globe Life Field

October 18, 2023 7:03 pm (CDT) at Globe Life Field in Arlington, Texas
| Team | 1 | 2 | 3 | 4 | 5 | 6 | 7 | 8 | 9 | R | H | E |
|---|---|---|---|---|---|---|---|---|---|---|---|---|
| Houston | 0 | 3 | 1 | 1 | 0 | 0 | 2 | 1 | 0 | 8 | 12 | 0 |
| Texas | 0 | 0 | 0 | 0 | 2 | 0 | 2 | 1 | 0 | 5 | 6 | 0 |
WP: Cristian Javier (1–0) LP: Max Scherzer (0–1) Sv: Ryan Pressly (1); Home runs: HOU: Jose Altuve (1); TEX: Josh Jung 2 (2); Attendance: 42,368; Boxscore

Game 4, at Globe Life Field

October 19, 2023 7:03 pm (CDT) at Globe Life Field in Arlington, Texas
| Team | 1 | 2 | 3 | 4 | 5 | 6 | 7 | 8 | 9 | R | H | E |
|---|---|---|---|---|---|---|---|---|---|---|---|---|
| Houston | 3 | 0 | 0 | 4 | 0 | 0 | 2 | 1 | 0 | 10 | 11 | 0 |
| Texas | 0 | 2 | 1 | 0 | 0 | 0 | 0 | 0 | 0 | 3 | 8 | 0 |
WP: Ryne Stanek (1–0) LP: Dane Dunning (0–1); Home runs: HOU: José Abreu (1), Chas McCormick (1); TEX: Adolis Garcia (1), Corey Seager (1); Attendance: 42,060; Boxscore

Game 5, at Globe Life Field

October 20, 2023 4:07 pm (CDT) at Globe Life Field in Arlington, Texas
| Team | 1 | 2 | 3 | 4 | 5 | 6 | 7 | 8 | 9 | R | H | E |
|---|---|---|---|---|---|---|---|---|---|---|---|---|
| Houston | 1 | 0 | 0 | 0 | 0 | 1 | 0 | 0 | 3 | 5 | 8 | 0 |
| Texas | 0 | 0 | 0 | 0 | 1 | 3 | 0 | 0 | 0 | 4 | 8 | 1 |
WP: Ryan Pressly (1–0) LP: José Leclerc (0–1); Home runs: HOU: Alex Bregman (2), Jose Altuve (2); TEX: Nathaniel Lowe (1), Adolis Garcia (2); Attendance: 41,519; Boxscore

Game 6, at Minute Maid Park

October 22, 2023 7:04 pm (CDT) at Minute Maid Park in Houston, Texas
| Team | 1 | 2 | 3 | 4 | 5 | 6 | 7 | 8 | 9 | R | H | E |
|---|---|---|---|---|---|---|---|---|---|---|---|---|
| Texas | 0 | 1 | 0 | 2 | 0 | 0 | 0 | 1 | 5 | 9 | 10 | 0 |
| Houston | 1 | 0 | 0 | 0 | 0 | 1 | 0 | 0 | 0 | 2 | 6 | 1 |
WP: Nathan Eovaldi (2–0) LP: Framber Valdez (0–2); Home runs: TEX: Mitch Garver (1), Jonah Heim (2), Adolis García (3); HOU: None; Attendance: 42,368; Boxscore

Game 7, at Minute Maid Park

October 23, 2023 7:06 pm (CDT) at Minute Maid Park in Houston, Texas
| Team | 1 | 2 | 3 | 4 | 5 | 6 | 7 | 8 | 9 | R | H | E |
|---|---|---|---|---|---|---|---|---|---|---|---|---|
| Texas | 3 | 0 | 1 | 4 | 0 | 2 | 0 | 1 | 0 | 11 | 15 | 0 |
| Houston | 1 | 0 | 1 | 0 | 0 | 0 | 1 | 0 | 1 | 4 | 12 | 0 |
WP: Jordan Montgomery (2–0) LP: Cristian Javier (1–1); Home runs: TEX: Corey Seager (2), Adolis García 2 (5), Nathaniel Lowe (2); HOU: Alex Bregman (3), Jose Altuve (3); Attendance: 42,814; Boxscore

=== Game log ===
2023 Postseason Game Log: 6–5 (Home: 1–5; Away: 5–0)
AL Division Series vs Twins: 3–1 (Home: 1–1; Away: 2–0)

| # | Date | Opponent | Score | Win | Loss | Save | Attendance | Record |
|---|---|---|---|---|---|---|---|---|
| 1 | October 7 | Twins | W 6–4 | Justin Verlander (1–0) | Bailey Ober (0–1) | Ryan Pressly (1) | 43,024 | 1–0 |
| 2 | October 8 | Twins | L 2–6 | Pablo López (2–0) | Framber Valdez (0–1) | — | 43,017 | 1–1 |
| 3 | October 10 | @ Twins | W 9–1 | Cristian Javier (1–0) | Sonny Gray (1–1) | — | 41,017 | 2–1 |
| 4 | October 11 | @ Twins | W 3–2 | José Urquidy (1–0) | Caleb Thielbar (0–1) | Ryan Pressly (2) | 40,977 | 3–1 |

AL Championship Series vs Rangers: 3–4 (Home: 0–4; Away: 3–0)

| # | Date | Opponent | Score | Win | Loss | Save | Attendance | Record |
|---|---|---|---|---|---|---|---|---|
| 1 | October 15 | Rangers | L 0–2 | Jordan Montgomery (2–0) | Justin Verlander (1–1) | José Leclerc (2) | 42,872 | 0–1 |
| 2 | October 16 | Rangers | L 4–5 | Nathan Eovaldi (3–0) | Framber Valdez (0–2) | José Leclerc (3) | 42,879 | 0–2 |
| 3 | October 18 | @ Rangers | W 8–5 | Cristian Javier (2–0) | Max Scherzer (0–1) | Ryan Pressly (3) | 42,368 | 1–2 |
| 4 | October 19 | @ Rangers | W 10–3 | Ryne Stanek (1–0) | Dane Dunning (1–1) | — | 42,060 | 2–2 |
| 5 | October 20 | @ Rangers | W 5–4 | Ryan Pressly (1–0) | José Leclerc (0–1) | — | 41,519 | 3–2 |
| 6 | October 22 | Rangers | L 2–9 | Nathan Eovaldi (4–0) | Framber Valdez (0–3) | — | 42,368 | 3–3 |
| 7 | October 23 | Rangers | L 4–11 | Jordan Montgomery (3–0) | Cristian Javier (2–1) | — | 42,814 | 3–4 |

=== Postseason rosters ===
Playoff rosters
American League Division Series

- Pitchers: 35 Justin Verlander 45 Ryne Stanek 47 Rafael Montero 50 Héctor Neris 52 Bryan Abreu 53 Cristian Javier 55 Ryan Pressly 58 Hunter Brown 59 Framber Valdez 65 José Urquidy 68 J. P. France 88 Phil Maton
- Catchers: 15 Martín Maldonado 21 Yainer Díaz
- Infielders: 2 Alex Bregman 3 Jeremy Peña 14 Mauricio Dubón 16 Grae Kessinger 27 Jose Altuve 28 Jon Singleton 79 José Abreu
- Outfielders: 6 Jake Meyers 20 Chas McCormick 23 Michael Brantley 30 Kyle Tucker 44 Yordan Alvarez

American League Championship Series

- Pitchers: 35 Justin Verlander 45 Ryne Stanek 47 Rafael Montero 50 Héctor Neris 52 Bryan Abreu 53 Cristian Javier 55 Ryan Pressly 56 Ronel Blanco 58 Hunter Brown 65 José Urquidy 68 J. P. France 88 Phil Maton
- Catchers: 15 Martín Maldonado 21 Yainer Díaz
- Infielders: 2 Alex Bregman 3 Jeremy Peña 14 Mauricio Dubón 16 Grae Kessinger 27 Jose Altuve 28 Jon Singleton 79 José Abreu
- Outfielders: 20 Chas McCormick 23 Michael Brantley 30 Kyle Tucker 44 Yordan Alvarez

== Roster ==
2023 Houston Astros
Roster
| Pitchers: 52 Bryan Abreu; 64 Brandon Bielak; 56 Ronel Blanco; 58 Hunter Brown; 66 Shawn Dubin; 68 J. P. France; 91 Matt Gage; 77 Luis Garcia; 31 Kendall Graveman; 53 Cristian Javier; 60 Joel Kuhnel; 61 Seth Martinez; 88 Phil Maton; 47 Rafael Montero; 67 Parker Mushinski; 50 Héctor Neris; 55 Ryan Pressly; 62 Bennett Sousa; 45 Ryne Stanek; 65 José Urquidy; 59 Framber Valdez; 35 Justin Verlander | Catchers: 21 Yainer Díaz; 15 Martín Maldonado; 18 César Salazar; Infielders: 79 José Abreu; 27 Jose Altuve; 38 Rylan Bannon; 2 Alex Bregman; 14 Mauricio Dubón; 17 David Hensley; 16 Grae Kessinger; 26 Bligh Madris; 3 Jeremy Peña; 28 Jon Singleton | Outfielders: 44 Yordan Alvarez; 23 Michael Brantley; 9 Corey Julks; 20 Chas McCormick; 6 Jake Meyers; 30 Kyle Tucker | Manager: 12 Dusty Baker; Coaches: 85 Javier Bracamonte (bullpen catcher); 37 Alex Cintrón (hitting); 29 Michael Collins (coach); 19 Joe Espada (bench); 54 Dan Firova (quality control); 41 Jason Kanzler (major league coach); 22 Omar López (first base); 36 Josh Miller (pitching); 95 Bill Murphy (bullpen); 8 Gary Pettis (third base); 46 Troy Snitker (hitting) |

== Player statistics ==
Table legend
| League leader | Team leader | * | Left-handed batter or pitcher |
| League top ten | Leader in appearances at position | # | Switch hitter |

=== Batting ===
Abbreviations

- G — Games played
- AB — At bats
- R — Runs
- H — Hits
- 2B — Doubles
- 3B — Triples
- HR — Home runs
- RBI — Runs batted in
- SB — Stolen bases
- BB — Walks
- AVG — Batting average
- SLG — Slugging percentage

| Player | G | AB | R | H | 2B | 3B | HR | RBI | SB | BB | AVG | SLG |
|---|---|---|---|---|---|---|---|---|---|---|---|---|
| Alex Bregman | 161 | 622 | 103 | 163 | 28 | 4 | 25 | 98 | 3 | 92 | .262 | .441 |
| Jeremy Peña | 150 | 577 | 81 | 152 | 32 | 3 | 10 | 52 | 13 | 43 | .263 | .381 |
| Kyle Tucker* | 157 | 574 | 97 | 163 | 37 | 5 | 29 | 112 | 30 | 80 | .284 | .517 |
| José Abreu | 141 | 540 | 62 | 128 | 23 | 1 | 18 | 90 | 0 | 42 | .237 | .383 |
| Mauricio Dubón | 132 | 467 | 76 | 130 | 26 | 3 | 10 | 46 | 7 | 19 | .278 | .411 |
| Yordan Alvarez* (Note: Rate statistics qualifiers based on hitless at bats and plate appearances without having reached base added to accumulated total) | 114 | 410 | 77 | 120 | 24 | 1 | 31 | 97 | 0 | 69 | .293 | .583 |
| Chas McCormick | 115 | 403 | 59 | 110 | 17 | 2 | 22 | 70 | 19 | 40 | .273 | .489 |
| Martin Maldonado | 116 | 362 | 33 | 69 | 12 | 0 | 15 | 36 | 0 | 30 | .191 | .348 |
| Jose Altuve | 90 | 360 | 76 | 112 | 21 | 2 | 17 | 51 | 14 | 44 | .311 | .522 |
| Yainer Díaz | 104 | 355 | 51 | 100 | 22 | 0 | 23 | 60 | 0 | 11 | .282 | .538 |
| Jake Meyers | 112 | 309 | 42 | 70 | 16 | 1 | 10 | 33 | 5 | 26 | .227 | .382 |
| Corey Julks | 93 | 298 | 35 | 73 | 14 | 0 | 6 | 33 | 15 | 22 | .245 | .352 |
| David Hensley | 30 | 84 | 12 | 10 | 1 | 0 | 1 | 3 | 1 | 10 | .119 | .167 |
| Jon Singleton* | 25 | 62 | 8 | 12 | 2 | 0 | 2 | 10 | 0 | 10 | .194 | .323 |
| Michael Brantley* | 15 | 54 | 7 | 15 | 2 | 0 | 2 | 7 | 0 | 2 | .278 | .426 |
| Grae Kessinger | 26 | 40 | 3 | 8 | 2 | 0 | 1 | 1 | 0 | 8 | .200 | .325 |
| Bligh Madris | 12 | 26 | 4 | 4 | 1 | 0 | 0 | 0 | 0 | 4 | .154 | .192 |
| César Salazar* | 13 | 18 | 1 | 2 | 0 | 0 | 0 | 0 | 0 | 1 | .111 | .111 |
| Rylan Bannon | 2 | 6 | 0 | 0 | 0 | 0 | 0 | 0 | 0 | 0 | .000 | .000 |
| Totals | 162 | 5567 | 827 | 1441 | 280 | 22 | 222 | 799 | 107 | 550 | .259 | .437 |
| Rank in AL | — | 2 | 3 | 2 | 8 | 8 | 5 | 3 | 8 | 4 | 3 | 3 |

=== Pitching ===
Abbreviations

- W — wins
- L — losses
- ERA — earned run average
- G — games pitched
- GS — games started
- SV — saves
- IP — innings pitched
- H — hits allowed
- R — runs allowed
- ER — earned runs allowed
- BB — base on balls allowed
- SO — strikeouts
- WHIP — walks plus hits per inning pitched

| Player | W | L | ERA | G | GS | SV | IP | H | R | ER | BB | SO |
|---|---|---|---|---|---|---|---|---|---|---|---|---|
| Framber Valdez* | 12 | 11 | 3.45 | 31 | 31 | 0 | 198.0 | 166 | 86 | 76 | 57 | 200 |
| Cristian Javier | 10 | 5 | 4.56 | 31 | 31 | 0 | 162.0 | 143 | 85 | 82 | 62 | 159 |
| Hunter Brown | 11 | 13 | 5.09 | 31 | 29 | 0 | 155.2 | 157 | 94 | 88 | 55 | 178 |
| J. P. France | 11 | 6 | 3.83 | 24 | 23 | 0 | 136.1 | 138 | 64 | 58 | 47 | 101 |
| Brandon Bielak | 5 | 6 | 3.83 | 15 | 13 | 0 | 80.0 | 86 | 43 | 34 | 36 | 62 |
| Héctor Neris | 6 | 3 | 1.71 | 71 | 0 | 2 | 68.1 | 41 | 16 | 13 | 31 | 77 |
| Justin Verlander | 7 | 3 | 3.31 | 11 | 11 | 0 | 68.0 | 62 | 27 | 25 | 14 | 63 |
| Rafael Montero | 3 | 3 | 5.08 | 68 | 0 | 1 | 67.1 | 74 | 40 | 38 | 29 | 79 |
| Phil Maton | 4 | 3 | 3.00 | 68 | 0 | 1 | 66.0 | 49 | 27 | 22 | 25 | 74 |
| Ryan Pressly | 4 | 5 | 3.58 | 65 | 0 | 31 | 65.1 | 54 | 33 | 26 | 16 | 74 |
| Bryan Abreu | 3 | 2 | 1.75 | 72 | 0 | 5 | 72.0 | 44 | 17 | 14 | 31 | 100 |
| José Urquidy | 3 | 3 | 5.29 | 16 | 10 | 1 | 63.0 | 65 | 37 | 37 | 25 | 45 |
| Ronel Blanco | 2 | 1 | 4.50 | 17 | 7 | 0 | 52.0 | 49 | 29 | 26 | 28 | 52 |
| Ryne Stanek | 3 | 1 | 4.09 | 55 | 0 | 0 | 50.2 | 42 | 24 | 23 | 21 | 51 |
| Seth Martinez | 2 | 3 | 5.23 | 35 | 0 | 1 | 43.0 | 45 | 29 | 25 | 19 | 45 |
| Luis García | 2 | 2 | 4.00 | 6 | 6 | 0 | 27.0 | 25 | 12 | 12 | 10 | 31 |
| Kendall Graveman | 2 | 2 | 2.42 | 23 | 0 | 0 | 22.1 | 18 | 7 | 6 | 16 | 24 |
| Parker Mushinski | 0 | 0 | 5.52 | 14 | 0 | 0 | 14.2 | 19 | 9 | 9 | 4 | 15 |
| Joel Kuhnel | 0 | 0 | 4.66 | 7 | 0 | 0 | 9.2 | 10 | 5 | 5 | 3 | 3 |
| Shawn Dubin | 0 | 0 | 7.00 | 3 | 1 | 0 | 9.0 | 12 | 7 | 7 | 3 | 11 |
| Matt Gage | 0 | 0 | 2.70 | 5 | 0 | 0 | 6.2 | 6 | 2 | 2 | 3 | 8 |
| Bennett Sousa* | 0 | 0 | 0.00 | 5 | 0 | 0 | 6.1 | 0 | 0 | 0 | 0 | 8 |
| Bligh Madris | 0 | 0 | 9.00 | 1 | 0 | 0 | 1.0 | 1 | 1 | 1 | 1 | 0 |
| Martín Maldonado | 0 | 0 | 36.00 | 1 | 0 | 0 | 1.0 | 5 | 4 | 4 | 1 | 0 |
| Totals | 90 | 72 | 3.94 | 162 | 162 | 42 | 1445.1 | 1312 | 698 | 632 | 537 | 1460 |
| Rank in AL | 3 | 12 | 6 | — | — | 9 | 5 | 5 | 7 | 6 | 11 | 5 |
Other: Complete games—Valdez (2) • Shutouts—Valdez (1) • Sources:

Source:Baseball Reference

== Major League Baseball draft ==
The 2023 MLB First-Year Player draft was held in July 2023, in Seattle, Washington, during the All-Star break to assign amateur baseball players to MLB teams.

The Houston Astros received the 28th selection in the first round, the 22nd (61st overall) in the second round, the 29th (99th overall) in the third round, and final in the fourth and in each of the following rounds. The total bonus pool allotment was valued at $6,747,900, including $2,880,700 for the first round.

Houston Astros 2023 MLB draft selections
| Rd. | Slot | Draftee | Position | School | Origin | Signed | Notes | Bio |
|---|---|---|---|---|---|---|---|---|
| 1 | 28 | Brice Matthews | Shortstop | Nebraska | (Texas) | Y | (Note: MLB debut on July 11, 2025) | |
| 2 | 61 | Alonzo Tredwell | Right-handed pitcher | UCLA • 2023 | (Massachusetts) | Y | | |
| 3 | 99 | Jake Bloss | Right-handed pitcher | Georgetown | (North Carolina) | Y | (Note: MLB debut on June 21, 2024) | |
| 4 | 131 | Cam Fisher | Outfielder | UNC Charlotte | (North Carolina) | Y | | |
| 5 | 164 | Chase Jaworsky | Shortstop | Rock Canyon High School | (Colorado) | Y | | |
| 6 | 194 | Ethan Pecko | Right-handed pitcher | Towson | (Pennsylvania) | Y | (Note: MLB debut on August 19, 2026) | |
| 7 | 224 | Joey Dixon | Right-handed pitcher | Stanford • 2023 | (Utah) | Y | | |
| 8 | 254 | Ryan Johnson | Second baseman | Pepperdine | (Arizona) | Y | | |
| 9 | 284 | Jeron Williams | Shortstop | Toledo | (Ohio) | Y | | |
| 10 | 314 | Austin Deming | Third baseman | Brigham Young • 2023 | (Utah) | Y | | |

== Awards and achievements ==
=== Grand slams ===
| No. | Date | Astros batter | Venue | Opponent | Pitcher | Inn. | Box |
|---|---|---|---|---|---|---|---|
| 1 | April 8, 2023 | Yordan Alvarez | Target Field | Minnesota Twins | Joe Ryan | 3 | |
| 2 | May 22, 2023 | Yordan Alvarez | American Family Field | Milwaukee Brewers | Hoby Milner | 6 | |
| 3 | May 29, 2023 | Jose Altuve | Minute Maid Park | Minnesota Twins | Brock Stewart | 7 | |
| 4 | June 3, 2023 | Alex Bregman | Minute Maid Park | Los Angeles Angels | Jacob Webb | 4 | |
| 5 | June 5, 2023 | Corey Julks | Rogers Centre | Toronto Blue Jays | Alek Manoah | 1 | |
| 6 | June 24, 2023 | Alex Bregman | Dodger Stadium | Los Angeles Dodgers | Bobby Miller | 5 | |
| 7 | June 29, 2023 | Alex Bregman | Busch Stadium | St. Louis Cardinals | Alec Burleson | 9 | |
| 8 | July 3, 2023 | Kyle Tucker | Globe Life Field | Texas Rangers | Martín Pérez | 2 | |
| 9 | August 8, 2023 | Kyle Tucker | Oriole Park at Camden Yards | Baltimore Orioles | Félix Bautista | 9 | |
| 10 | September 6, 2023 | José Abreu | Globe Life Field | Texas Rangers | Max Scherzer | 3 | |

=== No-hit game ===
| Date | Pitcher | IP | BB | BR | K | Pit. | BF | Catcher | Final | Opponent | Venue | Plate umpire | Box |
|---|---|---|---|---|---|---|---|---|---|---|---|---|---|
| August 1, 2023 | Framber Valdez | 9 | 1 | 1 | 9 | 93 | 27 | Martín Maldonado | 2–0 | Cleveland Guardians | Minute Maid Park | Quinn Wolcott | |
| August 1, 2023 | Valdez: Game score: 93 • Win (9–7) | | | | | | | | | | | | |

=== Awards ===
2023 Houston Astros award winners
| Name of award | | | Recipient | Ref. |
|---|---|---|---|---|
| American League (AL) Player of the Month | | September | Yordan Alvarez | |
| American League (AL) Player of the Week | | July 16 | Chas McCormick | |
| American League (AL) Player of the Week | | August 6 | Framber Valdez | |
| American League (AL) Player of the Week | | August 13 | Jose Altuve | |
| American League (AL) Player of the Week | | September 10 | Jose Altuve | |
| American League (AL) Player of the Week | | October 1 | Justin Verlander | |
| Darryl Kile Good Guy Award | | | Jose Altuve | |
| Fred Hartman Award for Long and Meritorious Service to Baseball | | | Dusty Baker (Note: The epitome of the term “Baseball Lifer”, Baker has spent the last 56 years crafting one of the most unique and successful careers the game has ever seen. In his 19 seasons as a Major League player, he was an All-Star, Gold Glove winner, Silver Slugger winner and World Series champion. In 1993, after a stint as a Major League coach, Baker embarked on a managerial career that will undoubtedly land him in Cooperstown in the National Baseball Hall of Fame. In ‘93, Baker took over as manager of the San Francisco Giants, leading that club to 103 victories following a 72–90 season. He would go on to manage five clubs, (Giants, Cubs, Reds, Nationals, Astros) enjoying success at each stop. He is the only manager in Major League history to lead five different teams to division titles. In his 26 seasons as a manager, he has tallied 2,183 wins, which ranks 7th all-time. His most successful stint as a manager is his current one in Houston, where he has led the Astros to postseason berths in all four of his seasons, including three division titles, two AL Pennants and a World Series championship. In addition to his on-field success as a player and manager, Baker is seen as one of the most beloved figures in baseball.) | |
| Gold Glove Award | | Utility player | Mauricio Dubón | |
| Houston Astros | | Most Valuable Player (MVP) | Kyle Tucker | |
| Houston Astros | | Pitcher of the Year | Framber Valdez | |
| Houston Astros | | Rookie of the Year | Yainer Díaz | |
| MLB All-Star Game | | Reserve outfielder | Yordan Alvarez | |
| MLB All-Star Game | | Reserve outfielder | Kyle Tucker | |
| MLB All-Star Game | | Reserve pitcher | Framber Valdez | |
| MLB All-Star Game | | Manager | Dusty Baker | |
| MLB Play of the Week | Running catch (Note: Running catch at warning track in sixth inning with runner on base on May 22 at American Family Field.) | May 30 | Jake Meyers | |
| Silver Slugger Award | | Outfielder | Kyle Tucker | |
| The Sporting News | AL All-Star | Outfielder | Kyle Tucker | |
| Topps All-Star Rookie Team | | Catcher | Yainer Díaz | |

Other awards results

| Name of award | Voting recipient(s) (Team) | Ref. |
|---|---|---|
| AL Cy Young | 1st—Cole (NYY) • 9th—Valdez (HOU) | |
| AL Manager of the Year | 1st—Hyde (BAL) • 5th—Baker (HOU) | |
| AL Most Valuable Player | 1st—Ohtani (LAA) • 5th—Tucker (HOU); Other Astros: 13th—Alvarez • 22nd—Bregman | |
| AL Rookie of the Year | 1st—Henderson (BAL) • 5th—Díaz (HOU) | |
| Heart & Hustle | Winner—Semien (TEX) • Nominee—Tucker (HOU) | |
| Roberto Clemente | Winner—Judge (NYY) • Nominee—Peña (HOU) | |

=== Milestones ===
==== Major League debuts ====
Player—Appeared at position

- Corey Julks, designated hitter
- César Salazar, pinch hitter
- J. P. France, starting pitcher
- Grae Kessinger, third baseman
- Shawn Dubin, relief pitcher
Date and opponent

- March 31 vs Chicago (AL)
- April 2 vs Chicago (AL)
- May 6 at Seattle
- June 7 at Toronto
- June 19 vs New York (NL)
Box

Also:

==== Career achievements ====
| Date | Individual | Position | Quantity | Statistic | Note | Ref. |
|---|---|---|---|---|---|---|
| March 31, 2023 | Corey Julks | Designated hitter | 1st | hit | | |
| April 3, 2023 | Yordan Alvarez | Left fielder | 100th | home run | | |
| April 12, 2023 | Corey Julks | Left fielder | 1st | home run | | |
| April 16, 2023 | César Salazar | Pinch hitter | 1st | hit | | |
| April 23, 2023 | Alex Bregman | Third baseman | 500th | run batted in (RBI) | | |
| May 8, 2023 | David Hensley | Third baseman | 8,000th | home run | All home runs in team history | |
| May 12, 2023 | J. P. France | Starting pitcher | 1st | win | | |
| May 14, 2023 | Yainer Díaz | Designated hitter | 1st | home run | | |
| June 5, 2023 | Corey Julks | Left fielder | 1st | grand slam | | |
| June 13, 2023 | José Abreu | First baseman | 1,500th | hit | | |
| June 13, 2023 | Martín Maldonado | Catcher | 100th | home run | | |
| June 13, 2023 | Jose Altuve | Second baseman | 1,000th | run scored | 344th player | |
| July 3, 2023 | José Abreu | First baseman | 250th | home run | | |
| July 4, 2023 | Grae Kessinger | Shortstop | 1st | home run | | |
| July 21, 2023 | Ryan Pressly | Relief pitcher | 100th | save | | |
| August 5, 2023 | Jose Altuve | Second baseman | 200th | home run | | |
| August 11, 2023 | Justin Verlander | Starting pitcher | 500th | game started | 50th pitcher | |
| August 19, 2023 | Jose Altuve | Second baseman | 2,000th | hit | 292nd player | |
| August 28, 2023 | José Urquidy | Relief pitcher | 1st | save | | |
| September 27, 2023 | Jose Altuve | Second baseman | 400th | double | 197th player | |

== Minor league system ==
=== Teams ===
| Level | Team | League | Manager |
|---|---|---|---|
| AAA | Sugar Land Space Cowboys | Pacific Coast League | Mickey Storey |
| AA | Corpus Christi Hooks | Texas League | Gregorio Petit |
| High-A | Asheville Tourists | South Atlantic League | Nate Shaver |
| Low-A | Fayetteville Woodpeckers | Carolina League | Dickie Joe Thon |
| Rookie | FCL Astros | Florida Complex League | |
| Rookie | DSL Astros | Dominican Summer League | |

=== Awards ===
- All-Star Futures Game: Drew Gilbert, OF
- Houston Astros Minor League Player of the Year: Joey Loperfido
- Houston Astros Minor League Pitcher of the Year: Spencer Arrighetti
- Joe Bauman Home Run Award: Shay Whitcomb

== See also ==
- List of Major League Baseball All-Star Game managers
- List of Major League Baseball annual runs batted in leaders
- List of Major League Baseball game sevens
- List of Major League Baseball franchise postseason streaks
- List of Major League Baseball no-hitters
- List of Major League Baseball players to hit for the cycle
