= 2022 Major League Baseball postseason =

2022 Major League Baseball playoffs

Tournament details
- Dates: October 7 – November 5, 2022
- Teams: 12

Final positions
- Champions: Houston Astros (2nd title)
- Runners-up: Philadelphia Phillies

Tournament statistics
- Most HRs: Three tied (6)
- Most SBs: Kyle Schwarber (PHI) (3)
- Most Ks (as pitcher): Framber Valdez (HOU) & Zack Wheeler (PHI) (33)

Awards
- MVP: Jeremy Peña (HOU)

The 2022 Major League Baseball postseason was the playoff tournament of Major League Baseball (MLB) for the 2022 season. This was the first edition of the postseason since 2012 to have a new format, as it has been expanded to include six teams per league. The top two division winners of the American and National leagues receive first-round byes into the Division Series, and the worst-division winner is the third seed in their respective league. The three Wild Card teams are the fourth, fifth, and sixth seeds. The third seed hosts the sixth seed, and the fourth seed does the same with the fifth seed in the best-of-three Wild Card series. The postseason started on October 7, two days after the end of the regular season.

The Wild Card series winners advanced to face the two best division winners from each league in the best-of-five Division Series with no reseeding (i.e. the 1 seed will face the 4/5 winner and the 2 seed will face the 3/6 winner). The winners of the Division Series (LDS) will then move on to the best-of-seven League Championship Series (LCS) to determine the pennant winners that will face each other in the World Series.

In the American League, the Houston Astros were the first team to clinch a postseason spot, their seventh appearance in the last eight seasons. The New York Yankees also clinched their seventh postseason berth in the past eight years, while the now-Cleveland Guardians clinched their fifth postseason berth in the past seven seasons. The Toronto Blue Jays also returned, as they clinched their second postseason appearance in the past three years. The Tampa Bay Rays returned for the fourth year in a row, and the Seattle Mariners ended two decades of futility by clinching their first postseason berth since 2001, ending what was the longest active postseason drought in Major League Baseball and all of the four major North American sports leagues.

In the National League, the Los Angeles Dodgers became the first team to clinch a postseason spot in MLB overall, marking their tenth straight appearance; this became the longest active postseason appearance streak in the four major North American professional sports leagues after the Pittsburgh Penguins failed to qualify for the 2023 Stanley Cup playoffs. The Dodgers became the first team to make ten straight postseason appearances since the Yankees did so from 1998 to 2007. Joining them were the New York Mets, who clinched their third postseason berth in the past eight years and first overall since 2016, marking the first time since 2015 that both New York City teams appeared in the postseason. The defending World Series champion Atlanta Braves clinched their fifth straight postseason berth, the St. Louis Cardinals clinched their eighth postseason berth in eleven years, the San Diego Padres clinched their second postseason berth in the past three years, and the Philadelphia Phillies clinched their first postseason berth since 2011, ending what was also the longest active postseason drought in the National League. This was the first of four straight appearances for the Phillies.

The Wild Card Series saw three of the lower seeds advance to the next round, while the Division Series saw the top two seeds in the National League win only one game each.

The postseason ended on November 5, with the Astros defeating the Phillies in six games in the World Series. It was the Astros' second championship in franchise history and the latest date for a World Series game on record.

== Playoff seeds ==
Major League Baseball tie-breaking procedures were revised this season to use head-to-head records to break any ties at the end of the regular season without playing tiebreaker games. Under the new format, the two best division winners in terms of record earned a first-round bye into the LDS. The three wild card teams are the fourth, fifth, and sixth seeds respectively, while the third-seeded team hosts the sixth seed, and the fourth-seeded team hosts the fifth seed.

American League teams National League teams

The following teams qualified for the postseason:

=== American League ===
1. Houston Astros – 106–56, AL West champions
2. New York Yankees – 99–63, AL East champions
3. Cleveland Guardians – 92–70, AL Central champions
4. Toronto Blue Jays – 92–70
5. Seattle Mariners – 90–72
6. Tampa Bay Rays – 86–76

=== National League ===
1. Los Angeles Dodgers – 111–51, NL West champions
2. Atlanta Braves – 101–61, NL East champions (10–9 head-to-head vs. NYM)
3. St. Louis Cardinals – 93–69, NL Central champions
4. New York Mets – 101–61 (9–10 head-to-head vs. ATL)
5. San Diego Padres – 89–73
6. Philadelphia Phillies – 87–75

== Playoff bracket ==
Wild Card Series (ALWCS, NLWCS)
4	Toronto	0
5	Seattle	2
3	Cleveland	2
6	Tampa Bay	0
4	NY Mets	1
5	San Diego	2
3	St. Louis	0
6	Philadelphia	2

Division Series (ALDS, NLDS)
1	Houston	3
5	Seattle	0
American League
2	NY Yankees	3
3	Cleveland	2
1	LA Dodgers	1
5	San Diego	3
National League
2	Atlanta	1
6	Philadelphia	3

Championship Series (ALCS, NLCS)
1	Houston	4
2	NY Yankees	0
5	San Diego	1
6	Philadelphia	4

World Series
AL1	Houston	4
NL6	Philadelphia	2

== American League Wild Card Series ==
=== (3) Cleveland Guardians vs. (6) Tampa Bay Rays ===
Cleveland won the series, 2–0.

Game	Date	Score	Location	Time	Attendance
1	October 7	Tampa Bay Rays – 1, Cleveland Guardians – 2	Progressive Field	2:17	30,741
2	October 8	Tampa Bay Rays – 0, Cleveland Guardians – 1 (15)	Progressive Field	4:57	34,971

This was the second postseason meeting between the Rays and Guardians. The only other meeting was in the Wild Card round in 2013, in which the Rays won in a shutout in Cleveland. The Guardians swept the Rays to advance to the ALDS for the first time since 2018.

Shane Bieber pitched seven solid innings as the Guardians took Game 1. Game 2 was a long scoreless affair through fourteen innings, until a walk-off home run by Cleveland’s Oscar González in the bottom of the fifteenth, which completed the sweep for the Guardians.

=== (4) Toronto Blue Jays vs. (5) Seattle Mariners ===
Seattle won the series, 2–0.

Game	Date	Score	Location	Time	Attendance
1	October 7	Seattle Mariners – 4, Toronto Blue Jays – 0	Rogers Centre	3:01	47,402
2	October 8	Seattle Mariners – 10, Toronto Blue Jays – 9	Rogers Centre	4:15	47,156

This was the first postseason meeting between the Mariners and the Blue Jays, the two American League expansion teams of 1977. This was the first postseason series appearance for the Mariners in 21 years, when they won the ALDS over Cleveland Indians (now Cleveland Guardians) in five games, then lost to the eventual AL champion New York Yankees in five games in the ALCS. The Mariners swept the Blue Jays to advance to the ALDS for the first time since 2001.

In Game 1, Luis Castillo pitched seven innings of shutout ball as the Mariners won their first postseason game since 2001. In Game 2, the Blue Jays had an 8–1 lead after five innings, but two four-run innings enabled the Mariners to become just the third team in postseason history to come back from down 7 or more runs in a game (Philadelphia Athletics in 1929, Boston Red Sox in 2008).

Both teams would meet again in the ALCS in 2025, where the Blue Jays returned the favor and defeated the Mariners in seven games after being eight outs away from elimination in Game 7, however they would fall in the World Series.

== National League Wild Card Series ==
=== (3) St. Louis Cardinals vs. (6) Philadelphia Phillies ===
Philadelphia won the series, 2–0.

Game	Date	Score	Location	Time	Attendance
1	October 7	Philadelphia Phillies – 6, St. Louis Cardinals – 3	Busch Stadium	3:27	45,911
2	October 8	Philadelphia Phillies – 2, St. Louis Cardinals – 0	Busch Stadium	3:16	48,515

This was the second postseason meeting between the Cardinals and Phillies. The only other meeting was the NLDS in 2011, which was won by the Cardinals in five games en route to a World Series title. This time the Phillies returned the favor, sweeping the Cardinals to return to the NLDS for the first time since 2011.

In Game 1, the Phillies were down 2–0 in the top of the ninth inning, but went on a 6–1 run to take the lead for good, making an improbable comeback. In Game 2, Bryce Harper and Kyle Schwarber gave the Phillies an early lead they wouldn’t relinquish, and completed the sweep.

This was the Phillies’ first postseason series win since 2010, and marked the third postseason in a row in which the Cardinals were eliminated in the Wild Card round.

=== (4) New York Mets vs. (5) San Diego Padres ===
San Diego won the series, 2–1.

Game	Date	Score	Location	Time	Attendance
1	October 7	San Diego Padres – 7, New York Mets – 1	Citi Field	3:02	41,621
2	October 8	San Diego Padres – 3, New York Mets – 7	Citi Field	4:13	42,156
3	October 9	San Diego Padres – 6, New York Mets – 0	Citi Field	3:04	39,241

The Padres defeated the Mets in three games to advance to the NLDS for the second time in three years.

Yu Darvish pitched seven solid innings as the Padres blew out the Mets in Game 1. In Game 2, Francisco Lindor and Pete Alonso both homered for the Mets as they evened the series. Joe Musgrove pitched seven innings of shutout baseball as the Padres again blew out the Mets in Game 3 to win and advance.

The Mets became the first 100+ win team to be eliminated from the playoffs before reaching the division series since its permanent implementation in 1995.

== American League Division Series ==
=== (1) Houston Astros vs. (5) Seattle Mariners ===
Houston won the series, 3–0.

Game	Date	Score	Location	Time	Attendance
1	October 11	Seattle Mariners – 7, Houston Astros – 8	Minute Maid Park	3:39	41,125
2	October 13	Seattle Mariners – 2, Houston Astros – 4	Minute Maid Park	3:15	41,774
3	October 15	Houston Astros – 1, Seattle Mariners – 0 (18)	T-Mobile Park	6:22	47,690

The Astros swept the Mariners to return to the ALCS for the sixth year in a row.

Despite ending in a sweep, each game of the series was decided by two runs or less. In Game 1, the Mariners held a 7–5 lead going into the bottom of the ninth until Houston's Yordan Alvarez hit a walk-off three-run home run to take Game 1 for the Astros. In Game 2, the Mariners again held a late lead until Alvarez hit a two-run home run to put the Astros in the lead for good. When the series moved to Seattle for Game 3, the game remained scoreless through seventeen innings, setting a new MLB record for the postseason. In the top of the eighteenth, Houston's Jeremy Peña hit a solo home run to give the Astros the lead for good as they completed the sweep.

This was the first time the Mariners had been swept in a postseason series.

=== (2) New York Yankees vs. (3) Cleveland Guardians ===
New York won the series, 3–2.

Game	Date	Score	Location	Time	Attendance
1	October 11	Cleveland Guardians – 1, New York Yankees – 4	Yankee Stadium	2:56	47,807
2	October 14†	Cleveland Guardians – 4, New York Yankees – 2 (10)	Yankee Stadium	4:10	47,535
3	October 15	New York Yankees – 5, Cleveland Guardians – 6	Progressive Field	3:30	36,483
4	October 16	New York Yankees – 4, Cleveland Guardians – 2	Progressive Field	3:02	36,728
5	October 18‡	Cleveland Guardians – 1, New York Yankees – 5	Yankee Stadium	3:11	48,178

† Game 2 was originally scheduled for October 13 at 7:37 pm (EDT) but was postponed to the following day at 1:07 pm due to the forecast of sustained inclement weather.
‡ Game 5 was originally scheduled for October 17 at 7:07 pm (EDT) but was postponed to the following day at 4:07 pm due to rain.

This was the sixth postseason meeting between the Yankees and Guardians (1997, 1998, 2007, 2017, 2020). The Yankees defeated the Guardians in five games to advance to the ALCS for the third time in six years.

Gerrit Cole pitched six solid innings as the Yankees took Game 1. In Game 2, the Yankees took an early lead, but the Guardians rallied with four unanswered runs to even the series, headed to Cleveland after a 10-inning battle. Game 3 was a back-and-forth contest that was won by the Guardians, thanks to a walk-off two-run single from Oscar González. However, their lead would not hold. Cole pitched seven solid innings, and the Yankees' bullpen kept the Guardians’ offense from rallying as the Yankees forced a decisive fifth game back in the Bronx. In Game 5, the Yankees jumped out to a big lead early thanks to home runs from Giancarlo Stanton and Aaron Judge, and didn’t relinquish it as they won 5-1 to advance.

Both teams would meet again in the ALCS in 2024, which the Yankees won in five games before falling in the World Series.

== National League Division Series ==
=== (1) Los Angeles Dodgers vs. (5) San Diego Padres ===
San Diego won the series, 3–1.

Game	Date	Score	Location	Time	Attendance
1	October 11	San Diego Padres – 3, Los Angeles Dodgers – 5	Dodger Stadium	3:21	52,407
2	October 12	San Diego Padres – 5, Los Angeles Dodgers – 3	Dodger Stadium	3:34	53,122
3	October 14	Los Angeles Dodgers – 1, San Diego Padres – 2	Petco Park	3:44	45,137
4	October 15†	Los Angeles Dodgers – 3, San Diego Padres – 5	Petco Park	3:46 (:31 delay)	45,139

† Game 4 was originally scheduled for October 15 at 9:07 pm (EDT) but was postponed to 9:38 pm the same day due to the forecast of sustained inclement weather.

This was the second postseason meeting in the Dodgers–Padres rivalry. The previous meeting in the NLDS in 2020 was won by the Dodgers in a sweep en route to a World Series title. In a significant upset given their regular season win differential, the 89-win Padres defeated the 111-win Dodgers in four games to advance to the NLCS for the first time since 1998.

Trea Turner quickly put the Dodgers in the lead for good with a solo homer in the bottom of the first as they won Game 1. In Game 2, with the score tied after five innings, Jurickson Profar hit an RBI single in the top of the sixth that put the Padres in the lead for good as they evened the series, headed to San Diego. In Game 3, a solo homer from Trent Grisham helped secure a one-run Padres victory. In Game 4, the Dodgers led 3-0 after the top of the seventh, but the Padres put up five unanswered runs in the bottom of the inning to take the lead for good, completing the biggest postseason upset of the divisional era.

With the win, the Padres became the first team since the 1906 Chicago White Sox to win a playoff series against a team that was 22 or more games better. In 2023, MLB.com ranked the Padres’ upset of the Dodgers as the second biggest upset in postseason history, behind only the aforementioned upset by the White Sox in the 1906 World Series. Both teams would meet again in the NLDS in 2024, where the Dodgers returned the favor and defeated the Padres in five games en route to a World Series championship.

=== (2) Atlanta Braves vs. (6) Philadelphia Phillies ===
Philadelphia won the series, 3–1.

Game	Date	Score	Location	Time	Attendance
1	October 11	Philadelphia Phillies – 7, Atlanta Braves – 6	Truist Park	3:48	42,641
2	October 12†	Philadelphia Phillies – 0, Atlanta Braves – 3	Truist Park	2:48 (2:55 delay)	42,735
3	October 14	Atlanta Braves – 1, Philadelphia Phillies – 9	Citizens Bank Park	3:16	45,538
4	October 15	Atlanta Braves – 3, Philadelphia Phillies – 8	Citizens Bank Park	3:18	45,660

† The start for Game 2 was delayed due to rain on October 12. It was originally scheduled to be played at 4:35 pm (EDT) but was delayed to 7:30 pm (EDT) due to the forecast of sustained inclement weather.

This was the second postseason meeting between the Braves and Phillies. They previously met in the NLCS in 1993, which was won by the Phillies in six games before they fell in the World Series that year. The Phillies upset the defending World Series champion Braves in four games to return to the NLCS for the first time since 2010.

The Phillies stole a high-scoring Game 1 on the road in Atlanta. In Game 2, Kyle Wright pitched six solid innings, and the Braves' bullpen kept the Phillies' offense at bay as the Braves won 3–0 to even the series. However, when the series moved to Philadelphia, Bryce Harper and Rhys Hoskins would lead the Phillies to a blowout win in Game 3 with two multiple-run home runs. The Phillies closed out the series in Game 4 with yet another blowout win, thanks to home runs from Harper and Brandon Marsh. Game 4 was also notable for an inside-the-park home run by catcher J. T. Realmuto.

Both teams would meet again in the NLDS the following year, with the same outcome as this series.

== American League Championship Series ==
=== (1) Houston Astros vs. (2) New York Yankees ===
Houston won the series, 4–0.

Game	Date	Score	Location	Time	Attendance
1	October 19	New York Yankees – 2, Houston Astros – 4	Minute Maid Park	3:21	41,487
2	October 20	New York Yankees – 2, Houston Astros – 3	Minute Maid Park	3:16	41,700
3	October 22	Houston Astros – 5, New York Yankees – 0	Yankee Stadium	3:35	47,569
4	October 23†	Houston Astros – 6, New York Yankees – 5	Yankee Stadium	3:37 (1:47 delay)	46,545

† Game 4 was originally scheduled for October 23 at 7:07 pm (EDT) but was postponed to 8:54 pm the same day due to the forecast of sustained inclement weather.

This was the fourth postseason meeting between the Astros and Yankees. The previous three meetings (2015, 2017, 2019) were won by the Astros. This was the sixth straight appearance in the ALCS for the Astros, dating back to 2017. The Astros swept the Yankees to return to the World Series for the fourth time in six years (in the process denying a rematch of the 2009 World Series between the Yankees and Phillies).

Justin Verlander pitched six solid innings as the Astros took Game 1. In Game 2, Alex Bregman gave the Astros all the runs they needed to win with a three-run home run in the bottom of the third as they took a 2–0 series lead heading to the Bronx. Cristian Javier pitched five innings of shutout ball, and the Astros’ bullpen silenced the Yankees’ offense to take a commanding three games to none series lead. The Yankees attempted to avoid a sweep in Game 4 as they led going into the seventh inning; however, it was short-lived as Bregman and Yordan Alvarez both hit RBI singles to put the Astros in the lead for good, securing the pennant.

With the win, the Astros became the first team to beat the Yankees in four consecutive postseason series. The Astros became the fourth team in MLB history to win their first seven postseason games, joining the 1976 Cincinnati Reds, the 2007 Colorado Rockies, and the 2014 Kansas City Royals. Astros rookie Jeremy Peña was named the ALCS MVP. As of 2026, this is the last time the Astros won the AL pennant. The Astros returned to the ALCS the next year, but fell to their in-state foe and eventual World Series champion Texas Rangers in seven games.

This was the first time the Yankees were swept in the ALCS since 2012. The Yankees would return to the ALCS in 2024, and finally won the pennant over the Cleveland Guardians in five games before falling in the World Series.

== National League Championship Series ==
=== (5) San Diego Padres vs. (6) Philadelphia Phillies ===
Philadelphia won the series, 4–1.

Game	Date	Score	Location	Time	Attendance
1	October 18	Philadelphia Phillies – 2, San Diego Padres – 0	Petco Park	2:43	44,826
2	October 19	Philadelphia Phillies – 5, San Diego Padres – 8	Petco Park	3:57	44,607
3	October 21	San Diego Padres – 2, Philadelphia Phillies – 4	Citizens Bank Park	3:23	45,279
4	October 22	San Diego Padres – 6, Philadelphia Phillies – 10	Citizens Bank Park	3:29	45,467
5	October 23	San Diego Padres – 3, Philadelphia Phillies – 4	Citizens Bank Park	3:32	45,485

The Phillies defeated the Padres in five games to return to the World Series for the first time since 2009.

Game 1 was a pitcher’s duel between Philadelphia’s Zack Wheeler and San Diego’s Yu Darvish, which was won by the former as he pitched seven innings of shutout ball as the Phillies shutout the Padres. In Game 2, the Phillies jumped out to a 4-0 lead in the top of the second, but the Padres rallied with eight unanswered runs in part thanks to home runs from Brandon Drury, Manny Machado, and Josh Bell, evening the series headed to Philadelphia. In Game 3, Kyle Schwarber hit his second home run of the series as the Phillies regained the series lead. Game 4 was an offensive shootout between both teams, which was won by the Phillies as Schwarber hit his third homer of the series and Rhys Hoskins homered twice, which gave the Phillies a 3–1 series lead. In Game 5, the Padres led 3-2 after the seventh inning and were six outs away from sending the series back to San Diego, but it was quickly erased by Bryce Harper, who hit a two-run homer in the bottom of the eighth to put the Phillies back in the lead for good, securing the pennant.

With the win, the Phillies became the first sixth-seeded team in MLB history to reach the World Series, due to the new playoff format that started with this postseason. Bryce Harper was named NLCS MVP. The Phillies would return to the NLCS the next year, but were upset by the 84-win Arizona Diamondbacks in seven games after being five innings away from the pennant in Game 7.

During this series, brothers Aaron Nola of the Phillies, and Austin Nola of the Padres became the first pair of brothers to face each other as pitcher and batter in the MLB postseason.

== 2022 World Series ==
=== (AL1) Houston Astros vs. (NL6) Philadelphia Phillies ===
Houston won the series, 4–2.

Game	Date	Score	Location	Time	Attendance
1	October 28	Philadelphia Phillies – 6, Houston Astros – 5 (10)	Minute Maid Park	4:34	42,903
2	October 29	Philadelphia Phillies – 2, Houston Astros – 5	Minute Maid Park	3:18	42,926
3	November 1†	Houston Astros – 0, Philadelphia Phillies – 7	Citizens Bank Park	3:08	45,712
4	November 2	Houston Astros – 5, Philadelphia Phillies – 0^{#}	Citizens Bank Park	3:25	45,693
5	November 3	Houston Astros – 3, Philadelphia Phillies – 2	Citizens Bank Park	3:57	45,693
6	November 5	Philadelphia Phillies – 1, Houston Astros – 4	Minute Maid Park	3:13	42,958

† Game 3, originally scheduled for October 31, was postponed due to the forecast of rain. All games were moved one day to accommodate the postponement.

# - Combined no-hitter by Astros' pitching staff.

This was the second postseason meeting between the Astros and Phillies. When both teams were in the National League, they previously met in a tightly contested NLCS in 1980, which was won by the Phillies in five games en route to their first World Series title. The Astros defeated the Phillies in six games to win their second championship in franchise history, earning a measure of redemption after their scandal-plagued 2017 championship.

In Game 1, the Astros led 5–0 after a three-run homer by Kyle Tucker in the bottom of the third, but the Phillies rallied with six unanswered runs to win in extra innings, capped off by a solo homer by J.T. Realmuto in the top of the tenth. By winning Game 1, the Phillies became the first team since the 2002 Anaheim Angels to overcome a five-run deficit to win a World Series game. In Game 2, Alex Bregman hit a two-run home run to put the Astros up 5–0 again in the fifth inning, but they were able to maintain the lead as the Astros' bullpen held the Phillies to just two runs to even the series headed to Philadelphia. In Game 3, the Phillies blew out the Astros to regain the series lead, and became the fourth team in World Series history to hit five home runs in a single game, joining the 1928 Yankees, 1989 Athletics, and 2017 Astros.

However, their lead would not hold. Game 4 was the most memorable contest of the series. In their Game 4 victory, the Astros made MLB history, as Cristian Javier, Bryan Abreu, Rafael Montero, and Ryan Pressly pitched the first combined no-hitter in World Series history. It was the first World Series no-hitter since Don Larsen's perfect game for the Yankees in the 1956 World Series, and the first postseason no-hitter since 2010, when Roy Halladay threw a no-hitter for the Phillies in Game 1 of the NLDS (which also occurred at the Phillies’ home stadium, Citizens Bank Park).

In Game 5, the Astros held off a late rally by the Phillies to win by one run and take a 3–2 series lead headed back to Houston, giving Justin Verlander his first victory in a World Series game after previously losing six. In Game 6, the Phillies struck first in the top of the sixth, when Kyle Schwarber hit a solo home run. However, the Astros responded in the bottom of the inning, as Yordan Alvarez hit a three-run home run to put the Astros in the lead for good, and then Christian Vázquez hit an RBI single to score Bregman. The Astros then closed out the series in the top of the ninth.

The Astros became the first team to win the World Series at home since the Boston Red Sox in 2013 (The Dodgers won as the home team in 2020, but that was played at a neutral site due to the COVID-19 pandemic). Rookie Jeremy Peña was named World Series MVP.

With the loss, the Phillies' record in the World Series fell to 2–6.

== Notes ==
The Seattle Mariners' last postseason appearance was in 2001.

== Broadcasting ==
=== Television coverage ===
==== United States ====
This was the first year of new seven-year U.S. TV contracts with ESPN, Fox Sports, and TBS.

ESPN was awarded the entire Wild Card round under the new 12-team playoff format. In 2022, six games were aired on ESPN, two on ESPN2, and one on ABC (had all four series extended to the full three games, both ESPN2 and ABC would have also each aired a Game 3). Due to logistical concerns. Especially with the fluctuating placements of teams in the standings during the final games of the regular season, ESPN employed remote production for the NY Mets–San Diego and Toronto–Seattle series. The latter series employed a variant of the "enhanced world feed" model used in the 2020 season, with commentators and other selected staff on-site at Rogers Centre, but using video feeds from the Canadian Sportsnet production.

Fox Sports and TBS' coverage of the Division Series and League Championship Series continued to annually alternate between the leagues, with Fox and TBS airing the National and American Leagues in 2022, respectively. Fox also took over the selected Division Series games that previously aired on MLB Network in the previous contract. Fox's coverage was still split between the Fox broadcast network and FS1, with the latter airing most of its Division Series and League Championship Series games. However, the Fox broadcast network maintained its streak of televising consecutive World Series since 2000.

MLB Network replaced CNN en Español in airing Spanish-language broadcasts of TBS' games.

==== Canada ====
For the first time, Canadian rightsholder Sportsnet – a sibling property to the Toronto Blue Jays under Rogers Communications – was allowed to produce its own broadcast of a Blue Jays postseason series; previously, it was required to simulcast a U.S. or MLB International broadcast.

=== Radio ===
ESPN Radio aired the entire Major League Baseball postseason.

=== Most watched playoff games ===
Rank	Round	Date	Game	Away team	Score	Home team	Network	Viewers (millions)	TV rating
1	World Series	October 28	Game 1	Phillies	6–5 (10)	Astros	Fox	11.68	5.7
2	World Series	November 2	Game 4	Astros	5–0	Phillies	Fox	11.37	6.4
3	World Series	October 29	Game 2	Phillies	2–5	Astros	Fox	10.99	5.3
4	ALCS	October 20	Game 2	Yankees	2–3	Astros	TBS	5.89	3.3
5	NLCS	October 22	Game 4	Padres	6–10	Phillies	Fox	5.74	2.9
6	ALCS	October 19	Game 1	Yankees	2–4	Astros	TBS	5.49	3.1
7	ALDS	October 11	Game 1	Guardians	1–4	Yankees	TBS	5.35	3.1
8	ALDS	October 18	Game 5	Guardians	1–5	Yankees	TBS	4.95	2.8
9	NLCS	October 21	Game 3	Padres	2–4	Phillies	Fox	4.88	2.6
10	NLCS	October 19	Game 2	Phillies	5–8	Padres	Fox	4.84	2.7
