= Harrison Bader =

American baseball player (born 1994)

- Bader with the Twins in 2025

San Francisco Giants – No. 9
- Center fielder
- Born: June 3, 1994 (age 32); Bronxville, New York, U.S.
- Bats: Right Throws: Right

MLB debut
- July 25, 2017, for the St. Louis Cardinals

MLB statistics (through 2026 season)
- Batting average: .244
- Home runs: 93
- Runs batted in: 336
- Stats at Baseball Reference

Teams
- St. Louis Cardinals (2017–2022); New York Yankees (2022–2023); Cincinnati Reds (2023); New York Mets (2024); Minnesota Twins (2025); Philadelphia Phillies (2025); San Francisco Giants (2026–present)

Career highlights and awards
- Gold Glove Award (2021)

Harrison Joseph Bader (born June 3, 1994), nicknamed "Tots", is an American professional baseball center fielder for the San Francisco Giants of Major League Baseball (MLB). He has previously played in MLB for the St. Louis Cardinals, New York Yankees, Cincinnati Reds, New York Mets, Minnesota Twins, and Philadelphia Phillies.

Born and raised in Bronxville, New York, Bader played college baseball for the Florida Gators. The Cardinals selected him in the third round of the 2015 MLB draft, and he made his MLB debut with them in 2017. Bader was their starting center fielder for parts of five seasons, and won a Gold Glove Award in 2021.

The Cardinals traded Bader to the Yankees in 2022. The Reds claimed Bader off of waivers in 2023. After becoming a free agent, Bader signed with the Mets in 2024 and the Twins in 2025. He was traded from the Twins to the Phillies at the 2025 trade deadline. Bader then signed a contract with the Giants for the 2026 season.

== Early life ==
Bader was born in the village of Bronxville, New York. Bader identifies as Jewish. His father, Louis Bader, is Jewish, and his mother, Janice, is Catholic and the daughter of Italian immigrants from Sicily. Both of his parents are from Bensonhurst, Brooklyn, and are lawyers. His mother works at Mosiac Mental Healthwhile his father is the lead counsel for Verizon in New York. He has a younger sister, Sasha. He is a first cousin of Vampire Weekend bassist Chris Baio; a first cousin, once removed, of actor Scott Baio; and the nephew of actor Jimmy Baio.

He started in baseball with his father throwing batting practice to him when Bader was five years old. He played shortstop in the Eastchester Little League as a youth, with his father continuing to throw him batting practice every evening. Bader grew up a fan of the New York Yankees.

Bader attended the Horace Mann School in the Riverdale neighborhood of the Bronx in New York City, and played as a center fielder for the school's baseball team. As a senior, he batted .500 with a .783 slugging percentage. He was named first-team all-region, first-team all-state, first-team all-city, and to the 2012 Rawlings Northeast All-Region First Team. While attending high school, Bader also played for the New York Grays, a travel baseball team.

== College ==
Bader played college baseball for the University of Florida after decommitting from two other schools. In October 2011, Bader committed to the University of Pittsburgh but never signed a letter of intent. He decommitted from Pittsburgh in May 2012 and committed to the University of Maryland without a scholarship. In July 2012, he decommitted from Maryland and accepted a scholarship from Florida.

Bader led the Gators with a .312 batting average in 221 at-bats as a freshman, with 15 stolen bases (10th in the Southeastern Conference), and was named to the All-SEC Freshman Team. In summer 2013, Bader played collegiate summer baseball with the Lakeshore Chinooks of the Northwoods League. While playing for the Chinooks, Bader lived with Craig Counsell and his family at their home in Whitefish Bay, Wisconsin.

As a sophomore with the Gators, he again led the team in batting, with a .337 average (sixth in the Conference) in 169 at-bats, with a .421 on-base percentage (sixth), and was named All-SEC Second Team. In 2014, his sophomore year, Bader was suspended for 19 games after he drove his scooter into a parked truck while he was under the influence of alcohol. After the 2014 season, he played collegiate summer baseball with the Bourne Braves of the Cape Cod Baseball League.

As a junior in 2015, he batted .297/.393/.566 (10th in the Conference) in 256 at-bats with 17 home runs (third), 66 RBIs (third), and 10 hit by pitch (eighth) in 67 games. Bader was named to the All-Tournament Team in the 2015 College World Series after he batted .348 in five games. He was named a second-team All-American by Perfect Game, and a third-team All-American by the National Collegiate Baseball Writers Association (NCBWA).

In his three seasons with the school, Bader became the 11th player in school history to record over 20 home runs, over 100 RBIs, and over 30 steals over his career.

== Professional career ==
=== Minor leagues ===
In the 2015 Major League Baseball draft, the St. Louis Cardinals selected Bader in the third round, with the 100th overall selection. He signed with the Cardinals, receiving a $400,000 signing bonus, and made his professional debut with the State College Spikes of the Class A-Short Season New York–Penn League, hitting two home runs in his first game. The Cardinals promoted Bader to the Peoria Chiefs of the Class A Midwest League (MWL) in July, and for the season with Peoria he was 10th in the league with nine home runs and eighth with a .505 slugging percentage, in 206 at-bats. He was the MWL Player of the Week for August 24–30 after batting .448 in seven games with two home runs, six RBIs, one double, and two triples. In 235 at-bats and 61 total games between State College and Peoria, he batted .311/.368/.523 with 13 doubles, 11 home runs, 32 RBIs, and 17 stolen bases. He was named an MiLB 2015 Organization All Star.

Bader began the 2016 season with the Springfield Cardinals of the Class AA Texas League, with whom his .497 slugging percentage was 9th-highest in the league and his 10 hit by pitch, in 318 at-bats, was second in the league. He had a hit streak in April 2016 that fell one game short of tying the Springfield club record. Bader was named a Texas League mid-season All-Star, and in the All Star Game he collected four hits in five at-bats with a double and a run scored. He was promoted to the Class AAA Memphis Redbirds on July 6. In their 2016 mid-season ranking, Baseball America rated Bader in the top 100 for the first time, at 89th. Bader finished the 2016 season batting a combined .267 with 19 home runs and 58 RBIs in 465 at-bats over 131 games between Memphis and Springfield. MLB Pipeline named him the Cardinals 2016 Minor League Player of the Year, and he was named an MiLB 2016 Organization All Star. After the season, the Cardinals assigned Bader to the Glendale Desert Dogs of the Arizona Fall League (AFL), for whom he batted .304/.349/.430 with 16 RBIs (5th in the league) in 79 at-bats. He was named an AFL 2016 Rising Star, and to the AFL 2016 All-Prospect Team.

Bader began 2017 back with Memphis, batting .283/.347/.469 with 74 runs and 20 home runs (both second among Cardinals minor leaguers), 55 RBIs, and 15 stolen bases in 431 at-bats while playing primarily center field. He was ranked the #8 prospect in the Cardinals organization by Baseball America. After the season, the Cardinals named Bader their 2017 Minor League Player of the Year.

=== St. Louis Cardinals (2017–2022) ===
==== 2017 season ====
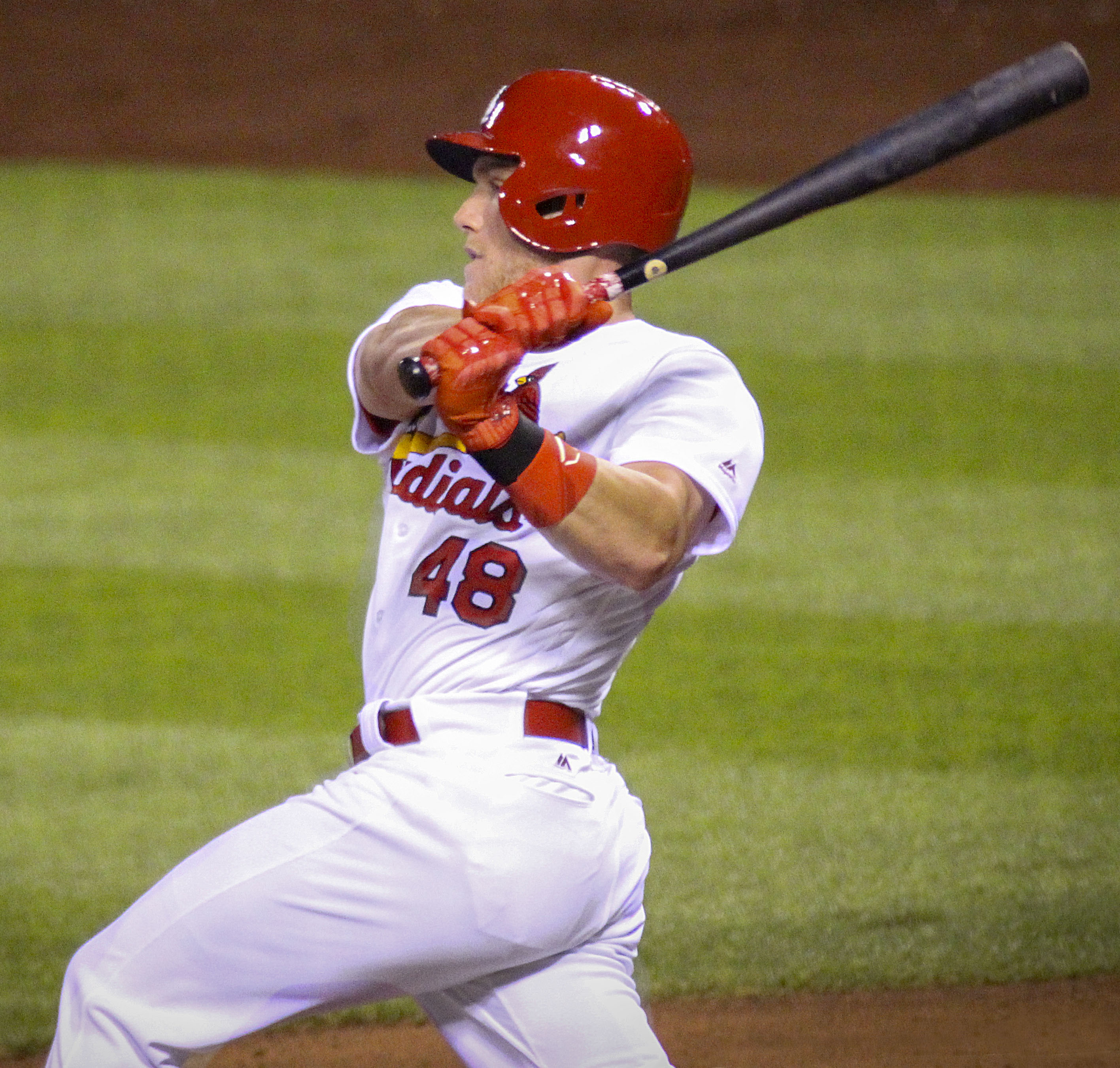
Bader getting his first MLB hit on July 25, 2017

On July 25, 2017, the Cardinals promoted Bader to the major leagues to take the place of the injured Dexter Fowler. Bader had been batting .297 with 19 home runs and 48 RBIs in 97 games at Memphis before his promotion. That night, he started in center field and batted seventh, and recorded his first major league hit, a double, and scored the winning run on a walk-off sacrifice fly against the Colorado Rockies. He hit his first MLB home run, a 395-foot shot to left field, on September 1, 2017, off Johnny Cueto, leading the Cardinals to an 11–6 win over the San Francisco Giants at AT&T Park. In 2017, in which he had 85 at-bats for the Cardinals, his sprint speed was 30.0 feet/second, 10th-fastest of all major leaguers with 25 or more competitive runs.

==== 2018 season ====
MLB.com ranked Bader as the Cardinals’ 5th-best prospect going into the 2018 season, which he began with Memphis. The Cardinals promoted him to the major leagues on April 3, after an injury to Jedd Gyorko. After his call-up, Bader first became St. Louis' fourth outfielder, then their starting center fielder after Tommy Pham was traded on July 31. He scored from second base on an infield single by Austin Gomber at Colorado on August 26; at the end of the season, he was the Cardinals' MLBPAA Heart & Hustle Award nominee.

Bader finished his 2018 rookie campaign batting .264/.334/.422 with 12 home runs, 37 RBIs, and 15 stolen bases (while being caught 3 times) in 138 games. His stolen base percentage of 83.3% was the 4th-best in the NL. His sprint speed was 30.1 feet/second, second-fastest (behind Adam Engel) of all major leaguers with 100 or more competitive runs. On defense, he ranked 4th among MLB outfielders with 19 Defensive Runs Saved. He led the major leagues in 5-star catches (7), and was tied for first in Outs Above Average (21) according to Statcast.

Among National League rookie leaders, Bader was in the top five in runs (61; fourth), doubles (20; fifth), home runs (12; fifth), and extra base hits (34; fifth). On defense, he tied for the National League lead among rookies with eight outfield assists. His 15 stolen bases as a rookie were the most by a Cardinal since Kolten Wong in 2014, and his 100 hits were the most since Colby Rasmus in 2009. Bader was named to the Baseball America 2018 All-Star Rookie Team and the Topps 2018 All-Star Rookie Team, and came in 6th in the voting for NL Rookie of the Year.

==== 2019 season ====
Bader began 2019 as St. Louis' starting center fielder. However, he struggled at the plate, and was eventually moved into a bench role. On July 30, he was demoted to Memphis after slashing .195/.309/.648 with six home runs and 19 RBIs over 90 games. With Memphis he played in 16 games, batting .317/.427/.698 in 63 at-bats with seven home runs and 15 RBIs, and 3-for-3 in stolen bases. He was recalled to St. Louis on August 20. In his first game after being called back up, Bader hit a triple, scored two runs, and walked three times in a 9–4 win over the Milwaukee Brewers.

Bader finished the 2019 regular season with St. Louis, batting .205/.314/.366 with 12 home runs, 39 RBIs, 11 stolen bases, and 13 hit by pitches over 128 games. He was one of eight major league players to record double-digit totals in home runs, stolen bases, and hit by pitches. His sprint speed was 29.5 feet/second, 11th-fastest of all major leaguers with 100 or more competitive runs.

On defense, he again had eight outfield assists (2nd among NL outfielders), and led National League outfielders with four double plays, the most by a Cardinals outfielder since Jim Edmonds had five in 2003, as Bader played all 122 games in center field. His .956 zone rating was the highest by a Cardinals outfielder since the category was first tracked in 1987. He was named the "Best Defensive Outfielder" in the National League in Baseball America's 2019 Best Tools survey of managers, coaches, scouts, and executives. He also received his first nomination and was a finalist for a Rawlings Gold Glove.

==== 2020 season ====
Bader returned as the starting center fielder in the COVID-19 pandemic-shortened 2020 season, slashing .226/.336/.443 with two triples (10th in the NL), four home runs, and 11 RBIs over 50 games. His 29.5 feet/second sprint speed was seventh-fastest in major league baseball, of all players with 25 or more competitive runs. On defense, he had two assists (fifth among NL center fielders), and a zone rating of .974 (second among NL outfielders).

==== 2021 season: Gold Glove Award ====
During spring training 2021, Bader strained his right forearm and missed the start of the regular season. He returned to play on April 30, but fractured a rib while diving for a ball in a May 26 game against the Chicago White Sox. Reactivated and returned to the starting lineup on July 1, he hit his first career grand slam, helping the Cardinals to a 9–3 win over the Rockies at Coors Field. Bader was named the National League Player of the Week for the first time on September 27. The prior week he had batted 15-for-29, hitting .517/.548/ 1.000, with 10 runs and three home runs in eight games, and helped the Cardinals win a franchise-record 17th consecutive game. In October 2021, Will Leitch wrote for MLB: "Bader is a defensive dynamo, a base-running terror and a complete joy to watch. Who's more fun than this?"

Bader finished the 2021 season with 367 at-bats over 103 games, slashing .267/.324/.460 with 16 home runs, 50 RBIs, 21 doubles, nine stolen bases, and 6 intentional walks (8th in the NL). His sprint speed of 29.5 feet/second was 6th-fastest in major league baseball, of all players with 100 or more competitive runs.

On defense, Bader's .973 zone rating was the highest by any major league outfielder since the category began being tracked in 1987. He led major league baseball outfielders in SABR defensive index (14.4), ultimate zone rating (11.4), putouts/9 innings (2.93), range factor/9 (2.97), and zone rating (.973). He led NL outfielders in outs above average (13) and runs prevented (12), and was 3rd in defensive runs saved (15).

Bader won the Gold Glove Award in center field, one of five Cardinals (an MLB record) to win the award. He was the first Cardinals center fielder to win a Gold Glove since Jim Edmonds in 2000–05.

==== 2022 season ====
On April 3, 2022, Bader and the Cardinals agreed to a two-year, $10.4 million contract with an additional $2.25 million in incentives to avoid arbitration. He hit an inside-the-park home run on May 10, the first by a Cardinal since Vince Coleman in 1985, and the only one by a Cardinal in Busch Stadium III. On June 27, the Cardinals put Bader on the 10-day injured list due to plantar fasciitis in his right foot.

At the time of his trade he was batting .256/.303/.370 with five home runs in 246 at-bats, with 15 stolen bases (fifth in the NL) in 17 attempts, and had been error-less in center field.

=== New York Yankees (2022–2023) ===
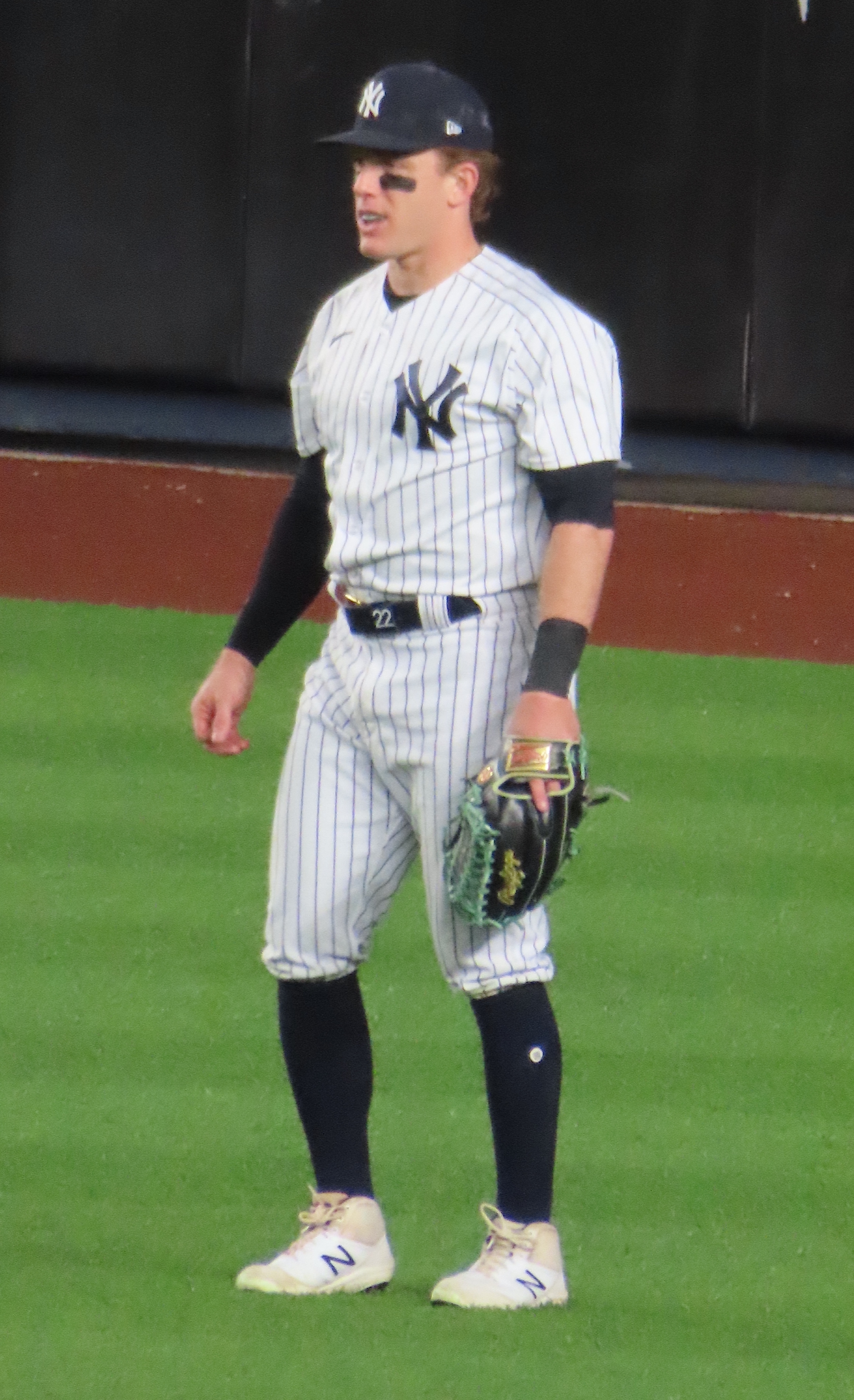
Bader with the Yankees in 2023

On August 2, 2022, the Cardinals traded Bader and a player to be named later or cash considerations to the New York Yankees for pitcher Jordan Montgomery. Bader remained on the injured list until his activation on September 20.

Bader hit his first New York Yankees home run in Game 1 of the 2022 American League Division Series off of Cal Quantrill of the Cleveland Guardians. He hit three home runs in the first four games of the series, joining Bernie Williams and Mickey Mantle as the only Yankee center fielders with three homers in a single postseason. He hit a fourth postseason home run in the first game of the 2022 American League Championship Series, becoming the first Yankee ever to hit four home runs in his first six postseason games. In the ALCS he hit a fifth home run in the fourth game, and batted .400/.471/.800 for the series. He was the fourth Yankee in franchise history to hit at least five home runs in a single postseason, joining Giancarlo Stanton (6 in 2020), Alex Rodriguez (6 in 2009), Bernie Williams (6 in 1996), and Reggie Jackson (5 in 1977), and was the first Yankee in franchise history to hit at least 4 home runs in his first six postseason games with the Yankees.

Though Bader committed to play for Team Israel in the 2023 World Baseball Classic, he withdrew from the tournament due to a left oblique muscle injury that he suffered early in spring training. He said he would “absolutely consider” playing for Team Israel in the future.

He also missed the beginning of the 2023 season because of the injury. Bader's first game back was on May 2 against the Cleveland Guardians. He then hit safely in four of five games. He continued his hot streak against the Tampa Bay Rays, which included two home runs and 7 RBIs in 11 plate appearances. He was just a double shy of hitting for the cycle with three hits that included a single, a triple, and a two-run home run.

In 84 games for the team in 2023, while playing center field (where his 2.77 range factor/9 innings was second-best among outfielders in the AL) he batted .240/.278/.365 in 288 at bats with 40 runs, 7 home runs, 37 RBIs, and 17 stolen bases in 19 attempts (his 89.47% stolen base percentage was 6th-best in the AL). On August 29, Bader was placed on waivers by the Yankees.

=== Cincinnati Reds (2023) ===
On August 31, 2023, Bader was claimed off waivers by the Cincinnati Reds. He missed the last two weeks of the season with a sports hernia and right adductor muscle strain that resulted in surgery on September 29. In 2023 with the Reds, while playing 12 games in center field, he had five hits and three steals in 31 at bats. He became a free agent following the season.

Bader posted 66 Outs Above Average from 2018 to 2023, best among MLB outfielders.

=== New York Mets (2024) ===
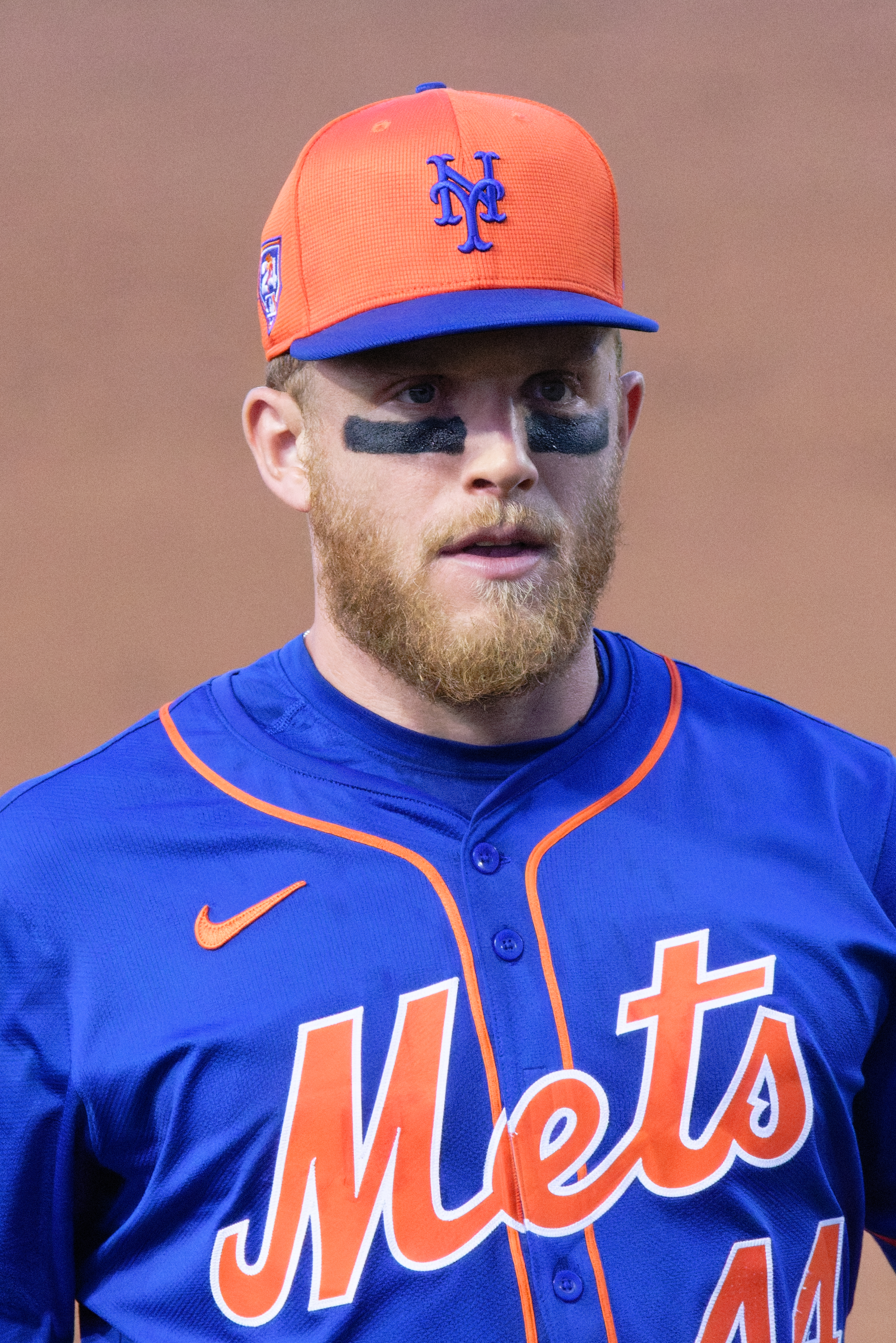
Bader with the Mets in 2024

On January 5, 2024, Bader signed a one-year, $10.5 million contract with the New York Mets. Mets manager Carlos Mendoza said that when Bader played in a game, he would play center field.

In 2024, Bader batted .236/.284/.373 in 402 at-bats, with 57 runs, 12 home runs, 51 RBI, and 17 stolen bases while playing 140 games in center field.

=== Minnesota Twins (2025) ===
On February 7, 2025, Bader signed a one-year, $6.25 million contract with the Minnesota Twins, with up to $2 million in additional bonuses and a $10 million mutual option for 2026. For the Twins in 2025, before he was traded he batted .258 (third-best on the team) /.338/.439 with 12 home runs and 10 stolen bases (second-best on the team) in 271 at-bats.

=== Philadelphia Phillies (2025) ===
On July 31, 2025, the Twins traded Bader to the Philadelphia Phillies in exchange for Hendry Méndez and Geremy Villoria. In 50 appearances for the Phillies, he batted .305/.361/.463 with five home runs and 16 RBI. On November 4, Bader declined his 2026 option with the Phillies and became a free agent.

=== San Francisco Giants (2026–present) ===
On January 30, 2026, Bader signed a two-year, $20.5 million contract with the San Francisco Giants. He made his Giants debut in the team's opening game on March 30, hitting a solo home run in the third inning as the Giants defeated the San Diego Padres. On April 15, Bader was placed on the 10-day injured list with a left hamstring strain, an issue he had been dealing with since Spring Training. He was activated off the injured list on May 11 and returned to the active roster. On May 30, Bader was placed on the 10-day injured list for the second time in 2026, this time with left plantar fasciitis.

On July 29, Bader was ruled out for the rest of the 2026 season after he underwent an MRI scan on his left foot. His foot had been irritated after he was involved in a scooter crash the previous weekend in San Francisco's Marina District, after which he was "transported to a local hospital for non-life-threatening injuries". (Note: It is unclear whether the scooter accident occurred on Saturday, July 25 or Sunday, July 26. A report released by the Giants said that Bader "had a scooter accident on Saturday night/early Sunday morning". Shayna Rubin of the San Francisco Chronicle reported that the crash had occurred at approximately 2 a.m. on Sunday morning.) According to a statement released by the Giants on July 28, the accident "changed the nature of [Bader's] evaluation", requiring further treatment. On July 30, Giants manager Tony Vitello announced that Bader would miss the remainder of the 2026 season. Bader played a total of 30 games for the Giants in 2026, batting .170 with five home runs and 14 RBI. On August 1, the Giants placed Bader on the restricted list and suspended his salary until he was physically able to perform again.

== International career ==
In April 2025, Bader said that he intended to play for Team Israel in the 2026 World Baseball Classic. He had planned to play for Team Israel in the 2023 World Baseball Classic, but was unable to as he was injured.

== Personal life ==
Bader appeared with his cousin, Chris Baio, and Vampire Weekend in the band's 2008 video for their single, "Oxford Comma".

While with the Cardinals, Bader partnered with Sonic Drive-In to sell "Bader Tots" at participating St. Louis area locations. In 2018, a young fan had given Bader a tater tot, and during the Players Weekend his baseball jersey read “TOTS.”

In 2024, he played while wearing a "Bring Them Home" dog tag necklace, a symbol of the movement to free the Israeli hostages kidnapped in the 2023 Hamas-led attack on Israel who were being held in Gaza. He also wore a Star of David sewn on his belt.

== See also ==
- List of Jewish Major League Baseball players
- List of Jews in Sports
