= Jeremy Peña =

Dominican baseball player (born 1997)

- Peña with the Houston Astros in 2025

Houston Astros – No. 3
- Shortstop
- Born: September 22, 1997 (age 29); Santo Domingo, Dominican Republic
- Bats: Right Throws: Right

MLB debut
- April 7, 2022, for the Houston Astros

MLB statistics (through 2026 season)
- Batting average: .272
- Home runs: 86
- Runs batted in: 303
- Stats at Baseball Reference

Teams
- Houston Astros (2022–present)

Career highlights and awards
- All-Star (2025); World Series champion (2022); World Series MVP (2022); ALCS MVP (2022); Gold Glove Award (2022)

Jeremy Joan Peña (born September 22, 1997) is a Dominican professional baseball shortstop for the Houston Astros of Major League Baseball (MLB). He attended the University of Maine and played college baseball for the Black Bears. The Astros selected Peña in the third round of the 2018 MLB draft, and he made his MLB debut in 2022.

In 2022, Peña became the first rookie shortstop to win a Gold Glove Award and the first to hit a home run in the World Series. During the Astros' 2022 championship run, Peña was named Most Valuable Player (MVP) of both the American League Championship Series (ALCS) and World Series (WS), becoming the first American League (AL) player to earn both awards in the same year. He was the youngest position player to win the World Series MVP award. In 2025, Peña was named to his first All-Star game.

== Early life and amateur career ==
Jeremy Peña was born and raised in Santo Domingo, Dominican Republic, before he and his family moved to Providence, Rhode Island, when he was nine years old. His father, Gerónimo, is a former infielder in Major League Baseball (MLB) who played for the St. Louis Cardinals and Cleveland Indians from 1990 to 1996. Jeremy attended Classical High School in Providence, playing baseball and running track and cross country. In 2014, his junior year, he batted .352. As a senior in 2015, he hit .390 with two home runs. Following his senior year, he was selected by the Atlanta Braves in the 39th round of the 2015 MLB draft, but he did not sign. Instead, he enrolled with the University of Maine where he played college baseball.

As a freshman at Maine in 2016, Peña started and played in 55 games, batting .283 with one home run, 15 runs batted in (RBIs), and 11 stolen bases, earning a spot on the America East Conference All-Rookie Team. That summer, he played in the New England Collegiate Baseball League with the Plymouth Pilgrims. In 2017, Peña's sophomore year, he started 54 games and hit .319 with six home runs and 32 RBIs. Following the season, he played in the Cape Cod Baseball League with the Chatham Anglers, earning All-Star honors. In 2018, as a junior, he once again started 54 games, hitting .308/.393/.469 with five home runs, 28 RBIs, and ten stolen bases, earning American East Second-Team honors.

== Professional career ==
=== Minor leagues ===
The Houston Astros selected Peña in the third round of the 2018 MLB draft. Peña signed with Houston and made his professional debut with the Tri-City ValleyCats of the Class A Short Season New York-Penn League, batting .250 with one home run and ten RBIs over 36 games, earning All-Star honors. In 2019, Peña began the year with the Quad Cities River Bandits of the Class A Midwest League, with whom he was named an All-Star, before being promoted to the Fayetteville Woodpeckers of the Class A-Advanced Carolina League in June. Over 109 games between the two teams, he slashed .303/.385/.440 with seven home runs, 54 RBIs, and 20 stolen bases. After the season, he played in the Arizona Fall League with the Peoria Javelinas.

Peña did not play a minor league game in 2020 due to the cancellation of the minor league season as a response to the COVID-19 pandemic. On April 21, 2021, it was announced that Peña would undergo surgery on his left wrist, causing him to miss part of the season. He was activated off the injured list in late August, and was assigned to the Sugar Land Skeeters of the Triple-A West. Over 30 games, he slashed .287/.346/.598 with ten home runs and 19 RBIs.

Upon conclusion of the 2021–22 Dominican Professional Baseball League season, Peña was awarded a second consecutive Gold Glove at shortstop. In 30 games, he produced a .970 fielding percentage, 5.7 range factor, and nine double plays turned along with five errors.

=== Houston Astros ===
==== 2022: Gold Glove Award, ALCS MVP, and World Series MVP ====
On November 19, 2021, the Astros selected Peña's contract and added him to their 40-man roster. Following the departure of incumbent shortstop Carlos Correa via free agency, Peña was named starting shortstop during 2022 spring training. He made his major league debut on Opening Day versus the Los Angeles Angels. On April 8, 2022, Peña hit his first major league home run while his parents were being interviewed during the broadcast. On April 24, he hit his first career walk-off home run in the bottom of the 10th inning versus the Toronto Blue Jays, helping lead the Astros to an 8–7 win. On May 17, Peña hit the third of five Astros home runs in the second inning versus starter Nathan Eovaldi of the Boston Red Sox, tying the major league record for home runs hit by a team in one inning as the Astros rolled to a 13–4 victory.

On June 13, 2022, Peña sustained a left thumb injury versus the Texas Rangers and was placed on the 10-day injured list (IL). The Astros activated him on June 26. On July 3, Peña produced his both first career four-hit and multi-homer game, as well as his second career walk-off home run, sealing a 4–2 win over the Angels. The Astros made Peña their regular number 2 hitter during the final phase of the regular season to replace an injured Michael Brantley. Going into the last regular-season series versus the Philadelphia Phillies, the Astros had produced an incredible 41–6 record with Peña batting second in the lineup.

Over the 2022 regular season, Peña batted .253./289/.426 with 132 hits, 22 home runs, 63 RBIs, 72 runs scored, 11 stolen bases, 22 walks, 135 strikeouts, and had the lowest walk/strikeout ratio in the majors (0.16). He tied Correa for the franchise rookie record for most home runs by a shortstop. Peña also ranked second in home runs, fourth in hits, and fifth in runs scored and RBIs among major league rookies. He had the fastest sprint speed on the Astros, at 29.4 feet per second.

On defense, Peña ranked second in the American League (AL) in Defensive Wins Above Replacement (2.4, dWAR), third in the AL in errors committed (19), and third among AL shortstops in total zone runs (8). He played 134 games at shortstop, starting 132 of them. He was graded 15 defensive runs better than “average” at shortstop.

Making his postseason debut in the American League Division Series (ALDS), Peña singled to precede a Yordan Alvarez game-winning home run in both of the first two games. The third game—which featured a postseason-record 17 scoreless innings—was decided by Peña's home run in the top of the 18th inning off Penn Murfee. His first career home run on the postseason stage, it thus concluded the longest shutout game in postseason history, 1–0, and clinched an ALDS sweep for Houston. Peña was named the Most Valuable Player (MVP) of the American League Championship Series (ALCS), hitting .353 with two home runs in the Astros' four-game sweep of the New York Yankees. In Game 5 of the World Series, he homered off Noah Syndergaard of the Phillies to become the first rookie shortstop to hit a home run in World Series play. The Astros won the World Series in six games, and Peña became the third rookie ever to be named the World Series MVP. He also became the first American League (AL) player–and ninth overall–to win both LCS and WS MVP honors in the same year.

==== 2023 ====
On July 29, 2023, Peña doubled among two hits and collected a career-best four RBI to lead an Astros' season-high scoring output in a 17–4 win over the Tampa Bay Rays. Peña's five hits on August 27 established a career-high, greatly contributing to a 17–4 win over the Detroit Tigers, including a franchise record-tying 25 hits. He was named the Astros' nominee for the Roberto Clemente Award. In the 2023 regular season, Peña played in a career-high 150 games, and also had career-highs with 152 hits, 81 runs scored, 32 doubles, 13 stolen bases, and 43 walks. He batted .263/.324/.381 in 634 plate appearances. On defense, he ranked second among AL shortstops with 150 games played, ranked first in putouts (200), assists (362), double plays turned (89), and third in errors (14). Peña struggled during the Astros playoff run, batting .200 with only one RBI in 11 games.

==== 2024 ====
On August 2, 2024, Peña was announced as the Astros' nominee for the annual Heart & Hustle Award. In 2024, he batted .266/.308/.394 with 15 home runs, 70 RBIs, and 20 stolen bases in 602 at bats, and led MLB in infield hits, with 31.

==== 2025 ====
Peña batting in April 2025

On January 9, 2025, the Astros signed Peña to a $4.1 million contract for the season, avoiding arbitration. From April 8–23, he established a new career-high 14-game hitting streak, and hit safely in 23 of 24 games including the streak. Peña collected four hits on May 14 versus the Kansas City Royals, including a single in the eighth inning that drove home the go-ahead run to secure a 4–3 Astros win. Peña tripled in two runs for his 500th career hit on May 22 at Daikin Park versus George Kirby, starting pitcher for the Mariners. After sustaining a rib fracture as the result of a hit by pitch on June 27, the Astros placed Peña on the 10-day IL. On July 6, Peña was announced as a reserve infielder for the American League at the MLB All-Star Game, his first career selection. He did not play in the All-Star game due to his rib injury and missed the month of July. He was activated from the injured list on August 1. On September 20, Peña connected for his first career grand slam, off Carlos Vargas of the Seattle Mariners. In total, Peña appeared in 125 games for the Astros and batted .304 with 17 home runs and 62 RBI. Peña was named the Astros' nominee for the Heart & Hustle Award for the second consecutive season.

==== 2026 ====
Peña did not play on Opening Day for the Astros in 2026 due to a broken finger and instead made his season debut on March 27. He was placed on the injured list with a hamstring strain on April 13, 2026. He rehabbed with the Double-A Corpus Christi Hooks but missed time after an on-field collision that resulted in a sore neck. He was activated from the injured list and returned to the Astros on May 18. On July 20, he hit a go-ahead grand slam against the Miami Marlins, and homered in three of his next five games. On July 26, Peña was recognized as AL Player of the Week for the first time in his career. During that span, he recorded three successive three-hit games while continuing an eight-game hitting streak as the Astros won of five of six contests. He hit .500 (13-for-26) with five home runs and eight RBI. In spite of appearing in a career-low 112 games, Peña scored a career-high 82 runs and tied career-highs off 22 home runs and .477 slugging percentage (SLG). He hit .277 with 19 doubles, 12 stolen bases, and 56 RBI. During the two-game Wild Card Series, he hit .375 (3-for-8) and homered. However, the Chicago White Sox swept the Astros to eliminate them from the playoffs.

== Awards and honors ==
Although he finished fifth in the AL Rookie of the Year (ROY) rankings, Peña was awarded the AL 2022 Gold Glove Award for his play at shortstop. He became the first Astros rookie to win a Gold Glove, and the first rookie ever to win a Gold Glove at shortstop in MLB history.

The Houston chapter of the Baseball Writers' Association of America (BBWAA) named Peña the Astros' Rookie of the Year.

On November 30, 2022, Peña was awarded the Key to the City of Providence in a 90-minute ceremony attended by officials including Rhode Island Governor Dan McKee and Mayor Jorge Elorza.

== Personal life ==
Peña has been in a relationship with Canada women's national soccer team player Julia Grosso since December 2024.

== See also ==
- Houston Astros award winners and league leaders
- List of Major League Baseball players from the Dominican Republic
- List of second-generation Major League Baseball players
