= 2022 American League Division Series =

Teams
Team (Wins)		Manager	Season
Houston Astros (3)		Dusty Baker	106–56 (.654), GA: 16
Seattle Mariners (0)		Scott Servais	90–72 (.556), GB: 16
- Dates: October 11–15
- Television: TBS
- TV announcers: Brian Anderson, Jeff Francoeur, and Matt Winer
- Radio: ESPN
- Radio announcers: Dave O'Brien and Marly Rivera
- Umpires: Cory Blaser, Pat Hoberg, James Hoye, Marvin Hudson (crew chief), Carlos Torres, Jansen Visconti

Teams
Team (Wins)		Manager	Season
New York Yankees (3)		Aaron Boone	99–63 (.611), GA: 7
Cleveland Guardians (2)		Terry Francona	92–70 (.568), GA: 11
- Dates: October 11–18
- Television: TBS (Note: Due to Game 3 of the Astros-Mariners ALDS going 18 innings, the entirety of the third game was televised on the designated overflow station, TNT.)
- TV announcers: Bob Costas, Ron Darling, Lauren Shehadi (Games 1–4), and Matt Winer (Game 5)
- Radio: ESPN
- Radio announcers: Dan Shulman and Eduardo Pérez
- Umpires: Jordan Baker, Dan Iassogna (crew chief), Will Little, Alan Porter, Jeremie Rehak, Mark Ripperger
- ALWC: Cleveland Guardians over Tampa Bay Rays (2–0); Seattle Mariners over Toronto Blue Jays (2–0)

The 2022 American League Division Series (ALDS) were the two best-of-five playoff series in Major League Baseball’s (MLB) 2022 postseason to determine the participating teams of the 2022 American League Championship Series. These matchups are:

- (1) Houston Astros (AL West champions) vs. (5) Seattle Mariners (Wild Card Series winner): Astros won the series, 3–0.
- (2) New York Yankees (AL East champions) vs. (3) Cleveland Guardians (AL Central champions, Wild Card Series winner): Yankees won the series, 3–2.

The team with the better regular-season record (higher seed) of each series hosted Games 1, 2, and (if necessary) 5, while the lower-seeded team hosted Game 3 and (if necessary) 4. Following the series, the Yankees and Astros met in the 2022 American League Championship Series, with the Astros sweeping the series in four games. The Astros would go on to win the 2022 World Series over the National League champion Philadelphia Phillies, four games to two.

== Background ==
The top two division winners (first two seeds) are determined by regular season winning percentages. The final two teams are the winners of the American League Wild Card Series, played between the league's third to sixth-seeded teams.

The Houston Astros (106–56) clinched their sixth straight playoff berth and seventh in eight years on September 16. They then clinched both the American League West and first-round bye from the American League Wild Card Series on September 19 and the 1 seed in the American League on September 30 after the Yankees lost to the Baltimore Orioles, thus earning them home-field advantage throughout the American League playoff. They played against the Seattle Mariners (90–72), who clinched their first division series berth and appearance since 2001 by defeating the Toronto Blue Jays in a two-game sweep in the Wild Card Series. The Astros won 12 of the 19 games they played versus the Mariners in the regular season.

The New York Yankees (99–63) clinched their sixth straight postseason appearance on September 22. They then clinched the American League East and a first-round bye on September 27, marking their first AL East title since 2019, locked into 2 seed 3 days later after they lost to the Baltimore Orioles, and played the third-seeded Cleveland Guardians (92–70), who clinched a division series berth by defeating the Tampa Bay Rays in a two-game sweep in the Wild Card Series, (Note: The Guardians clinched the American League Central division championship for the 2022 regular season. They were locked into the third seed as the worst division winner in terms of record and hosted the sixth-seeded wild card entrant Rays in the Wild Card Series since the 2022 postseason was expanded to six teams per league with the lowest-seeded division winner hosting the sixth-seed in the first playoff round.) their first division series appearance since 2018, and first under the Guardians moniker. New York won 5 out of 6 games against Cleveland.

== Matchups ==
=== Houston Astros vs. Seattle Mariners ===
Houston won the series, 3–0.

Game	Date	Score	Location	Time	Attendance
1	October 11	Seattle Mariners – 7, Houston Astros – 8	Minute Maid Park	3:39	41,125
2	October 13	Seattle Mariners – 2, Houston Astros – 4	Minute Maid Park	3:15	41,774
3	October 15	Houston Astros – 1, Seattle Mariners – 0 (18)	T-Mobile Park	6:22	47,690

=== New York Yankees vs. Cleveland Guardians ===
New York won the series, 3–2.

Game	Date	Score	Location	Time	Attendance
1	October 11	Cleveland Guardians – 1, New York Yankees – 4	Yankee Stadium	2:56	47,807
2	October 14†	Cleveland Guardians – 4, New York Yankees – 2 (10)	Yankee Stadium	4:10	47,535
3	October 15	New York Yankees – 5, Cleveland Guardians – 6	Progressive Field	3:30	36,483
4	October 16	New York Yankees – 4, Cleveland Guardians – 2	Progressive Field	3:02	36,728
5	October 18‡	Cleveland Guardians – 1, New York Yankees – 5	Yankee Stadium	3:11	48,178

† Game 2 was originally scheduled for October 13 but was postponed due to rain.
‡ Game 5 was originally scheduled for October 17 but was postponed due to rain.

== Houston vs. Seattle ==
This was the first postseason meeting between Seattle and Houston. During the regular season, the Astros won the season series 12-7 and finished first in the American League West, 16 games in front of the second-place Mariners.

=== Game 1 ===
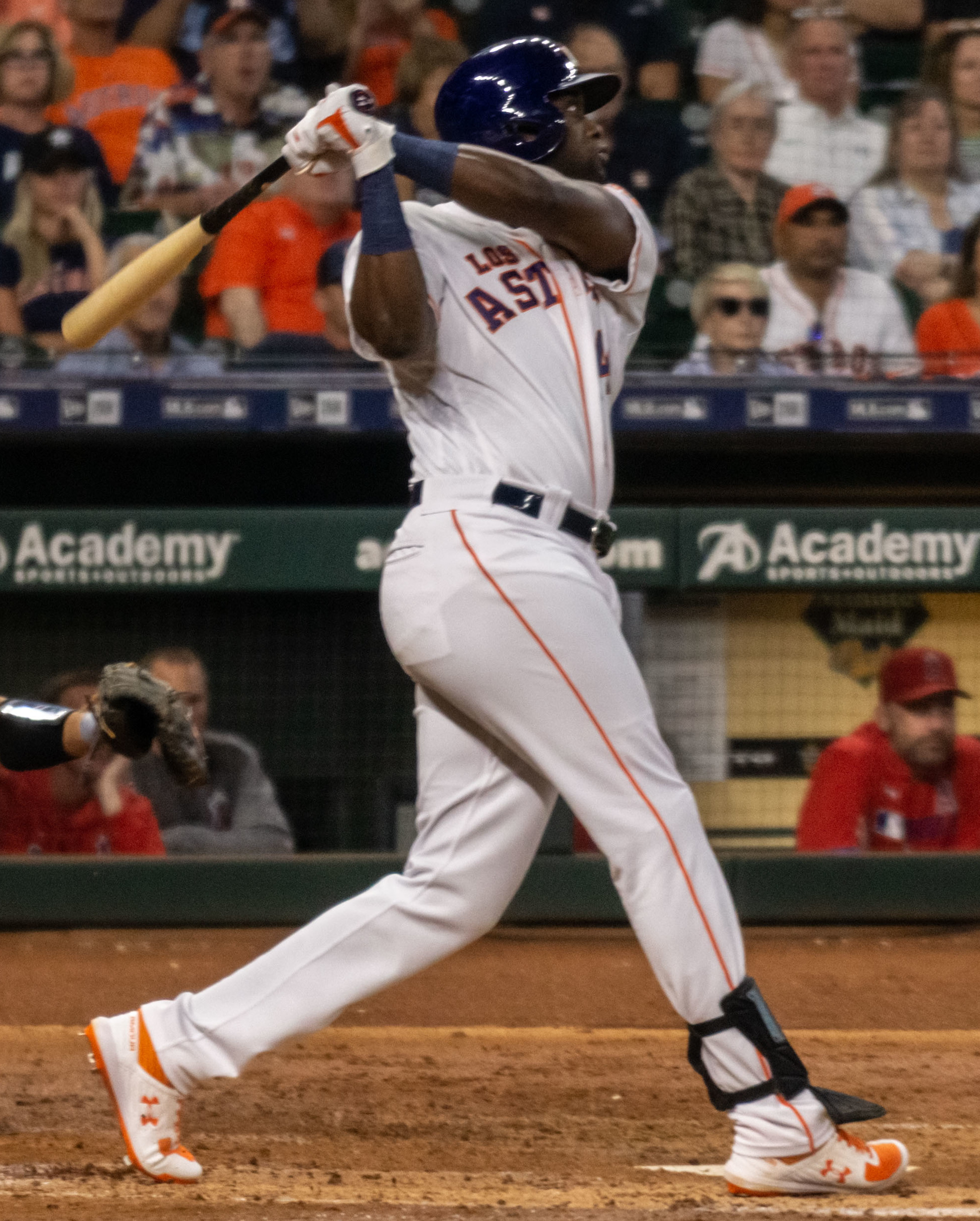
Yordan Alvarez hit a three-run walk-off home run in Game 1.

October 11, 2022 2:37 pm (CDT) at Minute Maid Park in Houston, Texas 73 °F (23 °C), roof closed
Team	1	2	3	4	5	6	7	8	9	R	H	E
Seattle	1	3	0	2	0	0	1	0	0	7	13	0
Houston	0	0	2	1	0	0	0	2	3	8	11	0
WP: Rafael Montero (1–0) LP: Robbie Ray (0–1); Home runs: SEA: J. P. Crawford (1), Eugenio Suárez (1); HOU: Yuli Gurriel (1), Alex Bregman (1), Yordan Alvarez (1); Attendance: 41,125; Boxscore

In the first postseason matchup between the two teams, Justin Verlander made his first postseason start since Game 6 of the 2019 World Series while Logan Gilbert was making his first career postseason start for Seattle. The Mariners jumped Verlander early with a Cal Raleigh RBI single in the first and three more runs in the second from a Julio Rodríguez double and Ty France single. The Astros put runs on the board in the third with a two-run double from Yordan Alvarez. J. P. Crawford hit a solo homer and France drove in Rodríguez to increase the Mariners' lead to four in the fourth. Verlander closed out the inning and ended his day, giving up 10 hits and six runs over four innings pitched. Yuli Gurriel led off the bottom of the inning with a solo shot to cut the deficit in half, but Eugenio Suárez crushed a solo homer into the Crawford Boxes in the seventh to widen the lead. Alex Bregman hit a two-run shot in the bottom of the eighth to bring it within two and set up the dramatic events of the ninth inning.

Mariners reliever Paul Sewald hit David Hensley with a pitch and allowed a Jeremy Pena single while only getting two outs before Robbie Ray, who had started the clinching Game 2 of the Wild Card Series against Toronto, was brought on in relief to face Yordan Alvarez. Alvarez slammed Ray's second pitch into deep right field, stunning the Mariners for a walk-off Game 1 victory. It was the first postseason walk-off win for the Astros since Game 5 of the 2020 American League Championship Series; the first walk-off postseason home run by a trailing team since Game 6 of the 1993 World Series, and fourth overall; the second walk-off postseason home run in history to be hit with a team down to their final out, with the other one being in the 1988 World Series; and the first ever by a team trailing by multiple runs with two outs. Alvarez went 3-for-5 and drove in five runs and made important contributions on defense—MLB.com analyst Mike Petriello argued this was the greatest performance in playoff history by a position player.

=== Game 2 ===
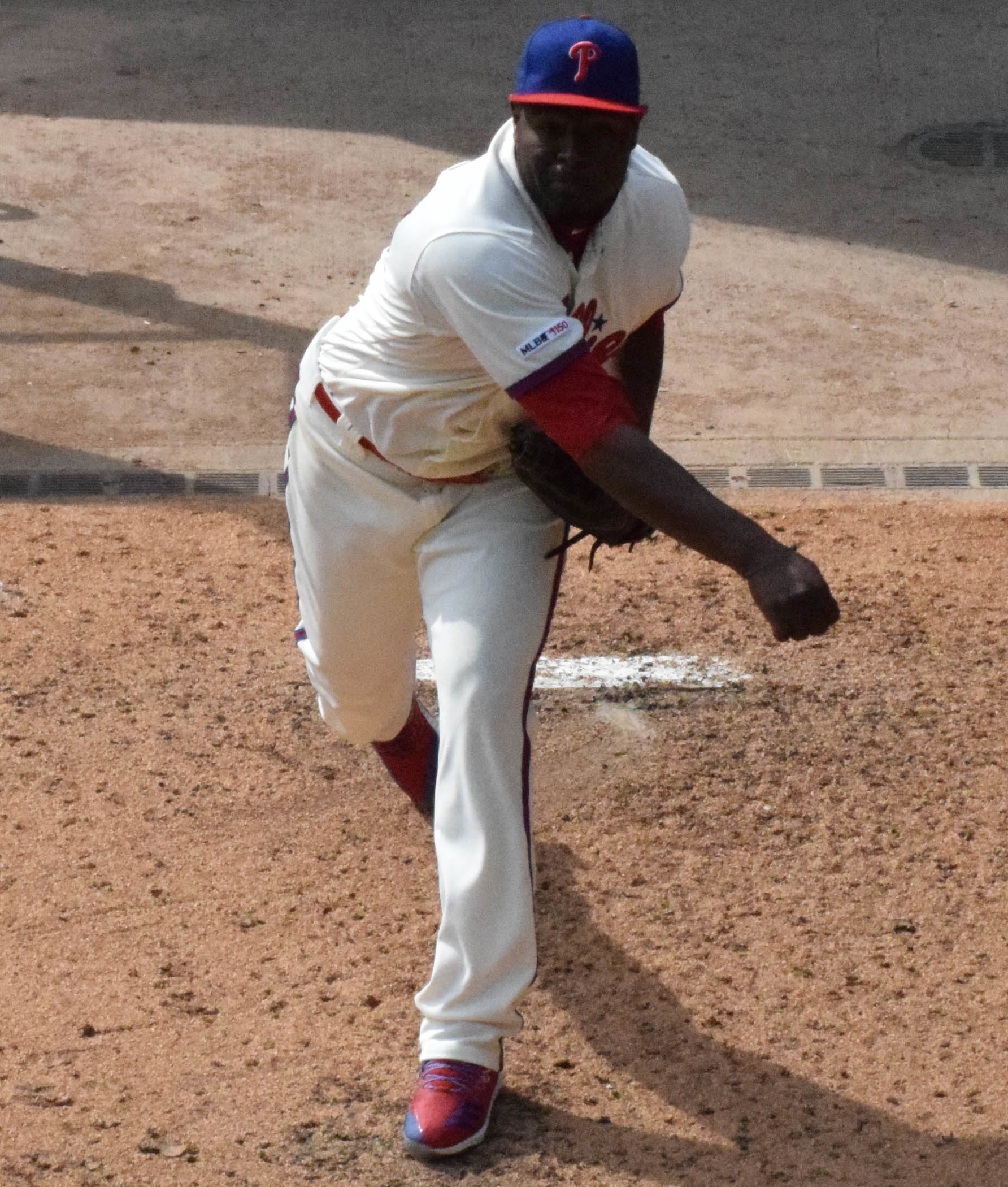
Astros winning pitcher Héctor Neris (pictured with the Phillies) induced a ground out in the top of the 6th to get out of a bases-loaded situation in Game 2.

October 13, 2022 2:37 pm (CDT) at Minute Maid Park in Houston, Texas 73 °F (23 °C), roof closed
Team	1	2	3	4	5	6	7	8	9	R	H	E
Seattle	0	0	0	2	0	0	0	0	0	2	5	0
Houston	0	1	0	0	0	2	0	1	X	4	6	1
WP: Héctor Neris (1–0) LP: Luis Castillo (0–1) Sv: Ryan Pressly (1); Home runs: SEA: None; HOU: Kyle Tucker (1), Yordan Alvarez (2); Attendance: 41,774; Boxscore

As it happened two days earlier, Seattle tried to hold on to a lead late in the game before Yordan Alvarez came up to the plate to crush those plans. In the sixth inning, with two outs, Jeremy Pena lined a hit to get on base for Alvarez to bat. A couple of pitches later, Alvarez lined a towering shot into left field off of Luis Castillo to give the Astros a 3–2 lead. He became the second player to hit go-ahead home runs in the sixth inning or later of back-to-back postseason games, joining Troy Glaus in the 2002 American League Division Series, and the first to do it with his team trailing in both games.

Kyle Tucker had started the scoring with a home run for Houston in the bottom of the second, while the Mariners got their two runs in the fourth on a fielder's choice error scoring Eugenio Suárez and a Dylan Moore single scoring Mitch Haniger. In the eighth inning, Pena drew a walk to bring up Alvarez with two outs, which led to Seattle intentionally walking him. Alex Bregman was next, and he hit a line drive to right field that got Pena running all the way home. Seattle left thirteen runners on base, which included having the bases loaded in the sixth (with Héctor Neris inducing a ground out) and a double play lineout in the ninth. With the win, the Astros had won the first two games of an ALDS for the sixth straight year.

=== Game 3 ===
Jeremy Peña hit the series-winning home run in the top of the 18th inning in Game 3.

October 15, 2022 1:07 pm (PDT) at T-Mobile Park in Seattle, Washington 70 °F (21 °C), roof open, mostly sunny
Team	1	2	3	4	5	6	7	8	9	10	11	12	13	14	15	16	17	18	R	H	E
Houston	0	0	0	0	0	0	0	0	0	0	0	0	0	0	0	0	0	1	1	11	0
Seattle	0	0	0	0	0	0	0	0	0	0	0	0	0	0	0	0	0	0	0	7	0
WP: Luis García (1–0) LP: Penn Murfee (0–1); Home runs: HOU: Jeremy Peña (1); SEA: None; Attendance: 47,690; Boxscore

A new postseason record was set in this game, the first postseason game in Seattle in 21 years. The two teams did not score for 17 innings, becoming the longest scoreless postseason game in Major League history, surpassing the record of 14 scoreless innings in the 2022 American League Wild Card Series Game 2 between the Cleveland Guardians and the Tampa Bay Rays a week earlier. The game also broke the record set that day for most combined strikeouts in a postseason game with 42.

Jeremy Peña hit a solo home run to give Houston the lead in the top of the 18th. Luis García hurled five scoreless innings of relief to earn the victory in a game that lasted six hours and 22 minutes. With 18 innings, this game is tied with the 2005 NLDS Game 4, 2014 NLDS Game 2, and 2018 World Series Game 3 as the longest postseason games in Major League history in terms of innings, with this being the second to go the full eighteen (as the home team in two of the games won on a walk-off before making three outs); the Astros had previously participated in the 2005 contest, thereby making them the first team to participate in multiple eighteen-inning postseason games in MLB history. In addition, this was the first game to go 18 innings since a 19-inning September 24, 2019 game between the Cardinals and Diamondbacks.

With the win, the Astros made it into the ALCS for six consecutive years. This is a record for American League teams and second most overall next to the Atlanta Braves, who made eight straight trips to the NLCS from 1991 to 1999 but only had to win a postseason series to reach the LCS for five of them while the Astros had to win a postseason series each of their six times to reach the ALCS.

=== Composite line score ===
2022 ALDS (3–0): Houston Astros beat Seattle Mariners

Team	1	2	3	4	5	6	7	8	9	10	11	12	13	14	15	16	17	18	R	H	E
Seattle Mariners	1	3	0	4	0	0	1	0	0	0	0	0	0	0	0	0	0	0	9	25	0
Houston Astros	0	1	2	1	0	2	0	3	3	0	0	0	0	0	0	0	0	1	13	28	1
Total attendance: 130,589 Average attendance: 43,530

== New York vs. Cleveland ==
This was the sixth postseason meeting between the Yankees and Guardians, with the Yankees holding a 3–2 advantage in their postseason meetings. The Guardians (then named Indians) previously won the 1997 American League Division Series 3–2 and the 2007 American League Division Series 3–1, while the Yankees previously won the 1998 American League Championship Series 4–2 and the 2017 American League Division Series 3–2. The fifth and latest meeting came during the 2020 American League Wild Card Series when New York swept Cleveland in two games. In the regular season, New York won the season series 5–1.

=== Game 1 ===
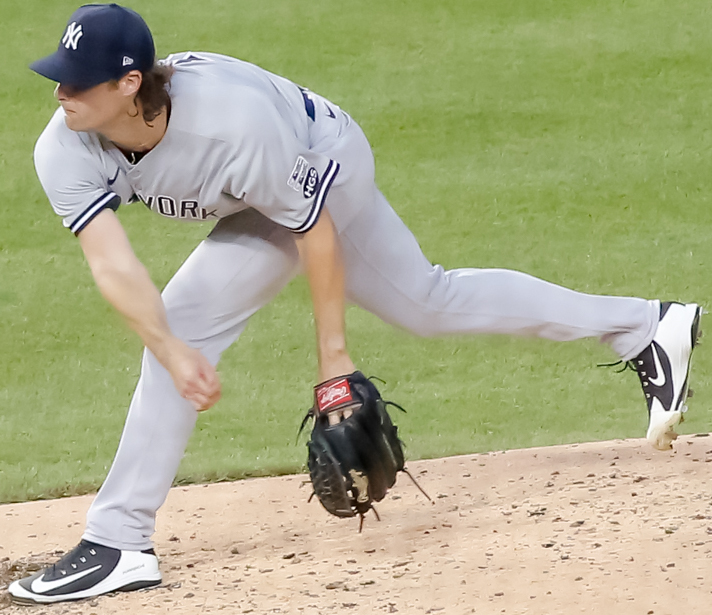
Gerrit Cole struck out 8 hitters in Game 1.

October 11, 2022 7:37 pm (EDT) at Yankee Stadium in The Bronx, New York 64 °F (18 °C), clear
Team	1	2	3	4	5	6	7	8	9	R	H	E
Cleveland	0	0	1	0	0	0	0	0	0	1	6	2
New York	0	0	1	0	1	2	0	0	X	4	5	1
WP: Gerrit Cole (1–0) LP: Cal Quantrill (0–1); Home runs: CLE: Steven Kwan (1); NYY: Harrison Bader (1), Anthony Rizzo (1); Attendance: 47,807; Boxscore

Gerrit Cole took the mound in his first postseason home game for the Yankees, who despite making the postseason in each of the last two seasons, had not played a home game in the playoffs since October 18, 2019. Steven Kwan homered off of Cole to right field to make it 1–0 Guardians in the third inning. The home run Cole gave up marked his seventh postseason appearance, giving up a home run, tied for the most home runs given up in consecutive postseason appearances. In the bottom of the third, the Yankees struck back as Harrison Bader hit a solo shot to left to tie the game. In the fifth, Isiah Kiner-Falefa hit a triple to right field, and catcher Jose Trevino had a sacrifice fly scoring Kiner-Falefa to make it 2–1. Then in the bottom of the sixth inning, Aaron Judge walked and stole second base and went to third due to a throwing error by Austin Hedges attempting to pick Judge off. The next batter Anthony Rizzo hit a two-run home run scoring Judge from third to extend the Yankees' lead to 4–1. After giving up the home run to Kwan, Cole bounced back as he pitched 6 1/3 innings, allowing four hits, one walk, hitting one batter, and striking out eight batters to get the win. Clay Holmes faced the final two batters in the ninth and closed out the 4–1 victory. With the win, this marked the sixth straight postseason victory over the Guardians, starting from the Yankees' 2–0 comeback in the 2017 ALDS.

=== Game 2 ===
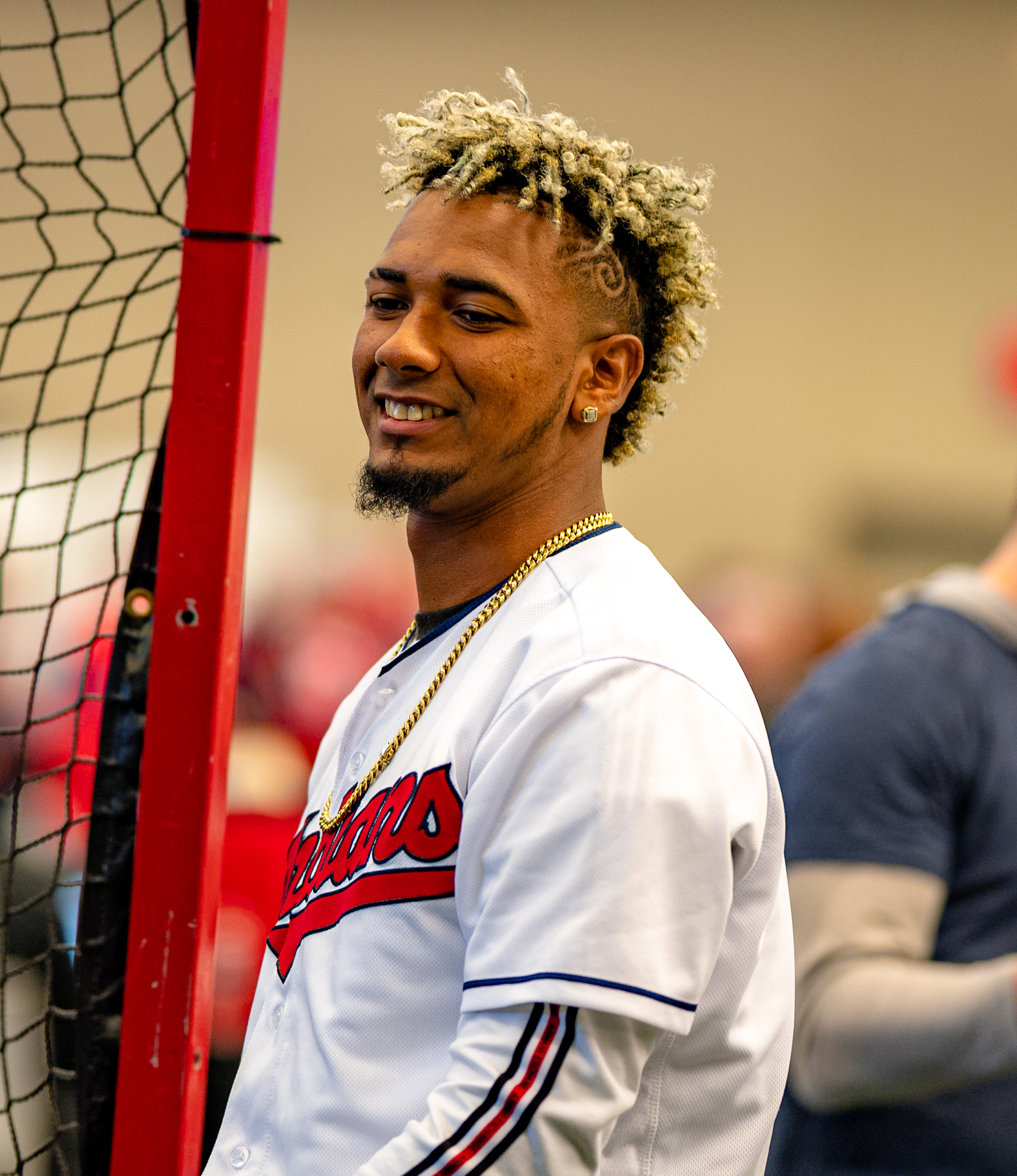
Emmanuel Clase earned a 2 1/3 inning win in Game 2.

October 14, 2022 1:07 pm (EDT) at Yankee Stadium in The Bronx, New York 62 °F (17 °C), mostly sunny
Team	1	2	3	4	5	6	7	8	9	10	R	H	E
Cleveland	0	0	0	1	1	0	0	0	0	2	4	9	0
New York	2	0	0	0	0	0	0	0	0	0	2	6	2
WP: Emmanuel Clase (1–0) LP: Jameson Taillon (0–1); Home runs: CLE: Amed Rosario (1); NYY: Giancarlo Stanton (1); Attendance: 47,535; Boxscore

Game 2 was originally scheduled to be played on October 13 at 7:37 pm (EDT), but was postponed to October 14 at 1:07 pm (EDT) due to the forecast of sustained inclement weather. Nestor Cortés Jr. was slated to go for the Yankees against Shane Bieber for the Guardians. Giancarlo Stanton got the scoring started early with a two-run home run to the short porch in right field in the first inning. This would be the only time the Yankees scored for the rest of the game as Bieber would settle in and strike out seven over 5 2/3 innings. Cortés shut down the Guardians through the first three innings before giving up an RBI single to Andrés Giménez in the fourth and a game-tying home run to Amed Rosario in the fifth, finishing his day with three walks and three strikeouts over five innings. Both bullpens kept the game tied until Oscar González hit an RBI single off of Jameson Taillon in the 10th inning. Josh Naylor would tack on an insurance run with an RBI double, and Emmanuel Clase would finish off the game with a scoreless frame to tie the series at one game apiece heading to Cleveland.

=== Game 3 ===
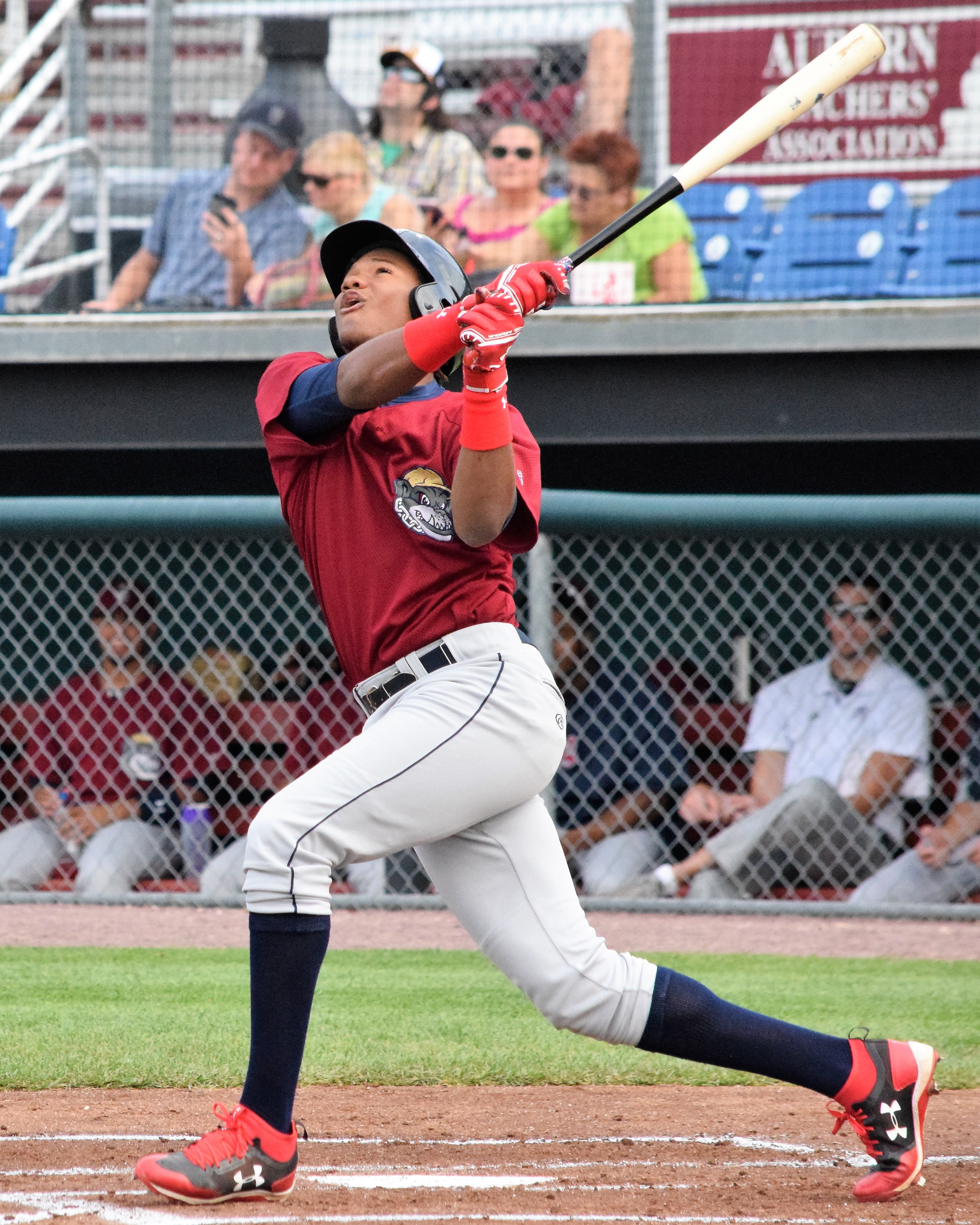
Oscar González (pictured here with the Mahoning Valley Scrappers) hit a walk-off single in game 3.

October 15, 2022 7:37 pm (EDT) at Progressive Field in Cleveland, Ohio 49 °F (9 °C), Clear
Team	1	2	3	4	5	6	7	8	9	R	H	E
New York	0	0	2	0	2	0	1	0	0	5	5	0
Cleveland	1	1	0	0	0	1	0	0	3	6	15	0
WP: Eli Morgan (1–0) LP: Clarke Schmidt (0–1); Home runs: NYY: Aaron Judge (1), Oswaldo Cabrera (1), Harrison Bader (2); CLE: None; Attendance: 36,483; Boxscore

Luis Severino and Triston McKenzie squared off against each other in Game 3 as the series moved to Cleveland. The Guardians got the scoring started early as Josh Naylor and Steven Kwan both hit RBI singles in the first and second to put the Guardians up 2–0, but the Yankees responded in the third when Aaron Judge hit a two-run homer to tie the game up. Oswaldo Cabrera would put the Yankees up 4–2 in the fifth with a two-run shot of his own. McKenzie would finish the inning and end his night with 5 strikeouts and four runs given up over five innings. The Guardians would chase Severino in the sixth after he gave up back-to-back singles and cut the deficit to one after an RBI single from Will Brennan. Harrison Bader padded the Yankees' lead with a solo shot in the seventh, and Wandy Peralta came in to try and finish the game off with a seven-out save. After bringing the game within one again from an Amed Rosario RBI single, Oscar González hit a walk-off two-run single for a comeback 6–5 victory and a stunning 2–1 lead in the series. It was the second walk-off hit of the postseason for González after his walk-off home run in Game 2 of the Wild Card Series.

=== Game 4 ===
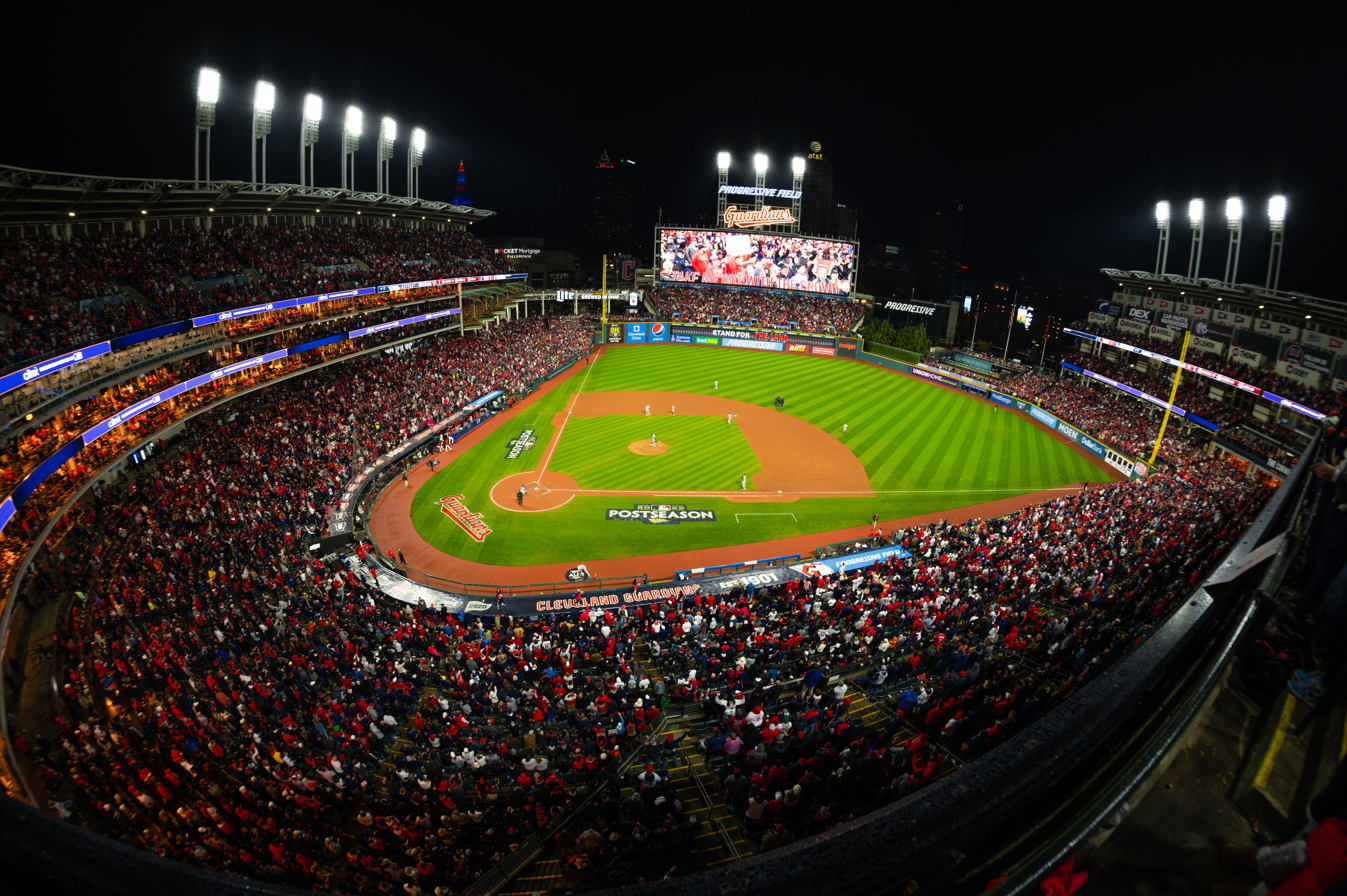
Progressive Field during Game 4 of the ALDS

October 16, 2022 7:07 pm (EDT) at Progressive Field in Cleveland, Ohio 58 °F (14 °C), Overcast
Team	1	2	3	4	5	6	7	8	9	R	H	E
New York	1	2	0	0	0	1	0	0	0	4	6	1
Cleveland	0	0	1	1	0	0	0	0	0	2	6	1
WP: Gerrit Cole (2–0) LP: Cal Quantrill (0–2) Sv: Wandy Peralta (1); Home runs: NYY: Harrison Bader (3); CLE: Josh Naylor (1); Attendance: 36,728; Boxscore

Cal Quantrill and Gerrit Cole faced off in a rematch of Game 1 as the Guardians looked to advance to their first ALCS since 2016. The Yankees jumped on Quantrill early with an Anthony Rizzo RBI single in the first and a two-run homer from Harrison Bader in the second to grab an early 3–0 lead. José Ramírez got the Guardians on the board in the third inning with an RBI single, but was thrown out trying to advance to second to end the inning. Josh Naylor cut the deficit to one with a solo homer in the fourth and, while rounding the bases, stared down Cole while performing a baby rocking motion that drew the ire of opposing fans and the media. Cole shook off the home run and finished with eight strikeouts over seven innings of two-run ball. Giancarlo Stanton tacked on an insurance run in the sixth with a sacrifice fly, and the Yankees' bullpen finished the game with two scoreless innings to tie the series at 2–2 and force it back to New York.

=== Game 5 ===
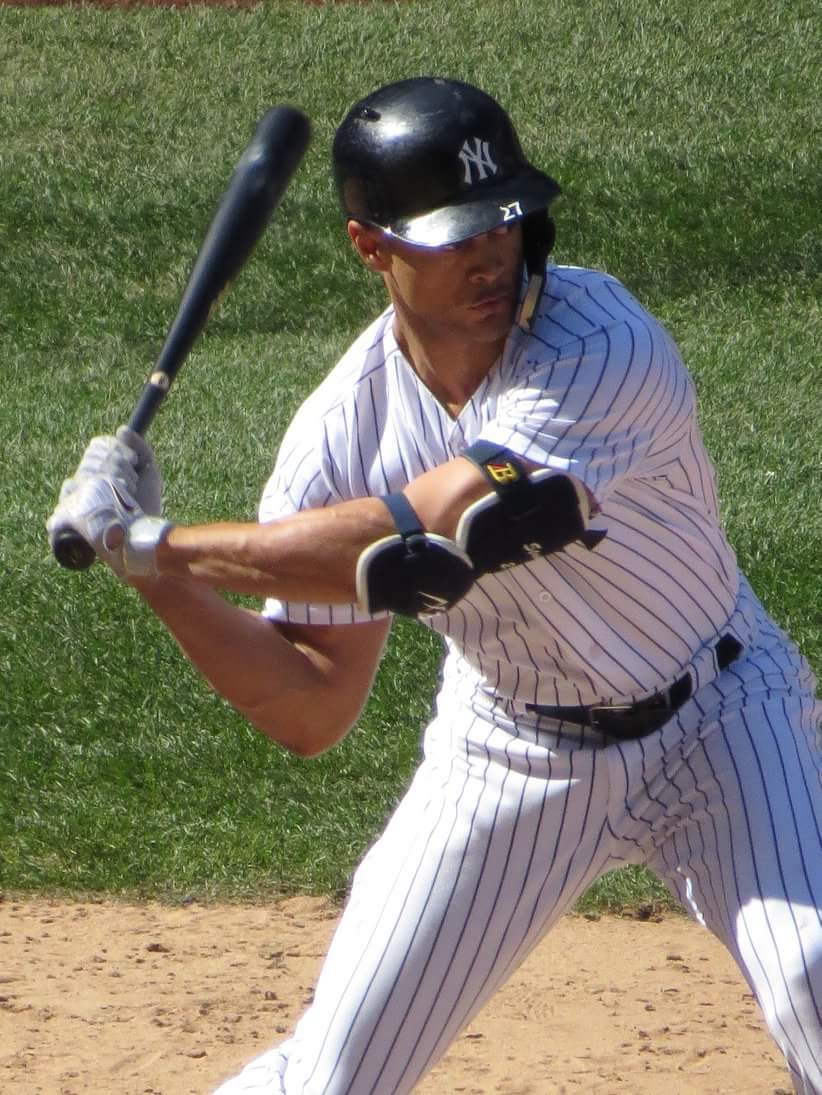
Giancarlo Stanton hit a 3-run home run in the first inning of Game 5.

October 18, 2022 4:07 pm (EDT) at Yankee Stadium in The Bronx, New York 57 °F (14 °C), Sunny
Team	1	2	3	4	5	6	7	8	9	R	H	E
Cleveland	0	0	1	0	0	0	0	0	0	1	8	0
New York	3	1	0	0	1	0	0	0	X	5	6	0
WP: Nestor Cortés Jr. (1–0) LP: Aaron Civale (0–1); Home runs: CLE: None; NYY: Giancarlo Stanton (2), Aaron Judge (2); Attendance: 48,178; Boxscore

Due to a rain delay, the second of the series, the game was forced to be postponed from October 17 to October 18, overlapping with the first game of the NLCS for the first time in Major League History.

The Yankees tasked Nestor Cortés Jr. to help them advance to the ALCS while, in a controversial move, Terry Francona elected to start Aaron Civale over Game 2 starter Shane Bieber. The move immediately backfired as Giancarlo Stanton hit a three-run home run in the first inning and chased Civale after only getting one out. Aaron Judge followed up with a solo home run in the second inning, and Cortés threw five innings while only giving up one run, a sacrifice fly from José Ramírez in the third inning. Anthony Rizzo would pad the lead with an RBI single in the fifth inning, and the Yankees' bullpen sealed the game and the series with four scoreless innings, advancing to the ALCS for the first time since 2019. Due to the compressed schedule from the rain delays in the series, the Yankees held a quick post-game celebration before flying to Houston for Game 1 of the ALCS the following day.

=== Composite line score ===
2022 ALDS (3–2): New York Yankees beat Cleveland Guardians

Team	1	2	3	4	5	6	7	8	9	10	R	H	E
Cleveland Guardians	1	1	3	2	1	1	0	0	3	2	14	44	3
New York Yankees	6	3	3	0	4	3	1	0	0	0	20	28	4
Total attendance: 216,731 Average attendance: 43,346

== See also ==
- 2022 National League Division Series
- 2022 American League Championship Series
- Guardians–Yankees rivalry
