= 2022 American League Championship Series =

Team (Wins)	Managers	Season
Houston Astros (4)	Dusty Baker	106–56 (.654), GA: 16
New York Yankees (0)	Aaron Boone	99–63 (.611), GA: 7
- Dates: October 19–23
- MVP: Jeremy Peña (Houston)
- Umpires: Vic Carapazza, Chris Conroy, Chris Guccione, Adrian Johnson, Alfonso Márquez (crew chief), Mike Muchlinski, D.J. Reyburn

Broadcast
- Television: TBS
- TV announcers: Brian Anderson, Ron Darling, Jeff Francoeur, and Lauren Shehadi
- Radio: ESPN
- Radio announcers: Dan Shulman and Eduardo Pérez
- ALDS: Houston Astros over Seattle Mariners (3–0); New York Yankees over Cleveland Guardians (3–2)

The 2022 American League Championship Series (ALCS) was the best-of-seven playoff in Major League Baseball's 2022 postseason between the top-seeded Houston Astros and the second-seeded New York Yankees for the American League (AL) pennant and the right to play in the 2022 World Series.

The series began on October 19 with a potential Game 7 scheduled for October 26 if it had been necessary, with the only off-day being October 21. TBS televised all games in the United States. For the fourth time in the last six seasons, the Astros won the ALCS to advance to the 2022 World Series, defeating the Yankees in a four-game sweep. Astros shortstop Jeremy Peña was named the Series MVP, hitting .353 with two home runs.

The Astros would go on to defeat the Philadelphia Phillies in the World Series in six games, winning their second World Series championship in six years and the second in franchise history.

== Background ==
The Houston Astros qualified for the postseason as the American League West division winner and the league's top seed. It was their fifth AL West championship in six years and their second straight divisional championship. In the Division Series, they swept the Seattle Mariners. This was the Astros' sixth consecutive appearance in the American League Championship Series (ALCS), an AL record, and the second most consecutive LCS appearances since the Atlanta Braves, who made eight in a row from 1991 to 1999 (not counting the canceled 1994 season).

The New York Yankees qualified for the postseason as the American League East division winner and the league's second seed. It was their second AL East championship in four years. In the Division Series, they defeated the Cleveland Guardians in five games.

This series is a continuation of the recent Astros–Yankees rivalry, as it marked the fourth time the two clubs have faced off in the playoffs and the third in the ALCS. The Astros previously defeated the Yankees in the 2015 Wild Card, the 2017 ALCS, and the 2019 ALCS. Houston won five of the seven games against New York during the regular season, with the Yankees only winning via walk-off hits (in addition, Houston had the lead or was tied in all of their plate appearances). This is the first postseason meeting between the two teams since the revelation of the Houston Astros sign stealing scandal, which included the 2017 American League Championship Series; however, despite allegations, there was no evidence of electronic sign-stealing during the 2019 season.

After defeating the Guardians in the ALDS, a group of Yankees fans was filmed chanting "We Want Houston," with an accompanying sign. The video went viral and became a rallying cry among Astros players and fans.

== Summary ==
Houston won the series, 4–0.

Game	Date	Score	Location	Time	Attendance
1	October 19	New York Yankees – 2, Houston Astros – 4	Minute Maid Park	3:21	41,487
2	October 20	New York Yankees – 2, Houston Astros – 3	Minute Maid Park	3:16	41,700
3	October 22	Houston Astros – 5, New York Yankees – 0	Yankee Stadium	3:35	47,569
4	October 23	Houston Astros – 6, New York Yankees – 5	Yankee Stadium	3:37 (1:47 delay)	46,545

== Game summaries ==
=== Game 1 ===
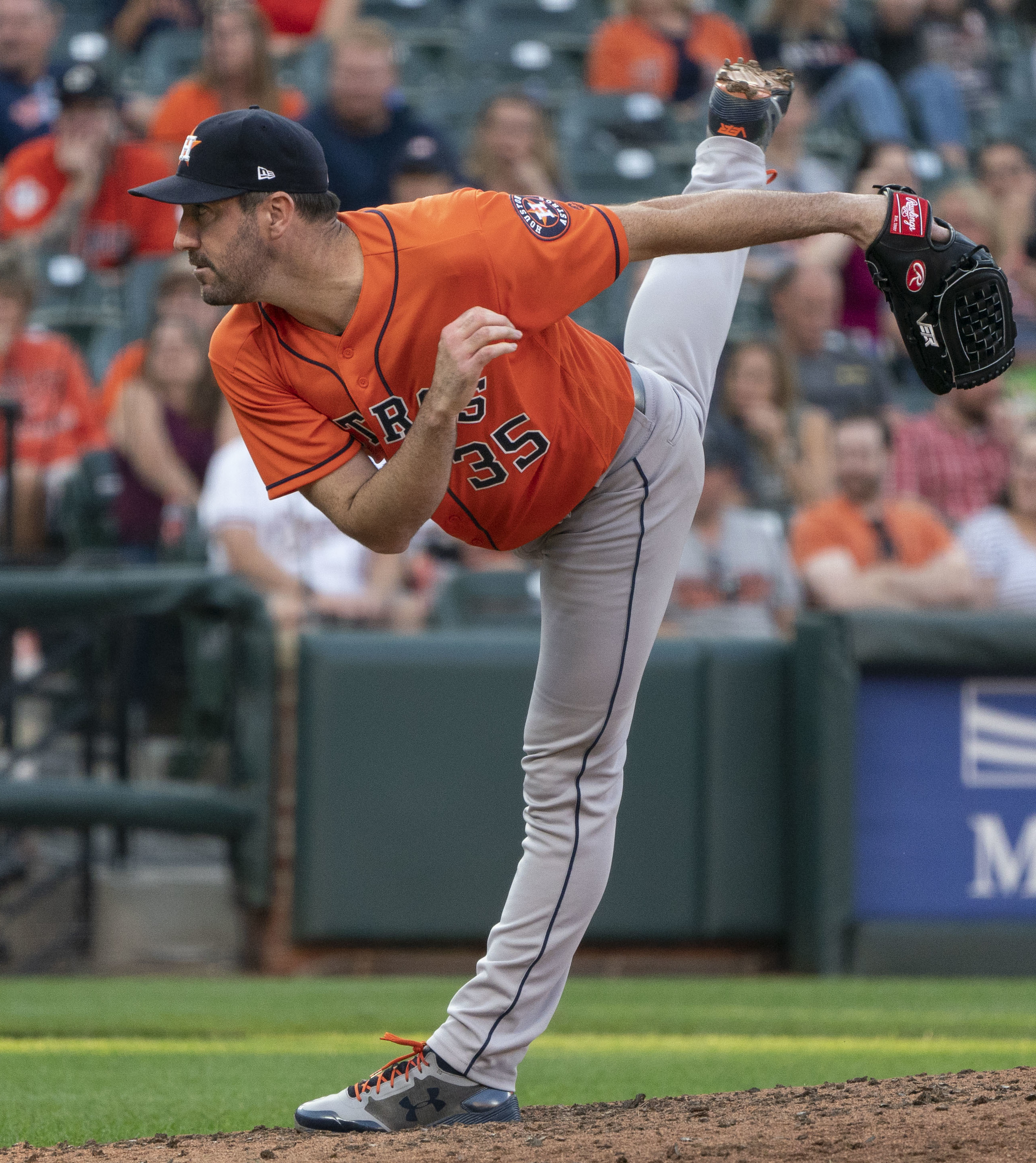
Justin Verlander struck out 11 hitters in Game 1.

October 19, 2022 6:37 pm (CDT) at Minute Maid Park in Houston, Texas 67 °F (19 °C), roof closed
Team	1	2	3	4	5	6	7	8	9	R	H	E
New York	0	1	0	0	0	0	0	1	0	2	5	0
Houston	0	1	0	0	0	2	1	0	X	4	7	1
WP: Justin Verlander (1–0) LP: Clarke Schmidt (0–1) Sv: Ryan Pressly (1); Home runs: NYY: Harrison Bader (1), Anthony Rizzo (1); HOU: Yuli Gurriel (1), Chas McCormick (1), Jeremy Peña (1); Attendance: 41,487; Boxscore

Game 1 featured the Astros' Justin Verlander going up against Jameson Taillon for the Yankees. Harrison Bader got the scoring started with a solo home run in the top of the second. It was his fourth home run of the postseason, becoming the first Yankee player to hit four home runs in their first six postseason games. The Astros responded in the bottom half of the inning when Martín Maldonado drove in Chas McCormick with an RBI double to tie the game at one. After some early trouble, Verlander settled in, giving up only one run and striking out eleven batters in six innings, passing Clayton Kershaw for the most postseason strikeouts in Major League history. Taillon was taken out in the fifth after giving up a double to Jeremy Peña, finishing with 4 1/3 innings pitched. Clarke Schmidt, who was brought on in relief, would walk the bases loaded before getting Kyle Tucker to ground into an inning-ending double play. Yuli Gurriel grabbed the lead back for the Astros in the sixth with a lead-off homer, shortly followed by another home run by McCormick to bring the score to 3–1. Peña would also homer in the seventh to cap off his night, going 3-for-4 with two doubles and a home run and pushing the lead to 4–1. Anthony Rizzo hit a solo shot off of Rafael Montero in the eighth, and the Yankees threatened with a single by Giancarlo Stanton and a two-out walk by Josh Donaldson to bring the go-ahead run to the plate. Ryan Pressly was called on for the four-out save and struck out Matt Carpenter to end the eighth and finished off the game with a perfect ninth to give the Astros a 1–0 series lead. The Yankees struck out a total of 17 times in the game, while the Astros struck out twice. The 15-strikeout difference between the two teams was the largest differential in postseason history.

=== Game 2 ===
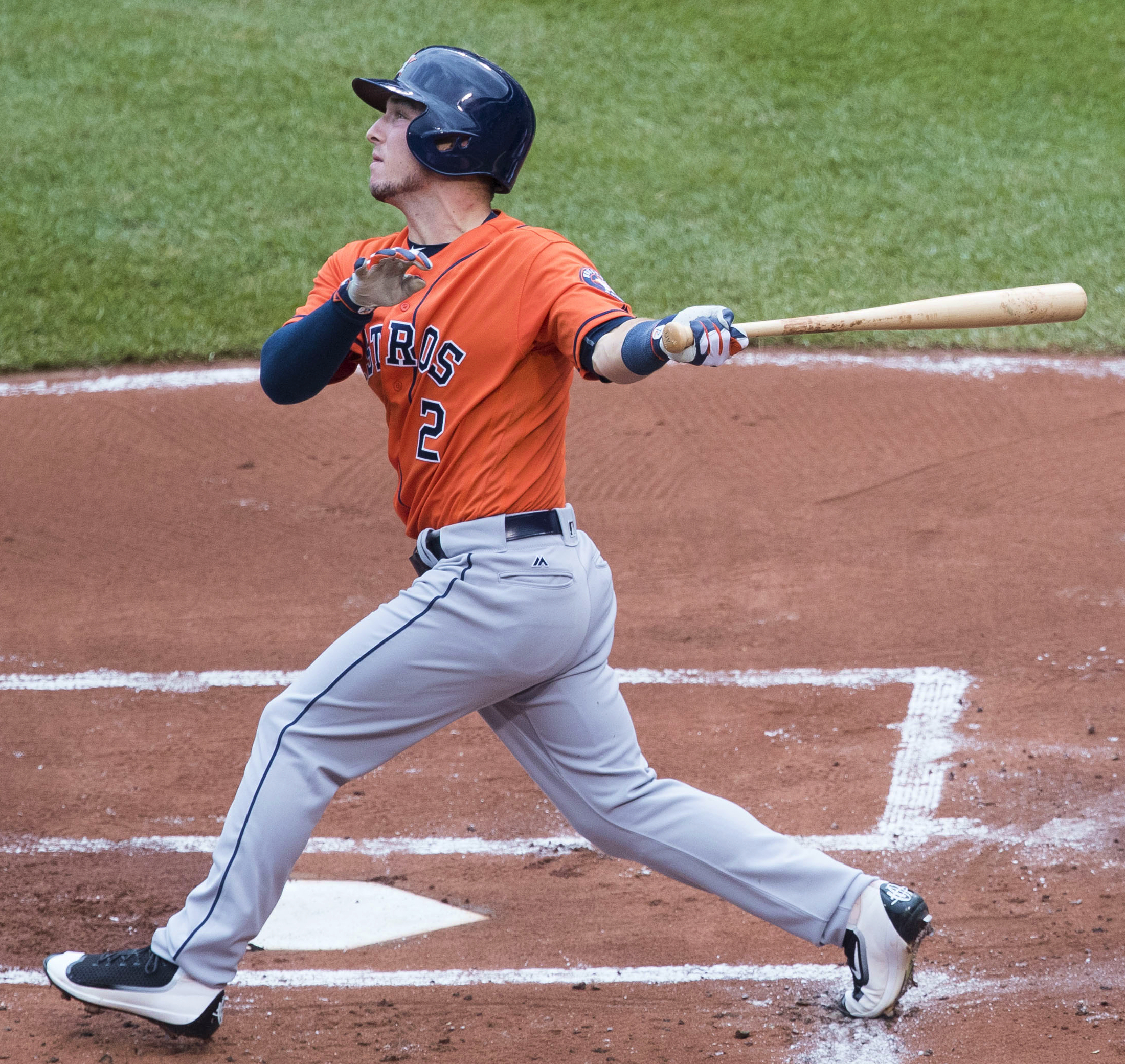
Alex Bregman hit the deciding 3-run home run in Game 2.

October 20, 2022 6:37 pm (CDT) at Minute Maid Park in Houston, Texas 76 °F (24 °C), roof open, clear
Team	1	2	3	4	5	6	7	8	9	R	H	E
New York	0	0	0	2	0	0	0	0	0	2	4	0
Houston	0	0	3	0	0	0	0	0	X	3	8	2
WP: Framber Valdez (1–0) LP: Luis Severino (0–1) Sv: Ryan Pressly (2); Home runs: NYY: None; HOU: Alex Bregman (1); Attendance: 41,700; Boxscore

In contrast to Game 1, the roof of Minute Maid Park was open as Framber Valdez of the Astros squared off against Luis Severino of the Yankees to kick off Game 2. Alex Bregman started the scoring in the third with a two-out three-run homer off of Severino to jump the Astros out to a 3–0 lead. The Yankees answered back the following inning, capitalizing on an Aaron Judge single and a throwing error by Valdez on a Giancarlo Stanton grounder that put runners at second and third. Anthony Rizzo drove in a run with a fielder's choice groundout, and Gleyber Torres drove in another run on an infield single to bring the game to 3–2. Valdez recovered to end the inning and finished his night by striking out nine through seven innings of two-run baseball. Severino went 5 1/3 innings, striking out six and giving up three runs. In the eighth with a runner on, Judge hit what looked to be a go-ahead two-run homer off of reliever Bryan Abreu, but the wind blowing in from the open roof kept the ball in the park as Kyle Tucker caught it at the warning track. Prior to the bottom of the 9th inning, a fan (wearing a Craig Biggio jersey) ran onto the field and got on his knees to hug Astros second baseman Jose Altuve prior to security apprehending the fan. Ryan Pressly came in again in the ninth to close out his second save of the series, striking out Matt Carpenter on a check swing to end the game and give the Astros a 2–0 series lead heading to New York.

=== Game 3 ===
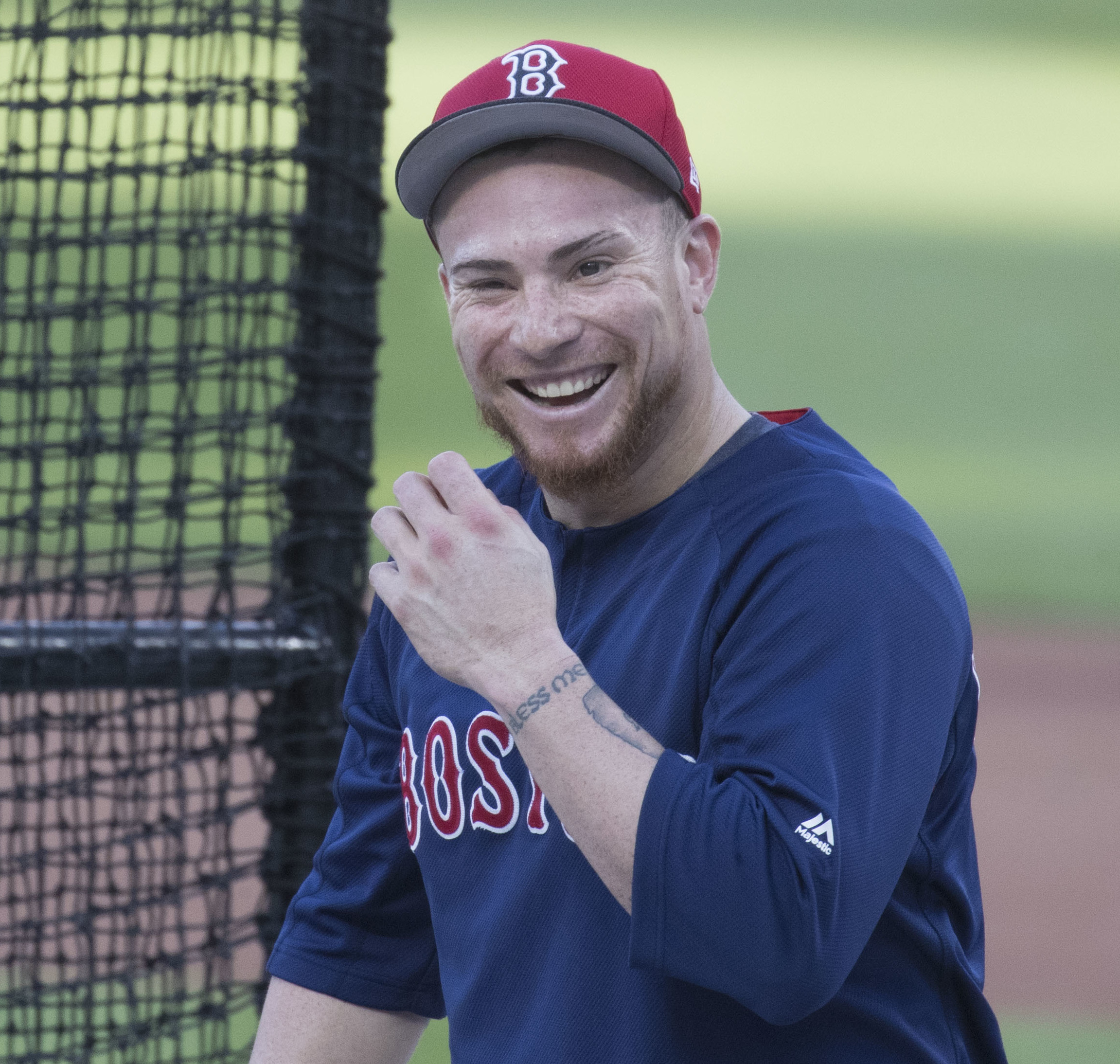
Christian Vázquez (pictured here with the Red Sox) had 2 RBI and threw a runner out in Game 3.

October 22, 2022 5:07 pm (EDT) at Yankee Stadium in The Bronx, New York 67 °F (19 °C), partly cloudy
Team	1	2	3	4	5	6	7	8	9	R	H	E
Houston	0	2	0	0	0	3	0	0	0	5	6	0
New York	0	0	0	0	0	0	0	0	0	0	3	1
WP: Cristian Javier (1–0) LP: Gerrit Cole (0–1); Home runs: HOU: Chas McCormick (2); NYY: None; Attendance: 47,569; Boxscore

The series moved to Yankee Stadium in The Bronx for Game 3, making it the first ALCS game in New York since 2019. Gerrit Cole made his third postseason start of the year for the Yankees. Cristian Javier, who had pitched in a combined no-hitter at Yankee Stadium in June, made the first postseason start of his career for the Astros. In the top of the second inning, Christian Vázquez hit a fly-ball to centerfield that ended up being dropped by Harrison Bader after a cross-up with Aaron Judge. The error extended the inning and led to Chas McCormick hitting a two-run home run off Cole to give the Astros the early lead. In the fifth, Jose Altuve hit a double to snap an 0-for-25 streak to start the playoffs, the longest in major league history. In the sixth, after Cole was taken out with the bases loaded and no outs and replaced by Lou Trivino, Alex Bregman scored on a sacrifice fly by Trey Mancini, followed by a two-run single by Vázquez to widen the Astros' lead 5–0. Javier was removed from the game in the bottom of the sixth with one out after walking Anthony Rizzo. Héctor Neris relieved Javier, getting outs against Aaron Judge and Giancarlo Stanton to preserve the shutout. After the exit of both starters, neither team recorded a hit until the bottom of the ninth when Matt Carpenter and Harrison Bader recorded back-to-back two-out singles. Astros reliever Bryan Abreu extinguished the threat with a three-pitch strikeout of Josh Donaldson to end the game. The Astros' shutout of the Yankees gave them a 3–0 series advantage, creating a win-or-go-home situation for New York in Game 4.

=== Game 4 ===
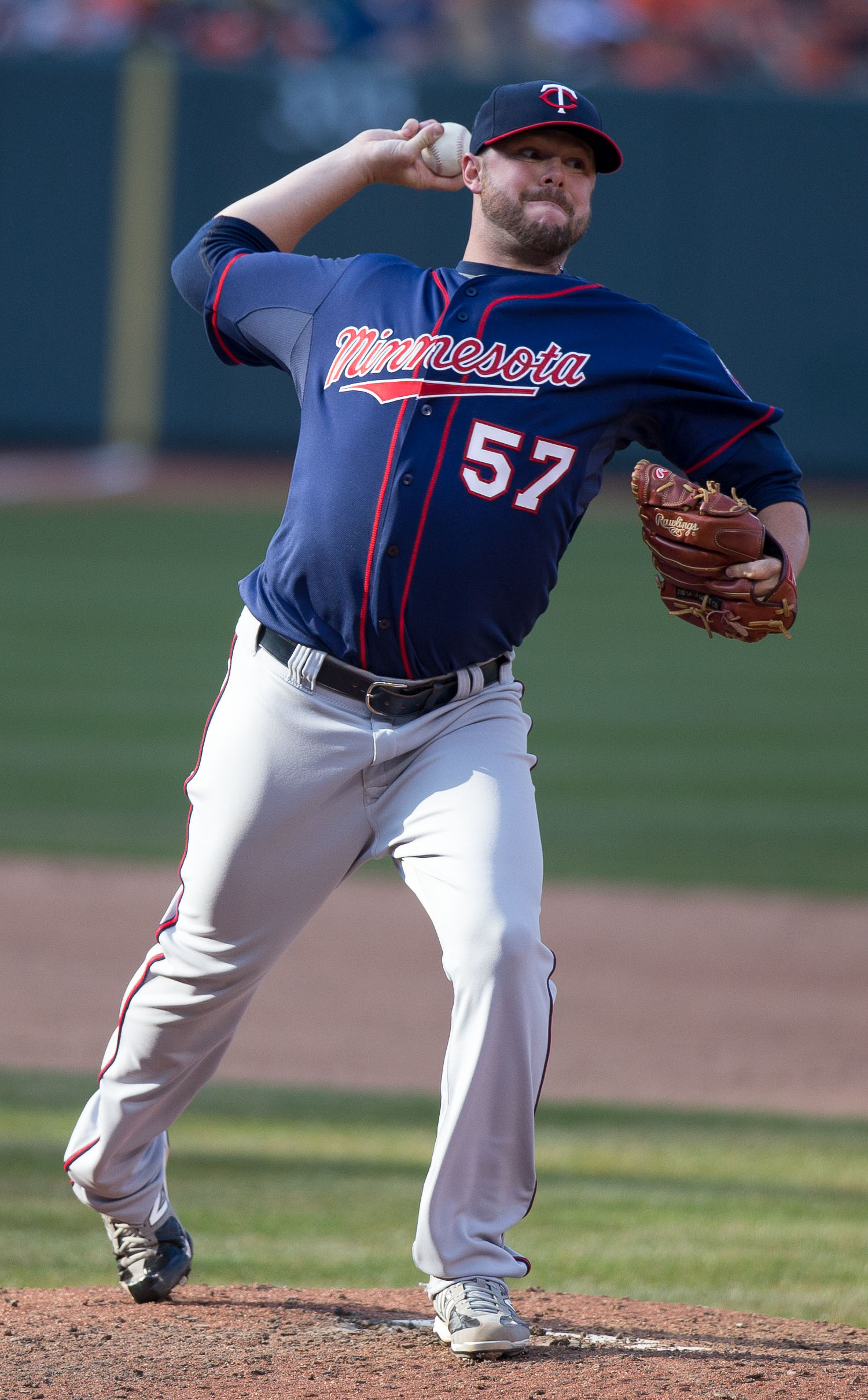
Ryan Pressly (pictured here with the Twins) pitched a perfect ninth for his third save of the series in Game 4.

October 23, 2022 8:30 pm (EDT) at Yankee Stadium in The Bronx, New York 57 °F (14 °C), cloudy
Team	1	2	3	4	5	6	7	8	9	R	H	E
Houston	0	0	4	0	0	0	2	0	0	6	9	0
New York	2	1	0	1	0	1	0	0	0	5	9	1
WP: Héctor Neris (1–0) LP: Jonathan Loáisiga (0–1) Sv: Ryan Pressly (3); Home runs: HOU: Jeremy Peña (2); NYY: Harrison Bader (2); Attendance: 46,545; Boxscore

After a rain delay, the game commenced with first-time All-Star Nestor Cortés Jr. starting for the Yankees and Lance McCullers Jr. starting for the Astros. In the bottom of the first inning, Harrison Bader scored with an RBI single by Giancarlo Stanton, putting the Yankees in a lead at 1–0, followed by another RBI single by Gleyber Torres to let Anthony Rizzo score another run, extending the Yankees' lead at 2–0. In the bottom of the second inning, Isiah Kiner-Falefa scored with an RBI double by Anthony Rizzo, extending the Yankees' lead to 3–0. In the top of the third inning, Jeremy Peña hit a three-run home run off Nestor Cortés Jr., tying the Astros at 3–3. Yordan Alvarez later scored on an RBI single by Yuli Gurriel in that inning, putting the Astros in the lead at 4–3. In the bottom of the fourth inning, Harrison Bader scored on an RBI single by Anthony Rizzo, tying the Yankees at 4–4. In the bottom of the sixth, Bader hit a solo home run to give the Yankees a 5–4 lead. The lead was brief. With Jonathan Loáisiga on the mound, Jose Altuve hit a single to reach base in the seventh inning with one out. Jeremy Peña then hit a groundball to second baseman Gleyber Torres, who tried to throw to shortstop Isiah Kiner-Falefa for a potential out, but the throw went away from Falefa, leading to two men on base. Yordan Alvarez then hit a line-drive RBI single to right field to tie the game before Loáisiga was taken out for Clay Holmes. Alex Bregman then hit an RBI single to drive in Peña to make it 6–5. Ryan Pressly ended the game with a clean save as Houston advanced to their fourth World Series in six seasons. They became the first American League team to win back-to-back American League pennants since the 2014-15 Kansas City Royals and the first AL team to win four pennants in a six-season span since the 1998-2003 New York Yankees.

With the series win, Houston was the first team ever to beat the Yankees in the postseason on four separate occasions, doing so in the span of seven years by beating New York in 2015, 2017, 2019, and now 2022; in the four combined matchups from 2015 to 2022, the Astros won 13 of 18 postseason games against the Yankees. The Yankees, with losses in the ALCS in 2010, 2012, 2017, 2019, and 2022, became the first team to lose in the LCS five straight times.

This was the first four-game sweep of the Yankees since the 2012 American League Championship Series, and it is also the first time that the Astros have swept an opponent in a best-of-seven game series. In the series, pending free agent and MVP Aaron Judge went 1-for-16 with four strikeouts and one walk in the four-game sweep, capping off a nightmarish end to a 62 home run season.

Jeremy Peña, who went 6-for-17 in the ALCS with two home runs and four RBIs, was named ALCS MVP.

=== Composite line score ===
2022 ALCS (4–0): Houston Astros beat New York Yankees

Team	1	2	3	4	5	6	7	8	9	R	H	E
New York Yankees	2	2	0	3	0	1	0	1	0	9	21	2
Houston Astros	0	3	7	0	0	5	3	0	0	18	30	3
Total attendance: 177,661 Average attendance: 44,415

== See also ==
- 2022 National League Championship Series
- Astros–Yankees rivalry
