= Oscar González (baseball) =

Dominican baseball player (born 1998)

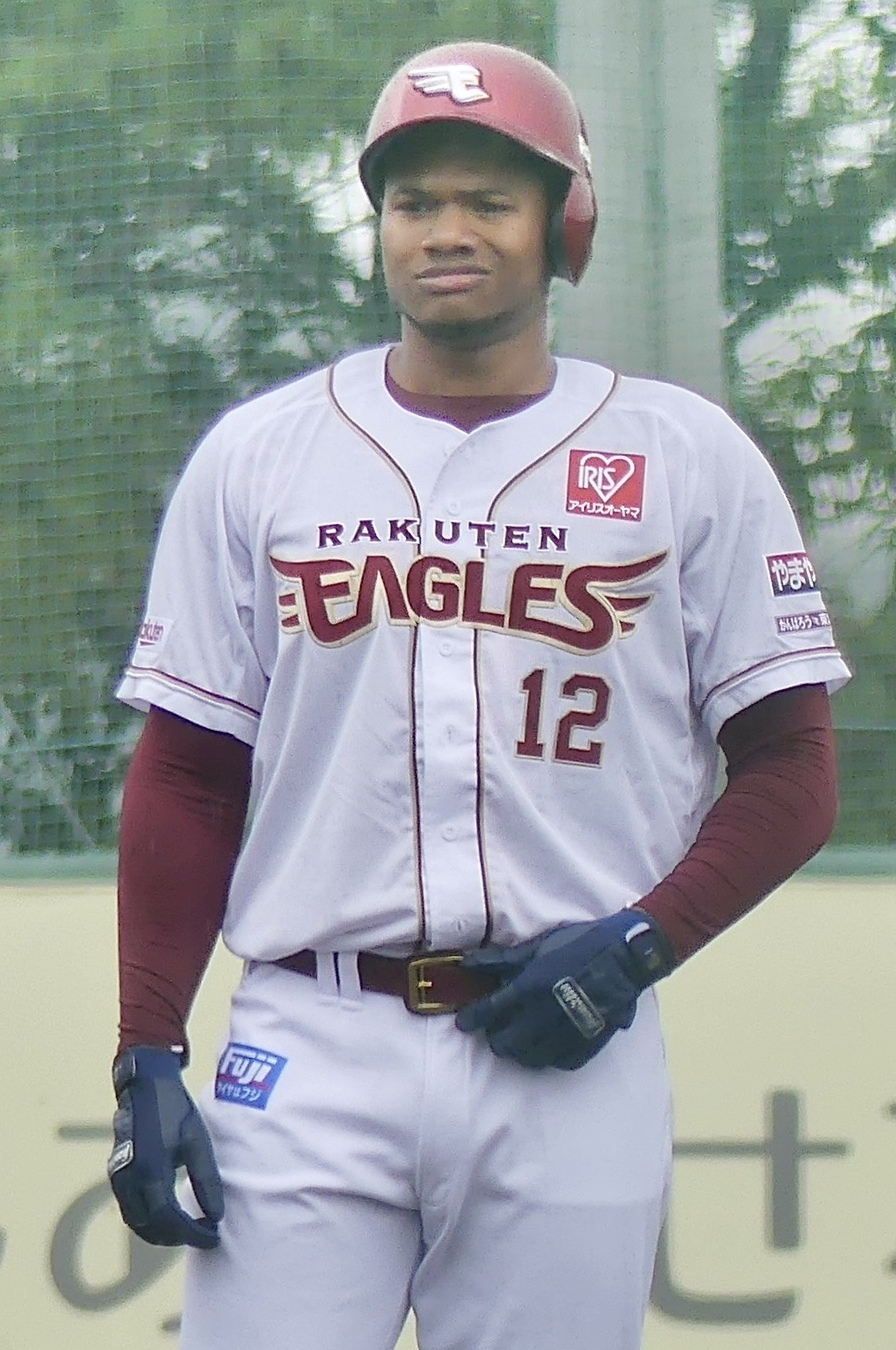
- González with the Tohoku Rakuten Golden Eagles in 2025

Olmecas de Tabasco – No. 19
- Outfielder
- Born: January 10, 1998 (age 28); Sabana Grande de Palenque, Dominican Republic
- Bats: Right Throws: Right

Professional debut
- MLB: May 26, 2022, for the Cleveland Guardians
- NPB: June 10, 2025, for the Tohoku Rakuten Golden Eagles

MLB statistics (through 2025 season)
- Batting average: .267
- Home runs: 13
- Runs batted in: 59

NPB statistics (through 2026 season)
- Batting average: .225
- Home runs: 4
- Runs batted in: 19
- Stats at Baseball Reference

Teams
- Cleveland Guardians (2022–2023); San Diego Padres (2025); Tohoku Rakuten Golden Eagles (2025–2026)

Oscar Luis González (born January 10, 1998) is a Dominican professional baseball Outfielder for the Olmecas de Tabasco of the Mexican League. He has previously played in Major League Baseball (MLB) for the Cleveland Guardians and San Diego Padres. He has also played in Nippon Professional Baseball (NPB) for the Tohoku Rakuten Golden Eagles. González made his MLB debut in 2022.

== Professional career ==
=== Cleveland Indians / Guardians ===
==== Minor leagues ====
González signed as an international free agent with the Cleveland Indians on July 2, 2014, for a $300,000 signing bonus. He played for the Dominican Summer League Indians in 2015, hitting .203/.266/.324 with four home runs and 38 runs batted in.

González split the 2016 season between the rookie-level Arizona League Indians and Low-A Mahoning Valley Scrappers, hitting a combined .297/.340/.554 with 8 home runs and 26 runs batted in. He was named the 2016 Arizona League Most Valuable Player. González spent the 2017 season with Mahoning Valley, hitting .283/.301/.388 with three home runs and 34 runs batted in.

González spent the 2018 season with the Single-A Lake County Captains, hitting .292/.310/.435 with 13 home runs and 52 runs batted in. He split the 2019 season between the High-A Lynchburg Hillcats and Double-A Akron RubberDucks, hitting a combined .293/.315/.418 with 9 home runs and 70 runs batted in. González did not play in a game in 2020 due to the cancellation of the minor league season because of the COVID-19 pandemic.

González split the 2021 season between Akron and the Triple-A Columbus Clippers. In 121 appearances for the two affiliates, he batted a combined .293/.329/.542 with 31 home runs and 83 RBI. González elected free agency following the season on November 7, 2021, and re-signed with the Indians to a minor league contract the same day.

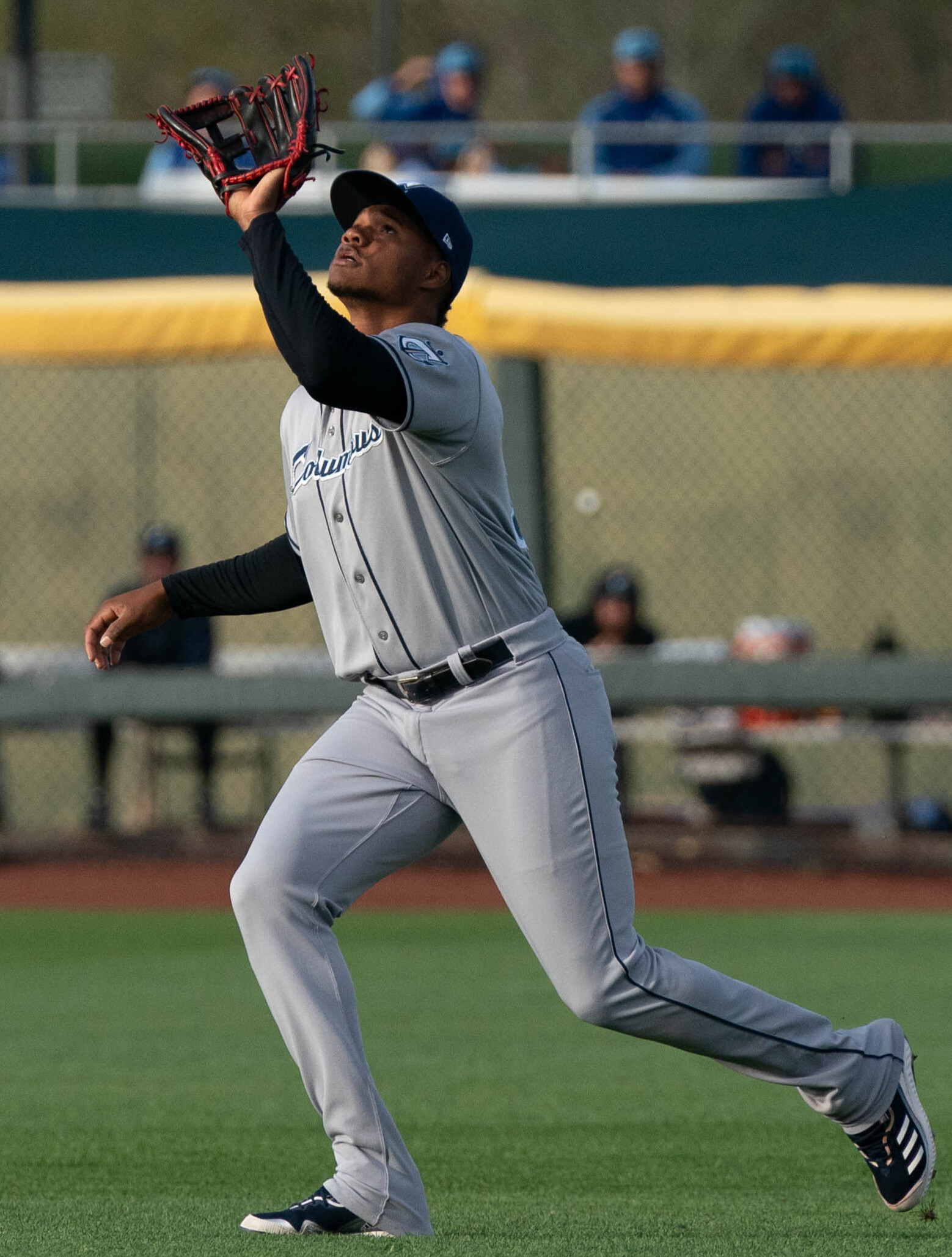
González with Columbus in 2022

==== Major leagues ====
The Guardians selected González's contract on May 26, 2022. He made his major league debut that day, starting in right field against the Detroit Tigers at Comerica Park. He singled on a line drive to center field off starting pitcher Tarik Skubal in the top of the second for his first hit. In the ninth inning, he hit his first major league double. On June 9, against the Oakland Athletics, González achieved his first major league four-hit game. He had his only other four-hit game three months later. He became the Guardians' starting right fielder by the end of the regular season. González's walk-up song was the SpongeBob SquarePants theme song, chosen because "deep inside I feel like a kid". On June 19, González hit his first career home run off of Los Angeles Dodgers starter Andrew Heaney.

On October 8, 2022, González hit a walk-off home run in the bottom of the 15th inning of the American League Wild Card Series to send the Guardians to the American League Division Series against the New York Yankees. In the bottom of the 9th inning of Game 3 of the ALDS, with the bases loaded and two outs, González hit a walk-off single to give the Guardians a 2–1 series lead. The Guardians would lose the series in 5 games. During the 2022 playoffs, Gonzalez hit .226 with 4 runs batted in and 1 home run.

González did not carry over from his strong rookie season into 2023. He batted .214/.239/.312 and despite playing in only 54 games ranked as one of the worst players in baseball according to FanGraphs' Wins Above Replacement.

=== New York Yankees ===
On December 1, 2023, Gonzalez was claimed off waivers by the New York Yankees. However, on January 17, 2024, he was designated for assignment after the signing of Marcus Stroman was made official. On January 24, González cleared waivers and was sent outright to the Triple-A Scranton/Wilkes-Barre RailRiders. On March 26, during a spring training game, González fouled a ball off of his face and was later diagnosed with an orbital fracture. He began the season on the injured list as a result of the injury and was activated on April 30. In 78 games for Scranton, he slashed .294/.333/.469 with 8 home runs, 45 RBI, and seven stolen bases. González elected free agency following the season on November 4.

=== San Diego Padres ===
On November 26, 2024, González signed a minor league contract with the San Diego Padres. He began the season in Triple-A but joined the Padres on April 7. He batted .303 with one double in his first 12 games before slumping, batting .115 in his subsequent 9 games. He was released on May 19, so he could pursue an opportunity in Japan.

=== Tohoku Rakuten Golden Eagles ===
On May 22, 2025, González signed a two-year, $2 million contract with the Tohoku Rakuten Golden Eagles of Nippon Professional Baseball. He played in 53 games, batting .229/.250/.323 with four home runs and 19 RBI. In 2026, he spent the majority of the season on the farm team, only appearing in four NPB games. On May 28, 2026, he was placed on waivers by the Eagles, and became a free agent on June 4 after going unclaimed.

=== Olmecas de Tabasco ===
On July 7, 2026, González signed with the Olmecas de Tabasco of the Mexican League.

== See also ==
- List of Major League Baseball players from the Dominican Republic
