= 2023 American League Championship Series =

Team (Wins)	Managers	Season
Texas Rangers (4)	Bruce Bochy	90–72 (.556), GB: 0
Houston Astros (3)	Dusty Baker	90–72 (.556), GA: 0
- Dates: October 15–23
- MVP: Adolis García (Texas)
- Umpires: Jordan Baker, Dan Bellino, Doug Eddings, James Hoye (crew chief), Marvin Hudson, Mark Ripperger, Stu Scheurwater

Broadcast
- Television: Fox (Games 1–2, 7); FS1 (Games 2–7)
- TV announcers: Joe Davis, John Smoltz, Ken Rosenthal, and Tom Verducci
- Radio: ESPN
- Radio announcers: Karl Ravech, Eduardo Pérez, and Tim Kurkjian
- ALDS: Texas Rangers over Baltimore Orioles (3–0); Houston Astros over Minnesota Twins (3–1)

The 2023 American League Championship Series (ALCS) was the best-of-seven playoff in Major League Baseball's 2023 postseason between the defending World Series champion and second-seeded Houston Astros and the fifth-seeded Texas Rangers for the American League (AL) pennant and the right to play in the 2023 World Series. The Rangers won the series four games to three. The visiting team won every game in the seven-game series, making this the second such occurrence in North American professional sports after the 2019 World Series (also featuring the Astros).

The series began on October 15 and Game 7 was played on October 23. Fox and FS1 televised all games in the United States. It was the first-ever postseason meeting between the intra-state rivals, and the first LCS for either league to be played entirely within one state (apart from the neutral-site matchups of the 2020 postseason, which were necessitated by the COVID-19 pandemic).

Following the eliminations of division winners Baltimore Orioles (AL East), Minnesota Twins (AL Central), Los Angeles Dodgers (NL West), and Atlanta Braves (NL East) in the Division Series, and Milwaukee Brewers (NL Central) in the Wild Card Series, the Astros (AL West) were the only division winner to reach the League Championship Series in the 2023 season.

The Rangers would go on to defeat the Arizona Diamondbacks in the 2023 World Series in five games for their first title in franchise history.

== Background ==
Both the Houston Astros and the Texas Rangers qualified for the postseason and finished the regular season 90–72, but the Astros won American League West for the third consecutive season, the sixth title in seven years, and a first-round bye as the second seed, all on the final day of the season by winning the head-to-head tiebreaker 9–4 while the Rangers entered as the fifth seed wild card entrant as second place in the American League West division despite leading the division most of the season.

For the Rangers, they swept the Tampa Bay Rays in the Wild Card Series; and in the Division Series, they swept the American League East division winner Baltimore Orioles to reach the American League Championship Series for the first time since 2011. The Houston Astros, meanwhile, defeated the American League Central division winner Minnesota Twins in four games in the Division Series for their seventh consecutive appearance in the ALCS, an American League record.

This series will be the first postseason meeting between the Astros and the Rangers, a rivalry known as the Lone Star Series, the first LCS to feature two teams from the same state, and the first ALCS not to feature a team from the AL East since 2011. This is also the first LCS matchup between two teams from the same division since 2011.

During the regular season, the Astros won nine of 13 head-to-head meetings with the Rangers and out-scored them 93–74 in those contests. While both teams had 90–72 records, the Rangers had the superior run differential (plus-165 to Houston's plus-129).

In addition, the mayors of Houston and Arlington made a friendly wager that whichever mayor’s team lost the series would have to wear a jersey from the winning team to a city council meeting.

== Summary ==
=== Texas Rangers vs Houston Astros ===
Texas won the series, 4–3.

Game	Date	Score	Location	Time	Attendance
1	October 15	Texas Rangers – 2, Houston Astros – 0	Minute Maid Park	2:49	42,872
2	October 16	Texas Rangers – 5, Houston Astros – 4	Minute Maid Park	3:01	42,879
3	October 18	Houston Astros – 8, Texas Rangers – 5	Globe Life Field	3:05	42,368
4	October 19	Houston Astros – 10, Texas Rangers – 3	Globe Life Field	3:14	42,060
5	October 20	Houston Astros – 5, Texas Rangers – 4	Globe Life Field	3:14	41,519
6	October 22	Texas Rangers – 9, Houston Astros – 2	Minute Maid Park	3:07	42,368
7	October 23	Texas Rangers – 11, Houston Astros – 4	Minute Maid Park	3:20	42,814

== Game summaries ==
This was the first postseason meeting between Texas and Houston.

=== Game 1 ===
October 15, 2023 7:16 pm (CDT) at Minute Maid Park in Houston, Texas 73 °F (23 °C), Roof Closed
Team	1	2	3	4	5	6	7	8	9	R	H	E
Texas	0	1	0	0	1	0	0	0	0	2	6	0
Houston	0	0	0	0	0	0	0	0	0	0	5	0
WP: Jordan Montgomery (1–0) LP: Justin Verlander (0–1) Sv: José Leclerc (1); Home runs: TEX: Leody Taveras (1); HOU: None; Attendance: 42,872; Boxscore

Game 1 was a pitching duel between Houston ace Justin Verlander and Texas' Jordan Montgomery. Jonah Heim's single opened up the scoring as he plated Evan Carter to give the Rangers a 1–0 lead against Astros starter, Justin Verlander. After walking Leody Taveras, Verlander escaped the bases-loaded jam when Marcus Semien popped out. In the fourth, Montgomery struck out Martin Maldonado to escape a bases-loaded jam and preserve the one-run lead. In the fifth, the Rangers extended their lead to 2–0 due to a solo home run by Taveras. After Montgomery's stellar start of 6 1/3 innings, the trio of Josh Sborz, Aroldis Chapman, and José Leclerc kept the Astros off the board to take the first game of the best-of-seven series.

=== Game 2 ===
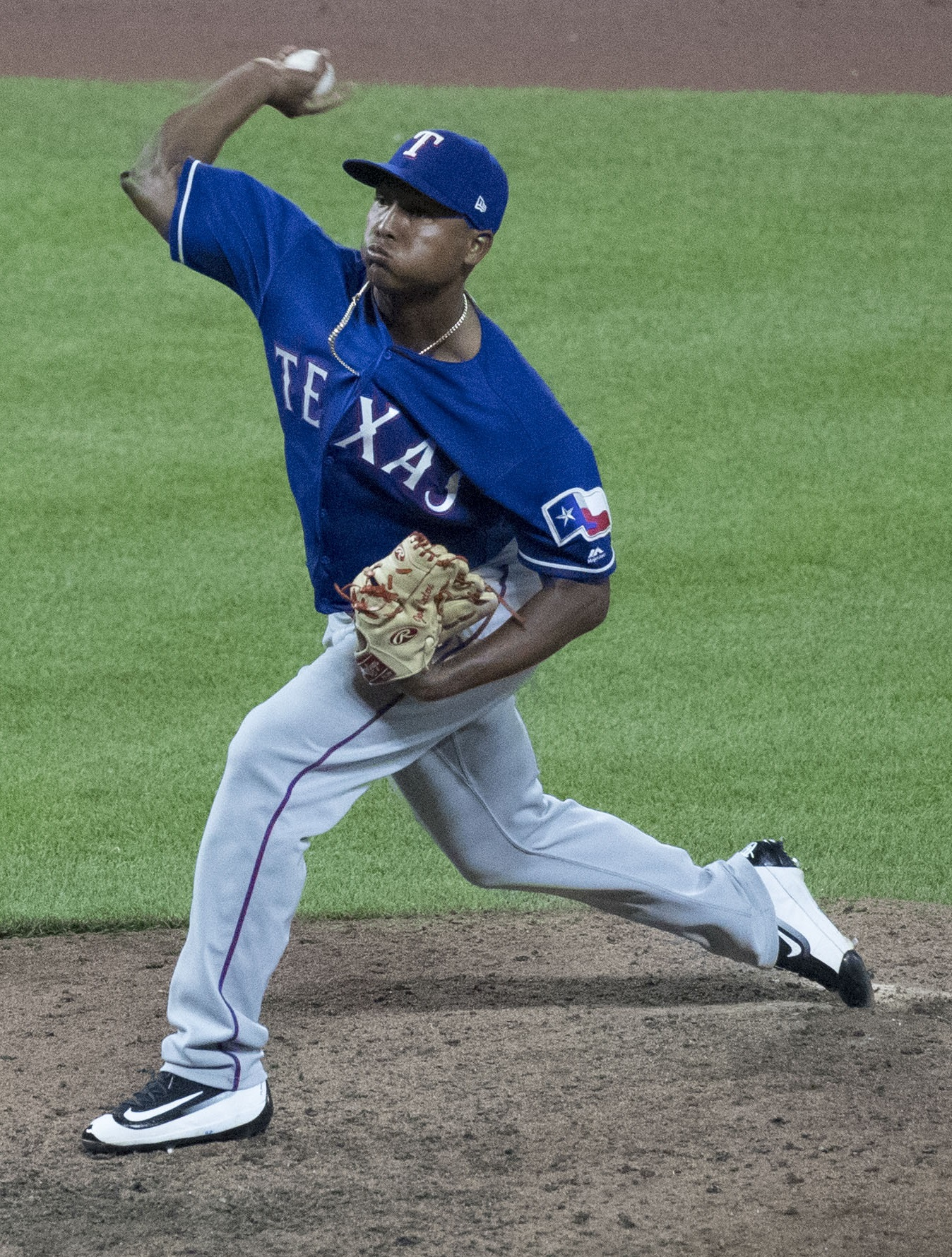
José Leclerc recorded the save for Texas in Game 2.

October 16, 2023 3:39 pm (CDT) at Minute Maid Park in Houston, Texas 73 °F (23 °C), Roof Closed
Team	1	2	3	4	5	6	7	8	9	R	H	E
Texas	4	0	1	0	0	0	0	0	0	5	8	1
Houston	0	1	0	1	0	1	0	1	0	4	6	2
WP: Nathan Eovaldi (1–0) LP: Framber Valdez (0–1) Sv: José Leclerc (2); Home runs: TEX: Jonah Heim (1); HOU: Yordan Alvarez 2 (2), Alex Bregman (1); Attendance: 42,879; Boxscore

Game 2 had starters Nathan Eovaldi on the bump for the Rangers and Framber Valdez for the Astros. On the first two pitches of the game, Valdez gave up singles to Marcus Semien and Corey Seager. Robbie Grossman then reached base on a throwing error from Valdez, scoring Semien. Adolis García, Mitch Garver, and Nathaniel Lowe all hit run-scoring singles in the inning, bringing the score to 4–0. Yordan Alvarez hit a solo home run in the second to put Houston on the board. In the third, Jonah Heim added to the Rangers lead with a solo homer of his own. Alex Bregman homered off the left field foul pole in the fourth to cut the Rangers lead to three. In the bottom of the fifth, the Astros loaded the bases with no outs off two singles and a Josh Jung fielding error that allowed Jeremy Peña to reach base. However, Eovaldi retired the next three batters to get out of the jam. With two outs in the bottom of the sixth, Michael Brantley doubled in Alvarez to bring Houston within two runs. Eovaldi was able to limit the damage by striking out Chas McCormick. Josh Sborz replaced Eovaldi in the top of the seventh and retired the side. In the eighth, Alvarez hit his second home run of the day off Aroldis Chapman, cutting the Rangers lead to one and taking Chapman out of the game. Chapman's replacement, closer José Leclerc, walked the next two batters but retired McCormick for the third out. The Rangers did not score in the ninth and Leclerc retired the side to close out the victory for the Rangers and give them a 2–0 lead as the series shifted to Globe Life Field.

=== Game 3 ===
October 18, 2023 7:03 pm (CDT) at Globe Life Field in Arlington, Texas 74 °F (23 °C), Roof Closed
Team	1	2	3	4	5	6	7	8	9	R	H	E
Houston	0	3	1	1	0	0	2	1	0	8	12	0
Texas	0	0	0	0	2	0	2	1	0	5	6	0
WP: Cristian Javier (1–0) LP: Max Scherzer (0–1) Sv: Ryan Pressly (1); Home runs: HOU: Jose Altuve (1); TEX: Josh Jung 2 (2); Attendance: 42,368; Boxscore

Cristian Javier was matched against Max Scherzer, with the latter making his first start since September 12 after having suffered a low-grade strain of his teres major muscle. After a scoreless first, the Astros loaded the bases with two outs in the top of the second. Facing Martín Maldonado, Scherzer threw a wild pitch that scored Yordan Alvarez from third. Later, Maldonado singled to score Kyle Tucker and Mauricio Dubón, extending the Astros lead to 3–0. In the top of the third, Jose Altuve homered off Scherzer to extend the Astros lead to four. In the fourth, Dubón singled to score Jose Abreu, giving Houston a five-run lead. The Rangers got on the board on a Josh Jung two-run homer in the fifth. Rangers center fielder Leody Taveras robbed Alvarez of a home run to open the sixth inning. In the top of the seventh inning, with runners on base, Alvarez singled off Will Smith to score Maldonado and Altuve, extending the Astros lead to 7–2. In the bottom of that inning, Jung hit a two-run home run, his second of the night, to narrow the Rangers deficit to three runs. In the eighth, Jeremy Peña's run-scoring single extended the Astros lead to 8–4. In the bottom of that inning, Adolis Garcia singled off reliever Bryan Abreu to score Marcus Semien, making the Rangers trail 8–5. Ryan Pressly closed out the win in Game 3 as the Astros narrowed the series deficit to 2–1.

=== Game 4 ===
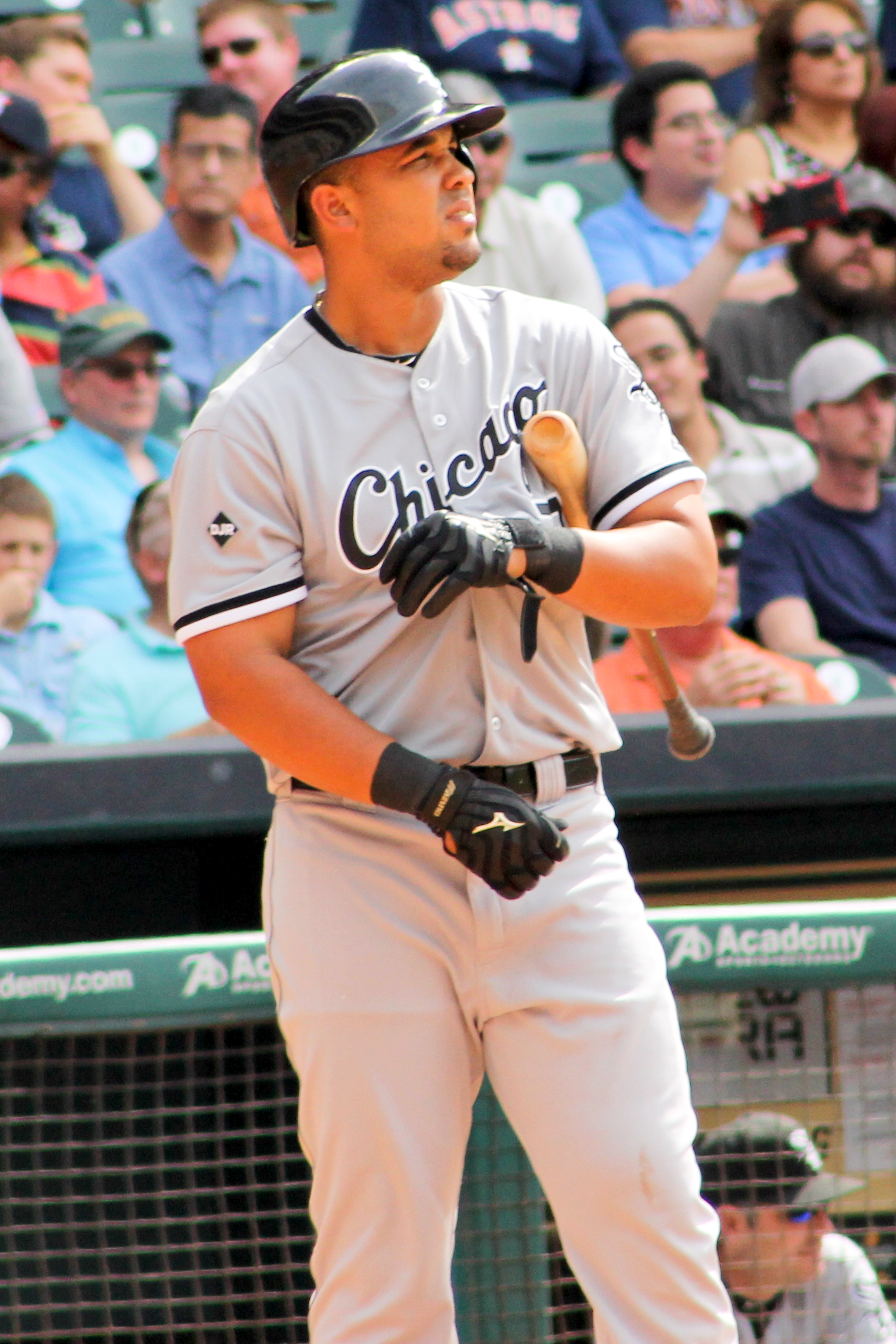
Jose Abreu, pictured with the Chicago White Sox, hit a three-run home run for Houston in Game 4.

October 19, 2023 7:03 pm (CDT) at Globe Life Field in Arlington, Texas 78 °F (26 °C), Clear
Team	1	2	3	4	5	6	7	8	9	R	H	E
Houston	3	0	0	4	0	0	2	1	0	10	11	0
Texas	0	2	1	0	0	0	0	0	0	3	8	0
WP: Ryne Stanek (1–0) LP: Dane Dunning (0–1); Home runs: HOU: José Abreu (1), Chas McCormick (1); TEX: Adolis García (1), Corey Seager (1); Attendance: 42,060; Boxscore

Game 4 marked Jose Altuve playing his 100th career postseason game, the seventh player in Major League history to do so. José Urquidy was matched against Andrew Heaney, but neither would reach the fourth inning. In the top of the first inning, Alex Bregman tripled off Andrew Heaney to score Jose Altuve and Mauricio Dubón. Then, Yordan Alvarez singled in Alex Bregman, extending the Astros lead to three. Andrew Heaney was taken out for Dane Dunning after getting only two outs. With the bases loaded, Dunning struck out Martin Maldonado to escape the bases-loaded jam. In the bottom of the second inning, Adolis García homered off José Urquidy to put the Rangers on the board 3–1. Then, Mitch Garver scored on a sacrifice fly by Josh Jung to cut the Rangers deficit to 3–2. In the bottom of the third inning, Corey Seager hit a solo home run to tie the game 3–3. In the fourth, with the bases loaded, Maldonado scored on a sacrifice fly by Alvarez to put the Astros back in the lead at 4–3. The next batter was José Abreu, who hit a three-run home run to extend the Astros lead to 7–3. In the top of the seventh inning, Chas McCormick hit a two-run home run to extend the Astros lead to 9–3. In the eighth, Alvarez singled in Altuve to extend the Astros lead to 10–3. Rafael Montero closed out the ninth inning without allowing a run to tie the series at two games apiece.

After the game, Ryne Stanek was the winning pitcher of the game throwing just one pitch as a reliever for Urquidy in the bottom of the third that grounded into double play by Mitch Garver.

=== Game 5 ===
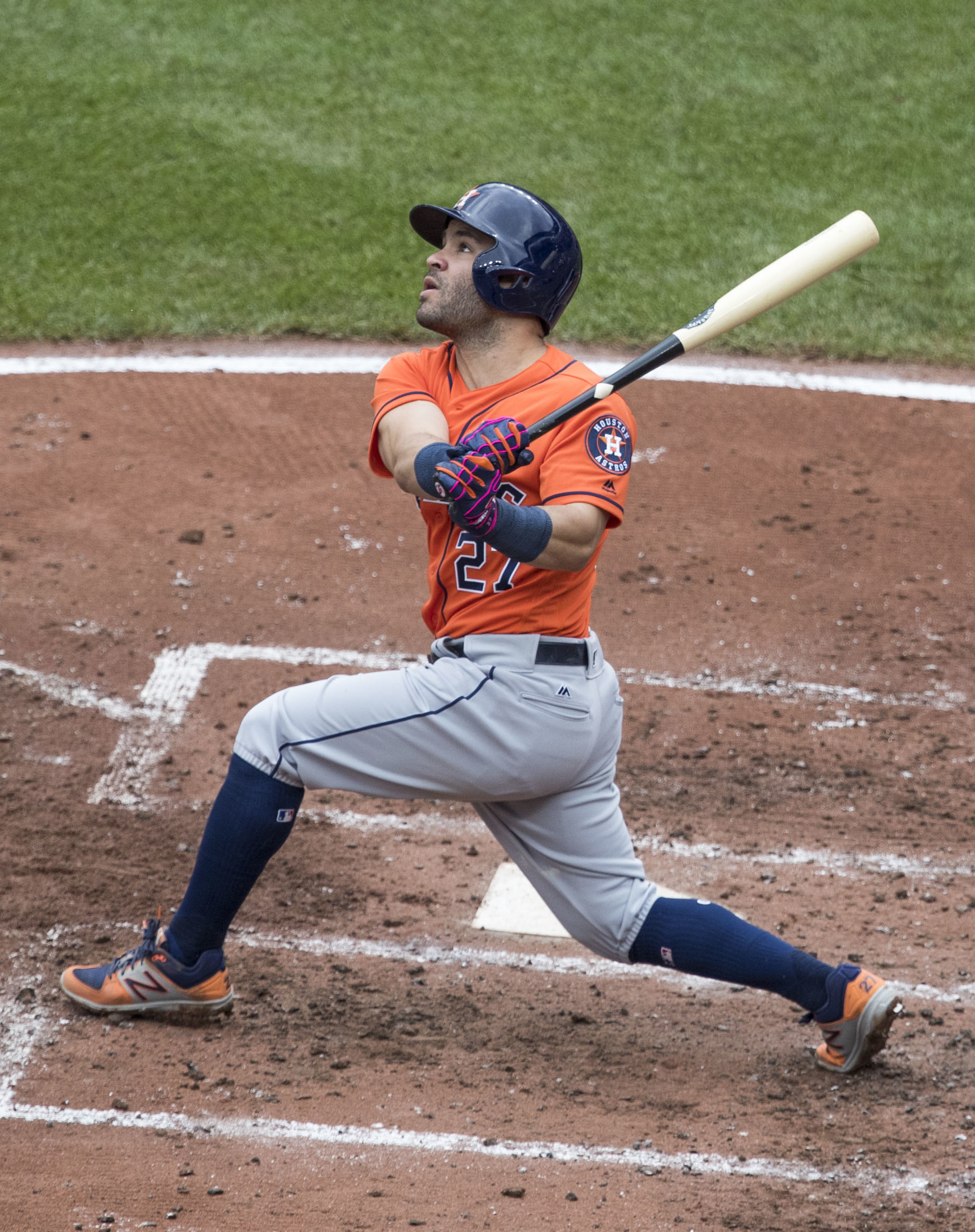
Down 4-2 in the top of the ninth in Game 5, Jose Altuve hit a three-run home run to give Houston the lead.

October 20, 2023 4:07 pm (CDT) at Globe Life Field in Arlington, Texas 74 °F (23 °C), Roof Closed
Team	1	2	3	4	5	6	7	8	9	R	H	E
Houston	1	0	0	0	0	1	0	0	3	5	8	0
Texas	0	0	0	0	1	3	0	0	0	4	8	1
WP: Ryan Pressly (1–0) LP: José Leclerc (0–1); Home runs: HOU: Alex Bregman (2), Jose Altuve (2); TEX: Nathaniel Lowe (1), Adolis García (2); Attendance: 41,519; Boxscore

Game 5 featured a pitching rematch of Game 1 between Jordan Montgomery for the Rangers and Justin Verlander for the Astros. In the top of the first inning, Alex Bregman hit a two-out home run off Montgomery to give the Astros the early 1–0 lead; for the fifth game in a row, the road team scored first in the game. In the bottom of the third inning, after walking Mitch Garver and giving up a base hit to Jonah Heim, Verlander retired Marcus Semien and Corey Seager on two pitches to preserve a one-run lead for the Astros. In the bottom of the fifth inning, Nathaniel Lowe homered off Verlander, to tie the game at one. In the top of the sixth inning, José Abreu hit an RBI single off Montgomery to score Bregman, putting the Astros back in the lead at 2–1. Later that inning, Josh Sborz escaped the one-out bases-loaded jam after Montgomery gave up a run to Bregman on Alvarez's single and walking Kyle Tucker. In the bottom of that inning, Adolis García hit a three-run home run to flip the lead to the Rangers 4–2. In the bottom of the eighth, Garcia was intentionally hit by a pitch by Bryan Abreu, which led to the benches being cleared when García started arguing with catcher Martin Maldonado. Umpire crew chief James Hoye ejected Abreu, García, and Astros manager Dusty Baker as a result. In the top of the ninth, Yainer Diaz and Jon Singleton each came on as pinch-hitters and got on base (the former on a single and the latter on a full-count walk). Jose Altuve then hit a three-run home run off José Leclerc to put the Astros back in the lead at 5–4. Ryan Pressly, who came into the game in the eighth, allowed the first two runners to get on with singles, but from there on he closed out the game for the win, giving Houston a 3–2 edge in the series as the teams head back to Houston. It is the first time since the 2019 World Series that the first five games of a series were all won by the road team.

==== Adolis García hit by pitch and benches-clearing incident ====
In the bottom of the eighth inning, the Rangers held a 4–2 lead with a runner Evan Carter on first base with no outs when Adolis García, following his three-run home run two innings earlier, was hit by a pitch in the left shoulder by Bryan Abreu's 98.9 mph fastball on the first pitch at-bat. This resulted in benches being cleared for an on-field delay of nearly 12 minutes when García confronted catcher Martin Maldonado in an argument while being held off by home plate umpire Marvin Hudson. The benches-clearing incident led to the ejections of Abreu, García, and Astros manager Dusty Baker by umpire Hudson. Following the ejections, Astros closer Ryan Pressly took the mound to replace Abreu, and Travis Jankowski replaced García as a pinch-runner on first base. Following the game, MLB suspended Abreu for two games, which he served at the beginning of the 2024 season.

=== Game 6 ===
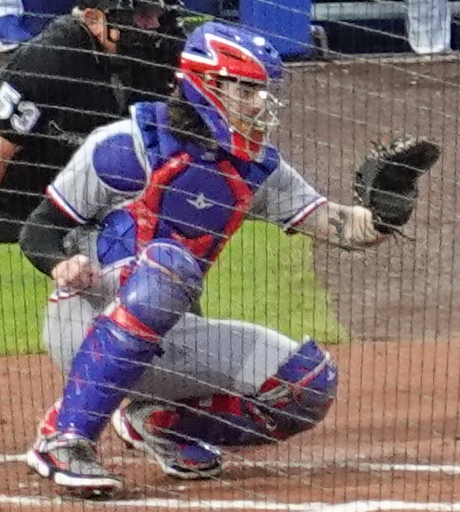
Jonah Heim's two-run home run in the fourth inning of Game 6 gave Texas a lead that they never gave up.

October 22, 2023 7:04 pm (CDT) at Minute Maid Park in Houston, Texas 73 °F (23 °C), Roof Closed
Team	1	2	3	4	5	6	7	8	9	R	H	E
Texas	0	1	0	2	0	0	0	1	5	9	10	0
Houston	1	0	0	0	0	1	0	0	0	2	6	1
WP: Nathan Eovaldi (2–0) LP: Framber Valdez (0–2); Home runs: TEX: Mitch Garver (1), Jonah Heim (2), Adolis García (3); HOU: None; Attendance: 42,368; Boxscore

Game 6 was a must-win for Texas. The game featured a pitching rematch of Game 2 between Framber Valdez for the Houston Astros and Nathan Eovaldi for the Texas Rangers. In the bottom of the first, Yordan Alvarez singled off Eovaldi to score Jose Altuve to put the Astros in the early 1–0 lead. In the top of the second, Mitch Garver homered off Valdez to tie the game at one. In the top of the fourth, Jonah Heim hit a two-run home run over the glove of Kyle Tucker to put the Rangers in the lead at 3–1. In the bottom of the sixth, Alvarez scored on a sacrifice fly by Mauricio Dubón to cut their deficit to 3–2. In the eighth, Garver doubled off Bryan Abreu to score Evan Carter, extending their lead to 4–2. In the bottom half of the eighth, José Leclerc struck out Jon Singleton to escape the bases-loaded jam and preserve the 4–2 lead for the Rangers. In the ninth, with bases loaded with no outs, Ryne Stanek hit Corey Seager with a pitch to score Josh Jung to extend the Rangers lead to 5–2. With the bases still loaded, Adolis García, who was at the center of the bases-clearing brawl two days before, stepped up to the plate. Throughout the game, García had gone 0–4 with four strikeouts. On a 1–1 pitch, García hit a grand slam to left field to give the Rangers a commanding 9–2 lead. Andrew Heaney retired the side in the bottom of the ninth to force a Game 7. It is the first time since the 2019 World Series that the first six games of a series were all won by the road team.

=== Game 7 ===
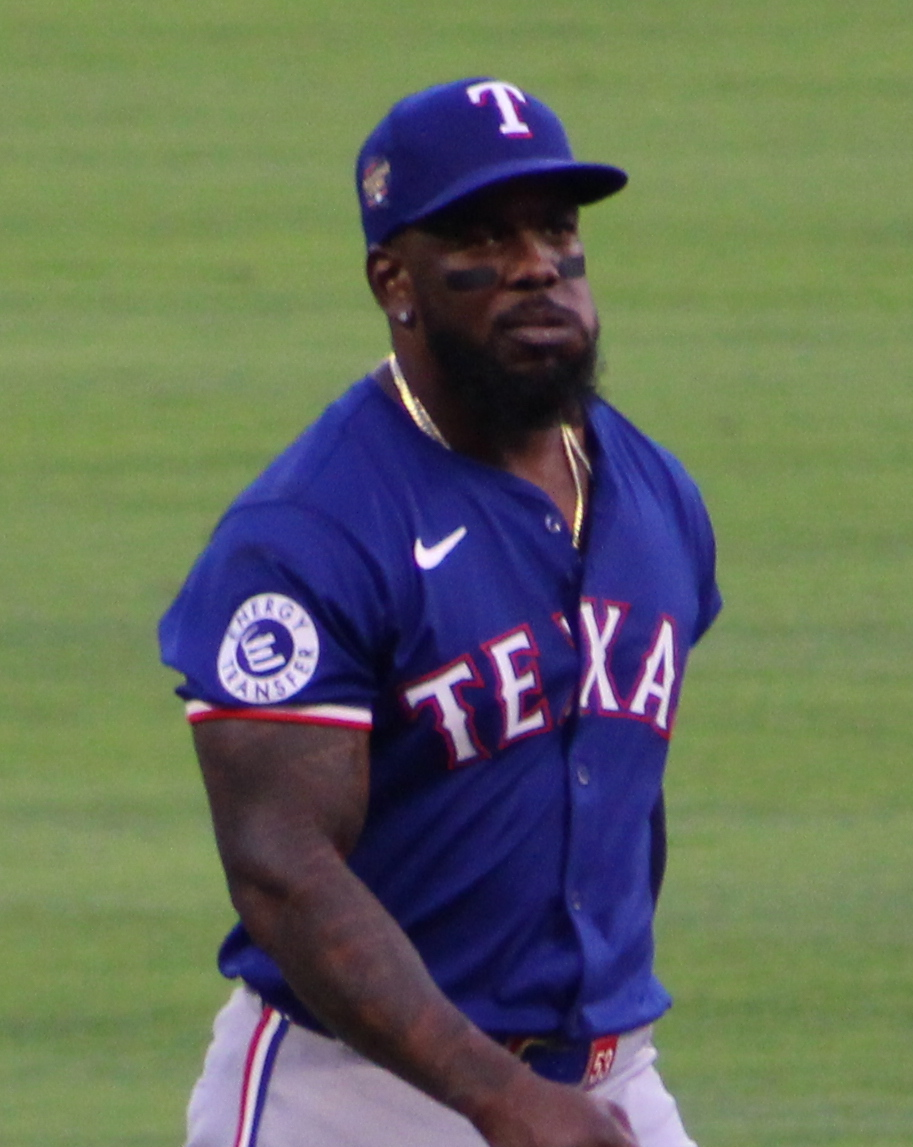
Adolis García hit two home runs and had five RBIs in Game 7. He was crowned ALCS MVP after the game.

October 23, 2023 7:06 pm (CDT) at Minute Maid Park in Houston, Texas 73 °F (23 °C), Roof Closed
Team	1	2	3	4	5	6	7	8	9	R	H	E
Texas	3	0	1	4	0	2	0	1	0	11	15	0
Houston	1	0	1	0	0	0	1	0	1	4	12	0
WP: Jordan Montgomery (2–0) LP: Cristian Javier (1–1); Home runs: TEX: Corey Seager (2), Adolis García 2 (5), Nathaniel Lowe (2); HOU: Alex Bregman (3), Jose Altuve (3); Attendance: 42,814; Boxscore

This was the first League Championship Series to reach a winner-take-all Game 7 since the 2020 ALCS, which Houston lost to the Tampa Bay Rays after losing the first three games. This was the first Game 7 for the Rangers since the 2011 World Series. Game 7 featured a pitching rematch of Game 3 between Cristian Javier for the Astros and Max Scherzer for the Rangers. Corey Seager hit a solo home run in the first off Javier to put Texas up 1–0. After Evan Carter walked, Adolis García singled to put Texas up 2–0. Mitch Garver then singled in Garcia, giving Texas a three-run lead. After giving up another single to Jonah Heim, Javier was pulled and replaced with Phil Maton. In the home half, José Abreu singled to score Jose Altuve to narrow the lead to 3–1. In the third, Adolis García hit a solo home run near the right-field foul pole off Hunter Brown to extend the Rangers lead to 4–1. Alex Bregman hit a solo home run off Scherzer to narrow the lead to 4–2 in the bottom of the inning. The Rangers fourth inning had Evan Carter with a two-run double and García with a two-run single that gave the Rangers an 8–2 cushion. In the sixth, the Rangers added more runs when Nathaniel Lowe hit a two-run home run giving the Rangers a 10–2 lead. After Yordan Alvarez singled home Alex Bregman in the seventh to make it 10–3, García got that run back with a solo home run in the eighth, his second of the game, to give the Rangers an 11–3 lead. Finally, in the bottom of the ninth inning, Altuve hit a solo home run off José Leclerc to make it 11–4, but that was the only noise that the Astros could make. With the 11–4 victory, the Rangers won the American League pennant, advancing to their third overall World Series and first since 2011.

This was the second best-of-seven playoff series in Major League Baseball history (after the 2019 World Series) in which the visiting team won every game. The Astros were on the losing end in both series and notably, the Game 7 starting pitcher for the visiting teams on both occasions was Max Scherzer.

After the game, Adolis García was named series MVP, with fifteen RBIs and seven runs, including five home runs, all of which came in the final four games of the series. His fifteen RBIs set the Major League record for most RBIs in a single series, surpassing fellow Ranger Nelson Cruz, who knocked in 13 runners in the 2011 ALCS.

=== Composite line score ===
2023 ALCS (4–3): Texas Rangers beat Houston Astros

Team	1	2	3	4	5	6	7	8	9	R	H	E
Texas Rangers	7	4	3	6	4	5	2	3	5	39	61	2
Houston Astros	6	4	2	6	0	3	5	3	4	33	60	3
Total attendance: 296,880 Average attendance: 42,411

== Aftermath ==
After the Astros lost the series, Houston mayor Sylvester Turner honored the wager and indeed wore a Rangers jersey to a city council meeting.

A few days after the conclusion of the ALCS, Dusty Baker announced his retirement after 26 years as an MLB manager. The previous season, at age 73, Baker became the oldest manager to win a championship in one of the four major North American sports. He was also the first MLB manager to reach the playoffs and win a division title with five different teams, having accomplished both feats with each team he managed. At the time of his retirement, Baker ranked seventh in MLB managerial wins and had the most wins among African-American managers.

The Astros run of seven straight LCS appearances would end in 2024, falling just short of the record eight straight set by the 1991–1993, 1995–1999 Braves (MLB did not have a postseason in 1994 due to the 1994–95 Major League Baseball strike). The streak of consecutive World Series played in Texas also ended in 2024. From 2019 to 2023, a Fall Classic either took place in Houston (2017, 2019, 2021, and 2022) or Arlington (2020, due to the COVID-19 pandemic, and 2023).

This is currently the only ALCS to not feature an American League East team from 2012–present.

== See also ==
- 2023 National League Championship Series
- Lone Star Series
