= Adolis García =

Cuban baseball player (born 1993)

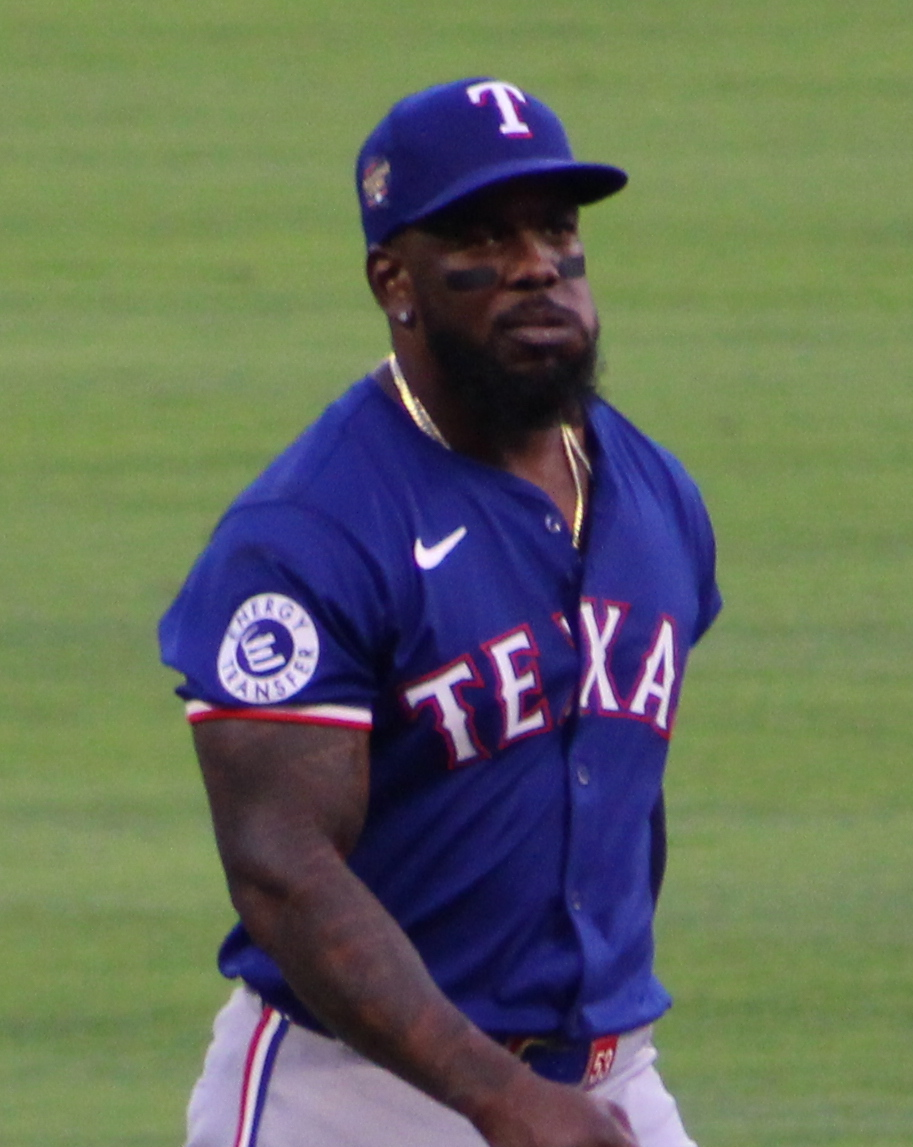
- García with the Texas Rangers in 2024

Free agent
- Outfielder
- Born: March 2, 1993 (age 33); Ciego de Ávila, Cuba
- Bats: Right Throws: Right

Professional debut
- NPB: June 16, 2016, for the Yomiuri Giants
- MLB: August 8, 2018, for the St. Louis Cardinals

NPB statistics (through 2016 season)
- Batting average: .000
- Home runs: 0
- Runs batted in: 0

MLB statistics (through 2026 season)
- Batting average: .234
- Home runs: 148
- Runs batted in: 480
- Stats at Baseball Reference

Teams
- Yomiuri Giants (2016); St. Louis Cardinals (2018); Texas Rangers (2020–2025); Philadelphia Phillies (2026)

Career highlights and awards
- 2× All-Star (2021, 2023); World Series champion (2023); ALCS MVP (2023); Gold Glove Award (2023)
Medals
Men's baseball
Representing Cuba
Pan American Games
Bronze medal – third place	2015 Toronto	Team

José Adolis García Arrieta, nicknamed "El Bombi", (born March 2, 1993) is a Cuban-born professional baseball outfielder who is a free agent. He has played in Major League Baseball (MLB) for the St. Louis Cardinals, Texas Rangers, and Philadelphia Phillies, and in Nippon Professional Baseball (NPB) for the Yomiuri Giants, and in the Cuban National Series for Tigres de Ciego de Ávila. García was an MLB All-Star in 2021 and 2023. García won the 2023 World Series with the Rangers, winning ALCS MVP and setting the single post-season record by recording 22 RBI throughout their championship run.

== Career ==
=== Cuban career ===
García played for Tigres de Ciego de Ávila of the Cuban National Series from 2011 into 2016. He was voted Most Valuable Player for the 2015–16 Cuban National Series, in a season where he slashed .294/.371/.520 in the first half, and .315/.395/.517 in the second half.

=== Yomiuri Giants ===
On April 20, 2016, García signed with the Yomiuri Giants of Nippon Professional Baseball, and that season he batted .220/.258/.373 for them. García played for the Cuban national team at the 2015 Pan American Games.

=== St. Louis Cardinals ===
García defected from Cuba in 2016. He signed with the St. Louis Cardinals in February 2017, receiving a non-roster invitation to spring training. He spent 2017 with both the Springfield Cardinals of the Double-A Texas League and the Memphis Redbirds of the Triple-A Pacific Coast League, posting a combined .290 batting average with 15 home runs and 65 runs batted in (RBI) between both affiliates.

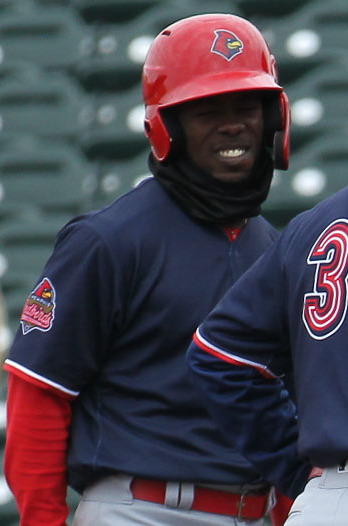
García with the Memphis Redbirds

García began the 2018 season with Memphis. The Cardinals promoted him to the major leagues on August 6. In 112 games for Memphis, he batted .256 with 22 home runs, 71 RBIs, 159 strikeouts, and 10 stolen bases. In 21 games for St. Louis, he recorded two hits, one of them being a double, and one RBI in 17 at bats.

García was designated for assignment on December 18, 2019.

=== Texas Rangers ===
On December 21, 2019, García was traded to the Texas Rangers in exchange for cash considerations. In 2020 for the Rangers, García recorded only six at-bats, and went hitless on the year.

==== 2021 ====
On February 10, 2021, García was designated for assignment after the signing of Mike Foltynewicz was made official. On February 12, García was outrighted and invited to spring training as a non-roster invitee.

On April 13, 2021, García was selected to the active roster after Ronald Guzmán was placed on the injured list. García was named the American League Rookie of the Month for May 2021 after hitting .312 with a .633 slugging percentage and 11 home runs. García was named as a reserve for the American League in the 2021 MLB All-Star Game, and went one-for-two with a double in the game. In 2021, García batted .243/.286/.454/.740 and led all rookies with 90 RBIs and 59 extra-base hits. He also hit 31 home runs, stuck out 194 times, and tied for the league lead with 16 outfield assists.

==== 2022 ====
Over 156 games for Texas in 2022, García hit .250/.300/.456/.756 with 27 home runs, 101 RBIs, 183 strikeouts, and 25 stolen bases.

==== 2023 ====
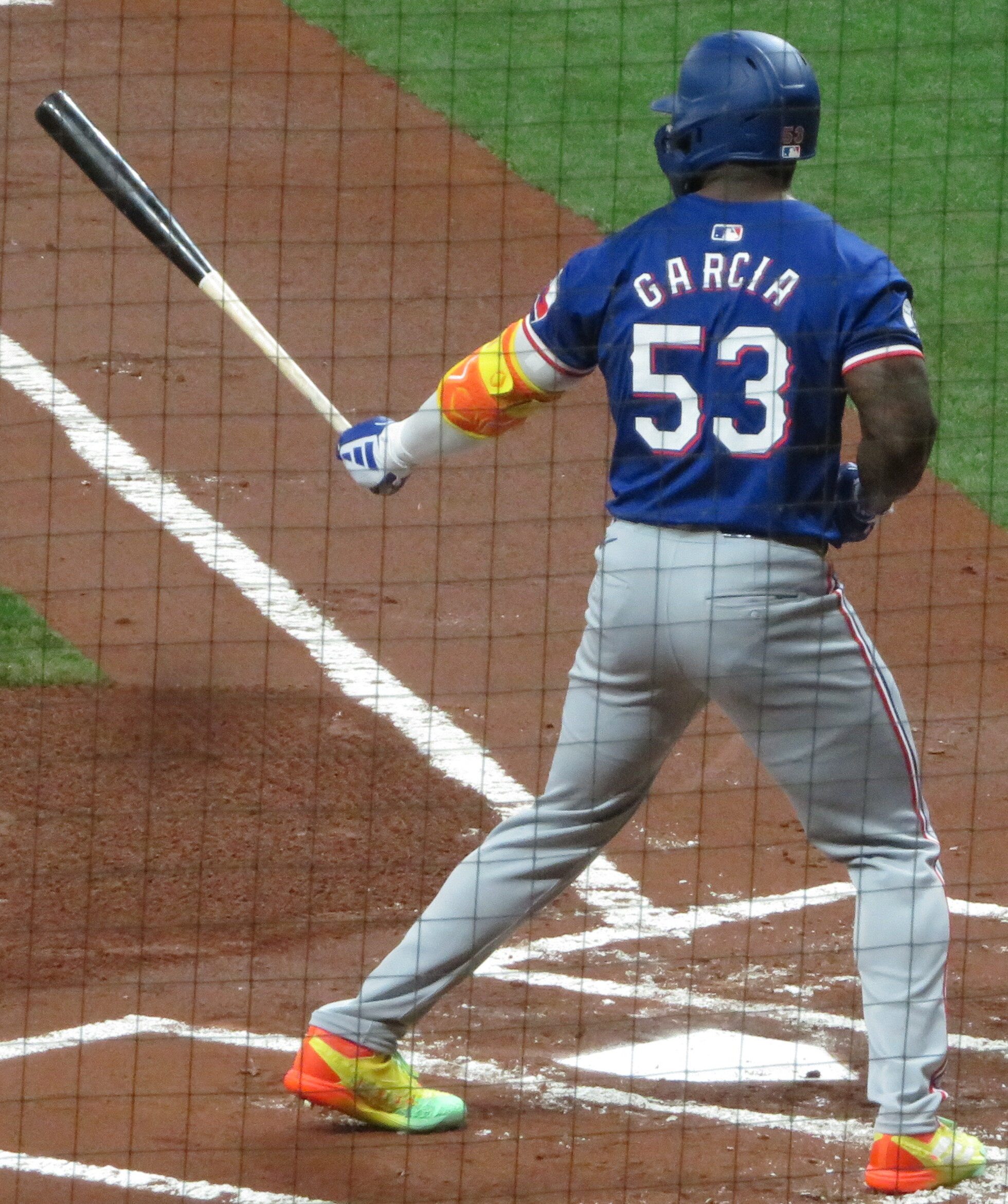
Garcia with the Texas Rangers

On April 22, 2023, against the Oakland Athletics, García had five hits, including two doubles and three home runs, and drove in eight runs. With this, he became the fourth person in MLB history to hit three home runs and two doubles in one game. García was named as a reserve for the American League in the 2023 MLB All-Star Game, the second selection of his career. On September 8, García suffered a right knee patella tendon strain but missed only 10 games. In 148 total games in 2023, García hit .245/.328/.508/.836 with 39 home runs, 107 RBI, 175 strikeouts, and 9 stolen bases.

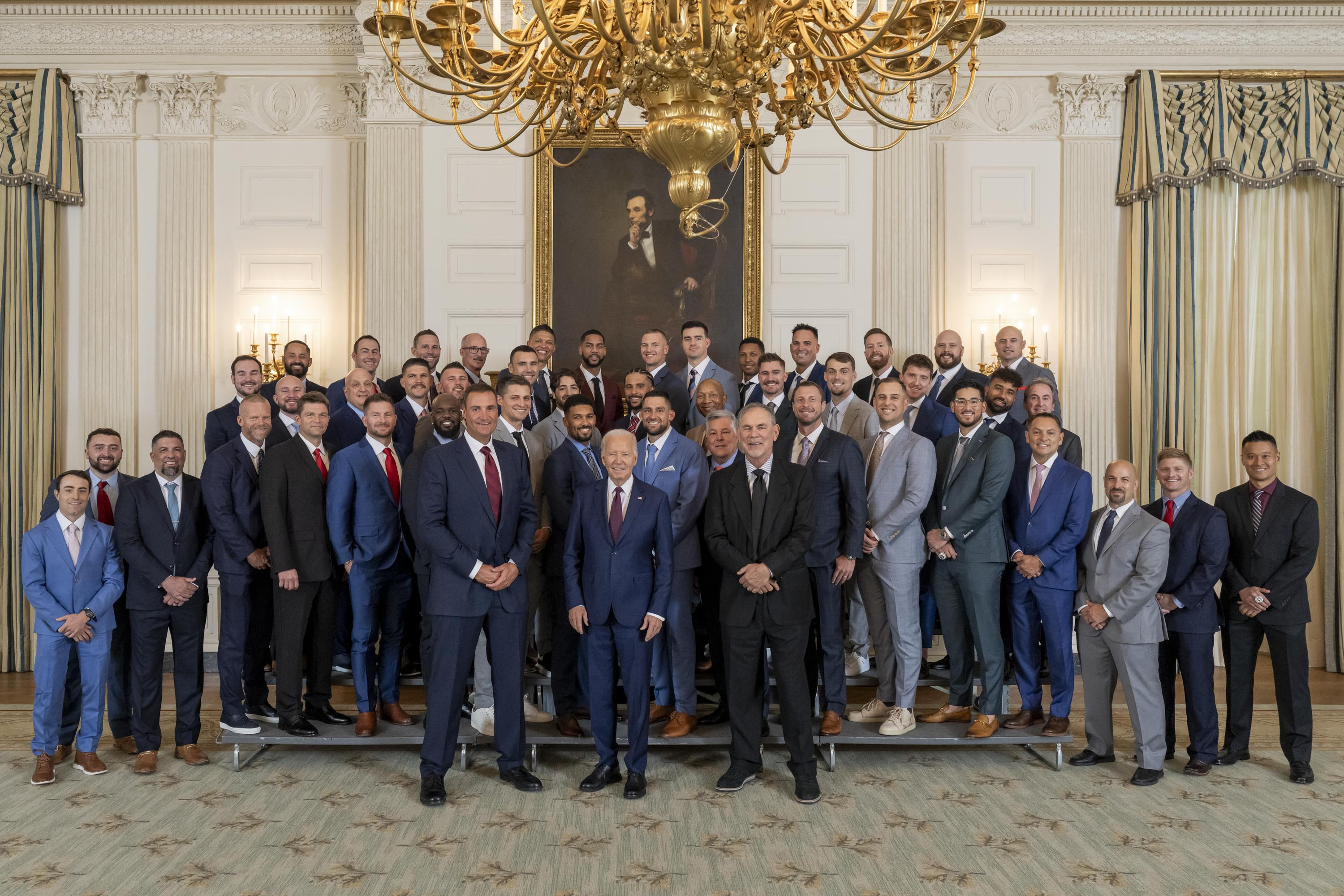
Garcia at the White House in 2024

In 2023, despite losing the division to the Astros on the final day of the regular season, the Rangers upset the Rays and Orioles to make it to the ALCS to play Houston. Over the final four games of the series, García homered five times. In Game 5 García hit a lead-changing three-run home run to put Texas up 4–2. In the bottom of the eighth, Garcia was at the center of a benches-clearing incident after he was hit by a Bryan Abreu fastball, resulting in his ejection from the game and a fine. Houston ended up winning 5–4. In Game 6 in Houston, with Texas in a must-win situation, he hit a grand slam in the top of the ninth despite striking out four times that day. In Game 7, an 11–4 blowout in favor of Texas, García homered twice and drove in five runs. Over the series, García set a record with 15 RBIs in a postseason series and was named the ALCS Most Valuable Player. In Game 1 of the 2023 World Series versus the Arizona Diamondbacks, García hit a walk-off home run versus Miguel Castro in the bottom of the eleventh inning. García set a single post-season record by recording 22 RBI throughout the Rangers run. García suffered a strained right oblique at the end of Game 3 and missed the final two games of the series. García and Texas won the 2023 World Series in 5 games. García won an American League outfield Gold Glove Award in 2023, the first of his career.

==== 2024–25 ====
On February 8, 2024, García signed a two-year, $14 million contract with the Rangers to avoid arbitration. He made 154 appearances for the Rangers during the regular season, batting .224/.284/.400 with 25 home runs, 85 RBI, and 11 stolen bases.

García made 135 appearances for Texas during the 2025 campaign, slashing .227/.271/.394 with 19 home runs, 75 RBI, and 13 stolen bases. On November 21, 2025, García was non-tendered by the Rangers and became a free agent.

=== Philadelphia Phillies ===
On December 16, 2025, García signed a one-year, $10 million contract with the Philadelphia Phillies. In 67 appearances for Philadelphia, he batted .195/.270/.329 with seven home runs, 21 RBI, and three stolen bases. On June 12, 2026, García was placed on the 60-day injured list due to a torn right lat muscle. On June 18, it was announced that García would require season-ending surgery to address the injury.

== Personal life ==
His older brother, Adonis García, is a former professional baseball player.

García is the godfather of Randy Arozarena's daughter. Arozarena, who defected from Cuba a year before García and also signed his first minor league contract with the Cardinals, described García in July 2023 as "kind of like my brother."

== See also ==
- List of baseball players who defected from Cuba
