= Mitch Garver =

American baseball player (born 1991)

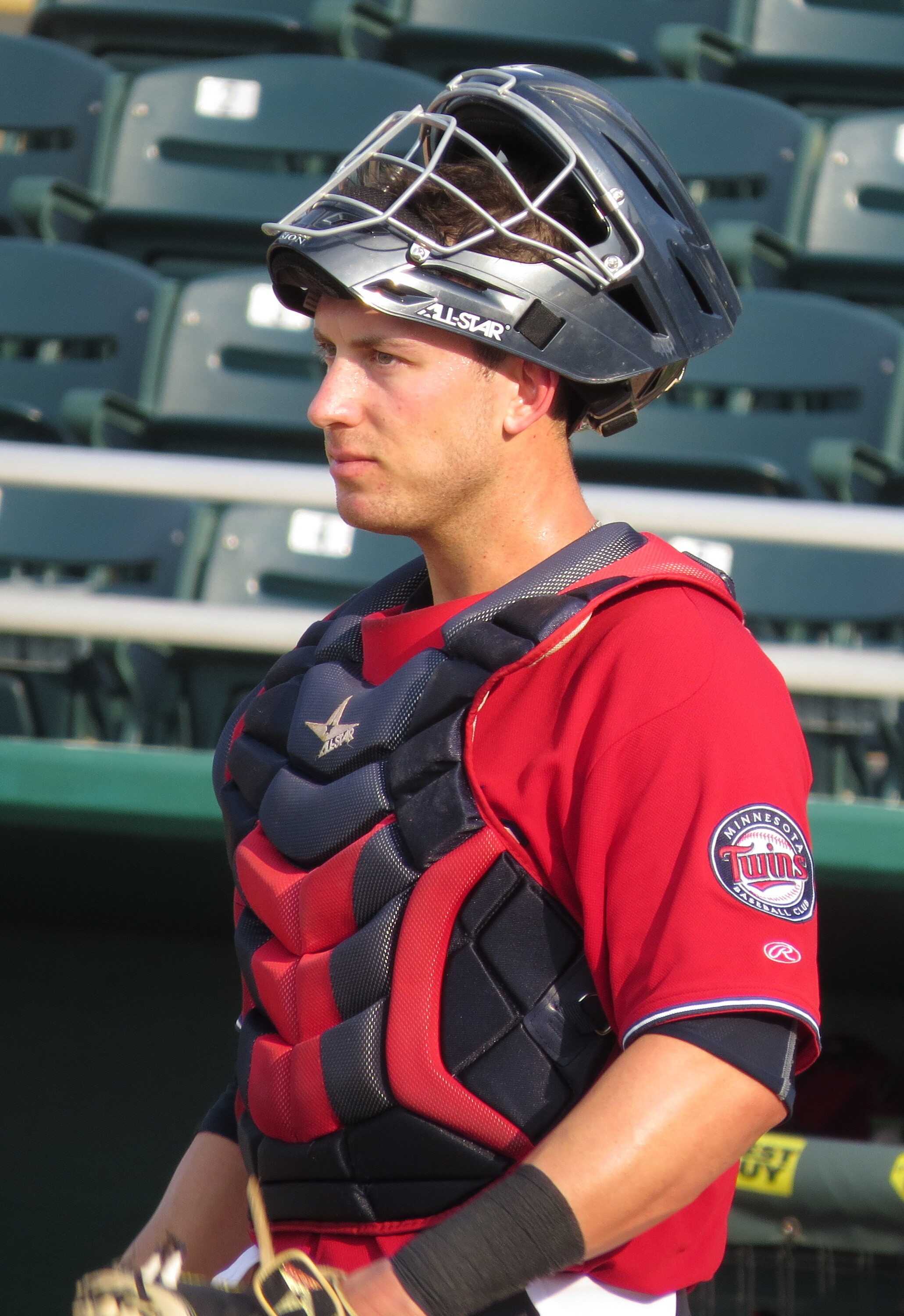
- Garver with the Minnesota Twins in 2015
- Catcher / Designated hitter
- Born: January 15, 1991 (age 35); Albuquerque, New Mexico, U.S.
- Batted: Right Threw: Right

MLB debut
- August 19, 2017, for the Minnesota Twins

Last MLB appearance
- August 1, 2026, for the Seattle Mariners

MLB statistics
- Batting average: .229
- Home runs: 110
- Runs batted in: 324
- Stats at Baseball Reference

Teams
- Minnesota Twins (2017–2021); Texas Rangers (2022–2023); Seattle Mariners (2024–2026)

Career highlights and awards
- World Series champion (2023); Silver Slugger Award (2019)

Mitchell Lynn Garver (born January 15, 1991) is an American former professional baseball catcher and designated hitter. He played in Major League Baseball (MLB) for the Minnesota Twins, Texas Rangers, and Seattle Mariners. Garver made his MLB debut with the Twins in 2017 and won a Silver Slugger Award in 2019. The Twins traded him to the Rangers in 2022, and he won the 2023 World Series with Texas. That December, he signed with the Mariners.

== Early life ==
Garver was born on January 15, 1991, in Albuquerque, New Mexico. He attended La Cueva High School in Albuquerque, catching for the school baseball team. Garver was a skilled center back for the school soccer team, and his coach suggested that Garver move to England to further pursue a soccer career. Garver, who preferred baseball, was "terrified" at the prospect and turned down the offer. As a junior in 2008, he helped the soccer and baseball team both win state championships. In 2009, Garver was named the Albuquerque Public Schools Male Athlete of the Year and an all-state and honorable mention All-American in baseball. He batted .521 as a senior with 10 home runs.

== College career ==
Garver attended the University of New Mexico. He was a walk on for the Lobos college baseball team. In 2010 and 2011, he played summer league baseball for the St. Cloud River Bats of the Northwoods League. As a junior in 2012, he was named co-Mountain West Conference player of the year, with teammate D. J. Peterson, and a second-team All-American by Louisville Slugger. He and Peterson played summer baseball for the Hyannis Harbor Hawks of the Cape Cod Baseball League in 2012, where Garver was named a league all-star. In 2013, Garver and Peterson repeated as co-conference players of the year. Garver also set a Lobos record by starting 181 consecutive games.

== Professional career ==
=== Minnesota Twins ===
==== Draft and minor leagues ====
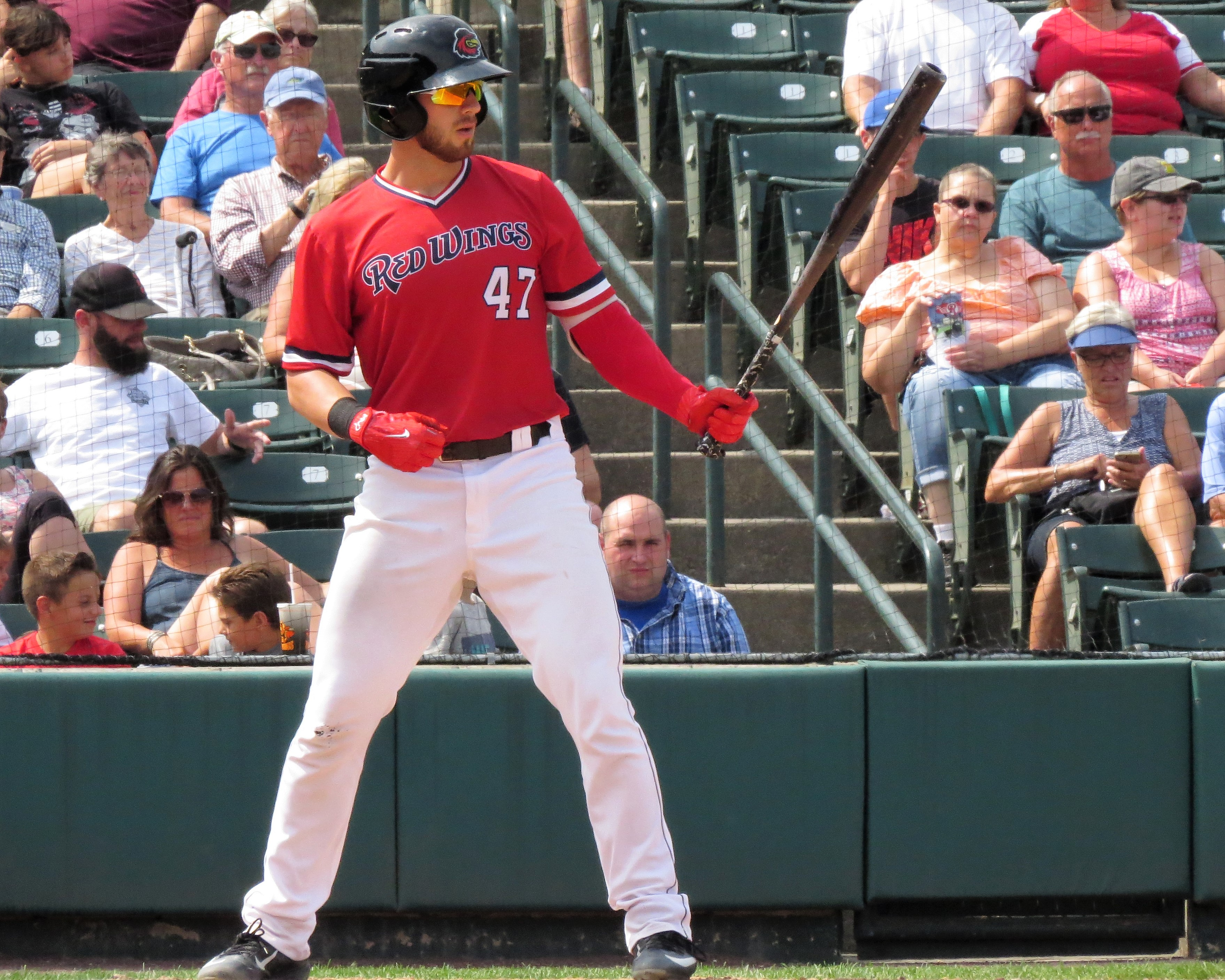
Garver with the Rochester Red Wings in 2017

The Minnesota Twins selected Garver in the ninth round of the 2013 Major League Baseball draft. He signed with the team, receiving a $40,000 signing bonus, and he steadily advanced through the minor leagues for the next three and a half season. He played for the Elizabethton Twins for the rest of 2013, batting .243 in 56 games. He spent 2014 with the Cedar Rapids Kernels, where he posted a .245 average with 16 home runs and 79 RBI. In 2015 with the Fort Myers Miracle, he batted .245 with only four home runs but a team-high 69 walks. After the regular season, he played for the Scottsdale Scorpions in the Arizona Fall League. Garver started 2016 with the Chattanooga Lookouts and was promoted in August to the Triple-A Rochester Red Wings. He hit a combined .270 with 11 home runs and 66 RBI. He returned to the Arizona Fall League for the second consecutive year, this time playing for the Surprise Saguaros. The Twins added him to their 40-man roster on November 18 to prevent him from being eligible for the Rule 5 draft. Garver returned to Rochester to start 2017, where he displayed the best power of his pro career thus far, batting .291/.387/.541 with 17 home runs in 88 games.

==== Major leagues (2017–2021) ====
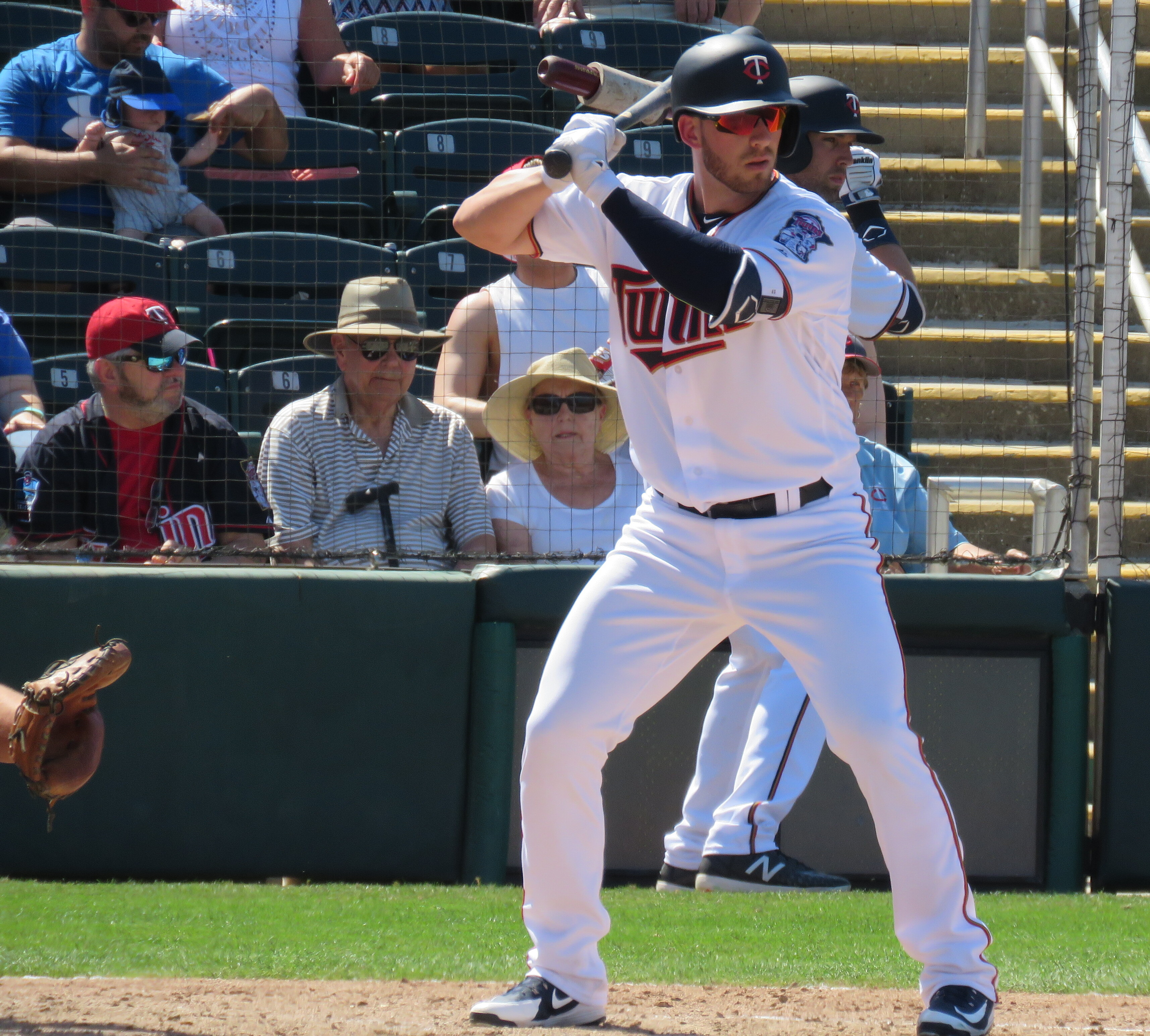
Garver batting for the Twins in spring training 2018

The Twins promoted Garver to the major leagues on August 18, 2017, and he made his MLB debut the next day, striking out as a pinch hitter. On August 20, Garver got his first MLB hit, an infield single off Braden Shipley of the Arizona Diamondbacks, who Garver had previously faced in college. He played in 23 games in the majors in 2017, batting .196 with 3 RBIs. In 2018, Garver hit his first home run on April 5 and became the Twins’ primary catcher by mid-May. In his rookie season in 2018, he batted .268/.335/.414 with seven home runs in 103 games, including 82 starts at catcher.

Garver enjoyed a breakout season in 2019 but was limited by injuries. On May 14, he suffered a left high ankle sprain after a home plate collision with Shohei Ohtani of the Los Angeles Angels. Garver tagged out Ohtani, protecting the Twins' 4–3 lead that he'd created with an earlier home run. Garver left the game and was put on the 10-day injured list, replaced on the roster by Miguel Sano. Garver left the injured list on June 2. In 311 at bats in 2019, Garver hit 31 home runs while driving in 67. Garver won the Silver Slugger Award for catchers in the American League (AL). He went 2-for-12 in the AL Division Series (ALDS), which the Twins lost in the minimum three games.

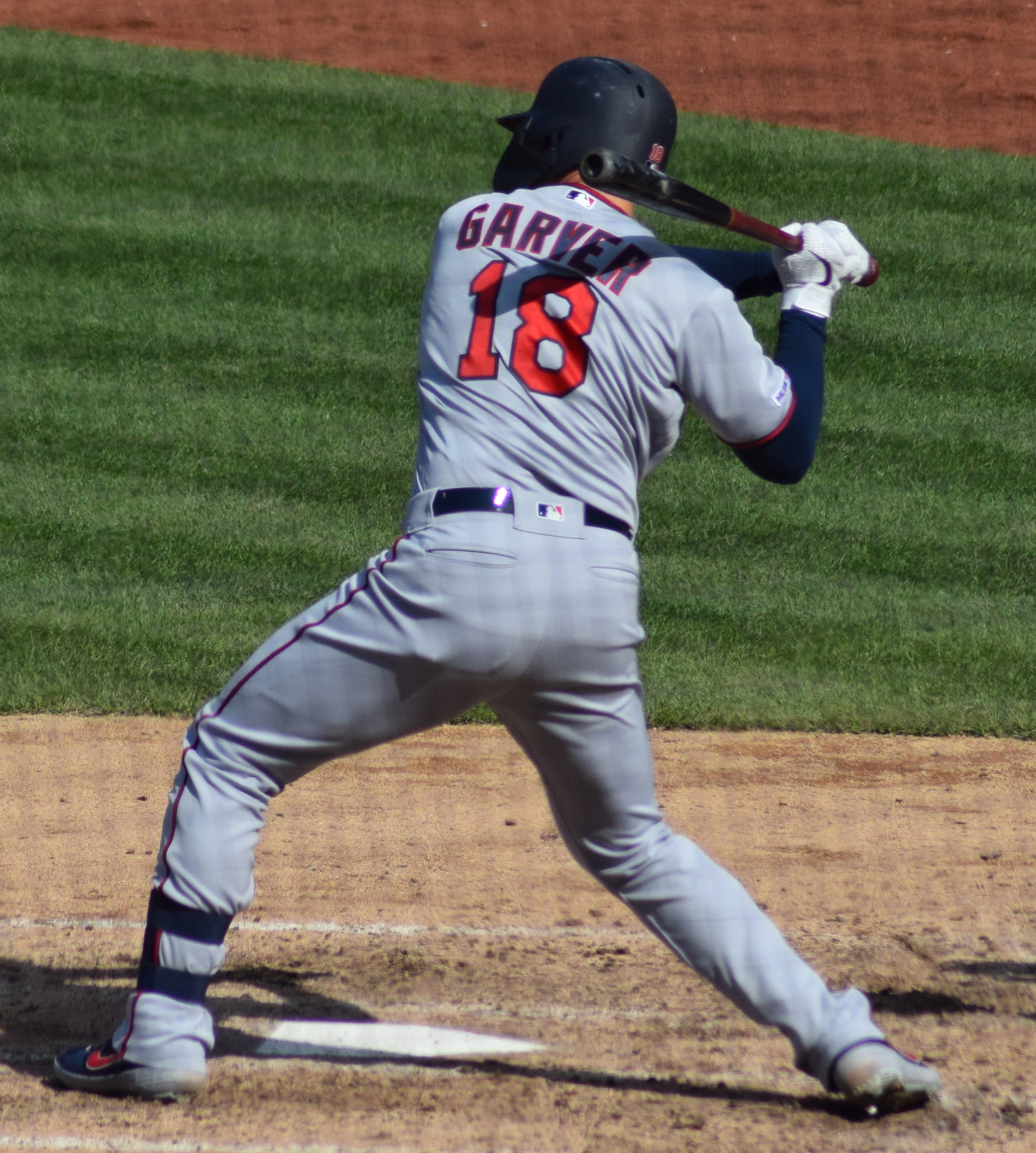
Garver batting in 2019

Garver was limited to 23 games in the shortened 2020 season due to a right intercostal strain that kept him out of play for a month. He batted .167/.247/.264 in his brief action. In 2021, Garver rebounded to hit .256 with 13 home runs in 68 games. He was off the Twins roster several times, due to a groin contusion, lower back tightness, and the birth of his first child. On July 27, both Garver and Detroit Tigers catcher Eric Haase hit grand slams. It was both catchers' first MLB grand slams and the first time in MLB history that opposing catchers hit grand slams in the same game.

=== Texas Rangers ===
On March 12, 2022, the Twins traded Garver to the Texas Rangers for Isiah Kiner-Falefa and Ronny Henriquez. While still catching some games, Garver was primarily a designated hitter for the Rangers, playing twice as many games without playing the field. Garver had surgery to repair a torn flexor tendon in his right forearm in July 2022, ending his season. In 54 games for Texas in 2022, he hit .207/.298/.404 with 10 home runs and 24 RBI.

Garver and his team bounced back in 2023. Though a left knee sprain sidelined him from April 10 to June 2, he hit .270/.370/.500 with 19 home runs in the regular season. His slugging continued early in the playoffs, as he hit a grand slam in the Rangers 11–8 win over the Baltimore Orioles in Game 2 of the ALDS. He added two more hits in Game 3, helping the Rangers clinch a series sweep. He started every game of the AL Championship Series (ALCS), with his best performance in Game 6, with a home run, double, and single as the Rangers avoided playoff elimination. The Rangers won the World Series. Garver homered for the Rangers' only run in a Game 2 loss to the Arizona Diamondbacks but otherwise managed one single and one walk in 22 plate appearances in the Fall Classic. Garver elected free agency on November 2.

=== Seattle Mariners ===
On December 28, 2023, Garver signed a two-year, $24 million contract with the Seattle Mariners that included a mutual $12 million option for 2026. Garver was tabbed as the team's primary DH before the 2024 season, though he caught 24 games backing up Cal Raleigh. He hit a walk-off home run on April 29. He played in a career-high 114 games but had one of his worst offensive seasons. He hit .172/.286/.341, all of which were worse than only his shortened 2020 season, and he struck out a career-high 133 times. Garver said he received insults and death threats from fans reacting to his performance.

In 2025, Garver again was a backup catcher and part-time DH and had a similar offensive performance. He batted .209/.297/.343 with nine home runs, 30 RBI and a career-high three stolen bases in 87 games. He hit a pinch-hit triple in Game 2 of the ALCS, only his second triple since May 2019. He batted 2-for-7 in the postseason. On November 3, the Mariners declined Garver's mutual option, and he became a free agent.

On February 18, 2026, Garver re-signed with the Mariners on a minor league contract. On March 25, the Mariners selected his contract and named him to the their Opening Day roster. In 50 appearances for Seattle, he batted .175/.302/.294 with four home runs and 15 RBI. He was released by the Mariners on August 4, following the team's trade deadline moves.

=== Retirement ===
On August 7, 2026, Garver signed a minor league contract with the New York Yankees. In nine games with the Triple-A Scranton/Wilkes-Barre Railriders he batted .179/.324/.214 with no home runs and one RBI.

On October 22, Garver announced his retirement from professional baseball.

== Player profile ==
Garver was a modern early adopter of catching with one knee on the ground, rather than crouching with both knees up, switching his stance in 2019. Other catchers, including Tony Peña and Brad Gulden, had used a similar stance. Earlier in his career, Garver struggled with pitch framing, particularly in catching low strikes, and he worked with coaches Bill Evers and Tanner Swanson after the 2018 season to find a stance that would improve his framing of lower pitches. The one-knee down catching stance became more common, due in part to Garver and Swanson, with 90 percent of catchers using the stance in 2024. While Garver's defense improved considerably from 2018, he subsequently ranked as an average catcher, according to Statcast and other advanced metrics.

As a batter, Gather had good plate discipline. During his career, he ranked 20th among qualified batters in lowest chase rate (not swinging at pitches outside the strike zone) and maintained an above-average walk rate. During his best seasons, this discipline was paired with power hitting, having recorded three seasons with an isolated slugging percentage above .230.

Garver's career and playing time were limited by injuries, including a concussion, a groin contusion, and the forearm injury that ended his 2021 season. This led to him shifting from primarily a catcher to primarily a DH. He played more games at DH than catcher from 2022 through 2024.

== Personal life ==
Garver met his wife during their sophomore year of high school. She is a veterinarian, earning her veterinary degree from Oregon State University in 2018. Their first child was born on July 22, 2021. Their second child was born on December 27, 2023, prior to Garver signing with the Mariners. They have two dogs, Chupi and Rip. The Garvers created an endowed scholarship at Oregon State in 2021 honoring their late dog, a boxer named Benny, who died of lymphoma.

While with the Twins in 2020, OMNI Brewing released a "Garv Sauce" beer, based on Garver's nickname.
