= Ryan Pressly =

American baseball player (born 1988)

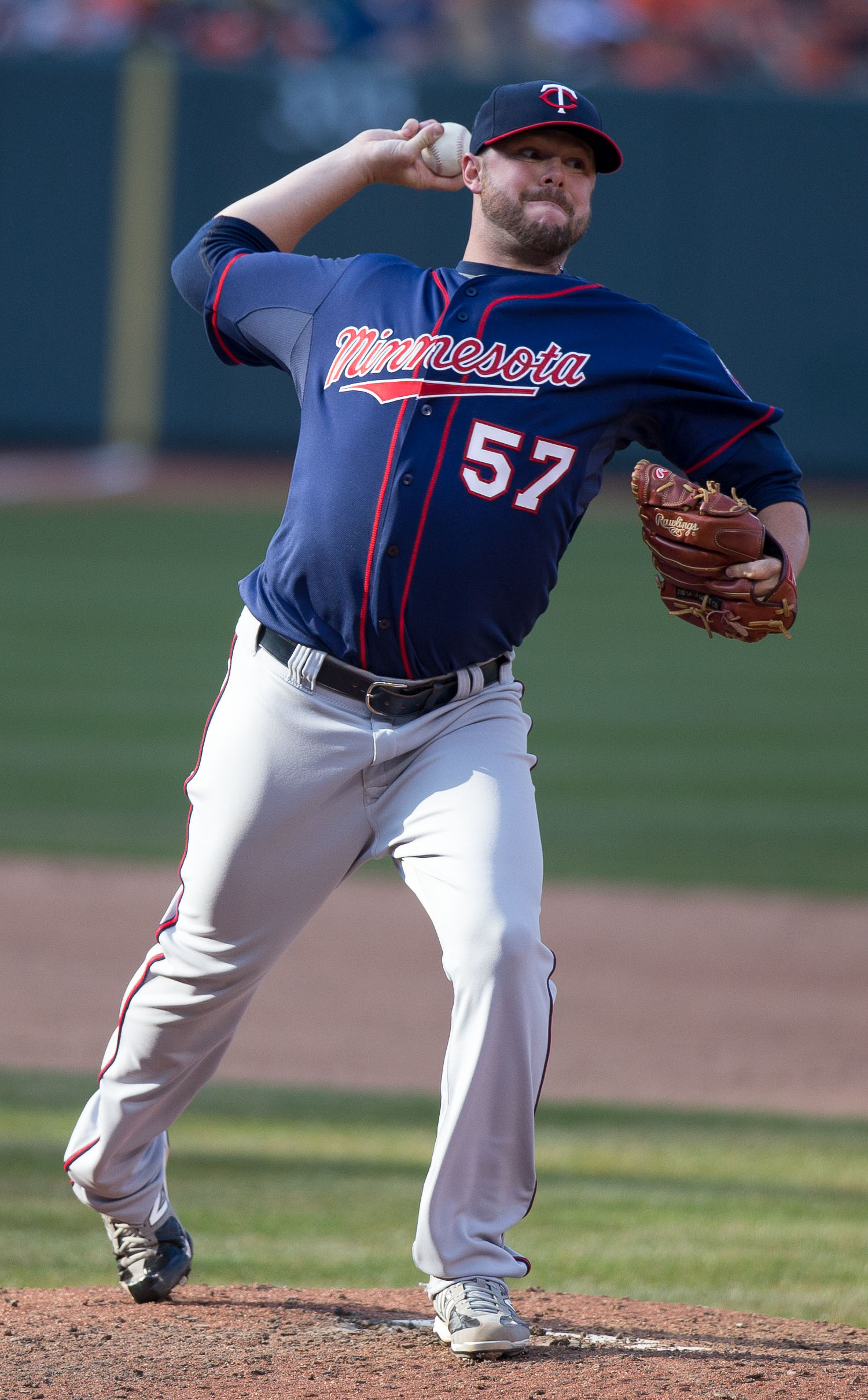
- Pressly with the Minnesota Twins in 2013
- Pitcher
- Born: December 15, 1988 (age 37); Dallas, Texas, U.S.
- Batted: Right Threw: Right

MLB debut
- April 4, 2013, for the Minnesota Twins

Last MLB appearance
- July 29, 2025, for the Chicago Cubs

MLB statistics
- Win–loss record: 37–39
- Earned run average: 3.33
- Strikeouts: 721
- Saves: 117
- Stats at Baseball Reference

Teams
- Minnesota Twins (2013–2018); Houston Astros (2018–2024); Chicago Cubs (2025)

Career highlights and awards
- 2× All-Star (2019, 2021); World Series champion (2022); Pitched a combined no-hitter on June 25, 2022; Pitched a combined no-hitter in Game 4 of the 2022 World Series
Medals
Men's baseball
Representing United States
World Baseball Classic
Silver medal – second place	2023 Miami	Team

Thomas Ryan Pressly (born December 15, 1988) is an American former professional baseball pitcher. He played in Major League Baseball (MLB) for the Minnesota Twins, Houston Astros, and Chicago Cubs from 2013 to 2025. He also played for Team USA in the World Baseball Classic (WBC).

A two-time American League (AL) All-Star, Pressly was selected to the 2022 All-MLB Team in conjunction with winning his first World Series championship as a member of the Astros. That season, he became the first pitcher to finish two no-hit games, including just the second no-hitter in World Series history. In 2019, he set the MLB record for consecutive scoreless appearances with 40.

From Dallas, Texas, Pressly was selected by the Boston Red Sox from high school in the 11th round of the 2007 MLB draft. After five seasons in the minor leagues, he was chosen by the Minnesota Twins in the 2012 Rule 5 draft, and made his MLB debut in 2013. The Twins traded Pressly to Houston in 2018. In Game 4 of the 2022 World Series, he became the first MLB relief pitcher to contribute to two combined no-hitters and just the second pitcher overall (Note: Teammate Cristian Javier, the starting pitcher for both no-hitters, was the first.) In each season as a member of the Astros, Pressly contributed in the postseason, including in six consecutive American League Championship Series (ALCS) and three World Series. His fourteen postseason saves (Note: All with Houston, a club record.) rank fifth in MLB history.

== Early life and amateur career ==
Ryan Pressly was born in Dallas and raised in Irving, Texas. His grandfather, Tito Nicholas, was a personal friend of Tom Landry, the former coach of the Dallas Cowboys. Pressly trained in baseball from a young age, and was coached by retired Major League Baseball (MLB) pitcher Steve Busby. Pressly grew up a fan of the Texas Rangers.

Pressly attended American Heritage Academy in Carrollton, Texas, for his first three years of high school. He starred as a pitcher and shortstop for the school's baseball team, leading the conference in 23 different offensive categories. In addition to baseball, Pressly played American football as a defensive back. During a football game, he tore the anterior cruciate ligament and medial collateral ligament in his left knee when he was tackled following an interception. His knee required surgery, ending his football career and jeopardizing his baseball career.

As American Heritage considered ending its baseball program, Pressly transferred to Edward S. Marcus High School in Flower Mound, Texas, for his senior year. Pressly committed to attend Texas Tech University after receiving a scholarship to play college baseball for the Red Raiders team.

== Professional career ==
=== Boston Red Sox (2007–2012) ===
The Boston Red Sox selected Pressly in the 11th round, 354th overall, of the 2007 MLB draft. He signed with Boston for a $100,000 bonus rather than attend college. Initially working as a starting pitcher in the Red Sox' in minor league system, he converted to a relief pitcher in 2012. In his first season as a relief pitcher for the Portland Sea Dogs of the Class AA Eastern League, he compiled a 2.93 earned run average (ERA) with 21 strikeouts in 27 2/3 innings pitched (IP).

=== Minnesota Twins (2013–2018) ===
After the 2012 season, the Minnesota Twins selected Pressly from the Red Sox in the Rule 5 draft. Pressly made the Twins' Opening Day roster. He made his major league debut on April 4, pitching a scoreless inning, in which he struck out Torii Hunter. Pressly appeared in 49 games, going 3–3 with 3.87 ERA and 49 strikeouts in 76 2/3 innings of work.

In 2014, Pressly began the season with the Rochester Red Wings, the Twins Triple-A affiliate, before being called up on July 23. He made 25 relief appearances, going 2–0 with a 2.86 ERA. To start the 2015 season, Pressly once again began with Rochester, before being recalled on April 28. On July 4, Pressly suffered a lat muscle strain, putting him on the 15-day disabled list, and after suffering a setback during rehab on August 17, Pressly was ruled out for the remainder of the year. On the season, Pressly made 27 appearances, going 3–2 with a 2.93 ERA.

In 2016, Pressly was primarily used as a middle reliever and setup man. On July 31, Pressly recorded his first major league save in a 6–4 win against the Chicago White Sox. For the year, Pressly appeared in 72 games (4th-most in the AL), compiling a 6–7 record with a 3.70 ERA with 67 strikeouts in 75 1/3 innings. In 2017, Pressly remained a middle reliever and setup man. However, through the first 3 months of the season, he struggled, going 1–2 with a 9.50 ERA in just 18 innings. Due to his struggles, Pressly was optioned to the minors on June 6, and was recalled on June 29. After his recall from the minors, Pressly returned to his prior form, compiling a 1–1 with a 2.75 ERA with 35 strikeouts in 39 1/3 innings. For the season, he was 2–3 with a 4.70 ERA in 57 relief appearances.

During the 2018 season, the Twins continued to maintain Pressly in the role of middle reliever and setup man. He made 51 appearances, finishing with a 1–1 record with a 3.40 ERA with 69 strikeouts in 47 2/3 innings for the Twins.

=== Houston Astros ===
==== 2018–2019 ====
The Twins traded Pressly to the Houston Astros for minor leaguers Jorge Alcalá and Gilberto Celestino on July 27, 2018. In 26 regular season games pitched with the Astros, Pressly posted a 0.77 ERA and walked only three batters. Houston's focus on analytics was largely credited for his post-trade success. The Astros analytics department had noted that Pressly had elite spin rates on his curveball and slider, and recommended that he throw them more often. His 2018 totals between the Twins and Astros included an American League (AL)-leading 77 appearances, 11 games finished, two saves, 2–1 W–L record, and careers bests 2.54 ERA and 2.47 Fielding Independent Pitching (FIP). He crossed the 100-strikeout threshold (101) for the first time, netting a career-high ratio of 12.8 strikeouts per 9 innings pitched (K/9).

In the 2018 postseason, his first, Pressly made two appearances in the American League Division Series (ALDS) versus the Cleveland Indians and three more in the American League Championship Series (ALCS) versus the Red Sox. He tossed 5 innings, faced 20 batters, and allowed one run on one hit, with three walks, .259 on-base plus slugging (OPS) against, and struck out 7. He collected 3 holds as the Red Sox ended the Astros' season in the ALCS in five games.

Before the 2019 season, Pressly signed a two-year contract extension with the Astros worth $17.5 million. On May 17, Pressly broke Craig Kimbrel's major league record with his 39th consecutive scoreless appearance, dating back to August 10, 2018. The streak reached 40 games before he allowed a run on May 24. For the 2019 season, Pressly was 2–3 with three saves and a 2.32 ERA in 55 relief appearances in which he pitched 54 1/3 innings and struck out 72 batters (11.9 per 9 innings), and tied for the major league lead in holds (31). In the 2019 postseason, Pressly made 10 total appearances, including two in the ALDS (Tampa Bay Rays), four in the ALCS (New York Yankees), and four more in the World Series (Washington Nationals), going 1–0 with 1 hold. He struggled, allowing 7 earned in runs in 5 2/3 innings (11.12 ERA), .429/.484/.464/.948 OPS against, .546 batting average on balls in play (BABIP), and struck out 6 of 32 batters. Conversely, seven of the ten outings were scoreless, he surrendered 0 home runs and just a 2.88 FIP rate.

==== 2020–2021 ====
In 2020 as a full-time closer for the first time, Pressly was 1–3 with 12 saves (3rd in the AL) and a 3.43 ERA, in 21 innings in which he struck out 29 batters (12.4 per 9 innings) over 23 relief appearances.

In 2021, Pressly was selected for the second time in his Astros tenure to the All-Star Game, played at Coors Field. When his selection was announced, he had not allowed an earned run in 12 consecutive appearances, leading to a 1.54 ERA over 35 innings and a 4–1 record. He tied for first in the AL in save percentage (93.3%), and among relief pitchers in the AL, was third in ERA, fourth in WHIP (0.83) and he had tied for fifth in with 14 saves. On September 23, Pressley completed a scoreless ninth in his 60th appearance of the season to seal a 9–5 victory versus the Los Angeles Angels, concluding the final condition for his contract for 2022 to fully vest, guaranteeing him a $10 million salary. Since being acquired by Houston at the 2018 trade deadline, Pressly had produced a 2.19 ERA, 0.924 WHIP, and saved 42 games in 160 1/3 innings. He had converted 25 of 27 save chances on the season.

In 2021, Pressly went 5–3 with 26 saves, 0.969 WHIP, and a 2.25 ERA over 64 appearances and 64 innings, striking out 81 batters. He produced the lowest walk and home run rates of his career.

==== 2022 ====
Pressly and the Astros agreed to terms on a new two-year contract extension on April 5, 2022. With $30 million guaranteed, it covered the 2023 and 2024 seasons, with an option for 2025. Due to a case of knee inflammation, he was placed on the 10-day injured list on April 16. On May 29, Pressly earned a save after inducing a ground ball hit by Luis Torrens for a game-ending, bases-loaded double play to preserve a 2–1 win versus the Seattle Mariners.

On June 5, Pressly was ejected in the ninth inning after throwing inside to Michael A. Taylor of the Kansas City Royals. On June 23, Pressly gave up four runs in the bottom of the ninth inning to the New York Yankees, including the go-ahead run delivered by Aaron Judge's walk-off single. On June 25, Pressly closed out a combined no-hitter versus the Yankees by earning the save in a 3–0 win. Led by starter Cristian Javier's seven innings, Héctor Neris also pitched in the eighth inning. It was the 14th no-hitter in Astros history, and first at Yankee Stadium since 2003, also an Astros' combined no-hitter. (Note: The no-hitter on June 11, 2003, involved Roy Oswalt (starter), Peter Munro, Kirk Saarloos, Brad Lidge, Octavio Dotel, and Billy Wagner.)

On July 3, Pressly earned the win (2–2) by closing out a walk-off 4–2 victory over the Los Angeles Angels in which Astros pitchers struck out 20 batters to establish a franchise record in a nine inning contest. Starter Framber Valdez (first six innings), Neris (7th), and Rafael Montero (8th) all preceded Pressly, who, in the ninth, struck out the side. (Note: In the series with Los Angeles, Astros pitching recorded 48 strikeouts to establish a major league record for strikeouts over a three-game played without extra innings.) On July 17 versus the Oakland Athletics, Pressly again struck out the side in the ninth inning to tie the Astros' franchise record with 27 consecutive batters retired by a reliever, first achieved by Dave Giusti in 1965. Pressly's streak occurred over eight straight outings. Presley then retired the Mariners in order in the ninth on July 24 to pass Giusti. In the July 28 game, Presley retired the first two batters in the ninth to reach 32 before surrendering a single to J. P. Crawford, which tied teammate Justin Verlander (2019) for most batters retired in a row among all pitchers in Astros history.

On August 25, the Astros placed Pressly on the 10-day injury due to neck spasms. On September 9, the Astros activated him from the injured list. That day, he surrendered a solo home run in the ninth inning to Taylor Ward before closing a 4–3 win over the Angels for the save. In the season finale versus Philadelphia Philles on October 5, Pressly secured his 33rd save, extending a career-high. It was his 76th save as an Astro, tying him with Fred Gladding for fourth place. (Note: The only hurlers with more saves as an Astro were Wagner (225), Dave Smith (199) and Lidge (123).)

In 2022, he was 2–2 with 33 saves and a 2.98 ERA in 48 1/3 innings with 65 strikeouts in 50 games.

Closing out Game 4 of the 2022 World Series, Pressly secured the final three outs of a 5–0 combined no-hitter of the Phillies. Like the no-hit contest in New York, Javier was the starting pitcher. Bryan Abreu and Rafael Montero both preceded Pressly. He and Javier became the first to contribute in multiple combined no-hitters in the major leagues, with Pressly being the first reliever to do so. The third no-hitter in MLB postseason history, it was the second in World Series play, following Don Larsen's perfect game in 1956. (Note: The other no-hit contest in postseason play was pitched by Roy Halladay in the 2010 National League Division Series.)

Pressly was critical in the Astros’ victory in the 2022 World Series, closing out five of six games, as he allowed just two hits, one walk, and no earned runs in 5 2/3 innings. This impressive run included a 5-out save in Game 5, and the final three outs in Game 6 as the Astros clinched the title. In Game 5, he entered with a 3–2 lead in the eighth, one out and runners on first and third. He struck out Brandon Marsh on three pitches—all sliders—and induced a sharply-hit Kyle Schwarber groundout that first baseman Trey Mancini smothered. Per Baseball-Reference.com, the Marsh strikeout rendered 9.2% championship win probability added (cWPA), the most on any single out over the prior six World Series. For his World Series performance, Pressly led all players in the 2022 edition with a 33.87% cWPA. In total, Pressly went 6-for-6 in postseason saves (while allowing no earned runs) to become the 16th reliever with six postseason saves in one postseason.

==== 2023 ====
Pressly successfully converted 28 consecutive save opportunities—including the postseason—until May 29, 2023, an eventual 7–5 loss to the Twins. On July 21, Pressly pitched a clean ninth inning to close out a 6–4 win over Oakland for the 100th regular-season save of his career, and 99th as Astro. Pressly converted his 100th save as a member of the Astros on July 25 versus the Texas Rangers to become him the fourth pitcher to do so, joining Baseball Hall of Fame member Billy Wagner (225), Dave Smith (199), and Brad Lidge (123).

In Game 1 of the American League Division Series (ALDS), Pressly closed out a 6–4 Astros win over the Twins to earn his 12th career postseason save, moving him into fifth place all-time on the postseason saves list. (Note: The all-time postseason saves leaders included Mariano Rivera (42), Kenley Jansen (20), Lidge (18), Dennis Eckersley (15), and Pressly (12).)

On October 20, Pressly's multi-inning effort in Game 5 of the American League Championship Series (ALCS) in a win over the Rangers resulted in his 14th career postseason save—and 14th straight converted. At the time, he had converted the second-most consecutive postseason saves, trailing only Mariano Rivera (23). Over 46 appearances, Pressly had also posted a 2.22 ERA, 3–0 W–L, .195 batting average against (BAA), and 32 percent strikeout rate.

==== 2024 ====
As a consequence of signing free agent reliever Josh Hader to be their closer prior to the 2024 season, the Astros reassigned Pressly as primary setup man. On June 16, he entered the eighth inning inheriting a no-hit bid by starter Ronel Blanco; after getting two Detroit Tigers out, he allowed a single to Wenceel Pérez for the first hit of the game. He collected his 45th appearance of the season on August 2 to activate a vesting option for 2025, tossing one scoreless inning in a 3–2 victory over the Tampa Bay Rays.

In 2024, Pressly made 59 regular season appearances, producing a 2–3 record, 3.49 ERA, 4 saves, and 58 strikeouts over 56 2/3 innings. He ranked sixth in the AL in holds with 25. In the AL Wild Card Series (WCS) versus Detroit, he was 0–1 with 3 earned runs surrendered in 2/3 inning, taking the loss in Game 2 as the Astros were swept. A wild pitch in the top of the 8th inning allowed Kerry Carpenter to score and tie the contest 2–2, accounting for Pressly's first blown save in the postseason.

=== Chicago Cubs (2025) ===
On January 28, 2025, the Astros traded Pressly with $5.5 million in cash considerations to the Chicago Cubs in exchange for Juan Bello. In 44 appearances for Chicago, he compiled a 2-3 record and 4.35 ERA with 28 strikeouts and five saves across 41 1/3 innings pitched. On July 31, Pressly was designated for assignment by the Cubs. He was released by the team the following day.

On January 17, 2026, Pressly announced his retirement from professional baseball.

== International career ==
On November 10, 2022, Pressly committed to play for the United States in the 2023 World Baseball Classic (WBC). He tossed three scoreless innings in the 2023 WBC, and registered three saves, tying for the tournament lead. Team USA finished as silver medallists, sustaining a defeat to Japan in the final, 3–2.

== Post-playing career ==
On January 19, 2026, Pressly was hired to serve in a player development role for the Minnesota Twins organization.

On March 15, 2026, Pressly joined Space City Home Network (SCHN) as a pre- and post-game analyst for the Astros.

== Personal life ==
Pressly's wife, Kat (née Rogers), is a former Dallas Cowboys Cheerleader. They married on December 31, 2019, in Houston. Their son, Wyatt, was born in August 2021, and their daughter, Hunter Lee, was born in July 2022.

Pressly is an avid outdoorsman and hunter.

During the 2023–24 offseason, Pressly served as a guest bartender for Watch What Happens Live with Andy Cohen on the Bravo network. He was invited to join the show following a discovery that he and his wife were fans of Bravo's The Real Housewives of Salt Lake City.

== See also ==
- Houston Astros award winners and league leaders
- List of Houston Astros no-hitters
- List of Major League Baseball no-hitters
- List of people from Dallas
- Rule 5 draft results

== Notes ==
Achievements
Preceded by Reid Detmers	No-hitter pitcher June 25, 2022 (with Cristian Javier & Héctor Neris)	Succeeded by Himself, Cristian Javier, Bryan Abreu & Rafael Montero
Preceded by Himself, Cristian Javier & Héctor Neris	No-hitter pitcher November 2, 2022 (with Cristian Javier, Bryan Abreu & Rafael Montero)	Succeeded by Domingo Germán
Preceded by Roy Halladay	Postseason no-hitter pitcher November 2, 2022 (with Cristian Javier, Bryan Abreu & Rafael Montero)	Most recent
