= Cristian Javier =

Dominican baseball player (born 1997)

Houston Astros – No. 53
- Pitcher
- Born: March 26, 1997 (age 29); Santo Domingo, Dominican Republic
- Bats: Right Throws: Right

MLB debut
- July 25, 2020, for the Houston Astros

MLB statistics (through 2026 season)
- Win–loss record: 37–28
- Earned run average: 3.82
- Strikeouts: 657
- Stats at Baseball Reference

Teams
- Houston Astros (2020–present)

Career highlights and awards
- World Series champion (2022); Pitched a combined no-hitter on June 25, 2022; Pitched a combined no-hitter in Game 4 of the 2022 World Series

Cristian Javier (born March 26, 1997) is a Dominican professional baseball pitcher for the Houston Astros of Major League Baseball (MLB). Javier signed with the Astros as an international free agent in 2015 and made his MLB debut in 2020. During the Astros' World Series championship season in 2022, Javier was the starting pitcher of two combined no-hitters, including Game 4 of the World Series, the first player in MLB history to do so. The World Series no-hitter was just the second in baseball history and the only combined no-hitter.

== Career ==
=== Minor leagues ===
At age 16, Javier starting pitching, having a maximum velocity of 86 miles per hour (138 km/h) when he initially auditioned for the Houston Astros. Although his velocity was deemed to be low, the fastball generated notable whiff from batters and he threw with excellent command and control. The team brought him back for subsequent workouts, resulting in an increase in velocity each time. When Javier reached 89 miles per hour (143 km/h), scout Román Ocumarez quipped, "if you touch 90, we’re going to sign you." He did so in the next workout, and Javier signed with the Astros as an international free agent on March 18, 2015. His contract was reported to be worth $10,000.

Javier spent his first professional season with the Dominican Summer League Astros, going 4–0 with a 2.13 ERA over 42 1/3 innings. He played 2016 with the Gulf Coast Astros and Greeneville Astros, pitching to a 4–2 record and 2.29 ERA with 66 strikeouts in 51 innings, and 2017 with the Tri-City ValleyCats, Quad Cities River Bandits and Buies Creek Astros, compiling a 3–0 record and 2.25 ERA in 14 games (nine starts). He pitched in 2018 with Quad Cities and Buies Creek, going 7–6 with a 2.70 ERA with 146 strikeouts over 110 innings. He opened the 2019 season with the Fayetteville Woodpeckers before being promoted to the Corpus Christi Hooks on May 15. He was promoted to the Round Rock Express on August 23. Over 26 games (18 starts) with the three clubs, Javier went 8-3 with a 1.74 ERA, striking out 170 over 113 2/3 innings.

Following the 2019 season, the Astros added Javier to their 40–man roster.

=== Major leagues ===
==== 2020 ====
On July 25, 2020, Javier made his MLB debut, pitching one scoreless inning versus the Seattle Mariners. He made his first career MLB start versus the Los Angeles Dodgers four days later. On August 4, he received his first MLB career win.

In 2020, Javier was 5-2 with a 3.48 ERA in 54 1/3 innings over 12 games (10 starts). Javier made his postseason debut against the Minnesota Twins in the American League Wild Card Series, also receiving his first playoff win in this game. Javier finished third in voting for the AL Rookie of the Year award behind Luis Robert and the winner, Kyle Lewis.

==== 2021 ====
On April 22, 2021, Javier became the first Astros pitcher to record the first eight outs of a game by strikeout since Jim Deshaies in 1986. In a five inning performance, he set a new personal high with nine strikeouts and one walk on no earned runs.

Javier finished the 2021 season 4–1 with a 3.55 ERA, setting numerous then-career highs, including 36 games pitched, nine starts, 101 1/3 innings, 130 strikeouts, 53 walks, and two saves. He also struck out 11.5 batters per nine innings pitched (K/9).

==== 2022 ====
After 8 1/3 scoreless innings in relief spanning three appearances to begin the 2022 season, the Astros made Javier their sixth starter. He won his starting debut on April 27, in which he allowed two runs, four hits, and two walks in five innings versus the Texas Rangers. He started the May 3 contest versus the Mariners without allowing a hit until the fourth inning when Ty France led off with a single; Javier permitted two hits in all over 5 1/3 innings as the Astros shutout the Mariners 4–0. Javier tied his career high with nine strikeouts on May 25, keeping the Cleveland Guardians hitless until Ernie Clement singled with two outs in the fifth inning. Javier totaled 5 2/3 scoreless innings in which he earned the win in a 2–1 final score.

On June 25, 2022, Javier threw the first seven innings to lead his team to a combined no-hitter against the New York Yankees, starting opposite former Astros ace Gerrit Cole. In that game, Javier also collected 13 strikeouts to establish a new career-best. In his next start on July 1, 2022, Javier topped his strike-out record against the Los Angeles Angels with 14 over seven innings, giving up just one run on one hit, with no walks. With 27 strikeouts in total over his last two starts with one hit allowed, he set a Major League Baseball record for most strikeouts with only one hit allowed over a two-game span. (Note: In the series with Los Angeles, Astros pitching recorded 48 strikeouts to establish a major league record for strikeouts over a three-game series played without extra innings.) He became the fourth pitcher in franchise history to attain 13 or more strikeouts in consecutive starts, and the first since Cole in 2019.

Javier faced the Angels on July 13 and lasted 3 2/3 innings while being charged with three runs and striking out 10. It was the first double-digit strikeout effort with less than four innings completed by a starting pitcher since Cleveland's Danny Salazar in 2014. On August 20, Javier hurled six innings of two-hit and one-run ball with eight strikeouts versus the Atlanta Braves for a game score of 71. Over his prior six outings, he had allowed eight runs in 34 innings, including four quality starts. Javier retired the first 13 Baltimore Orioles faced on September 25, allowing one total hit and baserunner over six innings while striking eight for a game score of 78. It was a third consecutive scoreless start for Javier (19 1/3 innings), and a fifth outing over the season in which he allowed one or fewer hits over at least five innings, while collecting at least one strikeout per inning pitched. (Note: Javier joined Freddy Peralta (2021) and Blake Snell (2018) as the only pitchers to post five such outings in one season. No other pitcher had more than three in a major league season.). In his next and final appearance of the regular season on October 1, Javier hurled six scoreless innings versus the Tampa Bay Rays, earned the win, and executed his first career pickoff by throwing out Taylor Walls in the fifth inning. Javier ended his regular season campaign with the longest-active scoreless innings streak in the major leagues (25 1/3).

Javier concluded the 2022 regular season with a 2.54 ERA and 11–9 record over 30 total appearances, 25 games started, 148 2/3 IP, 89 hits allowed, 52 BB, 194 strikeouts and 3.7 Wins Above Replacement (WAR), all of which established new career-bests to that point. He ranked 10th in WAR among AL pitchers, and his 194 strikeouts ranked seventh, tied with Framber Valdez for the team lead. Javier's 5.4 hits per nine innings (H/9) and nine losses led all Astros pitchers, and his 11.7 K/9 led Astros starters.

In Game 3 of the 2022 American League Championship Series (ALCS) at Yankee Stadium, Javier made and won his postseason starting debut as the Astros prevailed, 5–0. Continuing his previous no-hit effort on June 25, 2022, he held the Yankees hitless for another 3 1/3 innings for a total of 10 1/3 consecutive, tying Mélido Pérez (1991) for most consecutive no-hit innings versus the Yankees by a visiting pitcher. (Note: The 10 consecutive no-hit innings account for all performances in the expansion era, since 1961.) Javier totaled 5 1/3 innings, allowing no runs on one hit, three walks, and striking out five.

In Game 4 of the 2022 World Series at Citizens Bank Park, Javier delivered the first six innings of a combined no-hitter and 5–0 win over the Philadelphia Phillies. Called by catcher Christian Vázquez, it tied the series at 2–2. Bryan Abreu and Rafael Montero both followed with one inning each, and like the no-hit contest in New York, Pressly closed out the ninth. Thus, Javier became the first to start in multiple combined no-hitters in the major leagues. The third no-hitter in MLB postseason history, it was the second in World Series play, following Don Larsen's perfect game in 1956. (Note: The other no-hit contest in postseason play was pitched by Roy Halladay in the 2010 National League Division Series.) The Astros defeated the Phillies in six games to give Javier his first World Series title.

==== 2023 ====
On February 10, 2023, the Astros signed Javier to a 5-year, $64 million contract extension through the 2027 season. He made 31 starts for Houston in 2023, compiling a 10–5 record and 4.56 ERA with 159 strikeouts across 162 innings pitched.

==== 2024 ====
Javier made 7 starts for the Astros in 2024, compiling a 3–1 record and 3.89 ERA with 27 strikeouts across 34 2/3 innings pitched. On June 5, 2024, it was announced that Javier would undergo Tommy John surgery, ending his season prematurely.

==== 2025 ====
On August 11, 2025, Javier was activated from the injured list to make his return from surgery. For the third time, Javier produced an outing of six no-hit innings on August 29 of the Los Angeles Angels; in this case, Houston pitching combined to maintain a 2-hit shutout for a 2–0 win.

==== 2026 ====
On April 10, 2026, Javier was placed on the injured list due to a grade two shoulder strain. He was transferred to the 60-day injured list on April 20. Javier was activated on July 3. Correspondingly, manager Joe Espada announced that Javier would begin pitching out of the bullpen. He made 17 appearances, including 12 starts, and registered 2–6 record, 5.14 ERA, 1.460 WHIP and 59 strikeouts over 63 innings.

== International career ==
Javier made and won his World Baseball Classic (WBC) debut on March 13, 2023. He pitched four scoreless innings in a 6–1 final over Nicaragua.

== Personal life ==
Javier's parents are Trinidad Mieses and Cecilio Javier. His father saw him pitch in Major League Baseball for the first time during a combined no-hitter started by Javier in Game Four of the 2022 World Series. Javier is nicknamed El Reptil.

== See also ==
- List of Houston Astros no-hitters
- List of Major League Baseball no-hitters
- List of Major League Baseball players from the Dominican Republic
- List of World Series starting pitchers

== Notes ==
Achievements
Preceded by Reid Detmers	No-hitter pitcher June 25, 2022 (with Héctor Neris & Ryan Pressly)	Succeeded by Himself, Bryan Abreu, Rafael Montero, & Ryan Pressly
Preceded by Himself, Héctor Neris, & Ryan Pressly	No-hitter pitcher November 2, 2022 (with Bryan Abreu, Rafael Montero & Ryan Pressly)	Succeeded by Domingo Germán
Preceded by Roy Halladay	Postseason no-hitter pitcher November 2, 2022 (with Bryan Abreu, Rafael Montero, & Ryan Pressly)	Succeeded by Most recent
