= Rafael Montero (baseball) =

Dominican baseball player (born 1990)

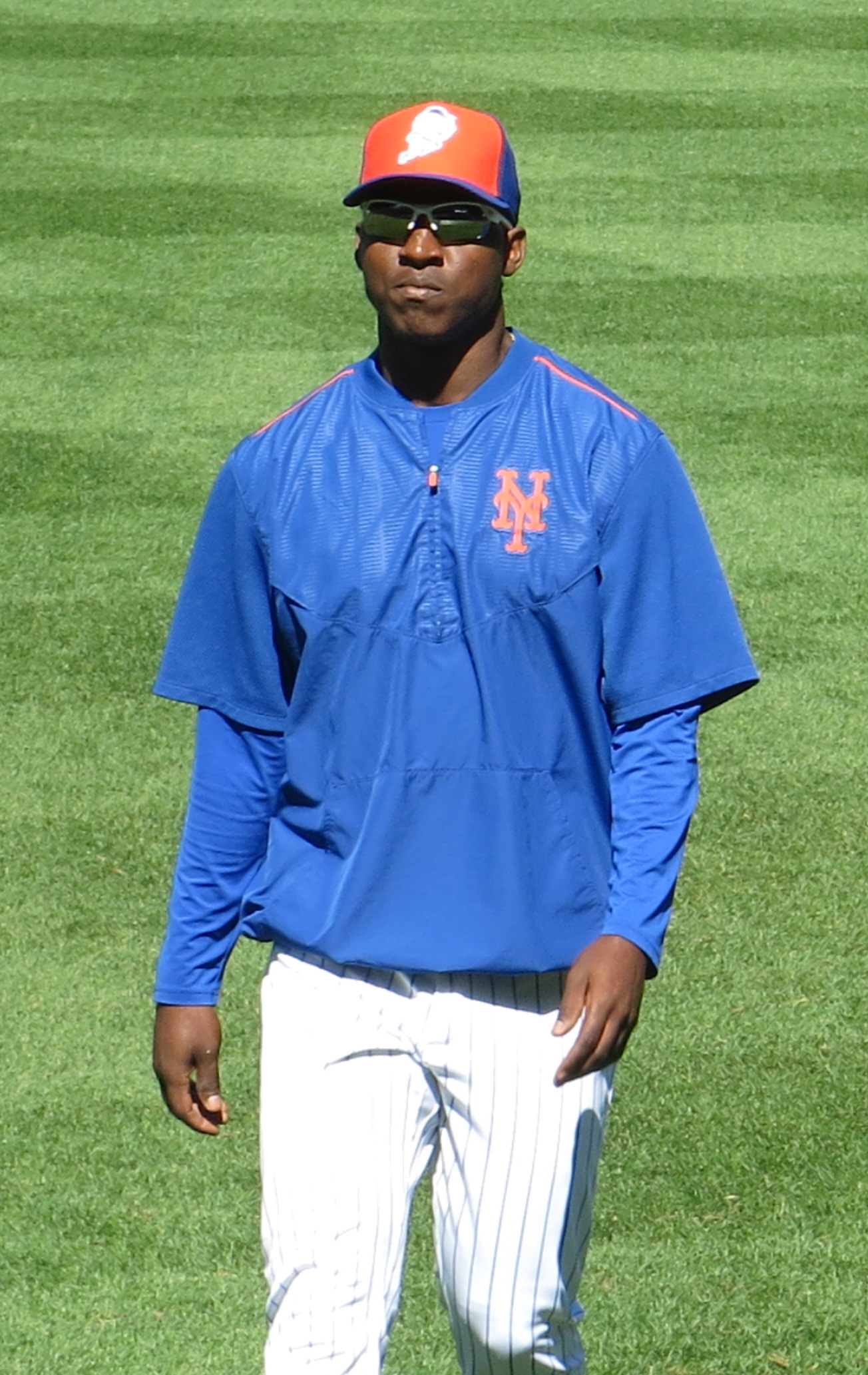
- Montero with the New York Mets in 2016

Free agent
- Pitcher
- Born: October 17, 1990 (age 35); Higuerito, Bánica, Dominican Republic
- Bats: Right Throws: Right

MLB debut
- May 14, 2014, for the New York Mets

MLB statistics (through 2025 season)
- Win–loss record: 23–30
- Earned run average: 4.68
- Strikeouts: 517
- Saves: 30
- Stats at Baseball Reference

Teams
- New York Mets (2014–2017); Texas Rangers (2019–2020); Seattle Mariners (2021); Houston Astros (2021–2025); Atlanta Braves (2025); Detroit Tigers (2025)

Career highlights and awards
- World Series champion (2022); Pitched a combined no-hitter in Game 4 of the 2022 World Series

Rafael Montero (born October 17, 1990) is a Dominican professional baseball pitcher who is a free agent. He has previously played in Major League Baseball (MLB) for the New York Mets, Texas Rangers, Seattle Mariners, Houston Astros, Atlanta Braves, and Detroit Tigers. Montero signed with the Mets as an international free agent in 2011, and made his MLB debut with them in 2014.

== Professional career ==
=== New York Mets ===
==== Minor leagues ====
Montero signed with the New York Mets as an international free agent on January 20, 2011. Nearing his 21st birthday he signed at a much older age than most Dominican players. In his first professional season he went 5-4 with a 2.15 ERA and 66 strikeouts in 71 innings.

In 2012, Montero went 11-5 with a 2.36 ERA, with 110 strikeouts and 19 walks in 122 innings. Prior to the 2013 season, Baseball America ranked him as the Mets' fifth best prospect. He started the season with the Double-A Binghamton Mets. He was promoted to Triple-A Las Vegas 51s in June.

In 2013, with Binghamton and Las Vegas went 12-7 with a 2.43 ERA with Binghamton and a 3.05 ERA with Las Vegas, with 150 strikeouts and 35 walks in 155 1/3 innings pitched.

==== Major leagues (2014–2018) ====
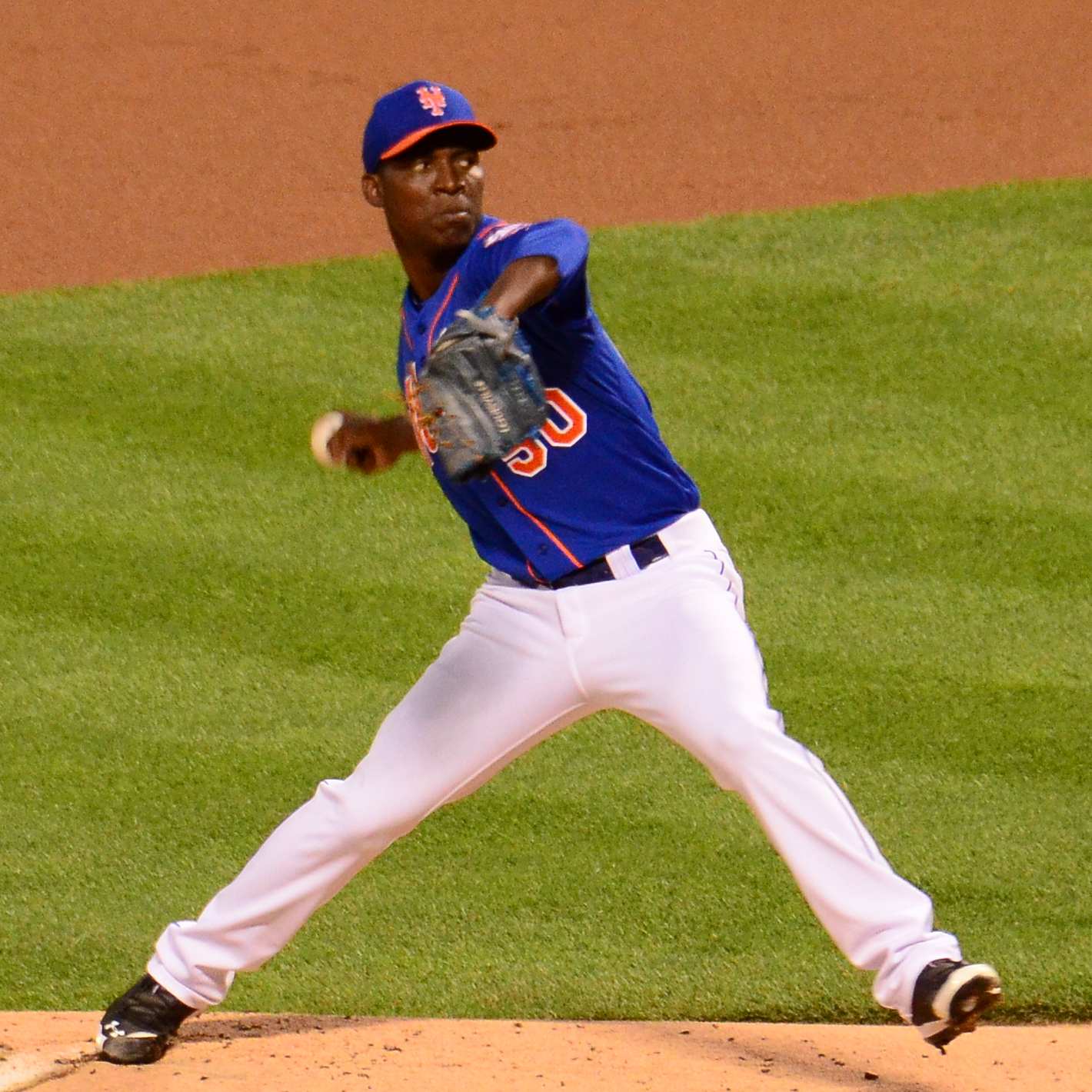
Montero with the Mets in 2014

Montero was promoted on May 14, 2014, with Dillon Gee going to the disabled list with a lat strain. Montero started against the New York Yankees at Citi Field on the same day. In the top of the third inning, Montero recorded his first major league strikeout, by getting Derek Jeter on a 3-2 fastball. He earned his second strikeout against Brett Gardner in the top of the fifth inning. Montero earned the loss as the Mets lost 0-4 as he pitched six innings giving up 5 hits, 3 runs, 2 home runs, 2 walks and struck out 3. He was sent down on May 31 to make room for Buddy Carlyle on the roster. On August 11, pitcher Jacob deGrom went on the disabled list with rotator cuff tendinitis. Montero was called up on August 12 in deGrom's place. On August 23, Montero was re-sent back to the 51s to make room for deGrom coming off the disabled list. He was recalled on September 6 as part of the September call-ups. He was later moved to the bullpen on September 13. Montero finished the season with a 1-3 record, 4.06 ERA in 10 games with 42 strikeouts in 44.1 innings pitched with a WHIP of 1.511 while giving up 44 hits, 21 runs (20 of them earned), 8 home runs, and 23 walks.

On April 17, 2015, Montero was sent down to the 51s to make room for Danny Muno. He was recalled up on April 27 to replace Muno on the roster. A day later he was once again sent down as Jack Leathersich was called up. On April 29, it was discovered that his rotator cuff was swelling and placed on the disabled list. He was placed on the 60-day disabled list on July 24. Montero would never pitch again in 2015. Montero finished the season with a 0-1 record, 4.50 ERA in 5 games (one start) with 13 strikeouts in 10 innings pitched with a WHIP of 1.400 while giving up 9 hits, 6 runs (5 of them earned), and 5 walks.

Montero began the 2016 season with the 51s. He was called up on April 12, with Eric Campbell being demoted to the 51s. Montero made one start with an ERA of 8.02 pitching 19 innings while giving up 23 hits, 17 runs (all earned), 4 walks and 16 strikeouts. In 2017, Montero made 34 appearances (18 starts) for New York, and compiled a 5-11 record and 5.52 ERA with 114 strikeouts over 119 innings of work.

Montero underwent Tommy John surgery after experiencing a tear in the ulnar collateral ligament of the elbow and missed the entire 2018 season. He elected free agency on November 3, 2018.

=== Texas Rangers (2019–2020) ===
On December 4, 2018, Montero signed a minor league contract with the Texas Rangers. Starting on June 17, 2019, Montero made appearances for the rookie-level Arizona League Rangers, Double-A Frisco RoughRiders, and Triple-A Nashville Sounds as he made his way back from Tommy John surgery. On July 22, the Rangers selected Montero's contract and promoted him to the major leagues. With Texas in 2019, Montero went 2–0 with a 2.48 ERA and 34 strikeouts over 29 innings.

The following year, Montero was 8-for-8 in save opportunities, the first saves of his major league career, as he recorded a 4.08 ERA and 1.02 WHIP with 19 strikeouts in 17 2/3 innings during the COVID-19 pandemic-shortened season.

=== Seattle Mariners (2021) ===
On December 15, 2020, Montero was traded to the Seattle Mariners in exchange for Jose Corniell and a player to be named later (PTBNL). The PTBNL, Andres Mesa, was sent to Texas on June 14, 2021.

In 40 games for the Mariners, Montero struggled to a 7.27 ERA with 37 strikeouts. On July 23, 2021, Montero was designated for assignment by the Mariners.

=== Houston Astros ===
==== 2021 ====
On July 27, 2021, Montero was traded to the Houston Astros along with Kendall Graveman in exchange for infielder Abraham Toro and pitcher Joe Smith. He made four appearances for Houston, allowing one unearned run over six innings, three hits, two walks, and struck out five.

==== 2022 ====
Montero avoided arbitration with the Astros on March 22, 2022, agreeing to a $2.275 million contract for the season. He earned his first save of the season on April 28 pitching in the ninth versus the Rangers, while yielding a home run to Corey Seager before closing out a 3–2 win.

Montero struck out two on July 3 in a 4–2 victory over the Los Angeles Angels in which Astros pitchers struck out 20 batters to establish a franchise record in a nine inning contest. Contributing were starter Framber Valdez (first six innings), Héctor Neris (7th), Montero (8th) and Ryan Pressly (9th). (Note: Astros pitching also established a record in that series by becoming the first team in major league history to record 48 strikeouts over a three game series without playing extra innings.) On August 15, Montero endured a rare collapse as he was charged three of four runs in the eighth inning without having recorded an out, taking the loss in a 4–2 defeat versus the Chicago White Sox. On August 31, 2022, Montero closed out the ninth versus the Rangers for his tenth save, the first time he had recorded double-figures in saves in a season.

Over the 2022 regular season, Montero made 71 relief appearances and accumulated 68 1/3 innings, 2.37 ERA, 14 saves, and 5–2 W–L record, and allowed 47 hits, three home runs, and 23 bases on balls with 73 strikeouts. He ranked third in the AL in pitching appearances, and tied for seventh in holds (23), and ranked second on the Astros pitching staff in both holds and saves.

Montero made his postseason debut on October 11, 2022, in Game 1 of the American League Division Series (ALDS). He pitched a clean ninth inning and was the winning pitcher in an 8–7 Astros' walk-off win over the Mariners. Montero appeared in each game of the ALDS, delivered 3 1/3 shutout innings, allowed three total baserunners, and struck out three batters.

On November 2, 2022, Montero relieved Bryan Abreu in the eighth inning of Game 4 of the World Series, with a no-hitter on the line. Montero came close to allowing a hit with two outs in the inning on a line drive to right field, but it was caught with ease by right fielder Kyle Tucker. Montero was then relieved by Ryan Pressly for the 9th inning, who completed the no-hitter. (Note: The other no-hit contest in postseason play was pitched by Roy Halladay in the 2010 National League Division Series.) The Astros defeated the Philadelphia Phillies in six games to give Montero his first career World Series title.

Following the World Series, Montero became a free agent.

==== 2023 ====
On November 15, 2022, Montero re-signed with the Astros on a 3-year, $34.5 million contract. In 68 appearances for Houston in 2023, he struggled to a 5.08 ERA with 79 strikeouts across 67 1/3 innings pitched.

==== 2024 ====
Montero made 41 appearances for Houston in 2024, compiling a 4.70 ERA, 8 home runs, 35 hits, 19 walks with 23 strikeouts and 1.409 walks plus hits per inning pitched (WHIP) in 38 1/3 innings of work. On July 31, 2024, Montero was designated for assignment. He cleared waivers and accepted an outright assignment to the Triple–A Sugar Land Space Cowboys of the Pacific Coast League (PCL) on August 3. At Sugar Land, he made 17 appearances, and registered a 1–1 record and 2.20 ERA allowing 13 hits and 9 walks while recording 24 strikeouts and a 1.347 WHIP in 16 1/3 innings. The Space Cowboys proceeded to win a minor league-best 93 games, the PCL championship, and the Triple-A National Championship Game, both the first championships of their respective type for Sugar Land. While pitching in the minor and winter leagues, Montero increased the usage of his slider and lowered the velocity of his changeup at the Astros' direction.

==== 2025 ====
On March 27, 2025, the Astros selected Montero's contract after he made the team's Opening Day roster. In 3 appearances for Houston, he recorded a 4.50 ERA with 5 strikeouts across 4 innings pitched.

=== Atlanta Braves ===
On April 8, 2025, Montero, along with cash considerations, was traded to the Atlanta Braves in exchange for Patrick Halligan. In 36 games for the Braves, Montero pitched to a 5.50 ERA with 34 strikeouts across 34 1/3 innings pitched.

=== Detroit Tigers ===
On July 30, 2025, the Braves traded Montero to the Detroit Tigers in exchange for Jim Jarvis. Montero made 20 relief appearances for the Tigers, pitching to a 2.86 ERA with 19 strikeouts across 22 innings.

=== New York Yankees ===
On February 12, 2026, Montero signed a minor league contract with the New York Yankees. He made 28 appearances (one start) for the Triple–A Scranton/Wilkes-Barre RailRiders, posting a 1–4 record and 5.67 ERA with 33 strikeouts and two saves over 27 innings of work. Montero was released by the Yankees on August 11.

== Personal life ==
Montero and his wife, Yasmina, have one daughter, born in 2020.

== See also ==
- List of Houston Astros no-hitters
- List of Major League Baseball no-hitters
- List of Major League Baseball players from the Dominican Republic

Achievements
Preceded by Cristian Javier, Héctor Neris, & Ryan Pressly	No-hitter pitcher November 2, 2022 (with Cristian Javier, Bryan Abreu, & Ryan Pressly)	Succeeded by Domingo Germán
Preceded by Roy Halladay	Postseason no-hitter pitcher November 2, 2022 (with Cristian Javier, Bryan Abreu, & Ryan Pressly)	Succeeded by Most recent
