= Bryan Abreu =

Dominican baseball player (born 1997)

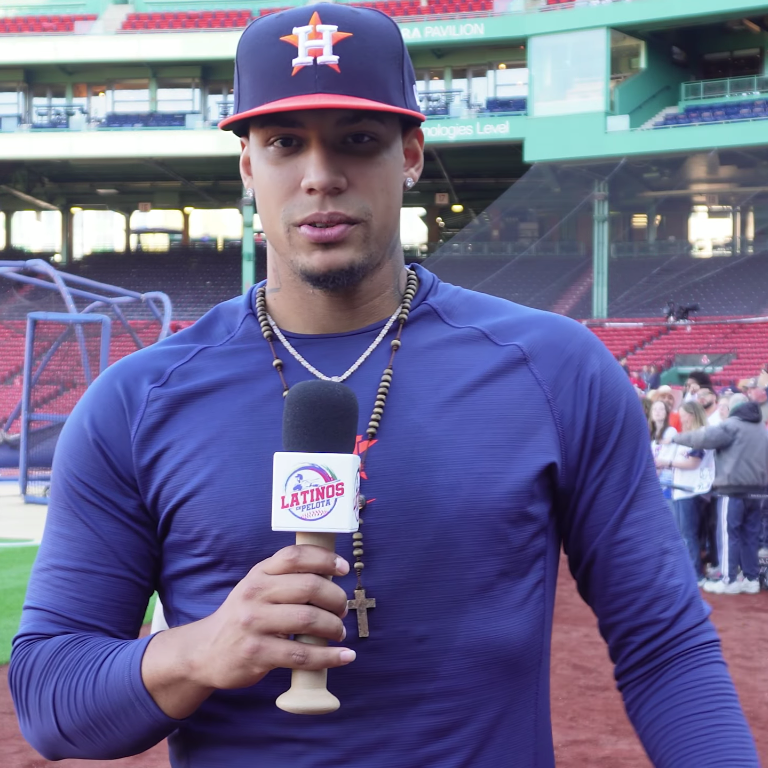
- Abreu with the Houston Astros in 2026

Free agent
- Pitcher
- Born: April 22, 1997 (age 29); Santo Domingo, Dominican Republic
- Bats: Right Throws: Right

MLB debut
- July 31, 2019, for the Houston Astros

MLB statistics (through 2026 season)
- Win–loss record: 22–16
- Earned run average: 2.82
- Strikeouts: 528
- Stats at Baseball Reference

Teams
- Houston Astros (2019–2026)

Career highlights and awards
- World Series champion (2022); Pitched a combined no-hitter in Game 4 of the 2022 World Series

Bryan Enrique Abreu (born April 22, 1997) is a Dominican professional baseball pitcher who is a free agent. He has played in Major League Baseball (MLB) for the Houston Astros Abreu signed with the Astros as an international free agent in 2013, and made his major league debut in 2019.

== Early life ==
Bryan Abreu was born in Santo Domingo in the Dominican Republic. At age 13, he worked in construction and assisted an uncle, a mechanic, in repairing cars. Tall and notably athletic, the first sport Abreu began playing was basketball, and when he was 14, began playing baseball. It was at age 14 that his mother suggested that he choose a sport on which to focus, and Abreu chose baseball.

== Career ==
=== Houston Astros ===
==== 2013–18 ====
Abreu signed with the Houston Astros as an international free agent in November 2013. He made his professional debut in 2014 with the Dominican Summer League Astros, going 0–2 (win–loss record, W–L) with a 6.55 earned run average over 22 relief innings pitched.

Starting in 2014 and throughout his professional baseball career in the Houston Astros organization, Abreu has worked extensively with pitching coach Erick Abreu, who has also served in various levels within the Astros' minor league system.

Bryan Abreu returned to the Dominican Summer League Astros in 2015, earning a 2–2 record and a 3.83 earned run average over 14 games (ten starts). In 2016, he began the year with the Greeneville Astros before being reassigned to the Gulf Coast League Astros. Over 38 2/3 innings, he went 2–5 with a 4.89 earned run average.

In 2017, Abreu returned to Greeneville and compiled a 1–3 record with a 7.98 earned run average in eight games (six starts), and in 2018, he pitched for both the Tri-City ValleyCats and the Quad Cities River Bandits, going 6–1 with a 1.49 earned run average over 14 games (seven starts). The Astros added Abreu to their 40-man roster after the 2018 season.

==== 2019–22 ====
In 2019, he began the year with the Fayetteville Woodpeckers before being promoted to the Corpus Christi Hooks, with whom he was named a Texas League All-Star.

On July 31, 2019, the Astros promoted Abreu to the major leagues. He made his major league debut that night, pitching a scoreless inning in relief. The following day, he was optioned back to Double-A Corpus Christi. In 2020, Abreu struggled with accuracy, walking seven batters and hitting two in 3 1/3 innings before being optioned off the roster.

Abreu closed out the last three outs on July 23, 2022, in a 3–1 win versus the Seattle Mariners for his first save on the season.

He authored a breakout season in 2022, appearing in career-high 55 games, and produced a 1.94 earned run average, 4–0 won-loss record, two saves, 2.12 fielding independent pitching (FIP) and 88 strikeouts, leading the Astros with 13.1 strikeouts per nine innings (K/9).

In a three-game sweep of the Mariners in the 2022 American League Division Series (ALDS), Abreu appeared in each game, delivering 3 1/3 shutout innings, allowing two total baserunners, and striking out six. In Game 4 of the 2022 World Series, Abreu struck out the side in the seventh inning of a 5–0 combined no-hitter of the Philadelphia Phillies. He relieved starting pitcher Cristian Javier, and Rafael Montero and Ryan Pressly followed Abreu. It was the third no-hitter in major league postseason history, and the second in World Series play, following Don Larsen's perfect game in 1956. (Note: The other no-hit contest in postseason play was pitched by Roy Halladay in the 2010 National League Division Series.) The Astros defeated the Phillies in six games to give Abreu his first career World Series title. Abreu pitched 11 1/3 shutout innings in the 2022 postseason, appearing in 10 of the Astros' 13 contests, and struck out 19 batters.

==== 2023 ====
Through the end of the 2023 regular season, Abreu carried a 27 2/3 scoreless innings streak, the longest in the American League (AL) by a reliever in 2023. The streak spanned into the postseason to 33, including the American League Championship Series (ALCS).

==== 2024–26 ====
On September 18, 2024, Abreu logged his 100th strikeout, a second consecutive season with the total. He joined Octavio Dotel (2001–02) and Brad Lidge (2004–06) as the only relievers to achieve the feat as members of the Astros. Abreu led MLB in holds with 38, and was second in the AL in pitching appearances with 78, a career high. He was 3–3 with a 3.10 ERA, 78 1/3 innings, 32 BB, 103 SO, and 1.162 walks plus hits per inning pitched (WHIP). In the AL Wild Card Series (WCS), Abreu made one appearance, posting 1 1/3 scoreless inning while striking out 2 versus the Detroit Tigers, who eventually swept the best-of-3 series.

On January 9, 2025, the Astros signed Abreu to a $3.45 million contract for the season, avoiding arbitration. In 18 of his first 20 outings of the season, Abreu had remained unscored upon until surrendering a go-ahead home run to Cal Raleigh on May 23, 2025, to blow a save opportunity and take the 5–3 loss to the Mariners. For the season, Abreu appeared in 70 contests, accrued 7 saves, 19 games finished, and yielded a 2.28 ERA, 51 hits, 18 runs, four home runs, 31 walks, and struck out a career-high 105 over 71 innings. Abreu equaled Lidge for a club-record third successive campaign with 100 or more strikeouts, and was the third reliever with three total, also joining Billy Wagner. (Note: Number of seasons player meets criteria, At least 80% games in relief, playing for HOU, in the regular season, requiring strikeouts ≥ 100, sorted by descending instances.)

In 2026, Abreu was recognized by the BBWAA's Houston chapter as winner of the Darryl Kile Good Guy Award. He ranked tenth in the American League (AL) in strikeouts (80). Over the first half of the season, he struggled with a 5.81 ERA, but rebounded with a 1.71 showing during the second half. Overall, Abreu went 6–4 and 3.73 ERA during 66 games and 62 2/3 innings, 28 games finished, 9 saves, and 1.356 WHIP. During the Wild Card Series, Abreu made two appearances and worked 3 2/3 innings, allowing one run and one hit. Seven of the eight outs he recorded were via strikeout. However, the Chicago White Sox swept the Astros to eliminate them from the playoffs.

== International career ==
Abreu made his World Baseball Classic (WBC) debut in 2023, pitching for the Dominican Republic.

== See also ==
- List of Houston Astros no-hitters
- List of Major League Baseball no-hitters
- List of Major League Baseball players from the Dominican Republic

== Notes ==
Achievements
Preceded by Cristian Javier, Héctor Neris, & Ryan Pressly	No-hitter pitcher November 2, 2022 (with Cristian Javier, Rafael Montero & Ryan Pressly)	Succeeded by Domingo Germán
Preceded by Roy Halladay	Postseason no-hitter pitcher November 2, 2022 (with Cristian Javier, Rafael Montero & Ryan Pressly)	Succeeded by Most recent
