= Defenders of the Game =

- Genre: Animated series
- Created by: Onesum Agency
- Starring: Carl Crawford; Scott Kazmir; Rocco Baldelli; James Shields; Carlos Peña; B. J. Upton; Joe Maddon; Don Zimmer
- Opening theme: by "Othentic"
- Country of origin: Canada
- No. of seasons: 2
- No. of episodes: 11

Production
- Running time: 60-90 seconds (per episode)

Original release
- Network: Tropicana Field

Defenders of the Game is an original animated family adventure series that was developed by Onesum Agency in Montreal for the Tampa Bay Devil Rays during their 2007 season, as an in-game entertainment experience. The series portrayed several key Devil Ray players as super heroes, and featured the voices and likenesses of Carl Crawford, Scott Kazmir, Rocco Baldelli, Coach Joe Maddon, and Special Advisor Don Zimmer. In the fictional series, the superhero Defenders had to save the game of baseball from the machinations or the evil Umperor. For the 2008 season, the renamed Tampa Bay Rays, ordered another season of entirely original animated episodes featuring the same characters as the previous season with the exception of Rocco Baldelli who was on the disabled list, as well as new players Carlos Peña, James Shields, and B. J. Upton. While the evil Umperor was mentioned during the second season, the Defenders battled new villains including the Dr. Stat and Ms. Vinta.

== Characters ==
The series features the Tampa Bay Rays franchise and players as super heroes defending baseball from the evil “Umperor”.

=== The heroes ===
- Carl Crawford as Streak
- Scott Kazmir as Ace
- James Shields as Hypnotic
- Carlos Peña as Sluggernaught
- B. J. Upton as Bossman Junior
- Rocco Baldeli as Stretch (season one only)
- Joe Maddon as Coach Joe (Himself)
- Don Zimmer as The Guardian

=== The villains ===
- The Umperor
- Dr. Stat
- Ms. Vinta

== Episodes ==
=== Season I ===
Ep. 1- “Something is rotten in Tampa Bay”
The evil Umperor (series villain) attempts to destroy Tropicana field. Team coach, Joe Madden freezes time, and leads Carl Crawford, Scott Kazimir and Rocco Baldeli to secret headquarters under Tropicana field.

Ep. 2- “Behind The Curtain”
As Joe leads the players into the secret headquarters, he explains how the Umperor has been trying to corrupt and destroy baseball since its creation. He then explains how a Guardian was appointed to protect baseball, revealing the current Guardian, Don Zimmer (Zim).

Ep.3- “Power Up”
The Guardian gives the players super powers from the energy force of baseball, called “the zone”. Their powers are based on their natural abilities; speed, reach and sonic energy. They are then deemed “The Defenders of the Game”.

Ep.4- “Let’s Play Baller-Bot”
Joe unfreezes time, and the Defenders begin to defeat the Baller-Bots. Throughout the episode the Defenders adopt names such as; Ace, Stretch and Streak. It concludes with the Defenders being overwhelmed, and not sure if they can defeat the Baller-Bots.

Ep.5- “Three Strikes And They’re Down, But Not Out”
Joe freezes time again so that the Guardian can give the Defenders a lesson on teamwork. When they go back to fight the Baller-Bots, the evil Umperor appears and saving Tropicana field seems like a lost cause.

Ep.6- “You’re Out”
The Defenders begins to work as a team; they manage to go back in time to prevent the Umperor’s Baller-Bots from ever arriving. They are able to defeat the Umperor and save their fans and their stadium.

=== Season II ===
Ep.1- “The Boyz Are Back in Town”
In this episode Streak and Ace the old defenders are reintroduced, and three new unnamed defenders join the team. Towards the end of the episode, the Defenders, Zim the Guardian and Joe find out that they are about to meet a new unknown villain.

Ep.2 – “Stats All Folks - Part 1”
In this episode Dr. Stat, the new villain who is obsessed with useless baseball statistics, comes in contact with the team of Defenders and threatens to destroy their Tropicana field. The names of the new Defenders are then revealed, Hypnotic, Sluggernaught and Bossman Junior.

Ep.3 – “Stats All Folks - Part 2”
The team of defenders take the ray, their new vehicle into space to Dr. Stat’s satellite. They manage to defeat his stats bots, capture him and destroy his satellite.

Ep.4 – “Welcome To Vinta Vonderland Part 1”
The team of Defenders notice that it is snowing in Tropicana field, unaware of the cause behind it, the team mascot, Raymond, explains that he came across someone with an evil plan. This is when the Defenders meet the new villain, Ms. Vinta who threatens to freeze over Tropicana field indefinitely.

Ep.5 – “Welcome To Vinta Vonderland Part 2”
The team of Defenders go out to save Tropicana field from being permanently frozen by Ms. Vinta, when they realize that all they need is Bossman to warm her heart and end her evil streak.
