= Jordan Montgomery =

American baseball player (born 1992)

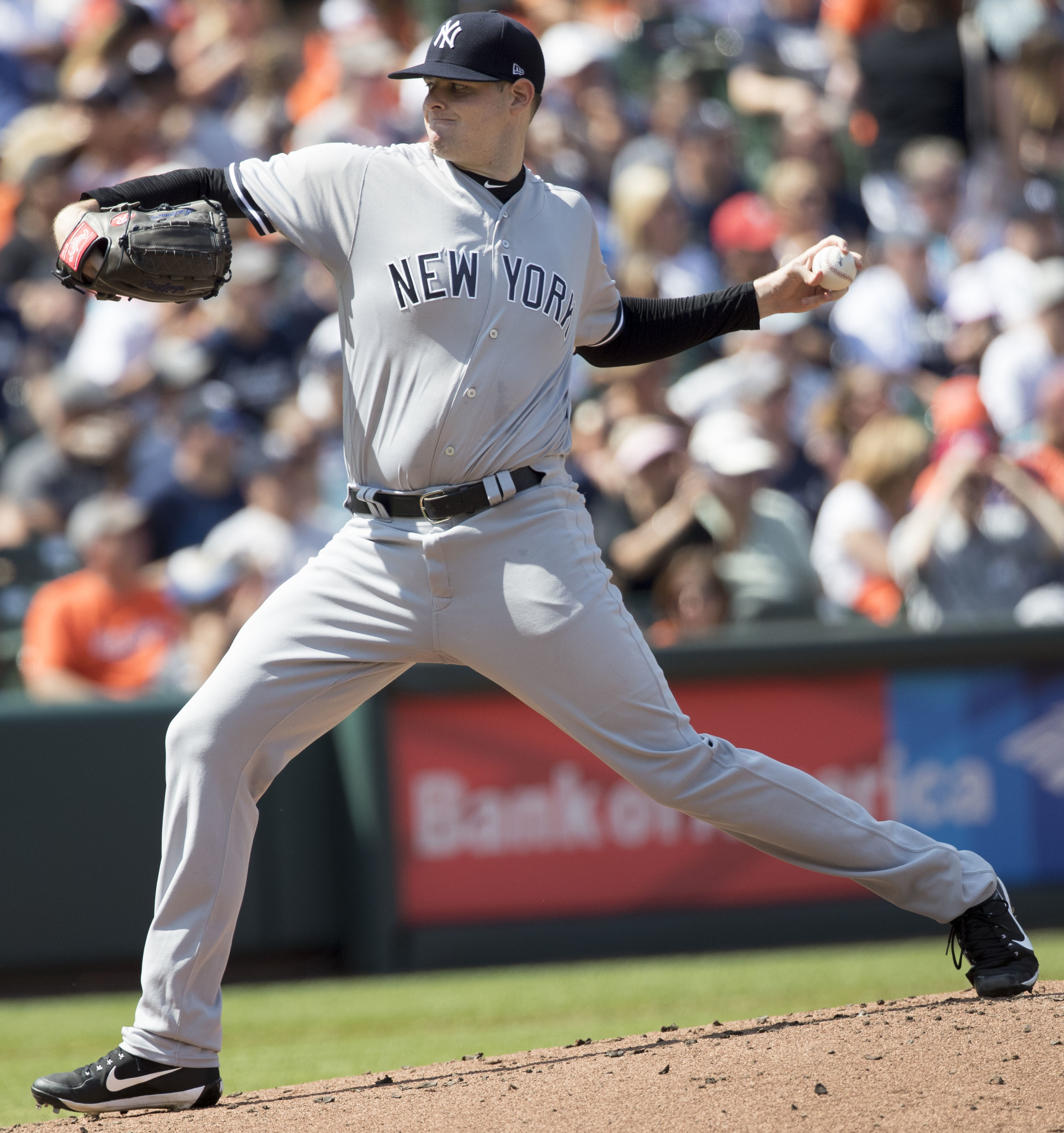
- Montgomery with the New York Yankees in 2017

Free agent
- Pitcher
- Born: December 27, 1992 (age 33); Sumter, South Carolina, U.S.
- Bats: Left Throws: Left

MLB debut
- April 12, 2017, for the New York Yankees

MLB statistics (through 2026 season)
- Win–loss record: 47–41
- Earned run average: 4.03
- Strikeouts: 808
- Stats at Baseball Reference

Teams
- New York Yankees (2017–2022); St. Louis Cardinals (2022–2023); Texas Rangers (2023); Arizona Diamondbacks (2024); Texas Rangers (2026)

Career highlights and awards
- World Series champion (2023)

Jordan Blackmon Montgomery (born December 27, 1992), nicknamed "Gumby" or "Monty", is an American professional baseball pitcher who is a free agent. He has played in Major League Baseball (MLB) for the New York Yankees, St. Louis Cardinals, Texas Rangers, and Arizona Diamondbacks.

Before his professional career, Montgomery played college baseball for the South Carolina Gamecocks. The Yankees selected him in the 2014 MLB draft, and he made his MLB debut in 2017. The Yankees traded Montgomery to the Cardinals in 2022, and the Cardinals traded him to the Texas Rangers, where he won his first championship in the 2023 World Series. After spending two years with the Diamondbacks, he returned to the Rangers for the 2026 season.

== Early life ==
Jordan Blackmon Montgomery was born on December 27, 1992, in Sumter, South Carolina. He attended Sumter High School where he played for the school's baseball team, being named the state's player of the year as a senior. He also won a high school state championship in 2011 and was later named Pitcher of the Decade in South Carolina by Diamond Prospects.

== College career ==
Montgomery attended the University of South Carolina and played college baseball for the South Carolina Gamecocks. He was named Southeastern Conference Freshman of the Week on April 9, 2012 and a Freshman All-American. He received the nickname "Gumby" in college from a teammate due to his long limbs and lack of coordination.

== Professional career ==
=== Draft and minor leagues ===
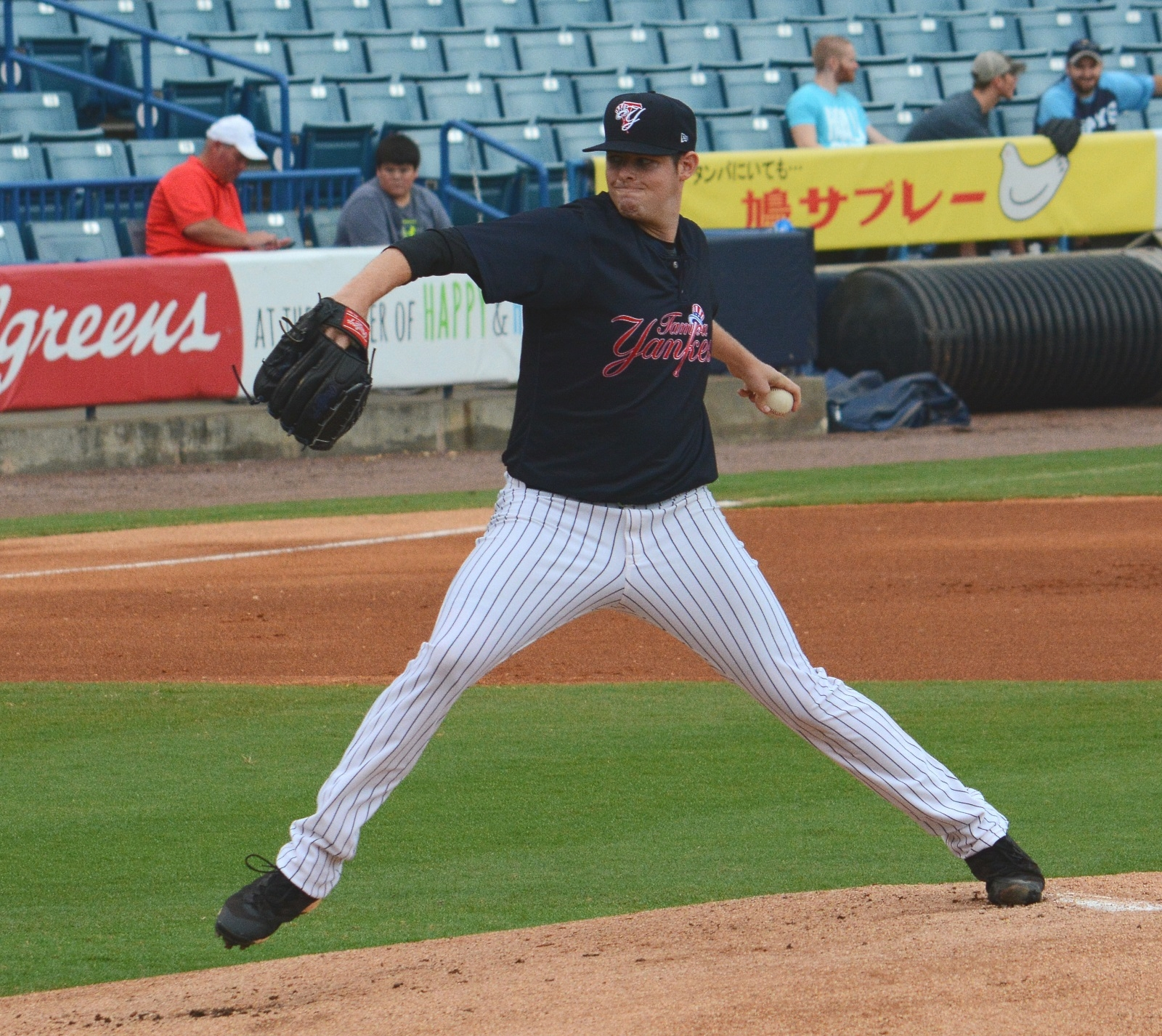
Montgomery with the Tampa Yankees in 2015

The New York Yankees selected Montgomery in the fourth round, with the 122nd overall selection, of the 2014 Major League Baseball draft. He signed with the Yankees, receiving a $424,000 signing bonus. He pitched for the Gulf Coast Yankees of the Rookie-level Gulf Coast League and the Staten Island Yankees of the Low–A New York–Penn League, pitching to a 1–1 win–loss record with a 3.79 earned run average (ERA) in 19 innings pitched, as the Yankees limited his workload after the college season. In 2015, he began the season with for the Charleston RiverDogs of the Single–A South Atlantic League. The Yankees promoted him to the Tampa Yankees of the High–A Florida State League in June.

Montgomery began the 2016 season with the Trenton Thunder of the Double–A Eastern League and was promoted to the Scranton/Wilkes-Barre RailRiders of the Triple–A International League in August. He pitched in the Triple-A National Championship Game, earning the win.

Montgomery received a non-roster invitation to spring training in 2017, and competed for a job in their Opening Day starting rotation.

=== New York Yankees (2017–2022) ===
After starting the season at Triple-A for the Scranton/Wilkes-Barre RailRiders, the Yankees promoted Montgomery to the major leagues on April 12, 2017. In his major league debut against the Tampa Bay Rays, Montgomery received a no-decision as he allowed three runs (two earned) in 4 2/3 innings, striking out seven. On April 17, in his second major league start, Montgomery earned his first major league win against the Chicago White Sox. On June 9 against the Baltimore Orioles, Montgomery pitched a career-high seven innings and struck out a career-high eight batters. Montgomery tied those same career highs in a June 26 start against the White Sox. Prior to the All-Star Break, Montgomery pitched to a 3.65 ERA, striking out 87 batters in 91 1/3 innings. On July 25, against the Cincinnati Reds, Montgomery took a no-hitter into the sixth inning before Scott Schebler hit a double to break up the bid. On August 6, he was optioned to Triple-A. He was recalled on August 11 after CC Sabathia suffered a knee injury. On August 12, Montgomery was struck in the head by an errant foul ball during batting practice while signing autographs prior to the game; he was not seriously hurt. In 29 starts in 2017, Montgomery finished with a 9–7 record and a 3.88 ERA.

On May 1, 2018, Montgomery left a game against the Houston Astros after one inning due to elbow tightness. He went on the disabled list the next day with a flexor strain and he would miss six to eight weeks. However, on June 5, it was announced that Montgomery tore his ulnar collateral ligament while throwing on flat ground during rehab a few days prior and would undergo Tommy John surgery, ending his season. In six starts in 2018, Montgomery finished with a 2–0 record and a 3.62 ERA.

Montgomery started the 2019 season on the 60-day injured list while still recovering from the previous season's surgery. He returned to the Yankees on September 15. In 2020, Montgomery pitched to a 5.11 ERA with 47 strikeouts in 44 innings pitched, while on defense he led all AL pitchers in errors, with three. In 2021, Montgomery had a 6–7 record and 3.83 ERA in 157 1/3 innings.

=== St. Louis Cardinals (2022–2023) ===
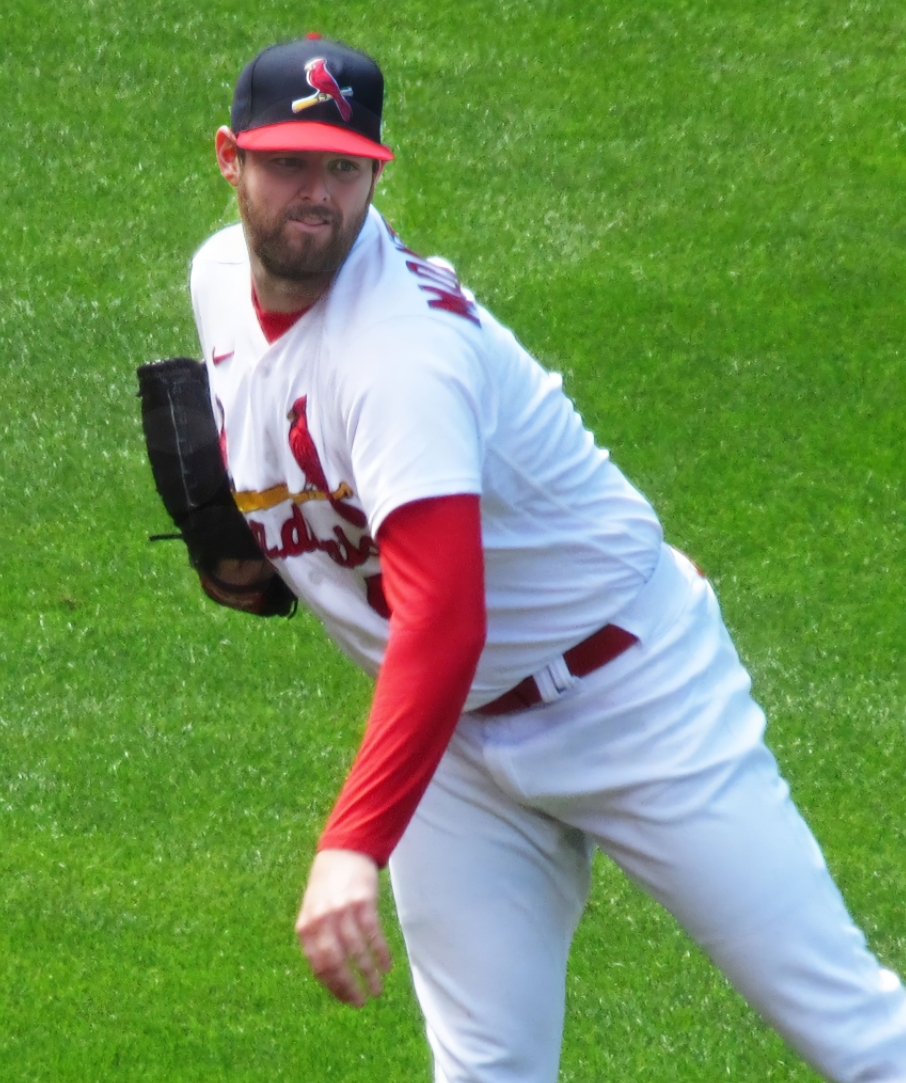
Montgomery with the St. Louis Cardinals in 2022

The Yankees traded Montgomery to the St. Louis Cardinals in exchange for Harrison Bader and a player to be named later or cash considerations on August 2, 2022. He made his Cardinal debut on August 6, throwing five scoreless innings before being taken out due to cramping caused by dehydration, versus the Yankees in a 1–0 win for the Cardinals at Busch Stadium. On August 22, 2022, Montgomery pitched his first complete game in the major leagues, a one-hit, 99-pitch Maddux against the Chicago Cubs. He finished the 2022 season with a 9–6 record and a 3.48 ERA in 32 games started. Montgomery pitched in relief for the Cardinals in Game 2 of the 2022 NL Wild Card Series as the Philadelphia Phillies swept the Cardinals, two games to none.

On January 13, 2023, Montgomery agreed to a one-year, $10 million contract with the Cardinals, avoiding salary arbitration. He had a 6–9 record and a 3.42 ERA in 21 starts for the Cardinals in 2023.

=== Texas Rangers (2023) ===
On July 30, 2023, the Cardinals traded Montgomery and Chris Stratton to the Texas Rangers in exchange for John King, Tekoah Roby, and Thomas Saggese. He wore uniform number 52 to honor former teammate CC Sabathia. Montgomery started 11 games for the Rangers, pitching to a 2.79 ERA. For the regular season, Montgomery set career-highs with 10 wins, a 3.20 ERA, 166 strikeouts, and 188 2/3 innings pitched.

The Rangers made the 2023 MLB postseason and Montgomery started Game 1 of the 2023 American League Wild Card Series. Montgomery earned the win, pitching seven scoreless innings as Texas defeated the Tampa Bay Rays, 4-0. Montgomery also started Game Two of the 2023 American League Division Series; he pitched four innings and did not receive a decision in the Rangers' 11-8 victory over the Baltimore Orioles. In the 2023 American League Championship Series, Montgomery appeared in three games and earned two victories as the Rangers defeated the Houston Astros, four games to three. He started Game One against Astros starter Justin Verlander and pitched 6 1/3 shutout innings, earning a 2-0 win. Montgomery also started Game Five of the 2023 ALCS; he hurled 5 1/3 innings, gave up two earned runs, and did not receive a decision in the Rangers' 5-4 loss. In Game Seven, Montgomery pitched 2 1/3 innings of scoreless relief and earned the win in the Rangers' series-clinching 11-4 victory.

The Rangers faced the Arizona Diamondbacks in the 2023 World Series. Montgomery started Game Two and took the loss, giving up four earned runs in six innings; the Diamondbacks won the game, 9-1. On November 1, the Rangers won the 2023 World Series, defeating the Diamondbacks four games to one. This was the first World Series championship of Montgomery's career and the first World Series victory in Rangers franchise history. Montgomery had a 2.90 ERA in 31 innings in the postseason.

=== Arizona Diamondbacks (2024–2025) ===
On March 29, 2024, two days before Opening Day, Montgomery signed a one-year, $25 million contract with the Arizona Diamondbacks that included a $20 million vesting player option for the 2025 season. Without any spring training action, he was optioned to Triple–A Reno Aces to begin the season. On April 11, Montgomery fired his agent Scott Boras and later stated that Boras "butchered" his free agency.

Montgomery was recalled on April 19 and later made his Diamondback debut that same day against the San Francisco Giants, allowed just one run over six innings. On July 2, Montgomery was placed on the 15-day injured list with right knee inflammation. He was reinstated on July 23 and allowed one run over five innings against the Kansas City Royals, earning the win. However, following 19 starts where he accumulated a 6.44 ERA over 95 innings pitched, the Diamondbacks announced on August 23 that Montgomery would move to the bullpen. Montgomery finished the 2024 season with a 6.23 ERA in 25 games (21 starts), and Diamondbacks principal owner Ken Kendrick later stated that signing Montgomery was "a horrible decision".

On March 25, 2025, the Diamondbacks announced that Montgomery would undergo Tommy John surgery and miss the entirety of the 2025 season. On July 31, the Diamondbacks traded Montgomery and Shelby Miller to the Milwaukee Brewers in exchange for a player to be named later.

=== Second stint with Rangers (2026–present) ===
On February 13, 2026, Montgomery returned to the Texas Rangers, signing a one-year, $1.25 million contract. On August 7, Montgomery was activated for his season debut and return from surgery.

== Personal life ==
Montgomery has two older brothers. He met his wife, Mckenzie (née Dirr), in 2017 when they were introduced by a teammate of Montgomery's. They married in December 2022. She studied medicine at the Medical University of South Carolina.
