= Royce Lewis =

American baseball player (born 1999)

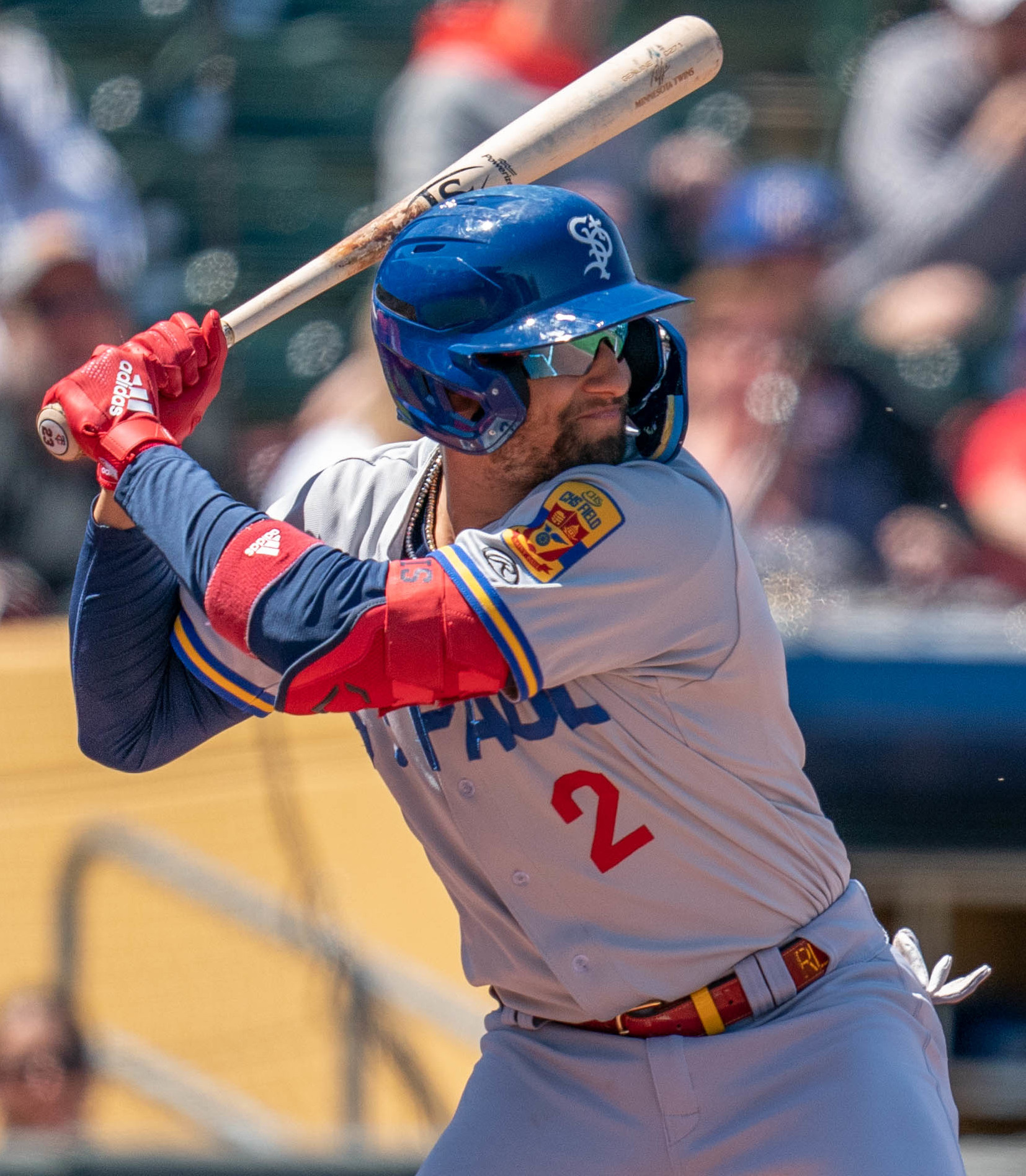
- Lewis with the St. Paul Saints in 2022

Los Angeles Dodgers
- Infielder
- Born: June 5, 1999 (age 27); Aliso Viejo, California, U.S.
- Bats: Right Throws: Right

MLB debut
- May 6, 2022, for the Minnesota Twins

MLB statistics (through 2026 season)
- Batting average: .246
- Home runs: 61
- Runs batted in: 213
- Stats at Baseball Reference

Teams
- Minnesota Twins (2022–2026)
Medals
Men's baseball
Representing United States
15U Baseball World Cup
Silver medal – second place	2014 Mazatlán	Team

Royce Oliver Lewis (born June 5, 1999) is an American professional baseball infielder for the Los Angeles Dodgers of Major League Baseball (MLB). He was drafted by the Minnesota Twins first overall in the 2017 MLB draft. Lewis made his MLB debut in 2022 with the Twins.

== Amateur career ==
Lewis attended JSerra Catholic High School in San Juan Capistrano, California. As a junior, he was the Los Angeles Times high school baseball player of the year after hitting .429 with four home runs. In summer 2016, he played in the Under Armour All-American Game at Wrigley Field and the Perfect Game All-American Classic at Petco Park, and was named MVP of both games. Lewis played mostly third base and outfield his first three years of high school before moving to shortstop for his senior year.

Lewis was considered one of the top prospects for the 2017 Major League Baseball draft. He committed to the University of California, Irvine to play college baseball. He was named California's Baseball Gatorade Player of the Year in 2017 after batting .377 with four home runs and 25 stolen bases as a senior.

== Professional career ==
=== Minnesota Twins ===
==== Minor leagues ====
The Minnesota Twins selected Lewis with the first overall selection of the 2017 draft. The Twins announced his signing on June 17, and Lewis made his professional debut with the Gulf Coast League Twins of the Rookie-level Gulf Coast League on June 26. On August 12, Lewis was promoted to the Cedar Rapids Kernels of the Single-A Midwest League. He finished 2017 with a combined .279 batting average, four home runs, 27 RBIs, and 18 stolen bases in 54 games between both clubs. Lewis began the 2018 season with Cedar Rapids. In 75 games for Cedar Rapids, he batted .315 with nine home runs and 53 RBIs along with fifty runs scored and 22 stolen bases.

On July 14, 2018, Lewis was promoted to the Fort Myers Miracle of the High-A Florida State League. On July 26, 2018 MLB.com ranked Lewis as the 10th best prospect in baseball. Lewis ended his stint in Fort Myers batting .255 with five home runs and 21 RBIs in 46 games. Following the 2018 season, Lewis was named to the Midwest League postseason all-star team along with teammate Alex Kirilloff. Lewis was also named the MVP of the Midwest League.

The Twins invited Lewis to spring training as a non-roster player in 2019. He returned to Fort Myers to begin the 2019 season. He was ranked the fifth-best prospect by MLB.com at the beginning of the 2019 season. Lewis was named to the 2019 All-Star Futures Game. In July, he was promoted to the Pensacola Blue Wahoos of the Double-A Southern League. Over 127 games between the two clubs, he slashed .236/.290/.371 with 12 home runs, 49 RBIs, and 22 stolen bases. He was selected to play in the Arizona Fall League for the Salt River Rafters following the season. Lewis was named the 2019 Arizona Fall League MVP. Lewis did not play in a game in 2020 due to the cancellation of the minor league season because of the COVID-19 pandemic.

On February 24, 2021, Lewis was diagnosed with a torn anterior cruciate ligament (ACL) in his right knee and had surgery set for February 26. The injury required nine months of recovery, causing Lewis to miss the 2021 season. He was selected to the 40-man roster following the season.

==== Major leagues ====
Lewis made his MLB debut for the Twins on May 6, 2022. On May 13, Lewis hit his first career home run, a grand slam off of Cleveland Guardians reliever Bryan Shaw. He became the second player in Twins history to hit a grand slam for his first career home run, joining Danny Valencia. Lewis appeared in 12 games for Minnesota, batting .300/.317/.550 with 2 home runs and 5 RBI. On May 29, Lewis re-tore the ACL in his right knee. Lewis elected to undergo season-ending surgery to repair the injury.

On May 29, 2023, Lewis was activated from the injured list and made his season debut as the starting third baseman. On August 27, with the Twins down five runs to the Texas Rangers, Lewis began his team's comeback by hitting a grand slam, leading the Twins to a 7-6 victory. The following day he hit another grand slam, becoming the first Twins player to hit a grand slam in consecutive games, and providing the margin of victory in a 10-6 victory over the Cleveland Guardians. It was the third grand slam of his career, achieved in his 50th career game. On September 4, he tied the Twins franchise record with his third grand slam of the season. His fourth grand slam on September 15 set the new franchise record. Lewis went on the injured list on September 22, ending his regular season. In 18 games, Lewis slashed .313/.410/.612 with six home runs and 23 RBIs. He was named the AL Rookie of the Month.

The Twins activated Lewis for Game 1 of the 2023 AL Wild Card Series. Lewis hit home runs in his first two at bats. He hit his fourth home run of the postseason in Game 4 of the 2023 ALDS, tying Kirby Puckett for the most home runs in one postseason for the Twins.

On Opening Day of the 2024 season, Lewis strained a quadriceps, and went on the injured list on March 30.

Prior to the 2026 season, Lewis and the Twins agreed on a one-year deal for $2.85 million to avoid salary arbitration.

=== Los Angeles Dodgers ===
On November 20, 2026, the Twins traded Lewis to the Los Angeles Dodgers in exchange for Bobby Miller and Francisco Espinoza.
