= Pablo López (baseball) =

Venezuelan baseball player (born 1996)

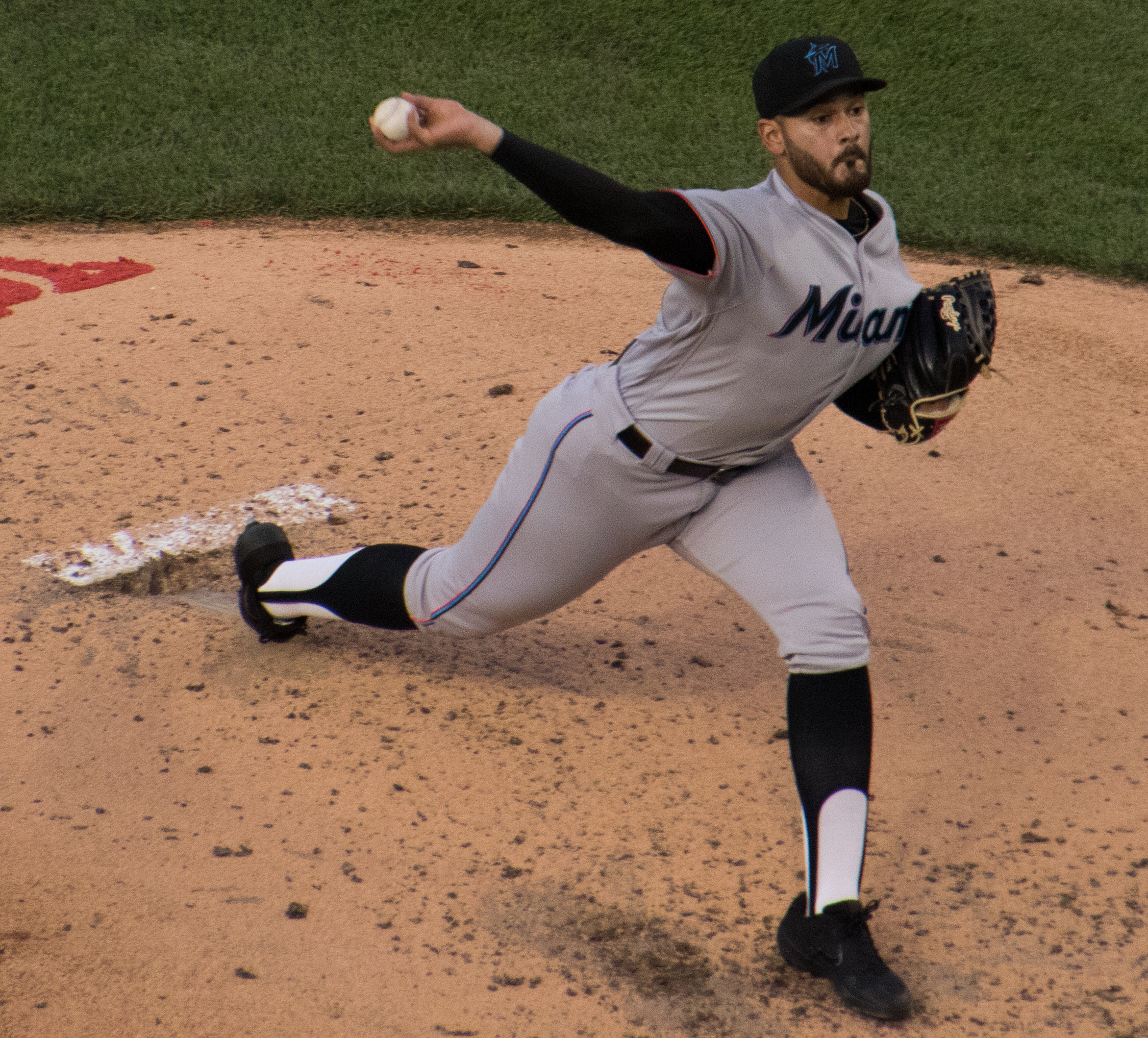
- López with the Miami Marlins in 2019

Minnesota Twins – No. 49
- Pitcher
- Born: March 7, 1996 (age 30); Cabimas, Venezuela
- Bats: Left Throws: Right

MLB debut
- June 30, 2018, for the Miami Marlins

MLB statistics (through 2025 season)
- Win–loss record: 59–53
- Earned run average: 3.81
- Strikeouts: 994
- Stats at Baseball Reference

Teams
- Miami Marlins (2018–2022); Minnesota Twins (2023–2025)

Career highlights and awards
- All-Star (2023)

Pablo José López Serra (born March 7, 1996) is a Venezuelan professional baseball pitcher for the Minnesota Twins of Major League Baseball (MLB). He has previously played in MLB for the Miami Marlins. López made his MLB debut in 2018 and was an All-Star in 2023.

== Early life ==
López was raised in Venezuela. Both his parents were doctors. His mother died in a car crash when he was 11 years old. López graduated high school at age 16, where he became fluent in English, Italian and Portuguese and was then accepted into medical school. Around the same time, he received a contract offer from the Seattle Mariners. He chose to pursue baseball instead of a medical career, to mixed reactions from his family.

== Career ==
=== Seattle Mariners ===
López signed with the Seattle Mariners as an international free agent in July 2012 for $280,000. He made his professional debut in 2013 with the VSL Mariners and spent the whole season there, going 7–1 with a 2.57 ERA in 12 starts. He missed all of 2014 after undergoing Tommy John surgery. He returned in 2015 with the AZL Mariners, going 2–1 with a 3.13 ERA in 37 1/3 innings pitched. He spent 2016 with the Clinton LumberKings, where was compiled a 7–1 record, 2.13 ERA, and 0.91 WHIP in 17 games (13 starts), and he began 2017 with the Modesto Nuts.

=== Miami Marlins ===
On July 20, 2017, the Mariners traded López, along with Brayan Hernandez, Brandon Miller, and Lukas Schiraldi to the Miami Marlins for David Phelps. Miami assigned López to the Jupiter Hammerheads where he finished the season. In 27 games (24 starts) between the two teams, he was 5–11 with a 4.15 ERA and a .271 batting average against. The Marlins added him to their 40-man roster after the 2017 season.

López began 2018 with the Jacksonville Jumbo Shrimp and was promoted to the New Orleans Baby Cakes in early June. He was promoted to the major leagues on June 30, 2018, and he made his MLB debut that day as the starting pitcher at Marlins Park against the New York Mets. He pitched six innings, allowing two runs on six hits while walking one and striking out five, earning the win as Miami defeated the Mets 5–2.

In June 2019, López suffered a mild right shoulder strain that led to a two-month stint on the injured list. Overall that season, he was 5–8 with a 5.09 ERA in 21 starts.

In the pandemic-shortened 2020 season, López was 6–4 with a 3.61 ERA in eleven starts and struck out 59 batters in 57 1/3 innings. In his postseason debut, he allowed both runs in a 2–0 loss to the Atlanta Braves in the NL Wild Card Series.

On July 11, 2021, in a game against Atlanta, López set a major league record by striking out the first nine batters of the game. López struck out Ehire Adrianza, Freddie Freeman, Ozzie Albies, Austin Riley, Orlando Arcia, Dansby Swanson, Guillermo Heredia, Kevan Smith, and Ian Anderson on 35 pitches during the first, second, and third innings. He finished the 2021 season with a 5–5 record, a 3.07 ERA and 115 strikeouts in 102 2/3 innings over 20 starts.

López's salary for the 2022 season was decided via the arbitration process; he sought $3 million but lost his case, receiving $2.45 million. He was named the NL Pitcher of the Month for April. He finished the 2022 season with a 10–10 record, a 3.75 ERA and 174 strikeouts in 180 innings over 32 starts.

On January 13, 2023, López agreed to a one-year, $5.45 million contract with the Marlins, avoiding salary arbitration.

=== Minnesota Twins ===
On January 20, 2023, the Marlins traded López, José Salas, and Byron Chourio to the Minnesota Twins in exchange for infielder Luis Arráez. He debuted with the Twins on Opening Day, a 2–0 win over the Kansas City Royals. On April 21, the Twins and López agreed to a four-year, $73.5 million contract extension, keeping López under contract through the 2027 season. During the season, López was selected for the first time to the MLB All-Star Game. He finished the season with a 11–8 record, 3.66 ERA, and career-high 234 strikeouts in 194 innings over 32 starts. He finished seventh in AL Cy Young Award voting. López was the winning pitcher in Game 1 of the Wild Card Series over the Toronto Blue Jays, breaking the franchise's 18-game losing streak. He followed that up with a scoreless 7-inning performance against the Houston Astros in Game 2 of the American League Division Series.

In 2024, López was 15–10 with a 4.08 ERA in 32 starts and struck out 198 batters in 185 1/3 innings.

On March 27, 2025, López was the Opening Day starting pitcher for the Twins for the third consecutive season. Facing the St. Louis Cardinals at Busch Stadium, he pitched five innings, giving up eight hits and two runs while striking out three as the losing pitcher in a 5–3 loss. On April 2, he got his first win of the season against Chicago White Sox, after pitching seven innings, allowing one run, four hits, and one walk, while striking out five batters in a 6–1 win. On June 5, López was placed on the injured list after suffering a Grade 2 strain of the teres major in his throwing shoulder. He was activated from the injured list on September 5. In 14 total starts for Minnesota on the season, López posted a 5-4 record and 2.74 ERA with 73 strikeouts across 75 2/3 innings pitched. On September 20, López was placed on the injured list due to a right forearm strain, ending his season.

On February 17, 2026, the Twins announced that Lopez had "significant tearing" in the ulnar collateral ligament in his right elbow. On February 26, López underwent a procedure with an internal brace inserted in his right elbow, and was subsequently ruled out for the entire 2026 season.

== International career ==
Lopez started one game for Venezuela in the 2023 World Baseball Classic, striking out six Puerto Rico batters in a 9–6 win. He pitched at LoanDepot Park, his home field with the Marlins, alongside Luis Arráez, who he had been traded for that offseason.

== Pitching style ==
López's throws his fastballs at an average velocity of 92–95 miles per hour (148–153 km/h), maxing out at 97 mph (156 km/h). He throws both a four-seam fastball and sinker. His secondary pitches are a changeup that averages 87 mph (140 km/h) and a curveball that averages 81 mph (130 km/h).

== Personal life ==
López graduated first in his high school class with a grade-point average of 19.8 on a scale of 1 to 20. After he aced a standardized test, he was accepted to medical school in Venezuela at 16 years old. Both of his parents were doctors, but he chose baseball instead, stating, "The body, as you grow older, gets weaker. The mind just gets stronger. Baseball is a one-time opportunity. That was my thought process. I could always go back to school." While in the Seattle Mariners farm system, López became fluent in four languages: Spanish, English, Portuguese (when conversing with Brazilian teammates), and Italian, though he said he's 'rusty'. His sister is a lawyer, and his brother is an engineer. López's father died in 2020 of a heart attack.

Sandy Alcántara said López's Marlins teammates called him "Google" because he could regularly answer their questions.
