= 2023 American League Wild Card Series =

Teams
Team (Wins)		Manager	Season
Minnesota Twins (2)		Rocco Baldelli	87–75 (.537), GA: 9
Toronto Blue Jays (0)		John Schneider	89–73 (.549), GB: 12
- Dates: October 3–4
- Television: United States: ESPN; Canada: Sportsnet
- TV announcers: Michael Kay, Alex Rodriguez, and Alden Gonzalez (ESPN); Dan Shulman, Buck Martinez, and Hazel Mae (Sportsnet)
- Radio: ESPN
- Radio announcers: Dave O'Brien and Kyle Peterson
- Umpires: Andy Fletcher, Adam Hamari, Dan Iassogna (crew chief), Mike Muchlinski, Jeremie Rehak, Mark Wegner

Teams
Team (Wins)		Manager	Season
Texas Rangers (2)		Bruce Bochy	90–72 (.556), GB: 0
Tampa Bay Rays (0)		Kevin Cash	99–63 (.611), GB: 2
- Dates: October 3–4
- Television: ABC
- TV announcers: Sean McDonough, Jessica Mendoza, Tim Kurkjian, and Coley Harvey
- Radio: ESPN
- Radio announcers: Mike Monaco and Todd Frazier
- Umpires: Lance Barksdale (crew chief), Adam Beck, Tripp Gibson, Adrian Johnson, Carlos Torres, Alex Tosi

The 2023 American League Wild Card Series were the two best-of-three playoff series in Major League Baseball’s (MLB) 2023 postseason that determined the participating teams of the 2023 American League Division Series (ALDS). Both Wild Card Series began on October 3, with Game 2s scheduled for October 4. ESPN broadcast both Wild Card Series in the United States together with ESPN Radio while Sportsnet broadcast the Minnesota Twins vs. Toronto Blue Jays series in Canada.

These matchups were:

- (3) Minnesota Twins (AL Central champions) vs. (6) Toronto Blue Jays (third wild card): Twins won the series, 2–0.
- (4) Tampa Bay Rays (first wild card) vs. (5) Texas Rangers (second wild card): Rangers won the series, 2–0.

== Background ==
Under the current playoff structure, there are two Wild Card Series in both the American League (AL) and National League (NL). The lowest-seeded division winner and three wild card teams in each league play in a best-of-three series after the end of the regular season. The winners of each league's wild card rounds advance to face the two best division winners in that league's Division Series.

The Minnesota Twins (87–75) clinched the postseason for the first time since 2020 by winning the AL Central on September 23. Due to being the worst division winner in the American League in terms of record, they were locked into the third seed. The Twins, whose 18-game postseason losing streak is the longest in North American professional sports, were looking for their first postseason game win since 2004 and their first postseason series win since 2002. They hosted to the sixth-seeded Toronto Blue Jays (89–73), who clinched their second straight postseason appearance, and third since 2020, on September 30. The teams split their regular season series match-up, 3–3. Their only previous postseason meeting occurred in the 1991 American League Championship Series, which Minnesota won in five games.

The Tampa Bay Rays (99–63) clinched their fifth straight postseason appearance, extending the franchise record for consecutive postseason, on September 17, via a win against the Baltimore Orioles, who also clinched a berth on this day after the Texas Rangers lost to Cleveland Guardians. As a result of holding the best non-division winning record in the American League, they were locked into the fourth seed. They hosted the fifth-seeded Texas Rangers (90–72), who clinched their first postseason appearance since 2016 on September 30, but they lost their AL West division lead on the last day of the season via a 1–0 shutout loss to the Seattle Mariners and the Houston Astros 8–1 win against the Arizona Diamondbacks. As a result, the Astros won the AL West and clinched a first-round bye by winning the season series 9–4 against the Rangers. Texas won the regular season series against Tampa Bay, 4–2. This is the third postseason match-up between the Rays and Rangers, with the Rangers having won the previous two matchups, the 2010 American League Division Series in five games and the 2011 American League Division Series in four games. The series was also notable for it being just the ninth postseason series to have two brothers facing each other (Rays' Josh Lowe and the Rangers' Nathaniel Lowe). Prior to the start of the series, it was revealed their mother was battling cancer and undergoing chemotherapy.

As the top two seeds, the Baltimore Orioles (101–61) and Houston Astros (90–72) earned a first-round bye and home-field advantage in the ALDS.

== Matchups ==
=== Minnesota Twins vs. Toronto Blue Jays ===
Minnesota won the series, 2–0.

Game	Date	Score	Location	Time	Attendance
1	October 3	Toronto Blue Jays – 1, Minnesota Twins – 3	Target Field	2:40	38,450
2	October 4	Toronto Blue Jays – 0, Minnesota Twins – 2	Target Field	2:51	38,518

=== Tampa Bay Rays vs. Texas Rangers ===
Texas won the series, 2–0.

Game	Date	Score	Location	Time	Attendance
1	October 3	Texas Rangers – 4, Tampa Bay Rays – 0	Tropicana Field	2:41	19,704
2	October 4	Texas Rangers – 7, Tampa Bay Rays – 1	Tropicana Field	2:39	20,198

== Minnesota vs. Toronto ==
This was the second postseason match-up between the Twins and Blue Jays, following the 1991 American League Championship Series, which Minnesota won in five games. Heading into the series, numerous observers commented on how evenly matched the two teams were.

=== Game 1 ===
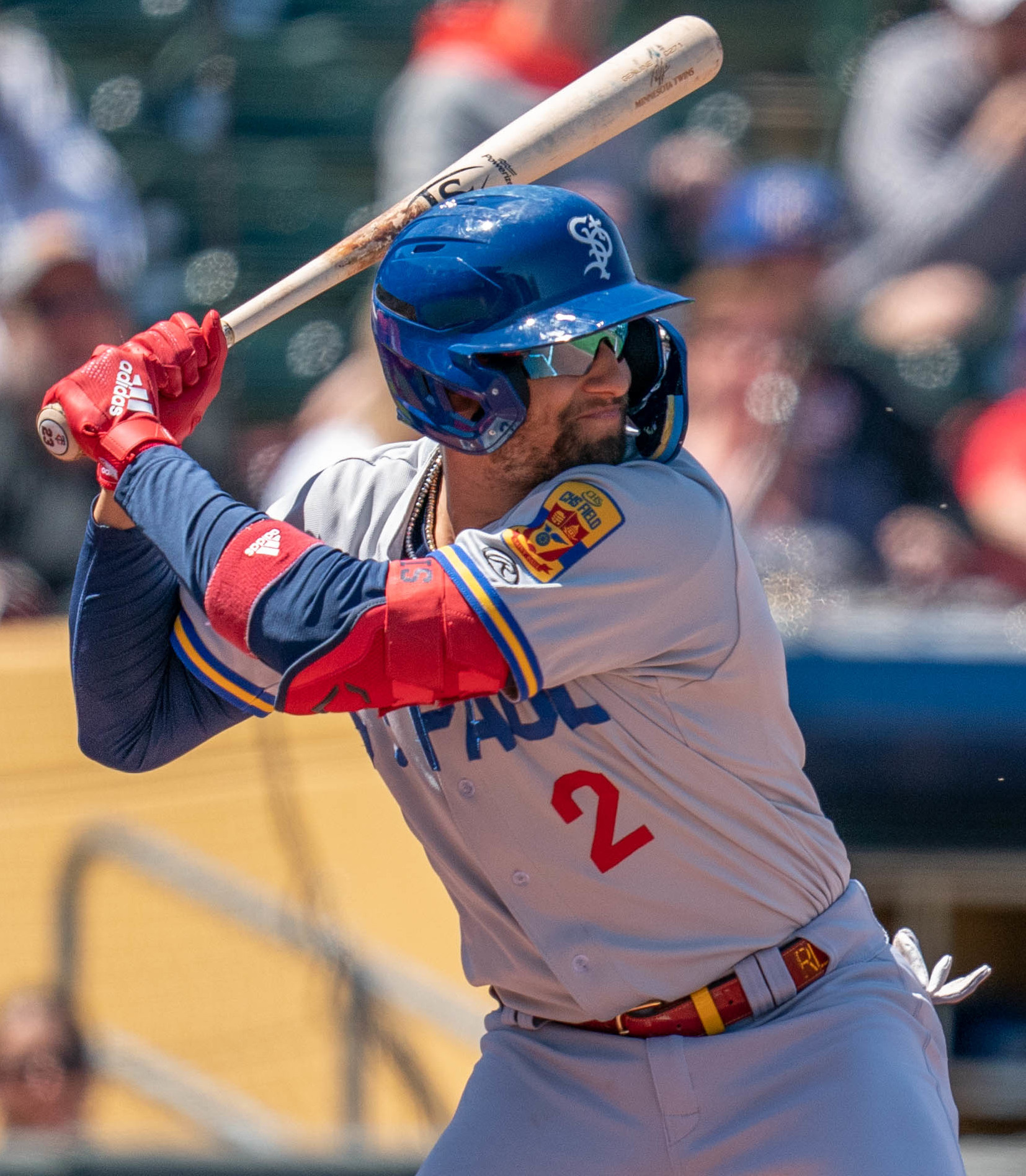
Royce Lewis, pictured here with the St. Paul Saints, hit two home runs and drove in all of the Twins' runs in Game 1.

October 3, 2023 3:40 pm (CDT) at Target Field in Minneapolis, Minnesota 84 °F (29 °C), Overcast
Team	1	2	3	4	5	6	7	8	9	R	H	E
Toronto	0	0	0	0	0	1	0	0	0	1	6	0
Minnesota	2	0	1	0	0	0	0	0	X	3	5	1
WP: Pablo López (1–0) LP: Kevin Gausman (0–1) Sv: Jhoan Durán (1); Home runs: TOR: None; MIN: Royce Lewis 2 (2); Attendance: 38,450; Boxscore

Kevin Gausman took the mound for the Blue Jays opposite Pablo López for the Twins, who were looking to end the longest playoff losing streak in North American sports history. Royce Lewis provided all of the offense the Twins would need, hitting two home runs in his first two playoff at-bats to put Minnesota up 3–0. Michael A. Taylor and Carlos Correa made strong defensive plays to keep the Blue Jays off of the board until the top of the sixth, when Toronto plated a run on a Kevin Kiermaier single. The Twins bullpen shut down the scoring from there with 3 1/3 scoreless innings to earn the Twins' first playoff victory since Game 1 of the 2004 ALDS. Their previous 18-game playoff losing streak was the longest in MLB history.

=== Game 2 ===
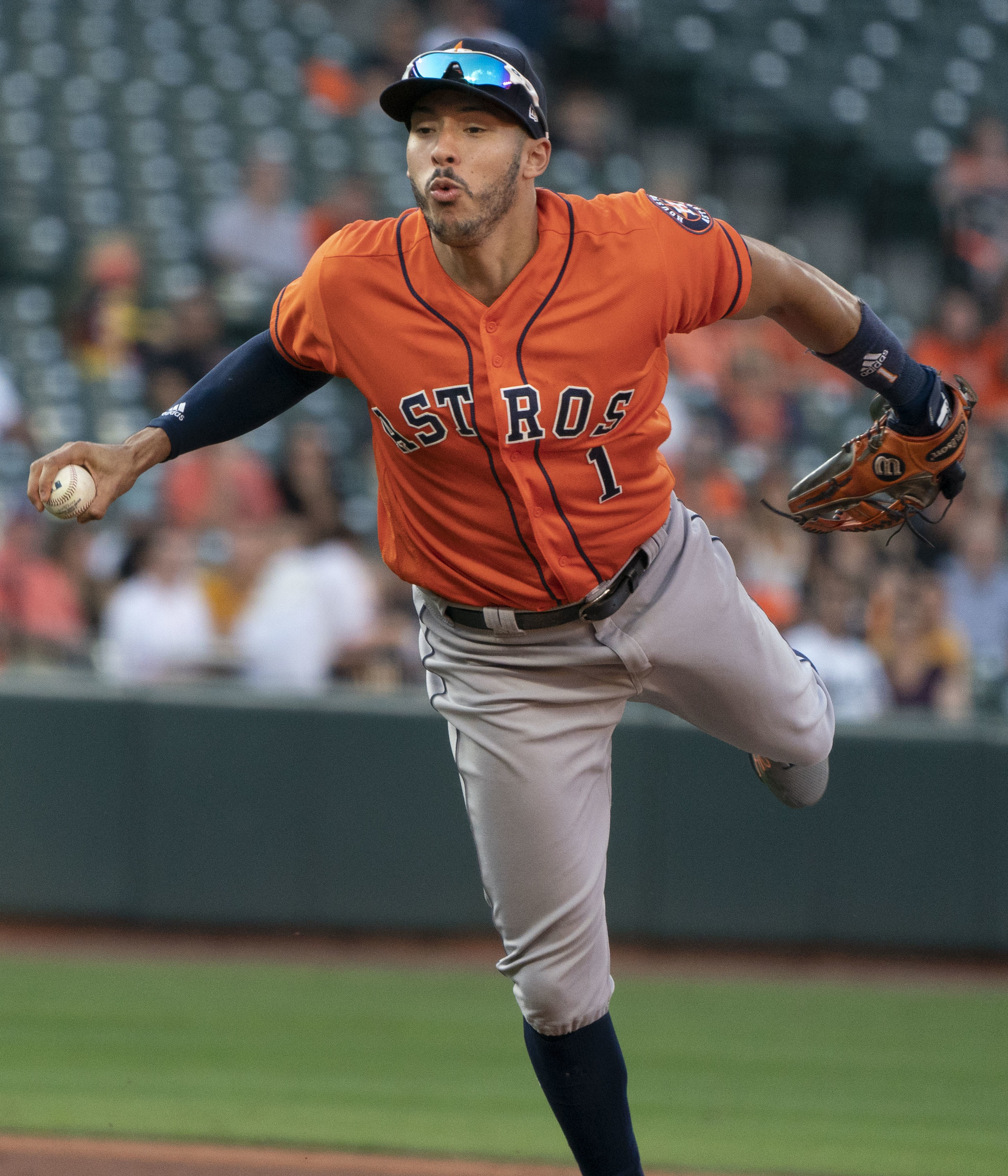
Carlos Correa, pictured here with the Houston Astros, drove in the go-ahead run in Game 2.

October 4, 2023 3:40 pm (CDT) at Target Field in Minneapolis, Minnesota 64 °F (18 °C), Cloudy
Team	1	2	3	4	5	6	7	8	9	R	H	E
Toronto	0	0	0	0	0	0	0	0	0	0	9	1
Minnesota	0	0	0	2	0	0	0	0	0	2	7	0
WP: Sonny Gray (1–0) LP: José Berríos (0–1) Sv: Jhoan Durán (2); Attendance: 38,518; Boxscore

The Blue Jays, looking to stave off elimination, started former Twin José Berríos, while the Twins, in pursuit of their first playoff series win since 2002, started Sonny Gray. Both pitchers allowed no runs for the first three innings of the game. After giving up a leadoff walk in the fourth inning, Berríos was pulled with 47 pitches thrown in favor of Yusei Kikuchi. Kikuchi, normally a starter, proceeded to load the bases with no outs. Carlos Correa drove in a run with a single. Willi Castro subsequently hit into a double play but Max Kepler was able to score Minnesota's second run of the game. The Blue Jays put two runners in scoring position in the fifth inning but Vladimir Guerrero Jr. was picked off at second base to end the inning. In the sixth, Toronto loaded the bases with one out but failed to score as Matt Chapman hit into a 6–4–3 double play. Three innings later, Jhoan Durán would pitch around a one-out single to strike out the side and pickup his second save in as many days. With the victory, the Twins won their first postseason series since 2002, and with the loss, the Blue Jays fell to 0–6 in postseason games since 2020.

=== Composite line score ===
2023 ALWC (2–0): Minnesota Twins beat Toronto Blue Jays

Team	1	2	3	4	5	6	7	8	9	R	H	E
Toronto Blue Jays	0	0	0	0	0	1	0	0	0	1	15	1
Minnesota Twins	2	0	1	2	0	2	0	0	0	5	12	1
Total attendance: 76,968 Average attendance: 38,484

== Tampa Bay vs. Texas ==
This was the third postseason match-up between the Rays and Rangers, with the Rangers having won the previous two matchups: the 2010 American League Division Series in five games, and the 2011 American League Division Series in four games.

=== Game 1 ===
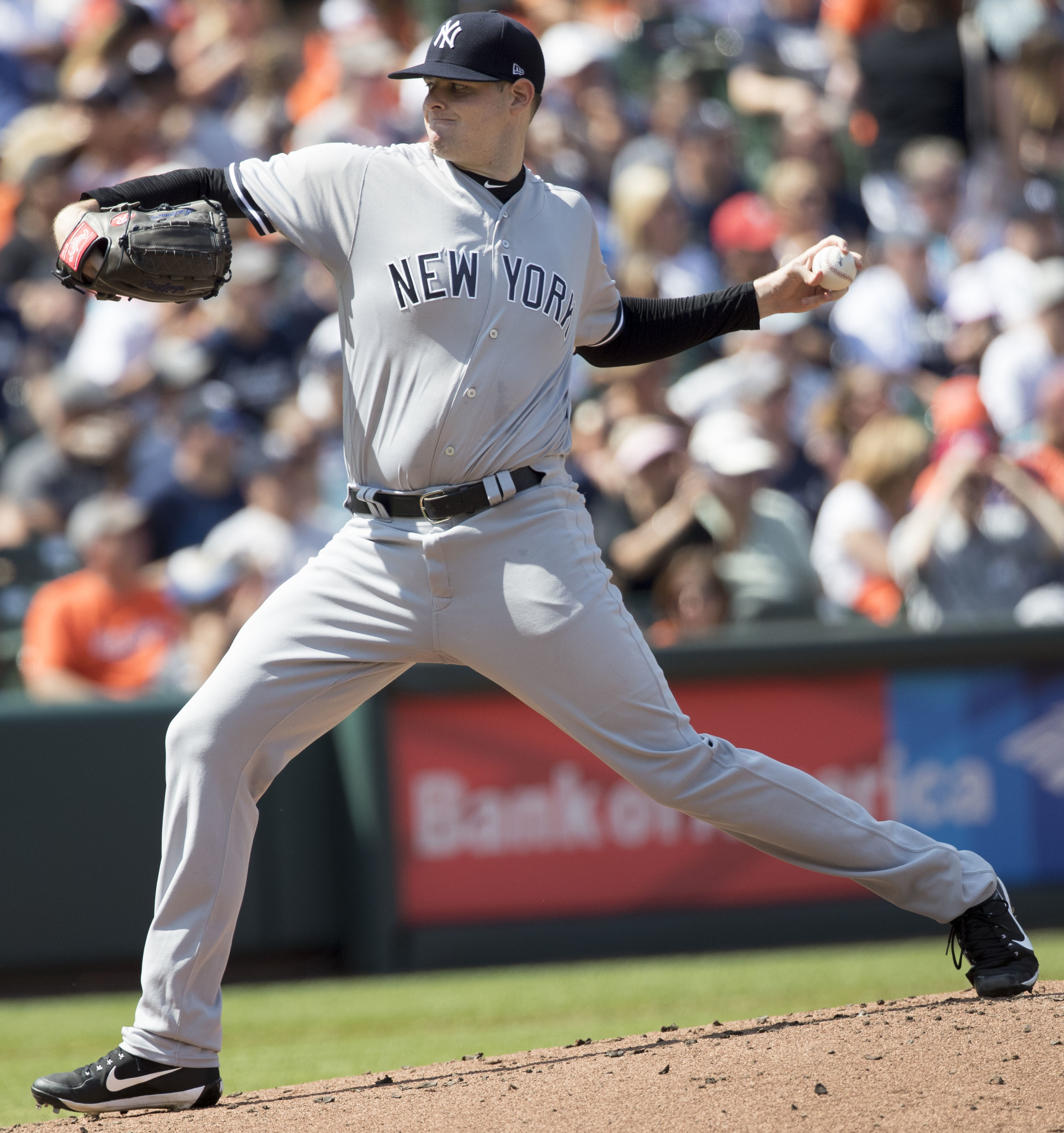
Jordan Montgomery, pictured here with the New York Yankees, got the win in Game 1.

October 3, 2023 3:07 pm (EDT) at Tropicana Field in St. Petersburg, Florida 72 °F (22 °C), Dome
Team	1	2	3	4	5	6	7	8	9	R	H	E
Texas	0	1	0	0	1	2	0	0	0	4	9	1
Tampa Bay	0	0	0	0	0	0	0	0	0	0	6	4
WP: Jordan Montgomery (1–0) LP: Tyler Glasnow (0–1); Attendance: 19,704; Boxscore

Jordan Montgomery scattered six hits and struck out five over seven shutout innings, helping the Texas Rangers beat the Tampa Bay Rays, 4–0. Tyler Glasnow battled through five innings, giving up four runs, one earned, and striking out eight while walking five. The Rays committed four errors, setting a single-game playoff franchise record and the most in a postseason game since the New York Yankees committed four errors in Game 4 of the 2019 ALCS. The 19,704 in attendance for the afternoon match-up was the lowest attended postseason game (non-COVID-19 year) since Game 7 of the infamous 1919 World Series. The Rangers snapped a six-game postseason losing streak that began with the loss against the Blue Jays in Game 3 of the 2015 ALDS.

=== Game 2 ===
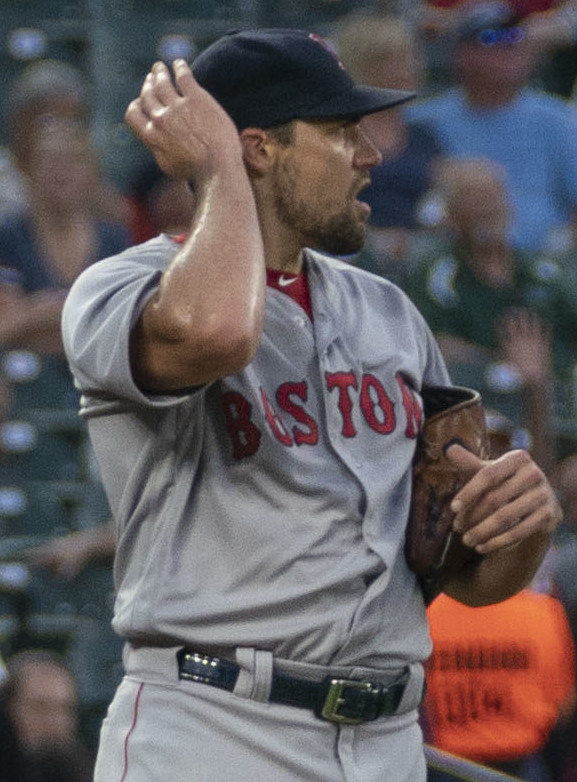
Nathan Eovaldi, pictured here with the Boston Red Sox, got the win in Game 2.

October 4, 2023 3:08 pm (EDT) at Tropicana Field in St. Petersburg, Florida 72 °F (22 °C), Dome
Team	1	2	3	4	5	6	7	8	9	R	H	E
Texas	0	0	0	4	1	2	0	0	0	7	12	1
Tampa Bay	0	0	0	0	0	0	1	0	0	1	8	1
WP: Nathan Eovaldi (1–0) LP: Zach Eflin (0–1); Home runs: TEX: Adolis García (1), Evan Carter (1); TB: None; Attendance: 20,198; Boxscore

Nathan Eovaldi scattered six hits and struck out eight over 6 2/3 innings, leading the Rangers to a 7–1 victory and their first playoff series win since the 2011 ALCS. Zach Eflin battled through five innings, giving up five runs, four earned, and striking out three while walking two. Before scratching across a single run in the bottom of the seventh, the Rays had gone 34 consecutive innings without scoring in the playoffs, a scoreless streak that dated back to the sixth inning of Game 1 of the 2022 AL Wild Card Series against the Cleveland Guardians. Tampa Bay has now lost seven postseason games in a row dating back to the 2021 ALDS against the Boston Red Sox. Additionally, with the Minnesota Twins' 18-game playoff losing streak ending on the previous night, the Rays are now tied with the Blue Jays with the longest active playoff losing streak, at seven. This active playoff losing streak would be surpassed by the Baltimore Orioles (eight games) following getting swept by the Rangers in the next round.

=== Composite line score ===
2023 ALWC (2–0): Texas Rangers beat Tampa Bay Rays

Team	1	2	3	4	5	6	7	8	9	R	H	E
Texas Rangers	0	1	0	4	2	4	0	0	0	11	21	2
Tampa Bay Rays	0	0	0	0	0	0	1	0	0	1	14	5
Total attendance: 39,902 Average attendance: 19,951

== See also ==
- 2023 National League Wild Card Series
