= 2023 American League Division Series =

Baseball competition

Teams
| Team (Wins) | | Manager | Season |
| Texas Rangers (3) | | Bruce Bochy | 90–72 (.556), GB: 0 |
| Baltimore Orioles (0) | | Brandon Hyde | 101–61 (.623), GA: 2 |
- Dates: October 7–10
- Television: FS1 (Games 1–2); Fox (Game 3)
- TV announcers: Joe Davis, John Smoltz, and Ken Rosenthal
- Radio: ESPN
- Radio announcers: Karl Ravech and Tim Kurkjian
- Umpires: Lance Barrett, Cory Blaser, Nic Lentz, John Libka, Alfonso Márquez (crew chief), Quinn Wolcott

Teams
| Team (Wins) | | Manager | Season |
| Houston Astros (3) | | Dusty Baker | 90–72 (.556), GA: 0 |
| Minnesota Twins (1) | | Rocco Baldelli | 87–75 (.537), GA: 9 |
- Dates: October 7–11
- Television: FS1 (Games 1–2, 4); Fox (Game 3)
- TV announcers: Adam Amin, A. J. Pierzynski, Adam Wainwright, and Tom Verducci
- Radio: ESPN
- Radio announcers: Dave O'Brien (Games 1–3), Mike Couzens (Game 4), and Eduardo Pérez
- Umpires: Brian Knight, Bill Miller (crew chief), Roberto Ortiz, D.J. Reyburn, John Tumpane, Jansen Visconti
- ALWC: Minnesota Twins over Toronto Blue Jays (2–0); Texas Rangers over Tampa Bay Rays (2–0)

The 2023 American League Division Series (ALDS) were the two best-of-five playoff series in Major League Baseball’s (MLB) 2023 postseason to determine the participating teams of the 2023 American League Championship Series (ALCS). These matchups were:

- (1) Baltimore Orioles (AL East champions) vs. (5) Texas Rangers (Wild Card Series winner): Rangers won the series, 3–0.
- (2) Houston Astros (AL West champions) vs. (3) Minnesota Twins (Wild Card Series winner): Astros won the series, 3–1.

The Rangers would go on to defeat their AL West rival Astros in seven games in the ALCS, and would go on to defeat the Arizona Diamondbacks in the World Series, 4–1.

== Background ==
The top two division winners (first two seeds) are determined by regular season winning percentages. The final two teams are the winners of the American League Wild Card Series, played between the league's third through sixth-seeded teams.

The Baltimore Orioles (101–61) clinched their first postseason berth since 2016 on September 17, the American League East division title for the first time since 2014, a first-round bye, and best record in AL on September 28 with a 100th win against the Boston Red Sox in a 2–0 shutout, giving them home-field advantage throughout the AL playoff. They played the Texas Rangers (90–72), who qualified for the postseason on September 30 and as the fifth seed wild card entrant the next day, and swept the Tampa Bay Rays in the Wild Card Series for their first division series appearance since 2016. The Orioles and Rangers split the regular season series, 3–3. The match-up was the two teams' second postseason meeting after the 2012 American League Wild Card Game, which Baltimore won.

The Houston Astros (90–72) clinched their seventh straight playoff berth on September 30, then clinched their third consecutive American League West division title, their sixth in seven seasons since 2017, and a first-round bye as the second seed the next day with a 8–1 win against the Arizona Diamondbacks and the Seattle Mariners 1–0 shutout win over the Texas Rangers by winning the season series against the Rangers 9–4. Houston is looking to become the first repeat champions since the 2000 New York Yankees. They played against the Minnesota Twins (87–75), who clinched the American League Central on September 23, swept the Toronto Blue Jays in the Wild Card Series for their first postseason game win since 2004 and their first postseason series win since 2002, and made their first division series appearance since 2019. Houston went 2–4 against Minnesota in the regular season. This was the second postseason match-up between Houston and Minnesota, following the 2020 American League Wild Card Series, which was won by Houston in two games. In addition, the Astros faced their former teammate and shortstop Carlos Correa in the postseason for the first time.

== Matchups ==
=== Baltimore Orioles vs. Texas Rangers ===
Texas won the series, 3–0.

| Game | Date | Score | Location | Time | Attendance |
|---|---|---|---|---|---|
| 1 | October 7 | Texas Rangers – 3, Baltimore Orioles – 2 | Oriole Park at Camden Yards | 3:09 (1:12 delay) | 46,450 |
| 2 | October 8 | Texas Rangers – 11, Baltimore Orioles – 8 | Oriole Park at Camden Yards | 3:45 | 46,475 |
| 3 | October 10 | Baltimore Orioles – 1, Texas Rangers – 7 | Globe Life Field | 2:48 | 40,861 |

=== Houston Astros vs. Minnesota Twins ===
Houston won the series, 3–1.

| Game | Date | Score | Location | Time | Attendance |
|---|---|---|---|---|---|
| 1 | October 7 | Minnesota Twins – 4, Houston Astros – 6 | Minute Maid Park | 2:58 | 43,024 |
| 2 | October 8 | Minnesota Twins – 6, Houston Astros – 2 | Minute Maid Park | 3:09 | 43,017 |
| 3 | October 10 | Houston Astros – 9, Minnesota Twins – 1 | Target Field | 3:10 | 41,017 |
| 4 | October 11 | Houston Astros – 3, Minnesota Twins – 2 | Target Field | 2:38 | 40,977 |

== Baltimore vs. Texas ==
This was the second postseason meeting between Baltimore and Texas, following their 2012 American League Wild Card Game match-up, which Baltimore won.

=== Game 1 ===
October 7, 2023 2:15 pm (EDT) at Oriole Park at Camden Yards in Baltimore, Maryland 63 °F (17 °C), Mostly sunny
| Team | 1 | 2 | 3 | 4 | 5 | 6 | 7 | 8 | 9 | R | H | E |
|---|---|---|---|---|---|---|---|---|---|---|---|---|
| Texas | 0 | 0 | 0 | 2 | 0 | 1 | 0 | 0 | 0 | 3 | 8 | 0 |
| Baltimore | 0 | 0 | 0 | 1 | 0 | 1 | 0 | 0 | 0 | 2 | 5 | 0 |
WP: Dane Dunning (1–0) LP: Kyle Bradish (0–1) Sv: José Leclerc (1); Home runs: TEX: Josh Jung (1); BAL: Anthony Santander (1); Attendance: 46,450; Boxscore

The game was delayed by 73 minutes due to rain. This was the first playoff game at Camden Yards since the 2014 ALCS. In the top of the fourth, Evan Carter doubled to score Adolis Garcia to give the Rangers a 1–0 lead. Jonah Heim then singled to score Carter to extend the lead to 2–0. In the bottom of the inning, Ryan Mountcastle doubled to score Anthony Santander, cutting the lead to 2–1. In the fifth, Austin Hays grounds into a double play off Dane Dunning to end the inning. In the top of the sixth, Josh Jung hit a solo home run to extend the Rangers lead at 3–1. In the bottom of the inning, Anthony Santander hit a solo home run to narrow the Rangers lead to 3–2. This was as close as the Orioles could get in dropping the first game of the series.

=== Game 2 ===
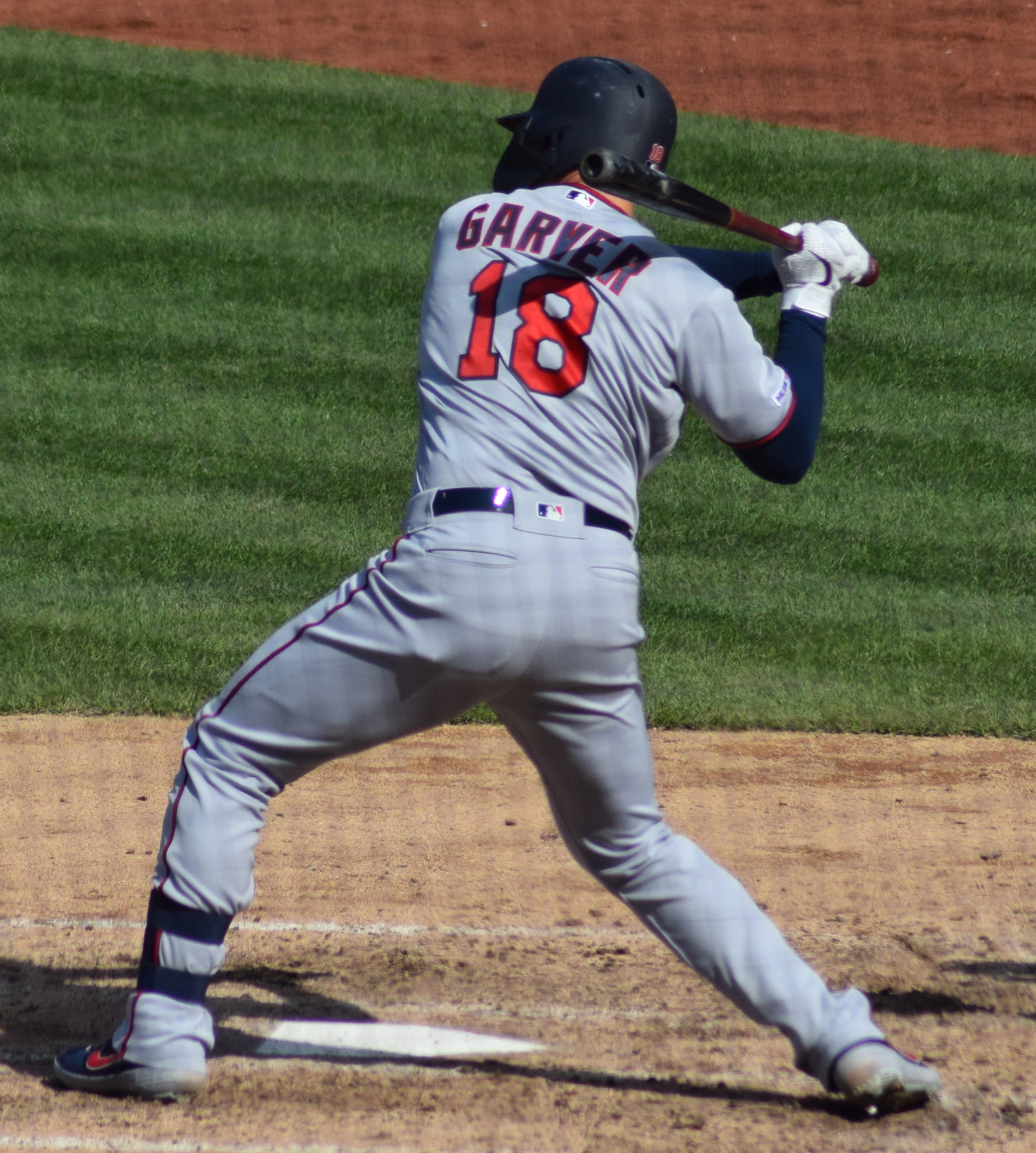
Mitch Garver, pictured here with the Minnesota Twins, drives in five runs, including a grand slam in Game 2.

October 8, 2023 4:07 pm (EDT) at Oriole Park at Camden Yards in Baltimore, Maryland 60 °F (16 °C), Cloudy
| Team | 1 | 2 | 3 | 4 | 5 | 6 | 7 | 8 | 9 | R | H | E |
|---|---|---|---|---|---|---|---|---|---|---|---|---|
| Texas | 0 | 5 | 4 | 0 | 1 | 0 | 0 | 0 | 1 | 11 | 11 | 1 |
| Baltimore | 2 | 0 | 0 | 2 | 1 | 0 | 0 | 0 | 3 | 8 | 14 | 0 |
WP: Cody Bradford (1–0) LP: Grayson Rodriguez (0–1); Home runs: TEX: Mitch Garver (1); BAL: Gunnar Henderson (1), Aaron Hicks (1); Attendance: 46,475; Boxscore

Baltimore scored first in their bottom half of the first inning as Aaron Hicks singled to score Ryan Mountcastle and Gunnar Henderson. In the second, the Rangers score five runs with a two-run double from Leody Taveras, an RBI single from Mitch Garver, an RBI single from Adolis García, and an RBI single from Jonah Heim, to take a 5–2 lead. In the top of the third, Garver hit a grand slam, giving the Rangers a 9–2 lead. In the fourth, Jorge Mateo singled to score Jordan Westburg for the Orioles, cutting the lead to 9–3. Later, Ryan Mountcastle sacrifice fly plated Mateo, making it 9–4. In the top of the fifth inning, Mitch Garver ground into a double play, scoring Leody Taveras, and extending the lead to 10–4. In the bottom half, Gunnar Henderson homered off Jordan Montgomery to make it 10–5. In the ninth inning, Marcus Semien grounded out to score Josh Jung to extend the lead to 11–5. In the bottom of the same inning, Aaron Hicks hit a three-run home run, to make the final score 11–8 and giving the Rangers a chance for the sweep Tuesday night.

=== Game 3 ===
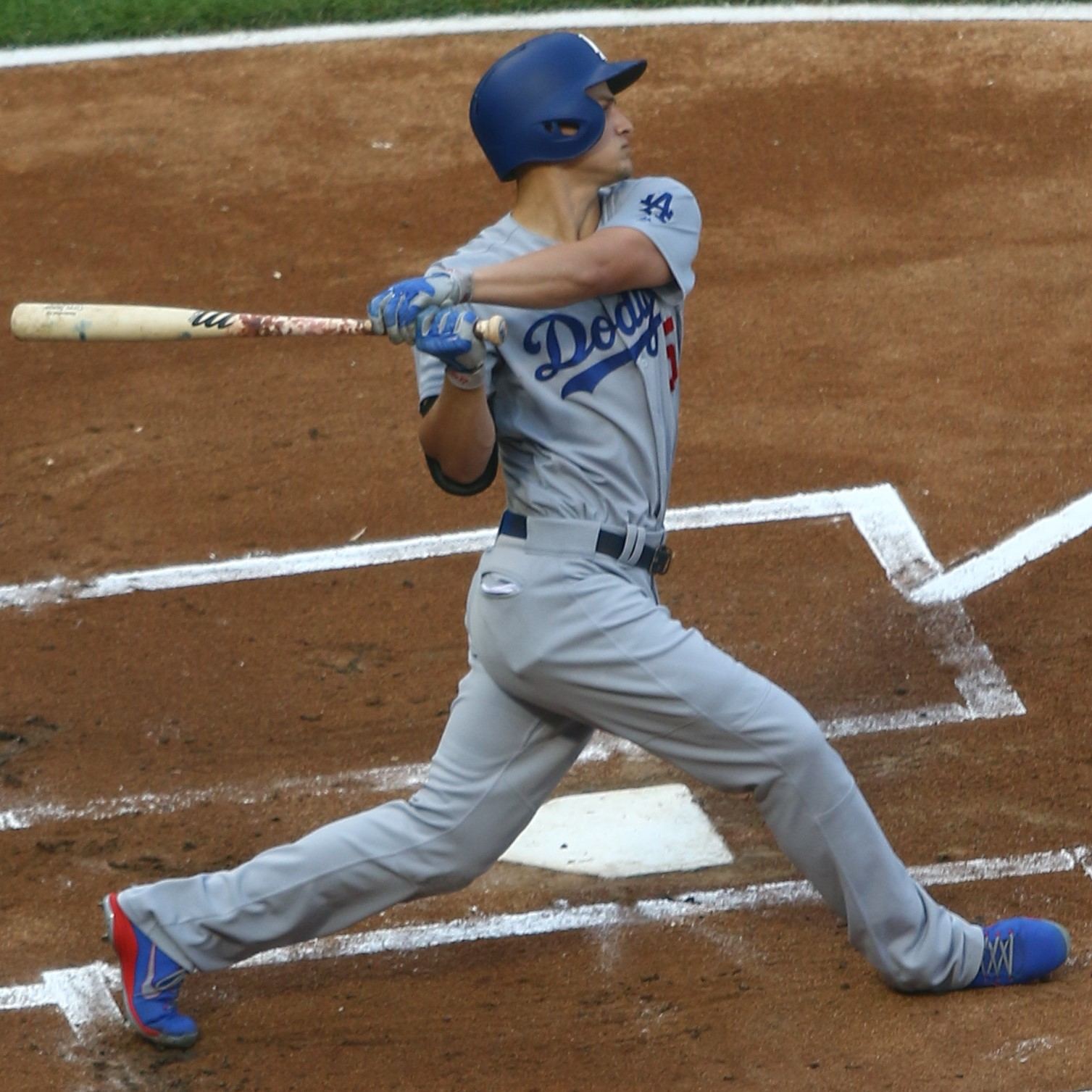
Corey Seager, pictured here with the Los Angeles Dodgers, hit a first-inning home run in Game 3.

October 10, 2023 8:03 pm (EDT) at Globe Life Field in Arlington, Texas 74 °F (23 °C), Roof Closed
| Team | 1 | 2 | 3 | 4 | 5 | 6 | 7 | 8 | 9 | R | H | E |
|---|---|---|---|---|---|---|---|---|---|---|---|---|
| Baltimore | 0 | 0 | 0 | 0 | 1 | 0 | 0 | 0 | 0 | 1 | 6 | 0 |
| Texas | 1 | 5 | 0 | 0 | 0 | 1 | 0 | 0 | X | 7 | 11 | 0 |
WP: Nathan Eovaldi (1–0) LP: Dean Kremer (0–1); Home runs: BAL: None; TEX: Corey Seager (1), Adolis García (1), Nathaniel Lowe (1); Attendance: 40,861; Boxscore

Game 3 featured Dean Kremer toeing the rubber for the Orioles and Nathan Eovaldi for the Rangers. The Rangers broke open the scoring in the bottom of the first when Corey Seager homered to stake the Rangers to a 1–0 lead. In the second inning, the Rangers blew the game open by scoring five runs and lengthening the lead to 6–0. All runs were scored with two outs as Mitch Garver's two-run RBI double scored Marcus Semien and Seager. Then Adolis García crushed a three-run home run to chase Kremer. In the top of the fifth, the Orioles got on the scoreboard when Gunnar Henderson singled to right to score Jordan Westburg and cut the Rangers lead to 6–1. Nathaniel Lowe made it 7–1 with a home run in the bottom of the sixth. José Leclerc, who came on in the top of the eighth inning to get out of a bases-loaded jam, finished the game with a perfect ninth inning. The Rangers swept the Orioles and advanced to their first League Championship Series since 2011.

=== Composite line score ===
2023 ALDS (3–0): Texas Rangers beat Baltimore Orioles

| Team | 1 | 2 | 3 | 4 | 5 | 6 | 7 | 8 | 9 | R | H | E |
|---|---|---|---|---|---|---|---|---|---|---|---|---|
| Texas Rangers | 1 | 10 | 4 | 2 | 1 | 2 | 0 | 0 | 1 | 21 | 30 | 1 |
| Baltimore Orioles | 2 | 0 | 0 | 3 | 2 | 1 | 0 | 0 | 3 | 11 | 25 | 0 |
Total attendance: 133,786 Average attendance: 44,595

== Houston vs. Minnesota ==
This was the second postseason meeting between Houston and Minnesota, following the 2020 American League Wild Card Series matchup, which Houston won in a two-game sweep.

=== Game 1 ===
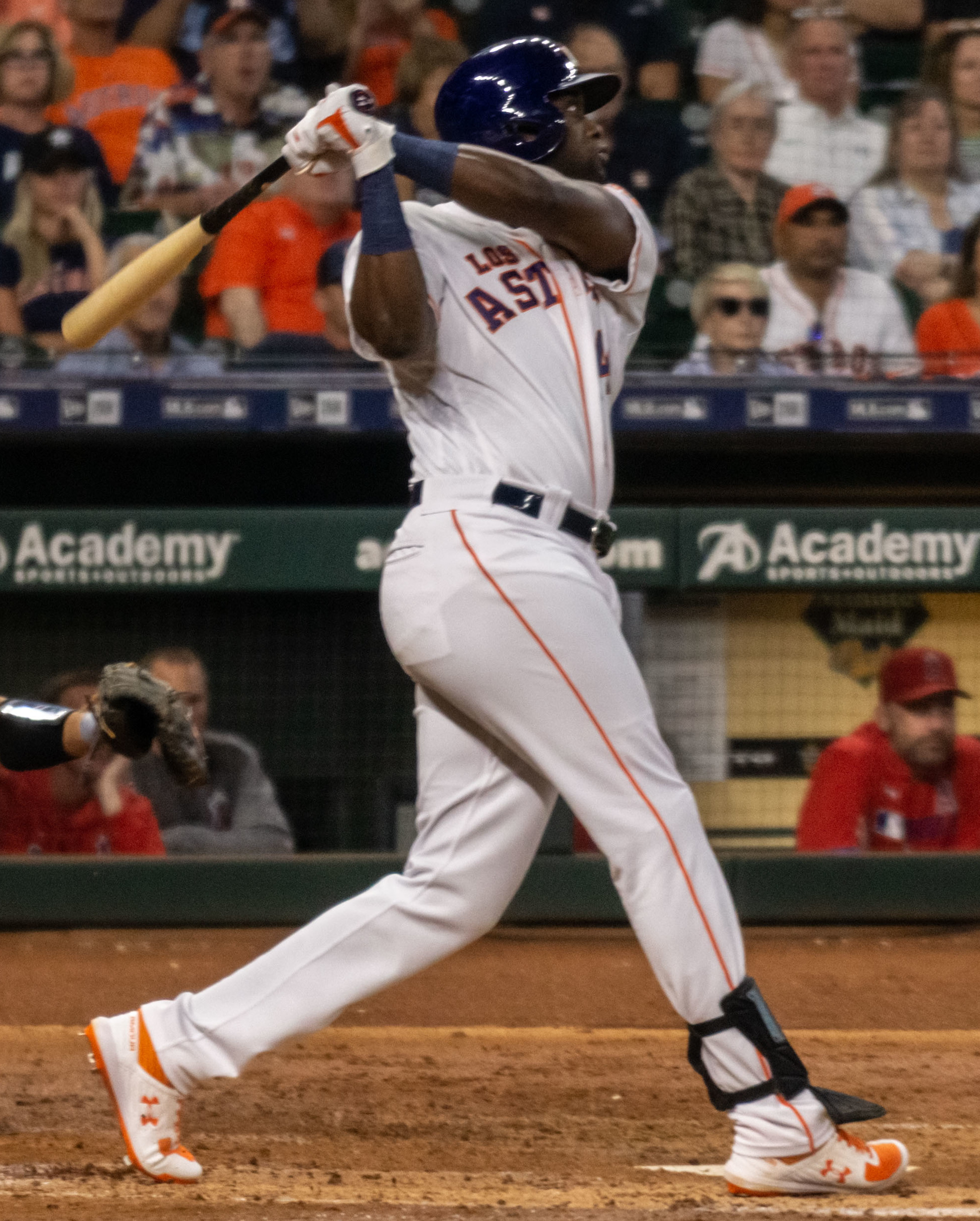
Yordan Alvarez hit two home runs in Game 1.

October 7, 2023 3:45 pm (CDT) at Minute Maid Park in Houston, Texas 73 °F (23 °C), Roof Closed
| Team | 1 | 2 | 3 | 4 | 5 | 6 | 7 | 8 | 9 | R | H | E |
|---|---|---|---|---|---|---|---|---|---|---|---|---|
| Minnesota | 0 | 0 | 0 | 0 | 0 | 0 | 4 | 0 | 0 | 4 | 9 | 0 |
| Houston | 1 | 0 | 2 | 0 | 2 | 0 | 1 | 0 | X | 6 | 9 | 0 |
WP: Justin Verlander (1–0) LP: Bailey Ober (0–1) Sv: Ryan Pressly (1); Home runs: MIN: Jorge Polanco (1), Royce Lewis (1); HOU: Jose Altuve (1), Yordan Alvarez 2 (2); Attendance: 43,024; Boxscore

Game 1 provided a unique pitching matchup with Bailey Ober making his first career postseason start for the Twins, opposite of Justin Verlander making his 35th career postseason start, tied for second-most all time. In the bottom of the first inning, Jose Altuve homered off Ober on the first pitch to give the Astros a 1–0 lead, his Major League record eighth career leadoff home run in the postseason and 24th overall. In the third inning, Yordan Alvarez hit a two-run home run off Ober to extend the Astros' lead to 3–0. In the fifth, José Abreu singled to score Alex Bregman to extend the Astros' lead to 4–0. Chas McCormick also singled to score Yordan Alvarez to extend the Astros lead to 5–0. Verlander threw six shutout innings to post the sixth scoreless start of his postseason career, tying Madison Bumgarner and Tom Glavine for the most all-time. In the top of the seventh, Jorge Polanco hit a three-run home run off Hector Neris, followed shortly by a solo shot by Royce Lewis to narrow the Twins deficit to 5–4. Later, in the bottom of the inning, Alvarez hit his second home run of the game off of Caleb Thielbar to extend the Astros lead to 6–4. Bryan Abreu and Ryan Pressly combined for 2 1/3 scoreless innings to end the game and give the Astros their 12th straight ALDS win at home.

=== Game 2 ===
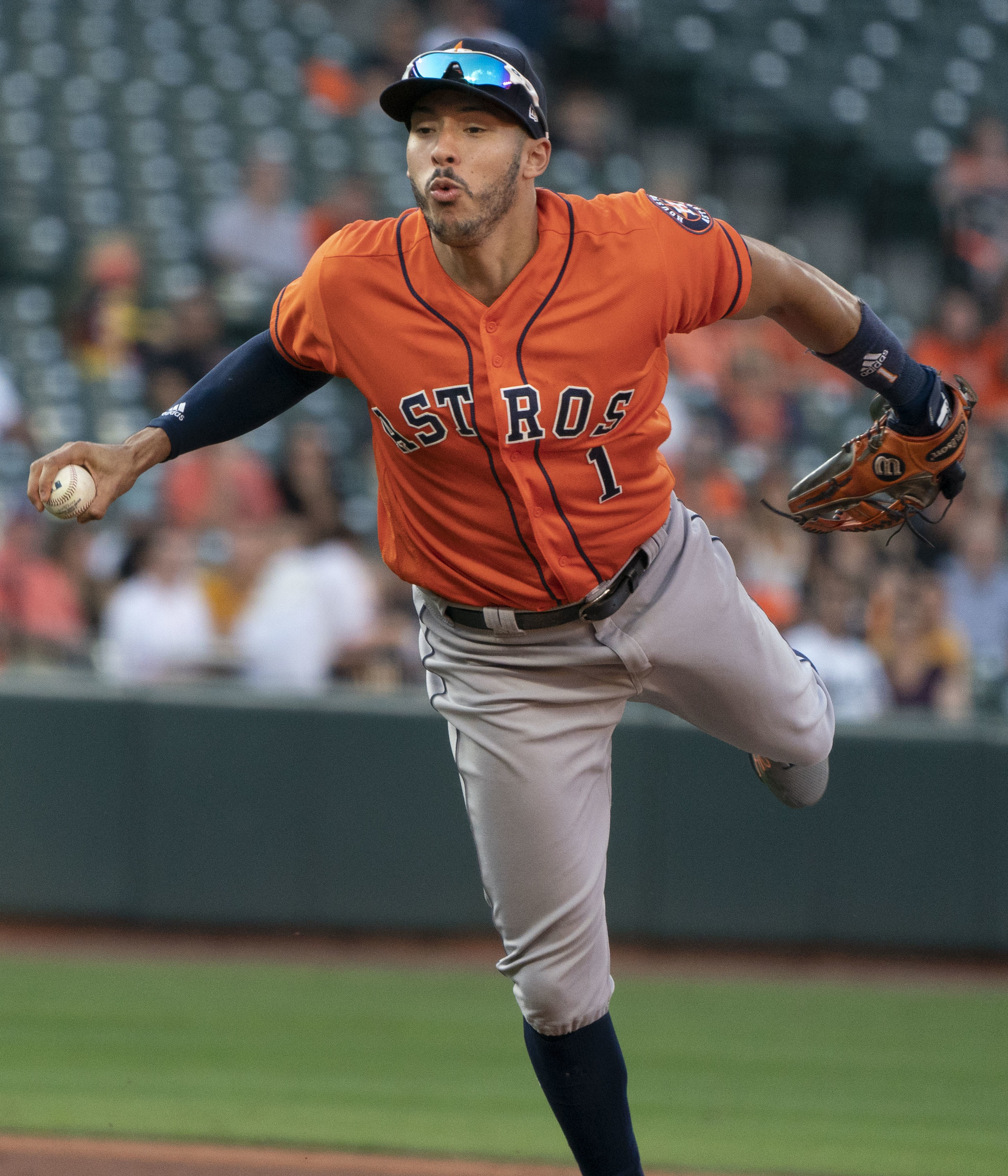
Carlos Correa, pictured with the Houston Astros, drives in three runs, including a two-run single in Game 2.

October 8, 2023 7:03 pm (CDT) at Minute Maid Park in Houston, Texas 73 °F (23 °C), Partly Cloudy
| Team | 1 | 2 | 3 | 4 | 5 | 6 | 7 | 8 | 9 | R | H | E |
|---|---|---|---|---|---|---|---|---|---|---|---|---|
| Minnesota | 1 | 2 | 0 | 0 | 2 | 0 | 1 | 0 | 0 | 6 | 10 | 0 |
| Houston | 0 | 0 | 0 | 0 | 0 | 0 | 0 | 2 | 0 | 2 | 7 | 0 |
WP: Pablo López (1–0) LP: Framber Valdez (0–1); Home runs: MIN: Kyle Farmer (1); HOU: Yordan Alvarez (3); Attendance: 43,017; Boxscore

In the top of the first inning, Carlos Correa doubled, scoring Jorge Polanco to give the Twins the first run of the game. In the top of the second, Kyle Farmer hit a two-run homer off Framber Valdez, extending the lead to 3–0. Correa plated two more runs in the fifth with a single, allowing Michael A. Taylor and Donovan Solano to score, extending the lead to 5–0. In the seventh, Edouard Julien singled to drive in Royce Lewis to give the Twins a 6–0 cushion. In the bottom of the eighth inning, Yordan Alvarez hit his third home run of the series off Brock Stewart to give the Astros their only runs of the game. Jhoan Durán closed out the victory for the Twins for their first victory in an ALDS game since Game 1 of the 2004 American League Division Series. The Astros saw their 12-game home winning streak in the ALDS snapped as this was also their first loss in a Game 2 of the LDS since 2015. This loss also started a nine game home postseason losing streak for the Astros, a streak they are currently still in.

=== Game 3 ===
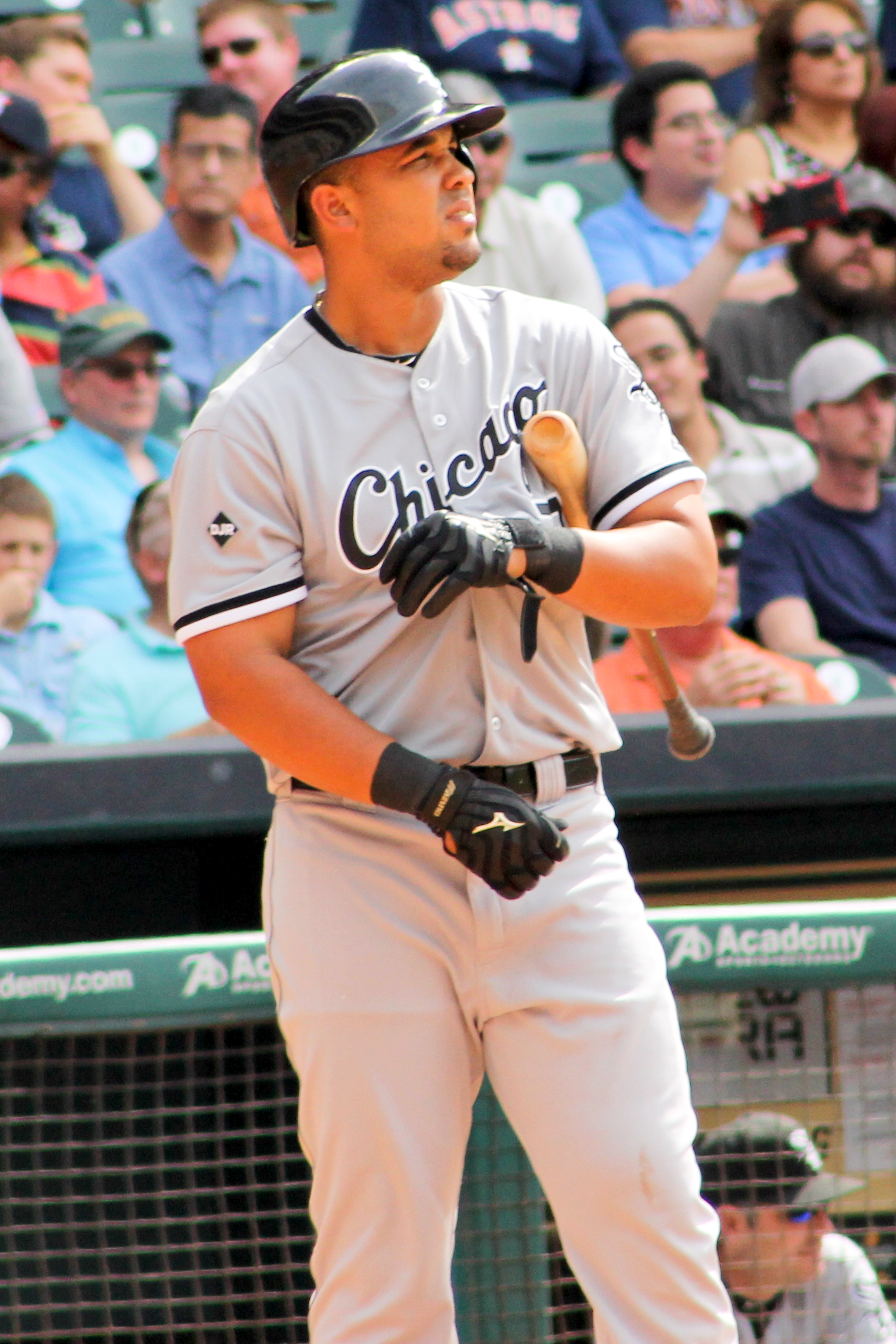
José Abreu, pictured with the Chicago White Sox, hit two home runs in Game 3.

October 10, 2023 3:07 pm (CDT) at Target Field in Minneapolis, Minnesota 54 °F (12 °C), Sunny
| Team | 1 | 2 | 3 | 4 | 5 | 6 | 7 | 8 | 9 | R | H | E |
|---|---|---|---|---|---|---|---|---|---|---|---|---|
| Houston | 4 | 0 | 0 | 0 | 1 | 1 | 0 | 0 | 3 | 9 | 14 | 0 |
| Minnesota | 0 | 0 | 0 | 0 | 0 | 1 | 0 | 0 | 0 | 1 | 3 | 1 |
WP: Cristian Javier (1–0) LP: Sonny Gray (0–1); Home runs: HOU: José Abreu 2 (2), Alex Bregman (1), Yordan Alvarez (4); MIN: None; Attendance: 41,017; Boxscore

Sonny Gray took the mound for the Twins while the Astros countered with Cristian Javier. The Astros struck early off Gray, putting up four runs in the top of the first, punctuated by a José Abreu three-run homer. Alex Bregman added to the lead in the fifth inning with a solo shot, marking the first time since September 24, 2021 that Gray had given up multiple home runs in a game. After the next two batters reached base, he was taken out of the game, having given up four earned runs with six strikeouts in four innings of work. Javier threw five scoreless innings, striking out nine and walking five, marking his third straight scoreless postseason start. Bregman struck again in the sixth with an RBI single, but the Twins answered back in the bottom of the inning, with a Willi Castro RBI single off Hunter Brown to score Carlos Correa. Jeremy Peña made a crucial diving stop to turn an inning-ending double play and keep the game at 6–1. The Astros closed the scoring in the ninth inning with home runs by Yordan Alvarez (his fourth of the series) and Abreu, his second of the game, capping a 9–1 victory and putting the Astros one game away from their seventh straight ALCS.

Alvarez was 6-for-12 with six RBI and 20 total bases in the first three LDS games. Per OptaSTATs, Alvarez joined Reggie Jackson as the only players in history to hit at least four home runs and six extra-base hits within a three-game span of a postseason.

=== Game 4 ===
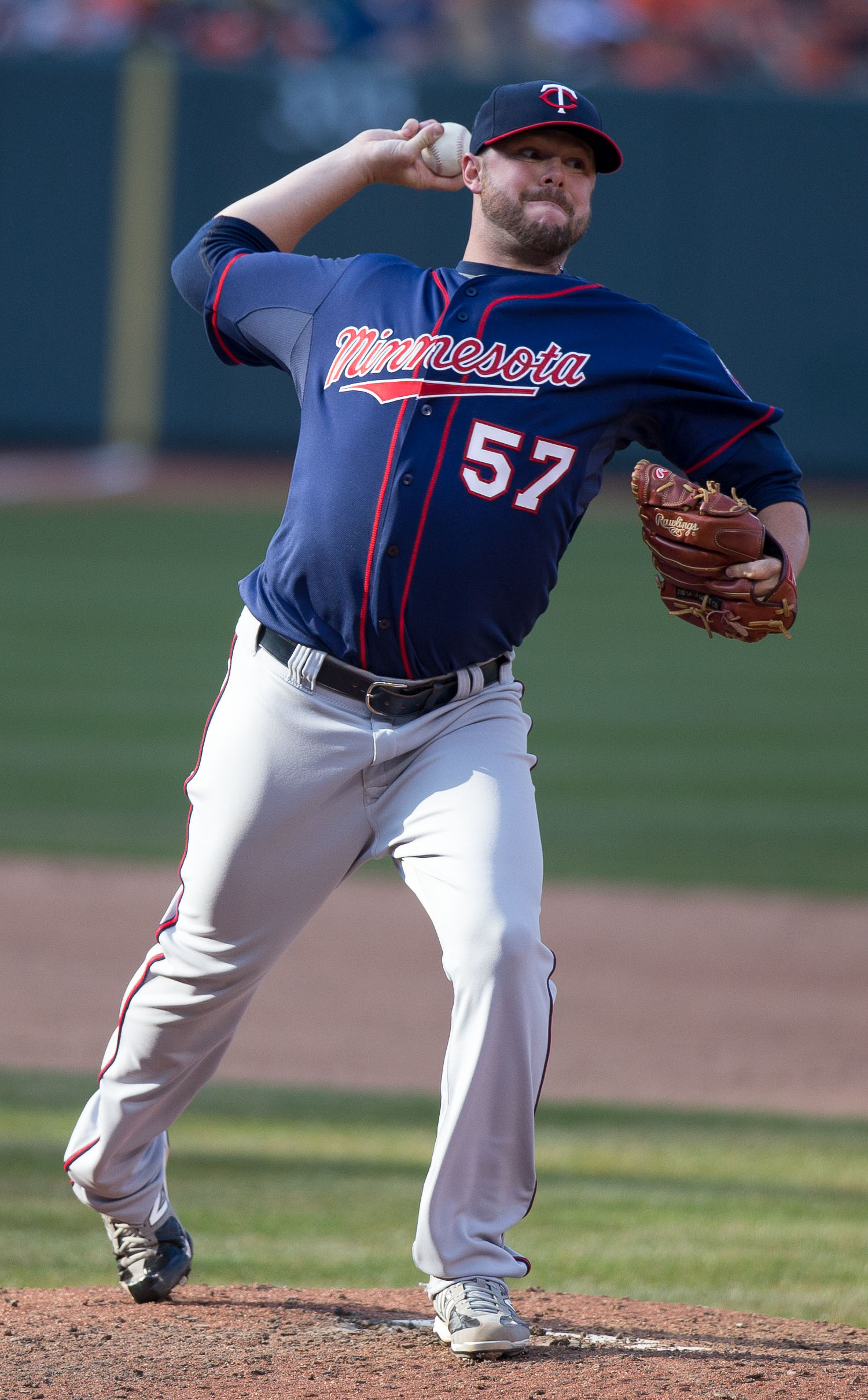
Ryan Pressly, pictured here with the Minnesota Twins, struck out the side in the ninth for the save in Game 4.

October 11, 2023 6:07 pm (CDT) at Target Field in Minneapolis, Minnesota 57 °F (14 °C), Clear
| Team | 1 | 2 | 3 | 4 | 5 | 6 | 7 | 8 | 9 | R | H | E |
|---|---|---|---|---|---|---|---|---|---|---|---|---|
| Houston | 0 | 1 | 0 | 2 | 0 | 0 | 0 | 0 | 0 | 3 | 5 | 0 |
| Minnesota | 1 | 0 | 0 | 0 | 0 | 1 | 0 | 0 | 0 | 2 | 3 | 0 |
WP: José Urquidy (1–0) LP: Caleb Thielbar (0–1) Sv: Ryan Pressly (2); Home runs: HOU: Michael Brantley (1), José Abreu (3); MIN: Royce Lewis (2), Edouard Julien (1); Attendance: 40,977; Boxscore

The Astros tabbed José Urquidy with starting Game 4 while Joe Ryan was tasked to try and extend the Twins season and send the game back to Houston. Royce Lewis started the Twins' scoring with a solo shot in the first. The home run was his fourth of the postseason, tying Kirby Puckett for most home runs in a single Twins postseason. The Astros answered back in the bottom of the frame with a Michael Brantley solo home run to tie it. José Abreu broke the tie in the fourth with a two-run homer off of Caleb Thielbar, his third of the series. Edouard Julien shortened the gap in the bottom of the sixth with a solo shot to bring the Twins within one, but Hector Neris struck out Max Kepler to end the threat. Urquidy threw 5 2/3 innings, striking out six while giving up two runs over three hits. Ryan Pressly shut the door on the Twins, striking out the side for his second save to preserve the Astros' 3–2 victory and win the series. For the Astros, it was their American League record seventh consecutive ALCS while the Twins lost their seventh straight ALDS.

=== Composite line score ===
2023 ALDS (3–1): Houston Astros beat Minnesota Twins

| Team | 1 | 2 | 3 | 4 | 5 | 6 | 7 | 8 | 9 | R | H | E |
|---|---|---|---|---|---|---|---|---|---|---|---|---|
| Minnesota Twins | 2 | 2 | 0 | 0 | 2 | 2 | 5 | 0 | 0 | 13 | 25 | 1 |
| Houston Astros | 5 | 1 | 2 | 2 | 3 | 1 | 1 | 2 | 3 | 20 | 35 | 0 |
Total attendance: 168,035 Average attendance: 42,008

== See also ==
- 2023 National League Division Series
