= Rocco Baldelli =

American baseball player and manager (born 1981)

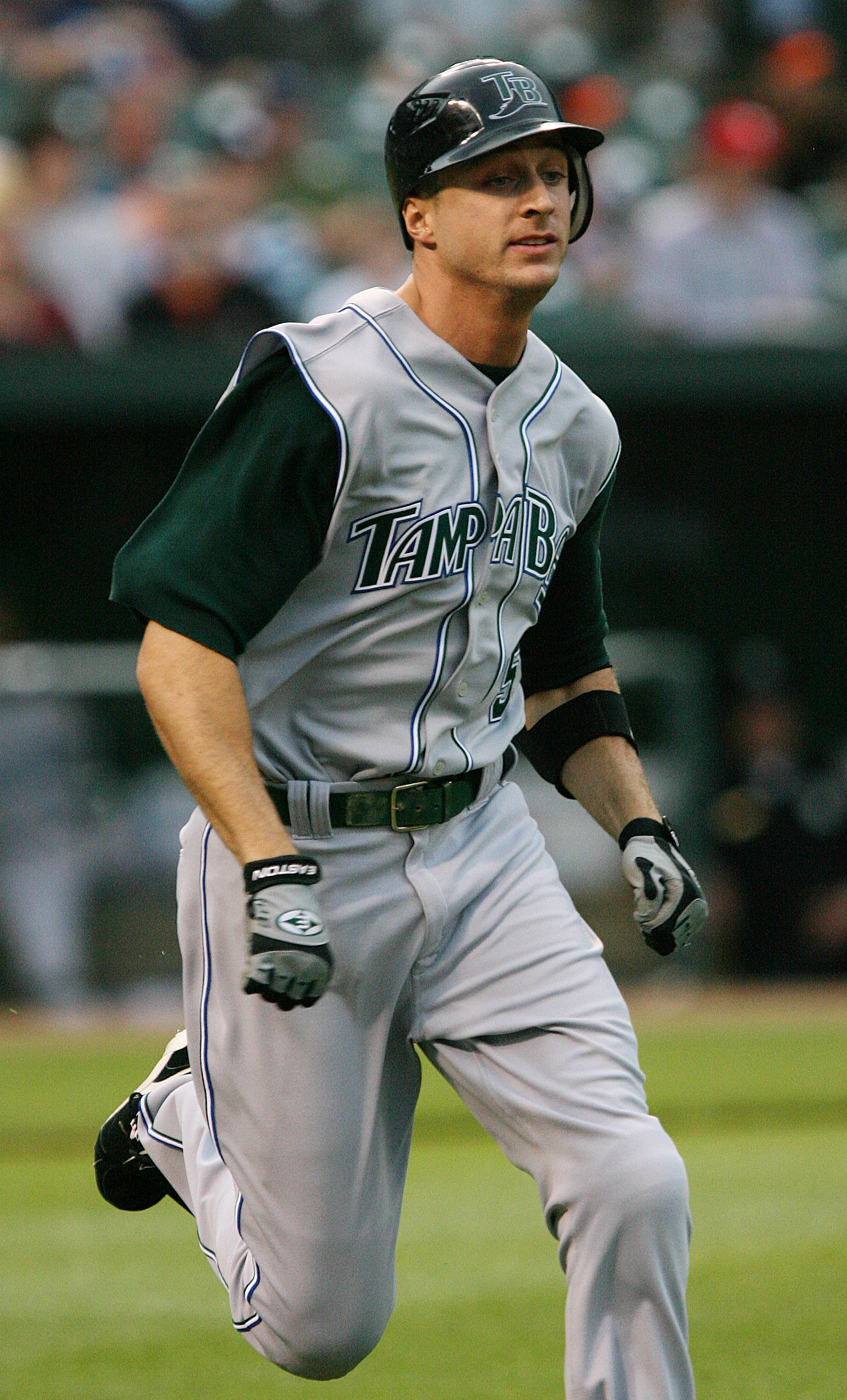
- Baldelli with the Tampa Bay Devil Rays in 2007
- Outfielder / Manager
- Born: September 25, 1981 (age 45); Woonsocket, Rhode Island, U.S.
- Batted: Right Threw: Right

MLB debut
- March 31, 2003, for the Tampa Bay Devil Rays

Last MLB appearance
- October 3, 2010, for the Tampa Bay Rays

MLB statistics
- Batting average: .278
- Home runs: 60
- Runs batted in: 262
- Managerial record: 527–505
- Winning %: .511
- Stats at Baseball Reference
- Managerial record at Baseball Reference

Teams
- As player: Tampa Bay Devil Rays / Rays (2003–2004, 2006–2008); Boston Red Sox (2009); Tampa Bay Rays (2010); As manager: Minnesota Twins (2019–2025); As coach: Tampa Bay Rays (2015–2018)

Career highlights and awards
- AL Manager of the Year (2019)

Rocco Daniel Baldelli (/bɔːlˈdɛli/; born September 25, 1981) is an American former professional baseball outfielder, coach and manager, who is currently an executive in the baseball operations department of the Los Angeles Dodgers. As a player, Baldelli quickly progressed through the minor leagues and made his Major League Baseball (MLB) debut with the Tampa Bay Devil Rays on opening day in 2003. Baldelli quickly established himself as an excellent hitter and outfielder, and placed third in voting for American League (AL) Rookie of the Year. He also played in MLB for the Boston Red Sox.

In 2005, Baldelli's promising career was derailed by channelopathy, a rare metabolic/muscular disorder which causes frequent soft tissue injuries and severe fatigue. He was unable to play at all in 2005 and missed significant time over the following seasons as doctors struggled to diagnose and treat his condition; from 2005 until his retirement in 2010, the former everyday center fielder spent long stretches on the disabled list and only once appeared in more than half of his team's games. Baldelli signed a free-agent contract with the Red Sox in 2009 and appeared in 62 games as a backup outfielder and part-time designated hitter. Unsure if he was physically capable of continuing his playing career, he returned to the Rays organization as a minor league coach in December 2009. As the 2010 season progressed, he decided to attempt another comeback and began rehabbing in the Rays' minor league system. Baldelli returned to the major leagues in September and hit a pinch-hit home run in his first at-bat. He appeared in 10 games over the last month of the regular season and was included on the Rays' playoff roster, but severe muscle cramping during the team's first round series forced him out of the lineup, at which point he decided to end his playing career at age 29.

After retiring as a player, Baldelli spent three years in the Tampa Bay Rays organization as a roving minor league instructor and special assistant to baseball operations. He was named the club's first base coach before the 2014 season and was promoted to major league field coordinator in November 2017.

Baldelli was named manager of the Minnesota Twins after the 2018 season. In 2019, he led them to 101 wins and an AL Central Division title and was named the 2019 American League manager of the year. At 38 years old, he was the youngest manager to win the award. He remained with the Twins through the 2025 season when he was fired from the position.

== Early life ==
Rocco Daniel Baldelli was born to Dan and Michele Baldelli in Woonsocket, Rhode Island. Rocco Baldelli attended the PEGASUS Gifted and Talented middle-school program at La Salle Academy in Providence. He played baseball for the Rhode Island Tides, an AAU ball club. Then he switched to Bishop Hendricken High School in Warwick, Rhode Island, for high school. During his senior year at Bishop Hendricken High School, he pulled his oblique muscle, but still managed to hit .531-5-13 with nine steals in only 32 at-bats. Not only did Baldelli excel at sports, but in the classroom as well. There he posted a 4.25 grade point average. On the SAT, he scored 1300, and considered attending University of North Carolina, Wake Forest University, Princeton University and Yale University. He was also a four sport star, earning all-state honors in baseball, indoor track, basketball, and volleyball.

== Professional baseball career ==
=== Minor leagues ===
The Tampa Bay Devil Rays picked Baldelli in the first round (6th overall) of the 2000 Major League Baseball draft, so he decided to decline an athletic scholarship offer from Wake Forest and signed with Tampa Bay for $2.25 million. He began his professional career with the Princeton Devil Rays, the team's High Rookie League affiliate.

Initially, Baldelli had to adjust to professional baseball. Says Baldelli, "In Princeton, I had a hard time with all parts of the game…I didn't know how to play the game. Coming out of high school, I'd just come up to the plate and swing as hard as I could every time and try to smoke the ball. I didn't know about hitting mechanics, breaking pitches or reading pitchers."

Baldelli overcame his struggles as a hitter and quickly rose through the Tampa Bay organization. In 2000, he was ranked the Tampa Bay Devil Rays' ninth-best prospect. In 2001, he was considered the fifth-best prospect in the organization. By 2002, just two years after being drafted sixth overall, he won the Baseball America Minor League Player of the Year Award.

=== Tampa Bay Devil Rays/Tampa Bay Rays ===
==== 2003–04: Early success ====
Baldelli made his major league debut on Opening Day 2003, starting in center field. He and fellow rookie outfielder Carl Crawford would be two of the few bright spots on a Devil Rays team that lost 91 games. Baldelli finished the 2003 season batting .289 with 11 home runs, 78 RBI, 89 runs scored and 27 stolen bases. He also finished in the top ten in many hitting categories in the American League. He was seventh in at bats with 637, tenth in hits 184, tied Ichiro Suzuki in eighth place with eight triples, and fourth in singles with 133. He also led the AL in outfield assists and ranked 2nd in range factor, indicating that he was one of the best defensive outfielders in baseball. Baldelli came in third in the voting for 2003 AL Rookie of the Year behind New York Yankees' outfielder Hideki Matsui and winner Ángel Berroa of the Kansas City Royals.

Baldelli had a similar sophomore campaign in 2004, batting .280 with 16 home runs, 74 runs batted in, 79 runs scored and 17 stolen bases. His defensive statistics were again among the league's best, as he led the AL in range factor and finished 4th in outfield assists.

==== 2005–06: Injuries and renewed success ====
Baldelli started the 2005 season on the disabled list after tearing his anterior cruciate ligament over the offseason while playing baseball with his brother. He had surgery and was expected to be back by the All-Star break. However, he seriously injured his elbow while working out and needed Tommy John surgery to fix the damage, which led to months more rehabilitation.

After missing almost a full season and a half, Baldelli returned to the D-Rays' lineup against the Los Angeles Angels of Anaheim on June 7, 2006. Baldelli was a regular starter in the outfield for the rest of the 2006 campaign and had his best statistical season, hitting .302 with 16 home runs, 57 runs batted in, 57 runs scored and 10 stolen bases in only 364 at bats and again appearing among the league leaders in multiple defensive categories.

==== 2007–08: Medical issues ====
In spring training before the 2007 season, Baldelli pulled his hamstring. The injury lingered, but Baldelli attempted to play, appearing in 35 games (15 as a designated hitter) and posting only a .204 batting average. He aggravated his hamstring in May and was placed on the DL on May 17. Doctors recommended a period of rest, after which Baldelli reported to the minor leagues for a rehab assignment. After several games, he injured his hamstring yet again and was shut down for the remainder of the 2007 season.

After these setbacks, Baldelli underwent extensive medical testing to determine the reasons for his muscle problems and worsening fatigue after even brief workouts. Doctors discovered some "metabolic and/or mitochondrial abnormalities" and began trying to design a medical plan to improve the condition.

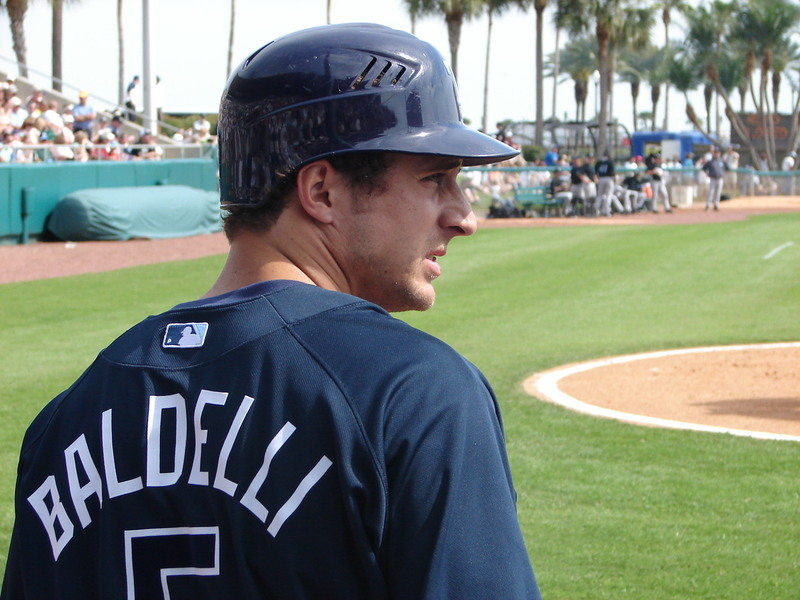
Baldelli during spring training in 2008

Baldelli attempted to return to game action during spring training in 2008, but his continuing physical problems made it impossible. On March 12, he held an emotional press conference in which he announced that he would be once again placed on the disabled list as he tried to find an effective treatment for his mysterious ailment. Though he did not retire, the future of his baseball career was in doubt. Accordingly, on April 1, 2008, the Rays declined Baldelli's contract option for the following season (2009), potentially making him a free agent after the season.

After further medical consultations, Baldelli's doctors found a combination of medications and nutritional supplements that seemed to improve his condition. On May 29, 2008, he began playing in extended spring training games, and in mid-June was sent to play in the Rays' minor league system for further rehabilitation and conditioning in the hope that he might return to the majors during the 2008 season.

==== Return to the field ====
On August 10, 2008, Baldelli was activated and started in right field for the Rays in a game against the Seattle Mariners. Baldelli had been growing a beard for months as a "symbol of his rehabilitation" and shaved it off before playing. In the contest, he had an RBI single as well as a diving catch before coming out of the game after the 5th inning.

Baldelli ended up appearing in 28 games for the Rays in 2008, mainly as a DH and pinch hitter but occasionally playing in right or left field. He hit .263 with 4 home runs and 13 RBI, and was deemed valuable enough to be included in the Rays' postseason roster as they made the playoffs for the first time.

Baldelli made an impact in his limited post-season playing time. In Game 3 of the 2008 American League Championship Series, Baldelli hit a three-run home run off Boston's Paul Byrd in the eighth inning to help the Rays take a 2-1 series lead. In the decisive Game 7 of the ALCS, his RBI single in the fifth inning gave the Rays their first lead of the game en route to winning their first American League pennant. In Game 2 of the World Series against the Philadelphia Phillies, Baldelli made a double play by catching a fly ball and throwing back to first baseman Carlos Peña in time to beat Jayson Werth. Finally, in Game 5, Baldelli hit a solo home run in the top of the seventh that tied the game for the Rays, although it wouldn't prevent the Rays from losing the game and ultimately the series.

Because of Baldelli's performance in the 2008 ALCS, many become aware about mitochondrial disease and how it affects the many people that have it. One article reported that a child with mitochondrial disease pretends he is Baldelli when he is at bat. During the Red Sox series, the United Mitochondrial Disease Foundation created a page on its website where children and parents could post notes for Baldelli. One such post read "I am a nine year old boy with Mito. I also like to play baseball. Great home run in the playoffs, I am cheering for you at home. How are you feeling?"

Overall, Baldelli hit .200 in 20 postseason at-bats with two home runs and six RBI. While improved, his medical condition prevented him from playing in back-to-back games, and he sometimes sat down to rest on the field during breaks in the action.

After the season, Baldelli was the recipient of the 2008 Tony Conigliaro Award, which is annually presented to a major league player who has "overcome adversity through the attributes of spirit, determination and courage that were trademarks of Tony Conigliaro."

==== New diagnosis ====
During the 2008-09 offseason, further medical testing indicated that Baldelli suffers from a form of mitochondrial channelopathy, which makes his condition less serious and more treatable than previous diagnoses had suggested. Mitochondrial channelopathy is a rare cell disorder that affects ions in neurological "pathways" and causes severe muscle fatigue and can be life-threatening, but Baldelli was diagnosed with a moderate form which can be managed with medication and diet. However, in Baldelli's case, the condition was complicated by lingering symptoms of Lyme disease, which he contracted as a teenager.

=== Boston Red Sox ===
On January 8, 2009, Baldelli signed a one-year deal with the Boston Red Sox, reported to be worth a base of $500,000 plus up to $6.75 million in incentives. As Baldelli grew up in New England, much of his family were Red Sox fans and he considered it a "childhood dream" to play for the team. He continued to wear number 5, becoming the first Red Sox player to wear that number since the departure of fan favorite Nomar Garciaparra in 2004.

Baldelli hit his first home run for the Red Sox on May 9, 2009, at Fenway Park against his old team, the Rays. For much of the season, however, he continued to struggle through physical ailments, landing on the 15-day DL twice and sitting out numerous contests with hamstring pulls and other issues.

For the year, Baldelli appeared in 62 games for the Red Sox, hitting .253 with seven home runs, 23 RBI, and a stolen base. Boston made the playoffs as the AL wildcard team, but a shoulder injury kept Baldelli off the team's postseason roster. After the season, he became a free agent.

=== Second stint with Rays ===
During spring training 2010, Baldelli returned to the Tampa Bay Rays as a special assistant to observe and coach players in the organization's minor league system on baserunning and outfield defense. While his continuing fatigue problems and a lingering shoulder issue made it impossible for him to play baseball, he expressed the desire to eventually return to the field with the Rays if his physical condition improved. On July 19, 2010, Baldelli signed a minor league deal with the Rays and joined the Charlotte Stone Crabs, the team's Single-A affiliate. He gradually increased his playing time and was promoted to Triple-A with the Durham Bulls on August 16. The club stated that his health and success on the field would determine if he would be called up to the majors later on in the season.

On September 1, Baldelli was called up to the major league squad to serve as a designated hitter, pinch hitter, and reserve outfielder. On September 5, in his first at-bat since returning to the Rays' roster, Baldelli hit an 8th inning pinch hit 2-run home run against the Baltimore Orioles in Camden Yards and finished the game in right field. Baldelli played occasionally throughout September, was included on the Rays' postseason roster, and started at DH for the first game of the 2010 playoffs against the Texas Rangers. However, he suffered muscle cramping during the game and had to be removed for a pinch hitter, and the Rays replaced him on their playoff roster the next day, again putting his playing career in doubt.

=== Retirement as player ===
Baldelli privately decided to retire soon after his medical condition forced him out of the 2010 ALDS, but Rays' executive Andrew Friedman advised him to take some time to think about the decision before announcing it publicly. After three months of consideration, Baldelli officially announced his retirement on January 26, 2011, at 29 years old, stating that due to his illness, "I physically don't feel like I should be playing anymore." He remained in the Rays organization as a "special adviser" working in scouting and player development.

Though Baldelli's career was cut short, he remained popular among Rays fans. The team invited him to throw the ceremonial first pitch before Game 4 of the 2013 ALDS and the fans at Tropicana Field gave him a standing ovation.

=== Playing style ===
Baldelli was a balanced ballplayer who could hit for average and power, had good speed in the field and on the basepaths, and a strong throwing arm. As a promising young player, some baseball observers opined that Baldelli's skillset reminded them of Hall of Fame centerfielder Joe DiMaggio, with veteran scout Al LaMacchia claiming that Baldelli had the potential to be "Joe's twin".

== Post-playing career ==
=== Tampa Bay Rays coach (2012–2018) ===
After ending his playing career in 2011, Baldelli remained with the Rays organization as a Special Assistant for Baseball Operations and roving minor league hitting and outfield defense instructor. In December 2014, Baldelli was named the Rays' first base coach under new manager Kevin Cash, who had been Baldelli's teammate on the club in 2005. Before the 2017 season, the Rays organization promoted Baldelli to the newly created role of major-league field coordinator, which involved analyzing the tendencies of opposing hitters, coaching defensive skills to players, and helping the team implement defensive strategies during games.

=== Minnesota Twins manager (2019–2025) ===
After the 2018 season, Baldelli was a popular candidate for several managerial positions and was interviewed for that position by several major league clubs. On October 25, 2018, he was introduced as the new manager of the Minnesota Twins. After posting 78 wins the previous season, the Twins won 101 games and the American League Central division in Baldelli's first season at the helm. On November 12, 2019, Baldelli was named American League manager of the year for the 2019 MLB season, beating out New York Yankees manager Aaron Boone and Tampa Bay Rays manager Kevin Cash, who finished second and third, respectively. At 38 years old, he was the youngest winner of the award. In 2020, he was the youngest manager in major league baseball.

In 2022 he led all major league managers in challenges, with 51, and tied for the lead in overturns (26) with Buck Showalter (who made 33 challenges).

In 2023, Baldelli led the Twins to a series win in the 2023 American League Wild Card Series over the Toronto Blue Jays, their first playoff series win since the 2002 American League Division Series. However, the Twins would lose in the 2023 American League Division Series to the Houston Astros.

In 2024, the team suffered a historic collapse and missed the playoffs despite 95% odds to make it.

On September 29, 2025, the Twins announced that Baldelli would not return for the 2026 season after back-to-back fourth-place finishes in the AL Central Division.

=== Los Angeles Dodgers executive (2026–present) ===
On December 9, 2025, the Los Angeles Dodgers hired Baldelli to serve as a special assistant to president of baseball operations Andrew Friedman.

=== Managerial record ===
Team	Year	Regular season					Postseason			
Team	Year	Games	Won	Lost	Win %	Finish	Won	Lost	Win %	Result
MIN	2019	162	101	61	.623	1st in AL Central	0	3	.000	Lost ALDS (NYY)
MIN	2020	60	36	24	.600	1st in AL Central	0	2	.000	Lost ALWC (HOU)
MIN	2021	162	73	89	.451	5th in AL Central			–	
MIN	2022	162	78	84	.481	3rd in AL Central			–	
MIN	2023	162	87	75	.537	1st in AL Central	3	3	.500	Lost ALDS (HOU)
MIN	2024	162	82	80	.506	4th in AL Central			–	
MIN	2025	162	70	92	.432	4th in AL Central			–	
Total		1032	527	505	.511		3	8	.273	

== Personal life ==
After a decade of being together, Baldelli married his girlfriend Allie in July 2021. Daughter Louisa was born in September of that year. Fraternal twins Nino and Enzo were born in September 2023.

In 2004, Baldelli was inducted into the Rhode Island Italian-American Hall of Fame. Baldelli has listed his other interests as traveling, fishing and playing the bass guitar. He is the son of Dan and Michelle Baldelli and has two brothers, Nicholas (a dentist) and Dante. His brother Dante played college baseball for the Boston College Eagles baseball team. He resides both in St. Pete Beach, Florida and Rhode Island, where his parents still live.

Baldelli is a horse owner with an interest in breeding and racing Thoroughbreds.

Baldelli is the nephew of Woonsocket mayor and former Rhode Island state representative Lisa Baldelli-Hunt. Baldelli, a registered Democrat, has donated money to various Democrat candidates, including Bernie Sanders in 2016 and Joe Biden in 2020.

Baldelli is a fan of Phish, the Grateful Dead, Greensky Bluegrass, JRAD and Spafford.

Sporting positions
Preceded by George Hendrick	Tampa Bay Rays first base coach 2015–2017	Succeeded by Ozzie Timmons
