= 2024 Houston Astros season =

63rd season in Major League Baseball for the Houston Astros

2024 Houston Astros
- American League West champions
- League: American League
- Division: West
- Ballpark: Minute Maid Park
- City: Houston, Texas
- Record: 88–73 (.547)
- Divisional place: 1st
- Owners: Jim Crane
- General managers: Dana Brown
- Managers: Joe Espada
- Television: Space City Home Network (Todd Kalas, Kevin Eschenfelder, Geoff Blum, Jeff Bagwell, Mike Stanton, Julia Morales)
- Radio: KTRH 740 Weekday Night Games Sportstalk 790; Houston Astros Radio Network (Robert Ford, Steve Sparks, Geoff Blum, Michael Coffin); KLAT (Spanish) (Francisco Romero, Alex Treviño)
- Stats: ESPN.com; Baseball Reference

The 2024 Houston Astros season was the 63rd season for the Major League Baseball (MLB) franchise located in Houston, Texas, their 60th as the Astros, 12th in both the American League (AL) and AL West division, and 25th at Minute Maid Park. They entered the season as three-time defending AL West champions with a 90–72 record and runners-up of the American League.

The 2024 season was the first for the Space City Home Network (SCHN) to televise Astros games, who, with the Houston Rockets of the National Basketball Association (NBA), created after acquiring and rebranding the regional sports network AT&T SportsNet Southwest from Warner Bros. Discovery. The Astros promoted bench coach Joe Espada as the 25th manager in franchise history, succeeding Dusty Baker.

On April 1, pitcher Ronel Blanco threw the 17th no-hitter in Astros history against the Toronto Blue Jays. It was also the earliest date a no-hitter has been thrown in MLB history. More history was made as the no-hitter marked Espada's first career win as manager, the first occurrence in MLB history where a manager got his first win with a no-hitter.

The Astros had a slow start to the season, as they fell to 12–24 after their first 36 games. The largest deficit by which the Astros trailed in the AL West was 10 games on June 18, when their record was 33–40. Following a seven-game winning streak, on June 26, the Astros claimed their 40th win to reach .500 for the first time on the season.

Jose Altuve, Yordan Alvarez, and Kyle Tucker were each named to the AL All-Star team. Walker Janek, a catcher from Sam Houston State, was the Astros' top selection from the 2024 MLB draft, at number 28 overall. On July 21 at T-Mobile Park, Alvarez hit for the cycle, the tenth occurrence in franchise history. The Astros' pitching staff produced a record-setting August and threw three additional no-hit bids of 7 2/3 innings or more, (Note: Four total such performances by Astros pitching in 2024, in addition to Blanco's no-hitter on April 1.) including one by starting pitcher Spencer Arrighetti, who was named AL Rookie of the Month. Meanwhile, closer Josh Hader was AL Reliever of the Month.

On September 13, the Astros beat the Los Angeles Angels to attain the 5,000th win in franchise history, becoming only the second expansion team to do so. (Note: The Colt .45s/Astros also become the 18th major league team to reach 5,000 wins.)

On September 24, the Astros clinched the AL West division title for the fourth consecutive season and the seventh in the past eight seasons. They also clinched a postseason berth for the eighth consecutive season and the ninth in the past 10 seasons. On September 29, the Astros season finale against the Cleveland Guardians was canceled due to weather concerns. As such, the Astros finished with an 88–73 record and did not play the season finale. The Astros were the fifth team to start 22–28 and win their division in MLB history. The Astros were swept by the Detroit Tigers in the American League Wild Card Series, ending their streak of consecutive ALCS appearances at seven (2017–2023), which was the most in the American League and the second-most consecutive LCS appearances after the Atlanta Braves' consecutive NLCS appearances of eight (1991–1999, excluding 1994 that was not played due to a players' strike). The Astros were also swept in a postseason series for the first time since the 2005 World Series.

Following the season, Alex Bregman won his first career Gold Glove Award, Altuve won his seventh career Silver Slugger Award, while Altuve, Alvarez, and Opening Day starting pitcher Framber Valdez were each named to the All-MLB Team Second Team. Altuve's ninth career All-Star selection and seventh Silver Slugger both extended franchise records.

== Offseason ==
=== October 2023 ===
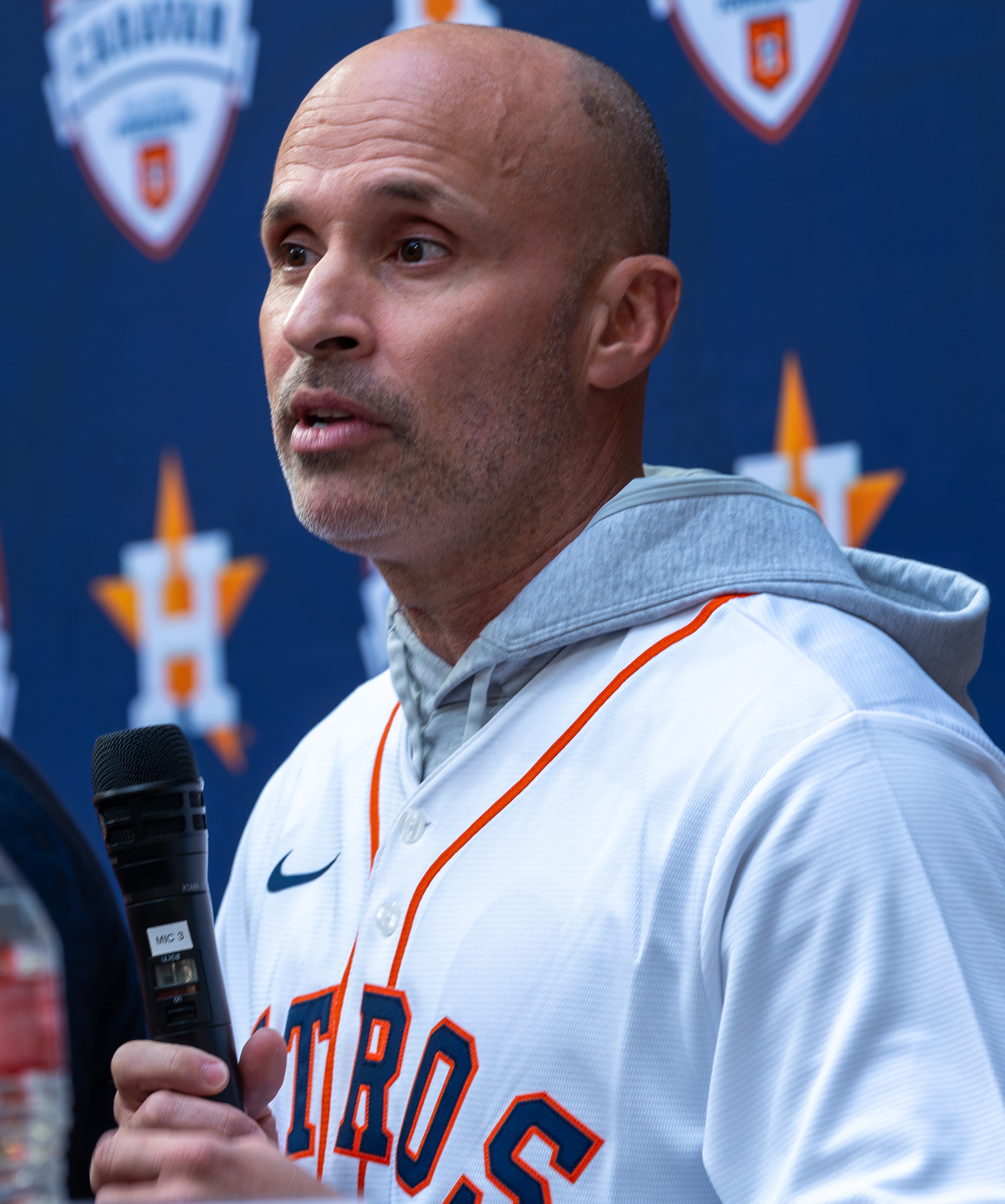
The Astros hired Joe Espada as their 25th manager, replacing Dusty Baker.

The Houston Astros finished the 2023 season as runner up for the American League (AL) pennant behind the defending World Series champions Texas Rangers. The Astros entered the offseason with uncertainty at the managerial position as Dusty Baker had completed the last year of his contract and had expressed to multiple people inside and outside the organization that 2023 was to be his last year managing the club.

On October 25, it was announced that Baker would retire as manager of the Astros. The Astros posted a 320–226 (.586) record with Baker as manager, winning a World Series (2022) and two AL pennants (2021, 2022).

=== November 2023 ===
On November 13, it was announced that bench coach Joe Espada, who had been with the organization since the 2018 season, would be named the new manager of the Astros.

=== December 2023 ===
On December 6, the Astros announced that they had acquired right-handed pitcher Dylan Coleman from the Kansas City Royals in exchange for minor league pitcher Carlos Mateo.

The following day, the team officially announced that they had signed catcher Víctor Caratini to a two-year contract worth $12 million.

=== January 2024 ===
On January 16, the team announced that reliever Kendall Graveman was set to miss the entire 2024 season after undergoing surgery on his shoulder.

Six days later, on January 22, the team announced that they had signed left-handed pitcher Josh Hader to a five-year contract worth $95 million.

On January 31, the Astros acquired Trey Cabbage from the Los Angeles Angels in exchange for minor league pitcher Carlos Espinosa.

=== February and March 2024 ===
On February 6, the team announced that they had extended 2nd baseman Jose Altuve for five years and $125 million.

Per Forbes, the Astros' net value was estimated at $2.425 billion, ranking 11th MLB. The Astros partnered with the Houston Rockets of the National Basketball Association (NBA) to acquire regional sports network AT&T SportsNet Southwest and rebrand it as Space City Home Network (SCHN). The network was launched to the public on October 3, 2023, the 2024 season was the first season for the Astros to broadcast on SCHN. The moves implied a loss of an estimated $23 million of revenue; however, Warner Bros. Discovery (WBD) had announced they would discontinue broadcasts for Houston, the Colorado Rockies, Texas Rangers, and other clubs, leaving no airing of home games for those respective clubs.

=== Transactions ===
==== November 2023 ====
November 2	RHPs Phil Maton and Ryne Stanek, LF Michael Brantley and C Martín Maldonado elected free agency
November 7	RHP Héctor Neris elected free agency after declining player option.

==== December 2023 ====
December 6	Kansas City Royals traded right-handed pitcher Dylan Coleman to Houston Astros for right-handed pitcher Carlos Mateo
December 7	Astros signed catcher Víctor Caratini to a 2 year, $12 million contract

==== January 2024 ====
January 22	Astros signed left-handed pitcher Josh Hader to a 5 year, $95 million contract
January 31	Los Angeles Angels traded infielder/outfielder Trey Cabbage to Houston Astros for right-handed pitcher Carlos Espinosa

==== February 2024 ====
February 6	Astros signed 2nd baseman Jose Altuve to a 5 year, $125 million contract extension

=== Departures ===
- Outfielder Michael Brantley announced his retirement from professional baseball on January 5, 2024.
- Catcher Martín Maldonado and the Chicago White Sox officially agreed on a one-year contract worth $4.25 million on January 5, 2024.
- Right-handed pitcher Héctor Neris and the Chicago Cubs officially agreed on a one-year contract worth $9 million with a team option for the 2025 season on February 1, 2024.

=== Additions ===
- Dylan Coleman was acquired by the Houston Astros from the Kansas City Royals in exchange for minor league pitcher Carlos Mateo.
- Signed catcher Víctor Caratini to a two-year contract worth $12 million.
- Signed left handed reliever Josh Hader to a five-year contract worth $95 million.
- Trey Cabbage was acquired by the Houston Astros from the Los Angeles Angels in exchange for minor league pitcher Carlos Espinosa.

== Spring training ==
The Astros kicked off their spring training against the Washington Nationals on February 24.

Right handers Lance McCullers Jr. and Luis García entered the 2024 season rehabilitating elbow injuries. García was recovvering from ulnar collateral ligament reconstruction (UCL reconstruction, also known as Tommy John surgery), for an injury sustained early in May 2023. He was expected to miss the start of the 2024 season. McCullers was recovering from a flexor tendon strain first sustained in the 2021 American League Division Series (ALDS) and had not appeared in a major league game since the 2022 World Series. In February 2023, he strained it again and elected for season-ending surgery the following June.

Three-time Cy Young Award winner Justin Verlander also missed the start of the season due to right shoulder inflammation.

== Regular season ==
=== Summary ===
==== March—April ====
By making the Opening Day roster and playing for the Astros, right-handed relief pitcher Tayler Scott became the first South African to play for Houston. Also the first South African pitcher in MLB history, he made his MLB debut in 2019, pitched for six teams, and an additional two years in Nippon Professional Baseball (NPB), before joining Houston.

==== Opening Series ====
March 28 – 31 vs New York Yankees: HOU lost series, 0–4

Opening Day starting lineup
Uniform	Player	Position	Starts
27	Jose Altuve	Second baseman	12
44	Yordan Alvarez	Designated hitter	4
30	Kyle Tucker	Right fielder	4
2	Alex Bregman	Third baseman	8
79	José Abreu	First baseman	2
20	Chas McCormick	Left fielder	2
21	Yainer Díaz	Catcher	2
3	Jeremy Peña	Shortstop	3
6	Jake Meyers	Center fielder	2
59	Framber Valdez	Pitcher	3
Venue: Minute Maid Park • Final: New York (AL) 5, Houston 4 Sources:

The Astros dropped their Opening Day game, March 28, to the New York Yankees, 5–4. In the ninth inning, Kyle Tucker singled with Mauricio Dubón and Yordan Alvarez on base. However, right fielder Juan Soto delivered an accurate throw to home plate that allowed catcher Jose Trevino tag out Dubón to preserve the Yankees' lead and eventual victory.

The Yankees swept the opening 4-game series, led by Soto's 9-for-17 (.529 batting average) and 4 runs batted in (RBI). The Astros' seventh loss in a row to the Yankees, it was the first time they dropped their first four to begin a season since 2011 (0–5).

==== Ronel Blanco's no-hitter ====
On April 1, Ronel Blanco (1–0) no-hit the Toronto Blue Jays to lead a 10–0 rout for Astros' first win of the season, the first win for Joe Espada as manager and the earliest calendar-date no-hitter in MLB history. (Note: The earliest no-hitter thrown preceding Blanco's was by Hideo Nomo for the Boston Red Sox on April 4, 2001.) The eighth career major league start and first of the season for Blanco, it was the 17th no-hitter in franchise history. Espada became the first manager to earn his premier major league victory via the no-hitter, per the Elias Sports Bureau (ESB). Kyle Tucker led Houston's offense with two home runs.

Blanco's no-hitter signified the third consecutive season in which Astros pitching had tossed a no-hitter, tying an American League record for the fifth time overall. (Note: The Major League record is four, established by the 1962 to 1965 Los Angeles Dodgers.) The most recent American League club to pitch no-hitters over three successive campaigns were the 1973 to 1975 California Angels. Each of the Angels' no-hitters during that span was pitched by Nolan Ryan, who later tossed another for the Astros on September 26, 1981. Blanco's no-hitter succeeded Framber Valdez' effort on August 1, 2023, as the most recent by an Astros moundsman.

==== Rest of April ====
On April 3, Cristian Javier (1–0) and four relievers combined on a one-hit, 8–0 shutout of Toronto: Javier pitched the first five innings, allowing the one hit, and Seth Martinez, Rafael Montero, Tayler Scott, and Dylan Coleman each tossed an inning. Coleman made his Astros debut this game. Yordan Alvarez homered twice and tied a career-high with four hits, his 16th career multi-homer and sixth four-hit game. Jose Altuve and Jeremy Peña also homered for the Astros.

In his next start on April 7, Blanco tossed another 5 2/3 no-hit innings until a single hit by Adolis García of the Texas Rangers ended 14 2/3 consecutive no-hit innings. Blanco set an expansion-era record (Note: Since 1961.) of 44 outs recorded to begin a season before allowing a hit. With Framber Valdez being skipped from making his start on April 8 due elbow soreness, Blair Henley made major league debut versus the Rangers. He retired just one of nine batters faced and allowed five runs as the Astros trailed 5–2 after one inning. Alvarez collected three hits, including a home run, and Victor Caratini hit a three-run home run as the Astros came back to win, 10–5. Seth Martinez (1–0) worked 3 2/3 scoreless innings, and Scott and Brandon Bielak each worked an additional two innings.

Following the no-hitter and record-breaking streak of consecutive batters retired without a hit, Blanco was named the AL Player of the Week for the first time in for his career for April 7.

On April 10, Spencer Arrighetti made his major league debut for the Astros, as the starting pitcher versus the Kansas City Royals at Kauffman Stadium. The Royals staked seven runs in the third inning, which finished Arrighetti's outing. The Royals won, 11–2, and extended a winning streak to 6 consecutive. The Royals continued their hot hitting the following day. They collected 11 hits in the first inning alone versus starter Hunter Brown, who became the first pitcher in major league history to allow 11 hits in less than one inning, which then led to nine runs. Brown tallied 2/3 inning before being removed.

Alex Bregman recorded his 1,000th career hit on April 25, a single in the sixth inning in a 3–1 loss to the Chicago Cubs. He became the 14th player to amass as many hits as a member of the Astros. The loss dropped the Astros record to 7–19, the first time since 2014 they had been 12 games under .500 at any point, and second-worst 26-game start.

Mexico City Series, April 27 – 28 at Colorado Rockies: HOU won series, 2–0

As part of the MLB World Tour, the Astros and Rockies participated in the 2024 edition of the MLB Mexico City Series, with the Rockies designated as the home team for the two contests, played at Estadio Alfredo Harp Helú in Mexico City. The two clubs owned the majors' two worst won–lost records; the Astros (7–19) entered the series a season-worst 12 games under .500 and in last place in the AL West. The Astros won the opener, 12–4, to snap a five-game losing streak. Yordan Alvarez was 3-for-5 with two home runs and five RBI. Kyle Tucker also homered and Yainer Díaz collected three hits and three runs scored. In the second game, Framber Valdez pitched for the first time since April 2, logging five innings in an 8–2 win. Tucker, Jose Altuve, and Jeremy Peña all homered for Houston. Entering the final game of the series, Astros' starters had ranked 28th in the majors in ERA (4.95).

Joey Loperfido made his major league debut on April 30 versus the Cleveland Guardians, and hit a two-run bases loaded single in fifth inning for his first major league hit and RBI. In the tenth, Caratini's walk-off, pinch hit home run in the 10th inning secured a 10–9 final to give the Astros (10–19) their first three-game winning streak of the season. Josh Hader (1–2) picked up the ninth and tenth innings for his first two-inning relief outing since 2019, and his first win in an Astros uniform.

Hunter Brown ended the month of April with one of the worst months of his career, including going 0–4 with a 9.78 ERA to start the season.

==== May ====
The Astros won the series finale versus the Guardians on May 2, 8–2, and also won a second consecutive series for the first time on the season. In the sixth inning, the Astros trailed 2–1 when Jeremy Peña tripled. Jon Singleton then hit a two-run home run to give the Astros the lead. Jake Meyers tripled to start the seventh and Jose Altuve's single scored him, increasing the lead to 4–2. Tyler Beede hit Peña with the bases loaded; Yainer Diaz followed with a two-run single. Singleton hit a sacrifice fly to further add to the lead, 8–2. Altuve had three hits. Tayler Scott (1–1) worked 1 1/3 scoreless innings to earn his first major league win. In spite of the win, the Astros (11–20) occupied last place in the AL West.

On May 3, Jose Altuve pilfered the 300th base of his career in the seventh inning against the Seattle Mariners. Altuve became the third player in Astros history with at least 300 steals, joining César Cedeño (487) and Craig Biggio (414). (Note: Further, Altuve joined Hall of Famers Roberto Alomar, Derek Jeter, Willie Mays, and Paul Molitor as the only major leaguers hit at least a .300 lifetime batting average and reach 2,000 hits, 400 doubles, 200 home runs and 300 steals.)

On May 8, the Yankees defeated the Astros, 9–4, powered by home runs from each of Soto, Aaron Judge, and Giancarlo Stanton. Rookie Spencer Arrighetti (0–4) allowed five runs on eight hits over five innings, including all three home runs by the Yankees' power trio. Kyle Tucker and Jeremy Peña both hit home runs for Houston in the Astros' fourth loss in a row, dropping their record to 12–24. The Yankees started 6–0 against the Astros in 2024, and had been 11–2 since the start of 2023. After the loss, the Astros' pitching staff earned run average (ERA) stood at 5.05, the third-highest in the major leagues.

Alex Bregman authored his sixth career multi-homer game and Spencer Arrighetti (1–4) allowed two runs over five innings on May 13 to lead a 9–2 win over Oakland. It was Arrighetti's first major league win.

Caratini delivered another pinch-hit, walk-off 10th-inning hit on May 14, this time a 2–1 win over Oakland. Hader (2–3) worked the final two innings to earn his second win as an Astro. The late-game heroics followed Ronel Blanco's shortest outing of the season to date, who, after having completed the third inning, was ejected by umpire Laz Díaz during a routine foreign substance check.

Blanco was suspended for 10 games and fined an undisclosed sum by MLB the day following the ejection.

On May 16, Joey Loperfido hit his first major league home run and Cristian Javier (3–1) hurled six scoreless innings to lead an Astros' 8–1 win and finish a four-game sweep of Oakland. In their six run third inning, Yainer Díaz hit a three-run double and Loperfido added his two-run home run off Joey Estes (1–1). It had been a season-high five-game winning streak to that point for the Astros.

Jake Meyers hit a three-run home run on May 24 as Justin Verlander struck out nine and allowed two runs (one earned) to lead the Astros 6–3 win over Oakland. Meyers' home run highlighted a six-run fourth inning for the Astros. Verlander (3–2) struck out Abraham Toro to pass Hall of Famer Greg Maddux (3,371) for 10th place on the all-time strikeout list, finishing the outing with 3,377, and won the 260th game of his career. Toro had been instrumental in securing Verlander's third no-hitter in Toronto in 2019, hitting a home run in the ninth inning that accounted for the only runs of the contest for a 2–0 Astros' final, as well as fielding the final out of the game.

==== June ====
On June 3, Alex Bregman hit a game-tying home run leading off the eighth inning and Yainer Díaz homered that same inning to lead a 7–4 win over the St. Louis Cardinals. It was Bregman's fifth home run over his previous seven games. Kyle Tucker departed in the third inning after fouling a pitch off his right shin. Pinch hitter Mauricio Dubón took Tucker's place in the at bat, drew a walk, and Yordan Alvarez followed with a home run. X-ray on Tucker's leg following the game were negative.

Cristian Javier made 7 starts for the Astros and pitched 34 2/3 innings before it was announced on June 5 that he would undergo UCL reconstruction (Tommy John surgery), ending his season prematurely. On this date, starter José Urquidy, who had not pitched in 2024, was also announced for required elbow surgery that would end his season.

Kyle Tucker was removed from the game on June 7 versus the Los Angeles Angels due to a shin contusion as a result of a foul ball hit off his right leg, and was later placed on the 10-day injured list (IL). His 19 home runs tied for second in the AL with Gunnar Henderson and Tucker was fourth in OPS at .979. In early September as Tucker still had to yet to be activated, the extent of the injury was revealed to be a fracture, though that was indiscernible from early radiologic scans.

The Astros released Jose Abreu on June 14, nearly at the halfway point of a 3-year, $58.5 million contract signed during the 2022–23 offseason. In 714 regular season plate appearances in an Astros uniform, he slashed .217/.275/.351.

Victor Caratini hit his first major league triple on June 15 off Jack Flaherty in 12–5 loss to the Detroit Tigers at Minute Maid Park. Ronel Blanco tossed seven hitless innings versus Detroit on June 16 before Ryan Pressly allowed a single by Wenceel Pérez for Detroit's with two outs in the eighth.

Following a 2–0 shutout defeat to the Chicago White Sox in a series opener on June 18, the Astros' record was 33–40, distancing them 10 games from the Seattle Mariners for the AL West lead, their largest deficit of the season. It was the first time since the final day of the 2016 season that Houston was 10 games behind for the division lead. The Astros also placed ace Justin Verlander on the injured list. The following day, Hunter Brown (4–5) pitched six strong innings with one run allowed, catcher César Salazar drove in 2 runs with his first career multi-hit game in the majors, and Jake Meyers scored two runs on a pair of doubles to end an 0–17 slump. Brown lowered his season ERA to 4.72. In the series finale, Yordan Alvarez drove in two runs—including a home run—and Alex Bregman collected three hits and a run scored to key the Astros' 5–3 win and take 2 of 3 from the White Sox.

On June 19, the Astros placed Justin Verlander on the 15-day injured list (IL) due to lingering neck discomfort, and on June 21, placed Caratini on the 10-day IL as a result of a left hip flexor strain.

On June 23, Framber Valdez (6–5) allowed 6 hits and 1 run over 7 innings relievers in an 8–1 win over the Baltimore Orioles. Jeremy Peña and Yainer Diaz collected three RBI each. Jose Altuve hit a leadoff home run and Alex Bregman collected a season-high four hits as the Astros scored four times in the first inning. Bryan King and Luis Contreras both made their major league debut for the Astros, successively pitching one scoreless inning each in the eighth and ninth.

The Astros reached a .500 winning percentage (40–40) for the first time in 2024 on June 26 following a 7–1 win over Colorado which concluded a two-game sweep at Minute Maid Park and established a season-high seven-game winning steak. Arrighetti (4–6) set a personal achievement with 10 strikeouts, which also set the highest for the Astros' rotation for the season to date.

On June 30, Altuve was ejected from the game against the New York Mets after arguing that a ball he had hit was not in play. He was ruled thrown out on a ground ball to Mark Vientos, but did not run out the batted ball after it instead appeared to have struck his left foot.

In June, Brown pitched to a 1.16 ERA, 4–0 W–L, 36 strikeouts, and 8 walks over 31 innings. He posted the lowest ERA in MLB for the month.

==== July ====
The Astros won on July 1 for the 10th time in 11 games with a 3–1 win over Toronto. Hunter Brown (5–6) pitched six shutout innings with two hits and three walks allowed, and Yordan Alvarez and Jeremy Peña both homered for Houston. On July 3, Altuve stroked a tie-breaking single in a four-run seventh inning Alvarez homered for a third consecutive game, doubled twice and also scored via an intentional base on balls. Catcher Yainer Díaz also reached base four times and drove in three runs.

The Rangers snapped the Astros' 10-game home winning streak on July 13 via a 2–1 extra innings score. Spencer Arrighetti left with a 1–1 tie after six solid innings. Mauricio Dubón was ejected on the final out of the ninth inning after arguing a review that upheld that he was out at first base on a groundout. In the top of the tenth, Tayler Scott (6–3) surrendered an RBI single to Nathaniel Lowe for the deciding run. Though the Astros outhit the Rangers, 9–4, each team stranded at least 10 baserunners, including the Astros twice stranding the bases loaded.

The Astros had three players selected to the All-Star Game, played at Globe Life Field, including Jose Altuve, who extended his club-record ninth selection, and Yordan Alvarez and Kyle Tucker who both were selected for their third consecutive Mid-Summer Classic.

Behind six scoreless innings from Hunter Brown on July 19, the Astros (51–46) defeated the Seattle Mariners (52–47), 3–0, to take the AL West lead by a percentage point and for the first time on the season. Since his last start in April, Brown was 8–2, 2.55 ERA, and 1.12 WHIP in 14 games and 13 starts. Yainer Díaz hit a two-run single to lead the Astros' offense. With this win, the Astros evaporated a 10-game deficit to the then-first place Mariners in a span of 24 games, which was the quickest that large of a lead was eliminated in major league history, per the ESB.

==== Yordan Alvarez' cycle ====
On July 21, Álvarez hit for the cycle at T-Mobile Park, the first of his career, in a loss 6–4 to Seattle. It was the 11th cycle in franchise history and first since Altuve hit one August 28, 2023, versus Boston. Alvarez singled in the top of the first inning and connected for a home run (20) off Bryan Woo in the top of the fourth inning. In the top of the sixth inning, he tripled (2) off Taylor Saucedo, and doubled during the top of the eighth to complete the cycle. Alvarez went 4-for-4.

==== Rest of July ====
The Astros activated Victor Caratini from the IL on July 22.

On July 30, the Astros acquired starting pitcher Yusei Kikuchi from the Toronto Blue Jays in a trade for rookies Jake Bloss and Joey Loperfido and minor league prospect Will Wagner. On the same day, the Astros acquired left-handed relief pitcher Caleb Ferguson from the Yankees for minor league pitcher Kelly Austin.

In 6–2 a loss to the Pittsburgh Pirates on July 30, Yainer Díaz was 4-for-4 with a home run, his second career four-hit game. Over his previous 30 games, he had hit .374 with 46 hits and 24 RBI. On July 31, Dubón hit his first career pinch hit home run, a two-run home run the sixth inning to cap a 5–4 win over Pittsburgh. It was the Astros' second pinch-hit home run of the season, following Caratini's on April 30 vs the Guardians.

==== August ====
On August 2, Peña was announced as the Astros' nominee for the annual Heart & Hustle Award.

Later on August 2, trade deadline acquisition Yusei Kikuchi made his Astros debut versus Tampa Bay, which was notable in multiple ways. He became the first Japanese-born pitcher in club history to start a game. Second, he tied a franchise record with eight consecutive strikeouts, of which that streak ended on a full count walk to Yandy Díaz. (Note: Previously accomplished by Don Wilson (1968), Jim Deshaies (1986) and Justin Verlander (2022).) By tallying 11 total strikeouts, he had the most in an Astros debut since Gerrit Cole on April 1, 2018, and to that point, Kikuchi's total represented the season high for the staff. He exited after 5 2/3 innings and allowing three hits, two runs, and two walks in a contest the Astros held on to win, 3–2.

On August 3, outfielder Pedro León made his major league debut, collected a single versus Rays started Zack Littell in first at bat, and was thrown out by center fielder Jonny DeLuca attempting to stretch it into a double.

Tampa Bay pitching combined on a three-hit shut out of the Astros, 1–0, on August 4. Astros starter Spencer Arrighetti (4–10) struck out 12 of 23 batters faced while allowing the only run of the game over six innings to establish a new career-high in strikeouts as well as the season-high for the staff to that point. The 10th consecutive game that Astros pitching struck at least 10, that tied for a second-longest streak in major league history.

On August 6 at Globe Life Field, Alvarez connected for his 150th career home run to establish a franchise record by reaching the mark in 590 games. This eclipsed the effort in 133 fewer games accomplished by former teammate George Springer. Alvarez also became the eighth-fastest in major league history hit 150. A two-run home run, Alvarez hit it in the top of the ninth to give Houston a 4–0 lead over Texas. Meanwhile, Astros starter Framber Valdez came within one out of tossing his second career no-hitter. Corey Seager, representing Texas' final out, hit a two-run home against Valdez with two outs in the bottom of the ninth to make the score 4–2. Josh Hader relieved and got final out of the game to allow the Astros to secure the victory by the same score. Valdez also had had a perfect game going into the sixth until Jonah Heim reached on a Bregman throwing error. Prospect Zach Dezenzo made his major league debut on August 6, going 0-for-4 as the designated hitter.

On August 9, Jose Altuve hit his 224th career home run to pass Jimmy Wynn for fourth place all-time in Astros' history, which tied the game and catalyzed an 8–4 victory against the Boston Red Sox.

Spencer Arrighetti, Houston's starting pitcher for August 10, struck out 13 batters versus Boston. Following up the 12-strikeout performance versus Tampa Bay, he became the first American League rookie to strike out 12 batters each in consecutive starts. Hader closed out the game to convert his 25th consecutive save opportunity, surpassing Brad Lidge's franchise record. Dezenzo hit his first major league home run

Alvarez and Bregman were named AL co-Players of the Week for the week ended August 11, 2024. The pair combined to lead the Astros to 5 wins over 6 games over Boston and Texas; Bregman batted .444, 1.389 OPS, three doubles, three home runs, three walks, and six RBI. Alvarez hit .421 with a 1.777 OPS, five home runs, eight RBI, and seven BB. This was the second occurrence in club history with co-Players of the Week; on September 10, 2000, Richard Hidalgo and Julio Lugo shared the honors.

The Astros reached a season-high 8-game winning streak on August 14 by defeating the Tampa Bay Rays, 2–1, in 10 innings. Mauricio Dubón ended an 0-for-14 slump when he hit an RBI single up the middle in the top of the 10th. Jeremy Peña’s leadoff home run in the top of the fifth against Rays starter Zack Littell was the Astros' only other hit, marking the first time in club history they won in extra innings with fewer than three hits. The last time the Astros won a game with just two hits was on September 5, 2017.

During a during a pre-game ceremony at Minute Maid Park on August 17, the Astros inducted third baseman Ken Caminiti and broadcaster René Cárdenas into their team Hall of Fame. Making his major league debut on August 17, Shay Whitcomb authored two hits and one walk versus the Chicago White Sox, including a double in his first at bat versus Chris Flexen. Whitcomb started at third base in place of an injured Alex Bregman. Hunter Brown (11–7) allowed one run over seven innings to lead a 6–1 win.

The Astros overcame four errors on August 19 when Yainer Díaz hit his first career walk-off home run to secure a 5–4 victory over the Red Sox and win for the 11th time in 12 games. It was Díaz' first walk-off hit since July 24, 2023, versus the Rangers. On August 21, Justin Verlander (3–3) returned to the mound for his first major league start since June 9, pitched five innings and surrendered two runs as the Houston dropped the series finale to the Boston Red Sox, 4–1.

Waiver wire claim Ben Gamel made his Astros debut on August 22 and drove in his first two runs of the season with two hits and Whitcomb collected the first two RBI of his career off Corbin Burnes at Oriole Park at Camden Yards as the Astros won, 6–0. Arrgihetti started and tossed the first six innings, allowing just three hits.

In the finale versus Philadelphia on August 28, Arrighetti took a no-hitter into the eighth inning, Yordan Alvarez hit three home runs, and Jose Altuve stole home to lead a 10–0 win. Arrighetti tossed new career-high 7 2/3 innings with 11 strikeouts. Alvarez was 4-for-4 with a walk in his third career three-home-run game. Altuve stole home in the first, which was the Astros' first run. Alvarez joined Altuve as the only Astros with a three-home run game and hitting for the cycle in the same season (2023). It was Alvarez' first three-home run game since September 16, 2022, versus Oakland.

On August 29, outfielder Jason Heyward hit a key two-run double in the eighth inning of his Astros debut, Zach Dezenzo drew a bases-loaded walk and Mauricio Dubón followed Dezenzo with a two-run single to spearhead a 6–3 comeback win versus the Kansas City Royals. The following day, Framber Valdez departed after 7 no-hit innings versus Kansas City; however, the no-hit bid was lost when Bryan Abreu allowed a single in the eighth inning to pinch hitter Kyle Isbel. Josh Hader allowed a game-tying two-run home run at 2–2 to Paul DeJong in the top of the ninth. In the bottom of the ninth, Jose Altuve hit a walk-off double that scored Jake Meyers for a 3–2 win, making Hader (7–7) the winning pitcher. The DeJong home run ended Hader's streak of consecutive saves at 29, thus establishing the Astros' franchise record.

The Astros' pitching staff combined for an MLB-best 2.51 ERA for the month of August, and their .185 batting average against (BAA) was the second-lowest for one month by any team in major league history. They also set a team record for strikeouts (291) for the month of August. Accordingly, two Astros were recognized with monthly awards: Spencer Arrighetti as AL Rookie of the Month, and Josh Hader as AL Reliever of the Month. Arrighetti posted a 1.95 ERA, 0.90 walks plus hits per inning pitched (WHIP), and 47 strikeouts over 32 1/3 innings. Hader, meanwhile, surrendered 1 earned run over 13 1/3 innings (0.68 ERA), 0.60 WHIP and .071 BAA.

==== September ====
On September 1, Yordan Alvarez hit two home runs and Jon Singleton hit another home run to back Ronel Blanco (10–6) in 5 shutout innings the Astros took the finale, 7–2, and four-game sweep. Alvarez joined Jeff Bagwell (Note: Eight total, from 1996–2003.) as the only Astros with four or more consecutive 30 home runs seasons. Yuli Gurriel—the 2021 AL batting champion and Gold Glover and a key member of the Astros' playoff runs from 2017–22—made his 2024 debut at Minute Maid Park as the Royals' designated hitter, and had an RBI single in the sixth inning versus Tayler Scott.

Arrigehetti (7–12) allowed nine runs to the Cincinnati Reds in 2/3 inning on September 4 that led to an eventual 12–5 Astros loss at Great American Ball Park. On September 5, the Reds swept the Astros to improve to nine straight wins between the two clubs, led by Ty France's 9-for-11 effort in the series. After Hunter Brown allowed four hits over six innings in the series finale, Bryan Abreu (2–3) served up the game-winning home run—and only run—to France in the seventh inning, leading to a 1–0 score. Joe Espada was ejected for the fourth time after arguing a strikeout with call against a hit-by-pitch of Alex Bregman in the same at bat.

On September 6, Alvarez hit a pair of three-run home runs and Framber Valdez (14–6) hurled seven two-hit shutout innings against the Arizona Diamondbacks to lead an 8–0 win over the major leagues' top-scoring offense. His seventh multi-home run game of the season, Alvarez tied Chris Carter for the club record, set in 2014. Kyle Tucker drew a walk and was hit by a pitch in his first game back since fouling a ball off his shin on June 3.

Jon Singleton hit his first career triple on September 10 versus Oakland, which drove in a run, and led to his hit representing a second run. Bryan Abreu struck out a career-high five in two innings of work as the A's outlasted the Astros, 4–3. The Astros salvaged the finale of the three-game series versus Oakland, 6–3, led by Valdez' one run allowed over 6 1/3 innings, Jason Heyward's first home run as a member of the Astros, and Singeton's three hits, including two doubles, and an RBI.

Tucker was announced on September 11 as the Astros' nominee for the 2024 Roberto Clemente Award, whose foundation assists those in hospice care and children with cancer diagnoses.

On September 13, the Astros secured the 5,000th win in franchise history with a 5–3 victory over the Los Angeles Angels. Yusei Kikuchi (9–9, 5–0 with Houston) was the winning pitcher; Houston thus far remained unbeaten in the eight games started by Kikuchi. Alex Bregman (23) and Yordan Alvarez (33) both homered for Houston. Josh Hader recorded his 30th save, reaching the milestone for a fourth consecutive season.

The Astros placed Gamel on the 10-day IL on September 17, retroactive to September 15, with fractured left fibula. Originally left out of the lineup on the basis of a left knee contusion, he sustained the injury after running into the outfield wall to make a catch in Anaheim. As a member of the Astros, Gamel slashed 259/.377/.362 over 20 games.

Starter Dylan Cease pitched into the ninth on September 18 for the San Diego Padres to outduel seven strong innings from Framber Valdez, and Astros reliever Kaleb Ort allowed three consecutive home runs without recording an out to hand the Astros a 4–1 loss. The three home runs were hit in the eighth by Manny Machado, Fernando Tatís Jr., and Donovan Solano. Valdez (14–7) allowed one run in his outing. Cease (14–11) retired his first 15 batters faced until Jason Heyward led off the sixth with a single and continued into the ninth having allowed only Heyward's hit. Mauricio Dubón raced to get an infield single and Jose Altuve reached on an error on a ground ball. Closer Tanner Scott took over for Cease; however, he got the final two outs to complete the save (21) and Padres' two-hitter. Astros setup man Bryan Abreu logged his 100th strikeout, a second consecutive season with the total. He joined Octavio Dotel (2001–02) Lidge (3 consecutive, 2004–06) as the only relievers to achieve such seasons consecutively as members of the Astros.

In Kikuchi's start on September 19, he allowed five hits, one run and struck out nine over six innings as the Astros defeated Los Angeles, 5–3. The ninth win for the club in his first nine starts, that set a franchise record, surpassing eight consecutive team wins to start their Astros careers shared by Roy Oswalt (2001) and Verlander (2018). It was the longest such streak in the major leagues since John Burkett with the 2002 Boston Red Sox.

The Astros placed RHP Tayler Scott on the 15-day IL due to thoracic spine strain. Through the point of the roster move, Scott had made the third-most appearances for the Astros and had produced a 2.23 ERA, 25.2% strikeout rate, and 3.5% barrel rate over his 68 2/3 innings. He did struggle with walks, however, at 12.4%.

On September 21, the Astros racked a season-high 20 hits to drive a 10–4 win over the Angels. Led by Yordan Alvarez and Kyle Tucker amassing four hits and a home run apiece, starter Ronel Blanco's hurled a sublime six-inning effort. Batting 2nd and 3rd respectively, each of Alverez' and Tucker's hits occurred successively as replicated hit types, including two singles, a double, and a home run. In the seventh inning, the pair went deep, the seventh time on the season that the Astros hit back-to-back home runs. Víctor Caratini hit a three-run home in the fourth inning, to break open the game. Jake Meyers was 2-for-3 with a double, two walks, and a stolen base. Blanco (12–6) allowed two runs and seven hits over six innings while getting nine strikeouts. Tucker's four-hit game was his second consecutive, making him the 14th Astro to accomplish the feat, and first since Michael Brantley on July 5–7, 2019.

The Astros clinched the AL West division title on September 24 with a 4–3 victory over Seattle, their seventh division title over the past eight seasons and seventh overall in the AL West, and 14th in franchise history. (Note: The other seven included three as members of the National League West division (1980, 1981, 1986), and four as members of the National League Central division (1997–1999, 2001).) Their fourth consecutive division title, that represented longest streak in the AL West since the 1971–1975 Oakland Athletics, who won three consecutive World Series in 1972, 1973, and 1974.

Ronel Blanco, in his final regular season start, allowed one hit in five innings versus Cleveland to lead a 5–2 win. He remained unbeaten in his final nine starts of the season and posted a 0.75 ERA in four September starts. The Astros, after a 7–19 start in April, had gone 80–54 following for the second-best record in the majors over that span.

==== Performance overview ====
From July 31 through the end of the season, Astros starting pitching led the majors in innings pitched (299 1/3) and were second in ERA (3.07).

Ronel Blanco, who was named the BBWAA Houston Astros' Pitcher of the Year, led the AL in batting average against (.190), but also surrendered the highest base on balls percentage (10.1%) among qualified pitchers. Framber Valdez allowed the highest hard-hit percentage (45.6%), the 8th-highest exit velocity (89.9 mph), induced the fourth-lowest OPS against (.610), and the highest ground ball rate (59.8%); Hunter Brown was fifth at 48.3%. Brown surrendered both the lowest exit velocity (86.0 mph) and hard-hit rate (30.3%), and was eighth in home run rate (2.5%) and ninth in strikeout rate (25.1%).

Left-hander Josh Hader became the 12th major league reliever to attain 100 or more strikeouts over four seasons. (Note: The record was five, attained by Rich Gossage, Rollie Fingers, Aroldis Chapman, and Dellin Betances. Criteria: Number of seasons player meets criteria, up to 2024, at least 80% games in relief, in the regular season, requiring strikeouts ≥ 100, sorted by descending instances.)

=== League standings ===
==== American League West ====
AL West
Team	W	L	Pct.	GB	Home	Road
Houston Astros	88	73	.547	—	46‍–‍35	42‍–‍38
Seattle Mariners	85	77	.525	3½	49‍–‍32	36‍–‍45
Texas Rangers	78	84	.481	10½	44‍–‍37	34‍–‍47
Oakland Athletics	69	93	.426	19½	38‍–‍43	31‍–‍50
Los Angeles Angels	63	99	.389	25½	32‍–‍49	31‍–‍50

==== American League Wild Card ====
AL Wild Card standings

Division leaders
Team	W	L	Pct.
New York Yankees	94	68	.580
Cleveland Guardians	92	69	.571
Houston Astros	88	73	.547

Wild Card teams (Top 3 teams qualify for postseason)
Team	W	L	Pct.	GB
Baltimore Orioles	91	71	.562	+5
Kansas City Royals	86	76	.531	—
Detroit Tigers	86	76	.531	—
Seattle Mariners	85	77	.525	1
Minnesota Twins	82	80	.506	4
Boston Red Sox	81	81	.500	5
Tampa Bay Rays	80	82	.494	6
Texas Rangers	78	84	.481	8
Toronto Blue Jays	74	88	.457	12
Oakland Athletics	69	93	.426	17
Los Angeles Angels	63	99	.389	23
Chicago White Sox	41	121	.253	45

==== Record versus opponents ====
American League

2024 American League record Source: MLB Standings Grid – 2024
Team	BAL	BOS	CWS	CLE	DET	HOU	KC	LAA	MIN	NYY	OAK	SEA	TB	TEX	TOR	NL
Baltimore	—	8–5	6–1	3–4	2–4	2–5	4–2	4–2	6–0	8–5	3–3	4–2	9–4	5–2	7–6	20–26
Boston	5–8	—	4–3	2–5	3–4	2–4	4–2	4–2	3–3	6–7	5–1	4–3	6–7	4–2	8–5	21–25
Chicago	1–6	3–4	—	5–8	3–10	2–4	1–12	4–2	1–12	1–5	3–3	1–6	4–2	0–7	1–5	11–35
Cleveland	4–3	5–2	8–5	—	7–6	1–4	5–8	5–1	10–3	2–4	6–1	4–2	3–4	4–2	4–2	24–22
Detroit	4–2	4–3	10–3	6–7	—	2–4	6–7	3–4	6–7	2–4	3–3	5–1	5–1	3–4	5–2	22–24
Houston	5–2	4–2	4–2	4–1	4–2	—	4–3	9–4	2–4	1–6	8–5	5–8	4–2	7–6	5–2	22–24
Kansas City	2–4	2–4	12–1	8–5	7–6	3–4	—	5–2	6–7	2–5	4–2	3–3	3–3	1–5	5–2	23–23
Los Angeles	2–4	2–4	2–4	1–5	4–3	4–9	2–5	—	1–5	3–3	5–8	8–5	3–4	4–9	0–7	22–24
Minnesota	0–6	3–3	12–1	3–10	7–6	4–2	7–6	5–1	—	0–6	6–1	5–2	3–4	5–2	4–2	18–28
New York	5–8	7–6	5–1	4–2	4–2	6–1	5–2	3–3	6–0	—	5–2	4–3	7–6	3–3	7–6	23–23
Oakland	3–3	1–5	3–3	1–6	3–3	5–8	2–4	8–5	1–6	2–5	—	4–9	3–4	6–7	3–3	24–22
Seattle	2–4	3–4	6–1	2–4	1–5	8–5	3–3	5–8	2–5	3–4	9–4	—	3–3	10–3	2–4	26–20
Tampa Bay	4–9	7–6	2–4	4–3	1–5	2–4	3–3	4–3	4–3	6–7	4–3	3–3	—	1–5	9–4	26–20
Texas	2–5	2–4	7–0	2–4	4–3	6–7	5–1	9–4	2–5	3–3	7–6	3–10	5–1	—	2–4	19–27
Toronto	6–7	5–8	5–1	2–4	2–5	2–5	2–5	7–0	2–4	6–7	3–3	4–2	4–9	4–2	—	20–26

Updated with the results of all games through September 30, 2024.
National League

2024 American League record vs. National League Source: MLB Standings
Team	AZ	ATL	CHC	CIN	COL	LAD	MIA	MIL	NYM	PHI	PIT	SD	SF	STL	WSH
Baltimore	2–1	2–1	0–3	3–0	2–1	1–2	1–2	1–2	1–2	2–1	1–2	1–2	1–2	0–3	2–2
Boston	0–3	1–3	2–1	2–1	1–2	0–3	3–0	1–2	0–3	2–1	3–0	1–2	2–1	1–2	2–1
Chicago	1–2	2–1	0–4	0–3	2–1	0–3	1–2	0–3	0–3	0–3	0–3	0–3	1–2	2–1	2–1
Cleveland	0–3	1–2	3–0	3–1	1–2	1–2	2–1	0–3	3–0	2–1	2–1	1–2	2–1	1–2	2–1
Detroit	2–1	0–3	1–2	3–0	2–1	2–1	1–2	1–2	2–1	1–2	2–2	1–2	1–2	2–1	1–2
Houston	2–1	0–3	0–3	0–3	4–0	2–1	3–0	2–1	2–1	1–2	1–2	1–2	1–2	2–1	1–2
Kansas City	1–2	1–2	1–2	3–0	1–2	1–2	2–1	2–1	1–2	1–2	2–1	1–2	0–3	3–1	3–0
Los Angeles	1–2	1–2	1–2	0–3	1–2	2–2	3–0	1–2	2–1	1–2	2–1	3–0	2–1	1–2	1–2
Minnesota	2–1	0–3	1–2	1–2	2–1	1–2	1–2	1–3	1–2	2–1	1–2	1–2	1–2	1–2	2–1
New York	2–1	1–2	2–1	0–3	2–1	1–2	2–1	2–1	0–4	3–0	1–2	2–1	3–0	1–2	1–2
Oakland	1–2	1–2	2–1	2–1	2–1	1–2	2–1	1–2	2–1	2–1	3–0	0–3	2–2	1–2	2–1
Seattle	2–1	2–1	1–2	3–0	2–1	0–3	1–2	1–2	3–0	2–1	1–2	3–1	2–1	2–1	1–2
Tampa Bay	3–0	1–2	2–1	2–1	2–1	1–2	3–1	1–2	3–0	0–3	2–1	1–2	2–1	1–2	2–1
Texas	2–2	1–2	2–1	2–1	0–3	2–1	2–1	0–3	1–2	0–3	2–1	1–2	1–2	1–2	2–1
Toronto	1–2	1–2	1–2	1–2	2–1	1–2	0–3	1–2	1–2	1–3	2–1	2–1	2–1	3–0	1–2

Updated with the results of all games through September 30, 2024.

== Game log ==
=== Regular season ===
Past games legend
Astros Win (#bfb)	Astros Loss (#fbb)	Game postponed (#bbb)	Clinched Division (#090)
Bold denotes an Astros pitcher

Future Games Legend
Home Game	Away Game

2024 Game Log
Total: 88–73 (Home: 46–35; Away: 42–38)
March/April: 10–19 (Home: 5–9; Away: 5–10)

#	Date	Opponent	Score	Win	Loss	Save	Location	Attendance	Record
1	March 28	Yankees	L 4–5	Loáisiga (1–0)	**Pressly** (0–1)	Holmes (1)	**Minute Maid Park**	42,642	0–1
2	March 29	Yankees	L 1–7	Weaver (1–0)	**Scott** (0–1)	—	**Minute Maid Park**	41,583	0–2
3	March 30	Yankees	L 3–5	Stroman (1–0)	**Abreu** (0–1)	Holmes (2)	**Minute Maid Park**	41,247	0–3
4	March 31	Yankees	L 3–4	Burdi (1–0)	**Hader** (0–1)	Holmes (3)	**Minute Maid Park**	36,908	0–4
5	April 1	Blue Jays	**W** 10–0	**Blanco** (1–0)	Francis (0–1)	—	**Minute Maid Park**	27,285	1–4
6	April 2	Blue Jays	L 1–2	Green (1–0)	**Hader** (0–2)	—	**Minute Maid Park**	28,811	1–5
7	April 3	Blue Jays	**W** 8–0	**Javier** (1–0)	Bassitt (0–2)	—	**Minute Maid Park**	26,279	2–5
8	April 5	@ Rangers	L 2–10	Bradford (2–0)	**Brown** (0–1)	—	Globe Life Field	34,583	2–6
9	April 6	@ Rangers	L 2–7	Yates (1–0)	**France** (0–1)	Leclerc (1)	Globe Life Field	39,594	2–7
10	April 7	@ Rangers	**W** 3–1	**Blanco** (2–0)	Dunning (1–1)	**Hader** (1)	Globe Life Field	35,681	3–7
11	April 8	@ Rangers	**W** 10–5	**Martinez** (1–0)	Heaney (0–2)	—	Globe Life Field	31,737	4–7
12	April 9	@ Royals	L 3–4 (10)	McArthur (1–0)	**Suero** (0–1)	—	Kauffman Stadium	11,926	4–8
13	April 10	@ Royals	L 2–11	Lugo (2–0)	**Arrighetti** (0–1)	—	Kauffman Stadium	10,536	4–9
14	April 11	@ Royals	L 3–13	Singer (2–0)	**Brown** (0–2)	—	Kauffman Stadium	10,280	4–10
15	April 12	Rangers	L 8–12	Dunning (2–1)	**France** (0–2)	—	**Minute Maid Park**	39,842	4–11
16	April 13	Rangers	**W** 9–2	**Abreu** (1–1)	Ureña (0–1)	—	**Minute Maid Park**	38,574	5–11
17	April 14	Rangers	**W** 8–5	**Javier** (2–0)	Eovaldi (1–1)	—	**Minute Maid Park**	36,759	6–11
18	April 15	Braves	L 1–6	Bummer (1–1)	**Arrighetti** (0–2)	—	**Minute Maid Park**	32,407	6–12
19	April 16	Braves	L 2–6	López (2–0)	**Brown** (0–3)	Iglesias (4)	**Minute Maid Park**	34,144	6–13
20	April 17	Braves	L 4–5 (10)	Minter (3–1)	**Martinez** (1–1)	Iglesias (5)	**Minute Maid Park**	29,073	6–14
21	April 19	@ Nationals	**W** 5–3	**Verlander** (1–0)	Gore (2–1)	**Hader** (2)	Nationals Park	22,999	7–14
22	April 20	@ Nationals	L 4–5 (10)	Finnegan (1–2)	**Martinez** (1–2)	—	Nationals Park	34,608	7–15
23	April 21	@ Nationals	L 0–6	Parker (2–0)	**Brown** (0–4)	—	Nationals Park	23,193	7–16
24	April 23	@ Cubs	L 2–7	Wicks (1–2)	**France** (0–3)	Almonte (1)	Wrigley Field	30,643	7–17
25	April 24	@ Cubs	L 3–4	Taillon (2–0)	**Arrighetti** (0–3)	Neris (2)	Wrigley Field	32,327	7–18
26	April 25	@ Cubs	L 1–3	Wesneski (2–0)	**Montero** (0–1)	Neris (3)	Wrigley Field	29,876	7–19
27	April 27*	@ Rockies	**W** 12–4	**Blanco** (3–0)	Quantrill (0–3)	—	Alfredo Harp Helú Stadium	19,934	8–19
28	April 28*	@ Rockies	**W** 8–2	**Valdez** (1–0)	Gomber (0–2)	—	Alfredo Harp Helú Stadium	19,841	9–19
29	April 30	Guardians	**W** 10–9 (10)	**Hader** (1–2)	Gaddis (1–1)	—	**Minute Maid Park**	29,711	10–19
*April 27 and 28 games played at Estadio Alfredo Harp Helú in Mexico City, Mexico

May: 15–14 (Home: 9–7; Away: 6–7)

#	Date	Opponent	Score	Win	Loss	Save	Location	Attendance	Record
30	May 1	Guardians	L 2–3 (10)	Smith (1–0)	**Dubin** (0–1)	Clase (9)	**Minute Maid Park**	25,733	10–20
31	May 2	Guardians	**W** 8–2	**Scott** (1–1)	Allen (3–2)	—	**Minute Maid Park**	26,600	11–20
32	May 3	Mariners	**W** 5–3	**Martinez** (2–2)	Speier (0–1)	**Hader** (3)	**Minute Maid Park**	33,796	12–20
33	May 4	Mariners	L 0–5	Gilbert (3–0)	**Valdez** (1–1)	—	**Minute Maid Park**	34,205	12–21
34	May 5	Mariners	L 4–5	Muñoz (2–2)	**Hader** (1–3)	—	**Minute Maid Park**	36,280	12–22
35	May 7	@ Yankees	L 3–10	Gil (3–1)	**Verlander** (1–1)	—	Yankee Stadium	37,126	12–23
36	May 8	@ Yankees	L 4–9	Rodón (3–2)	**Arrighetti** (0–4)	—	Yankee Stadium	37,660	12–24
37	May 9	@ Yankees	**W** 4–3	**Blanco** (4–0)	Stroman (2–2)	**Hader** (4)	Yankee Stadium	38,095	13–24
38	May 10	@ Tigers	**W** 5–2	**Valdez** (2–1)	Chafin (2–1)	**Hader** (5)	Comerica Park	21,215	14–24
39	May 11	@ Tigers	L 2–8	Skubal (5–0)	**Javier** (2–1)	—	Comerica Park	27,140	14–25
40	May 12	@ Tigers	**W** 9–3	**Verlander** (2–1)	Flaherty (0–3)	—	Comerica Park	27,004	15–25
41	May 13	Athletics	**W** 9–2	**Arrighetti** (1–4)	Stripling (1–7)	—	**Minute Maid Park**	26,225	16–25
42	May 14	Athletics	**W** 2–1 (10)	**Hader** (2–3)	Kelly (2–1)	—	**Minute Maid Park**	36,178	17–25
43	May 15	Athletics	**W** 3–0	**Valdez** (3–1)	Brooks (0–1)	**Martinez** (1)	**Minute Maid Park**	28,124	18–25
44	May 16	Athletics	**W** 8–1	**Javier** (3–1)	Estes (1–1)	**Dubin** (1)	**Minute Maid Park**	26,377	19–25
45	May 17	Brewers	**W** 5–4	**Brown** (1–4)	Peralta (3–2)	**Hader** (6)	**Minute Maid Park**	31,334	20–25
46	May 18	Brewers	L 2–4	Milner (2–0)	**Verlander** (2–2)	Megill (6)	**Minute Maid Park**	34,212	20–26
47	May 19	Brewers	**W** 9–4	**Arrighetti** (2–4)	Rea (3–2)	—	**Minute Maid Park**	34,045	21–26
48	May 20	Angels	L 7–9	Suárez (1–0)	**Valdez** (3–2)	Estévez (7)	**Minute Maid Park**	29,821	21–27
49	May 21	Angels	**W** 6–5 (10)	**Hader** (3–3)	Estévez (0–3)	—	**Minute Maid Park**	30,891	22–27
50	May 22	Angels	L 1–2	Anderson (5–4)	**Brown** (1–5)	García (3)	**Minute Maid Park**	30,599	22–28
51	May 24	@ Athletics	**W** 6–3	**Verlander** (3–2)	Stripling (1–9)	**Hader** (7)	Oakland Coliseum	9,676	23–28
52	May 25	@ Athletics	L 1–3	Sears (4–3)	**Arrighetti** (2–5)	Miller (10)	Oakland Coliseum	10,617	23–29
53	May 26	@ Athletics	**W** 5–2	**Blanco** (5–0)	Brooks (0–2)	—	Oakland Coliseum	10,927	24–29
54	May 27	@ Mariners	L 2–3	Miller (4–5)	**Valdez** (3–3)	Muñoz (11)	T-Mobile Park	23,814	24–30
55	May 28	@ Mariners	L 2–4	Saucedo (2–0)	**Pressly** (0–2)	Stanek (3)	T-Mobile Park	17,701	24–31
56	May 29	@ Mariners	L 1–2 (10)	Baumann (2–0)	**Scott** (1–2)	—	T-Mobile Park	25,437	24–32
57	May 30	@ Mariners	**W** 4–0	**Arrighetti** (3–5)	Gilbert (3–3)	—	T-Mobile Park	25,527	25–32
58	May 31	Twins	L 1–6	López (5–5)	**Blanco** (5–1)	—	**Minute Maid Park**	36,903	25–33

June: 17–8 (Home: 10–3; Away: 7–5)

#	Date	Opponent	Score	Win	Loss	Save	Location	Attendance	Record
59	June 1	Twins	**W** 5–2	**Valdez** (4–3)	Ryan (4–4)	**Hader** (8)	**Minute Maid Park**	33,855	26–33
60	June 2	Twins	L 3–4	Okert (2–0)	**Pressly** (0–3)	Durán (10)	**Minute Maid Park**	34,242	26–34
61	June 3	Cardinals	**W** 7–4	**Montero** (1–1)	Romero (2–1)	**Hader** (9)	**Minute Maid Park**	33,638	27–34
62	June 4	Cardinals	**W** 8–5	**Scott** (2–2)	Pallante (1–2)	**Pressly** (1)	**Minute Maid Park**	33,468	28–34
63	June 5	Cardinals	L 2–4	Mikolas (4–6)	**Blanco** (5–2)	Helsley (20)	**Minute Maid Park**	32,047	28–35
64	June 7	@ Angels	**W** 7–1	**Valdez** (5–3)	Canning (2–6)	—	Angel Stadium	36,534	29–35
65	June 8	@ Angels	**W** 6–1	**Brown** (2–5)	Anderson (5–6)	—	Angel Stadium	38,217	30–35
66	June 9	@ Angels	L 7–9	Estévez (1–3)	**Hader** (3–4)	—	Angel Stadium	42,703	30–36
67	June 10	@ Giants	L 3–4 (10)	Rodríguez (2–1)	**Montero** (1–2)	—	Oracle Park	32,820	30–37
68	June 11	@ Giants	**W** 3–1	**Blanco** (6–2)	Hicks (4–3)	**Pressly** (2)	Oracle Park	32,853	31–37
69	June 12	@ Giants	L 3–5	Webb (5–3)	**Valdez** (5–4)	Doval (12)	Oracle Park	34,506	31–38
70	June 14	Tigers	**W** 4–0	**Brown** (3–5)	Skubal (8–2)	—	**Minute Maid Park**	36,902	32–38
71	June 15	Tigers	L 5–13	Flaherty (4–4)	**Arrighetti** (3–6)	—	**Minute Maid Park**	37,675	32–39
72	June 16	Tigers	**W** 4–1	**Blanco** (7–2)	Maeda (2–3)	—	**Minute Maid Park**	39,199	33–39
73	June 18	@ White Sox	L 0–2	Cannon (1–1)	**Valdez** (5–5)	Brebbia (2)	Guaranteed Rate Field	16,763	33–40
74	June 19	@ White Sox	**W** 4–1	**Brown** (4–5)	Crochet (6–6)	**Hader** (10)	Guaranteed Rate Field	14,124	34–40
75	June 20	@ White Sox	**W** 5–3	**Scott** (3–2)	Wilson (1–4)	**Hader** (11)	Guaranteed Rate Field	14,435	35–40
76	June 21	Orioles	**W** 14–11	**Dubin** (1–1)	Rodriguez (8–3)	**Abreu** (1)	**Minute Maid Park**	38,596	36–40
77	June 22	Orioles	**W** 5–1	**Blanco** (8–2)	Burnes (8–3)	—	**Minute Maid Park**	37,107	37–40
78	June 23	Orioles	**W** 8–1	**Valdez** (6–5)	Suárez (3–2)	—	**Minute Maid Park**	37,014	38–40
79	June 25	Rockies	**W** 5–2	**Brown** (5–5)	Gomber (1–5)	—	**Minute Maid Park**	35,976	39–40
80	June 26	Rockies	**W** 7–1	**Arrighetti** (4–6)	Feltner (1–7)	—	**Minute Maid Park**	33,603	40–40
81	June 28	@ Mets	L 2–7	Núñez (2–0)	**Blanco** (8–3)	—	Citi Field	32,465	40–41
82	June 29	@ Mets	**W** 9–6	**Martinez** (3–2)	Garrett (7–3)	**Hader** (12)	Citi Field	32,438	41–41
83	June 30	@ Mets	**W** 10–5 (11)	**Scott** (4–2)	Festa (0–1)	—	Citi Field	26,853	42–41

July: 14–11 (Home: 7–5; Away: 7–6)

#	Date	Opponent	Score	Win	Loss	Save	Location	Attendance	Record
84	July 1	@ Blue Jays	**W** 3–1	**Brown** (6–5)	Rodríguez (0–3)	**Hader** (13)	Rogers Centre	39,265	43–41
85	July 2	@ Blue Jays	L 6–7	Berríos (8–6)	**Arrighetti** (4–7)	Green (3)	Rogers Centre	26,308	43–42
86	July 3	@ Blue Jays	**W** 9–2	**Scott** (5–2)	Pop (0–3)	—	Rogers Centre	28,570	44–42
87	July 4	@ Blue Jays	**W** 5–3	**Valdez** (7–5)	Bassitt (7–7)	**Hader** (14)	Rogers Centre	38,234	45–42
88	July 5	@ Twins	**W** 13–12	**King** (1–0)	López (8–7)	**Hader** (15)	Target Field	28,129	46–42
89	July 6	@ Twins	L 3–9	Ryan (6–5)	**Brown** (6–6)	—	Target Field	31,431	46–43
90	July 7	@ Twins	L 2–3	Durán (4–3)	**Hader** (3–5)	—	Target Field	28,056	46–44
91	July 9	Marlins	**W** 4–3	**Blanco** (9–3)	Brazobán (1–2)	**Hader** (16)	**Minute Maid Park**	34,776	47–44
92	July 10	Marlins	**W** 9–1	**Valdez** (8–5)	Hoeing (0–2)	—	**Minute Maid Park**	32,715	48–44
93	July 11	Marlins	**W** 6–3	**Scott** (6–2)	Muñoz (1–4)	**Hader** (17)	**Minute Maid Park**	38,818	49–44
94	July 12	Rangers	**W** 6–3	**Brown** (7–6)	Heaney (3–10)	**Hader** (18)	**Minute Maid Park**	39,666	50–44
95	July 13	Rangers	L 1–2 (10)	Robertson (3–3)	**Scott** (6–3)	Yates (15)	**Minute Maid Park**	42,094	50–45
96	July 14	Rangers	L 2–4	Sborz (2–0)	**Blanco** (9–4)	Yates (16)	**Minute Maid Park**	38,622	50–46
**94th All-Star Game in Arlington, Texas**
97	July 19	@ Mariners	**W** 3–0	**Brown** (8–6)	Castillo (8–10)	**Hader** (19)	T-Mobile Park	40,948	51–46
98	July 20	@ Mariners	**W** 4–2	**Scott** (7–3)	Stanek (6–3)	**Hader** (20)	T-Mobile Park	38,017	52–46
99	July 21	@ Mariners	L 4–6	Woo (4–1)	**Blanco** (9–5)	Muñoz (16)	T-Mobile Park	35,038	52–47
100	July 22	@ Athletics	L 0–4	Harris (2–3)	**Arrighetti** (4–8)	—	Oakland Coliseum	4,517	52–48
101	July 23	@ Athletics	L 2–8	Bido (2–1)	**Bloss** (0–1)	—	Oakland Coliseum	5,896	52–49
102	July 24	@ Athletics	**W** 8–1	**Brown** (9–6)	Sears (7–8)	—	Oakland Coliseum	14,978	53–49
103	July 26	Dodgers	**W** 5–0	**Valdez** (9–5)	Stone (9–4)	—	**Minute Maid Park**	41,452	54–49
104	July 27	Dodgers	**W** 7–6	**Hader** (4–5)	Treinen (5–3)	—	**Minute Maid Park**	41,819	55–49
105	July 28	Dodgers	L 2–6	Ryan (1–0)	**Arrighetti** (4–9)	—	**Minute Maid Park**	41,418	55–50
106	July 29	Pirates	L 3–5	Chapman (4–4)	**Hader** (4–6)	Bednar (19)	**Minute Maid Park**	40,522	55–51
107	July 30	Pirates	L 2–6	Falter (5–7)	**Brown** (9–7)	—	**Minute Maid Park**	37,518	55–52
108	July 31	Pirates	**W** 5–4	**Valdez** (10–5)	Holderman (3–2)	**Hader** (21)	**Minute Maid Park**	30,038	56–52

August: 18–10 (Home: 7–5; Away: 11–5)

#	Date	Opponent	Score	Win	Loss	Save	Location	Attendance	Record
109	August 2	Rays	**W** 3–2	**Abreu** (2–1)	Kelly (3–2)	**Hader** (22)	**Minute Maid Park**	33,430	57–52
110	August 3	Rays	L 1–6	Littell (5–7)	**Blanco** (9–6)	—	**Minute Maid Park**	37,328	57–53
111	August 4	Rays	L 0–1	Alexander (5–3)	**Arrighetti** (4–10)	Fairbanks (21)	**Minute Maid Park**	35,205	57–54
112	August 5	@ Rangers	L 3–4 (10)	Yates (4–1)	**Ferguson** (1–4)	—	Globe Life Field	31,605	57–55
113	August 6	@ Rangers	**W** 4–2	**Valdez** (11–5)	Mahle (0–1)	**Hader** (23)	Globe Life Field	34,458	58–55
114	August 7	@ Rangers	**W** 6–4	**Kikuchi** (5–9)	Ureña (3–7)	**Hader** (24)	Globe Life Field	33,181	59–55
115	August 9	@ Red Sox	**W** 8–4	**Ort** (1–0)	Sims (1–5)	—	Fenway Park	32,898	60–55
116	August 10	@ Red Sox	**W** 5–4	**Arrighetti** (5–10)	Keller (0–3)	**Hader** (25)	Fenway Park	35,443	61–55
117	August 11	@ Red Sox	**W** 10–2	**Brown** (10–7)	Sims (1–6)	—	Fenway Park	31,762	62–55
118	August 12	@ Rays	**W** 6–1	**Valdez** (12–5)	Bradley (6–7)	—	Tropicana Field	10,540	63–55
119	August 13	@ Rays	**W** 3–2	**Kikuchi** (6–9)	Baz (0–2)	**Hader** (26)	Tropicana Field	12,275	64–55
120	August 14	@ Rays	**W** 2–1 (10)	**Hader** (5–6)	Cleavinger (7–3)	—	Tropicana Field	12,493	65–55
121	August 16	White Sox	L 4–5	Anderson (1–0)	**Arrighetti** (5–11)	Kuhl (1)	**Minute Maid Park**	37,307	65–56
122	August 17	White Sox	**W** 6–1	**Brown** (11–7)	Flexen (2–12)	—	**Minute Maid Park**	37,008	66–56
123	August 18	White Sox	**W** 2–0	**Valdez** (13–5)	Bush (0–2)	**Hader** (27)	**Minute Maid Park**	37,169	67–56
124	August 19	Red Sox	**W** 5–4	**Hader** (6–6)	Jansen (3–2)	—	**Minute Maid Park**	33,409	68–56
125	August 20	Red Sox	L 5–6	Kelly (5–2)	**Ort** (1–1)	Jansen (24)	**Minute Maid Park**	34,436	68–57
126	August 21	Red Sox	L 1–4	Winckowski (4–1)	**Verlander** (3–3)	Martin (1)	**Minute Maid Park**	31,954	68–58
127	August 22	@ Orioles	**W** 6–0	**Arrighetti** (6–11)	Burnes (12–6)	—	Camden Yards	22,212	69–58
128	August 23	@ Orioles	L 5–7	Kimbrel (7–4)	**Abreu** (2–2)	Domínguez (5)	Camden Yards	39,578	69–59
129	August 24	@ Orioles	L 2–3	Akin (3–0)	**Valdez** (13–6)	Domínguez (6)	Camden Yards	35,302	69–60
130	August 25	@ Orioles	**W** 6–3	**Neris** (9–4)	Smith (4–1)	**Hader** (28)	Camden Yards	21,654	70–60
131	August 26	@ Phillies	L 2–3 (10)	Strahm (6–2)	**Hader** (6–7)	—	Citizens Bank Park	39,627	70–61
132	August 27	@ Phillies	L 0–5	Nola (12–6)	**Verlander** (3–4)	—	Citizens Bank Park	39,373	70–62
133	August 28	@ Phillies	**W** 10–0	**Arrighetti** (7–11)	Walker (3–6)	—	Citizens Bank Park	37,778	71–62
134	August 29	Royals	**W** 6–3	**Pressly** (1–3)	Erceg (2–5)	**Hader** (29)	**Minute Maid Park**	32,070	72–62
135	August 30	Royals	**W** 3–2	**Hader** (7–7)	McArthur (5–6)	—	**Minute Maid Park**	37,279	73–62
136	August 31	Royals	**W** 5–2	**Kikuchi** (7–9)	Ragans (10–9)	**Pressly** (3)	**Minute Maid Park**	37,776	74–62

September: 14–11 (Home: 8–6; Away: 6–5)

#	Date	Opponent	Score	Win	Loss	Save	Location	Attendance	Record
137	September 1	Royals	**W** 7–2	**Blanco** (10–6)	Marsh (7–8)	—	**Minute Maid Park**	40,229	75–62
138	September 2	@ Reds	L 3–5	Spiers (5–5)	**Verlander** (3–5)	Wilson (2)	Great American Ball Park	24,606	75–63
139	September 4	@ Reds	L 5–12	Martinez (7–6)	**Arrighetti** (7–12)	Suter (1)	Great American Ball Park	17,865	75–64
140	September 5	@ Reds	L 0–1	Santillan (2–2)	**Abreu** (2–3)	Díaz (25)	Great American Ball Park	16,126	75–65
141	September 6	Diamondbacks	**W** 8–0	**Valdez** (14–6)	Pfaadt (9–8)	—	**Minute Maid Park**	34,218	76–65
142	September 7	Diamondbacks	**W** 11–5	**Kikuchi** (8–9)	Rodríguez (2–2)	—	**Minute Maid Park**	35,739	77–65
143	September 8	Diamondbacks	L 6–12	Ginkel (8–3)	**Verlander** (3–6)	—	**Minute Maid Park**	34,154	77–66
144	September 10	Athletics	L 3–4 (12)	Harris (4–3)	**Neris** (9–5)	—	**Minute Maid Park**	36,234	77–67
145	September 11	Athletics	L 4–5	Estes (7–7)	**Brown** (11–8)	Miller (24)	**Minute Maid Park**	32,327	77–68
146	September 12	Athletics	**W** 6–3	**Pressly** (2–3)	McFarland (2–3)	—	**Minute Maid Park**	30,720	78–68
147	September 13	@ Angels	**W** 5–3	**Kikuchi** (9–9)	Aldegheri (1–2)	**Hader** (30)	Angel Stadium	36,226	79–68
148	September 14	@ Angels	**W** 5–3	**Verlander** (4–6)	Anderson (10–13)	**Pressly** (4)	Angel Stadium	39,880	80–68
149	September 15	@ Angels	**W** 6–4	**Blanco** (11–6)	Dana (1–2)	**Hader** (31)	Angel Stadium	41,005	81–68
150	September 16	@ Padres	L 1–3	Darvish (6–3)	**Arrighetti** (7–13)	Suárez (33)	Petco Park	44,443	81–69
151	September 17	@ Padres	**W** 4–3 (10)	**Hader** (8–7)	Morejón (2–2)	**Neris** (18)	Petco Park	44,553	82–69
152	September 18	@ Padres	L 0–4	Cease (14–11)	**Valdez** (14–7)	Scott (21)	Petco Park	42,883	82–70
153	September 19	Angels	**W** 3–1	**Abreu** (3–3)	Miller (0–1)	**Hader** (32)	**Minute Maid Park**	33,107	83–70
154	September 20	Angels	**W** 9–7	**Neris** (10–5)	Anderson (10–14)	**Hader** (33)	**Minute Maid Park**	39,666	84–70
155	September 21	Angels	**W** 10–4	**Blanco** (12–6)	Detmers (4–8)	—	**Minute Maid Park**	40,502	85–70
156	September 22	Angels	L 8–9	Burke (1–0)	**Hader** (8–8)	Zuñiga (2)	**Minute Maid Park**	39,631	85–71
157	September 23	Mariners	L 1–6	Miller (12–8)	**Brown** (11–9)	—	**Minute Maid Park**	34,554	85–72
158	September 24	Mariners	**W** 4–3	**Valdez** (15–7)	Gilbert (8–12)	**Hader** (34)	**Minute Maid Park**	38,195	86–72
159	September 25	Mariners	L 1–8	Kirby (14–11)	**Kikuchi** (9–10)	—	**Minute Maid Park**	32,219	86–73
160	September 27	@ Guardians	**W** 5–2	**Blanco** (13–6)	Cantillo (2–4)	—	Progressive Field	34,149	87–73
161	September 28	@ Guardians	**W** 4–3	**Verlander** (5–6)	Lively (13–10)	**Dubin** (2)	Progressive Field	33,609	88–73
–	September 29	@ Guardians	Canceled (rain); Will not be made up						

== Postseason ==
=== Game log ===
2024 Postseason Game Log
Total: 0–2 (Home: 0–2; Away: 0–0)
AL Wild Card Series vs Tigers: 0–2 (Home: 0–2; Away: 0–0)

#	Date	Opponent	Score	Win	Loss	Save	Attendance	Record
1	October 1	Tigers	L 1–3	Skubal (1–0)	Valdez (0–1)	Brieske (1)	40,617	0–1
2	October 2	Tigers	L 2–5	Guenther (1–0)	Pressly (0–1)	Vest (1)	40,824	0–2

=== Postseason rosters ===
Playoff rosters
American League Wild Card Series

- Pitchers: 16 Yusei Kikuchi 41 Spencer Arrighetti 50 Héctor Neris 52 Bryan Abreu 55 Ryan Pressly 56 Ronel Blanco 58 Hunter Brown 59 Framber Valdez 64 Caleb Ferguson 71 Josh Hader 74 Bryan King
- Catchers: 17 Víctor Caratini 18 César Salazar 21 Yainer Díaz
- Infielders: 2 Alex Bregman 3 Jeremy Peña 9 Zach Dezenzo 11 Grae Kessinger 27 Jose Altuve 28 Jon Singleton
- Outfielders: 6 Jake Meyers 14 Mauricio Dubón 20 Chas McCormick 22 Jason Heyward 30 Kyle Tucker 44 Yordan Alvarez

=== American League Wild Card Series ===
The Astros, seeded third in the American League (AL) playoff rankings, faced the Detroit Tigers, seeded sixth, in the AL Wild Card Series held at Minute Maid Park. Managing for the Tigers was A. J. Hinch, who had led the Astros to their first World Series title in 2017, now facing his former team in a postseason tournament. As such, Hinch became the third manager in MLB history to accomplish this feat. (Note: Hinch joined Terry Francona, managing the Cleveland Indians versus the Boston Red Sox in the 2016 American League Division Series, and Billy Martin, with the Oakland Athletics versus the New York Yankees in the 1981 American League Championship Series.) Hinch was terminated by the Astros in the aftermath of the 2020 sign-stealing scandal

Game 1

Framber Valdez (0–1) started Game 1 for the Astros, lasted 4 1/3 innings, and surrendered three runs on seven hits. The Tigers struck in the second inning, when Wenceel Pérez singled with one out and Spencer Torkelson drew a walk. Parker Meadows grounded into a fielder's choice, resulting in runners on the corners. Jake Rogers, Trey Sweeney and Matt Vierling followed with consecutive RBI singles for a 3–0 lead. Tigers starter and AL Triple crown-winner Tarik Skubal (1–0) tossed six shutout innings in his playoff debut as the Tigers prevailed, 3–1. Ronel Blanco made his major league postseason debut, Tossing two scoreless innings in relief. Blanco maintained the Astros' deficit at 3–1 as he surrendered one hit, three walks, and struck out four.

Game 2

Hunter Brown started Game 2 for the Astros, for his first career postseason start, and eighth career appearance overall. He struck out nine in 5 1/3 innings. Setup man Ryan Pressly took the loss in Game 2 with 3 earned runs surrendered in 2/3 inningas as the Tigers swept the Astros were swept. A wild pitch in the top of the 8th inning allowed Kerry Carpenter to score and tie the contest 2–2, accounting for Pressly's first career blown save in the postseason after having converted each of his first 14 opportunities. Hader surrendered three hits and two bases on balls in 1/3 innings. The Astros lost their seventh consecutive postseason contest at home, and their run of qualifying for seven consecutive League Championship Series was stopped.

== Roster ==
2024 Houston Astros
Roster
Pitchers: 52 Bryan Abreu; 41 Spencer Arrighetti; 64 Brandon Bielak; 56 Ronel Blanco; 39 Jake Bloss; 58 Hunter Brown; 54 Dylan Coleman; 73 Luis Contreras; 39 Miguel Díaz; 66 Shawn Dubin; 64 Caleb Ferguson; 68 J. P. France; 71 Josh Hader; 70 Blair Henley; 72 Nick Hernandez; 53 Cristian Javier; 16 Yusei Kikuchi; 74 Bryan King; 72 Joel Kuhnel; 61 Seth Martinez; 47 Rafael Montero; 67 Parker Mushinski; 50 Héctor Neris; 63 Kaleb Ort; 55 Ryan Pressly; 50,54 Tayler Scott; 64 Alex Speas; 48 Wander Suero; 59 Framber Valdez; 35 Justin Verlander; 60 Forrest Whitley	Catchers: 17 Víctor Caratini; 21 Yainer Díaz; 18 César Salazar; Infielders: 79 José Abreu; 27 Jose Altuve; 15 Jacob Amaya; 2 Alex Bregman; 9 Zach Dezenzo; 12 Aledmys Díaz; 11,16 Grae Kessinger; 3 Jeremy Peña; 28 Jon Singleton; 10 Shay Whitcomb	Outfielders: 44 Yordan Alvarez; 38 Trey Cabbage; 14 Mauricio Dubón; 12 Ben Gamel; 22 Jason Heyward; 13 Cooper Hummel; 4 Pedro León; 10 Joey Loperfido; 20 Chas McCormick; 6 Jake Meyers; 30 Kyle Tucker	Manager: 19 Joe Espada; Coaches: 97 Jason Bell (quality control); 85 Javier Bracamonte (bullpen catcher); 37 Alex Cintrón (hitting); 23 Dave Clark (first base); 29 Michael Collins (coach); 99 Tommy Kawamura (major league coach); 22 Omar López (bench); 36 Josh Miller (pitching); 95 Bill Murphy (bullpen); 8 Gary Pettis (third base); 46 Troy Snitker (hitting)

== Major League Baseball draft ==
With the 28th slot in the MLB draft order, the Astros selected catcher Walker Janek from Sam Houston State University for their first-round pick. In 2024, Janek was the Buster Posey Award winner. Over 58 games during his junior season, he batted .364 with 17 home runs and 58 RBI.

The Astros forfeited their second-round selection in this year's draft as a result of signing free agent Josh Hader during the prior offseason, who had declined a qualifying offer from the San Diego Padres.

2024 MLB draft

Houston Astros selections
Round	Pick	Player	Position	School	Origin	Date signed	Ref.
1	28	Walker Janek	C	Sam Houston State	(Texas)	July 26	
2	Forfeited after signing free agent who received qualifying offer						
3	101	Ryan Forcucci	RHP	UC San Diego	(California)	July 27	
4	131	Parker Smith	RHP	Rice	(Texas)	July 29	
5	163	Cole Herzler	RHP	Liberty	(Pennsylvania)	July 20	
6	193	Caden Powell	SS	Seminole State	(Kansas)	July 29	
7	223	Joseph Sullivan	OF	South Alabama	(Alabama)	July 24	
8	253	Dylan Howard	RHP	Radford	(Massachusetts)	July 20	
9	283	Ryan Smith	RHP	Illinois Chicago	(Illinois)	July 20	
10	313	Ramsey David	RHP	Southeastern	(Georgia (U.S. state))	July 20	
11	343	Jason Schiavone	C	James Madison	(Maryland)	July 24	
12	373	Ryan Verdugo	RHP	CSU Bakersfield	(California)	July 24	
13	403	Bryce Boettcher	OF	Oregon	(Oregon)	July 25	
14	433	Ryan Mathiesen	RHP	Master's	(California)	July 24	
15	463	Drew Vogel	SS	Murray State	(Tennessee)	July 20	
16	493	Bryce Mayer	RHP	Missouri	(Missouri)	August 1	
17	523	Ethan Wagner	OF	P27 Academy (SC)	(Tennessee)	July 20	
18	553	Grant Burleson	RHP	Western Kentucky	(Tennessee)	July 20	
19	583	Twine Palmer	RHP	Connors State College	(Oklahoma)	July 20	
20	613	Ky McGary	OF	Sandra Day O'Connor HS (AZ)	(Montana)	Unsigned	
–	–	Lucas Spence	OF	SIU Edwardsville	(Illinois)	July 20 (Note: Signed as an undrafted free agent.) (Note: MLB debut on July 17, 2026)	
Ref.:

== Regular season transactions ==
=== 2024 trades ===
Trades

April 6, 2024	To Houston Astros Jacob Amaya (2B)	To Miami Marlis Valente Bellozo (SP)
May 4, 2024	To Houston Astros Cash	To Toronto Blue Jays Joel Kuhnel (RP)
May 16, 2024	To Houston Astros Cash	To Oakland Athletics Brandon Bielak (P)
July 30, 2024	To Houston Astros Yusei Kikuchi (SP)	To Toronto Blue Jays Jake Bloss (SP) Joey Loperfido (OF) Will Wagner (IF)
July 30, 2024	To Houston Astros Caleb Ferguson (RP)	To New York Yankees Kelly Austin (P)

=== Free agents and waiver claims ===
Acquisitions during 2024 regular season

Acquisitions during 2024 regular season
Transaction date	Player	Pos.	Method	Prior organization	Ref.
June 26, 2024	Omar Narváez	C	Free agency	New York Mets
July 13, 2024	Aledmys Díaz	UT	Free agency	Oakland Athletics
August 14, 2024	Glenn Otto	RHP	Free agency	San Diego Padres
August 16, 2024	Brandon Walter	LHP	Free agency	Boston Red Sox
August 20, 2024	Ben Gamel	OF	Waiver claim	New York Mets
August 24, 2024	Héctor Neris	RHP	Free agency	Chicago Cubs
August 29, 2024	Jason Heyward	OF	Free agency	Los Angeles Dodgers

Released or designated for assignment

Released during 2024 regular season
Transaction date	Player	Pos.	Gaining organization	Ref.
April 8, 2024	Miguel Díaz	RHP	Houston Astros (Note: Designated for assignment on April 8, cleared waivers and rejected optional assignment to AAA Sugar Land on April 11, and resigned with Astros as free agent the next day.)	
June 14, 2024	José Abreu	1B	—	
June 21, 2024	Blair Henley	RHP	Houston Astros (Note: Waived, went unclaimed and outrighted to AAA Sugar Land.)	
July 22, 2024	David Hensley	UT	Miami Marlins	
August 3, 2024	Rafael Montero	RHP	Houston Astros (Note: Designated for assignment on July 31 and accepted optional assignment to AAA Sugar Land on August 3.)	
August 16, 2024	Aledmys Díaz	UT	—	
August 26, 2024	Jacob Amaya	UT	Chicago White Sox	
August 29, 2024	Janson Junk	RHP	Oakland Athletics	
September 6, 2024	Parker Mushinski	LHP	Houston Astros	

== Statistics ==
Table key
*	Left-handed batter or pitcher
#	Switch hitter
	Team statistical leader
	Leader in appearances at position

=== Batting ===
Legend
⌖	Position	R	Runs scored	HR	Home runs	K	Strikeouts	SLG	Slugging percentage	RC	Runs created
G	Games played	H	Hits	RBI	Runs batted in	TB	Total bases	OPS	On-base plus slugging percentage	WPA	Win probability added
PA	Plate appearances	2B	Doubles	SB	Stolen bases	AVG	Batting average	OPS+	Adjusted OPS
AB	At bats	3B	Triples	BB	Bases on balls	OBP	On-base percentage

2024 regular season batting statistics
⌖	Player	G	PA	AB	R	H	2	3	HR	RBI	SB	BB	K	TB	AV	OB	SG	OPS	OP+	RC	WP
C	Yainer Díaz	148	619	585	70	175	29	3	16	84	2	24	107	258	.299	.325	.441	.766	118	77.6	0.1
1B	Jon Singleton*	119	405	355	46	83	13	1	13	42	0	47	111	137	.234	.321	.386	.707	103	46.7	0.7
2B	Jose Altuve	153	682	628	94	185	31	0	20	65	22	47	119	276	.295	.350	.439	.790	126	94.9	1.9
SS	Jeremy Peña	157	650	602	94	160	28	2	15	70	20	25	111	237	.266	.308	.394	.701	100	72.0	−2.3
3B	Alex Bregman	145	634	581	79	151	30	2	26	75	3	44	86	263	.260	.315	.453	.768	118	81.6	−0.9
LF	Mauricio Dubón	137	428	402	45	108	25	0	4	47	3	16	55	145	.269	.296	.361	.657	88	42.4	−0.4
CF	Jake Meyers	148	513	461	52	101	20	3	13	61	11	35	117	166	.219	.286	.360	.646	85	45.1	−1.0
RF	Kyle Tucker*	78	339	277	56	80	13	0	23	49	11	56	54	162	.289	.408	.585	.993	181	67.3	2.3
DH	Yordan Alvarez*	147	635	552	88	170	34	2	35	86	6	69	95	313	.308	.392	.567	.959	172	118.4	3.9
C	Víctor Caratini^{#}	87	274	245	30	66	8	1	8	30	0	23	53	100	.269	.336	.408	.744	113	33.1	0.4
OF	Chas McCormick	94	267	242	32	51	6	1	5	27	8	17	72	74	.211	.271	.306	.576	65	20.5	−1.6
1B	José Abreu	35	120	113	10	14	2	0	2	7	0	4	28	22	.124	.167	.195	.361	3	−0.1	−1.8
OF	Joey Loperfido*	38	118	106	11	25	5	1	2	16	2	7	43	15	.236	.299	.358	.658	87	11.6	−0.6
RF	Trey Cabbage*	45	91	86	12	18	8	0	1	8	1	4	34	29	.209	.253	.337	.590	68	6.6	−0.5
OF	Ben Gamel*	20	69	58	13	15	3	0	1	4	0	11	17	21	.259	.377	.362	.739	114	9.0	−0.3
1B	Zach Dezenzo	19	65	62	5	15	2	0	2	8	0	3	22	23	.242	.277	.371	.648	84	5.3	−0.1
RF	Jason Heyward*	24	61	55	8	12	2	0	4	9	1	5	17	29	.218	.283	.473	.756	112	7.8	−0.2
IF	Shay Whitcomb	20	46	41	1	9	3	0	0	5	0	5	8	12	.220	.304	.293	.593	73	3.6	0.2
C	César Salazar*	10	30	23	5	7	2	0	0	8	0	2	5	9	.304	.379	.391	.771	122	4.2	0.2
RF	Pedro León	7	21	20	2	2	0	0	0	0	2	1	10	2	.100	.143	.100	.243	−29	−0.9	−0.4
IF	Grae Kessinger	15	15	15	1	0	0	0	0	0	0	0	5	0	.000	.000	.000	.000	−100	−1.9	−0.2
LF	Cooper Hummel^{#}	6	8	8	0	0	0	0	0	0	1	0	2	0	.000	.000	.000	.000	−100	−1.0	0.0
IF	Aledmys Díaz	2	4	4	0	0	0	0	0	0	0	0	2	0	.000	.000	.000	.000	−100	−0.4	−0.1
2B	Jacob Amaya	1	1	1	0	0	0	0	0	0	0	0	0	0	.000	.000	.000	.000	−100	−0.1	0.0
Batting totals		161	6107	5530	740	1448	264	16	190	701	93	448	1176	2314	.262	.322	.418	.741	111	770	−1.3
AL rank				3	5	1	4	10	5		10	13	2	4	1	2	4	4		4	6
Primary source: • RC — Astros players: MLB teams:

=== Pitching ===
Legend
⌖	Pitcher by role	GS	Games started	IP	Innings pitched	BF	Batters faced	SO/9	Strikeouts per 9 innings pitched
W	Wins	GF	Games finished	H	Hits allowed	WHIP	Walks plus hits per inning pitched	K/BB	Strikeout-to-walk ratio
L	Losses	CG	Complete games	BB	Bases on balls allowed	ERA+	Adjusted ERA+	WPA	Win probability added
ERA	Earned run average	ShO	Shutouts	HR	Home runs allowed	H/9	Hits per nine innings pitched	RC	Runs created
G	Games pitched	SV	Saves	SO	Strikeouts	BB/9	Bases on balls per 9 innings pitched

2024 regular season pitching statistics
⌖	Player	W	L	ERA	G	GS	GF	CG	ShO	Sv	IP	H	ER	HR	BB	SO	ERA+	WHIP	H/9	BB/9	K/9	K/BB	PR	WP
SP	Framber Valdez *	15	7	2.91	28	28	0	1	0	0	176.1	140	57	13	55	169	136	1.106	7.1	2.8	8.6	3.07	21.8	2.9
SP	Hunter Brown	11	9	3.49	31	30	0	0	0	0	170.0	156	66	18	60	179	113	1.271	8.3	3.2	9.5	2.98	9.3	1.9
SP	Ronel Blanco	13	6	2.80	30	29	1	1	1	0	167.1	114	52	22	68	166	141	1.088	6.1	3.7	8.9	2.44	22.2	1.9
SP	Spencer Arrighetti	7	13	4.53	29	28	0	0	0	0	145.0	139	73	21	65	171	87	1.407	8.6	4.0	10.6	2.63	−9.7	−0.2
SP	Justin Verlander	5	6	5.48	17	17	0	0	0	0	90.1	98	55	16	27	74	72	1.384	9.8	2.7	7.4	2.74	−13.6	−0.7
SP	Yusei Kikuchi *	5	1	2.70	10	10	0	0	0	0	60.0	42	22	8	14	76	147	0.933	6.3	2.1	11.4	5.43	7.5	1.1
CL	Josh Hader*	8	8	3.80	71	0	62	0	0	34	71.0	43	30	12	25	105	104	0.958	5.5	3.2	13.3	4.20	1.2	1.9
SU	Bryan Abreu	3	3	3.10	78	0	3	0	0	1	78.1	59	27	9	32	103	128	1.162	6.8	3.7	11.8	3.22	8.8	1.8
RP	Tayler Scott	7	3	2.23	62	1	11	0	0	0	68.2	45	17	7	35	71	178	1.165	5.9	4.6	9.4	2.03	12.3	−0.1
SU	Ryan Pressly	2	3	3.49	59	0	8	0	0	4	56.2	58	22	4	18	58	114	1.341	9.2	2.9	9.2	3.22	2.6	−0.2
LR	Seth Martinez	3	2	3.59	44	0	14	0	0	1	52.2	49	21	7	18	36	111	1.272	8.4	3.1	6.2	2.00	1.8	0.3
LR	Shawn Dubin	1	1	4.17	31	2	11	0	0	2	45.1	45	21	3	26	49	95	1.566	8.9	5.2	9.7	1.88	−1.9	0.3
RP	Rafael Montero	1	2	4.70	41	0	7	0	0	0	38.1	35	20	8	19	23	85	1.409	8.2	4.5	5.4	1.21	−2.7	−0.3
SP	Cristian Javier	3	1	3.89	7	7	0	0	0	0	34.2	30	15	4	19	27	102	1.413	7.8	4.9	7.0	1.42	0.5	0.2
RP	Bryan King*	1	0	2.39	28	0	7	0	0	0	26.1	20	7	1	10	32	167	1.139	6.8	3.4	10.9	3.20	5.1	0.1
SP	J. P. France	0	3	7.46	5	5	0	0	0	0	25.1	31	21	5	12	22	54	1.697	11.0	4.3	7.8	1.83	−9.0	–0.8
RP	Kaleb Ort	1	2	2.55	22	0	5	0	0	0	24.2	16	7	7	4	26	157	0.811	5.8	1.5	9.5	6.50	4.4	−0.1
RP	Caleb Ferguson *	0	1	3.86	20	0	7	0	0	0	21.0	22	9	1	9	26	104	1.476	9.4	3.9	11.1	2.89	0.3	−0.4
RP	Brandon Bielak	0	0	5.71	10	0	2	0	0	0	17.1	22	11	7	3	12	71	1.673	11.4	3.6	4.7	1.29	−2.8	0.0
RP	Héctor Neris	2	1	4.70	16	0	3	0	0	1	15.1	14	8	2	4	18	86	1.043	8.2	1.2	10.6	9.00	−2.2	0.4
SP	Jake Bloss	0	1	6.94	3	3	0	0	0	0	11.2	52	9	5	3	11	59	1.629	12.3	2.3	8.5	3.67	−3.4	–0.3
RP	Parker Mushinski*	0	0	6.55	10	0	2	0	0	0	11.0	11	8	5	1	3	62	1.455	9.0	4.1	2.5	0.60	−3.4	−0.1
RP	Nick Hernandez	0	0	7.88	5	0	2	0	0	0	8.0	10	7	1	4	10	52	1.375	11.3	4.5	11.3	10.00	−3.1	0.0
RP	Luis Contreras	0	0	9.00	5	0	3	0	0	0	6.0	7	6	2	0	6	47	1.500	10.5	3.0	9.0	3.00	−3.0	0.1
RP	Forrest Whitley	0	0	0.00	3	0	2	0	0	0	3.1	5	0	3	0	5		2.400	13.5	8.1	13.5	1.67	0.7	0.0
RP	Joel Kuhnel	0	0	18.00	1	0	0	0	0	0	2.0	4	4	0	0	1	26	2.000	18.0	0.0	4.5		−2.8	0.0
RP	Alex Speas	0	0	4.50	1	0	1	0	0	0	2.0	2	1	1	1	2	105	1.500	9.0	4.5	9.0	2.00	0.1	0.0
RP	Dylan Coleman	0	0	0.00	1	0	1	0	0	0	1.0	0	0	1	0	1		1.000	0.0	9.0	9.0	1.00	0.6	0.0
RP	Miguel Díaz	0	0	0.00	1	0	1	0	0	0	1.0	0	0	0	0	0		0.000	0.0	0.0	0.0		0.6	0.0
RP	Grae Kessinger	0	0	0.00	1	0	1	0	0	0	1.0	0	0	0	0	0		0.000	0.0	0.0	0.0		0.6	0.0
SP	Blair Henley	0	0	135.00	1	1	0	0	0	0	0.1	4	5	3	0	0	6	21.000	108.0	81.0	0.0	0.00	−4.6	–0.5
RP	Wander Suero	0	1		1	0	0	0	0	0	0.0	1	0	0	0	0							−0.3	–0.2
Pitching totals		88	73	3.74	161	161	159	2	1	43	1432.0	1238	595	183	544	1479	106	1.244	7.8	3.4	9.3	2.72	38.1	8.9
AL rank		4	12	4				2	8	6	9	3	4	7	13	2							4	4
Primary source: • Adjusted pitching runs & Win Probability Added:

== Awards and achievements ==
=== Offensive achievements ===
==== Hitting for the cycle ====
Date	Player	H / AB	R	1B	2B	3B	HR	BI	Other	Score	Opponent	Box
July 21	Yordan Alvarez	4-for-4	2	1	8	6	4	2		4–6	Seattle Mariners	
Alvarez: 2B (22) • 3B (2) • HR (20) • RBI (54)

=== Pitching achievements ===
==== No-hit game ====
Date	Pitcher	IP	BB	BR	K	Pit.	BF	Catcher	Final	Opponent	Venue	Plate umpire	Box
April 1, 2024	Ronel Blanco	9	2	2	7	105	29	Yainer Díaz	10–0	Toronto Blue Jays	Minute Maid Park	Charlie Ramos	
April 1, 2024	Blanco: Game score: 92 • Win (1–0)												

==== Other no-hit bids ====
Date	Starting pitcher (IP)	Relief pitcher(s) (IP)	No-hit IP	GS	Catcher	Batter	Final	Opponent	Box
June 16, 2024	Ronel Blanco (7)	Ryan Pressly (2/3)	7 2/3	82	Yainer Díaz	Wenceel Pérez	4–1	Detroit Tigers	
August 6, 2024	Framber Valdez (8 2/3)	—	8 2/3	76	Yainer Díaz	Corey Seager	4–2	Texas Rangers	
August 28, 2024	Spencer Arrighetti (7 2/3)	—	7 2/3	82	Víctor Caratini	Austin Hays	10–0	Philadelphia Phillies	
August 30, 2024	Framber Valdez (7)	Bryan Abreu (2/3)	7 2/3	81	Yainer Díaz	Kyle Isbel	3–2	Kansas City Royals	
Note: Includes those games started with 7 or more no-hit innings.

=== Career honors ===
Inductees into the Houston Astros Hall of Fame
Individual	Role	Uni.	Seasons	Games	Start	Finish	Bio.
Ken Caminiti	Third baseman	11	10	1085	1987	1994	Summary
Ken Caminiti	Third baseman	11	10	1085	1999	2000	Summary
René Cárdenas	Broadcaster	—	16	—	1962	1975	Summary
René Cárdenas	Broadcaster	—	16	—	2007	2008	Summary
See also: Complete list of inductees • Sources:

=== Annual awards ===
2024 Houston Astros award winners
Name of award			Recipient	Ref.
All-MLB Team	Second Team	Second baseman	Jose Altuve	
All-MLB Team	Second Team	Designated hitter	Yordan Alvarez	
All-MLB Team	Second Team	Starting pitcher	Framber Valdez	
American League (AL) Player of the Week		April 7	Ronel Blanco	
American League (AL) Player of the Week		August 12	Yordan Alvarez	
American League (AL) Player of the Week		August 12	Alex Bregman	
American League (AL) Reliever of the Month		August	Josh Hader	
American League (AL) Rookie of the Month		August	Spencer Arrighetti	
Darryl Kile Good Guy Award			Mauricio Dubón	
Fred Hartman Award for Long and Meritorious Service to Baseball			Javier Bracamonte	
Gold Glove Award		Third baseman	Alex Bregman	
Houston Astros		Most Valuable Player (MVP)	Yordan Alvarez	
Houston Astros		Pitcher of the Year	Ronel Blanco	
Houston Astros		Rookie of the Year	Spencer Arrighetti	
MLB All-Star Game		Starting second baseman (Note: Unavailable to participate; was replaced in the starting lineup by Marcus Semien of the Texas Rangers, and on the American League roster by Willi Castro of the Minnesota Twins.)	Jose Altuve	
MLB All-Star Game		Starting designated hitter	Yordan Alvarez	
MLB All-Star Game		Reserve outfielder (Note: Unavailable to participate due to injury; was replaced on the American League roster by Anthony Santander of the Baltimore Orioles.)	Kyle Tucker	
Silver Slugger Award		Second baseman	Jose Altuve	
The Sporting News AL All-Star		Second baseman	Jose Altuve	
The Sporting News AL All-Star		Designated hitter	Yordan Alvarez	

Other nominations and voting results
- ×4 All-MLB Team nominees: Ronel Blanco, Alex Bregman, Yainer Díaz, and Josh Hader
- ×2 Cy Young balloting: Framber Valdez (7th—3rd place×2, 4th×3, 5th×3), Yusei Kikuchi (9th, tied—5th place×1)
- ×2 Gold Glove nominees: Mauricio Dubón (UT) and Jake Meyers (CF)
- Hank Aaron nominee: Yordan Alvarez
- Heart & Hustle nominee: Jeremy Peña
- ×3 Most Valuable Player: Yordan Alvarez (9th), Jose Altuve (15th), Framber Valdez (15th)
- Roberto Clemente: Winner—Salvador Pérez (KC) • Nominee—Tucker (HOU)
- ×3 Silver Slugger nominees: Yainer Díaz (C), Alex Bregman (3B), Yordan Alvarez (DH)

=== League leaders ===
==== Batting ====
2024 AL batting leaders
Category	Player	Figure	Rank
Wins Above Replacement (WAR)—position players	Yordan Alvarez	5.3	10th
WAR—offense	Yordan Alvarez	5.9	4th
WAR—offense	Jose Altuve	4.8	10th
Batting average (AVG)	Yordan Alvarez	.308	4th
Batting average (AVG)	Yainer Díaz	.299	5th
Batting average (AVG)	Jose Altuve	.295	6th
On-base percentage (OBP)	Yordan Alvarez	.392	4th
Slugging percentage (SLG)	Yordan Alvarez	.567	4th
On-base plus slugging (OPS)	Yordan Alvarez	.959	4th
Plate appearances	Jose Altuve	682	10th
At bats	Jose Altuve	628	6th
At bats	Jeremy Peña	602	9th
Hits	Jose Altuve	185	4th
Hits	Yainer Díaz	175	7th
Hits	Yordan Alvarez	170	9th
Runs scored	Jose Altuve	94	9th
Total bases	Yordan Alvarez	313	8th
Doubles (2B)	Yordan Alvarez	34	7th
Home runs (HR)	Yordan Alvarez	35	7th
Extra-base hits	Yordan Alvarez	71	8th
Bases on balls	Yordan Alvarez	69	8th
Singles	Jose Altuve	134	1st
Singles	Yainer Díaz	127	2nd
Singles	Jeremy Peña	115	6th
Adjusted OPS+	Yordan Alvarez	172	3rd
Runs created (RC)	Yordan Alvarez	124	6th
Adjusted batting runs	Yordan Alvarez	54	5th
Adjusted batting runs	Kyle Tucker	32	9th
Adjusted batting wins	Yordan Alvarez	5.4	5th
Adjusted batting wins	Kyle Tucker	3.2	9th
Extra-base hits	Yordan Alvarez	71	8th
Times on base	Yordan Alvarez	249	7th
Times on base	Jose Altuve	239	8th
Offensive win percentage	Yordan Alvarez	.770	4th
Hits by pitch	Jeremy Peña	14	10th
Sacrifice hits	Mauricio Dubón	3	9th
Sacrifice hits	Jake Meyers	3	9th
Sacrifice hits	Jeremy Peña	3	9th
Sacrifice flies	Yainer Díaz	8	4th
Intentional bases on balls	Yordan Alvarez	16	2nd
Double plays grounded into	Yainer Díaz	22	1st
Double plays grounded into	Jake Meyers	17	3rd
Caught stealing	Jose Altuve	7	8th
Power–speed number	Jose Altuve	21.0	8th
At bats per strikeout	Alex Bregman	6.8	4th
At bats per home run	Yordan Alvarez	15.8	6th
Outs made	Jeremy Peña	472	5th
Outs made	Jose Altuve	465	8th
Base-out runs added (RE24)	Yordan Alvarez	45.44	6th
Win probability added (WPA)	Yordan Alvarez	3.9	5th
Sit. wins added (WPA/LI)	Yordan Alvarez	5.3	4th
Sit. wins added (WPA/LI)	Kyle Tucker	3.2	9th
Championship WPA (cWPA)	Yordan Alvarez	2.1	4th
Base-out wins added (REW)	Yordan Alvarez	4.6	6th
Ref:

==== Pitching ====
2024 AL pitching leaders
Category	Player	Figure	Rank
Wins Above Replacement (WAR)—pitchers	Framber Valdez	4.5	5th
Wins Above Replacement (WAR)—pitchers	Ronel Blanco	4.5	6th
Earned run average (ERA)	Ronel Blanco	2.80	2nd
Earned run average (ERA)	Framber Valdez	2.91	3rd
Wins	Framber Valdez	15	5th
Win–loss percentage	Ronel Blanco	.684	3rd
Win–loss percentage	Framber Valdez	.682	4th
WHIP	Ronel Blanco	1.088	6th
WHIP	Framber Valdez	1.106	9th
Hits per nine innings (H/9)	Ronel Blanco	6.131	1st
Hits per nine innings (H/9)	Framber Valdez	7.146	7th
K/9	Yusei Kikuchi (Note: Includes 22 games with Toronto Blue Jays and 10 with Houston Astros.)	10.554	2nd
K/9	Hunter Brown	9.476	8th
Games played	Bryan Abreu	78	2nd
Games played	Josh Hader	71	9th
Games started	Yusei Kikuchi	32	4th
Games finished	Josh Hader	62	2nd
Complete games	Ronel Blanco	1	2nd
Complete games	Framber Valdez	1	2nd
Shutouts	Ronel Blanco	1	1st
Quality starts	Hunter Brown	19	8th
Saves	Josh Hader	34	2nd
Holds	Bryan Abreu	38	1st
Holds	Ryan Pressly	25	6th
Strikeouts (SO)	Yusei Kikuchi	206	5th
Hits allowed (H)	Yusei Kikuchi	167	10th
Bases on balls (BB)	Ronel Blanco	68	4th
Bases on balls (BB)	Spencer Arrighetti	65	7th
Bases on balls (BB)	Hunter Brown	60	10th
Home runs allowed (HR)	Yusei Kikuchi	25	10th
Strikeout-to-walk ratio (K/BB)	Yusei Kikuchi	4.682	6th
Home runs per nine innings (HR/9)	Framber Valdez	0.664	2nd
Home runs per nine innings (HR/9)	Hunter Brown	0.953	8th
Losses	Spencer Arrighetti	13	6th
Earned runs allowed (ER)	Yusei Kikuchi	79	7th
Wild pitches	Framber Valdez	8	4th
Wild pitches	Ryan Pressly	7	7th
Adjusted ERA+	Ronel Blanco	141	2nd
Adjusted ERA+	Framber Valdez	136	5th
Fielding Independent Pitching (FIP)	Framber Valdez	3.25	3rd
Fielding Independent Pitching (FIP)	Yusei Kikuchi	3.46	6th
Adjusted pitching runs	Ronel Blanco	22	4th
Adjusted pitching runs	Framber Valdez	22	5th
Adjusted pitching wins	Ronel Blanco	2.4	4th
Adjusted pitching wins	Framber Valdez	2.3	5th
Base out runs saved (RE24)	Ronel Blanco	27.55	5th
Base out runs saved (RE24)	Framber Valdez	26.34	7th
Situational wins saved (WPA/LI)	Framber Valdez	2.9	6th
Championship Win Probability Added (cWPA)	Framber Valdez	1.9	6th
Base-out wins saved (REW)	Ronel Blanco	3.0	4th
Base-out wins saved (REW)	Framber Valdez	2.9	7th
Primary source: • QS & Hld (AL leaders):

=== Milestones ===
==== Major League debuts ====
Player—Appeared at position

- Blair Henley, starting pitcher
- Spencer Arrighetti, starting pitcher
- Forrest Whitley, relief pitcher
- Joey Loperfido, right fielder
- Jake Bloss, starting pitcher
- Bryan King, relief pitcher
- Luis Contreras, relief pitcher
- Pedro León, right fielder
- Zach Dezenzo, designated hitter
- Shay Whitcomb, third baseman
Date and opponent

- April 8 at Texas
- April 10 at Kansas City
- April 16 vs Atlanta
- April 30 vs Cleveland
- June 21 vs Baltimore
- June 23 vs Baltimore
- June 23 vs Baltimore
- August 3 vs Tampa Bay
- August 6 at Texas
- August 17 vs Chicago (AL)
Ref.

Also:

==== Career achievements ====
Date	Individual	Role	Quantity	Statistic	Notes	Ref.
April 1, 2024	Ronel Blanco	Starting pitcher	1st	complete game	Part of 17th no-hitter in club history	
April 1, 2024	Ronel Blanco	Starting pitcher	1st	shutout	Part of 17th no-hitter in club history	
April 1, 2024	Joe Espada	Manager	1st	managerial win	Part of 17th no-hitter in club history	
April 25, 2024	Alex Bregman	Third baseman	1,000th	hit	14th in Astros history to reach milestone	
April 30, 2024	Joey Loperfido	Right fielder	1st	hit		
May 2, 2024	Tayler Scott	Relief pitcher	1st	win		
May 3, 2024	Jose Altuve	Second baseman	300th	stolen base	3rd in Astros history to reach milestone	
May 13, 2024	Spencer Arrighetti	Starting pitcher	1st	win		
May 24, 2024	Justin Verlander	Starting pitcher	3,372nd	strikeout	Moved into 10th place in MLB history	
May 24, 2024	Justin Verlander	Starting pitcher	260th	win	41st all-time (Note: Tied with Hall of Famer Ted Lyons.)	
June 15, 2024	Víctor Caratini	Catcher	1st	triple		
August 3, 2024	Pedro León	Right fielder	1st	hit		
August 7, 2024	Yordan Alvarez	Left fielder	150th	home run	Fewest games in Astros history (590)	
August 9, 2024	Jose Altuve	Second baseman	224th	home run	3rd place in Astros history	
August 10, 2024	Zach Dezenzo	First baseman	1st	home run		
August 17, 2024	Shay Whitcomb	Third baseman	1st	hit		
September 10, 2024	Jon Singleton	Pinch hitter	1st	triple		
September 13, 2024	Houston Colt .45s/Astros	Franchise	5,000th	win	All-time	
September 13, 2024	Josh Hader	Closer	30th	save	4th consecutive season	

=== Ejections ===
No.	Date	Astros personnel	H/A	Opposing team	Ref.
1	May 14	Ronel Blanco	H	Oakland Athletics	
2	June 30	Jose Altuve	A	New York Mets	
3	July 13	Mauricio Dubón	H	Texas Rangers	
4	August 29	Alex Bregman	H	Kansas City Royals	
5	September 5	Joe Espada	A	Cincinnati Reds	

=== Other ===
2024 grand slams
No.	Date	Astros batter	Venue	Opponent	Pitcher	Inning	Ref.
None (Note: The Astros' first non-shortened season without a grand slam since 1993, and first of any season since 2020.)

== Minor league system ==
=== Teams ===
Level	Team	League	Manager
AAA	Sugar Land Space Cowboys	Pacific Coast League	Mickey Storey
AA	Corpus Christi Hooks	Texas League	Dickie Joe Thon
High-A	Asheville Tourists	South Atlantic League	Nate Shaver
Low-A	Fayetteville Woodpeckers	Carolina League	Ricky Rivera
Rookie	FCL Astros	Florida Complex League	
Rookie	DSL Astros	Dominican Summer League	

=== Summary ===
On September 26, Sugar Land swept the Reno Aces for the franchise's first-ever PCL championship, 5–2. Pedro León and Trey Cabbage hit back-to-back home runs in the first inning for Sugar Land, and Cooper Hummel added a run-scoring double. Miguel Ullola shut out Reno over four innings, and Logan VanWey, Forrest Whitley, Luis Contreras and Wander Suero (save credited) tossed a combined 3 2/3 scoreless frames. Suero had also established the franchise's record for saves at 37. The Space Cowboys posted a minor-league best 93–56 record. It was the first PCL title for an Astros affiliate since the Fresno Grizzlies won in 2015.

The Space Cowboys next won the Triple-A National Championship Game, 13–6, over the Omaha Storm Chasers, marking the final game of the season in all minor league baseball and Sugar Land's first-ever such championship. Shay Whitcomb was 3-for-5 while stroking a three-run double as he was named Most Valuable Player (MVP).

=== Championships ===
- Pacific Coast League champions: Sugar Land
- Triple-A National Champions: Sugar Land

=== Awards ===
- Arizona Fall League Pitcher of the Week — Week 2: Alex Reyes II
- Astros Minor League Hitter of the Year: Shay Whitcomb
- Astros Minor League Pitcher of the Year: Miguel Ullola
- Pacific Coast League Manager of the Year: Mickey Storey
- Pacific Coast League Pitcher of the Month – July: Ryan Gusto
- Triple-A All-Stars
  - Pedro León (OF)
  - Shay Whitcomb (DH)
  - A. J. Blubaugh (SP)
  - Colton Gordon (SP)
  - Ryan Gusto (SP)
  - Wander Suero (RP)
  - Mickey Storey (manager)
- Triple-A National Championship Most Valuable Player (MVP): Shay Whitcomb

== See also ==
- List of Major League Baseball franchise postseason streaks
- List of Major League Baseball no-hitters
- List of Major League Baseball players to hit for the cycle
- List of Major League Baseball postseason sweeps
