= Pedro León (baseball) =

Cuban baseball player (born 1998)

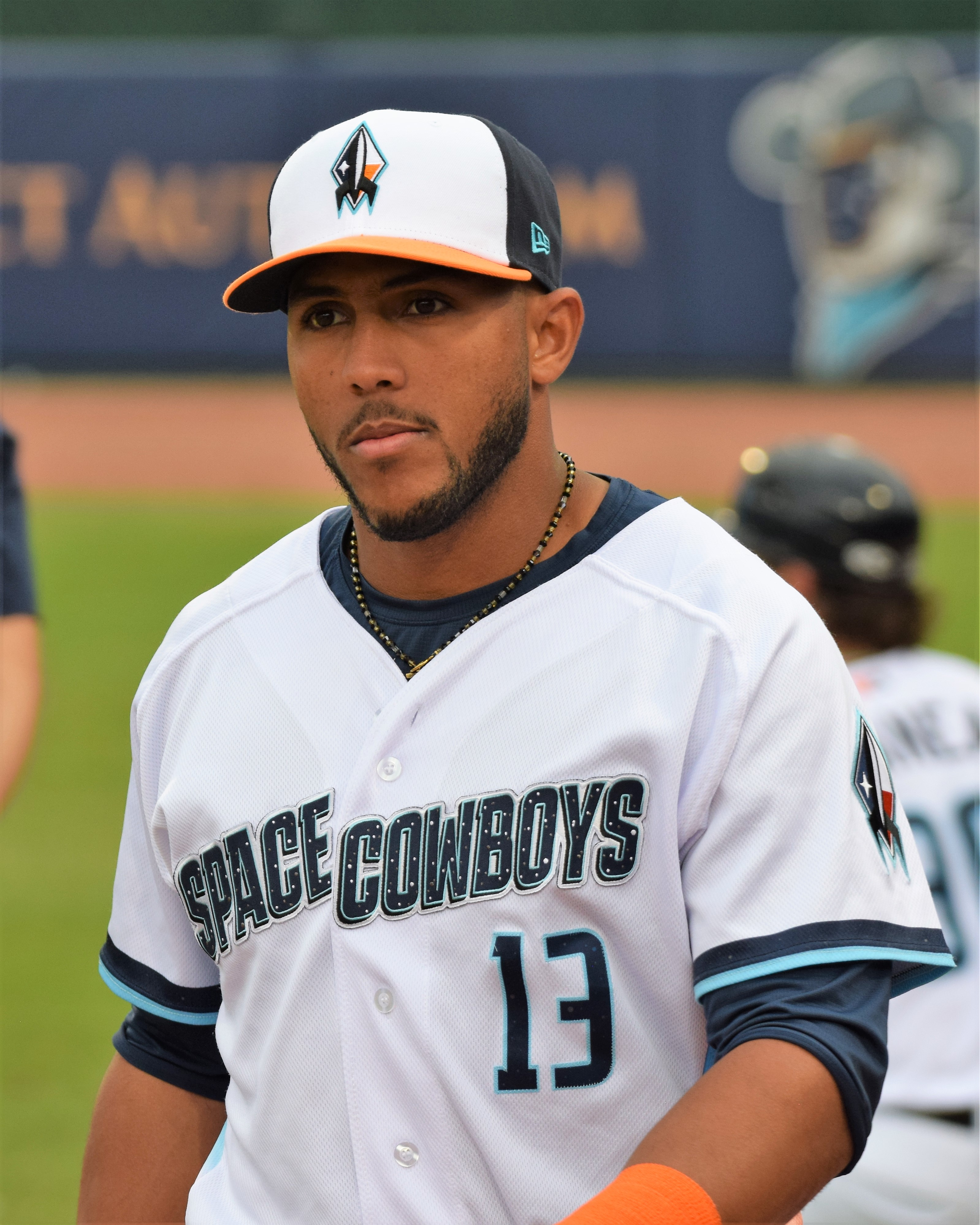
- León in 2022 with the Sugar Land Space Cowboys

Free agent
- Outfielder
- Born: May 28, 1998 (age 28); La Habana, Cuba
- Bats: Right Throws: Right

MLB debut
- August 3, 2024, for the Houston Astros

MLB statistics (through 2024 season)
- Batting average: .100
- Home runs: 0
- Runs batted in: 0
- Stats at Baseball Reference

Teams
- Houston Astros (2024)

Pedro Manuel León (born May 28, 1998) is a Cuban professional baseball outfielder who is a free agent. He has previously played in Major League Baseball (MLB) for the Houston Astros. He played for Huracanes de Mayabeque of the Cuban National Series before he defected from Cuba. He made his MLB debut in 2024.

== Career ==
León began his professional baseball career playing for the Huracanes de Mayabeque of the Cuban National Series. In the 2017–18 season, he batted .325 with four home runs, 14 runs batted in (RBI), and 15 runs in 22 games. The following season, León hit .371 with 15 home runs, a 1.220 OPS and seven stolen bases in 33 games and played in the 2018 National Series All-Star Game. Considered a top international prospect for the Major Leagues, León defected from Cuba to the Dominican Republic in 2019.

=== Houston Astros ===
León agreed to sign with the Houston Astros in February 2020, and signed for a $4 million bonus on January 15, 2021. León was a non-roster invitee to the Astros spring training in 2021. León was reassigned to minor league camp after going 0–12 in six spring training games. He was assigned to the Double-A Corpus Christi Hooks prior to the start of the 2021 season and moved to the shortstop position. In June 2021, León was selected to play in the All-Star Futures Game. He was promoted to the Triple-A Sugar Land Skeeters on July 19, 2021, after batting .249 with nine home runs and 33 RBI with Corpus Christi.

León was named to the Astros' 2022 spring training roster as a non-roster invitee. He was assigned to the Triple-A Sugar Land Space Cowboys, where he spent the entire season. In 115 games with the team, León slashed .228/.365/.431 with 17 home runs, 63 RBI, and 38 stolen bases.

On January 20, 2023, it was announced that León had undergone sports hernia surgery. The recovery timetable was 6–8 weeks, causing León to miss major league Spring Training. In a June 24 game against the Salt Lake Bees, León hit for the cycle. The feat became the first cycle in Space Cowboys history, as the team won the game 21–6. In 128 games for Sugar Land in 2023, León slashed .244/.343/.435 with 21 home runs, 72 RBI, and 21 stolen bases.

León began the 2024 campaign back with Sugar Land, playing in 93 games and batting .297/.377/.519 with 19 home runs, 74 RBI, and 23 stolen bases. On July 30, 2024, he was selected to the 40-man roster and promoted to the major leagues for the first time. He appeared in a total of seven games for the Astros in 2024, going 2-for-20, scored 2 runs, stole 2 bases, drew 1 walk and 10 strikeouts.

León's 2024 regular season batting at Sugar Land culminated with .299/.372/.514/.886, 25 doubles, 24 home runs, 90 RBI, 29 stolen bases, 43 bases on balls, and 144 strikeouts over 118 games. Named to the PCL Triple-A All-Star team, he was also a member of Sugar Land's first-ever Triple-A championship team, defeating the Omaha Storm Chasers, 13–6.

León began the 2025 season on the injured list after suffering a strained MCL in his left knee during spring training. He was transferred to the 60-day injured list on June 24.

=== Philadelphia Phillies ===
On November 6, 2025, León was claimed off waivers by the Baltimore Orioles. He was designated for assignment after Baltimore added Cameron Foster and Reed Trimble to their roster on November 18. On November 21, León was claimed off waivers by the Philadelphia Phillies.

León was optioned to the Triple-A Lehigh Valley IronPigs to begin the 2026 season. In 12 games for Lehigh Valley, he slashed.283/.358/.326 with no home runs and four RBI. León was released by Philadelphia on April 18. On April 20, León signed a minor league contract to return to the Phillies organization. He elected free agency on November 2.
