= Trey Cabbage =

American baseball player (born 1997)

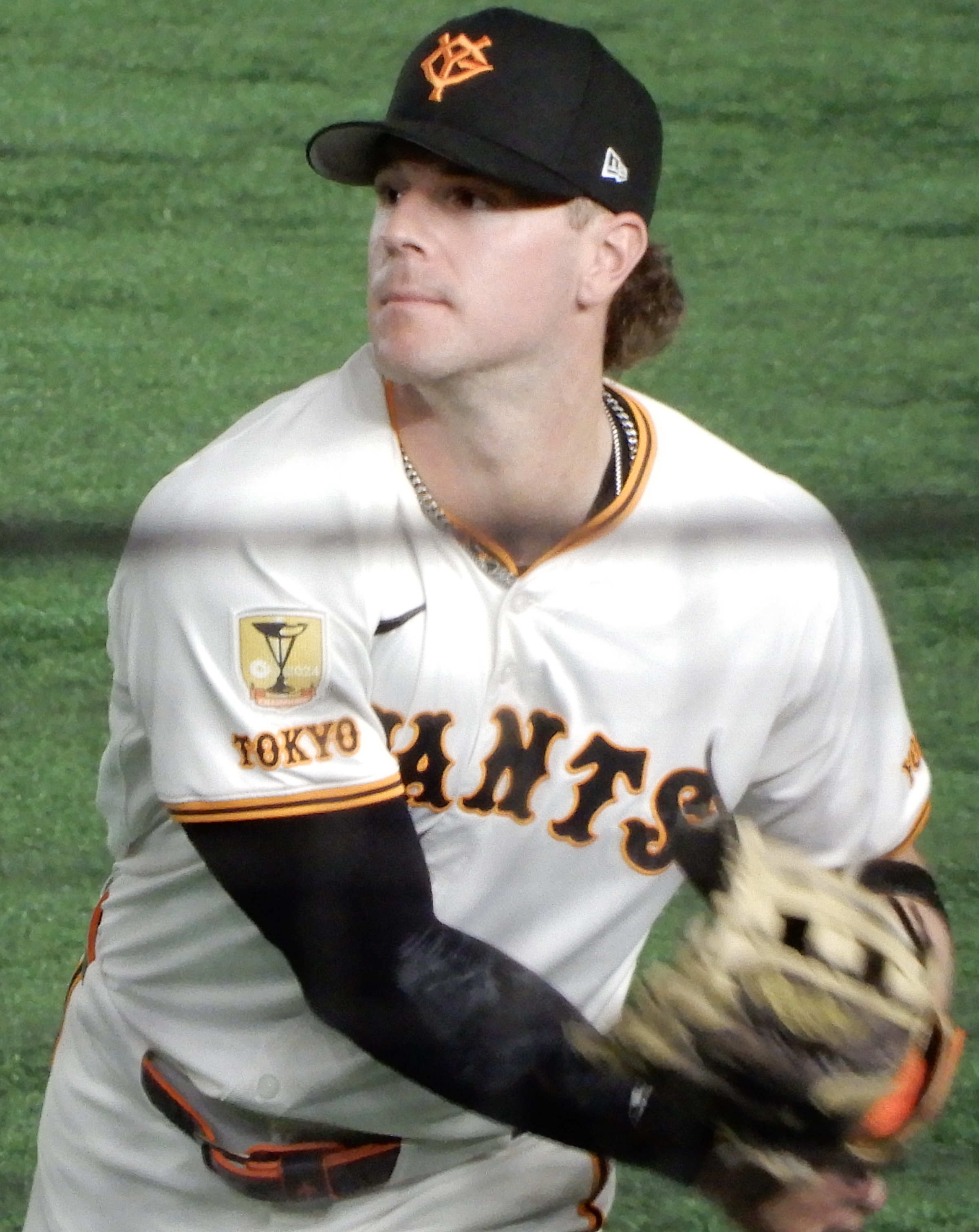
- Cabbage with the Yomiuri Giants in 2025

Yomiuri Giants – No. 13
- Outfielder / First baseman
- Born: May 3, 1997 (age 29); Rutledge, Tennessee, U.S.
- Bats: Left Throws: Right

Professional debut
- MLB: July 14, 2023, for the Los Angeles Angels
- NPB: March 28, 2025, for the Yomiuri Giants

MLB statistics (through 2024 season)
- Batting average: .209
- Home runs: 2
- Runs batted in: 15

NPB statistics (through August 18, 2026)
- Batting average: .253
- Home runs: 30
- Runs batted in: 80
- Stats at Baseball Reference

Teams
- Los Angeles Angels (2023); Houston Astros (2024); Yomiuri Giants (2025–present)

Trey Aaron Cabbage (born May 3, 1997) is an American professional baseball outfielder and first baseman for the Yomiuri Giants of Nippon Professional Baseball (NPB). He has previously played in Major League Baseball (MLB) for the Los Angeles Angels and Houston Astros.

== Career ==
=== Amateur career ===
Cabbage grew up in Blaine, Tennessee. He attended Rutledge High School in Rutledge, Tennessee, where he played for the school's baseball and basketball teams. He committed to attend the University of Tennessee to play college baseball for the Volunteers. Cabbage was named a third team All-American in his senior year of high school.

=== Minnesota Twins ===
The Minnesota Twins selected Cabbage in the fourth round, with the 110th overall selection, of the 2015 MLB draft. He signed with the Twins, receiving a $760,000 signing bonus, which was $242,100 more than the recommended value for the 110th slot. Cabbage made his professional debut with the rookie-level Gulf Coast Twins, hitting .252 with 13 runs batted in (RBIs) in 33 games.

Cabbage played for the rookie-level Elizabethton Twins in 2016, hitting .204/.297/.337 with two home runs and eight RBIs in 31 games. He returned to the team in 2017, and hit .240 in 13 games before he was promoted to the Single-A Cedar Rapids Kernels. In 2018, he spent the entire year with Cedar Rapids, playing in 99 games and hitting .244/.307/.403 with eight home runs and 45 RBIs. Cabbage split the 2019 season between Cedar Rapids and the High-A Fort Myers Miracle, playing in 99 games and hitting .239/.306/.447 with 15 home runs and 53 RBIs.

Cabbage did not play in a game in 2020 due to the cancellation of the minor league season because of the COVID-19 pandemic. He started the 2021 season with Cedar Rapids and was promoted to the Double-A Wichita Wind Surge in July. In 108 games, Cabbage batted a cumulative .264/.346/.535 with 27 home runs and 82 RBIs. He elected free agency following the season on November 7, 2021.

=== Los Angeles Angels ===
On November 28, 2021, Cabbage signed a minor league contract with the Los Angeles Angels organization. In 2022, he played in 30 games for the Rocket City Trash Pandas, hitting .327/.434/.664 with 10 home runs, 32 RBIs, and a career-high 10 stolen bases. He was named the Southern League's player of the month for April. On May 25, 2022, it was announced that Cabbage would miss 3-to-4 months after being diagnosed with a fractured left forearm. The injury ended up being season-ending, as Cabbage did not play in another game in 2022.

Cabbage was assigned to the Triple-A Salt Lake Bees to begin the 2023 season, marking his first stint at the Triple-A level. On April 19, 2023, Cabbage hit a 487-foot (148 m) home run off Tommy Henry of the Reno Aces. In 81 games for Salt Lake, he hit .287/.358/.576 with 23 home runs, 64 RBIs, and 24 stolen bases. On July 14, Cabbage was selected to the 40-man roster and promoted to the major leagues for the first time. In 22 games for the Angels, he hit .208/.232/.321 with one home run and seven RBIs. On January 27, 2024, Cabbage was designated for assignment by the Angels.

=== Houston Astros ===
On January 31, 2024, the Angels traded Cabbage to the Houston Astros in exchange for Carlos Espinosa. Cabbage was optioned to the Triple-A Sugar Land Space Cowboys to begin the 2024 season. In 45 games with the major league club, Cabbage hit .209/.253/.337, including 8 doubles, 1 home run, 1 stolen base, 12 runs scored, and 8 RBI.

On November 4, 2024, Cabbage was claimed off waivers by the Pittsburgh Pirates. However, he was released by the Pirates on December 16.

=== Yomiuri Giants ===
On December 17, 2024, Cabbage signed with the Yomiuri Giants of Nippon Professional Baseball. On May 28, 2025, Cabbage hit the 11,000th home run in NPB history.
