= Blair Henley =

American baseball player (born 1997)

Free agent
- Pitcher
- Born: May 14, 1997 (age 29); Fort Worth, Texas, U.S.
- Bats: Right Throws: Right

MLB debut
- April 8, 2024, for the Houston Astros

MLB statistics (through 2024 season)
- Win–loss record: 0–0
- Earned run average: 135.00
- Strikeouts: 0
- Stats at Baseball Reference

Teams
- Houston Astros (2024)

Michael Blair Henley (born May 14, 1997) is an American professional baseball pitcher who is currently a free agent. He has previously played in Major League Baseball (MLB) for the Houston Astros.

== Amateur career ==
Henley attended Arlington Heights High School in Fort Worth, Texas, and the University of Texas at Austin, where he played college baseball for the Texas Longhorns. In 2018, he played collegiate summer baseball with the Yarmouth–Dennis Red Sox of the Cape Cod Baseball League. The Houston Astros of Major League Baseball (MLB) drafted him in the seventh round, with the 226th overall selection, of the 2019 Major League Baseball draft.

== Professional career ==
=== Houston Astros ===
Henley made his professional debut with the rookie–level Gulf Coast League Astros, and spent the remainder of the year with the Low–A Tri-City ValleyCats. In 11 games, he logged a 1.60 ERA with 46 strikeouts across 33 2/3 innings pitched. Henley did not play in a game in 2020 due to the cancellation of the minor league season because of the COVID-19 pandemic.

Henley returned to action in 2021 with the High–A Asheville Tourists. However, after only five appearances he underwent Tommy John surgery, which caused him to miss the remainder of the year as well as the entirety of the 2022 season. In 2023, Henley made 25 appearances (17 starts) for the Double–A Corpus Christi Hooks, registering a 3–6 record and 5.06 ERA with 106 strikeouts across 106 2/3 innings.

The Astros promoted Henley to the major leagues on April 8, 2024, to make his major league debut in place of Framber Valdez. He allowed five earned runs while recording one out and was optioned back to the Triple-A Sugar Land Space Cowboys after the game. Henley was designated for assignment following the promotion of Jake Bloss on June 21. He cleared waivers and was sent outright to Sugar Land on June 28. Henley was released by the Astros organization on March 12, 2025.

=== Cleburne Railroaders ===
On April 26, 2025, Henley signed with the Cleburne Railroaders of the American Association of Professional Baseball. In 19 games (18 starts) he threw 103 innings going 2-10 with a 6.99 ERA and 117 strikeouts. He became a free agent following the 2025 season.
