= Jacob Amaya =

American baseball player (born 1998)

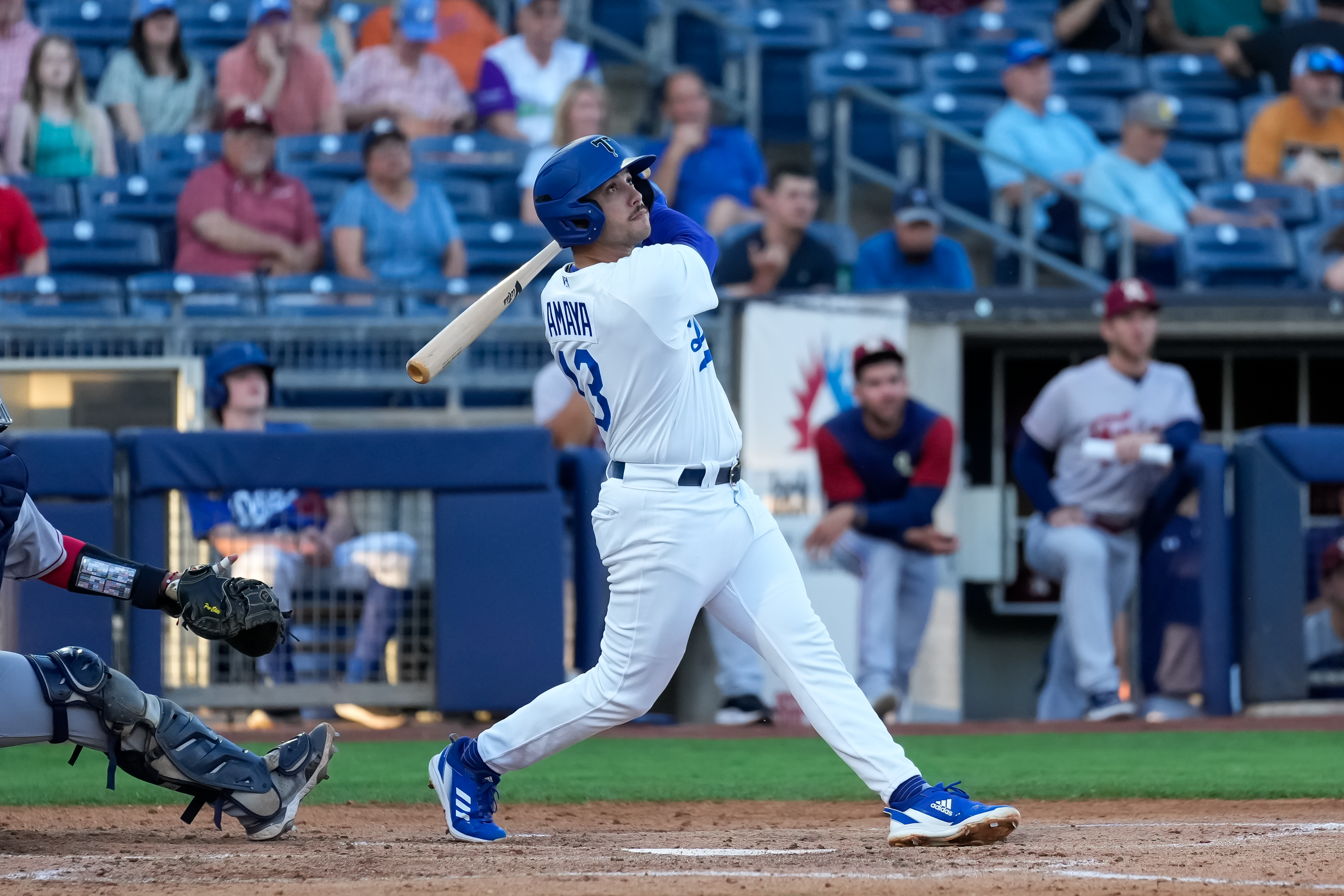
- Amaya with the Tulsa Drillers

Free agent
- Shortstop
- Born: September 3, 1998 (age 28); El Monte, California, U.S.
- Bats: Right Throws: Right

MLB debut
- June 18, 2023, for the Miami Marlins

MLB statistics (through 2025 season)
- Batting average: .147
- Home runs: 0
- Runs batted in: 13
- Stats at Baseball Reference

Teams
- Miami Marlins (2023); Houston Astros (2024); Chicago White Sox (2024–2025)

Jacob Carlos Amaya (born September 3, 1998) is an American professional baseball shortstop who is a free agent. He has previously played in Major League Baseball (MLB) for the Miami Marlins, Houston Astros, and Chicago White Sox.

== Career ==
=== Los Angeles Dodgers ===
The Los Angeles Dodgers selected Amaya in the 11th round, with the 340th overall selection, of the 2017 Major League Baseball draft out of South Hills High School in West Covina, California. He made his debut with the rookie–level Arizona League Dodgers in 2017, hitting .254 in 34 games. He split the 2018 season between the rookie–level Ogden Raptors and Single–A Great Lakes Loons, hitting .311 in 59 games. He spent 103 games with the Loons in 2019 before a promotion to the High–A Rancho Cucamonga Quakes for 21 games. Overall he hit .260.

Amaya did not play in a game 2020 due to the cancellation of the minor league season because of the COVID-19 pandemic. He returned to action in 2021, and played in 113 games with the Double–A Tulsa Drillers, hitting .216/.303/.343 with career–highs in home runs (12) and RBI (47). He was assigned to the Glendale Desert Dogs of the Arizona Fall League after the season and then added to the Dodgers 40-man roster. His season was split between the Drillers and the Triple-A Oklahoma City Dodgers. He hit a combined .261 in 133 games with 17 homers and 71 RBI.

=== Miami Marlins ===
On January 11, 2023, the Dodgers traded Amaya to the Miami Marlins for Miguel Rojas. Amaya was optioned to the Triple-A Jacksonville Jumbo Shrimp to begin the 2023 season. In 58 games, he hit .278/.346/.472 with nine home runs and 35 RBI. On June 17, Amaya was promoted to the major leagues for the first time. He made his major league debut the next day, recording his first MLB hit. Amaya played in four games for Miami in his rookie campaign, going 2–for–9 (.222) with no home runs, two RBI, and one stolen base.

Amaya was optioned to Triple–A Jacksonville to begin the 2024 season. On April 2, he was designated for assignment following the acquisition of Emmanuel Rivera.

=== Houston Astros ===
On April 6, 2024, Amaya was traded to the Houston Astros in exchange for Valente Bellozo. He made one appearance for Houston, flying out against New York Yankees pitcher Ron Marinaccio in his only at–bat. Amaya was designated for assignment by the Astros on August 24.

=== Chicago White Sox ===
On August 26, 2024, Amaya was claimed off waivers by the Chicago White Sox. In 23 games for Chicago, he batted .179/.225/.194 with no home runs, three RBI, and one stolen base. Amaya was designated for assignment by the White Sox on January 8, 2025.

On January 16, 2025, Amaya was claimed off waivers by the Baltimore Orioles. He was designated for assignment following the signing of Dylan Carlson on January 27. On February 3, Amaya was claimed back off waivers by the White Sox. In 33 appearances for Chicago, he batted .097/.119/.113 with seven RBI and two stolen bases. On May 16, Amaya was designated for assignment by the White Sox; he cleared waivers and was sent outright to the Triple-A Charlotte Knights the next day. On August 7, the White Sox added Amaya back to their active roster. He went 1-for-4 (.250) with one RBI in three games before being designated for assignment for a second time on August 15. Amaya cleared waivers and was sent outright to Charlotte on August 18. He elected free agency on October 3.

=== Arizona Diamondbacks ===
On December 5, 2025, Amaya signed a minor league contract with the Arizona Diamondbacks. He made 70 appearances for the Triple–A Reno Aces, slashing .253/.361/.420 with eight home runs, 36 RBI, and two stolen bases. Amaya was released by the Diamondbacks organization on August 6, 2026.

== Personal life ==
Amaya's grandfather Frank was also drafted by the Dodgers.
