= Zach Dezenzo =

American baseball player (born 2000)

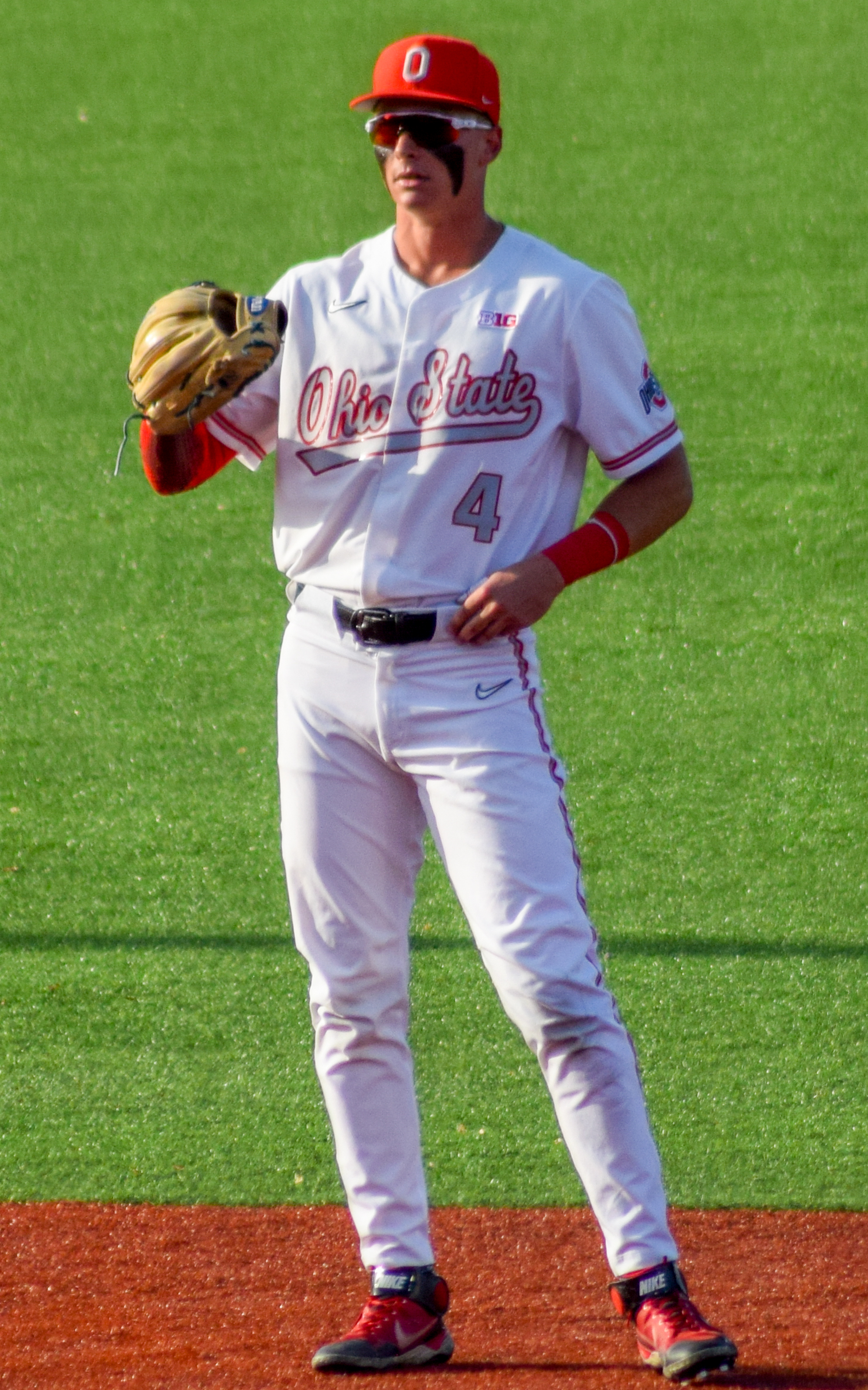
- Dezenzo at Ohio State in 2022

Houston Astros – No. 9
- Infielder
- Born: May 11, 2000 (age 26); Canton, Ohio, U.S.
- Bats: Right Throws: Right

MLB debut
- August 6, 2024, for the Houston Astros

MLB statistics (through 2026 season)
- Batting average: .234
- Home runs: 5
- Runs batted in: 21
- Stats at Baseball Reference

Teams
- Houston Astros (2024–present)

Zachary Jordan Dezenzo (born May 11, 2000) is an American professional baseball infielder for the Houston Astros of Major League Baseball (MLB). He made his MLB debut in 2024.

== Career ==
=== Amateur ===
Dezenzo attended Marlington High School in Alliance, Ohio, and Ohio State University, where he played college baseball for the Ohio State Buckeyes. He additionally played collegiate summer baseball for the Frederick Keys and Mahoning Valley Scrappers of the MLB Draft League.

=== Houston Astros ===
The Houston Astros selected Dezenzo in the 12th round, with the 373rd overall selection, of the 2022 Major League Baseball draft. Dezenzo made his professional debut with the Single–A Fayetteville Woodpeckers and started 2023 with the High–A Asheville Tourists.

Dezenzo began the 2024 season with the Double–A Corpus Christi Hooks, where he hit .222 with two home runs and seven RBI over 22 games. He was promoted to the Triple–A Sugar Land Space Cowboys, and hit .391 with four home runs and 13 RBI across 11 games. On August 6, 2024, Dezenzo was selected to the 40-man roster and promoted to the major leagues for the first time; the promotion also made Dezenzo the first MLB Draft League alumni to reach the majors. Between the 2024 and 2025 seasons, Dezenzo played winter league baseball for the Senadores de San Juan of the LBPRC in Puerto Rico.

Dezenzo made the Astros' 2025 Opening Day roster. In 34 appearances to begin the year, he hit .245 with two home runs, 10 RBI, and one stolen base. On June 1, 2025, Dezenzo was placed on the injured list with left hand inflammation. The injury was later specified as a capsule strain in his left hand. Dezenzo was transferred to the 60-day injured list on July 11. In 2026, Dezenzo appeared in 35 games for Houston and made 82 plate appearances, batting .213/.280/.307 with one hone run and three RBI. He made 28 appearaances in left field, starting 20 of those games.
