= Nick Hernandez =

American baseball player (born 1994)

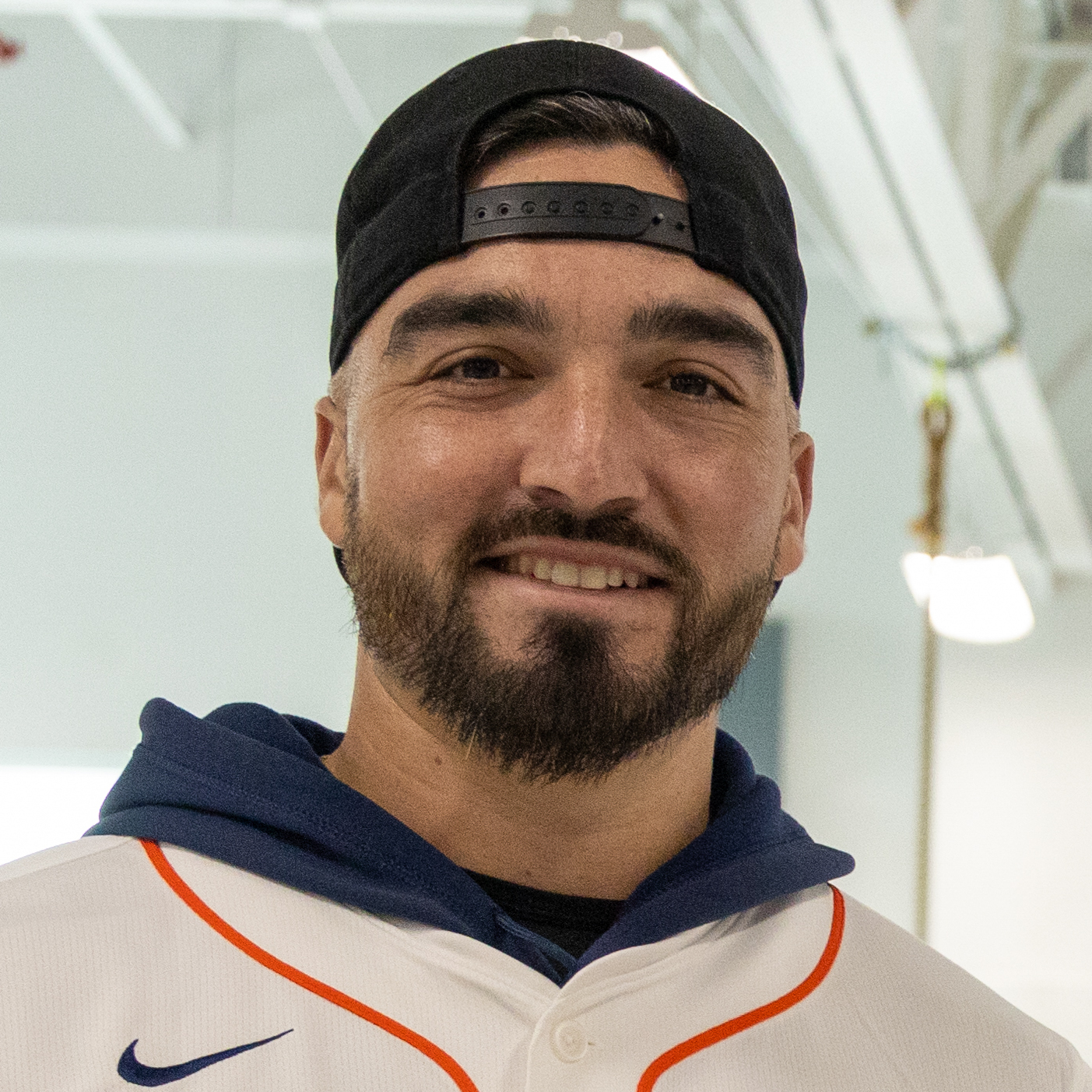
- Hernandez with the Houston Astros in 2025

Free agent
- Pitcher
- Born: December 30, 1994 (age 31); Missouri City, Texas, U.S.
- Bats: Right Throws: Right

MLB debut
- September 12, 2023, for the San Diego Padres

MLB statistics (through 2025 season)
- Win–loss record: 0–0
- Earned run average: 7.06
- Strikeouts: 26
- Stats at Baseball Reference

Teams
- San Diego Padres (2023); Houston Astros (2024–2025)

Nicholas Cody Hernandez (born December 30, 1994) is an American professional baseball pitcher who is a free agent. He has previously played in Major League Baseball (MLB) for the San Diego Padres and Houston Astros. He made his MLB debut in 2023.

== Career ==
=== Amateur career ===
Hernandez is from Missouri City, Texas. He graduated from Dulles High School in Sugar Land, Texas. Hernandez played college baseball for Alvin Community College for two seasons, and transferred to the University of Houston for the 2016 season, where he was the closer for the Houston Cougars.

=== Houston Astros ===
The Houston Astros selected Hernandez in the eighth round, with the 247th overall selection, of the 2016 Major League Baseball draft. He spent his first professional season with the Low–A Tri-City ValleyCats and Single–A Quad Cities River Bandits, accumulating a 1.73 ERA across 19 appearances. In 2017, Hernandez made 38 appearances out of the bullpen split between the High–A Buies Creek Astros and Double–A Corpus Christi Hooks, registering a combined 3.38 ERA with 70 strikeouts and 10 saves across 58 2/3 innings pitched. He underwent Tommy John surgery prior to the 2018 season and missed the entire year as a result.

Hernandez split the 2019 season between Corpus Christi and the High–A Fayetteville Woodpeckers, pitching to a combined 4.02 ERA with 37 strikeouts across 23 contests. He did not play in a game in 2020 due to the cancellation of the minor league season because of the COVID-19 pandemic. He returned to action in 2021 with Corpus Christi, also making one appearance in Triple–A. In 32 games for the Hooks, Hernandez recorded a 1.67 ERA with 68 strikeouts and 6 saves in 54 innings. In 2022, he spent the year with the Triple-A Sugar Land Space Cowboys, appearing in 48 games and posting a 5–5 record and 3.92 ERA with 77 strikeouts across 59 2/3 innings of work. Hernandez elected free agency following the season on November 10, 2022.

=== San Diego Padres ===
On February 3, 2023, Hernandez signed a minor league contract with the San Diego Padres. He began the 2023 season in Triple-A with the El Paso Chihuahuas.

On September 11, 2023, Hernandez was selected to the 40-man roster and promoted to the major leagues for the first time. He made his MLB debut the following day. In two appearances for San Diego, he allowed four runs on three hits with five strikeouts in three innings of work. Following the season on November 6, Hernandez was removed from the 40–man roster and sent outright to the Triple–A El Paso Chihuahuas; he elected free agency the same day.

Hernandez re-signed with the Padres on a minor league contract on January 26, 2024. In 17 games for Triple–A El Paso, he recorded a 1.90 ERA with 34 strikeouts across 23 2/3 innings pitched.

=== Houston Astros (second stint) ===
On June 4, 2024, the Padres traded Hernandez back to the Houston Astros in exchange for cash considerations. The next day, the Astros selected his contract, adding him to their active roster. In 5 appearances for Houston, Hernandez struggled to a 7.88 ERA with 10 strikeouts over 8 innings of work.

Hernandez was optioned to Triple-A Sugar Land to begin the 2025 season. In 10 appearances for Houston, he recorded a 5.06 ERA with 11 strikeouts across 10 2/3 innings pitched. On September 27, 2025, Hernandez was designated for assignment by the Astros. He elected free agency after clearing waivers on September 30.

=== Athletics ===
On December 30, 2025, Hernandez signed a minor league contract with the Athletics. In 34 games with Triple-A Las Vegas Aviators he threw 55 innings of relief going 4-1 with a 7.85 ERA and 54 strikeouts. He elected free agency on November 2.
