= Chas McCormick =

American baseball player (born 1995)

Pittsburgh Pirates
- Outfielder
- Born: April 19, 1995 (age 31); West Chester, Pennsylvania, U.S.
- Bats: Right Throws: Left

MLB debut
- April 1, 2021, for the Houston Astros

MLB statistics (through 2025 season)
- Batting average: .247
- Home runs: 56
- Runs batted in: 196
- Stats at Baseball Reference

Teams
- Houston Astros (2021–2025)

Career highlights and awards
- World Series champion (2022)

Chas Kane McCormick (born April 19, 1995) is an American professional baseball outfielder in the Pittsburgh Pirates organization. He has previously played in Major League Baseball (MLB) for the Houston Astros. McCormick attended Millersville University of Pennsylvania and played college baseball for the Marauders. He was drafted by the Astros in the 21st round of the 2017 MLB draft, and made his MLB debut in 2021.

== Early life ==
McCormick was born in West Chester, Pennsylvania, to Robert and Nancy Jo McCormick. At Henderson High School, he was four-time All-Ches-Mont League, and became the first player in school history to score 1,000 career points in basketball and record 100 career hits in baseball.

McCormick attended Millersville University of Pennsylvania, where he played college baseball for the Millersville Marauders in NCAA Division II. McCormick set Millersville career records in hits, runs, runs batted in (RBIs), and triples. He became the Pennsylvania State Athletic Conference's all-time hits leader, was named an All-Pennsylvania State Athletic Conference (PSAC) East player four times, was named the PSAC East Athlete of the Year, and was named an All-American.

== Professional career ==
=== Houston Astros ===
==== 2017–21 ====
The Houston Astros selected McCormick in the 21st round of the draft in 2017. He signed with a bonus of $1,000. In 2019, he was named an MiLB.com Houston Organization All Star. Through 2019, his minor league performance in 1,126 plate appearances had him batting .276/.360/.400 with 20 home runs and 41 steals (in 53 attempts).

McCormick made the Astros' wild card playoff roster in 2020. However, he did not make an appearance in the playoffs and was left off the playoff roster after a sweep of the Minnesota Twins.

On April 1, 2021, McCormick made his MLB debut against the Oakland Athletics as a defensive replacement for Michael Brantley. He hit his first home run on April 4 against Yusmeiro Petit. In 2021, he batted .257/.319/.447 with 14 home runs and 50 RBIs in 284 at bats.

==== 2022 ====
McCormick made the Astros' 2022 Opening Day roster. On May 6, he hit a two-run home run in the second inning versus the Detroit Tigers, the go-ahead run in a 3–2 Astros win. His double leading off the seventh inning on May 29 ended a perfect game bid by Texas Rangers' starter Martín Pérez. McCormick then scored the Astros' first run on a Yordan Alvarez single as the Astros won, 3–2. McCormick collected three hits versus the A's on May 31 to end a 2-for-23 slump, capped by a tie-breaking home run in the eighth inning versus Frankie Montas that resulted in a 3–1 Astros win. McCormick also hit an RBI single in the fifth inning.

On June 26, McCormick was optioned to the Triple–A Sugar Land Space Cowboys, but was recalled two days later to replace an injured Michael Brantley. McCormick drove in five runs versus the Chicago White Sox on August 18, hitting a home run in a 21–5 win, tied for second-highest scoring output in team history. On September 9, he hit a home run and drove in three runs versus the Los Angeles Angels to lead the Astros to a 4–3 win.

In the 2022 regular season, he batted .245/.332/.407 in 359 at bats, with 14 home runs and 44 RBIs. He played 64 games in left field, 60 in center field, and 17 in right field.

In Game 1 of the 2022 American League Championship Series (ALCS) versus the New York Yankees, McCormick hit a home run off Clarke Schmidt for the first of his career in the postseason. McCormick would also hit a go-ahead 2-run home run off of Gerrit Cole in Game 3 of the ALCS en route to an Astros sweep.

In the ninth inning of Game 5 of the World Series, McCormick's catch of a J. T. Realmuto fly ball at the wall at Citizens Bank Park in Philadelphia helped preserve a 3–2 lead for an eventual Astros win. After colliding with the fence, his landing left a starfish-shaped imprint on the warning track dirt on which the outline of his jersey number 20 was visible. The Astros defeated the Phillies the following game for their fourth win in the best-of-seven to give McCormick his first career World Series title.

==== 2023 ====
McCormick made the Astros’ 2023 Opening Day roster. On April 18, 2023, McCormick was placed on the 10-day injured list for lower back tightness. On April 29, McCormick was sent on a rehab assignment with the Double-A Corpus Christi Hooks. On May 8, McCormick was activated by the Astros from the 10-day injured list.

McCormick put together the best month of his career in July, slashing .351/.440/.688 with six home runs and 23 RBIs while posting a 1.128 OPS in 22 games. Following a weekend series after the All-Star break, July 14–16, 2023, McCormick was named American League (AL) Player of the Week for the first time. He went 7-for-11, batting .636, hitting an OPS of 2.188, three home runs, drove in five runs, scored seven times and drew three walks. On July 24, McCormick homered, doubled, and drove in a career-best six RBI to lead the Astros to a 10–9 win over the Rangers.

He followed up his career month with his second multi-homer game of the season on August 2 against the Cleveland Guardians, driving in all three Astros runs in a tight 3–2 victory.

For the 2023 regular season, McCormick played in 115 games and batted careers-highs of .273/.353/.489/.842. Other career-highs established were 457 plate appearances, 110 hits, 59 runs scored, 17 doubles, 22 home runs, 70 RBI, 19 stolen bases and 197 total bases. He ranked sixth in the AL in both win probability added (WPA, 3.4) and championship WPA (2.4), and tenth in base out runs added (25.97, RE/24). On defense he ranked fifth in the AL with 14 total zone runs. He played 59 games in left field, 55 in center field, and 24 in right field.

==== 2024 ====
The Astros placed McCormick on the 10-day injured list on May 1, 2024, due to a right hamstring injury, and reinstated him on May 22. On August 28, the Astros optioned McCormick to Sugar Land, and recalled him on September 2. After sustaining a fracture in his right hand running out a fly ball versus the Oakland Athletics, he was placed on the 10-day injured list on September 12. McCormick appeared in 94 games in 2024, batting a career-low .211/.271/.306 with 5 home runs, 27 RBI, and 8 stolen bases.

==== 2025 ====
On January 9, 2025, the Astros signed McCormick to a $3.4 million contract for the season, avoiding arbitration. On May 31, the Astros placed McCormick on the 10-day injured list due to a left oblique strain. In a blowout loss to the Detroit Tigers on August 18, McCormick came in to pitch and recorded his first career strikeout against Jake Rogers. In 64 appearances for Houston on the year, he batted .210/.279/.290 with one home run, five RBI, and two stolen bases. On November 6, McCormick was removed from the 40-man roster and sent outright to Triple-A Sugar Land, but rejected the assignment and elected free agency.

=== Chicago Cubs ===
On January 22, 2026, McCormick signed a minor league contract with the Chicago Cubs. He was released by the Cubs on July 3. However, McCormick re-signed with the Cubs on a new minor league contract on July 6. In 102 games with Triple-A Iowa Cubs he batted .285/.383/.468 with 14 home runs, 59 RBIs and 17 stolen bases. He elected free agency on November 2.

=== Pittsburgh Pirates ===
On November 16, 2026, McCormick signed a minor league contract with the Pittsburgh Pirates.

== Player profile ==
As a right-handed batter and left-handed thrower, McCormick was one of two position players with this characteristic to play in the major leagues in 2023. Teammate Jake Meyers was the other. From 2000 to 2022, twenty-nine different seasons with at least 100 games were logged by position players in the major leagues with this combination of batting and throwing handedness, and McCormick logged two.
