= 2017 Major League Baseball draft =

Major League Baseball draft

General information
- Date: June 12–14, 2017
- Location: Secaucus, New Jersey
- Network: MLB Network

Overview
- 1,215 total selections
- First selection: Royce Lewis; Minnesota Twins
- First round selections: 36

The 2017 Major League Baseball draft began on June 12, 2017. The draft assigned amateur baseball players to MLB teams. The first 36 picks, including the first round and compensatory picks, were broadcast on MLB Network on June 12, while the remainder of the draft was live streamed on MLB.com on June 13 and 14.

With the worst record in the 2016 MLB season, the Minnesota Twins received the first overall pick. Compensation picks were distributed for players who did not sign from the 2016 MLB draft. Also, fourteen small-market teams competed in a lottery for additional competitive balance picks, with six teams receiving an additional pick after the first round, and eight teams receiving an additional pick after the second round. The Twins selected Royce Lewis with the first overall selection.

The St. Louis Cardinals forfeited its top two selections (numbers 56 and 75 in the second and competitive balance round B respectively) and $2 million in damages to the Houston Astros when Commissioner Rob Manfred adjudicated a computer system hacking scandal on January 30, 2017.

== First round selections ==
Key
	All-Star/All-MLB Team
*	Player did not sign

Pick	Player	Team	Position	School
1	Royce Lewis	Minnesota Twins	Shortstop	JSerra Catholic High School (CA)
2	Hunter Greene	Cincinnati Reds	Pitcher	Notre Dame High School (CA)
3	MacKenzie Gore	San Diego Padres	Pitcher	Whiteville High School (NC)
4	Brendan McKay	Tampa Bay Rays	First baseman/Pitcher	Louisville
5	Kyle Wright	Atlanta Braves	Pitcher	Vanderbilt
6	Austin Beck	Oakland Athletics	Outfielder	North Davidson High School (NC)
7	Pavin Smith	Arizona Diamondbacks	First baseman	Virginia
8	Adam Haseley	Philadelphia Phillies	Outfielder	Virginia
9	Keston Hiura	Milwaukee Brewers	Second baseman	UC Irvine
10	Jo Adell	Los Angeles Angels	Outfielder	Ballard High School (KY)
11	Jake Burger	Chicago White Sox	Third baseman	Missouri State
12	Shane Baz	Pittsburgh Pirates	Pitcher	Concordia Lutheran High School (TX)
13	Trevor Rogers	Miami Marlins	Pitcher	Carlsbad High School (NM)
14	Nick Pratto	Kansas City Royals	First baseman	Huntington Beach High School (CA)
15	J. B. Bukauskas	Houston Astros	Pitcher	North Carolina
16	Clarke Schmidt	New York Yankees	Pitcher	South Carolina
17	Evan White	Seattle Mariners	First baseman	Kentucky
18	Alex Faedo	Detroit Tigers	Pitcher	Florida
19	Heliot Ramos	San Francisco Giants	Outfielder	Leadership Christian Academy (PR)
20	David Peterson	New York Mets	Pitcher	Oregon
21	DL Hall	Baltimore Orioles	Pitcher	Valdosta High School (GA)
22	Logan Warmoth	Toronto Blue Jays	Shortstop	North Carolina
23	Jeren Kendall	Los Angeles Dodgers	Outfielder	Vanderbilt
24	Tanner Houck	Boston Red Sox	Pitcher	Missouri
25	Seth Romero	Washington Nationals	Pitcher	Houston
26	Bubba Thompson	Texas Rangers	Outfielder	McGill–Toolen Catholic High School (AL)
27	Brendon Little	Chicago Cubs	Pitcher	State College of Florida, Manatee–Sarasota

=== Compensatory round ===
Pick	Player	Team	Position	School
28	Nate Pearson	Toronto Blue Jays (Note: Compensation pick for the Cleveland Indians signing Edwin Encarnación)	Pitcher	College of Central Florida
29	Christopher Seise	Texas Rangers (Note: Compensation pick for the Colorado Rockies signing Ian Desmond)	Shortstop	West Orange High School (FL)
30	Alex Lange	Chicago Cubs (Note: Compensation pick for the St. Louis Cardinals signing Dexter Fowler)	Pitcher	LSU

=== Competitive balance round A ===
Pick	Player	Team	Position	School
31	Drew Rasmussen*	Tampa Bay Rays	Pitcher	Oregon State
32	Jeter Downs	Cincinnati Reds	Shortstop	Monsignor Edward Pace High School (FL)
33	Kevin Merrell	Oakland Athletics	Shortstop	South Florida
34	Tristen Lutz	Milwaukee Brewers	Outfielder	James Martin High School (TX)
35	Brent Rooker	Minnesota Twins	Outfielder	Mississippi State
36	Brian Miller	Miami Marlins	Outfielder	North Carolina

== Other notable selections ==
Round	Pick	Player	Team	Position	School
2	38	Stuart Fairchild	Cincinnati Reds	Outfielder	Wake Forest
2	39	Luis Campusano	San Diego Padres	Catcher	Cross Creek High School (GA)
2	40	Michael Mercado	Tampa Bay Rays	Pitcher	Westview High School (CA)
2	41	Drew Waters	Atlanta Braves	Outfielder	Etowah High School (GA)
2	43	Greg Deichmann	Oakland Athletics	Outfielder	LSU
2	44	Drew Ellis	Arizona Diamondbacks	Third baseman	Louisville
2	45	Spencer Howard	Philadelphia Phillies	Pitcher	Cal Poly
2	47	Griffin Canning	Los Angeles Angels	Pitcher	UCLA
2	48	Ryan Vilade	Colorado Rockies	Shortstop	Stillwater High School (OK)
2	49	Gavin Sheets	Chicago White Sox	First baseman	Wake Forest
2	50	Cal Mitchell	Pittsburgh Pirates	Outfielder	Rancho Bernardo High School (CA)
2	51	Joe Dunand	Miami Marlins	Shortstop	NC State
2	52	MJ Melendez	Kansas City Royals	Catcher	Westminster Christian School (FL)
2	53	Joe Perez	Houston Astros	Third baseman	Archbishop Edward A. McCarthy High School (FL)
2	54	Matt Sauer	New York Yankees	Pitcher	Righetti High School (CA)
2	55	Sam Carlson	Seattle Mariners	Pitcher	Burnsville High School (MN)
2	56	Corbin Martin	Houston Astros	Pitcher	Texas A&M
2	58	Jacob Gonzalez	San Francisco Giants	Third baseman	Chaparral High School (AZ)
2	59	Mark Vientos	New York Mets	Third baseman	American Heritage School (FL)
2	60	Adam Hall	Baltimore Orioles	Shortstop	A. B. Lucas Secondary School (ON)
2	61	Hagen Danner	Toronto Blue Jays	Catcher	Huntington Beach High School (CA)
2	65	Wil Crowe	Washington Nationals	Pitcher	South Carolina
2	66	Hans Crouse	Texas Rangers	Pitcher	Dana Hills High School (CA)
2	67	Cory Abbott	Chicago Cubs	Pitcher	Loyola Marymount
B	68	Daulton Varsho	Arizona Diamondbacks	Catcher	Milwaukee
B	69	Blake Hunt	San Diego Padres	Catcher	Mater Dei High School (CA)
B	70	Tommy Doyle	Colorado Rockies	Pitcher	Virginia
B	71	Tyler Freeman	Cleveland Indians	Shortstop	Etiwanda High School (CA)
B	74	Zac Lowther	Baltimore Orioles	Pitcher	Xavier
B	75	J. J. Matijevic	Houston Astros	Second baseman	Arizona
3	76	Blayne Enlow	Minnesota Twins	Pitcher	St. Amant High School (LA)
3	79	Taylor Walls	Tampa Bay Rays	Shortstop	Florida State
3	80	Freddy Tarnok	Atlanta Braves	Pitcher	Riverview High School (FL)
3	81	Nick Allen	Oakland Athletics	Shortstop	Francis Parker School (CA)
3	82	Matt Tabor	Arizona Diamondbacks	Pitcher	Milton Academy (MA)
3	83	Connor Seabold	Philadelphia Phillies	Pitcher	Cal State Fullerton
3	84	KJ Harrison	Milwaukee Brewers	Catcher	Oregon State
3	87	Luis González	Chicago White Sox	Outfielder	New Mexico
3	91	Tyler Ivey	Houston Astros	Pitcher	Grayson College
3	92	Trevor Stephan	New York Yankees	Pitcher	Arkansas
3	93	Wyatt Mills	Seattle Mariners	Pitcher	Gonzaga
3	94	Scott Hurst	St. Louis Cardinals	Outfielder	Cal State Fullerton
3	98	Mike Baumann	Baltimore Orioles	Pitcher	Jacksonville
3	99	Riley Adams	Toronto Blue Jays	Catcher	San Diego
3	100	Connor Wong	Los Angeles Dodgers	Catcher	Houston
3	102	Johnathan Rodríguez	Cleveland Indians	Outfielder	Carlos Beltran Baseball Academy (PR)
3	103	Nick Raquet	Washington Nationals	Pitcher	William & Mary
3	104	Matt Whatley	Texas Rangers	Catcher	Oral Roberts
3	105	Keegan Thompson	Chicago Cubs	Pitcher	Auburn
4	106	Charlie Barnes	Minnesota Twins	Pitcher	Clemson
4	109	Drew Strotman	Tampa Bay Rays	Pitcher	Saint Mary's
4	111	Will Toffey	Oakland Athletics	Third baseman	Vanderbilt
4	113	Jake Scheiner	Philadelphia Phillies	Third baseman	Houston
4	117	Lincoln Henzman	Chicago White Sox	Pitcher	Louisville
4	118	Jason Delay	Pittsburgh Pirates	Catcher	Vanderbilt
4	121	Peter Solomon	Houston Astros	Pitcher	Notre Dame
4	122	Canaan Smith-Njigba	New York Yankees	Outfielder	Rockwall-Heath High School (TX)
4	123	Seth Elledge	Seattle Mariners	Pitcher	Dallas Baptist
4	124	Kramer Robertson	St. Louis Cardinals	Shortstop	LSU
4	127	Tony Dibrell	New York Mets	Pitcher	Kennesaw State
4	129	Kevin Smith	Toronto Blue Jays	Shortstop	Maryland
4	132	Ernie Clement	Cleveland Indians	Infielder	Virginia
4	135	Erich Uelmen	Chicago Cubs	Pitcher	Cal Poly
5	137	Mac Sceroler	Cincinnati Reds	Pitcher	Southeastern Louisiana
5	139	Josh Fleming	Tampa Bay Rays	Pitcher	Webster
5	140	Bruce Zimmermann	Atlanta Braves	Pitcher	University of Mount Olive
5	142	Buddy Kennedy	Arizona Diamondbacks	Third baseman	Millville High School (NJ)
5	147	Tyler Johnson	Chicago White Sox	Pitcher	South Carolina
5	152	Glenn Otto	New York Yankees	Pitcher	Rice
5	153	David Banuelos	Seattle Mariners	Catcher	Long Beach State
5	156	Jason Bahr	San Francisco Giants	Pitcher	Central Florida
5	159	Cullen Large	Toronto Blue Jays	Third baseman	William & Mary
5	164	Jacob Latz	Texas Rangers	Pitcher	Kent State
5	165	Nelson Velázquez	Chicago Cubs	Outfielder	International Baseball Academy (PR)
6	173	Dalton Guthrie	Philadelphia Phillies	Shortstop	Florida
6	177	Kade McClure	Chicago White Sox	Pitcher	Louisville
6	178	Cody Bolton	Pittsburgh Pirates	Pitcher	Tracy High School (CA)
6	180	Tyler Zuber	Kansas City Royals	Pitcher	Arkansas State
6	185	Dane Myers	Detroit Tigers	Pitcher	Rice
6	186	Bryce Johnson	San Francisco Giants	Outfielder	Sam Houston State
6	188	Mason McCoy	Baltimore Orioles	Shortstop	Iowa
6	195	Jeremiah Estrada	Chicago Cubs	Pitcher	Palm Desert High School (CA)
7	197	Mark Kolozsvary	Cincinnati Reds	Catcher	Florida
7	198	Nick Margevicius	San Diego Padres	Pitcher	Rider
7	199	Hunter Schryver	Tampa Bay Rays	Pitcher	Villanova
7	201	Parker Dunshee	Oakland Athletics	Pitcher	Wake Forest
7	202	José Caballero	Arizona Diamondbacks	Infielder	Chipola College
7	203	Nick Maton	Philadelphia Phillies	Shortstop	Lincoln Land Community College
7	204	Bowden Francis	Milwaukee Brewers	Pitcher	Chipola College
7	206	Lucas Gilbreath	Colorado Rockies	Pitcher	Minnesota
7	207	Evan Skoug	Chicago White Sox	Catcher	TCU
7	208	Jared Oliva	Pittsburgh Pirates	Outfielder	Arizona
7	209	Sean Guenther	Miami Marlins	Pitcher	Notre Dame
7	210	Brewer Hicklen	Kansas City Royals	Outfielder	UAB
7	211	Parker Mushinski	Houston Astros	Pitcher	Texas Tech
7	214	Chase Pinder	St. Louis Cardinals	Outfielder	Clemson
7	220	Zach Pop	Los Angeles Dodgers	Pitcher	Kentucky
7	222	Kirk McCarty	Cleveland Indians	Pitcher	Southern Miss
7	223	Jackson Tetreault	Washington Nationals	Pitcher	State College of Florida, Manatee–Sarasota
8	226	Bryan Sammons	Minnesota Twins	Pitcher	Western Carolina
8	229	Riley O'Brien	Tampa Bay Rays	Pitcher	College of Idaho
8	236	Bret Boswell	Colorado Rockies	Outfielder	Texas
8	238	Blake Weiman	Pittsburgh Pirates	Pitcher	Kansas
8	241	Corey Julks	Houston Astros	Outfielder	Houston
8	249	Kacy Clemens	Toronto Blue Jays	First baseman	Texas
8	250	Rylan Bannon	Los Angeles Dodgers	Pitcher	Xavier
8	252	Eli Morgan	Cleveland Indians	Pitcher	Gonzaga
9	256	Mark Contreras	Minnesota Twins	Outfielder	UC Riverside
9	257	Packy Naughton	Cincinnati Reds	Pitcher	Virginia Tech
9	266	Sean Bouchard	Colorado Rockies	First baseman	UCLA
9	268	Bligh Madris	Pittsburgh Pirates	Outfielder	Colorado Mesa
9	271	Michael Papierski	Houston Astros	Catcher	LSU
9	274	Evan Kruczynski	St. Louis Cardinals	Pitcher	East Carolina
9	279	Zach Logue	Toronto Blue Jays	Pitcher	Kentucky
9	282	James Karinchak	Cleveland Indians	Pitcher	Bryant
10	286	Calvin Faucher	Minnesota Twins	Pitcher	UC Irvine
10	289	Phoenix Sanders	Tampa Bay Rays	Pitcher	South Florida
10	293	Connor Brogdon	Philadelphia Phillies	Pitcher	Lewis–Clark State College
10	294	Alec Bettinger	Milwaukee Brewers	Pitcher	Virginia
10	298	Beau Sulser	Pittsburgh Pirates	Pitcher	Dartmouth
10	301	Kyle Serrano	Houston Astros	Pitcher	Tennessee
10	310	Zach Reks	Los Angeles Dodgers	Outfielder	Kentucky
10	314	John King	Texas Rangers	Pitcher	Houston
10	317	Jared Solomon	Cincinnati Reds	Pitcher	Lackawanna College
11	327	Will Kincanon	Chicago White Sox	Pitcher	Indiana State
11	331	Brandon Bielak	Houston Astros	Pitcher	Notre Dame
11	333	J. P. Sears	Seattle Mariners	Pitcher	The Citadel
11	334	Evan Mendoza	St. Louis Cardinals	Third baseman	NC State
11	340	Jacob Amaya	Los Angeles Dodgers	Shortstop	South Hills High School (CA)
12	346	Bailey Ober	Minnesota Twins	Pitcher	College of Charleston
12	347	Tommy Mace*	Cincinnati Reds	Pitcher	Sunlake High School (FL)
12	360	Collin Snider	Kansas City Royals	Pitcher	Vanderbilt
12	363	Darren McCaughan	Seattle Mariners	Pitcher	Long Beach State
12	365	Will Vest	Detroit Tigers	Pitcher	Stephen F. Austin State
12	370	Andre Jackson	Los Angeles Dodgers	Pitcher	Utah
13	388	Tristan Gray	Pittsburgh Pirates	Second baseman	Rice
13	391	Jake Meyers	Houston Astros	Outfielder	Nebraska
13	392	Eric Wagaman	New York Yankees	First baseman	Orange Coast College
13	400	Marshall Kasowski	Los Angeles Dodgers	Pitcher	West Texas A&M
14	411	Garrett Mitchell*	Oakland Athletics	Outfielder	Orange Lutheran High School (CA)
14	414	Gage Workman*	Milwaukee Brewers	Third baseman	Basha High School (AZ)
15	438	Cole Bellinger	San Diego Padres	Pitcher	Hamilton High School (AZ)
15	450	Robert Garcia	Kansas City Royals	Pitcher	UC Davis
15	453	Tommy Romero	Seattle Mariners	Pitcher	Eastern Florida State College
15	458	J. C. Escarra	Baltimore Orioles	First baseman	FIU
15	459	Ryan Noda	Toronto Blue Jays	Outfielder	Cincinnati
15	462	Kyle Nelson	Cleveland Indians	Pitcher	UC Santa Barbara
15	463	Bryce Montes de Oca	Washington Nationals	Pitcher	Missouri
15	464	Ricky Vanasco	Texas Rangers	Pitcher	Williston High School (FL)
15	465	Jared Young	Chicago Cubs	First baseman	Old Dominion
16	473	Kyle Dohy	Philadelphia Phillies	Pitcher	Cal Poly Pomona
16	476	Alan Trejo	Colorado Rockies	Second baseman	San Diego State
16	478	Hunter Stratton	Pittsburgh Pirates	Pitcher	Walters State Community College
16	484	Jake Walsh	St. Louis Cardinals	Pitcher	Florida Southern
16	488	Logan Allen*	Baltimore Orioles	Pitcher	University High School (FL)
16	491	Kutter Crawford	Boston Red Sox	Pitcher	Florida Gulf Coast
17	508	Mason Martin	Seattle Mariners	First baseman	Southridge High School (WA)
17	518	Greg Jones*	Baltimore Orioles	Shortstop	Cary High School (NC)
18	542	Garrett Whitlock	New York Yankees	Pitcher	UAB
19	557	Seth Lonsway*	Cincinnati Reds	Pitcher	Celina High School (OH)
19	565	Isaac Mattson	Los Angeles Angels	Pitcher	Pittsburgh
19	570	Korry Howell*	Kansas City Royals	Outfielder	Kirkwood Community College
19	577	CJ Van Eyk*	New York Mets	Pitcher	Steinbrenner High School (FL)
20	588	Duke Ellis*	San Diego Padres	Center fielder	Panola College
20	606	Keaton Winn*	San Francisco Giants	Pitcher	Iowa Western CC
20	610	Donovan Casey*	Los Angeles Dodgers	Outfielder	Boston College
20	611	David Durden	Boston Red Sox	Center fielder	Emanuel County Institute (GA)
20	613	Jake Cousins	Washington Nationals	Pitcher	Penn
21	619	Paul Campbell	Tampa Bay Rays	Pitcher	Clemson
21	624	Dylan File	Milwaukee Brewers	Pitcher	Dixie State
21	628	Robbie Glendinning	Pittsburgh Pirates	Third baseman	Missouri
21	631	Chas McCormick	Houston Astros	Outfielder	Millersville University of Pennsylvania
21	644	Daniel Robert	Texas Rangers	Pitcher	Auburn
22	651	Bryce Conley	Oakland Athletics	Pitcher	Georgia State
22	662	Janson Junk	New York Yankees	Pitcher	Seattle
23	682	Matt Peacock	Arizona Diamondbacks	Pitcher	South Alabama
23	684	Cam Robinson	Milwaukee Brewers	Pitcher	University High School (FL)
23	693	Sam Delaplane	Seattle Mariners	Pitcher	Eastern Michigan
25	764	Aaron Ashby*	Texas Rangers	Pitcher	Crowder College
26	768	Daniel Cabrera*	San Diego Padres	Outfielder	Parkview Baptist High School (LA)
26	774	Carson McCusker*	Milwaukee Brewers	Right fielder	Folsom Lake College
26	781	Josh Rojas	Houston Astros	Second baseman	Hawaii
27	814	Kodi Whitley	St. Louis Cardinals	Pitcher	Mount Olive
27	825	Darius Vines*	Chicago Cubs	Pitcher	Oxnard College
28	838	Matt Seelinger	Pittsburgh Pirates	Pitcher	Farmingdale State
28	849	Davis Schneider	Toronto Blue Jays	Third baseman	Eastern Regional High School (VA)
29	856	Griffin Roberts*	Minnesota Twins	Pitcher	Wake Forest
29	860	Cade Cavalli*	Atlanta Braves	Pitcher	Bixby High School (OK)
29	862	Tarik Skubal*	Arizona Diamondbacks	Pitcher	Seattle
29	872	Tristan Beck*	New York Yankees	Pitcher	Stanford
29	884	Blaine Knight*	Texas Rangers	Pitcher	Arkansas
30	888	Chandler Seagle	San Diego Padres	Catcher	Appalachian State
30	889	Gavin Williams*	Tampa Bay Rays	Pitcher	Cape Fear High School (NC)
30	895	Jeremy Beasley	Los Angeles Angels	Pitcher	Clemson
30	902	Jake Mangum*	New York Yankees	Outfielder	Mississippi State
30	910	Chris Roller	Los Angeles Dodgers	Outfielder	McLennan Community College
30	914	Ryan Dorow	Texas Rangers	Infielder	Adrian College
31	920	Ryan Miller*	Atlanta Braves	Pitcher	Clemson
31	933	Ryan Costello*	Seattle Mariners	Third baseman	Central Connecticut
31	942	Asa Lacy*	Cleveland Indians	Pitcher	Tivy High School (TX)
31	944	Griff McGarry*	Texas Rangers	Pitcher	Menlo Schoo (CA)
32	948	Matthew Batten	San Diego Padres	Infielder	Quinnipiac
32	950	Reid Detmers*	Atlanta Braves	Pitcher	Glenwood High School (IL)
32	955	David MacKinnon	Los Angeles Angels	First baseman	Hartford
32	960	Andrew Beckwith	Kansas City Royals	Pitcher	Coastal Carolina
32	962	Alika Williams*	New York Yankees	Shortstop	Rancho Bernardo High School (CA)
32	965	Drew Carlton	Detroit Tigers	Pitcher	Florida State
33	978	Caleb Boushley	San Diego Padres	Pitcher	Wisconsin–La Crosse
33	980	Chris McMahon*	Atlanta Braves	Pitcher	West Chester Rustin High School (PA)
33	983	Ben Brown*	Philadelphia Phillies	Pitcher	Ward Melville High School (NY)
33	1000	Brett de Geus	Los Angeles Dodgers	Pitcher	Cabrillo College
34	1006	Max Meyer*	Minnesota Twins	Pitcher	Woodbury High School (MN)
34	1013	Kyle Hurt*	Philadelphia Phillies	Pitcher	Torrey Pines High School (CA)
34	1014	Garrett Crochet*	Milwaukee Brewers	Pitcher	Ocean Springs High School (MS)
34	1027	Jake Eder*	New York Mets	Pitcher	Calvary Christian Academy (FL)
34	1033	Bennett Sousa*	Washington Nationals	Pitcher	Virginia
35	1049	Tyler Holton*	Miami Marlins	Pitcher	Florida State
35	1055	Jeff Criswell*	Detroit Tigers	Pitcher	Portage Central High School (MI)
35	1062	Spencer Strider*	Cleveland Indians	Pitcher	Christian Academy of Knoxville (TN)
36	1081	Josh Breaux*	Houston Astros	Catcher	McLennan Community College
36	1082	Andrew Abbott*	New York Yankees	Pitcher	Halifax County High School (VA)
36	1083	Heston Kjerstad*	Seattle Mariners	Outfielder	Randall High School (TX)
36	1084	Michael Brdar	St. Louis Cardinals	Shortstop	Michigan
36	1086	Joey Marciano	San Francisco Giants	Pitcher	Southern Illinois
36	1091	Rio Gomez	Boston Red Sox	Pitcher	Arizona
36	1093	Gabe Klobosits	Washington Nationals	Pitcher	Auburn
37	1095	Tanner Allen*	Chicago Cubs	Outfielder	UMS-Wright Preparatory School (AL)
37	1096	Patrick Bailey*	Minnesota Twins	Catcher	Wesleyan Christian Academy (NC)
37	1103	Edouard Julien*	Philadelphia Phillies	Second baseman	Cardinal Roy Secondary School (QC)
37	1110	Trevor Hauver*	Kansas City Royals	Second baseman	Perry High School (AZ)
37	1112	Tanner Burns*	New York Yankees	Pitcher	Decatur High School (AL)
37	1113	Jesse Franklin V*	Seattle Mariners	Outfielder	Seattle Preparatory School (WA)
37	1117	Josh Walker	New York Mets	Pitcher	New Haven
37	1122	Austin Martin*	Cleveland Indians	Outfielder	Trinity Christian Academy (FL)
38	1129	J. J. Schwarz*	Tampa Bay Rays	Catcher	Florida
38	1132	Emerson Hancock*	Arizona Diamondbacks	Pitcher	Cairo High School (GA)
38	1148	Bobby Miller*	Baltimore Orioles	Pitcher	McHenry West High School (IL)
38	1155	Russell Smith*	Chicago Cubs	Pitcher	Midlothian High School (TX)
39	1156	Jonny DeLuca*	Minnesota Twins	Center fielder	Agoura High School (CA)
39	1172	Andrew Nardi*	New York Yankees	Pitcher	Ventura College
39	1175	Jack Leftwich*	Detroit Tigers	Pitcher	TNXL Academy (FL)
40	1188	Chad Stevens*	San Diego Padres	Third baseman	Gig Harbor High School (WA)
40	1210	Clayton Andrews*	Los Angeles Dodgers	Pitcher	Cabrillo College

== Notes ==
Compensation picks
