= Jake Meyers =

American baseball player (born 1996)

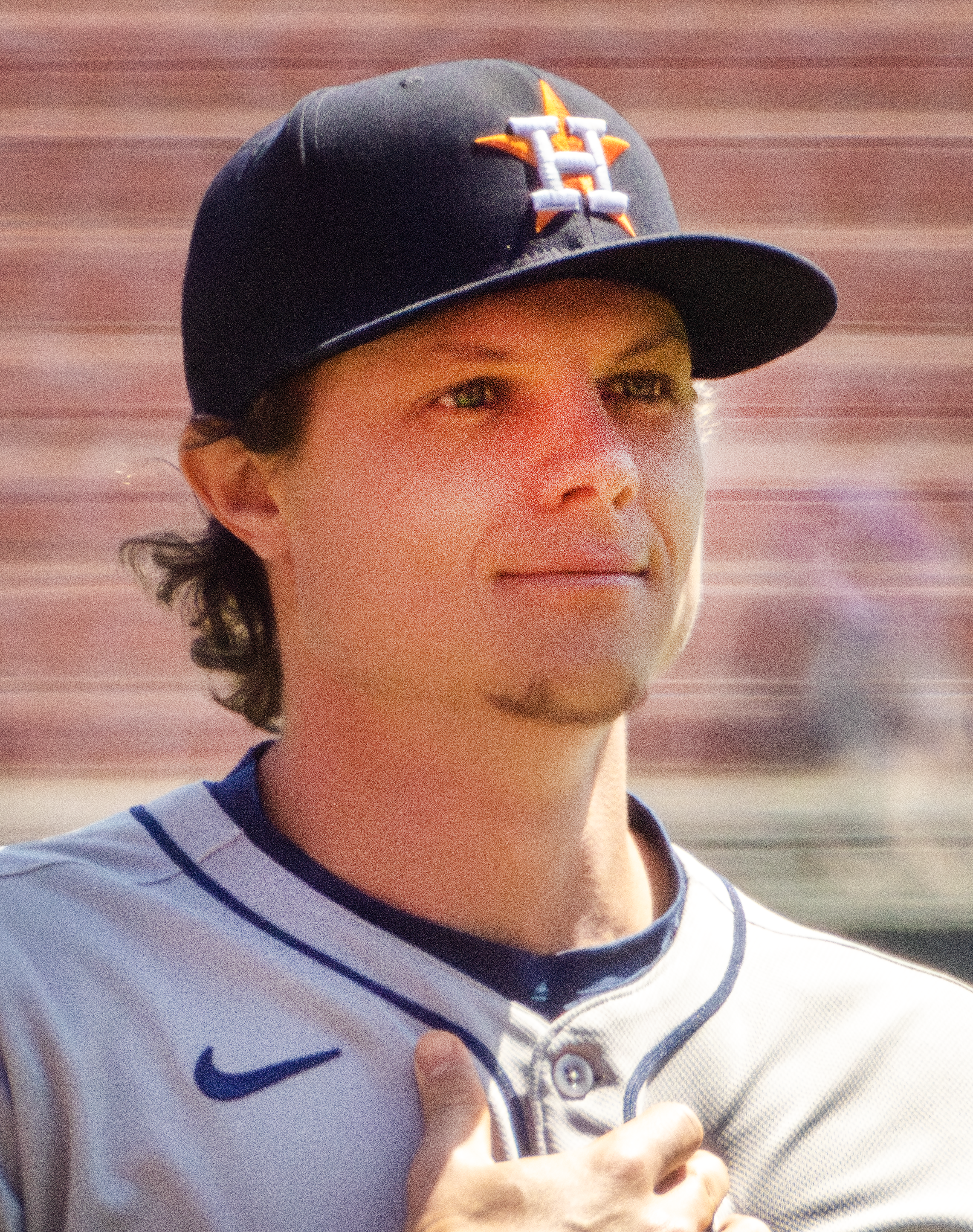
- Meyers with the Houston Astros in 2025

Free agent
- Outfielder
- Born: June 18, 1996 (age 30); Omaha, Nebraska, U.S.
- Bats: Right Throws: Left

MLB debut
- August 1, 2021, for the Houston Astros

MLB statistics (through 2026 season)
- Batting average: .241
- Home runs: 36
- Runs batted in: 172
- Stats at Baseball Reference

Teams
- Houston Astros (2021–2026)

Career highlights and awards
- World Series champion (2022)

Jacob Berkshire Meyers (born June 18, 1996) is an American professional baseball outfielder who is a free agent. He has previously played in Major League Baseball (MLB) for the Houston Astros. Meyers played college baseball for the Nebraska Cornhuskers. He was selected in the 13th round by the Astros in the 2017 MLB draft. He made his MLB debut in 2021.

== Early life and amateur career ==
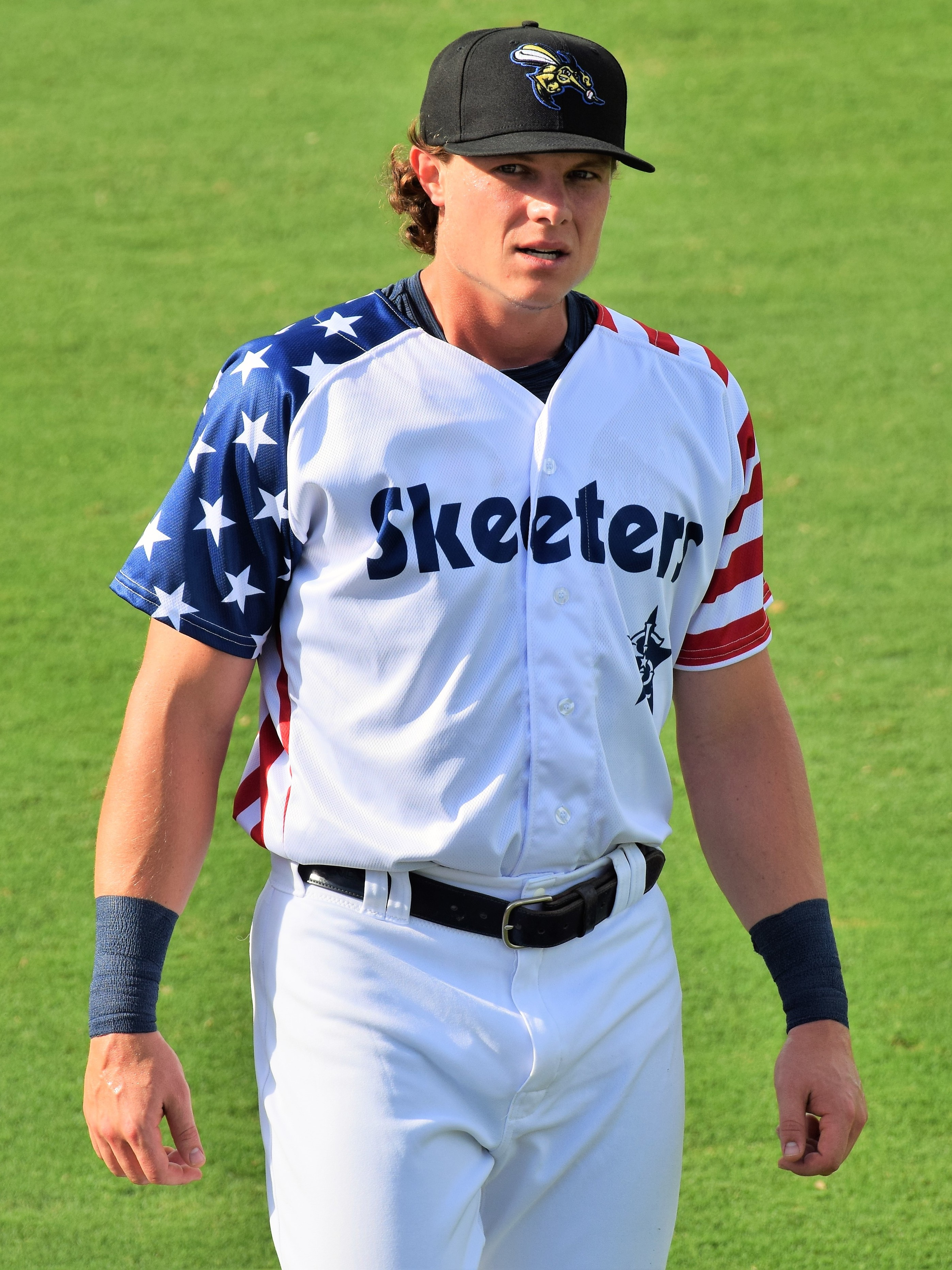
Meyers with the Sugar Land Skeeters in 2021.

Jacob Berkshire Meyers was born to Paul and Laurie Meyers on June 18, 1996, in Omaha, Nebraska. Paul was selected by the San Francisco Giants in the fourth round of the 1986 draft and spent multiple seasons playing Minor League Baseball but never made it to the majors. Meyers has one sister, Lauren. He attended Westside High School, where he played baseball and basketball. Westside's baseball team won the Class A state championship in Meyers' junior and senior seasons, while the basketball team finished runner-up in the Class A state championship in Meyers' senior year. As a senior, Meyers was named the captain of both the Omaha World-Herald All-Nebraska baseball team and the Lincoln Journal Star Super State baseball team after pitching to a 9–0 win–loss record with a 0.97 earned run average (ERA) and 80 strikeouts in 58 innings pitched while also batting .440 with six triples, 51 runs scored, and 23 runs batted in (RBIs).

Meyers attended the University of Nebraska–Lincoln as a business administration major, where he played college baseball for the Nebraska Cornhuskers as both a pitcher and an outfielder. Jake's father, Paul, also attended Nebraska and was an All-American centerfielder in 1986. Jake went 3–1 with a 2.38 ERA in 16 appearances as a pitcher in his freshman season. As a sophomore, Meyers was named third team All-Big Ten Conference after leading the team with a .326 batting average and with a 1.42 ERA. He was named first team All-Big Ten and a third team All-American by Baseball America and the NCBWA after hitting .297 with one home run, seven doubles, 16 RBIs, 52 runs scored, and 20 stolen bases while also going 8–2 on the mound with a 3.42 ERA in 84 1/3 innings pitched.

== Professional career ==
=== 2017—2020 ===
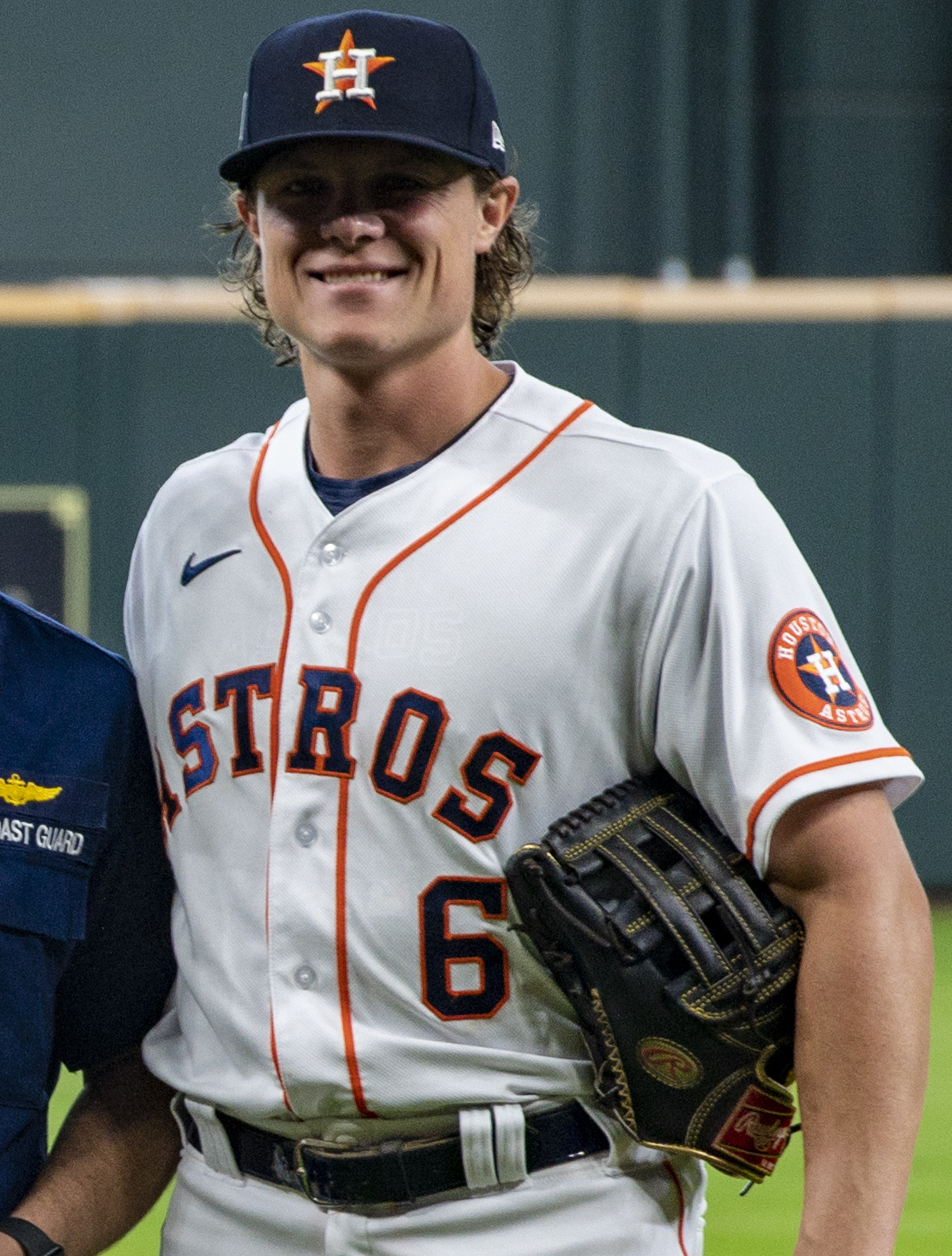
Meyers with the Houston Astros in 2022

The Houston Astros selected Meyers in the 13th round of the 2017 Major League Baseball draft. After signing with the team he was assigned to the Tri-City ValleyCats. Meyers was assigned to the Class A Quad Cities River Bandits to start the 2018 season before being promoted to the Buies Creek Astros of the Class A-Advanced Carolina League.

He returned to the Carolina League with the renamed Fayetteville Woodpeckers at the beginning of the 2019 season, where hit batted .258 with eight home runs and 41 RBIs and was named a Mid-Season All-Star before being promoted to the Double-A Corpus Christi Hooks. He was a non-roster invitee for the Astros in spring training in 2020 before it, and later the minor league season, were canceled due to the COVID-19 pandemic.

=== 2021 ===
He opened the 2021 season with the Sugar Land Skeeters. On July 31, 2021, Houston selected Meyers' contract and promoted him to the active roster. Having traded regular center fielder Myles Straw to the Cleveland Indians, the Astros gave Meyers and fellow rookie Chas McCormick the opportunity to play more. Meyers made his Major League debut on August 1 as a pinch hitter in the ninth inning of a 5–3 loss to the San Francisco Giants. Meyers hit his first career home run on August 14, against Los Angeles Angels' pitcher Jaime Barría, and hit a grand slam later in the same game as the Astros won, 8–2. On August 25, Meyers won the YouTube Game of the Week MVP for knocking in the winning run against the Kansas City Royals.

In the 2021 regular season, Meyers appeared in 49 total games and took 163 plate appearances. He batted .260/.323/.438 with six home runs and 28 RBI, 10 bases on balls (BB) and 50 strikeouts. He appeared in 39 games in center field, four in left field, and three in right field. His play was credited with +4 total Defensive Runs Saved (DRS) while he recording one outfield assist and one error. In Game 4 of the American League Division Series (ALDS) versus the Chicago White Sox, Meyers sustained an injury to his left shoulder while attempting to catch a home run ball hit by Gavin Sheets. He was unable to play in the remainder of the Astros' World Series run. On November 10, he underwent surgery to repair the torn labrum in the left shoulder, which was anticipated to delay his start to the 2022 season.

=== 2022 ===
On June 24, 2022, the club activated Meyers from the 60-day injured list. He hit a three-run home run versus Michael Lorenzen on July 1 to help spark a 5–1 win versus the Los Angeles Angels.

For the 2022 regular season, Meyers batted .227/.269/.313 in 150 at bats with one home run, 15 RBIs, and two stolen bases over 52 games with the major league club. He made 51 defensive appearances, all in center field. His eight total zone runs ranked fourth at his position in the AL.

In Game 1 of the 2022 ALDS, Meyers appeared as a pinch runner in the ninth inning and scored the lead run on a Yordan Alvarez three-run walk-off home run, for an 8–7 final over the Seattle Mariners. It was the first walk-off home run in an MLB postseason contest with the home team down to their final out in the ninth inning and trailing by more than one run.

=== 2023 ===
On May 21, 2023, Meyers reached base in a ninth consecutive plate appearance before a groundout. His running catch of an Owen Miller fly ball at the warning track in the sixth inning with a runner on at American Family Field on May 22 helped preserve a 2–1 Astros lead. The catch was recognized with the MLB Play of the Week Award on May 30. Meyers collected his first career four-hit game in the major leagues versus the Toronto Blue Jays at the Rogers Centre on June 5. On August 6, he homered twice and drove in a career-high six runs to lead Houston to a 9–7 win over New York at Yankee Stadium.

=== 2024 ===
In 2024, Meyers played in a career-high 148 games, batting .219/.286/.360, 20 doubles, 13 home runs, 61 RBI and 11 stolen bases over 513 plate appearances. He ranked third in the American League (AL) in double plays grounded into with 17. Defensively, he was fifth in the AL in total zone runs (15), and led his position in fielding percentage (.997), was second among center fielders in total zone runs, and third in games (144) and putouts (349),

=== 2025–2026 ===
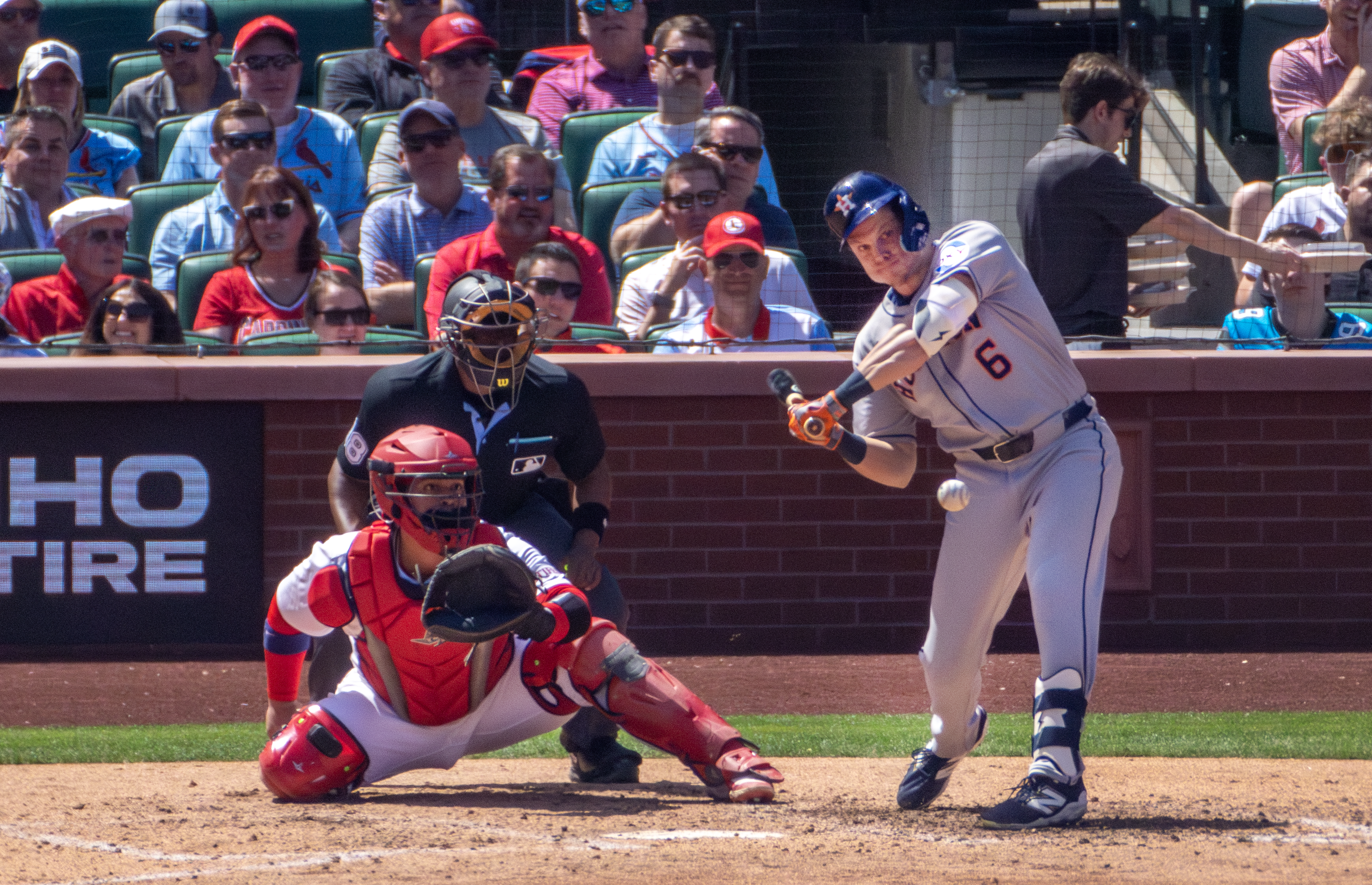
Jake Meyers in St. Louis in 2025.

On January 9, 2025, the Astros signed Meyers to a $2.3 million contract for the season, avoiding arbitration. On May 3, Meyers became the first Astro player to hit two home runs, one triple, and one double in an 8–3 victory over the Chicago White Sox. He also tied a club record with 13 total bases and career-high seven RBI.

Meyers made 57 appearances for Houston during the 2026 campaign, slashing .213/.268/.326 with three home runs and 11 RBI. On September 12, 2026, Meyers was placed on the injured list when he suffered a season–ending knee injury after fouling a ball off his kneecap. On November 2, Meyers was designated for assignment by the Astros. He elected free agency after clearing waivers the same day.

== Player profile ==
As a right-handed batter and left-handed thrower, Meyers was one of two position players with this characteristic to play in the major leagues in 2023. Teammate Chas McCormick was the other. Meyers' father, Paul, is also a former outfielder who batted right-handed and threw left-handed. (Note: A rare characteristic, from 2000 to 2022, twenty-nine different seasons with at least 100 games were logged by position players in the major leagues with this combination of batting and throwing handedness.)

== Personal life ==
Meyers married Maddie Lammel, a second-grade teacher, in December 2021. Their daughter, Ava, was born in December 2022.
