= Natsuo =

- Gender: Unisex
- Language: Japanese

Origin
- Meaning: It can have many different meanings depending on the kanji used.

Other names
- Alternative spelling: Hiragana: なつお (Katakana: ナツオ)

Natsuo is a unisex Japanese given name.

== Written forms ==
Natsuo can be written using different kanji characters and can mean: (Note: Natsu (夏) means summer.)

- 夏雄, "Summer, male".
- 夏夫, "Summer, husband".
- 夏緒, "Summer, thread".
- 夏央, "Summer, central".
- 夏生, "Summer, living".
- 奈津緒 (Note: It doesn't have a specific meaning.)
- 奈津生

The given name can also be written in hiragana or katakana.

== People with the name ==
- Natsuo Kirino (桐野 夏生; born 1951), pen name of Mariko Hashioka, Japanese novelist
- Natsuo Yamaguchi (山口 那津男; born 1952), Japanese politician

== Fictional characters ==
- Natsuo Fujii (藤井 夏生), protagonist of the manga series Domestic Girlfriend
- Natsuo Maki (真木 夏緒), a character from Love Lab
- Natsuo Sagan (目 奈津生), a character in the manga series Loveless
- Natsuo Todoroki (轟 夏雄), older brother of Shoto Todoroki from My Hero Academia

== See also ==
- Keston Wee Hing Natsuo Hiura (born 1996), American baseball player
