= Hunter Schryver =

American baseball player (born 1995)

- Pitcher
- Born: April 3, 1995 (age 30); Mechanicsburg, Pennsylvania, U.S.
- Bats: Left Throws: Left

Hunter Schryver (born April 3, 1995) is an American former professional baseball pitcher.

== Amateur career ==
Schryver attended Cumberland Valley High School in Mechanicsburg, Pennsylvania, where he earned all-state honors in baseball as a senior in 2013. He played college baseball at Villanova University. As a senior at Villanova in 2017, he started 12 games and went 4-6 with a 2.44 ERA. Following the season's end, he was selected by the Tampa Bay Rays in the seventh round of the 2017 Major League Baseball draft.

== Professional career ==
=== Tampa Bay Rays ===
Schryver signed with the Rays and made his professional debut with the Hudson Valley Renegades of the Low-A New York–Penn League, going 4-0 with a 3.12 ERA and 38 strikeouts over 34 2/3 relief innings. To begin the 2018 season, he was assigned to the Bowling Green Hot Rods of the Single-A Midwest League and was promoted to the Charlotte Stone Crabs of the High-A Florida State League during the season.

=== Chicago White Sox ===
On July 31, 2018, Schryver was traded to the Chicago White Sox in exchange for international signing pool bonus money. He was assigned to the Winston-Salem Dash of the High-A Carolina League. Over 63 2/3 innings between Bowling Green, Charlotte, and Winston-Salem, he went 1-5 with a 2.12 ERA, eighty strikeouts, and 11 saves. In 2019, he began the year with the Birmingham Barons of the Double-A Southern League before being promoted to the Charlotte Knights of the Triple-A International League. Schryver pitched to a 3-2 record and a 4.04 ERA over 62 1/3 innings pitched in relief between both teams. In February 2020, he underwent Tommy John Surgery which would have forced him to miss the 2020 minor league season had it not been cancelled due to the COVID-19 pandemic. For the 2021 season, Schryver returned to Charlotte, making forty relief appearances and compiling a 1-0 record, a 4.98 ERA, and 48 strikeouts over 43 1/3 innings. He returned to Charlotte to begin the 2022 season.

On September 12, 2022, Schryver announced his retirement from baseball. Over his minor league career, he posted a 3.55 ERA and 261 strikeouts.
