= Cory Gearrin =

American baseball player (born 1986)

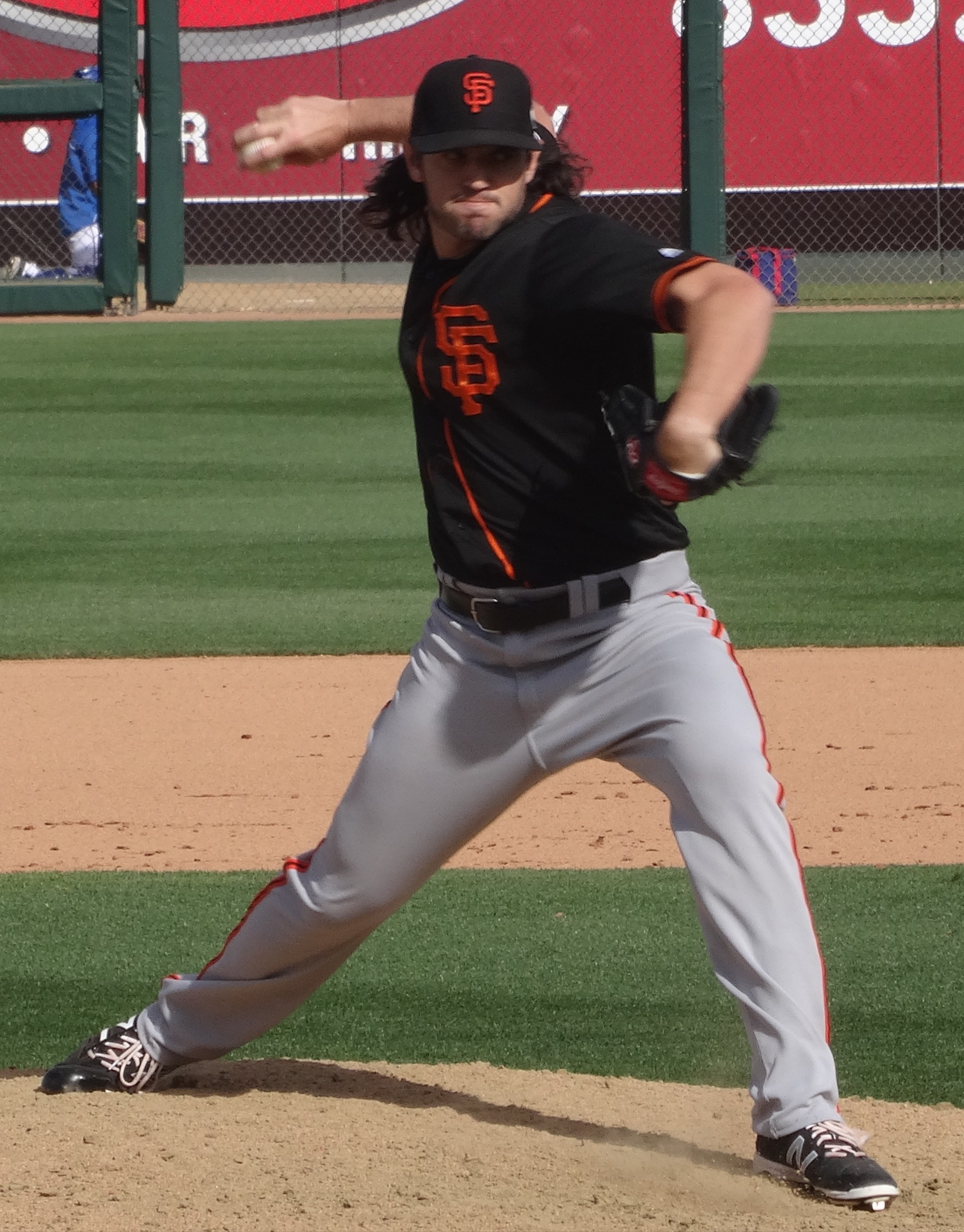
- Gearrin with the San Francisco Giants in 2016
- Pitcher
- Born: April 14, 1986 (age 40); Chattanooga, Tennessee, U.S.
- Batted: Right Threw: Right

MLB debut
- April 25, 2011, for the Atlanta Braves

Last MLB appearance
- August 9, 2020, for the Minnesota Twins

MLB statistics
- Win–loss record: 13–12
- Earned run average: 3.61
- Strikeouts: 283
- Stats at Baseball Reference

Teams
- Atlanta Braves (2011–2013); San Francisco Giants (2015–2018); Texas Rangers (2018); Oakland Athletics (2018); Seattle Mariners (2019); New York Yankees (2019); Minnesota Twins (2020)

Cory Nathanial Gearrin (born April 14, 1986) is an American former professional baseball pitcher. He played in Major League Baseball (MLB) for the Atlanta Braves, San Francisco Giants, Texas Rangers, Oakland Athletics, Seattle Mariners, New York Yankees, and Minnesota Twins.

== Early life ==
Cory Nathanial Gearrin was born on April 14, 1986, Chattanooga, Tennessee. Prior to playing professionally, he attended Rhea County High School, Young Harris College, and Mercer University. In 2006, he played collegiate summer baseball with the Cotuit Kettleers of the Cape Cod Baseball League and was named a league all-star. Gearrin was listed as a top 30 prospect in the Cape Cod League in 2006. That summer, he boasted a 1.67 ERA, striking out 41 batters in 27 innings while going 2–1 and having 8 saves. In that same summer, his pitches were clocking between 88 and 89 miles per hour. In 2007, Gearrin's junior season at Mercer, he went 4–3 with a 2.44 ERA in 26 relief appearances. He had 13 saves and 65 strikeouts in 44 innings of work, allowing only 15 hits.

== Professional career ==
=== Draft and minor leagues ===
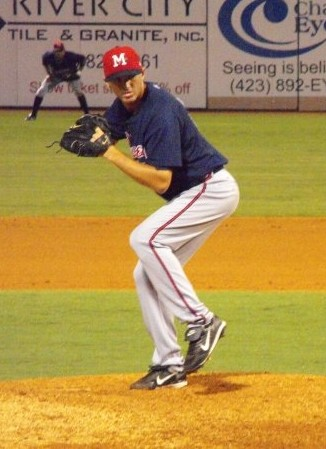
Gearrin with the Mississippi Braves in 2009

Gearrin was drafted by the Atlanta Braves in the fourth round of the 2007 amateur draft. He began his professional career in 2007, going 1–1 with a 4.44 ERA in 18 relief appearances, striking out 37 batters in 26 1/3 innings of work for the Danville Braves. The following season, he went 6–3 with a 4.11 ERA in 36 relief appearances for the Rome Braves and Myrtle Beach Pelicans, striking out 72 batters in 46 innings pitched. In 2009, Gearrin played for the Pelicans and Mississippi Braves, going a combined 1–4 with a 2.30, saving 19 games. He pitched for the Gwinnett Braves in 2010, going 3–5 with a 3.36 ERA in 52 relief appearances.

=== Atlanta Braves (2011–2013) ===
On April 22, 2011, Gearrin was called up to Atlanta's major league team from AAA Gwinnett, a move that General Manager, Frank Wren, described as a "necessity." In the bottom of the ninth of a tied game against San Diego on April 25, 2011, Gearrin made his major league debut by retiring the side in order and getting a strikeout. Returning to the mound for the bottom of the tenth, Gearrin again retired the Padres in order while registering another strikeout. On May 1, 2011, Gearrin recorded his first blown save after giving up the tying run in the 7th inning to the St. Louis Cardinals, a game the Braves later came back to win. While he was with Atlanta in 2011, he had a 1–1 record with an ERA of 7.85 in 18 games with zero saves in 18.1 innings of work, while giving up 17 hits, 16 earned runs and no home runs.

After being recalled to the Braves from Gwinnett once again on April 24, 2012, when Jair Jurrjens was sent down, Gearrin was sent back down 5 days later when Tim Hudson was activated from the DL having not appeared with the Braves.

During the 2013 season, Gearrin became a key part of the Braves bullpen due to many injuries to regular relief pitchers. Despite a good start to the season (a 1.46 ERA in April and a 2.13 ERA in May), Gearrin's ERA increased significantly in June (10.80 in six appearances). After allowing two earned runs during a relief appearance on July 3, Gearrin was optioned to Gwinnett for the first time in 2013 on July 5. In 2014, Gearrin attended spring training with the Braves. He was likely to earn one of the open roster spots in the bullpen, but he left his last outing with discomfort in his right elbow. It was later revealed that Gearrin would need Tommy John surgery and miss the season. He was released by the Braves on November 10.

=== San Francisco Giants (2015–2018) ===
On November 24, 2014, Gearrin signed a minor league contract with the San Francisco Giants. He was called up to the Giants on September 8, 2015, and he appeared in seven games, pitching 3 2/3 innings. In 2016, Gearrin was named to the Giants' Opening Day roster. In 56 games, he was 3–2 with a 4.28 ERA in 48 1/3 innings. He also had 3 saves.

Gearrin and the Giants avoided salary arbitration on December 3, by agreeing to a one-year, $1.05 million contract for the 2017 season. He was the only MLB pitcher to give up two bases-loaded triples in 2017. He enjoyed the best season of his career in 2017, posting an ERA of 1.99 in 68 games. In 2018, he was 1–1 in 30 innings for the Giants.

=== Texas Rangers (2018) ===
On July 8, 2018, the Giants traded Gearrin to the Texas Rangers along with Austin Jackson and minor league pitcher Jason Bahr in exchange for a player to be named later or cash considerations.

=== Oakland Athletics (2018) ===
On August 31, 2018, Gearrin was traded to the Oakland Athletics in exchange for minor league pitchers Abdiel Mendoza and Teodoro Ortega. Gearrin pitched in 6 games in September. He was non-tendered and became a free agent on November 30.

=== Seattle Mariners (2019) ===
On January 10, 2019, Gearrin signed a one-year contract with the Seattle Mariners.

=== New York Yankees (2019) ===
On August 23, 2019, Gearrin was claimed off waivers by the New York Yankees. He became a free agent after the season.

=== Minnesota Twins (2020) ===
On February 17, 2020, Gearrin signed a minor league deal with the Minnesota Twins that included an invite to spring training. On August 9, the Twins selected Gearrin to the active roster. He was designated for assignment on August 13. He cleared waivers and was sent outright to the Twins extended training facility three days later. Gearrin elected free agency on October 14.

Over the course of his major league career, he pitched 302 innings with a 3.64 earned run average, a 1.31 WHIP, 3.84 base on balls per nine innings, and 8.40 strikeouts per nine innings.

== Personal life ==
Gearrin and his wife married on May 18, 2017, an off-day for the Giants.

Gearrin grew up an Atlanta Braves fan.
