= Austin Jackson (baseball) =

American baseball player (born 1987)

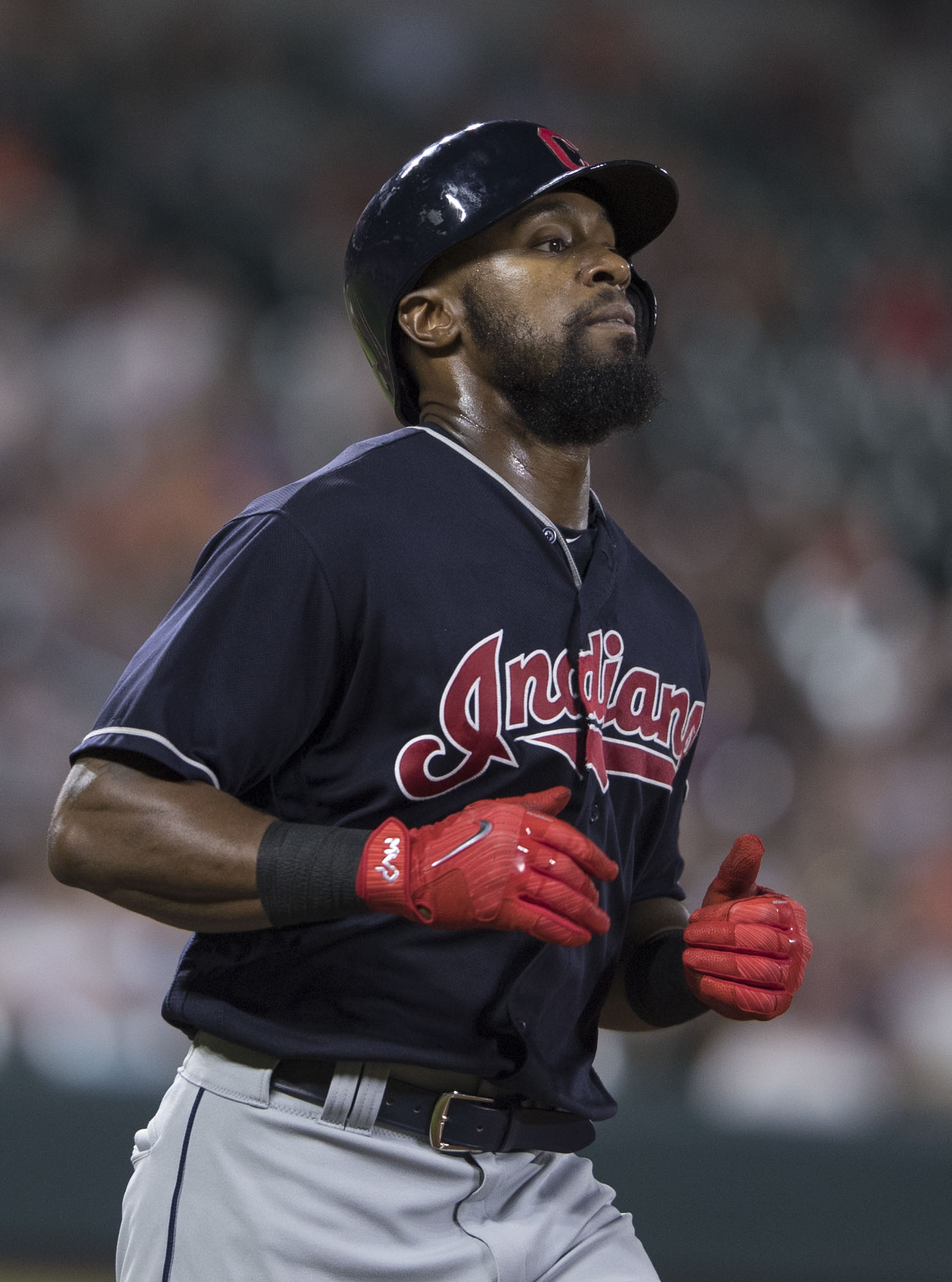
- Jackson with the Cleveland Indians in 2017
- Center fielder
- Born: February 1, 1987 (age 39); Denton, Texas, U.S.
- Batted: Right Threw: Right

MLB debut
- April 5, 2010, for the Detroit Tigers

Last MLB appearance
- September 30, 2018, for the New York Mets

MLB statistics
- Batting average: .273
- Home runs: 65
- Runs batted in: 381
- Stats at Baseball Reference

Teams
- Detroit Tigers (2010–2014); Seattle Mariners (2014–2015); Chicago Cubs (2015); Chicago White Sox (2016); Cleveland Indians (2017); San Francisco Giants (2018); New York Mets (2018)

Austin Jarriel Jackson (born February 1, 1987) is an American former professional baseball center fielder. He played in Major League Baseball (MLB) for the Detroit Tigers, Seattle Mariners, Chicago Cubs, Chicago White Sox, Cleveland Indians, San Francisco Giants, and New York Mets. Prior to playing professionally, he attended Billy Ryan High School.

The New York Yankees selected Jackson in the 2005 MLB draft and traded him to the Tigers at the end of the 2009 season, where he made his MLB debut in 2010. The next two seasons, he made the postseason on both occasions with the Tigers. During those seasons, he led the American League in hitting triples. He won the Fielding Bible Award for center field in 2011. Detroit traded him to Seattle in 2014, and the Mariners traded him to the Cubs in 2015. He then signed several free agent contracts, ending his MLB career in 2018.

== Early years ==
In 1999, Baseball America named Jackson the best 12-year-old baseball player in the nation and the best 15-year-old baseball player three years later.

Jackson attended Billy Ryan High School in Denton, Texas.

In basketball, he was listed as the #10-ranked high school point guard in the country by Athlon Sports after he averaged 22.5 points, five rebounds and three assists per game his junior year in high school. In baseball, he hit .423 with five homers and 34 RBI for his class AAAA Texas State runner-up baseball team and was rated the No. 14 draft prospect among high school players in the nation by Baseball America.

== Professional career ==
=== New York Yankees ===
Though Jackson committed to play both baseball and basketball for Georgia Tech, the New York Yankees drafted him in the eighth round (259th overall) in the 2005 Major League Baseball draft. To convince him to sign instead of attending Georgia Tech, the Yankees offered Jackson $800,000, a record signing bonus for an eighth round pick.

From 2005 to 2009 Jackson rose up the Yankees organization and after a slow start, he became a top prospect for the Yankees. In 2009, he was the Yankees top prospect according to Baseball America. After the season, Jackson was added to the 40-man roster to protect him from the Rule 5 draft.

=== Detroit Tigers ===
On December 9, 2009, Jackson was traded to the Detroit Tigers as part of a three-team trade that brought Curtis Granderson to the Yankees and Max Scherzer to the Tigers. Jackson entered the 2010 season as the Tigers third-best prospect, according to Baseball America.

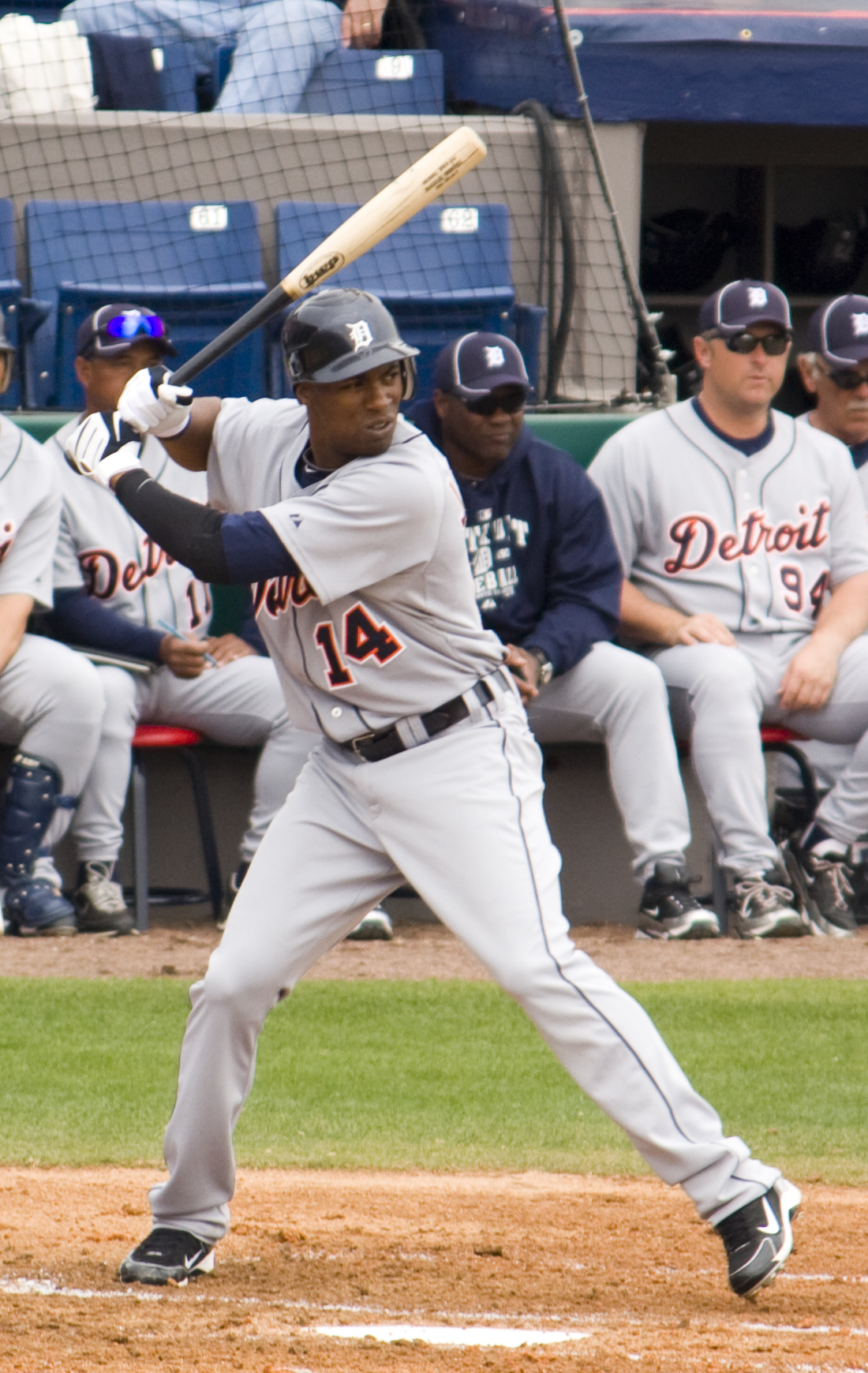
Jackson batting for the Detroit Tigers in 2010 spring training

Jackson made his major league debut on April 5, 2010, against the Kansas City Royals, going one for five. He hit his first major league home run on April 25 off of Colby Lewis of the Texas Rangers. Through the first month of the season Jackson led the majors with 36 hits and was named the American League (AL) Rookie of the Month. On June 2, against the Cleveland Indians, Jackson made a difficult over-the-shoulder running catch in the ninth inning of Armando Galarraga's near-perfect game. The perfect game eventually ended with two outs in the ninth after an incorrect call by umpire Jim Joyce. Jackson was named an outfielder on Baseball America's All-Rookie Team and the Topps All-Star Rookie Team. He finished second in American League Rookie of the Year voting, behind Rangers closer Neftalí Feliz. Jackson finished his rookie season by playing 151 games with a .293 batting average, 10 triples, 4 home runs, 41 RBI, and an AL-leading 170 strikeouts.

Jackson was named the AL Player of the Week for the week of August 29–September 4, 2011. He had a .529 batting average during the week with three doubles, three triples, two home runs, five RBI, and 13 runs scored. The Tigers went 5–2 that week to increase their lead in the AL Central division. He won a Fielding Bible Award in 2011 as the best fielding center fielder in MLB. Jackson played 153 games, batting .249 with 10 home runs, 45 RBI, an AL-leading 11 triples, and 181 strikeouts. In Game 6 of the AL Championship Series, Jackson hit his first career postseason home run. The Tigers would however lose the game and the series to Texas.

On April 5, 2012, Jackson was the leadoff hitter and played center field on Opening Day for the Tigers, where he went 3-for-5 with an RBI and a run. Jackson hit a walk-off, bases-loaded single down the third base line to give the Tigers the win over the Red Sox, 3–2. Jackson played 137 games in 2012, batting .300 with 16 home runs, 66 RBI, and an AL-leading 10 triples. Jackson went to the postseason with the Tigers for a second straight season, and he hit a home run in the series-clinching Game 4 against the New York Yankees in the ALCS. But the Tigers eventually got swept in 4 games by the San Francisco Giants in the World Series.

Injuries limited Jackson to 129 games in 2013. Serving as the Tigers leadoff hitter again, he batted .272 with 12 home runs, 49 RBIs, and a then-career-low 8 stolen bases. On January 17, 2014, Jackson and the Tigers avoided arbitration by agreeing to a one-year, $6 million contract.

=== Seattle Mariners ===
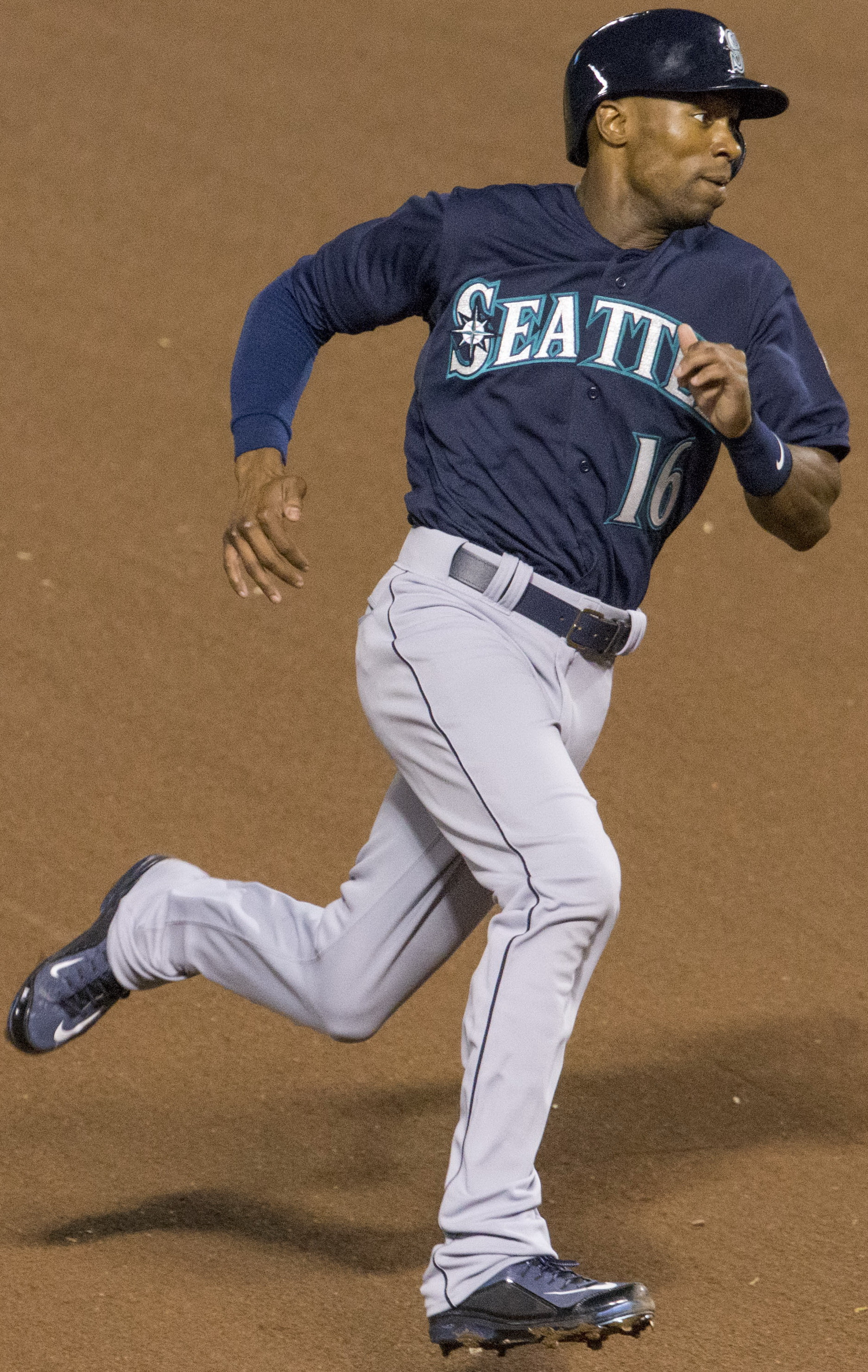
Jackson with the Seattle Mariners in 2014

On July 31, 2014, the Tigers traded Jackson to the Seattle Mariners in a three-team deal that sent Drew Smyly, Nick Franklin and Willy Adames to the Tampa Bay Rays, and David Price to Detroit. Jackson batted .229 in 54 games with Seattle to finish the 2014 season.

On May 3, 2015, Jackson sprained his ankle in a game against the Houston Astros and was placed on the 15-day disabled list the following day, missing three weeks.

=== Chicago Cubs ===
On August 31, 2015, the Mariners traded Jackson to the Chicago Cubs for a player to be named later and an international signing bonus slot.

Jackson ended the 2015 season having played 136 games, stealing 17 bases with a .696 OPS with the Mariners and Cubs.

=== Chicago White Sox ===
On March 6, 2016, Jackson signed a one-year, $5 million deal with the Chicago White Sox. On August 25, White Sox general manager Rick Hahn told the media that Jackson would miss the rest of the season after he had been out since June 10. He had surgery to repair a medial meniscus tear in his left knee. Over 54 games, he tallied a .254 batting average, 18 RBI, 12 doubles, and 24 runs scored.

=== Cleveland Indians ===
Jackson signed a minor league contract with the Cleveland Indians on January 25, 2017. The Indians purchased Jackson's contract on March 27. On August 1, he robbed Hanley Ramirez of a home run by making a spectacular catch over the right center field wall. He traveled approximately 97 feet and flipped over the wall into the Red Sox bullpen. Jackson's catch was later named the best defensive play of the year by the This Year in Baseball Awards.

=== San Francisco Giants ===
On January 22, 2018, Jackson signed a two-year deal with the San Francisco Giants worth $6 million.

=== Texas Rangers ===
On July 8, 2018, Jackson was traded to the Texas Rangers along with pitcher Cory Gearrin and minor league pitcher Jason Bahr, in exchange for a player to be named later or cash considerations. Three days later, he was designated for assignment by the Rangers. The Rangers released Jackson on July 14.

=== New York Mets ===
On July 27, 2018, Jackson signed a major league contract with the New York Mets. On September 29, he hit a walk-off double in the 13th inning on David Wright's final career game, giving the Mets a 1–0 victory. Jackson became a free agent after the season.

== Post-playing career ==
In April 2020, Jackson expressed interest in returning to MLB.

In July 2021, Jackson announced the three-game series between two of his former teams, the Tigers and Rangers, alongside Dan Dickerson on the Detroit Tigers Radio Network.

| Preceded by Adrián González | MLB Player of the Week Award (American League); August 29 – September 4, 2011 | Succeeded by C. J. Wilson |
