= Francisco Morales (baseball) =

Venezuelan baseball pitcher (born 1999)

Free agent
- Pitcher
- Born: October 27, 1999 (age 26); San Juan de los Morros, Venezuela
- Bats: Right Throws: Right

MLB debut
- May 9, 2022, for the Philadelphia Phillies

MLB statistics (through 2022 season)
- Win–loss record: 0–0
- Earned run average: 7.20
- Strikeouts: 3
- Stats at Baseball Reference

Teams
- Philadelphia Phillies (2022)

Francisco Javier Morales (born October 27, 1999) is a Venezuelan professional baseball pitcher who is a free agent. He has previously played in Major League Baseball (MLB) for the Philadelphia Phillies.

== Career ==
=== Philadelphia Phillies ===
Morales signed with the Philadelphia Phillies organization as an international free agent on July 2, 2016. He made his professional debut with the GCL Phillies, posting a 3–2 record and 3.05 ERA in 10 appearances. The next year, Morales played for the Low-A Williamsport Crosscutters, logging a 4–5 record and 5.27 ERA with 68 strikeouts in 56.1 innings of work. In 2019 he played for the Single-A Lakewood BlueClaws, pitching to a 1–8 record and 3.82 ERA with 129 strikeouts in 96.2 innings pitched. Morales did not play in a game in 2020 due to the cancellation of the minor league season because of the COVID-19 pandemic. The Phillies added him to their 40-man roster after the 2020 season. He was assigned to the Double-A Reading Fightin Phils to begin the 2021 season. On July 3, he pitched a combined no-hitter against the Erie SeaWolves along with Kyle Dohy, Zach Warren, and Brian Marconi.

On May 9, 2022, Morales was promoted to the major leagues for the first time when Zach Eflin was placed on the COVID-19 injured list. Morales made his MLB debut the same day, pitching two scoreless innings against the Seattle Mariners.

On January 4, 2023, Morales was designated for assignment by the Phillies after the signing of Craig Kimbrel was made official. On January 11, he was assigned outright to the Triple-A Lehigh Valley IronPigs. In 22 games for Lehigh Valley, he registered a 6.75 ERA with 36 strikeouts and 2 saves in 25 1/3 innings pitched. Morales was released by the Phillies organization on July 22.

=== Arizona Diamondbacks ===
On November 19, 2023, Morales signed a minor league contract with the Arizona Diamondbacks. He spent 2024 with the rookie–level Arizona Complex League Diamondbacks, Double–A Amarillo Sod Poodles, and Triple–A Reno Aces. In 27 games split between the three affiliates, Morales struggled to a 2–5 record and 9.20 ERA with 45 strikeouts across 30 1/3 innings pitched. He was released by the Diamondbacks organization on August 20, 2024.

=== Acereros de Monclova ===
On February 14, 2025, Morales signed with the Acereros de Monclova of the Mexican League. He appeared in 36 relief appearances recording a 2-0 record and 5.08 ERA with 34 strikeouts in 33.2 innings. He became a free agent following the season.

=== Delfines de La Guaira ===
On April 16, 2026, Morales signed with the Delfines de La Guaira of the Venezuelan Major League.
