= Kyle Dohy =

American baseball player (born 1996)

- Pitcher
- Born: September 17, 1996 (age 30); Arcadia, California
- Batted: Left Threw: Left

MLB debut
- October 2, 2021, for the Philadelphia Phillies

Last MLB appearance
- October 2, 2021, for the Philadelphia Phillies

MLB statistics
- Win–loss record: 0-0
- Earned run average: 0.00
- Strikeouts: 1
- Stats at Baseball Reference

Teams
- Philadelphia Phillies (2021)

Kyle Kent Dohy (born September 17, 1996) is an American former professional baseball pitcher. He played in one game in Major League Baseball (MLB) for the Philadelphia Phillies during the 2021 season.

== Amateur career ==
Dohy attended Charter Oak High School in Covina, California and graduated in 2014. After graduating, he enrolled at California State University, Northridge, where he played college baseball. However, as a freshman in 2015, he appeared in only four games, and he transferred to Citrus College after the season. In 2016, as a sophomore at Citrus, he started five games, going 1–2 with a 3.98 ERA and striking out 32 in 20 1/3 innings. Following the season, he transferred to California State Polytechnic University, Pomona. In 79 2/3 innings, he went 6–3 with a 5.99 ERA, striking out 89 (third in the California Collegiate Athletic Association) while walking sixty (leading the Association) with 17 wild pitches (second). After the season, he was selected by the Philadelphia Phillies in the 16th round of the 2017 Major League Baseball draft.

== Professional career ==
Dohy signed with the Phillies and made his professional debut with the Williamsport Crosscutters, going 2–1 with a 3.60 ERA, 22 strikeouts, and twenty walks over twenty innings. In 2018, he began the year with the Lakewood BlueClaws, with whom he was named a South Atlantic League All-Star, and was promoted to the Clearwater Threshers and Reading Fightin Phils during the season. In 67 1/3 relief innings pitched between the three clubs, Dohy went 7–9 with a 2.54 ERA, 42 walks, and 111 strikeouts. Dohy returned to Reading to begin the 2019 season before being promoted to the Lehigh Valley IronPigs in April, with whom he finished the season. Over 47 relief appearances between the two clubs, Dohy pitched to a 7–5 record with a 5.32 ERA, striking out 105 and walking 59 over 67 2/3 innings. His 17 wild pitches while with Lehigh Valley tied for the International League lead, and he had the worst walks/9 innings ratio at 8.6, but also had the third-best strikeouts/9 innings ratio at 13.2.

The Phillies added Dohy to their 40-man roster after the 2020 season. He did not play a minor league game in 2020 due to the cancellation of the minor league season caused by the COVID-19 pandemic. On April 1, 2021, Dohy was designated for assignment by the Phillies and outrighted off the roster. To begin the 2021 season, he was assigned to Lehigh Valley, but was demoted to Reading after compiling a 10.38 ERA over 4 1/3 innings. On July 3, he pitched a combined no-hitter against the Erie SeaWolves along with Francisco Morales, Zach Warren, and Brian Marconi. He was promoted back to Lehigh Valley in September. Over 42 2/3 innings pitched between Reading and Lehigh Valley, Dohy went 4–0 with a 2.95 ERA, 65 strikeouts, and 28 walks.

On September 25, 2021, the Phillies selected Dohy's contract and promoted him to the major leagues. He made his MLB debut on October 2 versus the Miami Marlins at LoanDepot Park, throwing one scoreless inning of relief in which he gave up one hit and one walk while also striking out one batter.

On November 30, Dohy was non-tendered by the Phillies, making him a free agent. However, Dohy re-signed with the Phillies on a minor league contract the same day. On June 22, 2022, the Phillies released Dohy.
