= Sam Carlson =

American baseball player (born 1998)

Free agent
- Pitcher
- Born: December 3, 1998 (age 27); Savage, Minnesota, U.S.
- Bats: Right Throws: Right
- Stats at Baseball Reference

Samuel Carlson (born December 3, 1998) is an American professional baseball pitcher who is a free agent.

== Career ==
=== Seattle Mariners ===
Carlson attended Burnsville High School in Burnsville, Minnesota. During his senior year, Carlson had a jump in velocity, going from the 88–92 miles per hour range to 93–97. He posted a 0.93 ERA (9th in state and 2nd on Burnsville) and 53 strikeouts (28th in state) over 34 innings, and was named Minnesota Mr. Baseball. He committed to play college baseball for the Florida Gators. Carlson was selected in the second round, with the 55th overall selection, of the 2017 Major League Baseball draft by the Seattle Mariners. He signed with the Mariners for $2 million. He made his professional debut with the Arizona League Mariners, pitching only three innings before being shut down due to minor elbow discomfort.

Heading into the 2018 season, Carlson was named Seattle's third ranked prospect and the top pitching prospect in the organization, but had elbow discomfort return during the Mariners mini-camp in February and was shut down again. He was given a Platelet-rich plasma injection and eventually started rehabbing, but a setback in his rehab forced him to undergo Tommy John surgery on July 2, causing him to miss the rest of 2018 and all of the 2019 season. Carlson returned healthy in 2020, but did not play a game after the minor league season was cancelled due to the COVID-19 pandemic. For the 2021 season, he was assigned to the Single-A Modesto Nuts, starting 19 games with a 6–4 record, 4.77 ERA, and 112 strikeouts in 100 innings.

In 2022, Carlson made 16 appearances (11 starts) for Modesto, recording a 4.61 ERA with 60 strikeouts across 56 2/3 innings of work. He spent 2023 with the High-A Everett AquaSox, pitching in 39 games and logging a 5.25 ERA with 61 strikeouts and six saves. As a six-year minor league veteran, Carlson elected free agency on November 6.

=== Milwaukee Brewers ===
On November 30, 2023, Carlson signed a minor league contract with the Milwaukee Brewers. He pitched 44 games in relief for the Double-A Biloxi Shuckers in 2024, going 4–2 with a 4.25 ERA and 51 strikeouts in 48 2/3 innings. Carlson elected free agency following the season on November 4, 2024.

=== Los Angeles Dodgers ===
On December 13, 2024, Carlson signed a minor league contract with the Los Angeles Dodgers. He pitched in 45 games for the Triple-A Oklahoma City Comets, posting a 4–2 record and 4.22 ERA with 78 strikeouts. Carlson elected free agency following the season on November 6, 2025.

=== Houston Astros ===
On December 27, 2025, Carlson signed a minor league contract with the Houston Astros. He made 31 appearances for the Triple–A Sugar Land Space Cowboys, compiling a 4–1 record and 3.47 ERA with 43 strikeouts across 36 1/3 innings of relief. Carlson was released by the Astros organization on August 4, 2026.

=== Philadelphia Phillies ===
On September 1, 2026, Carlson signed a minor league contract with the Philadelphia Phillies. In 5 games with Double-A Reading he threw 5.1 innings going 2-0 with a 8.44 ERA and 9 strikeouts. He elected free agency on November 2.
