= Matt Tabor =

American baseball player (born 1998)

- Pitcher
- Born: July 14, 1998 (age 27); Westford, Massachusetts, U.S.
- Bats: Right Throws: Right

Matt Tabor (born July 14, 1998) is an American former professional baseball pitcher.

== Amateur career ==
Tabor attended Milton Academy in Milton, Massachusetts. As a junior in 2016, he had a 1.07 ERA. In 2017, his senior year, he struck out 75 batters over 42 innings and compiled a 0.67 ERA. Following the season, he was selected by the Arizona Diamondbacks in the third round of the 2017 Major League Baseball draft. He signed with Arizona for $1 million, forgoing his college commitment to play college baseball at Elon University.

== Professional career ==
=== Arizona Diamondbacks ===
After signing, Tabor made his professional debut with the Arizona League Diamondbacks, pitching 4 2/3 innings. In 2018, he pitched for the Hillsboro Hops of the Low–A Northwest League, going 2–1 with a 3.26 ERA over 14 starts. Following the season's end, he was named a Northwest League All-Star. Tabor spent the 2019 season with the Kane County Cougars of the Single–A Midwest League in which he went 5–4 with a 2.93 ERA over 21 starts, striking out 101 batters over 95 1/3 innings. Tabor did not play in a game in 2020 due to the cancellation of the minor league season because of the COVID-19 pandemic.

To begin the 2021 season, Tabor returned to Hillsboro, now members of the High-A West. In late May, after pitching to a 2–2 record with a 3.00 ERA over 24 innings, he was promoted to the Amarillo Sod Poodles of the Double-A Central. On July 11, he threw the first no-hitter in Sod Poodles history, striking out three and walking two in a seven inning game as Amarillo defeated the San Antonio Missions by a score of 6–1. After ten starts in which he compiled a 3–5 record with a 3.88 ERA and 47 strikeouts over 51 innings with Amarillo, he was promoted to the Reno Aces of the Triple-A West in late July. Over eight starts with Reno, Tabor went 1–4 with an 11.13 ERA over 32 1/3 innings. He returned to Amarillo to begin the 2022 season, but pitched in only one game before a thoracic outlet/posterior circumflex humeral artery aneurysm injury forced him to miss the remainder of the season.

During spring training in 2023, he felt tug in his elbow that resulted in requiring Tommy John surgery, ending his season before it began. On April 10, 2023, Tabor was released by the Diamondbacks organization with a medical settlement.

=== Seattle Mariners ===
On April 1, 2024, Tabor signed a minor league contract with the Seattle Mariners. He made 12 appearances split between the rookie–level Arizona Complex League Mariners, High–A Everett AquaSox, and Triple–A Tacoma Rainiers, accumulating a 3.68 ERA with 15 strikeouts across 14 2/3 innings pitched. Tabor was released by the Mariners organization as his symptoms of Thoracic Outlet Syndrome were coming back on July 20.
