= Ryan Amoroso =

American basketball player

Ryan Anthony Amoroso
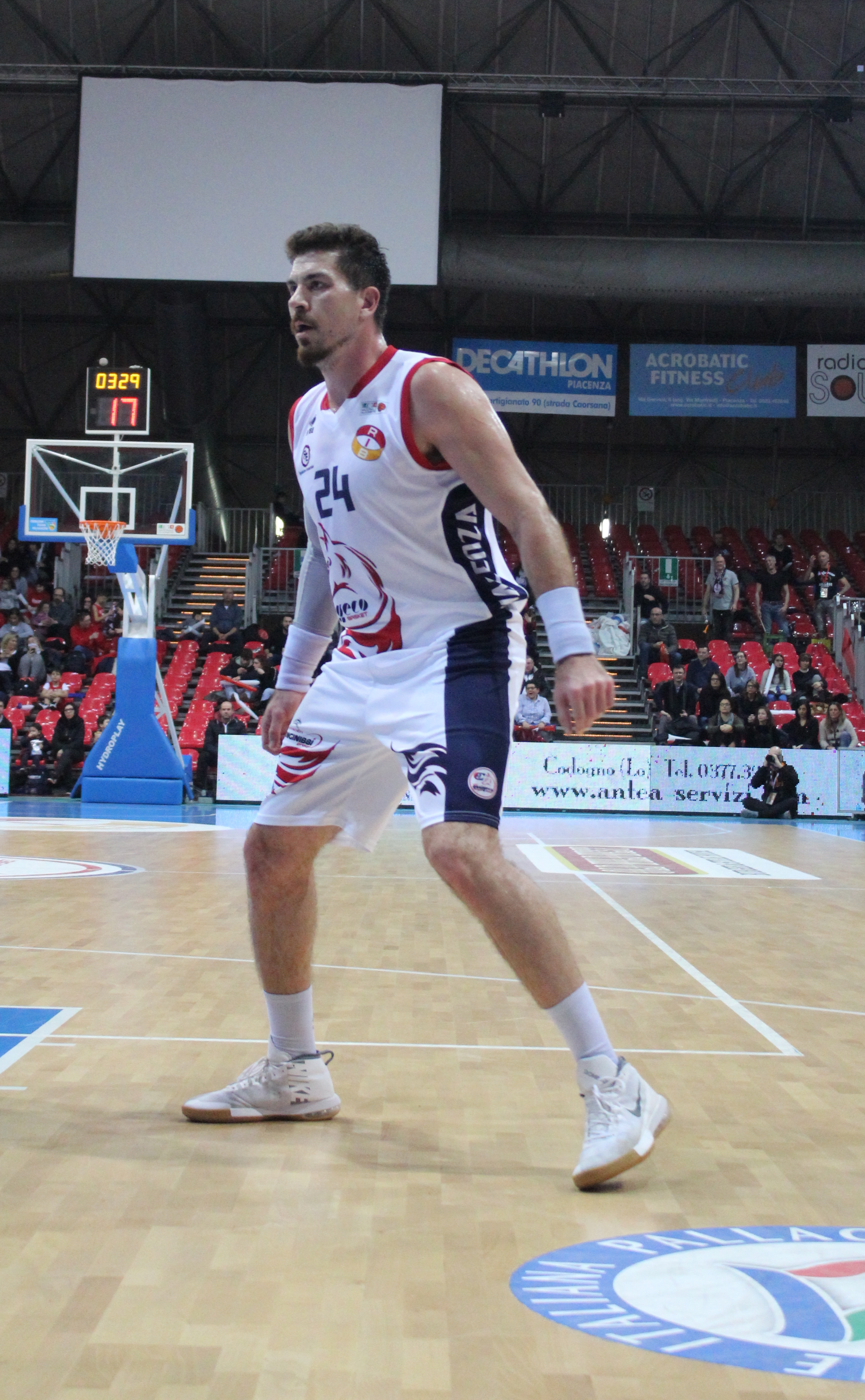
- Amoroso in action with the U.C.C. Piacenza

Personal information
- Born: July 12, 1985 (age 40) Minneapolis, Minnesota, U.S.
- Listed height: 6 ft 8 in (2.03 m)
- Listed weight: 255 lb (116 kg)

Career information
- High school: Burnsville Senior
- College: Marquette (2004–2006); San Diego State (2006–2009)
- Playing career: 2009–present
- Position: Power forward

Career history
- 2009–2010: Andrea Costa Imola
- 2010–2011: Snæfell
- 2011–2012: Morpho Basket Piacena
- 2013: Snæfell
- 2013–2014: Nord Barese
- 2014–2015: Pallacanestro Mantovana
- 2015–2016: Ferro Carril Oeste
- 2016–2017: Pallacanestro 2.015 Forli
- 2017–2018: Comunicaciones Mercedes

Career highlights
- Icelandic Super Cup (2010); Icelandic Company Cup (2010); Icelandic All-star game (2011)

Ryan Anthony Amoroso (born July 12, 1985) is an American basketball player who last played for Comunicaciones Mercedes in the Argentinian Torneo Nacional de Ascenso. He was the starting power forward for the Aztecs of San Diego State University.

== High school career ==
Born in Minneapolis, Minnesota, Ryan Amoroso attended Burnsville Senior High School in Burnsville, Minnesota. As a senior, Amoroso averaged 24.1 points and 12 rebounds per game, leading the team to the Minnesota State Championship game before losing to Chaska Senior High School and an overall record of 29–5. Amoroso led the Lake Conference in scoring and rebounding his senior and junior seasons also setting school records in career points and rebounds. Additionally, Amoroso was an all-conference and all-state selection both his junior and senior years.
After completing his high school career, Amoroso signed a National Letter of Intent with Marquette University.

== Collegiate career ==
Amoroso began his career at Marquette University where he played in all 31 games for the Golden Eagles during his freshman year, who finished with a 19–12 record and a berth in the NIT during the 2004–2005 season. He averaged 6.0 points and 3.6 rebounds per game in just 15.2 minutes per game. Amoroso made three starts during the year and saw his numbers increase as the season progressed. He managed to put up 18 points and 8 rebounds against Tulane University on January 8, 2005, while just playing 14 minutes, and became the first Golden Eagle freshman to record a double-double since 2001 by scoring 16 points and grabbing 12 rebounds against the University of Memphis. Amoroso left Marquette in 2006 and transferred to San Diego State University, where he sat out the 2006–2007 season due to NCAA transfer rules.

== Professional career ==
Amoroso signed with Andrea Costa Agnet Imola Basket in Imola, Italy for the 2009–2010 season.

During the 2010–2011 season he played for Snæfell in the Icelandic Úrvalsdeild and averaged 18.8 points and 9.6 rebounds. He helped the club win both the Supercup and the Company cup. He was selected to the seasons All-star game where he scored 14 points. During Snæfell's playoffs series against Stjarnan, Amoroso was caught in a controversy when he refused to shake the hand of Teitur Örlygsson, the head coach of Stjarnan, after the first game of the series, resulting a shouting match between the two. After the second game, he again refused to shake the hand of most of the members of Stjarnan, again resulting in a confrontation.

He returned to Snæfell in January 2013. In 15 games, he averaged 20.7 points and 14.5 rebounds.

Amoroso signed with Comunicaciones Mercedes of the Argentinian Torneo Nacional de Ascenso in August 2017.
