= Dylan File =

American baseball player (born 1996)

Texas Rangers
- Pitcher
- Born: June 4, 1996 (age 30); Lake Havasu City, Arizona, U.S.
- Bats: Right Throws: Right

KBO debut
- May 4, 2023, for the Doosan Bears

KBO statistics (through 2023 season)
- Win–loss record: 0–1
- Earned run average: 8.00
- Strikeouts: 2

Teams
- Doosan Bears (2023)

Dylan File (born June 4, 1996) is an American professional baseball pitcher in the Texas Rangers organization. He has previously played in the KBO League for the Doosan Bears.

== Amateur career ==
File attended Desert Hills High School in St. George, Utah, where he played baseball. In 2014, his senior year, he went 7–2 with a 0.63 ERA along with batting .400. Unselected in the 2015 Major League Baseball draft, he enrolled at Dixie State University where he played college baseball.

In 2015, File's freshman season at Dixie State, he appeared in 12 games (ten starts) in which he went 6–1 with a 2.63 ERA, striking out 44 over 61 2/3 innings. He was named the Pacific West Conference Freshman of the Year. As a sophomore in 2016, he started 14 games, going 6–1 with a 2.99 ERA. That summer, he played in the Northwoods League with the Wisconsin Rapids Rafters. In 2017, his junior year, File went 8–2 with a 3.58 ERA over 15 games (14 starts), striking out 75 over 93 innings, earning Pacific West Co-Pitcher of the Year.

== Professional career ==
=== Milwaukee Brewers ===
The Milwaukee Brewers selected File in the 21st round of the 2017 Major League Baseball draft.

File signed with Milwaukee and made his professional debut with the Helena Brewers. Over 12 games (seven starts), he went 1–2 with a 4.02 ERA. In 2018, he spent the season with the Wisconsin Timber Rattlers, with whom he was named a Midwest League All-Star, and compiled an 8–10 record with a 3.96 ERA, striking out 114 over 136 1/3 innings and 25 starts. In 2019, he began the year with the Carolina Mudcats (earning Carolina League All-Star honors) before being promoted to the Biloxi Shuckers in June, with whom he finished the year. Over 26 starts between both teams, File pitched to a 15–6 record with a 3.24 ERA, collecting 136 strikeouts over 147 innings.

File did not play a minor league game in 2020 due to the cancellation of the minor league season caused by the COVID-19 pandemic. The Brewers added him to their 40-man roster after the season. In February 2021, File underwent surgery to repair a stress fracture in his right elbow, forcing him to miss the beginning of the 2021 season. He was placed on the 60-day injured list on May 2. He was activated in early July and was assigned to the Nashville Sounds of the Triple-A East. Over 13 starts, File went 2–5 with a 5.36 ERA and 45 strikeouts over 50 1/3 innings. He was assigned back to Nashville to begin the 2022 season. He was outrighted off the 40-man roster on May 23, 2022. File was released after the season on November 15.

=== Doosan Bears ===
On November 16, 2022, File signed a contract with the Doosan Bears of the KBO League. In late February 2023, File took a comebacker to the head during a live batting practice session in Australia and missed the beginning of the season. On May 4, File made his KBO debut, allowing five runs and five hits against the Hanwha Eagles. His second and final start with the Bears saw him give up four runs (three earned) and five hits in five innings pitched against the Lotte Giants. He later experienced elbow problems and was released by the Bears on June 8.

=== Arizona Diamondbacks ===
On January 20, 2024, File signed a minor league contract with the Arizona Diamondbacks. In 21 games (20 starts) split between the Double-A Amarillo Sod Poodles and Triple-A Reno Aces, he accumulated a 5-10 record and 5.27 ERA with 74 strikeouts across 107 2/3 innings pitched. File elected free agency following the season on November 4.

=== Seattle Mariners ===
On January 2, 2025, File signed a minor league contract with the Seattle Mariners. He made 28 appearances (24 starts) split between the Double-A Arkansas Travelers and Triple-A Tacoma Rainiers, posting a combined 8-4 record and 4.70 ERA with 100 strikeouts across 130 1/3 innings pitched. File elected free agency following the season on November 6.

=== Detroit Tigers ===
On December 19, 2025, File signed a minor league contract with the Detroit Tigers. He was assigned to the Triple-A Toledo Mud Hens for the 2026 season and appeared in 28 games (27 starts) in which he had a 7-11 record, a 5.28 ERA, and 102 strikeouts across 131 1/3 innings pitched. He elected free agency on November 2.

=== Texas Rangers ===
On November 18, 2026, File signed a minor league contract with the Texas Rangers.
