= Jason Bahr =

American baseball player (born 1995)

- Pitcher
- Born: February 15, 1995 (age 30); Orlando, Florida, U.S.
- Bats: Right Throws: Right

Jason Thomas Bahr (born February 15, 1995) is an American former professional baseball pitcher.

== Career ==
Bahr attended Lake Mary High School in Lake Mary, Florida. He enrolled at the University of Central Florida (UCF) and made the UCF Knights baseball team as a walk on. He was cut from the team by coach Terry Rooney after the 2015 season, but new coach Greg Lovelady brought Bahr back on the team in 2017.

=== San Francisco Giants ===
The San Francisco Giants selected Bahr in the fifth round, with the 156th overall selection, of the 2017 MLB draft. He signed and made his professional debut with the Low–A Salem-Keizer Volcanoes where he was 3–2 with a 3.55 ERA in 13 games (seven starts). Bahr began 2018 with the Single–A Augusta GreenJackets and was promoted to the High–A San Jose Giants in June.

=== Texas Rangers ===
On July 8, 2018, the Giants traded Bahr, Austin Jackson, and Cory Gearrin to the Texas Rangers in exchange for a PTBNL or cash considerations. He finished the year with the Down East Wood Ducks of the High–A Carolina League. In 24 starts between Augusta, San Jose and the Ducks, he went 10–8 with a 3.52 ERA. Bahr was assigned back to Down East to open the 2019 season, and went 6–1 with a 1.71 ERA in 58 innings for them. On June 21, he was promoted to the Frisco RoughRiders of the Double-A Texas League, and went 4–3 with a 3.23 ERA in 64 innings for them. Bahr was named the Texas Rangers 2019 Nolan Ryan Minor League Pitcher of the Year.

Bahr did not play in a game in 2020 due to the cancellation of the minor league season because of the COVID-19 pandemic. Bahr spent the 2021 season with the Round Rock Express of the Triple-A West, struggling to a 2–1 record with a 9.00 ERA over 33 innings. Bahr returned to Round Rock to open the 2022 season. After posting a 5.90 ERA with 46 strikeouts over 20 appearances, Bahr was released by the Rangers organization on July 25.
