= Tristen Lutz =

American baseball player (born 1998)

Free agent
- Outfielder
- Born: August 22, 1998 (age 27); Arlington, Texas, U.S.
- Bats: Right Throws: Right

Tristen Drew Lutz (born August 22, 1998) is an American professional baseball outfielder who is a free agent. He was drafted by the Milwaukee Brewers in the first round of the 2017 MLB draft.

== Career ==
During his senior season at Martin High School, Lutz batted .430 while hitting 11 home runs and drove in 49 RBI. Lutz committed to the University of Texas before being selected with the 34th overall pick in the 2017 Major League Baseball draft by the Milwaukee Brewers

On July 5, 2017, Lutz signed with the Brewers and earned a signing bonus of $2.4 million. After signing with Brewers, Lutz was assigned to the Arizona League Brewers. In just 16 games, Lutz hit .279/.347/.559 while hitting three home runs and driving in 11 runs before being promoting to the Helena Brewers. He finished out the rest of the season in the Pioneer League with Helena hitting .333/.432/.559 with six home runs and 16 RBI in 24 games. He spent 2018 with the Wisconsin Timber Rattlers, slashing .245/.321/.421 with 13 home runs and 63 RBI in 119 games. He spent 2019 with the Carolina Mudcats, batting .255 with 13 home runs and 54 RBI over 112 games.

Lutz did not play in a game in 2020 due to the cancellation of the minor league season because of the COVID-19 pandemic. In 2021, he played with the Biloxi Shuckers where he hit .217 with seven home runs and 31 RBI over 64 games. Lutz returned to Biloxi in 2022, playing in 71 games and batting .259/.353/.443 with 12 home runs and 58 RBI. He again returned to Biloxi for the 2023 season, playing in 48 games and hitting .221/.348/.377 with six home runs and 24 RBI. On August 9, 2023, Lutz was released by the Brewers organization.
