= Burnsville High School =

Public high school in Minnesota, USA

Location
- 600 East Highway 13; Burnsville, Minnesota 55337; United States; 44°47′05″N 93°15′57″W

Information
- School type: Taxes/alumni, public high school
- Established: 1957
- School district: Burnsville-Eagan-Savage Independent School District 191
- Superintendent: Theresa Battle
- School code: ISD 191
- Principal: Jesus Sandoval
- Teaching staff: 111.63 (FTE)
- Grades: 9 – 12
- Gender: Co-ed
- Age range: 14-19
- Student to teacher ratio: 18.81
- Hours in school day: 6.6
- Colors: Black and gold
- Athletics conference: South Suburban Conference
- Sports: football, basketball, baseball, hockey, soccer
- Mascot: Sparky
- Team name: Blaze
- Rival: Apple Valley
- Newspaper: The Voice (online)
- Yearbook: The Blaze
- Communities served: Burnsville, Savage, Eagan, Shakopee, Apple Valley
- Website: www.isd191.org/bhs/
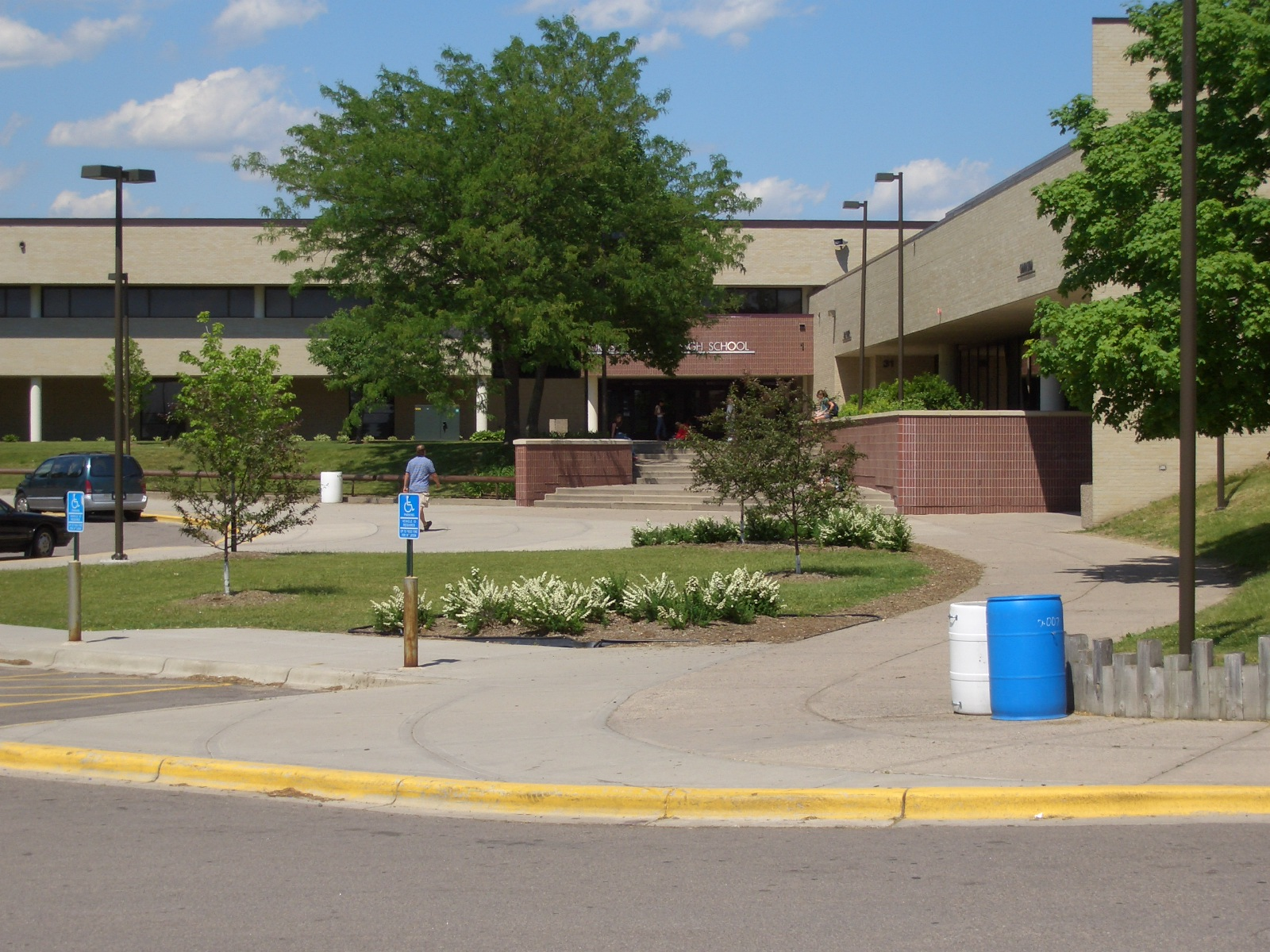

Burnsville High School (BHS) is a four-year public high school in Burnsville, Minnesota, United States. Burnsville is a southern suburb about 15 miles south of Minneapolis. The school is part of Burnsville-Eagan-Savage School District 191, which covers most of Burnsville, as well as parts of the surrounding cities Savage and Eagan, and small parts of Shakopee and Apple Valley. Most of the incoming freshmen come from Eagle Ridge and Nicollet Middle Schools. The school mascot is Sparky, a humanoid with a fireball for a head. Burnsville High School athletics are a part of the South Suburban Conference.

== History ==
Burnsville High School originally opened in 1956 as a K-12 school with an enrollment of about 400 students. In 1966, upon completion of the newly constructed school, students in grades seven through nine started attending Metcalf Junior High, later renamed Metcalf Middle School, which has since closed. Today, students attending Burnsville's newer Eagle Ridge and Nicollet Middle Schools go on to Burnsville Senior High School for grades 9-12.

On April 25, 1994, the largest high school arson in the United States occurred, which resulted in over $15 million in damages. During the restoration, high school students studied at nearby Nicollet Junior High and Sky Oaks Elementary Schools. The arsonist admitted to starting the fire, as well as fires at Edina High School and Minnetonka High Schools, and pled guilty to three counts of arson in 1999.

Around the time of the fire, the school's mascot was changed from the Braves to the Blaze to avoid stigmatizing and stereotyping Native Americans. Prior to the Braves, the first mascot of Burnsville High School was the Bulldogs.

In 1997, District 191 bought the Diamondhead Mall and converted the top level into the Senior Campus to handle increasing enrollment. A year later, it was opened for use. At the end of the 2015–16 school year, the Burnsville High School Senior Campus closed permanently, and is now used for school district offices.

Former Burnsville logo

The original portion of Burnsville High School was constructed in 1959, with additions in 1962, 1971, 1976, 1977, 1980, 1993, 1998, and 2016, that bring the school's area to over 440,000 square feet.

A three-year, $13 million renovation began in 2011. Renovations included upgrades to the building's science labs, heating system, bathrooms and classrooms, and made the school more accessible to people with disabilities. Lockers were replaced, the cafeteria was enlarged and reconfigured, and a larger, more open commons was created.

On February 24, 2015, voters from around the school district voted to approve a funding levy to transform Burnsville High School into a 9-12 school, close the Senior Campus, and convert junior highs into 6-8 middle schools, and elementary schools into K-5 schools. As a result of the increased number of students, Burnsville High School required an expansion, including classrooms, new fabrication and auto labs, a new gymnasium, and further renovations.

The school participates in the University of Minnesota's College in the Schools program.

== Demographics ==
As of the 2017–18 school year, 2,534 students attended Burnsville High School. White students made up 50% of the student population, while African American students made up the largest minority, representing 20% of the student population. Asian and Hispanic students made up 9% and 16% of the student population, respectively. American Indian students made up less than 1% of the student population. 52% of the student body was male and 48% female. Students eligible for free or reduced price lunch made up 41% of the student body. As of 2011, Students with limited English proficiency made up 5% of the student body. Students with special education needs made up 9% of the student body.

== Curriculum ==
Through the Minnesota state Post Secondary Enrollment Options (PSEO) program, students are eligible to take classes at state colleges and universities.

== Athletics ==
Burnsville High School is affiliated with the Minnesota State High School League (MSHSL) and was a member of the Lake Conference until 2010-11, when it left to join the South Suburban Conference.

State championships
| Season | Sport | Number of championships | Year |
|---|---|---|---|
| Fall | Soccer, boys' | 4 | 1980, 1982, 1990, 1993 |
| Fall | Soccer, girls' | 2 | 1992, 1993 |
| Fall | Cross country running, boys' | 5 | 1976, 1977, 1978, 1979, 1986 |
| Fall | Cross country running, girls' | 1 | 2007 |
| Fall | Football | 5 | 1972, 1980, 1985, 1989, 1991 |
| Fall | Swimming, girls' | 5 | 1981, 1982, 1983, 1985, 2002 |
| Fall | Cheerleading | 4 | 1986, 1987, 1998, 1992, 2011 |
| Fall | Chess | 15 | 1983, 1985, 1987, 1989, 1990, 1991, 1992, 1993, 1999, 2000, 2001, 2002, 2003, 2004, 2005 |
| Winter | Dance team, girls' | 10 | 1982, 1983, 1987, 1990, 1998, 2000, 2001, 2002, 2003, 2008 |
| Winter | Gymnastics, girls' | 4 | 1975, 1977, 1978, 1982 |
| Winter | Gymnastics, boys' | 1 | 1988 |
| Winter | Hockey, boys' | 2 | 1985, 1986 |
| Winter | Swimming, boys' | 2 | 1985, 2007 |
| Winter | Basketball, girls' | 3 | 1977, 1991, 1992 |
| Winter | Drumline | 8 | 1997, 2003, 2004, 2007, 2009, 2010, 2015,2025 |
| Winter | Nordic skiing, girls' | 1 | 2009 |
| Spring | Golf, girls' | 3 | 1990, 2000, 2007 |
| Spring | Baseball, boys' | 1 | 2011 |
| Spring | Badminton, girls' | 4 | 1996, 1997, 1998, 1999 |
| Spring | Track and field, boys' | 1 | 1978 |
| Spring | Softball, girls' | 3 | 2004, 2005, 2010 |
| Total | | 82 | |

== Notable alumni ==
- Jack Ahcan (class of 2015), professional hockey player
- Ryan Amoroso (class of 2004), professional basketball player
- Cameron Beckman (class of 1988), professional golfer
- Lauren Bench (class of 2016), professional hockey player
- Brock Boeser (class of 2015), professional hockey player
- Todd Boonstra (class of 1980), Olympic cross-country skier
- Janell Cannon (class of 1975), author and illustrator
- Sam Carlson (class of 2017), professional baseball player
- Nate DiCasmirro (class of 1997), professional hockey player
- TeTori Dixon (class of 2010), volleyball player for Team USA
- Kelsey Mann (class of 1993), director and animator at Pixar
- Holly Manthei (class of 1994), member of the 1995 US Women's World Cup Team
- Kamal Martin (class of 2016), professional football player
- Pam Myhra (class of 1975), Minnesota state representative
- Todd Okerlund (class of 1983), Olympic hockey player
- Kirsten Olson (class of 2010), figure skater and actor
- Mark Osiecki (class of 1987), NHL player and college hockey coach
- Melissa Peterman (class of 1989), actor
- Chase Roullier (class of 2012), professional football player
- James Ruffin (class of 2005), professional football player
- Randy Scheunemann (class of 1978), lobbyist and foreign policy advisor to John McCain
- Tyler Sheehy (class of 2013), professional hockey player
- C. J. Smith (class of 2011), professional football player
- Jason Suttle (class of 1993), professional football player
- Cedric Yarbrough (class of 1991), actor
- Vince Workman (class of 2004), Burnsville City Council Member
- Emma Fee (class of 2017), Professional Basketball Player
