= Keston Hiura =

American baseball player (born 1996)

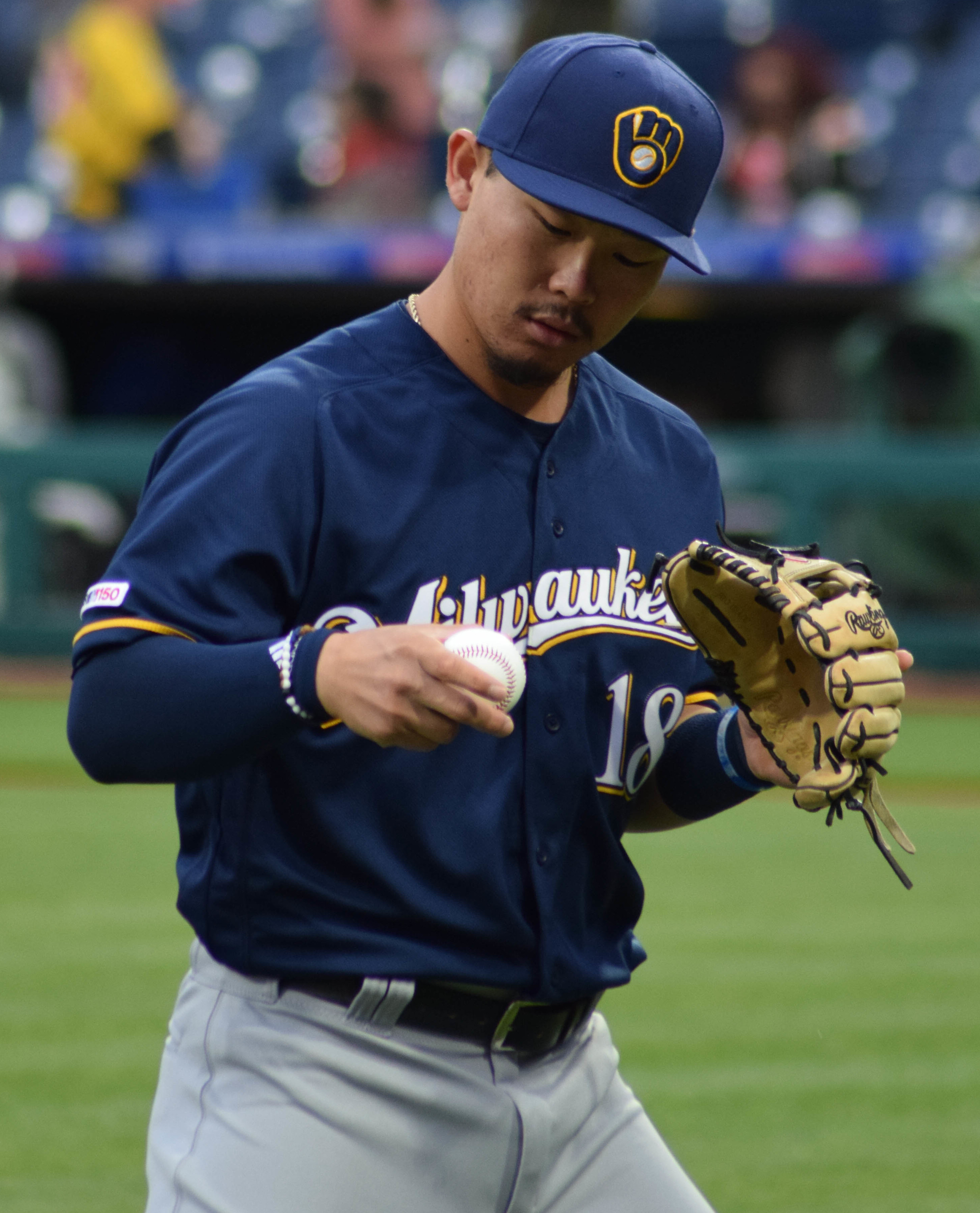
- Hiura with the Milwaukee Brewers in 2019

Kiwoom Heroes – No. 22
- First baseman / Second baseman
- Born: August 2, 1996 (age 30); Valencia, California, U.S.
- Bats: Right Throws: Right

Professional debut
- MLB: May 14, 2019, for the Milwaukee Brewers
- KBO: May 30, 2026, for the Kiwoom Heroes

MLB statistics (through 2025 season)
- Batting average: .235
- Home runs: 50
- Runs batted in: 134

KBO statistics (through August 15, 2026)
- Batting average: .254
- Home runs: 7
- Runs batted in: 27
- Stats at Baseball Reference

Teams
- Milwaukee Brewers (2019–2022); Los Angeles Angels (2024); Colorado Rockies (2025); Kiwoom Heroes (2026–present)

Keston Wee Hing Natsuo Hiura (HEER-uh; born August 2, 1996) is an American professional baseball first baseman and second baseman for the Kiwoom Heroes of the KBO League. He has previously played in Major League Baseball (MLB) for the Milwaukee Brewers, Los Angeles Angels, and Colorado Rockies.

Hiura attended Valencia High School. He played three seasons of college baseball for the UC Irvine Anteaters, earning conference accolades and playing for the United States collegiate national team in the offseason. Hiura signed with the Brewers after they selected him with the ninth overall selection in the 2017 MLB draft.

Hiura spent three seasons in the Brewers farm system and was acclaimed as the organization's top prospect by his second minor league season. He made his major league debut in 2019, with a .303 batting average in 84 games. After his rookie season, Hiura's statistics regressed, including a National League (NL)-leading 85 strikeouts in 2020 and a .168 batting average in 2021.

Hiura became a free agent after the 2023 season and played briefly with the Angels in 2024 and Rockies in 2025.

== Amateur career ==
Hiura attended Valencia High School in Valencia, Santa Clarita, California. Playing for the school's baseball team, he batted .500 with 14 home runs and 30 runs batted in (RBIs) in his senior year as the Vikings won the Foothill League.

Undrafted out of high school, Hiura played college baseball at the University of California, Irvine for the Anteaters. As a freshman in 2015, he hit .330 with a .392 on-base percentage (OBP), a .520 slugging percentage (SLG), seven home runs, and 52 RBIs over 56 games. As a sophomore in 2016, he hit .358 with a .436 OBP, .559 SLG, seven home runs, and 41 RBIs over 53 games. After the season, Hiura played for the United States national collegiate team, batting .289 with a team-leading 3 home runs in 17 games. In his junior year, he hit .442 with a .567 OBP. He was named the Big West Conference Player of the Year.

Hiura was inducted into the UC Irvine Hall of Fame in 2026.

== Professional career ==
=== Milwaukee Brewers ===
The Milwaukee Brewers selected Hiura in the first round, with the ninth overall selection in the 2017 Major League Baseball draft. He signed, receiving a $4 million signing bonus, and was assigned to the Arizona Brewers of the Rookie-level Arizona League. After batting .435 with four home runs, 18 RBIs and a 1.339 OPS in 15 games, he advanced to the Wisconsin Timber Rattlers of the Single-A Midwest League where he had a .333 batting average with 15 RBIs and seven walks in 27 games.

MLB.com ranked Hiura as Milwaukee's top prospect going into the 2018 season. He began the season with the Carolina Mudcats of the High-A Carolina League and was promoted to the Biloxi Shuckers of the Double-A Southern League on June 1 after hitting .320 with seven home runs, 23 RBIs, and a .911 OPS in 50 games for Carolina. Hiura finished the year with Biloxi, batting .272 with six home runs, twenty RBIs, and 11 stolen bases in 73 games. After the regular season, Hiura won the Arizona Fall League Most Valuable Player Award.

Hiura began 2019 with the San Antonio Missions. On May 14, his contract was selected and he was called up to the major leagues. He made his major league debut on May 14 versus the Philadelphia Phillies. On June 3, despite a strong showing in the majors, Hiura was sent back down to Triple-A to the San Antonio Missions in order to make room for Travis Shaw. Hiura returned to the Brewers on June 28 along with infielder Tyler Saladino, as Shaw returned to Triple-A and utility player Hernán Pérez was designated for assignment. On July 28, Hiura homered in the bottom of the 10th inning against the Chicago Cubs for his first career walk-off hit. He was named the National League (NL) Rookie of the Month for July, batting .355 with a 1.127 OPS. After a brief injury, he finished his rookie season batting .303 with 19 home runs and 49 RBI in 84 games. He was named to Baseball America's All-Rookie Team. On defense he led all major league second basemen in errors, with 16. In the NL Wild Card Game, he hit a double and struck out three times in a loss to the eventual World Series champion Washington Nationals.

In the pandemic-shortened 2020 season, Hiura batted .212/.297/.410, leading the Brewers with 13 home runs and 32 RBI, in 59 games. He led the NL in strikeouts (85), as well as putouts (66) and errors (16) by a second baseman. He had a .168 batting average in 2021 61 games, starting more games at first base than second base. In 2022, Hiura played in 80 games for Milwaukee and hit .226/.316/.449 with 14 home runs and 32 RBI.

On January 13, 2023, Hiura agreed to a one-year, $2.2 million contract with the Brewers, avoiding salary arbitration. On March 25, the Brewers announced that Hiura, who was out of options, did not make the Opening Day roster. He did not play in the majors that season. He was designated for assignment two days later after the team signed Luke Voit. Hiura went unclaimed on waivers and was sent outright to the Triple-A Nashville Sounds on March 28. In 85 games for Triple-A Nashville, he batted .308/.395/.565 with 23 home runs and 77 RBI. On October 4, Hiura elected free agency.

=== Detroit Tigers ===
On February 16, 2024, Hiura signed a minor league contract with the Detroit Tigers. In 49 games with Triple-A Toledo Mud Hens, he hit .232/.312/.401 with 6 home runs and 24 RBI. The Tigers released Hiura on June 3.

=== Los Angeles Angels ===
On June 11, 2024, Hiura signed a minor league contract with the Los Angeles Angels. In 19 games for the Triple-A Salt Lake Bees, he hit .360/.429/.853 with 12 home runs and 21 RBI. On July 5, the Angels selected Hiura's contract, adding him to the major league roster. In 10 games for Los Angeles, he went 4-for-27 (.148) with one RBI. On July 23, Hiura was designated for assignment by the Angels. He cleared waivers and was sent outright to Salt Lake on July 27. Hiura elected free agency on October 2.

=== Colorado Rockies ===
On January 15, 2025, Hiura signed a minor league contract with the Colorado Rockies. In 46 appearances for the Triple-A Albuquerque Isotopes, he batted .243/.360/.467 with nine home runs and 31 RBI. On May 31, the Rockies selected Hiura's contract, adding him to their active roster. In eight games for Colorado, he went 4-for-18 (.222) with one RBI. On June 16, Hiura was designated for assignment by the Rockies. He cleared waivers and was sent outright to Triple-A on June 18. Hiura elected free agency on September 30.

=== Kiwoom Heroes ===
On February 12, 2026, Hiura signed a minor league contract with the Los Angeles Dodgers. He was released by the Dodgers organization on April 3.

On May 18, 2026, Hiura signed a one-year, $400,000 contract with the Kiwoom Heroes of the KBO League.

On November 19, 2026, Hiura re-signed with the Heroes on a one-year contract with $800,000

== Personal life ==
Hiura was born to a Chinese-American mother and a Japanese-American father. He grew up a Los Angeles Dodgers fan.
