= Warning track =

Part of a baseball field that is closest to the wall

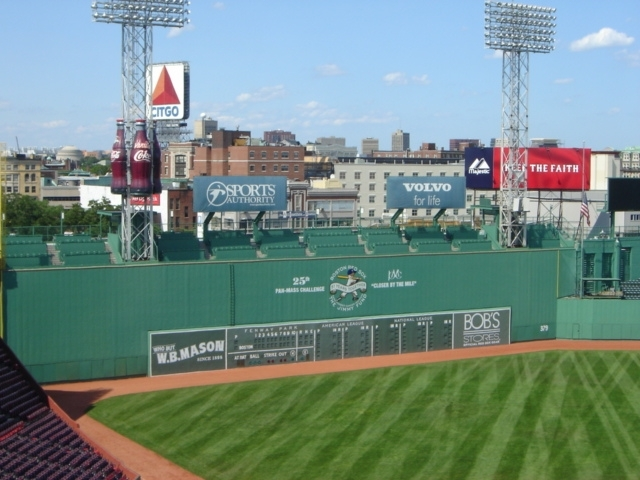
The orange-colored clay warning track is seen between the outfield grass and the Green Monster, the left field wall at Fenway Park.

The warning track is the part of the baseball field that is closest to the wall or fence and is made of a different material than the field. Common materials for the warning track include dirt or rubber. The change of terrain serves as a "warning" for fielders trying to make a deep catch that they are running out of room, since it is often difficult for the fielder to keep his eye on a fly ball while keeping track of his position relative to the wall. It runs parallel to the ballpark's outfield wall. The track can also be utilized by vehicles on grass fields, thus preserving the playing field.

Despite the warning track's presence, it is common to see outfielders crash into the wall to make a catch, due to a desire to field the play regardless of the outcome; because they fail to register the warning in time, as they are looking up at the fly ball; or because they do not know how many steps they will have on the track.

The "track" part of the term comes from Old Yankee Stadium, where an actual running track was built for the use of track and field events. In 1949 Major League Baseball formally began requiring a warning track. There still are professional fields without a proper warning track, however, such as Rogers Centre and Tropicana Field, which use brown-colored turf.

The width of warning tracks can vary by rules and level of play. In general it is designed to give fielders three steps of warning before the outfield wall. The warning tracks in Major League Parks are roughly 16 feet (5 m) wide, while the warning track in Olympic stadiums are roughly 20 feet (6 m) wide, and on softball fields are often 10 feet (3 m). When Major League Baseball instituted the warning track, it was 10 feet (3 m) wide.
