= Attention marketing =

Attention marketing is a term coined by internet entrepreneur Steve Jelley to describe a specific business model that has evolved around the growth of social media. It was popularized by the book Purple Cow: Transform Your Business by Being Remarkable by Seth Godin.

This concept is designed around the idea of capturing and engaging the attention of online consumer as opposed to interrupting users directly through the use of things like traditional pop-up ads and commercials.

Rather than interrupting users' attention in order to market to them, the business opportunity available to social media is in capturing people’s attention and channeling this attention to an appropriate vendor when it presents itself as a genuine desire to buy.

Previously, it was very difficult and expensive for business to market themselves on anything other than a mass, or broadcast basis. Targeting messages to individuals, at any kind of effective scale, was all but impossible. But social media has changed that. By using social media channels to target according to users' attention, business and other organisations can make their messages far more relevant and appropriate to individual consumers.

For businesses to suddenly shift commercial focus from the mass attention of a broad audience to the particular attention of individuals, however, requires a complete change of corporate mindset. Inside media and marketing organisations, content production, distribution and marketing have traditionally occupied different - and usually warring - silos. Because of the intimate connection between the content and the opportunity to create a lead, however, attention marketing necessarily collapses these silos and brings them together.
