= World Series =

Major League Baseball championship

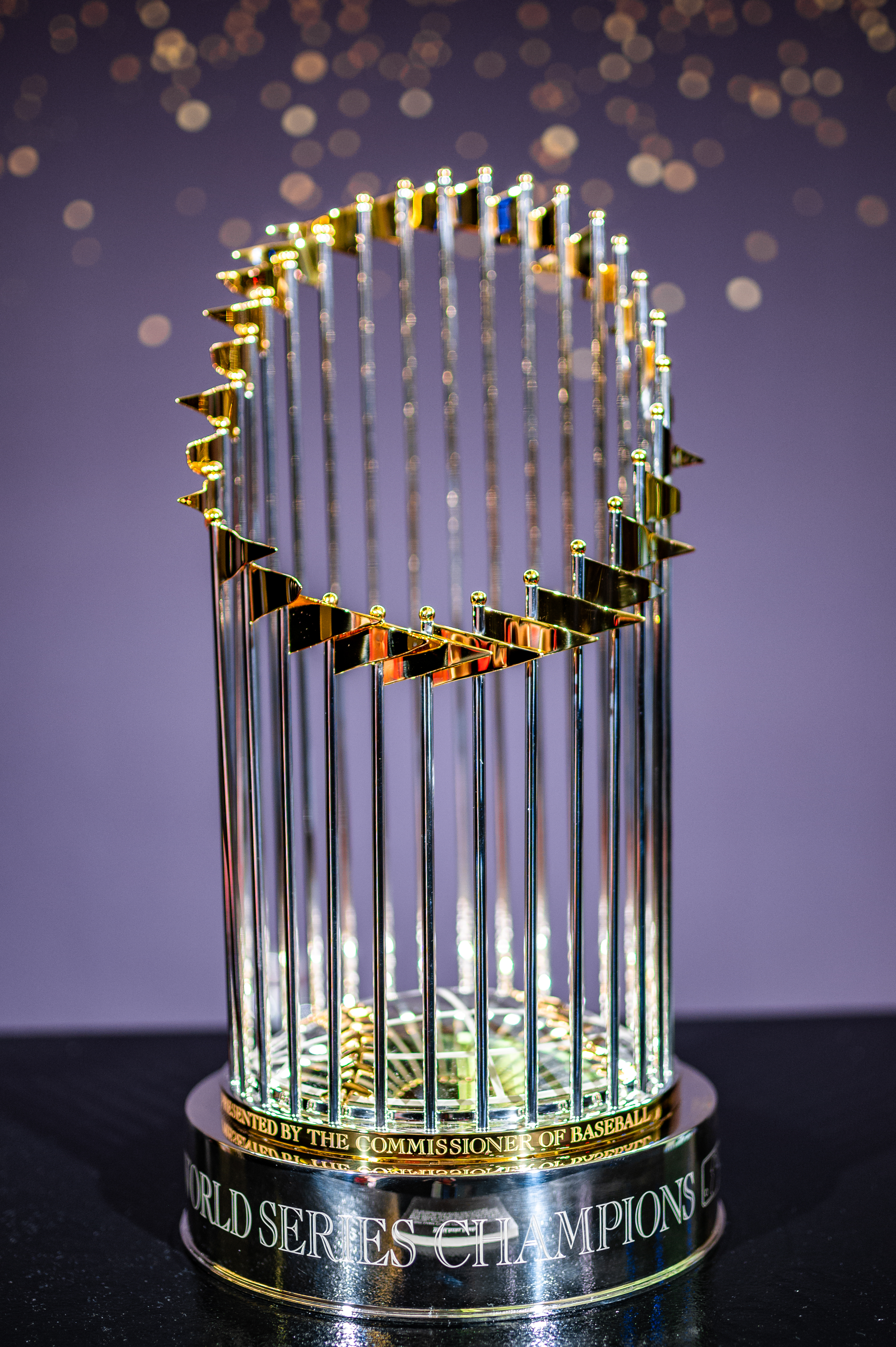
- Commissioner's Trophy

Tournament information
- Sport: Baseball
- Month played: Late October–early November
- Established: 1903
- Administrator: Major League Baseball
- Format: Best-of-seven series
- Teams: 2
- Defending champions: Milwaukee Brewers (1st title)
- Most championships: New York Yankees (27 titles)
- Broadcast: United States: Fox (English); Fox Deportes (Spanish); ESPN Radio (English); TUDN Radio (Spanish); Canada: Sportsnet (English); TVA Sports (French, odd-numbered years); Réseau des sports (French, even-numbered years); International: MLB International

Most recent tournament
- 2026 World Series

The World Series is the annual championship series of Major League Baseball (MLB), a professional baseball league operating in the United States and Canada, contested between the champion teams of the American League (AL) and the National League (NL). The winning team, determined through a best-of-seven playoff (Note: A best-of-nine format was used in the 1903, 1919, 1920, and 1921 editions of the World Series.), is declared the champion team of the major leagues (often called "world champions") and awarded the Commissioner's Trophy. The series was first played in 1903, after the American League declared itself the second major-league circuit in the US, to compete with the previously established National League.

The series is traditionally played in October, although due to the expansion of the MLB postseason it has occasionally been contested into November. Because the series is played in the fall (autumn) season in North America, it is often referred to as the Fall Classic.

Qualification to the World Series is determined through a postseason tournament consisting of six teams per league — three teams that won their respective divisions and three teams that achieved the best win-loss record overall but failed to clinch a division title. The team which wins its league's tournament thereby clinches the league pennant and qualifies for the World Series against the other league's pennant winner.

Prior to the AL and NL being split into divisions in 1969, the team with the best regular-season win–loss record in each league clinched that league's pennant and advanced to the World Series, barring a tie necessitating a pennant playoff. Since the introduction of the Major League Baseball postseason playoff format in 1969, each league has conducted a League Championship Series (ALCS and NLCS) preceding the World Series to determine which of its teams will advance, while those series have been preceded in turn by Division Series (ALDS and NLDS) since 1995, and Wild Card games or series in each league since 2012. Until 2002, home-field advantage in the World Series alternated from year to year between the AL and NL. From 2003 to 2016, home-field advantage was given to the league that won that year's All-Star Game. Starting in 2017, home-field advantage was awarded to the league champion team with the better regular-season win–loss record regardless of that team's seeding in earlier postseason rounds (i.e. a Wild Card team in one league will be given home-field advantage over a division winner in the other league if it had the better record or wins the tie-breaking procedure).

The World Series has been contested 122 times through 2026, with the AL team winning 68 times and the NL team 54. The current World Series champions are the Milwaukee Brewers of the National League, who defeated the AL's Tampa Bay Rays in five games.

== Precursors to the modern World Series (1857–1902) ==
=== The original World Series ===
Before 1882, when the American Association was formed as a second major league, the National Association of Professional Base Ball Players (1871–1875) and then the National League (founded 1876) represented the top level of organized baseball in the United States. All championships were awarded to the team with the best record at the end of the season, without a postseason series being played. From 1884 to 1890, the National League and the American Association faced each other in a series of games at the end of the season to determine an overall champion. These series were disorganized in comparison to the modern World Series, with the terms arranged through negotiation of the owners of the championship teams beforehand. The number of games played ranged from as few as three in 1884 (Providence defeated New York three games to zero), to a high of fifteen in 1887 (Detroit beat St. Louis ten games to five). Both the 1885 and 1890 Series ended in ties, each team having won three games with one tie game.

The series was promoted and referred to as "The Championship of the United States", "World's Championship Series", or "World's Series" for short. An urban myth holds the name "World Series" came from a putative sponsorship by the New York World newspaper. The earliest such claim found by Snopes was made in 1991 by Nick Auf der Maur. Ben Zimmer posits confusion with The World Almanac, whose name does reflect being founded by the newspaper.

The 19th-century competitions are not officially recognized as part of World Series history by Major League Baseball, which considers 19th-century baseball to be a prologue to the modern baseball era. As late as approximately 1960, some sources treated the 19th-century series on an equal basis with the 20th-century series. After about 1930, however, many authorities date the modern World Series to 1903 and discuss the earlier contests separately. (For example, the 1929 World Almanac lists "Baseball World's Championships 1884–1928" in a single table, while the 1943 edition lists "Baseball World's Championships 1903–1942".)

=== 1892–1900: "The Monopoly Years" ===
Following the collapse of the American Association after the 1891 season, the National League was again the only major league. The league championship was awarded in 1892 by a playoff between split season champions. This scheme was abandoned after one season. Beginning in 1893—and continuing until divisional play was introduced in 1969—the pennant was awarded to the first-place club in the standings at the end of the season. For four seasons, 1894–1897, the league champions played the runners-up in the postseason championship series called the Temple Cup. A second attempt at this format was the Chronicle-Telegraph Cup series, which was played only once, in 1900.

In 1901, the American League was formed as a second major league. No championship series were played in 1901 or 1902 as the National and American Leagues fought each other for business supremacy (in 1902, the top teams instead opted to compete in a football championship).

== Modern World Series (1903–present) ==
=== First attempt ===
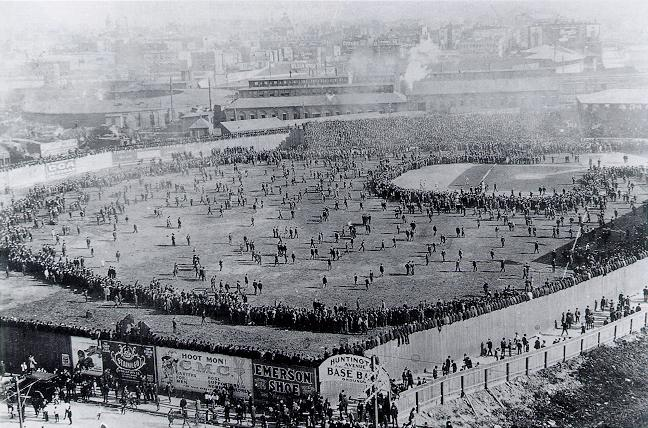
An overflow crowd at the Huntington Avenue Grounds in Boston prior to Game 3 of the 1903 World Series

After two years of bitter competition and player raiding, the National and American Leagues made peace and, as part of the new accord, several pairs of teams squared off for interleague exhibition games following the 1903 season. These series were arranged by the participating clubs, as the 1880s World's Series matches had been. One of them, a best-of-nine affair matching that year's pennant winners – the Pittsburgh Pirates of the NL and Boston Americans (later known as the Red Sox) of the AL – has come to be regarded as the 1903 World Series. It had been arranged well in advance by the two club owners, as both teams were league leaders by large margins.

Boston upset Pittsburgh by five games to three, winning with pitching depth behind Cy Young and Bill Dinneen and with the support of the band of Royal Rooters.

=== Boycott of 1904 ===
The 1904 Series, if it had been held, would have been between the AL's Boston Americans (Boston Red Sox) and the NL's New York Giants (now the San Francisco Giants). At that point there was no governing body for the World Series nor any requirement that a Series be played. Thus the Giants' owner John T. Brush refused to allow his team to participate in such an event, citing the "inferiority" of the upstart American League. John McGraw, the Giants' manager, even went so far as to say that his Giants were already "world champions" since they were the champions of the "only real major league".

At the time of the announcement, their new cross-town rivals, the New York Highlanders (now the New York Yankees), were leading the AL, and the prospect of facing the Highlanders did not please Giants management. Boston won on the last day of the season, and the leagues had previously agreed to hold a World's Championship Series in 1904, but it was not binding, and Brush stuck to his original decision. In addition to political reasons, Brush also cited a number of legitimate grievances, including the lack of rules under which revenue would be split, where games would be played, and how they would be operated and staffed.

=== 1905-1920: Emergence of formal Series rules, the dead ball era, and the first dynasty ===
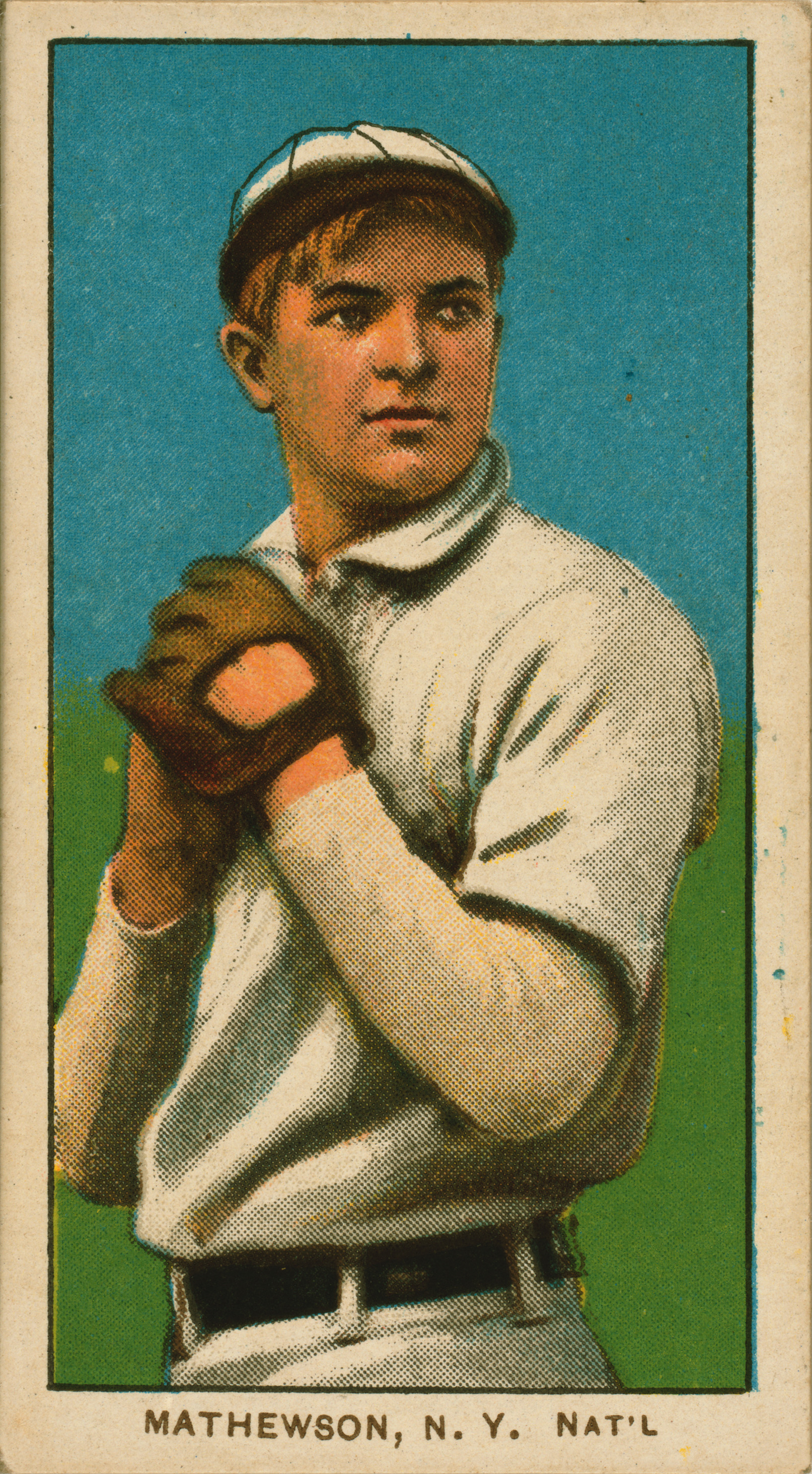
Christy Mathewson threw 3 complete-game shutouts in the 1905 World Series.

During the winter of 1904–1905, however, feeling the sting of press criticism, Brush had a change of heart and proposed what came to be known as the "Brush Rules", under which the series were played subsequently. One rule was that player shares would come from a portion of the gate receipts for the first four games only. This was to discourage teams from fixing early games in order to prolong the series and make more money. Receipts for later games was split among the two clubs and the National Baseball Commission, then the governing body for the sport, which was able to cover much of its annual operating expense from World Series revenue. Most importantly, the now-official and compulsory World Series matches were operated strictly by the National Commission itself, not by the participating clubs.

With the new rules in place and the National Commission in control, McGraw's Giants made it to the 1905 Series and beat the Philadelphia Athletics four games to one. Since then the Series has been held every year except 1994, when it was canceled by a players' strike. The name of the event, initially known as the World's Championship Series, was gradually shortened in common usage to "World's Series" and, by the 1930s, to "World Series".

The list of postseason rules evolved over time. From 1919 to 1921, the best-of-nine format first used in 1903 was employed. In 1925, Brooklyn owner Charles Ebbets persuaded others to adopt as a permanent rule the 2–3–2 home game pattern first used in 1924. Previously, the pattern had been to alternate by game or to make another arrangement convenient to both clubs. The 2–3–2 pattern has been used ever since except for the 1943 and 1945 World Series, which used a 3–4 pattern to comply with World War II travel restrictions; in 1944, the normal pattern was followed because both teams were based in the same home ballpark.

The Dead-ball era, a period in Major League Baseball from roughly 1900 to 1920, was defined by low scoring, small ball strategy, and very few home runs. A single baseball was often used for an entire game until it was soft, dark, and misshapen, giving pitchers a massive advantage.

During the early years of the league, the Boston Red Sox became the first league dynasty spanned from 1912 to 1918, during which they dominated the dead-ball era and captured four World Series championships. The dynasty ended when Red Sox's owner Harry Frazee traded Babe Ruth to the Yankees for cash on January 5, 1920, which allegedly led to the team being cursed for over 85 years.

==== 1919 Black Sox Scandal ====
Gambling and game-fixing had been a problem in professional baseball from the beginning; star pitcher Jim Devlin was banned for life in 1877 when the National League was just two years old. Baseball's gambling problems came to a head in 1919, when eight players of the Chicago White Sox were alleged to have been bribed to lose the 1919 World Series.

The White Sox had won the World Series in 1917 and were favourites to beat the Cincinnati Reds in 1919. It was alleged the White Sox players were promised $100,000 if they ensured they lost the best-of-nine series in eight games.

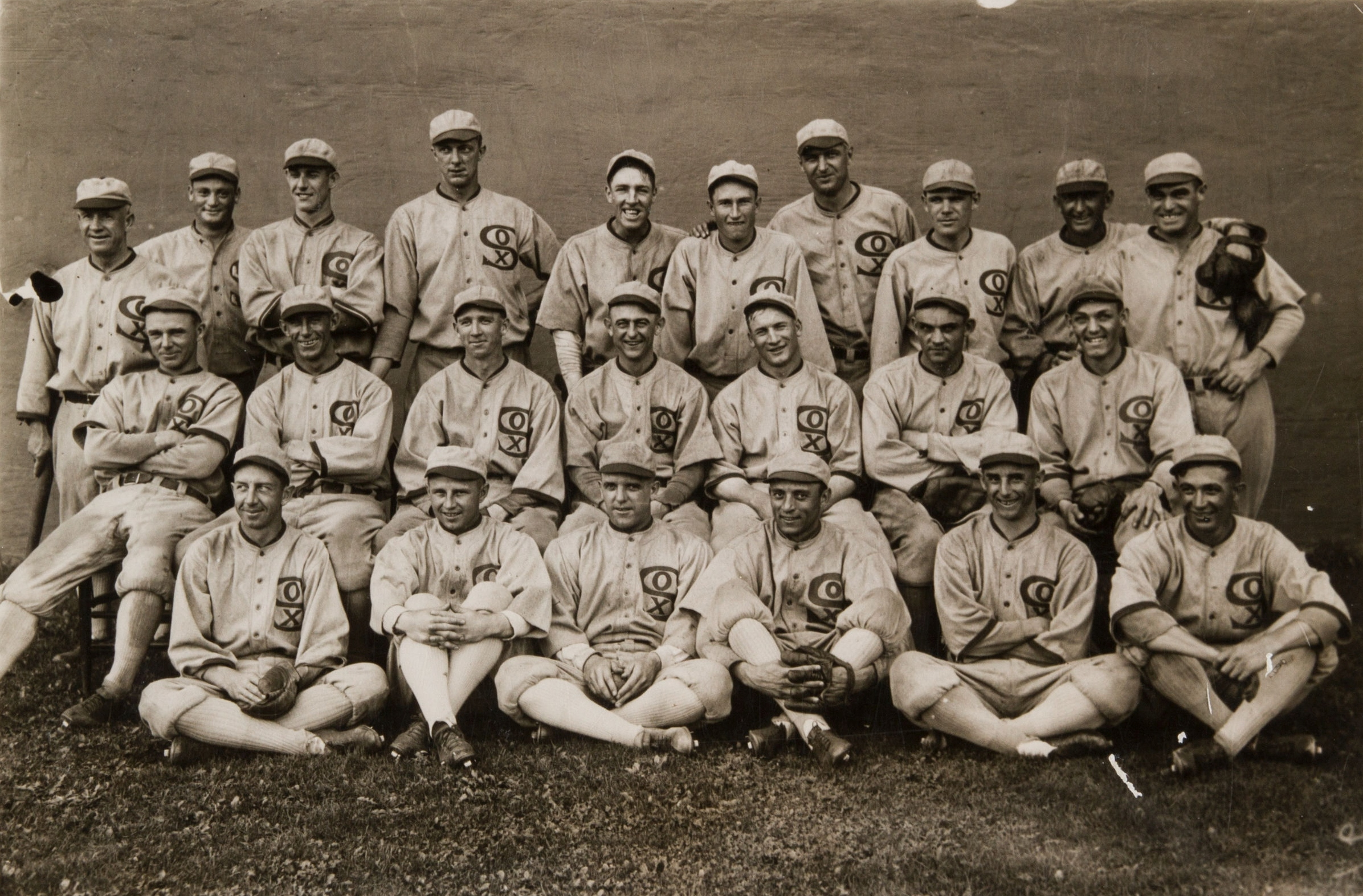
The 1919 Chicago White Sox team photo

The eight players indicted for allegedly accepting bribes were Eddie Cicotte, Oscar "Happy" Felsch, Arnold "Chick" Gandil, "Shoeless" Joe Jackson, Fred McMullin, Charles "Swede" Risberg, George "Buck" Weaver, and Claude "Lefty" Williams. The men believed to be behind the betting scandal were Abe Attell, Bill Burns, Arnold Rothstein, Billy Maharg, and Joseph "Sport" Sullivan.

In the proceeding trial Cicotte, Jackson, and Williams admitted to the grand jury they had taken the bribes to throw the series. Jackson and Williams would later withdraw these statements. Rothstein also testified before the grand jury but his testimony was either lost or stolen. The case would eventually fall apart due to a lack of evidence and the indictments lifted. Despite being cleared by the courts the first Baseball Commissioner, Judge Kenesaw Mountain Landis, banned all eight players from playing baseball for life.

Though he admitted taking the money at the initial court hearing, Jackson insisted until his death that he hadn't thrown the series and played to the best of his ability (he was the best hitter in the series, including having hit the series' only home run, but had markedly worse numbers in the games the White Sox lost).

Ring Lardner was very close to the White Sox team at the time of the scandal and often covered them in his writing. Lardner came up with the term "World's Serious" as a way to poke fun at the over inflated ego's and greed of baseball players.

The White Sox would go on an 88 year run of not winning the World Series, they ended this drought in 2005.

=== New York Yankees' dynasty (1921–1964) ===
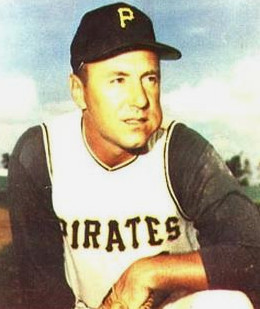
Bill Mazeroski hit a dramatic ninth-inning walk-off home run that decided the 1960 World Series

The New York Yankees purchased Babe Ruth's contract from the Boston Red Sox after the 1919 season, appeared in their first World Series two years later in 1921, and became frequent participants thereafter. The 1921 World Series was the first to be broadcast on radio. Over a period of 45 years from 1921 to 1964, the Yankees played in 29 World Series championships, winning 20. The team's dynasty reached its apex between 1949 and 1964 when the Yankees reached the World Series 14 times in 16 years, helped by an agreement with the Kansas City Athletics, after that team moved from Philadelphia during 1954–1955 offseason, whereby the teams made several deals advantageous to the Yankees, until ended by new Athletics' owner Charles O. Finley.

The Yankees did not feature in the 1924 World Series between the Washington Senators and New York Giants, which historians consider one of the greatest World Series, to this day. Game 7 still holds the record as the longest Game 7 (by innings) in MLB postseason history. It was also the first World Series Game 7 to be decided in extra innings (although the 1912 series ended with a ten-inning Game 8), and the last until 1991.

During that span, the Yankees played in all World Series except 1954 and 1959, winning nine of them. From 1949 to 1953, the Yankees won the World Series five years in a row; from 1936 to 1939 the Yankees won four World Series Championships in a row. There are only two other occasions when a team has won at least three consecutive World Series: 1972 to 1974 by the Oakland Athletics, and 1998 to 2000 by the Yankees. Besides Ruth, the Yankees' run of success was marked by star players, such as Lou Gehrig (1923–1939), Bill Dickey (1928–1943, 1946), Lefty Gomez (1930–1942), Joe DiMaggio (1936–1942, 1946–1951), Yogi Berra (1946–1963), Whitey Ford (1950, 1953–1967), and Mickey Mantle (1951–1968).

==== 1947–1964: Robinson breaks the color barrier, New York City teams dominate World Series play, Don Larsen's perfect game, and relocation ====
In an 18-year span from 1947 to 1964, except for 1948 and 1959, the World Series was played in New York City, featuring at least one of the three teams located in New York at the time. The Dodgers and Giants moved to California after the 1957 season, leaving the Yankees as the lone team in the city until the Mets were enfranchised in 1962. In 1947, 1949, 1951, 1952, 1953, 1955, and 1956, both teams in the World Series were from New York, with the Yankees playing against either the Dodgers or Giants. The Yankees won all these matchups, besides 1955, the year the Dodgers won their first World Series.

In 1947, Jackie Robinson became the first African American player to play in the World Series during his rookie season. In 1956, Don Larsen threw the first, and to date, only World Series perfect game in Game 5.

In 1957, the Milwaukee Braves, formerly the Boston Braves, became the first relocated team to win a World Series. This would become a common occurrence throughout the rest of the history of MLB, as moving franchises became more common due to the Braves success in Milwaukee. Ironically, the Braves would leave Milwaukee for Atlanta in 1966.

=== 1958: The Dodgers and Giants move west ===
==== 1963–1968: Pitching dominance ====
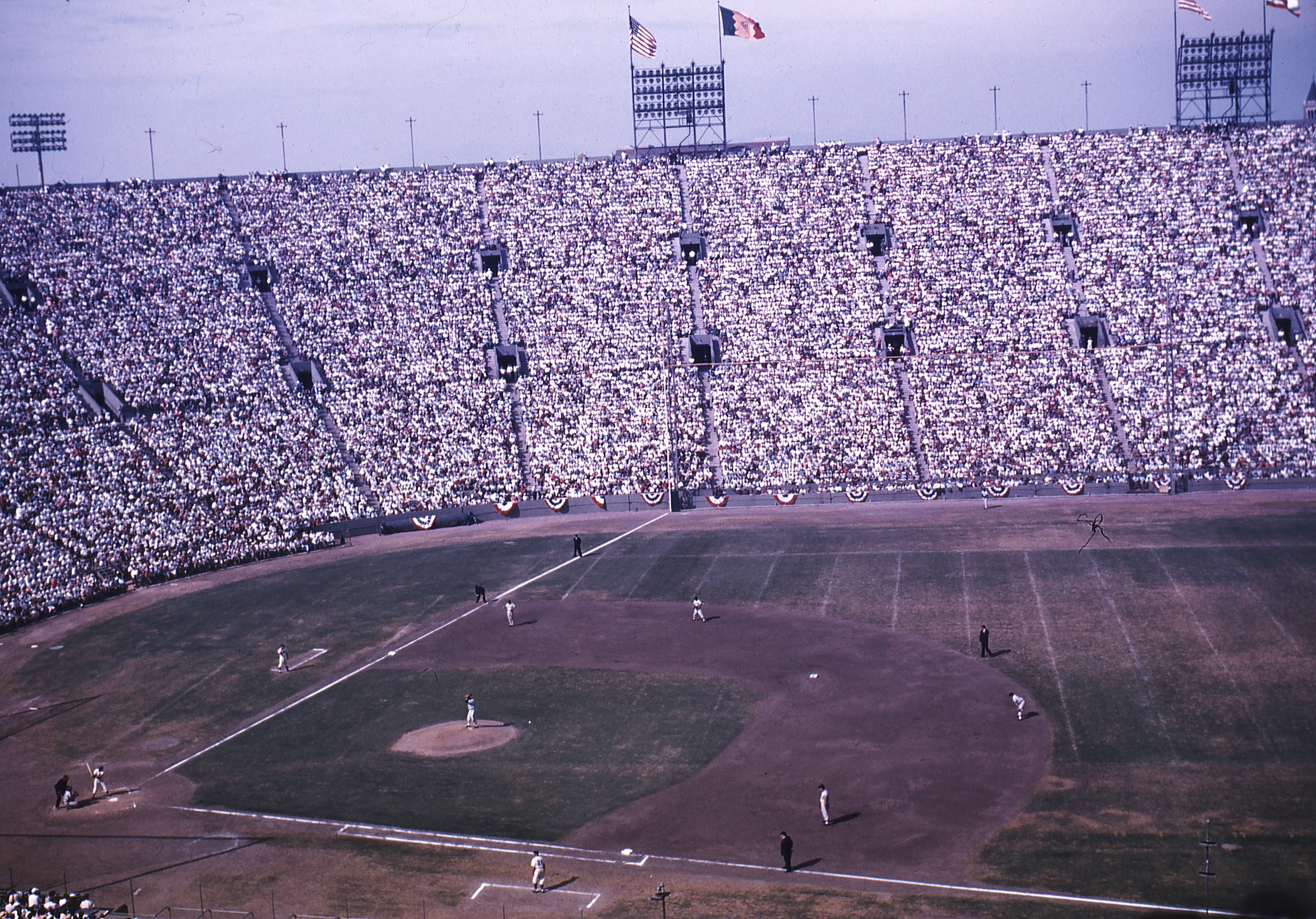
1959 World Series action at the Los Angeles Memorial Coliseum

In 1958, the Brooklyn Dodgers and New York Giants took their long-time rivalry to the west coast, moving to Los Angeles and San Francisco, respectively, bringing Major League Baseball west of St. Louis and Kansas City.

The Dodgers were the first of the two clubs to contest a World Series on the west coast, defeating the Chicago White Sox in 1959. The 1962 Giants made the first California World Series appearance of that franchise, losing to the Yankees. The Dodgers made three World Series appearances in the 1960s, largely due to the pitching brilliance of Sandy Koufax (World Series MVP in 1963 and 1965) and Don Drysdale: a 1963 sweep over the Yankees, a 1965 win over the Minnesota Twins in seven games and a 1966 sweep to the Baltimore Orioles. Meanwhile, the St. Louis Cardinals would win seven-game World Series over the Yankees and Reds Sox in 1964 and 1967, respectively. Starting pitcher Bob Gibson would win World Series MVPs in both years. The pitching dominance would culminate in 1968, known as the "Year of the Pitcher", which saw MLB lower the mound after the season with many dominant pitching seasons. In that year's World Series, Detroit's Mickey Lolich outdueled Gibson in Game 7 to give the Detroit Tigers the 3–1 series comeback and the world championship.

=== 1969: League Championship Series ===
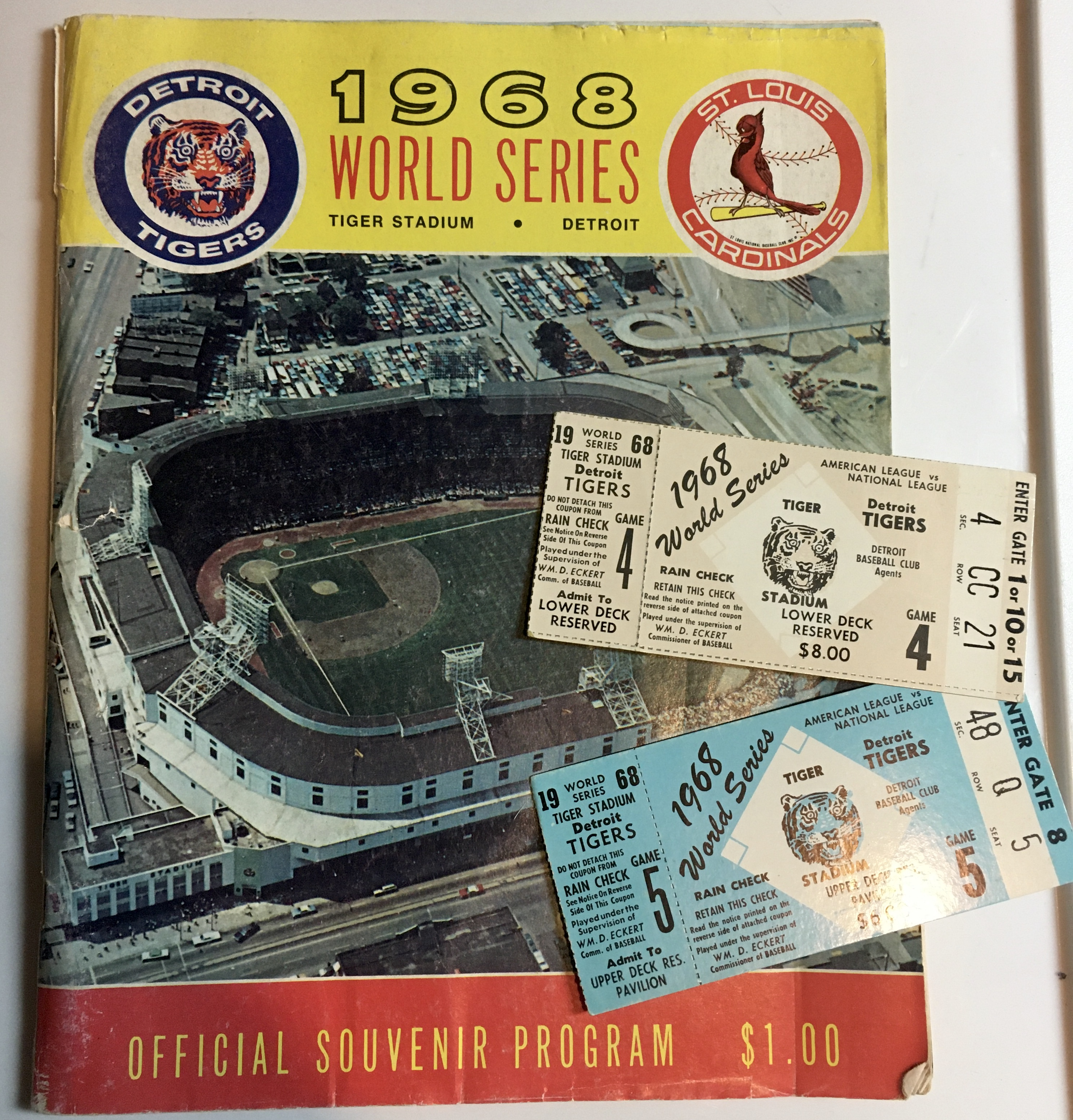
1968 World Series program and tickets for Games 4 and 5 at Tiger Stadium

Prior to 1969, the National League and the American League each crowned its champion (the "pennant winner") based on the best win–loss record at the end of the regular season.

A structured playoff series began in 1969 when both the National and American Leagues were reorganized into two divisions each, East and West. The two division winners within each league played each other in a best-of-five League Championship Series to determine who would advance to the World Series. In 1985, the format changed to best-of-seven.

The National League Championship Series (NLCS) and American League Championship Series (ALCS), since the expansion to best-of-seven, are always played in a 2–3–2 format: Games 1, 2, 6, and 7 are played in the stadium of the team that has home-field advantage, and Games 3, 4, and 5 are played in the stadium of the team that does not.

=== 1970s ===
==== 1971: World Series at night ====
Night games were played in the major leagues beginning with the Cincinnati Reds in 1935, but the World Series remained a strictly daytime event for years thereafter. In the fifth and final game of the 1949 World Series, a Series game was finished under the lights for the first time due to encroaching darkness in the ninth inning. The first scheduled night World Series game was Game 4 of the 1971 World Series at Three Rivers Stadium.

Afterward, World Series games were frequently scheduled at night, when television audiences were larger. Game 6 of the 1987 World Series was the last World Series game played in the daytime, indoors at the Metrodome in Minnesota. The last World Series played outdoors during the day was the final game of the 1984 series in Detroit's Tiger Stadium. The start time of this game (Game 5) was 4:45 PM, making it the last outdoor World Series game to be started during daylight hours, but the game concluded after sunset and the final innings were technically played at night. The last World Series game to be played outdoors entirely during daylight hours was the previous day's game, Game 4, which started at 1:45 PM.

==== 1972–1978: Threepeat, repeats, and Fisk's home run ====
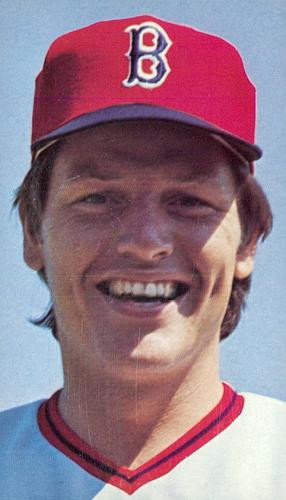
Carlton Fisk, best known for his "waving fair" home run in Game 6 of the 1975 World Series

During this seven-year period, only three teams won the World Series: the Oakland Athletics from 1972 to 1974, Cincinnati Reds in 1975 and 1976, and New York Yankees in 1977 and 1978. This is the only time in World Series history in which three teams have won consecutive series in succession. This period was book-ended by World Championships for the Pittsburgh Pirates, in 1971 and 1979, who defeated the Baltimore Orioles both times.

The less successful side during this era also featured repeats. The Orioles themselves made multiple World Series appearances, including three consecutive: 1969, losing to the "amazing" seven-year-old franchise New York Mets, 1970, beating the Reds in their first World Series appearance of the decade, and their 1971 and 1979 defeats by Pittsburgh. The Los Angeles Dodgers lost to Oakland in 1974, and made back-to-back World Series appearances in 1977 and 1978, both losses to the Yankees.

Game 6 of the 1975 World Series is regarded by most as one of the greatest World Series games ever played. It found the Boston Red Sox winning in the 12th inning in Fenway Park, defeating the Cincinnati Reds to force a seventh and deciding game, which Cincinnati won. Game 6 is best remembered for its exciting lead changes, nail-biting turns of events, and a game-winning walk-off home run by Carlton Fisk, resulting in a 7–6 Red Sox victory.

==== 1976: The designated hitter comes to the World Series ====
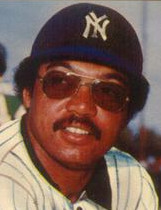
Reggie Jackson earned the nickname "Mr. October" by hitting three consecutive home runs on three consecutive pitches from three different pitchers in the clinching game six of the 1977 World Series

The National and American Leagues operated under essentially identical rules until 1973, when the American League adopted the designated hitter (DH) rule, allowing its teams to use another hitter to bat in place of the (usually) weak-hitting pitcher. The National League did not adopt the DH rule. This presented a problem for the World Series, whose two contestants would now be playing their regular-season games under different rules. From 1973 to 1975, the World Series did not include a DH.

Starting in 1976, the DH rule was used in the World Series held in even-numbered years. The Cincinnati Reds swept the 1976 Series in four games, using the same nine-man lineup in each contest. Dan Driessen was the Reds' DH during the series, thereby becoming the National League's first designated hitter. From 1986 to 2019, and in 2021, the DH was used only in World Series games played at American League parks, and pitchers were required to bat in games played at National League parks. In 2020, and starting in 2022, the DH rule was used in all World Series games, regardless of home team.

=== 1980s ===
==== 1980: Phillies become the last original 16 team to win a World Series ====
The Philadelphia Phillies were the last original 16 team to win a World Series in 1980, defeating the Kansas City Royals in six games. The Game 6 clinching game in Philadelphia remains the most-watched game in World Series history, with a television audience of 54.9 million viewers. This was also the first World Series between teams seeking their first World Series victory since 1920.

==== 1984: Anderson becomes first to win in both leagues ====
The 1984 Detroit Tigers gained distinction as just the third team in major league history (after the 1927 New York Yankees and 1955 Brooklyn Dodgers) to lead a season wire-to-wire, from opening day through their World Series victory. In the process, Tigers skipper Sparky Anderson became the first manager to win a World Series title in both leagues, having previously won in 1975 and 1976 with the Cincinnati Reds.

==== 1985: Umpiring controversy ====
The 1985 Kansas City Royals won the series four games to three over the St. Louis Cardinals. The key turning point of the series was a Kansas City win in Game Six aided by a controversial call by Don Denkinger at first base. Kansas City later won Game Seven 11–0 to take the series.

==== 1986: Mets' Game 6 comeback ====
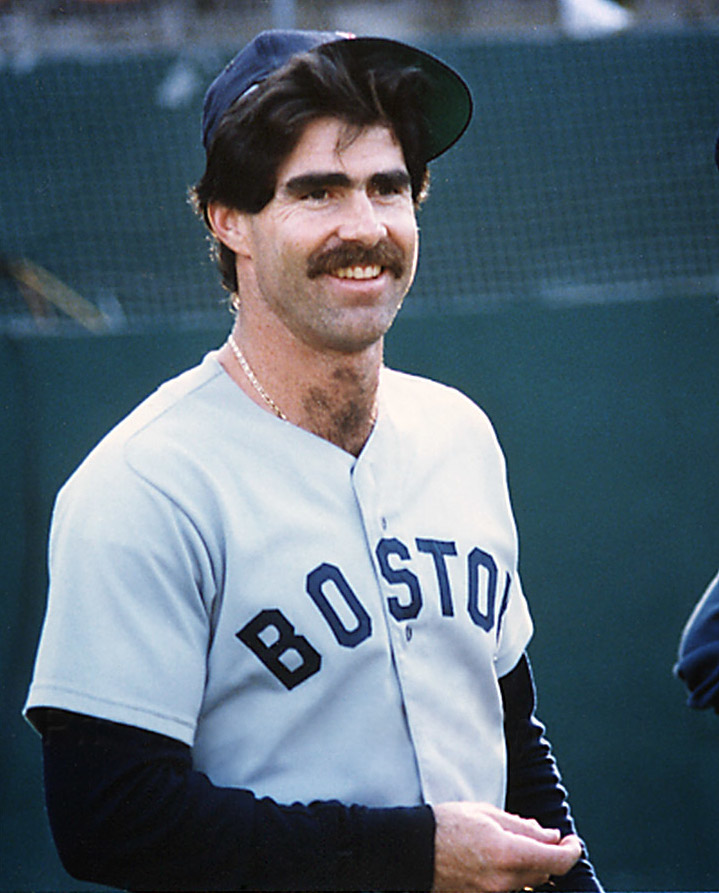
Bill Buckner's error to end Game 6 was one of the most-discussed plays in World Series history and extended the Curse of the Bambino lore.

The series is best remembered for its Game 6, which saw the Mets rally from a two-run deficit in the bottom of the 10th inning, despite having two outs and no one on base. The Red Sox, who held a 3–2 series lead, were twice one strike away from securing the championship, but failed to close out the inning as the Mets tie on a Bob Stanley wild pitch & win off an error by Boston first baseman Bill Buckner. Due to the Mets claiming the series in Game 7, the Game 6 collapse entered baseball lore as part of the Curse of the Bambino superstition used to explain the Red Sox's championship drought after the 1918 World Series.

==== 1987: Twins First World Series champion to win every home game ====
The 1987 Minnesota Twins became the first team in the history of the World Series to win the championship by winning all 4 games they hosted when they defeated the St. Louis Cardinals. They repeated this 4 years later in 1991 when they defeated the Atlanta Braves.

==== 1988: Kirk Gibson's home run ====
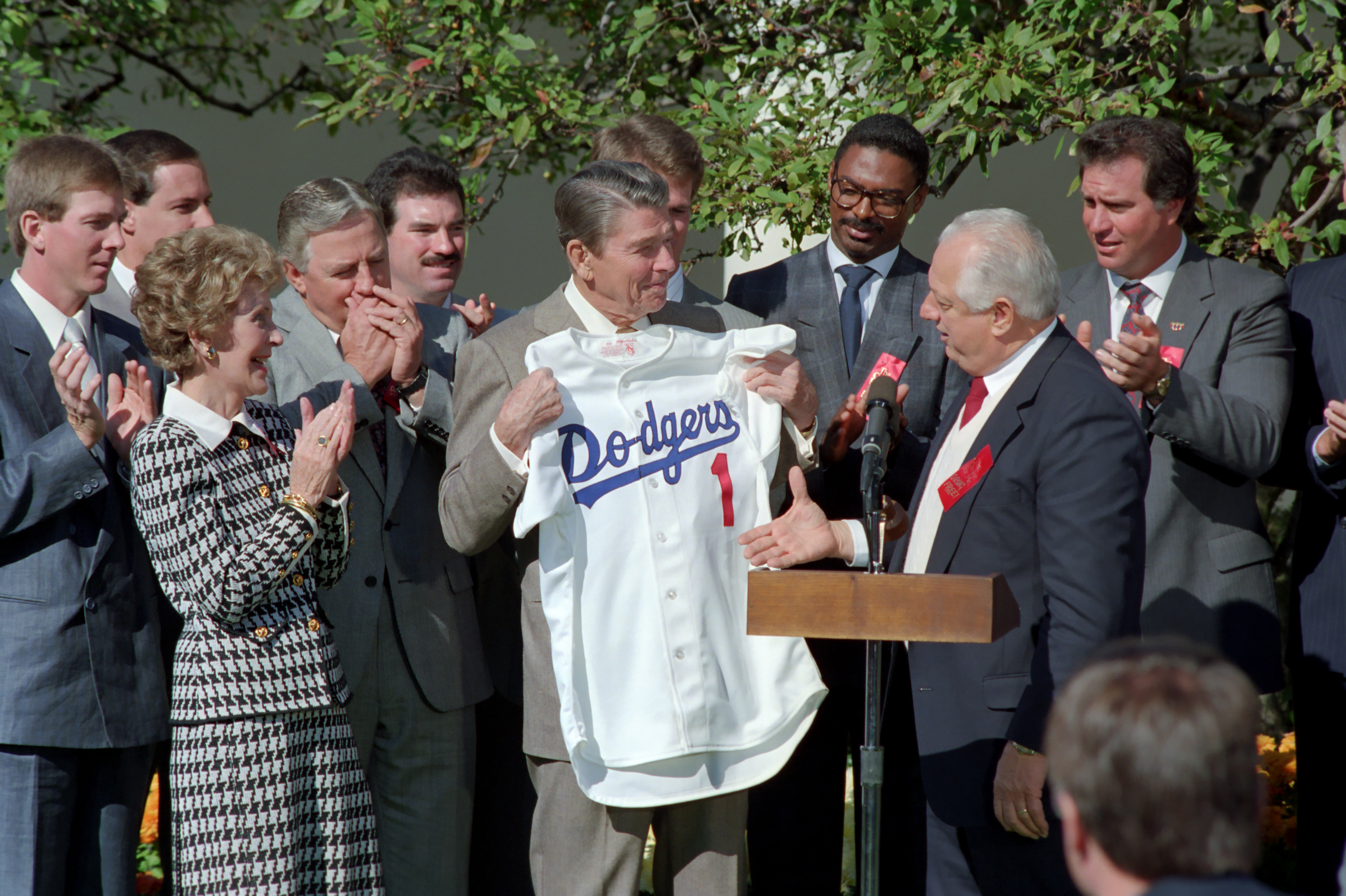
President Ronald Reagan with the 1988 World Series champions: Los Angeles Dodgers

The 1988 World Series is remembered for the iconic home run by the Los Angeles Dodgers' Kirk Gibson with two outs in the bottom of the ninth inning of Game 1. The Dodgers were huge underdogs against the 104-win Oakland Athletics, who had swept the Boston Red Sox in the ALCS. Baseball's top relief pitcher, Dennis Eckersley, closed out all four games in the ALCS, and he appeared ready to do the same in Game 1 against a Dodgers team trailing 4–3 in the ninth.

After getting the first two outs, Eckersley walked Mike Davis of the Dodgers, who were playing without Gibson, their best position player and the NL MVP. Gibson had injured himself in the NLCS and was expected to miss the entire World Series. Yet, despite not being able to walk without a noticeable limp, Gibson surprised all in attendance at Dodger Stadium (and all watching on TV) by pinch-hitting. After two quick strikes and then working the count full, Gibson hit a home run to right, inspiring iconic pronouncements by two legendary broadcasters calling the game, Vin Scully (on TV) and Jack Buck (on radio).

On NBC, after Gibson limped around the bases, Scully famously exclaimed, "The impossible has happened!" and on radio, Buck equally famously exclaimed, "I don't believe what I just saw!" Gibson's home run set the tone for the series, as the Dodgers went on to beat the A's 4 games to 1. The severity of Gibson's injury prevented him from playing in any of the remaining games.

==== 1989: Earthquake ====
When the 1989 World Series began, it was notable chiefly for being the first-ever World Series matchup between the two San Francisco Bay Area teams, the San Francisco Giants and Oakland Athletics. Oakland won the first two games at home, and the two teams crossed the bridge to San Francisco to play Game 3 on Tuesday, October 17. ABC's broadcast of Game 3 began at 5 pm local time, approximately 30 minutes before the first pitch was scheduled. At 5:04, while broadcasters Al Michaels and Tim McCarver were narrating highlights and the teams were warming up, the Loma Prieta earthquake occurred (having a surface-wave magnitude of 7.1 with an epicenter ten miles (16 km) northeast of Santa Cruz, California).

The earthquake caused substantial property and economic damage in the Bay Area and killed 63 people. Television viewers saw the video signal deteriorate and heard Michaels say "I'll tell you what, we're having an earth--" before the feed from Candlestick Park was lost. Fans filing into the stadium saw Candlestick sway visibly during the quake. Television coverage later resumed, using backup generators, with Michaels becoming a news reporter on the unfolding disaster. Approximately 30 minutes after the earthquake, Commissioner Fay Vincent ordered the game to be postponed. Fans, workers, and the teams evacuated a blacked-out (although still sunlit) Candlestick. Game 3 was finally played on October 27, and Oakland won that day and the next to complete a four-game sweep.

=== 1990s ===
==== 1991: "The Greatest of All Time" ====
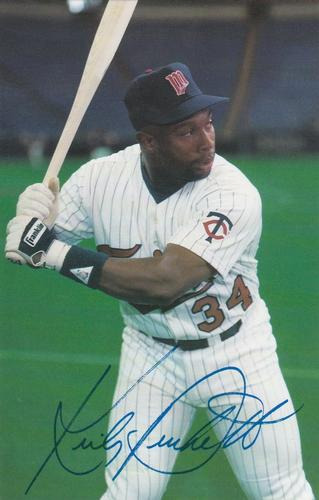
In Game 6 of the 1991 World Series, Kirby Puckett made a memorable leaping catch in left field to rob an extra-base hit. In the bottom of the 11th inning, Puckett hit a game-winning home run to send the Series to Game 7

The 1991 World Series saw the Minnesota Twins defeating the Atlanta Braves four games to three to win the championship. ESPN selected it as the "Greatest of All Time" in their "World Series 100th Anniversary" countdown, with five of its games being decided by a single run, four games decided in the final at-bat and three games going into extra innings. The series was also notable for both participants having finished last in their divisions the year prior; no last place team before had ever finished first, let alone reached the World Series, the following year.

The series-deciding seventh game was a scoreless tie (0–0) through the regular nine innings, and went into extra innings; Minnesota won by a score of 1–0 in the 10th inning, after their starting pitcher, Jack Morris, pitched a complete 10 inning shutout 7th game. (Morris was named Most Valuable Player for the Series.)

==== 1992–1993: The World Series enters Canada ====
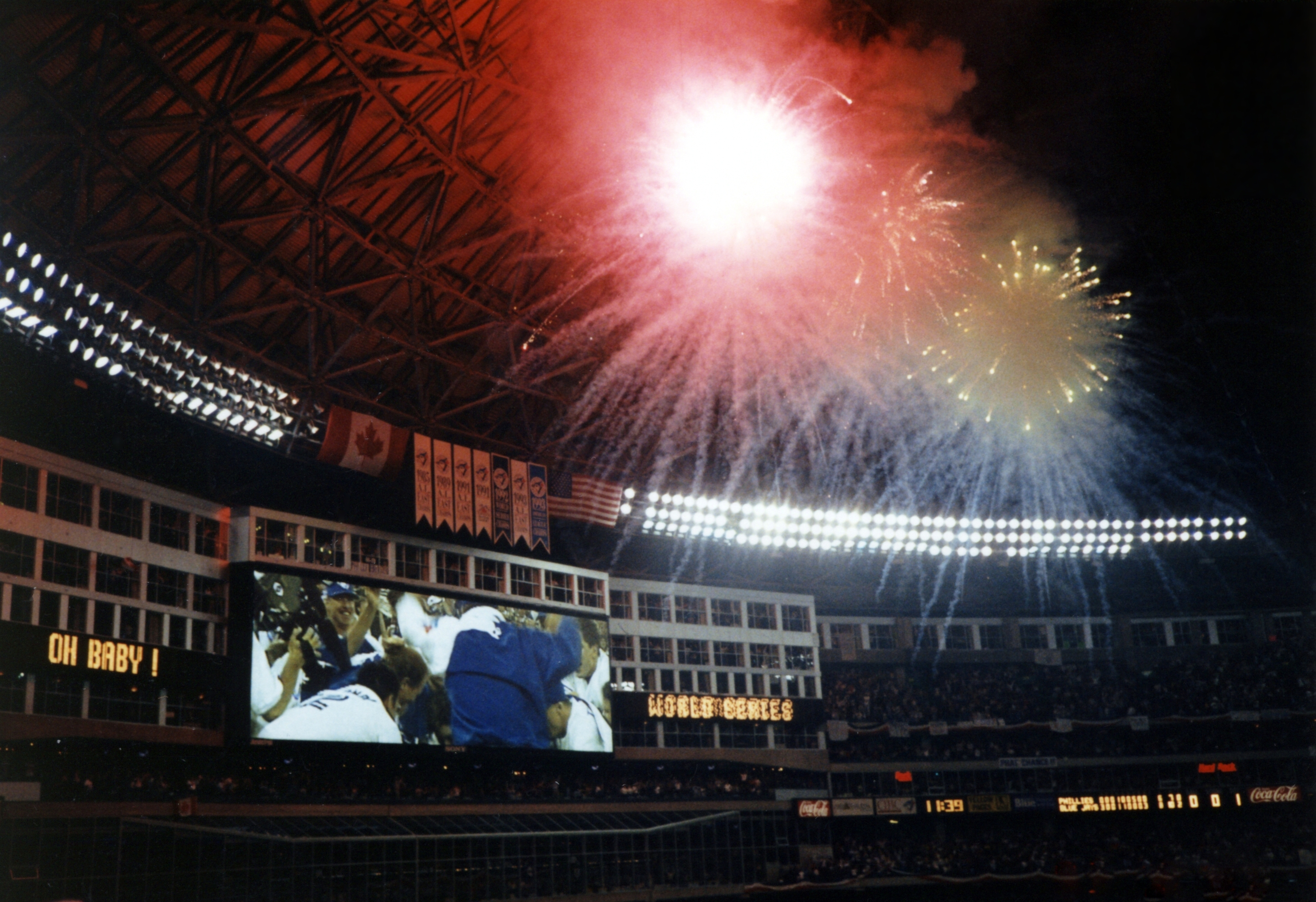
Fireworks in SkyDome after Joe Carter's 1993 World Series-winning home run

World Series games were contested outside of the United States for the first time in 1992, with the Toronto Blue Jays defeating the Atlanta Braves in six games. The World Series returned to Canada in 1993, with the Blue Jays victorious again, this time against the Philadelphia Phillies in six games. No other Series featured a team from outside of the United States until 2025 when the Blue Jays qualified for their third World Series. Toronto is the only expansion team to win successive World Series titles.

The 1993 World Series was also notable for being only the second championship concluded by a walk-off home run and the first concluded by a come-from-behind homer, after Joe Carter's three-run shot in the bottom of the ninth inning sealed an 8–6 Toronto win in Game 6. Blue Jays radio announcer Tom Cheek's exclamation of "Touch 'em all, Joe! You'll never hit a bigger home run in your life!" as Carter rounded the bases remains one of the most famous calls in baseball history. The first Series to end with a homer was the 1960 World Series, when Bill Mazeroski hit a ninth-inning solo shot in Game 7 to win the championship for the Pittsburgh Pirates over the New York Yankees.

==== 1994: League Division Series (the Wild Card era) ====
In 1994, each league was restructured into three divisions, with the three division winners and the newly introduced wild card winner advancing to a best-of-five playoff round (the "division series"), the National League Division Series (NLDS) and American League Division Series (ALDS). The team with the best league record is matched against the wild card team unless they are in the same division, in which case, the team with the second-best record plays against the wild card winner.

The remaining two division winners are pitted against each other. The winners of the series in the first round advance to the best-of-seven NLCS and ALCS. Due to a players' strike, however, the NLDS and ALDS were not played until 1995. Beginning in 1998, home-field advantage was given to the team with the better regular-season record, with the exception that the Wild Card team cannot get home-field advantage.

==== 1994–1995 strike ====
After the boycott of 1904, the World Series was played every year until 1994 despite World War I, the global influenza pandemic of 1918–1919, the Great Depression of the 1930s, America's involvement in World War II, and even an earthquake in the host cities of the 1989 World Series. A breakdown in collective bargaining led to a strike in August 1994 and the eventual cancellation of the rest of the season, including the playoffs.

As the labor talks began, baseball franchise owners demanded a salary cap in order to limit payrolls (while tying revenue-sharing to it), the elimination of salary arbitration, and other various demands, which would have included using replacement players to cross picket lines. The Major League Baseball Players Association (MLBPA) refused to agree to limit payrolls, noting that the responsibility for high payrolls lay with those owners who were voluntarily offering contracts while working with a de facto commissioner in Bud Selig (who was the chairman of the Executive Council for the league), who had replaced Fay Vincent when he was forced out in 1992 (Selig did not become a full-time commissioner until 1998).

The previous collective bargaining agreement expired on December 31, 1993, and baseball began the 1994 season without a new agreement. Owners and players negotiated as the season progressed, but owners refused to give up the idea of a salary cap and players refused to accept one. On August 12, 1994, the players went on strike. After a month passed with no progress in the labor talks, Selig canceled the rest of the 1994 season and the postseason on September 14. The World Series was not played for the first time in 90 years. The Montreal Expos, now the Washington Nationals, were the best team in baseball at the time of the stoppage, with a record of 74–40.

The labor dispute lasted into the spring of 1995, with owners beginning spring training with replacement players. However, the MLBPA returned to work on April 2, 1995, after a federal judge, Sonia Sotomayor, ruled that the owners had engaged in unfair labor practices. The season started on April 25 and the 1995 World Series was played as scheduled, with the Atlanta Braves beating the Cleveland Indians four games to two.

==== 1996–2000: Yankees' dynasty ====
In 1996, the Yankees beat the defending World Series champion Atlanta Braves, four games to two, for the club's 23rd World Series title and its first since 1978, winning four straight games after losing the first two at home, joining the 1985 Royals and 1986 Mets as World Series teams to accomplish this feat. The only year the Yankees did not win a World Series from 1996 through 2000 was in 1997 when the expansion Florida Marlins, playing in just their fifth season, defeated the Cleveland Indians in Game 7 on a Craig Counsell walk-off hit.

The Yankees returned to the World Series in 1998 and 1999, sweeping both series against the Padres and Braves, respectively.

=== 2000s ===
==== Early 2000s: 9/11 and Red Sox end the Curse of the Bambino ====
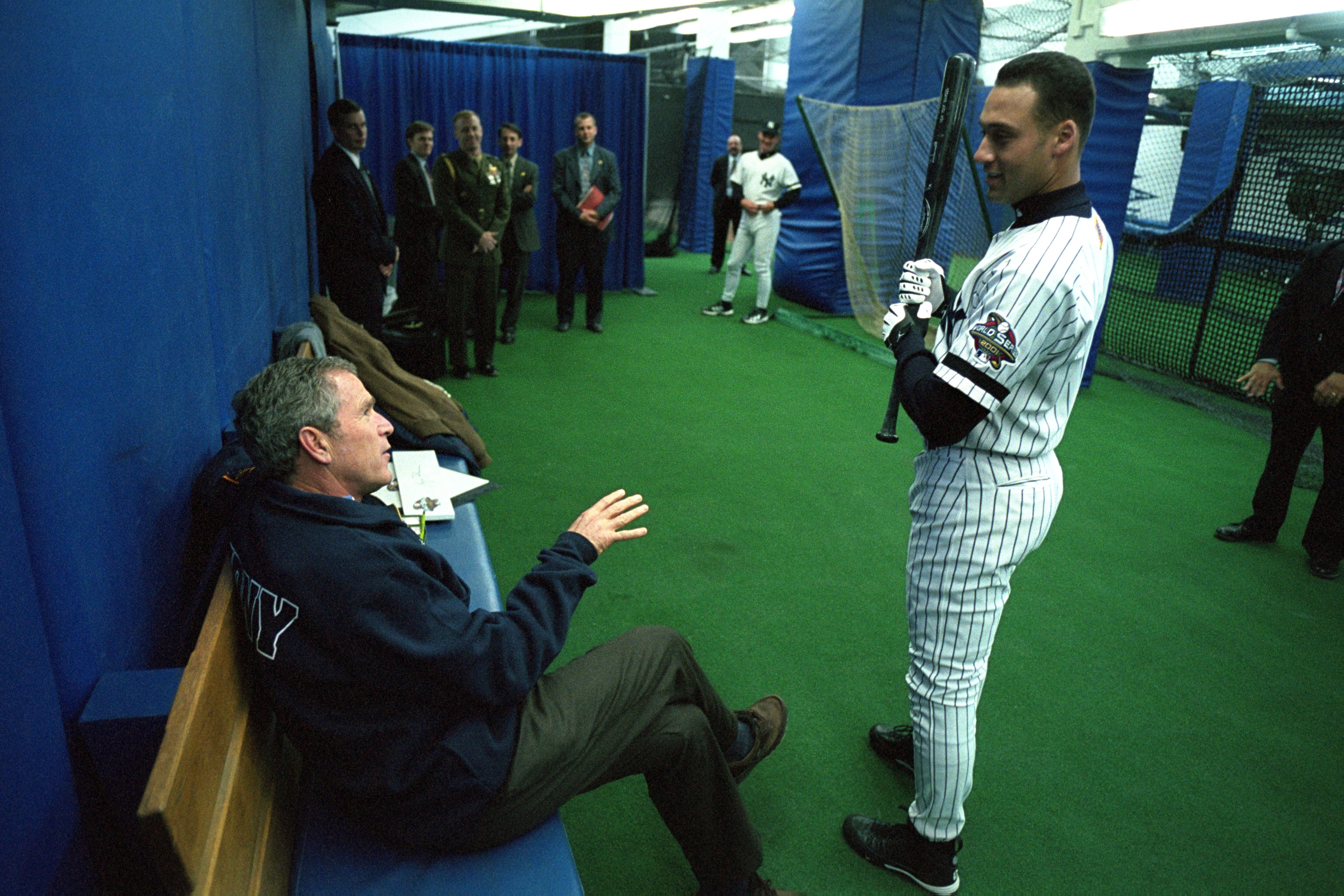
Yankee shortstop Derek Jeter, here pictured with President George W. Bush before game three of the 2001 World Series, became the first player to hit a walk-off home run in November. Overall, there were three walk-offs in this World Series, including Luis Gonzalez Game 7 walk-off bloop single.

The 2000 New York Yankees faced the Mets in the first World Series played entirely in New York since 1956. The Yankees defeated the Mets four games to one to win their 26th World Series Championship. Shortstop Derek Jeter won the World Series' Most Valuable Player award after winning the Most Valuable Player award in the All-Star Game in the same year.

The 2001 World Series was the first World Series to end in November, due to the week-long delay in the regular season after the September 11 attacks. Game 4 had begun on October 31 but went into extra innings and ended early on the morning of November 1, the first time the Series had been played in November. Yankee shortstop Derek Jeter won the game with a 10th inning walk-off home run and was dubbed "Mr. November" by elements of the media echoing the media's designation of Reggie Jackson as "Mr. October" for his slugging achievements during the 1977 World Series. In Game 7, the Yankees led in the ninth inning before the Diamondbacks staged a comeback against closer Mariano Rivera, capped off by a walk-off, bases-loaded bloop single by Luis Gonzalez to clinch Arizona's championship victory. This was the third World Series to end in a bases-loaded, walk-off hit, following 1991 and 1997, and to this date, the last Series to end on a walk-off of any kind. It has since been considered one of the greatest World Series of all time.

Red Sox celebrate their curse-ending 2004 World Series on opening day 2005.

The Boston Red Sox broke their 86-year drought, known as the Curse of the Bambino, defeating the Yankees in the 2004 ALCS after losing the first three games, and then sweeping the St. Louis Cardinals in the 2004 World Series. The Chicago White Sox broke their 88-year drought, known as the Curse of the Black Sox, with their sweep of the Houston Astros in the 2005 World Series. The White Sox dominated the 2005 Major League Baseball postseason going 11–1, tied with the 1999 New York Yankees playoff run. In the ALCS, the White Sox starting rotation threw 4 straight complete games against the Los Angeles Angels, which is the only time this has been accomplished in ALCS history. With the 2006 World Series victory by the Cardinals, Tony La Russa became the second manager to win a World Series in both the American and National Leagues. Other notable World Series victories of the decade include the Anaheim Angels in 2002, their first ever, and the Philadelphia Phillies in 2008.

==== All-Star Game and home-field advantage (2003–2016) ====
Prior to 2003, home-field advantage in the World Series alternated from year to year between the NL and AL. After the 2002 Major League Baseball All-Star Game ended in a tie, MLB decided to award home-field advantage in the World Series to the winner of the All-Star Game. Originally implemented as a two-year trial from 2003 to 2004, the practice was extended.

The American League had won every All-Star Game since this change until 2010 and thus enjoyed home-field advantage from 2002, when it also had home-field advantage based on the alternating schedule, through 2009. From 2003 to 2010, the AL and NL had each won the World Series four times, but none of them had gone the full seven games. Since then, the 2011, 2014, 2016, 2017, 2019, and 2025 World Series have gone the full seven games.

This rule was subject to debate, with various writers feeling that home-field advantage should be decided based on the regular season records of the participants, not on an exhibition game played several months earlier. Some writers especially questioned the integrity of this rule after the 2014 All-Star Game, when St. Louis Cardinals pitcher Adam Wainwright suggested that he intentionally gave Derek Jeter some easy pitches to hit in the New York Yankees' shortstop's final All-Star appearance before he retired at the end of that season.

As Bob Ryan of The Boston Globe wrote in July 2015 about the rule:

So now we have a game that's not real baseball determining which league hosts Games 1, 2, 6, and 7 in the World Series. It's not a game if pitchers throw one inning. It's not a game if managers try to get everyone on a bloated roster into the game. It's not a game if every franchise, no matter how wretched, has to put a player on the team ... If the game is going to count, tell the managers to channel their inner Connie Mack and go for it.

However, in ten of the past twelve seasons, home-field advantage has not decided World Series games: Between 2014 and 2021, and again since 2023, the home team did not win the deciding game of a World Series on their own home field, although the 2020 edition, played on a neutral site due to the COVID-19 pandemic, was won by the designated home team (in this case the team that batted second), the Los Angeles Dodgers, so technically speaking it was the first Series won by the home team since 2013. The 2022 edition was won in 6 games by the eventual designated home team, the Houston Astros, making them the first such team since 2013 to actually win the deciding game of a World Series on their own home field, in this case Minute Maid Park. The following year, the Texas Rangers won the 2023 Series on the road, at Chase Field, home of the opponents, the Arizona Diamondbacks, who would have home-field advantage for the deciding game of the 2023 Series. The following year the Los Angeles Dodgers won the 2024 Series on the road in Yankee Stadium, home of opponents the New York Yankees, who had home-field advantage for the deciding game of their 2024 series. And in 2025, the Dodgers repeated as World Series champions with a come-from-behind 11-inning Game 7 victory over the Toronto Blue Jays on the road at Rogers Centre.

=== 2010s: Second wild card era ===
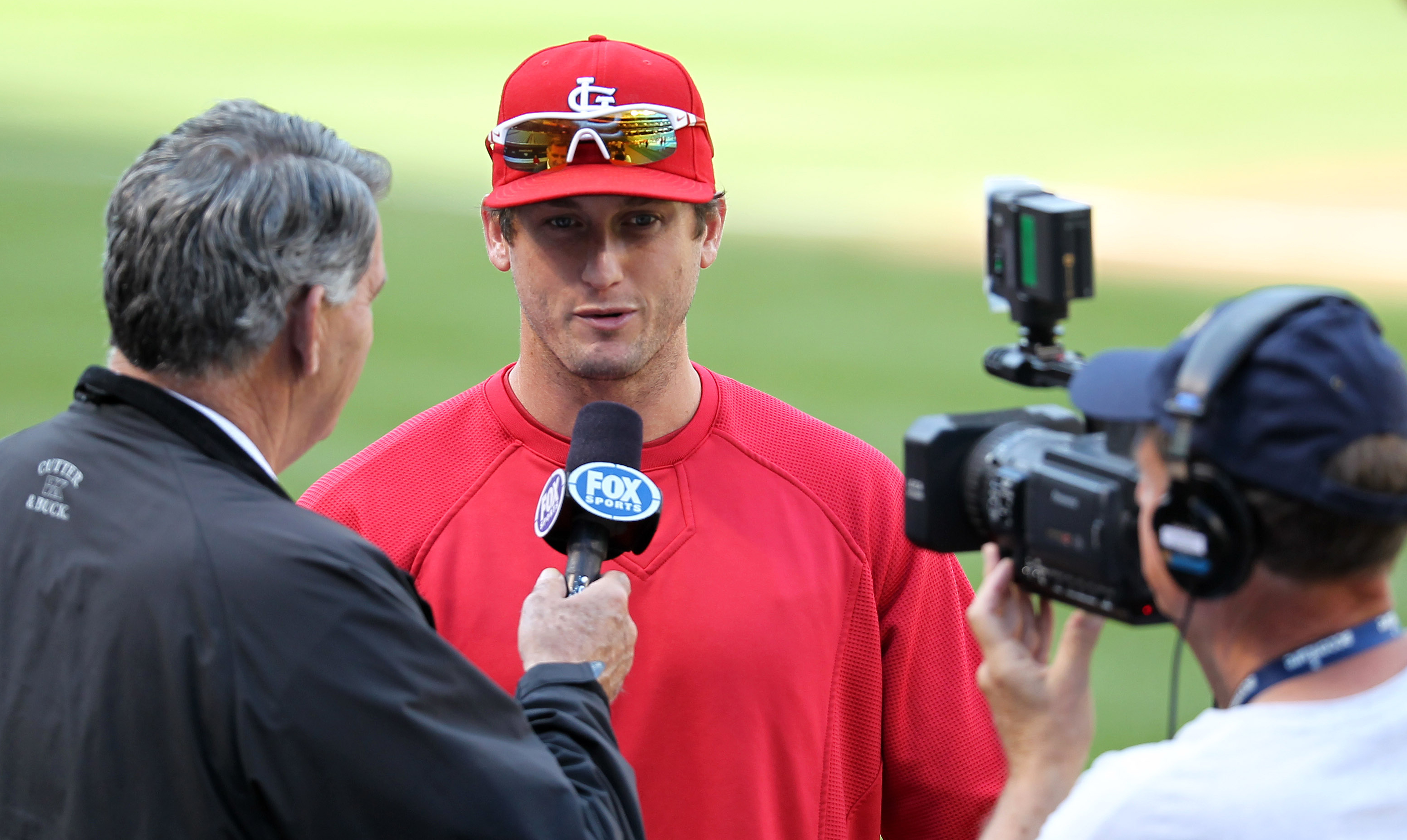
In 2011, David Freese hit a game-tying two-run triple (with two outs) to send it into extra innings. In the bottom of the 11th, Freese led off with a game-winning home run to send the Series to Game 7

==== 2010–2014: Giants' even-year dynasty ====
Between 2010 and 2014, the San Francisco Giants won the World Series every other year during even-numbered years (2010, 2012 and 2014) while failing to qualify to play in the postseason in the intervening seasons during odd-numbered. In 2010, the Giants defeated the Rangers in five games to capture their first title since 1954 and their first since relocating to San Francisco from New York City in 1958, ending the Curse of Coogan's Bluff.

In 2011, the Rangers were twice only one strike away from winning their first World Series title, but the St. Louis Cardinals' David Freese, the eventual Series MVP, drove in both the tying and winning runs late in game six to force a game seven. The Cardinals won the final game, 6-2, clinching their 11th World Series championship.

In 2012, the Wild Card game was added. This game, one from each league, was played between the two best non-division winning teams in each league. The San Francisco Giants swept the Detroit Tigers in that year's World Series.

In 2013, the Boston Red Sox won their first World Series of the 2010s by defeating the St. Louis Cardinals in six games. They won the final game at Fenway Park, clinching the championship at home for the first time since 1918.

In 2014, the Kansas City Royals reached the World Series in their first appearance in the postseason since winning the series in 1985, breaking the longest postseason drought in baseball. There, they met the San Francisco Giants, who defeated them in seven games to capture their third title in five years. Giants pitcher Madison Bumgarner threw a complete game shutout in Game 5 and recorded a five-inning scoreless innings off two days' rest to earn the save in Game 7 to win Series MVP, setting a new World Series record for lowest career ERA with 0.25 (minimum 25 innings pitched) and postseason record of 52 2/3 innings pitched.

The following season, the Royals finished with the American League's best record and won a second consecutive American League pennant. They defeated the New York Mets in the World Series in five games, capturing their first title in 30 years. The 2015 contest was the first time that two expansion clubs met in the series.

==== Late 2010s: Cubs end their 108-year title drought and Astros' sign-stealing scandal ====
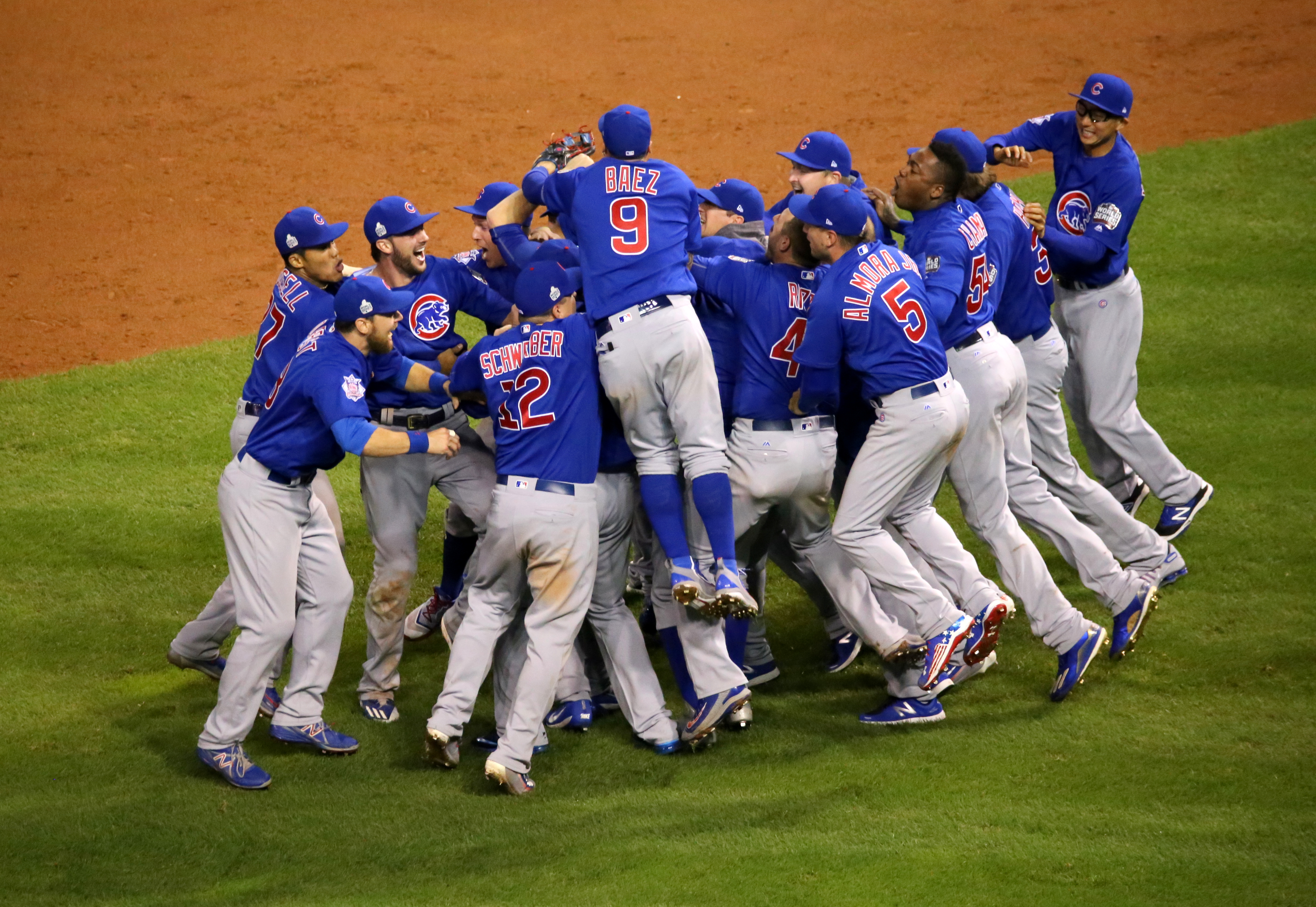
Chicago Cubs celebrate their 2016 World Series victory, their first in 108 years

In 2016, the Chicago Cubs ended their 108-year long drought without a World Series title by defeating the Cleveland Indians in seven games, rallying from a 3–1 Series deficit in the process. That extended Cleveland's World Series title drought to 68 years and counting – the Indians last won the Series in 1948 – now the longest title drought in the major leagues. At the series' conclusion, numerous outlets listed Game 7 as an instant classic, and the entire Series as one of the greatest of all time.

Beginning in 2017, home-field advantage in the World Series was awarded to the league champion team with the better regular-season win–loss record. If both league champions have the same record, the tie-breaker is a head-to-head record, and if that does not resolve it, the second tie-breaker is the best divisional record. This change became the last championship series in the three major North American professional sports leagues to be awarded home advantage from the teams with the better regular season record since the NBA Finals in basketball and the Stanley Cup Final in ice hockey.

MLB commissioner Rob Manfred penalized the 2017 Astros for their role in the sign-stealing scandal. However, he did not strip them on the World Series title.

The Houston Astros won the 2017 World Series in seven games in L.A. against the Los Angeles Dodgers on November 1, 2017, winning their first World Series since their creation in 1962 and since transferring to the American League in 2013. The Astros' title came under controversy in the aftermath of their sign stealing scandal, which implicated the team engaged in an elaborate scheme involving the use of technology to illegally steal the pitching signs of opposing teams during the 2017 and 2018 seasons. MLB commissioner Rob Manfred ultimately suspended recently retired player Carlos Beltran, bench coach Alex Cora, manager A. J. Hinch, and general manager Jeff Luhnow for a full season, and fined the team $5 million, the maximum allowable under the CBA. The Astros were also forced to forfeiture of their first and second round picks in 2020 and 2021.

The Boston Red Sox won the 2018 World Series, defeating the Los Angeles Dodgers in five games for their fourth title since 2004. Game three of the series, the only game Boston lost, was an 18-inning game, which was the longest in World Series history.

In 2019, the Washington Nationals defeated the Houston Astros in seven games, becoming the first team to win the World Series without winning a home game and the first Washington, DC team to win the series since the 1924 Washington Senators. It was the first seven-game World Series in which the road team won every game.

With the Nationals' appearance in the World Series in 2019, the Seattle Mariners are left as the only active MLB franchise to never appear in the World Series.

=== 2020s: Third wildcard era ===
==== Dodgers' dynasty ====
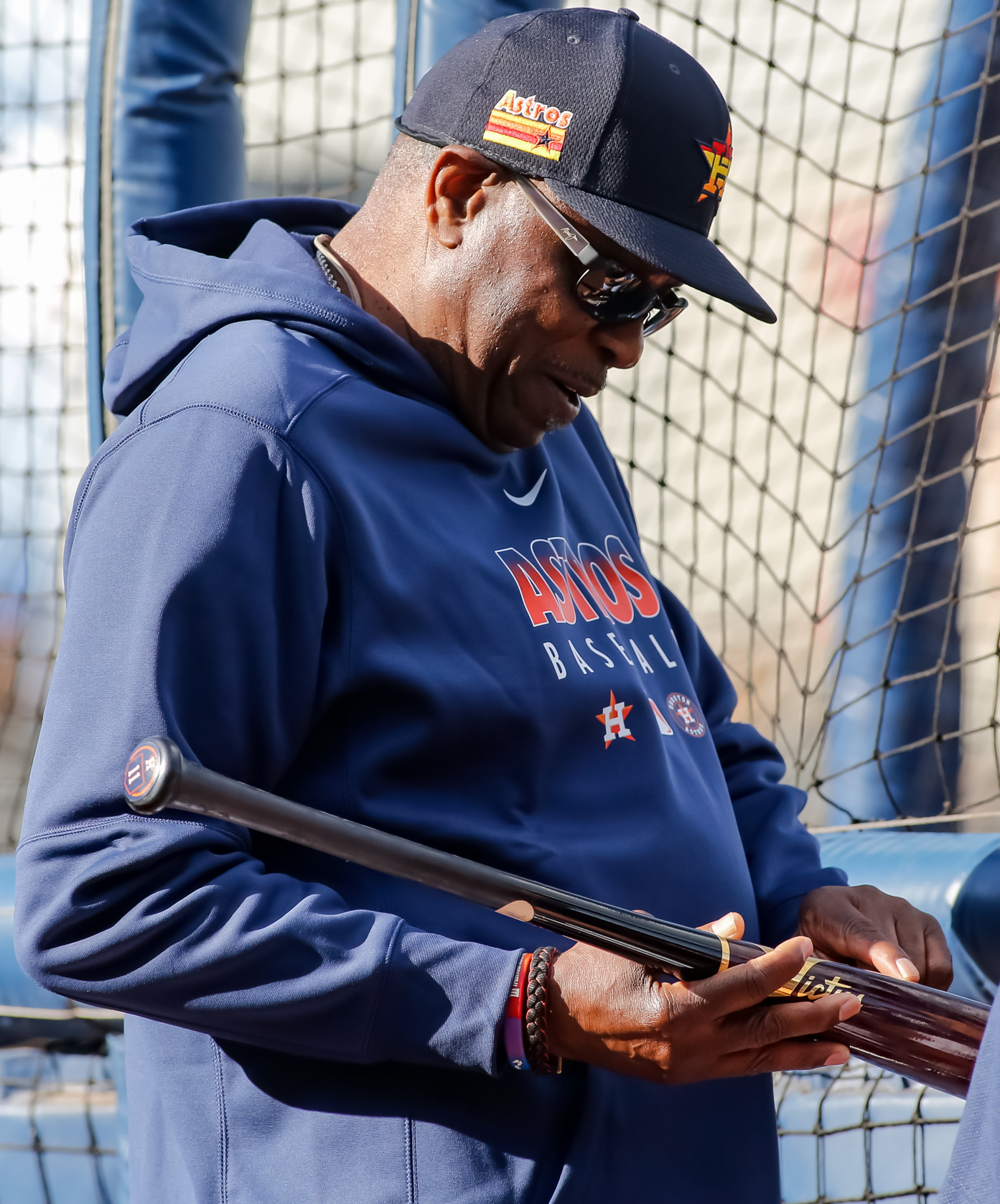
Manager Dusty Baker of the Houston Astros, became the oldest manager to win a World Series in 2022.

In 2020, the Los Angeles Dodgers defeated the Tampa Bay Rays in six games to win their first World Series since 1988, and their seventh championship in franchise history, during a season that was shortened to 60 games by the COVID-19 pandemic. Starting with the Division Series, all postseason games were played at neutral venues, with the World Series being held at Globe Life Field, the home stadium of the Texas Rangers. For the 2020 season, MLB also temporarily added two extra wild card teams to each league, expanding the format for the first time since 2012.

The Houston Astros went to back-to-back World Series in 2021 and 2022. In 2021, they lost to the Atlanta Braves in six games, with Jorge Soler winning MVP Honors. This would be the last year of the wild card game format. The next season, MLB added a third wild card postseason team and went to two best-of-three-game series, in what now was called the Wild Card Series. In these two games, it pitted the worst-division winning team in the league against the third wild card team and the two best non-division winning teams against each other. In 2022, the Astros defeated the Philadelphia Phillies (the third place wild card team in the first year of the format) in six games, where rookie Jeremy Peña was awarded MVP, Houston manager Dusty Baker won his first World Series in his 25 years of being a manager and also became the oldest manager to win a World Series game. Four pitchers pitched a combined no-hitter in Game 4, the first no-hitter thrown in the World Series since Don Larsen's perfect game in 1956 and only the second ever in the history of the World Series.

In 2023, two teams returned: the Texas Rangers after twelve years and the Arizona Diamondbacks after twenty-two years. The Rangers, who had home-field advantage for the opening two games, went on to defeat the Diamondbacks in five games to achieve their first World Series championship in franchise history. Corey Seager won the MVP Honor for the second time (his first was with the Los Angeles Dodgers in 2020), sharing with Reggie Jackson to win MVP Honors with two different teams. The 2023 World Series was the only World Series to not feature the Astros or Dodgers from 2017 to 2025.

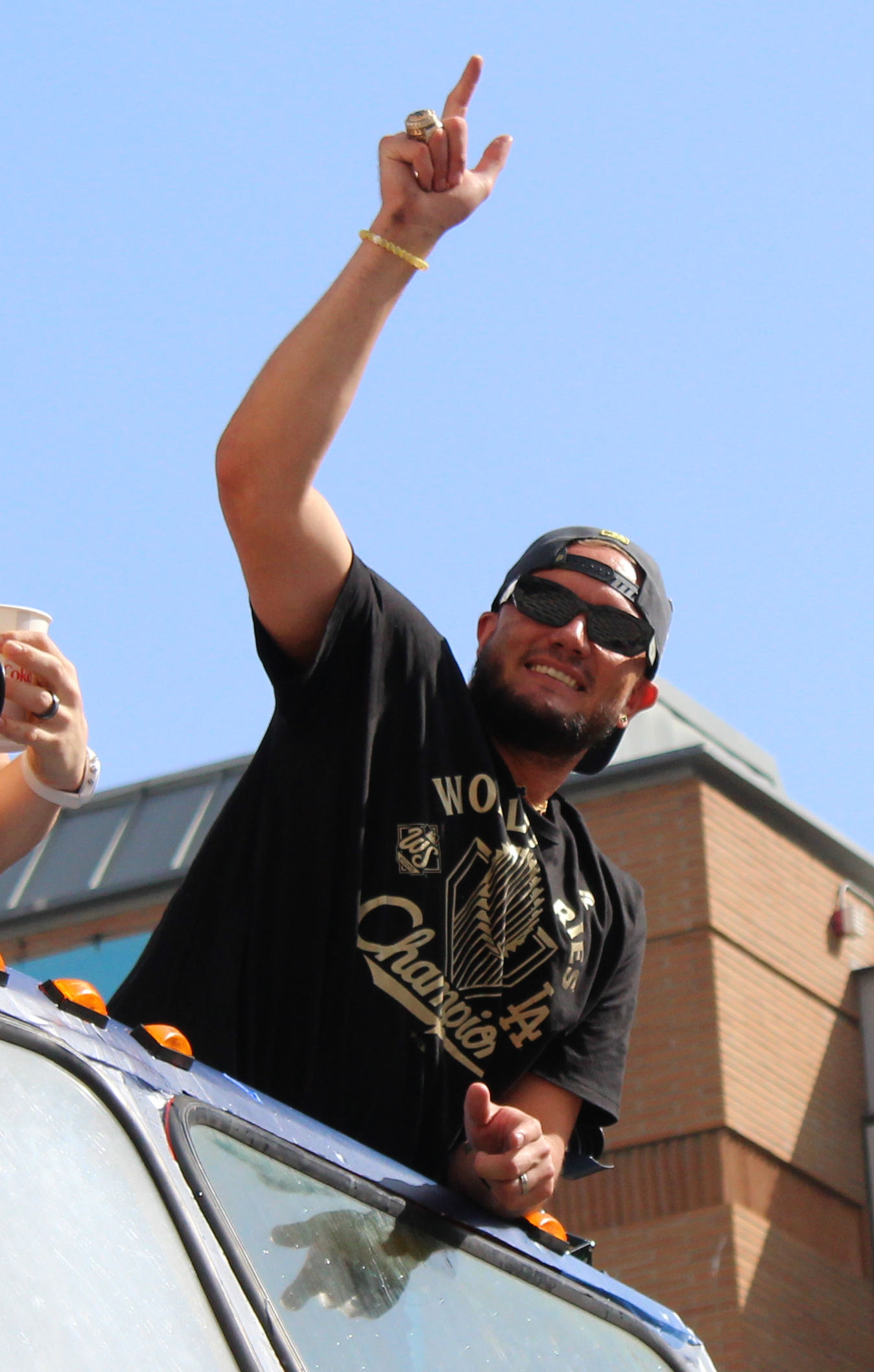
In the top of the 9th inning in Game 7 of the 2025 World Series, light-hitting infield Miguel Rojas tied the game, hitting one of the most unexpected and dramatic home runs in MLB history.

In 2024, the New York Yankees returned for the first time since their 2009 championship, meeting the Los Angeles Dodgers in a matchup that had not happened since 1981. The Dodgers, with home field advantage, took the first 2 games at Dodger Stadium, and the first game at Yankee Stadium to take a 3–0 lead. The Yankees won Game 4, and then held a 5–0 lead in Game 5, but lost 7–6, giving the Dodgers their second title in five years and first since 2020. Freddie Freeman was awarded the World Series MVP trophy after hitting home runs in each of the first four games, including a walk-off grand slam in Game 1.

In 2025, the Fall Classic was a close contest for both Los Angeles and Toronto as each club matched the other's dominant performances. Toronto won Game 1 with a high-scoring 11–4 victory while the Dodgers won Game 2 with several late runs. The Dodgers won Game 3 in 18 innings, capped off by another Freddie Freeman's walk-off home run (he was the first played in MLB history to hit two walk-off World Series home runs). Toronto took advantage of the Dodgers’ struggling bullpen in Games 4 and 5, with the Blue Jays assuming a 3–2 series lead. However, the Dodgers prevailed in a memorable Game 6 after they thwarted a Blue Jays' ninth inning rally, to send the series into a winner-take-all Game 7. Toronto held control for a majority of the final game, but Dodgers Miguel Rojas hit a dramatic game-tying home-run off of closer Jeff Hoffman, and they kept the Jays from scoring in the ninth. In the 11th, Will Smith hit a go-ahead home run for the Dodgers, then Yoshinobu Yamamoto (pitching on zero day's rest after starting Game 6) withstood a late Blue Jays rally to end the game and the series, 4–3 in favor of Los Angeles. The 2025 World Series has been cited as among the greatest World Series of all time.

2026 pitted the Milwaukee Brewers against the Tampa Bay Rays, featuring the first World Series between teams seeking their first championship since 1980. The Brewers won the series in five games, earning their aforementioned first World Series win, and the city of Milwaukee's first since 1957, by the Milwaukee Braves.

== Modern World Series appearances by franchise ==
=== World Series record by team or franchise, 1903–present ===
Teams †	Series Wins	Series Played	Last Won	Last Played
New York Yankees (AL) [previously Highlanders]	27	41	2009	2024
St. Louis Cardinals (NL)	11	19	2011	2013
Los Angeles Dodgers (NL) [previously Brooklyn Bridegrooms, Superbas, Trolley Dodgers, Robins, Dodgers]	9	23	2025	2025
Athletics (AL) [previously Philadelphia/Kansas City/Oakland Athletics]	9	14	1989	1990
Boston Red Sox (AL) [previously Americans]	9	13	2018	2018
San Francisco Giants (NL) [previously New York Gothams, Giants]	8	20	2014	2014
Cincinnati Reds (NL) [previously Red Stockings, Redlegs]	5	9	1990	1990
Pittsburgh Pirates (NL) [previously Alleghenys]	5	7	1979	1979
Detroit Tigers (AL)	4	11	1984	2012
Atlanta Braves (NL) [previously Boston Red Stockings, Beaneaters, Doves, Rustlers, Bees, Braves and Milwaukee Braves]	4	10	2021	2021
Chicago Cubs (NL) [previously White Stockings, Colts, Orphans]	3	11	2016	2016
Baltimore Orioles (AL) [previously 1st Milwaukee Brewers and St. Louis Browns]	3	7	1983	1983
Minnesota Twins (AL) [previously 1st Washington Nationals, Senators]	3	6	1991	1991
Chicago White Sox (AL)	3	5	2005	2005
Philadelphia Phillies (NL)	2	8	2008	2022
Cleveland Guardians (AL) [previously Bluebirds, Bronchos, Naps, Indians]	2	6	1948	2016
Houston Astros (NL, 1962; AL, 2013) * [previously Colt .45s, NL]	2	5	2022	2022
New York Mets (NL, 1962) *	2	5	1986	2015
Kansas City Royals (AL, 1969) *	2	4	2015	2015
Toronto Blue Jays (AL, 1977) *	2	3	1993	2025
Miami Marlins (NL, 1993) * [previously Florida Marlins]	2	2	2003	2003
Texas Rangers (AL, 1961) * [previously 2nd Washington Senators]	1	3	2023	2023
Arizona Diamondbacks (NL, 1998) *	1	2	2001	2023
Milwaukee Brewers (AL, 1969; NL, 1998) * [previously Seattle Pilots (AL), currently 2nd Milwaukee Brewers]	1	2	2026	2026
Washington Nationals (NL, 1969) * [previously Montreal Expos, currently 2nd Washington Nationals]	1	1	2019	2019
Los Angeles Angels (AL, 1961) * [previously California/Anaheim Angels and Los Angeles Angels of Anaheim]	1	1	2002	2002
Tampa Bay Rays (AL, 1998) * [previously Devil Rays]	0	3	—	2026
San Diego Padres (NL, 1969) *	0	2	—	1998
Colorado Rockies (NL, 1993) *	0	1	—	2007
Seattle Mariners (AL, 1977)*	0	0	—	—

Key to table
AL = American League
NL = National League
AL* = Joined the American League after 1960
NL* = Joined the National League after 1960
moved between Leagues
† Totals include a team's record
with another nickname or in a previous city
[bracketed below its current name].
For further details, see individual team articles or Major League franchises.
See also: List of World Series champions
Source: MLB.com

Notes

American League (AL) teams have won 68 of the 120 World Series played (56.7%). The New York Yankees have won the World Series the most times with 27 championships, accounting for 22.5% of all series played and 39.7% of the wins by American League teams. The Yankees have also been the American League's representative in the World Series the most times, with 41 total appearances. The St. Louis Cardinals have won 11 World Series, second-most among all 30 teams and most among National League franchises, accounting for 9.2% of all series played and 21.2% of the 52 National League victories. However, the Brooklyn/Los Angeles Dodgers have been the National League's representative in the World Series the most times, with 22 total appearances. After the Dodgers defeated the Yankees in the 2024 World Series, the Dodgers and the Yankees tied for the most losses by any team, with 14 World Series losses each; The Dodgers have the most losses in the National League, while the Yankees' 14 losses are the most among American League teams.

The Yankees and the Dodgers have faced off against each other the most times, with twelve total contests between the two franchises. The Yankees won eight of those twelve contests, although the Dodgers defeated the Yankees in their last two World Series match-ups in 1981 and 2024.

When the first modern World Series was played in 1903, there were eight teams in each league. These 16 franchises, all of which are still in existence, have each won at least two World Series titles.

The number of teams was unchanged until 1961, with fourteen expansion teams joining MLB since then, all of which except the Seattle Mariners have appeared in at least one World Series. Of the 28 Series in which at least one expansion team has played, including three Series (2015, 2019, and 2023) in which both teams were expansion teams, expansion teams have won 13 of them, which is 46.4% of all series in which an expansion team played and 10.9% of all 119 series played since 1903. In 2015, the first World Series featuring only expansion teams was played between the Kansas City Royals and New York Mets.

== Television coverage and ratings ==
When the World Series was first broadcast on television in 1947, it was only televised to a few surrounding areas via coaxial inter-connected stations: New York City (WNBT); Philadelphia (WPTZ); Schenectady/Albany, New York (WRGB); Washington, D.C. (WNBW) and surrounding suburbs/environs. In 1948, games in Boston were only seen in the Northeast. Meanwhile, games in Cleveland were only seen in the Midwest and Pittsburgh. The games were open to all channels with a network affiliation.

In all, the 1948 World Series was televised to fans in seven Midwestern cities: Cleveland, Chicago, Detroit, Milwaukee, St. Louis, and Toledo. By 1949, World Series games could be seen east of the Mississippi River. The games were open to all channels with a network affiliation.

By 1950, World Series games could be seen in most of the country, but not all. 1951 marked the first time that the World Series was televised coast to coast. 1955 marked the first time that the World Series was televised in color.

Network	Number broadcast	Years broadcast	Future scheduled telecasts
ABC	11	1948, 1949, 1950, 1977, 1979, 1981, 1983, 1985, 1987, 1989, 1995 (Games 1, 4–5)	
CBS	8	1947 (Games 3–4), 1948, 1949, 1950, 1990, 1991, 1992, 1993	
DuMont	3	1947 (Games 2, 6–7), 1948, 1949	
Fox	29	1996, 1998, 2000, 2001, 2002, 2003, 2004, 2005, 2006, 2007, 2008, 2009, 2010, 2011, 2012, 2013, 2014, 2015, 2016, 2017, 2018, 2019, 2020, 2021, 2022, 2023, 2024, 2025, 2026	2027, 2028
NBC	39	1947 (Games 1, 5), 1948, 1949, 1950, 1951, 1952, 1953, 1954, 1955, 1956, 1957, 1958, 1959, 1960, 1961, 1962, 1963, 1964, 1965, 1966, 1967, 1968, 1969, 1970, 1971, 1972, 1973, 1974, 1975, 1976, 1978, 1980, 1982, 1984, 1986, 1988, 1995 (Games 2–3, 6), 1997, 1999	

*: Not currently broadcasting Major League Baseball.

**: Per the current broadcast agreement, the World Series will be televised by Fox through 2028.

***: Gillette, which sponsored World Series telecasts exclusively from roughly 1947 to 1965 (prior to 1966, the Series announcers were chosen by the Gillette Company along with the Commissioner of Baseball and NBC), paid for airtime on DuMont's owned-and-operated Pittsburgh affiliate, WDTV (now KDKA-TV) to air the World Series. In the meantime, Gillette also bought airtime on ABC, CBS, and NBC. More to the point, in some cities, the World Series was broadcast on three stations at once.

****: World Series telecasts from 1948 to 1950 were open to all channels with a network affiliation.

*****: NBC was originally scheduled to televise the entire 1995 World Series; however, due to the cancellation of the 1994 Series (which had been slated for ABC, who last televised a World Series in 1989), coverage ended up being split between the two networks. Game 5 would be the last Major League Baseball game to be telecast by ABC (had there been a Game 7, ABC would've televised it) until the 2020 American League Wild Card Series game between Houston and Minnesota. This was the only World Series to be produced under the "Baseball Network" umbrella (a revenue sharing joint venture between Major League Baseball, ABC, and NBC). In July 1995, both networks announced that they would be pulling out of what was supposed to be a six-year-long venture. NBC would next cover the 1997 (NBC's first entirely since 1988) and 1999 World Series over the course of a five-year-long contract, in which Fox would cover the World Series in even-numbered years (1996, 1998, and 2000).

== Sponsorship ==
The Internet television service YouTube TV became the first presenting sponsor of the World Series, signing a partnership deal that ran from 2017 to 2019.

In 2022, credit card provider Capital One signed a multi-year agreement to become the new presenting sponsor of the World Series.

== Image gallery ==
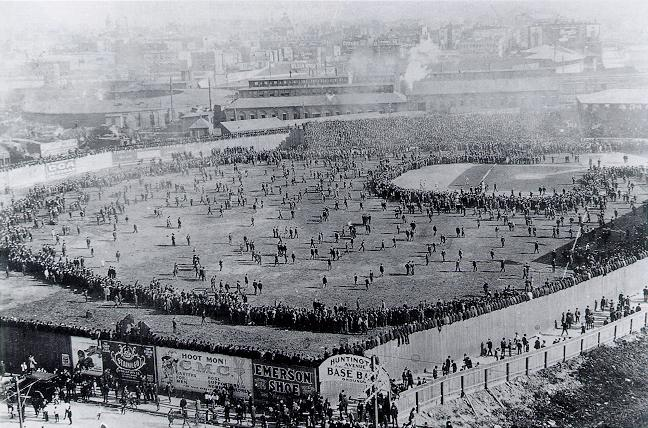
Rooftop view of a 1903 World Series game in Boston

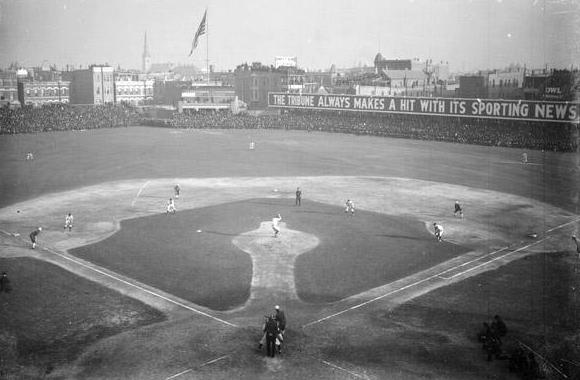
Game action in the 1906 Series in Chicago (the only all-Chicago World Series to date)

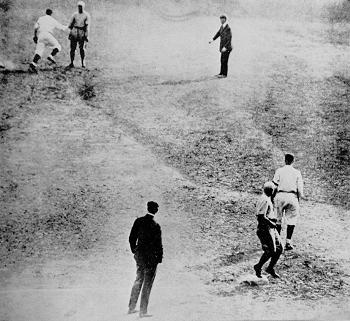
Bill Wambsganss completes his unassisted triple play in 1920

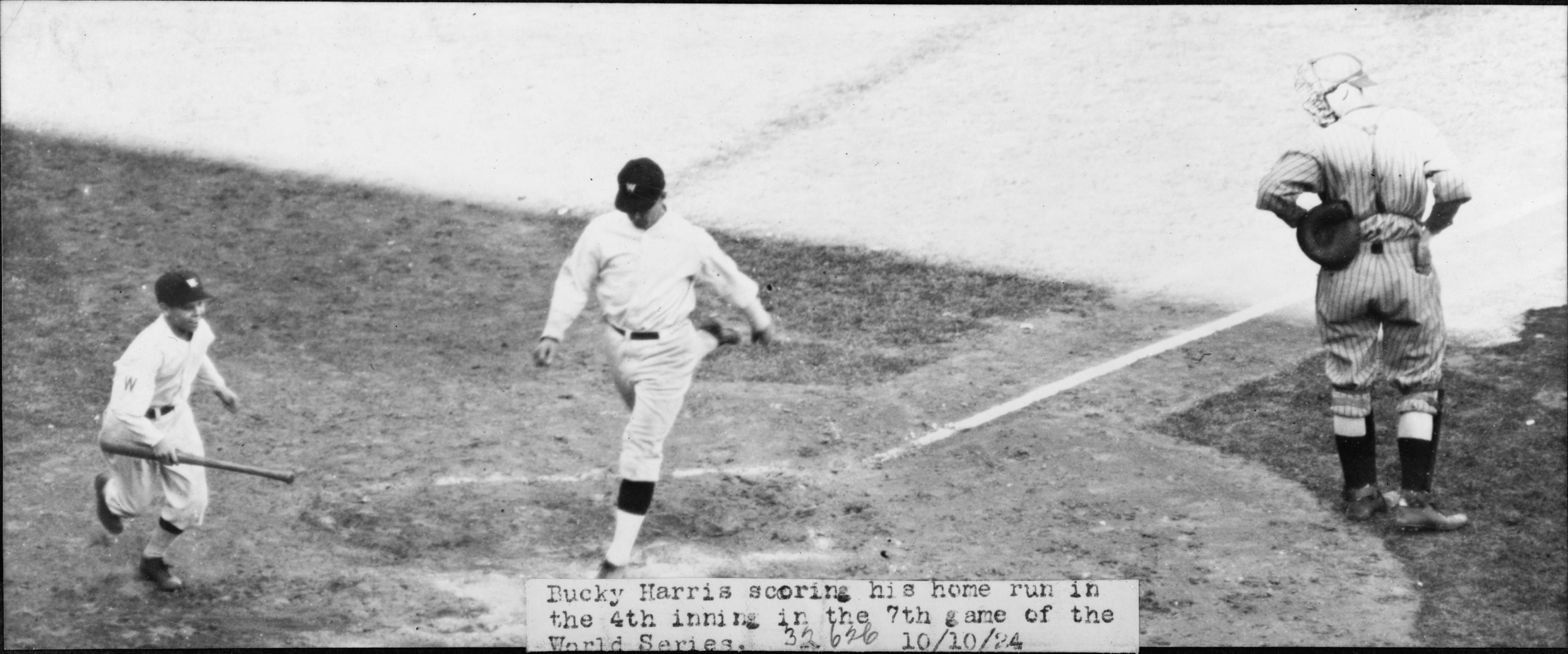
Washington's Bucky Harris scores his home run in the fourth inning of Game 7 (October 10, 1924)

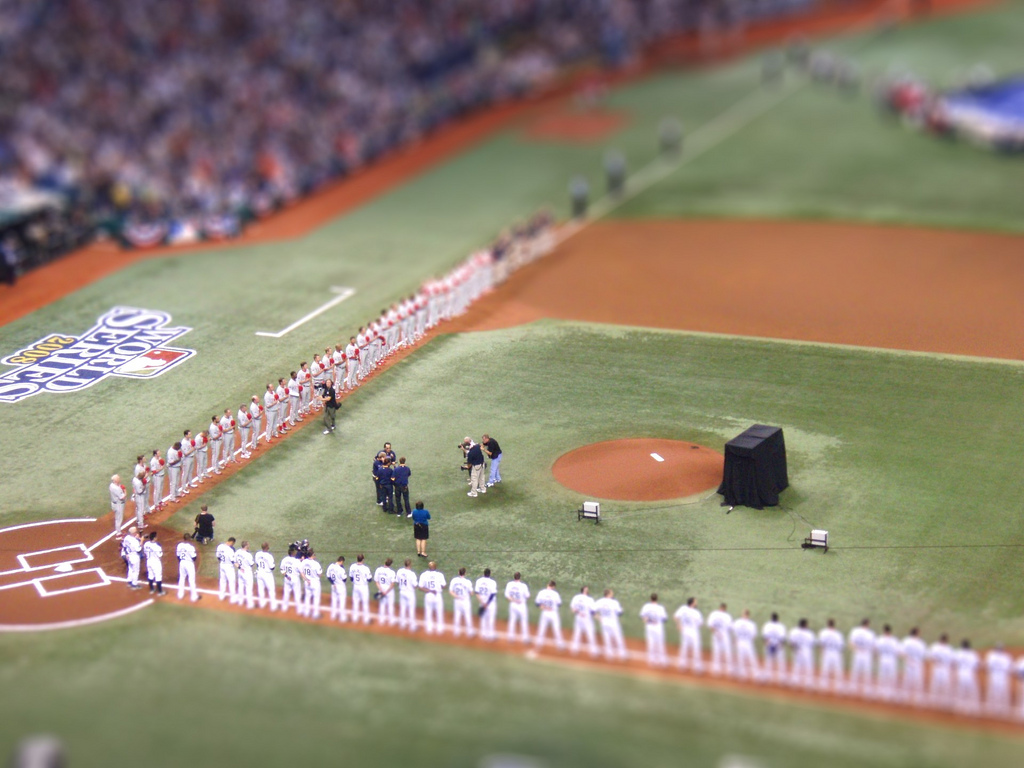
Rays and Phillies on field before Game 1 of the 2008 World Series

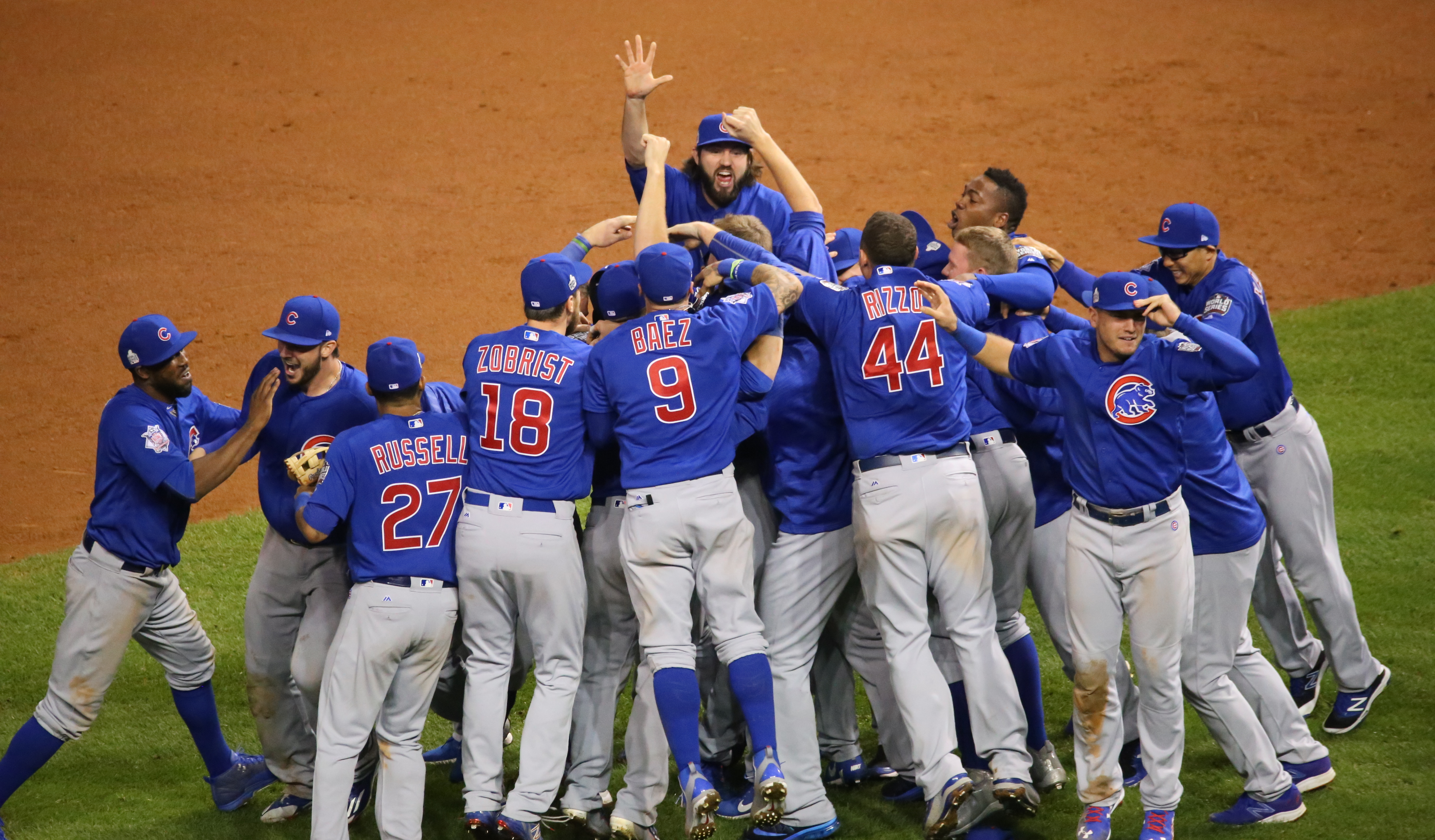
The Chicago Cubs celebrate winning the 2016 World Series, which ended the club's 108-year championship drought.

== See also ==
- AL pennant winners (1901–1968)
- AL Wild Card winners (since 1994)
- Asia Series
- Asian Baseball Championship
- Baseball at the Asian Games
- Baseball at the Central American and Caribbean Games
- Baseball at the Pan American Games
- Baseball at the Summer Olympics
- Caribbean series
- College World Series
- European Baseball Championship
- European Champion Cup Final Four
- European Cup (baseball)
- Home advantage
- Intercontinental Cup (International Baseball Federation (IBAF))
- Japan Series
- Korean Series
- Taiwan Series
- Little League World Series
- MLB division winners
- MLB postseason
- MLB postseason teams
- MLB rivalries
- NL pennant winners (1876–1968)
- NL Wild Card winners (since 1994)
- Negro World Series
- Women's Baseball World Cup
- World Series broadcasters
- World Series starting pitchers
- World Series television ratings
