= Charlie Hoehn =

- Born: May 28, 1986 (age 39); Colorado
- Education: Colorado State University
- Occupation(s): Author, entrepreneur, and public speaker

Charles "Charlie" Hoehn (born on May 28, 1986) is an American author, entrepreneur, and public speaker.

== Early life ==
Hoehn was born on May 28, 1986, in Colorado. He graduated from Colorado State University in 2008.

== Career ==
After graduating, Hoehn was disappointed with the lack of quality employment prospects. He participated in a virtual internship with Seth Godin. Later that year, he worked for Ramit Sethi to assist him with his speaking gigs and the launch of his book, I Will Teach You To Be Rich.

In 2009, Hoehn published an e-book called Recession Proof Graduate. In 2011, Charlie delivered a speech entitled "The New Way to Work" at a TEDx event held at Carnegie Mellon University, this speech was featured on NPR's TED Radio Hour.

Hoehn worked for Tim Ferriss until 2013. In 2014, Hoehn self-published his second book, Play it Away: A Workaholic's Cure for Anxiety. In 2017, Hoehn raised $35,936 on Kickstarter for his self-published coffee-table book, Play for a Living: Quotes from People Who Found Joy in Their Work, and Changed the World.

== Bibliography ==
- Charlie Hoehn (2009). Recession Proof Graduate: How to Get The Job You Want by Doing Free Work. CharlieHoehn.com. ISBN 978-0990354819.
- Charlie Hoehn (2014). Play It Away: A Workaholic's Cure for Anxiety. Charlie Hoehn. ISBN 978-0615918174.
- Charlie Hoehn and Mckenna Bailey (2017). Play for a Living: Quotes from People Who Found Joy in their Work, and Changed The World. ISBN 0990354857.
