= Quamut =

- Website type: Informational with some user generated content
- Available in: English
- Owners: Barnes & Noble
- Commercial: Free, but with ads by Google AdSense
- Registration: Not required
- Launched: March 2008
- Current status: Active

Quamut is a collection of how-to guides launched in March 2008 by the bookstore chain Barnes & Noble. The core line of guides are all editorially written, but there is also a section of user-contributed wiki guides. Quamut is formed from quam, the Latin word for "how", and ut, the Latin word for "to". It is pronounced /ˈkʷamut/.

Like its competitors Google Knol, Squidoo, and WikiAnswers, it generates revenue by the placement of relevant advertisement using Google's AdSense program. Additionally, Quamut guides are sold online as PDFs, and a selection are available for purchase as laminated charts in Barnes & Noble stores and from bn.com.

In August 2009 Barnes & Noble shut down Quamut, though the print charts continue to be available.
