= Revenue sharing =

Distribution of revenue

Revenue sharing is the distribution of revenue, the total amount of income generated by the sale of goods and services among the stakeholders or contributors. It should not be confused with profit shares, in which scheme only the profit is shared, i.e., the revenue left over after costs have been removed, nor with stock shares, which may be bought and sold and whose value may fluctuate.

Revenue shares are often used in industries such as game development, wherein a studio lacks sufficient capital or investment to pay upfront, or in instances when a studio or company wishes to share the risks and rewards with its team members. Revenue shares allow the stakeholders to realize returns as soon as revenue is earned before any costs are deducted.

Revenue sharing in internet marketing is also known as cost per action (CPA), in which the cost of advertising is determined by the percentage of revenue split with the affiliate. This method accounts for about 80% of affiliate marketing programs, primarily dominated by online retailers such as Amazon and eBay.

Web-based companies such as Helium, HubPages, Infobarrel, and Squidoo also practice a form of revenue sharing, in which a company invites writers to create content for a website in exchange for a share of its advertising revenue, giving the authors the possibility of ongoing income from a single piece of work, and guaranteeing to the commissioning company that it will never pay more for content than it generates in advertising revenue. Pay rates vary dramatically from site to site, depending on the success of the site and the popularity of individual articles.

In professional sports leagues, "revenue sharing" commonly refers to the distribution of proceeds generated by ticket sales to a given event; the amount of money distributed to a visiting team can significantly impact a team's total revenue, which in turn affects the team's ability to attract (and pay for) talent and resources. In 1981, for example, the Scottish Premier League changed its policy from splitting a match's receipts evenly between its two competing football teams over to a system in which the hosting team could keep all the proceeds from matches hosted at its facilities. This move is generally believed to have negatively affected the league's parity and enhanced the dominance of Celtic F.C. and Rangers F.C. In contrast, the National Football League distributes television revenue to all teams equally, regardless of team performance or number of viewers.

Some websites share advertising revenue with users who post content to their platforms. In 2007, YouTube began a Partners Program, sharing revenue with its top creators. In 2023, Twitter began making ad-sharing payments to Twitter creators.
