= The Dip =

The Dip may refer to:

- The Dip (book)
- The Dip (band)
- Dip (dance move)
