= The Big Moo =

Collection of essays edited by Seth Godin

The Big Moo: Stop Trying to be Perfect and Start Being Remarkable
- Author: Seth Godin (editor)
- Language: English
- Genre: Nonfiction
- Publisher: Portfolio
- Publication date: 2005
- Publication place: United States
- Pages: 183
- Preceded by: All Marketers Are Liars

The Big Moo: Stop Trying to be Perfect and Start Being Remarkable (2005) is a collection of short essays on marketing. The essays were written by 32 different well-known authors in the field. They included Tom Peters, Malcolm Gladwell, Guy Kawasaki, Mark Cuban, and Daniel H. Pink. The specific author of each essay, however, was not identified. The book's editor, Seth Godin said that to identify which author wrote what essay would have been a distraction. The goal of the book was to spark people's imaginations as well as raise money for charity. Proceeds from the book are donated to the Acumen Fund, the Juvenile Diabetes Research Foundation International, and Room to Read.

In 2006, The Big Moo was one of Amazon.com's top 10 advertising books.
