= All Marketers Are Liars =

Book by Seth Godin

- Author: Seth Godin
- Language: English
- Genre: Marketing, Business, Non-fiction
- Publisher: Penguin Group (USA)
- Publication date: 2005 (USA)
- Publication place: United States
- Media type: Print (Hardcover & Paperback)
- Pages: 186 p. (US hardcover edition)
- Preceded by: Free Prize Inside!: The Next Big Marketing Idea
- Followed by: The Big Moo: Stop Trying to be Perfect and Start Being Remarkable

All Marketers Are Liars: The Power of Telling Authentic Stories in a Low Trust World (2005) is the seventh published book by Seth Godin, and the third in a series of books on 21st century marketing, following Purple Cow and Free Prize Inside.

== Background ==
Godin said the inspiration came to him when he "watched the Democrats lose the election [in 2004]." He stated that although both candidates told lies, the candidate that won told the more believable lie. In particular, he noticed Karl Rove's ability to tell a story, noting that he's a "very good liar."

== Description ==
All Marketers Are Liars uses examples from areas such as organic products, the Goodyear Blimp, and Cold Stone to illustrate the power of marketing an authentic story. From the book jacket:

"All marketers tell stories. And if they do it right, we believe them. We believe that wine tastes better in a $20 glass than a $1 glass. We believe that an $80,000 Porsche Cayenne is vastly superior to a $36,000 VW Touareg, even if it is virtually the same car. We believe that $225 Pumas will make our feet feel better--and look cooler--than $20 no names. . . and believing it makes it true."

Godin uses the idea that consumers will believe not whatever they want to believe but also what the marketers want them to believe. The idea that there is no concrete 'self-fulfilling truth' is expressed in the preface.

"Here's the first half of the simple summary: We believe what we want to believe, and once we believe something, it becomes a self-fulfilling truth."

Godin claims that marketers are not, in fact, supposed to lie. Godin expresses that marketers should be storytellers - but truthful ones. From page XVI in the Preface:

"Here's the second part of the summary: When you are busy telling stories to people who want to hear them, you'll be tempted to tell stories that just don't hold up. Lies. Deceptions. This sort of storytelling used to work pretty well. Joe McCarthy became famous while lying about the "Communist Threat." Bottled water companies made billions while lying about the purity of their product compared with tap water in the developed world. The thing is, lying doesn't pay off anymore. That's because when you fabricate a story that just doesn't hold up to scrutiny, you get caught. Fast."

Following his own lead, Godin's title for the book is a lie. He wrote in the introduction:

"I wasn't being completely truthful with you when I named this book. Marketers aren't liars. They are just storytellers... I was trying to go to the edges. No one would hate a book called All Marketers Are Storytellers. No one would disagree with it. No one would challenge me on it. No one would talk about it."

== Press and reviews ==
Before its publication, All Marketers Are Liars was serialized in Fortune Magazine. It made the Amazon Top 100 bestseller list, and received press in the Miami Herald, The New York Times, and the Chicago Tribune. Godin also launched a blog in support of the book, which was relatively rare at the time.
