= Year of the Pitcher =

The following Major League Baseball seasons are often known as the Year of the Pitcher:

- 1968 Major League Baseball season
- 2010 Major League Baseball season
