= Purple Cow: Transform Your Business by Being Remarkable =

2003 book by Seth Godin

- Author: Seth Godin
- Genre: Business
- Publisher: Portfolio
- Publication date: 2003
- ISBN: 1-59184-021-X

Purple Cow: Transform Your Business by Being Remarkable is a 2003 book by Seth Godin. The book presents Godin's personal belief that creative advertising is less effective today because of clutter and advertising avoidance. The book advocates that companies produce remarkable products and target people who are likely to spread word of mouth about the product. USA Today said it "reminds business people of the tried-and-true path to success: Make a great product".

== Marketing and sales ==
Purple Cow was itself marketed through some of the techniques that Godin describes in his book. The first, self-published edition came packaged in a milk carton and was sold for just shipping and handling charges. The cover is purple and white, and the words are printed sideways. In the book's first two years of release, it sold more than 150,000 copies over the course of 23 printings.
