= The Dip (book) =

Book by Seth Godin

- Author: Seth Godin
- Language: English
- Genre: Self-actualization, Business, Non-fiction
- Publisher: Penguin Group (USA)
- Publication date: 2007 (USA)
- Publication place: United States
- Media type: Print (Hardcover & Paperback)
- Pages: 86 p. (US hardcover edition)
- ISBN: 1-59184-166-6
- Preceded by: Small is the New Big
- Followed by: Meatball Sundae

The Dip: A Little Book That Teaches You When to Quit (and When to Stick) (2007) is the tenth published book by former dot com executive Seth Godin. It is a 76 page book that illustrates the concept of "the dip"—a temporary setback that can be overcome with persistence—and how to recognize if the reader is within one worth pushing through or one where they should quit.

== Background ==
The rough idea for The Dip first materialized on Godin's blog. On an entry titled "The four curves of want and get," Godin shows four curves representing patterns of adoption. He ends the post with "How do you avoid killing something too early, or celebrating too early. And last, how do you know when to kill a dud," a theme that would reappear in The Dip. Five months later, Godin posted another entry titled "Understanding Local Max," in which he presented another success curve—this time nearly identical to the one that appears in his book—and analyzed the hypothetical conversation that would occur at four points on the curve. In addition to being the basis behind The Dip, the entry was also included in Small is the new Big, a collection of short pieces from his blog.

== Synopsis ==
Godin introduces the book with a quote from Vince Lombardi: "Quitters never win and winners never quit." He follows this with "Bad advice. Winners quit all the time. They just quit the right stuff at the right time."

Godin first makes the assertion that "being the best in the world is seriously underrated," although he defines the term 'best' as "best for them based on what they believe and what they know," and 'world' as "the world they have access to." He supports this by illustrating that vanilla ice cream is almost four times as popular as the next-most popular ice cream, further stating that this is seen in Zipf's law. Godin's central thesis is that in order to be the best in the world, one must quit the wrong stuff and stick with the right stuff. In illustrating this, Godin introduces several curves: 'the dip,' 'the cul-de-sac,' and 'the cliff.' Godin gives examples of the dip, ways to recognize when an apparent dip is really a cul-de-sac, and presents strategies of when to quit, amongst other things.

The book is also accompanied with cartoons from Hugh MacLeod, who publishes his cartoons on his blog gapingvoid and is the author of "How To Be Creative."

== Release and reception ==
In early March, Godin launched a companion blog to The Dip titled "The Dip Blog," in which he released details about the book and gave illustrative examples. On his subsequent book tour, Godin agreed to go to any place where people had bought 2,500 copies of his book. Godin made stops in 15 cities, totaling 37,500 books. The Dip peaked at #5 on the New York Times Best Seller List and sold 100,000 copies in its first month of release.

The book was met with positive reviews, receiving profiles in USA Today, The Miami Herald, National Post, South China Morning Post, Brandweek, and Entrepreneur Magazine. Chris Anderson, author of The Long Tail, and Guy Kawasaki also endorsed the book.
