= Seth Godin =

American author and dot com business executive

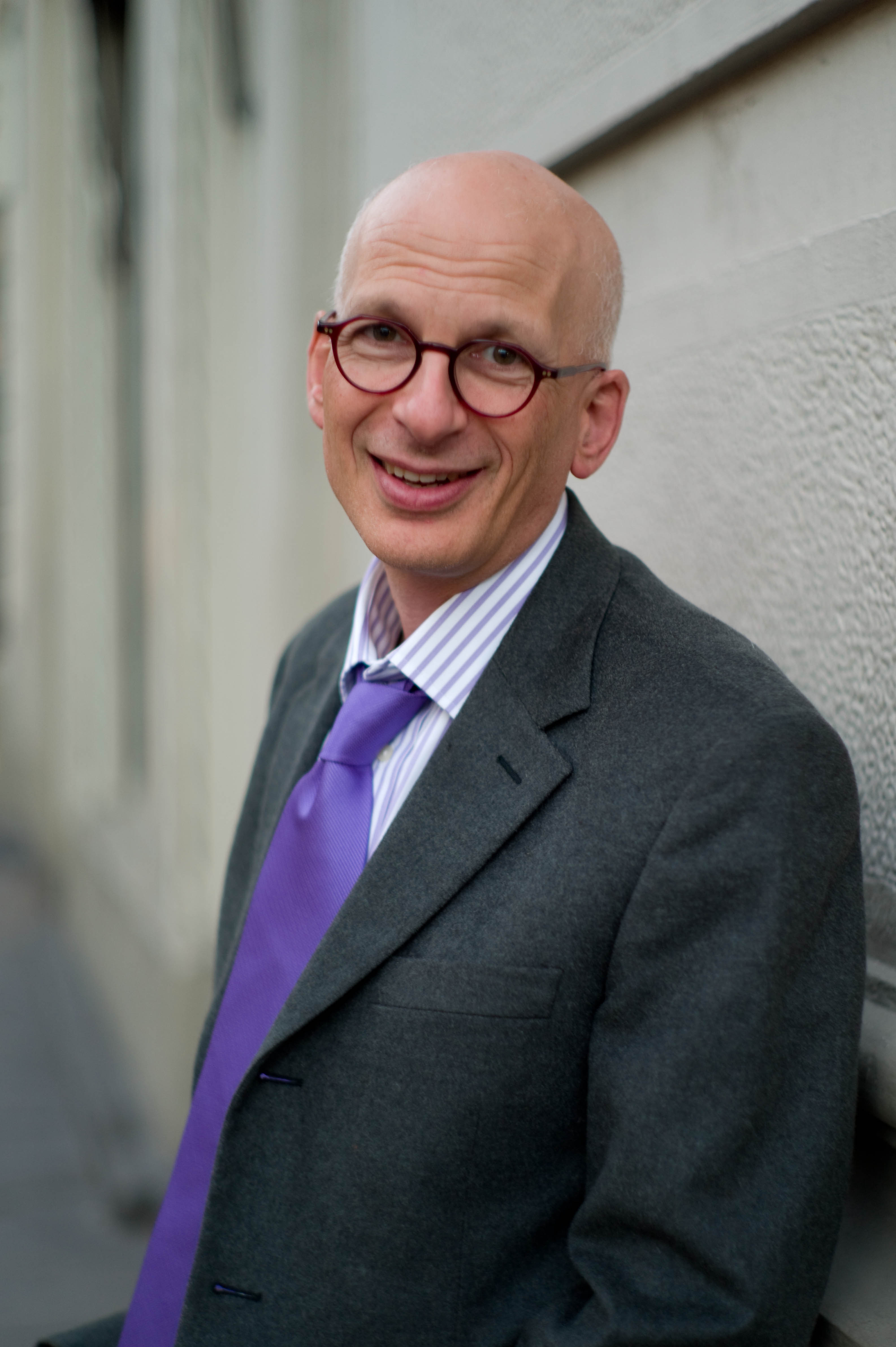
- Godin in 2009
- Born: 1960 (age 65–66)
- Education: Stanford University; Tufts University
- Occupations: Author, entrepreneur
- Website: sethgodin.com

Seth W. Godin, also known by his pen name F. X. Nine (born 1960), is an American author, marketing expert, entrepreneur, and former dot-com business executive.

== Early life and education ==
Godin graduated from Williamsville East High School in Williamsville, New York, in 1978.

He attended Tufts University, where he graduated with a degree in computer science and philosophy. He subsequently earned an MBA from the Stanford Graduate School of Business.

== Career ==
After leaving Spinnaker in 1986, Godin invested $20,000 of his own money to establish Seth Godin Productions, a book-packaging business that he operated from a studio apartment in New York City.

He later co-founded Yoyodyne, a company specializing in permission marketing, with Mark Hurst. The company was named after the fictional Yoyodyne corporation featured in the film The Adventures of Buckaroo Banzai Across the 8th Dimension.

=== Business ventures ===
Yoyodyne, launched in 1995, used contests, online games, and scavenger hunts to market companies to participating users. In August 1996, Flatiron Partners invested $4 million in Yoyodyne in return for a 20% stake. In 1998, he sold Yoyodyne to Yahoo! for $29.6 million and became Yahoo's vice president of direct marketing.

In March 2006, Godin launched Squidoo. By July 2008, Squidoo had become one of the 500 most visited sites in the world. In 2014, it was sold to HubPages.

Godin founded altMBA, a 4-week online workshop, in 2015. He also runs a podcast called Akimbo.

== Awards ==
Godin received the following awards:

- Forbes Business Book of the Year, 2004 for Free Prize Inside
- New York Times, USA Today & Wall Street Journal bestseller, The Dip
- Business Week bestseller, The Dip
- Business Week named Linchpin among its "20 of the best books by the most influential thinkers in business" on November 13, 2015.
- American Marketing Association's Marketing Hall of Fame, 2018
- Time 25 best blogs of 2009
- The 2018 Jack Covert Award for Contribution to the Business Book Industry Winner

== Personal life ==
Godin and his wife Helene live in Hastings-on-Hudson, New York. They have two adult sons.

== Selected works ==
- Godin, Seth. Permission Marketing: Turning strangers into friends and friends into customers. London, Pocket Books, 2007.
- Tufts Student Resources (1993). Seth Godin (ed.). Quick Lit: Plots, themes, characters, and sample essays for the most assigned books in English and literature courses. New York: HarperCollins. ISBN 0-06-461041-1.
- The Video Renter's Bible: 55 Lists that Make it Easy to Rent a Great Movie. New York: W.W. Norton & Company Inc. 1993. ISBN 0-393-31081-7.
- The Smiley Dictionary. Berkeley: Peachpit Press. 1993. ISBN 1-56609-008-3.
- Email Addresses of the Rich & Famous. Pearson Education. 1994. ISBN 9780201408935.
- Point & Click Internet: Get Online in less than an Hour!. Berkley: Peachpit Press. 1994. ISBN 1-56609-161-6.
- Point & Click Investor: Get Online and make the most of your Investments. Dearborn Financial Publishing, Inc. 1996. ISBN 0-7931-2344-5.
- eMarketing: Reaping Profits on the Information Highway. New York: Berkley Pub. Group. 1995. ISBN 0-399-51904-1.
- The Encyclopedia of Fictional People: The Most Important Characters of the 20th Century. New York: Berkley Pub. Group. 1996. ISBN 1-57297-073-1.
- You've Got Pictures!: AOL's Guide to Digital Imaging. America Online, Inc. 1998. ISBN 1-891556-51-7.
- If You're Clueless about Mutual Funds and Want to Know More. Dearborn Financial Publishing, Inc. 1997. ISBN 0-7931-2554-5.
- If You're Clueless about Insurance and Want to Know More. Dearborn Financial Publishing, Inc. 1998. ISBN 0-7931-2718-1.
- If You're Clueless about Selling and Want to Know More. Dearborn Financial Publishing, Inc. 1998. ISBN 0-793-12989-3.
- If You're Clueless about Financial Planning and Want to Know More. Dearborn Financial Publishing, Inc. 1998. ISBN 0-7931-2988-5.
- If You're Clueless about Saving Money and Want to Know More. Dearborn Financial Publishing, Inc. 1998. ISBN 0-7931-2556-1.
- Permission Marketing: Turning Strangers into Friends, and Friends into Customers. New York: Simon & Schuster. 1999. ISBN 0-684-85636-0.
- Unleashing the Ideavirus. New York: Hyperion. 2001. ISBN 0-7868-8717-6. – Detailing the idea of Viral marketing
- The Big Red Fez: How To Make Any Web Site Better. New York: Free Press. 2002. ISBN 0-7432-2790-5.
- Survival is not enough: zooming, evolution, and the future of your company. New York: Free Press. 2002. ISBN 0-7432-2571-6.
- Purple Cow: Transform Your Business by Being Remarkable. New York: Portfolio. 2003. ISBN 1-59184-021-X.
- Free Prize Inside!: The Next Big Marketing Idea. New York: Portfolio. 2004. ISBN 1-59184-041-4.
- All Marketers Are Liars: The Power of Telling Authentic Stories in a Low-Trust World. New York: Portfolio. 2005. ISBN 1-59184-100-3.
- Godin, Seth, ed. (2005). The Big Moo: Stop Trying to be Perfect and Start Being Remarkable. New York: Portfolio. ISBN 1-59184-103-8.
- Small Is the New Big: and 193 Other Riffs, Rants, and Remarkable Business Ideas. New York: Portfolio. 2006. ISBN 1-59184-126-7.
- The Dip: A Little Book That Teaches You When to Quit (and When to Stick). New York: Portfolio. 2007. ISBN 978-1-59184-166-1.
- Meatball Sundae: Is Your Marketing out of Sync?. New York: Portfolio. 2008. ISBN 978-1-59184-174-6.
- Tribes: We Need You to Lead Us. Portfolio. 2008. ISBN 978-1-59184-233-0.
- Linchpin: Are You Indispensable?. Portfolio. 2010. ISBN 978-1-59184-316-0.
- Poke the Box. Portfolio. 2011. ISBN 978-1-936719-00-6.
- We Are All Weird. The Domino Project. 2011. ISBN 978-1-936719-22-8.
- The Icarus Deception: How High Will You Fly?. Portfolio. 2012. ISBN 978-0-6709-2292-5.
- V Is for Vulnerable: Life Outside the Comfort Zone. Portfolio. 2012. ISBN 978-1591846109.
- Whatcha Gonna Do with That Duck?: And Other Provocations. Portfolio. 2013. ISBN 978-15918-4609-3.
- What To Do When It's Your Turn (and it's always your turn). Seth Godin. 2014. ISBN 978-19367-1931-0.
- This Is Marketing: You Can't Be Seen Until You Learn To See. Seth Godin. 2018. ISBN 978-0-525-54083-0.
- The Practice: Shipping Creative Work. Portfolio. 2020. ISBN 978-0-593-32897-2.
- The Song of Significance: A New Manifesto for Teams. 2023. ISBN 978-0-593-71554-3
