= HubPages =

Online publishing platform

- Type: Privately held company
- Industry: Internet
- Founded: 2006
- Founders: Paul Edmondson; Jay Reitz; Paul Deeds
- Defunct: 2026
- Fate: Shut down by owners
- Headquarters: San Francisco, California, U.S.
- Area served: Worldwide
- Products: Blog, online publication
- Owner: The Arena Group
- Website: hubpages.com

HubPages was an American user-generated online publishing platform developed by Paul Edmondson that was launched in 2006. HubPages acquired its main competitor, Squidoo, in 2014. In 2018, Seattle-based content company The Maven, Inc. acquired HubPages, and went on to rebrand as The Arena Group in 2021. The company is headquartered in San Francisco. In 2025 the company ceased accepting new content and announced the wind-down of HubPages, to be finalized in 2026.

Though the content was user-generated and owned, the editorial staff and engineers were responsible for managing, editing, moderating, and publishing articles across the two dozen network sites. The network sites focused on niche content that ranges from topics like automobiles and travel to beauty and pets.

== History ==
The site launched on August 5, 2006, funded by a US$2 million investment from Hummer Winblad. The three founders, Paul Edmonson, Paul Deeds, and Jay Reitz, are former employees of Microsoft and were part of the startup MongoMusic.

It raised $8 million between 2007–2008 and struggled for the next ten years.

In 2011, traffic to revenue-sharing sites, including HubPages, was slashed following changes to Google's algorithm ("Panda"). Over the ensuing years, HubPages made strenuous efforts to recover from the setback, while most of its competitors gave up and closed their doors. In 2014, HubPages acquired its largest competitor, Squidoo, in a friendly takeover.

In 2016, HubPages announced it was moving from a single-site to a multi-site structure with the introduction of separate "vertical sites". Each site contains articles covering a group of broadly related subjects.

In 2018, it was acquired by Maven which gave investors a mild payout.

HubPages has announced it is shutting down from November 2025 to be finalized in 2026.

== Memberships ==
Unlike its competitor Medium, HubPages was not a subscription-based platform and creating a user account could be done for free. Members posted articles and earned a share of the income from those articles through the HubPages Earnings Program. At one time, having an AdSense account was a prerequisite for being a member.
