= Squidoo =

Revenue-sharing article-writing site

Squidoo LLC.
- Company type: Search Engine
- Industry: Internet
- Founded: 2005
- Successor: HubPages
- Headquarters: Hastings-on-Hudson, New York, USA
- Key people: Seth Godin, Founder; Megan Casey, Cofounding member, Editor in Chief; Gil Hildebrand, Jr., Cofounding member, Chief Engineer; Corey Brown, Cofounding member, COO
- Number of employees: 14
- Website: hubpages.com

Squidoo was a revenue-sharing article-writing site. Articles were called "lenses". In 2010, the site consisted of 1.5 million lenses as of October 2010. On August 15, 2014, founder Seth Godin announced that HubPages had acquired Squidoo.

== History ==
Development started in 2005. The launch team consisted of Seth Godin, his book editor Megan Casey, former Fast Company employee Heath Row, Corey Brown, and Gil Hildebrand, Jr. The first version was developed by Viget Labs.

== Site structure ==
Squidoo was a user-generated Web site which allowed users to create multimedia pages without an understanding of HTML. Godin called articles "lenses", because he saw them as "[focusing] light and [showing] us what we need to see." Writers were called "lensmasters". In Squidoo's early stages, Godin noted that Martha Stewart and Jane Goodall's lenses did not receive large amounts of traffic, whereas lenses on myspace and the online game Line Rider were among the site's most successful.

Godin announced in January 2006 that the company would start a profit-sharing system whereby lensmasters would receive affiliate income from ads they placed in their lenses.

== Reception ==
After its debut, Squidoo was profiled in CNN, The New York Times, MSNBC, and The Washington Post. The site was given top prize in South by Southwest's community/wiki category in 2007. Squidoo challenged established information Web sites like About.com and eHow for traffic, while it remained similar in unique visitor numbers to other revenue-sharing sites like Mahalo.com and HubPages.
