= Miguel Rojas (baseball) =

Venezuelan baseball player (born 1989)

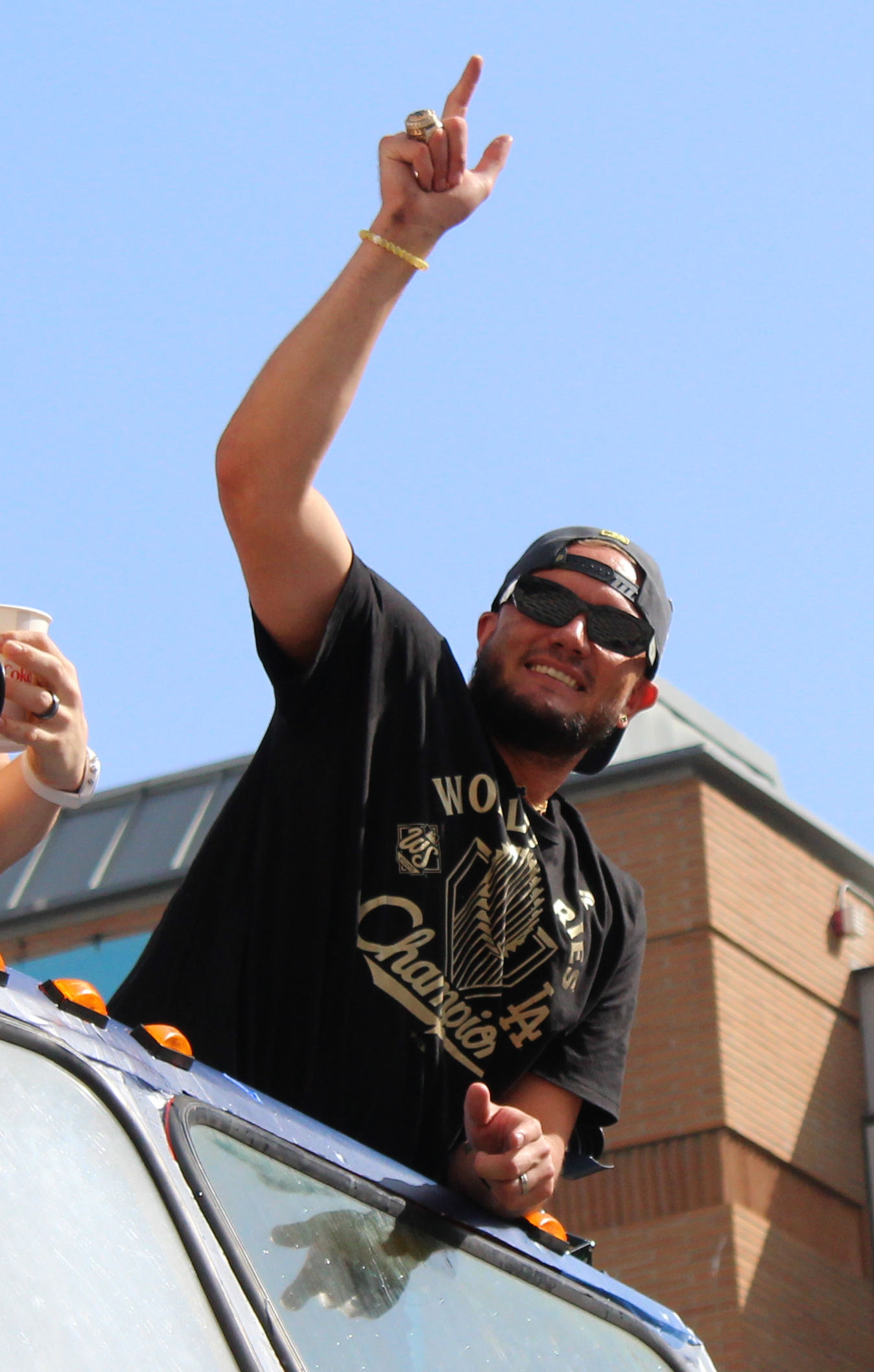
- Rojas at the 2025 Dodgers World Series victory parade
- Infielder
- Born: February 24, 1989 (age 37); Los Teques, Miranda, Venezuela
- Batted: Right Threw: Right

MLB debut
- June 6, 2014, for the Los Angeles Dodgers

Last MLB appearance
- September 27, 2026, for the Los Angeles Dodgers

MLB statistics
- Batting average: .260
- Home runs: 61
- Runs batted in: 386
- Stats at Baseball Reference

Teams
- Los Angeles Dodgers (2014); Miami Marlins (2015–2022); Los Angeles Dodgers (2023–2026)

Career highlights and awards
- 2× World Series champion (2024, 2025)

Miguel Elias Rojas Naidenoff (born February 24, 1989) is a Venezuelan and American former professional baseball infielder. He played 13 seasons in Major League Baseball (MLB) for the Los Angeles Dodgers and the Miami Marlins. In 2025, he became the first player in MLB history to hit a game-tying home run in the 9th inning or later of a World Series Game 7.

== Professional career ==
=== Cincinnati Reds ===
==== Minor leagues ====
Rojas was signed by the Cincinnati Reds organization as an amateur free agent in 2006 out of Venezuela and played for their affiliates in the Venezuelan Summer League and Dominican Summer League through 2007. In 2008, the Reds moved him to their domestic affiliate in the rookie-class Pioneer Baseball League, where he hit .183 in 61 games.

Rojas progressed through the Reds' farm system, playing for the Single-A Dayton Dragons in 2009, the High-A Lynchburg Hillcats in 2010, the Double-A Carolina Mudcats in 2010 and 2011, and the Double-A Pensacola Blue Wahoos and the Triple-A Louisville Bats in 2012.

=== Los Angeles Dodgers ===
==== Minor leagues ====
After the 2012 season, Rojas became a free agent and signed with the Los Angeles Dodgers organization. He spent the 2013 season with the Chattanooga Lookouts of the Double–A Southern League, where he hit .233 in 130 games. In 2014, he received a non-roster invite to Major League spring training, where he was given a chance to compete for the vacant second base job. The Dodgers assigned him to the Triple–A Albuquerque Isotopes to start 2014, where he hit .302 in 51 games.

==== 2014 season ====
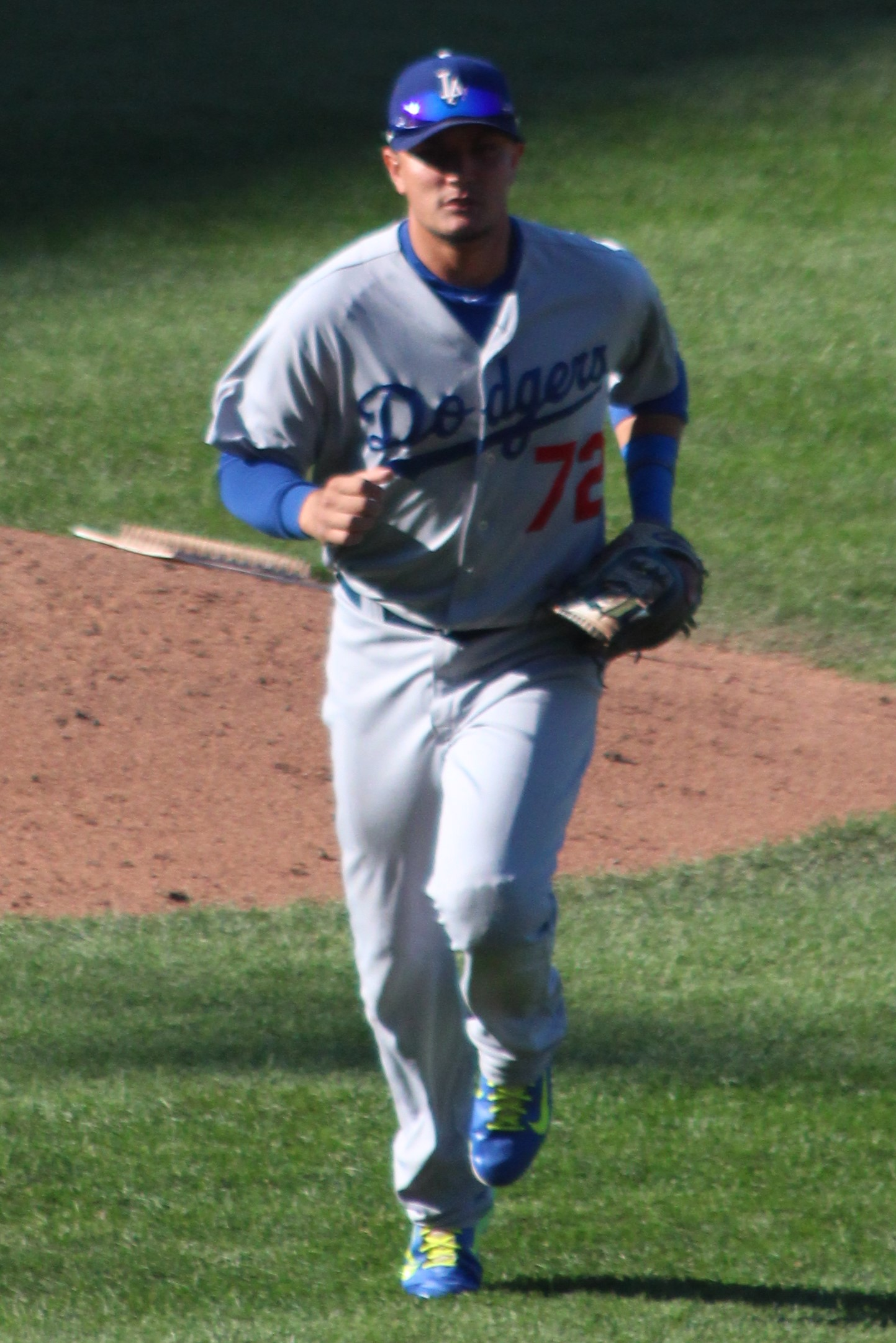
Rojas with the Los Angeles Dodgers in 2014

The Dodgers promoted Rojas to the major leagues for the first time on June 6, 2014. He made his major league debut that day as a late-inning defensive replacement. His first hit was a single off Matt Belisle of the Colorado Rockies in his first start on June 8.

Rojas finished the 2014 regular season hitting only .181 with one home run and nine runs batted in in 85 games. He frequently took over for Hanley Ramírez at shortstop late in games for defensive purposes. On June 18, he made an extremely difficult defensive play in the 7th inning to preserve a no-hitter thrown by Clayton Kershaw.

=== Miami Marlins ===
On December 10, 2014, the Dodgers traded Rojas, along with Dee Gordon and Dan Haren, to the Miami Marlins in exchange for Andrew Heaney, Chris Hatcher, Austin Barnes, and Enrique "Kiké" Hernández.

==== 2015 season ====
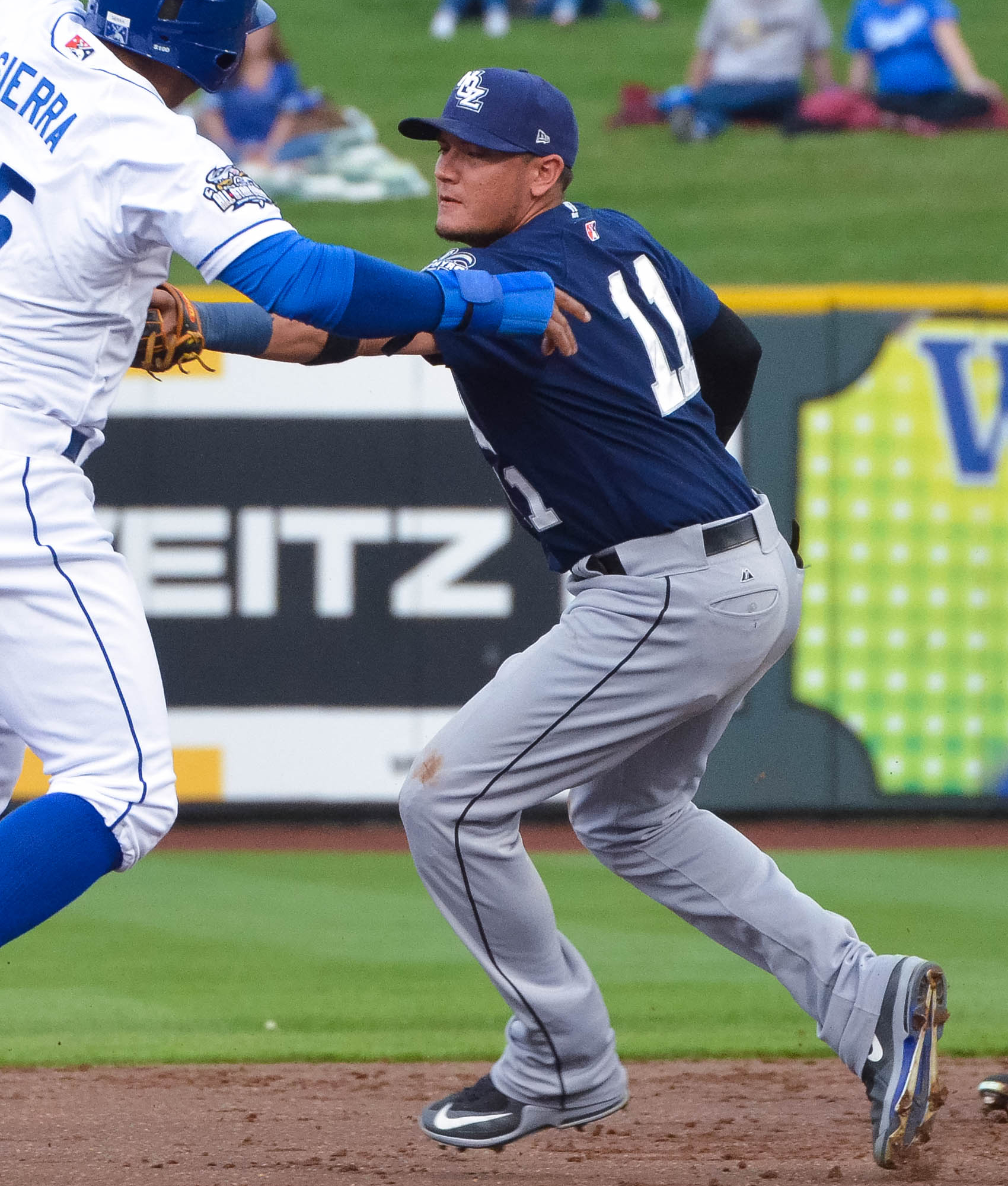
Rojas playing for the New Orleans Zephyrs in 2015

In 2015, Rojas batted .282 with one home run and 17 runs batted in across 142 at-bats in 60 games. This earned Rojas more playing time the next season as he appeared in 123 games, slashing .247/.288/.325 with one home run and 14 runs batted in.

==== 2017 season ====
In 2017, Rojas missed 62 games due to a broken thumb, but still appeared in 90 games, hitting for a .290.361/.375 batting line in 272 at-bats with one home run and 26 runs batted in. Rojas also led all NL shortstops in September and October with a .354 batting average and .948 on-base plus slugging average.

==== 2018 season ====
In 2018, Rojas set career-highs in nearly every offensive category; games played (153), runs (44), hits (123), home runs (11), runs batted in (53), and stolen bases (6).

==== 2019 season ====
In 2019, Rojas batted .284/.331/.379, with the lowest isolated power in the National League (.095). On September 23, 2019, Rojas agreed to a new two-year contract with the Marlins, worth $10.25 million.

==== 2020 season ====
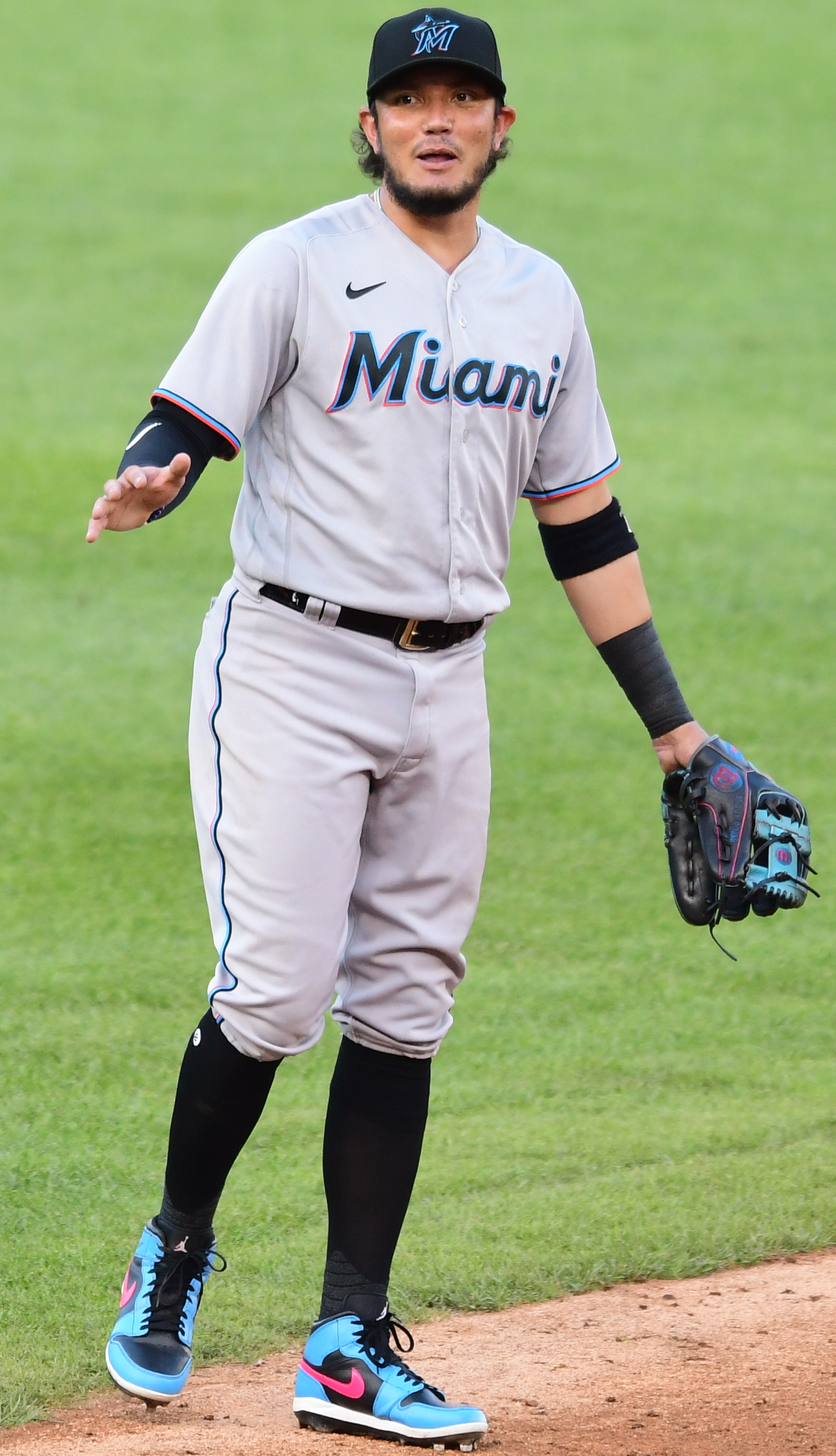
Rojas in 2020

In late July 2020, Rojas tested positive for COVID-19. Despite testing positive, Rojas partnered with the company Stadium Custom Kicks during the 2020 season, branding the partnership as Miggy's Locker. The partnership allowed Rojas to design custom-made cleats to express his passion in shoes and basketball. Overall in 2020, Rojas's batting line was all career-highs, with a .304/.392/.496 line on the year to go along with four home runs and 20 runs batted in. During this season, Rojas was involved in incidents with rookie teammate Jazz Chisholm Jr. that publicly surfaced in 2025. Chisholm accused Rojas of enforcing an "old-school" clubhouse culture, citing an incident where Rojas reportedly cut and poured milk into Chisholm's custom cleats. Rojas declined to address these specific allegations, maintaining that his conduct was professional.

==== 2021 season ====
In 2021, Rojas played in 132 games, collecting 131 hits, 48 runs batted in, 13 stolen bases, and a career-high 37 walks. On October 28, 2021, the Marlins signed Rojas to a two-year contract extension worth $10 million.

==== 2022 season ====
On October 3, 2022, it was announced that Rojas would undergo wrist surgery to repair a torn triangular fibrocartilage complex in his right wrist. He underwent an additional procedure in January after another minor issue arose.

=== Los Angeles Dodgers (second stint) ===
On January 11, 2023, Rojas was traded back to the Dodgers in exchange for Jacob Amaya.

==== 2023 season ====
On February 4, the Dodgers announced a contract extension with Rojas that would pay him $5 million for 2024 and included a $5 million club option for 2025. While initially expected to be a utility player, Rojas wound up the starting shortstop when Gavin Lux went down with a season ending knee injury in spring training. He played in 124 games, batting .236. He had two hits in six at-bats in the 2023 NLDS.

==== 2024 season ====
Lux returned in 2024 but moved to second base and Mookie Betts took over at shortstop, leaving Rojas as utility player to start the season before returning to short when Betts was hurt at midseason. He went on the injured list at the end of July with right forearm inflammation and returned August 7. He remained in the lineup until tearing his adductor muscle in late September. For the season, Rojas batted .283 in 103 games. The team voted Rojas the winner of the Roy Campanella Award, which exemplifies the spirit and leadership of the late Hall of Fame catcher. He started at shortstop for the Dodgers to begin the 2024 NLDS, and had two hits in eight at-bats over the first three games of the series. However, he aggravated a leg injury in the third game and did not play in the rest of the series and was left off the roster for the NLCS. Rojas returned to the roster for the 2024 World Series, but only played in Game 2, where he was hitless in three at-bats. He collected his first World Series championship when the Dodgers beat the New York Yankees in five games. After the season, the Dodgers picked up his contract option for the 2025 season.

==== 2025 season: World Series hero ====
Rojas switched his jersey number from 11 to 72, the number he first wore as a rookie with the team, as part of the team's pursuit of Roki Sasaki. He played in 114 games for the Dodgers in 2025 (68 at second base, 23 at third base, and 22 at shortstop) and batted .262 with seven home runs and 27 runs batted in. After the 2025 National League Division Series (NLDS), Rojas announced he would retire from professional baseball following the 2026 season.

In the postseason, Rojas had three hits in five at-bats in the Wild Card Series and was hitless in three at-bats in the NLDS. After not playing in the first five games of the 2025 World Series, Rojas was inserted into the starting lineup for Games 6 and 7. In Game 6 he made a tough catch at second base to help turn the game-ending double play. In the winner-take-all Game 7, with the Dodgers down by one and only two outs remaining in the top of the ninth inning, Rojas hit a game-tying home run off of Jeff Hoffman. Then, in the bottom of the ninth inning, with one out and the bases loaded, he made a defensive stop at second base on a bouncing ground ball and threw it to home plate for an out, preventing the Toronto Blue Jays from scoring a series-winning run. The Dodgers later won the deciding game in the 11th inning.

Rojas' game-tying home run had a 34.91% Championship Win Probability Added (CWPA), which made it at the time the most impactful single-game-tying home run in the 9th inning or later in World Series history (this was later broken by Will Smith two innings later in the 11th inning).

==== 2026: Final season ====
On December 5, 2025, the Dodgers re-signed Rojas to a one-year, $5.5 million contract. Rojas also announced that 2026 would be his final season as a player and he would remain with the Dodgers in a front office role after the season. On April 20, Rojas recorded his 1,000th career MLB hit, a single off José Quintana of the Colorado Rockies. He played in 105 games during the 2026 season, batting .267 with four home runs and 23 RBI.

On October 25, Rojas announced his retirement from the major leagues after the season.

=== International career ===
Rojas has played for Tiburones de La Guaira in the Venezuelan Winter League during the offseason since 2009, which included playing in the 2012 Caribbean Series.

== See also ==
- List of Major League Baseball players from Venezuela
