= Game 7 of the 2025 World Series =

Los Angeles Dodgers–Toronto Blue Jays game

2025 World Series Game 7
- Rogers Centre during the top of the ninth inning of Game 7
Los Angeles Dodgers	Toronto Blue Jays
5	4
	1	2	3	4	5	6	7	8	9	10	11	R	H	E
Los Angeles Dodgers	0	0	0	1	0	1	0	1	1	0	1	5	11	0
Toronto Blue Jays	0	0	3	0	0	1	0	0	0	0	0	4	14	0
- Date: November 1, 2025
- Venue: Rogers Centre
- City: Toronto, Canada
- Managers: Dave Roberts (Los Angeles Dodgers); John Schneider (Toronto Blue Jays)
- Umpires: HP: Jordan Baker; 1B: Adrian Johnson; 2B: Mark Wegner; 3B: John Tumpane; LF: Alan Porter; RF: Adam Hamari
- MVP: Yoshinobu Yamamoto, pitcher
- Attendance: 44,713
- Time of game: 4:07
- Ceremonial first pitch: Paul Molitor; Jack Morris
- Television: Fox (United States – English); Fox Deportes (United States – Spanish); Sportsnet (Canada – English); Citytv (Canada – English) (Note: Simulcast of the Fox feed); TVA Sports (Canada – French); NHK (Note: Games 1 and 4 on NHK G and NHK BSP4K Games 2 and 3 in NHK BS All games also streamed on NHK ONE) (Japan – Japanese); MLB International (International – English)
- TV announcers: Joe Davis, John Smoltz, Ken Rosenthal, and Tom Verducci (Fox); Adrián García Márquez, Edgar González, Carlos Álvarez, Jaime Motta, and Michelle Liendo (Fox Deportes); Dan Shulman, Buck Martinez, and Hazel Mae (Sportsnet); Denis Casavant and Karl Gélinas (TVA Sports); Tetsushi Sakanashi and So Taguchi (NHK); Dave Flemming and Ryan Spilborghs (MLB International)
- Radio: ESPN (United States – English); TUDN (United States – Spanish); Sportsnet (Canada – English) (Note: Simulcast of the CJCL feed); CJCL (TOR – English); KLAC (LAD – English); KTNQ (LAD – Spanish)
- Radio announcers: Jon Sciambi, Jessica Mendoza, Eduardo Pérez, and Buster Olney (ESPN); Alberto Ferreiro, Luis Quiñones, Eduardo Sánchez, and Jesús Acosta (TUDN); Ben Shulman and Chris Leroux (Sportsnet, CJCL); Stephen Nelson and Rick Monday (KLAC); Pepe Yñiguez and José Mota (KTNQ)

On November 1, 2025, the Los Angeles Dodgers and Toronto Blue Jays played a series-deciding Game 7 of the 2025 World Series to determine the champion of the Major League Baseball season that year. The Dodgers defeated the Blue Jays 5–4 in eleven innings, clinching their second consecutive World Series title after their 2024 victory over the New York Yankees. With their win, the Dodgers became the first team since the 1998–2000 Yankees to win consecutive or more World Series titles.

In the game, the Jays would get off to an immediate 3-run lead in the third following a Bo Bichette homer off Shohei Ohtani. The Dodgers would chip away at the Jays' lead in the fourth and sixth, cutting the deficit down to one-run 3-2. Toronto would attempt to put away the game in the bottom of the sixth with Ernie Clement scoring on a Andrés Giménez RBI double off Tyler Glasnow, making the score 4-2. Max Muncy would hit a homer in the eighth to once again cut the Dodgers' deficit down by one-run. However, in what is widely considered the turning point in the entire contest, the top of ninth saw Dodgers' Miguel Rojas hitting a game-tying homer on a full count off Jays' Jeff Hoffman, the latter club being two outs away from the title. In the bottom, Los Angeles escaped a bases-loaded situation with Dave Roberts bringing in Yoshinobu Yamamoto to pitch after pitching 96 the previous night, a crucial series-saving play by Rojas, and a critical fly-ball catch by Andy Pages to force extra innings for the fifth time in a winner-take-all in World Series history. In the eleventh, Dodgers' Will Smith would hit a go-ahead home run to put Los Angeles ahead of Toronto for the first time in the game. In the bottom, the series was decided after the Dodgers got a double play off a ground-ball by Jays' Alejandro Kirk, winning the game for Los Angeles and capturing their ninth title.

The game is considered to be one of the greatest World Series games of all time and one of the greatest games in the history of Baseball. Game 7 would see numerous feats; The game-tying home run by Miguel Rojas in the top of the ninth inning was the first such instance in World Series Game 7 history in which a game-tying home run was hit that late in the game. Andy Pages series-saving catch is considered to be one of the most critical plays in World Series history. Will Smith's series-winning home run by Smith in the eleventh was the first time ever in World Series Game 7 history in which a go-ahead home run was hit in extra innings. It was the fifth time in World Series history that a Game 7 went into extra innings, only the third time in history (and first since 1997) that a Game 7 lasted at least eleven innings, and just the second instance in which the visiting team won (the first being 2016).

It resulted in the Dodgers winning their third championship in six seasons, ninth overall, and marked the first time in franchise history the Dodgers successfully defended a World Series title from the previous year. Following the game, many analysts and writers said that the Dodgers' victory in the series, coupled with their previous World Series wins in 2020 and 2024, cemented their status as an MLB dynasty.

== Background ==
The Dodgers had come into the Series as clear favorites due to their star power and status as the defending champions, but the Blue Jays had home-field advantage due to finishing the regular season one game ahead of the Dodgers. Observers noted that the Jays' one game margin and resultant home field advantage was due in part to the third game of the Dodgers-Blue Jays regular season series from August 8–10 at Dodger Stadium. The Dodgers had taken the first two games and were on the verge of a sweep in the August 10 game, but while holding a one-run lead in the eighth, the Dodgers surrendered two solo home runs to the Blue Jays, and after tying the score in the bottom of the inning, allowed a tie-breaking third home run in the ninth (and squandering a bases loaded and one out situation in the bottom of the ninth) to lose, 5–4. Had they won that game and all other results remained the same, Los Angeles would have had home-field advantage and Game 7 would have taken place at Dodger Stadium. (In that scenario, the Blue Jays would have lost the division to the Yankees and would have had a more challenging route to the World Series.)

In the World Series, Toronto won Game 1 in a rout off the back of a nine-run sixth inning, just one run shy of the record for most runs in a single World Series inning. Yoshinobu Yamamoto responded with a complete-game victory for the Dodgers in Game 2, the first such game in a World Series since Johnny Cueto in 2015. With the series shifting to Los Angeles, The Dodgers won Game 3 in 18 innings on a Freddie Freeman walk-off home run, which tied the record for longest World Series game by innings. The Blue Jays regained control of the Series in Games 4 and 5 by roughing up a struggling Dodgers' bullpen; in Game 5, Blue Jays starter Trey Yesavage set a rookie World Series record for strikeouts with 12. The Dodgers won game 6 in Toronto after escaping a bizarre ninth-inning jam, winning the game on a fly-out double play of Addison Barger being caught at second base, and forcing the Series' decisive seventh game.

Pia Toscano sang the American national anthem and Noah Reid sang the Canadian national anthem. Jack Morris and Paul Molitor threw out the ceremonial first pitch. Blue Jays' Game 7 starter Max Scherzer was matched against two-way player Shohei Ohtani, making his first start ever on three days' rest. Scherzer became the oldest pitcher to start a winner-take-all World Series game. Coincidentally, Scherzer also started in the last Game 7 of a World Series in 2019, while a member of the Washington Nationals. This was Toronto's second Game 7 of the 2025 MLB postseason, after defeating the Seattle Mariners at the Rogers Centre, highlighted by George Springer's 7th inning three-run home run that turned a 3–1 deficit into a 4–3 lead and eventual win. With Game 7 taking place on November 1, it was the eight year anniversary of the Dodgers last World Series Game 7 in 2017, a game they lost 5–1 at home to the Houston Astros in a World Series that would later become mired in controversy. Enrique Hernández was the last player still remaining from the 2017 team.

== Game summary ==
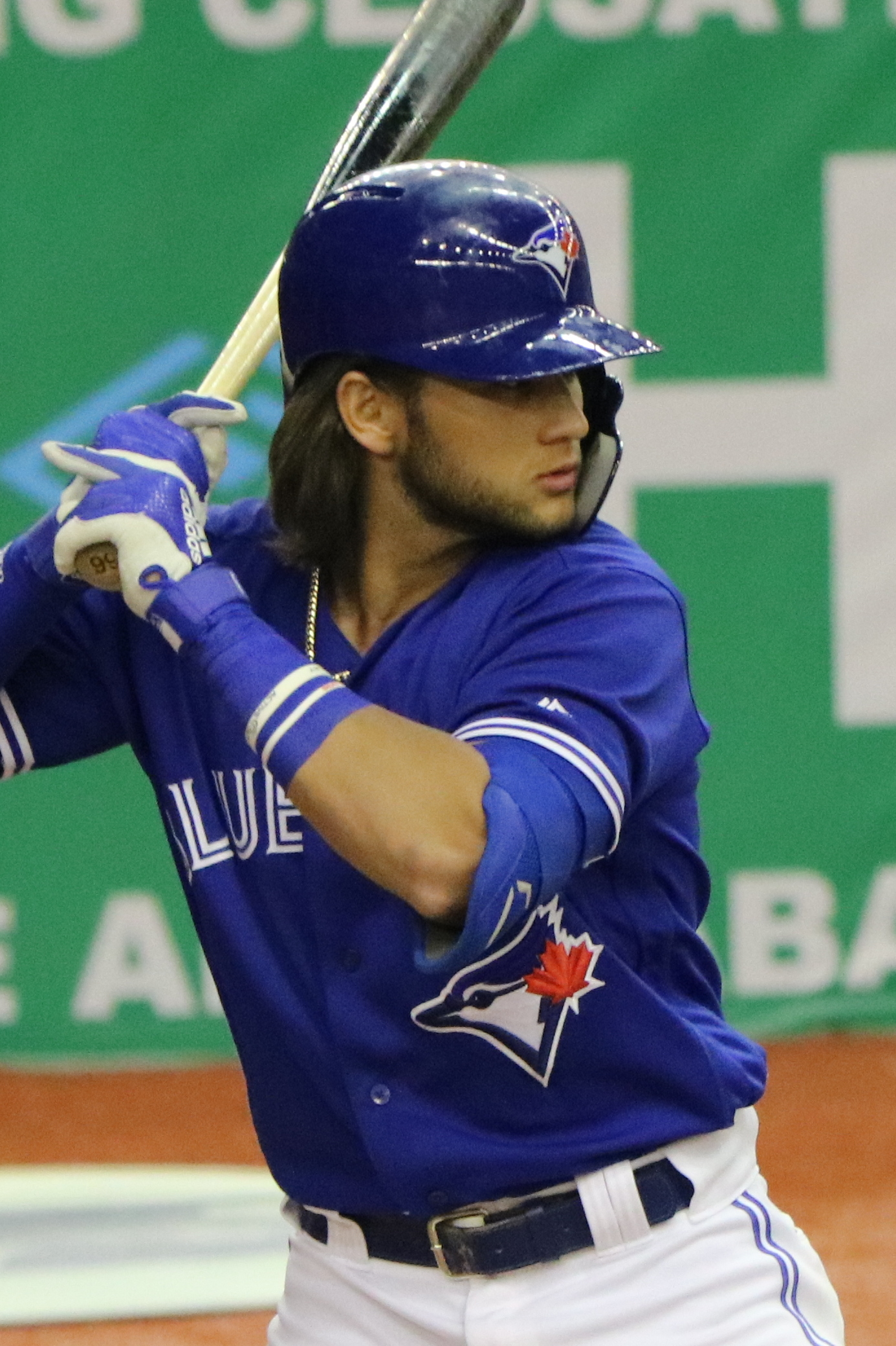
Bo Bichette hit a three-run home run in the 3rd inning off of Shohei Ohtani.

=== Innings 1–4: Blue Jays jump in front ===
After a scoreless first inning for both teams, in the bottom of the second inning, Dodgers' two-way player Shohei Ohtani escaped a two-out bases-loaded jam by striking out Andrés Giménez to keep the game scoreless. In the bottom of the third inning, a single by George Springer and a walk to Vladimir Guerrero Jr. preceded a three-run home run by Bo Bichette to give the Blue Jays a 3–0 lead. Ohtani pitched 2 1/3 innings, allowing five hits, three runs, and walking two batters while striking out three. The Dodgers loaded the bases in the top of the fourth inning before Blue Jays center fielder Daulton Varsho made a diving catch on a ball hit by Teoscar Hernández; Will Smith scored on the sacrifice fly but the catch saved further damage. The inning ended with another diving catch by Guerrero Jr. on a line drive hit by Tommy Edman.

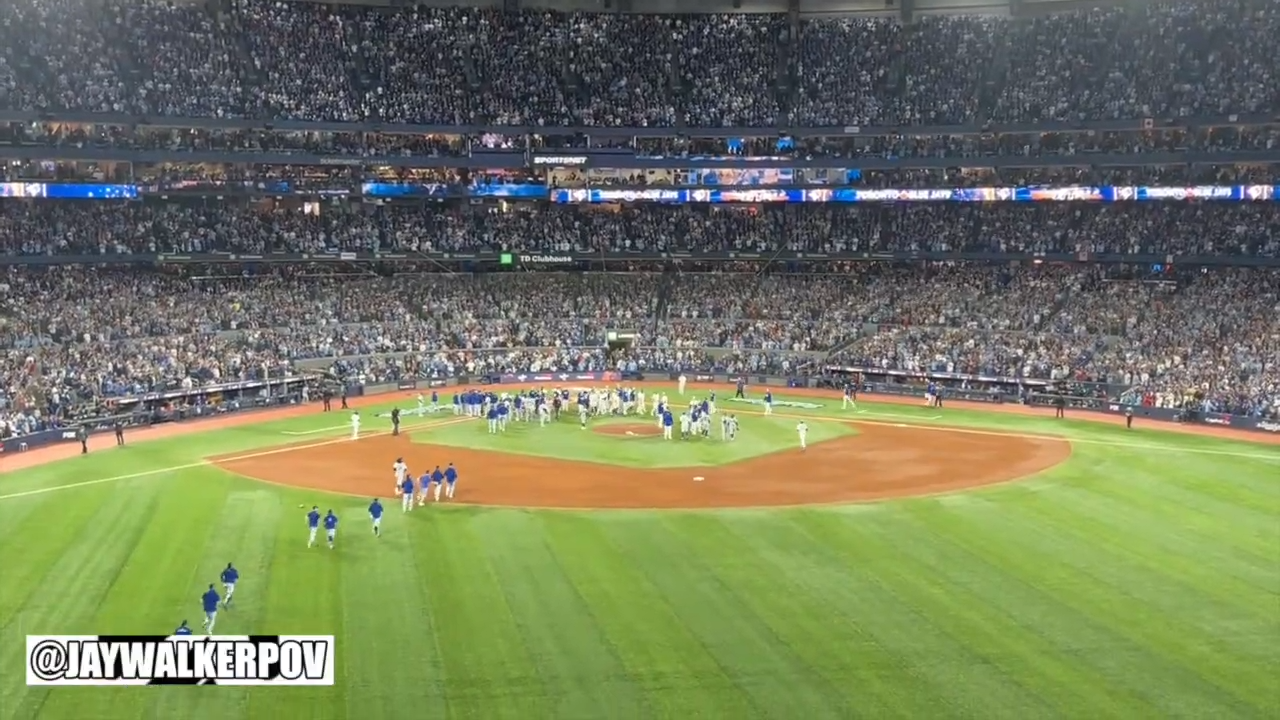
Benches clearing in the bottom of the fourth inning

In the bottom of the fourth inning with one out, Dodgers' reliever Justin Wrobleski nearly hit Giménez with two inside pitches – the second of which Giménez appeared to throw his arm at intentionally in an attempt to get hit – before a third inside pitch did hit Giménez, and resulted in a benches-clearing incident when Giménez argued with Wrobleski. During the incident, closer Jeff Hoffman got into a shouting match with several Dodger players, including Kirby Yates, who was not even on the active roster. According to Dodger reporter David Vassegh, multiple Dodgers screamed at Hoffman saying, "you don't want to get in this game". Once the umps got everyone settled down, Wrobleski allowed a single but eventually finished the inning without allowing a run. Days after the World Series ended, social media personality Jomboy investigated the benches-clearing incident and came to the conclusion that Giménez was at fault, owing to his apparent attempts to intentionally get hit by the pitch.

=== Innings 5–8: Jays try to hold off Dodger rally ===
Scherzer allowed a one-out single in the fifth inning before exiting; he pitched 4 1/3 innings, allowing four hits, one run, and walking one batter while striking out three. He was relieved by Louis Varland, who with his 15th appearance of the playoffs, set a record for most pitching appearances in a single postseason. Varland allowed another hit but also escaped the jam without allowing a run. In the top of the sixth inning, the first two Dodgers reached base off Jays reliever Chris Bassitt, with Mookie Betts eventually scoring on sacrifice fly by Edman to cut the Blue Jays' lead to 3–2. In the bottom half, utility player Ernie Clement led off with a single against Game 3 starter Tyler Glasnow, stole second, and scored on a Giménez RBI double to extend the lead to 4–2.

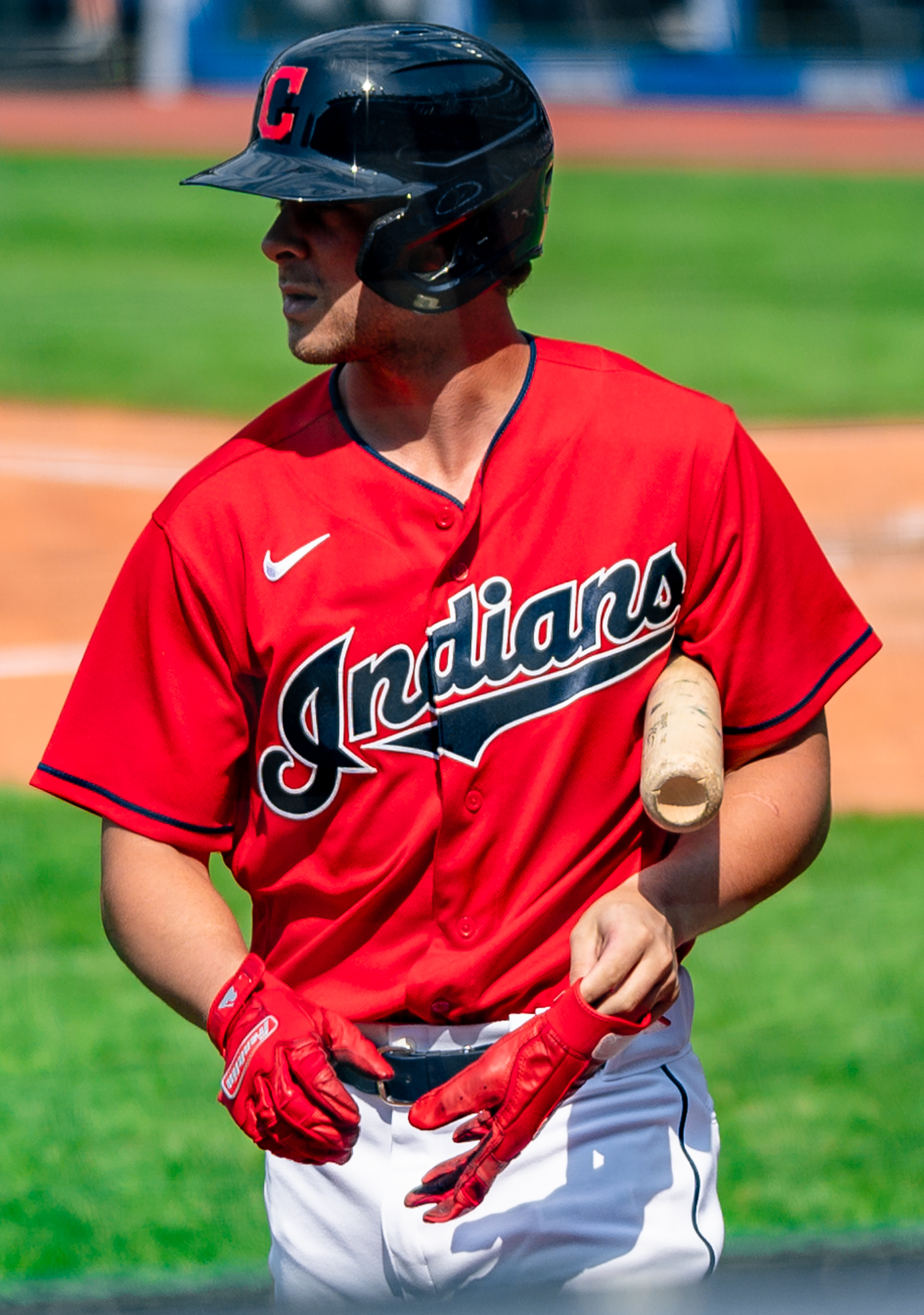
Ernie Clement (pictured with Cleveland) set a record for hits in a MLB postseason with 30.

In the top of the eighth inning, Max Muncy hit a solo home run off Game 5 starter Trey Yesavage to cut the Dodgers' deficit to 4–3, which prompted the Jays to bring in closer Jeff Hoffman for the four-out save; Hoffman retired Edman to end the eighth. Ernie Clement hit a leadoff double off Emmet Sheehan in the bottom half, setting a record for hits in an MLB postseason with 30. Dodger Game 5 starter Blake Snell entered in relief; Giménez hit a sharp lineout to drawn-in Muncy at third base, and Snell recorded two more outs to strand Clement at second.

=== Inning 9: Dodgers save their season with multiple heroic plays ===
Hoffman retired the first batter in the top of the ninth inning to bring the Blue Jays within two outs of a championship. He next faced nine-hole hitter Miguel Rojas; Rojas, who had been put in the lineup for a struggling Andy Pages after Game 5, had not had a hit coming into the game since the Wild Card Series one month prior. On a full count, Rojas hit a home run to left field off of Hoffman to improbably tie the game at 4–4. Rojas became the first player in MLB history with a game-tying home run in the ninth inning or later of a World Series Game 7. According to ESPN Insights, the Blue Jays had a 91.7 percent chance to win Game 7 before the homer.

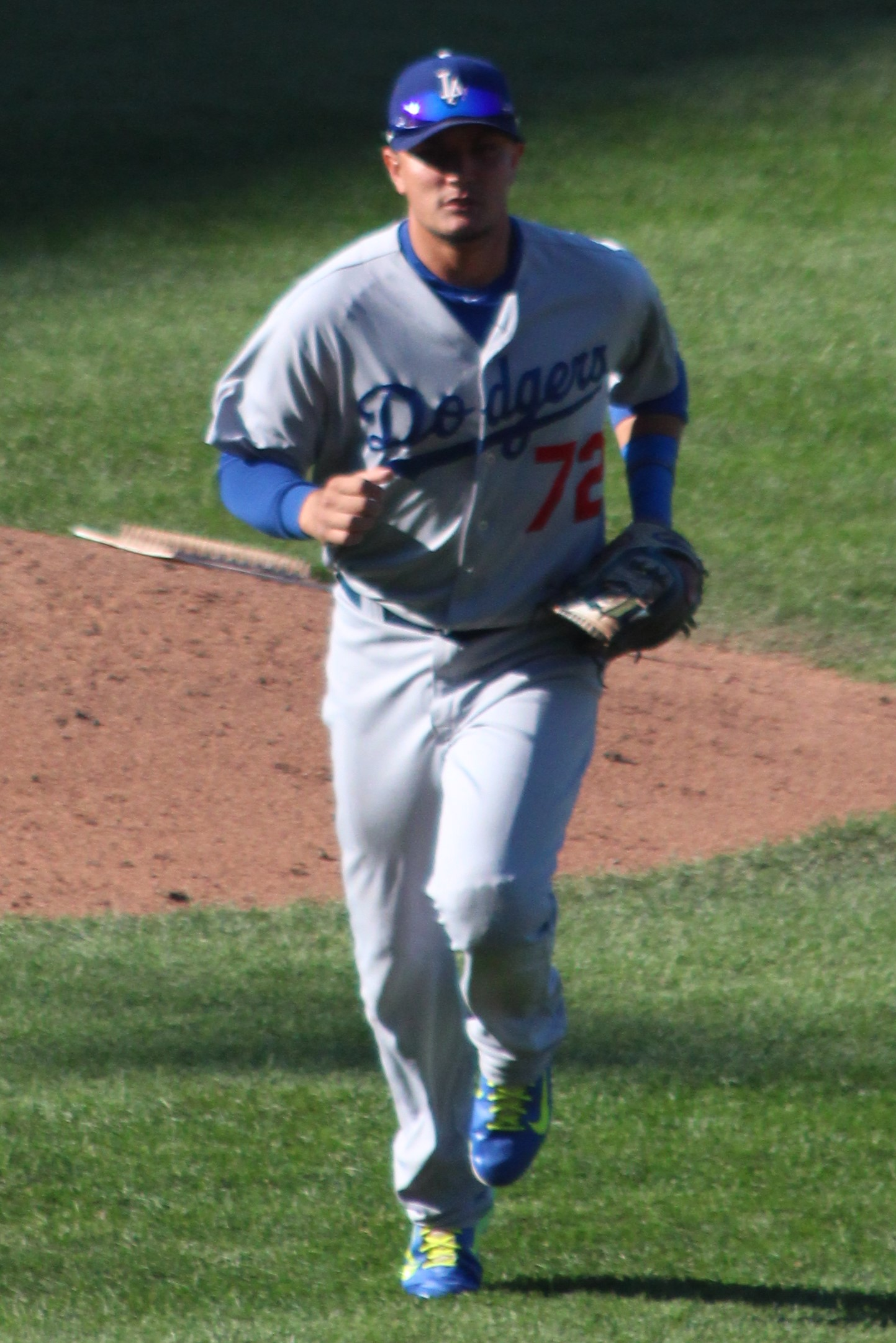
Miguel Rojas was the first player in MLB history with a game-tying HR in the 9th inning or later of a World Series Game 7.

In the bottom of the ninth inning, Snell attempted to force the game into extra innings. Vladimir Guerrero Jr. flied out to deep center on a 3–0 count, narrowly missing a championship-winning home run, before Bo Bichette singled and was pinch-run for by Isiah Kiner-Falefa. Addison Barger drew a walk to bring Alejandro Kirk to the plate; the Dodgers countered by replacing Snell with Yoshinobu Yamamoto, who had thrown 96 pitches the previous night. On the second pitch, Kirk was hit in the arm to bring Daulton Varsho to the plate with the bases loaded and one out. With the infield in, Varsho hit a grounder to second baseman Rojas, who stumbled as he fielded the ball but recovered to throw to Smith in time to force out Kiner-Falefa at home for the second out. The Blue Jays unsuccessfully challenged the call; though Smith's foot briefly came off the plate, replay confirmed Smith's foot touched the plate just before Kiner-Falefa's foot slid in. Clement came up with two out and the bases loaded and hit a fly ball to the warning track in left-center field, sending left fielder Enrique Hernández back. While Statcast gave him a 99% probability of catching the ball, he misread the ball, forcing him to attempt an over-the-shoulder catch in order to save the game. However, Dodgers center fielder Andy Pages, inserted as a defensive replacement before the prior at bat, ranged over and made the catch while colliding with Hernández to escape the jam. Andy Pages had to run 121 ft (37 m) in just 5.5 seconds, though Statcast gave him a 60% probability of catching the ball. Regardless, his catch was regarded as one of the most critical in baseball history.

=== Innings 10–11: Dodgers win back-to-back championships after more dramatics ===
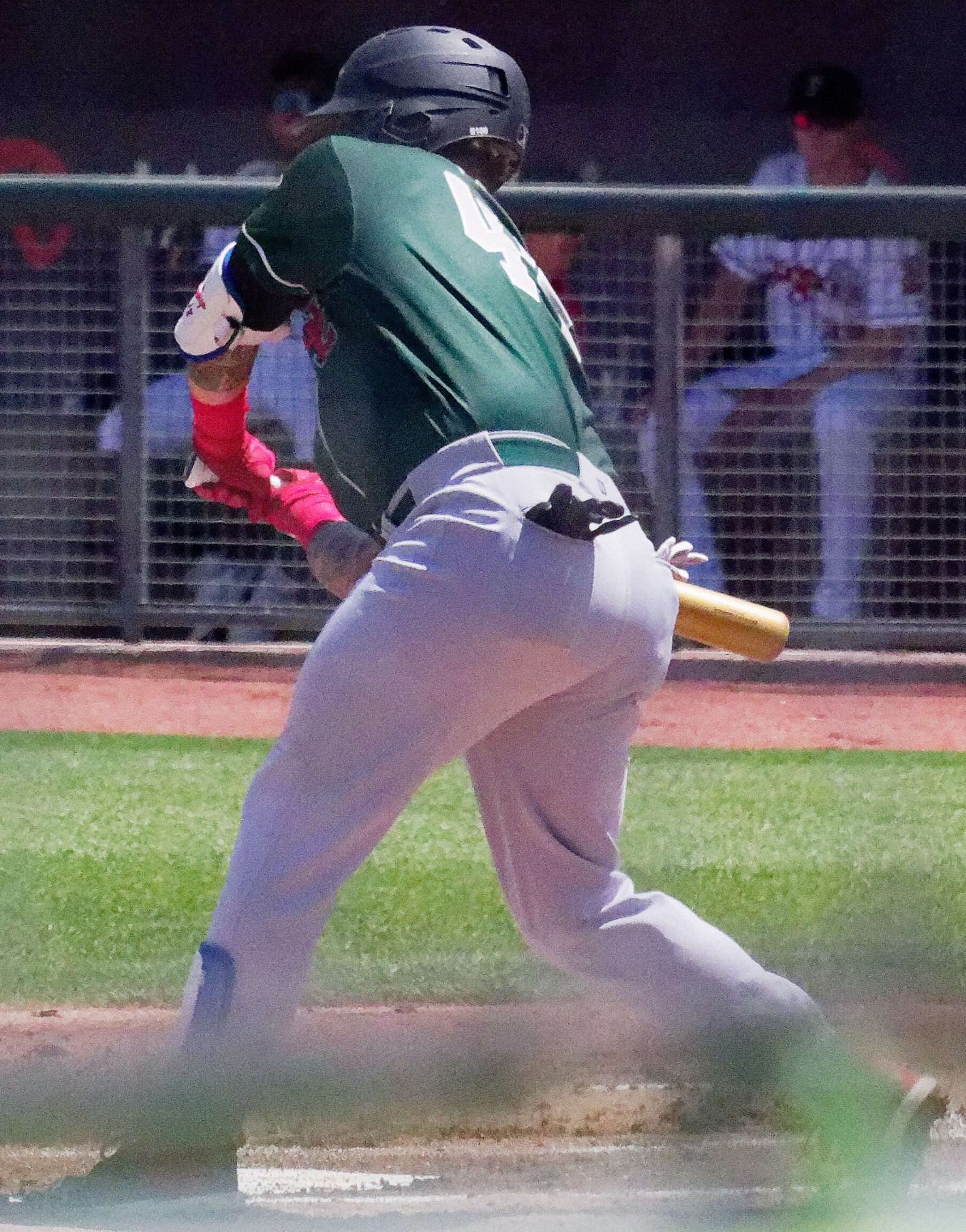
Andy Pages (pictured with a Dodgers' minor league affiliate) made a game and series saving catch with the bases loaded in the ninth inning, trucking over Kiké Hernández in the process.

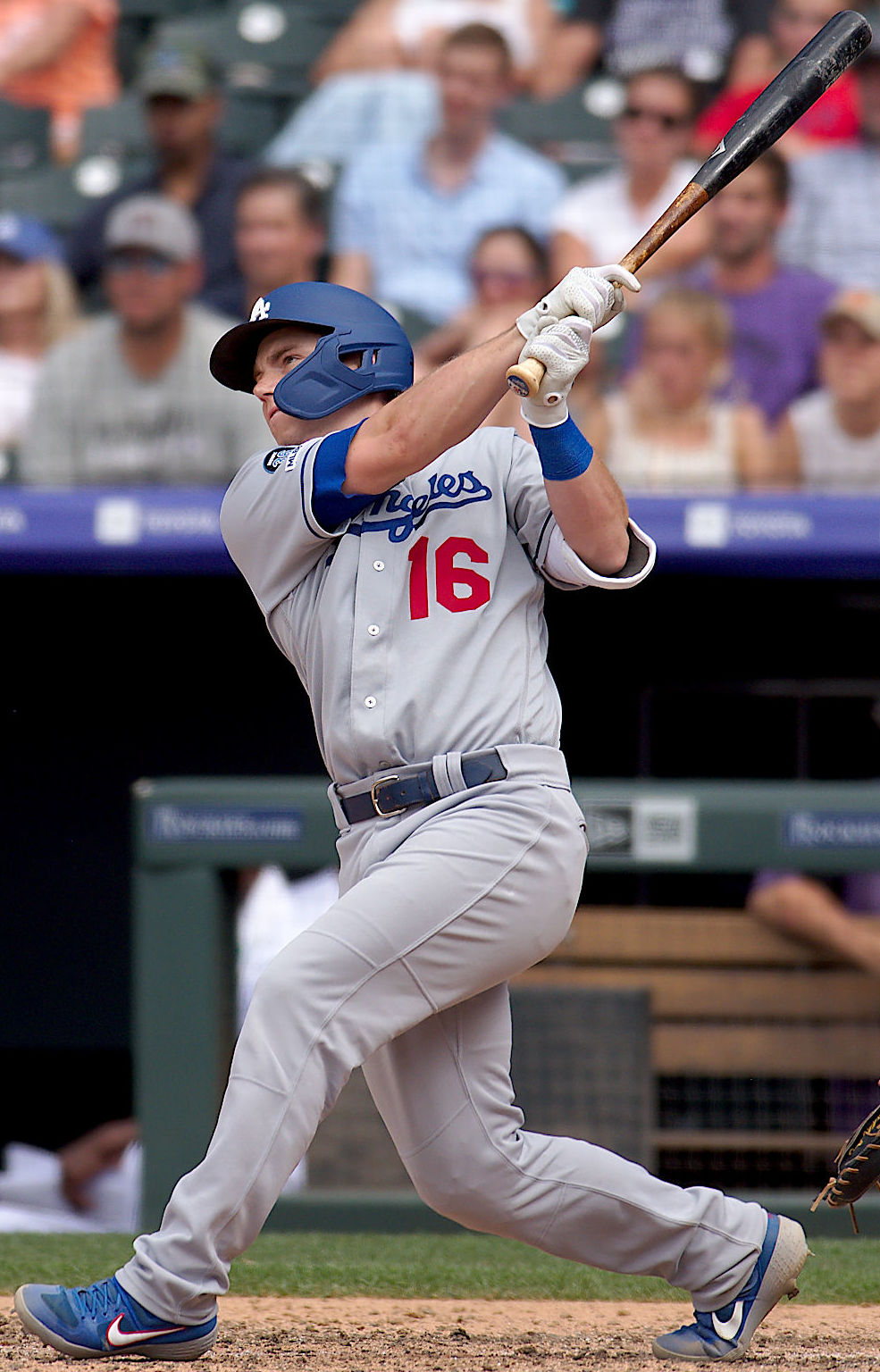
Will Smith hit the first ever World Series extra-inning home run in a Game 7, which turned out to be the winning run.

Seranthony Domínguez was sent to pitch for Toronto in the 10th. Mookie Betts drew a one-out walk before Max Muncy delivered a single and Teoscar Hernández drew a walk to load the bases, but the Jays got out of the jam with their own force out at home plate on a grounder hit by Pages, followed by a grounder to Guerrero Jr. by Enrique Hernández on which a covering Domínguez was just able to beat him to first base. With another chance to secure a walk-off win, the Blue Jays instead went down in order to send the game to the 11th inning to make it the first Game 7 to go past the tenth since 1997 and the third overall. Game 4 starter Shane Bieber pitched for Toronto in the 11th, and Will Smith hit a two-out home run off Bieber to give Los Angeles a 5–4 lead, also becoming the first player to hit an extra-inning home run in a World Series Game 7. This was, at the time, the fourth biggest play in terms of Championship Win Percentage Added (CWPA) in MLB history, a record which would be broken in the bottom of that very inning.

In the bottom of the 11th, Guerrero Jr. lined a leadoff double into the left field corner before Kiner-Falefa laid down a sacrifice bunt to advance Guerrero to third base with one out. Barger then drew a walk to set up Kirk at the plate with runners on the corners. On an 0–2 pitch, Kirk hit a broken-bat ground ball to Dodger shortstop Betts, who stepped on second and threw to Freeman at first to complete the game, series, and season-ending double play. That play overtook Will Smith’s homer earlier in the inning as the fourth biggest play in terms of CWPA. The plate appearances for Barger and Kirk were baseball's first golden pitches—a situation where either team could win a championship on that pitch—since the 2016 World Series. Toronto went 3-for-17 with runners in scoring position, tying the record for most runners stranded on base in a World Series Game 7 set in 1924 by the New York Giants. The Dodgers became the first team to repeat as champions since the New York Yankees won three straight between 1998 and 2000.

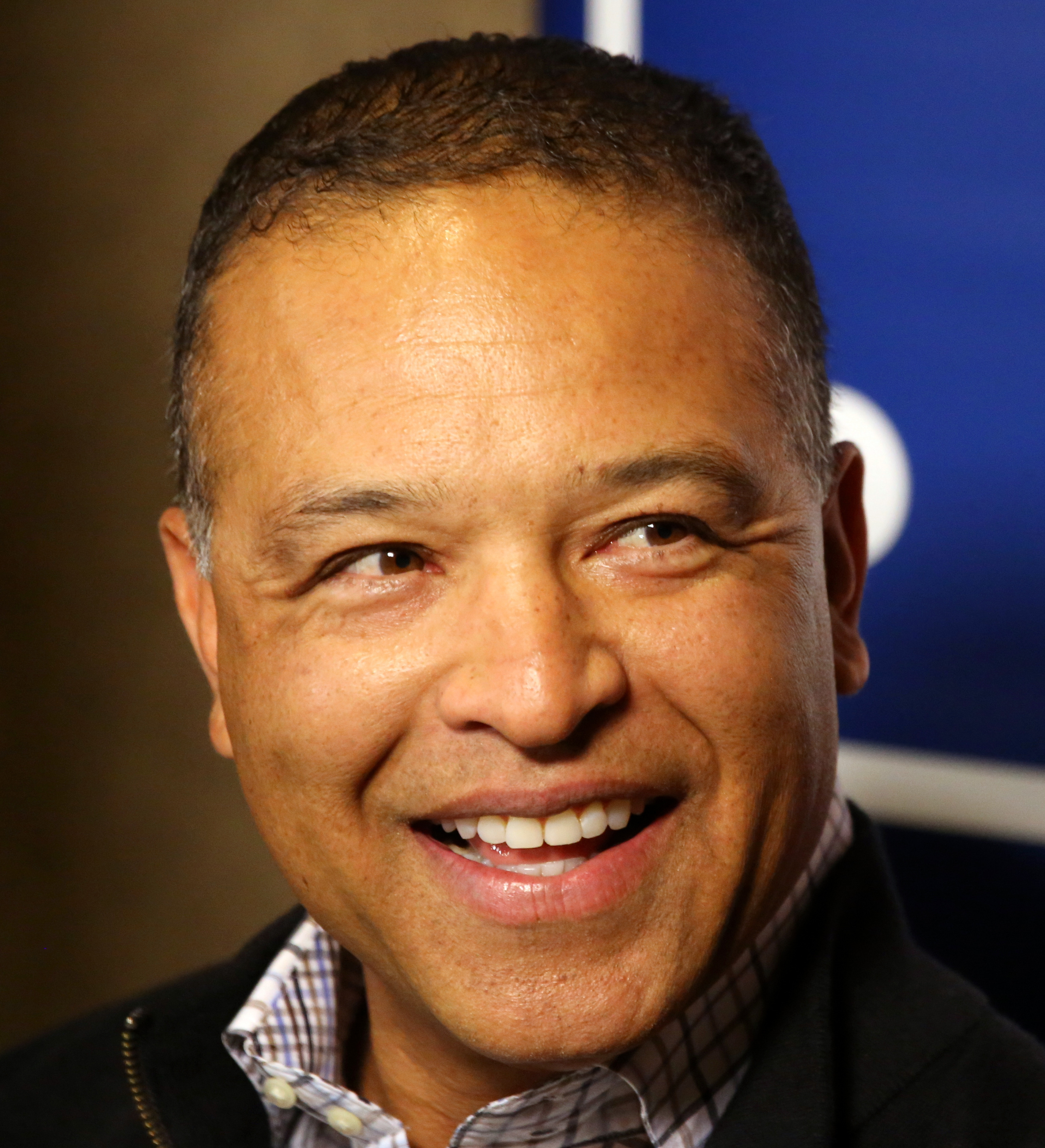
Dodgers' manager Dave Roberts received praise for his substitution of Edman for Pages in centerfield in the middle of the bottom half of the ninth inning.

Yoshinobu Yamamoto won the World Series Most Valuable Player Award, the first pitcher to win the award since Stephen Strasburg in 2019. Yamamoto recorded three wins and 15 strikeouts with a 1.02 ERA. Yamamoto was the first pitcher to get three road wins in a World Series (Games 2, 6, and 7), and the second since 1968 to be credited with three wins in a World Series, joining Randy Johnson in 2001.

Some consider this game as one of the greatest games of professional baseball ever played, as well as crowning the 2025 Fall Classic as one of the greatest World Series of all time. Overall, Game 7 had three of the top twelve World Series plays of all-time according to win probability added (WPA)—Rojas and Smith home runs and the ground ball double-play started by Mookie Betts to end the game. Just Game 7 of the 1960 World Series had more than one in the top 12.

=== Linescore ===
November 1, 2025 8:10 pm (EDT) at Rogers Centre in Toronto, Ontario 68 °F (20 °C), Roof Closed
Team	1	2	3	4	5	6	7	8	9	10	11	R	H	E
Los Angeles	0	0	0	1	0	1	0	1	1	0	1	5	11	0
Toronto	0	0	3	0	0	1	0	0	0	0	0	4	14	0
WP: Yoshinobu Yamamoto (3–0) LP: Shane Bieber (1–1); Home runs: LAD: Max Muncy (2), Miguel Rojas (1), Will Smith (2); TOR: Bo Bichette (1); Attendance: 44,713; Boxscore

=== Boxscore ===
Los Angeles Dodgers batting
Batter	Pos.	AB	R	H	RBI	BB	K	AVG	OPS
Shohei Ohtani	P-DH	5	0	2	0	1	0	.265	1.096
Will Smith	C	6	2	2	1	0	1	.276	.778
Freddie Freeman	1B	6	0	1	0	0	0	.221	.720
Mookie Betts	SS	3	1	0	0	2	0	.229	.647
Max Muncy	3B	4	1	3	1	1	1	.214	.764
Teoscar Hernández	RF	3	0	0	1	1	0	.257	.789
Justin Dean	CF	0	0	0	0	0	0	.000	.000
Tommy Edman	CF	3	0	0	1	0	0	.222	.619
Andy Pages	CF-RF	1	0	0	0	0	0	.078	.211
Kiké Hernández	LF	5	0	1	0	0	2	.250	.649
Miguel Rojas	2B	5	1	2	1	0	1	.278	.760
Hyeseong Kim	2B	0	0	0	0	0	0	.000	.000
Total		41	5	11	5	5	5		

Los Angeles Dodgers pitching
Pitcher	IP	H	R	ER	BB	K	HR	ERA
Shohei Ohtani	2.1	5	3	3	2	3	1	4.43
Justin Wrobleski	1.1	2	0	0	0	2	0	0.00
Tyler Glasnow	2.1	3	1	1	0	2	0	1.69
Emmet Sheehan	1.0	2	0	0	0	2	0	8.59
Blake Snell	1.1	1	0	0	1	2	0	3.18
Yoshinobu Yamamoto (W, 5–1)	2.2	1	0	0	1	1	0	1.45
Total	11.0	14	4	4	4	12	1	

Toronto Blue Jays batting
Batter	Pos.	AB	R	H	RBI	BB	K	AVG	OPS
George Springer	DH	6	1	3	0	0	3	.284	.899
Nathan Lukes	LF	3	0	0	0	0	2	.274	.667
Davis Schneider	PH	1	0	0	0	0	1	.200	.733
Myles Straw	LF	1	0	0	0	0	0	.111	.269
Vladimir Guerrero Jr.	1B	5	1	1	0	1	1	.397	1.289
Bo Bichette	2B	4	1	2	3	1	1	.348	.922
Isiah Kiner-Falefa	PR-2B	0	0	0	0	0	0	.162	.400
Addison Barger	RF	4	0	2	0	2	1	.367	1.024
Alejandro Kirk	C	5	0	2	0	0	0	.254	.842
Daulton Varsho	CF	5	0	0	0	0	2	.227	.711
Ernie Clement	3B	5	1	3	0	0	0	.411	.978
Andrés Giménez	SS	4	0	1	1	0	1	.215	.626
Total		43	4	14	4	4	12		

Toronto Blue Jays pitching
Pitcher	IP	H	R	ER	BB	K	HR	ERA
Max Scherzer	4.1	4	1	1	1	3	0	3.77
Louis Varland	0.2	1	0	0	0	0	0	3.94
Chris Bassitt (H, 2)	1.0	2	1	1	1	0	0	1.04
Trey Yesavage (H, 1)	1.2	1	1	1	1	0	1	3.58
Jeff Hoffman (BS, 1)	1.1	1	1	1	0	2	1	1.46
Seranthony Domínguez	1.0	1	0	0	2	0	0	3.18
Shane Bieber (L, 2–1)	1.0	1	1	1	0	0	1	3.86
Total	11.0	11	5	5	5	5	3	

== Aftermath ==
=== Immediate reaction ===
While hailed as one of the best World Series ever, Toronto's defeat was subsequently called one of the most devastating losses in World Series history, comparable to the 1986 Red Sox and 2011 Rangers, both of whom were one-out away from clinching a championship; Texas was one-out and one strike away twice, while Boston was up 5–3 with two-outs and no one on base. However, those near-championships occurred during a Game 6, with the Red Sox and Rangers still having a Game 7 left to play. Toronto’s loss occurred in a Game 7 which they led with two outs remaining, where they were also at home in front of their own fans (the Red Sox and Rangers were on the road). This was the city’s first loss in the championship round in one of the four major sports leagues since the 1960 Stanley Cup Final. Before the start of the following season, four-time NBA Champion head coach Steve Kerr wrote a handwritten letter to Blue Jays manager John Schneider. Having gone through a similar loss in Game 7 of the 2016 NBA Finals, Kerr wrote in the letter, "the loss won’t define you, but the way you and your guys carried themselves afterwards will.”

Isiah Kiner-Falefa being forced out at home plate in the ninth inning became one of the most dissected plays in World Series history. After the game, Kiner-Falefa received heavy criticism for both taking too small of a lead and for not running through home plate; many felt he should have scored on the play, which would have given the Blue Jays the walk-off World Series win. Blue Jays manager John Schneider defended Kiner-Falefa's short lead, emphasizing the desire to not get picked off in the event of a line drive to third base. Before the 2026 season, MLB released a report regarding the play which concluded that Kiner-Falefa was in fact out by a little more than three feet, as Dodgers catcher Will Smith's foot was on home plate earlier than it originally seemed.

Sportsnet analyst Caleb Joseph also received some criticism after discrediting the Dodgers' win in the post-game show after Game 7. "It’s gonna sound like sour grapes, and I don’t really give a shit. I think the better team did not win this series... I don't think the Baseball Gods got it right", he stated. Kiké Hernández responded on Instagram by jokingly writing, "I’M SO HAPPY THE BETTER TEAM DIDN’T WIN!" with a picture of him holding the World Series trophy. A week after the series, Blue Jays outfielder Davis Schneider offered a more humble take, stating, "If we played better, we would've won. The Dodgers deserved the win." On Mookie Betts' podcast after the Dodgers' World Series parade, some Dodgers admitted, including Kiké Hernández, the team had been on the brink of defeat at several times during the Series.

=== 2025–26 off-season ===
Conversely, the Dodgers' win intensified claims that they were "ruining" baseball, due to their extremely large payroll. These claims continued in the off-season when the Dodgers outbid the Blue Jays (and Mets) for star outfielder Kyle Tucker on January 15, 2026, signing him to one of the richest contracts in sports history with an average annual value of over $60 million per season. By turning down the Blue Jays 10 year, $350 million contract, Tucker was the second player in MLB history (after Juan Soto) to turn down an offer of $300 million or greater. The race to sign Tucker continued the off-season rivalry between the Blue Jays and Dodgers after both competed to sign Shohei Ohtani in 2023, Teoscar Hernández in 2024, and obtain the rights to Roki Sasaki in early 2025.

Bo Bichette would leave the Blue Jays in the off-season by signing a free-agent contract with the New York Mets. His three-run home run against Ohtani, which seemed like the game-winner until Miguel Rojas' home run in the 9th, was the biggest hit of his Blue Jays career by WPA.

=== 2026 season ===
Blue Jays' closer Jeff Hoffman had an uneven regular season in 2025, but was dominant in the postseason before the home run to Rojas. Early in the 2026 season, Hoffman posted a 7.59 ERA in 10 ⅔ innings, including a blown save on the team's opening day game against the A's, and was demoted as closer. Hoffman would later be traded at the 2026 trade deadline to the Minnesota Twins. Daulton Varsho, who went a combined 0-for-9 in games 6 and 7, while leaving 13 runners on base, was also traded at the deadline to the Houston Astros, as was Game 6 starter Kevin Gausman (to the Chicago Cubs). This was part of a strategy where an underperforming Blue Jays' team in 2026 both sold players with expiring contracts and brought in reinforcements at the trade deadline.

Despite nearly having the same roster which added signings stars like Kazuma Okamoto, Dylan Cease, Cody Ponce (who was injured in his very first start), Toronto missed the postseason due in part to injuries, star slumps, and a drastic loss of offensive production. The Blue Jays finished 79–83, five games behind the Chicago White Sox for the last Wild Card spot. Meanwhile, the Dodgers finished 100–62 to win the NL West for the 13th time in 14 years and advance to the postseason for the 14th consecutive year, tying the record set by the Atlanta Braves from 1991–2005; (Note: This does not count the 1994 season, as the there was a strike and the season was not competed, thus no postseason.) however, their attempt at a three-peat to continue their dynasty was halted after they were swept by the eventual World Series champions Milwaukee Brewers in the NLCS.

== See also ==
- List of Major League Baseball game sevens
- Golden pitch
