= List of Major League Baseball postseason sweeps =

In Major League Baseball (MLB), a sweep refers, depending on the playoff format, to a 4–0, 3–0, or 2–0 series win where one team wins all the games without losing any. The following is a complete list of Major League Baseball postseason sweeps since the World Series began in 1903.

== League Championship Series ==
Between 1969 and 1984, the League Championship Series (LCS) were held in a best-of-five format. Hence, to accomplish a sweep, a team had to win 3–0. Since 1985, the LCS has been held in a best-of-seven format, requiring a team to win 4–0.

Key
*	Team went on to win the World Series

=== American League ===
Year	Winning team	Manager	Losing team	Manager	Ref.
Best-of-five: 1969–1984
1969	Baltimore Orioles	Earl Weaver	Minnesota Twins	Billy Martin	
1970	Baltimore Orioles	Earl Weaver	Minnesota Twins	Bill Rigney	
1971	Baltimore Orioles	Earl Weaver	Oakland Athletics	Dick Williams	
1975	Boston Red Sox	Darrell Johnson	Oakland Athletics	Alvin Dark	
1980	Kansas City Royals	Jim Frey	New York Yankees	Dick Howser	
1984	Detroit Tigers	Sparky Anderson	Kansas City Royals	Dick Howser	
Best-of-seven: 1985–present
1988	Oakland Athletics	Tony La Russa	Boston Red Sox	Joe Morgan	
1990	Oakland Athletics	Tony La Russa	Boston Red Sox	Joe Morgan	
2006	Detroit Tigers	Jim Leyland	Oakland Athletics	Ken Macha	
2012	Detroit Tigers	Jim Leyland	New York Yankees	Joe Girardi	
2014	Kansas City Royals	Ned Yost	Baltimore Orioles	Buck Showalter	
2022	Houston Astros	Dusty Baker	New York Yankees	Aaron Boone	

=== National League ===
Year	Winning team	Manager	Losing team	Manager	Ref.
Best-of-five: 1969–1984
1969	New York Mets	Gil Hodges	Atlanta Braves	Lum Harris	
1970	Cincinnati Reds	Sparky Anderson	Pittsburgh Pirates	Danny Murtaugh	
1975	Cincinnati Reds	Sparky Anderson	Pittsburgh Pirates	Danny Murtaugh	
1976	Cincinnati Reds	Sparky Anderson	Philadelphia Phillies	Danny Ozark	
1979	Pittsburgh Pirates	Chuck Tanner	Cincinnati Reds	John McNamara	
1982	St. Louis Cardinals	Whitey Herzog	Atlanta Braves	Joe Torre	
Best-of-seven: 1985–present
1995	Atlanta Braves	Bobby Cox	Cincinnati Reds	Davey Johnson	
2007	Colorado Rockies	Clint Hurdle	Arizona Diamondbacks	Bob Melvin	
2015	New York Mets	Terry Collins	Chicago Cubs	Joe Maddon	
2019	Washington Nationals	Dave Martinez	St. Louis Cardinals	Mike Shildt	
2025	Los Angeles Dodgers	Dave Roberts	Milwaukee Brewers	Pat Murphy	
2026	Milwaukee Brewers	Pat Murphy	Los Angeles Dodgers	Dave Roberts	

== Division Series ==
The Division Series first took place in 1981, due to the 1981 MLB players' strike dividing the season up into two different halves. Winners of each half of the season played against each other in a best-of-five format. The best-of-five Division Series were reintroduced in 1995, as part of a postseason and divisional realignment.

To complete a sweep in the Division Series, a sweep requires a 3–0 series win.

Key
*	Team went on to win the World Series
*	Team went on to win the pennant, but lose the World Series

=== American League ===
Year	Winning team	Manager	Losing team	Manager	Ref.
1981	Oakland Athletics	Billy Martin	Kansas City Royals	Dick Howser	
1995	Cleveland Indians	Mike Hargrove	Boston Red Sox	Kevin Kennedy	
1998	New York Yankees	Joe Torre	Texas Rangers	Johnny Oates	
1999	New York Yankees	Joe Torre	Texas Rangers	Johnny Oates	
2000	Seattle Mariners	Lou Piniella	Chicago White Sox	Jerry Manuel	
2004	Boston Red Sox	Terry Francona	Anaheim Angels	Mike Scioscia	
2005	Chicago White Sox	Ozzie Guillén	Boston Red Sox	Terry Francona	
2006	Oakland Athletics	Ken Macha	Minnesota Twins	Ron Gardenhire	
2007	Boston Red Sox	Terry Francona	Los Angeles Angels	Mike Scioscia	
2009	New York Yankees	Joe Girardi	Minnesota Twins	Ron Gardenhire	
2009	Los Angeles Angels	Mike Scioscia	Boston Red Sox	Terry Francona	
2010	New York Yankees	Joe Girardi	Minnesota Twins	Ron Gardenhire	
2014	Baltimore Orioles	Buck Showalter	Detroit Tigers	Brad Ausmus	
2014	Kansas City Royals	Ned Yost	Los Angeles Angels	Mike Scioscia	
2016	Cleveland Indians	Terry Francona	Boston Red Sox	John Farrell	
2016	Toronto Blue Jays	John Gibbons	Texas Rangers	Jeff Banister	
2018	Houston Astros	A. J. Hinch	Cleveland Indians	Terry Francona	
2019	New York Yankees	Aaron Boone	Minnesota Twins	Rocco Baldelli	
2022	Houston Astros	Dusty Baker	Seattle Mariners	Scott Servais	
2023	Texas Rangers	Bruce Bochy	Baltimore Orioles	Brandon Hyde	
2026	Tampa Bay Rays	Kevin Cash	New York Yankees	Aaron Boone	

=== National League ===
Year	Winning team	Manager	Losing team	Manager	Ref.
1995	Cincinnati Reds	Davey Johnson	Los Angeles Dodgers	Tommy Lasorda	
1996	Atlanta Braves	Bobby Cox	Los Angeles Dodgers	Bill Russell	
1996	St. Louis Cardinals	Tony La Russa	San Diego Padres	Bruce Bochy	
1997	Atlanta Braves	Bobby Cox	Houston Astros	Larry Dierker	
1997	Florida Marlins	Jim Leyland	San Francisco Giants	Dusty Baker	
1998	Atlanta Braves	Bobby Cox	Chicago Cubs	Jim Riggleman	
2000	St. Louis Cardinals	Tony La Russa	Atlanta Braves	Bobby Cox	
2001	Atlanta Braves	Bobby Cox	Houston Astros	Larry Dierker	
2002	St. Louis Cardinals	Tony La Russa	Arizona Diamondbacks	Bob Brenly	
2005	St. Louis Cardinals	Tony La Russa	San Diego Padres	Bruce Bochy	
2006	New York Mets	Willie Randolph	Los Angeles Dodgers	Jim Tracy	
2007	Colorado Rockies	Clint Hurdle	Philadelphia Phillies	Charlie Manuel	
2007	Arizona Diamondbacks	Bob Melvin	Chicago Cubs	Lou Piniella	
2008	Los Angeles Dodgers	Joe Torre	Chicago Cubs	Lou Piniella	
2009	Los Angeles Dodgers	Joe Torre	St. Louis Cardinals	Tony La Russa	
2010	Philadelphia Phillies	Charlie Manuel	Cincinnati Reds	Dusty Baker	
2017	Los Angeles Dodgers	Dave Roberts	Arizona Diamondbacks	Torey Lovullo	
2018	Milwaukee Brewers	Craig Counsell	Colorado Rockies	Bud Black	
2020	Atlanta Braves	Brian Snitker	Miami Marlins	Don Mattingly	
2020	Los Angeles Dodgers	Dave Roberts	San Diego Padres	Jayce Tingler	
2023	Arizona Diamondbacks	Torey Lovullo	Los Angeles Dodgers	Dave Roberts	

== Wild Card Series ==
After being implemented in the pandemic-shortened 2020 MLB postseason, MLB permanently implemented the Wild Card Series starting 2022, with a best-of-three format. To date, nearly every Wild Card Series held has ended in a sweep, with only 7 of the 24 series going to a Game 3.

Key
*	Team went on to win the World Series
*	Team went on to win the pennant, but lose the World Series

=== American League ===
Year	Winning team	Manager	Losing team	Manager	Ref.
2020	Tampa Bay Rays	Kevin Cash	Toronto Blue Jays	Charlie Montoyo	
2020	Houston Astros	Dusty Baker	Minnesota Twins	Rocco Baldelli	
2020	New York Yankees	Aaron Boone	Cleveland Indians	Sandy Alomar Jr. (Note: In 2020, Alomar was designated as Cleveland's interim manager in lieu of Terry Francona who missed the postseason due to health concerns.)	
2022	Cleveland Guardians	Terry Francona	Tampa Bay Rays	Kevin Cash	
2022	Seattle Mariners	Scott Servais	Toronto Blue Jays	John Schneider	
2023	Minnesota Twins	Rocco Baldelli	Toronto Blue Jays	John Schneider	
2023	Texas Rangers	Bruce Bochy	Tampa Bay Rays	Kevin Cash	
2024	Detroit Tigers	A. J. Hinch	Houston Astros	Joe Espada	
2024	Kansas City Royals	Matt Quatraro	Baltimore Orioles	Brandon Hyde	
2026	Chicago White Sox	Will Venable	Houston Astros	Joe Espada	
2026	New York Yankees	Aaron Boone	Boston Red Sox	Chad Tracy	

=== National League ===
Year	Winning team	Manager	Losing team	Manager	Ref.
2020	Los Angeles Dodgers	Dave Roberts	Milwaukee Brewers	Craig Counsell	
2020	Atlanta Braves	Brian Snitker	Cincinnati Reds	David Bell	
2020	Miami Marlins	Don Mattingly	Chicago Cubs	David Ross	
2022	Philadelphia Phillies	Rob Thomson	St. Louis Cardinals	Oliver Marmol	
2023	Arizona Diamondbacks	Torey Lovullo	Milwaukee Brewers	Craig Counsell	
2023	Philadelphia Phillies	Rob Thomson	Miami Marlins	Skip Schumaker	
2024	San Diego Padres	Mike Shildt	Atlanta Braves	Brian Snitker	
2025	Los Angeles Dodgers	Dave Roberts	Cincinnati Reds	Terry Francona	
2026	San Diego Padres	Craig Stammen	Chicago Cubs	Craig Counsell	

== See also ==
- List of World Series champions
  - List of American League pennant winners
  - List of National League pennant winners
- List of Major League Baseball tie-breakers
- List of Major League Baseball game sevens

Lists of reverse sweeps

- List of teams that have overcome 2–0 series deficits in a best-of-five series
- List of teams that have overcome 3–0 series deficits
