= Roy Campanella Award =

Annual Los Angeles Dodgers award

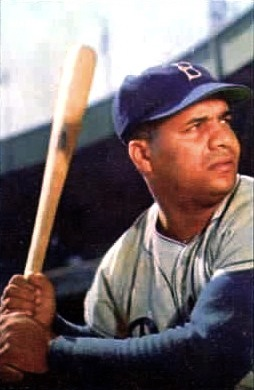
Roy Campanella, the namesake of the award, in about 1953.

The Roy Campanella Award is given annually to the Los Angeles Dodgers player who best exemplifies the spirit and leadership of the late Hall of Fame Brooklyn Dodger catcher, Roy Campanella. The award is voted on by all Los Angeles Dodgers uniformed personnel, players, and coaches. The award has been given out since 2006.

== Winners ==
See footnote

Year	Winner	Position	Ref
2006	Rafael Furcal	Shortstop	
2007	Russell Martin	Catcher	
2008	James Loney	First baseman	
2009	Juan Pierre	Outfielder	
2010	Jamey Carroll	Shortstop	
2011	Matt Kemp	Outfielder	
2012	A.J. Ellis	Catcher	
2013	Clayton Kershaw	Pitcher	
2014	Clayton Kershaw	Pitcher	
2015	Zack Greinke	Pitcher	
2016	Chase Utley	Second baseman	
2017	Justin Turner	Third baseman	
2018	Chase Utley	Second baseman	
2019	Justin Turner	Third baseman	
2020	Justin Turner	Third baseman	
2021	Chris Taylor	Infielder / Outfielder	
2022	Freddie Freeman	First baseman	
2023	Jason Heyward	Outfielder	
2024	Miguel Rojas	Shortstop	
2025	Miguel Rojas	Shortstop	
2026	Miguel Rojas	Shortstop	

== Other team awards for spirit in Major League Baseball ==
- The San Francisco Giants have given the Willie Mac Award since 1980 to "the player on the San Francisco Giants who best exemplifies the spirit and leadership consistently shown by Willie McCovey throughout his long career."
- The Oakland Athletics have given the Catfish Hunter Award since 2004 to the "player whose play on the field and conduct in the clubhouse best exemplifies the courageous, competitive and inspirational spirit demonstrated by the late pitcher, Jim "Catfish" Hunter."

== See also ==
- Awards given to members of specific teams
