= List of Major League Baseball game sevens =

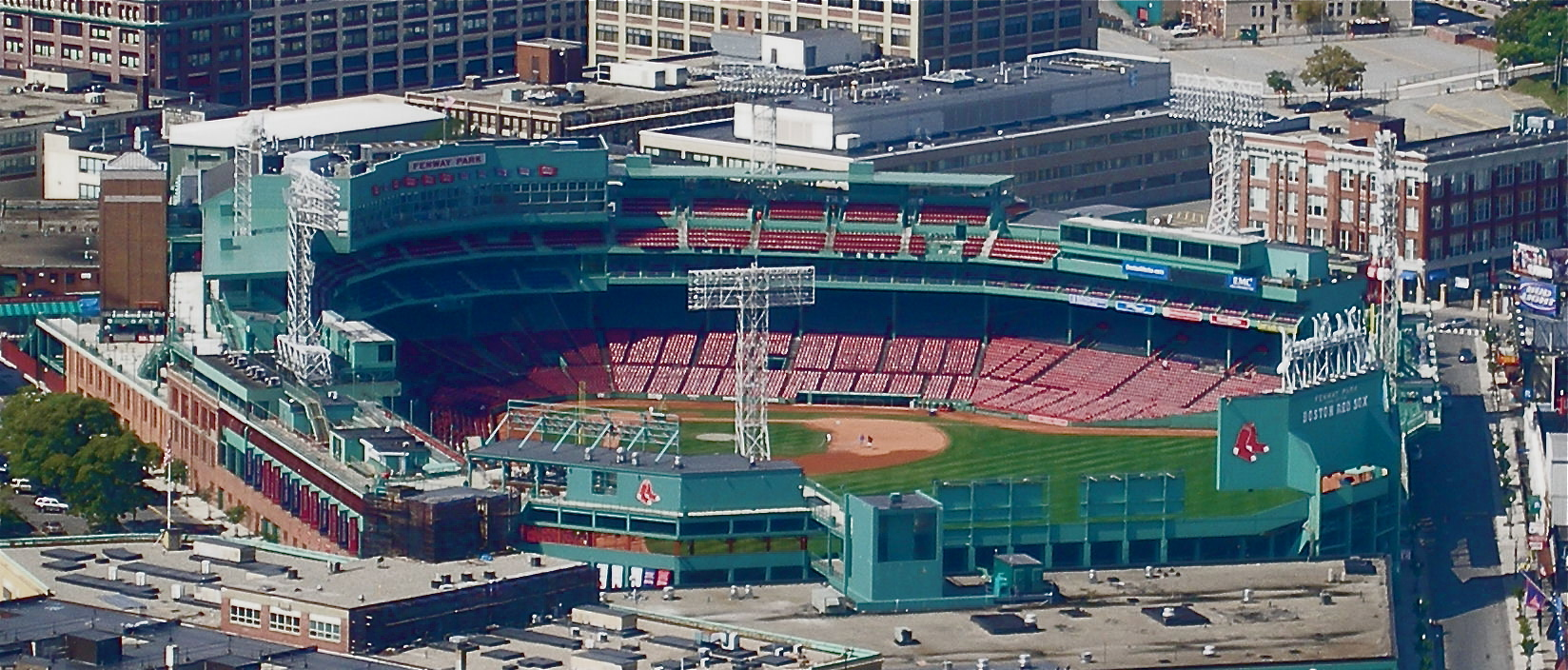
Fenway Park in Boston has hosted five MLB game sevens; three in the World Series and two in the American League Championship Series.

In Major League Baseball (MLB), a game seven can occur in the World Series or in a League Championship Series (LCS), which are contested as best-of-seven series. Based on the playoffs format arrangement, game seven — when necessary — is played in the ballpark of the team holding home-field advantage for the series.

The World Series first employed a best-of-seven format in 1905. That format has been used annually since then, with three exceptions: 1919, 1920, and 1921, which were contested as best-of-nine series. While it was played with the best-of-seven format, the 1912 World Series went to eight games due to one of the earlier games ending in a tie, necessitating a tiebreaker.

The League Championship Series began as best-of-five series, in both the American League and the National League, in 1969. Since the 1985 season, they have used a best-of-seven format.

A game seven cannot occur in earlier rounds of the MLB postseason, as the Division Series (best-of-five) and Wild Card Series (best-of-three) use shorter formats.

== Key ==
| (#) | Extra innings (the number indicates the number of extra innings played) |
| † | Indicates the team that won a game seven after coming back from an 0–3 series deficit |
| § | Indicates the team that lost a game seven after coming back from an 0–3 series deficit |
| Road* | Indicates a game seven that was won by the road team |
| ∞ | Indicates a game seven that was played at a neutral site |
| Year (X) | Indicates the number of game sevens played in that year's World Series or LCS: For the World Series, the link leads to that World Series' article.; For the LCS, the link leads to the article that year's MLB season. |
| Team (#) | Indicates team and the number of game sevens played by that team at that point |

== All-time game sevens ==
=== World Series ===
| Year | Date | Venue | Winner | Result | Loser | Ref. |
|---|---|---|---|---|---|---|
| 1909 | October 16, 1909 | Bennett Park | Pittsburgh Pirates (1) | 8–0 | Detroit Tigers (1) | |
| 1912 | October 16, 1912 | Fenway Park | Boston Red Sox (1) | 3–2 (10) | New York Giants (1) | |
| 1924 | October 10, 1924 | Griffith Stadium | Washington Senators (1) | 4–3 (12) | New York Giants (2) | |
| 1925 | October 15, 1925 | Forbes Field | Pittsburgh Pirates (2) | 9–7 | Washington Senators (2) | |
| 1926 | October 10, 1926 | Yankee Stadium (I) | St. Louis Cardinals (1) | 3–2 | New York Yankees (1) | |
| 1931 | October 10, 1931 | Sportsman's Park (III) | St. Louis Cardinals (2) | 4–2 | Philadelphia Athletics (1) | |
| 1934 | October 9, 1934 | Navin Field | St. Louis Cardinals (3) | 11–0 | Detroit Tigers (2) | |
| 1940 | October 8, 1940 | Crosley Field | Cincinnati Reds (1) | 2–1 | Detroit Tigers (3) | |
| 1945 | October 10, 1945 | Wrigley Field | Detroit Tigers (4) | 9–3 | Chicago Cubs (1) | |
| 1946 | October 15, 1946 | Sportsman's Park (III) | St. Louis Cardinals (4) | 4–3 | Boston Red Sox (2) | |
| 1947 | October 6, 1947 | Yankee Stadium (I) | New York Yankees (2) | 5–2 | Brooklyn Dodgers (1) | |
| 1952 | October 7, 1952 | Ebbets Field | New York Yankees (3) | 4–2 | Brooklyn Dodgers (2) | |
| 1955 | October 4, 1955 | Yankee Stadium (I) | Brooklyn Dodgers (3) | 2–0 | New York Yankees (4) | |
| 1956 | October 10, 1956 | Ebbets Field | New York Yankees (5) | 9–0 | Brooklyn Dodgers (4) | |
| 1957 | October 10, 1957 | Yankee Stadium (I) | Milwaukee Braves (1) | 5–0 | New York Yankees (6) | |
| 1958 | October 9, 1958 | Milwaukee County Stadium | New York Yankees (7) | 6–2 | Milwaukee Braves (2) | |
| 1960 | October 13, 1960 | Forbes Field | Pittsburgh Pirates (3) | 10–9 | New York Yankees (8) | |
| 1962 | October 16, 1962 | Candlestick Park | New York Yankees (9) | 1–0 | San Francisco Giants (3) | |
| 1964 | October 15, 1964 | Busch Stadium (I) | St. Louis Cardinals (5) | 7–5 | New York Yankees (10) | |
| 1965 | October 14, 1965 | Metropolitan Stadium | Los Angeles Dodgers (5) | 2–0 | Minnesota Twins (3) | |
| 1967 | October 12, 1967 | Fenway Park | St. Louis Cardinals (6) | 7–2 | Boston Red Sox (3) | |
| 1968 | October 10, 1968 | Busch Stadium (II) | Detroit Tigers (5) | 4–1 | St. Louis Cardinals (7) | |
| 1971 | October 17, 1971 | Memorial Stadium | Pittsburgh Pirates (4) | 2–1 | Baltimore Orioles (1) | |
| 1972 | October 22, 1972 | Riverfront Stadium | Oakland Athletics (2) | 3–2 | Cincinnati Reds (2) | |
| 1973 | October 21, 1973 | Oakland–Alameda County Coliseum | Oakland Athletics (3) | 5–2 | New York Mets (1) | |
| 1975 | October 22, 1975 | Fenway Park | Cincinnati Reds (3) | 4–3 | Boston Red Sox (4) | |
| 1979 | October 17, 1979 | Memorial Stadium | Pittsburgh Pirates (5) | 4–1 | Baltimore Orioles (2) | |
| 1982 | October 20, 1982 | Busch Stadium (II) | St. Louis Cardinals (8) | 6–3 | Milwaukee Brewers (1) | |
| 1985 | October 27, 1985 | Royals Stadium | Kansas City Royals (2) | 11–0 | St. Louis Cardinals (9) | |
| 1986 | October 27, 1986 | Shea Stadium | New York Mets (2) | 8–5 | Boston Red Sox (6) | |
| 1987 | October 25, 1987 | Hubert H. Humphrey Metrodome | Minnesota Twins (4) | 4–2 | St. Louis Cardinals (11) | |
| 1991 | October 27, 1991 | Hubert H. Humphrey Metrodome | Minnesota Twins (5) | 1–0 (10) | Atlanta Braves (4) | |
| 1997 | October 26, 1997 | Pro Player Stadium | Florida Marlins (1) | 3–2 (11) | Cleveland Indians (1) | |
| 2001 | November 4, 2001 | Bank One Ballpark | Arizona Diamondbacks (1) | 3–2 | New York Yankees (11) | |
| 2002 | October 27, 2002 | Edison International Field | Anaheim Angels (2) | 4–1 | San Francisco Giants (5) | |
| 2011 | October 28, 2011 | Busch Stadium | St. Louis Cardinals (15) | 6–2 | Texas Rangers (1) | |
| 2014 | October 29, 2014 | Kaufmann Stadium | San Francisco Giants (7) | 3–2 | Kansas City Royals (2) | |
| 2016 | November 2, 2016 | Progressive Field | Chicago Cubs (3) | 8–7 (10) | Cleveland Indians (3) | |
| 2017 | November 1, 2017 | Dodger Stadium | Houston Astros (3) | 5–1 | Los Angeles Dodgers (7) | |
| 2019 | October 30, 2019 | Minute Maid Park | Washington Nationals (1) | 6–2 | Houston Astros (4) | |
| 2025 | November 1, 2025 | Rogers Centre | Los Angeles Dodgers (10) | 5–4 (11) | Toronto Blue Jays (3) | |

=== League Championship Series ===
| Year | LCS | Date | Venue | Winner | Result | Loser | Ref. |
|---|---|---|---|---|---|---|---|
| 1985 | ALCS | October 16, 1985 | Exhibition Stadium | Kansas City Royals (1) | 6–2 | Toronto Blue Jays (1) | |
| 1986 | ALCS | October 15, 1986 | Fenway Park | Boston Red Sox (5) | 8–1 | California Angels (1) | |
| 1987 | NLCS | October 14, 1987 | Busch Stadium (II) | St. Louis Cardinals (10) | 6–0 | San Francisco Giants (4) | |
| 1988 | NLCS | October 12, 1988 | Dodger Stadium | Los Angeles Dodgers (6) | 6–0 | New York Mets (3) | |
| 1991 | NLCS | October 17, 1991 | Three Rivers Stadium | Atlanta Braves (3) | 4–0 | Pittsburgh Pirates (6) | |
| 1992 | NLCS | October 14, 1992 | Atlanta–Fulton County Stadium | Atlanta Braves (5) | 3–2 | Pittsburgh Pirates (7) | |
| 1996 | NLCS | October 17, 1996 | Atlanta–Fulton County Stadium | Atlanta Braves (6) | 15–0 | St. Louis Cardinals (12) | |
| 2003 | NLCS | October 15, 2003 | Wrigley Field | Florida Marlins (2) | 9–6 | Chicago Cubs (2) | |
| 2003 | ALCS | October 16, 2003 | Yankee Stadium (I) | New York Yankees (12) | 6–5 (11) | Boston Red Sox (7) | |
| 2004 | ALCS | October 20, 2004 | Yankee Stadium (I) | Boston Red Sox (8)† | 10–3 | New York Yankees (13) | |
| 2004 | NLCS | October 21, 2004 | Busch Stadium (II) | St. Louis Cardinals (13) | 5–2 | Houston Astros (1) | |
| 2006 | NLCS | October 19, 2006 | Shea Stadium | St. Louis Cardinals (14) | 3–1 | New York Mets (4) | |
| 2007 | ALCS | October 21, 2007 | Fenway Park | Boston Red Sox (9) | 11–2 | Cleveland Indians (2) | |
| 2008 | ALCS | October 19, 2008 | Tropicana Field | Tampa Bay Rays (1) | 3–1 | Boston Red Sox (10) | |
| 2012 | NLCS | October 22, 2012 | AT&T Park | San Francisco Giants (6) | 9–0 | St. Louis Cardinals (16) | |
| 2017 | ALCS | October 21, 2017 | Minute Maid Park | Houston Astros (2) | 4–0 | New York Yankees (14) | |
| 2018 | NLCS | October 20, 2018 | Miller Park | Los Angeles Dodgers (8) | 5–1 | Milwaukee Brewers (2) | |
| 2020 (Note: During the 2020 postseason, when neutral sites were used, the team that would normally have home-field advantage was designated as the home team and batted last.) | ALCS | October 17, 2020 | Petco Park ∞ | Tampa Bay Rays (2) | 4–2 | Houston Astros (5)§ | |
| 2020 | NLCS | October 18, 2020 | Globe Life Field ∞ | Los Angeles Dodgers (9) | 4–3 | Atlanta Braves (7) | |
| 2023 | ALCS | October 23, 2023 | Minute Maid Park | Texas Rangers (2) | 11–4 | Houston Astros (6) | |
| 2023 | NLCS | October 24, 2023 | Citizens Bank Park | Arizona Diamondbacks (2) | 4–2 | Philadelphia Phillies (1) | |
| 2025 | ALCS | October 20, 2025 | Rogers Centre | Toronto Blue Jays (2) | 4–3 | Seattle Mariners (1) | |

== All-time standings ==
| Team | Games played | Wins | Losses | Win–loss % |
|---|---|---|---|---|
| St. Louis Cardinals | 16 | 11 | 5 | .688 |
| New York Yankees | 14 | 6 | 8 | .429 |
| Brooklyn / Los Angeles Dodgers | 10 | 6 | 4 | .600 |
| Boston Red Sox | 10 | 4 | 6 | .400 |
| Pittsburgh Pirates | 7 | 5 | 2 | .714 |
| Milwaukee / Atlanta Braves | 7 | 4 | 3 | .571 |
| New York / San Francisco Giants | 7 | 2 | 5 | .286 |
| Houston Astros | 6 | 2 | 4 | .333 |
| Washington Senators / Minnesota Twins | 5 | 3 | 2 | .600 |
| Detroit Tigers | 5 | 2 | 3 | .400 |
| New York Mets | 4 | 1 | 3 | .250 |
| Cincinnati Reds | 3 | 2 | 1 | .667 |
| Kansas City Royals | 3 | 2 | 1 | .667 |
| Philadelphia / Oakland Athletics | 3 | 2 | 1 | .667 |
| Chicago Cubs | 3 | 1 | 2 | .333 |
| Toronto Blue Jays | 3 | 1 | 2 | .333 |
| Cleveland Indians / Guardians | 3 | 0 | 3 | .000 |
| Arizona Diamondbacks | 2 | 2 | 0 | 1.000 |
| Florida / Miami Marlins | 2 | 2 | 0 | 1.000 |
| Tampa Bay Rays | 2 | 2 | 0 | 1.000 |
| California / Anaheim Angels | 2 | 1 | 1 | .500 |
| Texas Rangers | 2 | 1 | 1 | .500 |
| Baltimore Orioles | 2 | 0 | 2 | .000 |
| Milwaukee Brewers | 2 | 0 | 2 | .000 |
| Washington Nationals | 1 | 1 | 0 | 1.000 |
| Philadelphia Phillies | 1 | 0 | 1 | .000 |
| Seattle Mariners | 1 | 0 | 1 | .000 |
Note: Three teams have never played a game seven: Chicago White Sox, San Diego Padres, Colorado Rockies. While the White Sox did play a game seven in the 1919 World Series, it was in a best-of-nine series. Teams that have never played a game seven in a best-of-seven series are excluded. Names of franchises before their relocation are also shown.

== Recurring game seven matchups ==
| Count | Matchup | Record | Years Played |
|---|---|---|---|
| 4 | Brooklyn/ Los Angeles Dodgers vs. New York Yankees | Yankees, 3–1 | 1947, 1952, 1955, 1956 |
| 2 | New York Yankees vs. St. Louis Cardinals | Cardinals, 2–0 | 1926, 1964 |
| 2 | Detroit Tigers vs. St. Louis Cardinals | Tie, 1–1 | 1934, 1968 |
| 2 | Boston Red Sox vs. St. Louis Cardinals | Cardinals, 2–0 | 1946, 1967 |
| 2 | Atlanta/ Milwaukee Braves vs. New York Yankees | Tie, 1–1 | 1957, 1958 |
| 2 | Baltimore Orioles vs. Pittsburgh Pirates | Pirates, 2–0 | 1971, 1979 |
| 2 | San Francisco Giants vs. St. Louis Cardinals | Tie, 1–1 | 1987, 2012 |
| 2 | Atlanta Braves vs. Pittsburgh Pirates | Braves, 2–0 | 1991, 1992 |
| 2 | Boston Red Sox vs. New York Yankees | Tie, 1–1 | 2003, 2004 |

== See also ==
- List of Major League Baseball postseason sweeps
  - List of World Series sweeps
- List of NHL game sevens
- List of NBA game sevens
