= Will Smith (catcher) =

American baseball player (born 1995)

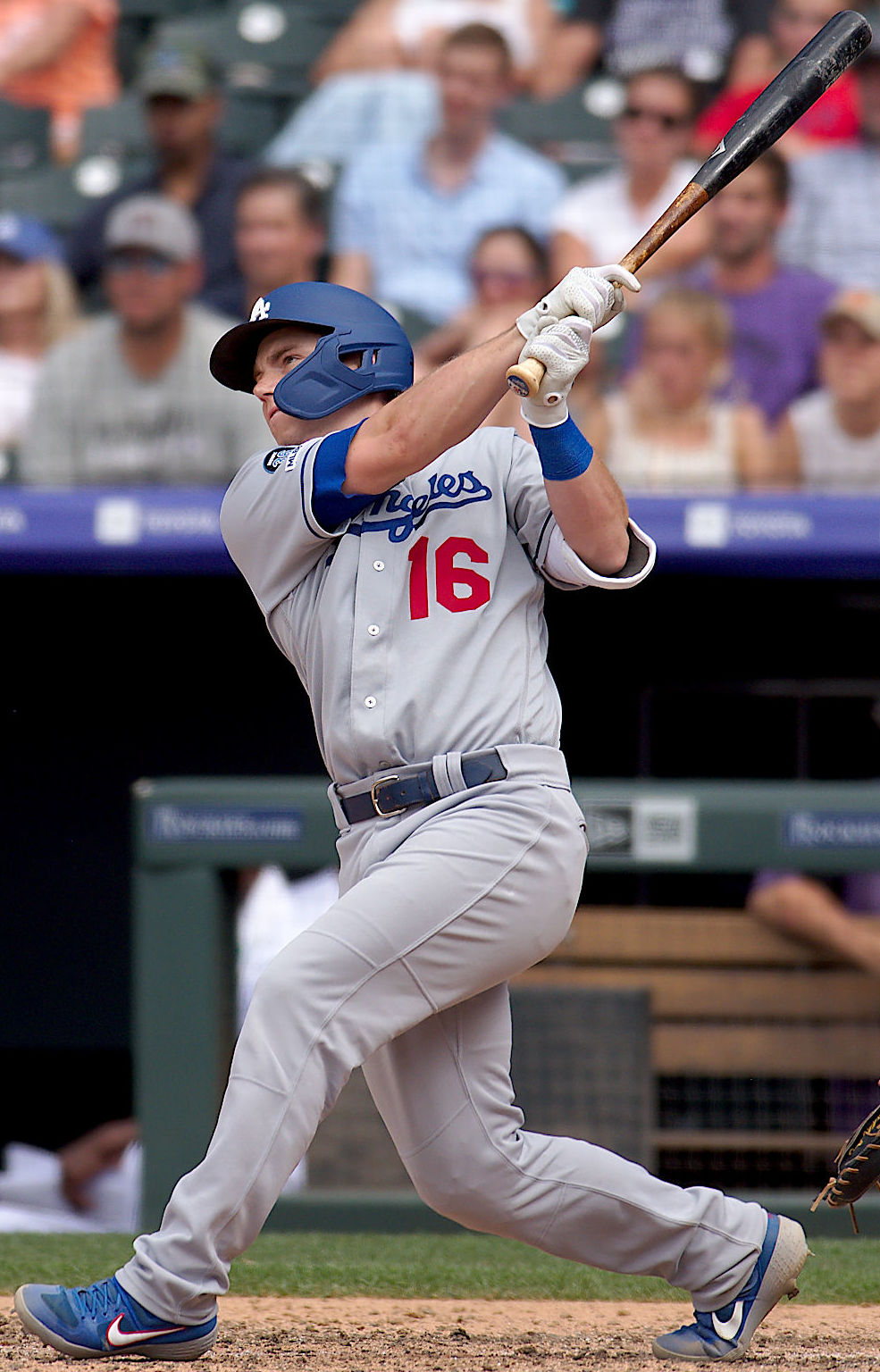
- Smith with the Los Angeles Dodgers in 2019

Los Angeles Dodgers – No. 16
- Catcher
- Born: March 28, 1995 (age 31); Louisville, Kentucky, U.S.
- Bats: Right Throws: Right

MLB debut
- May 28, 2019, for the Los Angeles Dodgers

MLB statistics (through 2026 season)
- Batting average: .263
- Home runs: 138
- Runs batted in: 476
- Stats at Baseball Reference

Teams
- Los Angeles Dodgers (2019–present)

Career highlights and awards
- 3× All-Star (2023–2025); 3× World Series champion (2020, 2024, 2025)
Medals
Men's baseball
Representing United States
World Baseball Classic
Silver medal – second place	2023 Miami	Team
Silver medal – second place	2026 Miami	Team

William Dills Smith (born March 28, 1995) is an American professional baseball catcher for the Los Angeles Dodgers of Major League Baseball (MLB). He played college baseball for the Louisville Cardinals. He was selected by the Dodgers in the first round of the 2016 Major League Baseball draft, and made his MLB debut in 2019. Smith is a three-time All-Star and won the World Series with the Dodgers in 2020, 2024, and 2025, securing the latter championship with an 11th-inning home run in Game 7. Internationally, Smith represents the United States.

== Amateur career ==
Smith attended Kentucky Country Day School in Louisville, Kentucky. In 2013, as a senior, he hit .528 with 11 home runs and 36 RBIs along with pitching to a 7–1 record 0.87 ERA. He went undrafted in the 2013 MLB draft and enrolled at the University of Louisville where he played college baseball. In 2014, he played collegiate summer baseball for the Newport Gulls of New England Collegiate Baseball League where they won the league championship. In 2015, he played collegiate summer baseball with the Brewster Whitecaps of the Cape Cod Baseball League. In 2016, his junior season, he slashed .382/.480/.567 with seven home runs and 43 RBIs in 55 games. After his junior year, he was selected by the Los Angeles Dodgers in the first round of the 2016 Major League Baseball draft. Smith signed on July 17, 2016, for a $1.775 million signing bonus.

== Professional career ==
=== Minor leagues ===
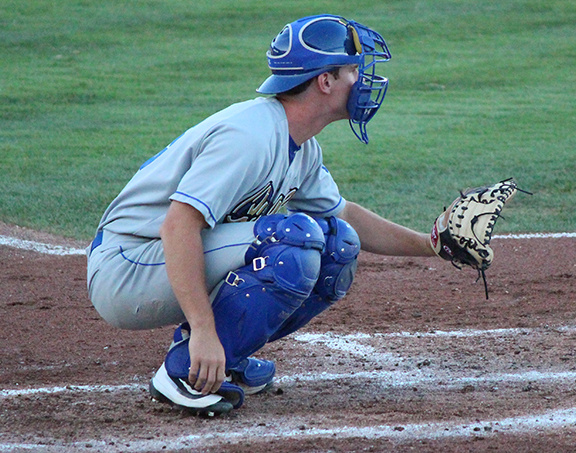
Smith with the Rancho Cucamonga Quakes in 2017

Smith began his professional career with the Ogden Raptors of the Pioneer Baseball League and was then quickly promoted to the Single-A Great Lakes Loons of the Midwest League. He played in seven games for Ogden, 23 for Great Lakes and 25 for the Rancho Cucamonga Quakes of the California League, hitting a combined .246. He was named to the California League mid-season all-star team in 2017. He hit .232 in 72 games for the Quakes with 11 homers and 43 RBI. He was promoted to the Double-A Tulsa Drillers of the Texas League in July, but suffered a fractured hand after getting hit by a pitch in his debut with the Drillers and he spent the rest of the season on the disabled list. He split 2018 between Tulsa and the Triple–A Oklahoma City Dodgers of the Pacific Coast League, hitting .233 with 20 home runs and 59 RBI.

=== Los Angeles Dodgers ===
==== 2019 ====
Smith began 2019 with Oklahoma City but was promoted to the majors for the first time on May 27, 2019. He made his major league debut the following day against the New York Mets and had two hits in four at-bats as the starting catcher. His first major league hit was a single off Steven Matz in the second inning. Smith's first MLB home run was a walk off against Héctor Neris of the Philadelphia Phillies on June 1. On June 23, Smith hit a walk-off three-run home run in the bottom of the ninth inning against the Colorado Rockies. It was the third straight game the Dodgers won on a walk-off home run by a rookie, an MLB record. He returned to the minors for a month and was selected to the Pacific Coast League team at the Triple-A All-Star Game. In 62 total games for Oklahoma City in 2019 he hit .268 with 20 homers and 54 RBI. Smith was recalled to the majors again on July 26 to replace Austin Barnes as the Dodgers primary catcher and the following day hit a homer and two doubles against the Washington Nationals as well as driving in six runs, the most RBI by a Dodger rookie since James Loney in 2006. With 26 RBI and nine homers in his first 23 games, he passed Cody Bellinger for the most in franchise history through that many contests. He finished the 2019 campaign hitting .253/.337/.571 in 54 games with 15 homers and 42 RBI. Smith had only one hit in 13 at-bats against the Nationals in the 2019 National League Division Series (NLDS).

==== 2020 ====
In the pandemic-shortened 2020 season, Smith played in 37 games for the Dodgers and hit .289/.401/.579 with eight home runs and 25 RBI. In the third game of the 2020 NLDS, Smith had five hits against the San Diego Padres, setting a new Dodgers franchise record for most hits in a post-season game. On October 16, during Game 5 of the National League Championship Series (NLCS) Smith became the first MLB player to face a pitcher of the same name in the postseason, Atlanta Braves pitcher Will Smith. The faceoff ended with Smith hitting a three-run home run. In the 2020 World Series against the Tampa Bay Rays, Smith had four hits in 24 at-bats, including a home run in Game 2. He also committed a fielding error that led to the Dodgers losing Game 4. However, they won the series in six games.

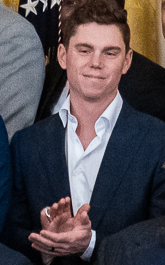
Smith with the Dodgers at the White House in 2021

==== 2021 ====
In his first full season and third overall of his career, Smith played in 130 games for the Dodgers and hit .258/.365/.495 with new career highs of 25 home runs and 76 RBIs. Of his 130 games played, Smith played third base and first base for one game each as well as serving as a pinch runner or designated hitter for 16 games while playing catcher for the remaining 117 games. He led major league catchers in stolen bases allowed. He also led the National League with 11 sacrifice flies. Smith started every game for the Dodgers at catcher in the postseason. He was hitless in three at-bats in the Wild Card Game, had six hits (including two home runs) in 18 at-bats in the 2021 NLDS and had four hits (one home run) in 23 at-bats in the 2021 NLCS.

==== 2022 ====
In 2022, Smith played in 137 games for the Dodgers, which included 109 at catcher and another 25 as the designated hitter. He had a .260 batting average, with 24 home runs and 87 RBIs. He also hit .188 in the 2022 NLDS.

==== 2023 ====
Smith signed a $5.25 million contract with the Dodgers in his first year of salary arbitration. He was selected to his first All-Star game in 2023. On the season, he played in 126 games, batting .261 with 19 homers and 76 RBI. In the 2023 NLDS, Smith had five hits in 12 at-bats (.417 average with a double and a triple.)

==== 2024 ====
Smith began 2024 by agreeing to a $8.55 million contract, a record amount for a catcher in his second season of salary arbitration. Then, on March 27, he signed a 10-year, $140 million contract extension with the Dodgers. He hit his 100th career home run for the Dodgers against the Mets on May 30, becoming the fourth catcher in franchise history to hit 100 home runs alongside Roy Campanella (242), Mike Piazza (177), and Steve Yeager (100). On July 5, he hit three home runs in a game against the Milwaukee Brewers, joining Campanella, Piazza, and Yasmani Grandal as the only Dodger catchers to accomplish that. The following day, he homered in his first at-bat of the game, tying him for the major league record of four home runs in four at-bats, the first Dodger player to do so since Adrián González in 2015. He also became the third catcher in history to accomplish that, joining Johnny Bench (1973) and Benito Santiago (1996). He was selected to the 2024 Major League Baseball All-Star Game, his second such selection. Smith played in 128 games for the Dodgers in 2024, with a career low .248 batting average and with 20 home runs and 75 RBI.

Smith started every game for the Dodgers in the postseason, but hit poorly, with a .125 average in the NLDS, .182 in the NLCS, and .111 in the 2024 World Series. However, he hit one home run in each series and won his second championship with the Dodgers.

==== 2025 ====
On June 18, 2025, Smith hit a pinch-hit walk-off home run off of Padres pitcher Robert Suárez in the bottom of the ninth for a 4–3 Dodgers victory. It was the third pinch-hit walk-off of his career, breaking a tie with Rick Monday for the most in franchise history. Will Smith caught the game where Clayton Kershaw recorded his 3,000 strikeout. On August 31, 2025, during the bottom of the ninth inning, Smith hit a pinch-hit walk-off home run off the Arizona Diamondbacks pitcher John Curtiss. This would become Smith's fourth career walk-off home run, making him hold the second-most pinch-hit home runs in MLB history behind first baseman and designated hitter Jason Giambi with six career walk-off home runs. On September 3, he was hit in the hand by a ball fouled off by Nick Gonzales of the Pittsburgh Pirates and left the game with what was listed as a right hand contusion. Initially they kept him on the roster, and he got into one more game on September 9, but he continued to have pain in his hand and was placed on the injured list on September 11. On September 20, the Dodgers announced that he had a hairline fracture in his hand and would miss the rest of the regular season. He finished the season with a career high .296 batting average, 17 home runs, and 61 RBI in 110 games.

Smith was still recovering from the injury as the postseason started, so the Dodgers carried three catchers for the first two rounds of the playoffs and Ben Rortvedt started at catcher in the Wild Card Series and the first couple of games of the NLDS. Smith returned to the starting lineup in game 3 He had two hits in 13 at-bats in the series. In the four-game sweep of the Milwaukee Brewers in the NLCS, Smith had six hits in 15 at-bats (.400 average).

In the 2025 World Series against the Toronto Blue Jays, Smith homered off Kevin Gausman in the seventh inning of Game 2 to give the Dodgers a lead they never relinquished and he drove in three of the Dodgers five runs in the game. His run scoring double in Game 6 started the scoring in another game the Dodgers won and in Game 7, Smith hit the eventual game-winning home run in the top of the 11th inning off of Blue Jays pitcher Shane Bieber. For the series he batted .267 with the two home runs and six RBI. He also set a new record for most innings caught in a single World Series with two extra inning contests in a seven-game series, won by the Dodgers.

==== 2026 ====
On June 11, 2026, Smith was placed on the injured list due to neck inflammation and did not rejoin the team until September 1. As a result, he played in only 73 games for the Dodgers during the year, his lowest total since his rookie season. Smith batted .260 with 10 home runs and 34 RBI.

== International career ==
On August 29, 2022, Smith announced that he would represent the United States in the 2023 World Baseball Classic, joining fellow Dodger Mookie Betts. He played in three games in the tournament, earning two hits in ten at-bats. He hit a solo home run off of JoJo Romero in a pool stage game against Team Mexico.

== Personal life ==
William Dills Smith was born on March 28, 1995, in Louisville, Kentucky. His parents are Mark and Julie Smith, and he has a younger sister, Sara. He grew up a Red Sox fan, and his favorite players were Jason Varitek, Kevin Youkilis, and David Ortiz.

Smith married Cara Martinell in December 2020 and their first child, a daughter, was born in October 2022.

Smith is nicknamed "The Fresh Prince" after the television show The Fresh Prince of Bel-Air, starring the identically named actor Will Smith. He often requires disambiguation from the pitcher Will Smith.

In 2021, Smith and his wife Cara Smith co-founded the Catching Hope Foundation, a nonprofit organization launched out of their shared roots in Kentucky and aimed at supporting youth communities and education initiatives.
