= Major League Baseball postseason =

Championship tournament following the Major League Baseball regular season

- Current season, competition or edition: 2026 Major League Baseball postseason
- Sport: Baseball
- Founded: 1903
- No. of teams: 12
- Most recent champion: Milwaukee Brewers (1st title)
- Most titles: New York Yankees (27 titles)
- Broadcasters: United States: Fox/FS1; TBS; NBC/NBCSN; International: Broadcasters
- Website: MLB Postseason

The Major League Baseball (MLB) postseason is the annual playoff elimination tournament held to determine the champion of MLB in the United States and Canada. Since 2022, the postseason for each league—American and National—consists of two best-of-three Wild Card Series contested by the lowest-seeded division winner and the three wild card teams, two best-of-five Division Series (LDS) featuring the wild-card winners and the two highest-seeded division winners, and finally the best-of-seven League Championship Series (LCS). The winners of the American League Championship Series (ALCS) and the National League Championship Series (NLCS) play each other in the best-of-seven World Series. The postseason tournament takes place after the conclusion of MLB's regular season and takes approximately one month to complete.

== Format history ==
=== 1903–1968: World Series only (2 team series) ===
Major League Baseball is the oldest of North America's major professional sports organizations, with roots dating back to the 1870s. The final series to determine its champion has been called the "World Series" (originally "World's Championship Series" and then "World's Series") as far back as the National League's contests with the American Association starting at the beginning of the 1880s.

From 1901 to 1968, each league champion, or pennant winner, was the team with the best regular-season win–loss record. In 1903, modern annual postseason play began with a one-round system, in which the American League champion played the National League champion in a best-of-seven series (in 1903, 1919, 1920, and 1921, it was best-of-nine) called the World Series; however, there was no 1904 Series because the National League champion New York Giants refused to play. This single-tiered approach persisted through 1968, even after both leagues expanded in 1961–1962 to ten teams.

=== 1969–1993: Addition of League Championship series (4 team playoff) ===
In 1969, both leagues expanded to 12 teams, complicating the competition for the league championship. Imitating the other major sports' long-standing playoff traditions, MLB split each league into East and West divisions, creating four divisions of six teams each until expansions in 1977 and 1993. This created a new postseason round called the League Championship Series (LCS), in which the East and West division champions of each league played a best-of-five series to determine the league champion. In 1985, the LCS was expanded to a best-of-seven series, which continues today.

Under this system, it was possible for one of the best teams in a league to be left out of the postseason if it failed to win its division. Most notably, in 1993, the Atlanta Braves and San Francisco Giants finished with the two best records in MLB with 104 and 103 wins, respectively. However, since both teams played in the National League West division, the Giants missed the postseason by a single game.

The baseball players' strike of 1981 uniquely—for this era—added another round to the postseason. Because the strike split the season into two roughly equal halves, the division winners of each half of the 1981 season met in a best-of-five Division Series. The winners of the Division Series then progressed to the League Championship Series, with the remainder of the postseason following a similar format to other years in this era.

=== 1994–2011: Addition of Division Series (8 team playoff) ===
In 1994, MLB realigned, adding a Central division to both leagues while retaining the pre-existing East and West divisions. To avoid having a playoff tournament consisting of an odd number of divisional winners, a wild card playoff spot was introduced to each league, imitating the original post-merger NFL system. The wild card berth was given to the team with the best record among the division runners-up. This assured that the team with the second-best record in its league qualified for the postseason even if it did not win its division, avoiding cases such as that of the 1993 San Francisco Giants discussed above. This new format doubled the postseason participants in each league from two to four, and from four teams overall to eight.

The additional teams made another elimination round necessary. This new round became the new first round of the postseason, the best-of-five Division Series. As mentioned above, this term had first been used for the extra round in 1981 required by the "split-season" scheduling anomaly following the midseason baseball players strike; with this playoff expansion, the Division Series became permanent. This format was in place for the 1994 season, but that year's players' strike canceled the postseason. The format was realized on the field in 1995.

Under this format, in the two Division Series, the wild card team played the divisional champion outside its own division that had the better record, with the remaining two teams playing each other in the second Division Series for each league. The two Division Series winners from each league go on to play each other in the League Championship Series. As with the previous postseason format, the winners of each League Championship Series met in the World Series.

=== 2012–2019; 2021: Addition of Single Wild Card Games (10 team playoff) ===
With the adoption of the new collective bargaining agreement in November 2011, baseball commissioner Bud Selig announced that a new playoff system would begin within two years; the change was ultimately put into place in 2012. The format employed a one-game wild-card playoff.

Under this format, a second wild-card team was added to each league, the team with the second-highest win total in each league among non-division winners. The two wild-card teams played in a one-game playoff after the end of the regular season, with the winner advancing to the best-of-five Division Series. As in the previous format, the division champions qualified for the Division Series; however, under the expanded wild-card format, the winner of the Wild Card Game played the division winner with the best record in the Division Series, regardless of whether the two teams were in the same division, while the other two division winners played each other in the other Division Series, with the second-best division winner having home-field advantage. The format for placement in the League Championship Series and World Series remained unchanged.

With this format, it was possible for two teams in the same division to play each other before the League Championship Series.

=== 2020: 16-team playoff (beginning of Wild Card series) ===
During the suspension of the 2020 MLB season due to the COVID-19 pandemic, all proposals put forward during negotiations between MLB and the Major League Baseball Players Association (MLBPA) included a temporarily expanded postseason. The various proposals included 16-team formats and included the 2020 and (in some proposals) 2021 seasons. However, the eventual lack of a negotiated season structure initially resulted in the 2020 season being intended to keep the 10-team format.

On July 23, 2020, MLBPA and the owners agreed to expand to a 16-team playoff structure for the 2020 season. The first round was called the Wild Card Series. The format consisted of eight teams from each league, seeded in the following order: division winners by record (1–3), runner-up teams by record (4–6), and the two best teams remaining (7–8). All games in this format were a best-of-three hosted by the higher seeds. All other series (LDS, LCS, and World Series) remained the same. The WCS pairings were as follows: top seed vs. eighth, second vs. seventh, third vs. sixth, and fourth vs. fifth. The DS had the 1/8 winner play the 4/5 winner, while the 2/7 winner played the 3/6 winner. This format was only used for that particular season as MLB reverted to the previous 10-team setup for the 2021 postseason.

=== 2022–present: 12-team playoff (revised Wild Card series) ===
In the 2022 collective bargaining negotiations, owners and players agreed to a 12-team postseason, with 6 teams per league: the three division winners and three wild card teams.

Seedings for the six teams are as follows:

- Division winners (1, 2, 3)
- Wild-card teams (4, 5, 6)

This new postseason format was implemented starting with the 2022 season. The two division winners with the best record in each league receive byes to the Division Series. The third place division winner is seeded third, and the three wild card teams are each seeded from four to six in order of their regular season record. These three wild card teams along with the third-place division winner then play in the Wild Card Round, a best-of-three-game series in which the third-seeded division winner hosts the sixth-seeded wild card team and the fourth-seeded wild card team hosts the fifth-seeded wild card team for all three games. The tie-breaker game (a.k.a. "Game 163") was also eliminated with playoff spots now determined through tie-breaker formulas.

The tiebreaker criteria, consistent for both seeding and playoff qualification, are as follows, with coin flips (two teams) or draw of lots (at least three teams) if all of those fail:

1. Head-to-head record
2. Intra-division record
3. Inter-division record
4. Record in last half of intra-league games

If the tie cannot be broken through these means, the last tiebreaker is expanded to include the game before the last half of intra-league games, then two games before, continuing in this pattern until the tie is resolved, provided that such additional game was not between any of the tied Clubs.

The brackets remain fixed, with no re-seeding. In the Division Series, the 1 seed plays the 4/5 winner, while the 2 seed plays the 3/6 winner.

== Home-field advantage ==
=== World Series ===
The World Series used several different formats in its early years. Initially, it generally followed an alternating home-and-away pattern, except that if a seventh game was possible, its site was determined by coin toss prior to the sixth game. In 1924, the World Series began using a 2-3-2 format, presumably to save on travel costs, a pattern that has continued to this day with the exception of a couple of the World War II years when wartime travel restrictions compelled a 3-4 format (used in 1943 and 1945, but not in the 1944 series, which was contested between crosstown rivals the St. Louis Browns and St. Louis Cardinals; all games were held in the same stadium in St. Louis). From the start of the 2-3-2 format through the 2002 season, home-field advantage generally alternated between leagues each year. Prior to the 1994 strike, the National League champion received home-field advantage in even-numbered years and the American League champion in odd-numbered years; these were reversed for 1995–2002 (because 1994 would have been the NL's turn to have home-field, but the World Series was canceled by the aforementioned strike). This changed in 2003.

The 2002 All-Star Game ended in a tie, much to the displeasure of both fans and sportswriters, who complained about a lack of intensity and competitiveness on the part of the players. This hit especially close to home for Commissioner Bud Selig, as the game had been played in his home city of Milwaukee, Wisconsin. In response, to make the game's outcome more meaningful, in 2003, MLB began assigning home-field advantage in the World Series to the winner of that year's All-Star Game, which is typically held in mid-July.

Following the acceptance of a new collective bargaining agreement after the 2016 season (which went into effect in 2017) home-field advantage in the World Series is no longer tied to the outcome of the All-Star Game, but instead is granted to the team with the better regular-season record. One exception was 2020, when all World Series games were played at a neutral site. The home-field advantage in the World Series (i.e., the home team for games 1, 2, 6, and 7) was granted to the pennant winner with the higher seed in its league, not necessarily the team with the better regular season record. If both pennant winners had the same seed, their regular season records decided the result.

Home-field advantage can also work against a team. In recent seasons, home-field advantage has not decided World Series games: Between 2014 and 2021, and again since 2023, the home team did not win the deciding game of a World Series on their own home field, although the 2020 edition, played on a neutral site due to the COVID-19 pandemic, was won by the designated home team (that is, the team that batted second), the Los Angeles Dodgers, so technically speaking it was the first Series won by the home team since 2013. The 2022 edition was won in six games by the eventual designated home team, the Houston Astros, making them the first such team since 2013 to actually win the deciding game of a World Series on their own home field, in this case Minute Maid Park. The following year, the Texas Rangers won the 2023 Series at Chase Field, home of their opponents, the Arizona Diamondbacks, which held the home-field advantage for that Series. Then in 2024, the Los Angeles Dodgers won the World Series on the road at Yankee Stadium, home of their opponents, the New York Yankees, which held the home-field advantage for Game 5. In 2025, despite the Toronto Blue Jays taking a 3-2 series lead back to Rogers Centre, the Dodgers secured narrow wins in both Games 6 and 7 to secure their second straight championship on the road. The 2025 Blue Jays became the fifth consecutive team to lose Game 7 of the World Series at home, following the 2014 Kansas City Royals, 2016 Cleveland Indians, 2017 Los Angeles Dodgers, and 2019 Houston Astros; the most recent team to win a World Series Game 7 at home remains the 2011 St. Louis Cardinals.

=== League Championship Series ===
Until 1998, the LCS alternated home-field advantage with a 2–3 format in the best-of-5 era (1969–1984) and a 2–3–2 format when it went to best-of-7 (1985–present). Since 1998, the team with the better record has had home field advantage, but a wild card team never secures the extra home game, regardless of regular-season records, unless both teams in the League Championship Series are wild cards (starting in 2022).

=== Division Series ===
Until 1997, the Division Series rotated in which one of the three division-winning teams did not have home-field advantage, with the wild card team never having it. From 1998 to 2021, the two division winners with the best records in each league had home-field while the worst-ranked division winner and wild-card team (the winner of the Wild Card Game) did not. Since 2022, the two division winners with the best records in each league have had home-field advantage over the two wild card series winners. The Division Series used a 2–3 format until 1998 and now uses a 2–2–1 format. This is seen as a fairer distribution of home-field advantage because previously under the 2–3 format, the team hosting the first two games had absolutely no chance of winning the series at home. With the current 2–2–1 format, however, both teams have the home-field advantage in a sense. While one team gets to host three games (including the critical first and last game), the other team does get two chances out of three (games 3 and 4) of winning the series on its home field.

With the adoption of the expanded playoff format in 2012, the five-game Division Series began with two home games for the lower seeds, followed by up to three home games for the higher seeds. This one-year change eliminated a travel day prior to a decisive Game 5 of a Division Series and was necessary because the 2012 regular-season schedule was announced before the agreement on the new postseason was reached. Since 2013, the Division Series restored the 2–2–1 format.

=== Wild Card Round ===
Before 2012, the Wild Card team played the team with the best record that was not from their division. With the addition of a second Wild Card team, the Wild Card Game, a one-game playoff between the 4/5 seeds, was created. In this round, the 4th-seed (1st Wild Card) hosts the 5th-seed (2nd Wild Card), with the winner advancing to the next round of the playoffs to take on the best division winner in their respective league (regardless whether or not the teams are in the same division). This has caused some controversy in that some people want a three-game series to determine a winner instead of an elimination game to make the playoffs more fair. The 2020 implementation of the Wild Card Series had all three games hosted at the higher seed, to reduce travel, and to reward regular season performance. The 2020 format was used again starting in 2022, but with the top two division winners receiving a bye to the Division Series, and the remaining four teams playing in this round. In this case, the third seed (lowest-seeded division winner) hosts the sixth seed (third Wild Card team), and the fourth seed (top Wild Card team) hosts the fifth seed (second Wild Card team).

== Postseason bonuses ==
There are three factors that determine the actual amount of bonus money paid to any individual player: (1) the size of the bonus pool; (2) their team's success in the season/post-season; and (3) the share of the pool assigned to the individual player.

=== Bonus pool size ===
There is a separate pool for each series – the Wild Card games, the Division Series, the League Championship Series, and the World Series. The players' bonus pool is funded with 60% of the gate receipts for each of the Wild Card games, the first three games of each Division Series, the first four games of each LCS and the first four games of the World Series; limiting the funding for the pool to these games, the minimum number in each series, removes incentive to extend the series for merely fiscal sake. The value of the gate is determined by the size of the venues, the amount of high-priced premium seating in the venues, the number of games played in the series and whether the games sell out. Ticket prices for each series are set by MLB, not the home teams, so they are relatively uniform across baseball.

=== Awarding of bonus money ===
Since 2022, the World Series winner gets 36%, the World Series runner-up, 24%, two League Championship Series losers, 12% each, the four Division Series losers, 3.25% each, and the four Wild Card playoff losers 0.75% each. In 2020, the eight Wild Card Series losers got 0.375% each.

The division of the team's share of the pool is voted upon by the players who have been on the team during the entire regular season, in a meeting chaired by their union representative. This meeting follows the trade deadline on July 31. Players who have been with the team for the full season automatically receive a full share. At the meeting, the full-season players vote on whether anyone else—including players who have not been with the team for the full season, coaches, and trainers—is to be granted a full share, less than a full share, a cash award, or no share. After the World Series, the pool of money is split according to the shares determined in the vote. There is no limit to the number of shares that may be granted, but a greater number of shares dilutes the value of each share, and consequently the amount each player is awarded.

As an example, playoff-pool full-share holders for the St. Louis Cardinals received US$362,183.97 (equivalent to $578,430 in 2025) each when the team won the World Series in 2006.

== See also ==
- Babe Ruth Award – Awarded to the best player in the postseason since 2007
- List of Major League Baseball postseason records
- MLB division winners – List of division champions in Major League Baseball
- Nippon Professional Baseball playoffs – Japanese baseball competition
