= Win probability added =

Sport statistic representing player's contribution

Win probability added (WPA) is a sport statistic which attempts to measure a player's contribution to a win by figuring the factor by which each specific play made by that player has altered the outcome of a game. It is used for baseball and American football.

== Explanation ==
Some form of win probability has been around for about 40 years; however, until computer use became widespread, win probability added was often difficult to derive, or imprecise. With the aid of Retrosheet, however, win probability added has become substantially easier to calculate. The win probability for a specific situation in baseball (including the inning, number of outs, men on base, and score) is obtained by first finding all the teams that have encountered this situation. Then the winning percentage of these teams in these situations is found. This probability figure is then adjusted for home-field advantage. Thus win probability added is the difference between the win probability when the player came to bat and the win probability when the play ended.

== Win probability and win shares ==
Some people confuse win probability added with win shares, since both are baseball statistics that attempt to measure a player's win contribution. However, they are quite different. In win shares, a player with 0 win shares has contributed nothing to his team; in win probability added, a player with 0 win probability added points is average. Also, win shares would give the same amount of credit to a player if he hit a lead-off solo home run as if he hit a walk-off solo home run; WPA, however, would give vastly more credit to the player who hit the walk-off homer.

== Baseball ==
=== MLB postseason ===
In Game 6 of the 2011 World Series, St. Louis Cardinals' third-baseman David Freese posted the best WPA in Major League Baseball postseason history, with a 0.969, which was 0.099 better than the now-second-best WPA of .870, posted by the Los Angeles Dodgers' Kirk Gibson in Game 1 of the 1988 World Series. The third- and fourth-best WPAs are .854 (by the San Diego Padres' Steve Garvey in Game 4 of the 1984 National League Championship Series) and 0.832 (by the Cardinals' Lance Berkman in Game 6 of the 2011 World Series).

== Calculation (Baseball) ==
WPA can be calculated with a win expectancy matrix, where each cell is the probability the Home team wins the game given the current game state, (inning, base/out state, home team runs - away team runs). Since each cell is a probability value, the probability that the away team wins is in that state is 1 - the win expectancy. The WPA for plate appearance is the different between the win expectancy of the new state - the win expectancy of the initial state. Its additive inverse is attributed to the pitcher.

$WPA(PA) = WE(\text{Post-PA State}) - WE(\text{Initial State})$

For example, this is the bottom of the 8th with no outs win expectancy matrix for 2010-2015:

Win Expectancy Based on 2010-2015 Run Expectancy (Perspective of Home team)
| Top/Bot | Outs | Runners | -5 | -4 | -3 | -2 | -1 | Tie | +1 | +2 | +3 | +4 | +5 |
|---|---|---|---|---|---|---|---|---|---|---|---|---|---|
| Bottom | 0 | Empty | 0.018 | 0.039 | 0.079 | 0.156 | 0.297 | 0.605 | 0.871 | 0.942 | 0.975 | 0.989 | 0.996 |
| Bottom | 0 | 1B only | 0.033 | 0.066 | 0.127 | 0.234 | 0.395 | 0.669 | 0.890 | 0.951 | 0.979 | 0.991 | 0.996 |
| Bottom | 0 | 2B only | 0.037 | 0.074 | 0.142 | 0.263 | 0.471 | 0.739 | 0.909 | 0.959 | 0.983 | 0.993 | 0.997 |
| Bottom | 0 | 1B & 2B | 0.062 | 0.118 | 0.213 | 0.350 | 0.526 | 0.754 | 0.916 | 0.963 | 0.984 | 0.993 | 0.997 |
| Bottom | 0 | 3B only | 0.039 | 0.078 | 0.155 | 0.291 | 0.557 | 0.819 | 0.929 | 0.969 | 0.987 | 0.995 | 0.998 |
| Bottom | 0 | 1B & 3B | 0.072 | 0.134 | 0.240 | 0.394 | 0.627 | 0.844 | 0.940 | 0.974 | 0.989 | 0.995 | 0.998 |
| Bottom | 0 | 2B & 3B | 0.078 | 0.147 | 0.263 | 0.455 | 0.682 | 0.857 | 0.946 | 0.976 | 0.990 | 0.996 | 0.998 |
| Bottom | 0 | Loaded | 0.119 | 0.213 | 0.345 | 0.510 | 0.704 | 0.868 | 0.950 | 0.978 | 0.991 | 0.996 | 0.998 |

Let the initial state be bottom of the 8th with no outs, runners on 1B&2B, and the home team is down by 2 runs. In this state, the home team has a win expectancy of .350 per the matrix. If the next batter hits a home run, the game transitions to the post-PA state bottom of the 8th, no outs, empty bases, and the home team is up by 1. This state has a win expectancy of .871.

Therefore, the WPA for this plate appearance attributed to the batter is,

$WPA(Hr|\text{Initial State}) = .871 - .350 = .521$

And the pitcher's WPA will be inversely deducted .521.

A player's WPA for a season is the summation of the WPA for all their plate appearances.
