= UGL =

UGL may refer to:

- UGL (company), an Australian engineering company
  - UGL Rail, its rolling stock division
- David Adamany Undergraduate Library, at Wayne State University in Detroit, Michigan
- Gellan tetrasaccharide unsaturated glucuronyl hydrolase, an enzyme
- General Labour Union (Italy) (Italian: Unione Generale del Lavoro)
- Underslung grenade launcher
- Union Glacier Blue-Ice Runway, in Antarctica
- Unsaturated chondroitin disaccharide hydrolase, an enzyme
