= Unsaturated glucuronyl hydrolase =

Unsaturated glucuronyl hydrolase may refer to:

- Gellan tetrasaccharide unsaturated glucuronyl hydrolase, an enzyme
- Unsaturated chondroitin disaccharide hydrolase, an enzyme
