= 2026 Wayne State University Board of Governors election =

- November 3, 2026

2 of 8 seats on the Wayne State University Board of Governors 5 seats needed for a majority
	First party	Second party
Party	Democratic	Republican
Seats before	5	3
Seats after	5	3
Seat change	Steady	Steady

The 2026 Wayne State University Board of Governors election was held on November 3, 2026, to elect two of eight members to the Wayne State University Board of Governors. Parties nominate candidates through conventions instead of in primary elections. Candidates are elected through plurality block voting.

== Democratic convention ==
=== Candidates ===
==== Nominees ====
- Shereef Akeel, civil rights attorney
- Richard Mack, attorney

==== Eliminated at convention ====
- Nazmul Hassan, vice chair of the Michigan Democratic Party (previously ran for U.S. House)
- Jeremiah Wheeler, activist

==== Declined ====
- Bryan Barnhill, incumbent governor (2019–present)
- Anil Kumar, incumbent governor (2019–present) (ran for U.S. House)

=== Endorsements ===
Shereef Akeel

Organizations

- Michigan Association for Justice

Political parties

- Michigan Democratic Party
Richard Mack

Political parties

- Michigan Democratic Party

== Republican convention ==
=== Candidates ===
==== Nominees ====
- Andy Anuzis, high school principal
- Christa Murphy, businesswoman and nominee for governor in 2022

=== Endorsements ===
Andy Anuzis

Political parties

- Michigan Republican Party
Christa Murphy

Political parties

- Michigan Republican Party

== Third-party candidates ==
=== Libertarian Party ===
==== Nominees ====
- Alex Avery, perennial candidate
- Jami Van Alstine, 2020 nominee for Wayne County Commission's 11th district

=== Green Party ===
==== Nominee ====
- Paul Ragan

=== U.S. Taxpayers Party ===
==== Nominee ====
- Jeff McDonald

=== Natural Law Party ===
==== Nominee ====
- Kathleen Oakford, perennial candidate

=== Working Class Party ===
==== Nominee ====
- Suzanne Roehrig, 2024 nominee for governor

== General election ==
=== Results ===
2026 Wayne State University Board of Governors election results (vote for not more than 2)
Party	Candidate	Votes	%
Democratic	Richard Mack	2,290,088	26.27
Democratic	Shereef Akeel	2,236,842	25.66
Republican	Christa Murphy	1,961,839	22.50
Republican	Andy Anuzis	1,879,775	21.56
Working Class	Suzanne Roehrig	95,876	1.10
Libertarian	Alex Avery	75,615	0.87
Libertarian	Jami Van Alstine	57,850	0.66
U.S. Taxpayers	Jeff McDonald	56,769	0.65
Green	Paul Ragan	36,193	0.42
Natural Law	Kathleen Oakford	27,044	0.31
Total votes		8,717,891	100.0
Democratic hold			
Democratic hold			
