= Peter J. Liacouras =

American academic administrator

7th President of Temple University
- In office July 1, 1982 – August 1, 2000
- Preceded by: Marvin Wachman
- Succeeded by: David Adamany

Personal details
- Born: April 9, 1931 Yeadon, Pennsylvania, U.S.
- Died: May 12, 2016 (aged 85) Philadelphia, Pennsylvania, U.S.
- Spouse: Ann Myers (m. 1959)
- Education: Drexel University (BA); University of Pennsylvania Law School (JD); Tufts University (MA); Harvard Law School (LLM)

Peter James Liacouras (April 9, 1931 – May 12, 2016) was an American academic administrator and lawyer who served as the President of Temple University from 1982 to 2000.

== Early life ==
Liacouras grew up in Yeadon, Pennsylvania and graduated from Yeadon High School before attending Drexel University.

== Temple University ==
Liacouras became the Dean of the Temple University School of Law in 1972 and served in that position until 1982, when he became the President of Temple University. He served in that position until his retirement in 2000, at which point he became the university's Chancellor.

During his presidency, the university developed into a Carnegie I classification institution, expanded its academic programs globally, and saw growth in undergraduate enrollment and considerable infrastructure development.

Liacouras's tenure was marked by substantial focus on urban economic and social development. Seeking to capitalize on the University's location in North Philadelphia, Liacouras sought to market a vision of Temple as the quintessential working class university that would also increasingly appeal to working class suburbanites from the greater Philadelphia area. He employed creative marketing strategies—notably, a marketing campaign with a tagline of "we could have gone anywhere—we chose Temple", and featuring alumnus and Philadelphia native Bill Cosby.

He was succeeded in 2000 by David Adamany, the former President of Wayne State University.

=== Temple Town ===
Liacouras also sought to impart an urban planning vision for Temple University in a concept he called "Temple Town". He invested considerable effort into redeveloping the University's main campus, with the development of on-campus housing at both sides of the campus, planning for new classroom and laboratory facilities to replace antiquated facilities, and the construction of an arena on campus on adjacent land sold to the University by the car dealership that previously occupied the space. The arena, originally named "The Apollo of Temple" (a pun on the Temple of Apollo, as well as a reference to the Apollo Theater in Harlem), was later renamed the Liacouras Center in his honor. The arena houses the intercollegiate basketball teams of the University and other athletics facilities, but a main focal point for its development was the desire of Liacouras to have academic convocations on-campus.

The planning vision to inculcate local businesses along a stretch of the inner main campus was not successfully achieved until after his tenure. He failed to convince local lawmakers to relocate the local regional rail station closer to Temple's campus. The "Temple Town" concept was sometimes criticized as an effort to insulate the University's main campus from the surrounding neighborhood; his efforts to promote student morale by having painted messages on wood structures covering decrepit infrastructure adjacent to the University's gateway were sometimes ridiculed.

His planning vision extended to the development of academic programs globally, with programs now located in London, Rome, Tel Aviv, Ghana, Seoul, and Beijing.

Liacouras's planning also led to the development of a new Temple University Hospital facility on the University's Hospital campus (serving Allied Health Professions, Medicine, Podiatric Medicine, and Dentistry programs), and expansion of the Hospital as a business with satellite locations around the metropolitan Philadelphia area.

=== Labor relations ===
Liacouras's tenure was marked by contentious relationships with the university's dozen labor unions. In an unprecedented move, the faculty union struck twice in the mid-1980s and early 1990s, with an AAUP censure placed against the institution. Other labor unions representing various levels of staff also engaged in strike actions during his tenure.

=== Intercollegiate athletics ===
Liacouras was notable for his strong support of football and basketball, but the university ultimately stopped sponsoring other sports during his tenure. He saw this as part of his strongly held beliefs in urban social and economic development, and a vehicle for successful marketing of the University.

His hiring of John Chaney as head basketball coach—an outspoken critic of the NCAA and advocate for access to higher education—led to many NCAA Tournament appearances for Temple's men's basketball team.

Temple's football team was less successful during Liacouras's tenure. He was pilloried for making comments about wanting to see Temple's football team in the Sugar Bowl by the mid-1980s. The program's greatest success during this period came under coach Bruce Arians, whom Liacouras hired from Bear Bryant's staff at the University of Alabama, in the early to mid-1980s. Minor success was had for a year under coach Jerry Berndt (hired from the University of Pennsylvania).

After the 1990s, the football team was considered non-competitive, and was eventually kicked out of the Big East football conference. Critics assailed Liacouras' for his support of football as embarrassing to the University (for the lack of consistent success on the field, even if some players wound up as successful NFL players) and a drain on University resources that could be invested into academic facilities.

== Personal life ==
=== Political activity ===
Liacouras was active in Philadelphia politics, typically supportive of local Democratic Party leaders. His administration frequently included people in executive and staff positions that drew from local and state political circles. However, he did not enjoy a good relationship with the district city councilman that represented the Temple main campus area, John F. Street. Street would eventually be elected Mayor of Philadelphia, and used that office to hold up development of the Liacouras Center until concessions were made for local business incubation.

Liacouras unsuccessfully ran for the Democratic nomination for the US Senate in 1980.

Liacouras is a member of the Academy of Athens.

Academic offices
Preceded by Ralph Norvell	Dean of the Temple University School of Law; 1972–1982	Succeeded by Carl Singley
Preceded by Marvin Wachman	President of Temple University; 1982–2000	Succeeded by David Adamany
