= Pamela Trotman Reid =

Developmental Psychologist, Professor, and President Emerita

- Born: New York State, U.S.
- Education: Howard University, Temple University, and University of Pennsylvania
- Occupation: Psychologist

Pamela Trotman Reid is an American developmental psychologist, former professor, and president emerita of the University of Saint Joseph.

== Biography ==
Pamela Trotman Reid grew up in Brooklyn and Queens, New York. She has said what she loved most when she was a child was reading and science. She is married to her college boyfriend, Irvin Reid, whom she met at Howard University when they were taking psychology classes together during her freshman year and his first year of graduate school. The couple later set up an endowment for the school's psychology department.

Somewhat separate from her academic work, Reid has been an active member of the Hartford, Connecticut community. She has served on many boards, has chaired executive committees on education, and was appointed to the Capital Region Development Authority by Former Governor Dannel Malloy.

== Education ==
Reid attended Howard University where she received her B.S. She was also in the Howard Chapter of Phi Beta Kappa society. She then got her M.A. from Temple University and her PhD from the University of Pennsylvania. She is a Senior Scholar for the Merrill Palmer Skillman Institute for Child and Family Development at Wayne State University, where her husband served as the institution's first Black president.

== Academic work and research ==
From 1999 to 2004 she worked at the University of Michigan as a professor of psychology, a professor of education, and as the Director of the Women's Studies Program. She also served as a professor at City University of New York, Howard University, Drexel University, the University of Pennsylvania, the University of Tennessee-Chattanooga, the College of New Jersey, and Philadelphia Community College.

In addition to her work as a professor, Reid has held administrative positions at several institutions, including the University of Tennessee-Chattanooga, City University of New York, and Roosevelt University. Like her husband she also became the first African American President of a university when she was appointed president of the University of St. Joseph in Connecticut in 2008. She served there until her retirement in 2014. In her time as president she launched the university's School of Pharmacy, guided the transition from college to university, started programs for the Doctor of Nursing Practice and the Master of Social Work. During her leadership her university established student exchange programs with others in Japan, Oman, and Israel.

Reid initiated a math and technology enrichment program for middle school girls at Wayne State University called Gaining Options: Girls Investigate Real Life (GO-GIRL). The program, which concluded in 2018, guided girls from grades seven through twelve to explore the field of STEM to help prepare them for high school.

She is also active within the American Psychological Association. Reid is a fellow at the APA and served as the first African American president of the Society for the Psychology of Women. Informed in part by her work for the Society for the Psychology of Women, Reid is regarded for her research generally surrounding gender and racial socialization.

== Selected awards ==
- Distinguished 100 Women in Psychology from the APA Division of Psychology of Women (1992)
- Distinguished Career-Contributions to Research Award from the Society for the Psychological Study of Race, Ethnicity and Culture (2000)
- Distinguished Service Award from the Society for the Psychological Study of Social Issues (2008)
- 100 Most Influential Blacks in the State of Connecticut at the NAACP Connecticut State Conference (2009)

== Selected publications ==
- Reid, P. T., & Comas-Diaz, L. (1990). Gender and ethnicity: Perspectives on dual status. Sex roles, 22(7), 397–408.
- Reid, P. T. (1993). Poor women in psychological research: Shut up and shut out. Psychology of Women Quarterly, 17(2), 133–150.
- Reid, P. T. (1988). Racism and sexism. In Eliminating racism (pp. 203–221). Springer, Boston, MA.
- Reid, P. T., & Trotter, K. H. (1993). Children's self-presentations with infants: Gender and ethnic comparisons. Sex Roles, 29(3-4), 171–181.
- Mahalingam, R., & Reid, P. T. (May 2007). Dialogue at the margins: Women's self-stories and the intersection of identities. In Women's studies international forum (Vol. 30, No. 3, pp. 254–263). Pergamon.
