= Ann Weaver Hart =

American college president

21st President of The University of Arizona
- In office July 9, 2012 – May 31, 2017
- Preceded by: Eugene G. Sander
- Succeeded by: Robert C. Robbins

9th president of the Temple University
- In office July 1, 2006 – June 30, 2012
- Preceded by: David Adamany
- Succeeded by: Neil Theobald

18th president of the University of New Hampshire
- In office July 1, 2002 – June 29, 2006
- Preceded by: Joan Leitzel
- Succeeded by: Mark W. Huddleston; Bonnie Newman (interim)

Personal details
- Born: 1948 (age 77–78)

Academic background
- Education: University of Utah (BS, MA, PhD)
- Thesis: An exploration of the effects of superintendents on the instructional performance of school districts (accountability; California) (1983)
- Doctoral advisor: Rodney T. Ogawa

Academic work
- Discipline: Education
- Institutions: University of Utah; Claremont Graduate University; University of New Hampshire; Temple University; The University of Arizona

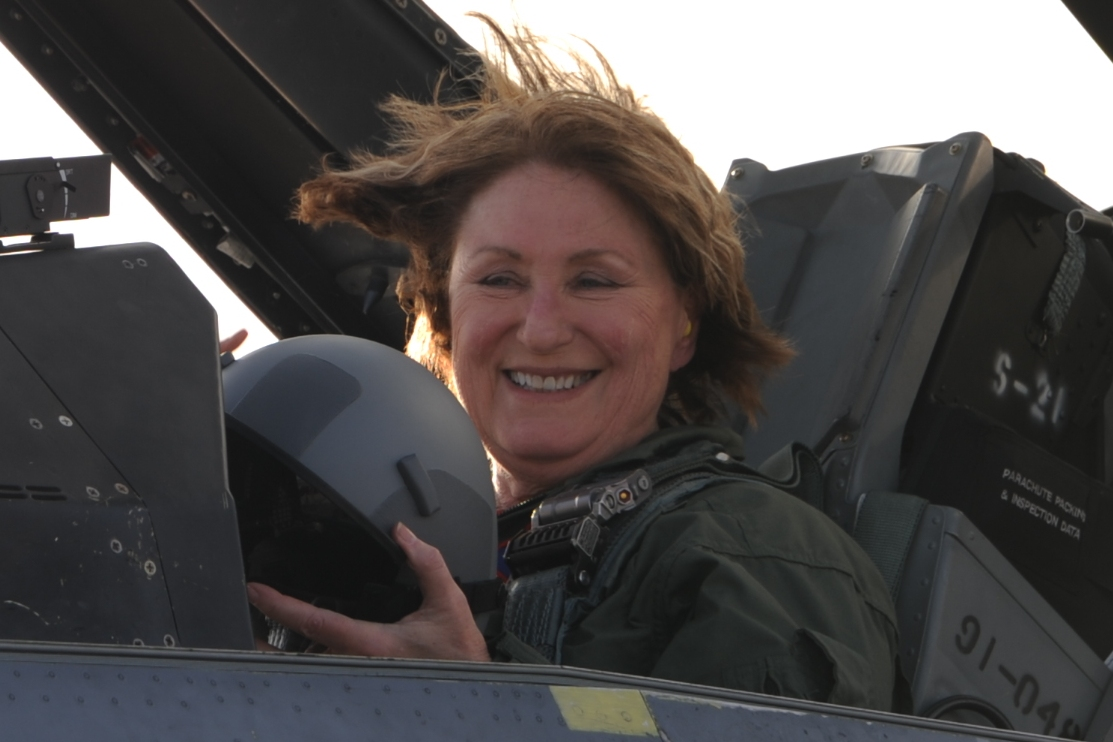
Ann Weaver Hart seated in a F-16D Fighting Falcon at Davis–Monthan Air Force Base in 2016

Ann Weaver Hart (born 1948) is the 21st, first female chief executive and former president of the University of Arizona. She is the first woman to hold the position, which she assumed on November 30, 2012. Previously, Hart was the ninth president and first female chief executive of Temple University in Philadelphia, a position she held beginning on July 1, 2006.

== Education ==
Hart received an M.A. in history and a Ph.D. in educational administration, both from the University of Utah. Her research interests include leadership succession and development, work redesign and organizational behavior in educational organizations, and academic freedom.

== DeVry controversy ==
In February 2016, DeVry Education Group announced that it had appointed President Hart and Linda P.B. Katehi, chancellor of the University of California, Davis, to serve on its board of directors. One month earlier, the Federal Trade Commission had filed a lawsuit against DeVry for deceptive advertising. Following criticism over her decision to join DeVry's board, Chancellor Katehi resigned from the board. President Hart continues to serve on DeVry's board of directors. Amid student protests, Hart announced on June 10, 2016, that she would not seek to extend to her employment contract with the University of Arizona past its June 30, 2018 end date.

== Achievements ==
Among the professional and community service awards that Hart has received are the Jack Culbertson Award in Educational Administration from the University Council for Educational Administration; the Outstanding Professional Award from the Business and Professional Women's Foundation; the PoWeR Award from the Professional Women's Roundtable; the 2009 Champion of Diversity and Access Award from the Urban STEM Strategy Group; and the Outstanding Community Service Award from the Network for Teaching Entrepreneurship. In addition to serving as the 21st president of the university, President Hart holds a faculty appointment in the College of Education as professor of educational policy studies and practice.

President Hart currently serves as a member of the following organizations:

- American Association of Universities
- Association of Public Land Grant Universities
- Arizona State Board of Education
- Campus Research Corporation
- DeVry Education Group
- Greater Phoenix Leadership
- Southern Arizona Leadership Council
- Tucson Regional Economic Opportunities, Chairman's Circle
- UA Alumni Board
- UA Foundation Board
- Udall Foundation
- University of New Hampshire Foundation Board of Directors (Member Emeritus)

She has been recognized for her achievements and service by many organizations, including the Business and Professional Women's Foundation, the University Council for Educational Administration, and the Utah Women's Forum, and has been honored as a Distinguished Alumna of the College of Humanities of the University of Utah.

== University of New Hampshire ==
Ann Weaver Hart served as the eighteenth President at the University of New Hampshire from 2002 to 2006.

== Temple University ==
Early in Weaver Hart's first year as Temple University president she announced that after consultation with the board, a vacation period between the Christmas and New Year holidays would be re-offered. It had been rescinded during the Adamany administration. Weaver Hart also began a holiday party tradition during her first year. Hart is also known for the way in which she left Temple. Hart cited her need to assist her ill mother in Utah when describing her decision to resign. Within five months of the announcement of her resignation, Hart was announced among the finalists for the presidency of the University of Arizona. This announcement, not one known to the Temple community, elicited surprise from many. Hart stepped down on June 30, 2012.

== University of Arizona ==
Hart became president of University of Arizona on July 9, 2012. Hart stepped down on May 31, 2017.

== Personal life ==
Hart's husband is Randy. They have four daughters, two granddaughters, and four grandsons. As a grandmother, she is known to sprinkle her introductions and speeches with mention of her young grandchildren.

== Selected publications ==
- The Principalship: A Theory of Professional Learning and Practice (1996) with Paul V. Bredeson
- Designing and Conducting Research (1996) with Clifford J. Drew and Michael L. Hardman
