= Eugene Applebaum College of Pharmacy and Health Sciences =

Coordinates: 42°20′56.5″N 83°03′19.8″W

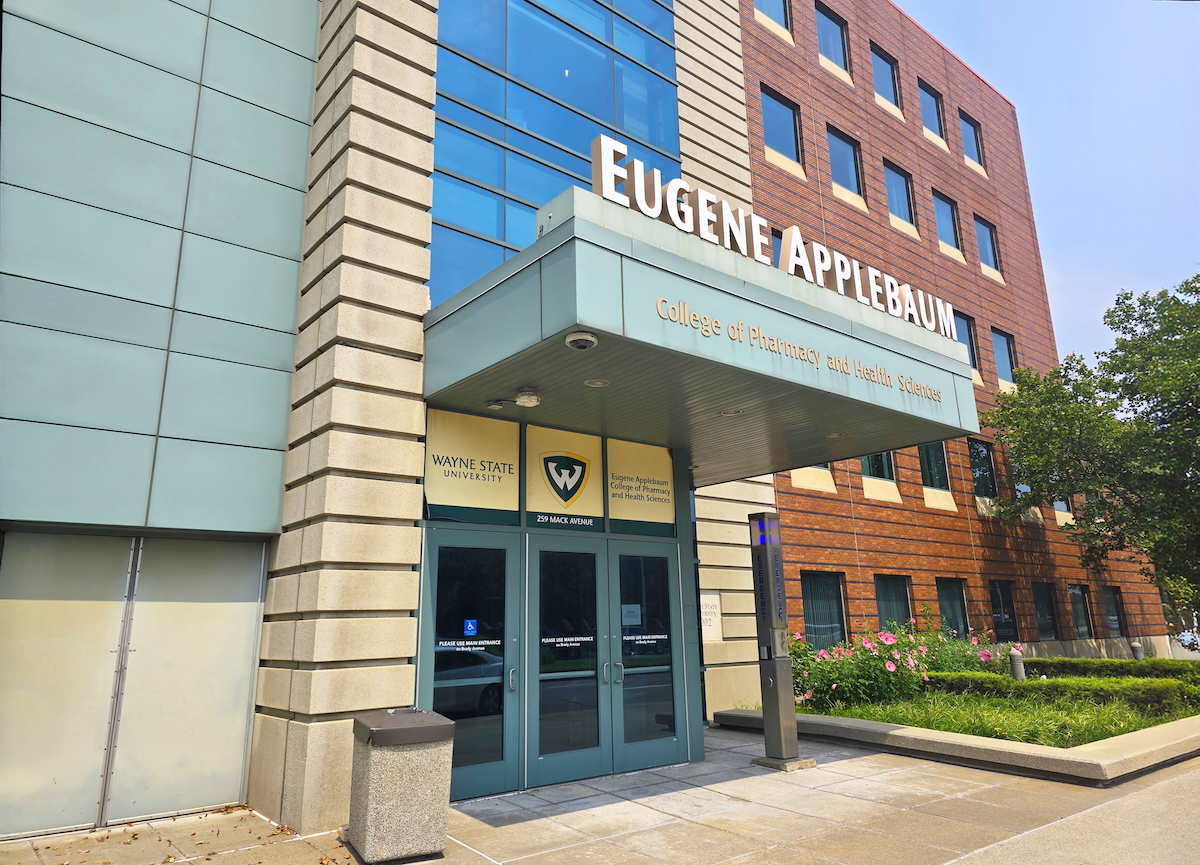
- Type: Public health science college
- Established: 1924
- Parent institution: Wayne State University
- Dean: Brian Cummings
- Location: Detroit, Michigan, U.S.
- Website: applebaum.wayne.edu

The Eugene Applebaum College of Pharmacy and Health Sciences is the health science college of Wayne State University, a public research university in Detroit, Michigan, United States.

== History ==
The Eugene Applebaum College of Pharmacy and Health Sciences was established in 1924 as the College of Pharmacy within the College of the City of Detroit. It was created to bring formalized pharmaceutical education to a city where most pharmacists had been trained through informal apprenticeships. Initially housed in what is now Old Main, the college offered a three-year program in pharmaceutical chemistry. Its founding dean was Roland T. Lakey. The college expanded its curriculum and achieved full accreditation from the American Council of Pharmaceutical Education in 1939.

In the following decades, the college broadened its scope to include a range of allied health programs. During the 1970s and 1980s, it added departments in physical therapy, occupational therapy, nurse anesthesia, mortuary science, radiation therapy, and medical laboratory science. In 1974, it merged with the Division of Allied Health to become the College of Pharmacy and Allied Health Professions.

In the late 1990s, plans were initiated to build a new facility to accommodate growing enrollment and technological demands. With a $5 million lead gift from alumnus and Arbor Drugs founder Eugene Applebaum and additional funding from the State of Michigan, construction began on a new building located at 259 Mack Avenue in Detroit's Midtown. The college officially opened its new facility in 2002, and in recognition of Applebaum's contributions, was renamed the Eugene Applebaum College of Pharmacy and Health Sciences in 2001. Today, the college remains a core part of Wayne State University's academic and research mission, offering a wide range of programs across the health sciences.

On April 15, 2021, Wayne State alumnus Brian Cummings was announced as the 10th dean for the College of Pharmacy and Health Sciences.

== Academics ==
Wayne State University's Eugene Applebaum College of Pharmacy and Health Sciences is one of the few institutions in the United States that offers both a Doctor of Pharmacy (PharmD) program and other professional health care programs within a single college.

In the 2024 U.S. News & World Report Best Graduate Schools rankings, the Eugene Applebaum College of Pharmacy and Health Sciences at Wayne State University earned national recognition for its academic programs. The college's Doctor of Pharmacy (PharmD) program was ranked no. 38 in the nation while its Nurse Anesthesia program was ranked no. 51.

== Programs ==
- Bachelor of Science in Applied Health Sciences
- Interprofessional Education and Practice
- Master of Health Administration
- Medical Laboratory Science
- Mortuary Science
- Nurse Anesthesia
- Pathologists’ Assistant
- Occupational Therapy
- Physical Therapy
- Physician Assistant Studies
- Radiation Therapy Technology
- Doctor of Pharmacy
- Pharmaceutical Sciences
- Pharmacy Practice

Past Programs

- Forensic Investigation
- Radiologic Technology

== Building ==
In 1965, the college moved into Shapero Hall on Wayne State's main campus, named after Nate Shapero, a prominent Detroit pharmacist and donor.

The current location opened in May 2002 and is named after Eugene Applebaum, a prominent Detroit-area pharmacist, entrepreneur, and philanthropist best known as the founder of Arbor Drugs. The building is 270,000 square feet with five floors, six levels and was designed by Neumann/Smith Architecture. The building provides multiple laboratories, offices, and classrooms, for each program. Mortuary science students work in their own building, located on Woodward Avenue in Detroit.

== Student life ==
In fall 2019, the Eugene Applebaum College of Pharmacy and Health Sciences enrolled a total of 976 students, including 926 full-time and 50 part-time students. Of the total student population, 203 were undergraduates, 368 were enrolled in graduate programs, and 405 were professional students.

In September 2025, it was announced that the college had its largest enrollment in nearly a decade, with more than 1,000 students.
