= David Adamany =

Political scientist, academic

David Walter Adamany

8th president of Wayne State University
- In office 1983–1997
- Preceded by: Thomas N. Bonner
- Succeeded by: Irvin D. Reid

Head of Detroit Public School District
- In office 1999–2000

8th president of Temple University
- In office 2000–2006
- Preceded by: Peter J. Liacouras
- Succeeded by: Ann Weaver Hart

Personal details
- Born: September 23, 1936 Janesville, Wisconsin
- Died: November 10, 2016 (aged 80)
- Parents: Walter Joseph (father); Dora Marie Adamany (mother)
- Education: Harvard University; Harvard Law School; University of Wisconsin
- Occupation: Professor of Political Science

David Walter Adamany (September 23, 1936 – November 10, 2016) was the 8th president of Wayne State University, from 1983 to 1997. One of Wayne State University's libraries, David Adamany Undergraduate Library, was his creation. Subsequently, Adamany later was head of the Detroit Public School District from 1999 to 2000. He was Temple University's eighth president, from 2000 to 2006. David Adamany died Thursday November 10, 2016.

== Early life ==
Adamany was born in Janesville, Wisconsin, on September 23, 1936, to Walter Joseph and Dora Marie Adamany, both of Lebanese immigrant descent. He was the oldest of four Adamany children, including one brother and two sisters.

After graduating from high school, he received a full scholarship to Harvard University, where he completed his degree in government (magna cum laude, 1958) and juris doctor (J.D.) degree from Harvard Law School (1961). He continued his education at the University of Wisconsin at Madison, under the advisement and mentorship of Dr. Leon Epstein, where he received a Ph.D. in political science in 1967.

== Early career ==
His early career was in the state of Wisconsin as special assistant to the attorney general (1961–1963) and pardon counsel to governor John W. Reynolds (1963). At the age of 27, he was appointed as a member of Wisconsin's public service commission (1963–1965). In Wisconsin governor Patrick J. Lucey's administration, David was special advisor to the governor and Wisconsin secretary of revenue (1973–1976).

== Academic career ==
After graduating from the University of Wisconsin, David joined Wesleyan University, where he was professor of government (1967–1972) and dean of the college (1969–1970). He returned to the University of Wisconsin, Madison, as professor of political science (1972–1977), before going on to California State University at Long Beach as professor of political science and vice president for academic affairs (1977–1980).

During 1980–1982, David joined the University of Maryland system as professor of political science at the College Park and Baltimore County campuses, as well as vice president of academic affairs for the entire university system.

He joined Wayne State University as its president from 1982 to 1997. Adamany then was chief executive officer of the Detroit Public Schools from 1999 to 2000, a position he was appointed to by Michigan governor John Engler as part of a restructuring of school governance. After that he became the eighth president of Temple University in Philadelphia, Pennsylvania, where he was for six years.

From 2004 until his death, he was a member of the Board of Visitors for Political Science at the University of Wisconsin, Madison.

== Gay pioneer ==
Adamany was openly gay, and in 1998 was recognized with a Distinguished Alumni Award by the University of Wisconsin Alumni Association's Gay, Lesbian, and Bisexual Council. In 2000, the Arab Community Center for Economic and Social Services honored him as Arab American of the Year.

Academic offices
Preceded by Peter J. Liacouras	President of Temple University; 2000–2006	Succeeded by Ann Weaver Hart
Preceded by Thomas Bonner	President of Wayne State University; 1982-1997	Succeeded by Irvin D. Reid
