= Research Universities of Michigan =

University Research Corridor logo.

The University Research Corridor (URC), rebranded as the Research Universities of Michigan (RU4M) since 2025, is a university alliance consisting of Michigan State University, the University of Michigan, Wayne State University, and Michigan Technological University. It was founded on November 28, 2006.

In 2015, the URC drew $1.878 billion in federal academic research dollars to Michigan, 94 percent of the total coming into the state.

Over the past five years, URC universities have announced an average of one new invention every day, and collectively these discoveries have led to more than 500 license agreements for new technologies and systems. Detroit News columnist Dan Howes once wrote that the three universities together offer “the closest thing Michigan has to Silicon Valley—an intellectual powerhouse.”

The URC had 137,583 students enrolled in the fall of 2010. The students at the URC universities are drawn from throughout Michigan and around the world. Students from the state of Michigan accounted for 75% of total enrollment in the fall of 2009, while 15% came from elsewhere in the U.S. and the remaining 10% came from other countries.

== History ==
The University Research Corridor (URC) was founded on November 28, 2006 as an alliance between Michigan State University, the University of Michigan, and Wayne State University. Their stated aim was to transform, strengthen, and diversify the state of Michigan's economy. The University Research Corridor referred not only to their alliance, but to the region they are located in.

In March 2025, Michigan Technological University in the Upper Peninsula of Michigan joined the alliance. Subsequently, in May 2025, the alliance was rebranded as the "Research Universities for Michigan" (RU4M).

== Location ==
Michigan State University (MSU) is located four miles east of the Michigan State Capitol in East Lansing. The main campus of University of Michigan (U-M) is located in Ann Arbor, which is 50 miles southeast of MSU and 40 miles west of Detroit. Wayne State University is located in the heart of Detroit, the Midtown Cultural Center. The Michigan Technological University of Houghton, however, is a 271 mile drive from the closest member of the alliance, MSU.

== Transportation ==
The corridor is served by the three major Interstate Highways in Southeastern Michigan—I-75, I-94, and I-96. Further enabling the close collaboration between these institutions, each Lower Peninsula school is under a two-hour drive of their local members. All three of the original members are close to the Detroit Metropolitan Wayne County Airport (DTW), the 15th busiest airport in the United States as of December 2025. Although the Capital Region International Airport may be more convenient for MSU students because it is a 20-minute commute from their campus.

Travel Time via DTW
Ann Arbor (UMich)	27 minutes
Detroit (Wayne State)	23 minutes
East Lansing (Michigan State)	1.3 hours
Michigan Technological University	9-10 hours

The closest major airport to the Michigan Technological University is the Milwaukee Mitchell International Airport in Wisconsin. It is roughly 350 miles or 6 hours away.

== Peer comparison ==
A 2014 Economic Impact Report by Anderson Economic Group ranked the URC second in the Innovation Power Ranking when compared to seven other major university research clusters in six states, including well-known hubs such as North Carolina's Research Triangle Park, California's Innovation Hubs and Massachusetts’ Route 128 Corridor. The report also found that URC universities conferred 32,483 graduate and undergraduate degrees in 2012, more than any of the university innovation clusters the URC has benchmarked itself against since 2007. The URC also granted the highest number of medical degrees and second-highest number of high-demand degrees overall, saw its research and development spending rise to nearly $2.1 billion and continued to commercialize its research through patents and start-up companies.

== Ongoing emphasis ==
Economic Stimulus

- An economic report detailing the collective successes of the URC universities as well as a metric comparison to their peer clusters is released annually each winter.
