= John W. McConnell (academician) =

American college president

11th President of the University of New Hampshire
- In office 1963–1971
- Preceded by: Eldon L. Johnson
- Succeeded by: Thomas N. Bonner

Personal details
- Born: October 18, 1907 Philadelphia, Pennsylvania, US
- Died: February 19, 1997 (aged 89) Trumansburg, New York, US
- Education: Dickinson College; Yale University

John Wilkinson McConnell (October 18, 1907 – February 19, 1997) was an American college president. McConnell was the eleventh President of the University of New Hampshire from 1963 to 1971. He was appointed president during a period of discussions of the establishment of a state university system in New Hampshire.

McConnell received his BA from Dickinson College in 1929 and his PhD from Yale University in 1937.

McConnell died on Feb. 19, 1997, at his home in Trumansburg, N.Y., He was 89 years old.
