= M. Roy Wilson =

American businessman

12th President of Wayne State University
- In office August 1, 2013 – July 31, 2023
- Preceded by: Allan Gilmour
- Succeeded by: Kimberly Andrews Espy

Personal details
- Born: November 28, 1953 (age 72) Yokohama, Japan
- Education: Allegheny College; University of California, Los Angeles; Harvard Medical School
- Website: President M. Roy Wilson

M. Roy Wilson (born November 28, 1953) is an American ophthalmologist and academic administrator who served as the 12th President of Wayne State University.

== Education ==
Wilson was born in Yokohama, Japan. He completed his undergraduate degree at Allegheny College in Meadville, Pennsylvania in 1976. Soon after graduating, he was accepted to Harvard Medical School, where he received his M.D. in 1980. It was there he trained as an ophthalmologist and researcher. Wilson is an accomplished researcher, focused on glaucoma and blindness in West Africa, the Caribbean and urban communities in the United States. Most of his scientific and service contributions have been in developing countries. In 1985, M. Roy Wilson attended the University of California, Los Angeles to complete his master's degree in epidemiology. He graduated in 1990.

== Career ==
Wilson was unanimously elected President of Wayne State University by the Board of Governors on June 5, 2013. He assumed the presidency on August 1, 2013.

Prior to joining Wayne State, President Wilson served as deputy director for strategic scientific planning and program coordination at the National Institute on Minority Health and Health Disparities of National Institutes of Health.

== Previous career ==
- (One time) Chancellor - University of Colorado Denver
- Former Chair of Board of Directors - University of Colorado Hospital
- Dean of School of Medicine - Creighton University
- Vice President - Creighton University
- President - Texas Tech University Health Sciences Center
- (Part-time) Former President - Charles R. Drew University of Medicine and Science in L.A.
- Chairman of Board of Directors - Charles R. Drew University of Medicine and Science in L.A.

== Achievements and awards ==
- The Institute of Medicine of the National Academy of Sciences – Member
- The International Glaucoma Research Society – Member
- The American Ophthalmological Society - Member
- Committee of the NIH-funded Ocular Hypertension Treatment Study - The executive
- The Data Monitoring and Oversight Committee of the NIH-funded Los Angeles Latino Eye Study - Chair
- The Advisory councils of NIMHD - Member
- The NIH Director's Working Group on Diversity in the Biomedical Research Workforce – Member
- Best Doctors in America Award – 14 consecutive years
- American Academy of Ophthalmology - Senior Achievement Award
- The Minority Health Institute - Distinguished Physician Award
- The Association of American Medical Colleges - Herbert W. Nickens Award
- National Institutes of Health - NIH Director's Award
