= Institute of Gerontology =

Research institute at Wayne State University

Coordinates: 42°21′43.1″N 83°03′56.7″W

The Institute of Gerontology (IOG) at Wayne State University conducts research on the behavioral and social aspects of aging. Located in Detroit, Michigan, the Institute has a strong focus on urban issues, especially disability, mobility and transportation, financial challenges, and disparities in health between ethnic groups. Faculty at the Institute are jointly appointed with a home department in a complementary discipline, such as economics, physical therapy or nursing. The Institute also maintains a Lifespan Cognitive Neuroscience of Aging laboratory currently profiling brain changes in normal aging through traditional testing and magnetic resonance imaging (MRI) of participants brain structure and function.

Faculty at the Institute collaborate on research with home departments, such as Wayne State University’s Department of Psychology, Department of Economics, Department of Family Medicine and Public Health Sciences, Medical Anthropology Program, Department of Health Care Sciences, and externally with Institute of Social Research at the University of Michigan and the Max Planck Institute for Human Development to name a few. Faculty members also mentor pre-doctoral trainees and post-doctoral fellows interested in combining studies of aging with their primary discipline.

It is part of a three-building compound that includes the historic Charles L. Freer home, and the Merrill Palmer Skillman Early Childhood Center.

== History and Leadership ==
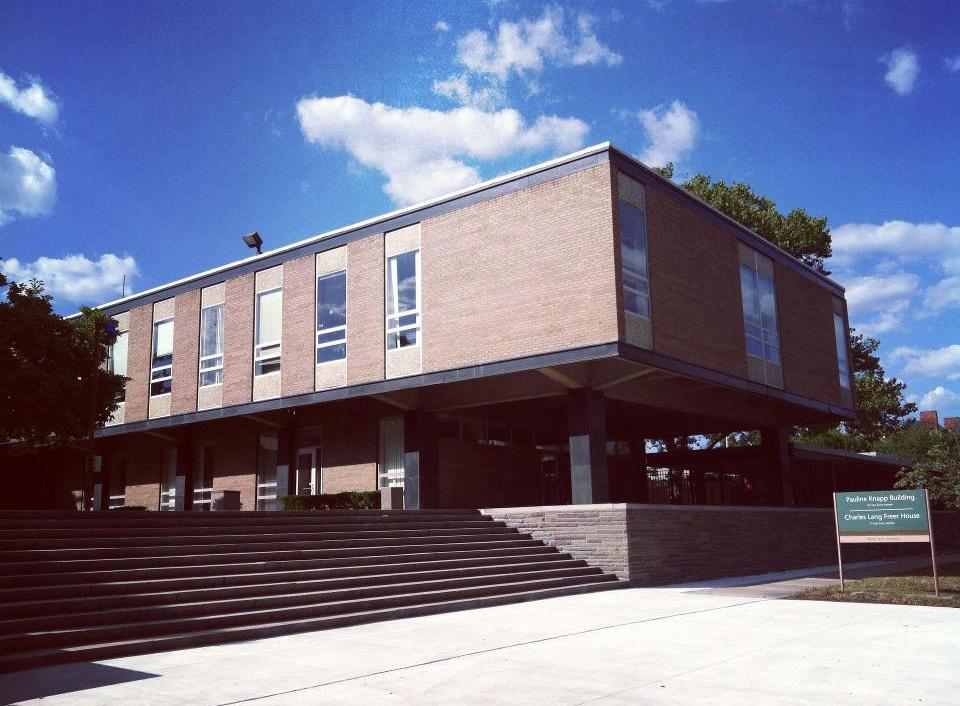
View of the Institute of Gerontology from Ferry St.

The Wayne State University Board of Governors created the Institute of Gerontology in 1965 in response to a mandate from the State of Michigan. The primary mission in that era was to engage in research, education, and service in the field of aging. Since its creation, the Institute has grown in number of faculty, research awards, professional development trainings (continuing education), and programs to serve the surrounding urban community.

Peter Lichtenberg, Ph.D., has been the director of the Institute since 1998. He has enhanced and expanded the Institute of Gerontology's research, education and community outreach. Since 2001 the Institute of Gerontology has maintained a high level of research grant and publication productivity exceeding previous high funding marks by 300%. He founded the IOG Pre-doctoral training program in aging and urban health and has been the PI on a National Institute of Aging training grant since 2001; helping to train nearly 50 doctoral students in an intensive aging research program. He created the Art of Aging conference and the Healthier Black Elders Annual Health Reception, and has overseen the growth of the community outreach for older adults and for the professionals who work with them. Dr. Lichtenberg created the first fund development efforts of the Institute of Gerontology in 2004 and works with a strong Board of Visitors to enhance these efforts.

Dr. Lichtenberg is the author of six books including the acclaimed Handbook of Assessment in Clinical Gerontology (2nd edition), Handbook of Dementia (2003), Mental Health Practice in Geriatric Health Care Settings (1998) and A Guide to psychological Practice in Geriatric Long Term Care (1994). He has authored or co-authored over 130 peer review journal articles. His particular areas of research include mental health in long term care, geriatric depression, geriatric psychology and medical rehabilitation and the early detection and management of Alzheimer's disease. Emerging research includes older adult gambling, victims of fraud and kinship care.

The Lifespan Cognitive Neuroscience of Aging program began in 2010 to study brain development from the fetal stage to old age. Researchers Ana Daugherty, Ph.D., Jessica Damoiseaux, Ph.D., and Noa Ofen, Ph.D., use structural and functional MRI to examine normal lifespan changes in the regional brain anatomy, white matter microstructure, iron content and myelination as well as functional connectivity and response to memory tasks. Researchers also examine the effects of dementia, anxiety and behavioral disorders on brain architecture and function. Publications of the researchers in the Lifespan Cognitive Neuroscience Program can be found in major journals,

== Mission ==
The Institute of Gerontology at Wayne State University dedicates research in the social and behavioral sciences and cognitive neuroscience to issues of aging and urban health. The four priorities include Research, Education, Outreach, and Partnerships. This mission has remained virtually unchanged for more than a decade.

=== Research ===
Institute of Gerontology logo

In 2010-2011, Institute research grant totals reached $6.6 million, the majority of this funding is through the National Institutes of Health. The faculty conduct independent research and work with other university departments, institutes, and centers in collaborative research projects. Institute investigators receive funding from a variety of public and private agencies and foundations and publish their work in a variety of academic journals. The Institute regularly hosts a wide range of seminars, round tables, colloquia, programs and other events to address relevant aspects of aging.

Institute research covers a wide range of topics on aging and health, most recently:

Minority Mental Health and Well Being

- Hispanic Community Health Study/Study of Latinos
- Epidemiology of Late-Life Depression and Ethnicity Research (ELLDERS)
- Training OTs to strengthen depression assessment and treatment in older adults

Disability and Aging

- Downsizing Possessions for Residential Moves in Later Life
- Self-Rated Health and Successful Aging
- Spinal Cord Injury and Self-Rate Health
- Returning Wounded Soldiers to Meaningful Civilian Lives
- Alzheimer's disease

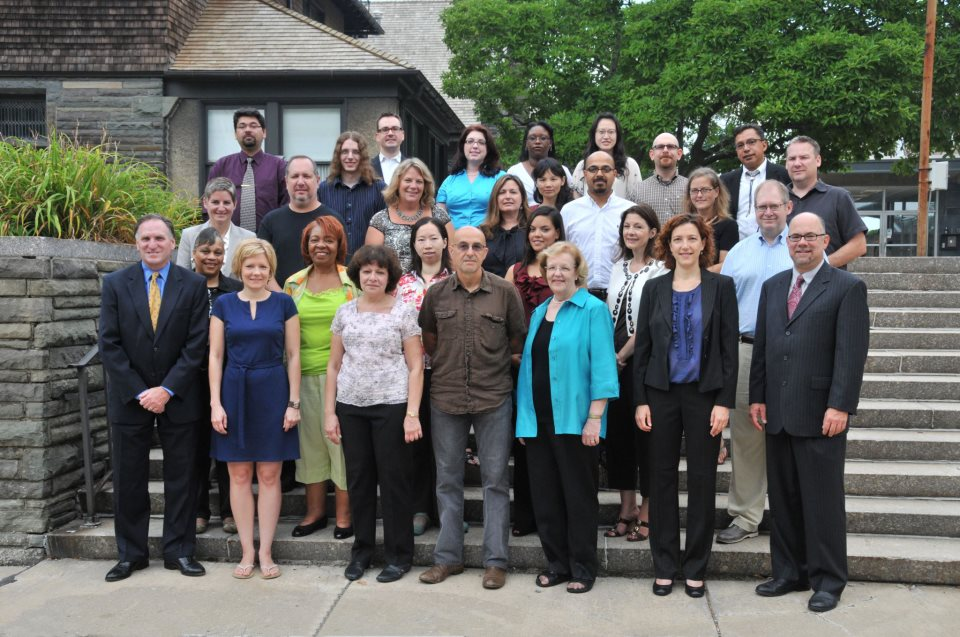
Faculty and staff at the Institute of Gerontology

Financial Gerontology'

- Why Do People Let Their Long-Term Care Insurance Lapse?
- Prospective Predictors of Fraud in Older Adults
- The Tyranny of Compounding Fees: Are Mutual Funds Bleeding Retirement Accounts Dry?
- Long-Run Health Effects of Non-Adherence to Prescribed Medications
- The aging of the population and the demography of older adults
- Social Security, Medicaid, and other public policies related to aging

Health Care Disparities among Minorities

- Minority health and aging especially in Latinos and Mexican Americans
- Prevalence and treatment of depression
- Aging and health disparities (particularly among minorities living with chronic disease)

Lifespan Cognitive Neuroscience of Aging

- Changes in the brain structure and function between childhood and young adulthood
- The development of basic cognitive abilities, learning and memory from in utero onward
- Effects of brain aging on cognition
- Impact of vascular risk factors on aging of the brain and cognition
- Impact of single nucleotide polymorphisms on aging brain and cognition

The Institute maintains a pool of 1,627 older African American volunteers willing to consider participation in research projects on aging issues. This Participant Research Pool is a function of the Healthier Black Elders Center, a part of the Institute dedicated to reducing the significant disparities in health and mortality between older African Americans and other ethnic groups, especially Caucasians.

=== Education ===
The IOG offers academic and professional opportunities for education and training in aging and health. In 2011, the Institute educated 3,739 professionals, older adults and caregivers in person-to-person presentations. This represents a 2,400% increase over the numbers of seniors and professionals educated in 2001—a direct response to the country's increased numbers of older adults simultaneous with a major reduction in gerontologists and other professionals who specialize in treating seniors.

==== Issues in Aging Conference ====
Since 1987, the Institute of Gerontology has hosted an annual two-day Issues in Aging Conference focused on clinical and research advances in the diagnosis and treatment of Alzheimer's and other dementias. More than 250 nurses, social workers, physicians, physical and occupational therapists and other professionals working with older adults attend each day and earn continuing education credits.

=== Outreach ===
==== Healthier Black Elders ====
The Healthier Black Elders Center health reception (HBEC) has served over 1200 African American seniors for a day of education, health screenings, exercise and celebration. HBEC developed from a 13-year Wayne State University and University of Michigan partnership. The center's annual health reception and learning series are outreach programs created as an effort to help correct health disparities among African American seniors. The Healthier Black Elders Center is funded and administered through the Michigan Center for Urban African American Aging Research, a National Institute of Aging program to improve the health of older African Americans. The Healthier Black Elders Centers also maintains a pool of potential research volunteers (1,627 members in 2011) who are older, urban and African American and can be used by approved researchers from Wayne State University and other universities.

==== Annual Art of Aging Successfully Conference ====
The annual Art of Aging Successfully Conference celebrates creative expression as an enriching way to transition through the aging process. Approximately 350 older adults attend the program each year, engaging in healthy and entertaining activities to inspire their creativity. Many exhibit their (non-professional) paintings, photography, sculpture, quilting, woodworking, jewelry, embroidery and other handicrafts. In addition to the display artists, an additional 60 - 100 older adults submit prose, poetry or memoirs to the Creative Expressions booklet printed for each attendee.

==== Transitions newsletter ====
Since 1994, the Institute of Gerontology has issued a twice-yearly newsletter, Transitions, which highlights advances in Institute research .

=== Partnerships ===
The Institute of Gerontology partners with organizations and individuals for purposes of research, education, and community outreach. Partners include non-profit organizations such as the Alzheimer's Association, AARP of Michigan, and the Social Security Administration, home health care agencies, nursing homes, insurance providers and hospitals. Partners help to sponsor many of the continuing education programs offered and also support the major outreach conferences.
