= Robert F. Chandler =

American college president (1907–1999)

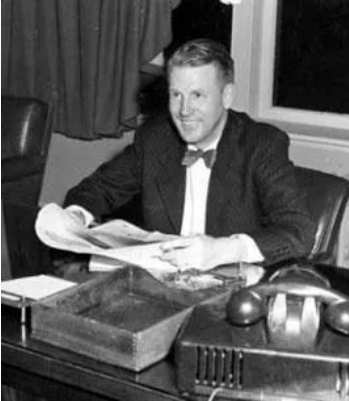

9th President of the University of New Hampshire
- In office 1950–1954
- Preceded by: Arthur S. Adams
- Succeeded by: Eldon L. Johnson

Personal details
- Born: June 22, 1907 Columbus, Ohio
- Died: March 23, 1999 (aged 91) Eustis, Florida
- Education: University of Maine B.S (1929); University of Maryland Ph.D (1934)

Robert Flint Chandler Jr. (June 22, 1907 - March 23, 1999) was an American horticulturalist, and founding director of the International Rice Research Institute (IRRI). Later, he was appointed as the first director-general of the Asian Vegetable Research and Development Center (AVRDC), which became the World Vegetable Center (WorldVeg). In 1988 he was awarded the World Food Prize for his leadership in building the agricultural research capacity at IRRI and AVRDC.

== Education ==
Chandler obtained a degree in horticulture from the University of Maine in 1929. He completed his Ph.D. in Pomology from the University of Maryland in 1934. He first taught at Cornell University and went on to become the Dean of the College of Agriculture, and then the ninth President, of the University of New Hampshire.

== International Rice Research Institute ==
From 1959 to 1972, Chandler was the founding Director of the International Rice Research Institute (IRRI) in Los Banos, Philippines. Working with a team of twenty-four researchers from numerous countries in Southeast Asia, he gathered thousands of rice varieties to be tested and eventually selected to be grown under various conditions. His leadership was instrumental in developing over two dozen new varieties of rice that produced higher yields than traditional strains and increased rice production. These varieties helped the Philippines to achieve self-sufficiency in rice by 1968, and still provide food for millions across Asia.

In 1971 Chandler was appointed as first Director General of the Asian Vegetable Research and Development Center (AVRDC) founded at Shanhua, southern Taiwan, by the Asian Development Bank, Taiwan, South Korea, Japan, the Philippines, Thailand, the United States and South Vietnam. AVRDC was rebranded as the World Vegetable Center in 2008.

== Awards ==
In 1975, the government of the Republic of China awarded Chandler with the Order of Brilliant Star. He was awarded the Presidential End Hunger Award, and in 1988, he was awarded the World Food Prize for his leadership in building the agricultural research capacity at IRRI and AVRDC.

== Selected works ==
An Adventure in Applied Science: A History of the International Rice Research Institute, 1982
