= Thomas N. Bonner =

American academic (1923–2003)

12th President of the University of New Hampshire
- In office 1971–1974
- Preceded by: John W. McConnell
- Succeeded by: Eugene S. Mills

15th President of Union College
- In office 1974–1978
- Preceded by: Harold Clark Martin
- Succeeded by: John Selwyn Morris

7th President of Wayne State University
- In office 1978–1982
- Preceded by: George E. Gullen Jr.
- Succeeded by: David Adamany

Personal details
- Born: May 28, 1923 Rochester, New York, US
- Died: September 2, 2003 (aged 80) Scottsdale, Arizona, US
- Education: University of Rochester

Thomas Neville Bonner (28 May 1923 – 2 September 2003) was professor emeritus at Wayne State University and a leading historian of medicine. Bonner was the twelfth President of the University of New Hampshire from 1971 to 1974. After 3 years at UNH he became the fifteenth president of Union College from 1974 to 1978. He then became the seventh president of Wayne State University from 1978 to 1982. Bonner was a U.S. Army World War II veteran as part of the Army Signal Intelligence Unit in Europe. He is buried at the National Memorial Cemetery of Arizona in Phoenix, Arizona.

== Selected publications ==
- Iconoclast: Abraham Flexner and a Life in Learning
- To the Ends of the Earth: Women's Search for Education in Medicine
- Becoming a Physician: Medical Education in Britain, France, Germany, and the United States, 1750–1945
- Medicine in Chicago, 1850–1950: A Chapter in the Social and Scientific Development of a City
- American Doctors and German Universities: A Chapter in Intellectual Relations, 1870–1914
- The Kansas doctor: A century of pioneering
- Our Recent Past
- The contemporary world: The social sciences in historical perspective
