= Jay Noren =

American education administrator

Jay Noren is the former President of Wayne State University and former Provost of Khalifa University in Abu Dhabi.

== Life ==
On Tuesday, July 20, 2010, Jay Noren announced his resignation from Wayne State University for personal reasons.

In December 2015, Noren applied for the presidency of the University of North Dakota. He was one of six finalist applicants invited to the University in early 2016, though the position was ultimately given to Mark Kennedy.

Preceded by Irvin Reid	President of Wayne State University; 2008 - 2011	Succeeded by Allan Gilmour
