= Allan Gilmour (university administrator) =

American executive and university president

- Born: Allan Dana Gilmour; June 17, 1934; Barnet, Vermont
- Education: Harvard University (BA); University of Michigan (MBA)
- Occupations: Corporate executive, university president
- Years active: 1960–1995; 2002-2005; 2011-2013
- Known for: Vice chairman, Ford Motor Company, and first openly gay senior executive of a Fortune 100 company
- Spouse: Eric Girgens

Allan D. Gilmour is an American businessman and former university president. In his role as chief financial officer and former vice chairman of Ford Motor Company, he was the highest ranking, openly gay executive of a Fortune 100 company.

== Early life and education ==
Allan Dana Gilmour was born on June 17, 1934 in Barnet, Vermont, and was raised on Maplemont Farm in Barnet. He is the oldest son of Marjorie Fyler Gilmour (1906-1987), a homemaker, and Albert Davis Gilmour (1900-1980), a dairy cow dealer.

Like his father, Gilmour attended Exeter and graduated in 1952. He was classmates with Jay Rockefeller. After Exeter, Gilmour attended Harvard University, where he earned a bachelor’s degree in economics in 1956. He enrolled at the University of Michigan Law School, became uninterested in legal studies, and then transferred to University of Michigan Business School. Gilmour finished his MBA requirements in three semesters, and graduated in 1959. He also worked as a teaching fellow and studied for a PhD at Michigan.

== Career ==
=== Ford Motor Company ===
In 1960, Gilmour was hired as a financial analyst at Ford Motor Company. Throughout his initial thirty-five year career at Ford, he served as vice president of external and personnel affairs, vice president and controller, chief financial officer and a member of the board of directors (1986), executive vice president for international automotive operations (1987), president of Ford Automotive Group (1990), president of Ford Motor Credit Company, and vice chairman (1993), the number two position in command.

Gilmour was the leading candidate to become Ford's chairman and chief executive officer on two separate occasions. In 1989, he was thought to be the choice of outgoing CEO Donald Petersen, yet was passed over for Red Poling. In 1992, Gilmour was passed over again, this time for Alex Trotman. After being rejected twice for CEO, Gilmour, who was not openly gay, decided to retire from Ford in 1995 at age 60.

In December 1996, Gilmour came out as gay in an interview with a Detroit LGBTQ publication. He is recognized as the first corporate executive to be identified as gay and to serve as chairman or vice chairman of a Fortune 100 company. In 2002, Gilmour, returned to Ford as chief financial officer, and retired three years later in 2005. In total, Gilmour worked at Ford for thirty-eight years.

Gilmour was the principal owner of a Ford-Chrysler dealership located in St. Johnsbury, Vermont.

=== Wayne State University ===
In 2010, Gilmour was named interim president of Wayne State University. In 2011, the Board of Governors at Wayne State University unanimously elected Gilmour to serve as university president. In 2012, Gilmour underwent treatment for prostate cancer. In 2013, he retired from the university. Upon his retirement, Gilmour donated his salary that he earned during his tenure back to the university in the form of an endowed scholarship gift to honor his husband, Eric Jirgens.

== Personal life ==
In the spring of 1994, Gilmour met Eric Jirgens, who is twenty-eight years younger than him, at a dinner party in Grosse Pointe, Michigan. In 1995, Gilmour and Jirgens co-founded the Gilmour-Jirgens Fund that has donated millions of dollars to charity, including lesbian and gay organizations. The fund is managed by the Community Foundation for Southeast Michigan. In 2015, Gilmour and Jirgens married, and the couple live in Birmingham, Michigan.

Gilmour has two brothers: Richard Doug Gilmour, who died in 2022, and John GIlmour, who preceded Richard in death.

== Boards and affiliations ==
Gilmour co-chaired a capital campaign for University of Michigan that raised $1.4 billion. He also served as an honorary co-chair of The Michigan Difference Campaign that raised $3.2 billion, the largest amount by a public university in the United States.

Gilmour has served as a member of the board of directors of DTE Energy Company, Whirlpool Corporation, Ford Motor Co., US West, MediaOne Group, Prudential Financial, Dow Chemical, Whirlpool and Universal Technical Institute.

In 1995, he served as chairman of the Henry Ford Health System. In addition, Gilmour served as a trustee or board member of several organizations, including the University of Detroit Mercy, Detroit Institute of Arts, Detroit Regional Chamber, Detroit Zoo, Downtown Detroit Partnership, Foundation for Detroit’s Future, Business Leaders for Michigan, Citizens Research Council, Cultural Alliance of Southeastern Michigan, and St. Johnsbury Academy.

He was instrumental in starting the HOPE (Helping Others through Partnerships and Education) Fund at the Community Foundation for Southeast Michigan that provides grants and technical support to LGBTQ individuals and families.

== Awards and honors ==
- Distinguished Service Citation Award, Automotive Hall of Fame, 2007
- Michiganian of the Year, 2011
- Detroit Free Press Neal Shine Award, 2012
- Gilmour Mall, formerly Perry Mall, Wayne State University, renamed in his honor, 2013
- John Phillips Award, Phillips Exeter Academy, the highest award given by his prep school alma mater, 2018
- Allan D. Gilmour Award for Outstanding Leadership in Inclusion, presented by The Detroit Regional LGBT Chamber of Commerce, 2019
- Lifetime Humanitarian Award, State of Michigan, 2019

Preceded by Jay Noren	President of Wayne State University; 2011-2013	Succeeded by M. Roy Wilson
