= Eldon L. Johnson =

American college president (1908–2002)

10th President of the University of New Hampshire
- In office 1955–1961
- Preceded by: Robert F. Chandler
- Succeeded by: John W. McConnell

Personal details
- Born: November 5, 1908 Putnam, Indiana, US
- Died: March 24, 2002 (aged 93) Urbana, Illinois, US

Eldon Lee Johnson (November 5, 1908 – March 24, 2002) was an American college president. He was the tenth President of the University of New Hampshire from 1955 to 1961. Johnson oversaw significant growth at UNH, including the construction of eight major buildings

Johnson and the board of trustees of the University System of New Hampshire received the first Alexander Meiklejohn Award, given by the American Association of University Professors for the defense of academic freedom and free speech.

UNH named the 667 seat Johnson Theater located within the Paul Creative Arts Center in his honor

== Selected works ==
From Riot to Reason, University of Illinois Press, 1971
Academic adventures in Africa, 1999
