= Kimberly Andrews Espy =

American neuropsychologist and former academic administrator

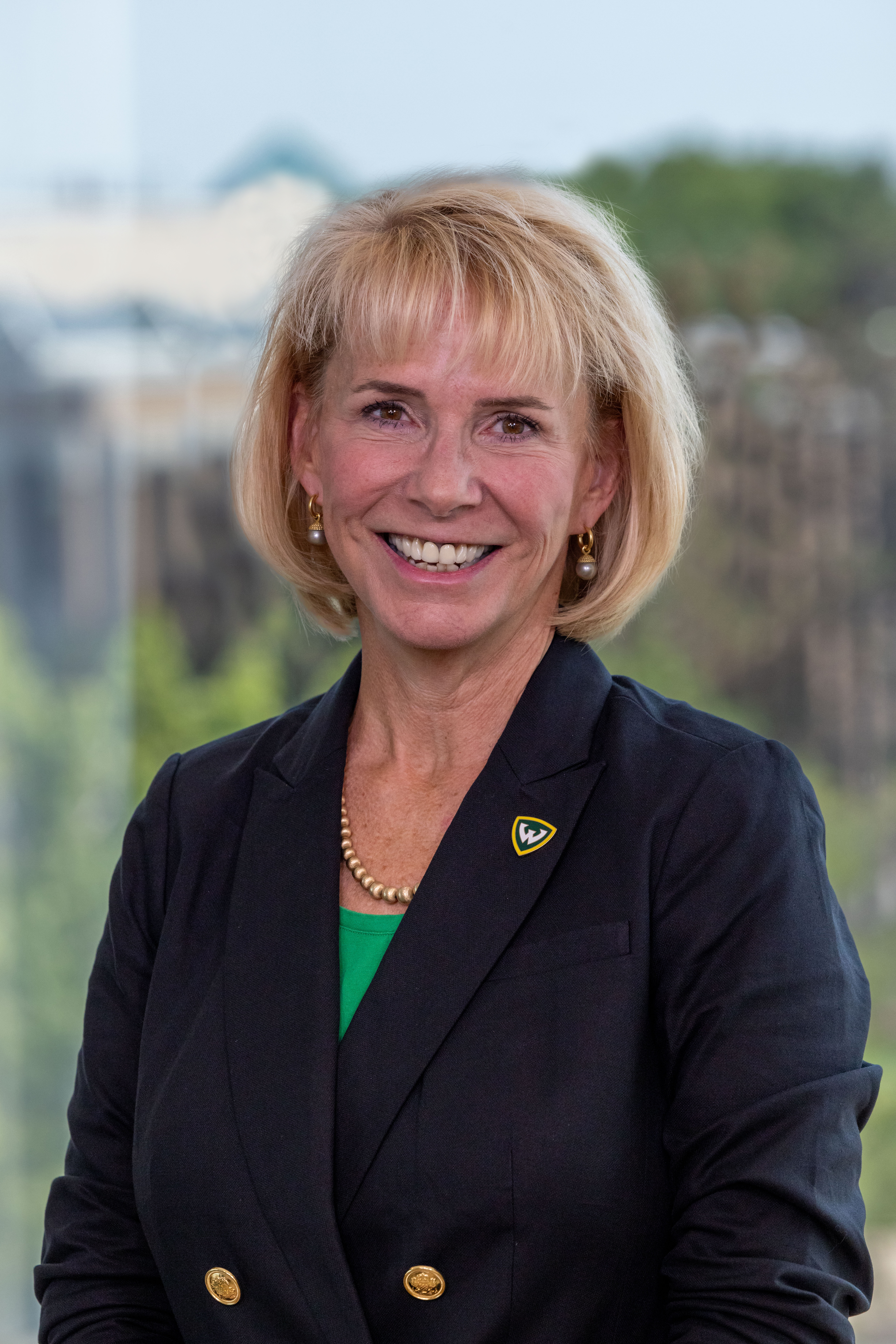
- Espy in 2023

13th President of Wayne State University
- In office August 1, 2023 – September 17, 2025
- Preceded by: M. Roy Wilson
- Succeeded by: Richard Bierschbach (interim)

Personal details
- Education: Rice University (BA); University of Houston (MA, PhD)
- Scientific career
- Fields: Neuroscience
- Workplaces: University of Texas at San Antonio; University of Oregon; Wayne State University
- Thesis: Neurobehavioral development in preterm infants prenatally exposed to cocaine (1994)

Kimberly Andrews Espy is an American neuropsychologist and former academic administrator. She was the first woman to serve as President of Wayne State University during her tenure from August 2023 to September 2025, when she resigned following criticism from Wayne State faculty and students (see § Controversy and Wayne State resignation).

== Early life and education ==
Espy was born and raised in Cincinnati. She graduated from Cincinnati Country Day School in 1981 and was a National Merit Scholar. Espy completed a Bachelor of Arts in psychology at Rice University in 1985. Following this, she received a Master of Arts in 1988 and a Doctor of Philosophy in 1994, both in clinical neuropsychology and from the University of Houston. She then became a postdoctoral researcher at the University of Arizona College of Medicine from 1994 to 1996. During her studies, Espy's research focused on the impact of cocaine and pregnancy.

== Career ==
Upon completing her postdoctoral studies, Espy accepted a professorship at Southern Illinois University School of Medicine. Upon joining the faculty in 1996 as an associate professor, Espy began to study the impact of smoking and pregnancy instead of cocaine. She also led a five-year research project investigating how preschoolers developed self-control. In 2005, Espy left Southern Illinois University to become the associate vice chancellor for research at the University of Nebraska–Lincoln (UNL). She also served as acting dean of UNL's Graduate Studies and directed the school's Developmental Cognitive Neuroscience Lab. In 2008, Espy helped UNL secure a National Science Foundation's ADVANCE program grant to recruit, promote and retain female faculty in the STEM fields. After six years at UNL, Espy became the vice president for research and innovation at the University of Oregon.

Espy worked at the University of Oregon from 2011 until 2014. While at the University of Oregon, she led a partnership to establish the South Willamette Valley Regional Accelerator and Innovation Network and secured its initial state funding. In 2014, Espy returned to her alma mater, the University of Arizona, as their senior vice president for research.

Espy left Arizona in 2018 to become the Provost and Vice President for Academic Affairs at the University of Texas at San Antonio (UTSA). As UTSA, Espy oversaw the establishment of the Najim Center for Innovation and Career Advancement and the opening of the San Pedro 1 Building, housing UTSA's School for Data Science.

On August 1, 2023, Espy became the first woman to serve as president of Wayne State University.

== Controversy and Wayne State resignation ==
On May 29, 2024, Espy authorized a police raid of a pro-Palestinean student encampment, leading to the arrest of at least 11 students and the alleged removal of a student's hijab by Wayne State Police. Espy was criticized by the Wayne State chapter of Students for Justice in Palestine, and by local media for authorizing the use of police force on Wayne State University students. Her decision sparked further protests by student organizations, many of which demanded her resignation.

On September 12, 2025, Espy removed School of Medicine Dean Dr. Wael Sakr from office without formal explanation, evoking criticism from Wayne State students, faculty, and the Wayne State Board of Governors.

On September 17, 2025, Espy resigned as President of Wayne State University following a leaked plan from the Board of Governors for her dismissal from office.
