= Richard Bierschbach =

American legal scholar

Richard A. Bierschbach

President of Wayne State University
- Incumbent
- Assumed office September 17, 2025
- Preceded by: Kimberly Andrews Espy

Dean of the Wayne State University Law School
- Incumbent
- Assumed office August 17, 2017
- Preceded by: Jocelyn Benson

Personal details
- Born: Michigan, U.S.
- Spouse: Carina Villinger
- Children: 2
- Education: University of Michigan (BA, JD)

Richard A. Bierschbach is the 14th president of Wayne State University. He previously served as dean and professor of law at Wayne State University Law School.

== Career ==
Bierschbach became Wayne Law's 12th dean on August 17, 2017. He previously taught at Yeshiva University Benjamin N. Cardozo School of Law in New York, where he also served as vice dean. On Feb. 24, 2026, the Wayne State University Board of Governors elected him as the institution's 14th president; he had previously been serving as interim president since the September 2025 resignation of past president Kimberly Andrews Espy.

Bierschbach received his bachelor's in history (summa cum laude) from the University of Michigan and his J.D. from the University of Michigan Law School., where he won the Daniel H. Grady Prize for graduating first in his class and the Henry M. Bates Award, the law school's highest honor. Before entering academia, Bierschbach was a law clerk for Judge A. Raymond Randolph of the United States Court of Appeals for the District of Columbia Circuit (1997–98) and for Justice Sandra Day O'Connor of the Supreme Court of the United States (2000–01). Between those clerkships, he served as a Bristow Fellow in the U.S. Department of Justice’s Office of the Solicitor General and an attorney-advisor in the Justice Department's Office of Legal Counsel. He has also worked in the New York offices of three international law firms—Wilmer, Cutler & Pickering (now WilmerHale), Gibson, Dunn & Crutcher, and Orrick, Herrington & Sutcliffe—as a member of their Supreme Court and appellate litigation practices.

Bierschbach's teaching and research interests are in criminal law and procedure, administrative and regulatory law, and corporations (especially corporate, white-collar and regulatory crime). His scholarship explores how the criminal justice system's institutional and procedural structure intersects with its substantive and regulatory aims. His work has appeared in numerous leading law journals, including the Yale Law Journal, the Michigan Law Review, the Virginia Law Review, the University of Pennsylvania Law Review, the Northwestern University Law Review, and the Georgetown Law Journal, among others. While at Cardozo, he twice received the Best Professor Award from the law school's graduating class.

Bierschbach has held various leadership positions within the American Bar Association and is an elected member of the American Law Institute and a Fellow of the American Bar Foundation.

== Personal life ==
Bierschbach and his wife, Carina, have two children.

== See also ==
- List of law clerks for the eighth seat of the Supreme Court of the United States

== Selected publications ==
- Bierschbach, Richard A. (2017). "Fragmentation and Democracy in the Constitutional Law of Punishment". Nw. U. L. Rev. 111 (6): 1437.
