= Irvin Reid =

American academic (born 1941)

Irvin D. Reid (born February 20, 1941) is an American educator, the first African-American president of Wayne State University, and the ninth president. He was born on Pawleys Island, South Carolina, to Joseph Reid and Etta Louise. He has psychology degrees from Howard University and business degrees from the Wharton School. His wife, Pamela Reid, was president of the University of Saint Joseph; they have two children, Nicole Reid Gore and Dexter Reid. Irvin Reid has been on the Board of the Federal Reserve Bank of Chicago, and is a member of the Detroit Economic Club. In 2005, he bestowed an honorary degree on Carl Levin.

Under Reid's leadership Wayne State University significantly increased the size of its endowment. Also during his administration Wayne State organized athletic broadcasting agreements and created better systems to improve the academic standings of athletes.

Prior to being president of Wayne State Reid was president of Montclair State University in New Jersey.

Preceded by David Adamany	President of Wayne State University; 1997–2008	Succeeded by Jay Noren
