= David Adamany Undergraduate Library =

Coordinates: 42°21′23.4″N 83°4′13.3″W

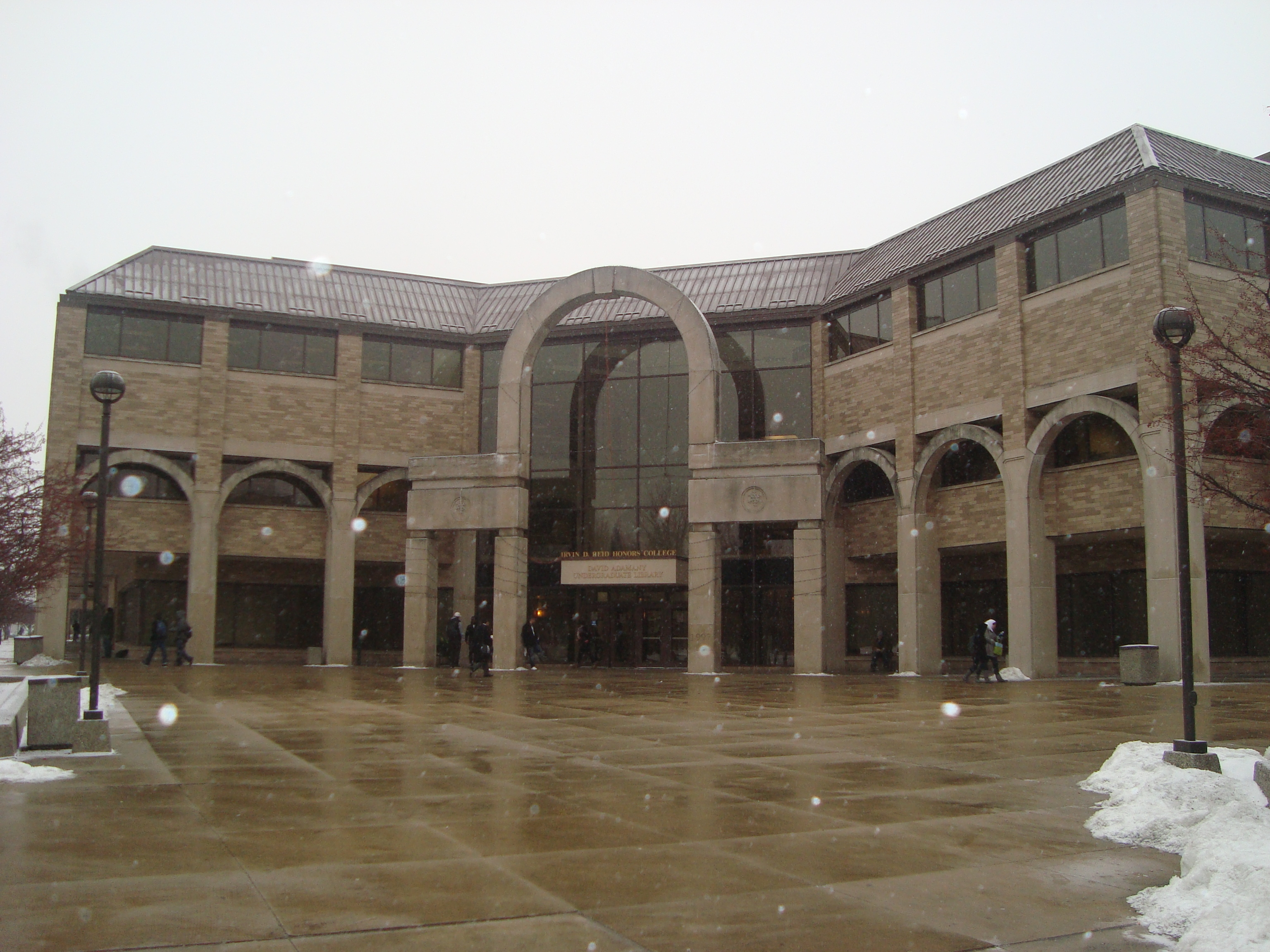
David Adamany Undergraduate Library

David Adamany Undergraduate Library (UGL) is one of Wayne State University’s largest libraries built in 1997 named after the university's 8th president, David Adamany.

== Introduction ==
The David Adamany Undergraduate Library alone provides 2,337 seats, 27 group study rooms, and 3 instruction labs. It has over 500 computer workstations providing students with access to electronic resources. The learning needs of 1000 and 2000 level undergraduate courses are intended to be supported with a wide variety of books and magazines. The library also contains the DeRoy Extended Study Center providing 24-hour access to 140 standard workstations as well as 30 work stations. Also, approximately 8000 videos, DVDs, laser discs and audiotapes are in the media collection. The Undergraduate Library also provides students with information on careers, computers, and student survival skills.

In the Association of Research Libraries, Wayne State University libraries rank among the top 60 libraries.

== Location ==
David Adamany Undergraduate Library is located at 5150 Anthony Wayne in Detroit, Michigan. Within the Wayne State University campus, it is situated at the center of Gullen Mall.

== History ==
David Adamany faced a lot of adversity when he first came up with the idea of an undergraduate library in 1982. Adamany looked at the libraries that existed at Wayne State. Not only did he see a need for additional space and further collection development, he saw an opportunity. A library just for undergrads was a new concept. Adamany and library administration persevered through the years and worked to make the undergraduate library a reality. Over ten years after the idea was introduced in May 1986, ground was broken on February 2, 1996, in front of a substantial crowd in sub-zero degree temperatures. From there, things moved quickly. Construction took less than two years and staff worked hard to prepare for the September 1997 opening of the UGL with an interior size of 300.000 square feet.

== Art at Adamany ==
The Wayne State University Art Collection has grown to include nearly 6000 works of art.

== Within the UGL ==
=== First floor ===
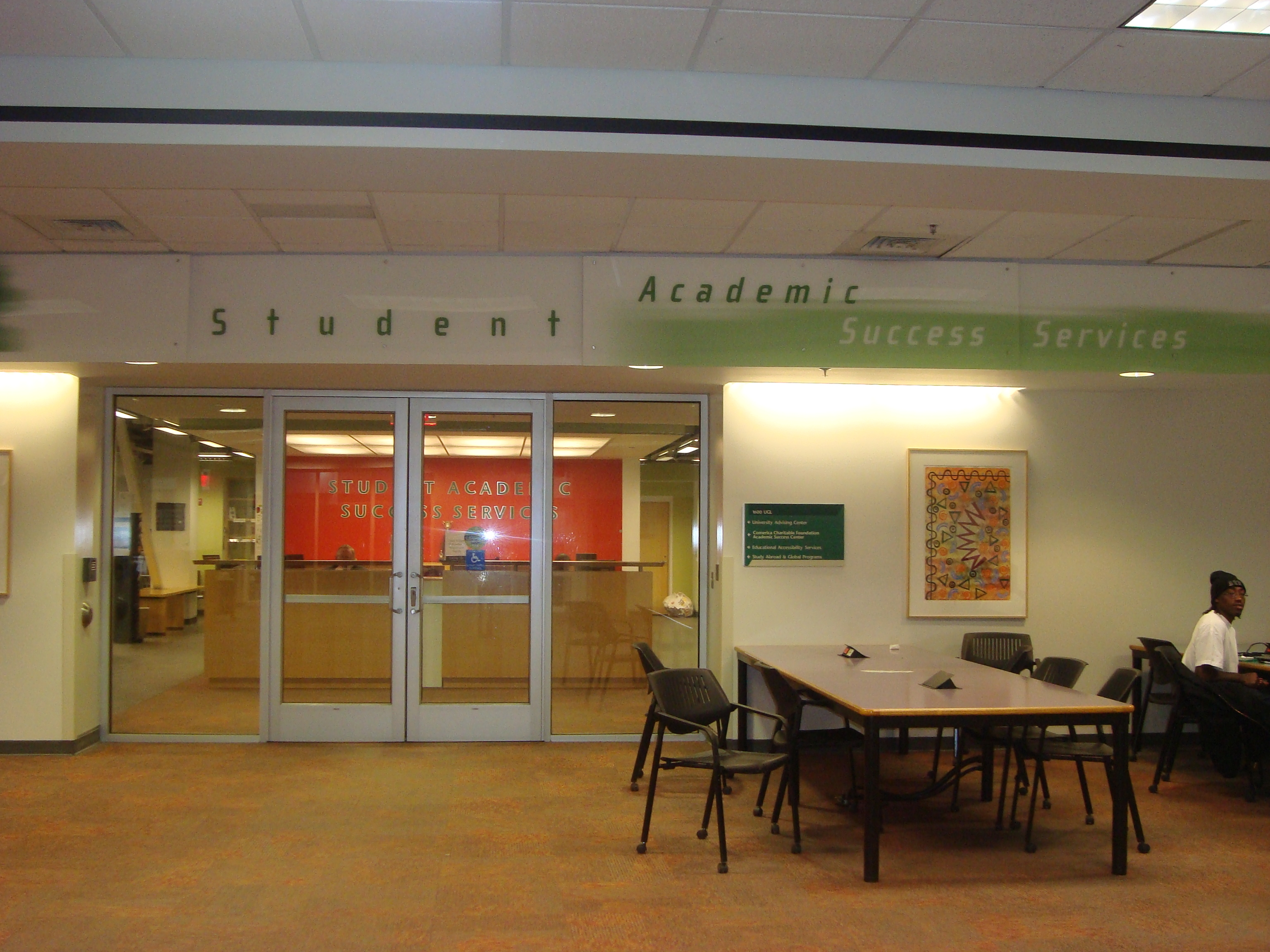
Academic advising

- Information Desk
- Advising Office
- Helen L. DeRoy Extended Hours Study Center
  The center provides 24-hour study area with computer workstations, printers, scanners, study tables, and help desk support. The computer support center is also located within this section of the library.

=== Second floor ===
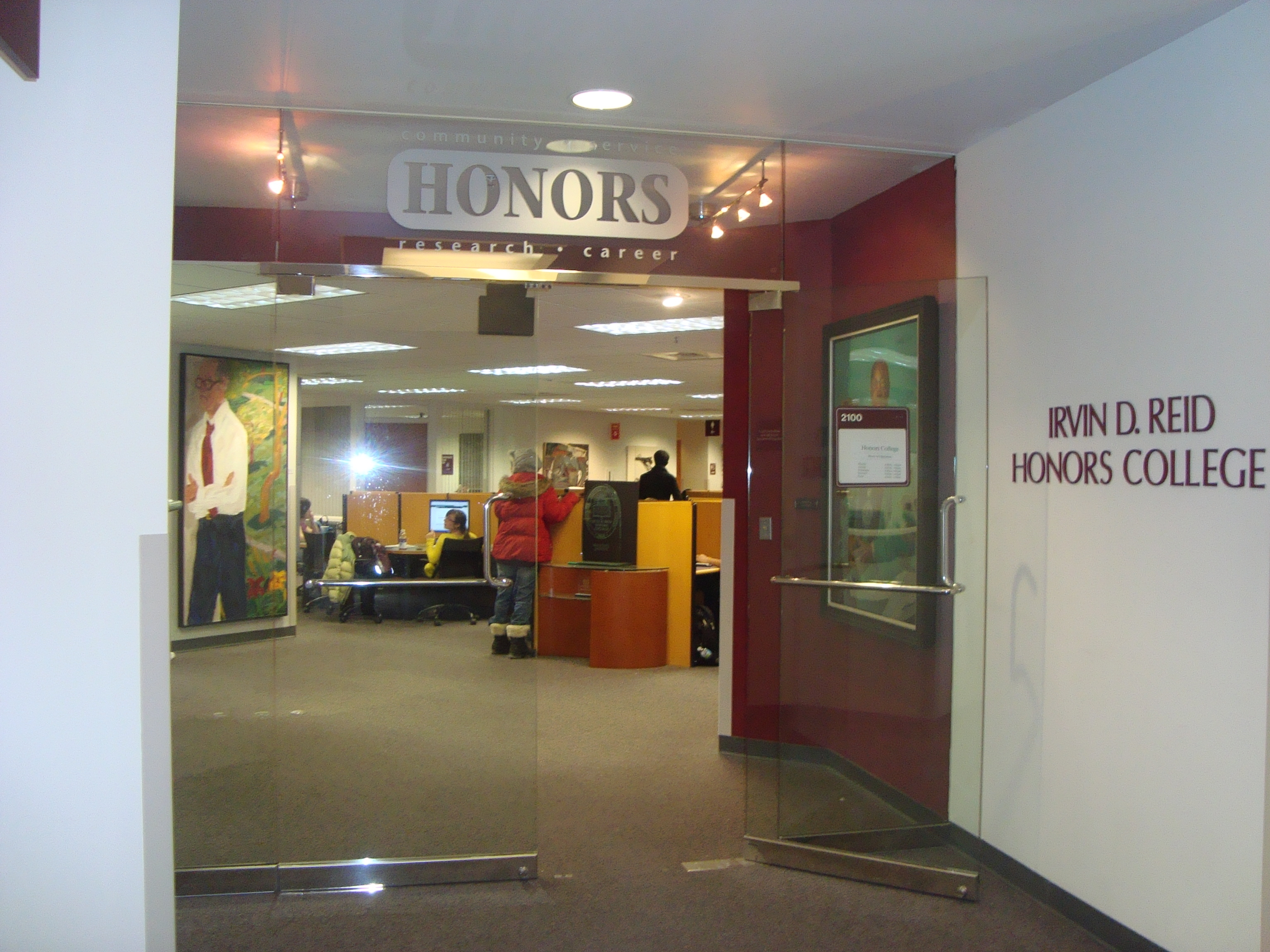
Irvin D. Reid Honors College

- Collaborative Study Rooms
  Located in the study room are large white boards as well as glass windows where students can physically write upon them with dry erase markers, which are provided at the front desk of the UGL. Computer workstations and printers are also provided, but outside the study rooms.
- Books, Magazines, and VHS
- Student Technology Studio
  The center helps provides technology equipment and software for individual or small groups of students to use in creating multimedia projects, assignments or other course related activities.
- Writing Center
  The writing center serves as a supportive resource for students who want to become better writers. Peer tutors work with students writing in all disciplines.
- Honors College
  The Irvin D. Reid Honors College is the major department within the UGL. Honors is a home to more than 1,300 students who may choose their major from among the 126 bachelor's degrees offered by the university.

=== Third floor ===
- Office of the Dean
- Collaborative Study Rooms
