= Shereef Akeel =

American lawyer

Governor-elect of Wayne State University
- Assuming office January 1, 2027
- Succeeding: Bryan Barnhill; Anil Kumar

Personal details
- Born: April 27, 1965 (age 61) Walnut, California, U.S.
- Party: Democratic
- Education: University of Michigan (BS); Wayne State University (MBA); Michigan State University (JD)

Shereef Akeel (born April 27, 1965) is an American lawyer and politician who is a governor-elect of Wayne State University. A member of the Democratic Party, Akeel is notable for pursuing human rights and civil liberties cases.

== Early life and education ==
Shereef Akeel was born on April 27, 1965, in Walnut, California. When Akeel was ten years old his family relocated to Sterling Heights, Michigan, where he spent the remainder of his childhood. Akeel obtained his accounting degree from University of Michigan in 1987, an M.B.A. from Wayne State University in 1992 and a J.D. from Michigan State University College of Law in 1996.

== Career ==
Akeel worked as a Certified Public Accountant through the 1990s, but eventually turned to the legal profession. After obtaining his J.D. degree, he became an associate at the law firm of Melamed, Dailey, and Akeel in 1996, becoming a full partner in 2000. Reflecting his business background, his original specialties were property insurance, contract law, and personal injury law, and did not become involved in civil rights law until 2001.

However, his focus changed after the attacks of September 11. By his account, a Yemeni American man approached him on September 12, alleging that his employer had summarily fired him, saying "Get out of here. Go tell your leader we don't want you." Since then, Akeel has been representing people in Metro Detroit who alleged discrimination and specializes in employment and civil rights law. These efforts made national news when he filed a class action lawsuit on behalf of former detainees of Abu Ghraib as well as other detention centers. In March 2004, Akeel was asked to represent a former detainee of Abu Ghraib prison who claimed he had been abused and tortured by American soldiers and civilians hired by the U.S. Army. After reports of abuse began to surface, the US government asked Army major General Antonio Taguba to spearhead a full investigation. In addition to abuse reports, the investigation concluded that two agencies hired by the US government participated and or encouraged the abuses at the Prison. In June 2007, Akeel brought a class action lawsuit against CACI International Inc. and Titan Corp. These two agencies were hired by the U.S. Army to provide translation and interrogation services.

Besides his direct legal work, Akeel has been active in civil liberties advocacy, serving on the board of the Oakland County chapter of the American Civil Liberties Union since 2004.

Akeel had been named as a "Lawyer of the year" for 2004, and "Michigan Super lawyer" for 11 consecutive years from 2006 to 2017
