= Eugene G. Sander =

American academic (1935–2026)

- Born: September 17, 1935
- Died: February 22, 2026 (aged 90)
- Spouse: Louise M. Canfield

Academic background
- Education: University of Minnesota (B.S.) (1957, Science Special – Animal Science); Cornell University (M.S. (Animal Nutrition), PhD. Biochemistry) (1959, 1965)

Notes
- ,

Eugene G. Sander (September 17, 1935 – February 22, 2026) was an American academic who was president of the University of Arizona, serving from 2011 to 2012. He was appointed after the resignation of Robert N. Shelton to lead the Fiesta Bowl.

== Life and career ==
Sander had been vice provost and dean of the UA's College of Agriculture and Life Sciences prior to deferring his retirement to become president. He died on February 22, 2026, at the age of 90.
