= Gellan tetrasaccharide unsaturated glucuronyl hydrolase =

Identifiers
- EC no.: 3.2.1.179

Databases
- IntEnz: IntEnz view
- BRENDA: BRENDA entry
- ExPASy: NiceZyme view
- KEGG: KEGG entry
- MetaCyc: metabolic pathway
- PRIAM: profile
- PDB structures: RCSB PDB PDBe PDBsum
Search
- PMC: articles
- PubMed: articles
- NCBI: proteins

Gellan tetrasaccharide unsaturated glucuronyl hydrolase (EC 3.2.1.179, UGL, unsaturated glucuronyl hydrolase) is an enzyme with systematic name beta-D-4-deoxy-Delta4-GlcAp-(1->4)-beta-D-Glcp-(1->4)-alpha-L-Rhap-(1->3)-beta-D-Glcp beta-D-4-deoxy-Delta4-GlcAp hydrolase. This enzyme catalyses the following chemical reaction

β-ᴅ-4-deoxy-Δ⁴-GlcAp-(1→4)-β-ᴅ-Glcp-(1→4)-α-ʟ-Rhap-(1→3)-β-ᴅ-Glcp + H_{2}O $\rightleftharpoons$ 5-dehydro-4-deoxy-D-glucuronate + β-ᴅ-Glcp-(1→4)-α-ʟ-Rhap-(1→3)-β-ᴅ-Glcp

The enzyme releases 4-deoxy-4(5)-unsaturated D-glucuronic acid from oligosaccharides produced by polysaccharide lyases.
