= Unsaturated chondroitin disaccharide hydrolase =

Class of enzymes

Identifiers
- EC no.: 3.2.1.180

Databases
- IntEnz: IntEnz view
- BRENDA: BRENDA entry
- ExPASy: NiceZyme view
- KEGG: KEGG entry
- MetaCyc: metabolic pathway
- PRIAM: profile
- PDB structures: RCSB PDB PDBe PDBsum
Search
- PMC: articles
- PubMed: articles
- NCBI: proteins

Unsaturated chondroitin disaccharide hydrolase (EC 3.2.1.180, UGL, unsaturated glucuronyl hydrolase) is an enzyme with systematic name beta-D-4-deoxy-Delta4-GlcAp-(1->3)-beta-D-GalNAc6S hydrolase. This enzyme catalyses the following chemical reaction

beta-D-4-deoxy-Delta4-GlcAp-(1->3)-beta-D-GalNAc6S + H_{2}O $\rightleftharpoons$ 5-dehydro-4-deoxy-D-glucuronate + N-acetyl-beta-D-galactosamine-6-O-sulfate

The enzyme releases 4-deoxy-4,5-didehydro D-glucuronic acid or 4-deoxy-4,5-didehydro L-iduronic acid from chondroitin disaccharides, hyaluronan disaccharides and heparin disaccharides.
