= Wayne State University =

Public university in Detroit, Michigan, U.S.

Coordinates: 42°21′26.44″N 83°4′12.38″W

- Former names: List: Detroit Medical College (1868–1933); Detroit Normal Training School for Teachers (1881–1920); Detroit Teachers College (1920–1924); College of the City of Detroit (1924–1933); Detroit Junior College (1917–1933); Detroit City Law School (1927–1933); Wayne University (1933–1956)
- Motto: "Industry, Intelligence, Integrity"
- Type: Public research university
- Established: 1868; 158 years ago
- Accreditation: HLC
- Endowment: $636 million (2025)
- President: Richard Bierschbach
- Provost: Keith Whitfield (interim)
- Faculty: 2,320
- Administrative staff: 5,348
- Students: 24,168 (2025)
- Undergraduates: 16,173 (2024)
- Postgraduates: 7,791 (2024)
- Location: Detroit, Michigan, United States
- Campus: 203 acres (0.82 km^{2}); Large city
- Other campuses: Clinton Township; Livonia; Warren
- Newspaper: The South End
- Colors: Green and gold
- Nickname: Warriors
- Sporting affiliations: NCAA Division II – GLIAC; CCFC
- Mascot: "W" the Warrior
- Website: wayne.edu

Wayne State University (WSU) is a public research university in Detroit, Michigan, United States. Founded in 1868, Wayne State consists of 13 schools and colleges offering approximately 375 programs. It is Michigan's third-largest university, with nearly 25,000 graduate and undergraduate students.

Wayne State University, along with Michigan State University, Michigan Technological University, and the University of Michigan, comprise Michigan's University Research Corridor. Wayne State is classified among "R1: Doctoral Universities – Very high research activity".

Wayne State's main campus comprises 203 acres linking more than 100 education and research buildings. It also has three satellite campuses in Macomb and Wayne counties. The Wayne State Warriors compete in the NCAA Division II Great Lakes Intercollegiate Athletic Conference (GLIAC).

== History ==
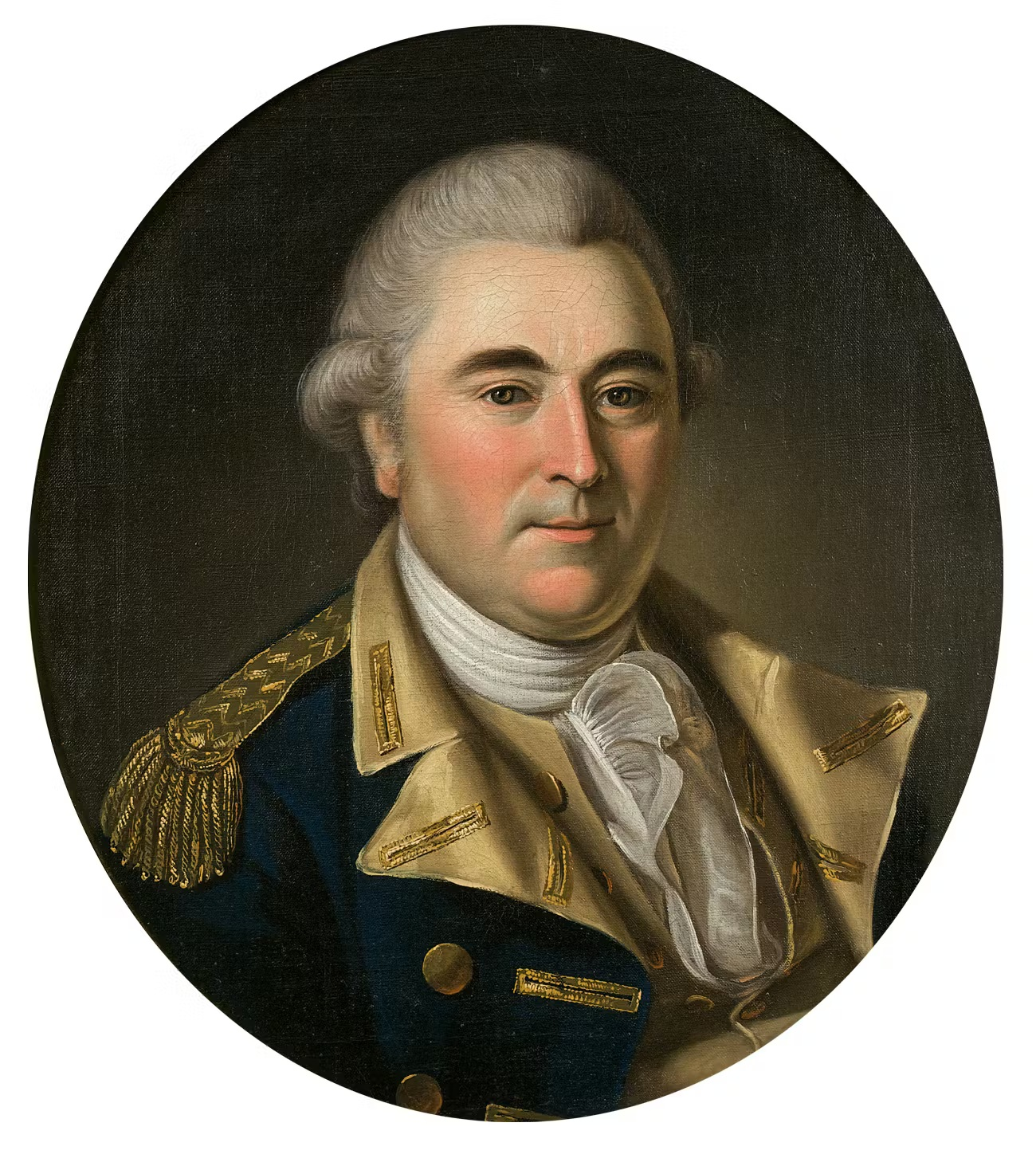
Anthony Wayne, the university's namesake

Wayne State University was established in 1868 as the Detroit Medical College by five returning Civil War veterans. The college charter from 1868 was signed by founder Theodore Andrews McGraw, M.D., a University of Michigan graduate (B.A. 1859). In 1885, the Detroit College of Medicine merged with its competitor, the Michigan College of Medicine and they consolidated buildings. After the reorganization, McGraw became the first president and dean. The institutions evolved into the Wayne State University School of Medicine.

In 1881, the Detroit Normal Training School for Teachers was established by the Detroit Board of Education. In 1920, after several relocations to larger quarters, the school became the Detroit Teachers College. The Board of Education voted in 1924 to make the college a part of the new College of the City of Detroit. Eventually it became the Wayne State University College of Education.

In 1917, the Detroit Board of Education founded the Detroit Junior College and would make Detroit Central High School's Old Main Hall its campus. Detroit's College of Pharmacy and the Detroit Teachers College were added to the campus in 1924, and were organized into the College of the City of Detroit. The original junior college became the College of Liberal Arts. The first bachelor's degrees were awarded in 1925. The College of Liberal Arts of the College of the City of Detroit became the Wayne State University College of Liberal Arts and Sciences.

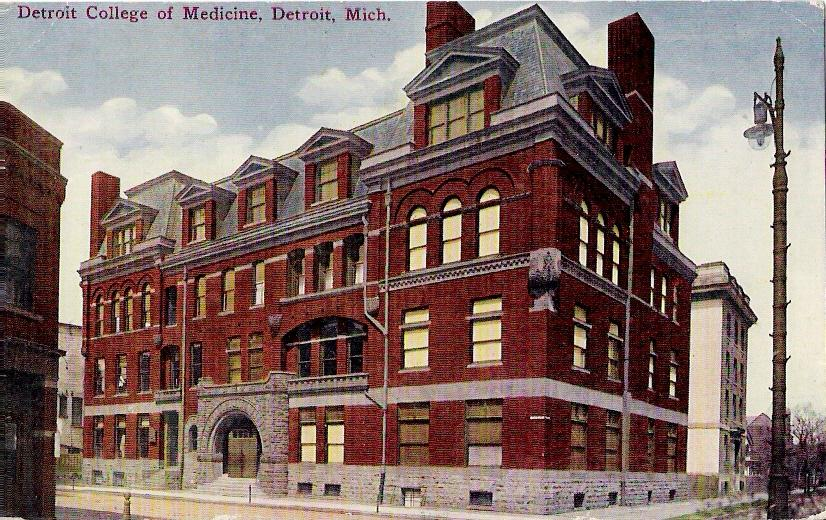
Detroit College of Medicine, c. 1911

Recognizing the need for a good law school, a group of lawyers, including Allan Campbell, the school's founding dean, established Detroit City Law School in 1927 as part of the College of the City of Detroit. Originally structured as a part-time evening program, the school's first class graduated with the bachelor of laws degree (LL.B.) in 1928 and achieved full American Bar Association accreditation in 1939. The school became Wayne State University Law School.

In 1933, the Detroit Board of Education voted to unify its colleges into a university. In January 1934, that institution was officially named Wayne University, taking its name from Wayne County (in which both the university and the city of Detroit reside), which was itself named after Anthony Wayne, a notable major general in the Continental Army during the Revolutionary War. Wayne University added a School of Social Work in 1935, and the School of Business Administration in 1946. Wayne University was renamed Wayne State University in 1956 and the institution became mandated by an amendment to the Michigan Constitution in 1959. The Wayne State University Board of Governors created the Institute of Gerontology in 1965 in response to a State of Michigan mandate. The institute's primary mission in that era was to engage in research, education and service in the field of aging. Wayne State University in 1973 added the College of Lifelong Learning. In 1985, the School of Fine and the Performing Arts, and the College of Urban, Labor and Metropolitan Affairs further grew the university.

In the early 21st century, WSU constructed the Integrative Biosciences Center (IBio), a 207,000-square-foot (19,200 m^{2}) facility for interdisciplinary work in the biosciences. More than 500 researchers, staff and principal investigators work out of the building, which opened in 2016. In 2013, M. Roy Wilson became Wayne State's 12th president. In 2018, the new Mike Ilitch School of Business facility opened in The District Detroit. Richard Bierschbach was voted in as the 14th president of Wayne State in 2026 after serving as interim president since 2025.

== Campus ==
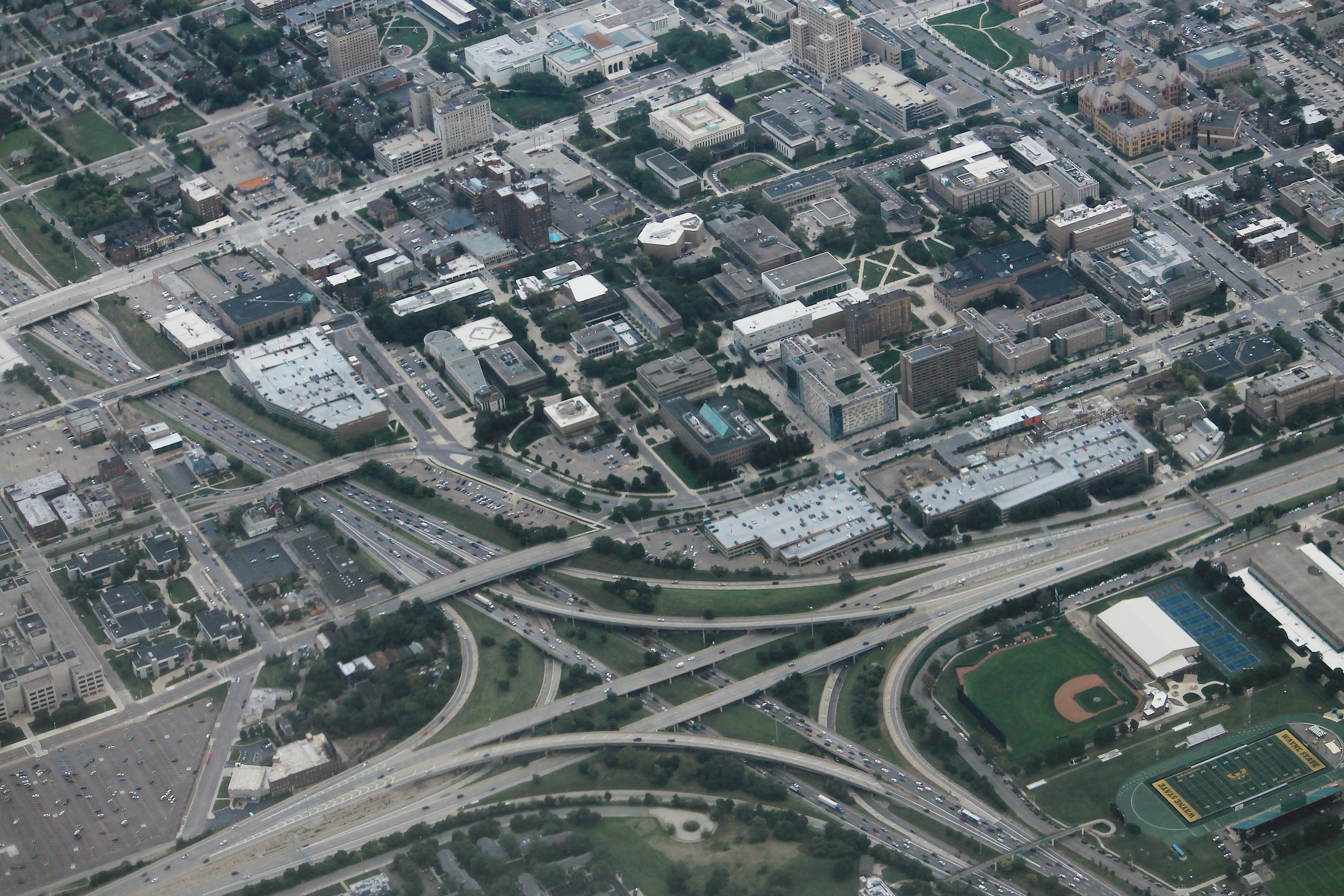
Aerial view of the campus

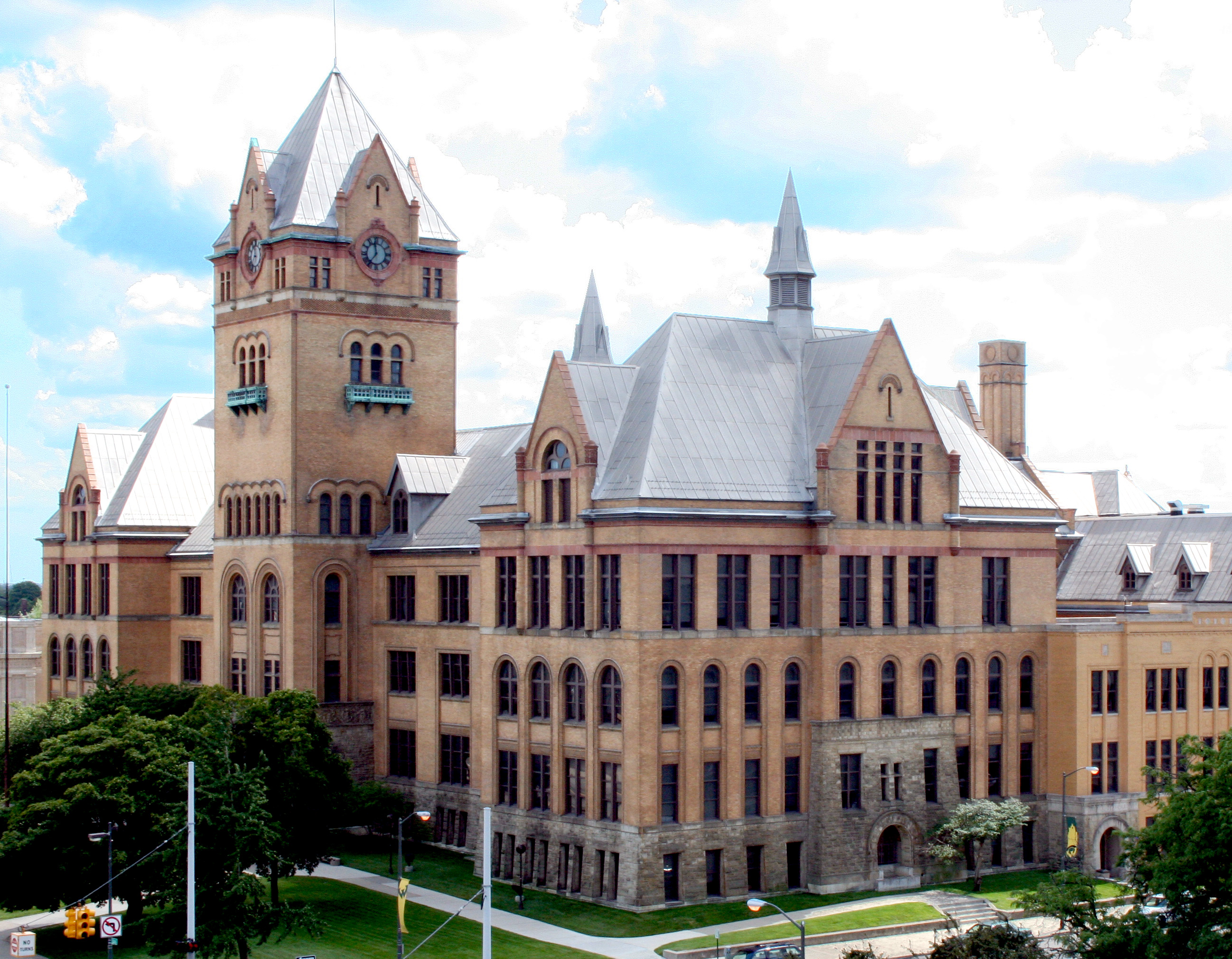
Old Main

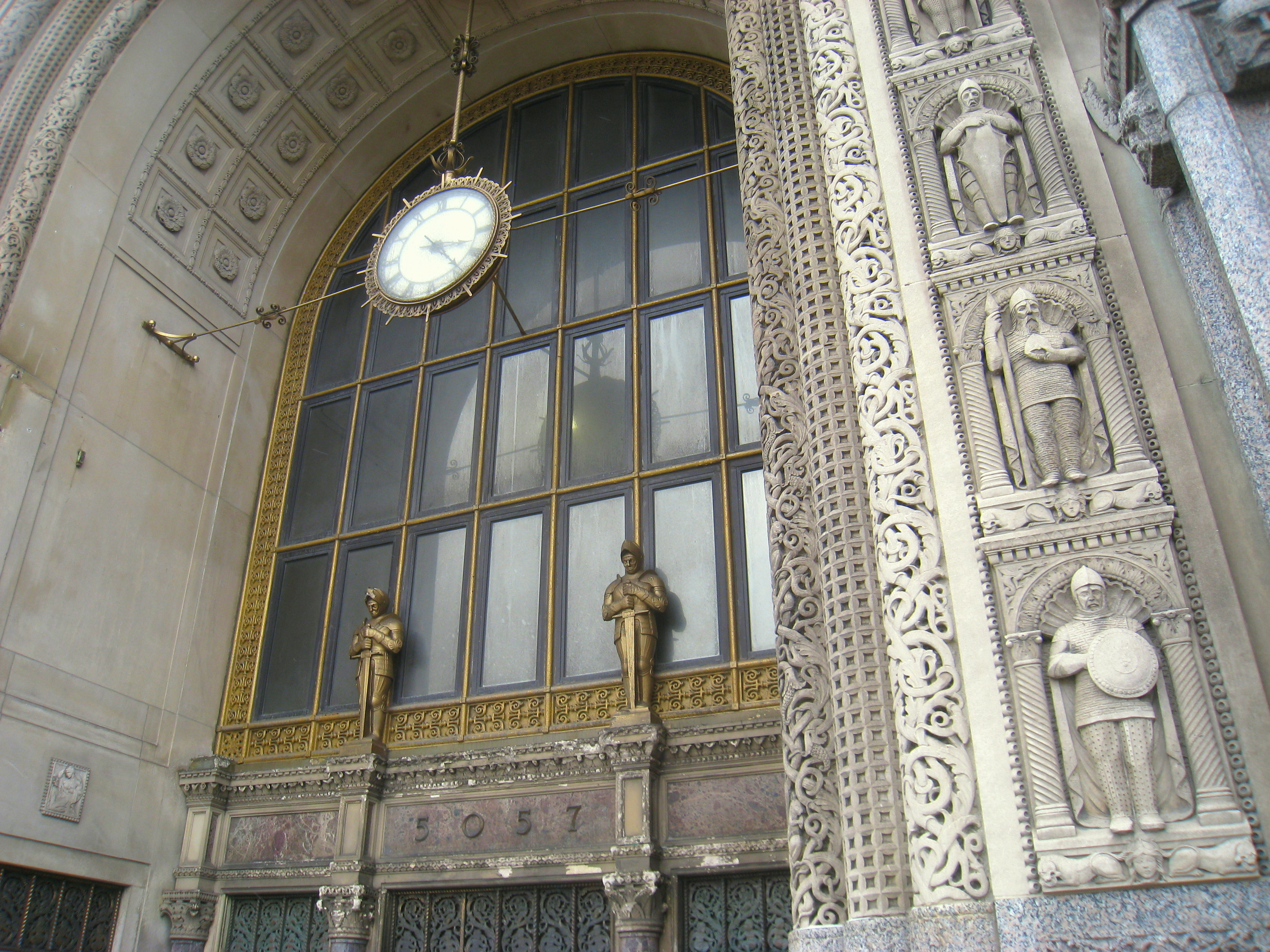
Entrance of the Maccabees Building

Wayne State's main campus in Detroit encompasses 203 acres (0.82 km^{2}) of landscaped walkways and gathering spots linking over 100 education and research buildings. The campus is urban and features many architecturally significant buildings, including the University Auditorium (formerly the Helen L. DeRoy Auditorium the Education Building, the Maccabees Building, Old Main, McGregor Memorial Conference Center, Chatsworth Suites, IBio, STEM Innovation Learning Center, M. Roy Wilson State Hall, Hilberry Gateway and the Gretchen Valade Jazz Center. Many buildings have been designed by notable architects such as Albert Kahn and Minoru Yamasaki.

Wayne State University is located in Midtown Detroit near many notable institutions and attractions. The Cass Corridor is one of the university's notable surroundings. Many events have taken place on or near the campus as a result of its unique location.

=== Tom Adams Field ===
Tom Adams Field is a 6,000-seat football stadium located on the campus. It is primarily used for Wayne State Warriors football of the Great Lakes Intercollegiate Athletic Conference, a Division II conference of the National Collegiate Athletic Association.

The field was named after Thomas B. Adams, a 1944 graduate and football and track athlete who later served on as a board member at WSU. Due to his athletic, military and business achievements, the Wayne State football field was named in honor of him in 2003. A new 35-foot video board was installed in August 2015. The eight-lane Lowell Blanchard Track, located in the stadium, was first installed in 2006. Mondo surfacing was added to the track in 2011.

=== Wayne State Fieldhouse ===
The Wayne State Fieldhouse, a 70,000-square-foot arena with seating for 3,000 fans, opened in October 2021. The arena is home to Wayne State's basketball teams as well as the Detroit Pistons' G League team, the Motor City Cruise.

=== TechTown ===
In 2000, Wayne State, Henry Ford Health and General Motors Co. launched TechTown, a business incubator that works with technology startups and entrepreneurs in Detroit.

=== Satellite campuses ===
Wayne State has three satellite campuses in the Metro Detroit area. The locations are:

- Macomb University Center at Macomb Community College, Clinton Township
- Advanced Technology Education Center, Warren
- Schoolcraft Center at Schoolcraft College, Livonia

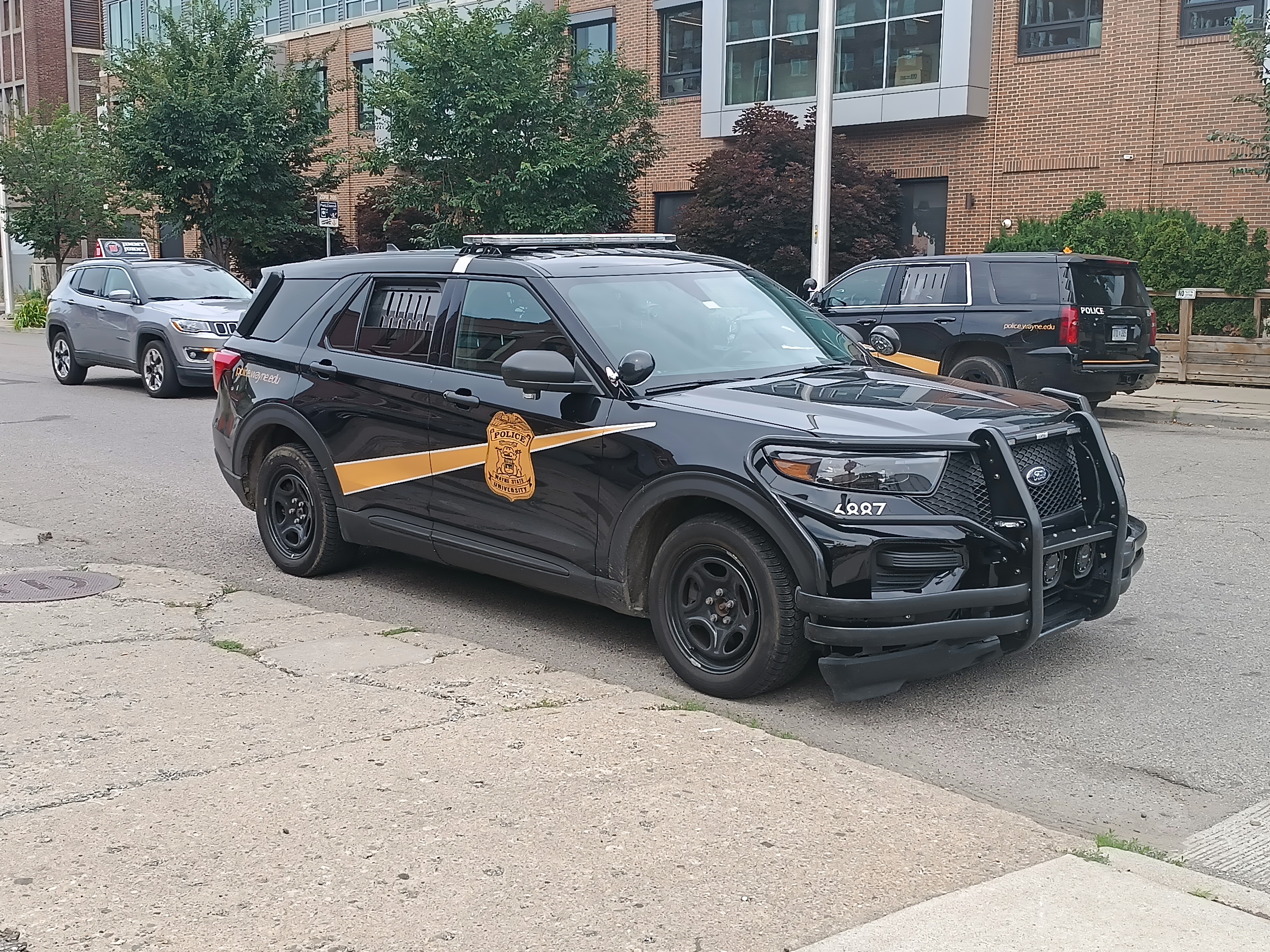
Wayne State University Police Department patrol vehicle

== Organization and administration ==
=== Board of Governors ===
The university is governed by the governors of Wayne State University (collectively known as the Board of Governors), a body of eight elected constitutional officers of the state of Michigan. They are elected in statewide, partisan elections in even-numbered years (two per year), and serve eight-year terms without compensation, like the regents of the University of Michigan and the trustees of Michigan State University. The Board selects the university president, who serves ex officio as the ninth, non-voting member of the Board.

As of 2026, the board consists of five Democrats and three Republicans. The most recent election was held in November 2026; Democrats Shereef Akeel and Richard Mack were elected, and are slated to take office January 1, 2027.

Members of the Board of Governors (as of November 2026)
Name	Start	Next election	Party
Marilyn Kelly	January 1, 2015	2030	Democratic
Michael Busuito	January 1, 2017	2032	Republican
Anil Kumar	January 1, 2019	2026 (declined to run)	Democratic
Bryan Barnhill	January 1, 2019	2026 (declined to run)	Democratic
Shirley Stancato	January 1, 2021	2028	Democratic
Terri Lynn Land	January 1, 2021	2028	Republican
Danielle Atkinson	January 1, 2023	2030	Democratic
Sunny Reddy	January 1, 2025	2032	Republican
Richard Bierschbach, president (ex officio, non-voting)	February 24, 2026		

=== Presidents ===
The following is a list of the presidents of the university since its establishment.

No.	Name	Tenure
1	Frank Cody	1933–1942
2	Warren E. Bow	1942–1945
3	David D. Patrick	1945–1952
4	Clarence B. Hilberry	1952–1965
5	William R. Keast	1965–1971
6	George E. Gullen Jr.	1971–1978
7	Thomas N. Bonner	1978–1982
8	David Adamany	1982–1997
9	Irvin D. Reid	1997–2008
10	Jay Noren	2008–2011
11	Allan Gilmour	2011–2013
12	M. Roy Wilson	2013–2023
13	Kimberly Andrews Espy	2023–2025
14	Richard A. Bierschbach	2026–present

=== Student government ===
The student body government is headed by a Student Senate. Some colleges of the university have their own Student Senate, which reports back to the main Student Senate. The Law School has its own Student Board of Governors.

== Academics ==
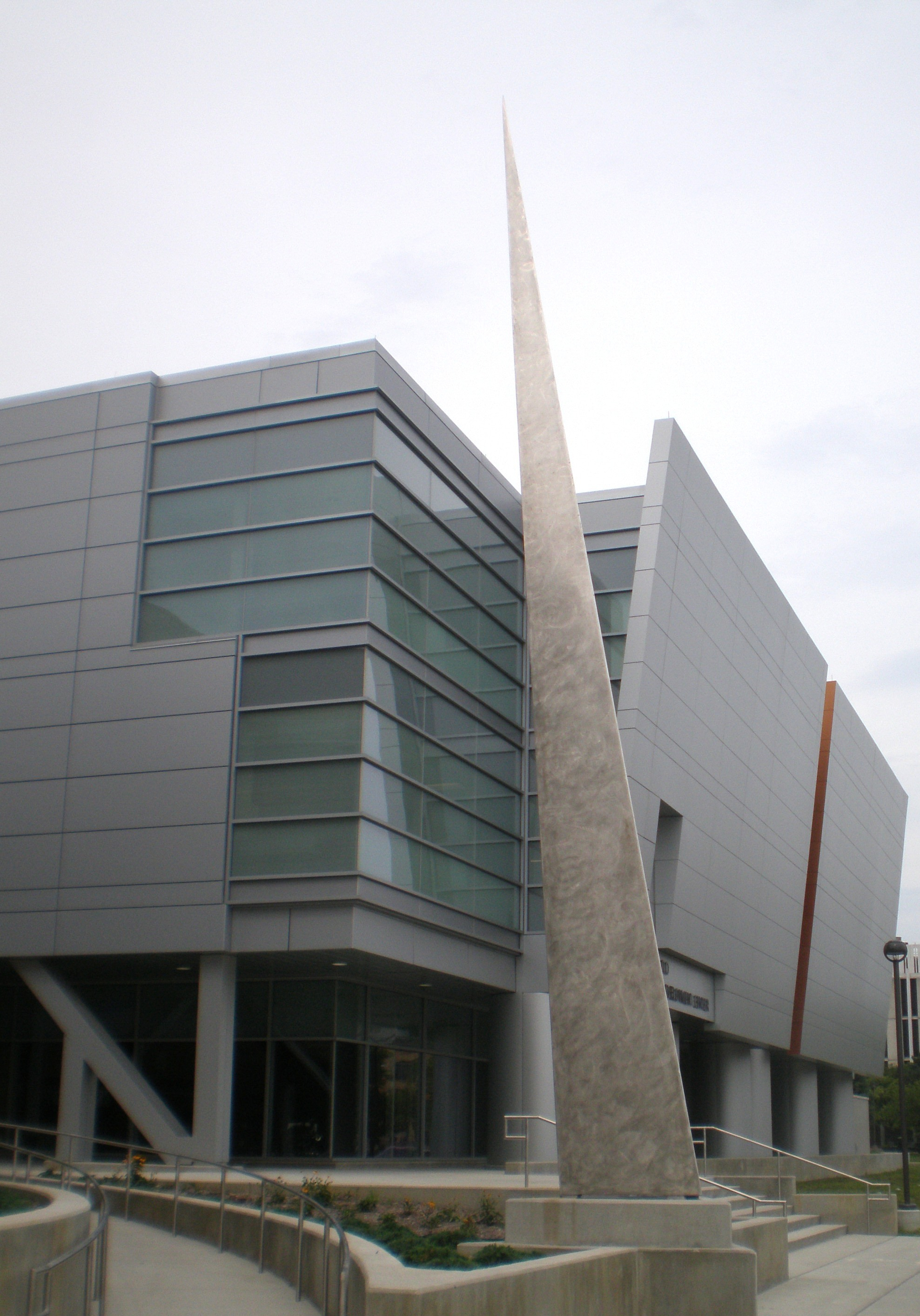
College of Engineering

Wayne State's academic offerings are divided among 13 schools and colleges: the Mike Ilitch School of Business, the College of Education, the College of Engineering; the College of Fine, Performing and Communication Arts; the Graduate School, the Law School, the College of Liberal Arts and Sciences, the School of Information Sciences, the School of Medicine, the College of Nursing, the Eugene Applebaum College of Pharmacy and Health Sciences, the Irvin D. Reid Honors College, and the School of Social Work. Fall 2024 enrollment for the university consisted of 23,964 students; freshman enrollment was approximately 4,700, including nearly 3,100 first-year, first time in any college students, a 2% increase over the fall 2023 class.

Wayne State offers approximately 375 undergraduate, postgraduate, specialist and certificate programs in 13 schools and colleges. Its most popular undergraduate majors by 2024 graduates were:

- Psychology
- Business administration
- Social work
- Medicine (M.D.)
- Public health
- Computer science
- Marketing
- Management
- Finance
- Global supply chain management

=== Schools and colleges ===
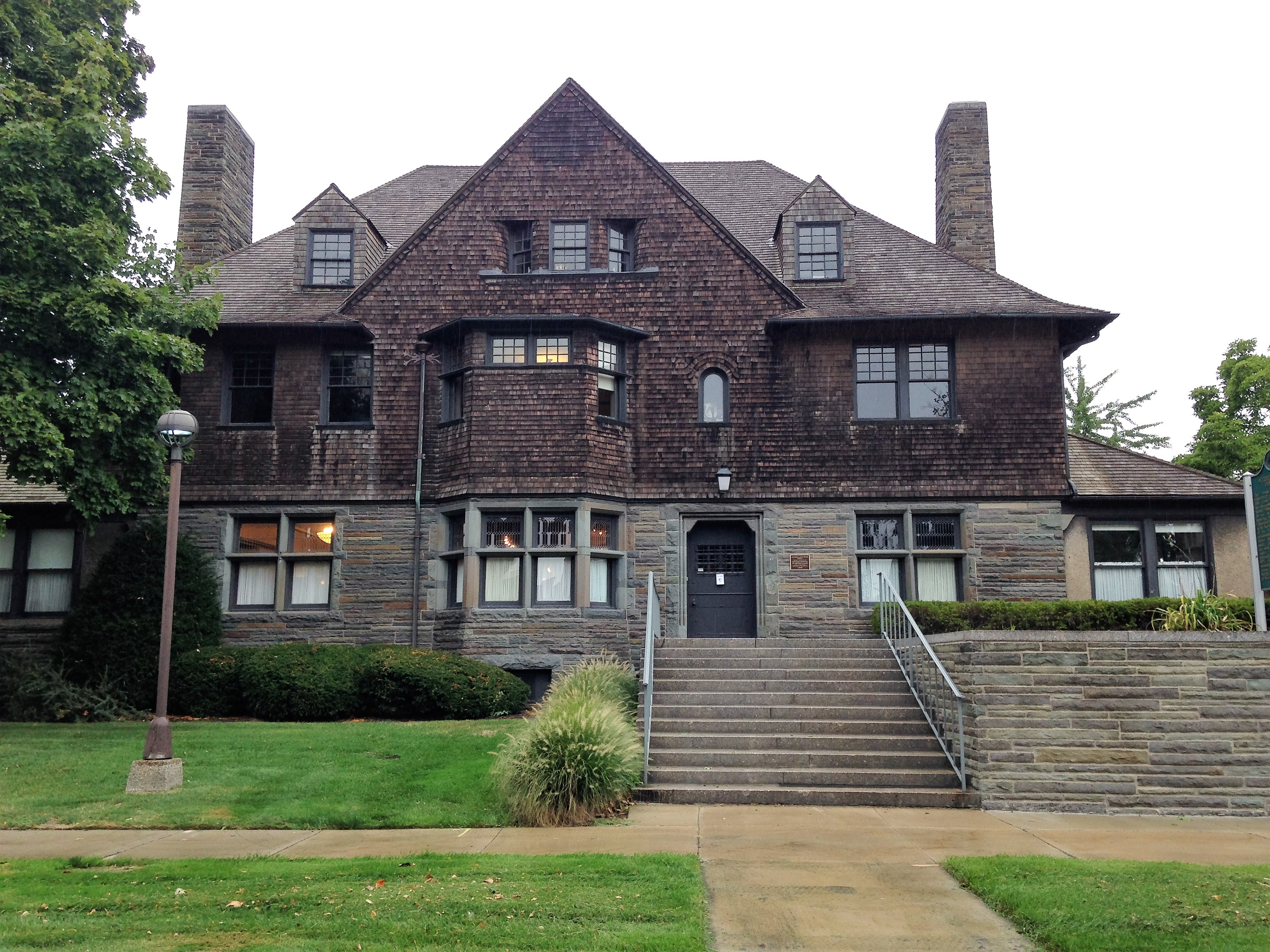
The Charles Lang Freer House houses the Merrill Palmer Skillman Institute of Human Development & Family Life.

Wayne State University is home to 13 schools and colleges offering a wide range of undergraduate, graduate and professional programs across diverse fields of study.

- Mike Ilitch School of Business
- College of Education
- James and Patricia Anderson College of Engineering
- College of Fine, Performing and Communication Arts
- Irvin D. Reid Honors College
- Graduate School
- Law School (Wayne Law)
- College of Liberal Arts and Sciences
- School of Information Sciences
- School of Medicine
- College of Nursing
- Eugene Applebaum College of Pharmacy and Health Sciences
- School of Social Work

The Mike Ilitch School of Business offers undergraduate degrees and graduate degrees, including the M.B.A. and M.S. as well as a Ph.D. The college also offers undergraduate and graduate certificates. The programs are accredited by the Association to Advance Collegiate Schools of Business. Established in 1986, the College of Fine, Performing and Communication Arts (CFPCA) serves over 1,500 students majoring in 14 undergraduate programs and 12 graduate programs. Many programs are nationally accredited.

The American Library Association first accredited the master of library and information science (MLIS) in 1967. The MLIS is available online with select classes also offered on campus. In September 2017, the school became a member of the iSchool Consortium and added a master of science in information management (MSIM).

Founded in 1868, the Wayne State University School of Medicine enrolls more than 1,500 students in its medical, doctoral, M.D./Ph.D., and master’s programs. The school's research emphasizes neurosciences, pediatrics, obstetrics and gynecology, cancer, cardiovascular disease, diabetes and obesity, and psychiatry and addiction research. One of the school's major assets is the Richard J. Mazurek, M.D., Medical Education Commons, which was designed specifically for students and houses classrooms, student services divisions, the medical library and the Kado Family Clinical Skills Center, a sophisticated patient simulation center.

=== Admissions ===
==== Undergraduate ====
Undergraduate admissions statistics
- 2024 entering class
- Admit rate: 77% (▼ −5)
- Yield rate: 22% (▼ −2)

Test scores middle 50%
- SAT Total: 1060–1260 (among 40% of FTFs)
- ACT Composite: 23-29 (among 2% of FTFs)

For the Class of 2028 (enrolled fall 2023), Wayne State received 15,229 applications and accepted 12,401 (82%). Of those accepted, 2,988 enrolled, a yield rate (the percentage of accepted students who choose to attend the university) of 24%. Wayne State's second term retention rate is 92.1%, with 58.4% going on to graduate within six years.

Of the 44% of the incoming freshman class who submitted SAT scores; the middle 50 percent Composite scores were 1000-1199. Of the 4% of enrolled freshmen in 2021 who submitted ACT scores; the middle 50 percent Composite score was between 18 and 29.

Together with Michigan State University, Michigan Technological University, Kalamazoo College, Hillsdale College, Calvin University and Hope College, Wayne State is one of the seven college-sponsors of the National Merit Scholarship Program in the state. The university sponsored 8 Merit Scholarship awards in 2024.

Fall first-time freshman statistics
	2025	2024	2023	2022	2021	2020	2019	2018
Applicants	17,263	17,699	15,229	14,002	15,305	17,231	15,716	16,210
Admits	14,430	13,781	12,461	10,547	9,603	11,794	11,495	11,533
Admit rate	83	77	82	75	62.7	68.4	73.1	71.1
Enrolled	3,071	3,085	2,988	2,459	2,732	3,120	2,968	3,038
Yield rate	21	22	24	23	28.4	26.5	25.8	26.3
ACT composite* (out of 36)	23-28 (2%^{†})	23-29 (2%^{†})	18-29 (4%^{†})	18-29 (6%^{†})	21-28 (8%^{†})	20-27 (19%^{†})	21-27 (21%^{†})	21-27 (24%^{†})
SAT composite* (out of 1600)	1060-1290 (40%^{†})	1060-1260 (40%^{†})	1000-1199 (44%^{†})	1000-1199 (67%^{†})	1010-1220 (60%^{†})	1000-1200 (91%^{†})	1020-1230 (88%^{†})	1010-1210 (89%^{†})
* middle 50% range^{†} percentage of first-time freshmen who chose to submit

==== Graduate ====
For fall 2024, Wayne State University Law School received 1,179 applications and accepted 344 (29.1%). Of those accepted, 125 enrolled, a yield rate of 36.33%. The Law School had a middle-50% LSAT range of 157-164 for the 2024 first year class.

=== Rankings ===
Academic rankings

National
- Forbes: 267
- U.S. News & World Report: 179
- Washington Monthly: 227
- WSJ/College Pulse: 289

Global
- ARWU: 601–700
- QS: 781-790
- THE: 501–600

In its 2025 rankings, U.S. News & World Report ranked the university's undergraduate program 179th (tied) among 436 national universities, and 97th among public national universities.

=== Libraries ===
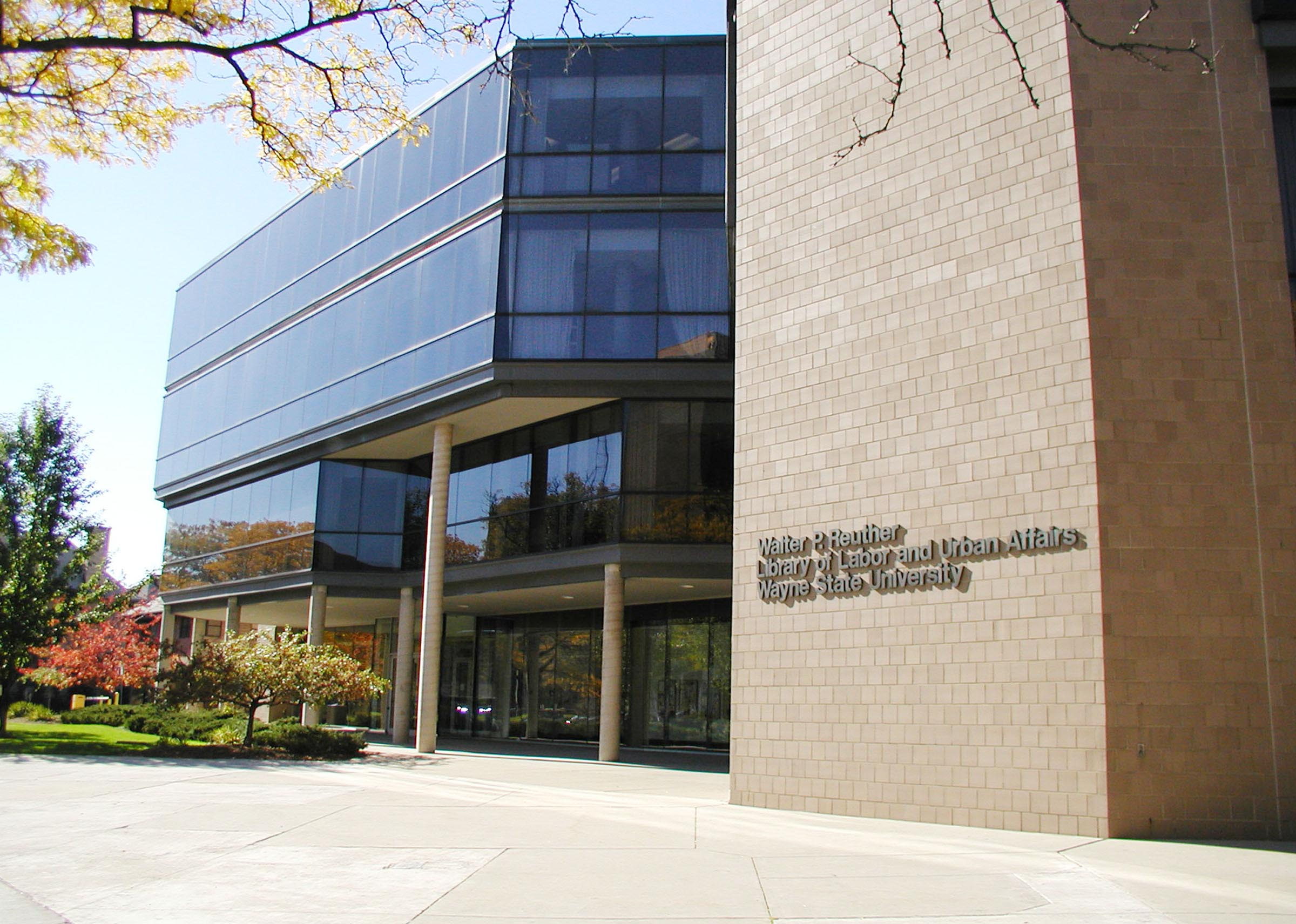
Walter P. Reuther Library, Archives of Labor and Urban Affairs

With nearly four million volumes, the Wayne State University Library System houses the 75th largest collection in the United States, according to the American Library Association.

- The Vera P. Shiffman Medical Library, located at Wayne State's medical campus, houses the university's medical and health collections and is the primary library for the School of Medicine and the Eugene Applebaum College of Pharmacy and Health Sciences.
- The Arthur Neef Law Library, located on the north section of the main campus adjacent to the Wayne State University Law School, houses the university's law collections and is the Law School's primary library. Its collection of over 620,000 volumes makes it the second largest law library in Michigan. The library subscribes to over 1,500 journals and 1,000 loose-leaf services.
- The Purdy/Kresge Library, located near the center of main campus, serves as the primary research library for the School of Information Sciences. It contains print and electronic resources to meet the research and instructional needs of faculty, graduate students, and upper-level undergraduates. It also houses the university's main government documents collection and the offices of the university's Media Services Department.
- The David Adamany Undergraduate Library (UGL), located at the center of Gullen Mall, has numerous computer workstations providing students with access to electronic resources. Its book and magazine collection is intended to support the learning needs of 1000 and 2000-level undergraduate courses. The UGL houses the university libraries' collection of approximately videos, DVDs, and laser discs and audiotapes. The UGL provides students with information on careers, computers and study skills. The UGL is open 24 hours for both students and faculty.
- The Walter P. Reuther Library, Archives of Labor and Urban Affairs, located on the easternmost portion of main campus at 5401 Cass Avenue, is the largest labor archives in North America and serves as the official archival repository for twelve major unions. It was established as the Labor History Archives for Wayne States University in 1960. In addition to labor records, the archives contain primary source material related to civil and political rights, especially those related to Detroit. The Reuther also houses the Wayne State University Archives dating from the institution's founding as the Detroit Medical College in 1868.

=== Research ===
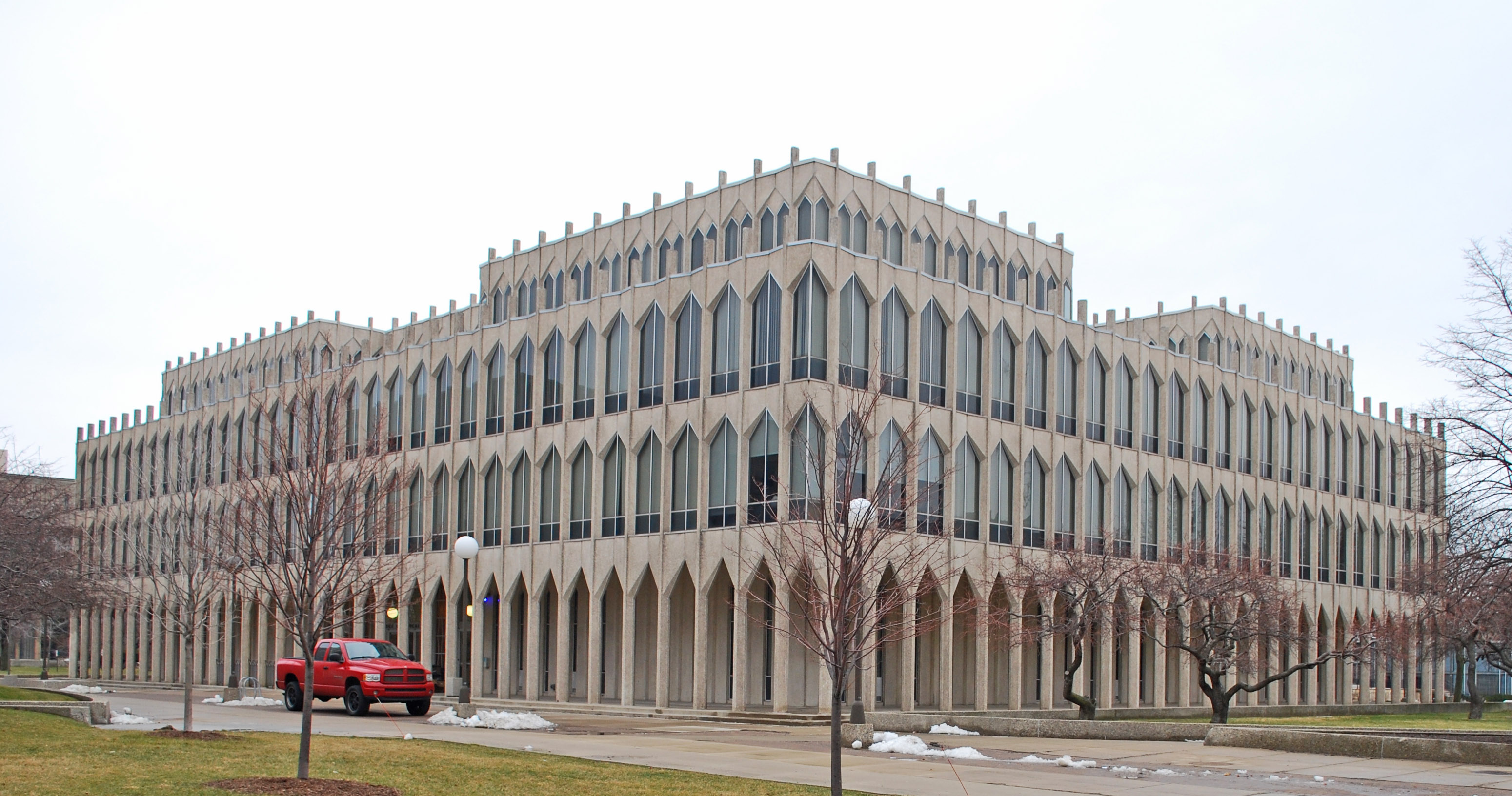
Education Building

Wayne State received $352.6 million in research awards in 2023. Wayne State University, Michigan State University and the University of Michigan are the three institutional members of the State of Michigan's University Research Corridor. The university's Division of Research & Innovation includes several centers, institutes and thematic initiatives, including the Center for Molecular Medicine and Genetics, the Merrill Palmer Skillman Institute, the Institute of Gerontology, the Center for Urban Responses to Environmental Stressors, Healthy Urban Waters, the Translational Neurosciences Initiative, and an initiative on Translational Sciences and Clinical Research Innovation.

== Student life ==
In fall 2024, Wayne State had 23,964 students.

Student body composition as of August 17, 2022
Race and ethnicity	Total
White	55%
Black	16%
Asian	12%
Other (Note: Other consists of Multiracial Americans & those who prefer to not say.)	10%
Hispanic	6%
Foreign national	2%
Economic diversity
Low-income (Note: The percentage of students who received an income-based federal Pell grant intended for low-income students.)	48%
Affluent (Note: The percentage of students who are a part of the American middle class at the bare minimum.)	52%

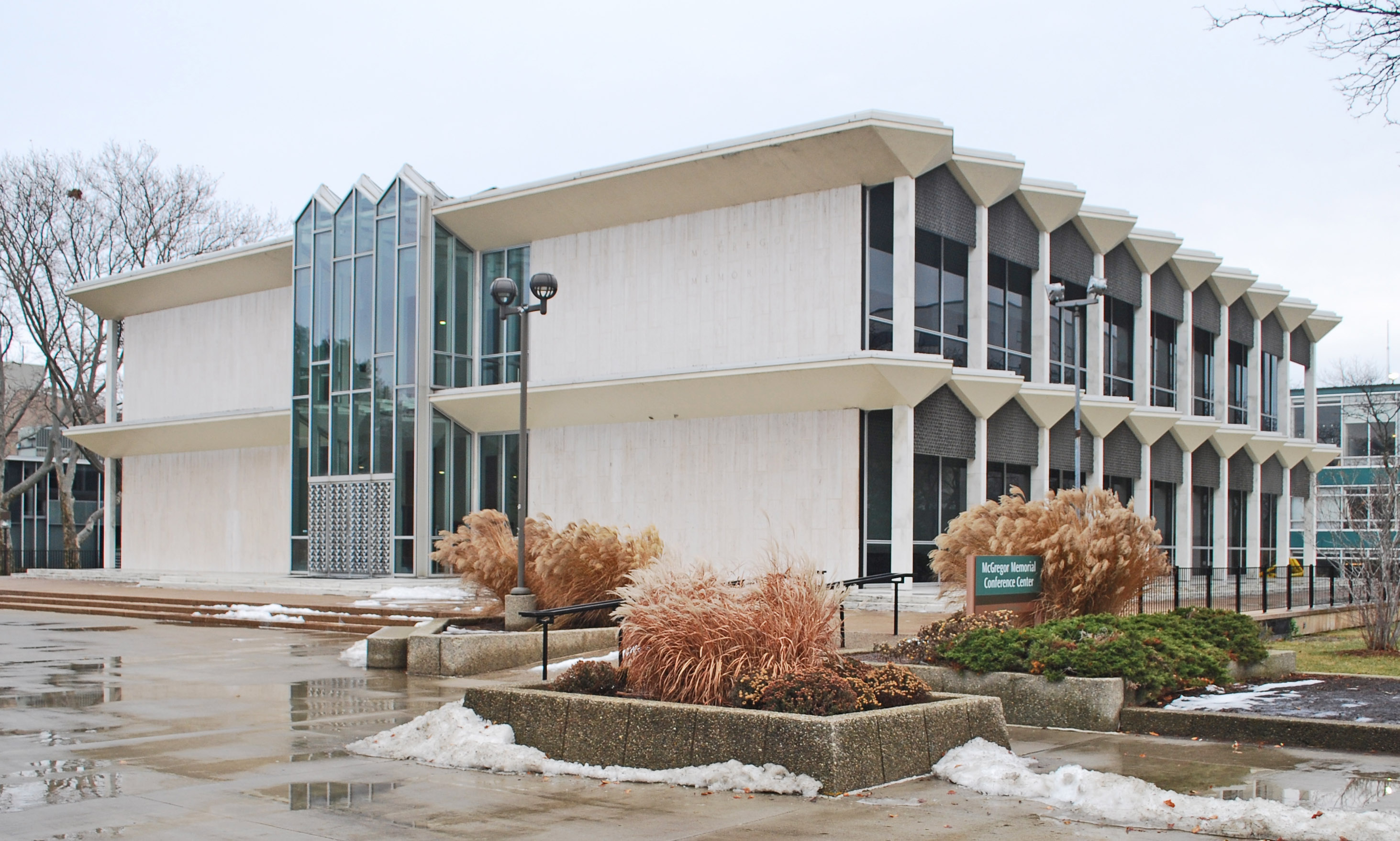
McGregor Memorial Conference Center

=== Housing ===
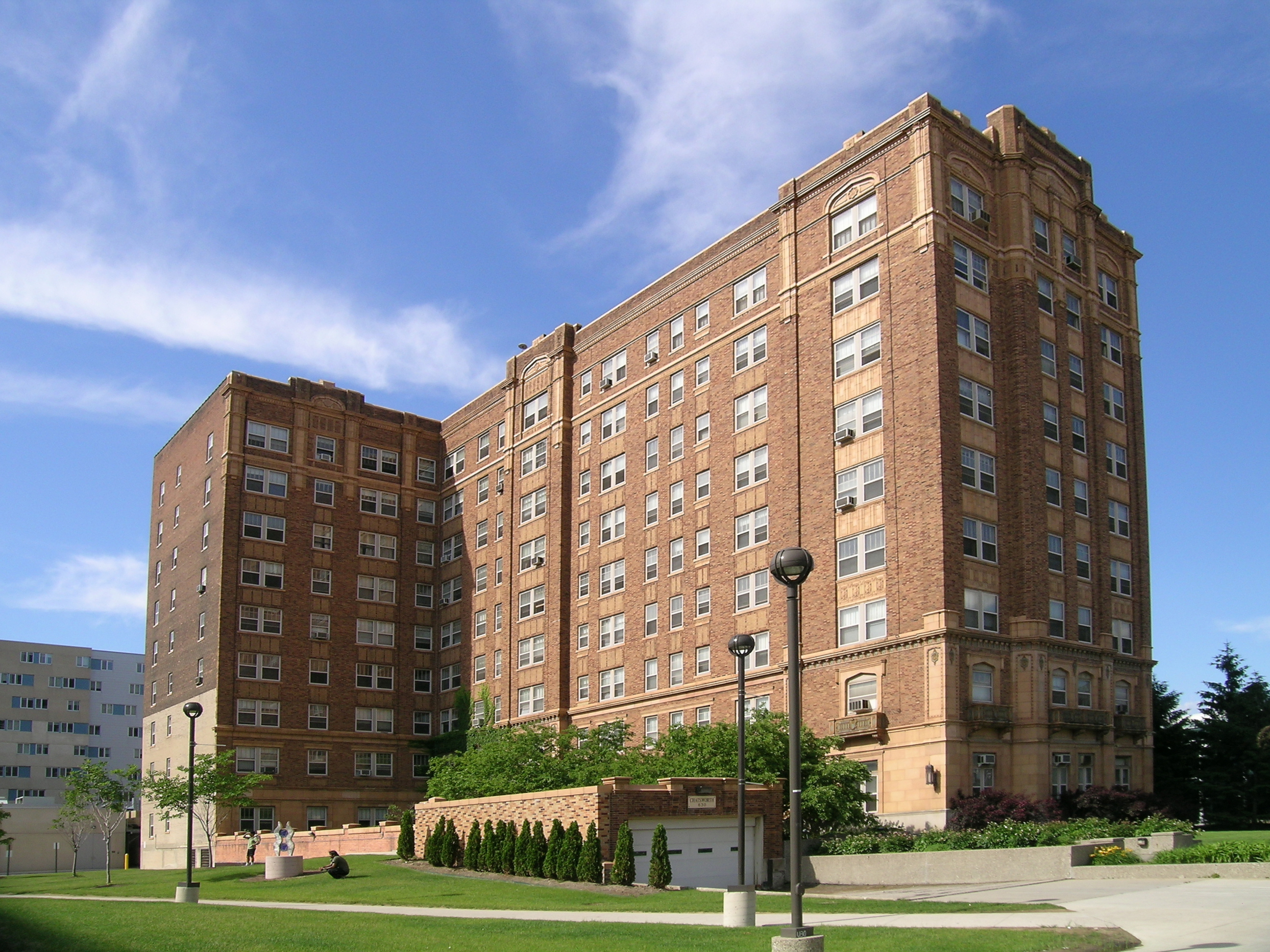
Chatsworth Tower

The university provides optional housing for all students in the form of apartments and residence halls. All buildings are equipped with connection to the university computer system, wireless internet, laundry rooms, activity rooms and a 24-hour help desk. There are many housing options within walking distance of the campus that are not affiliated with the university.

Current university-owned apartment buildings consist of University Towers and Anthony Wayne Drive Apartments. In the hopes of bringing more residents to campus, Wayne State opened two dormitory-style residence halls in 2002: Yousif B. Ghafari Hall (formerly North Hall) and Leon H. Atchison Hall (formerly South Hall). That was the first time since the closing of the Newberry Joy Dorms in 1987 that the university had dorm living available. In 2005, the university opened The Towers Residential Suites, a residence hall open to undergraduate and graduate students. The Towers Café, located in Towers Residential Suites, is the campus' largest dining facility, serving a variety of food. Gold 'n' Greens, located in Ghafari Hall, serves vegan, vegetarian and halal food.

In 2016, the university refurbished the historic Thompson Home and opened The Thompson as a residence hall primarily for students in fine, performing and communication arts. Chatsworth Suites, which debuted in 1928, was renovated as a residence hall in 2020.

=== Fraternity and sorority life ===
Wayne State University hosts chapters of over two dozen fraternities and sororities. There are also professional, honor, service or special interest Greek-letter organizations.

Kappa Alpha Psi fraternity was suspended in 2010 after an incident that seriously injured 22-year-old student Eric Walker. He was repeatedly beaten during hazing rituals.

=== Media ===
The official student newspaper is The South End. The university hosts the public radio station WDET and runs the student online radio station WAYN. The WSU Alumni Association publishes the Wayne State magazine.

== Athletics ==
The school's intercollegiate athletic program was established in 1917 by director of athletics David L. Holmes, who initially coached all sports. His track teams were nationally known into the 1950s; in his first 10 years, he produced two Olympians from the school's Victorian-era gym. Although he had major ambitions for Wayne and scheduled such teams as Notre Dame and Penn State in the 1920s, the lack of facilities and money for athletics kept the program small.

A student poll selected the name of "Tartars" for the school's teams in 1927. In 1999, the university changed the name to the "Warriors." Wayne State competes in men's baseball, basketball, cross country, fencing, football, golf, swimming and diving, and tennis, and women's basketball, cross country, fencing, golf, softball, swimming and diving, tennis, track and field, and volleyball.

WSU participates in NCAA Division II in the Great Lakes Intercollegiate Athletic Conference (GLIAC) for all sports except for fencing, which competes in the single division Midwest Fencing Conference. The school previously competed in men's and women's NCAA Division I ice hockey as a member of College Hockey America (CHA). The university dropped its men's program at the end of the 2007-08 season and the women's hockey program was ended in 2011.

== See also ==
- Architecture of metropolitan Detroit
- Cadillac Place
- Culture of Detroit
- Fisher Building
- Henry Ford Hospital
- The Institute of Gerontology
- New Center
- University–Cultural Center Multiple Resource Area
- Wayne State University Buildings
