= List of Wayne State University people =

Notable people associated with Wayne State University

The following is a list of notable people related to Wayne State University.

== Alumni ==
=== Academia ===
- Sandra Arlinghaus, professor at University of Michigan Ann Arbor
- Rudine Sims Bishop, educator and "mother of" multicultural children's literature
- Claire-Marie Brisson, preceptor in French at Harvard University
- Arthur Danto, Emeritus Johnsonian Professor of Philosophy at Columbia University
- Wayne Dyer, self-help author and motivational speaker
- Paul M. Fleiss, pediatrician, father of Heidi Fleiss
- Joseph Francisco, professor of Chemistry, former president of the American Chemical Society
- David J. Jackson, political science professor at Bowling Green State University
- William J. Kaiser, professor and former department chair of Electrical Engineering at UCLA
- Abdi Kusow, professor of sociology and anthropology at Oakland University
- Emmett Leith, Schlumberger Professor of Engineering at the University of Michigan and recipient of the National Medal of Science
- Douglas McGregor, management professor at the MIT Sloan School of Management and president of Antioch College (1948–1954)
- Nancy Milio, originated the notion of healthy public policy, Professor Emeritus of Nursing and Professor Emeritus of Health Policy and Administration, School of Public Health, University of North Carolina at Chapel Hill
- Godfrey Mwakikagile, Tanzanian scholar, author, Africanist, academic and political theorist
- Saul K. Padover, historian and political scientist at The New School of Social Research in New York City
- Sidney Ribeau, former president of Bowling Green State University, President of Howard University
- Rita Richey, first woman to earn a Ph.D. in instructional technology
- Michael Schwartz (attended), president of Cleveland State University, former president emeritus of Kent State University
- Jacquelyn Taylor, Helen F. Pettit Professor of Nursing; founder and executive director, Center for Research on People of Color at Columbia University
- Dennis Chima Ugwuegbu, Nigeria's first professor of psychology
- Stanley E. Zin, Richard M. Cyert and Morris H. DeGroot Professor of Economics and Statistics, Carnegie Mellon University; Frisch Medal winner

=== Broadcasting and journalism ===
- Tony Brown, journalist, comedian, and businessman
- Rachelle Consiglio, executive producer, The Jerry Springer Show and The Steve Wilkos Show; wife of Steve Wilkos
- Hugh Downs, news anchor for ABC's 20/20
- Wayne Dyer, author, self-help advocate
- Sonny Eliot, weatherman, actor, and comedian
- Mark Fritz, Pulitzer Prize-winning reporter
- Bob Giles, retired 40-year Detroit broadcast news manager for WWJ-TV News, WDIV-TV News, and WXYZ-TV Action News; inducted into Michigan Journalism Hall of Fame in 2012
- Darren M. Haynes, SportsCenter anchor at ESPN in Bristol, Connecticut
- Jerry Hodak, former chief meteorologist for WXYZ-TV Detroit
- Casey Kasem, radio host
- Carol Martin, news anchor and journalist
- Elvis Mitchell, New York Times film critic (1999–2004), entertainment critic for NPR's Weekend Edition, host of The Treatment on KCRW; programmer of the LACMA Film Screening Program
- Mike O'Hara, sportswriter for The Detroit News 1967–2008; in the Michigan Sports Hall of Fame
- Helen Thomas, former White House correspondent; "First Lady of the Washington press corps"

=== Business ===
- Tom Athans, co-founder and former CEO of the liberal-progressive Democracy Radio
- Mark Bertolini, CEO of Aetna
- Howard Birndorf, biotechnology entrepreneur, founding director of Neurocrine Biosciences
- Larry Brilliant, executive director of Google.org
- Bill Davidson, industrialist, billionaire, majority owner of the Detroit Pistons
- Yousif Ghafari, founder and chairman of Ghafari, Inc., philanthropist, and U.S. ambassador
- Dan Gilbert, president and founder of Rock Financial and Quicken Loans, majority owner of the Cleveland Cavaliers
- Peter Karmanos, Jr., founder and CEO of Compuware Corporation; owner of the Carolina Hurricanes, Plymouth Whalers, and Florida Everblades hockey franchises
- Madhusudhan Rao Lagadapati, chairman and CEO of Lanco Infratech; ranked 29th richest person in India with US$2.3 billion in 2010 by Forbes
- David M. Overton, founder and CEO of The Cheesecake Factory, Inc.
- Dhiraj Rajaram, founder and chairman of Mu Sigma, Inc.
- Stephen M. Ross, law school graduate; real estate developer; provided $100 million naming gift for Ross School of Business; Forbes 400 rank: #68 at $4.5 billion
- David Salzman (1969), television producer and businessman

=== Computers, engineering, and technology ===
- Neal Vernon Loving (aeronautical engineering), turbulence specialist
- Harold Mertz (mechanical engineering), created the standard crash test dummy (Hybrid III)
- Ali Nasle (electrical engineering), founder of EDSA Micro Corporation; wrote the world's first digital short circuit program
- Lawrence Patrick (mechanical and aeronautical engineering), researcher in the area of automotive passenger safety; vice president for research and development of Libbey Owens Ford Company, the original manufacturer of laminated safety glass
- John Sawruk (mechanical engineering), engineer and executive with GM
- Ece Yaprak (computer engineer), computer engineer and engineering educator

=== Art and design ===
- Susan Aaron-Taylor, mixed media sculptor, professor (retired) at Cranbrook Academy of Art
- Edith Altman, artist
- Diane Carr, artist
- Niels Diffrient, industrial designer
- Garth Fagan, dancer and choreographer
- Tyree Guyton, artist, created the Heidelberg Project
- Carole Harris, interior designer, textile artist
- Ian Hornak, founding artist of the hyperrealist and photorealist fine art movements
- Leonard D. Jungwirth, sculptor
- Emeline King, industrial designer
- Stanley Lechtzin, jewelry and metal artist, founding member of the Society of North American Goldsmiths
- Hughie Lee-Smith, painter
- Oxana Narozniak, Ukrainian-Brazilian sculptor
- Arthur Seigel, photojournalist, educator and artist
- Darryl DeAngelo Terrell, photographer, curator
- Timothy Van Laar, artist
- R. John Wright, doll designer and maker

=== Government and politics ===
- John D. Altenburg, Army major general, authority for military commissions covering detainees at Guantanamo
- Christine Beatty, former Detroit chief of staff; involved in the Kilpatrick and Beatty text-messaging scandal
- Scott Boman, Michigan politician
- Louvenia Bright, first African American woman to serve in the Vermont General Assembly
- Cora Brown, first African American woman to be elected to a state senate (D-Michigan)
- Chen Pi-Chao, former vice minister of national defense for Taiwan, 2000–2002
- Ken Cockrel Jr., former mayor of Detroit
- John Conyers, former member of the United States House of Representatives (D-Michigan)
- Keith Ellison, first Muslim elected to the United States Congress, currently the attorney general of Minnesota (D-Minnesota)
- William D. Ford, former member of the U.S. House of Representatives (D-Michigan)
- Yousif Ghafari, former US ambassador to Slovenia
- Amer Ghalib, mayor of Hamtramck
- Mitch Greenlick, former member of the Oregon House of Representatives
- Jenean Hampton, former lieutenant governor of Kentucky
- Lawrence Kestenbaum, creator and webmaster of The Political Graveyard
- Nancy Lenoil, state archivist of California
- Andrew Marshall, founding director of the Office of Net Assessment at the U.S. Defense Department
- Fuat Oktay, first vice president of Turkey
- Bruce Patterson, former member of the Michigan Senate; former Wayne County commissioner
- Gary Peters, member of the United States Senate (D-Michigan)
- Teresa Stanek Rea, former acting under secretary of commerce for intellectual property and former acting director of the United States Patent and Trademark Office
- Lynn N. Rivers, former member of the U.S. House of Representatives (D-Michigan)
- Mary Sheffield, mayor of the city of Detroit
- Alma G. Stallworth, former member of the Michigan House of Representatives
- Ulana Suprun, former acting minister of healthcare of Ukraine
- Rashida Tlaib, one of the first two Muslim women elected to the U.S. Congress (D-Michigan)
- John Townsend, member of the Wisconsin State Assembly

=== Law ===
- Shereef Akeel, lawyer, notable for pursuing human rights and civil liberties cases on the behalf of Arab Americans and Muslim Americans
- Sam Bernstein, attorney, founded high-profile firm The Law Offices of Sam Bernstein
- Patricia Boyle, former U.S. federal judge
- Irma Clark-Coleman, member of the Michigan Senate, former member of the Michigan House of Representatives
- John Conyers, U.S. representative since 1964
- George Cushingberry, Jr., member of the Michigan House of Representatives, youngest ever elected
- Nancy Garlock Edmunds, senior U.S. federal judge
- Tod Ensign, veterans' rights lawyer, founder of the advocacy group Citizen Soldier
- Richard Alan Enslen, United States District Court judge
- Elizabeth L. Gleicher, judge on the Michigan Court of Appeals
- Denise R. Johnson, first woman appointed to the Vermont Supreme Court
- Damon Keith, senior judge for the United States Court of Appeals
- Marilyn Jean Kelly, former chief justice of the Michigan Supreme Court
- Joan Mahoney, law scholar, former professor and dean of the Wayne State University Law School
- Dorothy Comstock Riley, former justice of the Michigan Supreme Court; first woman to serve on the Michigan Court of Appeals
- Henry Saad, jurist, Michigan Court of Appeals
- John Weisenberger, former attorney general of Guam

=== Literature ===
- Charles Baxter, writer and educator
- Albert Cleage, author, founder of the Black Christian National Movement
- Dorothy Marie Donnelly, poet
- Paula Gosling, mystery novelist
- Mariela Griffor, poet and novelist, journalist
- Robert Hayden, poet, Consultant in Poetry to the Library of Congress
- Philip Levine, United States Poet Laureate and Pulitzer Prize winner
- Thomas Ligotti, horror story writer
- Raynetta Mañees, romance novelist
- Jonell Nash, cookbook writer and magazine editor
- Dudley Randall, poet and publisher
- Warren Rovetch, travel writer
- Ebony Elizabeth Thomas, writer and educator

=== Magic ===
- Al Schneider, author and magician known for developing the Matrix magic trick

=== Military ===
- Christopher W. Lentz, United States Air Force brigadier general
- Adolph McQueen, United States Army major general; first commander of the Joint Detention Group at Joint Task Force Guantanamo; deputy commander of United States Army North

=== Motion pictures ===
- Deva Katta, director, screenwriter

=== Performing arts ===
- Al Aarons, jazz trumpeter
- Pepper Adams (attended), jazz baritone saxophonist and composer
- Patricia Alice Albrecht, actress, voice over actress, and writer, voice of Pizzazz in Jem
- Dorothy Ashby, jazz harpist and composer
- Madelon Baker (attended), actress, singer, record producer, music publisher
- Anita Barone, actress, The War at Home
- Cherie Bennett, novelist, actress, director, playwright, newspaper columnist, singer, and television writer for The Young and the Restless
- Bob Birch, bassist for the Elton John Band
- Ben Blackwell (attended), musician
- Kenny Burrell, jazz guitarist
- Donald Byrd, trumpeter
- Larry Joe Campbell, actor and comedian, cast member of According to Jim
- Council Cargle, theater and film actor
- Toi Derricotte, poet
- Chad Everett, actor, star of Medical Center and Mulholland Drive
- Garth Fagan choreographer, won Tony Award for The Lion King
- Chris Fehn, custom percussionist for the metal band Slipknot
- Artie Fields (attended), bandleader, songwriter, record producer and jazz trumpeter
- Jeff Frankenstein (attended), keyboardist for Christian pop/rock band Newsboys, dropped out in 1994 to pursue his career with the band
- Curtis Fuller, trombonist
- Frank Gillis, jazz pianist, ethnomusicologist
- Joe Henderson (attended), jazz musician
- Sean Hickey, composer
- Ernie Hudson, actor, Oz, Ghostbusters
- Art James, TV game-show host
- Thorsten Kaye, actor, All My Children, One Life to Live, Port Charles
- Yusef Lateef (attended), jazz musician
- Lazarus, physician, rapper and songwriter from Detroit
- James Lentini, composer and guitarist
- Philip Levine, Pulitzer Prize-winning poet; Distinguished Poet in Residence for the Creative Writing Program at New York University
- Joseph LoDuca, Emmy Award-winning composer
- Dave Marsh (attended), music writer, co-founder of Creem magazine
- Tim Meadows, actor, Saturday Night Live, Mean Girls
- Barbara Meek, actress, Archie Bunker's Place
- S. Epatha Merkerson, actress, Law & Order, Lackawanna Blues
- Kenya Moore, Miss USA 1993 and Miss Michigan USA 1993
- Martin Pakledinaz, costume designer, won Tony Awards for Thoroughly Modern Millie and the 2000 revival of Kiss Me, Kate
- Bobby Pearce, Broadway costume designer
- Bill Prady (attended), television writer and producer
- David Ramsey, actor, Dexter, Blue Bloods, Mother and Child, and Arrow
- Crystal Reed, actress, Teen Wolf
- Della Reese, actress, singer, minister
- Lloyd Richards, stage director, Tony Award for Seven Guitars, Joe Turner's Come and Gone, and A Raisin in the Sun
- Sixto Rodriguez (BA Philosophy, 1981), folk musician, subject of documentary Searching for Sugar Man
- Ruben Santiago-Hudson, Michael Hayes; Tony Award for Seven Guitars
- Kierra Sheard, contemporary gospel singer
- George Shirley, opera singer, 2015 recipient National Medal of Arts
- Darryl Sivad, actor and comedian
- Tom Sizemore, actor, Saving Private Ryan, Black Hawk Down
- Tom Skerritt, Emmy Award-winning actor; has appeared in more than 40 films and 200 television episodes
- Avo Sõmer, musicologist, music theorist, and composer
- Jeffrey Tambor, actor, The Larry Sanders Show, Arrested Development
- Barbara Tarbuck, actress, General Hospital; Fulbright Scholar
- Sonya Tayeh, choreographer on So You Think You Can Dance
- Ron Teachworth, educator, artist, writer, filmmaker (Going Back)
- Lily Tomlin (attended), actress, Nashville, The West Wing, Murphy Brown, Flirting with Disaster, I Heart Huckabees

=== Medicine ===
- Scott Dulchavsky, trauma surgeon and NASA researcher
- Flora Hommel (1928–2015), childbirth educator
- Gerald May, psychiatrist
- Robert Provenzano, nephrologist
- Wolfram Samlowski, medical oncologist
- Robert L. Williams, psychologist

=== Religion ===
- Charles H. Ellis III, former presiding bishop of the Pentecostal Assemblies of the World Inc.
- Dario Hunter, first Muslim-born person to be ordained a rabbi
- John Drew Sheard, Sr., presiding bishop of the Church of God in Christ

=== Science ===
- Matthew John Allen, chemist; development of a molecular cage intended to protect an oxygen-sensitive europium(II) probe while it circulated in blood
- Werner Emmanuel Bachmann, chemist; pioneer in steroid synthesis: carried out the first total synthesis of a steroidal hormone, equilenin; his name is associated with the Gomberg-Bachmann reaction
- Mary Kim Joh, author of a Korean anthem
- Emmett Leith, co-inventor of three-dimensional holography; awarded the National Medal of Science in 1979 by President Jimmy Carter
- Jerry Linenger, astronaut; spent five months living on the Russian space station Mir
- Sultana N. Nahar, physicist, astronomer
- Shirley E. Schwartz (M.S. 1962, Ph.D. 1970), chemist and research scientist at General Motors

=== Sports ===
- Anthony Bass, starting pitcher for the San Diego Padres; Major League Baseball draft (MLB) draft selection in 2008 (5th round)
- Tom E. Beer, former linebacker for the Detroit Lions
- Joique Bell, Wayne State all-time leading rusher; former running back for the Detroit Lions
- Gregory Benko (born 1952), Olympic foil fencer
- Ron Berger, former football player for the New England Patriots
- Hunter Brown, 2019 MLB draft selection (5th round) who plays for the Houston Astros
- Rick Byas, cornerback for the Atlanta Falcons
- Ken Doherty, Olympic bronze medalist, decathlon (1928)
- Phil Emery, former general manager for the Chicago Bears
- Ben Finegold, chess grandmaster
- Kiefer Haffey, college basketball coach
- Byron Krieger (1920–2015), foil, sabre, and épée fencer; NCAA champion; two-time Pan Am gold medalist; two-time Olympian; two-time Maccabiah Games gold medalist
- Allan Kwartler (attended; 1917–1998), sabre and foil fencer; Pan-American sabre champion and three-time gold medal winner; three-time Olympian, and two-time gold medal winner at the Maccabiah Games
- Dan Larson, Major League Baseball pitcher (1976–1982)
- Danny Lewis (born 1970), American-English basketball player
- Stavros Paskaris, former professional ice hockey player
- Fred Snowden, former assistant coach at the University of Michigan; former head coach of the University of Arizona men's basketball teams; first black head coach of a major university's basketball program in America's history
- Otmar Szafnauer, team principal of Alpine F1 Team and former racing driver
- Allen Tolmich, track and field athlete; established or tied 11 U.S. track and field records in 1938, set world hurdling records
- Lorenzo Wright, track and field athlete; gold medal winner in the 1948 Olympics (400-meter relay)

== Honorary graduates ==
- Ernie Harwell, sportscaster
- Carl Levin, U.S. senator
- James Lipton, actor, television host
- Jessye Norman, soprano
- Jack White, musician
- Stephen Yokich, former UAW president

== Faculty and staff ==
=== University presidents ===
1. 1933 - 1942: Frank Cody
2. 1942 - 1945: Warren E. Bow
3. 1945 - 1952: David D. Henry
4. 1952 - 1965: Clarence B. Hilberry
5. 1965 - 1971: William R. Keast
6. 1971 - 1978: George E. Gullen, Jr.
7. 1978 - 1982: Thomas Bonner
8. 1982 - 1997: David Adamany
9. 1997 - 2009: Irvin Reid
10. 2009 - 2010: Jay Noren
11. 2011 - 2013: Allan Gilmour
12. 2013 - 2023: M. Roy Wilson
13. 2023–present: Kimberly Andrews Espy

=== Professors ===
- Norman Allinger, computational chemist, winner of the Benjamin Franklin Medal in Chemistry
- Dora Apel, professor emerita of Modern and Contemporary Art
- Jerry Bails, popular culturist; "father of comic book fandom;" former assistant professor of Natural Science
- Albert T. Bharucha-Reid, dean of the School of Arts and Sciences; Markov chain theorist and statistician
- Susan Bies, member of the Board of Governors of the Federal Reserve System; assistant professor of Economics
- Cynthia Bir, professor of Biomedical Engineering and Orthopaedic Surgery, Emmy Award-winning lead engineer on Sports Science (Fox Sports and ESPN)
- Henry Billings Brown, instructor in Medical Law in the 1860s, later US Supreme Court justice
- Winifred B. Chase, botanist; professor of Botany and dean of women
- John Corvino, philosopher and author; professor of Philosophy
- Oliver Cox, sociologist; member of the Chicago School
- Joanne V. Creighton, expert on women's education; president of Mount Holyoke College
- Carl Djerassi, professor of Chemistry, synthesized the first highly active ingredient for the pill (birth control)
- Forest Dodrill, inventor of the Dodrill-GMR; first person to perform a successful open heart surgery
- Julia Donovan Darlow, attorney; first female president of the State Bar of Michigan; adjunct professor of Law
- John M. Dorsey, chairman of Psychiatry; author; first to be awarded title of university professor
- Sorin Draghici, professor in Computer Science, Robert J. Sokol, MD Endowed Chair in Systems Biology in Reproduction, director of the James and Patricia Anderson Engineering Ventures Institute, associate dean of College of Engineering
- Scott Dulchavsky, trauma surgeon; chief of Surgery at HFHS; NASA principal investigator
- Joseph W. Eaton, sociologist; anthropologist; listed in Who is Who in the World for his published research and academic career in public and international affairs, social work and public health
- Muneer Fareed, Islamic scholar, secretary general of the Islamic Society of North America
- David Fasenfest, associate professor of Sociology
- Farshad Fotouhi, professor of Computer Science; dean of College of Engineering
- Douglas Fraser, adjunct professor of Labor Relations; former president of the United Auto Workers
- Edmund Gettier, philosopher; published Is Justified True Belief Knowledge?
- Wallace Givens, mathematician; pioneer in computer science; namesake of the Givens rotation
- Martin Glaberman, influential Marxist, professor emeritus
- Morris Goodman, scientist, editor-in-chief of Molecular Phylogenetics and Evolution journal, Distinguished Professor at the Center for Molecular Medicine and Genetics at Wayne State University School of Medicine
- Neil Gordon, professor and chair of the Department of Chemistry, founded the Journal of Chemical Education and established the world-renowned Gordon Research Conferences
- David Gorski, associate professor of surgery and oncology; known for his blogs critical of alternative medicine
- Margaret Hayes Grazier, librarian, author, associate professor since 1965, professor 1972–1983
- Suraj N. Gupta, professor emeritus, notable for his contributions to quantum field theory; known for developing the Gupta–Bleuler formalism of field quantization
- Kermit L. Hall; legal historian
- Carla Harryman, poet; essayist; playwright; professor of Women's Studies and Creative Writing
- Matthew Holden, political scientist
- Ian Hornak, founding artist of the hyperrealist and photorealist fine art movements
- Jerome Horwitz, Wayne State University School of Medicine Professor of Internal Medicine and Karmanos Cancer Institute researcher; synthesized the first drug approved for the treatment of AIDS and HIV infection, Zidovudine; synthesized Zalcitabine (ddC) and Stavudine (d4T), the third and fourth drugs approved to treat AIDS
- Adrian Kantrowitz, MD, performed the world's first pediatric heart transplant, and the first heart transplant in the United States; chairman of the Department of Surgery
- Ernest Kirkendall, chemist and metallurgist; discovered the Kirkendall effect
- Henry E. Kyburg, Jr., expert in probability and logic; known for the Lottery Paradox and for the Kyburgian or epistemological interpretation of probability
- Keith Lehrer, philosopher; former professor of Philosophy
- Peter LeWitt, neurologist
- M.L. Liebler, taught English, creative writing, world literature, American studies, and labor studies; authored several books of poetry
- Jessica Litman, expert on copyright law, professor of Law
- David L. Mackenzie, educator and founding dean
- Maryann Mahaffey, former member of the Detroit City Council, professor emerita at the School of Social Work
- William V. Mayer, professor of Zoology; known for his work in promoting biology education
- Forrest McDonald, historian, leading conservative scholar
- Ron Milner, author of a Broadway play, professor of creative writing
- Horace Miner, anthropologist
- Boris Mordukhovich, mathematician in the areas of nonlinear analysis, optimization, and control theory; founder of modern variational analysis and generalized differentiation; Distinguished University Professor and Lifetime Scholar of the Academy of Scholars at Wayne State
- Jennifer Sheridan Moss, professor of Latin and Classics; papyrologist
- Hidegorō Nakano, mathematician, after whom Nakano Spaces are named
- Frederick Newmeyer, linguist; known for his work on the history of generative syntax and the evolutionary origin of language
- Robert Peters, poet, critic, scholar, playwright, editor, and actor; received Guggenheim and National Endowment for the Arts fellowships; won the Alice Fay di Castagnola Award of the Poetry Society of America
- Alexey A Petrov, physicist in the area of theoretical particle physics; known for his work in heavy quark phenomenology; received National Science Foundation CAREER Award
- Alvin Plantinga, contemporary philosopher; known for his work in epistemology, metaphysics, and the philosophy of religion
- Ananda Prasad, biochemist, Distinguished Professor of Medicine
- Earl H. Pritchard, Rhodes Scholar; scholar of China; founder and president of the Association for Asian Studies; first recipient of the Distinguished Civilian Service Medal
- Robert Provenzano, MD, associate clinical professor of Medicine at the School of Medicine; expert on chronic kidney disease and kidney transplantation; former president of the Renal Physicians Association
- Claude Pruneau, physicist in the area of heavy ion research; known for his work on particle correlation measurements in heavy ion collisions
- John R. Reed, distinguished professor emeritus of English
- Rita Richey, professor emeritus of Instructional Technology
- Shlomo Sawilowsky, professor of Educational Statistics and Distinguished Faculty Fellow; founder and editor of the Journal of Modern Applied Statistical Methods
- Matthew Seeger, professor of Communication; dean of the College of Fine, Performing and Communication Arts
- Marvin Schindler, professor emeritus of German and Slavic Studies
- Steven Shaviro, prominent cultural critic
- Melvin Small, historian of US Diplomacy; former president of the Peace History Society; author of several award-winning books
- Renate Soulen, professor of radiology, 1989–2005; co-founder of Society of Interventional Radiology
- Calvin L. Stevens, chemist, professor of Organic Chemistry; known for being the first to synthesize the drug ketamine
- Mary Chase Perry Stratton, ceramic artist; founder of Pewabic Pottery
- Emanuel Tanay, forensic psychiatrist
- Athan Theoharis, expert on U.S. intelligence agencies, primarily the FBI
- William Lay Thompson, professor emeritus of Biological Sciences, expert on bird vocalizations, past president of the Michigan Audubon Society and past editor of the Jack Pine Warbler
- Brian VanGorder, defensive coordinator for the Atlanta Falcons; former football head coach
- Sergei Voloshin, physicist in the area of heavy ion research; known for his work on event-by-event physics in heavy ion collisions
- Barrett Watten, poet; educator; professor of modernism and cultural studies
- Joseph Weizenbaum, professor emeritus of computer science at MIT; created early computer in 1952 at Wayne State University
- Frank H. Wu, lawyer and author; former dean of the law school
- Robert Zieger, labor historian; recipient of the Taft Labor History Award; professor of history
- Wolf W. Zuelzer, professor of Pediatric Research
