= Ethel Finck =

American interventional radiologist

Ethel Jean Finck
- Born: Ethel Jean Eng; October 8, 1932; Los Angeles, California, US
- Died: August 23, 2003 (aged 70)
- Occupations: Inventor; Interventional radiologist
- Known for: Development of the Finck cardiac catheter

Ethel Jean Finck, M.D. (October 8, 1932– August 23, 2003), was an American interventional radiologist, credited as one of three women founders of the Society of Interventional Radiology in 1973. She was also the inventor of the Finck cardiac catheter.

== Early life ==
Born in Los Angeles, Ethel Jean Eng had congenital heart disease and underwent surgical repair as a teenager by Dr. John Kirklin at the Mayo Clinic. Her experience launched her interest in cardiovascular disease and medicine from an early age.

== Career ==
Finck spent her entire career, from internship through professorship, at the University of Southern California (USC) Medical Center, and eventually spent four decades (1962-1996) on the USC faculty.

In 1973, she joined 56 other founding members to establish the Society of Interventional Radiology (then the Society of Cardiovascular Radiology). She was one of three women among the founding members, along with Helen Redman and Renate Soulen.

== Selected publications ==
- Ethel J. Finck and Mordecai Halpern, (1971) The Nutrient Supplement-Enhanced Celiac Angiogram. Radiology 1971 101:1, 79-83.
- Layne, T. A., Finck, E. J., & Boswell, W. D. (1978). Transcatheter occlusion of the arterial supply to arteriovenous fistulas with Gianturco coils. American Journal of Roentgenology, 131(6), 1027-1030.
- McNeese, S., Finck, E., & Yellin, A. (1980). Definitive treatment of selected vascular injuries and post-traumatic arteriovenous fistulas by arteriographic embolization. American journal of surgery, 140 2, 252-9.
- Yellin, A., Lundell, C., & Finck, E. (1983). Diagnosis and control of posttraumatic pelvic hemorrhage. Transcatheter angiographic embolization techniques. Archives of surgery, 118 12, 1378-83.
- Quinn, M. F., Lundell, C. J., Klotz, T. A., Finck, E. J., Pentecost, M., McGehee, W. G., & Garnic, J. D. (1987). Reliability of selective pulmonary arteriography in the diagnosis of pulmonary embolism. American Journal of Roentgenology, 149 (3), 469-471.
- Blickenstaff, K.L., Weaver, F., Yellin, A., Stain, S., & Finck, E. (1989). Trends in the management of traumatic vertebral artery injuries. American journal of surgery, 158 2, 101-5; discussion 105-6.
- Robinson, David & Teitelbaum, George & Pentecost, Michael & Weaver, Fred & Finck, Ethel. (1993). Transcatheter embolization of an aortocaval fistula caused by residual renal artery stump from previous nephrectomy: A case report. Journal of vascular surgery : official publication, the Society for Vascular Surgery [and] International Society for Cardiovascular Surgery, North American Chapter. 17. 794-7. 10.1016/0741-5214(93)90130-E.
