= Farshad Fotouhi =

American computer scientist

- Persian: فرشاد فتوحی
- Farshad Fotouhi in 2011
- Born: 1957 (age 68–69)
- Citizenship: United States
- Education: Michigan State University
- Scientific career
- Fields: Computer Science, Databases, Data Mining, Semantic Web, Multimedia Systems, and Biomedical Informatics
- Workplaces: Wayne State University
- Doctoral advisor: Sakti Pramanik

Farshad Fotouhi (born 1957) is the dean of Wayne State University's college of engineering. Farshad Fotouhi joined Wayne State University in 1988 as faculty in the Department of Computer Science. From 2000 to 2004, he was associate chair of the department, and from 2004 to 2010 he was chair.

== Life and career ==
=== Schooling and research ===
He holds a bachelor's in Computer Science from Western Michigan University and a Ph.D. in computer science from the College of Engineering at Michigan State University.

Fotouhi's research includes biomedical informatics, multimedia systems and the Semantic Web. He has published more than 190 papers in academic journals and conference proceedings. His research has been supported by the National Science Foundation, the National Institutes of Health, the National Institute of Drug Abuse, Michigan Life Sciences Corridor, as well as Ford Motor Company and other companies.

He has been a program committee member for various conferences related to his research interests and is a member of the editorial board of IEEE Multimedia Magazine, chair of the Steering Committee of IEEE Transactions on Multimedia, and a member of the editorial board of the International Journal of Semantic Web and Information Systems. In recent years, Dr. Fotouhi has organized several workshops including the Workshop on Privacy in Information Society, the IEEE Workshop on Scientific Workflow, and the ACM workshop on the Many Faces of Multimedia Semantics.

He was appointed dean of Wayne State University's college of engineering in March 2011.

== See also ==
- Wayne State University
- List of Wayne State University people
