= Fotouhi =

Fotouhi (Persian: فتوحی) is a Persian/Iranian surname. Notable people with the name include:

- David Fotouhi (born 1984/1985), American lawyer and government official
- Farshad Fotouhi (born 1957), American computer scientist
- Mohammad Fotouhi (born 1990), Iranian fencer
