= Drăghici =

Drăghici may refer to:

- Drăghici, a village in Mihăești Commune, Argeș County, Romania
- Drăghici (Râul Târgului), a tributary of the Râul Târgului in Argeș County, Romania
- Drăghici, a tributary of the Slănic in Buzău County, Romania

== People with the surname ==
- Alexandru Drăghici (1913–1993), Romanian communist activist and politician
- Damian Drăghici (born 1970), Romanian musician
- Sorin Draghici (born 1965), Romanian-American scientist

== See also ==
- Dragić
