= Charlotte Nickinson =

Canadian stage actress and theatre director

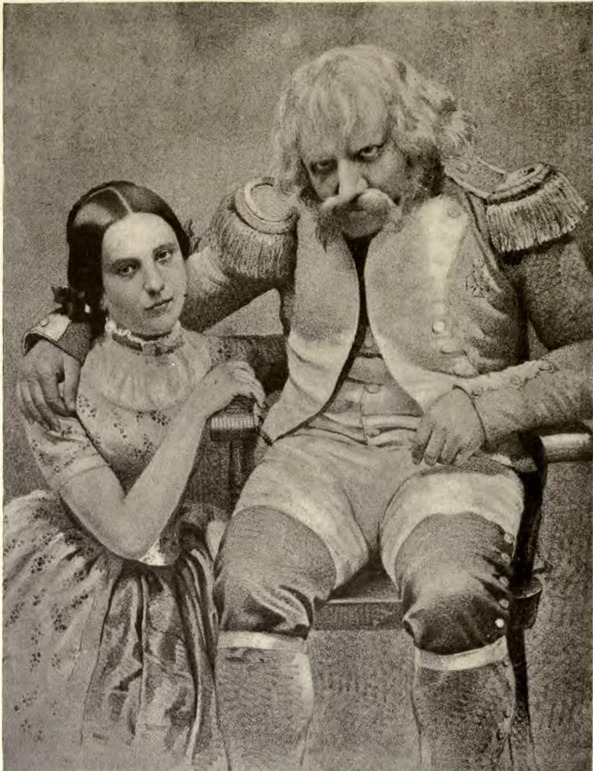
- Charlotte Nickinson and her father John in Napoleon’s Old Guard
- Born: 16 February 1832; Quebec
- Died: 8 August 1910 (aged 78); Toronto
- Occupation: Actor
- Spouse(s): Daniel Morrison
- Parent(s): John Nickinson

Charlotte Nickinson (Quebec, 16 February 1832-8 August 1910, Quebec), was a Canadian stage actress and theatre director. She was a popular actress in her active years from 1846 to 1858, and managed her own touring theatre company from 1871 until 1878.

She was the daughter of John Nickinson and Mary Ann Talbot and married journalist Daniel Morrison in 1858. Her father was from 1836 active as an actor and toured Albany, Utica, Saint John, N.B., and Montreal with a base in New York.

Nickinson made her debut as an actress in New York in June 1846 at the Vauxhall Garden Theatre. Between 1847 and 1851 she performed with her father in the Olympic Theatre company. Her most-known roles were as Melanie to her father’s Havresack in Dion Boucicault’s Napoleon’s Old Guard, and Florence in John Brougham’s adaptation of Charles Dickens’ Dombey and Son.

Between 1851 and 1858 she regularly toured Canada as the leading lady and star member of her father's own theatre company, where her siblings Eliza, Virginia, Isabella, and John also performed. Her roles included Shakespeare’s Ophelia, Lady Teazle in Sheridan’s The School for Scandal and Lady Gay Spanker in Boucicault’s comedy London Assurance, ad she was called “La Jeune Quebecoise”. The company was very popular in Canada, where most theatre productions at that point was performed by travelling theatre companies. From 1853, her father leased Toronto’s Royal Lyceum Theatre. She was described as tall, slim, and striking, with a “beautiful musical voice,” a “delicious” and infectious laugh, and a gift for comedy, and was respected for her warmth, charm, and good taste.

She retired from the stage after her 1858 marriage to newspaper editor Daniel Morrison. In 1870, she was widowed and obliged to return to the stage to support herself and her children. She assembled her own theatre company in 1871, and managed the Royal Lyceum in Toronto with success. In 1874, she opened her own Grand Opera House (known during her tenure as Mrs. Morrison’s Grand Opera House). Many later well-known Canadian performers were engaged in her company, such as Adelaide Neilson, Edwin Thomas Booth, Lawrence Patrick, John Henry Miller and Ida Van Cortland. In 1878, her theatre was no longer lucrative and she retired. After her retirement, she made guest performances, and became a prominent member of the National Council of Women of Canada, the Women’s Canadian Historical Society of Toronto, and president of the Toronto Relief Society.
