= Pruneau =

Pruneau could refer to:

- French for prune, or a dried plum
- Pruneau (surname)
