= The Meaning of Marxism =

2006 nonfiction book

- Author: Paul D'Amato
- Language: English
- Subject: Marxism
- Publisher: Haymarket Books
- Publication date: 2006
- Publication place: The United States of America
- English publication date: June 1, 2006
- Media type: Print
- Pages: 164
- ISBN: 978-1931859295

The Meaning of Marxism is a 2006 nonfiction book written by Columbia University professor and managing editor of The International Socialist Review Paul D'Amato and published by Haymarket Books in 2006.

== Synopsis ==
Dr. D'Amato presents a brief introduction to the philosophy of Karl Marx and Frederich Engels through a Trotskyist perspective.

== Reception ==
The book received reviews from journals including International Socialist Review, Critical Sociology, and Midwest Book Review.
