= Ali Nasle =

Ali Nasle is an expert in electrical engineering, power engineering systems and Power Systems CAD, and the founder of EDSA Micro Corporation.

He wrote an early digital short circuit program in 1965, under a grant from Detroit Edison and IBM, for the then-new IBM 1130; for this effort, he was named Michigan’s Outstanding Young Engineer the following year.

Over subsequent years, he is credited with dozens of inventions and innovations for the design and simulation of electrical power systems, and is regarded as a leading authority on electrical power generation, transmission, and on-premises infrastructure.

For his lifetime achievements, he has earned many accolades throughout his career, including:

- IEEE Outstanding Engineer
- Outstanding Engineer in Industry by the Michigan chapter of the National Society of Professional Engineers
- College of Fellows by The Engineering Society of Detroit
- Wayne State University Hall of Fame

At present, he remains active in the Critical Power Coalition and continues his power systems engineering work, focusing on the emerging new field of power analytics.

== See also ==
- Power analytics
