= Hunter Brown =

American baseball player (born 1998)

Houston Astros – No. 58
- Pitcher
- Born: August 29, 1998 (age 28); Detroit, Michigan, U.S.
- Bats: Right Throws: Right

MLB debut
- September 5, 2022, for the Houston Astros

MLB statistics (through 2026 season)
- Win–loss record: 42–35
- Earned run average: 3.44
- Strikeouts: 709
- Stats at Baseball Reference

Teams
- Houston Astros (2022–present)

Career highlights and awards
- All-Star (2025); World Series champion (2022)

Hunter Noah Brown (born August 29, 1998), nicknamed "Diesel", is an American professional baseball pitcher for the Houston Astros of Major League Baseball (MLB). He played college baseball at Wayne State University. The Astros selected him in the fifth round of the 2019 MLB draft, and he made his MLB debut in 2022. In 2025, Brown was named to his first All-Star game.

== Early life ==
Born in Detroit, Michigan, Hunter Brown grew up in St. Clair Shores, Michigan. He attended St. Isaac Jogues Elementary School, followed by Lakeview High School, where he played catcher and pitcher.

Brown played college baseball at NCAA Division II Wayne State University, located one mile from Comerica Park, and the only school at any level to offer him a scholarship. In 2018, he played in two collegiate summer baseball leagues. He played for the Bethesda Big Train of the Cal Ripken Sr. Collegiate Baseball League, where he appeared in 13 games and pitched to an ERA of 1.26. After his season with the Big Train, Brown played with the Cotuit Kettleers of the Cape Cod Baseball League. As a junior at Wayne State, Brown went 9–0 with a 2.21 earned run average over 14 starts and struck out 114 batters in 85 1/3 innings pitched.

While Justin Verlander was pitching for the Detroit Tigers, Brown grew up idolizing him and frequently attended games at Comerica Park. Late in the 2022 season, Verlander, then pitching for the Houston Astros, landed on the injured list due to a right calf issue, and Astros called Brown up to the major leagues. Hence, the two pitchers became teammates.

== Professional career ==
=== Draft and minor leagues ===
Brown was selected in the 5th round of the 2019 Major League Baseball draft by the Houston Astros at 166th overall. He signed with the team and was assigned to the Tri-City ValleyCats of the Class A Short Season New York–Penn League and went 2–2 with a 4.56 ERA and 33 strikeouts in 23 2/3 innings pitched.

After not playing in 2020 due to the cancellation of the minor league season as a response to the COVID-19 pandemic, Brown began the 2021 season with the Double-A Corpus Christi Hooks. Brown was promoted to the Triple-A Sugar Land Skeeters in August 2021 after posting a 1–4 record with a 4.20 ERA and 76 strikeouts in 49 1/3 innings pitched with the Hooks.

The Astros invited Brown to 2022 spring training camp as a non-roster invitee. He returned to Sugar Land to start the season, and was selected to the All-Star Futures Game. On May 31, he was named Pacific Coast League (PCL) Pitcher of the Week after a scoreless 7-inning outing with 10 strikeouts versus the El Paso Chihuahuas. Brown finished his season in Triple-A as the PCL leader in ERA (2.55, minimum 60 innings pitched), and induced a strikeout rate of 31.5% and groundball rate of 54.2%. Over 23 total appearances, he made 14 starts and hurled 106 innings. In August 2022, Brown ranked as the Astros' top prospect and moved in MLB.com Pipeline's from #80 to #71 overall in baseball. His curveball (65) was graded as the best among all top-100 prospects. Following the regular season, he was named PCL Pitcher of the Year, and the Astros' Minor League Pitcher of the Year.

=== Houston Astros ===
==== 2022 ====
The Astros promoted Brown from Sugar Land to the major league roster for the first time on September 1, 2022. On September 5, he started and won a sensational major league debut, hurling the first six innings of a 1–0 shutout of the Texas Rangers. He allowed three hits, one walk and struck out five to outduel Rangers ace Martín Pérez. Brown retired the first eight batters faced, including striking out the first two of the game, Marcus Semien and Corey Seager, for his first two career strikeouts. The win evened the Astros' all-time franchise win-loss record at 4,812–4,812, for the first time since in May 14, 2006. In his second start of the season, Brown made his road debut as a homecoming in Detroit with friends and family in attendance, leading a 6–3 defeat of the Detroit Tigers. He allowed two runs on five hits over six innings. On September 19, Brown made his relief debut, hurling three innings in a 4–0 shutout of the Tampa Bay Rays to clinch a 5th American League West division title for the Astros over the previous six seasons. On October 4, Brown relieved Verlander in an ongoing no-hitter against the Philadelphia Phillies and delivered 2 1/3 hitless innings that Houston pitching maintained until the 9th inning.

In 2022, Brown was 2–0 with an 0.89 ERA in 20 1/3 innings with 22 strikeouts, in seven games (two starts).

Brown made his postseason debut on October 11, in Game 1 of the American League Division Series. He pitched in relief in the 8th inning, surrendering just one hit in an 8–7 Astros' walk-off win over the Seattle Mariners. Brown also threw two scoreless innings in the 12th and 13th of the Astros' 18-inning victory over the Mariners in Game 3. Brown's last appearance of the postseason came in Game 3 of the American League Championship Series against the New York Yankees, throwing 2/3 of an inning to help close out a 5–0 win. The Astros advanced to the World Series and defeated the Phillies in six games to give him his first career World Series title.

==== 2023 ====
On May 26, 2023, Brown posted a career-high 10 strikeouts versus the Oakland Athletics to lead a 5–2 win. Brown concluded the 2023 season with a 11–13 W–L, 5.09 ERA, 31 games, 29 starts, 155 2/3 IP, 157 hits, 26 home runs allowed, and 178 strikeouts.

==== 2024 ====
Brown started the 2024 season with 9.78 ERA and 0–4 W–L in six April starts. On April 11 versus Kansas City Royals, he became the first pitcher to allow 11 hits in less than one inning, leading to nine runs while tallying 2/3 inning. In June, Brown pitched to a 1.16 ERA, 4–0 W–L, 31 IP, 36 strikeouts, and 8 walks, yielding the lowest ERA in the major leagues for the month. Further, his 2.31 ERA from June 1 through the end of the season ranked third in MLB. Brown concluded the 2024 season with an 11–9 W–L, 3.49 ERA, 31 games, 30 starts, 170 IP, 156 hits, 18 home runs allowed, and 179 strikeouts. He ranked 9th in the American League (AL) in strikeouts per nine innings pitched (K/9, 9.476) and surrendered the 10th-most walks (60).

In Game 2 of the AL Wild Card Series, Brown made his first career postseason start. He surrendered one run versus the Tigers in 5 1/3 innings and struck out nine. Brown received a no-decision as the Tigers rallied for a 5–2 win and swept the series.

==== 2025 ====
From April 3, 2025, until a one-run, six-inning performance against the Kansas City Royals on April 27, Brown authored a scoreless innings streak of 28. The fifth-longest in franchise history, (Note: This innings streak trailed Roy Oswalt (32 1/3), J. R. Richard (31), Don Wilson (29) and Darryl Kile (28 2/3).) he ended that contest with a 1.22 ERA through his first six starts of the season. As result of his month of April 2025, Brown received MLB Central's Pitch Hand Award, to recognize him as the media outlet's nomination as best pitcher in the major leagues. On May 16, Brown tossed his first complete game in professional baseball, at Globe Life Field versus Texas, and surrendered just 1 run on a Jake Burger home run. However, he was outdueled by eight shutout innings from Jacob deGrom as Texas prevailed, 1–0. Brown tossed seven innings on June 14 against the Minnesota Twins with just two runs surrendered, struck out a new career-high 12, and left with the game tied to receive a no decision. In the bottom of the ninth, rookie Cam Smith had a walk-off hit for the 3–2 win. Brown was named the American League Pitcher of the Month in June 2025, after allowing four earned runs in 30 1/3 (1.19 ERA) and striking out 39 batters on the month. It was the first time that Brown earned Pitcher of the Month in his career.

Brown recorded a strikeout of Hunter Goodman of the Colorado Rockies on July 2 for the 500th of his career to join teammate Lance McCullers Jr. as the only Astros pitchers to reach the milestone within their first 86 appearances. On July 6, 2025, Brown was announced as a reserve pitcher for the American League at the MLB All-Star Game, his first career selection. On September 19, Brown strikes out Eugenio Suárez for his 200th strikeout of the season, reaching the milestone for the first time in his career during the top of the 6th inning, despite losing to the Mariners in a 4–0 shutout loss. Brown continued his breakout performance through the entire 2025 season, finishing second in the AL with a career-best 2.43 ERA, 12–9 W–L record, 185 1/3 inning, 206 K, while ranking third in hits per nine innings (6.459 H/9), and fourth in walks plus hits per inning pitched (1.025 WHIP) and fielding independent pitching (3.14 FIP).

==== 2026 ====
On April 5, 2026, Brown was placed on the injured list due to a right shoulder strain. He was transferred to the 60-day injured list on May 9. Brown was activated on June 16. He concluded the season 6–4 and 3,19 ERA over 107 1/3 IP in 20 starts. Brown struck out 124 and yielded a 1.267 WHIP.

== See also ==
- List of Wayne State University people

Awards and achievements
Preceded by Kris Bubic	American League Pitcher of the Month; June 2025	Succeeded by Nathan Eovaldi
