= Journal of Vascular and Interventional Radiology =

- Discipline: Interventional Radiology
- Language: English
- Edited by: Daniel Y. Sze

Publication details
- History: 1990-present
- Publisher: Elsevier (United States)
- Frequency: Monthly
- Impact factor: 3.682 (2021)

Standard abbreviations
- ISO 4: J. Vasc. Interv. Radiol.

Indexing
- CODEN: JVIRE3
- ISSN: 1051-0443 (print); 1535-7732 (web)
- OCLC no.: 21769279

Links
- Journal homepage; Online archive

The Journal of Vascular and Interventional Radiology is a monthly peer-reviewed medical journal covering the field of interventional radiology. It was established in 1990 and is published by Elsevier on behalf of the Society of Interventional Radiology. The editor-in-chief is Daniel Y. Sze. The journal is abstracted and indexed in the Science Citation Index Expanded, Biotechnology Research Abstracts, CINAHL, Embase, MEDLINE, and Scopus. According to the Journal Citation Reports, the journal has a 2021 impact factor of 3.682.
