= Harold Mertz =

American automotive safety pioneer

Harold J. "Bud" Mertz is an American researcher who is helped in the creation of the Hybrid III crash test dummy, the standard dummy used in car safety tests. Working with General Motors in the late 1960s, Mertz designed and built the dummy which is today the only recognized test device in both North America and Europe for restraint devices which protect against frontal collisions.

Mertz earned his bachelor's degree in aeronautical engineering at Wayne State University, and took a course on fluid dynamics under the tutelage of Lawrence Patrick, who was at the time using himself as a guinea pig in investigating the effects of car crashes on humans. Patrick offered Mertz an opportunity to work as his research assistant, and Mertz accepted.

Mertz went on to do his graduate studies at Wayne State, and worked with cadavers in crash testing studies too violent to use live volunteers. He completed his Ph.D. with a dissertation on whiplash-type injuries in 1967, In 1969, he was hired as a senior researcher at GM.

Mertz retired from General Motors in 2005, and lives with his wife in Harper Woods, Michigan.
