= Wolfram Samlowski =

Oncologist

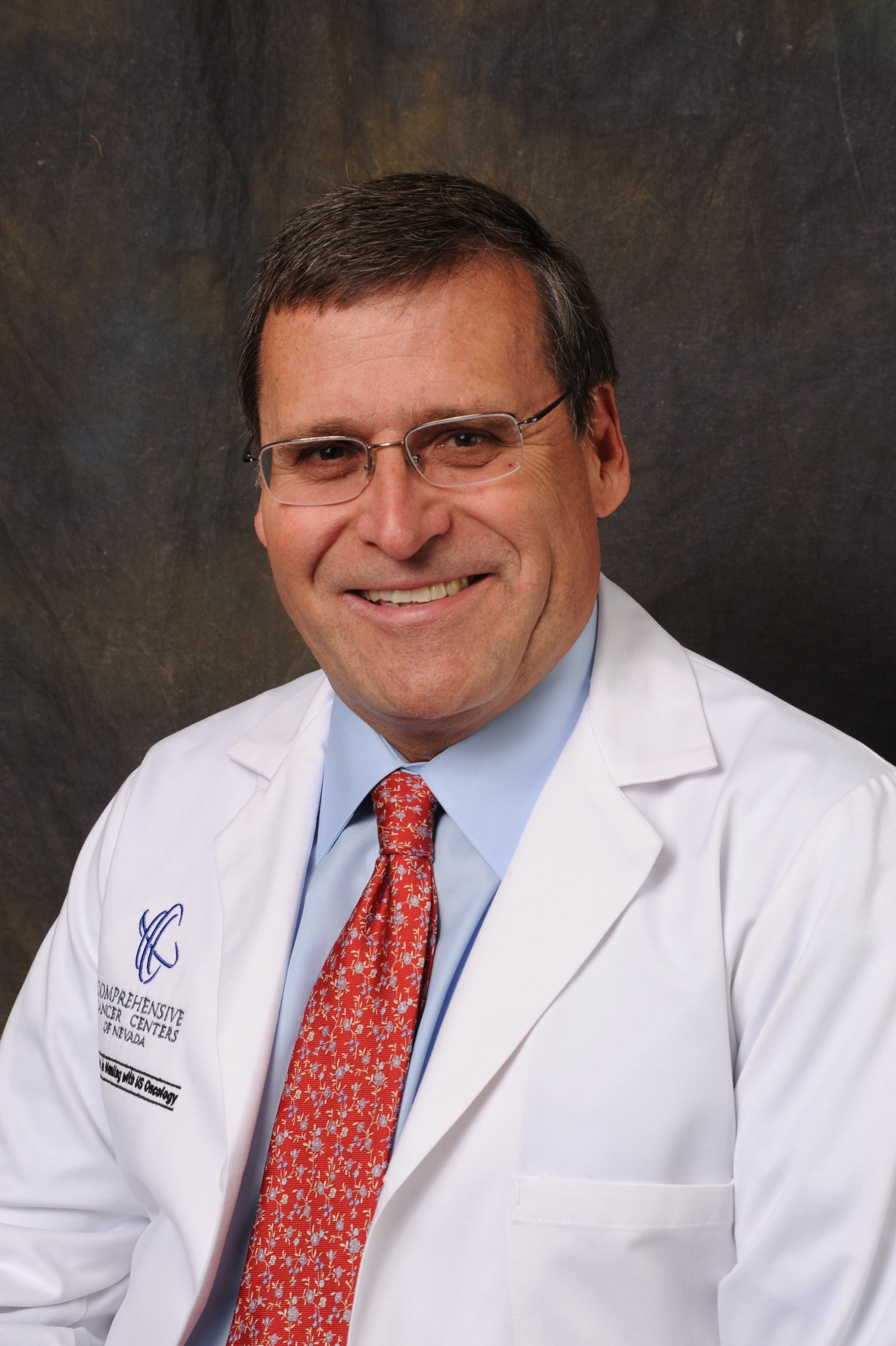
- Born: August 16, 1954 (age 72)
- Education: Ohio State University
- Occupation: Medical Oncologist
- Employer: Nevada Oncology Specialists
- Known for: Clinical and Translational Research

Wolfram Samlowski (born August 16, 1954) is an American medical oncologist with Nevada Oncology Specialists. His research interests include translational research, development of novel cancer immunotherapy agents, and translational drug development. His clinical interests are in developing more effective treatments for advanced stages of melanoma and non-melanoma skin cancers (such as squamous cell and basal cell, skin cancer, merkel cell carcinoma), and sarcoma.

== Career ==
Samlowski joined Nevada Oncology Specialists in 2025 as a medical oncologist He has been a Clinical Professor of Internal Medicine at the University of Nevada Las Vegas (UNLV) School of Medicine.

He was previously the Chief, Section of Melanoma, Renal Cancer and Immunotherapy as well as a Professor in the Oncology Department at the Nevada Cancer Institute in Las Vegas, Nevada, from 2007 to 2011.

Samlowski served as the Director of Translational Research, Multidisciplinary Melanoma Program at Huntsman Cancer Institute in Salt Lake City, Utah from 2000 to 2007.

During his tenure at University of Utah (1981–2007), Samlowski held many positions including various faculty appointments with the Hematology/Oncology program (1981–1997), Director, Cancer Immunotherapy Program (1987–2007) and Professor, Division of Oncology (1997–2007).

Samlowski earned his medical degree from the Ohio State University in 1978, completed his internal medicine residency at Wayne State University in Detroit, Michigan, and his clinical fellowship in hematology/oncology at the University of Utah in Salt Lake City, Utah.

== Professional honors ==
- Top Doctors by Vegas Seven magazine, 2014.
- Best Doctors by Desert Companion magazine, 2013.
- Healthcare Headliners by Vegas, Inc. magazine, 2012.
- Assistant Chief Medical Resident, Wayne State Univ., Detroit, Michigan, 1980–1981
- Veterans Administration Performance Award 1987
- America's Top Doctors (Castle Connolly)
- Americas Top Doctors for Cancer (Castle Connolly)

== Professional societies ==
- Fellow, American College of Physicians (ACP)
- American Federation of Clinical Research (AFCR)
- American Society for Clinical Oncology (ASCO)
- American Association for Cancer Research (AACR)
- Society for Biological Therapy of Cancer (iSBTc)
- Society for Pigment Cell and Melanoma Research

== Current research funding ==
None

== Patents ==
- Fowers KD, Zentner GM, Baudys M, Jurek M, Samlowski W: Formulations of lymphokines and method of use thereof for local or both local and systemic control of proliferative cell disorders (US Patent US2006/0159657, Europe 2739877.5-2108)
- Samlowski WE, Adams NB, McGregor JR: Gene therapy of cancer using an IL-2 transmembrane construct (US 7,407,777, World 2004/080404).
- Samlowski WE, Kondapaneni M, McGregor JR. Methods and compounds for the inhibition of eNOS activity. (US 5/23/06 US2007012410 Europe 5/23/07 077952298.4-1216)

== Published works ==
Natl. Cooperative Oncology Group Clinical Trial Authorship

- Evaluation of biologic markers that may predict sensitivity or resistance of recurrent or metastatic squamous cell carcinoma of the head and neck (SCCHN) to phase II chemotherapy agents: Pathology ancillary study (SWOG 9807). Primary study coordinator.
- Evaluation of the combination of docetaxel/carboplatin in patients with metastatic or recurrent squamous cell carcinoma of the head and neck (SCCHN)(SWOG 9902). Primary study coordinator.
- Evaluation of 3-hour infusion of paclitaxel plus cisplatin and 5-fluorouracil in patients with advanced/recurrent squamous cell carcinoma of the head and neck (SCCHN): Phase II (S0007). Co-investigator.
- A Phase II trial of imatinib mesylate (Gleevec) in neuroendocrine carcinoma of the skin (Merkel Cell Carcinoma) (S0331). Primary study coordinator.

=== Peer-reviewed publications ===
- Samlowski WE, Kondapaneni M, McGregor JR, Tharkar, S, Laubach VE, Salvemini D. Endothelial nitric oxide synthase (eNOS) is a key mediator of interleukin-2 (IL-2) induced hypotension and vascular leak syndrome. J Immunother 34:419-27, 2011.
- Eroglu Z, Kong M, Jakowatz JG, Akerly W, Samlowski W, Fruehauf JP. Phase II clinical trial evaluating docetaxel, vinorelbine and GM-CSF in stage IV melanoma. (in press, Cancer Chemother Pharmacol).
- Donepudi S, DeConti R, Samlowski WE. Recent advances in understanding the genetics etiology and treatment of Merkel cell carcinoma. (in press, Seminars in Oncology).
- Samlowski EE, Dechet C, Weissman A, Samlowski WE. Large cell non-Hodgkin’s lymphoma masquerading as renal carcinoma with IVC thrombosis: A case report. (in press, Journal of Medical Case Reports).

=== Book chapters, reviews, editorials and letters to editor ===
- Vogelzang, NJ; Benowitz, SI; Adams, S; Aghajanian, C; Chang, SM; Dreyer, ZE; Janne, PA; Ko, AH; Masters, GA; Odenike, O; Patel, JD; Roth, BJ; Samlowski, WE; Seidman, AD; Tap, WD; Temel, JS; Von Roenn, JH; Kris, MG (January 2013). "Clinical cancer advances 2011: Annual report on progress against cancer from the American Society of Clinical Oncology". J Clin Oncol. 30 (1): 88–109. doi:10.1200/jco.2011.40.1919. PMC 5075244. PMID 22147736.
- Eroglu Z, Kong M, Jakowatz JG, Akerly W, Samlowski W, Fruehauf JP. “Phase II clinical trial evaluating docetaxel, vinorelbine and GM-CSF in stage IV melanoma.” Cancer Chemother Pharmacol 68:1081-1087, 2011
- Wong B, Samlowski WE. Renal Cancer. In "Medical Therapy in Urology", Springer-Verlag, 2010. pp 17–31
- Hersh, EM; O'Day, SJ; Gonzales, R; Ribas, A; Samlowski, WE; Gordon, MS; Shechter, D; Clawson, A; Hawkins, MJ (2010). "A phase II trial of nab-paclitaxel in previously treated and chemotherapy naïve patients with metastatic malignant melanoma". Cancer. 116 (1): 155–163. doi:10.1002/cncr.24720. PMID 19877111.
- Samlowski, WE; Moon, J; Tuthill, RJ; Heinrich, MC; Balzer-Haas, NS; Merl, SA; DeConti, RC; Thompson, JA; Witter, MT; Flaherty, LE; Sondak, VK (2010). "A phase II trial of imatinib mesylate in Merkel cell carcinoma (neuroendocrine carcinoma of the skin): A Southwest Oncology Group phase II Study (S0331)". Am J Clin Oncol. 33 (5): 495–499. doi:10.1097/coc.0b013e3181b9cf04. PMC 2978644. PMID 20019577.
- Samlowski WE, Becker J. The Potential for Targeted Therapy of Merkel Cell Carcinoma. In Merkel Cell Carcinoma: A Multidisciplinary Approach by Sondak VK, Messina JL, Zager JS, Deconti RC, editors, Imperial College Press, London, United Kingdom 2010.
- Fawaz S, Samlowski WE. A commentary on current management strategies for brain metastases from "radioresistant" tumors. In Brain Metastases: Symptoms, Diagnosis and Treatment. (In press), Nova Science Publishers 2010.
- Loudyi A, Samlowski WE. Brain metastases from clear cell renal cancer. In: Tumors of the central nervous system. Hayat MA, ed. In press, Springer, New York 2010.
- Gonsalves-Shapiro D, Samlowski WE. Management of melanoma brain metastases in the era of targeted therapy. In: Melanoma: From Research to Treatment, Ascierto, PA, Kirkwood, JA, Marincola F, Palmieri G., eds, Hinawi, New York, (in press).

== In the media ==
- Avoiding doctors? Price of that decision may surprise you. Las Vegas Review-Journal, April 1, 2013
- New Drug Treats Advanced Melanoma. KLAS-TV Las Vegas, November 15, 2011
