= Maccabees Building =

Historic building in Detroit

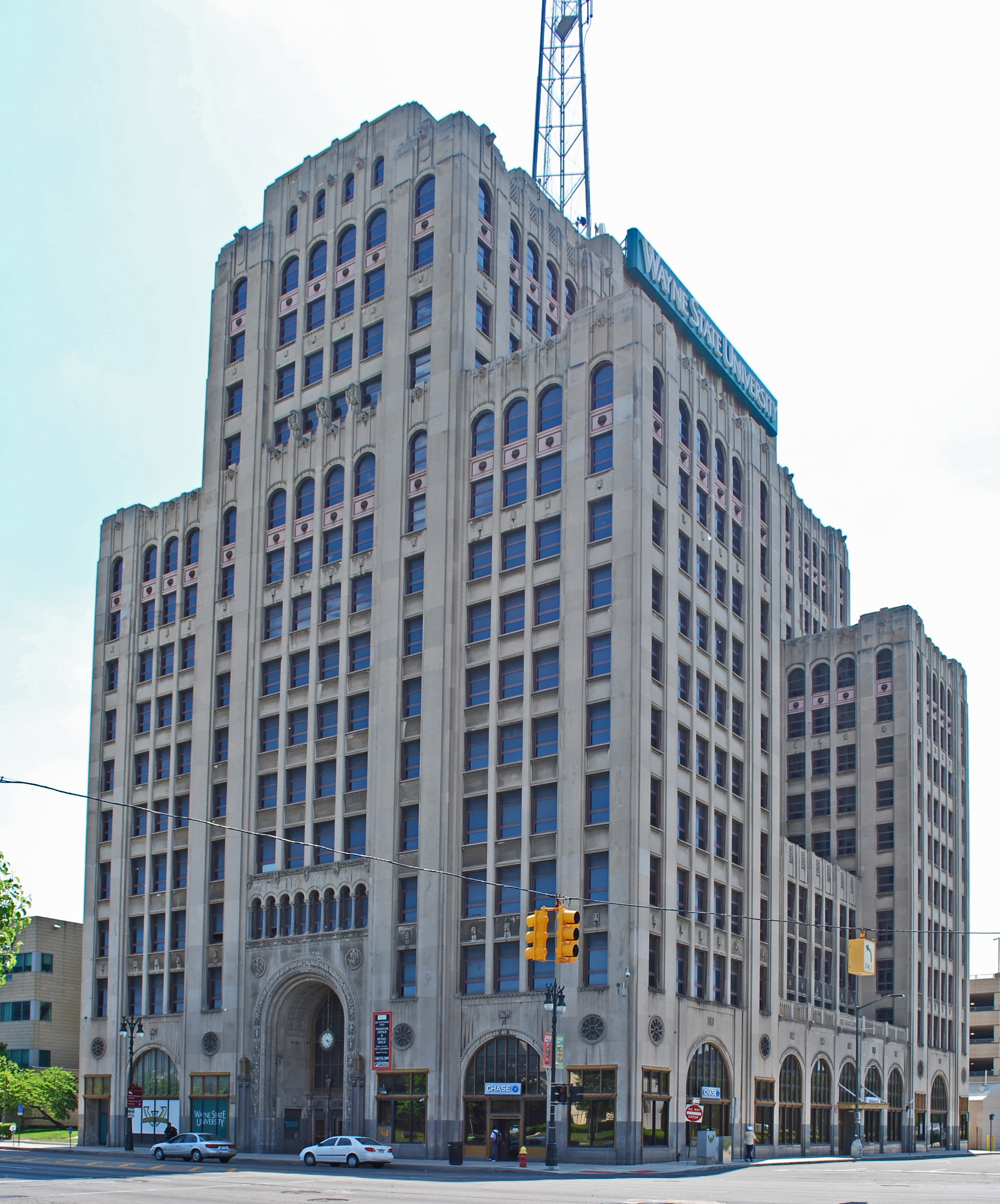

General information
- Type: office
- Location: 5057 Woodward Avenue; Detroit, Michigan
- Completed: 1927

Height
- Antenna spire: 465.9 ft (142.0 m)
- Roof: 196.9 ft (60.0 m)

Technical details
- Floor count: 15
- Floor area: 293,000 sq ft (27,220 m^{2})

Design and construction
- Architect: Albert Kahn

Other information
- Public transit: Warren Avenue; DDOT 4, 8, 16; SMART FAST Woodward 461, 462
- Maccabees Building
- U.S. National Register of Historic Places
- Coordinates: 42°21′28″N 83°3′56″W
- Built: 1927
- Architect: Albert Kahn
- Architectural style: Art Deco, Romanesque
- NRHP reference No.: 83003436
- Added to NRHP: July 7, 1983

The Maccabees Building (sometimes called Wayne Tower) is a historic building located at 5057 Woodward Avenue in Midtown Detroit, Michigan. It was listed on the National Register of Historic Places in 1983, and is currently owned by Wayne State University.

== Description ==
The building consists of a five-story base which covers the entire site. The nine-story spine sits above this rising to a height of 197 feet (60 m) with ten-story wings buttressing each corner. The building's exterior resembles the letter "H" with this clearly evident on the fourth through tenth story floorplans.

The high-rise truss tower features Art Deco and Romanesque details which include large arched windows on the ground and second level with rose windows accenting the second floor. Windows on the tenth and fourteenth floor are arched with decorative spandrel panels. The exterior is faced with limestone. The entrance is recessed in a three-story barrel vault arch which continues into the building to form the lobby ceiling.

The central section is topped by a radio broadcast tower. This served as the broadcast tower for WXYZ radio (both WXYZ-AM and WXYZ-FM [now WRIF]), and television, until the station moved to new facilities in 1959. WGPR radio now occupies transmission facilities on the tower, along with some data transmission equipment for Wayne State University. The height above ground to the tip of the antenna is 465.9 feet (142.0 m).

== History ==
Construction on the building began in 1926, and completed in 1927. The building was constructed for the fraternal organization Knights of the Maccabees which later established the Royal Maccabees Insurance Company.

Surplus space in the building was leased to other businesses, including retail business on the ground floor and office space in the upper floors. One noteworthy tenant was Detroit's radio and television station WXYZ which had its offices and later television studios and broadcast facilities in the Maccabees Building prior to 1959. From 1959 until 1987, the studios, transmitter, and broadcast tower were used by WDET-FM. During the 1950s, Soupy Sales performed in the lower level studio.

In 1960, the Maccabees Insurance Company relocated its headquarters to a new building in the northern suburb of Southfield. In 1986, it built new 251,000-square-foot (23,300 m^{2}) office building, once again in Southfield. These newer structures are also sometimes referred to as the Maccabees Building.

When the Maccabees organization vacated the building in 1960, the Detroit Public School System (DPS) purchased it for a headquarters. From 1960 to 2002, it served as the headquarters of Detroit Public Schools. It officially became the School Center Building but the Maccabees name remained visible on the exterior.

The Maccabees Building was added to the National Register of Historic Places in 1983. The use of grey stone and the architecture partially inspired the appearance of the Unity Tower.

In 2002, DPS paid the owner of the Fisher Building $24.1 million to purchase five floors to house administrative offices, citing the high cost of renovations needed at the Maccabees Building to comply with building and safety codes. That same year, Wayne State University purchased the Maccabees Building for additional space. The building houses administrative offices, communication equipment, retail space, and offices for a number of the university's academic departments as part of Wayne State's campus. After acquisition, initial reviews of the structure estimated that façade repairs would cost $1.95 million; upgrades to the fire alarm and emergency lighting systems, $960,000; repairs to utility shaft and exit stairways, $405,000; and elevator upgrades, $770,000.

The entire structure was renovated in 2004 and 2005 with second, third and fourteenth floors equipped to house the Wayne State University Computer Science Department.

On March 25, 2011, Wayne State University and Detroit Public Television announced they would jointly operate a television production studio in the space previously occupied by WXYZ-TV. The studio would reunite the entities who co-produced programs through the late 1970s. The space will be upgraded in phases to install new equipment and provide internships for students in the university's media arts programs.

On April 1, 2026, the building experienced a fire which was confined to a rooftop air circulation unit. No injuries were reported and all occupants evacuated safely.
