= Katharine L. Krol =

American interventional radiologist

Katharine Legg Krol, M.D., FSIR, FACR, is an American interventional radiologist. She was part of the original Palmaz and Wallstent trials for the treatment of peripheral arterial disease (PAD). She served as the president of the Society of Interventional Radiology (SIR) (2006–2007) – becoming the fourth woman to have held this position.

== Work and research ==
Her research includes that on the Zilver vascular stent for iliac artery disease as well as work on upper gastrointestinal radiography. Her involvement in SIR is also notable in the Health Policy and Economics division. She has published work on endovascular stroke coding, the effects of the ACA on medical practice, as well as the changes in code as they are affected by healthcare policy reform.

Krol's dedication to the field has been recognized by various honors and awards. She was awarded the U.S News Top Doctors in 2011 and 2012. Additionally, in 2015, the SIR Foundation awarded her with Philanthropist of the Year. In 2017, she was awarded the Gold Medal of the SIR, the highest honor given in the field of interventional radiology.

In 2020 Krol became chair of the Society of Interventional Radiology Foundation Board of Directors and in 2022 transitioned from chair to past-chair.
