= Pruneau (surname) =

Pruneau is a surname. Notable people with the surname include:

- Antoine Pruneau (born 1989), Canadian football defensive back
- Claude Pruneau, Canadian-American high energy physicist
