= Rita Richey =

Professor of instructional design

Academic background
- Education: Wayne State University
- Thesis: The effects of varying amounts of control upon the persistence and acquisition rate of community college students (1971)

Rita Carolyn Richey is a Professor Emeritus of Instructional Technology at Wayne State University. She is known for her work on instructional design and the history of the field of Instructional Technology.

== Education and academic career ==
From the University of Michigan, Richey first earned a Bachelor of Arts in English in 1964; then, a Masters of Arts in Psychology of Reading in 1968. In 1971, she was the first female to earn a Doctor of Philosophy in instructional technology from Wayne State University. In 1971, she joined the faculty of Wayne State University and retired from there in 2008. For the first 10 years, her focus was on teacher education. Then, in 1981, she transferred to the Instructional Technology Department and eventually became the program coordinator.

== Research ==
Richey developed an interest in instructional design theory and research methods even before the field was fully conceptualized. She published her first book, Theoretical and Conceptual Bases of Instructional Design in 1986 because she could not find any suitable textbooks to use with her students. In 1992 she followed with the Designing Instruction for the Adult Learner: Systemic Training Theory and Practice, and the 1994 book co-written with Barbara B. Seels Instructional Technology: The Definition and Domains of the Field was published. Richey developed competencies for teacher education, creating resources to be used by the field, and critically analyzed the variables which impact systems models. She International Board of Standards for Training Performance and Instructions (IBSTPI) for ten years where she worked on competency development. Her 2000 book, The Legacy of Robert M. Gagne, provided an overview of the role of Robert M. Gagné's theories both in school and outside of the school environment.

== Select publications ==
- Richey, Rita C.; Klein, James D. (2014), "Design and Development Research", in Spector, J. Michael; Merrill, M. David; Elen, Jan; Bishop, M. J. (eds.), Handbook of Research on Educational Communications and Technology, New York, NY: Springer, pp. 141–150, doi:10.1007/978-1-4614-3185-5_12, ISBN 978-1-4614-3185-5
- Richey, Rita C.; Klein, James D. (2005). "Developmental research methods: Creating knowledge from instructional design and development practice". Journal of Computing in Higher Education. 16 (2): 23–38. doi:10.1007/BF02961473. ISSN 1042-1726. S2CID 10879147.
- Richey, Rita C.; Klein, James D. (2014). Design and Development Research: Methods, Strategies, and Issues. doi:10.4324/9780203826034. ISBN 9780203826034.
- Instructional Technology : the Definition and Domains of the Field. Barbara B. Seels, Rita C. Richey. Bloomington, In.: Information Age Publishing. 2012. ISBN 978-1-61735-904-0. OCLC 817114562.
- Richey, Rita (2010). The instructional design knowledge base : theory, research, and practice. James D. Klein, Monica W. Tracey. New York: Routledge. ISBN 978-0-203-84098-6. OCLC 697633840.

== Awards and honors ==
Richey received the Distinguished Service Award from the Association for Educational Communications and Technology in 2000; the same association awarded her the James W. Brown Publication Award on three occasions. Wayne State University awarded her for excellence in teaching (1985), outstanding scholarly achievements by women faculty (2000), and she was named to their Academy of Scholars in 2002.
