= Jacquelyn Taylor =

American nurse scientist

Jacquelyn Yvette Taylor
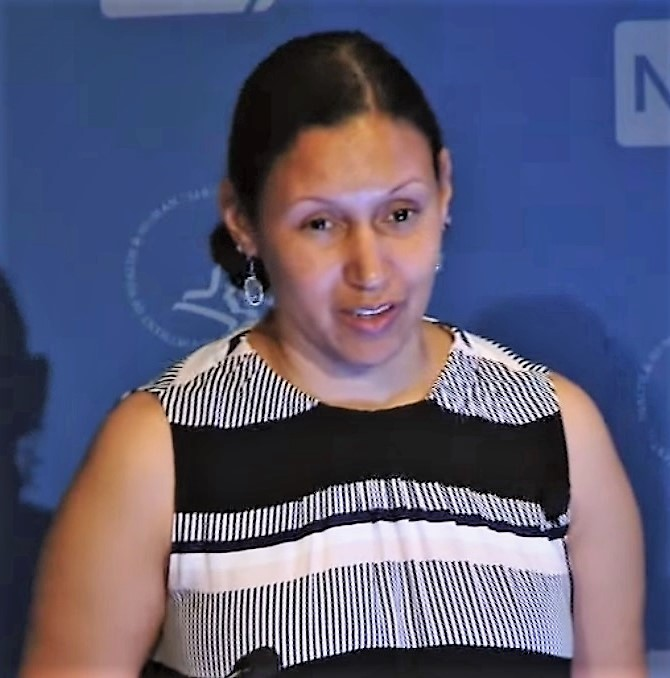
- 2018 NINR Director's Lecture
- Other name: Jacquelyn Long
- Education: Wayne State University, PhD, 2004; Washington University in St. Louis, Cardiovascular Genetic Epidemiology, 2009
- Awards: Presidential Early Career Awards for Scientists and Engineers, 2017
- Scientific career
- Fields: Genomics, Minority Health, Nursing Science
- Workplaces: Columbia University School of Nursing, 2020 – Present; New York University, 2018 – 2020; Yale School of Nursing, 2008 – 2017; University of Michigan, 2005 – 2008

Jacquelyn Taylor (née Long) is the Helen F. Petit Endowed Professor of Nursing at Columbia University School of Nursing (CUSON), where she is also the Founding Executive Director of the Center for Research on People of Color (CRPC). Dr. Taylor is also the Founding Executive Director of the Kathleen Hickey Endowed Lectureship on Cardiovascular Care, the first endowed lectureship honoring a nurse scientist at Columbia University. Additionally, Dr. Taylor holds an administrative role as Senior Advisor to the Chair of the Division of Cardiology at Columbia University Medical Center. Dr. Taylor has been a trailblazer in cardiovascular genomics research among minority populations, and diversity and inclusion efforts, having been the first black woman to earn tenure at CUSON, New York University School of Nursing, and the Yale School of Nursing. Dr. Taylor has been recognized for her contributions to the advancement of biomedical sciences, health care, and public health, having been elected to the National Academy of Medicine in 2019. Dr. Taylor is committed to mentoring and advancing health equity as she received the Columbia University Irving Medical Center 2021 Mentor of the Year Award and the 2021 Friends of the National Institute of Nursing Research (FNINR) President's Award for her significant work in race, culture, and disparities in healthcare. Dr. Taylor has been PI of many studies including, but not limited to, an R01 from National Institute of Nursing Research (NINR)- The Intergenerational Impact of Genetic and Psychological Factors on Blood Pressure (InterGEN), a Presidential Early Career Award for Scientists and Engineers (PECASE) award from President Obama in 2017, an MPI (multiple PI) on a P20 from NINR on Precision Health in Diverse Populations in 2018, an MPI on an R25 on Research Opportunities in Cardiovascular Diseases for Minority Undergrad and Grad Students Across the Health Sciences (RECV) in 2020, an MPI of the TRANSFORM TL1 in 2021, and MPI on a NHLBI funded T32 on Postdoctoral Training in Atherosclerosis in 2022. In 2023, she was awarded grants as MPI on an NHLBI funded R01 on 'The Impact of a race-Based stress reduction intervention on well-being, inflammation, and DNA methylation on Older African American Women at Risk for Cardiometabolic Disease' (RiSE) and a NIMHD funded R01 'Identifying and reducing stigmatizing language in home healthcare' (ENGAGE), and MPI of a U54 from NICHD on NY-Community-Hospital-Academic Maternal Health Equity Partnerships (NY-CHAMP), and PI of its training core. In addition to leading these grants, Dr. Taylor founded the Office of Diversity and Inclusion at the Yale School of Nursing and served as its inaugural Associate Dean of Diversity, and then went on to become the inaugural Endowed Chair of Health Equity and to develop and direct the Meyers Biological Laboratory at NYU before joining Columbia University.

== Education ==
She attended Wayne State University in Detroit, Michigan for both her undergraduate and graduate studies. There, she received her Bachelor of Science in Nursing in 1999, her Master of Science in Nursing in 2002, and her Doctor of Philosophy in 2004. She first joined a laboratory during her undergraduate studies, working under the mentorship of Joseph Dunbar, who was the chair of the department of physiology. Her research at the university evolved over the years to ultimately studying the genetics of hypertension, focusing on multiple generations of African American women .

== Career and research ==
In 2005, Taylor became an assistant professor of nursing at the University of Michigan. In 2008, she moved to Connecticut, where she became Associate Professor and Associate Dean of Diversity and Inclusion at Yale School of Nursing. While at Yale, she was Contact PI on a five-year study, receiving funding support from the National Institute of Nursing Research at the National Institutes of Health. The study, known as the Intergenerational Impact of Genetic and Psychological Factors on Blood Pressure (InterGEN) study, investigated the combined impact of genetic, environmental, and psychological stressors on blood pressure, with a focus on members of the African American community.

During her tenure, she also began to study the genomics of lead poisoning in response to the ongoing Flint water crisis, developing a method to simultaneously measure lead levels and test genotypes of children to identify genetic factors that increased risk of long-term damage. As a graduate student at Wayne State, she also investigated the interplay between gene variants and environmental exposure to lead among children in Detroit. She identified a correlation between children with a variant of the gene that codes for arylsulfatase A (ASA) and an increased risk of neurodevelopmental damage as a result of exposure to lead.

In 2018, Taylor joined the faculty at New York University, becoming the inaugural Vernice D. Ferguson Professor in Health Equity where she remained until 2020. There, she served as the co-Principal Investigator on a five-year grant award, which established the NYU Meyers Center for Precision Health in Diverse Populations. The center would train nurse scientists to study chronic conditions and their underlying biology, with the goal of reducing their burden on marginalized communities. In 2020, she became the Helen F. Petit Professor of Nursing, Founder and Executive Director for the Center for Research on People of Color at Columbia University School of Nursing.

Throughout her career, Taylor has also been an advocate for improving precision health in minority populations — with a focus on health equity, social determinants of health, and cardiovascular genomics .

== Awards and honors ==
- Elected Fellow, American Academy of Nursing, 2011
- Elected Fellow, American Heart Association, 2015
- Presidential Early Career Award for Scientists and Engineers, 2017
- Elected Member, National Academy of Medicine, 2019

== Select publications ==
- Taylor, Jacquelyn Y.; Wright, Michelle L.; Housman, David (June 22, 2016). "Lead toxicity and genetics in Flint, MI". npj Genomic Medicine. 1 16018: 16018–. doi:10.1038/npjgenmed.2016.18. PMC 4936820. PMID 27398227.
- Crusto, Cindy A.; Barcelona de Mendoza, Veronica; Connell, Christian M.; Sun, Yan V.; Taylor, Jacquelyn Y. (July 2016). "The Intergenerational Impact of Genetic and Psychological Factors on Blood Pressure Study (InterGEN): Design and Methods for Recruitment and Psychological Measures". Nursing Research. 65 (4): 331–338. doi:10.1097/NNR.0000000000000163. PMC 4930011. PMID 27362519.
- Taylor, Jacquelyn Y.; Sun, Yan; Barcelona de Mendoza, Veronica; Ifatunji, Mosi; Rafferty, Jane; Fox, Ervin R.; Musani, Solomon K.; Sims, Mario; Jackson, "James S. (October 2017). "The Combined Effects of Genetic Risk and Perceived Discrimination on Blood Pressure Among African Americans in the Jackson Heart Study". Medicine. 96 (43) e8369. doi:10.1097/MD.0000000000008369. PMC 5671860. PMID 29069027.
- Taylor, Jacquelyn Y.; Barcelona de Mendoza, Veronica (January 2018). "Improving -Omics-Based Research and Precision Health in Minority Populations: Recommendations for Nurse Scientists". Journal of Nursing Scholarship. 50 (1): 11–19. doi:10.1111/jnu.12358. PMC 5935491. PMID 29140597. S2CID 19079811.
