= Warren Rovetch =

American writer (1926–2017)

Warren Rovetch (1926-2017) was an American author and traveler. He was also known for writing books in The Creaky Traveler series.

== Early life ==
Born in Detroit in 1926, Rovetch completed his undergraduate studies at Wayne University in Detroit and graduate studies at Oxford (Balliol College), where he was a Sir Robert Mayer Fellow and Fulbright Scholar, receiving his M Phil. in economics in 1951.

He became an avid traveler of the world. His journeys began in 1946, with a yearlong adventure through six countries of Europe. In England, he spent nearly six months giving current-events talks for the United States Information Agency and lectures on American history for a British army officers training program. Over the rest of the 20th century and into the 21st, Rovetch and Gerda Fox, his wife of 65 years made 25 extended trips to Europe.

== Career ==
Rovetch has been a government economist, an industrial engineer, a regional director for the Foreign Policy Association and a consultant to colleges and universities, school systems, and state governments. The first of his enterprises was Education Research Associates. He planned and developed the Metropolitan Youth Education Center, a joint program of the Denver and Jefferson County school systems to cope with dropouts. He then directed the study, Post Secondary Education in the Denver Metropolitan Area, for the Joint Budget Committee of the Colorado Legislature. The findings led the legislature to establish Metropolitan State College.

His next effort was Education & Economic Systems [EES], with a focus on planning and public priorities. His examination of South Carolina's education, health, transportation and other needs, Opportunity and Growth in South Carolina, 1968-85, became "the crucible for South Carolina's progressive, post-segregation ambition," according to Philip P. Grose's book, South Carolina at the Brink. With EES and then with his firm Campus Facilities Associates, Rovetch did management and planning studies for the University of Chicago, City University of New York, Ohio Board of Regents, Rutgers, California State University, Iowa State University, and other institutions.

Foundations for Learning, his next enterprise, published textbooks and trained teachers to achieve a new paradigm of teaching and learning. Schools in Boston, Miami, Chicago, San Francisco, and Los Angeles were involved in the Foundations program which Simon & Schuster acquired. Rovetch then went on to establish Columbia River Properties and developed an environmentally-based education and conference center on the Lewis and Clark Water Trail of the Lower Columbia River.

== Books ==
Rovetch has written two books of his travel experiences. The first, The Creaky Traveler in the North West Highlands of Scotland documents Rovetch and his wife's exploration of the hidden places and cultural and spiritual dimensions of Britain's last wilderness, the rugged coast of North West Scotland. T.M. Devine, noted author of The Scottish Nation, wrote that Rovetch, "captures the magic of the North West Highlands of Scotland and brings to life its remarkable history, traditions, and captivating scenery."

Next, in The Creaky Traveler in Ireland – Clare, Kerry, and West Cork, Rovetch continues his theme of travel and adventure at any age, including "mobile but not agile" travelers. In addition to describing stays at B&Bs and exchanges with locals, Rovetch explores history and culture to give the reader a deeper sense of the places he and his wife visit. Jimmy Deenihan, TD for Kerry North stated:

"It would be impossible to confine The Creaky Traveler to a single genre. It is a combination of short stories, memoir, travel guide, journal, and history book. Rovetch's amusing tales of traveling mishaps are as likely to provoke laughter as his sharp insights about beauty and spirituality are to bring about sincere contemplation."

Both books include a detailed section on planning and managing travel. In a different mode, Rovetch, together with John J. Gaskie, wrote Program Budgeting for Planners: A Case Study of Appalachia With Projections Through 1985. This work was done for the Appalachian Regional Commission, a federal-state partnership for economic development involving thirteen states and 205,000 square miles (530,900 km^{2}) along the spine of the Appalachian Mountains, from southern New York to northern Mississippi. The study details a system for setting priorities, establishing program, determining program costs, and measuring program results.

In Rovetch's latest book, a memoir titled; Tales of a Footloose American: 1941-1951, Rovetch looks back over seventy years from managing a high school nightclub to the 1946 World Student Congress in Prague, then on to Belgrade and a confrontation with Tito, escape out of a train window in Ljubljana, turning down the general's mistress in Trieste, living with El Greco in Rome and other adventures In Paris and London, ending with a degree from Oxford and happy marriage.

Rovetch has also written several smaller publications on social and political issues with the US economy.

== Bibliography ==
- Rovetch, Warren (2012). Tales of a Footloose American – 1941-1951. Jakes Books. ISBN 978-0-615-51707-0.
- Rovetch, Warren (2006). The Creaky Traveler in Ireland – Clare, Kerry, and West Cork. Sentient Publications. ISBN 1-59181-027-2.
- Rovetch, Warren (2002). The Creaky Traveler in the North West Highlands of Scotland. Sentient Publications. ISBN 0-9710786-7-X.
- Program Budgeting for Planners: A Case Study of Appalachia with Projections Through 1985. Praeger Publications. 1974. ISBN 0-275-28734-3.
