= Scott Dulchavsky =

American surgeon

- Dr. Scott Dulchavsky
- Education: Duke University, Wayne State University School of Medicine, Michigan State University
- Occupations: Chairman of Surgery, Henry Ford Health System
- Scientific career
- Workplaces: Henry Ford Hospital, Wayne State University School of Medicine, SUNY Stony Brook

Scott Alexander Dulchavsky is the Roy D. McClure Chairman of Surgery and Surgeon-in-Chief at the Henry Ford Hospital and Professor of Surgery, Molecular Biology and Genetics at the Wayne State University School of Medicine.
