= Lawrence Patrick =

American academic

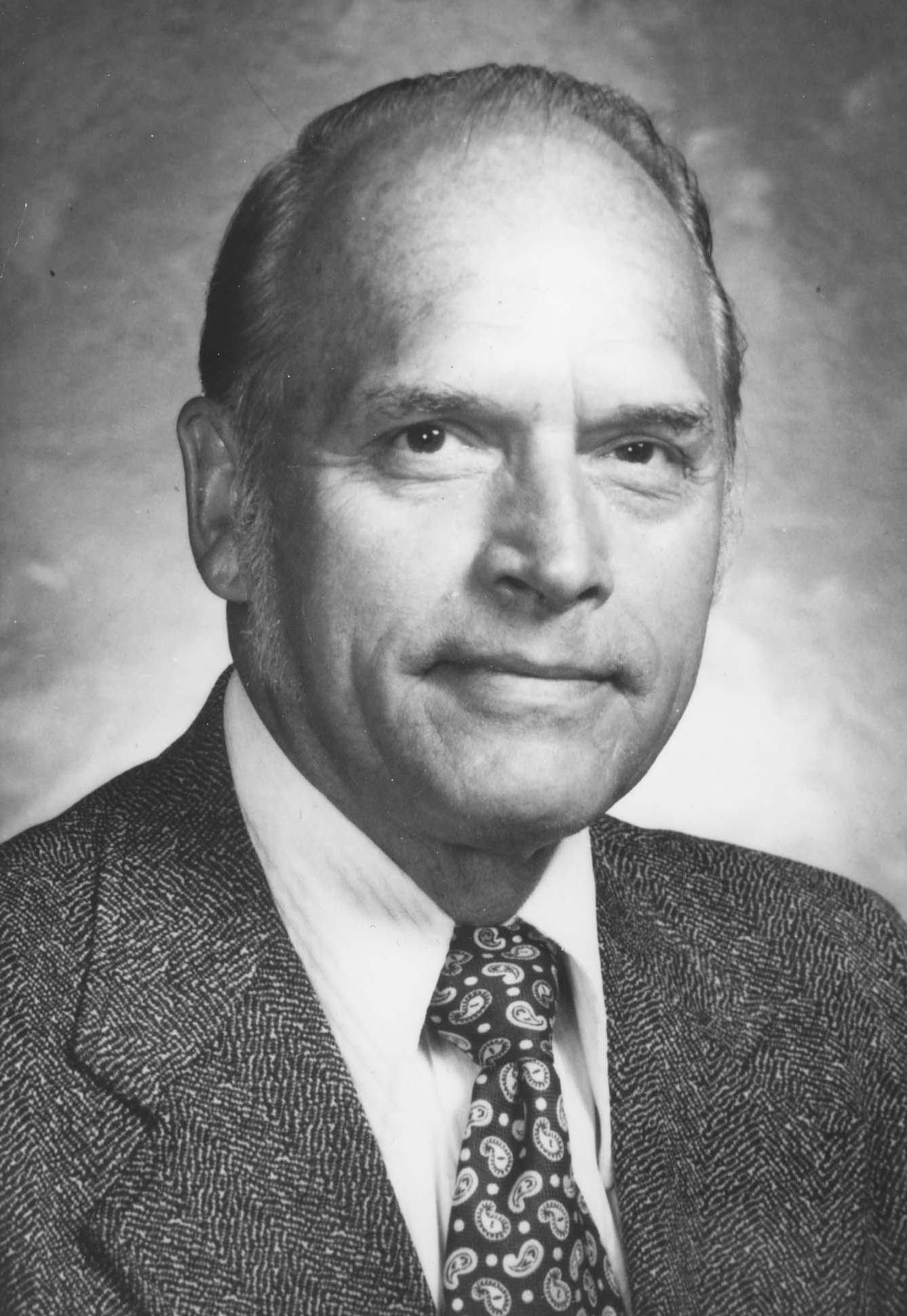
- Lawrence Patrick
- Born: 1920; Detroit, Michigan, U.S.
- Died: April 30, 2006 (aged 85–86); Hendersonville, North Carolina
- Education: Wayne State University
- Occupations: Researcher, Educator
- Known for: Early pioneer in impact biomechanics, Automotive safety design improvements, Invention of the air bag
- Spouse: Bess Patrick

Lawrence Patrick (1920 – April 30, 2006) was an American scientist and researcher who is considered one of the fathers of the crash test dummy. Between 1960 and 1975, while a biomechanics professor at Detroit's Wayne State University, Patrick described his work by saying "I was a human crash-test dummy". Patrick allowed himself to be subject to over 400 rocket sled rides, crushing blows to the head and body, and other forms of physical abuse in an effort to develop a body of data on how the human body responded in a vehicle accident. One of his students, Harold Mertz, went on to develop Hybrid III, the current worldwide standard crash test dummy. Lawrence also subjected himself to a 50 pound pendulum to the breast plate to test the effects of a steering column on a human. Lawrence died of Parkinson's disease on April 30, 2006, at the age of 85.
