= Sergei Voloshin =

American physicist (born 1953)

- Born: February 18, 1953 (age 73); Donetsk, Ukraine
- Education: Moscow Engineering Physics Institute
- Known for: Relativistic heavy ion collisions
- Awards: Fellow of American Physical Society, elected to WSU Academy of Scholars
- Scientific career
- Fields: Physics
- Workplaces: University of Heidelberg; University of Pittsburgh; LBNL; Wayne State University

Sergei Voloshin (born February 18, 1953) is a Russian-American experimental high-energy nuclear physicist and Professor of Physics at Wayne State University. He is best known for his work on event-by-event physics in heavy ion collisions.

== Career ==
Sergei Voloshin studied physics at Moscow Engineering Physics Institute, where he completed his PhD in nuclear physics in 1980 and became a faculty member at the Department of Theoretical Physics. During the period from 1992 to 1999 he was a visiting scientist at the University of Pittsburgh, Physikalische Institute (University of Heidelberg) and Lawrence Berkeley National Laboratory (LBNL) where he worked on anisotropic flow and event-by-event physics in nuclear collisions at SPS and RHIC. In 1999 Dr. Voloshin joined the Department of Physics and Astronomy at Wayne State University.

== Work ==
One of the best known Voloshin's contribution is the analysis and interpretation of the so-called anisotropic flow in heavy ion collisions. He played a leading role in the discovery of the strong elliptic flow at RHIC. Large elliptic flow, consistent with calculations from ideal hydrodynamics, was a key to the concept of strongly interacting Quark Gluon Plasma, a new form of matter discovered at RHIC. The idea of the constituent quark scaling, proposed by Voloshin, and its observation at RHIC is widely regarded as a proof for a deconfinement phase transition. His recent research interests include studies of possible local parity violation in strong interaction in heavy ion collisions.

Dr. Voloshin is a member of the STAR Collaboration performing experiments at Relativistic Heavy Ion Collider (RHIC) at Brookhaven National Laboratory (BNL), and the ALICE Collaboration at Large Hadron Collider (LHC) at CERN.

== Honors ==
- Elected a Fellow of American Physical Society in 2008 "for numerous seminal contributions to the methods and interpretation of collective flow in relativistic nuclear collisions”.
- Inducted to Wayne State University's Academy of Scholars in 2012.
