= David Fasenfest =

American sociologist

- Born: Germany
- Education: University of Michigan
- Scientific career
- Fields: Urban Sociology
- Workplaces: Wayne State University

David Fasenfest is an American sociologist who is an associate professor at Wayne State University. He received his Ph.D. from the University of Michigan in 1984. He also holds a M.A. in economics and Chinese studies. His research interests include urban sociology, race/class/gender, labor markets and workforce development, income inequality, and community economic development.

He has been an active urban sociologist, editing and publishing several articles and books. His activities and work include:

- Editor, Critical Sociology SAGE UK (July 1998 to present)
- Book Series Editor, Studies in Critical Social Sciences, Brill Academic Publishers, Leiden, NL (2003 to present)
- Executive Board, Citizens for a Sound Energy Future, Indianapolis, IN (January 2006 to December 2007)
- Board Member, Energy Future Institute, Indianapolis, IN (April 2006 to December 2007)

Fasenfest was fêted with a festschrift.

== Publications ==
=== Books ===
- Engaging Social Justice: Critical Studies of 21st Century Social Transformation (Brill, 2009) (ed.)
- Power and Resistance: Intersecting Generations of Critical Social Science (Brill, 2009) (ed., with Richard Dello Buono)
- Global Social Change: Movement Building and the Eclipse of Neoliberalism (Brill, 2009) (ed., with Graham Cassano)
- Critical Evaluation of Local Development Policies (Wayne State University Press, 2004) (ed., with Laura Reese)
- Community Economic Development: Policy Formation in the U.S. and U.K. (Macmillan Press, 1993)
