= Renate Soulen =

American physician (born 1933)

Renate L. Soulen (born June 10, 1933) is an American physician. She is credited as one of three women co-founders of the Society for CardioVascular and Interventional Radiology (now Society of Interventional Radiology), a founding member of the Philadelphia Angio Club, and the first female president of the Philadelphia Roentgen Ray Society.

== Early life and education ==
Soulen's family emigrated from Germany to England in 1933 and to the United States in 1946. Soulen obtained her medical degree from the Women's Medical College of Pennsylvania, the only all-female medical school in the United States at the time, in 1957. She completed a residency in radiology at Thomas Jefferson University Medical College in 1963.

== Career ==
Soulen spent much of her career at Temple University, and served as section chief from 1969 to 1985. In 1989, she became a professor of radiology at Wayne State University and director of magnetic resonance imaging at Detroit Medical Center until her retirement in 2005.

In 1978, Soulen served as chair for the Society of Interventional Radiology's third annual meeting.

Soulen has been the recipient of the President's Award by the American Association of Women Radiologists and the Gold Medal by the Society of Interventional Radiology.
