= Critical Power Coalition =

The Critical Power Coalition (CPC) is a non-profit consortium whose member companies include Caterpillar Inc.; Cummins Power Generation; MTU Detroit Diesel Power Generation; Digital Power Group; Eaton Corporation; Eaton Corporation / Powerware Division; EDSA; EnerSys; Holder Construction; Liebert / Emerson Electric; MGE UPS Systems; Power Management Concepts; S&C Electric Company; Siemens Energy & Automation; and Square D /Schneider Electric.

The CPC's mission is to address operational, technological, and policy-related issues regarding on-site quality, reliability, and continuity of electric power where and when it is vital. Over the past two decades, data centers, financial institutions, hospitals, airports, telecommunications facilities, emergency response centers, and manufacturing plants, have invested in hardware, systems, software, and engineering services to ensure the uninterrupted supply of high-quality, ultra-reliable power to keep critical facilities and equipment operating when grid power is either inadequate or fails. For example, following the North American Northeast Blackout of 2003, research among data center operators showed that – of 500 companies surveyed – nearly half experienced significant financial losses, with 10% of them experiencing losses exceeding $1 million (U.S.).

The CPC is dedicated to addressing the continued divergence inherent in two core trends: as conventional grid power inherent limitations and vulnerabilities grow, many private sector and government operations are increasingly dependent on digital equipment that is collaterally dependent on critical-quality electricity.

The CPC is the first non-profit organization for users and providers of Critical Power, with a mission to:

- Create awareness within, or coordinate with, relevant public and private organizations where critical power issues are, or should be, more fully addressed
- Provide information, training, and educational programs to assist private and public operations that require higher power quality, security, and continuity
- Work collaboratively with industry and government organizations to develop or support relevant critical power initiatives
- Differentiate the critical power industry from the traditional grid power industry.

== External sources ==
- The Critical Power Coalition
