= Critical Sociology (journal) =

- Discipline: Sociology
- Language: English
- Edited by: David Fasenfest

Publication details
- Former name: The Insurgent Sociologist
- History: 1969-present
- Publisher: SAGE Publications
- Frequency: Bimonthly
- Impact factor: 1.9 (2022)

Standard abbreviations
- ISO 4: Crit. Sociol.

Indexing
- ISSN: 1569-1632
- LCCN: 88657600
- OCLC no.: 231886830

Links
- Journal homepage; Online access; Online archive

Critical Sociology is a peer-reviewed academic journal that publishes papers six times a year in the field of sociology. The journal's editor is David Fasenfest (Wayne State University). It has been in publication since 1969 and is currently published by SAGE Publications. In the past, it has been published by Brill Publishers. According to the Journal Citation Reports, the journal has a 2022 impact factor of 1.9, ranking it 84th out of 149 journals in the category "Sociology".

== Scope ==
Critical Sociology aims to encourage critical thinking by publishing articles from all perspectives defined as falling within the boundaries of critical or radical social science. The journal publishes work which explores the relationship between race, gender and class. Critical Sociology also provides a forum for the discussion of research and findings.

== History ==
Critical Sociology was established in 1969, originally under the name of The Insurgent Sociologist. It emerged from radical agitation within the American Sociology Association in the wake of the '68 radical movement. Since then the journal has become a key pole of radical and critical research in the social sciences.

== Abstracting and indexing ==
Critical Sociology is abstracted and indexed in the following databases:

- Social Sciences Citation Index
- Criminal Justice Abstracts
- Educational Research Abstracts Online
- International Bibliography of the Social Sciences
- SCOPUS
- Studies on Women and Gender Abstracts
- The Philosopher's Index
- Criminal Justice Abstracts
- International Political Science Abstracts
- CSA Worldwide Political Science Abstracts
