= Oxana Narozniak =

Ukrainian artist

Oxana Narozniak is a Ukrainian artist currently residing in Rio de Janeiro, Brazil. She participated in the international art exhibition "Progress of the World's Women," shown at the United Nations lobby as part of the U.N. "Women 2000" conference. Narozniak has also had solo exhibits at the Museo H. Stern in Rio de Janeiro and at the São Paulo Museum of Art. Her work has been displayed at the Miami Beach Botanical Garden.
