= Nancy Lenoil =

American archivist

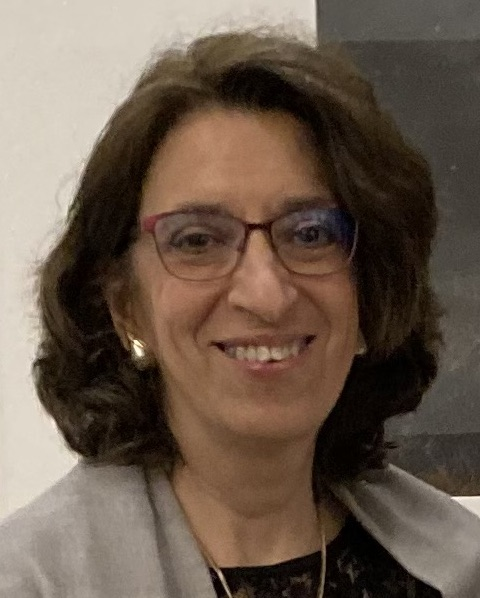
- photograph of Nancy Zimmelman Lenoil
- Education: Wayne State University
- Employer: California State Archives
- Title: State Archivist of California (retired)

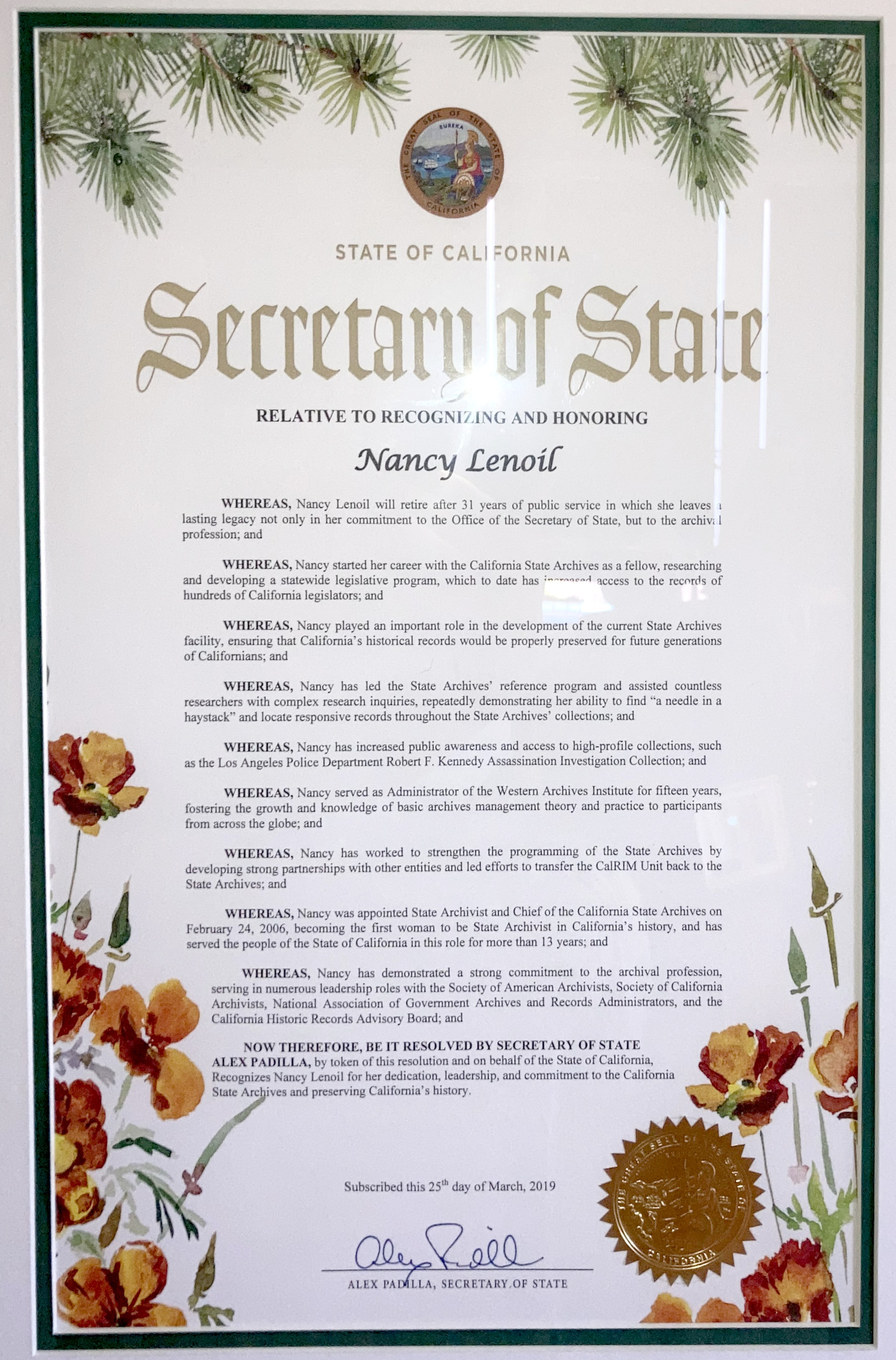
California Secretary of State proclamation recognizing and honoring Nancy Lenoil

Nancy Zimmelman Lenoil is an American who served as the State Archivist of California from 2006-2019.

== Synopsis ==
Nancy Ann Zimmelman was born in Detroit, Michigan, the daughter of William and Phyllis (Bargebuhr) Zimmelman. Her father was an engineer and instructor in his 42 year career for Ford Motor Company. She earned a bachelor's degree in history from Oakland University and a master's degree in history, with graduate certificate in archival administration, from Wayne State University. She moved to the Sacramento, California region in 1987 for a ten month fellowship in archival administration, which turned into a 31 year career at the California State Archives. She married Robert Lenoil in 2007, and had boy/girl twins in 2010. Nancy and Robert are active in the Sacramento Jewish community; she served ten years on the board of trustees for the Jewish Federation of the Sacramento Region and served on the board of trustees of Temple Or Rishon.

== Career ==
Lenoil began her work at the California State Archives in 1987. From 1992-2007 she served as the Administrator of the Western Archives Institute, an intensive, two-week instructional program sponsored by the State Archives. From 1994-2006, her duties included being in charge of the Archive's records of the Assassination of Robert F. Kennedy. She started teaching a class for the California Highway Patrol's Protection of Public Officials program in 1997, using the actual records and artifacts in the collection. She received a commendation from the CHP for her work.

In 2006 California Secretary of State Bruce McPherson appointed Lenoil as California's State Archivist, the first woman to hold that position. During her tenure the State Archives launched several initiatives, including a partnership with the Google Cultural Institute. Three collections were made available online, which Lenoil said was one step in the process of making records more accessible to the public. Lenoil spearheaded the effort to transfer responsibility for the management of state records from the Department of General Services to the State Archives, which passed as part of the fiscal year 2014 budget.

Lenoil has been active in professional organizations throughout her career - serving on and chairing committees, presenting at conferences, and publishing articles. Past and present memberships include the Society of American Archivists, Society of California Archivists, Academy of Certified Archivists, Council of State Archivists, and the National Association of Government Archives and Records Administrators. Her contributions to the profession led to her being named a Distinguished Fellow of the Society of American Archivists in 2012, the highest honor in the profession. In 2023 the Society of California Archivists awarded her their Career Achievement Award.

While the State Archivist serves at the pleasure of the Secretary of State, Lenoil retained the position under Secretaries of State McPherson, Debra Bowen and Alex Padilla, until her retirement in May of 2019.

== Publications ==
- "A*CENSUS: Report on Continuing Education" (PDF). The American Archivist. 69 (Fall/Winter 2006): 367–395. 1 September 2006.
- John F. Burns and Nancy Lenoil (2009). "The First California Statute: Legal History and the California State Archives" (PDF). California Legal History. 4: 443–476.
- "The Western Archives Institute: Meeting the Need for Grassroots Education Across the West (and Beyond)" (PDF). The American Archivist. 74 (2011/supplement): 306:18–306:25. 14 December 2013.
- "Oral History and the California State Archives" (PDF). California Legal History. 10: 243–245. 2015.

== Videos ==
- Because of My OU History Degree, I'm Accomplished. Oakland University. 9 January 2020.
