= Michigan Life Sciences Corridor =

Biotechnology initiative in the U.S. state of Michigan

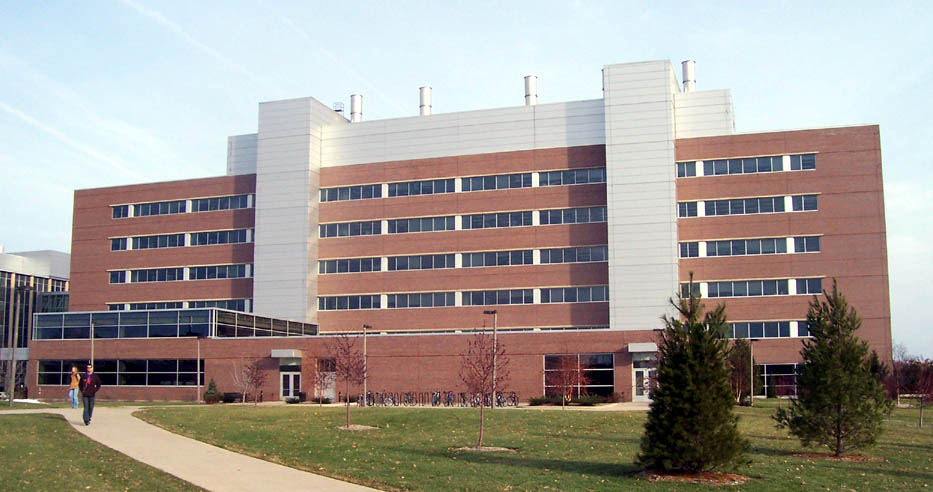
Michigan State University Biomedical and Physical Sciences Building.

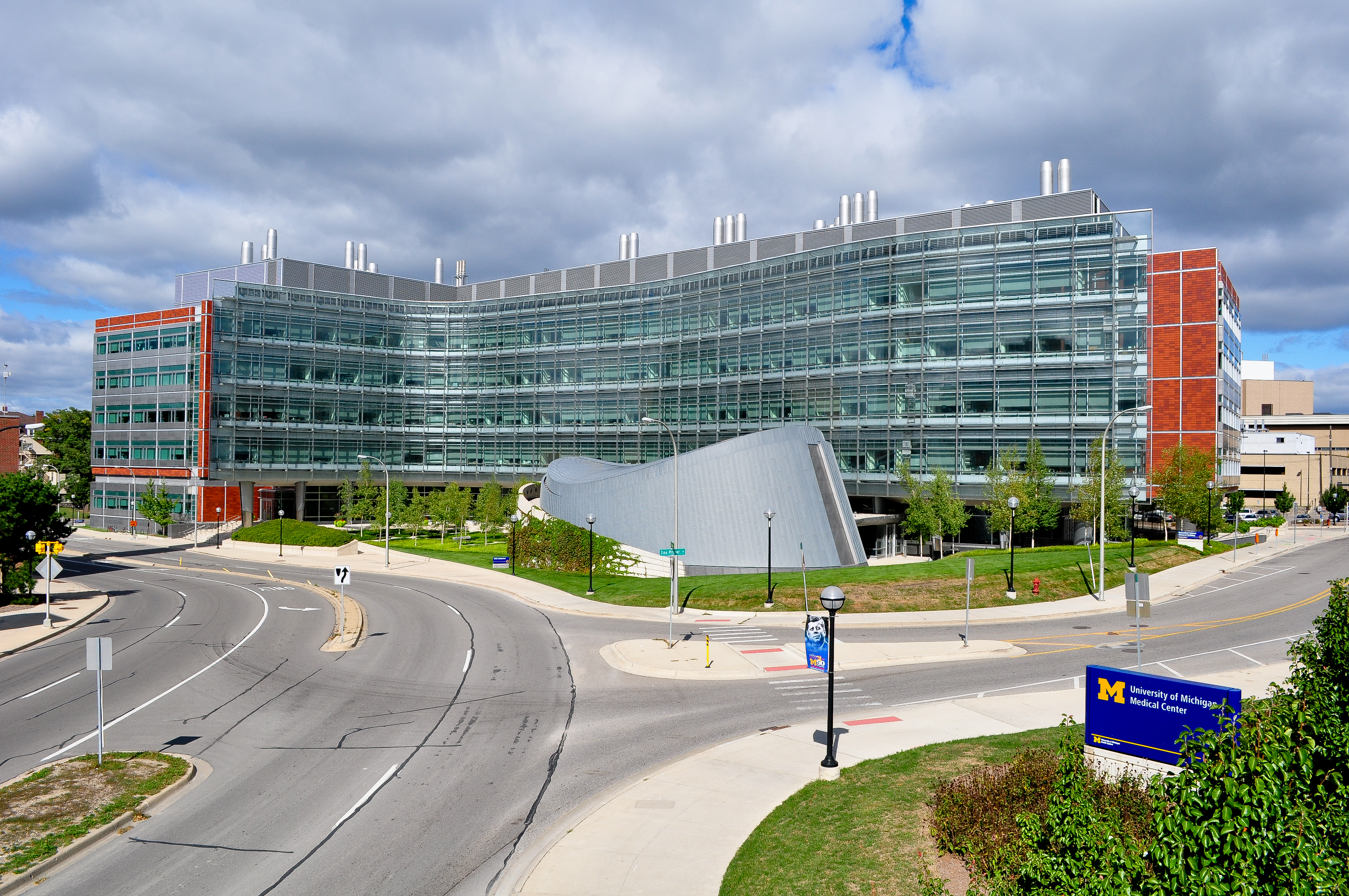
University of Michigan Biomedical Science Building, a 2007 AIA honor award winner.

The Michigan Life Sciences Corridor (MLSC) is a $1 billion biotechnology initiative in the U.S. state of Michigan.

The MLSC invests in biotech research at four Michigan institutions: the University of Michigan in Ann Arbor; Michigan State University in East Lansing; Wayne State University in Detroit; and the Van Andel Institute in Grand Rapids.

The Michigan Economic Development Corporation administers the program. It began in 1999 with money from the state's settlement with the tobacco industry. When the program's funds distributions are completed in 2019, the goal is that the investments in high tech research will have notably expanded the state's economic base.

== History ==
In 1998, the State of Michigan, along with 45 other states, reached the $8.5 billion Tobacco Master Settlement Agreement, a settlement with the U.S. tobacco industry. Former Governor John Engler created the Michigan Life Sciences Corridor in 1999 when he signed Public Act 120 of 1999. The bill appropriated money from the state's settlement with the tobacco industry to fund biotech research at four of Michigan's largest research institutions.

Under the management of the Michigan Economic Development Corporation, the MLSC allocated $1 billion over the course of 20 years, including $50 million in 1999 to fund research on aging. The following year, the MLSC awarded $100 million to 63 Michigan universities. In 2002, Governor Jennifer Granholm incorporated the MLSC into the Michigan Technology Tri-Corridor, adding funding for homeland security and alternative fuel research.

In 2009, the University of Michigan added a 30-building, 174-acre (0.70 km^{2}) North Campus Research Complex by acquiring the former Pfizer pharmaceutical corporation facility.

A BioEnterprise Midwest Healthcare Venture report found that Michigan attracted $451.8 million in new biotechnology venture capital investments from 2005 to 2009.

== See also ==
- University Research Corridor
