= John Sawruk =

John Sawruk (November 23, 1946 – November 12, 2008) was an American executive. He was also the official historian of the Pontiac Motor Division of GM.

John was a licensed engineer, receiving his Bachelor of Science in mechanical engineering from the New Jersey Institute of Technology and his MBA from Wayne State University.

In 1978, a highlight of this career was presented with the prestigious Boss Kettering Award from General Motors. He held a U.S. patent for an engine with charge equalizing intake manifold on the 4-cylinder “Iron Duke” engine.

After retiring, John enjoyed attending car enthusiast events, often speaking at technical sessions of the GTO Association of America (GTOAA). He would bring his black 1971½ Pontiac GT-37, a rare car of historical significance. Pontiac only produced a few thousand of the GT-37's in 1970 and 1971, a car based on the same body platform as the more numerous and popular Pontiac GTO.

== Career time line ==
- 1967 - Internship at General Motors
- 1968 - Began GM career as an Entry-level engineer in the Special Problems Laboratory
- 1969 - Engineer in Experimental Engine Group
- 1970 - Project manager for unleaded fuel
- 1974 - Project manager for the 2.5L 4-cyl engine development
- 1976 - Participated in a Florida test trip of Pontiac drivetrains
- 1978 - Supervisor of the Experimental Powertrain Group
- 1979 - "Eighth Level" Manager of Service Engineering in the Sales Department
- 1980 - Developing a division-wide Value Engineering program
- 1981 - Led Value Engineering seminar to improve quality
- 1982 - Moved to Staff Engineer for Transmission and Axle
- 1983 - Made the official GM Historian for the Pontiac Division
- 1984 - Participated in the press preview for the '84 Pontiac Trans Am and other models at GM Proving Grounds
- 1986 - Ran Pontiac Motorsports and Specialty Vehicles
- 1987 - Moved back to Advanced Vehicle Engineering
- 1997 - Participated in tech seminars during the 25th Anniversary POCI Convention in Denver, Colorado along with Smokey Yunick and John DeLorean.
- 2002 - Retired as a GM Engineering Director
- 2004 - Seminar at GTOAA Nats in Pontiac Michigan. The 40th Anniversary of the GTO coincided with the 25th Anniversary of the GTOAA, and release of new 2004 GTO. John's seminar covered the Pontiac GT-37. During the seminar, John also showed some other little-known facts to the GTO enthusiasts, including the build sheet of the very first Pontiac GTO built.

== Death ==
John was diagnosed with kidney cancer in 1997 and was doing well until November 2007. Typically once someone has been diagnosed with kidney cancer, they only have a 5% chance to live beyond one year. John went through two surgeries and many different experimental drugs over his last few years to be able to live an additional 11 years beyond the odds. On September 30, 2008 the doctor gave him six months, or less, to live and on the morning of November 12, 2008 he died at age 61, just 11 days before his 62nd birthday.
