= Helen Redman =

Helen C. Redman (1935 – 2000) was an American interventional radiologist, noted for being a founding member of the American Association for Women Radiologists (AAWR) in 1981 and the first female president of the Radiological Society of North America (RSNA) from 1994-1995.

== Early life ==
After graduating with a bachelor's degree in biology from the University of Rochester in 1957, Redman completed medical school at Columbia University College of Physicians and Surgeons in New York. She then went on to complete internship and radiology residency at Palo Alto Stanford Hospital, graduating in 1965. At Stanford, she was the first female radiology resident.

== Career ==
Redman was a pioneer in interventional radiology and a supporter of women in medicine. In addition to her classic textbook Gastrointestinal Angiography, she authored 81 original peer-reviewed articles and 23 book chapters. She was the first woman member of the Society of CardioVascular and Interventional Radiology (SCVIR), the first female president and chairman of the Radiological Society of North America (RSNA), and the first female president of the Texas Radiological Society. In 1997, she was named one of "20 Most Influential People in Radiology" by Diagnostic Imaging. In the last months of her life, she was awarded the gold medals of the RSNA, SCVIR, and Texas Radiological Society.
