= Marvin Schindler =

American professor (1932–2003)

Roslyn and Marvin Schindler.

Schindler at Wayne State University.

Schindler speaks as University Senator and enjoys a German festival.

Marvin Samuel Schindler (2 January 1932 – 11 June 2003) was a professor of German and Slavic Studies at Wayne State University in Detroit, Michigan.

== Education ==
Schindler attended Boston Latin School, then earned a bachelor's degree in Germanic Languages and Literatures at the University of Massachusetts in 1953. He earned his master's and doctoral degrees in Germanic Languages and Literatures from the Ohio State University in Columbus, Ohio.

== Career ==
Schindler served as Chair of the Department of Foreign Languages at Northern Illinois University from 1971 to 1974, and as Chair of the Department of Romance and Germanic Languages and Literatures at Wayne State University from 1974 until 1983. His sole authored book was The Sonnets of Andreas Gryphius, a study of the 17th-century German Romantic poet Andreas Gryphius, but he also authored many articles on German and Germanics and was the book review editor of The German Quarterly. In addition, he was co-editor (with Roslyn Abt Schindler, Martin Herman, and Joachim Dyck) of a Festschrift in honor of Professor Diether Haenicke, entitled University Governance and Humanistic Studies, a work in two volumes.

Schindler's leadership of Wayne State's Junior Year in Freiburg and Junior Year in Munich study-abroad programs (he served as director of both from 1975 to 1993) earned him the Bundesverdienstkreuz, Erster Klasse, Germany's highest civilian honor. He twice served as resident director of the Junior Year in Freiburg program, established and run in conjunction with the Albert-Ludwigs-Universitaet, and lived with his family in Freiburg, in the heart of the Black Forest, during the academic years 1983-84 and 1987–88. The Universitaet honored him twice: in 1982, with its silver medallion, and in 1985, with the designation of University Senator.

== Death ==
Schindler died of heart failure at Harper Hospital in Detroit on June 11, 2003, at the age of 71.
