= Sorin Draghici =

Researcher

Sorin Drăghici
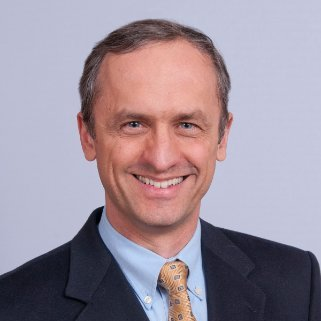
- Citizenship: United States
- Education: University of St Andrews, UK
- Scientific career
- Fields: Computer Science, Bioinformatics, Computational biology, Machine learning, Neural networks, and Biomedical Informatics
- Workplaces: National Science Foundation, Wayne State University

Sorin Drăghici is a Romanian-American computer scientist and a program director in the Division of Information and Intelligent Systems (IIS) of the Directorate for Computer and Information Science and Engineering (CISE) at the National Science Foundation (NSF). Previous positions include: Associate Dean for Entrepreneurship and Innovation of Wayne State University's College of Engineering, the Director of the Bioinformatics and Biostatistics Core at Karmanos Cancer Institute, and the Director of the James and Patricia Anderson Engineering Ventures Institute. Draghici was elected a Fellow of the Institute of Electrical and Electronics Engineers (IEEE) in 2022, for contributions to the analysis of high-throughput genomics and proteomics data. He has also been elected a Fellow of the Asia-Pacific Artificial Intelligence Association (AAIA).

== Career ==
Draghici is a program director in the Directorate for Computer and Information Science and Engineering (CISE) at the National Science Foundation (NSF). At NSF he is responsible for programs in AI and computational biology such as Accelerated Computing-Enabled Scientific Discovery, Molecular Foundations of Biotechnology, Safe Learning-Enabled Systems, Formal Methods in the Field, Global Centers, and others.

He is also a professor in the Department of Computer Science, College of Engineering and Obstetrics and Gynecology in the School of Medicine at Wayne State University. Draghici is also the founder and CEO of AdvaitaBio.

== Research ==
His research area is computational biology and bioinformatics, in particular GO analysis, pathway analysis, meta-analysis, and drug repurposing. His research has been supported by the National Science Foundation, National Institutes of Health and others. He has published over 190 scholarly papers and two technical books: Statistics and Data Analysis for Microarrays Using R and Bioconductor and Data Analysis Tools for DNA Microarrays.

He is an editor for IEEE/ACM Transactions on Computational Biology and Bioinformatics, Current Protocols in Bioinformatics, Journal of Biomedicine and Biotechnology, and a senior editor of the Discoveries Journal.
