= Claude Pruneau =

Canadian-American nuclear physicist

- Born: Claude André Pruneau; November 9, 1960 (age 65); Quebec City, Quebec, Canada
- Known for: Particle correlation measurements in heavy-ion collisions; balance functions; data-analysis methods
- Awards: Fellow of the American Physical Society (2022); Charles H. Gershenson Distinguished Faculty Fellowship (2024)
- Scientific career
- Fields: Nuclear physics, high-energy physics
- Workplaces: Wayne State University; McGill University; Atomic Energy of Canada Limited
- Doctoral advisor: Claude St-Pierre

Claude André Pruneau (born November 9, 1960) is a Canadian-American experimental high-energy nuclear physicist. He is a professor of physics at Wayne State University and the author of several books. He is best known for his work on particle correlation measurements in heavy-ion collisions at the Relativistic Heavy Ion Collider (RHIC) and the Large Hadron Collider (LHC).

== Early life and education ==
Pruneau is a French-Canadian native born in Quebec City. He attended Collège des Jésuites and Cégep de Sainte-Foy before studying at Université Laval, where he earned a B.Sc. in 1982, an M.Sc. in 1983, and a Ph.D. in physics in 1987. His doctoral advisor was Claude St-Pierre.

== Career ==
After his Ph.D., Pruneau was a research associate at the Chalk River Nuclear Laboratories of Atomic Energy of Canada Limited from 1987 to 1989 and then at McGill University from 1989 to 1991. He joined the Wayne State University faculty in 1992 as an assistant professor (research), became assistant professor in 1993, associate professor in 1998, and professor in 2004.

He conducts research on the search for and study of the quark–gluon plasma (QGP) at Brookhaven National Laboratory and CERN. He has been a visiting professor at the Indian Institute of Technology Bombay.

== Research ==
Pruneau's research focuses on the experimental study of the quark–gluon plasma, a state of matter believed to have existed microseconds after the Big Bang. His work has been carried out in large international collaborations, including early experiments at the Brookhaven Alternating Gradient Synchrotron (E814, E877, and E864), the STAR experiment at RHIC, and the ALICE experiment at the LHC.

=== Shear viscosity of the quark–gluon plasma ===
One of his contributions is the extraction of the specific shear viscosity (η/s) of the QGP. In a 2021 paper in The European Physical Journal C, Pruneau and collaborators used the progressive longitudinal broadening of transverse-momentum two-particle correlations measured by STAR and ALICE to estimate this transport coefficient. The analysis indicated that the QGP behaves as a nearly "perfect liquid", with η/s approaching the theoretical Kovtun–Son–Starinets bound. Estimates based on ALICE data showed little centrality dependence at LHC energy, while STAR data at top RHIC energy suggested a possible centrality dependence.

=== Balance functions ===
In 2023 he and collaborators introduced a unified formulation of general balance functions that can accommodate electric charge as well as strange, baryon, charm, and bottom quantum numbers, and that distinguishes acceptance-independent definitions from experimentally bound measurements. Subsequent work formalized multiparticle integral and differential correlation functions and multiparticle balance functions, and applied mixed-species charge and baryon balance functions in PYTHIA studies of proton–proton collisions. A 2025 paper in The European Physical Journal C used balance functions in PYTHIA 8 and EPOS4 simulations to constrain late-stage particle-production mechanisms in proton–proton collisions.

=== Analysis methods and software ===
Pruneau developed an identity method for measurements of multiplicity moments and fluctuation observables when particle identification is incomplete. Within the STAR collaboration he was part of a team that created the track-reconstruction software used to convert raw detector data into kinematic quantities for physics analysis.

== Books ==
Pruneau is the author of the graduate textbook Data Analysis Techniques for Physical Scientists (Cambridge University Press, 2017), a treatment of probability, statistics, correlation measurements, unfolding, and Monte Carlo methods aimed at experimental physical scientists. The book received reviews in Contemporary Physics, Physics Today, and Computing Reviews.

He also co-authored Wayne State special editions of the introductory textbook Foundations of Astronomy (Cengage), with Michael A. Seeds and Dana Backman. The custom editions, used in Wayne State's AST 2010 course, appeared in 2013, 2014, and 2016 and incorporated additional chapters prepared for a planned companion text, Exploring Astronomy.

== Awards and honors ==
- Charles H. Gershenson Distinguished Faculty Fellowship, Wayne State University (2024)
- Fellow of the American Physical Society (2022), "For outstanding contributions to the field of heavy ion collisions, especially in correlations and fluctuations, both experimental measurements and techniques development, broad contributions to undergraduate education, and the publication of two books."
- Wayne State University Board of Governors Faculty Recognition Award (2019), recognizing Data Analysis Techniques for Physical Scientists
- Wayne State University President's Award for Excellence in Teaching (2006)
- Wayne State University College of Science Teaching Award (2003)

== Selected publications ==
=== Books ===
- Pruneau, Claude A. (2017). Data Analysis Techniques for Physical Scientists. Cambridge University Press. ISBN 978-1-108-41678-8.
- Seeds, Michael A.; Backman, Dana; Pruneau, Claude. Foundations of Astronomy (Wayne State special editions). Cengage, 2013, 2014, 2016.

=== Selected papers ===
- Gonzalez, V.; Basu, S.; Marin, A.; Pan, J.; Ladron de Guevara, P.; Pruneau, C. A. (2021). "Extraction of the specific shear viscosity of quark-gluon plasma from two-particle transverse momentum correlations". The European Physical Journal C. 81 (5) 465. doi:10.1140/epjc/s10052-021-09260-z. arXiv:2012.10542.
- Pruneau, C.; Gonzalez, V.; Hanley, B.; Marin, A.; Basu, S. (2023). "Accounting for nonvanishing net-charge with unified balance functions". Physical Review C. 107 (1) 014902. doi:10.1103/PhysRevC.107.014902.
- Pruneau, C.; Gonzalez, V.; Marin, A.; Basu, S. (2024). "Multiparticle integral and differential correlation functions". Physical Review C. 109 (4) 044904. doi:10.1103/PhysRevC.109.044904.
- Manea, A.; Pruneau, C.; et al. (2025). "Investigating late-stage particle production in pp collisions with balance functions". The European Physical Journal C. 85 323. doi:10.1140/epjc/s10052-025-14049-5. arXiv:2411.11207.
- Pruneau, C. A. (2017). "Identity method reexamined". Physical Review C. 96 (5) 054902. doi:10.1103/PhysRevC.96.054902. arXiv:1706.01333.
- Pruneau, C.; Gavin, S.; Voloshin, S. (2002). "Methods for the study of particle production fluctuations". Physical Review C. 66 (4) 044904. doi:10.1103/PhysRevC.66.044904. arXiv:nucl-ex/0204011.
