= Wayne State University Computer Science Department =

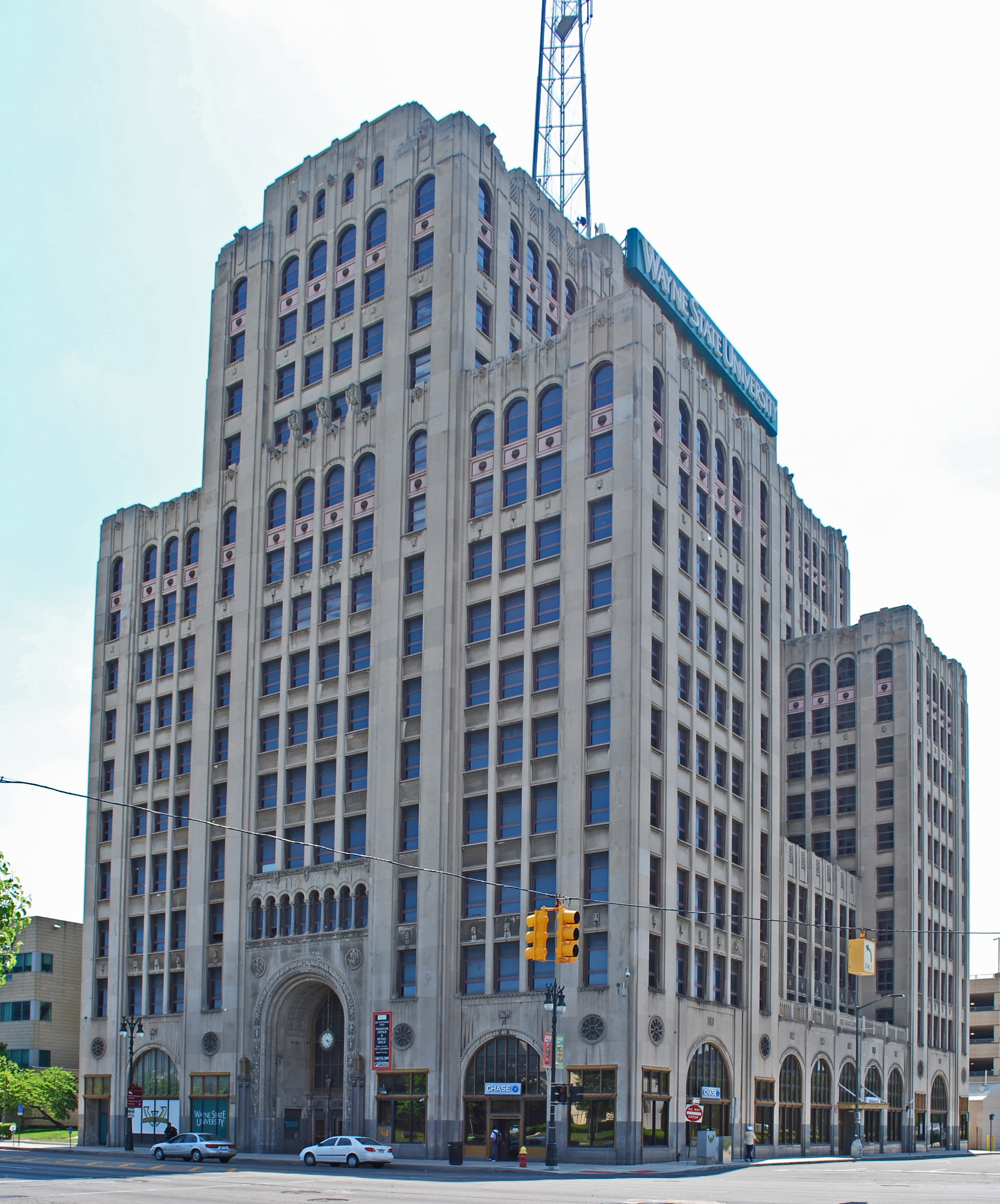

General information
- Location: Maccabees Building, Detroit, MI, USA

Website
- WSU CS Department

Wayne State University Department of Computer Science is part of the College of Engineering. The department offers core academic strength in many areas including artificial intelligence, bioinformatics, data mining and machine learning, networking, databases, distributed and parallel computing, computer security, computer graphics and visualizations, and software engineering. Undergraduate (Bachelor of Science and Bachelor of Arts) and graduate degrees (Master of Science and PhD) in Computer Science, as well as an undergraduate degree in Information Systems Technology and a certificate in Scientific Computing are offered in the department. In addition, graduate students have the opportunity to complete their Ph.D. work in Computer Science with a concentration in Bioinformatics and Computational Biology.

The undergraduate curriculum includes a high degree of hands-on experience with real-world systems and an increased focus on personal attention, as well as an emphasis on undergraduate participation in research projects. Undergraduate students have the opportunity to choose among a variety of concentrations including Software Engineering, Databases, Web Technology and Computer Gaming. Study abroad opportunities are available with European schools including the École Polytechnique de l'Université de Nantes, France.

The Department of Computer Science is a major focus for interdisciplinary activities within the university, with annual R&D expenditures between $2 and $3 million. The department's commitment to community service includes a new joint degree program with Focus: HOPE, as well as offering summer computer camps for middle and high school students.

It is located in the Maccabees Building, in Detroit
