= Hybrid III =

Crash test dummy

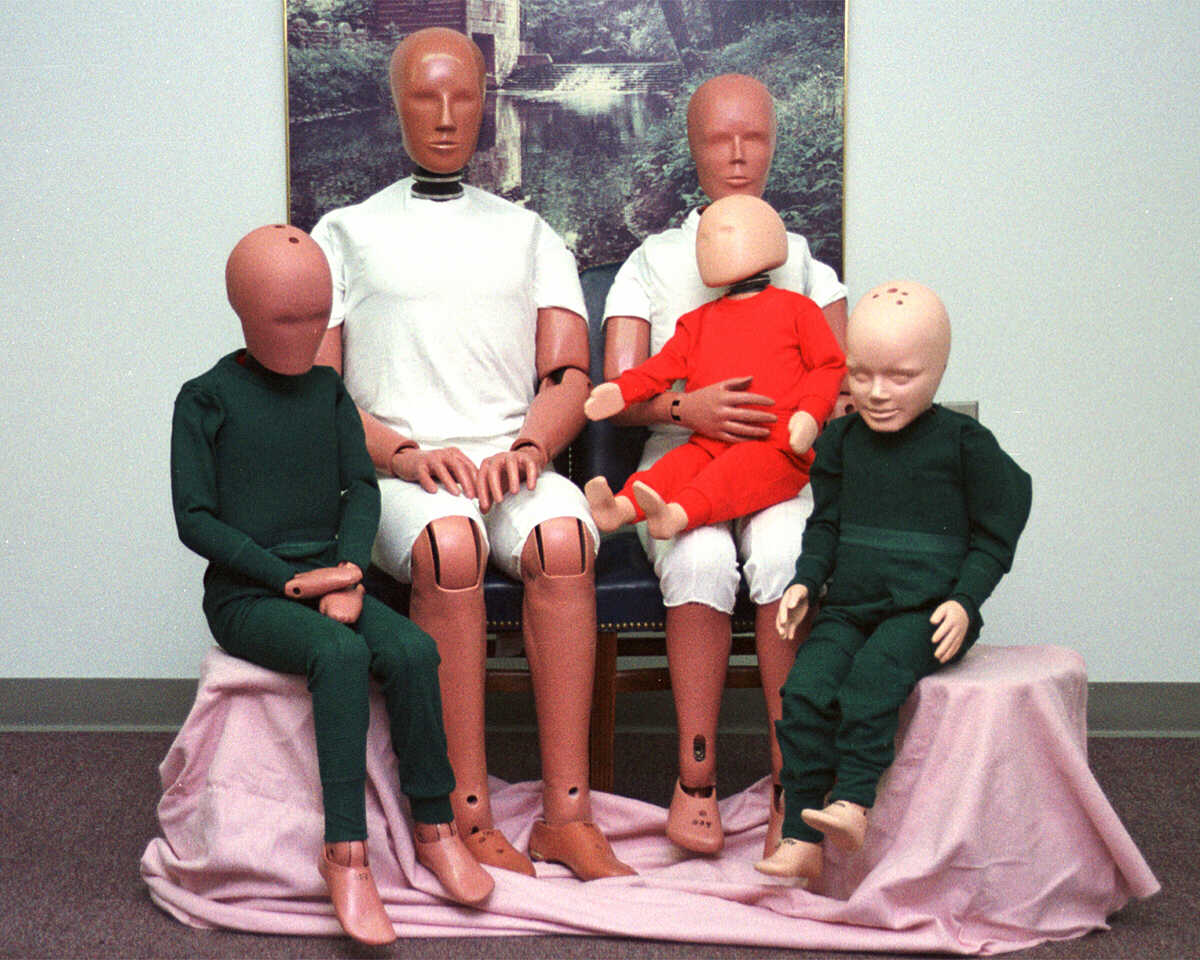
The original 50th percentile male Hybrid III's family expanded to include a 95th percentile male, 5th percentile female which is described as 'female' but is still based on the male body shape, and three-year-old and six-year-old child dummies.

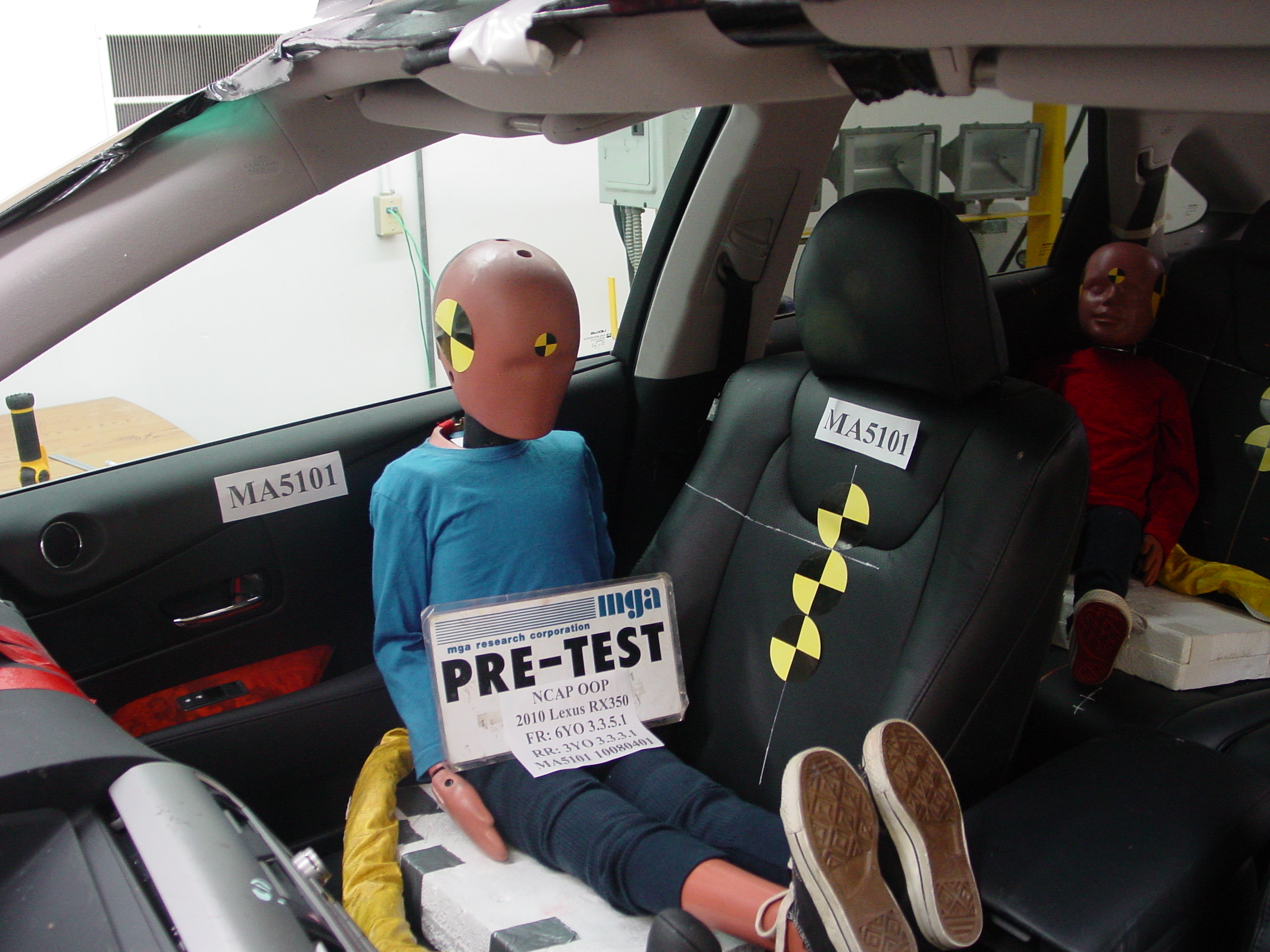
6 year-old and 3 year-old Hybrid III dummies sitting in a Lexus RX350 prior to an static side airbag deployment test.

The Hybrid III is the standard crash test dummy for frontal crash tests as of the beginning of the 21st century. It was initially only a 50th percentile male (equal in height and weight to the average North American male at the time of its development).

Hybrid III, the 50th percentile male dummy which made its first appearance in 1976, is the familiar crash test dummy. If he could stand upright, he would be 5' 9" tall and would have a mass of approximately 78 kg (172 lb). He occupies the driver's seat in all the Insurance Institute for Highway Safety (IIHS) 65 km/h (40 mph) offset frontal crash tests.

Hybrid III has a "big brother" model, the 95th percentile Hybrid III, at 188 cm (6 ft 2 in) and 100 kg (220 lb). The 'female' Hybrid III is a 5th percentile dummy that is based on the same male body shape as the others, at 152 cm (4.99 ft) tall and 50 kg (110 lb). The two Hybrid III child dummies represent a 21 kg (46 lb) six-year-old and a 15 kg (33 lb) three-year-old. The child models are recent additions to the crash test dummy family; because so little hard data are available on the effects of accidents on children, and such data are very difficult to obtain, these models are based in large part on estimates and approximations.
