= Society of Interventional Radiology =

- Abbreviation: SIR
- Established: 1973
- Headquarters: Fairfax, Virginia, U.S.
- President: Alda L. Tam, MD, MBA, FSIR
- Website: https://www.sirweb.org/
- Formerly called: Society of CardioVascular and Interventional Radiology

The Society of Interventional Radiology (SIR) is an American national organization of physicians, scientists and allied health professionals dedicated to improving public health through the use of minimally invasive, image-guided therapeutic interventions for disease management.

== History ==
SIR was founded in 1973 as the Society of Cardiovascular Radiology by an active group in the field who wanted to further develop interventional aspects of radiology. It changed its name to the Society of CardioVascular and Interventional Radiology in 1983. In April 2002, the name was changed to Society of Interventional Radiology in order to emphasise the expanding role of interventional radiology that is no longer limited to the cardiovascular system. The society comprises about 8,000 members (March 2023): including practicing physicians, trainees, scientists and clinical associates, such as physician assistants, nurse practitioners, radiologic technologists and paramedical professionals. Katharine L. Krol served as the Society's first female president. The Journal of Vascular and Interventional Radiology (JVIR) is the Society's official journal.

== Political action committee ==
The Society of Interventional Radiology Political Action Committee (SIRPAC) is a nonpartisan political organization that supports political candidates and elected officials who are dedicated to advancing the interests of interventional radiologists and the patients they serve. SIRPAC is funded through donations from SIR members, and uses these funds to support political candidates who have demonstrated a commitment to policies that promote patient access to interventional radiology services and advance the specialty.

During the 2022 election cycle, SIRPAC donated $135,682 to candidates (65.65% to Democrats, 34.35% to Republicans) and raised more than $180,000 from members.

== See also ==
- Angiography
- Peripheral Artery Disease
- Prostate Artery Embolization
- Uterine artery embolization
