= Gold Coast =

Gold Coast may refer to:

== Places ==
=== Africa ===
- Gold Coast (region), in West Africa, made up of the following colonies, before being established as the independent nation of Ghana:
  - Portuguese Gold Coast (Portuguese, 1482–1642)
  - Dutch Gold Coast (Dutch, 1598–1872)
  - Swedish Gold Coast (Swedes, 1650–1658; 1660–1663)
  - Danish Gold Coast (Denmark-Norway, 1658–1850)
  - Brandenburger Gold Coast and Prussian Gold Coast (Germans, 1682–1721)
  - Gold Coast (British colony) (British, 1821–1957)

=== Asia ===
- Hong Kong Gold Coast, a private housing estate in Hong Kong

=== Australia ===
- Gold Coast, Queensland, a city in the state of Queensland
  - City of Gold Coast, a local government area spanning the Gold Coast and surrounding areas
  - Gold Coast Parklands, a greyhound and harness racing complex in Queensland
  - Gold Coast Regional Botanic Gardens, in Benowa, Gold Coast

=== Europe ===
- Costa Daurada, an area on the coast of Catalonia, Spain
- Goldcoast (Switzerland), the lower eastern shore of the Lake of Zürich
- "Gold Coast", a popular name for the harbour street and amusement mile "Schiffbrücke" in Flensburg, Germany
- Côte-d'Or, a department of France

=== North America ===
- Gold Coast, California, a nickname for Ventura, California, US
- Gold Coast, Orange County, a region also called Orange Coast in California, US
- Gold Coast (Connecticut), the southern portion of Fairfield County, Connecticut, US
- Gold Coast (New Jersey), US
- Gold Coast (Washington), US
- Gold Coast, Long Island, a nickname for the North Shore, New York, US
- Gold Coast Historic District (Chicago), Illinois, US
- Gold Coast Historic District (Omaha, Nebraska), US
  - Old Gold Coast, Omaha, Nebraska, US
- Lakewood Gold Coast, Ohio, US
- The Miami metropolitan area, nicknamed Florida's Gold Coast

=== South America ===
- Costa de Oro, a group of resort towns and beaches in Uruguay
- Ocumare de la Costa de Oro Municipality, a municipality in Venezuela

== Art, entertainment, and media ==
=== Broadcasting ===
- Gold Coast Broadcasting, a radio broadcasting company in California, US

=== Literature ===
- Gold Coast (novel), 1980, by Elmore Leonard
- The Gold Coast (Robinson novel), 1988, by Kim Stanley Robinson
- The Gold Coast (DeMille novel), 1990, by Nelson DeMille

=== Music ===
- Gold Coast (album), 1977, by John Coltrane and Wilbur Harden

=== Periodicals ===
- Gold Coast (magazine), Fort Lauderdale, Florida, US
- Gold Coast Bulletin, the principal daily newspaper of Australia's Gold Coast City
- Gold Coast Mail, a newspaper published in Queensland, Australia

== Sports ==
=== Australia ===
- Gold Coast Blaze, a former basketball team in the National Basketball League (NBL)
- Gold Coast Blue Tongues, a former semi-professional ice hockey team in the Australian Ice Hockey League
- Gold Coast Breakers, a rugby union club, based at Bond University, Gold Coast, Queensland
- Gold Coast Chargers, a former rugby league club in New South Wales
- Gold Coast Classic (tennis), a precursor to the Brisbane International tournament, Queensland
- Gold Coast Clippers, a foundation team in the now-defunct Australian Baseball League
- Gold Coast Cougars, a former Australian baseball team
- Gold Coast Hawks, a team in the Bowls Premier League in Australia and New Zealand
- Gold Coast Marathon, a race on the Gold Coast, Queensland
- Gold Coast Rollers (NBL), a former basketball team in the National Basketball League (NBL)
- Gold Coast Rollers (QBL), a basketball team in the Queensland Basketball League (QBL)
- Gold Coast Suns, an AFL team
- Gold Coast Titans, a rugby league football club the National Rugby League (NRL)
- Gold Coast United FC, an A-League football team based on the Gold Coast
- Gold Coast Vikings, a rugby league team that competed in the Queensland State League and the Queensland Cup competitions
- Tennis Gold Coast, the governing body for the sport of tennis in the Gold Coast, Queensland

=== Sports in other places ===
- Golden Coast Conference, a US college sports conference
- Gold Coast Suns (baseball), a team in the Senior Professional Baseball Association, Florida, US

== Structures ==
- Gold Coast Hospital, a former hospital in the Gold Coast, Queensland, Australia
- Gold Coast Hotel and Casino, a hotel and casino in Las Vegas, Nevada, US
- Gold Coast (bar), a former leather bar for gay men in Chicago, Illinois
- Gold Coast Stadium (disambiguation)

== Transportation ==
- Gold Coast Airport, an Australian domestic and international airport on the Gold Coast
- Gold Coast Highway, an Australian highway
- Gold Coast Oceanway, a shared use pedestrian and cyclist pathway between New South Wales and Queensland, Australia
- Gold Coast railway line, connects Brisbane with the Queensland Gold Coast in Australia
- Gold Coast Seaway, the main shipping channel for the Gold Coast Broadwater in Australia
- Gold Coast (train), a passenger train in the US
- Gold Coast Transit, a bus operator in California, US

== Vessels ==
- HMS Gold Coast, a name held briefly by the British frigate HMS Labuan

== See also ==
- Gold Coast ackey, a currency issued for the Gold Coast by the British between 1796 and 1818
- Gold Coast Historic District (disambiguation)
- Golden Coast (disambiguation)
- Côte d'Or (disambiguation)
- Gould Coast, Antarctica
