= Robert Provenzano =

American physician and academic

Dr. Robert Provenzano

Robert Provenzano is an American nephrologist. He is also an Associate Clinical Professor of Medicine at Wayne State University School of Medicine.

== Affiliations ==
Robert works with several professional societies and advisory boards. He is past-President of the Renal Physicians Association, immediate past-Chair of the Board of Trustees for the National Kidney Foundation of Michigan, and an active member of the American Society of Nephrology and the American Society of Transplantation, and a fellow of the American College of Physicians.

Provenzano is also a member of the Michigan State Medical Society, Wayne County Medical Society, American Medical Association, International Society of Nephrology, Transplant Society of Michigan, American Society of Apheresis, International Society of Peritoneoscopists, and International Society of Blood Purification.

== Education ==
He received a Bachelor of Arts degree from Western Michigan University and a Doctor of Medicine degree from Wayne State University School of Medicine. He completed his internship and residency at St John Hospital and Medical Center. His nephrology fellowship was completed at Henry Ford Hospital in Detroit, MI.

== Awards ==
- 2008 - Voted "Top Doc" Detroit Hour Magazine
- 2006 - Voted "Top Doc" Detroit Hour Magazine
- 2004 - American Association of Kidney Patients “Visionary Award”
- 2004 - Voted "Top Doc" Hour Detroit Magazine
- 2003 - Voted “Top Doc” Consumer's Checkbook Magazine
- 1997 - NKF of Michigan Distinguished Service Award
- 1995 - Elected as member of Alpha Omega Alpha Honor Medical Society
- 1995 - Voted "Top Doc" Detroit Monthly Magazine
- 1993 - Voted "Top Doc" Detroit Monthly Magazine
- 1991 - Certificate of Appreciation, Detroit Kiwanis Club
- 1990 - Instructor of the Year, Department of Medicine, St. John Hospital & Medical Center

== Interests ==
His research interests include anemia management in chronic kidney disease (CKD), applying quality measures to CKD care, medical finance, application of membrane technology to plasmapheresis, and low-dose immunosuppression in kidney transplantation.

Provenzano has lectured and served on many speakers’ bureaus about the topics of anemia and CKD and medical finance. Through his work in developing a CKD tool kit for physicians, he has helped to ensure doctors and patients have tools to make important health decisions.

== Clinical practice ==
Provenzano is the former chief operating officer (COO) of St. Clair Specialty Physicians (SCSP) in Detroit, MI.

SCSP provides comprehensive inpatient and outpatient care for kidney patients and is nationally recognized as a leading nephrology practice. SCSP was founded in 1977 with the addition of Provenzano to the practice of Joseph M. Beals. The company now employs over 30 physicians with over 70 support staff. In spite of this growth, SCSP insists its dedication to patient service has remained their primary focus.

== Licensure and board certification ==
- 1988 - Diplomate in the Subspecialty of Nephrology
- 1986 - State of Michigan, Permanent License #47354
- 1986 - Diplomate of the Board of Internal Medicine
- 1983 - Certified, National Board of Medical Examiners (USMLE)

== Program development ==
- 2000 - Developed and implemented Early Renal Insufficiency Clinic (ERIC), St. John Hospital and Medical Center
- 1996 - Initiated Urea Kinetic modeling program to CAPD patients to assess adequacy of dialysis.
- 1995 - Instrumental in initiating process creating an Independent Practice Association (IPA) linking dialysis systems of SJH, Wayne State University and Mt. Clemens General Hospital & other private nephrology groups (~1200 patients).
- 1992 - Developing QA/CQI programs - Department of Nephrology.
- 1992 - Developed Plasmapheresis Program based on Membrane technology rather than centrifugation, SJH & MC.
- 1990 - Developed Kidney & Pancreas Transplant Program.
- 1990 - Developed and staffed Nephrology Fellowship Program.
- 1988 - Developed Instructional Program for Percutaneous Placement of Tenckhoff Dialysis Catheters.
- 1988 - Participated in organization of St. John Dialysis Center expansion from two unit (~75 patient base) to five unit (~650 patient base).
- 1988 - Participated in expansion of acute dialysis program, currently providing services to nine regional hospitals.
- 1988 - Initiated ICU Continuous Renal Replacement Therapy (CRRT) Program SJH & MC.
- 1988 - Initiated Urea Kinetic Modeling program to hemodialysis patients to assess adequacy of dialysis.
- 1988 - Developed Nephrology teaching program (resident), St. John Hospital and Medical Center
- 1987 - Developed Continuous Dialytic Therapy Program during Fellowship, Henry Ford Hospital.

== Advisory boards ==
- 2005 - Scientific Advisory Board; Advanced Magnetics, Inc.
- 2004 - External Advisory Committee; Comprehensive Center for Health Disparities -Chronic Kidney Disease, National Institutes of Health Grant Number 1 U54 RR019234
- 2002 - Pancreas Ad Hoc Advisory Committee-Certificate of Need Commission, State of Michigan Department of Community Health
- 2001 - Chronic Kidney Disease Leadership Advisory Board – Ortho Biotech
- 2001 - Scientific Advisory Board Renal Disease Management, Inc.
- 2000 - Chronic Renal Insufficiency and Anemia Regional Board - Baxter International
- 2000 - Chronic Kidney Disease - National Advisory Board - Amgen

== Hospital appointments ==
- 2001 - Consulting Staff, St. John North Shores Hospital
- 1997 - Consulting Staff, Vencor Hospital
- 1997 - Consulting Staff, Cottage Hospital
- 1995-98 - Member, Hospital Quality Assurance Committee, St. John Hospital & Medical Center
- 1995-96 - Vice Chief, Department of Internal Medicine, St. John Hospital & Medical Center
- 1995–2001 - Chair, Medicine Quality Assurance Committee, St. John Hospital & Medical Center
- 1995-96 - Vice Chief, Department of Internal Medicine, St. John Hospital & Medical Center
- 1994 - Director, Nephrology Fellowship Program, St. John Hospital and Medical Center
- 1994 - Medical Director, FMC Conner Hemodialysis Unit, Detroit, MI
- 1993-95 - Executive Committee of the Medical Staff, St. John Hospital & Medical Center
- 1993 - Vice Chief, Section of Nephrology, Department of Internal Medicine, St. John Hospital and Medical Center
- 1992 - Senior Active Staff, St. John Hospital & Medical Center
- 1992 - Co-director, Plasmapheresis Program, St. John Hospital & Medical Center
- 1990 - Medical Director, Transplantation Services, St. John Hospital & Medical Center
- 1990 - Medical Director, Acute Dialysis Programs, St. John Hospital & Medical Center
- 1989 - Consulting Staff, Mount Clemens General Hospital
- 1988-96 - Member, Investigational Review Board St. John Hospital & Medical Center
- 1988-89 - Junior Active Staff, St. John Hospital & Medical Center
- 1988 - Senior Active Staff, Bon Secours Hospital
- 1988 - Consulting Staff, St. Joseph's Hospital (East & West)
- 1988 - Consulting Staff, Macomb Center Hospital
- 1988-94 - Medical Director, Hemodialysis Unit Warren, MI
- 1988 - Director, Kidney Stone Clinic, St. John Hospital & Medical Center

== Society appointments ==
- 2005 -, Renal Physicians Association, Washington, D.C.
- 2004- - Chair, Board of Trustees, National Kidney Foundation of Michigan
- 2003–2005 - President-Elect Renal Physicians Association, Washington, D.C.
- 2003–2004 - 1st Chair Board of Trustees-National Kidney Foundation of Michigan
- 2002–2003 - 2nd Vice-Chair Board of Trustees-National Kidney Foundation of Michigan
- 2001 - Ex-Officio Member, Transplant Society of Michigan
- 2001 - Chair of Finance Subcommittee, Great Lakes Transplantation Association
- 2001–2003 - Treasurer/Secretary, Renal Physicians Association, Washington, D.C.
- 2001–2003 - Chair of Finance Subcommittee (Renal Physicians Association)
- 2001–2003 - President, Great Lakes Transplantation Association
- 2001–2003 - Chair, Scientific Advisory Board, National Kidney Foundation of Michigan
- 2001–2005 - Member, Medical Review Board - FORUM of End Stage Renal Disease Networks
- 1999 - Board of Directors, Renal Physicians Association, Washington, D.C.
- 1998–2001 - President, Renal Network of the Upper Midwest, Inc., St. Paul, Minnesota
- 1998–2005 - Member, FORUM of End Stage Renal Disease Networks Quality Improvement Committee
- 1997–2000 - Public Policy Committee, National Kidney Foundation of Michigan
- 1997–2000 - Advisory Development Committee, National Kidney Foundation of Michigan
- 1996–1998 - Vice President, Renal Network of the Upper Midwest, Inc. (HFCA-End Stage Renal Disease Network 11)
- 1996 - President, Michigan Renal Physicians Association
- 1996 - Member, Michigan State Renal Task Force
- 1995–2002 - National Kidney Foundation, Scientific Advisory Board Executive Committee
- 1994–1995 - Member, Advisory Board, Great Lakes Transplantation Association
- 1994–1995 - Member, Advisory Board, Transplant Society of Michigan

== Consulting appointments ==
- 2007 - CHF Solutions
- 2005 - Centocor Research & Development, Inc (CNTO)
- 2003 - C.R. BARD
- 2003 - Advanced Magnetics, Inc.
- 2003 - Hoffmann–La Roche
- 2002 - RMS Lifeline Inc. (Baxter)
- 2002 - Amgen
- 2000 - Ortho-Biotech

== Publications ==
Provenzano has published numerous articles and clinical studies:

- Anemia Management in Chronic Kidney Disease.” Current Essentials of Diagnosis & Treatment in Nephrology and Hypertension, Provenzano, R., Nissenson, A., Berns, J., Lerma, E. Editors, Chap. pp. McGraw Hill Publishers, April 2007
- Role of Aldosterone in Left Ventricular Hypertrophy among African-American Patients with End-Stage Renal Disease on Hemodialysis, Steigerwalt, S., Zafar, A., Mesiha, N., Gardin, J., Provenzano, R., Role of Aldosterone in Left Ventricular Hypertrophy among African-American Patients with End-Stage Renal Disease on Hemodialysis, American Journal of Nephrology 2007; 27:159-163.
- Extended Epoetin Alfa Dosing as Maintenance Treatment for the Anemia of Chronic Kidney Disease, Provenzano, R., Bhaduri, S., Singh, A., Extended Epoetin Alfa Dosing as Maintenance Treatment for the Anemia of Chronic Kidney Disease: The PROMPT Study, Clinical Nephrology, Vol. 64, No. 2, pp. 113–123, August 2005.
- A Single Center Experience in the Use of Polyurethaneurea Arteriovenous Grafts, Jefic, D., Reddy, P., Flynn, L., Provenzano, R., A Single Center Experience in the Use of Polyurethaneurea Arteriovenous Grafts, Nephrology News and Issues, Vol. 19, No. 8, pp. 44–47, July 2005.
- Core Curriculum in Nephrology: Economics of Clinical Nephrology Practice, Provenzano, R., Nissenson, A., Core Curriculum in Nephrology: Economics of Clinical Nephrology Practice, American Journal of Kidney Diseases, Vol. 44, No. 1, pp. 168–178, July 2004.
- Once-Weekly Epoetin Alfa for Treating the Anemia of Chronic Kidney Disease, Provenzano, R., Garcia-Mayol, L., Suchinda, P., Von Hartitzsch, B., Woollen, S.B., Zabaneh, R., Fink, J.C. and the POWER Study Group, Clinical Nephrology, Vol. 61, No 6, pp. 392–405, June 2004.
- Early Detection of Prostate Cancer in the ESRD Population, Khairullah, Q.T., Pamatmat, S.D., Chatha, M., Provenzano, R., Telang, D., Temple, M., Early Detection of Prostate Cancer in the ESRD Population, Clinical Nephrology, Vol. 61, No. 5, May 2004.
- The Value of Integrating a Vascular Surgeon into a Nephrology Practice, Provenzano, R., Flynn, L., The Value of Integrating a Vascular Surgeon into a Nephrology Practice, Nephrology News & Issues, Vol. 17, No. 8, pp. 49–53, July 2003.
- Managed Care Guidelines for Management of Chronic Kidney Disease, Provenzano, R, et al. Managed Care Guidelines for Management of Chronic Kidney Disease, Suppl. Managed Care, Vol. 12, No. 3, March 2003.
- The Nephrology Nurse’s Role in Improved Care of Patients with Chronic Kidney Disease, Provenzano, R., Compton, A., Johnson, CA., The Nephrology Nurse's Role in Improved Care of Patients with Chronic Kidney Disease, Nephrology Nursing Journal, Vol. 29, No. 4, pp. 331–336, (August) 2002.
- Comparison of Vancomycin Versus Cefazolin as Initial Therapy for Peritonitis in Peritoneal Dialysis Patients, Khairullah, Q., Provenzano, R., Ahmed, A., Tayeb, T., Balakrisnan, B., Comparison of Vancomycin Versus Cefazolin as Initial Therapy for Peritonitis in Peritoneal Dialysis Patients, In press, Perit Dial Int 2002; 22:339-344.
- Frequency of HB Testing and Anemia Diagnosis in Patients with Chronic Kidney Disease During Pre and Postdialysis Period., Wish, J., Provenzano, R., Shulman, K., Law, A, Nassar, G., Frequency of HB Testing and Anemia Diagnosis in Patients with Chronic Kidney Disease During Pre and Postdialysis Period. National Kidney Foundation Clinical Meetings, Orlando, FL, 2007.
- C.E.R.A. Administered at Extended Dosing Intervals Corrects Anemia and Maintains Stable Hemoglobin Levels in Patients with Chronic Kidney Disease (CKD) not on Dialysis, Provenzano, R., Schmidt, R., Dalton, C., Beswick, R., Nassar, G., C.E.R.A. Administered at Extended Dosing Intervals Corrects Anemia and Maintains Stable Hemoglobin Levels in Patients with Chronic Kidney Disease (CKD) not on Dialysis. ESRD Forum Meeting, Baltimore, MD, 2007.
- Use of Aldosterone Antagonists (AA) Are Associated with Achieved Blood Pressure (BP) Control in Chronic Kidney Disease (CKD), Topf, J., Steigerwalt, S., Provenzano, R., Use of Aldosterone Antagonists (AA) Are Associated with Achieved Blood Pressure (BP) Control in Chronic Kidney Disease (CKD). American Society of Nephrology 39th Annual Meeting, San Diego, CA, 2006.
- CKD (Chronic Kidney Disease) Clinics Improve Anemia, Lipids and Arrest the Decline of GFR, Topf, J., Provenzano, R., Abud, G., CKD (Chronic Kidney Disease) Clinics Improve Anemia, Lipids and Arrest the Decline of GFR, American Society of Nephrology 39th Annual Meeting, San Diego, CA, 2006.
- A Double-Blind, Placebo-Controlled, Randomized Phase III Study of the Safety of Ferumoxytol – A New Intravenous Iron Replacement Therapy, Singh, A., Besarab, A. Bolton, W., Pereira, B, Provenzano, R., Rao, M., Spinowitz, B., A Double-Blind, Placebo-Controlled, Randomized Phase III Study of the Safety of Ferumoxytol – A New Intravenous Iron Replacement Therapy, American Society of Nephrology 39th Annual Meeting, San Diego, CA, 2006.
- Parenteral Iron Therapy with Ferumoxytol in Hemodialysis: A Phase III Study, Besarab, A., Bolton, W., Pereira, B., Provenzano, R., Singh, A., Rao, and Spinowitz, B. Parenteral Iron Therapy with Ferumoxytol in Hemodialysis: A Phase III Study, American Society of Nephrology 39th Annual Meeting, San Diego, CA, 2006.
- Blood Pressure (BP) Control by Race, Gender and Chronic Kidney Disease (CKD) Stage in a CKD Clinic, Topf, J., Steigerwalt, S., Provenzano, R., Blood Pressure (BP) Control by Race, Gender and Chronic Kidney Disease (CKD) Stage in a CKD Clinic, American Society of Hypertension 21st Annual Scientific Meeting, New York, NY, 2006.
- Subcutaneous (SC) CERA (Continuous Erythropoietin Receptor Activator) Administered Once Every 2 Weeks Effectively Corrects Anemia in Patients with Chronic Kidney Disease (CKD) on Dialysis and Not on Dialysis, Provenzano, R., Dougherty, F., Subcutaneous (SC) CERA (Continuous Erythropoietin Receptor Activator) Administered Once Every 2 Weeks Effectively Corrects Anemia in Patients with Chronic Kidney Disease (CKD) on Dialysis and Not on Dialysis. National Kidney Foundation Clinical Meetings, Chicago, IL, 2006.
- C-Reactive Protein Levels Do Not Predict Acute Rejection in Kidney Transplant Recipients, Butcher, D., El-Ghoroury, M., Bellovich, K., Provenzano, R., C-Reactive Protein Levels Do Not Predict Acute Rejection in Kidney Transplant Recipients, National Kidney Foundation Spring Clinical Meeting, Chicago, IL, 2006.
- A Single Center Experience in the Use of Polyurethane (Vectraâ) Arteriovenous Grafts, Jefic, D., Flynn, L., Provenzano, R., A Single Center Experience in the Use of Polyurethane (Vectraâ) Arteriovenous Grafts. American Society of Nephrology, Philadelphia, PA, 2005.
- Prevalence and Treatment of Anemia in Patients with Hypertension and Chronic Kidney Disease, McClellan, W., Provenzano, R., Prevalence and Treatment of Anemia in Patients with Hypertension and Chronic Kidney Disease. Heart Failure Society of America, 9th Annual Scientific Meeting, Boca Raton, FL, 2005.
- Impact of Avoiding Loading Dose of Sirolimus on Wound Complication After Kidney Transplant. A Single Center Experience, Ayran, M., Jabri, M., El-Ghoroury, M., Oh, H., Provenzano, R., Impact of Avoiding Loading Dose of Sirolimus on Wound Complication After Kidney Transplant. A Single Center Experience. American Transplant Congress, Seattle, WA, 2005.
- Safety and Efficacy of Sirolimus, Low Dose Tacrolimus and Early Steroid Withdrawal in Patients with Cadaveric Renal Allographs: A Comparative Study, Nagrecha, N., El-Ghoroury, M., Provenzano, R., Safety and Efficacy of Sirolimus, Low Dose Tacrolimus and Early Steroid Withdrawal in Patients with Cadaveric Renal Allographs: A Comparative Study. American Society of Nephrology Meeting, St. Louis, MO, 2004.
- The Role of Home Blood Pressure Monitoring (HBPM) in the Control of Hypertension in Renal Transplant Recipients, Awosika, B., Makos, G., Steigerwalt, S., El-Ghoroury, M., Provenzano, R., The Role of Home Blood Pressure Monitoring (HBPM) in the Control of Hypertension in Renal Transplant Recipients. American Society of Transplantation, Boston, MA, 2004.
- Extended Dosing of Procrito (Epoetin Alfa) Effectively Treats Anemia and Improves Quality of Life in Patients with Diabetes and CKD, Provenzano, R., Extended Dosing of Procrito (Epoetin Alfa) Effectively Treats Anemia and Improves Quality of Life in Patients with Diabetes and CKD. National Kidney Foundation Clinical Meetings, Chicago, IL, 2004.
- Long Term AV Graft Survival of Polyurethane (Vectra) Grafts, Rankin, S., Provenzano, R., Flynn, L., Long Term AV Graft Survival of Polyurethane (Vectra) Grafts. American Society of Nephrology, San Diego, CA, 2003.
- Spironolactone Use Does Not Increase Serum Potassium in End Stage Renal Disease Patients on Hemodialysis., Reddy, P., Steigerwalt, S., Brar, B., Provenzano, R., Spironolactone Use Does Not Increase Serum Potassium in End Stage Renal Disease Patients on Hemodialysis. American Society of Nephrology, San Diego, CA, 2003.
- Safety and Efficacy of Calcineurin and Steroid Avoidance in Living Donor Renal Allografts, Reddy, P., Brar, B., El-Ghoroury, M., Provenzano, R., Oh, H., Fasola, C., Safety and Efficacy of Calcineurin and Steroid Avoidance in Living Donor Renal Allografts. American Society of Nephrology, San Diego, CA, 2003.
- Adequacy of Inpatient Versus Outpatient Hemodialysis in End Stage Renal Disease Patients: A Comparative Study., Brar, B., Tayeb., J., Reddy, P., Goushaw, P., Provenzano, R., Adequacy of Inpatient Versus Outpatient Hemodialysis in End Stage Renal Disease Patients: A Comparative Study. American Society of Nephrology, San Diego, CA, 2003.
- Prospective, Randomized Evaluation of Extended Epoetin Alfa Dosing for Treatment of Anemia of Chronic Kidney Disease (CKD): PROMPT Interim Analysis, Provenzano, R., Bhaduri, S., Tang, K.L., Klausner, M., Singh, A., Prospective, Randomized Evaluation of Extended Epoetin Alfa Dosing for Treatment of Anemia of Chronic Kidney Disease (CKD): PROMPT Interim Analysis. American Society of Nephrology, San Diego, CA, 2003.
- Aldosterone Is Involved in Left Ventricular Hypertrophy in African American Males with End Stage Renal Disease Treated with Hemodialysis, Steigerwalt, S., Mesiha, N., Zafar, A., Gardin, J., Provenzano, R., Aldosterone Is Involved in Left Ventricular Hypertrophy in African American Males with End Stage Renal Disease Treated with Hemodialysis. American Society of Nephrology, San Diego, CA, 2003.
- Incidence and Risk Factors of Nocardiosis in Renal Transplant Recipients, Pasumarthy, A., Rankin, S., El-Ghoroury, M., Johnson, L.B., Provenzano, R., Incidence and Risk Factors of Nocardiosis in Renal Transplant Recipients. American Society of Nephrology, San Diego, CA, 2003.
- Once-Weekly (QW) Treatment with Epoetin Alfa in Patients with Anemia Due to Chronic Kidney Disease (CKD), Provenzano, R., Morrison, L., Once-Weekly (QW) Treatment with Epoetin Alfa in Patients with Anemia Due to Chronic Kidney Disease (CKD): Preliminary Analysis. J Am Soc Nephrol 2001:12:A1227.
- An Analysis of Bone Disease-Related Medication Use Throughout ESRD., Johnson, C., McCarthy, J., Tello, A., Provenzano, R., Deane, J. An Analysis of Bone Disease-Related Medication Use Throughout ESRD. National Conference on Dialysis, New Orleans, LA, 2001.
