= Gold Beach (disambiguation) =

Gold Beach was one of the Allied landing points in France during the Battle of Normandy.

Gold Beach or Golden Beach may also refer to:

- Gold Beach, Oregon, United States
- Golden Beach, Florida, United States
- Golden Beach, Greece
- Golden Beach, Maryland, United States
- Golden Beach, Chennai, India
- Golden Beach, Bulgaria

== See also ==
- Gold Coast (disambiguation)
