= Yan Zi (tennis) =

Chinese-Hong Kong tennis player

Yan Zi 晏紫
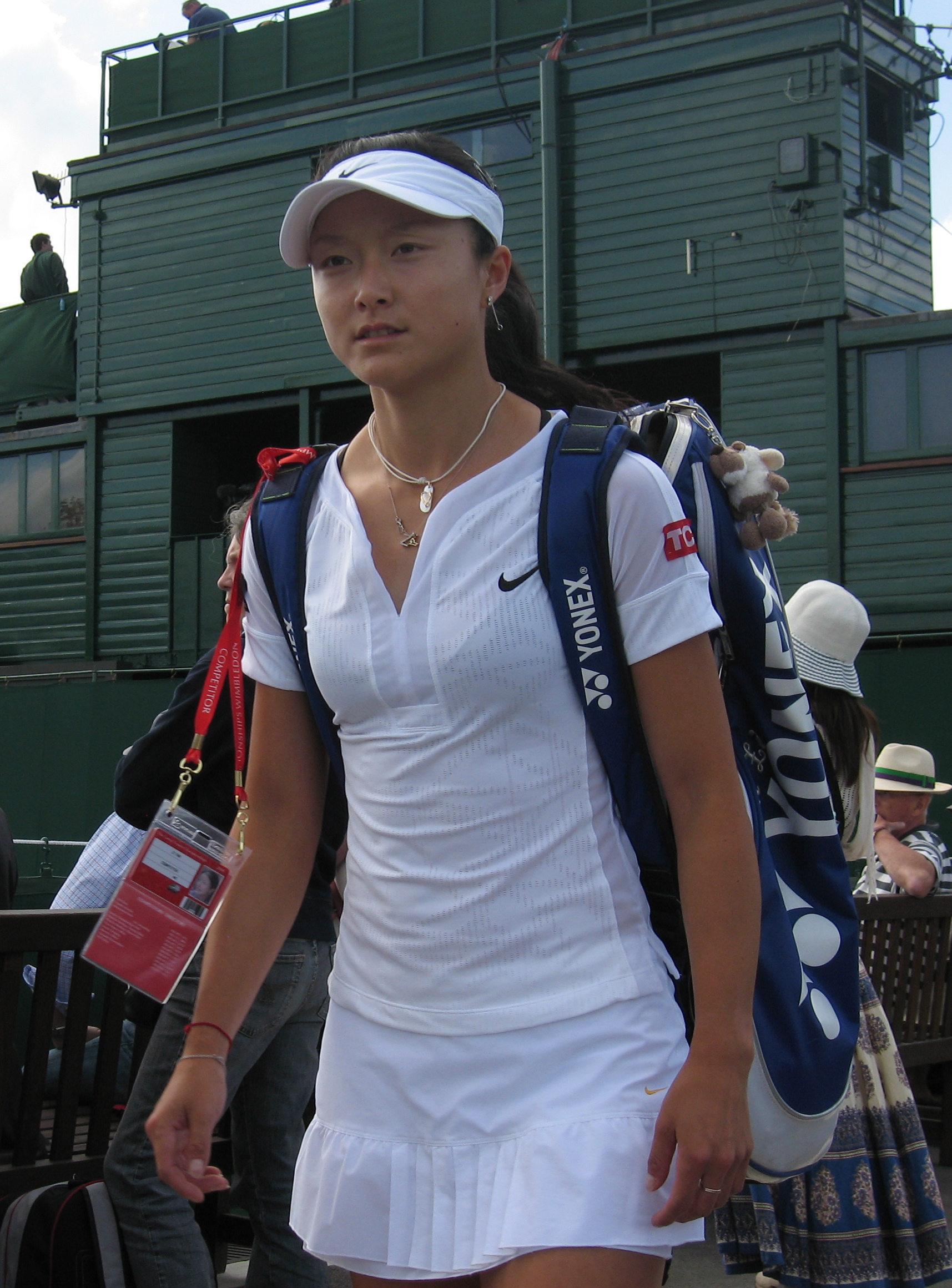
- Country (sports): China (2000–2014); Hong Kong (2014–2016)
- Residence: Hong Kong
- Born: 12 November 1984 (age 42) Chengdu, Sichuan
- Height: 1.71 m (5 ft 7 in)
- Turned pro: February 2003
- Retired: 2016
- Plays: Right (two-handed both sides)
- Prize money: US$ 1,977,871

Singles
- Career record: 199–160
- Career titles: 1
- Highest ranking: No. 40 (5 May 2008)

Grand Slam singles results
- Australian Open: 2R (2006)
- French Open: 1R (2006, 2008)
- Wimbledon: 1R (2006, 2007, 2008)
- US Open: 1R (2006, 2007, 2008)

Doubles
- Career record: 375–179
- Career titles: 17
- Highest ranking: No. 4 (10 July 2006)

Grand Slam doubles results
- Australian Open: W (2006)
- French Open: SF (2006)
- Wimbledon: W (2006)
- US Open: QF (2005, 2006, 2008)

Other doubles tournaments
- Olympic Games: Bronze medal (2008)
Medal record
Women's Tennis
Representing China
Olympic Games
Bronze medal – third place	2008 Beijing	Doubles
Asian Games
Gold medal – first place	2006 Doha	Doubles
Gold medal – first place	2010 Guangzhou	Team event
Bronze medal – third place	2010 Guangzhou	Doubles

Yan Zi
- Chinese: 晏紫
Transcriptions
Standard Mandarin
- Hanyu Pinyin: Yàn Zǐ
- IPA: [jɛ̂n tsì]

Yan Zi (Chinese: 晏紫; born 12 November 1984) is a retired Chinese-Hong Kong tennis player.

== Career summary ==
In 2005, at the age of 20, Yan Zi won her only WTA Tour singles title at the Guangzhou International Open.

In singles, she first reached the world top 100 in January 2006, achieving a then career-high of world No. 72 that March before failing to defend her breakthrough run of results the previous year and dropping back outside the top 100 that October. Her ranking had slumped to 262 by February 2007 after a year of disappointing results, but her results then picked up again over the rest of 2007; and she regained the top 100 for the first time in ten months after a spectacular run at the Tier I Canada Masters in August, reaching the semifinals before finally being defeated by world No. 1, Justine Henin, in straight sets.

In doubles, her highest ranking is No. 4; she won two Grand Slam titles, partnering with Zheng Jie. While she has been good at doubles, her singles performance has been inconsistent as her form fluctuated. She has winning records against top-10 stars Jelena Janković 2–0, Ana Ivanovic 1–0, and Marion Bartoli 1–0.

In 2014, Yan received Hong Kong citizenship. In April 2016, she became captain of the Hong Kong Fed Cup team. Later that year, she announced her retirement.

== Singles career in detail ==
=== 2002–2003 ===
Until January 2002, Yan met with mixed results as a singles player in the lower reaches of the ITF tournament hierarchy. But that month, she reached the final of a $10k event at Hull, losing to Liu Nannan. In May, she avenged this defeat with a win over Liu in the first round of a $50k at Fukuoka; and again in August she defeated Liu, this time in the quarterfinal of a $25k tournament at Beijing, only to lose to Rika Fujiwara in the semifinal. In September, she qualified for the WTA Tour contest at Shanghai, only to lose in the first round. However, she had reached numerous ITF Circuit quarterfinals during the year, and finished it ranked for the first time inside the world top 300, at No. 299.

In February 2003, she narrowly failed to qualify at Hyderabad, losing to Maria Kirilenko in a tight three-set match in the final round of qualifying. She put in her career-best performance to date at Fukuoka, reaching the semifinal with wins over Rika Fujiwara and Sun Tiantian, before losing to Saori Obata despite winning more games, the scoreline standing at 6–2, 6–7, 5–7. In July, she qualified for a WTA event at Palermo by defeating Zheng Jie and Ivana Abramović, then fell in the main-draw first round to Italian rising star Francesca Schiavone in another three-setter in which she won more games than her victorious opponent, the scoreline this time being 6–0, 4–6, 3–6. These defeats suggest that she quickly runs out of steam after giving it all in the first set, thereby allowing her opponent to regroup and eventually pocket the contest. The same week, she defeated Sun Tiantian to qualify for a $50k event at Modena, and in the main draw ousted Yulia Beygelzimer and Adriana Serra Zanetti en route to a quarterfinal loss. In September, she qualified for another WTA event, the Japan Open, and defeated Ashley Harkleroad in round two before losing, on this occasion, to Zheng Jie in the quarterfinals. In December, she reached the semifinal of a $50k tournament for the second time in the year, beating Tzipora Obziler in the quarterfinal at Changsha before losing to another of her prominent countrywomen, Peng Shuai. The following week, she narrowly lost in the quarterfinal of the $50k contest at Shenzhen to future star Sesil Karatantcheva, in three sets. The year had brought great improvement to Yan's singles results, and her year-end ranking correspondingly improved to 179.

=== 2004 ===
Unfortunately, 2004 set back her progress slightly. The year began poorly for her with a string of early losses, although she was ambitiously targeting only WTA Tour events now, raising the bar on the required standard for successful competition. She failed to win a first-round main draw match the entire year, meeting only with moderate success in qualifying rounds; and ultimately the only relief she could find towards salvaging her world ranking was a retreat to ITF Circuit late in the year. She reached the semifinal of a $25k tournament at Beijing in September (losing again to Zheng Jie), and the same stage at Shenzhen (where she shocked Li Na in the quarterfinals, then lost yet again to Zheng). This late flourish of results was enough to limp her home to a year-end ranking of 248.

=== 2005 ===
In January 2005, Yan battled her way past three high-quality opponents, Julia Schruff, Shikha Uberoi and Melinda Czink, to qualify for Tennis Gold Coast, an important WTA event, where she was removed by Tatiana Golovin of France. Then in May, she managed to beat Uberoi again after qualifying for Rabat with a win over Sun Tiantian, only to lose to Arantxa Parra Santonja in the second round. Then in June, she surpassed her previous career-best result, reaching the final of a $50k tournament at Beijing with wins over Sun and Zheng, but lost in the final to less-feted countrywoman Li Ting. The following month, as a direct entrant to the WTA event at Modena, she defeated the much higher-ranked Marta Domachowska of Poland before losing a close three-setter to Sanda Mamić. In September, she avenged her defeat by Li Ting to qualify for Bali, only to succumb to her former doubles partner Li Na in round two of the main draw.

In September 2005, she began competing in the WTA event at Guangzhou, this year upgraded to Tier III status, and placed first of the tournament, despite never having an ITF singles title, and having only once reached the quarter-final stage at any WTA Tour event. She defeated defending champion Li Na in the quarterfinal, scoring 6–7, 7–5, 7–6. The other matches against worthy opposition were not as close, as she beat Marta Domachowska for the loss of just three games in round two, fought past emerging teen star Victoria Azarenka in the semifinal, and was up 6–4, 4–0 against Nuria Llagostera Vives in the final when Nuria conceded victory.

A semifinal result in November's $50k Shenzhen tournament capped off what had proved to be a superlative year for Yan, leaving her world-ranked 104, within the direct-entry threshold of Grand Slam events and minor WTA tournaments, and within the qualifying-entry threshold of even the more exclusive WTA fixtures.

=== 2006 ===
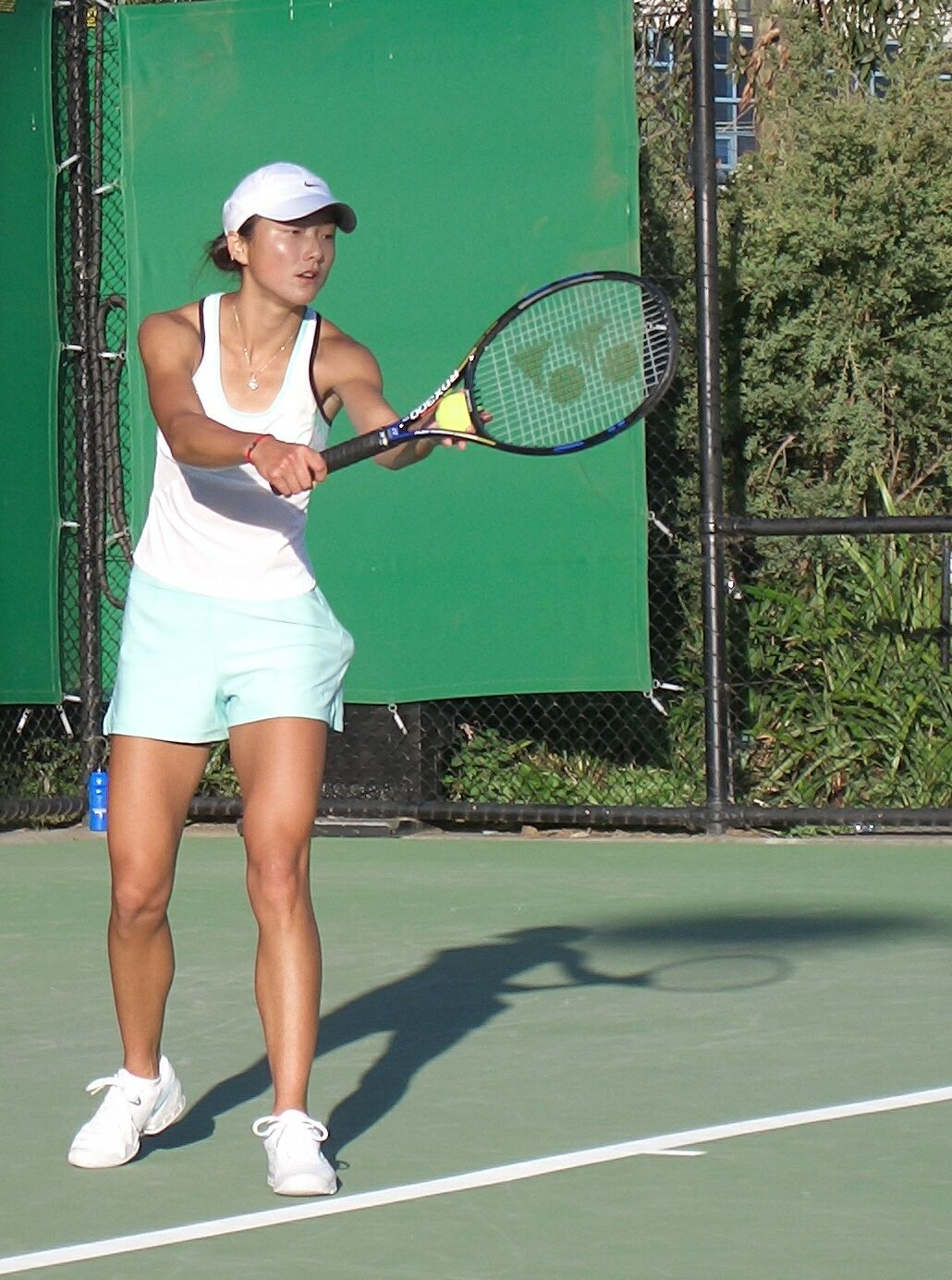
Yan Zi during the first round of the 2006 Australian Open

She began the season by narrowly failing to qualify for Tennis Gold Coast, despite wins over Vania King and Shikha Uberoi, as Angela Haynes defeated her in three sets. But she succeeded in qualifying for Sydney with stunning straight-sets victories over Eva Birnerová, Denisa Chládková and Anastasia Yakimova, and beat the high-ranked Anna Chakvetadze in two sets in the main-draw first round before losing a three-set match to Francesca Schiavone, who had to struggle through a nail-bitingly close second-set tiebreak to avoid a straight sets loss to Yan, only to win the final set by a more comfortable margin.

As if these scores were not enough to prove her capability to the wider world, at the Australian Open she knocked out former No. 15 and the previous year's semifinalist, Nathalie Dechy of France, in the first round, but then lost to former No. 19, Sybille Bammer. February brought more disappointing results in singles for Yan, as she lost a three-setter to Emma Laine of Finland at Pattaya, and failed to qualify for Doha and Dubai. But still, her January results and some points picked up in qualifying rounds in February had improved her world ranking to No. 66, just one place behind Li Na.

=== 2007 ===
At the second round of the Canadian Open in Toronto, she upset world No. 4, Ana Ivanovic, with a score of 6–3, 6–1 in just over an hour, even as Ivanovic had a rare off day. She then beat Eleni Daniilidou in the third round and 2007's Wimbledon's finalist Marion Bartoli (who retired while trailing 2–6, 0–3) in the quarterfinals. Yan's run was ended in the semifinals by world No. 1, Justine Henin, who showed the door through a straight-sets win over her.

=== 2008 ===
Yan started 2008 poorly, with a first-round loss at the Australian Open to eventual quarterfinalist Venus Williams. However, at the Bangalore Open she upset Maria Kirilenko saving three match points. Afterwards she managed to upset Jelena Janković in a quarterfinal, winning 6–3, 3–6, 6–3, however Janković did struggle with a shoulder injury. She eventually lost to runner-up Patty Schnyder in straight sets and made her top-50 debut afterwards at No. 43.

At the Summer Olympics, Yan and her partner Zheng Jie won the women's doubles bronze medal, defeating the Ukrainian duo of Alona and Kateryna Bondarenko in the bronze medal match.

=== 2009 ===
In January, Yan played qualifying singles, women's doubles, and mixed doubles at the Australian Open. In qualifying singles, she was seeded eighth but lost to unseeded Alexandra Panova in the qualifying second round. In women's doubles, she partnered with Zheng Jie and was seeded sixth and lost in the third round. In mixed doubles, she partnered with Mark Knowles of the Bahamas and was seeded second and lost in the second round.

== Olympic medal matches ==
=== Doubles: 1 (bronze) ===
Result	Year	Location	Surface	Partner	Opponents	Score
Bronze	2008	Beijing	Hard	(China) Zheng Jie	(Ukraine) Alona Bondarenko (Ukraine) Kateryna Bondarenko	6–2, 6–2

== WTA Tour finals ==
=== Singles: 1 (title) ===
Legend
Tier I
Tier II
Tier III (1–0)
Tier IV & V

Result	Date	Tournament	Surface	Opponent	Score
Win	Sep 2005	Guangzhou Open, China	Hard	(Spain) Nuria Llagostera Vives	6–4, 4–0 ret.

=== Doubles: 28 (17 titles, 11 runner-ups) ===
Legend before 2009	Starting in 2009
Grand Slam tournaments
Tier I (2–1)	Premier Mandatory
Tier II (2–2)	Premier 5
Tier III (6–4)	Premier (1–2)
Tier IV & V (3–2)	International (1–0)

Result	W–L	Date	Tournament	Surface	Partner	Opponents	Score
Loss	1.	Jun 2003	Vienna Open, Austria	Clay	(China) Zheng Jie	(China) Li Ting (China) Sun Tiantian	3–6, 4–6
Win	1.	Jan 2005	Hobart International, Australia	Hard	(China) Zheng Jie	(Spain) Anabel Medina Garrigues (Russia) Dinara Safina	6–4, 7–5
Win	2.	Feb 2005	Hyderabad Open, India	Hard	(China) Zheng Jie	(China) Li Ting (China) Sun Tiantian	6–4, 6–1
Loss	2.	Sep 2005	Bali International, Indonesia	Hard	(China) Zheng Jie	(Germany) Anna-Lena Grönefeld (United States) Meghann Shaughnessy	3–6, 3–6
Loss	3.	Sep 2005	Beijing Open, China	Hard	(China) Zheng Jie	(Venezuela) María Vento-Kabchi (Spain) Nuria Llagostera Vives	2–6, 4–6
Win	3.	Jan 2006	Australian Open	Hard	(China) Zheng Jie	(United States) Lisa Raymond (Australia) Samantha Stosur	2–6, 7–6^{(9–7)}, 6–3
Loss	4.	Feb 2006	Pattaya Open, Thailand	Hard	(China) Zheng Jie	(China) Li Ting (China) Sun Tiantian	6–3, 1–6, 6–7^{(5–7)}
Win	4.	May 2006	German Open	Clay	(China) Zheng Jie	(Russia) Elena Dementieva (Italy) Flavia Pennetta	6–2, 6–3
Win	5.	May 2006	Rabat Grand Prix, Morocco	Clay	(China) Zheng Jie	(United States) Ashley Harkleroad (United States) Bethanie Mattek	6–1, 6–3
Win	6.	Jun 2006	Rosmalen Open, Netherlands	Grass	(China) Zheng Jie	(Serbia) Ana Ivanovic (Russia) Maria Kirilenko	3–6, 6–2, 6–2
Win	7.	Jul 2006	Wimbledon Championships, UK	Grass	(China) Zheng Jie	(Spain) Virginia Ruano Pascual (Argentina) Paola Suárez	6–3, 3–6, 6–2
Loss	5.	Jul 2006	Nordic Light Open, Sweden	Hard	(China) Zheng Jie	(Czech Republic) Eva Birnerová (Slovakia) Jarmila Gajdošová	6–0, 4–6, 2–6
Win	8.	Aug 2006	New Haven Open, United States	Hard	(China) Zheng Jie	(United States) Lisa Raymond (Australia) Samantha Stosur	6–4, 6–2
Win	9.	Apr 2007	Charleston Open, United States	Clay	(China) Zheng Jie	(China) Peng Shuai (China) Sun Tiantian	7–5, 6–0
Win	10.	May 2007	Internationaux de Strasbourg, France	Clay	(China) Zheng Jie	(Australia) Alicia Molik (China) Sun Tiantian	6–3, 6–4
Win	11.	Sep 2007	Guangzhou International, China	Hard	(China) Peng Shuai	(United States) Vania King (China) Sun Tiantian	6–3, 6–4
Win	12.	Oct 2007	Tokyo Championships, Japan	Hard	(China) Sun Tiantian	(Chinese Taipei) Chuang Chia-jung (United States) Vania King	1–6, 6–2, [10–6]
Win	13.	Oct 2007	Bangkok Open, Thailand	Hard	(China) Sun Tiantian	(Japan) Ayumi Morita (Japan) Junri Namigata	w/o
Loss	6.	Jan 2008	Gold Coast Hardcourts, Australia	Hard	(China) Zheng Jie	(Russia) Dinara Safina (Hungary) Ágnes Szávay	1–6, 2–6
Win	14.	Jan 2008	Sydney International, Australia	Hard	(China) Zheng Jie	(Ukraine) Tatiana Perebiynis (Belarus) Tatiana Poutchek	6–4, 7–6^{(7–5)}
Loss	7.	Mar 2008	Dubai Championships, United Arab Emirates	Hard	(China) Zheng Jie	(Zimbabwe) Cara Black (United States) Liezel Huber	5–7, 2–6
Loss	8.	Mar 2008	Indian Wells Open, United States	Hard	(China) Zheng Jie	(Russia) Dinara Safina (Russia) Elena Vesnina	1–6, 6–1, [8–10]
Win	15.	May 2008	Internationaux de Strasbourg, France	Clay	(Ukraine) Tatiana Perebiynis	(Chinese Taipei) Chan Yung-jan (Chinese Taipei) Chuang Chia-jung	6–4, 6–7^{(3–7)}, [10–6]
Loss	9.	Sep 2008	Guangzhou International Open, China	Hard	(China) Sun Tiantian	(Ukraine) Mariya Koryttseva (Belarus) Tatiana Poutchek	6–3, 2–6, [8–10]
Loss	10.	May 2009	Warsaw Open, Poland	Clay	(China) Zheng Jie	(United States) Raquel Kops-Jones (United States) Bethanie Mattek-Sands	1–6, 1–6
Win	16.	Aug 2009	LA Championships, United States	Hard	(Chinese Taipei) Chuang Chia-jung	(Russia) Maria Kirilenko (Poland) Agnieszka Radwańska	6–0, 4–6, [10–7]
Win	17.	Apr 2010	Ponte Vedra Championships, U.S.	Clay	(United States) Bethanie Mattek-Sands	(Chinese Taipei) Chuang Chia-jung (China) Peng Shuai	4–6, 6–4, [10–8]
Loss	11.	May 2010	Warsaw Open, Poland	Clay	(Zimbabwe) Cara Black	(Spain) Virginia Ruano Pascual (United States) Meghann Shaughnessy	3–6, 4–6

== ITF Circuit finals ==
Legend
$75,000 tournaments
$50,000 tournaments
$25,000 tournaments
$10,000 tournaments

=== Singles: 2 (2 runner-ups) ===
Result	W–L	Date	Tournament	Surface	Opponent	Score
Loss	0–1	27 January 2002	ITF Hull, United Kingdom	Hard (i)	(China) Liu Nannan	1–6, 2–6
Loss	0–2	12 June 2005	Beijing Challenger, China	Hard	(China) Li Ting	1–6, 3–6

=== Doubles: 23 (16 titles, 7 runner-ups) ===
Result	W–L	Date	Tournament	Surface	Partner	Opponents	Score
Loss	0–1	10 September 2000	ITF Zhejiang, China	Hard	(China) Zheng Jie	(China) Chen Yan (China) Sun Tiantian	3–6, 5–7
Win	1–1	4 June 2001	ITF Hohhot, China	Hard	(China) Zheng Jie	(China) Chen Yan (China) Sun Tiantian	6–4, 2–6, 6–3
Win	2–1	3 February 2002	ITF Tipton, United Kingdom	Hard (i)	(China) Zheng Jie	(Netherlands) Tessy van de Ven (Netherlands) Suzanne van Hartingsveldt	6–1, 6–3
Win	4.	14 April 2002	ITF Ho Chi Minh City, Vietnam	Hard	(China) Zheng Jie	(Japan) Ayami Takase (Japan) Remi Tezuka	6–1, 1–6, 6–2
Win	5.	15 April 2002	ITF Cagliari, Italy	Clay	(China) Zheng Jie	(China) Li Na (China) Li Ting	6–4, 6–0
Win	6.	23 April 2002	ITF Taranto, Italy	Clay	(China) Zheng Jie	(Slovakia) Eva Fislová (Slovakia) Stanislava Hrozenská	6–2, 6–2
Win	7.	29 April 2002	ITF Maglie, Italy	Carpet (i)	(China) Zheng Jie	(United States) Edina Gallovits-Hall (Romania) Magda Mihalache	6–4, 6–1
Win	8.	19 May 2002	ITF Shanghai, China	Hard	(China) Zheng Jie	(China) He Chunyan (China) Liu Weijuan	6–2, 6–2
Win	9.	26 May 2002	ITF Tianjin, China	Hard (i)	(China) Zheng Jie	(Chinese Taipei) Chan Chin-wei (Chinese Taipei) Chuang Chia-jung	6–0, 6–4
Loss	10.	11 August 2002	ITF Beijing, China	Hard	(China) Zheng Jie	(China) Li Ting (China) Sun Tiantian	5–7, 3–6
DNP	–	11 March 2003	ITF Fountain Hills, United States	Hard	(China) Zheng Jie	(Australia) Alicia Molik (Australia) Trudi Musgrave	—N/a
Win	11.	18 March 2003	ITF Redding, United States	Hard	(China) Zheng Jie	(United States) Jennifer Hopkins (United States) Abigail Spears	7–6^{(3)}, 7–6^{(5)}
Win	12.	16 June 2003	ITF Gorizia, Italy	Clay	(China) Zheng Jie	(China) Li Ting (China) Sun Tiantian	7–6^{(5)}, 1–6, 6–4
Win	13.	30 June 2003	ITF Orbetello, Italy	Clay	(China) Zheng Jie	(China) Li Ting (China) Sun Tiantian	6–2, 7–5
Win	14.	19 October 2003	ITF Sedona, United States	Clay	(China) Zheng Jie	(Russia) Alina Jidkova (Paraguay) Rossana de los Ríos	7–6^{(2)}, 7–6^{(3)}
Win	15.	20 October 2003	ITF Paducah, United States	Hard	(China) Zheng Jie	(South Africa) Kim Grant (United States) Samantha Reeves	6–2, 6–3
Loss	16.	30 November 2003	ITF Changsha, China	Hard	(China) Zheng Jie	(China) Li Ting (China) Sun Tiantian	4–6, 2–6
Loss	17.	7 December 2003	ITF Shenzhen, China	Hard	(China) Zheng Jie	(China) Li Ting (China) Sun Tiantian	3–6, 6–3, 4–6
Win	18.	26 October 2004	ITF Shenzhen	Hard	(China) Zheng Jie	(Chinese Taipei) Chuang Chia-jung (Chinese Taipei) Hsieh Su-wei	6–3, 6–1
Loss	19.	7 November 2004	ITF Shenzhen	Hard	(China) Zheng Jie	(Japan) Rika Fujiwara (Ukraine) Elena Tatarkova	4–6, 6–1, 1–6
Win	20.	6 June 2005	Beijing Challenger, China	Hard	(China) Zheng Jie	(China) Li Ting (China) Sun Tiantian	6–1, 7–5
Loss	21.	7 August 2005	ITF Washington, United States	Clay	(United States) Jennifer Hopkins	(Ukraine) Olena Antypina (Belarus) Tatiana Poutchek	4–6, 4–6
Win	22.	13 November 2005	ITF Shenzhen, China	Hard	(Chinese Taipei) Hsieh Su-wei	(Chinese Taipei) Chan Chin-wei (Chinese Taipei) Hsu Wen-hsin	6–0, 6–2
Loss	23.	10 January 2010	Blossom Cup, China	Hard	(Ukraine) Yuliya Beygelzimer	(China) Liu Wanting (China) Zhou Yimiao	1–6, 2–6

== Grand Slam performance timelines ==
Key
W	F	SF	QF	#R	RR	Q#	DNQ	A	NH

(W) winner; (F) finalist; (SF) semifinalist; (QF) quarterfinalist; (#R) rounds 4, 3, 2, 1; (RR) round-robin stage; (Q#) qualification round; (DNQ) did not qualify; (A) absent; (NH) not held; (SR) strike rate (events won / competed); (W–L) win–loss record.

=== Singles ===
Tournament	2003	2004	2005	2006	2007	2008	SR	W–L
Grand Slam tournaments
Australian Open	A	LQ	A	2R	LQ	1R	0 / 2	1–2
French Open	A	A	A	1R	A	1R	0 / 2	0–2
Wimbledon	A	LQ	A	1R	1R	1R	0 / 3	0–3
US Open	LQ	A	LQ	1R	1R	1R	0 / 3	0–3
Win–loss	0–0	0–0	0–0	1–4	0–2	0–4	N/A	1–10
Olympic Games
Summer Olympics	NH	A	NH	NH	NH		0 / 0	0–0
Tier I tournaments
Doha^{1}	Not Tier I					2R	0 / 1	1–1
Indian Wells	A	A	A	1R	A	2R	0 / 2	1–2
Miami	A	1R	A	1R	A	A	0 / 2	0–2
Charleston	A	LQ	A	A	A	A	0 / 1	0–1
Berlin	A	1R	A	LQ	2R	2R	0 / 4	6–4
Rome	A	A	A	A	2R	1R	0 / 2	3–2
Toronto/Montréal	A	A	A	A	SF	A	0 / 1	6–1
Tokyo	A	LQ	A	A	LQ	A	0 / 2	4–2
Moscow	A	A	A	A	A	A	0 / 0	0–0
Previous Tier I tournaments
San Diego^{1}	NTI	A	A	A	A	NH	0 / 0	0–0
Zürich^{1}	A	A	A	LQ	A	NTI	0 / 1	0–1

- ^{1}as of 2008, Doha is a Tier I tournament, replacing San Diego and Zurich

==== Doubles ====
Tournament	2003	2004	2005	2006	2007	2008	2009	2010	2011	2012	2013	W–L
Australian Open	A	QF	1R	W	SF	SF	3R	QF	2R	A	1R	23–8
French Open	A	1R	3R	SF	1R	3R	QF	3R	A	A	A	13–7
Wimbledon	A	3R	A	W	QF	3R	3R	2R	A	A	1R	16–6
US Open	1R	2R	QF	QF	2R	QF	QF	2R	A	A	A	15–8
Win–loss	0–1	6–4	5–3	19–2	8–4	11–4	10–4	7–4	1–1	0–0	0–2	67–29

== See also ==
- Peng Shuai
