= Nicole Vogel =

American magazine publisher and author

- Education: American University
- Occupations: Publisher, author
- Writing career
- Language: English
- Notable work: Portland Monthly
- Notable awards: Oregon Entrepreneurs Network Entrepreneurship Award for Individual Achievement

Nicole Vogel is an American magazine publisher and author. She is the cofounder and publisher of Portland Monthly, a regional magazine covering Portland, Oregon. She received the 2007 Oregon Entrepreneurs Network Entrepreneurship Award for Individual Achievement, the second woman to receive the honor.

== Career ==
Vogel started her publishing career with a job at Leaders Magazine in New York. In 2002, she got a job at Turner Broadcasting, and within three years was the vice president of strategy. Vogel's work for Turner focused specifically on business development for CNN's interactive properties.

In 2001, she and her brother Scott Vogel moved to Portland, Oregon, to be close to their sister Lori, whose husband had been killed in a car accident. While there, they realized the city did not have a regional magazine despite being a large market, so she set out to raise funds to start the magazine. She faced difficulties both for being a woman entrepreneur in a male-dominated industry as well as to start a print publication when circulation for print magazines was declining.

Portland Monthly launched in 2003 along with its parent company SagaCity Media, also co-owned by Nicole Vogel and Scott Vogel, and was profitable by its second issue. In March 2006, she launched Seattle, Washington local magazine Seattle Metropolitan, also under the SagaCity Media parent company.

In March 2013, SagaCity Media purchased five magazines in Utah and Colorda, including Aspen Sojourner, Vail-Beaver Creek Magazine and Park City Magazine. In April 2013, she and her brother started Houstonia, the city magazine for Houston, Texas. In November 2025, SagaCity Media, filed for receivership. In March 2026, the company sold its publications to Hour Media for $1.6 million. Seven staffers were then laid off.

== Personal ==
Vogel is a native of Houston, Texas. She graduated from American University with a degree in justice.
