= Tom Hartle =

American publisher

Tom Hartle is the founder of CoherentRx, a healthcare technology company that produces Patient Education Genius and other healthcare communication applications.

In 1995, Hartle founded Hour Media, which publishes Hour Detroit - a Detroit lifestyle magazine and website, with business partners John Balardo and Stefan Wanczyk. Crain's Detroit Business named Hartle as one of the magazine's 40 under 40 in 1998.

In 2000, he sold out of the company and launched Hartle Media with then partner Heather Hartle. Hartle Media launched 7x7, a bimonthly San Francisco lifestyle magazine and website, in 2001. In 2004, Hartle Media bought California Home + Design, a California home and garden magazine and website, with partner, the McEvoy Group.

In 2006, Hartle Media partnered with the McEvoy Group to buy Spin Media, publisher of Spin, a music magazine and website. Hartle served as president of Spin until February 2010. In April 2010, he co-founded Bandwdth Publishing, an app publishing house devoted to the arts and sciences. Bandwdth Publishing creates educational products for app-enabled devices. Titles include: Bygone Days, an American history app for the iPad, the Bandwdth Artist Dashboard for the Samsung Smart TV, KoЯn and Uproar Tour apps for the iPhone, a KoЯn SMS program, and a Patti Smith: Dream of Life app for the iPad, a virtual art gallery complement to the documentary of the same name.

Hartle is an alumnus of Boston University and Seaholm High School in Birmingham, Michigan.
