= Rich's Cigar Store =

Shop

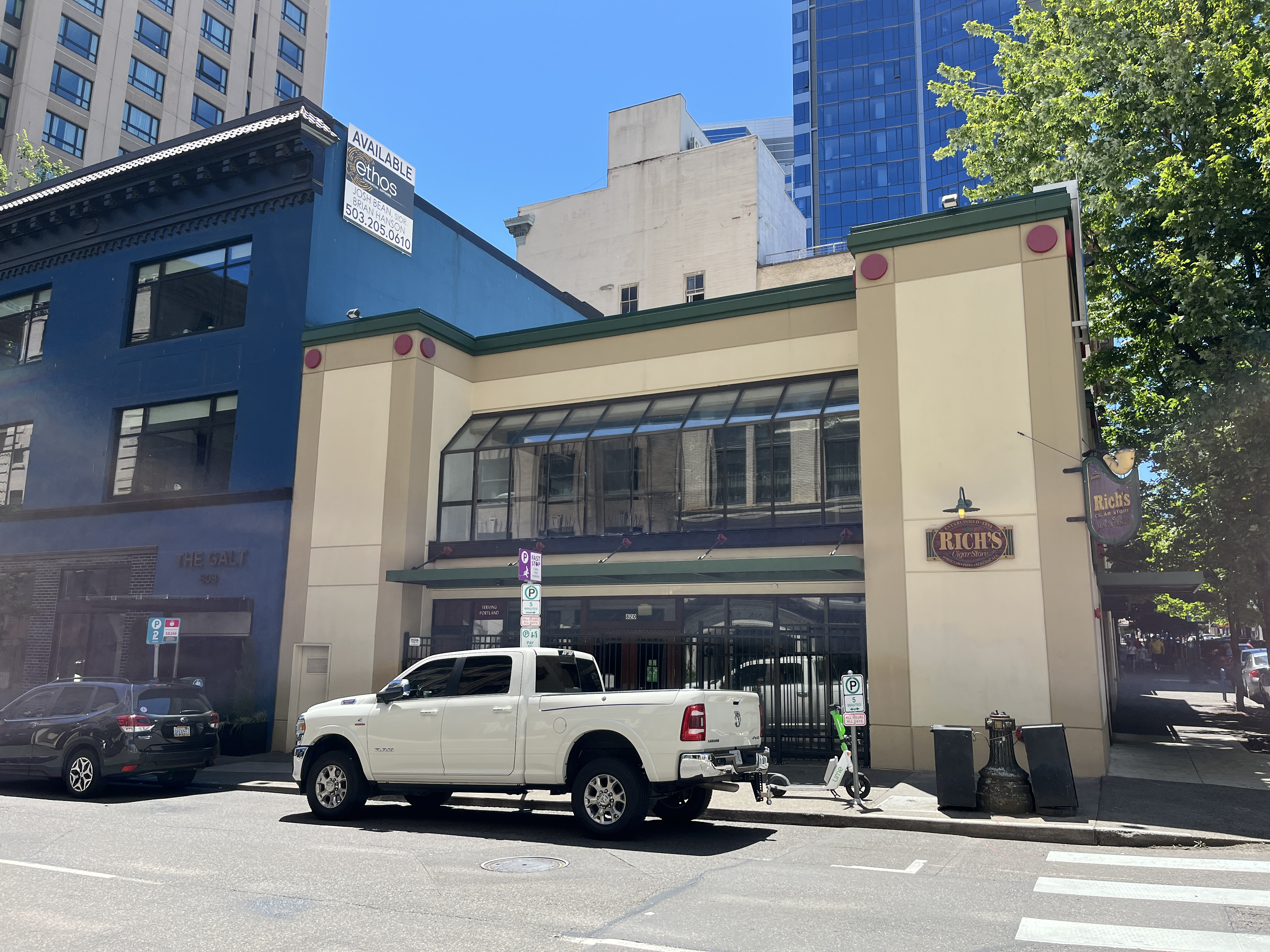
The store in downtown Portland in 2023

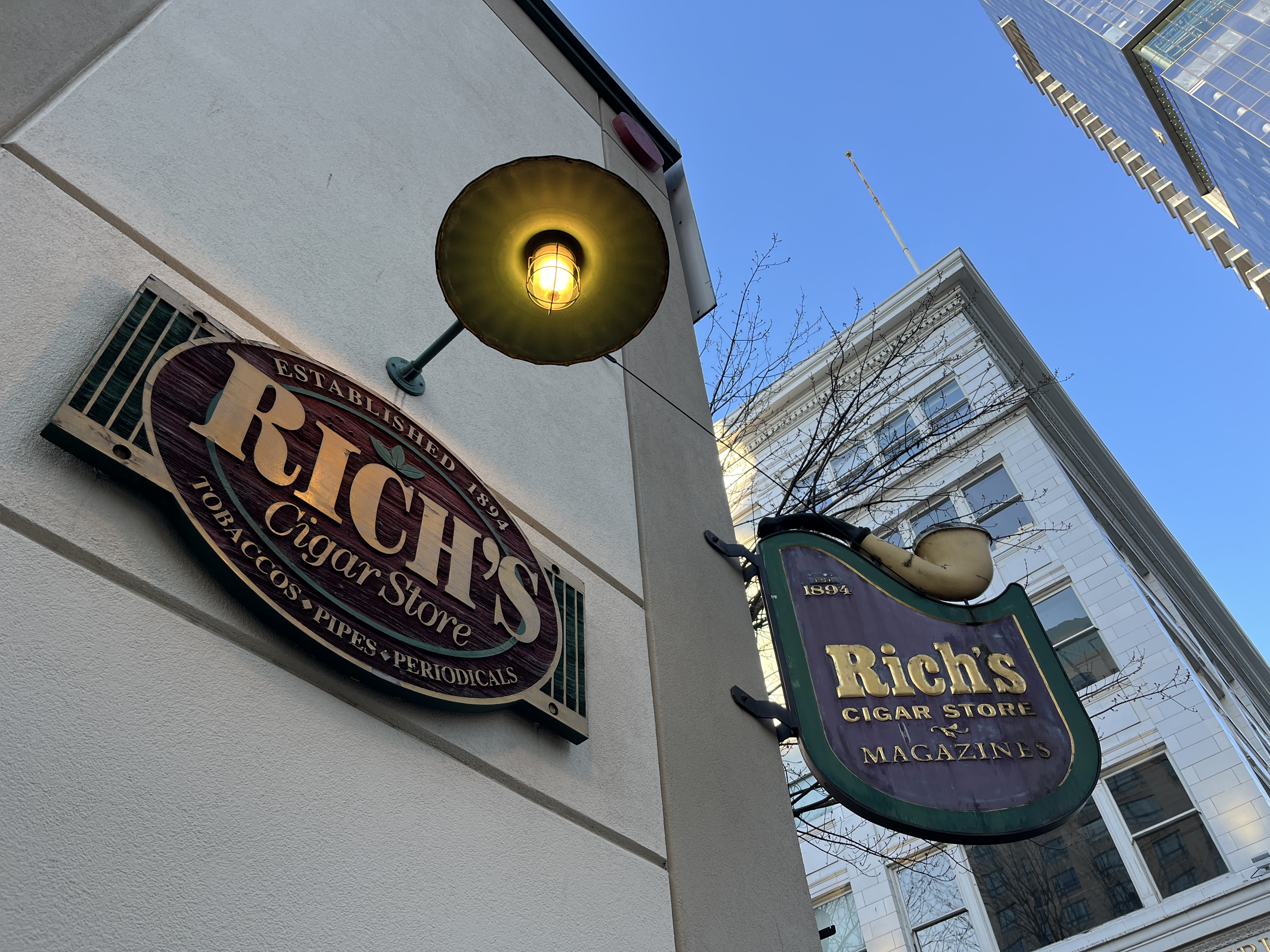
Exterior signage

Rich's Cigar Store is a shop with two locations in Portland, Oregon, United States.

== Description and history ==
Established in 1894, the family-owned business is the longest operating retailer in the city. It carries tobacco products including cigars and pipes as well as international magazines and newspapers. The business stocks 200 types of tobacco.

== Reception ==
Portland Monthly says the shop is "one of the West Coast's best selections of magazines", and Willamette Week says Rich's Cigar Store has "Portland's largest and most impressive selection of magazines and international newspapers".
