= Raygun Lounge =

Gaming venue in Seattle, Washington, U.S.

- Logo

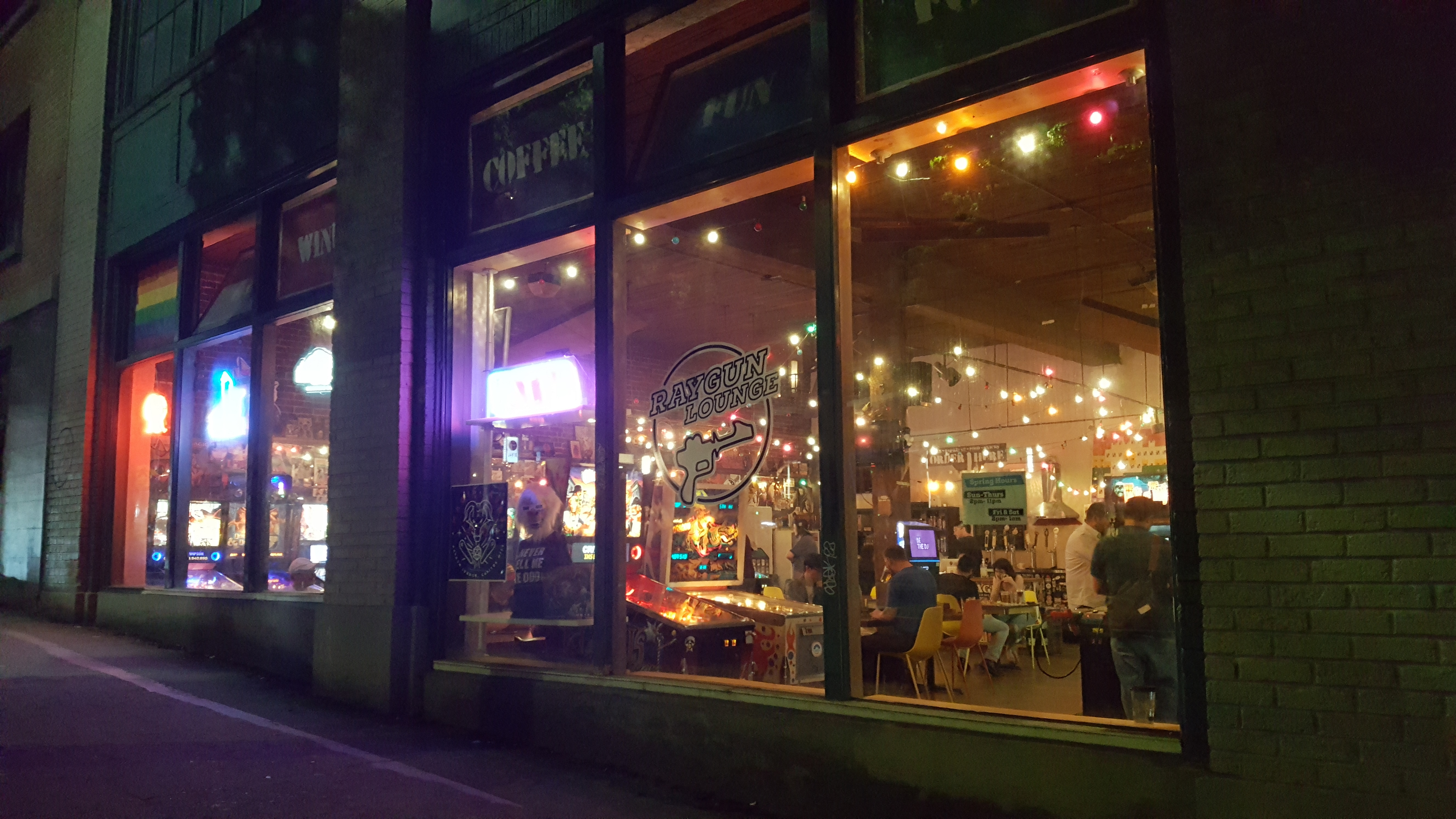
- The venue's exterior at night, 2022
- Interactive map of Raygun Lounge
- Address: Seattle, Washington; United States
- Location: 501 East Pine Street
- Coordinates: 47°36′54″N 122°19′31″W

Website
- raygunlounge.com

Raygun Lounge is a gaming venue in Seattle's Capitol Hill neighborhood, in the U.S. state of Washington.

== Description and history ==
Raygun Lounge is a "gaming hall" in Seattle's Capitol Hill neighborhood. The venue offers arcade games and pinball, as well as food and drink options such as naan sandwiches, samosas, beer, coffee, and wine.

Raygun Lounge opened on East Pine in 2012, replacing Travelers Tea House. Stefan Milne of the Seattle Metropolitan described the combined space as "a bar, a pinball sanctuary, [and] a tabletop game shop".

Raygun Lounge has hosted various events, including a book reading in 2014 and a trivia night in 2017 in conjunction with gaming convention PAX.

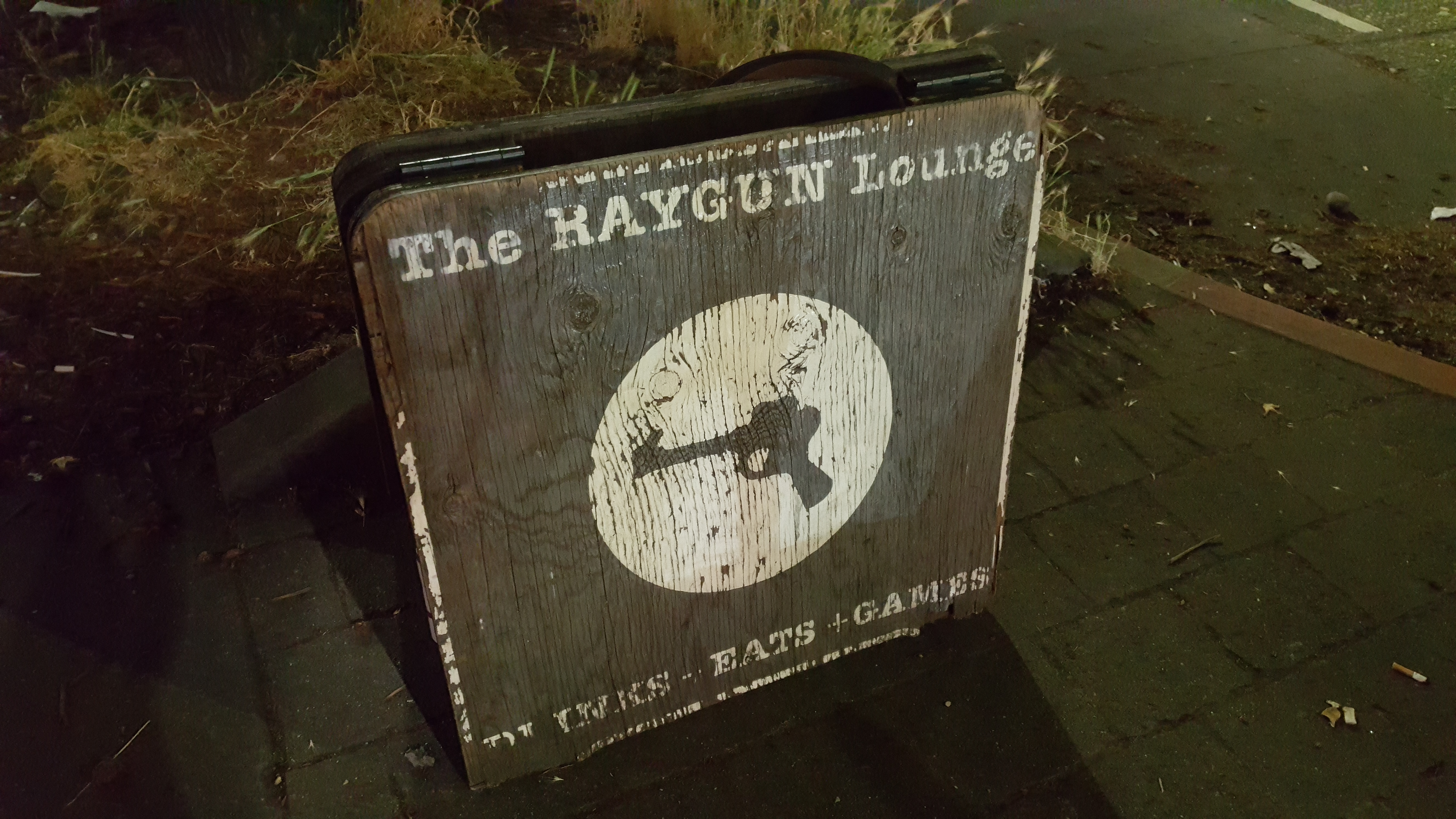
Exterior sign

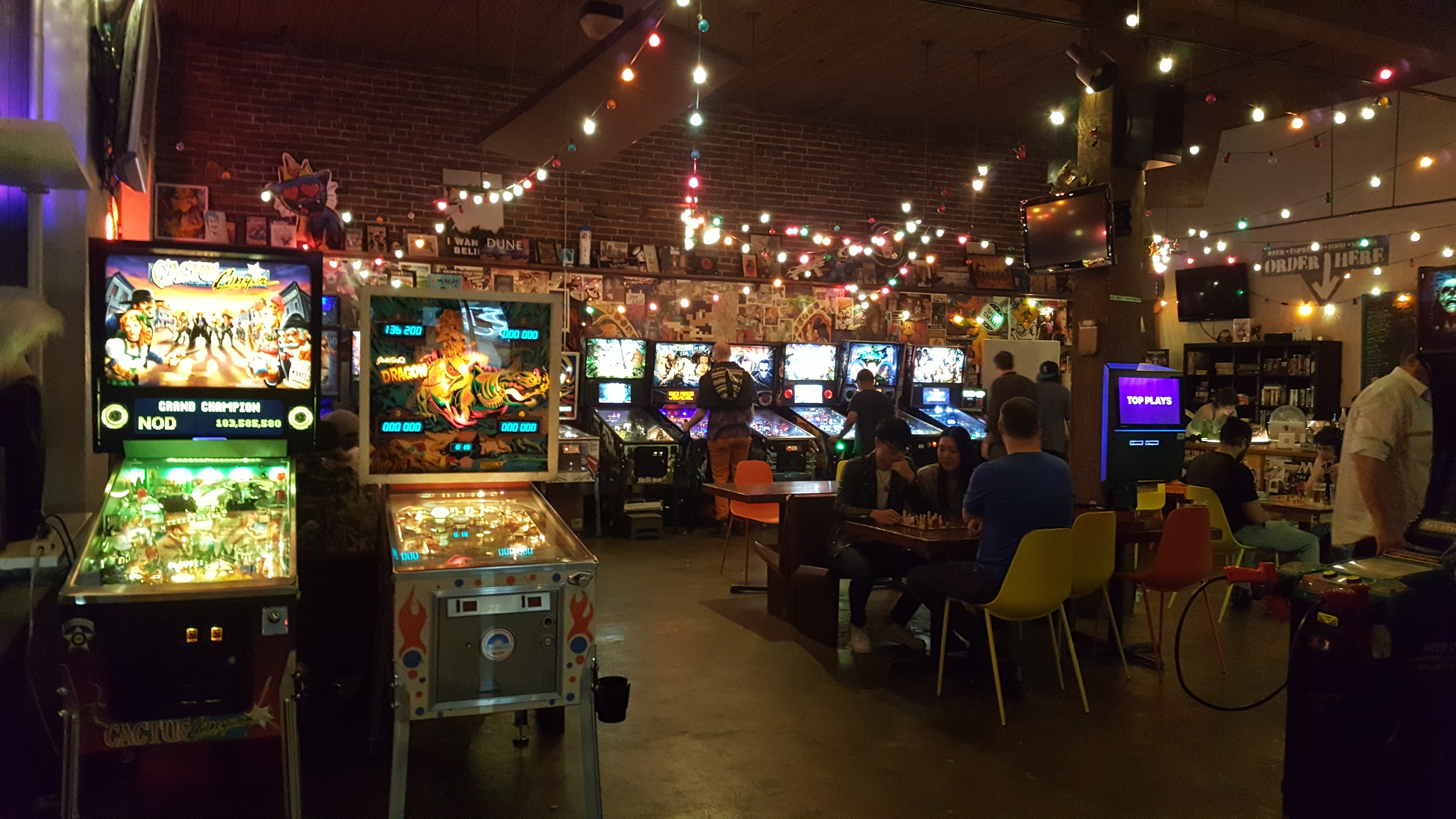
The venue's interior, 2022

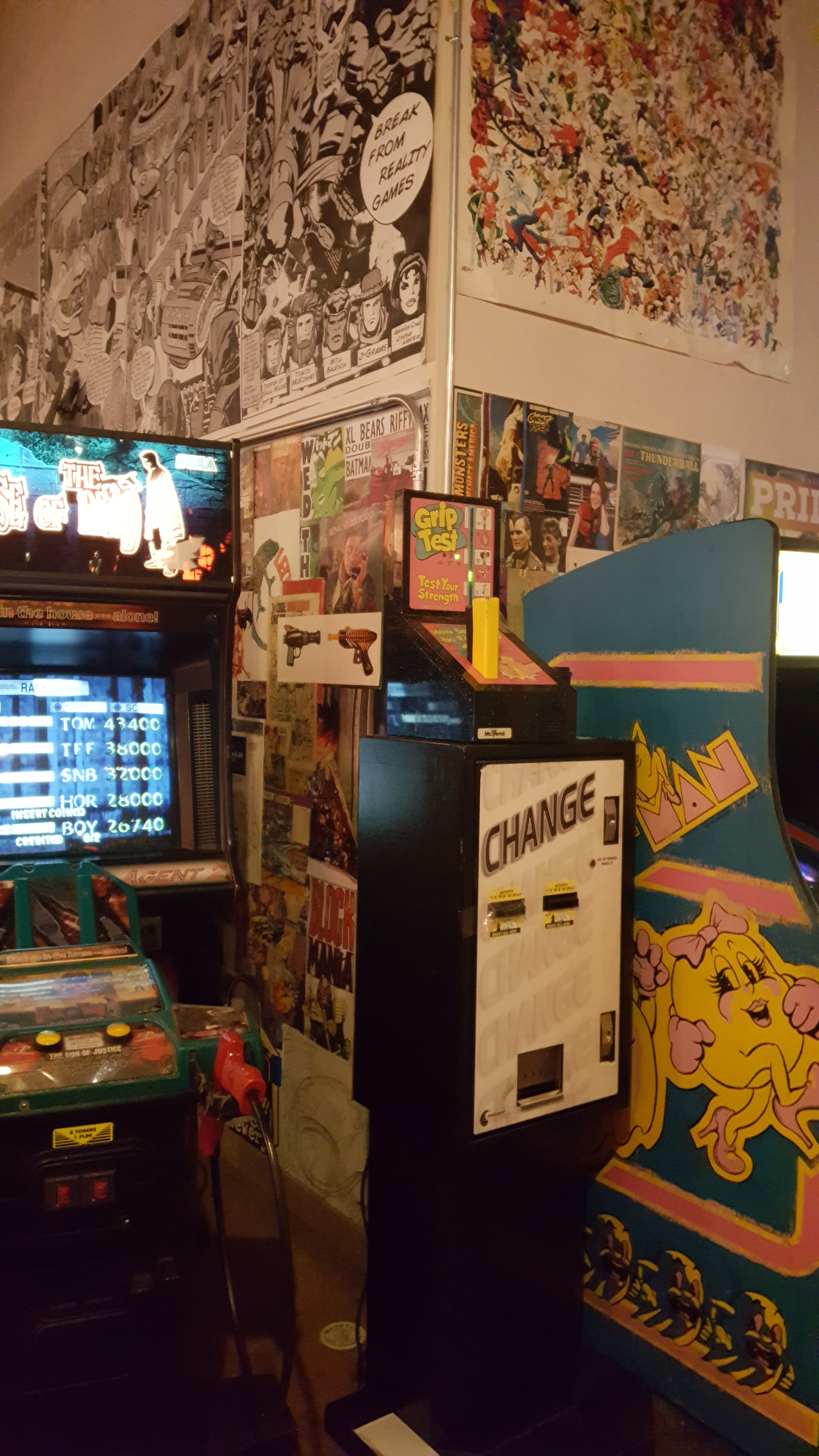
Arcade games and wall decorations

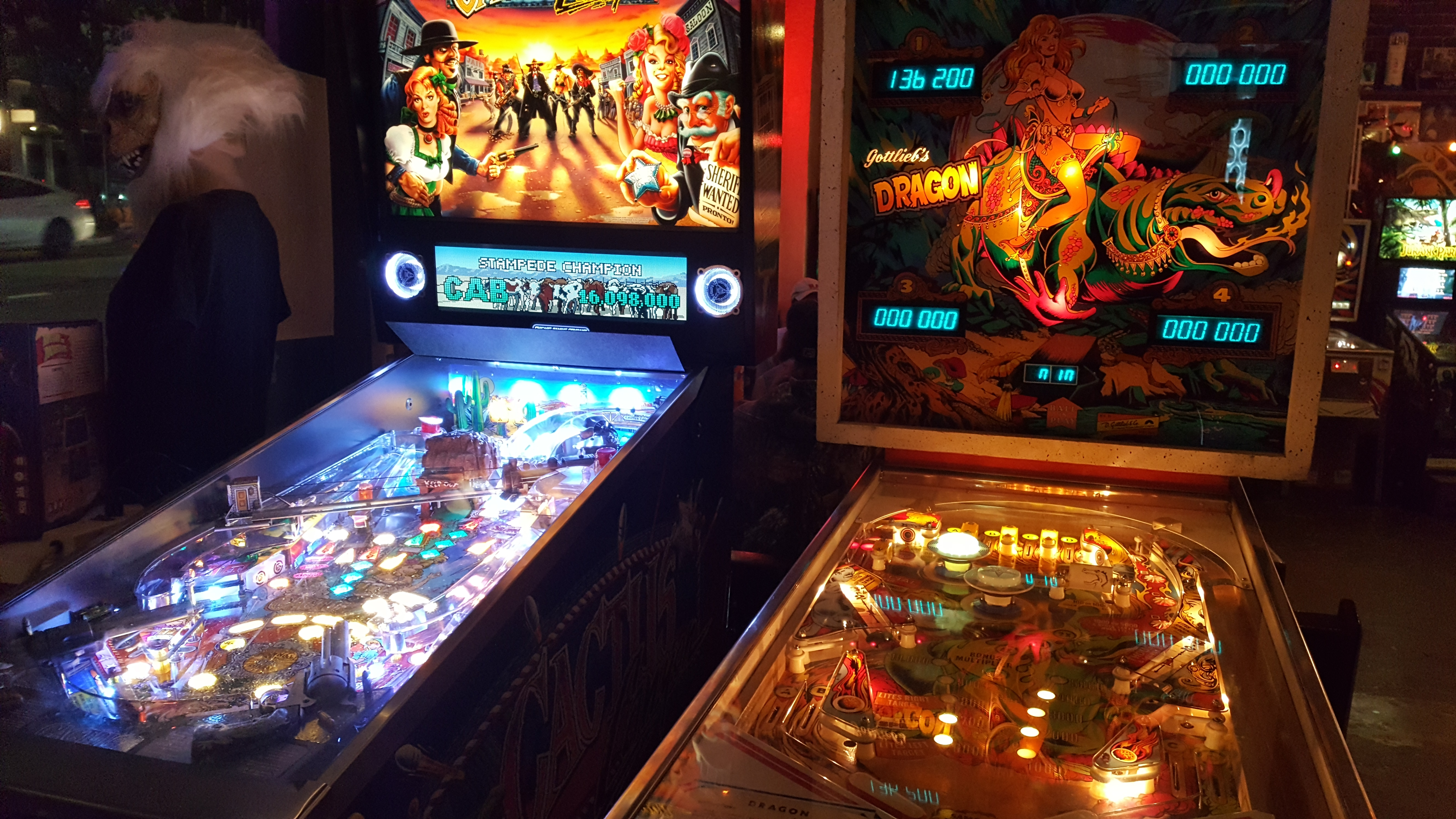
Pinball machines
