= Houstonia (magazine) =

American magazine

- Founding editor: Scott Vogel
- Former editors: Nandi Howard
- Categories: City magazine
- Frequency: Bi-Monthly
- Publisher: Stevi Maytubby
- Paid circulation: 100%
- Unpaid circulation: 0%
- Total circulation: approx. 70,000
- Founder: Nicole Vogel
- Founded: Spring 2013
- First issue: April 2013
- Company: SagaCity Media
- Country: United States
- Based in: Houston, Texas
- Language: English
- Website: www.houstoniamag.com
- ISSN: 2327-0926
- OCLC: 828866286

Houstonia is a magazine about Houston and Greater Houston, Texas, United States. It is published by Hour Media. The magazine's first issue released in April 2013, titled 250 Reasons to Love Houston. As of January 2016, the magazine is distributed at 800 locations in Greater Houston, including newsstands, retail outlets, and grocery stores.

The president of SagaCity, Nicole Vogel, and her brother Scott, the founding editor of Houstonia, were born and raised in Houston. In addition, Houstonia was given an AMA Marketer of the Year award for media. The magazine's circulation is upwards of 70,000, while its average monthly readership is over 510,000 and houstoniamag.com generally receives approximately 400,000 views per month.

== Background Information ==
The magazine first appeared in newsstands in April 2013. When the magazine launched, food critic Robb Walsh became an employee. In May 2013, Katharine Shilcutt, a food critic for the Houston Press, announced she was going to leave the Press and begin working for Houstonia.

The magazine also recruited Catherine Matusow from the Houston Press and Sarah Rufca from the Houston Chronicle. In sales, Marianna Dubinsky and Diane Caplan joined the team in 2014.

In 2017, publisher Diane Caplan left to start her own company, and former senior media manager Stevi Maytubby replaced her as publisher.

In November 2025, SagaCity Media, the company owned by the Vogels which published their magazines, filed for receivership. In March 2026, the company sold its publications, including Houstonia, to Hour Media for $1.6 million. Two of the five editorial workers at the magazine were then laid off.

== Magazine Departments ==
The magazine's front-of-the-book section is called Ice House while others offer similarly-Houston-themed titles and Houston-centric coverage: Clutch City features local designers and decor; Bayougraphy profiles interesting Houstonians from Hakeem Olajuwon to Mireille Enos; and The Drawl captures the city's zeitgeist in illustrated form on the last page of the book. The magazine also includes a dining section, On the Table, and an arts & entertainment section, On the Town, which focuses on current shows and events in the city. Throughout all of the departments, a drawing of a native bird, the grackle, is seen messing up the design up and causing havoc in the pages.

== Website Content ==
In addition to offering print content to buy, Houstonia also publishes a collection of weekly blogs and articles, some featured in the magazine, others website-only. These include Gastronaut, a food and dining blog; On the Town, a continuation of stories featured in the magazine's arts & entertainment section; Shop Talk, which covers everything from beauty and fashion to style and fitness; and Wanderlust, the magazine's travel blog.

== See also ==
- Magazines in Houston
