= Seattle Metropolitan =

US monthly magazine

Seattle Met
- Cover dated October 2006
- Editor-in-chief: Eric Nusbaum
- Former editors: Angela Cabotaje
- Categories: Local interest
- Frequency: monthly
- Circulation: 58,900
- Publisher: Nicole Vogel
- Founded: 2006
- First issue: March 1, 2006
- Company: Hour Media
- Country: USA
- Based in: Seattle, Washington
- Language: English
- Website: seattlemet.com
- ISSN: 1931-2792

Seattle Metropolitan or Seattle Met, is a monthly city magazine covering Seattle, Washington. Its first issue was published in March 2006, and features reporting and feature articles on Seattle events, politics, people, dining and restaurants, popular places, and attractions.

== Publisher history ==
SagaCity Media began publishing the magazine Portland Monthly in 2003. It expanded to the Seattle market with the March 2006 debut of Seattle Metropolitan. At the beginning of 2010, the publisher bought magazines from several Colorado cities including Vail-Beaver Creek, Aspen Sojourner, and Park City. Among its major competitors is Seattle Magazine, which serves a similar market niche. SagaCity sold its magazines to Hour Media in March 2026 after a spell in court receivership.

== See also ==
- Portland Monthly
