= Orange Coast (magazine) =

American lifestyle magazine

- Categories: Lifestyle Magazine
- Frequency: Monthly
- First issue: February 1974; 52 years ago
- Company: Engine Vision Media, LLC
- Country: United States
- Based in: Irvine, California
- Language: English
- Website: www.orangecoast.com
- ISSN: 0279-0483
- OCLC: 7479329

Orange Coast is an American lifestyle magazine published for the Orange County, California region. Established in February 1974, Orange Coast is the oldest continuously published lifestyle magazine in the region. Orange Coast includes coverage of the region'a people, places, cuisine, fashion, home design and décor, and events. The magazine has been owned by Hour Media Group since 2017.

The magazine was re-imagined in June 2008 and again in August 2017. It is a member of the City and Regional Magazine Association (CRMA).

Previous owners of the publication include Emmis Publishing, which acquired it in July 2007.
