= California Home + Design =

American media brand

- Editorial + Brand Director: Lindsey Shook
- Categories: Architecture, Art, Interior Design and Travel
- Format: Online
- Publisher: Ali Grosslight
- Founder: Sloane Citron and Elsie Floriani
- Final issue: Currently In Print
- Company: CHD Media, Inc.
- Country: United States
- Language: English
- Website: www.californiahomedesign.com
- ISSN: 1545-7915

California Home+Design is a United States multi-platform media brand that covers home, architecture, products, art and lifestyle stories throughout the state of California. California Home+Design magazine is distributed quarterly. The audience for California Home + Design extends from Sacramento to San Diego and exceeds 600,000.

California Home+Design was founded in the mid-1990s by Sloane Citron and Elsie Floriani of 18media under the name of California Home & Gardens. In 2004 McEvoy Media, then Hartle Media, acquired a majority interest in the publication and changed the name to California Home+Design and californiahomedesign.com. This act was later followed by the acquisition of Spin magazine by McEvoy Media. McEvoy Media also produced 7x7 magazine and is a part of the McEvoy Group which also own publishing house Chronicle Books.

In 2014, McEvoy shut down the brand and sold it to a former staff member for a relaunch.
