= Regie's Rainbow Adventure =

Children's nutrition and physical activity program

Regie's Rainbow Adventure is the National Kidney Foundation of Michigan's (NFKM) nutrition and physical activity program aimed at children in early childcare settings throughout the state of Michigan. Regie, the broccoli superhero, travels to different islands that correspond with the colors of the rainbow and learns about the importance of eating fruits and vegetables and being physically active to encourage children to make healthier choices.

== History ==
In 2006, the East Central Diabetes Outreach Network and the NKFM developed the first iteration of Regie's Rainbow Adventure, titled "Eat A Rainbow". The program served as a one-hour lesson plan for YMCA of Greater Flint's spring-break day camp participants in 2006. Over 200 children participated in the 2006-2007 program.

In 2010, the NKFM officially registered the trademark for Regie's Rainbow Adventure with the United States Patent and Trademark Office and in 2012, the materials of the program were officially copyrighted by the United States Copyright Office.

In 2011, the NKFM received a five-year Social Innovation Fund (SIF) sub-grant from United Way for Southeastern Michigan to improve children's readiness for kindergarten. More than 2,000 children in Head Start classrooms benefited from the program in its early years.

In 2018, the NKFM hired EarlyWorks for a national marketing strategy targeting key decision makers and stakeholders across the early childhood education spectrum — government-funded programs, school districts, and private and in-home providers.

As of 2019, the program has grown to reach 20,000 Michigan youth annually.

== Program and impact ==
Regie's Rainbow Adventure was designed and created for children between the ages of two and five. It is an eight-session program that pairs healthy fruits and vegetables with colors of the rainbow for children to taste on various themed "islands". Children share in meeting Regie's fruit and vegetable friends and see him earn his power stripes by eating healthy and being physically active. Through interactive stories, creative activities, sampling new fruits and vegetables, and bringing healthy information home to share with their families, children are empowered to make healthier life choices.

While the curriculum mainly discusses nutrition, it reinforces tenets of physical health, oral health, literacy, language development, science, art, and social skills using interactive books developed by the NKFM. The program is aligned with the Michigan Great Start to Quality, MDE Early Childhood Standards of Quality, National Association for the Education of Young Children requirements, Head Start Child Development and Early Learning Frameworks.

Since being introduced in 2006, the program has been successfully implemented by over 600 organizations, including local Head Starts, daycares, preschools, and libraries.

In 2017, as a part of the SIF through United Way for Southeastern Michigan, the NKFM published Regie's Rainbow Adventure: National Kidney Foundation of Michigan's nutrition education program for disease prevention in the early childcare setting. The NKFM was also awarded a two-year grant by the Michigan Health Endowment Fund. The grant 2017 Nutrition and Healthy Lifestyles will provide funds to support the PEACH program (Project for Early Childhood Health).

By 2018, 11 Genesee County preschools or daycare centers participated in Regie's Rainbow Adventure. Since children in the county began the program, over 93% of parents reported an increase in their children's ability to identify and consumption of more fruits and vegetables, along with an increase in physical activity.
