= Golden Coast =

Golden Coast may refer to:

- Coastal California
  - Golden Coast Conference, collegiate women's water polo conference
- Costa Daurada, an area on the coast of Catalonia, Spain
- Côte-d'Or, a department of France; translation meaning Golden Coast
- Golden Coast (album), an album by Flow
- Golden Coast, a video by John-Allison Weiss

== See also ==
- Gold Coast (disambiguation)
