= 7x7 (magazine) =

San Francisco-focused fashion, food, and entertainment magazine

- Cover for the December 2013 / January 2014 issue
- Executive Editor: Shoshi Parks
- President: Natalie Wages
- Editor-at-Large: Chloe Hennen
- Categories: city; regional; lifetstyle; culture; food; fashion
- Publisher: Natalie Wages
- Founder: Tom Hartle and Heather Hartle
- Founded: 2001
- Final issue: March 2015 (print)
- Company: 7x7 Bay Area, Inc.
- Country: United States
- Based in: San Francisco
- Language: English
- Website: 7x7.com
- ISSN: 1537-758X

7x7 curates content around the San Francisco Bay Area's favorite pastimes, such as food and drink, the arts, travel, style, the great outdoors, and more.

== History and profile ==
7x7 was founded in 2001 by Tom Hartle and Heather Hartle, who had just moved from Detroit. The name, pronounced "seven-by-seven", originally represented the approximate forty-nine square miles making up the City and County of San Francisco. 7x7 was produced by McEvoy Media, which is owned by the McEvoy Group.

In 2004, McEvoy Media, then Hartle Media, acquired a majority interest in California Home + Design and californiahomedesign.com. In 2006, it was involved in the purchase of Spin by the McEvoy Group, owners of Chronicle Books.

7x7 was acquired by Metropolitan Media in 2014, and later acquired by its current owner, 7x7 Bay Area, Inc. 'It ceased print publication with its March 2015 issue and refocused its efforts on its digital platforms.

== See also ==
- David Weir, 7x7's founding editor
- San Francisco magazine
