= Côte d'Or =

Côte d'Or can refer to:

- Côte-d'Or, French department
- Côte d'Or (chocolate) Belgian chocolate brand owned by Mondelēz International
- Côte d'Or (escarpment), geographical feature and wine-producing area in Côte-d'Or
- Côte d'Or FC, an association football club in Praslin, Seychelles
- Le Relais Bernard Loiseau, formerly La Côte d'Or, French restaurant in Saulieu, Côte-d'Or
- French ship Océan (1790), renamed Côte d'Or in 1793

== See also ==
- Gold Coast (disambiguation)
