= National Kidney Foundation of Michigan =

Not-for-profit organization and subset of the National Kidney Foundation, USA

The National Kidney Foundation of Michigan (NKFM) is a 501(c)(3) not-for-profit organization and subset of the National Kidney Foundation, a major voluntary health organization in the United States. Since 1955, the NKFM has carried out a mission to prevent kidney disease and improve the quality of life for those living with it. The nonprofit is based in Ann Arbor and has three additional statewide branches in Flint, Grand Rapids and Detroit. The charity has received 11 consecutive 4-star ratings from Charity Navigator, the nation's leading charity evaluator.

== History and Mission ==
The NKFM was established as an affiliate of the National Kidney Foundation in 1955. Its mission is: “To prevent kidney disease and improve the quality of life for those living with it.” Through legislative and program-based efforts, the organization seeks to prevent three major causes of kidney disease including obesity, diabetes, and hypertension. The NKFM is the largest affiliate of the National Kidney Foundation and offers more programs and services to more people than any other region or state.

In 2016, the Detroit branch opened a new office in the Henry Ford Medical Center - Detroit Northwest from a smaller office based in Detroit. In 2018, the Grand Rapids branch relocated their office to a larger space owned by the Breton Associates.

In 2017, the charity spent over $5.5 million, with 86.7% of program expenses directed toward public education, 3.7% toward patient services, and 5.3% toward community services.

== Education Outreach ==
Each year, the organization spends a significant portion of their program expenses on education and educational initiatives. In 2017, 86.7% of their expenses were directed toward public education. The NKFM has directed educational outreach initiatives and programs surrounding topics such as chronic kidney disease, diabetes prevention, nutrition education for children, general physical activity, and gestational diabetes.

Since 2012, the Diabetes Prevention Program (DPP) has served more than 1,550 people by encouraging an active lifestyle and educating them about prevention of diabetes through nutrition. Through lifestyle changes, clients have lost, on average, 6 percent of their body weight and have been physically active for an average of almost 190 minutes per week. The program starts with 16 weekly meetings, during which participants learn healthy nutrition practices. For the rest of the year, the class meets monthly.

Starting in 2016, the NKFM's Diabetes Prevention Program pre-diabetes class was one of five diabetes prevention programs in Michigan that was approved and covered by Medicare.

In 2017, the NKFM published a new book, titled “Regie’s Rainbow Adventure: National Kidney Foundation of Michigan’s nutrition education program for disease prevention in the early childcare setting.” The book features Regie, a broccoli superhero, who acts as the face for the Regie program that served 24,000 children in Southeast Michigan in nutrition and physical activity education.

During the early stages of 2018, roughly 1,200 adults 50 and older attended health workshops sponsored by the NKFM NKFM including the Diabetes Prevention Program (DPP), Personal Action toward Health (PATH) and Diabetes PATH.

== Projects and Activities ==
The organization's activities focus on awareness, prevention and treatment. Initiatives include public and professional education, kidney health screenings, research, and patient services. According to the group, almost 90% of fundraising dollars goes into programs and services aimed at preventing kidney disease.

The NKFM hosts several fundraising events each year including Kidney Walks and two Kidney Balls held in Detroit and Grand Rapids.

In December 2018, the event raised over $420,000 through a silent auction, live auction and donations at the Westin Book Cadillac Detroit.

Since 1976, the NKFM has hosted an annual Kids Camp in Fenton, Michigan at Camp Copneconic. During a traditional weekly camp session, the NKFM provides medical support necessary to allow kids with kidney disease ages 8–16 to attend the camp alongside other campers. The foundation enlists a team of Michigan-based nurses and doctors to assist the roughly 30 campers throughout the week. The foundation also provides financial support for children interested in attending the camp. The children are all kidney patients and come from one of three hospitals in the state — Children's Hospital at the DMC in Detroit, C.S. Mott Children's Hospital in Ann Arbor and the Helen DeVos Children's Hospital in Grand Rapids. Nearly 950 children attended the camp as of 2016.

== Governance ==
Dan Carney served as the president and CEO of the NKFM for over 30 years until 2017, when he was succeeded by Linda Smith-Wheelock. Smith-Wheelock served as the nonprofit's Chief Operating Officer for 17 years before being awarded the position, which she still holds. Carney remains on the board of directors after stepping down into a new role as President and CEO Emeritus.

== Awards ==
Every year since 2006, the NKFM has received 4-star ratings from Charity Navigator, who named the NKFM the number 1 charity in the category of Diseases, Disorders & Disciplines in 2014. The same year, the Huffington Post named the NKFM as one of the top 11 charities that changed the world.

In 2015, the Michigan Association of Health Plans recognized NKFM for “Business Practice Improvement” through their diabetes prevention program during the 15th Annual Pinnacle Awards.

In 2015, the organization was awarded a $20,000 “Foundation Champions for Healthy Kids” grant from the Academy of Nutrition and Dietetics. The grant aimed to improve children's health and wellness by working to prevent or delay the onset of preventable diseases through the implementation of the Project for EArly Childhood Health (PEACH) program in southeast Michigan.
