= Renal Physicians Association =

American nephrology association

- Company type: Non-Profit Organization
- Industry: Healthcare
- Founded: 1973
- Headquarters: Rockville, Maryland, United States
- Website: renalmd.org

The Renal Physicians Association (RPA) is an association representing nephrology professionals in the United States. RPA was founded in 1973 and headquartered in Rockville, Maryland. Their members are committed to improving the care of patients with chronic kidney disease (CKD) and related disorders.

RPA educates policymakers about issues that affect both patients and nephrology practices. They also work with the Centers for Medicare & Medicaid Services (CMS) on regulatory policies.
