= Golden Beach, Maryland =

- CDP
- Location of Golden Beach, Maryland
- Coordinates: 38°29′26″N 76°41′23″W
- Country: United States
- State: Maryland
- County: St. Mary's

Area
  - Total: 4.65 sq mi (12.05 km^{2})
  - Land: 3.79 sq mi (9.82 km^{2})
  - Water: 0.86 sq mi (2.24 km^{2})
- Elevation: 13 ft (4 m)

Population (2020)
  - Total: 3,651
  - Density: 963.1/sq mi (371.84/km^{2})
- Time zone: UTC−5 (Eastern (EST))
  - Summer (DST): UTC−4 (EDT)
- FIPS code: 24-33850
- GNIS feature ID: 0594723

Golden Beach is an upscale census-designated place (CDP) in St. Mary's County, Maryland, United States. The population was 3,796 at the 2010 census. It consists of a small housing development with a private beach, located within the larger postal designation of Mechanicsville. One former resident was popular 1960s romantic recording artist Ronnie Dove.

== Colonial history ==
A 50-acre portion of the area now named Golden Beach was a plantation called "The Fishing Place" which was awarded to Thomas Lamar in 1677 (because spelling varied in those days, in the grant he is called "LaMare"). It was one of several plantations eventually owned by Lamar but he considered it his favorite as it was his primary residence.

The original survey of one of Lamar's parcels at Trent Creek was carried out in 1676.

A grant of land is recorded in the Maryland archives and reads:

"Charles, Absolute Lord and Proprietary of the province of Maryland and Avalon Lord Baron of Baltimore, &c. To all persons to whom these presents shall come, Greetings in our Lord God Everlasting. Know ye that we for and in consideration that Thomas LaMare of Calvert County in our said province of Maryland hath due unto him fifty acres of land within our Province ...upon such conditions and terms as are expressed in the Conditions of Plantation of our late father Cecelius of noble memory under his greater seal at Arms bearing date at London the second day of July of our Lord 1649... Do hereby grant unto him the said Thomas LaMare all the parcel of land called The Fishing Place situate lying and being in Calvert County on the West side of Patuxent River and North side of Trent Creek...To have and to hold the same unto him the said Thomas La Mare, his heirs and assigns forever-to be holden of us and our heirs at our receipt of St. Marries at the two most usual feasts of the year, viz: at the feast of the Annunciation of the Blessed Virgin Mary and the feast of St. Michael the Arch Angel by even and equal portions the Rent of two Shilling Sterling in Silver or Gold. Given at our city of St. Marries under the great seal of our said Province of Maryland the fifth day of April in the second year of our dominion over our said Province Annoque Dam.... One Thousand Six hundred seventy seven."

== Demographics ==
Historical population
Census	Pop.	Note	%±
2020	3,651		—
U.S. Decennial Census

=== 2020 census ===
As of the 2020 census, Golden Beach had a population of 3,651. The median age was 40.1 years. 22.7% of residents were under the age of 18 and 16.1% of residents were 65 years of age or older. For every 100 females there were 101.0 males, and for every 100 females age 18 and over there were 101.4 males age 18 and over.

0.0% of residents lived in urban areas, while 100.0% lived in rural areas.

There were 1,337 households in Golden Beach, of which 31.0% had children under the age of 18 living in them. Of all households, 56.2% were married-couple households, 16.8% were households with a male householder and no spouse or partner present, and 20.6% were households with a female householder and no spouse or partner present. About 21.2% of all households were made up of individuals and 9.5% had someone living alone who was 65 years of age or older.

There were 1,407 housing units, of which 5.0% were vacant. The homeowner vacancy rate was 1.1% and the rental vacancy rate was 10.6%.

Racial composition as of the 2020 census
Race	Number	Percent
White	3,152	86.3%
Black or African American	119	3.3%
American Indian and Alaska Native	21	0.6%
Asian	22	0.6%
Native Hawaiian and Other Pacific Islander	2	0.1%
Some other race	36	1.0%
Two or more races	299	8.2%
Hispanic or Latino (of any race)	95	2.6%

=== 2000 census ===
As of the census of 2000, there were 2,665 people, 921 households, and 749 families residing in the CDP. The population density was 1,027.3 inhabitants per square mile (396.6/km^{2}). There were 970 housing units at an average density of 373.9 per square mile (144.4/km^{2}). The racial makeup of the CDP was 94.71% White, 2.40% African American, 0.26% Native American, 0.75% Asian, 0.15% Pacific Islander, 0.30% from other races, and 1.43% from two or more races. Hispanic or Latino of any race were 0.68% of the population.

There were 921 households, out of which 38.7% had children under the age of 18 living with them, 68.1% were married couples living together, 7.7% had a female householder with no husband present, and 18.6% were non-families. 14.1% of all households were made up of individuals, and 4.7% had someone living alone who was 65 years of age or older. The average household size was 2.89 and the average family size was 3.17.

In the CDP, the population was spread out, with 27.8% under the age of 18, 7.2% from 18 to 24, 29.9% from 25 to 44, 27.1% from 45 to 64, and 8.1% who were 65 years of age or older. The median age was 36 years. For every 100 females, there were 103.4 males. For every 100 females age 18 and over, there were 102.8 males.

The median income for a household in the CDP was $64,697, and the median income for a family was $65,655. About 3.6% of families and 3.7% of the population were below the poverty line, including 4.2% of those under age 18 and 3.1% of those age 65 or over.
