= Gold Coast Stadium =

Gold Coast Stadium may refer to:

- Carrara Stadium, an oval ground in the suburb of Carrara, Queensland
- Robina Stadium, a rectangular stadium in the suburb of Robina, Queensland
