= Gold Coast Mail =

Newspaper in Queensland, Australia

- Type: Weekly newspaper
- Owner(s): APN News & Media
- Founded: 1977
- Ceased publication: 22 December 2011
- Headquarters: Gold Coast, Queensland

The Gold Coast Mail was a weekly newspaper serving Australia's Gold Coast region, owned by APN News & Media.

== History ==
The paper dates back to the Gold Coast Hinterlander, first printed in 1977, which was merged with The Tweed Leader in 1988, to become the Gold Coast Mail, which was first published on 10 August 1988.

The newspaper published its last issue on 22 December 2011.

== See also ==
- List of newspapers in Australia
