= Sloane Citron =

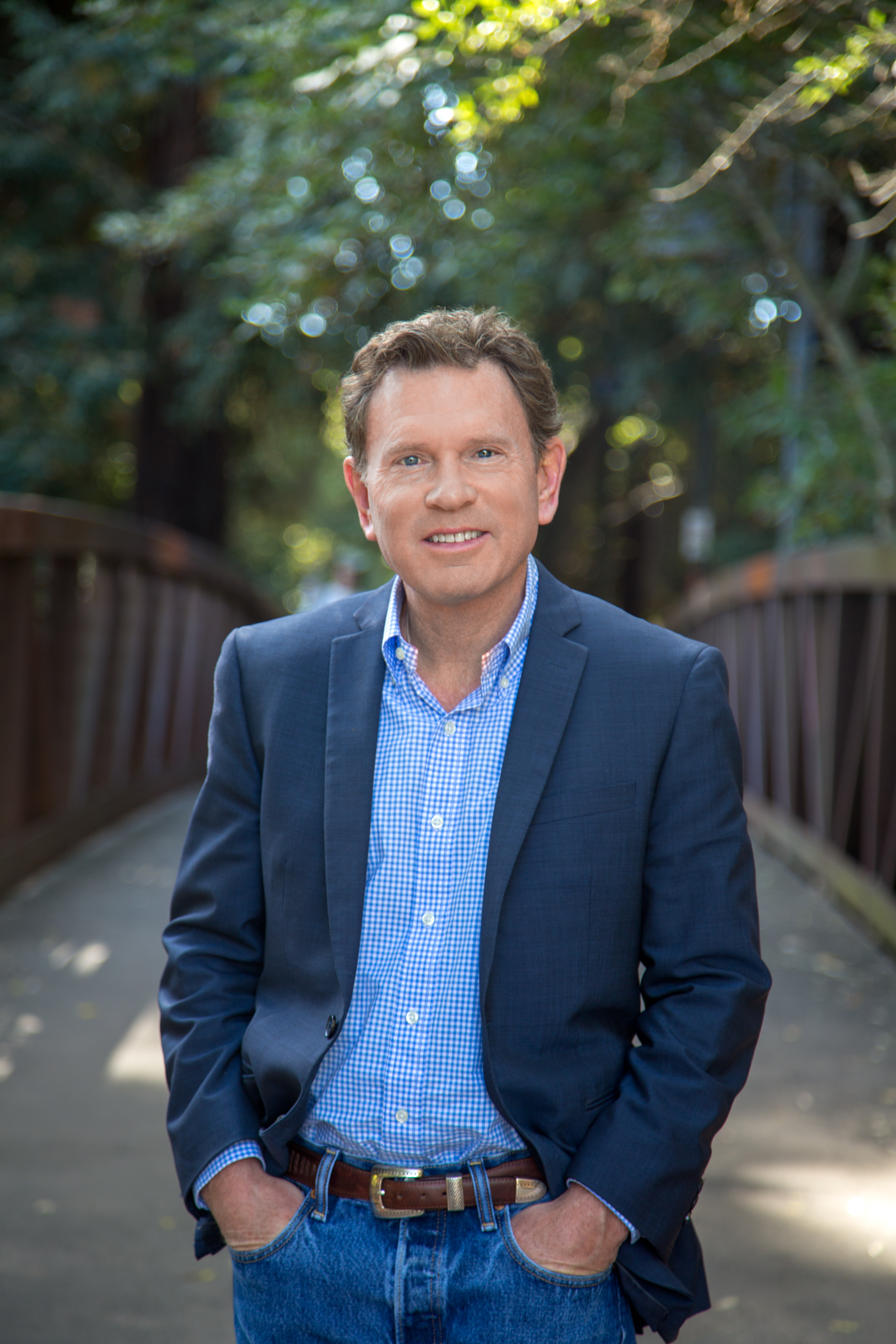
- Sloane Citron in 2018
- Born: February 20, 1956 (age 70)
- Education: Phillips Academy; Claremont McKenna College; Stanford Business School
- Occupation: Publisher
- Years active: 30+ years
- Website: punchmagazine.com

Sloane Citron (born 1956) is an American publisher based in Menlo Park, California. He is known for founding and managing magazines that focus on lifestyle, culture, and the affluent communities of Silicon Valley.

== Early life ==
Citron developed an early passion for publishing. At the age of eight, he launched The Second Grade News, a mimeographed newsletter sold by classmates. During junior high, he became a subscriber to Folio, a magazine industry trade publication. While attending Phillips Academy in Andover, Massachusetts, he founded Muse, a humor magazine modeled after the Harvard Lampoon. Citron graduated from Phillips Academy in 1974 and pursued undergraduate studies at Claremont McKenna College, where he was involved in campus journalism, serving in roles such as publisher of the college newspaper. He later earned a degree from Stanford Graduate School of Business.

== Career ==
Citron began his career in the 1980s as the general manager of Miami Magazine and South Florida Home & Garden. In 1985, he founded Westar Media in Redwood City, California, and launched Peninsula, an upscale regional magazine. Over time, Westar Media expanded its portfolio to include publications such as Northern California Home & Garden and Southern California Home & Garden. In the early 1990s, Citron co-founded 18 Media, introducing distribution models for regional magazines, including "saturation delivery," where magazines were distributed directly to homes in targeted affluent neighborhoods.

Among the notable titles published by 18 Media were Gentry, a luxury lifestyle magazine, and CAFE, which covered Silicon Valley's high-tech culture. In 2018, Citron launched Punch Magazine, a publication focusing on the culture, lifestyle, and communities of the San Francisco Peninsula.

== Publishing philosophy ==
Citron has been a proponent of high-quality print media, emphasizing aesthetics and reader engagement. He has been credited with pioneering business models that reduced reliance on traditional subscription services, instead offering free delivery to targeted audiences. Citron has frequently stated his belief in the enduring value of regional magazines, particularly those that prioritize strong visuals and localized content.

== Personal life ==
Citron resides in Menlo Park, California, with his wife, Judy. They raised four children, all of whom attended local public schools.
