= Gold Coast Historic District =

Gold Coast Historic District can refer to:

- Gold Coast Historic District (Chicago)
- Gold Coast Historic District (Omaha, Nebraska)
- Gold Coast Historic District (Richland, Washington)
