= Hour Detroit =

American monthly magazine

- Hour Detroit cover - October 2013
- Editor-in-chief: Dan Caccavaro
- Former editors: Steve Wilke, Rebecca Powers
- Categories: Local interest magazine
- Frequency: Monthly
- Circulation: 45,000
- Publisher: John Balardo
- Founded: 1996
- Company: Hour Media, Inc.
- Country: USA
- Based in: Troy, Michigan
- Language: English
- Website: www.hourdetroit.com
- ISSN: 1098-9684
- OCLC: 36812180

Hour Detroit is a monthly city magazine covering the Metro Detroit area. The magazine uses a glossy oversized format and features content on restaurants, arts and entertainment, and trends in fashion and décor. It began publication in 1996 and is a member of the City and Regional Magazine Association (CRMA).

== Hour Media ==
Hour Detroit is the flagship publication for Troy, Michigan based Hour Media, LLC. It was founded in 1996 by John Balardo, Tom Hartle, and Stefan Wanczyk.

The company also publishes DBusiness, Detroit Design, Detroit Dining Guide, Michigan Makers, Detroit Health Guide, Metro Detroit Weddings, Metro Detroit Baby and Beyond and Give Detroit. Hour Media's also owns and operates the publications produced under Gemini Media. The publications under that portfolio are Grand Rapids Magazine, Grand Rapids Business Journal, Grand Rapids Baby and Beyond, and Michigan Blue.

In 2005 Hour Media established New York Home, a bimonthly luxury home decor and design magazine. They acquired Absolute magazine, a publication focused on the luxury lifestyles of affluent New Yorkers, in 2006. Both New York Home and Absolute magazine have ceased publication. In 2013, Hour Media acquired Greenspring Media Group, publisher of Minnesota Monthly, from American Public Media Group.

In 2017, Hour Media acquired Atlanta, Cincinnati, Los Angeles, and Orange Coast from Emmis Communications. Hour Media also acquired Palm Beach Illustrated and Naples Illustrated. In 2018, Hour Media acquired Gemini Media, owner of Grand Rapids and Michigan Blue magazines and the Grand Rapids Business Journal. IN 2019, Hour Media acquired Florida Design and Gulfstream Media, whose flagship was Gold Coast.

In 2026, Hour Media acquired Seattle Metropolitan, Portland Monthly, Houstonia, Aspen Sojourner, Vail-Beaver Creek Magazine and Park City Magazine from Sagacity Media, which filed for receivership a year earlier.

== Awards ==
- 2012 FOLIO's Ozzie Award: Best Use of Photography, Consumer Under 100,000 Circulation
- 2009 City and Regional Magazine Association General Excellence Award
- 2004 City and Regional Magazine Association General Excellence Silver Award
