= Gold Coast (magazine) =

- Categories: Regional magazine
- Frequency: Nine per year
- Founder: Yolanda Maurer
- Founded: 1965
- Company: Hour Media
- Country: United States
- Based in: Fort Lauderdale, Florida
- Language: English
- Website: fortlauderdaledaily.com

Gold Coast magazine is a luxury lifestyle magazine covering the Fort Lauderdale, Florida area. It is one of six luxury lifestyle magazines published by Gulfstream Media Group. Gold Coast, which is published nine times a year, is Gulfstream Media Group's flagship publication. The magazine covers a range of topics including politics, business, philanthropy, food, fashion, health, beauty and lifestyle in the city of Fort Lauderdale.

== History ==
Founded in 1965 by Yolanda Maurer, Gold Coast was purchased by its current publisher, Bernard McCormick, in 1970. The magazine was originally published as Fort Lauderdale Pictorial Magazine before the name was changed to Gold Coast.

Bernard McCormick, a senior editor with Philadelphia magazine, bought the magazine in 1970. The 160-page magazine was published nine times a year with an additional summer issue. The magazine eventually expanded its coverage area beyond Fort Lauderdale and Broward County by including feature stories relating to Palm Beach County. As early as 1973, the magazine began to gain readership as far north as Stuart and Vero Beach, where people from South Florida had started to migrate.

In 1994, Bernard McCormick's son, Mark McCormick, left the navy to help his father with the magazine, which had just started producing its first issues as part of Gulfstream Media Group. The company expanded and created other regional magazines, all based out of the Fort Lauderdale office. The company also expanded to include a team in India to assist with the websites and the digital editions for the magazines.

By 2015, Gulfstream Media Group had grown to 22 employees in the United States and 40 in India. The magazine's archives are often used to chronicle the history of South Florida.

In 2019, Gulfstream Media Group was acquired by Hour Media.

== Readership and New Media ==
Gold Coast magazine has a projected annual print readership of 1,700,000 for 2015. The total print, digital and online readership for 2015 is projected to be 15,710,000. Gold Coast magazine's website, FortLauderdaleDaily.com, has a projected readership of 1,500,000. The iPad edition downloads for the 2014–2015 season totaled approximately 19,200.

== Awards ==
=== Florida Magazine Association Charlie Awards, 2018 ===
- Charlie award (first place) for Best In-Depth Reporting: "Heavy Traffic" by Kristen Desmond LeFevre
- Silver award for Best Writing: Public Service Coverage: "A Million Crises" by Ben Wolford
- Bronze award for Best Advertorial: Story or Section: "Women in Business" by Susan Dorta
- Bronze award for Best Writing: Feature Headlines

Society of Professional Journalists Sunshine State Awards, 2018

- First place for Inside Design: Craig Cottrell, "The Gray Area Between Protecting and Profiling," "New to the Neighborhood" and "Healthy Staycations"
- First place for Food and Travel Writing: "Chasing Darwin" by Eric Barton
- First place for Public Service Reporting: "Heavy Traffic" by Kristen Desmond LeFevre
- Second place for Investigative Reporting: "The Gray Area Between Racial Profiling And Policing" by Eric Barton
- Third place for Investigative Reporting: "Heavy Traffic" by Kristen Desmond LeFevre
- Second place for Feature Story: "The Mystery of the Wild Monkeys of Dania" by Eric Barton

INSIDE DESIGN 2015 Sunshine State Awards presented by SPJ Designer Craig Cottrell, "Best Brunch, Nomads, and Open Road"

BEST MEDIA KIT 2015 Charlie Awards presented by the FMA} Graphic Designer Celiese Tuason, "Gold Coast magazine 50th Anniversary Media Kit"

BEST TABLE OF CONTENTS 2015 Charlie Awards presented by the FMA} Designer Craig Cottrell The Gulfstream Media Group staff, "Table of Contents"

BEST OVERALL MAGAZINE 2015 Charlie Awards presented by the FMA} Gulfstream Media Group staff, "The Summer Issue 2014/December 2014 Issue/February 2015 Issue"

BEST OVERALL ONLINE PRESENCE 2015 Charlie Awards presented by the FMA} Gulfstream Media Group Staff, "fortlauderdaledaily.com"

BEST ILLUSTRATION 2014 Charlie Award presented by the FMA} Illustration by Bill Cigliano; Art Direction by Craig Cottrell, Illustration for "Is Jeffrey Loria the Most Hated Man in Baseball?"

BEST ONLINE VIDEO 2014 Charlie Award presented by the FMA } Gold Coast staff, "Gold Coast Foodie Issue"

BEST COLUMN 2012 Charlie Award presented by the FMA } Author Bernard McCormick, "McCormick Place" column

THIRD PLACE 2011 Sunshine State Award presented by the SPJ } Author Bernard McCormick, "King of Hearts" story on Don King • Light Feature Reporting
