= Tennis Gold Coast =

Logo of Tennis Gold Coast

Tennis Gold Coast is the governing body for the sport of tennis in the Gold Coast, Queensland. The organisation is based in Southport, Queensland in Australia. Famous players from the Gold Coast are players such as Samantha Stosur and Bernard Tomic.

== Affiliations ==
Tennis Gold Coast is affiliated with the following organisations:

- Tennis Queensland
- Tennis Australia

== Affiliated Clubs/Centres ==
- Queens Park Tennis Centre
- Bueleigh Heads Tennis Club
- Currumbin Tennis Club
- Gold Coast Albert Junior Tennis Club
- Discovery Park Tennis Club
- Emerald Lakes Tennis Centre
- Pat Cash International Tennis Academy
- Island Tennis Club
- International Tennis Academy GC
- Jacobs Well & District Tennis Assoc
- Labrador Tennis Club
- Miami Tennis Club
- Mudgeeraba Tennis Club
- Nerang Tennis Club
- Ormeau/Pimpama Tennis Club
- Pimpama Island Sports Assoc. Inc
- Pro-one Tennis Academy
- Radisson Resort
- Robina Woods Tennis/Golf Club
- Royal Pines Tennis Centre
- Somerset Tennis
- Sports Mirage
- Tallara Tennis Club
- Tambourine Mountain Tennis Club
- TSS (The Southport School)
- Veterans Tennis Club

== Taylor Byrne Tournaments ==
Taylor Byrne Junior Masters Tournament Logo.

In the 2009 Taylor Byrne Head Junior Masters Tennis Circuit. The top two point scorers in every age group will represent the Gold Coast Region in the Queensland Junior Masters Final in Rockhampton on 24 & 25 October 2006. To be eligible to compete in the State Finals, a player must have played a minimum of five tournaments. There are five sections for boys and girls, 9/Under (round robin format), 11/Under, 13/Under, 15/Under, 17/Under.

=== Circuit Tournaments ===
- 15, 22 February 2009 Beenleigh Tennis Centre
- 8, 15 March 2009 Hope Island Resort Tennis Centre
- 2, 3, 4 May 2009 Pro-One Tennis Academy
- 17, 24 May 2009 Miami Tennis Club
- 12, 19 July 2009 Gold Coast Seniors Tennis Club
- 23, 30 August 2009 GCA Junior Tennis Club
- 30 September/ 1, 2 October 2009 Queens Park Tennis Centre

N.b. the 9/Under section players do not participate in the Junior Master Finals.
