= Portland Monthly =

Magazine published in Portland, Oregon, U.S.

- September 2015
- Editor-in-chief: Fiona McCann
- Categories: City magazine
- Frequency: Quarterly
- Circulation: 41,890 (2024)
- Publisher: Janet Morgan
- First issue: November 2003
- Company: Hour Media
- Country: United States
- Based in: Portland, Oregon
- Language: English
- Website: www.pdxmonthly.com
- ISSN: 1546-2765

Portland Monthly (also referred to as Portland Monthly Magazine) is a quarterly news and general interest magazine which covers food, politics, business, design, events and culture in Portland, Oregon. The magazine was co-founded in 2003 by siblings Nicole and Scott Vogel. Nicole had previously worked for Cendant Corporation and Time Warner, and Scott had been a journalist at The New York Times. Though the magazine had some trouble with funding in its first year, it grew to a stable circulation of 56,000 and by 2006 was the seventh-largest city magazine in the United States. The circulation as of 2024 is 41,890.

The Portland Monthly has received generally positive reception in other new publications, including a mixed review of the magazine's first issue in The Columbian, and subsequent positive reviews in The Oregonian and The Seattle Times. Rachel Dresbeck wrote favorably of the magazine in her 2007 book Insiders' Guide to Portland, Oregon.

== History ==
The magazine was co-founded in 2003 by Nicole Vogel and her brother journalist Scott Vogel, and began as a glossy magazine with a focus on the lifestyle of Portland. Nicole Vogel had previously been a vice president at Cendant Corporation, and had worked at Time Warner for five years and was a vice president at CNN. Scott Vogel had previously worked as a journalist for The New York Times. The niche market focus of the magazine was for "25- to 65-year-olds with household incomes of at least $100,000". Nicole Vogel used Texas Monthly as one of her models for the magazine, which she had read growing up in Texas. Planning and research for the magazine included conducting 200 interviews with residents of Portland, in addition to raising US$40,000 from angel investors.

Nicole Vogel had previously sought out seed capital from investors at the Oregon Entrepreneurs Forum in February 2003, and in total raised less than $1 million from investors. One of the first investors in Portland Monthly was the "Women’s Investors Network", a Portland-based group of women-investors which is part of the Oregon Entrepreneurs' Foundation. A formal gathering was held on September 27, 2003, at the Portland Armory to celebrate the launch of the magazine, and the magazine debuted September 29, 2003. The first issue was 104 pages, and due to initial funding issues the magazine appeared bimonthly for the first year. 40,000 copies were produced for the first issue. The first issue was dedicated to the theme: "Why We Love This Town". The magazine was profitable in its first year and brought in $1 million in revenue.

Scott Vogel served as the magazine's first editor-in-chief, and left Portland Monthly in late 2004 to join The Washington Post. Russ Rymer served as the magazine's editor after Scott Vogel left, but he left in February 2005 to become editor of Mother Jones. After Rymer the magazine went to "employment contracts" for editors. Journalist Louise Lague became the next editor-in-chief of the magazine on April 11, 2005. In 2005 the magazine maintained a staff of 22 in addition to hiring freelancers. In August 2005 the Portland Magazine purchased a local magazine related to weddings, the Portland Bride and Groom, which was founded in 2001. Portland Monthly's style editor Jill Spitznass became the editor of the Portland Bride and Groom. Ted Katauskas, who had formerly worked as managing editor of Portland Magazine, was promoted to the magazine's editor-in-chief in August 2005. Katauskas was the fifth employee of the company.

Circulation of the Portland Monthly in 2005 numbered 56,000, and in 2006 paid circulation was 56,000 with an additional 18,000 to 22,000 sold on newsstands. In February 2006 the magazine was the seventh-largest city magazine in the United States. The magazine has reported on the effects of methamphetamine abuse in Oregon, and Enron's usage of the electric utility in Portland. The magazine maintains a website at www.portlandmonthlymag.com, and includes the first few paragraphs of selected articles on the site. Ted Katauskas was editor of the magazine in 2008. Kelly Montoya became the publisher of the magazine in 2012. The magazine's editor in 2018 was Kelly Clarke. In December 2020, the magazine went quarterly.

In 2024, Brooke Jackson-Glidden was named editor-in-chief. At that time, the publication's circulation was 41,890. In November 2025, SagaCity Media, the company owned by the Vogels which published their magazines, filed for receivership. In March 2026, the company sold its publications, including Portland Monthly, to Hour Media for $1.6 million. Jackson-Glidden and associate editor Alex Frane were then laid off.

== Reception ==
Writing for The Columbian, Angela Allen commented that the first issue of the magazine "shows attitude and literary writing, tosses off lots of names, does a terrific fall culture calendar and digs into a couple of issues, including the Trail Blazers", but was also critical, noting: "Its design is crowded and the type is too small to read for most of us without wearing a pair of 'reader' specs." Tom Boyer of The Seattle Times described the magazine as "a smart mix of reader-friendly features and award-winning journalism". Writing in The Oregonian, Steve Duin commented that he appreciated the lists published in the magazine: "Because I'm addicted to lists – and the bigger the better – the best part of my month is the morning that copy of Portland Monthly lands like a wounded halibut on my desk."

The magazine won three awards in the City and Regional Magazine Association's 20th Annual National City and Regional Magazine Awards in 2005, receiving recognition in Civic Journalism, Excellence in Writing and General Excellence. The magazine was one of three companies nominated by the Oregon Entrepreneurs Forum as a finalist for Working Capital Stage Company of the Year. In her 2007 book Insiders' Guide to Portland, Oregon, author Rachel Dresbeck wrote that the magazine "maintains an excellent calendar" of events going on in the city. In July 2007, Nicole Vogel was a finalist among nominees for an individual entrepreneurship award from the Oregon Entrepreneurs Network.
