= Star Garnet/Terrence Berg =

Terrence Berg may refer to:

- Terrence G. Berg (born 1959), federal judge of the United States District Court for the Eastern District of Michigan
- Terry Berg, fictional character in the DC Comics universe
