= Anna Diggs Taylor =

American judge

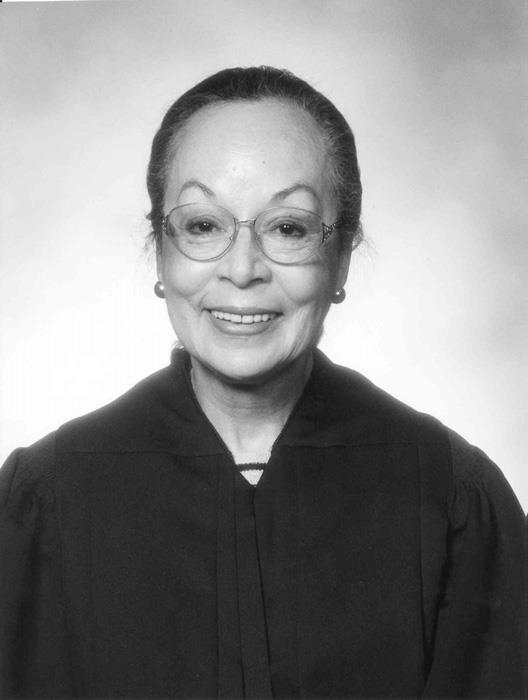

Senior Judge of the United States District Court for the Eastern District of Michigan
- In office December 31, 1998 – November 4, 2017

Chief Judge of the United States District Court for the Eastern District of Michigan
- In office 1996–1998
- Preceded by: Julian Abele Cook Jr.
- Succeeded by: Lawrence Paul Zatkoff

Judge of the United States District Court for the Eastern District of Michigan
- In office November 2, 1979 – December 31, 1998
- Appointed by: Jimmy Carter
- Preceded by: Seat established by 92 Stat. 1629
- Succeeded by: Marianne Battani

Personal details
- Born: Anna Katherine Johnston; December 9, 1932 Washington, D.C. U.S.
- Died: November 4, 2017 (aged 84) Grosse Pointe Woods, Michigan U.S.
- Spouse(s): Charles Diggs (1960-1971; divorced); S. Martin Taylor (m. 1976)
- Education: Barnard College (BA); Yale Law School (LLB)

Anna Katherine Diggs Taylor (née Johnston; December 9, 1932 – November 4, 2017) was a United States district judge of the United States District Court for the Eastern District of Michigan.

== Education and career ==
Born in Washington, D.C. as Anna Katherine Johnston, she earned a Bachelor of Arts degree from Barnard College in 1954. She received a Bachelor of Laws from Yale Law School in 1957. She was an attorney in the Office of Solicitor of the United States Department of Labor in Washington, D.C. from 1957 to 1960. She was an assistant prosecutor in Wayne County, Michigan, from 1961 to 1962. She was an Assistant United States Attorney of the Eastern District of Michigan in Detroit, Michigan, in 1966. She was a legislative assistant and Detroit office manager for United States Representative Charles Diggs from 1967 to 1970. She was in private practice of law in Detroit from 1970 to 1975. She was an adjunct professor at the Wayne State University School of Labor and Industrial Relations from 1972 to 1975. She was the supervising assistant corporation counsel for the City of Detroit Law Department from 1975 to 1979. She was an adjunct professor at Wayne State University Law School from 1976 to 1977.

== Federal judicial service ==
Taylor was nominated by President Jimmy Carter on May 17, 1979, to the United States District Court for the Eastern District of Michigan, to a new seat created by 92 Stat. 1629. She was confirmed by the United States Senate on October 31, 1979, and received her commission on November 2, 1979. She served as Chief Judge from 1996 to 1998. She assumed senior status on December 31, 1998, serving in that status until her death on November 4, 2017, in Grosse Pointe Woods, Michigan, after battling an illness.

== Personal ==
In 1960, Taylor married United States Representative Charles Diggs; they divorced in 1971. In 1976, she married S. Martin Taylor, a regent of the University of Michigan.

== ACLU v. NSA ==
In 2006, Taylor was the first federal judge to rule on the legal and constitutional issues of the NSA warrantless surveillance controversy. Her ruling in ACLU v. NSA held that the domestic wiretapping conducted by the National Security Agency without court approval violates the Foreign Intelligence Surveillance Act and is unconstitutional. She granted a permanent injunction to halt it. The ruling, whose effect was stayed pending appellate proceedings, sparked a vigorous political and legal controversy. She declined to rule on the legality of the alleged NSA call database, on state-secrets grounds. The quality and comprehensiveness of her opinion have been criticized by some legal experts.

The conservative watchdog organization Judicial Watch has alleged that Taylor may have had a conflict of interest in the case, because, according to Judicial Watch, she was secretary and trustee for the Community Foundation for Southeastern Michigan (CFSEM), a group that made a $45,000 grant over two years to the ACLU of Michigan, the plaintiff in ACLU v. NSA in whose favor Taylor ruled. Taylor's ruling was subsequently overturned by the U.S. Circuit Court of Appeals for the Sixth Circuit. By a 2–1 vote, the appellate court held that the plaintiffs lacked standing, and vacated the portion of Taylor's ruling concerning warrantless wiretaps.

== See also ==
- List of African-American federal judges
- List of African-American jurists
- List of first women lawyers and judges in Michigan

Legal offices
Preceded by Seat established by 92 Stat. 1629	Judge of the United States District Court for the Eastern District of Michigan; 1979–1998	Succeeded by Marianne Battani
Preceded by Julian Abele Cook Jr.	Chief Judge of the United States District Court for the Eastern District of Michigan; 1996–1998	Succeeded by Lawrence Paul Zatkoff
