= List of first women lawyers and judges in Michigan =

This is a list of the first women lawyer(s) and judge(s) in Michigan. It includes the year in which the women were admitted to practice law (in parentheses). Also included are women who achieved other distinctions such becoming the first in their state to graduate from law school or become a political figure.

== Firsts in Michigan's history ==
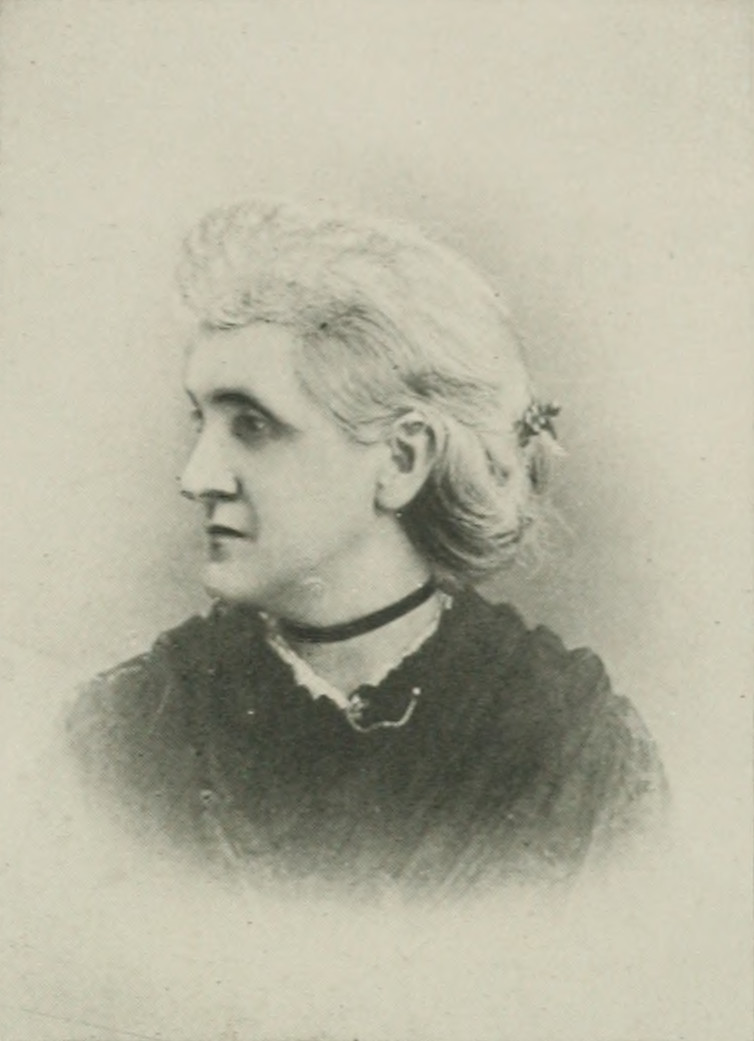
Sarah Killgore Wertman: First female lawyer in Michigan (1871)

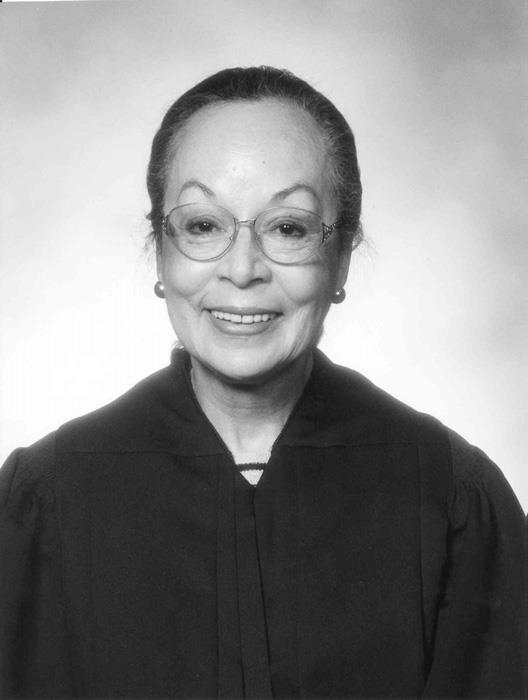
Anna Diggs Taylor: First African American female Judge of the U.S. District Court for the Eastern District of Michigan (1979)

=== Lawyers ===
- First female: Sarah Kilgore Wertman (1871)
- First female to argue a case before the Michigan Supreme Court: Martha Strickland Clark in 1888
- First female (earned LL.M. degree): Theresa Doland (1917)
- First African American female: Grace G. Costavas Murphy (1923)
- First Hispanic American female: Dorothy Comstock Riley (1950)

=== State judges ===
- First African American female: Geraldine Bledsoe Ford (1948) in 1967
- First female (justice of the peace): Phoebe Ely Patterson in 1919
  - In 1921, Patterson's election as justice of the peace was challenged, prompting the Supreme Court of Michigan to confirm Patterson's eligibility for the position. Building on precedent, the Court confirmed that women are eligible to serve as jurors according to the state constitution.
- First female (probate court): Ella Eggleston in 1919
  - Eggleston served for four different judges as the register of the probate court prior to becoming the first woman probate judge in Michigan.
- First female (Michigan Supreme Court): Mary S. Coleman in 1972
- First Hispanic American female (county court judge): Dorothy Comstock Riley in 1972
- First (Hispanic American) female (Michigan Court of Appeals): Dorothy Comstock Riley in 1976
- First female (Michigan Supreme Court; Chief Justice): Mary S. Coleman in 1979
- First Hispanic American female (Michigan Supreme Court): Dorothy Comstock Riley in 1982
- First Hispanic American female: Patricia P. Fresard in 1998
- First African American female (elected; Michigan Court of Appeals): Karen Fort Hood in 2002
- First Muslim American female: Mona K. Majzoub in 2004
- First Arab American (female): Charlene Mekled Elder in 2006
- First Asian American (female): Shalina D. Kumar in 2007
- First African American female (Seventeenth Circuit Court): Christina Elmore in 2019
- First Palestinian American (female): Yvonna Abraham in 2021
- First African American female (Michigan Supreme Court): Kyra Harris Bolden in 2022
- First Hispanic American female (Chief Judge; Third Circuit Court): Patricia P. Fresard in 2022
- First tribal (female) citizen from the Little Traverse Bay Bands of Odawa Indians (Michigan Court of Appeals): Allie Greenleaf Maldonado in 2023
- First Arab American female (Michigan Court of Appeals): Mariam Bazzi in 2025

=== Federal judges ===
- First African American female (U.S. District Court for the Eastern District of Michigan): Anna Diggs Taylor (1957) in 1979
- First openly lesbian female (U.S. District Court for the Eastern District of Michigan): Judith Ellen Levy (1996) in 2014
- First Assyrian American (female) (United States District Court for the Western District of Michigan): Hala Y. Jarbou in 2020
- First South Asian American (female) (U.S. District Court for the Eastern District of Michigan): Shalina D. Kumar in 2021
- First African American female from Michigan (United States Court of Appeals for the Sixth Circuit): Stephanie D. Davis in 2022
- First East Asian American (female) (U.S. District Court for the Eastern District of Michigan): Susan K. DeClercq in 2023

=== Attorney General of Michigan ===
- First female: Jennifer Granholm (c. 1987) from 1993 to 2003
- First openly lesbian female: Dana Nessel in 2018

=== Solicitor General of Michigan ===
- First Muslim Arab American (female): Fadwa Hammoud in 2019

=== United States Attorney ===
- First Muslim American (female): Saima Mohsin in 2021
- First African American female (Eastern District of Michigan): Dawn N. Ison in 2021

=== Assistant United States Attorney ===
- First female: Ella Mae Backus in 1923

=== Judge Advocate General ===
- First female: Rosemarie Aquilina (1984)

=== County Prosecutor ===
- First female: Emelia Christine Schaub in 1936
- First African American female: Kym Worthy in 2004

=== Political Office ===
- First female (Governor of Michigan): Jennifer Granholm (c. 1987) from 2003 to 2011
- First Muslim American female (Michigan Legislature): Rashida Tlaib (c. 2004) from 2009 to 2014

=== Michigan State Bar Association ===
- First female president: Julia Donovan Darlow (1971) in 1986
- First African American female president: Victoria Roberts in 1996

=== Faculty ===
- First female law school dean: Joan Mahoney in 1998

== Firsts in local history ==
- Patricia "Pat" Micklow: First female judge in Upper Michigan (1987)
- Margaret Zuzich Bakker (1978): First female district court judge in Allegan County, Michigan
- Karen Tighe (1976): First female judge in Bay County, Michigan
- Dora Whitney: First female lawyer in Berrien County, Michigan
- Mabel Mayfield: First African American female judge in Berrien County, Michigan (2000)
- Mary Coleman: First female judge in Calhoun County, Michigan
- Tracie Tomak: First female district court judge in Calhoun County, Michigan (2018)
- Susan L. Dobrich: First female to serve as the County Prosecutor for Cass County, Michigan (1984)
- Kerry Zahner: First female Public Defender for Charlevoix County, Michigan
- Elizabeth Church: First female judge in Chippewa County, Michigan
- Michelle Ambrozaitis: First female to serve as the County Prosecutor in Clare County, Michigan (2009)
- Ruth Winegarden Berger: First female lawyer in Genesee County, Michigan
- Elza Papp (1947): First female to serve as the Assistant Prosecutor (1947) and district court judge (1965) in Genesee County, Michigan
- Arthalu "Artie" Lancaster (1968): First female to serve as the President of the Genesee County Bar Association, Michigan (1987-1988)
- Edwyna Goodwin Anderson: First African American female admitted to the Genesee County Bar Association, Michigan (1974)
- Karen McDonald Lopez: First female (and African American female) to serve as the Flint City Attorney in Genesee County, Michigan
- Melanie Stanton (1989): First female judge in Grand Traverse County, Michigan
- Amelia C. Leet (1894): First female lawyer in Gratiot County, Michigan
- Laura Bever: First female prosecutor in Gratiot County, Michigan (2023)
- Carolyn Stell: First female judge in Ingham County, Michigan (1983)
- Carol A. Siemon: First female to serve as the County Prosecutor for Ingram County, Michigan (2016)
- Shauna Dunnings: First female and first African American to serve as a Probate Judge in Ingham County, Michigan (2019)
- Kati Rezmierski: First female to serve as the Chief Assistant Prosecutor for Jackson County, Michigan (2013)
- Kelsey Guernsey: First female elected as the Prosecuting Attorney for Jackson County, Michigan (2025)
- Elizabeth "Bessie" Eaglesfield: First female lawyer in Grand Rapids, Michigan [Kent County, Michigan]
- Carol Irons: First female judge in Kent County, Michigan (1982)
- Kimberly Schaefer: First African American female to serve as a Judge of the 61st District Court in Kent County, Michigan (2008)
- Anita Hitchcock: First African American (female) to serve as the Grand Rapids City Attorney, Kent County, Michigan (2016)
- Susan Sniegowski: First female judge in Mason County and Lake County, Michigan (2014)
- Emelia Christine Schaub: First female to serve as the County Prosecutor for Leelanau County, Michigan (1936)
- Natalia Koselka: First female judge in Lenawee County, Michigan (1982)
- Tamaris Henagan-Sprow (2017): First female lawyer in Adrian, Michigan [Lenawee County, Michigan]
- Suzanne Geddis: First female elected as a district court judge in Livingston County, Michigan (2004)
- Sheila A. Miller (1990): First African American female judge in Macomb County, Michigan (2006)
- Patricia "Pat" Micklow: First female to serve as an assistant prosecutor in Marquette County, Michigan. She was also the first female to serve as a Judge of the 96th District Court for Marquette County, Michigan (1987).
- Jenna Nelson: First female to serve as the Marquette County Prosecutor (2023)
- Susan Sniegowski: First female judge in Mason County and Lake County, Michigan (2014). She was also the first female to serve as the Prosecuting Attorney for Mason County, Michigan (2005).
- Patricia Costello (1950): First female judge in Monroe County, Michigan
- Ruth Thompson (1924): First female lawyer in Muskegon County, Michigan
- Denise Langford Morris: First African American female (and African American in general) circuit court judge in Oakland County, Michigan
- Jessica R. Cooper: First female to serve as the Prosecutor for Oakland County, Michigan (2008)
- Cora VandeWater: First female judge in Ottawa County, Michigan (1933)
- Juanita F. Bocanegra: First Latino American female judge in Ottawa County, Michigan (2020)
- Kathleen M. Brickley: First female judge in Van Buren County, Michigan (2012)
- Judith James Carlson: First female judge in Washtenaw County, Michigan (1984)
- Nancy Cornelia Wheeler (née Francis): First African American female judge in Washtenaw County, Michigan (1990)
- Betty R. Widgeon: First female (and African American female) to serve as a Judge of the 14-A District Court in Washtenaw County, Michigan (1994)
- Martha Strickland Clark (1887): First female lawyer in Detroit, Michigan [Wayne County, Michigan]
- Clara T. Livermore: First female judge in Detroit, Michigan (1914) [Wayne County, Michigan]
- Hazel Harrison: First African American (female) to serve as the Justice of the Peace in Romulus, Wayne County, Michigan (1947)
- Lila Neuenfelt: First female to serve on the Wayne County Circuit Court
- Dorothy Comstock Riley: First Hispanic American female to serve on the Wayne County Circuit Court (1972)
- Marjorie McGovern: First African American female to serve as the Assistant Prosecuting Attorney for Wayne County, Michigan (1961). She was also the first African American female to serve as a referee in the Wayne County Probate Court (1957).
- Lucille Watts: First African American female to serve on the Wayne County Circuit Court (1980)
- Kym Worthy: First female (and African American) to serve as the County Prosecutor for Wayne County, Michigan (2004)
- Laura A. Echartea: First Latino American female (and Latino American in general) to serve as a Judge of the Thirty-Sixth Judicial District (2011) [Wayne County, Michigan]
- Charlene Elder: First Arab American female to serve as a Judge of the Third Circuit Court (2005)
- Yvonna Abraham: First Palestinian American (female) to serve on the Wayne County Third Circuit Court (2021)
- Jelani Jefferson Exum: First African American (female) to serve as the Dean of the University of Detroit Mercy School of Law (2021)

== See also ==
- List of first women lawyers and judges in the United States
- Timeline of women lawyers in the United States
- Women in law

== Other topics of interest ==
- List of first minority male lawyers and judges in the United States
- List of first minority male lawyers and judges in Michigan
