= Jim Townsend (Michigan politician) =

American politician from Michigan

Member of the Michigan House of Representatives from the 26th district
- In office 2011–2017
- Preceded by: Marie Donigan
- Succeeded by: Jim Ellison

Personal details
- Born: 1965/1966
- Party: Democratic
- Spouse: Jennie Townsend
- Children: 2
- Education: University of North Carolina; University of Michigan; Wayne State University
- Profession: Director, Levin Center for Oversight and Democracy
- Website: Official website

Jim Townsend (born 1965/1966) represented the 26th district in the Michigan House of Representatives from January 2011 until January 2017. He is a member of the Democratic Party. He is the director of the Levin Center for Oversight and Democracy in Detroit, Michigan.

== Education ==
Townsend earned a B.A. in History from the University of North Carolina in 1988. He earned a dual MBA/MPP from the University of Michigan in 1997. In 2016, he earned a JD from Wayne State University Law School.

== Career ==
Townsend was first elected to the state house in 2010. In explaining his reelection bid, Townsend stated, "I am running because the promise of a middle class life in Michigan is being broken for too many of our people. We need a state government that will stand up to special interests and invest in the public goods like education that are crucial to creating good-paying jobs for our people."

In 2013, Townsend introduced legislation that called for universal background checks for gun buyers. He has worked for Ford, and helped found the Michigan suburbs alliance.

In November 2019, Townsend was appointed director of the Levin Center for Oversight and Democracy at Wayne State University Law School.
