= Matthew F. Leitman =

American judge (born 1968)

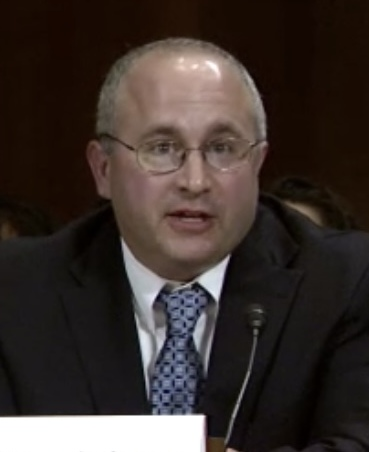
- Letiman in 2013

Judge of the United States District Court for the Eastern District of Michigan
- Incumbent
- Assumed office March 14, 2014
- Appointed by: Barack Obama
- Preceded by: Marianne Battani

Personal details
- Born: 1968 (age 57–58) Detroit, Michigan, U.S.
- Education: University of Michigan (BA); Harvard University (JD)

Matthew Frederick Leitman (born 1968) is a United States district judge of the United States District Court for the Eastern District of Michigan.

== Biography ==
Leitman was born in 1968, in Detroit. He received a Bachelor of Arts summa cum laude, in 1990 from the University of Michigan. He received a Juris Doctor, magna cum laude, in 1993 from Harvard Law School. He served as a law clerk to Justice Charles L. Levin of the Michigan Supreme Court from 1993 to 1994. From 1994 to 2004, he worked at the law firm of Miro Weiner & Kramer P.C. in Bloomfield Hills, Michigan. From 2004 until his move to the federal bench, he served as a principal at the law firm of Miller Canfield P.L.C. in Troy, Michigan, where he handled complex commercial litigation, criminal defense, and appellate matters before both state and federal courts.

=== Federal judicial service ===
On July 25, 2013, President Barack Obama nominated Leitman to serve as a United States district judge of the United States District Court for the Eastern District of Michigan, to the seat vacated by Judge Marianne Battani, who assumed senior status on June 10, 2012. On January 16, 2014, his nomination was reported out of committee by a voice vote. On March 11, 2014, the United States Senate invoked cloture on his nomination by a 55–43 vote. On March 12, 2014, his nomination was confirmed by a 98–0 vote. He received his judicial commission on March 14, 2014.

==== John Conyers ballot qualification dispute ====
On May 23, 2014, Leitman ruled that Congressman John Conyers (D-MI 13th) could remain on the election ballot despite a dispute over the validity of signatures on his nominating petition. Michigan election law requires at least 1,000 signatures of registered voters for a candidate to be included on a ballot; Conyers submitted 2,000 signatures, but most were ruled invalid by a county judge on the grounds that they were not collected by registered voters as required by law. The constitutionality of this signature-gathering requirement was challenged in a lawsuit by the American Civil Liberties Union, and Leitman issued an injunction ordering that Conyers be put back on the ballot, finding that plaintiffs "have shown a substantial likelihood of success" and "time is of the essence".

Legal offices
Preceded by Marianne Battani	Judge of the United States District Court for the Eastern District of Michigan; 2014–present	Incumbent
