= Marie Donigan =

American politician from Michigan

Member of the Michigan House of Representatives from the 26th district
- In office January 1, 2005 – January 1, 2011
- Preceded by: Dave Woodward
- Succeeded by: Jim Townsend

Personal details
- Born: June 17, 1954 (age 72) Royal Oak, Michigan, U.S.
- Party: Democratic
- Education: Western Michigan University (BS); University of Pennsylvania (MS)

Marie Donigan (born June 17, 1954) is an American politician and architect who served as a member of the Michigan State House of Representatives for the 26th District from January 1, 2005, to January 1, 2011.

== Early life and education ==
Donigan was born in Royal Oak, Michigan and attended Dondero High School. She earned a B.S. from Western Michigan University and a M.S. in Landscape Architecture from the University of Pennsylvania.

== Career ==
Donigan worked in private practice as a landscape architect for a number of years, before joining the Farmington Hills Department of Planning.

She was elected to the Royal Oak City Commission in 1997, and served until 2004, when she resigned in order to serve as State Representative. She defeated Republican City Commissioner Carlo P. Ginotti. She was re-elected in 2006, defeating Republican Kevin Konczal, and again reelected in 2008.

The chief focus of her legislative work in the Michigan House has been in the areas of education, health care, public transit and the economy. She was the author of a bill to build a Public Transportation system for the Metro Detroit Area along the Woodward Avenue Corridor.

After Donigan left office due to term limits, she began working as a non-profit executive.

== Personal life ==
She is married to Kevin McLogan, who was the a trustee of the Royal Oak School Board from 1997 to 2009.

=== Election results ===
Michigan House 26th District Election Results, 2004–present
2004 Candidate	Party	Popular votes	Vote percentage
Marie Donigan	Democrat	22,780	52.08%
Carlo Ginotti	Republican	20,954	47.91%
2006 Candidate	Party	Popular votes	Vote percentage
Marie Donigan	Democrat	22,077	62%
Kevin Konczal	Republican	12,357	35%
James Young	Libertarian	1,057	3%
