= Jim Ellison (Michigan politician) =

American politician from Michigan

Member of the Michigan House of Representatives from the 26th district
- In office January 1, 2017 – December 31, 2022
- Preceded by: Jim Townsend
- Succeeded by: Dylan Wegela

Mayor of Royal Oak, Michigan
- In office 2003 – December 31, 2016
- Preceded by: William Urich
- Succeeded by: Michael Fournier

Personal details
- Born: January 7, 1952 (age 74) Royal Oak, Michigan
- Party: Democratic
- Spouse: Jodie
- Children: 8

Jim Ellison (born January 7, 1952) is an American politician who served as a member of the Michigan House of Representatives from 2017-2022. He is a member of the Democratic Party. He now serves as Oakland County's Chief of Older Adult Services, a position introduced in 2023.

== Early career ==
Ellison started his career as a construction cost estimator with Ronnisch Construction Group and Barton Malow Company, with the latter being where he spent most of his career. He also worked in business development at Royal Oak Storage.

Ellison held a number of elected offices before joining the state legislature. He was a commissioner for the City of Royal Oak from 1991-1995. He was also the longest-serving mayor of Royal Oak, Michigan, holding office from 2003-2016, when he left to join the Michigan House of Representatives.

== State legislature ==
Ellison vacated his position as mayor of Royal Oak in 2016 to take his seat in the state legislature, which he held through 2022.

=== Michigan House of Representatives ===
==== Committee assignments ====
- Families, Children, and Seniors
- Health Policy
- Tax Policy
- Local Government

== Electoral history ==
Michigan House of Representatives District 26 Election, 2016
Party	Candidate	Votes	%	±%
Democratic	Jim Ellison	26,785	59.37	N/A
Republican	Randy LeVasseur	18,333	40.63	N/A
Majority				N/A
Democratic hold		Swing		

Michigan House of Representatives District 26 Election, 2018
Party	Candidate	Votes	%	±%
Democratic	Jim Ellison	27,962	68.51	N/A
Republican	Al Gui	12,853	31.49	N/A
Majority				N/A
Democratic hold		Swing		

Michigan House of Representatives District 26 Election, 2020
Party	Candidate	Votes	%	±%
Democratic	Jim Ellison	33,208	63.66	N/A
Republican	Chris Meister	18,955	36.34	N/A
Majority				N/A
Democratic hold		Swing		

== Personal life ==
He resides in Royal Oak with his wife, Jodie, the manager of the Royal Oak Animal Shelter. He has seven children - Emilie, Brian, Bradley, Sarah, Jonathan, Jacob, Isaac - and 13 grandchildren. Ellison was the founding chairman of the Woodward Dream Cruise, and uses his free time to work on a classic 1955 Ford Centerline. He also enjoys spending time with his dogs, cats, rabbits, pig and Canadian goose.
