= Sarah Killgore Wertman =

American lawyer

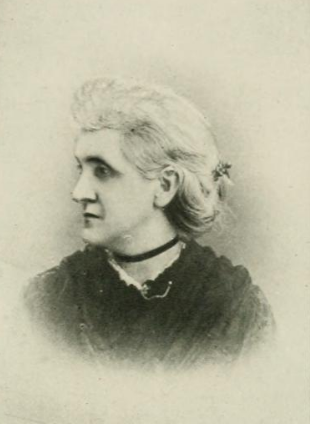
- Born: Sarah Killgore; March 1, 1843; Jefferson, Indiana
- Died: May 21, 1935 (aged 92); Seattle, Washington
- Occupation: Lawyer

Sarah Killgore Wertman, née Killgore (1 March 1843, Jefferson, Indiana - 21 May 1935, Seattle, Washington) was an American lawyer. She was the first woman to both graduate from law school and be admitted to the bar of any state in the United States, after graduating from the University of Michigan Law School and being admitted to the State Bar of Michigan in 1871.

== Life ==
Killgore Wertman was born in Jefferson, Clinton County, Indiana on March 1, 1843 to David and Elizabeth Killgore. Killgore's father was a prominent local attorney and encouraged his daughter's study of the law. Her religious upbringing led Killgore to attend seminary school, graduating from Ladoga Seminary in Ladoga, Indiana in 1862. She then worked for a number of years as a school teacher.

She began studying law at Chicago University (now the University of Chicago) in 1869, and went on to study law at the University of Michigan Law School, becoming the first female law student in the School's history. Killgore Wertman graduated from the University with an LL.B. in March 1871. Later that year she was admitted to the Michigan State Bar. However, she became very ill and had to move home to Indiana.

On June 16, 1875 she married Jackson S. Wertman, an Indianapolis attorney, and the pair moved to Indiana and opened a joint practice there. Under Indiana law, however, women were not eligible for admission to the bar, and so she handled the practice's real estate matters as well as office tasks, while her husband made court appearances.

In November 1878, the couple moved to Ashland, Ohio and Killgore Wertman temporarily retired from law practice in order to raise the couple's children, Shields K., Helen M., and Clay (who died in infancy). When her children were older, she decided to sit for the Ohio Bar examination. She passed in September 1893. Once admitted to the Ohio Bar, Killgore Wertman returned to her husband's law practice, specializing in real estate law and abstracting. Killgore Wertman and her husband later followed their children to Washington state, settling in Seattle, where she continued to reside with her son until her death on May 21, 1935.

She was involved in University of Michigan alumni groups and was a lifelong member of the Equity Club, an organization of women lawyers based at the University of Michigan who exchanged letters.

== See also ==
- List of first women lawyers and judges in Michigan
