= Steven Winter (legal scholar) =

Law professor

Professor Steven Winter
- Title: Walter S. Gibbs Professor of Constitutional Law

Academic background
- Education: Yeshiva University; Columbia Law School

Academic work
- Institutions: Wayne State University Law School; University of Miami School of Law; Brooklyn Law School

Steven Winter is a law professor. He is the Walter S. Gibbs Professor of Constitutional Law at Wayne State University Law School. In 2017 he was promoted to distinguished professor.

== Biography ==
Winter attended the Yeshiva University High School for Boys from 1966 to 1970. Winter attended Yeshiva University and Columbia Law School. From 1986 to 1997 he taught at the University of Miami School of Law, and from 1997 to 2002 he taught at Brooklyn Law School. He began teaching at Wayne State University Law School in 2002 as the Walter S. Gibbs Professor of Constitutional Law. In 2017 he was promoted to distinguished professor.
