= Julian A. Cook =

American judge (1930–2017)

Julian Abele Cook Jr.
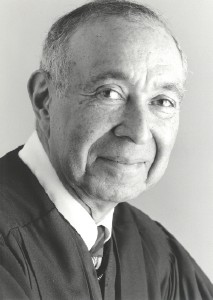

Senior Judge of the United States District Court for the Eastern District of Michigan
- In office December 30, 1996 – May 16, 2017

Chief Judge of the United States District Court for the Eastern District of Michigan
- In office 1989–1996
- Preceded by: James Paul Churchill
- Succeeded by: Anna Diggs Taylor

Judge of the United States District Court for the Eastern District of Michigan
- In office September 23, 1978 – December 30, 1996
- Appointed by: Jimmy Carter
- Preceded by: Lawrence Gubow
- Succeeded by: Arthur Tarnow

Personal details
- Born: Julian Abele Cook Jr. June 22, 1930 Washington, D.C., U.S.
- Died: May 16, 2017 (aged 86) Silver Spring, Maryland, U.S.
- Party: Democratic
- Education: Pennsylvania State University (BA); Georgetown University Law Center (JD)

Julian Abele Cook Jr. (June 22, 1930 – May 16, 2017) was a United States district judge of the United States District Court for the Eastern District of Michigan.

== Education and career ==
Born in Washington, D.C., Cook was the son and only child of African-American architect Julian Abele Cook Sr. and Ruth McNeil.

Cook received a Bachelor of Arts degree from Pennsylvania State University in 1952. He served as officer in the signal corps of the United States Army from 1952 to 1954. He received a Juris Doctor from Georgetown University Law Center in 1957. He was a law clerk for Judge Arthur E. Moore in Pontiac, Michigan from 1957 to 1958. He was in private practice in Detroit, Michigan from 1958 to 1961, and in Pontiac and Bloomfield Hills, Michigan from 1961 to 1978. He was a Special Assistant State Attorney General of Michigan from 1968 until his appointment to the federal bench in 1978.

== Federal judicial service ==
On July 25, 1978, President Jimmy Carter nominated Cook to a seat vacated by Judge Lawrence Gubow on the United States District Court for the Eastern District of Michigan. Cook was confirmed by the United States Senate on September 22, 1978, and received his commission on September 23, 1978. He served as Chief Judge from 1989 to 1996. He assumed senior status on December 30, 1996, serving in that status until his death.

== Death ==
Cook died in his home in Silver Spring, Maryland on May 16, 2017.

== See also ==
- List of African-American federal judges
- List of African-American jurists

== Sources ==
Legal offices
| Preceded by Lawrence Gubow | Judge of the United States District Court for the Eastern District of Michigan; 1978–1996 | Succeeded by Arthur Tarnow |
| Preceded by James Paul Churchill | Chief Judge of the United States District Court for the Eastern District of Michigan; 1989–1996 | Succeeded by Anna Diggs Taylor |
