= Levin Center for Oversight and Democracy =

Non-profit, nonpartisan organization promoting effective bipartisan government oversight

- Formation: 2015
- Founder: Senator Carl Levin
- Purpose: Government oversight and civil discourse
- Location: United States of America
- Director: Jim Townsend
- Website: www.levin-center.org

The Carl Levin Center for Oversight and Democracy is a nonpartisan organization within Wayne State University Law School in Detroit, Michigan, working to improve the ability of "legislative bodies at all levels – federal, state, and abroad – to expose public and private sector abuses, ensure effective governance, and bring critical facts to light for the benefit of all." The Levin Center was founded by former U.S. Senator Carl Levin to promote bipartisan, fact-based oversight investigative techniques.

== History ==
The Levin Center was founded in 2015, at Wayne State University Law School by former U.S. Senator Carl Levin and his long-time staff members Elise Bean and Linda Gustitus. The center has offices in Detroit, Michigan, and Washington, D.C., and focuses on training legislators and staff, promoting scholarship and academic programming, and hosting conferences on important issues in oversight.

Jocelyn Benson, then dean of Wayne State University Law School, served as the first director of the Levin Center from September 2016 to August 2017. She was succeeded by Robert Ackerman, who led the center until November 2019, at which time its current director, Jim Townsend, assumed the role.

The Levin Center at Wayne Law changed its name to the Carl Levin Center for Oversight and Democracy in April 2022.

== Funding ==
The Levin Center receives financial support for its endowment and operations from a wide variety of sources including: individuals, family foundations, national and regional charitable foundations, the U.S. Department of Education, and Wayne State University.

== Oversight Training ==
The Levin Center provides training to improve bipartisan, fact-based, effective oversight by legislative bodies.

=== National ===
The Levin Center, along with the Project on Government Oversight (POGO) and the Lugar Center, holds Oversight Boot Camps for congressional staff in Washington, D.C. These two-day training sessions teach staff members from the U.S. House and Senate, from both democrat and republican offices, how to conduct bipartisan, fact-based oversight investigations. The first boot camp was held in August 2015. In 2019, the Levin Center also began offering Clerk Workshops for administrative personnel who support congressional oversight investigations.

The Levin Center began offering online tutorials in 2017. The website includes short videos on topics related to fact-finding, bipartisan techniques, writing investigative reports, holding hearings, and finding solutions.

The Levin Center has provided testimony at congressional hearings on oversight, including the House Judiciary Subcommittee on Courts and House Select Committee on the Modernization of Congress. In addition, it has developed a series of Portraits in Oversight describing notable congressional investigations, and also tracks important cases in the federal courts litigating oversight issues.

=== State ===
The Levin Center offers workshops for state legislators and their staffs on how to conduct bipartisan, fact-based oversight investigations. The center has conducted workshops, for example, in California, Michigan, Nebraska, North Carolina, and Pennsylvania. It has also led workshops and presentations at meetings of the National Council of Insurance Legislators, National Conference of State Legislatures, and Council of State Governments West. In addition, the Levin Center has offered online webinars addressing specific oversight skills.

In 2018, the Levin Center sponsored a comprehensive study on the oversight capabilities and mechanisms in the 50 state legislatures. It has also sponsored research on other state-level oversight topics. In addition, the Levin Center has provided testimony to some state legislatures regarding their current oversight capabilities and recommended improvements. In March 2023, it launched the State Oversight Academy to further focus on state-level oversight.

=== International ===
In December 2015, the Levin Center partnered with the Anti-Corruption Action Center to conduct an oversight workshop in Kyiv, Ukraine, with Ukrainian Parliamentary staffers. In October 2016, Center staff travelled to Brussels, Belgium to hold a two-day training workshop for a European Parliamentary investigative committee. In 2021, the Levin Center provided online training on two occasions to European Parliamentary staff.

=== Students ===
The Levin Center has partnered with the YMCA Youth and Government program which helps high school students conduct mock oversight hearings on relevant topics, such as social media surveillance by schools.

== Conferences and Events ==
The Levin Center has held conferences on topics including congressional oversight of classified programs, the role of executive privilege in congressional investigations, offshore multinational corporate tax reform, immigration law issues, the role of Inspectors General in congressional oversight, gerrymandering, oversight of science and technology policy, emerging oversight case law, and infrastructure oversight.

The center has also hosted individual panels on a variety of topics to improve oversight and civil discourse. Topics have included congressional oversight databases, the role of congressional oversight in battling cybersecurity threats, civilian oversight of law enforcement, oversight of emergency government contracts during the pandemic, election audits, and post-election analyses.

== Awards ==
Since 2018, the Levin Center has periodically presented the Carl Levin Award for Effective Oversight "to one or more individuals who have played a central role in an oversight investigation conducted on a bipartisan basis with a dedication to fact-finding." Past winners include South Carolina State Representative Weston J. Newton; the U.S. Senate Select Committee on Intelligence's chair, Senator Richard Burr of North Carolina, and vice chair, Mark Warner of Virginia; and Oregon State Senator Sara Gelser Blouin.

Beginning in 2020, the Levin Center has issued an annual Award for Excellence in Oversight Research to a scholar who submits an "original, timely, publishable scholarly work in the form of an academic article, book chapter, or written product of similar magnitude" on matters of legislative oversight. Past recipients include Professor Emily Berman of the University of Houston Law Center and Professors Kevin Stack and Michael Vandenbergh of Vanderbilt University Law School.

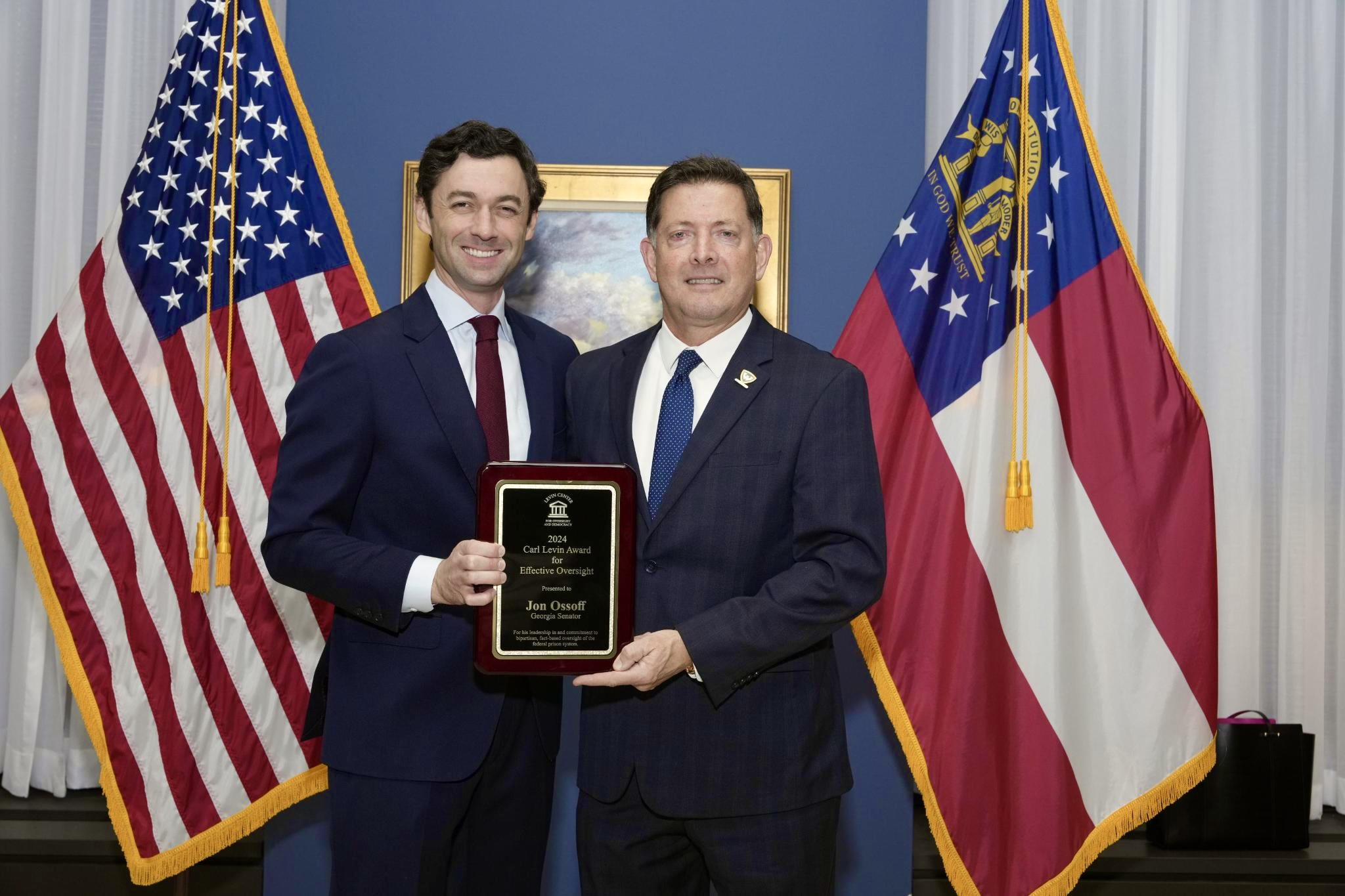
Senator Jon Ossoff receiving the 2024 Carl Levin Award

In 2021, the Levin Center launched an oversight fellowship program to provide financial support to non-resident scholars conducting research into oversight issues involving Congress or state legislatures. Past Levin Center Oversight Fellows include Kenneth Lowande from the University of Michigan, Claire Leavitt of Grinnell College, Devin Judge-Lord of Harvard University, Christina Kinane of Yale University, and Josh McCrain of the University of Utah.

== Internships/Externships ==
Since 2016, the Levin Center has selected and provided stipends to Wayne Law students who spend the summer working on Capitol Hill as legal interns at congressional committees conducting oversight. Interns have worked on the Senate Homeland Security and Governmental Affairs Committee, Senate Committee on Finance, House Select Subcommittee on the Coronavirus Crisis, House Committee on Financial Services, Senate Permanent Subcommittee on Investigations, House Committee on Energy and Commerce, House Committee on Oversight and Reform, House Committee on Ways and Means, and others.

Beginning in 2021, the Levin Center helped create and support a law school externship program in conjunction with the Damon J. Keith Center for Civil Rights and the Wayne Law Experiential Learning program entitled, "Lawyering in the Nation's Capital." Wayne Law students in the program spend a semester in Washington, D.C., working with congressional oversight committees or civil rights organizations.

== Podcast ==
In January 2021, the Levin Center launched a podcast series on legislative oversight called, "Oversight Matters," to explore important oversight issues. Guests have included Senator Carl Levin, Deputy Chief Counsel for the Senate Watergate Committee Rufus Edmisten, Nebraska State Senator Machaela Cavanaugh, and New York Times investigative reporter Jesse Drucker. It is hosted by Ben Eikey.

== Notable Advisory Board Members ==
- Jocelyn Benson, 43rd Secretary of State of Michigan
- Former U.S. Senator Tom Coburn, Oklahoma
- Former U.S. Senator Tom Daschle, South Dakota
- Former Michigan House Speaker Paul Hillegonds
- Former U.S. Senator Jay Rockefeller, West Virginia
- Former U.S. Senator Olympia Snowe, Maine
- Former U.S. Representative David Trott, Michigan
- Former American Bar Association President Reggie M. Turner Jr.
