= American Civil Liberties Union v. National Security Agency =

ACLU v. NSA
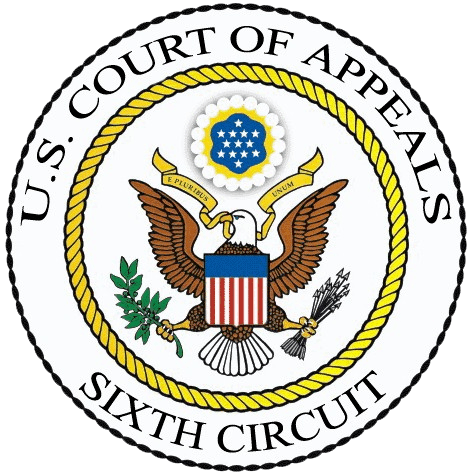
- Court: United States Court of Appeals for the Sixth Circuit
- Full case name: American Civil Liberties Union v. National Security Agency
- Argued: January 31, 2007
- Decided: July 6, 2007
- Citation: 493 F.3d 644

Case history
- Prior history: Summary judgment for the plaintiffs, 06-CV-10204 (E.D. Mich.)
- Subsequent history: Appeal turned down by U.S. Supreme Court without comment on February 19, 2008.

Holding
- The ACLU did not have standing to bring the suit against the NSA, because plaintiffs could not present evidence that they were the targets of the "Terrorist Surveillance Program".

Court membership
- Judges sitting: Alice M. Batchelder, Ronald Lee Gilman, and Julia Smith Gibbons

Case opinions
- Majority: Batchelder
- Concurrence: Gibbons
- Dissent: Gilman

American Civil Liberties Union v. National Security Agency, 493 F.3d 644 (6th Cir. 2007), is a case decided July 6, 2007, in which the United States Court of Appeals for the Sixth Circuit held that the plaintiffs in the case did not have standing to bring the suit against the National Security Agency (NSA), because they could not present evidence that they were the targets of the so-called "Terrorist Surveillance Program" (TSP).

On January 17, 2006, the American Civil Liberties Union (ACLU) on its own behalf, and on the behalf of three other organizations and five individuals, sued the National Security Agency (NSA) in the United States District Court for the Eastern District of Michigan, seeking declaratory judgment and injunctive relief arguing the TSP was unconstitutional and a violation of federal law. The government argued that the lawsuit should be dismissed or alternatively be granted summary judgment based on the State Secrets Privilege and the plaintiffs' lack of standing.

On August 17, 2006, District Court Judge Anna Diggs Taylor granted summary judgment for the plaintiffs, ruling that the TSP specifically involving "international telephone and internet communications of numerous persons and organizations" within the United States of America, was unconstitutional and illegal, and ordered that it be halted immediately. She stayed her order pending appeal. She did not rule on the alleged NSA database of domestic call detail records, citing the State Secrets Privilege.

On January 31, 2007, the Sixth Circuit Court of Appeals reversed the district court ruling on the grounds that the plaintiffs could not show that they had been or would be subjected to surveillance personally, and therefore they lacked standing before the Court. The Court emphasized, however, that FISA and Title III are the exclusive means by which electronic surveillance is permitted and that no other authorization can comply with the law.

On February 19, 2008, the United States Supreme Court, without comment, turned down an appeal from the ACLU to let it pursue a lawsuit against the program that began shortly after the September 11th terrorist attacks.

== Background ==
After September 11, 2001 (or perhaps earlier), the NSA began a classified foreign intelligence program, since named the Terrorist Surveillance Program, to intercept the international telephone and internet communications of numerous persons and organizations within the United States, without obtaining warrants and therefore outside the parameters of the Foreign Intelligence Surveillance Act of 1978.

The plaintiffs include the ACLU, the Council on American–Islamic Relations, the National Association of Criminal Defense Lawyers, and Greenpeace along with five individuals who are authors and journalists: Christopher Hitchens, James Bamford, Tara McKelvey, democracy scholar Larry Diamond of Stanford University and the Hoover Institution, and Afghanistan scholar Barnett Rubin of New York University. They stated in their complaint that they all have a history of communicating with people in or from the Middle East and on that basis they had a "well founded belief" of having been targeted by the TSP, based on the available public information regarding the program.

ACLU v. NSA, along with a separate lawsuit simultaneously filed by the Center for Constitutional Rights, are the first lawsuits to challenge the TSP.

== District court opinion ==
Judge Taylor wrote a 44-page, 11-part opinion in which she examined the defendant's claim over state secrets, standing, and the President's war time claim. Judge Taylor found that the NSA surveillance Program violated statutory law in regard to the FISA. Furthermore, she concluded that the NSA program violated the Constitution in regard to the First Amendment, Fourth Amendment, and Separation of powers Doctrine. Judge Taylor stayed her own opinion, preventing it from taking effect, pending a September 7 hearing.

Here are some excerpts from her opinion:

[pp. 23–24] [I]t is important to note that if the court were to deny standing based on the unsubstantiated minor distinctions drawn by Defendants, the President's actions in warrantless wiretapping, in contravention of FISA, Title II, and the First and Fourth amendments, would be immunized from judicial scrutiny. It was never the intent of the Framers to give the President such unfettered control, particularly where his actions blatantly disregard the parameters clearly enumerated in the Bill of Rights. The three separate branches of government were developed as a check and balance for one another. It is within the court's duty to ensure that power is never condensed into a single branch of government.

[p. 33] The President of the United States, a creature of the same Constitution which gave us these Amendments, has undisputedly violated the Fourth in failing to procure judicial orders as required by FISA, and accordingly has violated the First Amendment Rights of these Plaintiffs as well.

[p. 40] The Government appears to argue here that, pursuant to the penumbra of Constitutional language in Article II, and particularly because the President is designated Commander in Chief of the Army and Navy, he has been granted the inherent power to violate not only the laws of the Congress but the First and Fourth Amendments of the Constitution, itself. We must first note that the Office of the Chief Executive has itself been created, with its powers, by the Constitution. There are no hereditary Kings in America and no power not created by the Constitution. So all "inherent power" must derive from that Constitution.

== Reaction ==
The White House issued a statement saying:

The Terrorist Surveillance Program is firmly grounded in law and regularly reviewed to make sure steps are taken to protect civil liberties. The Terrorist Surveillance Program has proven to be one of our most critical and effective tools in the war against terrorism, and we look forward to demonstrating on appeal the validity of this vital program.

ACLU Executive Director Anthony Romero stated:

President [George W.] Bush may believe he can authorize spying on Americans without judicial or Congressional approval, but this program is illegal and we intend to put a stop to it... The current surveillance of Americans is a chilling assertion of presidential power that has not been seen since the days of Richard Nixon.

According to The New York Times, several legal experts, including some who agreed with its conclusion, said the decision "overlooked important precedents, failed to engage the government's major arguments, used circular reasoning, substituted passion for analysis and did not even offer the best reasons for its own conclusions".

Some legal analysts, such as Salon columnist Glenn Greenwald argued that critics of Taylor's reasoning were mistaken:

It is true that there are parts of Judge Taylor's opinion which are surprisingly conclusory, but that does not necessarily make it flawed. It is amazing to watch virtually everyone who is trying to attack her opinion do so by making arguments which the DoJ never made in the case before her. A basic familiarity with this case and with the rules of civil procedure—both of which many of her critics clearly lacked—would reveal that Judge Taylor's opinion was infinitely more sound than the conventional wisdom (thanks to many of these law professors) now holds that it was.

Still others, such as Harvard constitutional law professor Laurence Tribe, took an intermediate position:

Judge Taylor's [opinion is an] unusually casual and surprisingly breezy way of dispatching the Bush administration's legal defense of its NSA warrantless surveillance program.... It's altogether too easy to make disparaging remarks about the quality of the Taylor opinion, which seems almost to have been written more to poke a finger in the President's eye than to please the legal commentariat or even, alas, to impress an appellate panel, although I certainly agree with the many who predict that, while her reasoning is bound not to be embraced, her bottom line is very likely to survive appellate review.

== Sixth Circuit Court of Appeals ==
On October 4, 2006, a unanimous three-judge panel of the Sixth Circuit Court of Appeal stayed the district court's ruling pending evaluation of the government's appeal. In the three-paragraph ruling, the court explained that it decided to grant the government's motion to stay after balancing the likelihood an appeal would succeed, the potential damage to both sides, and the public's interest in final judicial decree.

The Cincinnati-based 6th U.S. Circuit Court of Appeals heard oral arguments on the government's appeal on January 31, 2007.

In its July 6, 2007 decision, the circuit court overturned Judge Taylor's ruling in a 2–1 vote. The majority declined to rule on the legality of the program, finding that the plaintiffs lacked standing to bring the suit.

Here are some excerpts of the Court's decision:

The plaintiffs do not contend — nor could they — that the mere practice of wiretapping (i.e., eavesdropping) is, by itself, unconstitutional, illegal, or even improper. Rather, the plaintiffs object to the NSA's eavesdropping without warrants, specifically FISA warrants with their associated limitations and minimization requirements.

But the plaintiffs do not — and because of the State Secrets Doctrine cannot — produce any evidence that any of their own communications have ever been intercepted by the NSA, under the TSP, or without warrants. Instead, they assert a mere belief, which they contend is reasonable and which they label a "well founded belief,"...

Notably, the plaintiffs do not allege as injury that they personally, either as individuals or associations, anticipate or fear any form of direct reprisal by the government (e.g., the NSA, the Justice Department, the Department of Homeland Security, etc.), such as criminal prosecution, deportation, administrative inquiry, civil litigation, or even public exposure. The injuries that these plaintiffs allege are not so direct; they are more amorphous...

Implicit in each of the plaintiffs' alleged injuries is the underlying possibility — which the plaintiffs label a "well founded belief" and seek to treat as a probability or even a certainty — that the NSA is presently intercepting, or will eventually intercept, communications to or from one or more of these particular plaintiffs, and that such interception would be detrimental to the plaintiffs' clients, sources, or overseas contacts. This is the premise upon which the plaintiffs' entire theory is built. But even though the plaintiffs' beliefs — based on their superior knowledge of their contacts' activities — may be reasonable, the alternative possibility remains that the NSA might not be intercepting, and might never actually intercept, any communication by any of the plaintiffs named in this lawsuit.

By claiming six causes of action, the plaintiffs have actually engaged in a thinly veiled, though perfectly acceptable, ruse. To call a spade a spade, the plaintiffs have only one claim, namely, breach of privacy, based on a purported violation of the Fourth Amendment or FISA — i.e., the plaintiffs do not want the NSA listening to their phone calls or reading their emails. That is really all there is to it. On a straightforward reading, this claim does not implicate the First Amendment. The problem with asserting only a breach-of-privacy claim is that, because the plaintiffs cannot show that they have been or will be subjected to surveillance personally, they clearly cannot establish standing under the Fourth Amendment or FISA. The plaintiffs concede as much. In an attempt to avoid this problem, the plaintiffs have recast their injuries as a matter of free speech and association, characterized their claim as a violation of the First Amendment, and engaged the First Amendment's relaxed rules on standing. This argument is not novel, but neither is it frivolous; it warrants consideration, analysis, and a full explanation by this court.

Both FISA and Title III expressly prohibit electronic surveillance outside of their statutory frameworks, as set forth in Part I.B.4.b. above. The language used is unequivocal. In enacting FISA, Congress directed that electronic surveillance conducted inside the United States for foreign intelligence purposes was to be undertaken only as authorized by specific federal statutory authority. See 50 U.S.C. § 1809. Title III criminalizes the interception and disclosure of wire, oral, and electronic communications except under certain specified exceptions. See 18 U.S.C. § 2511(2)(f). The statute clearly states that chapter 119 and FISA "shall be the exclusive means by which electronic surveillance . . . and the interception of domestic wire, oral, and electronic communications may be conducted.

Congress has thus unequivocally declared that FISA and Title III are the exclusive means by which electronic surveillance is permitted. No other authorization can comply with the law. Congress further emphasized this point by criminalizing the undertaking of electronic surveillance not authorized by statute in two separate places in the U.S. Code. See 50 U.S.C. § 1809; 18 U.S.C. § 2511(1) & (2)(e).

(Footnotes omitted)

== U.S. Supreme Court ==
On February 19, 2008, the U.S. Supreme Court denied the ACLU's petition for a writ of certiorari, declining to hear an appeal in the case.

== See also ==
- United States v. U.S. District Court, 1972, U.S. Supreme Court unanimous decision that established the requirement for warrants in cases involving the domestic use of electronic surveillance on Fourth Amendment grounds.
