= Lawrence Gubow =

American judge (1919–1978)

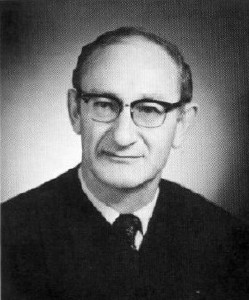

Judge of the United States District Court for the Eastern District of Michigan
- In office September 14, 1968 – March 26, 1978
- Appointed by: Lyndon B. Johnson
- Preceded by: Wade H. McCree
- Succeeded by: Julian A. Cook

Personal details
- Born: January 10, 1919 Detroit, Michigan
- Died: March 26, 1978 (aged 59)
- Education: University of Michigan (AB, LLB)

Military service
- Allegiance: United States
- Branch/service: United States Army
- Years of service: 1941–1948
- Rank: Captain

Lawrence Gubow (January 10, 1919 – March 26, 1978) was a United States district judge of the United States District Court for the Eastern District of Michigan.

== Education and career ==
Born in Detroit, Michigan, Gubow received an Artium Baccalaureus degree from the University of Michigan in 1940. He received a Bachelor of Laws from University of Michigan Law School in 1950. He was in the United States Army as a Captain from 1941 to 1948. He was in private practice of law in Detroit from 1951 to 1953. He was Commissioner of the Michigan Corporations and Securities Commission from 1953 to 1961. He was United States Attorney for the Eastern District of Michigan from 1961 to 1968.

== Federal judicial service ==
Gubow was nominated by President Lyndon B. Johnson on August 2, 1968, to a seat on the United States District Court for the Eastern District of Michigan vacated by Judge Wade H. McCree. He was confirmed by the United States Senate on September 13, 1968, and received his commission on September 14, 1968. His service was terminated on March 26, 1978, due to his death.

== See also ==
- List of Jewish American jurists

== Sources ==
Legal offices
Preceded by Wade H. McCree	Judge of the United States District Court for the Eastern District of Michigan; 1961–1966	Succeeded by Julian Abele Cook Jr.
