= Wade H. McCree =

American judge (1920–1987)

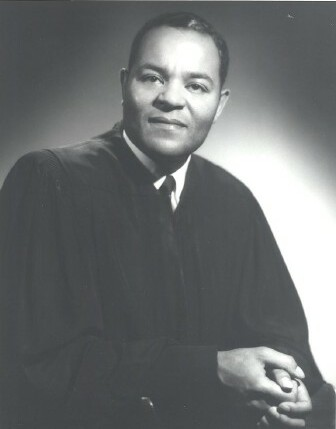

36th Solicitor General of the United States
- In office March 28, 1977 – January 20, 1981
- Appointed by: Jimmy Carter
- Preceded by: Robert Bork
- Succeeded by: Rex E. Lee

Judge of the United States Court of Appeals for the Sixth Circuit
- In office September 7, 1966 – March 28, 1977
- Appointed by: Lyndon B. Johnson
- Preceded by: Seat established by 80 Stat. 75
- Succeeded by: Damon Keith

Judge of the United States District Court for the Eastern District of Michigan
- In office September 29, 1961 – September 13, 1966
- Appointed by: John F. Kennedy
- Preceded by: Seat established by 75 Stat. 80
- Succeeded by: Lawrence Gubow

Personal details
- Born: Wade Hampton McCree Jr. July 3, 1920 Des Moines, Iowa, U.S.
- Died: August 30, 1987 (aged 67) Detroit, Michigan, U.S.
- Party: Democratic
- Education: Fisk University (AB); Harvard University (LLB)

Wade Hampton McCree Jr. (July 3, 1920 – August 30, 1987) was an American legal scholar and judge. He was the first African American appointed as a United States circuit judge of the United States Court of Appeals for the Sixth Circuit and the second African-American United States Solicitor General in the history of the United States. He joined the faculty of the University of Michigan Law School after leaving government service in 1981, and taught there until the time of his death.

== Education and career ==
McCree was born on July 3, 1920, in Des Moines, Iowa. He was the son of Wade Hampton McCree Sr., a graduate of Fisk University who had worked his way through college as a butler and who became the first African-American pharmacist and pharmacy owner in Iowa. McCree senior was later employed as first African-American narcotics inspector for the Food and Drug Administration. McCree grew up mainly in Boston, and attended the prestigious Boston Latin School. Like his father, McCree worked his way through Fisk University. He was elected to the Phi Beta Kappa society and graduated summa cum laude in 1941 with an Artium Baccalaureus degree. After serving a four-year stint as a Captain in the United States Army during World War II, McCree entered Harvard Law School and graduated 12th in his class in 1948 with a Bachelor of Laws. McCree and his wife, Dores, a graduate of Simmons College, then moved to her hometown of Detroit, Michigan where they raised three children. McCree practiced law at the black law firm of Bledsoe & Taylor from 1948 to 1952. He began his long career in public service in 1953 when was appointed to the Workman's Compensation Commission by Michigan Governor G. Mennen Williams. Two years later McCree became the first African-American to be appointed to the Circuit Court for Wayne County, Michigan, and served on that court from 1954 to 1961.

== Federal judicial service ==
McCree was nominated by President John F. Kennedy on September 18, 1961, to the United States District Court for the Eastern District of Michigan, to a new seat authorized by 75 Stat. 80. He was confirmed by the United States Senate on September 23, 1961, and received his commission on September 29, 1961, becoming the first African-American on that court. His service terminated on September 13, 1966, due to elevation to the Sixth Circuit.

McCree was nominated by President Lyndon B. Johnson on August 16, 1966, to the United States Court of Appeals for the Sixth Circuit, to a new seat authorized by 80 Stat. 75. He was confirmed by the Senate on September 7, 1966, and received his commission on September 7, 1966, becoming the first African-American on that court. His service terminated on March 28, 1977, due to his resignation.

=== Views on race ===
While sitting on the federal bench, McCree was known to have expressed his views on race and justice. When a lawyer argued that McCree could not impartially decide a case involving a black and a white litigant, McCree replied that "the ultimate of arrogance is achieved when a white person thinks another white person can make a judgment without being influenced by race, and a black person cannot."

== Friends School ==
When his eldest daughter, Kathleen McCree Lewis, was refused admission to an all-girls school in Detroit because she was black, McCree founded the interracial Friends School in 1965. He was also a founder of the statewide Higher Education Opportunity Committee, a program which identifies promising middle school students and provides them with college scholarships.

== Solicitor General service ==
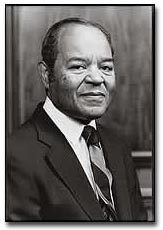
McCree as Solicitor General.

McCree left the Sixth Circuit when President Jimmy Carter appointed him United States Solicitor General. As Solicitor General, McCree served as the head appellate lawyer for the United States Government and represented the administration in cases before the United States Supreme Court.

=== Notable cases ===
McCree personally argued 25 cases before the Supreme Court, including the Richard Nixon presidential tapes case and the Regents of the University of California v. Bakke affirmative action case. In Bakke, McCree argued that race could be one factor in deciding whether an applicant was admitted to medical school. He said at the time that he was "in favor of special admissions programs, but people who can outgrow them should not become dependent on them." Called the "10th Justice" by virtue of his office, McCree served as Solicitor General for four years.

== Later career ==
McCree resigned his commission as Solicitor General after the end of the Supreme Court's Term in June 1981, after Republican President Ronald Reagan took office. Chief Justice Burger had privately signaled his preference that McCree not be replaced until the end of the Term. McCree then became the Lewis M. Simes Professor of Law at the University of Michigan, where he taught until his death. During these years he also consulted on various cases and served as Special Master for United States Supreme Court cases of original jurisdiction.

== Death ==
McCree died on August 30, 1987, at age 67 of bone cancer and a heart ailment at Henry Ford Hospital in Detroit, Michigan. President Carter said at his memorial service that McCree was "a true American hero". McCree is interred at Woodlawn Cemetery.

== Legacy ==
McCree's daughter, Kathleen McCree Lewis, was nominated by President Bill Clinton to the United States Court of Appeals for the Sixth Circuit in 1999. However, the United States Senate failed to act on Lewis' nomination.

His son, Wade Harper McCree III, served as a 3rd Circuit Court judge in Wayne County, Michigan, from 2006 until May 2013. He was suspended without pay in May 2013 for multiple counts of misconduct. He was officially removed from office on March 26, 2014.

== See also ==
- List of African-American jurists
- List of African-American federal judges
- List of first minority male lawyers and judges in the United States

== Sources ==
Legal offices
Preceded by Seat established by 75 Stat. 80	Judge of the United States District Court for the Eastern District of Michigan; 1961–1966	Succeeded by Lawrence Gubow
Preceded by Seat established by 80 Stat. 75	Judge of the United States Court of Appeals for the Sixth Circuit; 1966–1977	Succeeded by Damon Keith
Preceded by Robert Bork	Solicitor General of the United States; 1977–1981	Succeeded by Rex E. Lee
