= Grace G. Costavas Murphy =

American lawyer (died 1932)

Grace G. Costavas Murphy (sometimes referred to as Grayce Costavas Murphy) was Michigan’s first African American female lawyer. She graduated from the Detroit College of Law in 1923. Upon being sworn in as an attorney in Wayne County the same year, Murphy became the first African American female admitted to practice law in Michigan. She died in 1932.

== See also ==
- List of first women lawyers and judges in Michigan
