= Arthur Tarnow =

American judge (1942–2022)

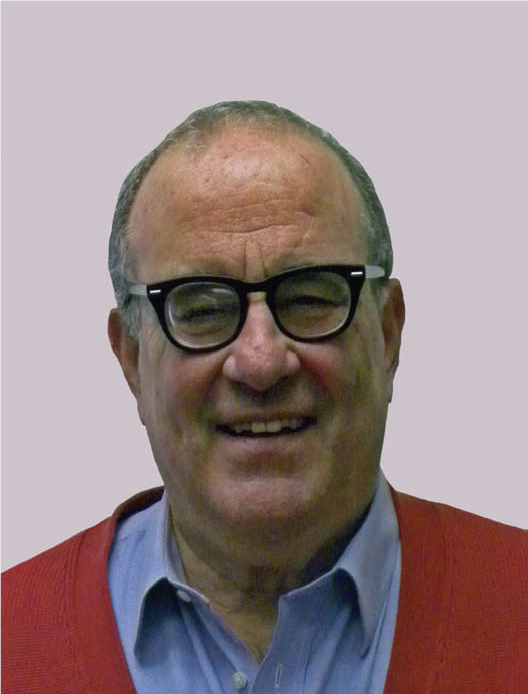

Senior Judge of the United States District Court for the Eastern District of Michigan
- In office May 26, 2010 – January 21, 2022

Judge of the United States District Court for the Eastern District of Michigan
- In office May 22, 1998 – May 26, 2010
- Appointed by: Bill Clinton
- Preceded by: Julian A. Cook
- Succeeded by: Terrence Berg

Personal details
- Born: February 3, 1942 Detroit, Michigan
- Died: January 21, 2022 (aged 79) Detroit, Michigan
- Education: Wayne State University (BA, JD)

Arthur Jeffrey Tarnow (February 3, 1942 – January 21, 2022) was an American jurist who served as a United States district judge of the United States District Court for the Eastern District of Michigan.

== Early life and career ==
Tarnow was born in Detroit, Michigan, on February 3, 1942. He received a Bachelor of Arts degree from Wayne State University in 1963 and a Juris Doctor from Wayne State University Law School in 1965. He was a law clerk to John Fitzgerald, Louis McGregor, and Timothy Quinn of the Michigan Court of Appeals in 1967. He was a lecturer at the University of Papua New Guinea from 1967 to 1968. He was a chief deputy defender for Legal Aid and Defenders from 1969 to 1970. He was an attorney for the Michigan State Appellate Defender Office from 1970 to 1972. He was in private practice of law in Michigan from 1973 to 1998.

== Federal judicial service ==
On September 24, 1997, Tarnow was nominated by President Bill Clinton to a seat on the United States District Court for the Eastern District of Michigan vacated by Julian A. Cook. Tarnow was confirmed by the United States Senate on May 13, 1998, and received his commission on May 22, 1998. He assumed senior status on May 26, 2010. (Note: His portrait hangs in Judge Terrence Berg's courtroom.)

== Death ==
Tarnow died from heart disease at Henry Ford Hospital in Detroit on January 21, 2022, at the age of 79.

== Sources ==
Legal offices
Preceded by Julian A. Cook	Judge of the United States District Court for the Eastern District of Michigan; 1998–2010	Succeeded by Terrence Berg
