= Dylan Wegela =

American politician from Michigan

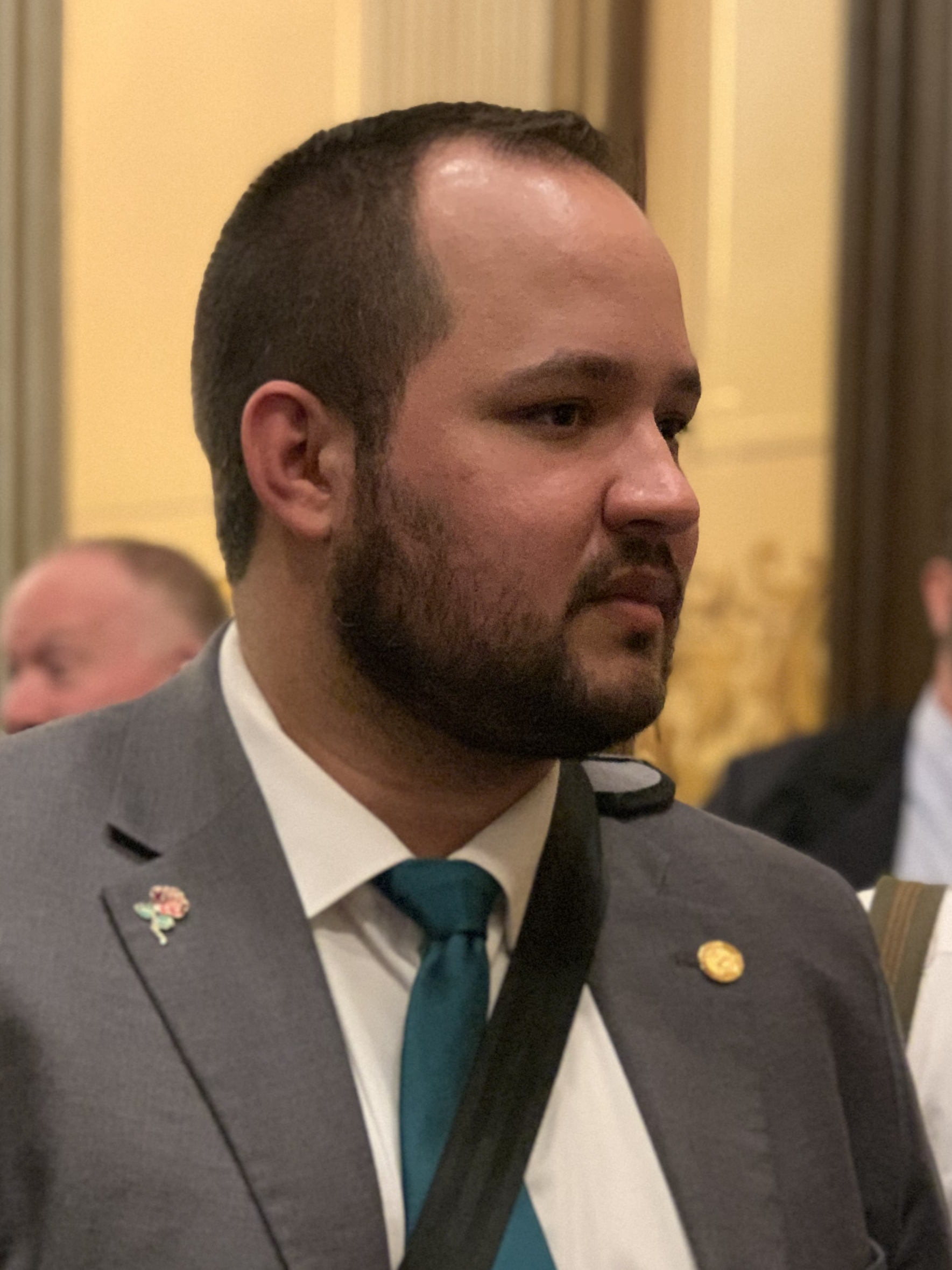
- Wegela in 2023

Member of the Michigan House of Representatives from the 26th district
- Incumbent
- Assumed office January 1, 2023
- Preceded by: Jim Ellison

Personal details
- Party: Democratic
- Education: Eastern Michigan University (BA)
- Website: House website Campaign website

Dylan Wegela is an American politician serving as a member of the Michigan House of Representatives since 2023, currently representing the 26th district. He is a member of the Democratic Party.

== Early life and education ==
Wegela grew up in Livonia, Michigan. His parents both worked for the Danny's Foods grocery store during his childhood. Later, his dad opened a bakery and a business that owns and operates vending machines, while his mom worked at a factory. His grandparents worked at Ford and General Motors, and were members of UAW.

He is a graduate of Eastern Michigan University.

== Early career ==
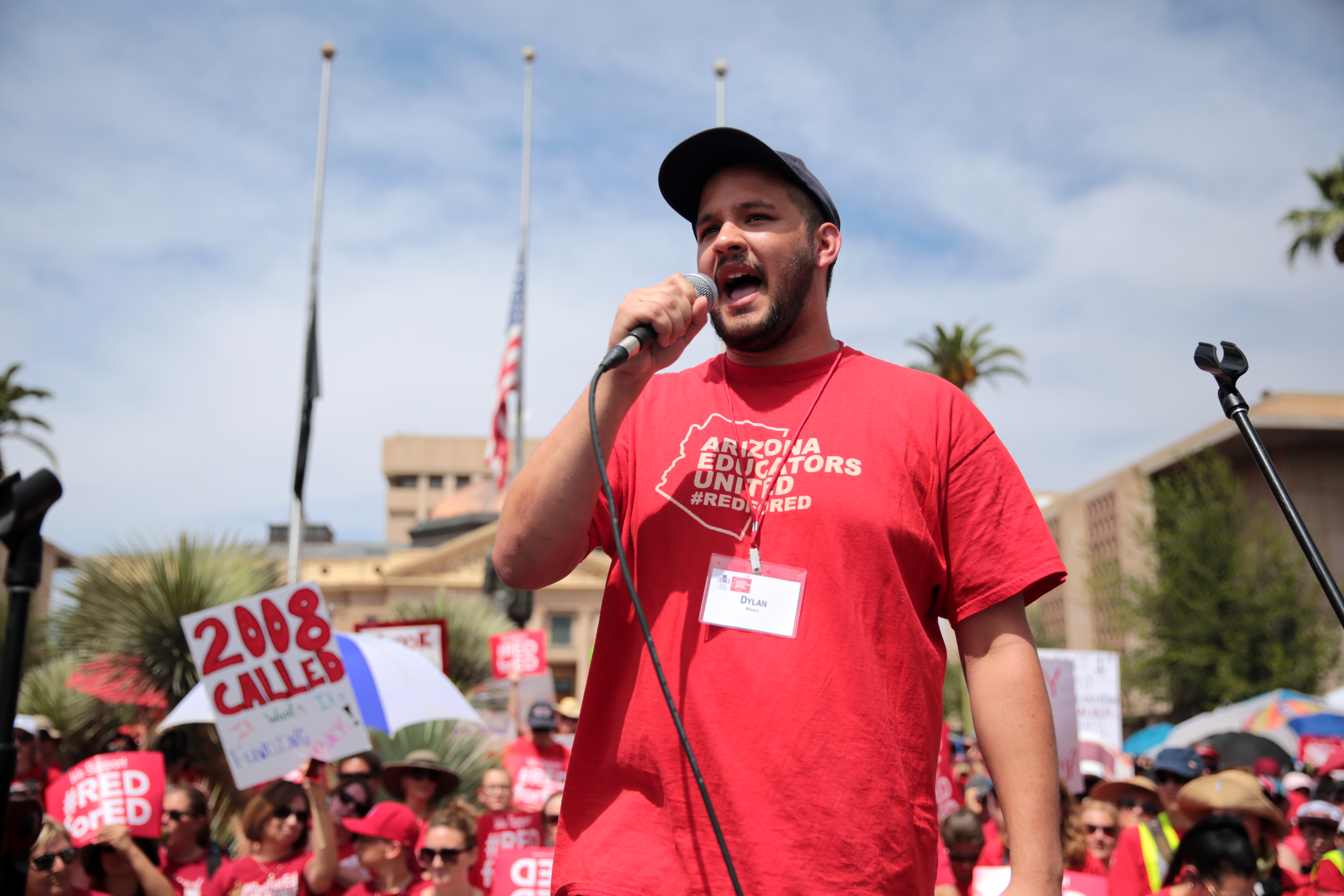
Wegela speaks at a Red for Ed strike in 2018.

Before running for the Michigan House, Wegela spent 7 years as a teacher, union organizer, and education activist, living in South Korea, Arizona, and Michigan.

Wegela "cut [his] teeth" organizing for Bernie Sanders's presidential campaign in 2016. Later, he was part of the "Red for Ed" teacher strike wave in Arizona, where he founded Arizona Educators United and secured over $400 million for public education. He then became president of his union local, the Cartwright Education Association.

== State legislature ==
=== House of Representatives ===
Wegela was elected to the Michigan House of Representatives on November 8, 2022. He was reelected in 2024.

== Personal life ==
Wegela resides with his wife Anna, a social worker, in Garden City. He is a member of the Democratic Socialists of America.
