= Dave Woodward =

American politician

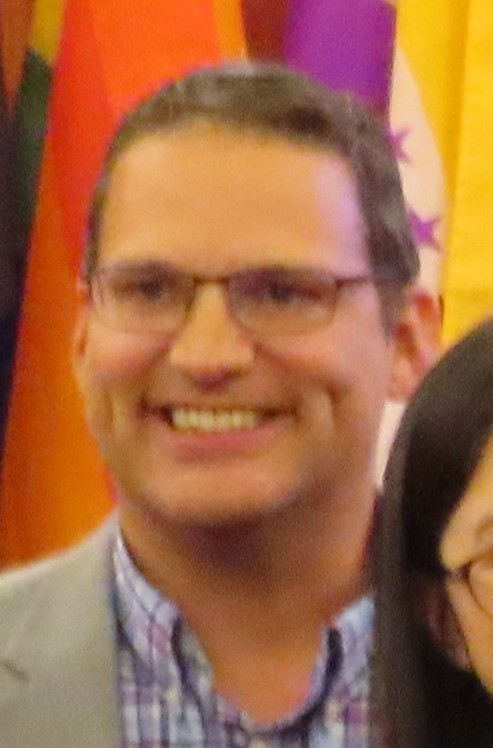

Chair of the Oakland County Board of Commissioners
- Incumbent
- Assumed office January 10, 2019
- Preceded by: Michael Gingell

Member of the Oakland County Board of Commissioners
- Incumbent
- Assumed office January 1, 2005
- Preceded by: Peter Webster
- Constituency: 18th district (2005–2013); 19th district (2013–2023); 1st district (2023–present)

Member of the Michigan House of Representatives
- In office January 1, 1999 – January 1, 2005
- Preceded by: John Freeman
- Succeeded by: Marie Donigan
- Constituency: 34th district (1999–2003); 26th district (2003–2005)

Personal details
- Born: 1976 (age 49–50)
- Party: Democratic
- Spouse: Stacie Woodward
- Children: 2
- Education: Wayne State University (BA)

David T. "Dave" Woodward (born 1976) is an American politician currently serving as chairman of the Oakland County Board of Commissioners since 2019. A member of the Democratic Party, he has served on the Board of Commissioners since 2005. He previously served as a member of the Michigan House of Representatives from 1999 to 2004, representing District 26.

Outside of his service on the Board of Commissioners, Woodward owns the political consulting firm Pivot Point Strategies, whose clients include Sheetz and six Democratic members of the Board of Commissioners. As of April 2026, Woodward is the subject of a recall petition.
