= Michigan's 26th House of Representatives district =

American legislative district

Michigan's 26th State House of Representatives district
Representative
Dylan Wegela; D–Garden City
- Demographics: 48% White; 38.3% Black; 5% Hispanic; 1% Asian; 0.3% Native American; 0.4% Other; 7% Multiracial
- Population (2024): 89,310

Michigan's 26th House of Representatives district is a legislative district within the Michigan House of Representatives located in Wayne County. The district was created in 1965, when the Michigan Supreme Court ordered the reapportionment of state legislative districts from a county-based system to a proportional one following the Supreme Court case Reynolds v. Sims. It is currently represented by Democrat Dylan Wegela of Garden City.

== List of representatives ==
Representative	Party	Years	Residence	Notes
Matthew McNeely	Democratic	1965–1972	Detroit	Redistricted to the 16th district.
Kirby Holmes	Republican (Note: Rep. Holmes reportedly considered himself an independent while running in the 1976 election, though he still ran under the Republican label.)	1973–1978	Utica	
Kenneth Joseph DeBeaussaert	Democratic	1979–1980	Washington Township	
Kirby Holmes	Republican	1981–1982	Utica	
Mary Ellen Parrott	Democratic	1983–1984	Utica	
Douglas Carl	Republican	1985–1986	Utica	
William S. Browne	Democratic	1987–1988	Utica	
David Jaye	Republican	1989–1992	Shelby Township	Redistricted to the 32nd district.
Tracey A. Yokich	Democratic	1993–1996	St. Clair Shores	Redistricted from the 74th district.
William J. Callahan	Democratic	1997–2002	St. Clair Shores	Term limited.
David T. Woodward	Democratic	2003–2004	Madison Heights	Redistricted from the 34th district; term limited.
Marie Donigan	Democratic	2005–2010	Royal Oak	Term limited.
Jim Townsend	Democratic	2011–2016	Royal Oak	Term limited.
Jim Ellison	Democratic	2017–2022	Royal Oak	Term limited.
Dylan Wegela	Democratic	2023–present	Garden City	

== Historical district boundaries ==
Map	Description	Apportionment Plan	Notes
	Wayne County (part): Detroit (part); Ecorse; River Rouge	1964 Apportionment Plan (Note: Referred to as the Austin-Kleiner plan.)	
	Macomb County (part): Bruce Township (part); Chesterfield Township; Harrison Township (part); Lenox Township; Macomb Township; New Baltimore (part); Ray Township; Richmond; Richmond Township; Shelby Charter Township; Washington Township; St. Clair County (part): Casco Township (part); Ira Township; New Baltimore (part)	1972 Apportionment Plan (Note: Referred to as the Hatcher-Kleiner plan.)	
	Macomb County (part): Macomb Township; Shelby Charter Township; Sterling Heights (part); Utica; Washington Township	1982 Apportionment Plan	
	Macomb County (part): Harrison Township; Lake Township; St. Clair Shores (part)	1992 Apportionment Plan	
	Oakland County (part): Madison Heights; Royal Oak	2001 Apportionment Plan	
	Oakland County (part): Madison Heights; Royal Oak	2011 Apportionment Plan	
	Wayne County (part): Garden City (part); Inkster; Romulus (part); Westland (part)	2021 Apportionment Plan (Note: Referred to as the Hickory plan.)	

== Recent elections ==
=== 2020s ===
2026 Michigan House of Representatives election
Party	Candidate	Votes	%
Democratic	Dylan Wegela (incumbent)	24,255	70.96
Republican	Chris Dobis	9,928	29.04
Total votes		34,183	100
Democratic hold			

2024 Michigan House of Representatives election
Party	Candidate	Votes	%
Democratic	Dylan Wegela (incumbent)	27,162	65.72
Republican	Jeff Gorman	14,171	34.28
Total votes		41,333	100
Democratic hold			

2022 Michigan House of Representatives election
Party	Candidate	Votes	%
Democratic	Dylan Wegela	20,470	67.8
Republican	James C. Townsend	9,721	32.2
Total votes		30,191	100
Democratic hold			

2020 Michigan House of Representatives election
Party	Candidate	Votes	%
Democratic	Jim Ellison (incumbent)	33,208	63.66
Republican	Chris Meister	18,955	36.34
Total votes		52,163	100
Democratic hold			

=== 2010s ===
2018 Michigan House of Representatives election
Party	Candidate	Votes	%
Democratic	Jim Ellison (incumbent)	27,962	68.51
Republican	Al Gui	12,853	31.49
Total votes		40,815	100
Democratic hold			

2016 Michigan House of Representatives election
Party	Candidate	Votes	%
Democratic	Jim Ellison	26,785	59.37
Republican	Randy LeVasseur	18,333	40.63
Total votes		45,118	100
Democratic hold			

2014 Michigan House of Representatives election
Party	Candidate	Votes	%
Democratic	Jim Townsend (incumbent)	17,755	60.95
Republican	Greg Dildilian	11,377	39.05
Total votes		29,132	100
Democratic hold			

2012 Michigan House of Representatives election
Party	Candidate	Votes	%
Democratic	Jim Townsend (incumbent)	26,094	60.36
Republican	Mark Bliss	15,502	35.86
Libertarian	James K. Young	1,636	3.78
Total votes		43,232	100
Democratic hold			

2010 Michigan House of Representatives election
Party	Candidate	Votes	%
Democratic	Jim Townsend	15,490	52.02
Republican	Ken Rosen	13,347	44.83
Libertarian	James K. Young	938	3.15
Total votes		29,775	100
Democratic hold			

=== 2000s ===
2008 Michigan House of Representatives election
Party	Candidate	Votes	%
Democratic	Marie Donigan (incumbent)	28,003	61.74
Republican	Michael Goodman	15,471	34.11
Libertarian	James K. Young	1,885	4.16
Total votes		45,359	100
Democratic hold			

2006 Michigan House of Representatives election
Party	Candidate	Votes	%
Democratic	Marie Donigan (incumbent)	22,079	62.21
Republican	Kevin Konczal	12,357	34.82
Libertarian	James K. Young	1,057	2.98
Total votes		35,493	100
Democratic hold			

2004 Michigan House of Representatives election
Party	Candidate	Votes	%
Democratic	Marie Donigan	22,780	49.08
Republican	Carlo P. Ginotti	20,954	45.14
Independent	Dale Savage	1,529	3.29
Libertarian	Sara L. Sjoberg	1,148	2.47
Write-In	Christopher G. Bradshaw	5	0.01
Total votes		46,416	100
Democratic hold			

2002 Michigan House of Representatives election
Party	Candidate	Votes	%
Democratic	Dave Woodward	19,058	60.55
Republican	Josh West	11,697	37.16
Green	Dan D. Karam	722	2.29
Total votes		31,477	100
Democratic hold			

2000 Michigan House of Representatives election
Party	Candidate	Votes	%
Democratic	William J. Callahan (incumbent)	23,413	58.8
Republican	William J. Nearon	15,405	38.69
Libertarian	Keith P. Edwards	1,000	2.51
Total votes		39,818	100
Democratic hold			

=== 1990s ===
1998 Michigan House of Representatives election
Party	Candidate	Votes	%
Democratic	William J. Callahan (incumbent)	18,572	59.72
Republican	Barbara C. Urban	11,655	37.48
Libertarian	Keith P. Edwards	872	2.8
Total votes		31,099	100
Democratic hold			
