= Judith E. Levy =

American judge (born 1958)

Judith Levy
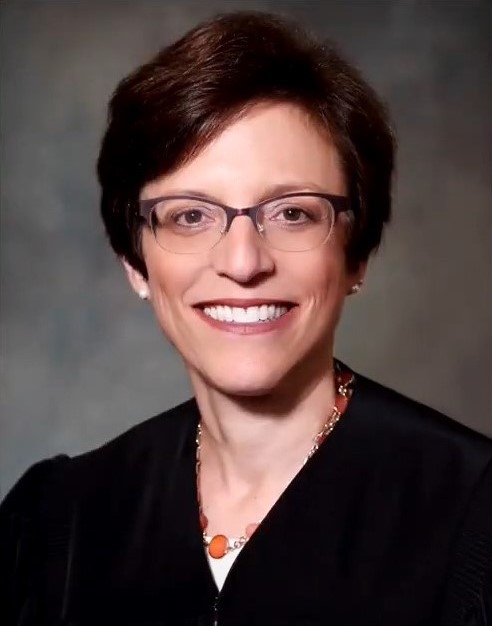

Judge of the United States District Court for the Eastern District of Michigan
- Incumbent
- Assumed office March 14, 2014
- Appointed by: Barack Obama
- Preceded by: Nancy Edmunds

Personal details
- Born: 1958 (age 67–68) Bloomington, Indiana, U.S.
- Education: University of Michigan (BS, JD)

Judith Ellen Levy (born 1958) is an American lawyer who has served as a United States district judge of the United States District Court for the Eastern District of Michigan since 2014.

== Early life ==
Levy was born in 1958 in Bloomington, Indiana. She received a Bachelor of Science degree in 1981 from the University of Michigan and a Juris Doctor, cum laude, in 1996 from the University of Michigan Law School. Levy worked at the University of Michigan Hospital and served as the bargaining chairman for Local 1583 of the American Federation of State, County and Municipal Employees for six years.

Levy is openly gay and has three daughters.

She is Jewish.

== Career ==
From 1996 to 1999, she worked as a law clerk to Judge Bernard A. Friedman of the U.S. District Court for the Eastern District of Michigan. From 1999 to 2000, she was a trial attorney for the United States Equal Employment Opportunity Commission. From 2000 to 2014, Levy served as an Assistant United States Attorney in the Eastern District of Michigan, and was Chief of the Civil Rights Unit in 2010–2014.

=== Federal judicial service ===
On July 25, 2013, President Barack Obama nominated Levy to serve as a federal judge on the United States District Court for the Eastern District of Michigan, to the seat vacated by Judge Nancy Garlock Edmunds, who assumed senior status on August 1, 2012. On March 11, 2014, the United States Senate invoked cloture on her nomination by a 56–42 vote. On March 12, 2014, her nomination was confirmed by a 97–0 vote. She received her judicial commission on March 14, 2014. With her confirmation and receiving of commission, she became the first openly lesbian federal judge in Michigan.

==== Notable rulings ====
On November 10, 2021, Levy approved a $626 million settlement for the people of Flint who were affected by the Flint water crisis.

In December 2025, Levy declined to impose an additional two-year sentence related to illegal immigration charges on Honduran national Edys Renan Membreno Diaz, who had previously been convicted and sentenced for raping a disabled woman. While giving her ruling, Levy referred to Diaz as an "ambassador for living up to our immigration restrictions" and praised him for his "family devotion and willingness to perform work that it claimed Americans find undesirable."

== See also ==
- List of first women lawyers and judges in Michigan
- List of Jewish American jurists
- List of LGBT jurists in the United States

Legal offices
| Preceded by Nancy Garlock Edmunds | Judge of the United States District Court for the Eastern District of Michigan; 2014–present | Incumbent |
