= Nancy Garlock Edmunds =

American judge (born 1947)

Senior Judge of the United States District Court for the Eastern District of Michigan
- Incumbent
- Assumed office August 1, 2012

Judge of the United States District Court for the Eastern District of Michigan
- In office February 10, 1992 – August 1, 2012
- Appointed by: George H. W. Bush
- Preceded by: Richard Fred Suhrheinrich
- Succeeded by: Judith E. Levy

Personal details
- Born: 1947 (age 78–79) Detroit, Michigan
- Education: Cornell University (BA); University of Chicago (MAT); Wayne State University (JD)

Nancy Garlock Edmunds (born 1947) is a senior United States district judge of the United States District Court for the Eastern District of Michigan.

== Education and career ==
Edmunds was born in Detroit. She received a Bachelor of Arts degree from Cornell University in 1969, a Master of Arts in Teaching from the University of Chicago in 1971, and a Juris Doctor from Wayne State University Law School in 1976. She was a law clerk to Judge Ralph M. Freeman of the United States District Court for the Eastern District of Michigan from 1976 to 1978. She was in private practice in Detroit from 1978 to 1992.

=== Federal judicial service ===
On September 11, 1991, Edmunds was nominated by President George H. W. Bush to a seat on the United States District Court for the Eastern District of Michigan vacated by Judge Richard Fred Suhrheinrich. She was confirmed by the United States Senate on February 6, 1992, and received her commission on February 10, 1992. She assumed senior status on August 1, 2012.

== Sources ==
Legal offices
| Preceded by Richard Fred Suhrheinrich | Judge of the United States District Court for the Eastern District of Michigan; 1992–2012 | Succeeded by Judith E. Levy |
