= Mark Bernstein (University of Michigan) =

American regent and politician

Personal details
- Party: Democratic
- Education: University of Michigan (BA, JD, MBA)

Mark Bernstein is an American attorney and politician serving as a Regent of the University of Michigan since 2013. A member of the Democratic Party, Bernstein is also the president and managing partner of The Sam Bernstein Law Firm.

== Personal life and education ==
Bernstein earned a BA from the University of Michigan in 1993, and earned a J.D. and an M.B.A. from that same university in 1996.

== Career ==
During the Clinton Administration, Bernstein served as director of press pool operations. He later worked for Citigroup and The Law Offices of Sam Bernstein. Bernstein was appointed to the Michigan Civil Rights Commission by Governor Jennifer Granholm.

In 2012, Bernstein ran for a seat on the University of Michigan Board of Regents, campaigning on the idea that the cost of college is too high for students. Bernstein took a bus tour of the state, encountering many who were unaware that the position is elected statewide. Bernstein won the race, earning an 8-year term. He was reelected in 2020 and is chair of the Regents for the current term.

Bernstein was encouraged to enter the 2014 Michigan gubernatorial election, and has been mentioned as a potential future statewide candidate.
