= Marianne Battani =

American judge (1944–2021)

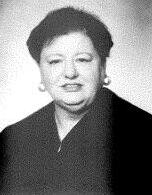

Senior Judge of the United States District Court for the Eastern District of Michigan
- In office June 9, 2012 – September 9, 2021

Judge of the United States District Court for the Eastern District of Michigan
- In office June 2, 2000 – June 9, 2012
- Appointed by: Bill Clinton
- Preceded by: Anna Diggs Taylor
- Succeeded by: Matthew F. Leitman

Personal details
- Born: Marianne Olga Battani; May 18, 1944 Detroit, Michigan, U.S.
- Died: September 9, 2021 (aged 77) Beverly Hills, Michigan, U.S.
- Cause of death: Cancer
- Education: University of Detroit (B.A.); Michigan State University College of Law (J.D.)

Marianne Olga Battani (May 18, 1944 – September 9, 2021) was an American jurist who served as United States district judge of the United States District Court for the Eastern District of Michigan.

== Education and career ==
Born in Detroit, Michigan, Battani received a Bachelor of Arts degree from the University of Detroit in 1966 and a Juris Doctor from Detroit College of Law in 1972. She was in private practice from 1972 to 1981. She was a judge on the Common Pleas Court of the City of Detroit in 1981, and a judge on that city's 36th District Court from 1981 to 1982. She was then a judge on the Wayne County Circuit Court until 2000.

== Federal judicial service ==
On August 5, 1999, Battani was nominated by President Bill Clinton to a seat on the United States District Court for the Eastern District of Michigan vacated by Anna Diggs Taylor. Battani was confirmed by the United States Senate on May 24, 2000, and received her commission on June 2, 2000. She assumed senior status on June 9, 2012.

In June 2020, she recused herself from numerous cases she was hearing due to cancer and took a leave of absence from the court. She assumed inactive senior status on December 31, 2020, meaning that while she remained a federal judge, she no longer heard cases or participated in the business of the court. She died on September 9, 2021, from cancer at her home in Beverly Hills, Michigan.

== Notable cases ==
Battani sentenced Alan Ralsky to more than four years in prison in November 2009 for crimes relating to his stock pump and dump spam activities.

Battani sentenced Rene Boucher, a former anesthesiologist, to 30 days' jail time, a fine, and one year probation, for physically attacking his neighbor, sitting United States Senator Rand Paul (R-Kentucky). The attack left Senator Paul with multiple fractured ribs and he contracted pneumonia. Prosecutors had sought a 21-month sentence. Battani ruled the attack had nothing to do with politics and was an "isolated incident". That sentence was vacated on appeal to the Sixth Circuit for being "substantively unreasonable" and Boucher was remanded for re-sentencing on September 9, 2019. He was re-sentenced to an additional eight months of prison time and six months' home confinement.

Legal offices
Preceded by Anna Diggs Taylor	Judge of the United States District Court for the Eastern District of Michigan; 2000–2012	Succeeded by Matthew F. Leitman
