= Dorothy Comstock Riley =

American judge (1924–2004)

Dorothy Comstock Riley (December 6, 1924 – October 23, 2004) was an American lawyer and jurist from Michigan, Detroit, who became the first woman to serve on the Michigan Court of Appeals and the first Hispanic woman to be elected to the Supreme Court of any state. Justice Riley was the first and only Hispanic judge to serve on the Michigan Supreme Court.

== Life and career ==
Riley was born in Detroit, Michigan, to Josephine Grima Comstock. Her mother is of Mexican descent, born in Tamaulipas, Mexico. Josephine Comstock immigrated to the United States in 1892 and became one of the first Mexican students to enroll and graduate from Indiana University in 1917. She was also one of the first women to specifically graduate from the nursing school program offered by the University. Riley attended public schools, graduating from Northwestern High School. She attended Wayne State University, where she earned a B.A. in 1946. She received an LL.B. degree from Wayne State University Law School in 1949.

As soon as she graduated from law school, Riley interviewed with law firms. However, since women lawyers at the time were uncommon, the qualifications for a job were focused on typing ability and speed. Interviewers advised her to work in a steno pool or as a legal secretary instead of a lawyer. Riley then began her own practice in the Detroit area from 1949 to 1955 with the help of other attorneys, including her husband, Wallace D. Riley, whom she married in 1967. Her husband was a former president of the state bar of Michigan and the American Bar Association. In 1956, she served as Wayne County Friend of the Court. Riley then founded and worked for the law firm, Riley and Roumell, in 1968.

In 1972, Riley became a Wayne County Circuit Judge. In 1976, she became the first woman to serve on the Michigan Court of Appeals. Two years later, in 1978, she was elected to the court of appeals for a full term (six years) after being appointed by Governor William Milliken to fill a vacancy.

== Michigan Supreme Court controversy ==
Riley ran for one of the two contested seats on the Supreme Court of Michigan in 1982. During this electoral race, she lost to Justice Blair Moody and her colleague from the court of appeals, Judge Michael Cavanagh. Three weeks later, on November 26, Justice Blair Moody suddenly died. This led Republican Governor William Milliken to announce on December 9, 1982, his appointment to replace Justice Moody with Justice Riley. However, according to Article VI of Michigan's 1963 Constitution, Riley would only be able to be in office until noon on January 1, 1985. This is because when someone is appointed to fill a vacancy, their term lasts only until midday on January 1 after the first statewide general election that occurred following the creation of that vacancy.

This appointment became the subject of a partisan controversy. Governor Milliken was also leaving office in less than a month, and newly elected Democratic governor James Blanchard argued he should be allowed to make the appointment to replace Moody rather than Milliken. Furthermore, before his death, Justice Moody had almost a month left on his term before it ended. This led the Democratic Party to complain that Riley’s term should end on the same day Moody’s term would have ended on January 1, 1983. The dispute over her legality in court resulted in a lawsuit against Riley that claimed she was no longer a justice, which had been filed against her by the Michigan attorney general. In February 1983, the other Supreme Court Justices voted to remove Riley from the court, after a split decision on party lines, voting 4-2. Blanchard replaced her with U.S. District Court Judge Patricia Boyle.

However, Riley ran again for Supreme Court Justice and won the election in 1984, beating an incumbent justice who voted to have her removed. She served as chief justice from 1987 to 1991, becoming the first Hispanic woman to do so on any state supreme court. After her first term, she was reelected for another term in 1992. However, Riley retired from the Court on September 1, 1997, due to the onset of Parkinson's disease. Governor Engler appointed Judge Clifford Taylor in the place of Justice Riley.

== Later life and honors ==
Following her retirement, Riley received the 1997 NAWL President’s Award for distinguished Lifetime service, with many thanking and attributing her devoted work on the court. In 1991, she was inducted into the Michigan Women's Hall of Fame, and the State Bar of Michigan presented Riley with its Distinguished Public Servant Award in 2000. A year before her death, the Michigan Supreme Court Historical Society awarded her the Legal History Award. Riley was also the founder, along with her husband, and Honorary Chair of the Michigan Supreme Court Historical Society.

Riley and Wallace had one son, Peter Comstock Riley.

On October 23, 2004, she died in her home in Grosse Pointe Farms, age 79, from her complications of Parkinson's disease.

== See also ==
- List of Hispanic and Latino American jurists
- List of first women lawyers and judges in Michigan
