= Wayne State University Law School =

Public law school in Detroit, Michigan, US

Coordinates: 42°21′37.8″N 83°04′15.4″W

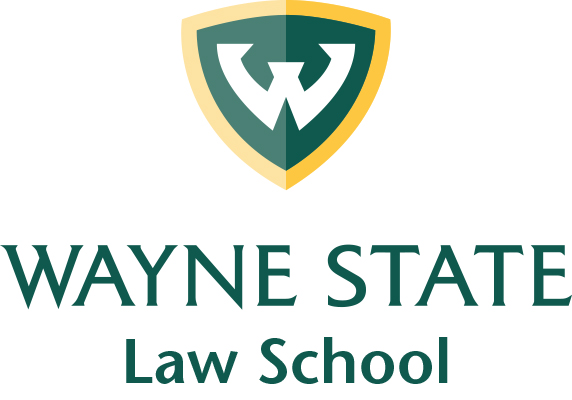
- Established: 1927; 99 years ago
- School type: Public
- Dean: Richard Bierschbach
- Location: Detroit, Michigan, U.S.
- USNWR ranking: 71st (tie) (2025)
- Website: law.wayne.edu
- ABA profile: Standard 509 Report

Wayne State University Law School (also known as Wayne Law) is the law school of Wayne State University in the Midtown neighborhood of Detroit, Michigan, United States. Founded in 1927, the law school offers juris doctor (J.D.), master of laws (LL.M.), online master of studies in law, and minors in law degree programs.

== History ==
The Law School was founded in 1927 and originally named the Detroit City Law School as part of the City Colleges of Detroit. Allan Campbell served as the Law School's founding dean, which graduated its first class with the bachelor of laws (LL.B.) degree in 1928.

The City Colleges of Detroit were renamed Wayne University in 1933. In 1956, the university joined Michigan State University and the University of Michigan as one of the state's three major public research institutions and was renamed Wayne State University.

The Law School received full American Bar Association (ABA) accreditation in 1939. The school's Moot Court program (originally called the Case Club) was established in 1938, and the Wayne Law Review began publication in 1954. As an additional honor, members of the Wayne Law Review were awarded Juris Doctor (J.D.) degrees rather than LL.B. degrees (J.D. degrees were awarded to all law students with an undergraduate degree beginning in 1965). In 1965, the Law School's students founded the Free Legal Aid Clinic, which is now operated in conjunction with Lakeshore Legal Aid and Neighborhood Legal Services.

At the urging of the ABA and the State Bar of Michigan Board of Commissioners, Wayne State University Law School and the University of Michigan Law School joined to form the Institute of Continuing Legal Education in 1960.

== List of deans ==
Deans of the Law School have included Allan Campbell (1927–37), Arthur Neef (1937-66), Charles Joiner (1968–75), Donald Gordon (1975–80), John Roberts (1980–87), John Reed (1987–93), James Robinson (1993–98), Joan Mahoney (1998-04; first female law school dean in Michigan history), Frank Wu (2004–08), Robert Ackerman (2008-12) and Jocelyn Benson (interim 2012-14; permanent 2014-16). Richard Bierschbach became dean on Aug. 17, 2017.

== Academics ==
=== Admissions ===
For the class entering in fall 2019, the Law School had 434 students, including 395 full-time students and 39 part-time students; 132 degrees and certificates were conferred in 2018-19. The Law School had 38 full-time faculty during this period. For the 2021 first year class (Oct 6th 2020-Oct 5th 2021), 32.87% of applicants were admitted and, of those admitted, 39.81% enrolled, with the average enrolled student having an LSAT score of 161 and an undergraduate GPA of 3.75.

=== Degree options ===
Wayne Law offers six different degree options.

==== J.D. program ====
Wayne Law offers three J.D. program options for students. They include a full-time day program, a combined day and evening program, and a part-time evening program.

==== Online Master of Studies in Law ====
Wayne Law's online Master of Studies in Law (MSL) degree is specifically designed to help specialists in human resources expand their knowledge of legal principles and the U.S. legal system.

==== LL.M. program ====
Lawyers who already have earned a J.D. degree from an accredited U.S. law school or an equivalent degree in another country and satisfy Wayne Law's LL.M. admissions criteria are eligible to undertake advanced legal studies for a LL.M. degree at Wayne Law. LL.M. majors include Corporate and Finance Law, Labor and Employment Law, and Taxation.

==== Joint J.D./LL.M. program ====
Wayne Law’s joint J.D./LL.M. degree program allows students to earn both a J.D. and LL.M. in only seven semesters, rather than the eight semesters that would usually be required for a full-time student to complete both a J.D. degree (in three years) and an LL.M. degree (in one year).

==== Dual degree options ====
Wayne Law offers dual degree programs allowing students to earn both a J.D. and a master’s degree. Students can earn a master’s in one of the following disciplines in conjunction with other schools at Wayne State:

- Business administration – Mike Ilitch School of Business
- Criminal justice – Department of Criminal Justice, College of Liberal Arts and Sciences
- Dispute resolution – Department of Communication, College of Fine, Performing and Communication Arts
- Economics – Department of Economics, College of Liberal Arts and Sciences
- History – History Department, College of Liberal Arts and Sciences
- Political science – Political Science Department, College of Liberal Arts and Sciences

==== Minor in Law ====
Wayne State University undergraduate students can earn a minor in law. The Minor in Law is available through four WSU schools and colleges:

- College of Fine, Performing and Communication Arts
- College of Liberal Arts and Sciences
- Mike Ilitch School of Business
- School of Social Work

=== Clinics ===
Wayne Law operates eight clinics. The clinics provide hands-on casework to law students while simultaneously assisting residents of the metro Detroit community.

- Appeal and Post-Conviction Advocacy Clinic (formerly the Criminal Appellate Practice Clinic)
- Asylum and Immigration Law Clinic, in partnership with Michigan's State Appellate Defender Office
- Business and Community Law Clinic
- Community Advocacy Clinic
- Disability Law Clinic
- Immigration Appellate Advocacy Clinic
- Legal Advocacy for People with Cancer Clinic, a medical-legal partnership with Barbara Ann Karmanos Cancer Institute
- Patent Procurement Clinic, a legal partnership with Brooks Kushman Law Firm

The Legal Advocacy for People with Cancer Clinic was named one of the nation's most innovative law school clinics by The National Jurist .

=== Academic journals ===
Academic journals at Wayne Law include:

==== The Journal of Law in Society ====
Founded in 1997, The Journal of Law in Society is a student-managed publication of Wayne Law that provides scholarly discourse on the intersection of law and society. It is the scholarly arm of the Damon J. Keith Center for Civil Rights at Wayne Law.

==== Journal of Business Law ====
Established in 2017, the Journal of Business Law is a scholarly peer-reviewed journal operated and edited by students at Wayne Law.

==== Wayne Law Review ====
The Wayne Law Review contains articles, book reviews, transcripts, notes and comments by prominent academics, practitioners and students on timely legal topics.

=== Externships ===
Externships are an academic program that allows students to earn credit for work at an approved placement with a court, nonprofit organization, state or federal agency, or in-house counsel program.

Wayne Law offers three externship programs and a Free Legal Aid Clinic to J.D. and LL.M. students:

- Corporate Counsel Externship
- Judicial Externship
- Public Service Externship
- Public Service 2 Externship: Social Justice Lawyering

== Centers and programs ==
=== Damon J. Keith Center for Civil Rights ===
In 2011, Wayne Law opened the Damon J. Keith Center for Civil Rights at Wayne Law, named for Judge Damon J. Keith of the U.S. Court of Appeals for the Sixth Circuit, an alumnus of the Law School. The Keith Center addresses the civil rights needs of southeast Michigan and the nation by promoting the educational, economic and political power of underrepresented communities in urban settings. The Detroit Equity Action Lab at the Keith Center is funded by $2.9 million from the W.K. Kellogg Foundation. The center is also home to the Damon J. Keith Collection of African-American Legal History.

=== Levin Center for Oversight and Democracy ===
In 2015, The Levin Center for Oversight and Democracy was established and named for former U.S. Sen. Carl Levin. The Levin Center educates future attorneys, business leaders, legislators and public servants on their role overseeing public and private institutions and using oversight as an instrument of change.

=== Program for International Legal Studies ===
The Program for International Legal Studies is the focal point for all international activity at Wayne Law. Its study abroad programs and international fellowships give students a first-hand view of other nations' legal systems and approaches to legal education.

== Ranking and honors ==
The National Jurist and prelaw magazine have recognized Wayne Law as a Best Value Law School for seven years in a row, beginning in 2014. Wayne Law has been the only Michigan law school to be listed several times.

In 2018, prelaw magazine recognized Wayne Law as one of the best law schools in the nation for practical training.

U.S. News & World Report’s rankings for 2023 placed Wayne Law No. 58 overall, No. 35 in clinical training and No. 17 in part-time law programs.

== Employment and costs ==
=== Employment numbers ===
According to Wayne Law’s ABA-required disclosures for the class of 2019, 85.1% of graduates were employed in full-time, long-term positions that require bar passage or are J.D. advantage within ten months of graduation. Wayne Law’s overall employment rate for the class of 2019 was 88.6%. Wayne Law is No. 51 nationally and No. 2 in Michigan for placing recent graduates in full-time, long-term jobs that require bar passage or for which a J.D. is an advantage.

=== Cost of attendance ===
Fall 2020 J.D. and LL.M. program tuition
Category	Cost per credit hour
Resident	$1,055.56
Non-resident	$1,158
Registration fee	$315.70
Student service fee	$54.56

Resident tuition is available to Michigan residents and those who qualify for the university's Good Neighbor Program, including residents of Ontario, Canada, or the contiguous counties of Ohio (Fulton, Lucas, Ottawa, and Williams counties).

== Notable alumni ==
- William Davidson (J.D. 1949, former owner of the Detroit Pistons, Detroit Shock and Tampa Bay Lightning)
- Dorothy Comstock Riley (LL.B. 1949, former Michigan Supreme Court chief justice)
- Damon Keith (LL.M. 1956, former senior judge of the United States Court of Appeals for the Sixth Circuit)
- John Conyers (J.D. 1958, U.S. Congressman, former chairman of the House Judiciary Committee)
- Annice M. Wagner (J.D. 1962, former chief judge of the District of Columbia Court of Appeals)
- Stephen M. Ross (J.D. 1965, founder, chairman and majority owner of The Related Companies LP)
- Arthur Tarnow (J.D. 1965, senior judge of the United States District Court for the Eastern District of Michigan)
- Sam Bernstein (J.D. 1968, Michigan-famed attorney, founder of The Law Offices of Sam Bernstein)
- Marilyn Jean Kelly (J.D. 1971, former Michigan Supreme Court chief justice)
- Nancy Garlock Edmunds (J.D. 1976, senior judge of the United States District Court for the Eastern District of Michigan)
- David M. Lawson (J.D. 1976, judge of the United States District Court for the Eastern District of Michigan)
- Marcia Cooke (J.D. 1977, judge of the United States District Court for the Southern District of Florida)
- Susan Bieke Neilson (J.D. 1980, former judge of the United States Court of Appeals for the Sixth Circuit)
- Jim Haadsma (J.D. 1984, member of the Michigan House of Representatives representing the 44th district)
- Karen Batchelor (J.D. 1985, lawyer, genealogist, and first African-American member of the Daughters of the American Revolution)
- Dan Gilbert (J.D. 1987, owner of the Cleveland Cavaliers and Quicken Loans)
- Gary Peters (J.D. 1989, United States senator)
- Lynn N. Rivers (J.D. 1992, U.S. congressman)
- Megan Kathleen Cavanagh (J.D. 2000, Michigan Supreme Court justice)

== Notable faculty ==
- Jocelyn Benson, expert on civil rights law, education law, and election law; former Wayne Law dean
- Marilyn Jean Kelly, distinguished jurist in residence; former Michigan Supreme Court chief justice
- Carl Levin, former U.S. senator; Chair of Levin Center; distinguished legislator in residence, Wayne Law
- Gerald Ellis Rosen, chief judge of the U.S. District Court for the Eastern District of Michigan
- Robert Sedler, civil rights figure, and first general counsel of the ACLU of Kentucky
- Steven Winter, Walter S. Gibbs Professor of Constitutional Law and distinguished professor
- Brad R. Roth, professor of political science and law
