= Terrence Berg =

American judge (born 1959)

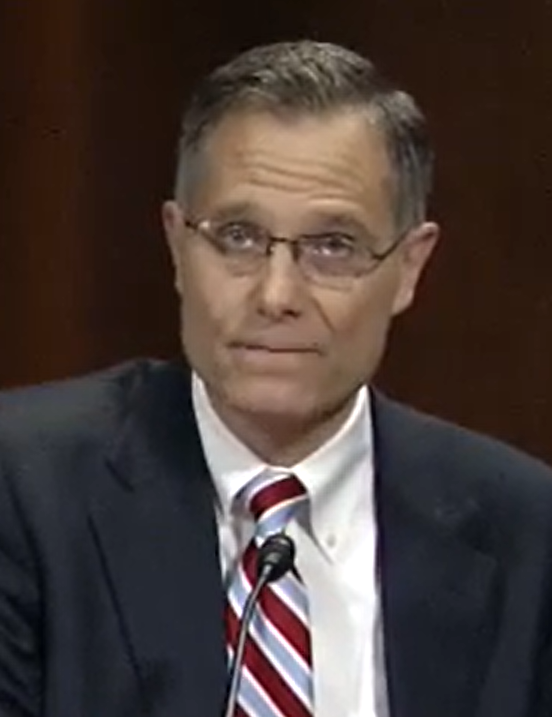

Judge of the United States District Court for the Eastern District of Michigan
- Incumbent
- Assumed office December 7, 2012
- Appointed by: Barack Obama
- Preceded by: Arthur Tarnow (Note: His portrait hangs in Judge Berg's courtroom.)

Personal details
- Born: August 1959 (age 66) Detroit, Michigan, U.S.
- Education: Georgetown University (BS, JD)

Terrence George Berg (born August 1959) is a United States district judge of the United States District Court for the Eastern District of Michigan.

== Biography ==
Berg was born in Detroit, and raised in Madison Heights, Michigan until he was 8 years old. His family moved to Grosse Pointe Park, Michigan where he graduated from Grosse Pointe South High School in 1977.

Berg received his Bachelor of Science degree, magna cum laude, from Georgetown University in 1981. He received his Juris Doctor, cum laude, from Georgetown University Law Center in 1986. He served with distinction as the Editor-in-Chief of the Georgetown Journal of International Law (formerly known as Law and Policy in International Business). He served as a law clerk to Judge Anthony Alaimo of the United States District Court for the Southern District of Georgia from 1986 to 1987. He was an associate at the law firm of Debevoise & Plimpton from 1987 to 1989. He served as an Assistant United States Attorney from 1989 to 2012, except for a period from 1999 to 2003 when he served as Chief of the High Tech Crime Unit at the Michigan Department of the Attorney General. From 2008 to 2010, he served as interim United States Attorney. In 2010, he was detailed to be Acting First Assistant United States Attorney in the Middle District of Georgia. Beginning in 2011, until the time of his nomination to the United States District Court for the Eastern District of Michigan, he was detailed to be the Professional Misconduct Review Unit at the Office of the Deputy Attorney General, United States Department of Justice.

Berg taught courses at the U.S. Department of Justice's National Advocacy Center, in Columbia, South Carolina and the FBI Academy in Quantico, Virginia. He has been a trainer for various prosecuting attorney’s associations. He taught a Computer Crime Seminar and also Trial Practice from 1994-2012 as an adjunct professor for the University of Detroit Mercy School of Law. (Note: "Berg has taught a Computer Crime Seminar and also Trial Practice as an adjunct professor for the University of Detroit-Mercy School of Law from 1994-2012. He has also taught courses at the U.S. Department of Justice's National Advocacy Center, in Columbia, South Carolina, the FBI Academy in Quantico, Virginia, and the Prosecuting Attorney's Associations of Michigan, Ohio, North Carolina, and Utah. He has spoken at conferences sponsored by the National Association of Attorney's General, in Washington, D.C., the National White Collar Crime Center, in Fairmont, West Virginia, and the National Center for Justice and the Rule of Law, at the University of Mississippi, Oxford, Mississippi. He has also trained prosecutors in Bangkok, Thailand, Sofia, Bulgaria, and Cebu, Philippines. His writings have appeared in law reviews, state bar publications, and national magazines.")

He worked in the Michigan Attorney General office under Jennifer Granholm. His special interest there was “a unit dedicated to fighting Internet crime in Michigan.” Berg offered that, “When I was a prosecutor, I always enjoyed the fraud cases, because it was a more complicated investigation and you had to prove the person had the intent to commit a crime.” He thereafter returned to the U.S. Attorney’s office for the Eastern District of Michigan.

During his confirmation, he was candid about his views on the judicial role. (Note: "My judicial philosophy is to adhere to the rule of law and act with integrity in all things. Integrity in this sense means being intellectually honest, open-minded and rigorous; applying the law fairly, impartially, and consistently; giving all parties a full opportunity to be heard; treating all who come before the court with dignity and courtesy;and having the courage to do the right thing. In our constitutional system, the role of the judge is to provide a neutral and open forum in which all sides will be heard, decisions will be rendered promptly, consistent with the rule of law, and narrowly tailored to address the case or controversy at issue. ... The most important elements of judicial temperament are to be fair, impartial, timely, diligent, hardworking, patient, calm, decisive and respectful of the equal dignity of all persons who appear before the court.")

=== Federal judicial service ===
On April 25, 2012, President Barack Obama nominated Berg to be a United States District Judge for the United States District Court for the Eastern District of Michigan, to the seat vacated by Judge Arthur J. Tarnow. His nomination was forwarded by the Senate Judiciary Committee to the full United States Senate on July 12, 2012. The United States Senate voted to confirm Berg in a voice vote on December 6, 2012. He received his commission on December 7, 2012.

== Assault ==
On March 5, 2015 Judge Berg was shot in the leg during an attempted home robbery. The FBI offered a $25,000 for information leading to the arrest and conviction of those responsible for the shooting. Berg's family immediately asked for calm due to the situation. Berg underwent surgery to repair the damage to his leg.

After a period of intense rehabilitation for his knee, Judge Berg returned to service. He has since been involved in charitable events.

Legal offices
Preceded by Arthur Tarnow	Judge of the United States District Court for the Eastern District of Michigan; 2012–present	Incumbent
