= The Sam Bernstein Law Firm =

Law firm in Farmington Hills, Michigan

- Headquarters: Farmington Hills, Michigan and Grand Rapids, Michigan
- No. of offices: 2 offices
- No. of attorneys: Approximately 35 attorneys (2022)
- No. of employees: Approximately 115 employees (2014)
- Major practice areas: Personal Injury Law, Social Security Disability, Dog Bite, Automotive, Motorcycle, Medical Malpractice Law and Civil Rights
- Key people: Sam Bernstein, Mark Bernstein, Beth Bernstein
- Date founded: 1968
- Founder: Sam Bernstein
- Company type: Law Firm
- Website: www.callsam.com

The Sam Bernstein Law Firm, formerly known as The Law Offices of Sam Bernstein and The Law Offices of Samuel I. Bernstein, is an American law firm, located in Farmington Hills, Michigan. The firm specializes in personal injury. In 2008, its main office employed approximately 50 employees.

== History ==
The firm was founded in 1968 by Sam Bernstein, a graduate of Mumford High School.

Mark and Beth Bernstein currently work at The Sam Bernstein Law Firm, but Richard H. Bernstein left the firm following his 2014 election as a justice to the Michigan Supreme Court.

== Notable cases ==
=== Detroit Department of Transportation ===
The Sam Bernstein Law Firm filed a suit against the city of Detroit on behalf of five disabled Detroit residents, claiming that half of the city's buses lacked working wheelchair lifts as required by federal law. The plaintiffs stated that they were forced to wait in inclement weather for long periods as a result of this violation. The U.S. Department of Justice later intervened in the case, forcing the city to settle the lawsuit. The agreement, ordered by the US Department of Justice on 4 November 2005, required the city to test the wheelchair lifts of its buses daily, improve the training of its drivers and mechanics, and subject its buses to surprise evaluations.

=== University of Michigan – Michigan Stadium ===
The firm handled a case on behalf of the Michigan Paralyzed Veterans of America against the University of Michigan claiming that Michigan Stadium violated the Americans with Disabilities Act in its $226-million renovation by failing to add enough seats for disabled fans or accommodate the needs for disabled restrooms, concessions, and parking. The U.S. Department of Justice assisted in the suit, which was settled in March 2008. The consent decree, signed by U.S. District Court Judge Sean Cox required the stadium to add 329 wheelchair seats throughout the stadium by 2010, and an additional 135 accessible seats in clubhouses to go along with the existing 88 wheelchair seats. The school also will enhance the wheelchair accessibility of parking, access routes, restrooms, concessions and other amenities. Player locker rooms and coaches' offices were also made accessible for disabled journalists.

=== Road Commission for Oakland County ===
The firm filed a federal lawsuit on behalf of three disabled Oakland County, Michigan residents. The suit claimed that the plan by the Road Commission for Oakland County to install roundabouts at three different West Bloomfield, Michigan intersections didn't comply with the Americans with Disabilities Act of 1990 and prevented disabled pedestrians from being able to move freely throughout the area. The suit claimed that roundabouts are unsafe for blind and disabled pedestrians. The case came to an agreement in March 2008 for the installation of roundabout safety equipment at each location at each entry point of the roundabout. If the safety equipment fails, the community may face a federal mandate to tear out the roundabout.

=== Northwest Airlines and Wayne County Airport Authority ===
The firm represented five disabled passengers in a suit filed against Northwest Airlines (NWA) and Wayne County Airport Authority, claiming that NWA and the Airport Authority violated the Americans with Disabilities Act of 1990, the Carrier Act, and the Rehabilitation Act. The suit alleged that Detroit Metro Airport and NWA have dropped passengers to the floor, denied them accessible parking, damaged wheelchairs, and failed to provide an area for guide dogs to relieve themselves. Further, the suit alleged that Detroit Metro Airport could be in violation of federal laws developed to improve access for the physically disabled.

On 3 September 2008, U.S. District Court Judge George Caram Steeh III ruled that the ADA applies to air carriers. According to expert Gary Talbot of Boston, formerly of the U.S. Access Board, the ruling means floor slopes, boarding platforms, counter heights, bathrooms, how wheelchairs are handled, and anything pertaining to Metro Airport must comply with ADA architectural guidelines.

On 27 September 2011, an order in U.S. District Court in Detroit resolved approximately 60 disputed items within the lawsuit had reached settlement. The order was signed by Judge Steeh, Delta Air Lines (which became part of the suit when it purchased Northwest Airlines during the time of the lawsuit) and the Airport Authority to make significant modifications to bring them into compliance with the Americans with Disabilities Act laws. The order covered changes to Detroit Metro Airport's McNamara Terminal, North Terminal, parking garages, the Westin Hotel and airport shuttle buses. The court also ruled that the airlines and airport authority violated the Americans with Disabilities Act by not providing an accessible path from an elevator discharge area to a pedestrian bridge at the airport in Romulus, southwest of Detroit.

The lawsuit was dismissed as part of the agreement for upgrades, and the airport and airline did not admit to wrongdoing or liability, as part of the agreement.

=== American Bar Association ===
The Sam Bernstein Law Firm filed a suit against the American Bar Association (ABA) on behalf of legally blind school applicant Angelo Binno, a resident of West Bloomfield, Michigan. The complaint alleges that by pushing law schools to use the Law School Admission Test (LSAT) in its accreditation rules, the ABA imposes an inequitable test requiring "spatial reasoning and the ability to diagram" that discriminates against blind and visually impaired students. The suit alleges that the ABA is thereby failing to comply with the Americans with Disabilities Act of 1990. The suit sought injunctive and declaratory relief as well as a waiver from the Law School Admission Test (LSAT) for Binno due to his visual impairment.

=== The International Triathlon Union, USA Triathlon, and 3-D Racing ===
The Sam Bernstein Law Firm represented Aaron Scheidies, a 7-time world champion and 8-time national champion world-class runner, in a suit filed in federal court against The International Triathlon Union, USA Triathlon and 3-D Racing claiming the organizations violated the Americans with Disabilities Act of 1990. The suit claimed that the triathlon groups' rule, adopted in March 2010, requiring vision-impaired runners wear blackout glasses in competition was discriminatory and dangerous. Officials from the triathlon group said the rule was put in place to equalize the competition among the blind competitors and allowed the triathlon's inclusion in the 2016 Paralympic Games in Rio de Janeiro.

The case was resolved in August 2012 when Judge Patrick J. Duggan ruled that no blackout glasses were to be worn by any visually impaired athlete and the defendants agreed to have Scheidies help rewrite the rules of accommodation in races for the visually impaired. The rules were required to be finalized by October 2012.

=== City of New York and New York City Department of Transportation ===
The firm filed a suit in federal court against the City of New York and the New York City Department of Transportation, claiming Central Park is inaccessible to blind, visually impaired and disabled visitors because of an unregulated roadway surrounding the park, which visitors to the park must cross to enter. The complaint additionally claimed that New York City was infringing the Americans with Disabilities Act of 1990 by failing to prevent reckless cyclists from using the roadways. The lawsuit asked the city to draw up a plan to make Central Park safe for people with disabilities.

The lawsuit was prompted after a speeding cyclist struck Richard Bernstein while he was walking in Central Park in August 2012. The cyclist was traveling at 35 mph, 10 mph over the speed limit. Bernstein fell face-first onto the asphalt and suffered facial abrasions requiring surgery, tooth damage and a broken and dislocated hip.

=== Opioid Lawsuit ===
In November 2017, it was announced that Mark Bernstein had been retained (along with Weitz & Luxenberg P.C.) to represent Wayne County, Oakland County, Delta County, Saginaw County, Grand Traverse County, and the cities of Detroit and Lansing in a lawsuit against pharmaceutical companies over marketing tactics and the sale of opioid pain killers. In December 2017, it was announced that Genesee County had also retained the lawyers in connection to the lawsuit.

== Notable lawyers ==
=== Mark Bernstein ===
Mark Bernstein served in the White House Press Office as the White House director of press pool operations during the Clinton administration. Mark was appointed to the Michigan Civil Rights Commission by Gov. Jennifer Granholm in 2004. His term completed at the end of 2006. He lectures on legal practice, civil rights and political activism at the University of Michigan Law School and the University of Michigan College of Literature, Science, and the Arts. In November 2012, he was selected by statewide election to serve on the University of Michigan's Board of Regents.

=== Richard Bernstein ===
Richard Bernstein has been blind since birth as a result of retinitis pigmentosa.

Bernstein taught as an adjunct professor at the University of Michigan-Ann Arbor and served on the Wayne State University Board of Governors for one eight-year term, including two years as vice chair and two more as chair, until deciding not to seek re-election in 2010. He was featured on CNN as a leader in "Keeping Them Honest" and was selected by Crain's Detroit Business as one of "40 Under 40." In 2009, Bernstein was named a "Leader in the Law" by Michigan Lawyers Weekly for his work in disabled rights advocacy. In 2010, Richard ran for Attorney General in the State of Michigan but lost the Michigan Democratic Party endorsement to David Leyton.

In 2014, Richard was elected to the Michigan Supreme Court becoming its first blind justice on January 1, 2015, at which time he left the firm.
