= Emelia Christine Schaub =

American lawyer (1891–1995)

Emelia Christine Schaub (1891–1995) was a lawyer who was Michigan's first elected woman prosecutor, the first woman in the United States to successfully defend a murder trial.

== Early life and education ==
She was born in a log cabin in Centerville Township, Leelanau County, Michigan, in 1891. Schaub was the daughter of Provemont pioneers Simon and Freida Schaub and attended St. Mary School.

== Career ==
She became the first Leelanau County woman to practice law upon her graduation from Detroit College of Law in 1924. Later earning a masters of Law degree from the University of Detroit. In 1926, news accounts cited her as the first woman attorney in the nation's history to successfully defend a murder case. When asked if the client was guilty, she said, " Of course, but technicalities you know." The client was convicted of Bank Robbery as the get away driver but not murder for shooting the guard.

Schaub was elected to the first of six terms as Leelanau county prosecutor in 1936 to the first of five two-year terms, followed by a sixth term from 1952 to 1954. She was Michigan's first woman to be elected and to serve as county prosecutor.

While in that office she arranged for the return of Ottawa and Chippewa lands from the state to Leelanau County, creating a de facto reservation. For her efforts, she was made an honorary member of the tribe in 1942. Possession of this land base helped the Grand Traverse Band of Ottawa and Chippewa Indians (Ojibwe) achieve federal recognition in 1980.

Long active in her profession and community, she served as secretary and treasurer of the Women Lawyers Association of Michigan and helped found both the Leelanau Foundation and the Leelanau Historic Society.

She died in April 1995.

== Honors ==
Emelia Schaub was elected to the Michigan Women's Hall of Fame in 1990 and was named a champion of justice of the state bar of Michigan the following year. A park and lake access point, Emelia's Landing or Emelia's Dock, bears her name. A six-ton granite boulder outside the county building in Leland also bears her name.

The Emelia C. Schaub Pioneer Award was established in 2021 in her honor.

== See also ==
- State Bar of Michigan
