= 2018 San Diego Padres season =

2018 San Diego Padres
- League: National League
- Division: West
- Ballpark: Petco Park
- City: San Diego, California
- Record: 66–96 (.407)
- Divisional place: 5th
- Owners: Ron Fowler
- General managers: A. J. Preller
- Managers: Andy Green
- Television: Fox Sports San Diego (Don Orsillo, Mark Grant, Mike Pomeranz, Mark Sweeney, Jesse Agler); Fox Deportes San Diego (Spanish)
- Radio: KWFN 97.3 FM (Ted Leitner, Jesse Agler); XEMO 860 AM (Spanish) (Eduardo Ortega, Carlos Hernandez, Pedro Gutierrez)

The 2018 San Diego Padres season was the 50th season of the San Diego Padres franchise. The Padres played their home games at Petco Park as members of Major League Baseball's National League West. The Padres finished with a record of 66–96, and in 5th place in the National League West.

== Offseason ==
On December 12, 2017, the first day of the MLB Winter Meetings, the Padres traded Jabari Blash to the New York Yankees for Chase Headley and Bryan Mitchell. This will be Headley's second stint with the Padres, having played with them to start his career. To make room in the 40-man roster for both players, the Padres traded Ryan Schimpf to the Tampa Bay Rays for minor leaguer Deion Tansel.

On February 19, 2018, the Padres signed free agent 1B Eric Hosmer to an 8-year, $144 million contract. This was the largest contract in franchise history.

== Roster ==
2018 San Diego Padres
Roster
| Pitchers: 77 Buddy Baumann; 54 Colten Brewer; 65 José Castillo; 90 Adam Cimber; 43 Miguel Díaz; 41 Robbie Erlin; 52 Brad Hand; 59 Phil Hughes; 60 Brett Kennedy; 46 Eric Lauer; 62 Walker Lockett; 37 Joey Lucchesi; 27 Jordan Lyles; 53 Kazuhisa Makita; 88 Phil Maton; 44 Kyle McGrath; 50 Bryan Mitchell; 63 Jacob Nix; 61 Luis Perdomo; 3 Clayton Richard; 38 Tyson Ross; 34 Craig Stammen; 66 Robert Stock; 55 Matt Strahm; 40 Tyler Webb; 40 Rowan Wick; 57 Brad Wieck; 58 Trey Wingenter; 39 Kirby Yates | Catchers: 17 A. J. Ellis; 18 Austin Hedges; 0 Rafael Lopez; 27 Francisco Mejía; Infielders: 20 Carlos Asuaje; 13 Freddy Galvis; 70,8 Javy Guerra; 12 Chase Headley; 30 Eric Hosmer; 2 José Pirela; 15 Cory Spangenberg; 9 Luis Urías; 22 Christian Villanueva | Outfielders: 33 Franchy Cordero; 16 Travis Jankowski; 7 Manuel Margot; 4 Wil Myers; 10 Hunter Renfroe; 32 Franmil Reyes; 23 Matt Szczur | Manager: 14 Andy Green; Coaches: 36 Darren Balsley (pitching); 81 Griffin Benedict (bullpen catcher); 45 Doug Bochtler (bullpen); 48 Justin Hatcher (bullpen catcher); 26 Glenn Hoffman (third base); 1 Josh Johnson (infield); 25 Mark McGwire (bench); 5 Skip Schumaker (first base); 47 Matt Stairs (hitting); 28 Johnny Washington (assistant hitting) |

== Player stats ==
=== Batting ===
Note: G = Games played; AB = At bats; R = Runs; H = Hits; 2B = Doubles; 3B = Triples; HR = Home runs; RBI = Runs batted in; SB = Stolen bases; BB = Walks; AVG = Batting average; SLG = Slugging average

| Player | G | AB | R | H | 2B | 3B | HR | RBI | SB | BB | AVG | SLG |
|---|---|---|---|---|---|---|---|---|---|---|---|---|
| Eric Hosmer | 157 | 613 | 72 | 155 | 31 | 2 | 18 | 69 | 7 | 62 | .253 | .398 |
| Freddy Galvis | 162 | 602 | 62 | 149 | 31 | 5 | 13 | 67 | 8 | 45 | .248 | .380 |
| Manuel Margot | 141 | 477 | 50 | 117 | 26 | 8 | 8 | 51 | 11 | 32 | .245 | .384 |
| José Pirela | 146 | 438 | 54 | 109 | 23 | 2 | 5 | 32 | 6 | 30 | .249 | .345 |
| Hunter Renfroe | 117 | 403 | 53 | 100 | 23 | 1 | 26 | 68 | 2 | 30 | .248 | .504 |
| Christian Villanueva | 110 | 351 | 42 | 83 | 15 | 0 | 20 | 46 | 3 | 23 | .236 | .450 |
| Travis Jankowski | 117 | 347 | 45 | 90 | 12 | 3 | 4 | 17 | 24 | 37 | .259 | .346 |
| Wil Myers | 83 | 312 | 39 | 79 | 25 | 1 | 11 | 39 | 13 | 30 | .253 | .446 |
| Austin Hedges | 91 | 303 | 29 | 70 | 14 | 2 | 14 | 37 | 3 | 21 | .231 | .429 |
| Cory Spangenberg | 116 | 298 | 35 | 70 | 9 | 4 | 7 | 25 | 6 | 25 | .235 | .362 |
| Franmil Reyes | 87 | 261 | 36 | 73 | 9 | 0 | 16 | 31 | 0 | 24 | .280 | .498 |
| Carlos Asuaje | 79 | 189 | 15 | 37 | 8 | 1 | 2 | 19 | 1 | 24 | .196 | .280 |
| A. J. Ellis | 66 | 151 | 19 | 41 | 8 | 0 | 1 | 15 | 0 | 26 | .272 | .344 |
| Franchy Cordero | 40 | 139 | 19 | 33 | 5 | 1 | 7 | 19 | 5 | 14 | .237 | .439 |
| Raffy Lopez | 37 | 102 | 11 | 18 | 2 | 0 | 3 | 13 | 1 | 13 | .176 | .284 |
| Matt Szczur | 57 | 75 | 11 | 14 | 3 | 0 | 1 | 6 | 3 | 8 | .187 | .267 |
| Francisco Mejía | 20 | 54 | 6 | 10 | 2 | 0 | 3 | 8 | 0 | 3 | .185 | .389 |
| Chase Headley | 27 | 52 | 2 | 6 | 1 | 0 | 0 | 4 | 0 | 6 | .115 | .135 |
| Luis Urías | 12 | 48 | 5 | 10 | 1 | 0 | 2 | 5 | 1 | 3 | .208 | .354 |
| Javy Guerra | 13 | 16 | 2 | 2 | 0 | 0 | 0 | 1 | 0 | 3 | .125 | .125 |
| Pitcher totals | 162 | 255 | 10 | 23 | 2 | 0 | 1 | 11 | 1 | 12 | .090 | .110 |
| Team totals | 162 | 5486 | 617 | 1289 | 250 | 30 | 162 | 583 | 95' | 471 | .235 | .380 |

=== Pitching ===
Note: W = Wins; L = Losses; ERA = Earned run average; G = Games pitched; GS = Games started; SV = Saves; IP = Innings pitched; H = Hits allowed; R = Runs allowed; ER = Earned runs allowed; BB = Walks allowed; SO = Strikeouts

| Player | W | L | ERA | G | GS | SV | IP | H | R | ER | BB | SO |
|---|---|---|---|---|---|---|---|---|---|---|---|---|
| Clayton Richard | 7 | 11 | 5.33 | 27 | 27 | 0 | 158.2 | 159 | 98 | 94 | 60 | 108 |
| Joey Lucchesi | 8 | 9 | 4.08 | 26 | 26 | 0 | 130.0 | 125 | 63 | 59 | 43 | 145 |
| Tyson Ross | 6 | 9 | 4.45 | 22 | 22 | 0 | 123.1 | 112 | 64 | 61 | 52 | 107 |
| Eric Lauer | 6 | 7 | 4.34 | 23 | 23 | 0 | 112.0 | 127 | 61 | 54 | 46 | 100 |
| Robbie Erlin | 4 | 7 | 4.21 | 39 | 12 | 0 | 109.0 | 112 | 57 | 51 | 12 | 88 |
| Craig Stammen | 8 | 3 | 2.73 | 73 | 0 | 0 | 79.0 | 65 | 25 | 24 | 17 | 88 |
| Bryan Mitchell | 2 | 4 | 5.42 | 16 | 11 | 0 | 73.0 | 85 | 45 | 44 | 43 | 38 |
| Jordan Lyles | 2 | 4 | 4.29 | 24 | 8 | 0 | 71.1 | 71 | 35 | 34 | 19 | 62 |
| Kirby Yates | 5 | 3 | 2.14 | 65 | 0 | 12 | 63.0 | 41 | 15 | 15 | 17 | 90 |
| Matt Strahm | 3 | 4 | 2.05 | 41 | 5 | 0 | 61.1 | 39 | 16 | 14 | 21 | 69 |
| Adam Cimber | 3 | 5 | 3.17 | 42 | 0 | 0 | 48.1 | 42 | 19 | 17 | 10 | 51 |
| Phil Maton | 0 | 2 | 4.37 | 45 | 0 | 0 | 47.1 | 50 | 25 | 23 | 23 | 55 |
| Luis Perdomo | 1 | 6 | 7.05 | 12 | 10 | 0 | 44.2 | 62 | 37 | 35 | 22 | 39 |
| Brad Hand | 2 | 4 | 3.05 | 41 | 0 | 24 | 44.1 | 33 | 21 | 15 | 15 | 65 |
| Jacob Nix | 2 | 5 | 7.02 | 9 | 9 | 0 | 42.1 | 52 | 33 | 33 | 13 | 21 |
| Robert Stock | 1 | 1 | 2.50 | 32 | 0 | 0 | 39.2 | 37 | 13 | 11 | 13 | 38 |
| José Castillo | 3 | 3 | 3.29 | 37 | 0 | 0 | 38.1 | 23 | 14 | 14 | 12 | 52 |
| Kazuhisa Makita | 0 | 1 | 5.40 | 27 | 0 | 0 | 35.0 | 32 | 23 | 21 | 12 | 37 |
| Brett Kennedy | 1 | 2 | 6.75 | 6 | 6 | 0 | 26.2 | 36 | 20 | 20 | 12 | 18 |
| Phil Hughes | 0 | 0 | 6.10 | 16 | 0 | 0 | 20.2 | 30 | 14 | 14 | 5 | 24 |
| Trey Wingenter | 0 | 0 | 3.79 | 22 | 0 | 0 | 19.0 | 13 | 8 | 8 | 11 | 27 |
| Miguel Díaz | 1 | 0 | 4.82 | 11 | 0 | 0 | 18.2 | 16 | 11 | 10 | 12 | 30 |
| Walker Lockett | 0 | 3 | 9.60 | 4 | 3 | 0 | 15.0 | 22 | 16 | 16 | 10 | 12 |
| Colten Brewer | 1 | 0 | 5.59 | 11 | 0 | 0 | 9.2 | 15 | 10 | 6 | 7 | 10 |
| Rowan Wick | 0 | 1 | 6.48 | 10 | 0 | 0 | 8.1 | 13 | 6 | 6 | 1 | 7 |
| Brad Wieck | 0 | 0 | 1.29 | 5 | 0 | 0 | 7.0 | 3 | 1 | 1 | 0 | 10 |
| Tyler Webb | 0 | 1 | 12.60 | 4 | 0 | 0 | 5.0 | 6 | 7 | 7 | 3 | 4 |
| Kyle McGrath | 0 | 0 | 4.50 | 4 | 0 | 0 | 4.0 | 3 | 2 | 2 | 3 | 4 |
| Cory Spangenberg | 0 | 0 | 13.50 | 2 | 0 | 0 | 2.0 | 4 | 3 | 3 | 3 | 0 |
| Buddy Baumann | 0 | 1 | 54.00 | 1 | 0 | 0 | 0.1 | 2 | 5 | 2 | 2 | 0 |
| Team totals | 66 | 96 | 4.40 | 162 | 162 | 36 | 1457.0 | 1430 | 767 | 713 | 519 | 1399 |

== Season standings ==
=== National League West ===
NL West
| Team | W | L | Pct. | GB | Home | Road |
|---|---|---|---|---|---|---|
| Los Angeles Dodgers | 92 | 71 | .564 | — | 45‍–‍37 | 47‍–‍34 |
| Colorado Rockies | 91 | 72 | .558 | 1 | 47‍–‍34 | 44‍–‍38 |
| Arizona Diamondbacks | 82 | 80 | .506 | 9½ | 40‍–‍41 | 42‍–‍39 |
| San Francisco Giants | 73 | 89 | .451 | 18½ | 42‍–‍39 | 31‍–‍50 |
| San Diego Padres | 66 | 96 | .407 | 25½ | 31‍–‍50 | 35‍–‍46 |

=== National League Wildcard ===
Division leaders
| Team | W | L | Pct. |
|---|---|---|---|
| Milwaukee Brewers | 96 | 67 | .589 |
| Los Angeles Dodgers | 92 | 71 | .564 |
| Atlanta Braves | 90 | 72 | .556 |

Wild Card teams (Top 2 teams qualify for postseason)
| Team | W | L | Pct. | GB |
|---|---|---|---|---|
| Chicago Cubs | 95 | 68 | .583 | +4 |
| Colorado Rockies | 91 | 72 | .558 | — |
| St. Louis Cardinals | 88 | 74 | .543 | 2½ |
| Pittsburgh Pirates | 82 | 79 | .509 | 8 |
| Arizona Diamondbacks | 82 | 80 | .506 | 8½ |
| Washington Nationals | 82 | 80 | .506 | 8½ |
| Philadelphia Phillies | 80 | 82 | .494 | 10½ |
| New York Mets | 77 | 85 | .475 | 13½ |
| San Francisco Giants | 73 | 89 | .451 | 17½ |
| Cincinnati Reds | 67 | 95 | .414 | 23½ |
| San Diego Padres | 66 | 96 | .407 | 24½ |
| Miami Marlins | 63 | 98 | .391 | 27 |

=== Record vs. opponents ===
2018 National League record Source: MLB Standings Grid – 2018
| Team | AZ | ATL | CHC | CIN | COL | LAD | MIA | MIL | NYM | PHI | PIT | SD | SF | STL | WSH | AL |
|---|---|---|---|---|---|---|---|---|---|---|---|---|---|---|---|---|
| Arizona | — | 3–4 | 3–4 | 3–3 | 8–11 | 11–8 | 6–1 | 1–5 | 2–5 | 4–2 | 6–1 | 12–7 | 8–11 | 3–3 | 2–5 | 10–10 |
| Atlanta | 4–3 | — | 3–3 | 3–4 | 2–5 | 2–5 | 14–5 | 3–4 | 13–6 | 12–7 | 5–1 | 4–3 | 3–3 | 4–2 | 10–9 | 8–12 |
| Chicago | 4–3 | 3–3 | — | 11–8 | 3–3 | 4–3 | 5–2 | 11–9 | 6–1 | 4–2 | 10–9 | 5–2 | 3–3 | 9–10 | 4–3 | 13–7 |
| Cincinnati | 3–3 | 4–3 | 8–11 | — | 2–4 | 6–1 | 2–5 | 6–13 | 3–3 | 3–4 | 5–14 | 3–4 | 4–2 | 7–12 | 1–6 | 10–10 |
| Colorado | 11–8 | 5–2 | 3–3 | 4–2 | — | 7–13 | 2–4 | 2–5 | 6–1 | 5–2 | 3–3 | 11–8 | 12–7 | 2–5 | 5–2 | 13–7 |
| Los Angeles | 8–11 | 5–2 | 3–4 | 1–6 | 13–7 | — | 2–4 | 4–3 | 4–2 | 3–4 | 5–1 | 14–5 | 10–9 | 3–4 | 5–1 | 12–8 |
| Miami | 1–6 | 5–14 | 2–5 | 5–2 | 4–2 | 4–2 | — | 2–5 | 7–12 | 8–11 | 1–4 | 2–5 | 4–3 | 3–3 | 6–13 | 9–11 |
| Milwaukee | 5–1 | 4–3 | 9–11 | 13–6 | 5–2 | 3–4 | 5–2 | — | 4–3 | 3–3 | 7–12 | 4–2 | 6–1 | 11–8 | 4–2 | 13–7 |
| New York | 5–2 | 6–13 | 1–6 | 3–3 | 1–6 | 2–4 | 12–7 | 3–4 | — | 11–8 | 3–4 | 4–2 | 4–3 | 3–3 | 11–8 | 8–12 |
| Philadelphia | 2–4 | 7–12 | 2–4 | 4–3 | 2–5 | 4–3 | 11–8 | 3–3 | 8–11 | — | 6–1 | 3–3 | 4–3 | 4–3 | 8–11 | 12–8 |
| Pittsburgh | 1–6 | 1–5 | 9–10 | 14–5 | 3–3 | 1–5 | 4–1 | 12–7 | 4–3 | 1–6 | — | 3–4 | 4–3 | 8–11 | 2–5 | 15–5 |
| San Diego | 7–12 | 3–4 | 2–5 | 4–3 | 8–11 | 5–14 | 5–2 | 2–4 | 2–4 | 3–3 | 4–3 | — | 8–11 | 4–3 | 2–4 | 7–13 |
| San Francisco | 11–8 | 3–3 | 3–3 | 2–4 | 7–12 | 9–10 | 3–4 | 1–6 | 3–4 | 3–4 | 3–4 | 11–8 | — | 2–5 | 4–2 | 8–12 |
| St. Louis | 3–3 | 2–4 | 10–9 | 12–7 | 5–2 | 4–3 | 3–3 | 8–11 | 3–3 | 3–4 | 11–8 | 3–4 | 5–2 | — | 5–2 | 11–9 |
| Washington | 5–2 | 9–10 | 3–4 | 6–1 | 2–5 | 1–5 | 13–6 | 2–4 | 8–11 | 11–8 | 5–2 | 4–2 | 2–4 | 2–5 | — | 9–11 |

The October 1 tiebreaker games were regular-season games that are included here.

== Game log ==
2018 game log: 66–96 (Home: 31–50; Away: 35–46)
March: 0–3 (Home: 0–3; Away: 0–0)

| # | Date | Opponent | Score | Win | Loss | Save | Attendance | Record | Streak |
|---|---|---|---|---|---|---|---|---|---|
| 1 | March 29 | Brewers | 1–2 (12) | Jeffress (1–0) | **Cimber** (0–1) | Barnes (1) | 44,649 | 0–1 | L1 |
| 2 | March 30 | Brewers | 6–8 | Drake (1–0) | **Hand** (0–1) | Knebel (1) | 31,513 | 0–2 | L2 |
| 3 | March 31 | Brewers | 3–7 | Suter (1–0) | **Perdomo** (0–1) | — | 35,106 | 0–3 | L3 |

April: 10–17 (Home: 5–9; Away: 5–8)

| # | Date | Opponent | Score | Win | Loss | Save | Attendance | Record | Streak |
|---|---|---|---|---|---|---|---|---|---|
| 4 | April 2 | Rockies | 4–7 | Bettis (1–0) | **Mitchell** (0–1) | Davis (2) | 16,899 | 0–4 | L4 |
| 5 | April 3 | Rockies | 8–4 | **Ross** (1–0) | Freeland (0–1) | **Hand** (1) | 19,283 | 1–4 | W1 |
| 6 | April 4 | Rockies | 2–5 | Gray (1–1) | **Richard** (0–1) | Davis (3) | 19,698 | 1–5 | L1 |
| 7 | April 5 | Rockies | 1–3 | Ottavino (1–0) | **Hand** (0–2) | Davis (4) | 20,509 | 1–6 | L2 |
| 8 | April 6 | @ Astros | 4–1 | **Perdomo** (1–1) | McCullers Jr. (1–1) | **Hand** (2) | 41,138 | 2–6 | W1 |
| 9 | April 7 | @ Astros | 0–1(10) | Devenski (1–0) | **Erlin** (0–1) | — | 42,306 | 2–7 | L1 |
| 10 | April 8 | @ Astros | 1–4 | Morton (2–0) | **Ross** (1–1) | Peacock (1) | 37,093 | 2–8 | L2 |
| 11 | April 9 | @ Rockies | 7–6 | **Richard** (1–1) | Gray (1–2) | **Hand** (3) | 20,291 | 3–8 | W1 |
| 12 | April 10 | @ Rockies | 5–2 | **Lucchesi** (1–0) | Shaw (1–1) | **Hand** (4) | 22,446 | 4–8 | W2 |
| 13 | April 11 | @ Rockies | 4–6 | Senzatela (1–1) | **Baumann** (0–1) | Davis (5) | 21,248 | 4–9 | L1 |
| 14 | April 12 | Giants | 0–7 | Stratton (1–1) | **Mitchell** (0–2) | — | 22,288 | 4–10 | L2 |
| 15 | April 13 | Giants | 5–1 | **Ross** (2–1) | Blach (1–2) | **Hand** (5) | 31,675 | 5–10 | W1 |
| 16 | April 14 | Giants | 5–4 | **Cimber** (1–1) | Gearrin (0–1) | **Hand** (6) | 41,117 | 6–10 | W2 |
| 17 | April 15 | Giants | 10–1 | **Lucchesi** (2–0) | Beede (0–1) | — | 34,316 | 7–10 | W3 |
| 18 | April 16 | Dodgers | 3–10 | Ryu (2–0) | **Erlin** (0–2) | — | 23,082 | 7–11 | L1 |
| 19 | April 17 | Dodgers | 3–7(10) | Alexander (1–0) | **Webb** (0–1) | — | 22,959 | 7–12 | L2 |
| 20 | April 18 | Dodgers | 4–13 | Maeda (2–1) | **Perdomo** (1–2) | — | 23,748 | 7–13 | L3 |
| 21 | April 20 | @ Diamondbacks | 4–1 | **Hand** (1–2) | Boxberger (0–2) | — | 24,902 | 8–13 | W1 |
| 22 | April 21 | @ Diamondbacks | 2–6 | Godley (3–1) | **Richard** (1–2) | — | 38,820 | 8–14 | L1 |
| 23 | April 22 | @ Diamondbacks | 2–4 | Corbin (4–0) | **Lucchesi** (2–1) | Bradley (2) | 31,061 | 8–15 | L2 |
| 24 | April 23 | @ Rockies | 13–5 | **Erlin** (1–2) | McGee (0–1) | — | 24,419 | 9–15 | W1 |
| 25 | April 24 | @ Rockies | 0–8 | Freeland (1–3) | **Lauer** (0–1) | — | 23,727 | 9–16 | L1 |
| 26 | April 25 | @ Rockies | 2–5 | Gray (2–4) | **Ross** (2–2) | — | 32,989 | 9–17 | L2 |
| 27 | April 27 | Mets | 1–5 | deGrom (3–0) | **Richard** (1–3) | — | 29,977 | 9–18 | L3 |
| 28 | April 28 | Mets | 12–2 | **Lucchesi** (3–1) | Vargas (0–1) | — | 42,778 | 10–18 | W1 |
| 29 | April 29 | Mets | 2–14 | Wheeler (2–1) | **Mitchell** (0–3) | — | 34,639 | 10–19 | L1 |
| 30 | April 30 | @ Giants | 5–6 | Johnson (1–1) | **Hand** (1–3) | — | 35,470 | 10–20 | L2 |

May: 15–13 (Home: 9–7; Away: 6–6)

| # | Date | Opponent | Score | Win | Loss | Save | Attendance | Record | Streak |
|---|---|---|---|---|---|---|---|---|---|
| 31 | May 1 | @ Giants | 3–2 | **Yates** (1–0) | Strickland (2–1) | **Hand** (7) | 36,735 | 11–20 | W1 |
| 32 | May 2 | @ Giants | 4–9 | Holland (1–3) | **Richard** (1–4) | — | 36,475 | 11–21 | L1 |
| 33 | May 4 | Dodgers | 0–4 | Buehler (2–0) | **Lucchesi** (3–2) | — | 21,536 | 11–22 | L2 |
| 34 | May 5 | Dodgers | 7–4 | **Yates** (2–0) | Fields (2–1) | **Hand** (8) | 21,791 | 12–22 | W1 |
| 35 | May 6 | Dodgers | 3–0 | **Lauer** (1–1) | Cingrani (0–2) | **Hand** (9) | 21,789 | 13–22 | W2 |
| 36 | May 7 | Nationals | 5–8 | Strasburg (4–3) | **Ross** (2–3) | — | 17,296 | 13–23 | L1 |
| 37 | May 8 | Nationals | 0–4 | Hellickson (1–0) | **Richard** (1–5) | — | 18,989 | 13–24 | L2 |
| 38 | May 9 | Nationals | 2–1 | **Stammen** (1–0) | Gott (0–2) | **Hand** (10) | 18,804 | 14–24 | W1 |
| 39 | May 10 | Cardinals | 1–2 | Mikolas (5–0) | **Lyles** (0–1) | Bud Norris (8) | 20,515 | 14–25 | L1 |
| 40 | May 11 | Cardinals | 5–9 | Weaver (3–2) | **Lauer** (1–2) | — | 28,207 | 14–26 | L2 |
| 41 | May 12 | Cardinals | 2–1 (13) | **Cimber** (2–1) | Brebbia (0–1) | — | 32,715 | 15–26 | W1 |
| 42 | May 13 | Cardinals | 5–3 | **Richard** (2–5) | Wainwright (1–3) | **Hand** (11) | 28,183 | 16–26 | W2 |
| 43 | May 14 | Rockies | 4–6 | Anderson (3–1) | **Makita** (0–1) | Davis (15) | 17,245 | 16–27 | L1 |
| 44 | May 15 | Rockies | 4–0 | **Lyles** (1–1) | Marquez (2–5) | **Hand** (12) | 19,598 | 17–27 | W1 |
| 45 | May 17 | @ Pirates | 4–5 | Santana (2–0) | **Strahm** (0–1) | Vázquez (9) | 11,404 | 17–28 | L1 |
| 46 | May 18 | @ Pirates | 3–2 | **Ross** (3–3) | Nova (2–4) | **Hand** (13) | 18,920 | 18–28 | W1 |
| 47 | May 19 | @ Pirates | 6–2 | **Richard** (3–5) | Kingham (2–1) | — | 20,578 | 19–28 | W2 |
| 47 | May 20 | @ Pirates | 8–5 | **Yates** (3–0) | Vázquez (2–1) | **Hand** (14) | 17,783 | 20–28 | W3 |
| 49 | May 21 | @ Nationals | 2–10 | González (5–2) | **Erlin** (1–3) | — | 27,890 | 20–29 | L1 |
| 50 | May 22 | @ Nationals | 1–2 | Doolittle (2–2) | **Strahm** (0–2) | — | 25,700 | 20–30 | L2 |
| 51 | May 23 | @ Nationals | 3–1 | **Ross** (4–3) | Fedde (0–1) | **Hand** (15) | 31,076 | 21–30 | W1 |
| 52 | May 25 | @ Dodgers | 1–4 | Stripling (2–1) | **Richard** (3–6) | Jansen (11) | 44,612 | 21–31 | L1 |
| 53 | May 26 | @ Dodgers | 7–5 | **Stammen** (2–0) | Hudson (1–1) | **Hand** (16) | 43,920 | 22–31 | W1 |
| 54 | May 27 | @ Dodgers | 1–6 | Buehler (3–1) | **Cimber** (2–2) | — | 46,650 | 22–32 | L1 |
| 55 | May 28 | Marlins | 2–7 | Smith (4–5) | **Lauer** (1–3) | — | 27,932 | 22–33 | L2 |
| 56 | May 29 | Marlins | 9–5 | **Stammen** (3–0) | Straily (2–1) | — | 16,321 | 23–33 | W1 |
| 57 | May 30 | Marlins | 3–2 | **Strahm** (1–2) | Ziegler (0–5) | — | 15,449 | 24–33 | W2 |
| 58 | May 31 | Marlins | 8–3 | **Lyles** (2–1) | Chen (1–3) | **Hand** (17) | 17,373 | 25–33 | W3 |

June: 12–15 (Home: 5–5; Away: 7–10)

| # | Date | Opponent | Score | Win | Loss | Save | Attendance | Record | Streak |
|---|---|---|---|---|---|---|---|---|---|
| 59 | June 1 | Reds | 2–7 | Mahle (4–6) | **Lockett** (0–1) | Lorenzen (1) | 25,729 | 25–34 | L1 |
| 60 | June 2 | Reds | 8–2 | **Lauer** (2–3) | Harvey (1–4) | — | 31,710 | 26–34 | W1 |
| 61 | June 3 | Reds | 6–3 | **Ross** (5–3) | Castillo (4–6) | **Yates** (1) | 25,377 | 27–34 | W2 |
| 62 | June 4 | Braves | 11–4 | **Richard** (4–6) | Teherán (4–4) | — | 19,419 | 28–34 | W3 |
| 63 | June 5 | Braves | 1–14 | Newcomb (7–1) | **Lyles** (2–2) | Jackson (1) | 21,049 | 28–35 | L1 |
| 64 | June 6 | Braves | 3–1 | **Castillo** (1–0) | Foltynewicz (5–4) | **Hand** (18) | 20,898 | 29–35 | W1 |
| 65 | June 8 | @ Marlins | 0–4 | Smith (5–6) | **Lauer** (2–4) | — | 10,654 | 29–36 | L1 |
| 66 | June 9 | @ Marlins | 5–4 | **Stammen** (4–0) | Rucinski (1–1) | **Yates** (2) | 12,089 | 30–36 | W1 |
| 67 | June 10 | @ Marlins | 3–1 | **Richard** (5–6) | Ureña (1–8) | **Hand** (19) | 12,984 | 31–36 | W2 |
| 68 | June 11 | @ Cardinals | 2–5 | Flaherty (3–2) | **Lyles** (2–3) | Norris (13) | 40,971 | 31–37 | L1 |
| 69 | June 12 | @ Cardinals | 4–2 | **Cimber** (3–2) | Mikolas (7–2) | **Hand** (20) | 40,199 | 32–37 | W1 |
| 70 | June 13 | @ Cardinals | 4–2 | **Lauer** (3–4) | Weaver (3–6) | **Hand** (21) | 44,094 | 33–37 | W2 |
| 71 | June 14 | @ Braves | 2–4 | Sánchez (3–0) | **Ross** (5–4) | Vizcaíno (13) | 25,250 | 33–38 | L1 |
| 72 | June 15 | @ Braves | 9–3 | **Richard** (6–6) | Freeman (1–3) | — | 41,497 | 34–38 | W1 |
| 73 | June 16 | @ Braves | 0–1 | Newcomb (8–2) | **Lyles** (2–4) | Vizcaíno (14) | 41,916 | 34–39 | L1 |
| 74 | June 17 | @ Braves | 1–4 | Teherán (5–4) | **Castillo** (1–1) | Vizcaíno (15) | 40,251 | 34–40 | L2 |
| 75 | June 19 | A's | 2–4 (10) | Trivino (4–1) | **Cimber** (3–3) | Treinen (16) | 37,485 | 34–41 | L3 |
| 76 | June 20 | A's | 4–12 | Montas (4–1) | **Lucchesi** (3–3) | — | 28,225 | 34–42 | L4 |
| 77 | June 21 | @ Giants | 0–3 | Bumgarner (1–2) | **Ross** (5–5) | Melancon (1) | 37,497 | 34–43 | L5 |
| 78 | June 22 | @ Giants | 6–2 | **Richard** (7–6) | Stratton (8–5) | — | 40,546 | 35–43 | W1 |
| 79 | June 23 | @ Giants | 3–5 | Moronta (3–1) | **Cimber** (3–4) | — | 40,348 | 35–44 | L1 |
| 80 | June 24 | @ Giants | 2–3 (11) | Blach (5–5) | **Hand** (1–4) | — | 39,230 | 35–45 | L2 |
| 81 | June 25 | @ Rangers | 4–7 | Barnette (2–0) | **Stammen** (4–1) | Kela (19) | 23,470 | 35–46 | L3 |
| 82 | June 26 | @ Rangers | 3–2 | **Strahm** (2–2) | Diekman (1–1) | **Hand** (22) | | 36–46 | W1 |
| 83 | June 27 | @ Rangers | 2–5 | Minor (6–4) | **Richard** (7–7) | Kela (20) | 21,365 | 36–47 | L1 |
| 84 | June 29 | Pirates | 3–6 | Musgrove (3–3) | **Lauer** (3–5) | Vázquez (16) | 27,083 | 36–48 | L2 |
| 85 | June 30 | Pirates | 4–3 | **Lucchesi** (4–3) | Williams (6–6) | **Hand** (23) | 32,418 | 37–48 | W1 |

July: 5–20 (Home: 1–12; Away: 4–8)

| # | Date | Opponent | Score | Win | Loss | Save | Attendance | Record | Streak |
|---|---|---|---|---|---|---|---|---|---|
| 86 | July 1 | Pirates | 5–7 | Crick (1–1) | **Ross** (5–6) | Vázquez (17) | 32,099 | 37–49 | L1 |
| 87 | July 3 | @ A's | 2–6 | Pagan (2–0) | **Richard** (7–8) | — | 29,925 | 37–50 | L2 |
| 88 | July 4 | @ A's | 2–4 | Trivino (7–1) | **Castillo** (1–2) | Treinen (22) | 14,408 | 37–51 | L3 |
| 89 | July 5 | @ Diamondbacks | 6–3 | **Lauer** (4–5) | Miller (0–3) | **Hand** (24) | 17,982 | 38–51 | W1 |
| 90 | July 6 | @ Diamondbacks | 4–3 | Godley (10–6) | **Lucchesi** (4–4) | Boxberger (21) | 25,128 | 38–52 | L1 |
| 91 | July 7 | @ Diamondbacks | 5–20 | Delgado (1–0) | **Ross** (5–7) | — | 27,091 | 38–53 | L2 |
| 92 | July 8 | @ Diamondbacks | 4–3 (16) | **Hand** (2–4) | Mathis (0–1) | — | 24,869 | 39–53 | W1 |
| 93 | July 9 | Dodgers | 2–8 | Kershaw (3–4) | **Perdomo** (1–3) | — | 28,110 | 39–54 | L1 |
| 94 | July 10 | Dodgers | 4–1 | **Lauer** (5–5) | Hill | — | 26,272 | 40–54 | W1 |
| 95 | July 11 | Dodgers | 2–4 | Maeda (6–5) | **Lucchesi** (4–5) | Jansen (25) | 26,448 | 40–55 | L1 |
| 96 | July 12 | Dodgers | 2–3 | Stripling (8–2) | **Ross** (5–8) | Jansen (26) | 29,595 | 40–56 | L2 |
| 97 | July 13 | Cubs | 4–5 (10) | Strop (4–1) | **Cimber** (3–5) | **Morrow** (21) | 38,988 | 40–57 | L3 |
| 98 | July 14 | Cubs | 6–11 | Hendricks (6–8) | **Perdomo** (1–4) | — | 38,837 | 40–58 | L4 |
| 99 | July 15 | Cubs | 4–7 | Lester (12–2) | **Lauer** (5–6) | Morrow (22) | 37,672 | 40–59 | L5 |
**89th All-Star Game in Washington, D.C.**
| 100 | July 20 | @ Phillies | 5–11 | Davis (1–0) | **Richard** (7–9) | — | 30,034 | 40–60 | L6 |
| – | July 21 | @ Phillies | Postponed (rain): Makeup date July 22 | | | | | | |
| 101 | July 22 (1) | @ Phillies | 10–2 | **Ross** (6–8) | Pivetta (6–8) | — | 29,392 | 41–60 | W1 |
| 102 | July 22 (2) | @ Phillies | 0–5 | Velasquez (6–8) | **Perdomo** (1–5) | — | 25,054 | 41–61 | L1 |
| 103 | July 23 | @ Mets | 3–2 | **Lucchesi** (5–5) | deGrom (5–5) | Yates (3) | 21,731 | 42–61 | W1 |
| 104 | July 24 | @ Mets | 3–6 | Wheeler (4–6) | **Lauer** (5–7) | — | 21,925 | 42–62 | L1 |
| 105 | July 25 | @ Mets | 4–6 | Oswalt (1–2) | **Richard** (7–10) | Swarzak (2) | 30,963 | 42–63 | L2 |
| 106 | July 27 | Diamondbacks | 2—6 | Greinke (12–5) | **Perdomo (1–6)** | — | 34,725 | 42–64 | L3 |
| 107 | July 28 | Diamondbacks | 4–9 | Bradley (3–2) | **Maton (0–1)** | — | 37,149 | 42–65 | L4 |
| 108 | July 29 | Diamondbacks | 4–5 | Buchholz (4–1) | **Lucchesi (5–6)** | Boxberger (25) | 32,529 | 42–66 | L5 |
| 109 | July 30 | Giants | 3–5 (12) | Smith (1–1) | **Strahm** (2–3) | — | 31,725 | 42–67 | L6 |
| 110 | July 31 | Giants | 2–3(10) | Watson (4–4) | **Maton** (0–2) | Smith (6) | 29,209 | 42–68 | L7 |

August: 12–15 (Home: 7–7; Away: 5–8)

| # | Date | Opponent | Score | Win | Loss | Save | Attendance | Record | Streak |
|---|---|---|---|---|---|---|---|---|---|
| 111 | August 2 | @ Cubs | 6–1 | **Erlin** (2–3) | Chavez (0–1) | — | 40,714 | 43–68 | W1 |
| 112 | August 3 | @ Cubs | 4–5 | Quintana (10–7) | **Ross** (6–9) | Strop (6) | 40,894 | 43–69 | L1 |
| 113 | August 4 | @ Cubs | 4–5 | Hendricks (8–9) | **Lockett** (0–2) | Strop (7) | 40,855 | 43–70 | L2 |
| 114 | August 5 | @ Cubs | 10–6 | **Stammen** (5–1) | Edwards Jr. (3–2) | — | 41,136 | 44–70 | W1 |
| 115 | August 7 | @ Brewers | 11–5 | **Strahm** (3–3) | Hader (4–1) | — | 27,664 | 45–70 | W2 |
| 116 | August 8 | @ Brewers | 4–8 | Chacín (11–4) | **Kennedy** (0–1) | — | 32,355 | 45–71 | L1 |
| 117 | August 9 | @ Brewers | 8–4 | **Yates** (4–0) | Knebel (2–3) | — | 39,041 | 46-71 | W1 |
| 118 | August 10 | Phillies | 2–0 | **Nix** (1–0) | Eflin (8–4) | **Yates** (4) | 26,306 | 47-71 | W2 |
| 119 | August 11 | Phillies | 1–5 | Nola (13–3) | **Lockett** (0–3) | — | 35,098 | 47-72 | L1 |
| 120 | August 12 | Phillies | 9–3 | **Lucchesi** (6–6) | Arrieta (9–7) | — | 26,930 | 48–72 | W1 |
| 121 | August 13 | Angels | 3–6(10) | Bedrosian (4–2) | **Stammen** (5–2) | — | 22,609 | 48-73 | L1 |
| 122 | August 14 | Angels | 3–7 | Barría (8–7) | **Kennedy** (0–2) | — | 21,747 | 48–74 | L2 |
| 123 | August 15 | Angels | 2–3 | Alvarez (5–3) | **Yates** (4–1) | Parker (12) | 22,851 | 48-75 | L3 |
| 124 | August 16 | Diamondbacks | 1–5 | Buchholz (6–2) | **Nix** (1–1) | — | 20,617 | 48–76 | L4 |
| 125 | August 17 | Diamondbacks | 4–9 | Hirano (4–2) | **Lucchesi** (6–7) | — | 20,010 | 48–77 | L5 |
| 126 | August 18 | Diamondbacks | 7–6 | **Stammen** (6–2) | Chafin (1–4) | — | 24,440 | 49–77 | W1 |
| 127 | August 19 | Diamondbacks | 3–4 | Bradley (4–4) | **Yates** (4–2) | Boxberger (28) | 22,346 | 49–78 | L1 |
| 128 | August 21 | @ Rockies | 4–3 | **Erlin** (3–3) | Anderson (6–6) | **Yates** (5) | 27,862 | 50–78 | W1 |
| 129 | August 22 | @ Rockies | 2–6 | Gray (10–7) | **Nix** (1–2) | — | 28,966 | 50–79 | L1 |
| 130 | August 23 | @ Rockies | 3–4 | Rusin (1–2) | **Yates** (4–3) | — | 30,625 | 50–80 | L2 |
| 131 | August 24 | @ Dodgers | 1–11 | Hill (6–4) | **Richard** (7–11) | — | 47,559 | 50–81 | L3 |
| 132 | August 25 | @ Dodgers | 4–5(12) | Ferguson (4–2) | **Stock** (0–1) | — | 53,528 | 50–82 | L4 |
| 133 | August 26 | @ Dodgers | 3–7 | Ryu (4–1) | **Erlin** (3–4) | — | 43,252 | 50–83 | L5 |
| 134 | August 28 | Mariners | 2–1 | **Nix** (2–2) | Hernández (8–12) | **Yates** (6) | 25,168 | 51–83 | W1 |
| 135 | August 29 | Mariners | 8-3 | **Lucchesi** (7–7) | Ramírez (1–3) | — | 20,266 | 52–83 | W2 |
| 136 | August 30 | Rockies | 3–2(13) | **Stock** (1–1) | Shaw (4–6) | — | 20,056 | 53–83 | W3 |
| 137 | August 31 | Rockies | 7–0 | **Kennedy** (1–2) | Senzatela (4–5) | — | 21,408 | 54–83 | W4 |

September: 12–13 (Home: 4–7; Away: 8–6)

| # | Date | Opponent | Score | Win | Loss | Save | Attendance | Record | Streak |
|---|---|---|---|---|---|---|---|---|---|
| 138 | September 1 | Rockies | 2–4 | Gray (11–7) | **Erlin** (3–5) | Davis (37) | 35,779 | 54–84 | L1 |
| 139 | September 2 | Rockies | 3–7 | Freeland (13–7) | **Nix** (2–3) | — | 28,883 | 54–85 | L2 |
| 140 | September 3 | @ Diamondbacks | 6–2 | **Mitchell** (1–3) | Godley (14–8) | — | 22,514 | 55–85 | W1 |
| 141 | September 4 | @ Diamondbacks | 0–6 | Ray (5–2) | **Lucchesi** (7–8) | — | 18,556 | 55–86 | L1 |
| 142 | September 6 | @ Reds | 6–2 | **J. Castillo** (2–2) | L. Castillo (8–12) | — | 14,303 | 56–86 | W1 |
| 143 | September 7 | @ Reds | 6–12 | Lorenzen (3–1) | **Strahm** (3–4) | — | 14,854 | 56–87 | L1 |
| 144 | September 8 | @ Reds | 2–7 (7) | Harvey (7–8) | **Erlin** (3–6) | — | 20,977 | 56–88 | L2 |
| 145 | September 9 | @ Reds | 7–6 | **Stammen** (7–2) | Iglesias (2–4) | **Yates** (7) | 18,424 | 57–88 | W1 |
| 146 | September 11 | @ Mariners | 2–1 | **Stammen** (8–2) | Díaz (0–4) | **Yates** (8) | 13,388 | 58–88 | W2 |
| 147 | September 12 | @ Mariners | 5–4 | **Lucchesi** (8–8) | LeBlanc (8–4) | **Yates** (9) | 17,164 | 59–88 | W3 |
| 148 | September 14 | Rangers | 0–4 | Méndez (2–1) | **Erlin** (3–7) | — | 22,740 | 59–89 | L1 |
| 149 | September 15 | Rangers | 3–6 | Jurado (3–5) | **Castillo** (2–3) | Leclerc (11) | 28,833 | 59–90 | L2 |
| 150 | September 16 | Rangers | 7–3 | **Yates** (5–3) | Springs (0–1) | — | 22,242 | 60–90 | W1 |
| 151 | September 17 | Giants | 2–4 | Suárez (7–11) | **Mitchell** (1–4) | Smith (13) | 23,653 | 60–91 | L1 |
| 152 | September 18 | Giants | 4–5 | Dyson (4–3) | **Stammen** (8–3) | Smith (14) | 26,285 | 60–92 | L2 |
| 153 | September 19 | Giants | 8–4 | **Erlin** (4–7) | Stratton (10–10) | — | 31,933 | 61–92 | W1 |
| 154 | September 21 | @ Dodgers | 5–3 | **Lauer** (6–7) | Stripling (8–5) | **Yates** (10) | 52,458 | 62–92 | W2 |
| 155 | September 22 | @ Dodgers | 2–7 | Hill (10–5) | **Nix** (2–4) | — | 53,536 | 62–93 | L1 |
| 156 | September 23 | @ Dodgers | 0–14 | 'Ryu (6–3) | **Lucchesi** (8–9) | — | 50,250 | 62–94 | L2 |
| 157 | September 24 | @ Giants | 5–0 | **Mitchell** (2–4) | Holland (7–9) | **Yates** (11) | 35,428 | 63–94 | W1 |
| 158 | September 25 | @ Giants | 4–5 (12) | Melancon (1–3) | **Wick** (0–1) | — | 36,063 | 63–95 | L1 |
| 159 | September 26 | @ Giants | 3–2 | **Díaz** (1–0) | Kelly (0–3) | **Yates** (12) | 36,044 | 64–95 | W1 |
| 160 | September 28 | Diamondbacks | 3–2 (15) | **Brewer** (1–0) | Andriese (3–7) | — | 28,055 | 65–95 | W2 |
| 161 | September 29 | Diamondbacks | 4–5 | Godley (15–11) | **Nix** (2–5) | Hirano (3) | 28,024 | 65–96 | L1 |
| 162 | September 30 | Diamondbacks | 4–3 | **Castillo** (3–3) | Barrett (0–1) | — | 31,243 | 66–96 | W1 |

Legend: = Win = Loss = Postponement
Bold = Padres team member

== Farm system ==
Updated as of September 24, 2016

| Level | Team | League | Manager | W | L | Position |
|---|---|---|---|---|---|---|
| AAA | El Paso Chihuahuas | Pacific Coast League | | 82 | 57 | 1st |
| AA | San Antonio Missions | Texas League | | 71 | 67 | 2nd |
| High A | Lake Elsinore Storm | California League | | 68 | 72 | 3rd |
| A | Fort Wayne TinCaps | Midwest League | | 64 | 74 | 4th |
| A-Short Season | Tri-City Dust Devils | Northwest League | | 35 | 41 | 4th |
| Rookie | AZL Padres 1 | Arizona League | | 27 | 29 | 3rd |
| Rookie | AZL Padres 2 | Arizona League | | 26 | 30 | 4th |
| Rookie | DSL Padres | Dominican Summer League | | 37 | 35 | 4th |
