= Austin Hedges =

American baseball player (born 1992)

- Hedges with the Cleveland Guardians in 2022

Free agent
- Catcher
- Born: August 18, 1992 (age 34); San Juan Capistrano, California, U.S.
- Bats: Right Throws: Right

MLB debut
- May 4, 2015, for the San Diego Padres

MLB statistics (through 2026 season)
- Batting average: .190
- Home runs: 80
- Runs batted in: 273
- Stats at Baseball Reference

Teams
- San Diego Padres (2015–2020); Cleveland Indians / Guardians (2020–2022); Pittsburgh Pirates (2023); Texas Rangers (2023); Cleveland Guardians (2024–2026)

Career highlights and awards
- World Series champion (2023)

Austin Charles Hedges (born August 18, 1992) is an American professional baseball catcher who is a free agent. He has played in Major League Baseball (MLB) for the San Diego Padres, Cleveland Indians/Guardians, Pittsburgh Pirates and Texas Rangers, with whom he won the World Series in 2023.

== Early life ==
Hedges was born on August 18, 1992, in San Juan Capistrano, California, to Charlie and Pam Hedges. As an only child whose parents worked after he came home from school, Hedges spent large parts of his childhood throwing a lacrosse ball at a wall and catching it with his bare hand. His Little League Baseball team, the OC Aztecs, was coached by his father and produced six Major League Baseball (MLB) players. In addition to Hedges, Matt Chapman, Zach Davies, David Fletcher, Joe Musgrove, Michael Lorenzen, and Bryce Harper all played for the Aztecs.

== Professional career ==
=== Draft and minor leagues ===
Hedges was drafted by the San Diego Padres in the second round of the 2011 Major League Baseball draft out of JSerra Catholic High School in San Juan Capistrano, California. He had committed to UCLA, but signed with the Padres for $3 million.

Prior to the 2012 season, Baseball America ranked Hedges as the Padres fifth best prospect. Playing for the Fort Wayne TinCaps of the Midwest League, Hedges hit .279/.334/.451 with 10 home runs in 96 games. Scouts considered Hedges to be a stand-out defender who had surprised them with his batting at Class-A.

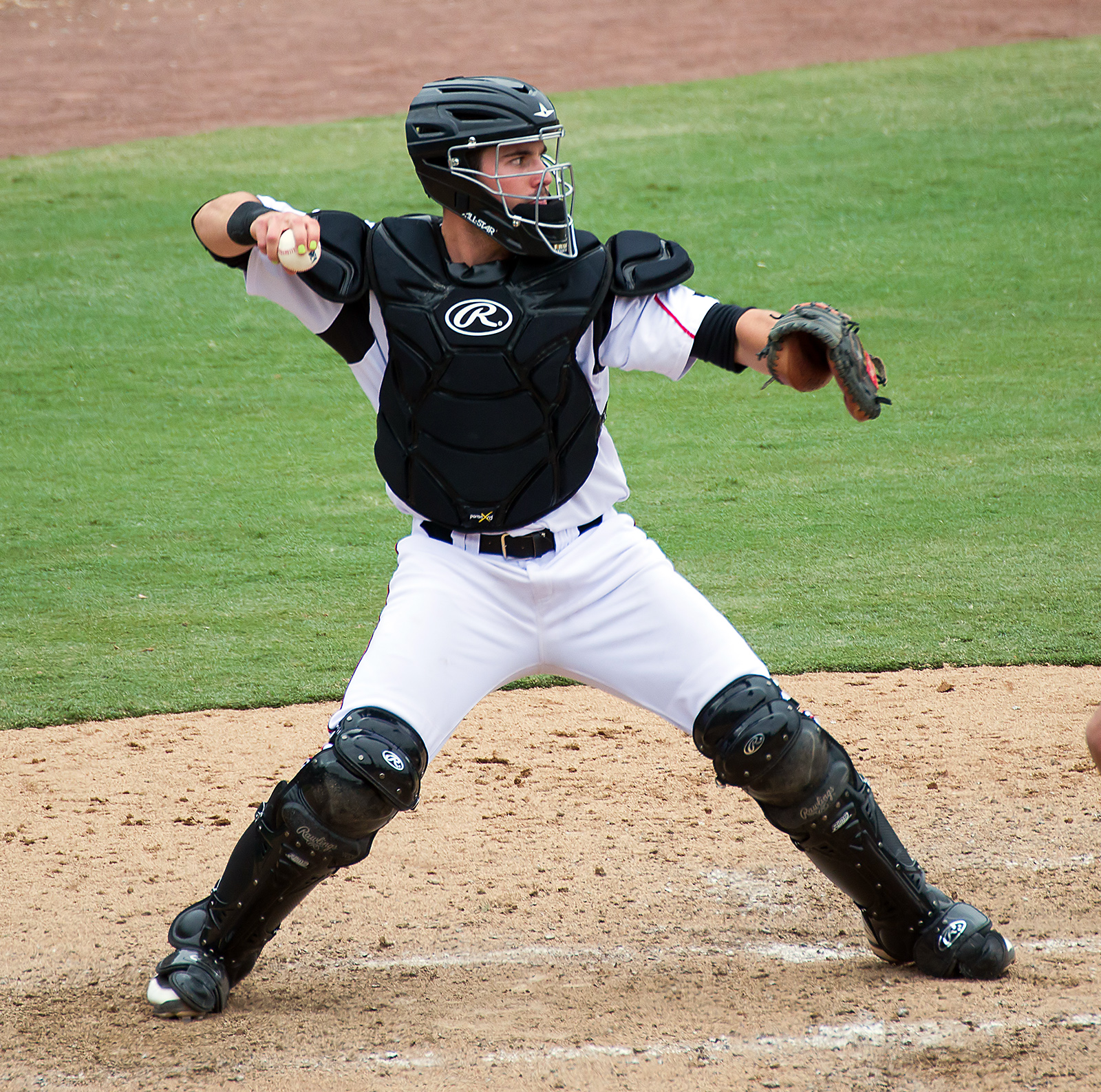
Hedges with the Lake Elsinore Storm in 2013

In 2013, MLB.com ranked Hedges the fourth best catching prospect in the minors. He started the year with the Class-A Advanced Lake Elsinore Storm where he hit .270 with four home runs in 66 games. He was promoted to the Double-A San Antonio Missions in August where he hit .224 in 20 games. He was also named to the All-Star Futures Game in 2013.

Hedges received a non-roster invitation to the big league spring training camp for the second time in 2014. He was ranked #27 on Baseball America's Top 100 Prospects list coming into the season. He spent the season with San Antonio, where he hit .225 with 6 home runs over 113 games while throwing out 38% of opposing base runners.

=== San Diego Padres ===
In 2015, Hedges joined the El Paso Chihuahuas of the Class AAA Pacific Coast League. The Padres promoted Hedges to the major leagues on May 4, bringing him up as a back-up to Derek Norris after designating Wil Nieves for assignment. Hedges had hit .324 with 2 home runs in 79 at-bats for the Chihuahuas. On May 6, Hedges notched his first Major League hit, an RBI single in the third inning of a game against the San Francisco Giants. He recorded 137 plate appearances during the 2015 season, hitting for a .168 batting average. In the offseason, Hedges played for the Leones del Escogido of the Dominican Winter League.

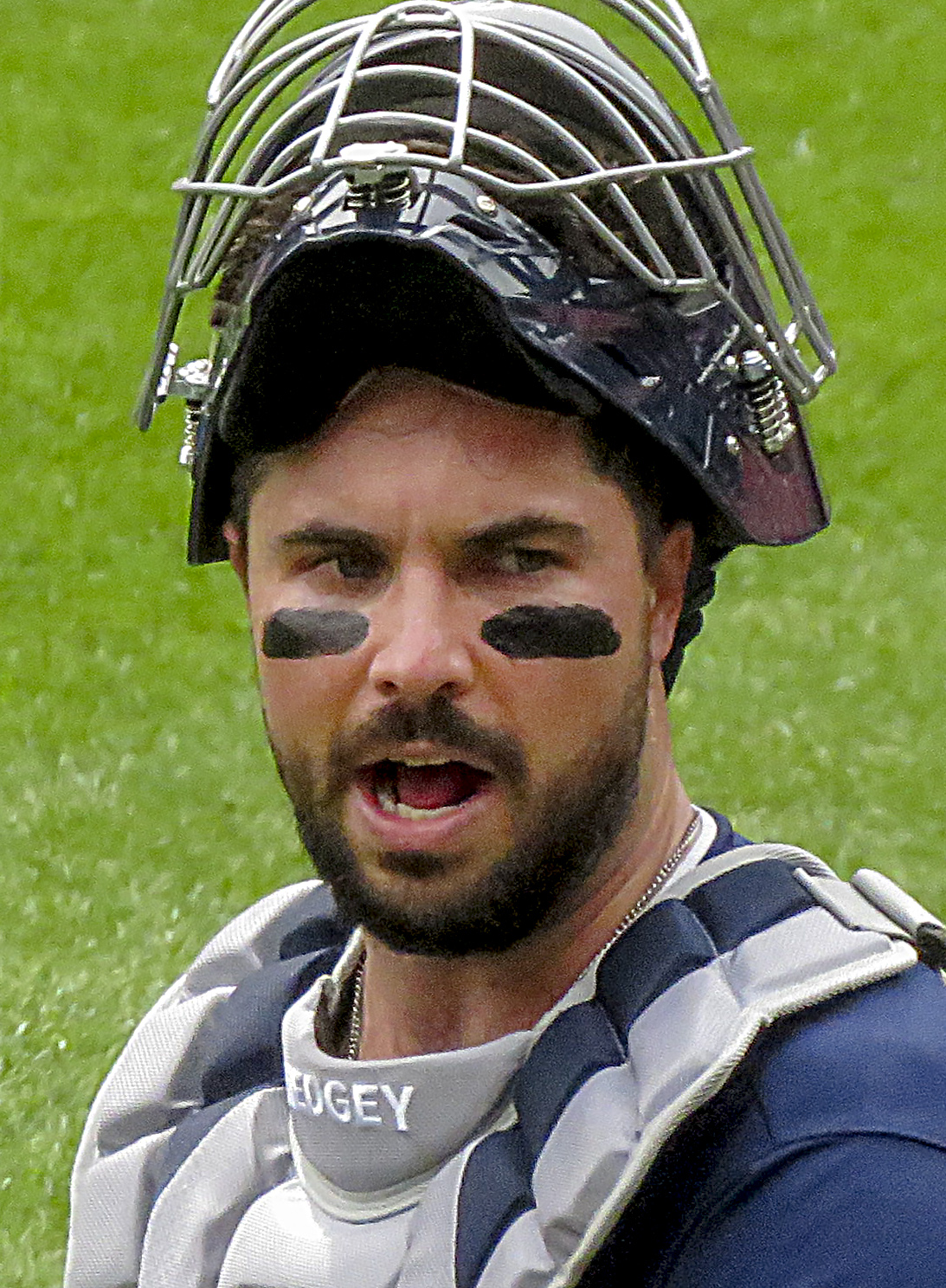
Hedges with the San Diego Padres in 2019

The Padres invited Hedges to spring training in 2016, but began the season in El Paso. In April, he suffered a fractured hamate bone in his left hand which required surgery. He returned to the Triple-A club six weeks after the operation and then went on a run where he hit 14 home runs and posted a .395 batting average over a 30-game stretch. He finished the season with a .326/.353/.597 batting line and 21 home runs in his 82 games with El Paso, which was considered a breakout season for a player regarded as a defense-first catcher. Hedges joined the Padres for 8 games in late September after the Triple-A national championship game.

Hedges moved into a role as the Padres regular catcher in 2017, catching 115 games and backed up by Luis Torrens and Héctor Sánchez. Hedges missed two weeks in late July with a mild concussion after taking a foul ball off his mask. On June 19, Hedges was behind the plate when Anthony Rizzo collided with him on a controversial play and knocked him out of the game. He missed two more games but avoided the disabled list. Hedges finished the season with a .214/.262/.398 batting line with 18 home runs in 387 at-bats. Behind the plate, he had a 37% caught stealing rate. His fielding runs above average (26.7) led all catchers, according to Baseball Prospectus, and he ranked second in framing runs.

In 2018, Hedges again began the season as the Padres regular catcher, backed up by A. J. Ellis. He was placed on the disabled list on May 1 with right elbow tendinitis and had his initial rehab assignment cut short by lingering soreness. He returned to action with the Padres on June 24 and remained as the primary catcher for the rest of the season, splitting time in September with call-up Francisco Mejía. Hedges had a strong July and August and finished the season hitting .231/.282/.429 with 14 home runs in 303 at-bats. Behind the plate he finished fifth best among all catchers in adjusted fielding runs (11.8) according to Baseball Prospectus, despite catching only 95 games on the season.

Hedges entered the 2019 season as the Padres primary catcher, but his bat slumped early and he lost time to Mejía when Mejía returned from an injury in late June. Hedges started 49 of the Padres first 73 games, and then 44 games over the rest of the season. He had a batting line of .176/.252/.311 with 11 home runs in 312 at-bats for the year. Hedges' defense remained strong, as he threw out 33% of base stealers and was worth 28.2 fielding runs above average according to Baseball Prospectus. Hedges was also an elite pitch framer in 2019, ranking at the top of the MLB Statcast leaderboard for the year with 20 runs created with extra strike calls.

=== Cleveland Indians / Guardians ===
On August 31, 2020, the Padres traded Hedges, along with Josh Naylor, Cal Quantrill, and minor league players Gabriel Arias, Owen Miller, and Joey Cantillo, to the Cleveland Indians in exchange for Mike Clevinger, Greg Allen, and Matt Waldron.

Hedges became a free agent following the 2022 season.

=== Pittsburgh Pirates ===
Hedges signed a one-year deal worth $5 million with the Pittsburgh Pirates on December 20, 2022.

=== Texas Rangers ===
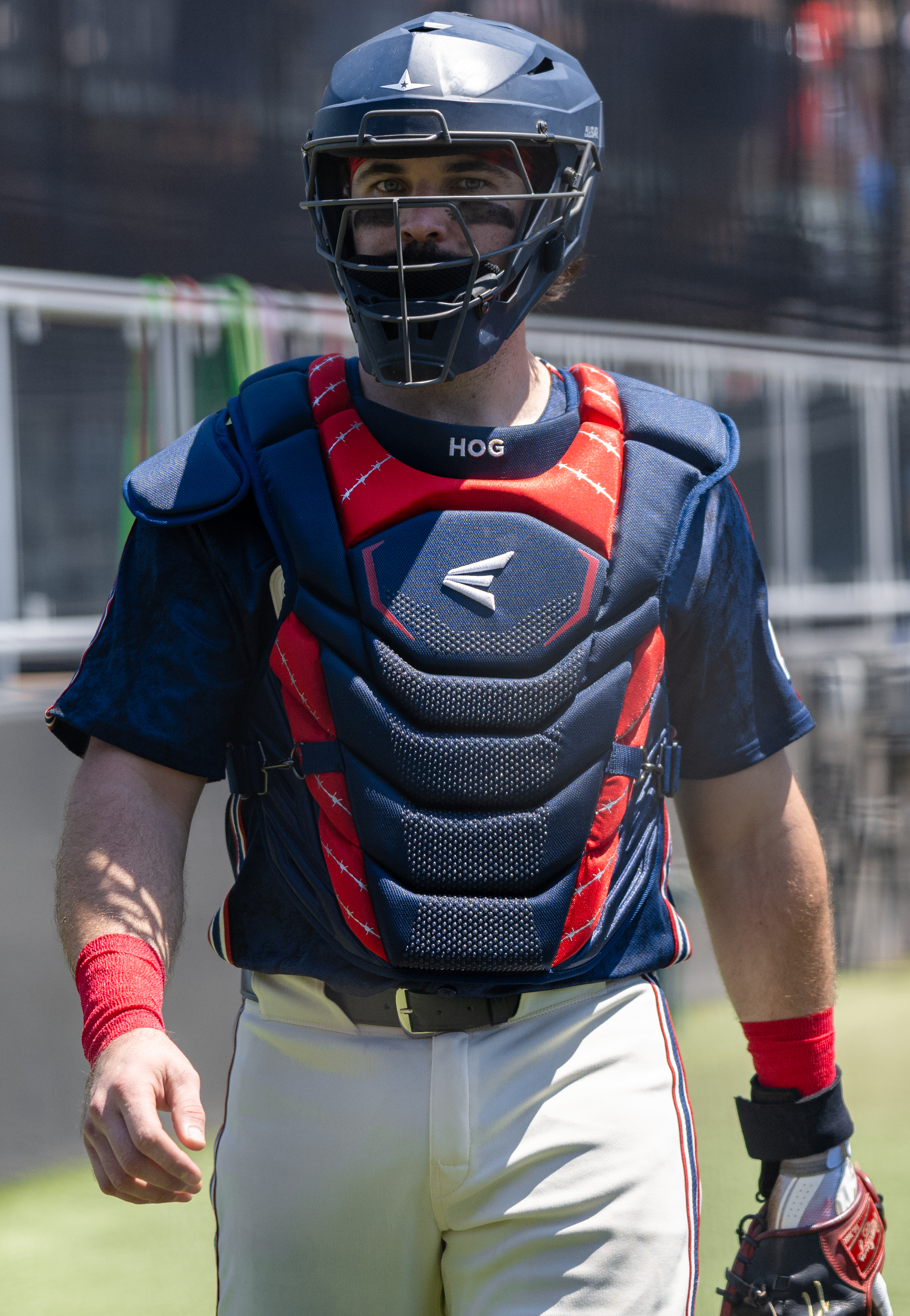
Hedges in 2024

On August 1, 2023, Hedges was traded to the Texas Rangers in exchange for international bonus pool money. Hedges did not appear in the postseason until Game 1 of the 2023 World Series, in which he struck out against Paul Sewald in his only at-bat to send the game into extra innings. The Rangers eventually won the game and went on to win the World Series in five games.

=== Cleveland Guardians (second stint) ===
On December 15, 2023, Hedges signed a one–year contract with the Cleveland Guardians. He made 66 appearances for Cleveland during the 2024 season, batting .152/.203/.220 with two home runs, 15 RBI, and two stolen bases.

On November 6, 2024, Hedges re-signed with the Guardians on a one–year major league contract. He played in 68 contests for the Guardians during the 2025 campaign, slashing .161/.250/.277 with five home runs, 10 RBI, and one stolen base.

On October 15, 2025, Hedges signed another one–year contract with Cleveland.

== Personal life ==
Hedges and his ex-wife, Maggie, were married in 2019 and divorced in 2023. He began dating Lexi in November 2024, and the couple were engaged in April 2026. He resides in San Diego during the offseason.
