= Chase Headley =

American baseball player (born 1984)

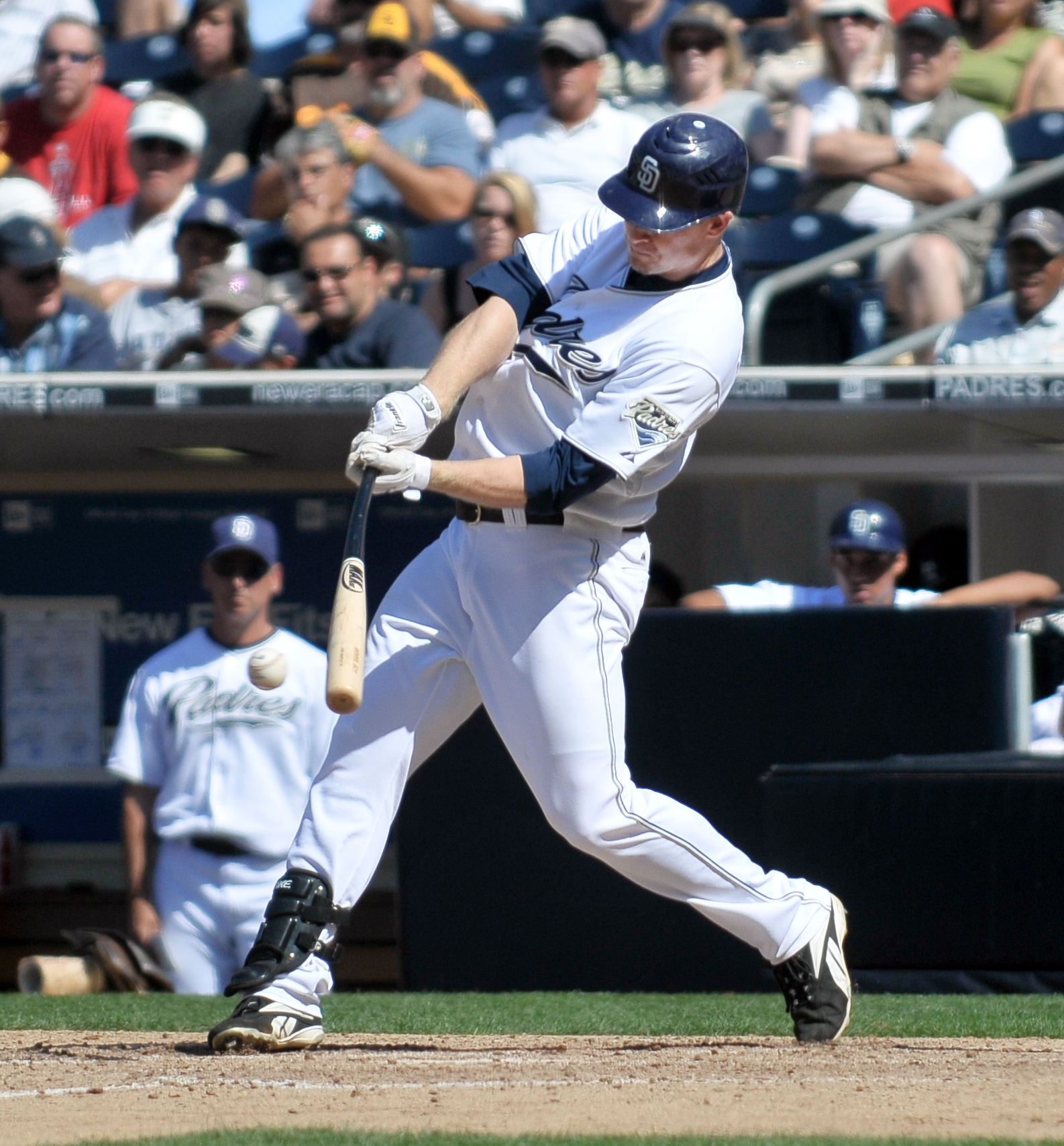
- Headley with the San Diego Padres in 2008
- Third baseman
- Born: May 9, 1984 (age 42); Fountain, Colorado, U.S.
- Batted: Switch Threw: Right

MLB debut
- June 15, 2007, for the San Diego Padres

Last MLB appearance
- May 11, 2018, for the San Diego Padres

MLB statistics
- Batting average: .263
- Home runs: 130
- Runs batted in: 596
- Stats at Baseball Reference

Teams
- San Diego Padres (2007–2014); New York Yankees (2014–2017); San Diego Padres (2018)

Career highlights and awards
- Gold Glove Award (2012); Silver Slugger Award (2012); NL RBI leader (2012)

Chase Jordan Headley (born May 9, 1984) is an American former professional baseball third baseman. A switch-hitter, Headley made his Major League Baseball (MLB) debut with the San Diego Padres in 2007, and also played for the New York Yankees.

Headley played college baseball for the Pacific Tigers and Tennessee Volunteers, before the Padres selected him in the 2005 MLB draft. During the 2012 season, Headley led the National League (NL) in runs batted in (RBIs) and was honored for his hitting with a Silver Slugger Award. He also won a Gold Glove Award for his defense. The Padres traded Headley to the Yankees during the 2014 season, and he was eventually dealt back to San Diego following the 2017 season.

== High school and college ==
Headley graduated as valedictorian from Fountain-Fort Carson High School in Fountain, Colorado, in 2002. He distinguished himself in two sports, receiving four varsity letters in both baseball and basketball. In baseball, he was a three-time Colorado All-State player, and was named to the South Metro All-League team for all four of his seasons. Other high school honors included being named 2002 Player of the Year by the Colorado Springs Gazette, 2002 Male Scholar-Athlete of the Year by Rotary International/KRDO-TV, and 2002 Male Athlete of the Year by the Fellowship of Christian Athletes. He was selected to play in the 2002 Colorado Rockies Senior All-Star Game, in which he hit a home run in his first time at bat. He also played two seasons with the Colorado Rockies Select Scout Team, and in the National Baseball Congress World Series. In basketball, he was named to the All-Conference squad for two seasons.

Headley enrolled at the University of the Pacific and continued to play baseball in college, playing shortstop for the Pacific Tigers. He transitioned to third base, which would become his primary position, when he transferred to the University of Tennessee in 2003 to play for the Tennessee Volunteers. During his sophomore year at Tennessee, he had meniscus surgery on his knee, and a hamstring injury. He recovered for his junior year, however, and worked out 63 walks (breaking Todd Helton's 1995 school record), led the team in batting average at .387, while approaching the college's single-season mark for on-base percentage (OBP), and leading the Vols to an appearance at the 2005 College World Series. He became an Academic All-American with a 3.63 grade point average, majoring in sports management. In 2004, he played collegiate summer baseball for the Cotuit Kettleers of the Cape Cod Baseball League.

== Professional career ==
=== Draft and minor leagues ===
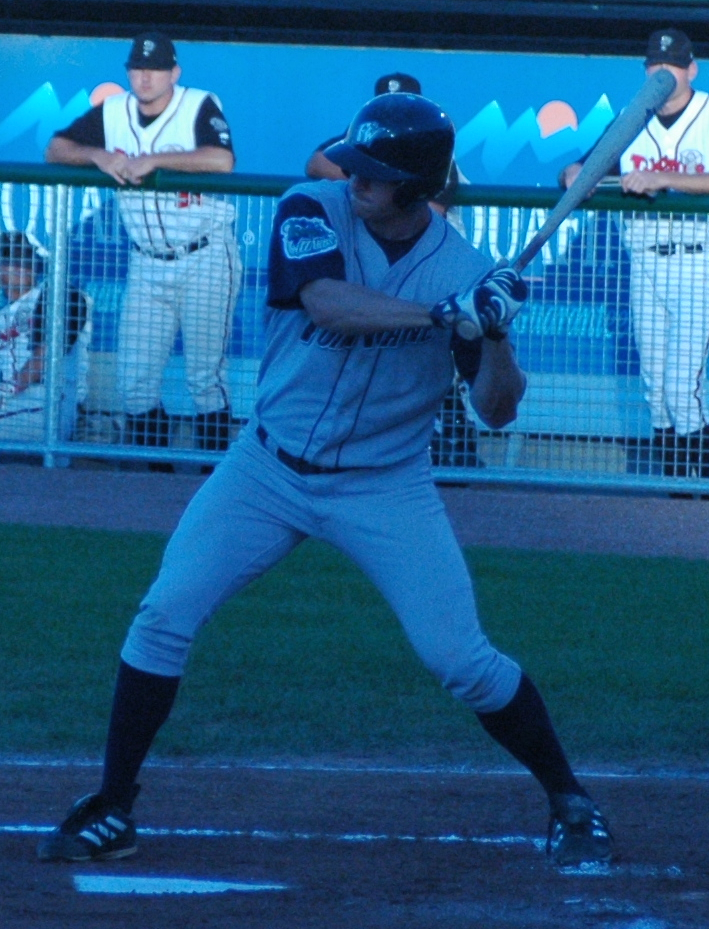
Headley batting for the Fort Wayne Wizards in 2005

The San Diego Padres drafted Headley in the second round of the 2005 Major League Baseball draft.

Headley first played professionally with the Eugene Emeralds of the Class A-Short Season Northwest League, where he was described as a team "mainstay," then for the Lake Elsinore Storm of the Class A-Advanced California League, where he was called "one of the top prospects in the Padres' organization." In 2006, he was one of seven players representing the Padres organization in the Arizona Fall League, playing for the Peoria Saguaros. He was the only one who had not played in a Class AA league before.

The San Diego Union-Tribune called Headley the Padres' best eventual prospect to fill the third base position, though it theorized it would take two years.

Headley says:

I try to do as much as I can to mentally prepare myself every day, mainly because I'm not quite as physically gifted as some of the guys I play against. I'm trying to get every advantage mentally as I can – keeping track of what different pitchers have done to me in the past, or what other hitters do in certain situations against our guys, so I can position myself better – I just try to apply myself and see if I can't pick something up and use it to benefit what I'm trying to do.

Headley was named the 2007 Texas League Player of the Year, after hitting .330/.437/.580 with a 1.016 OPS and leading the league in many fielding stats for third basemen. He did strike out 114 times, though, in just 443 at bats.

Headley hit well in spring training in 2008, .371 with a team-leading 12 RBIs, but was sent to the Portland Beavers of the Class AAA Pacific Coast League to get more experience playing left field. In 65 games in Portland, he hit 13 home runs and 24 doubles, batted .305/.383/.556, and was then called up to the Padres.

=== San Diego Padres (2007–2014) ===
==== 2007–2011 ====
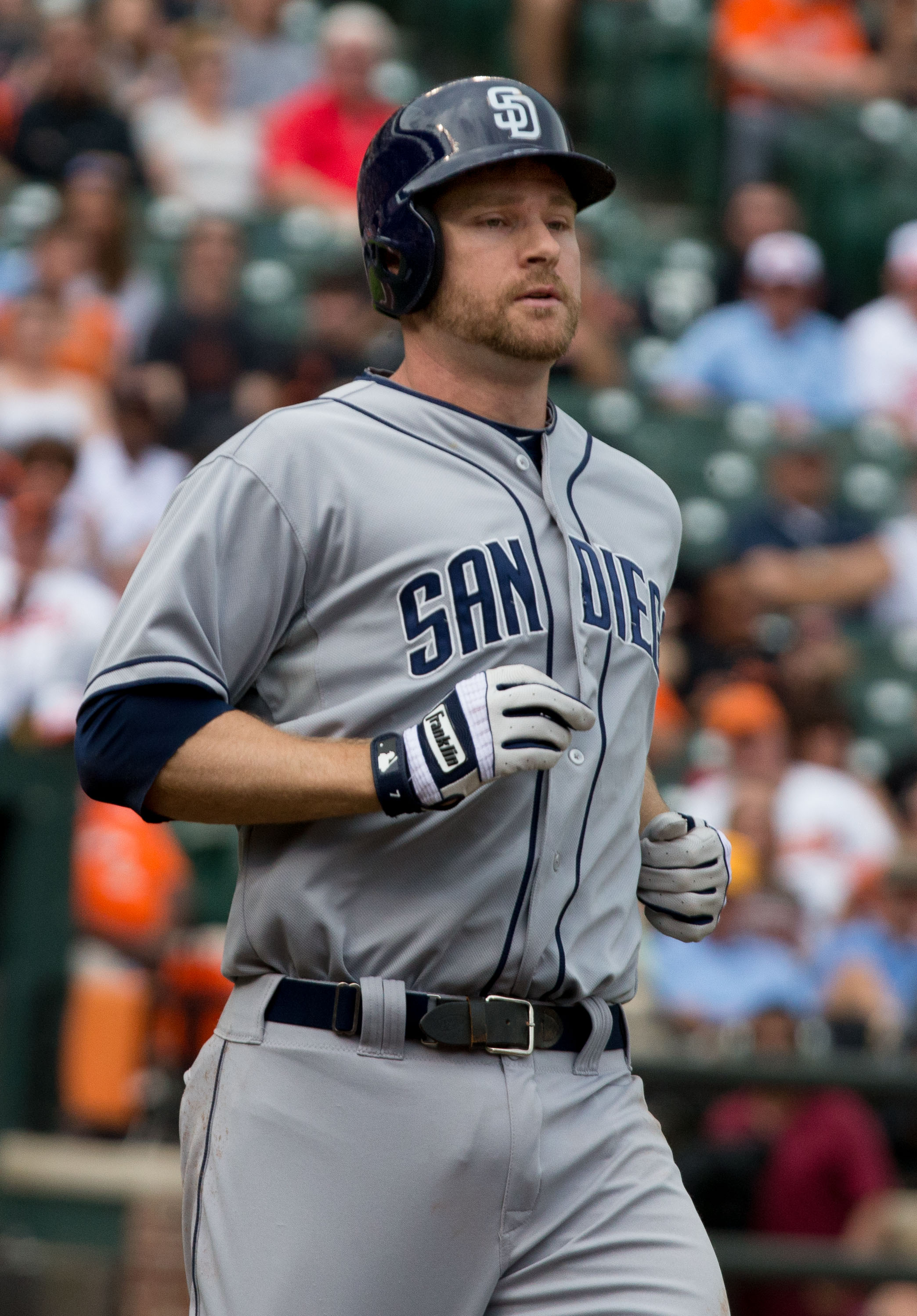
Headley with the San Diego Padres

On June 15, 2007, after hitting .357 for the San Antonio Missions of the Double-A Texas League, Headley was brought up for 8 games because of an injury to Padres third baseman Kevin Kouzmanoff. He made his major league debut against the Chicago Cubs at Wrigley Field. His first major league hit came on June 17; a single to center field in the second inning against the Cubs. Headley finished the season in the majors.

Headley was again called up on June 17, 2008, and went 2–4 with two strikeouts against the Yankees at Yankee Stadium. He picked up his first major league home run the following night, an eighth inning shot off Kyle Farnsworth. Headley batted .269/.337/.420, with nine home runs and 104 strikeouts in 331 at bats that year.

Headley began the 2009 season as the Padres' starting left fielder. On July 10, he was the only player to reach base during Jonathan Sánchez's no-hitter, reaching on an error by Juan Uribe, and ending the perfect game bid after 22 straight retirements. He finished the season with a .262 batting average, 12 home runs, 64 RBIs and a .734 OPS. Headley also had the second-highest Range Factor/Game as LF.

In early January 2010, the Padres traded third baseman Kevin Kouzmanoff to the Oakland Athletics, moving Headley back to third base, his original position. On April 16, Headley hit a walk-off three-run home run off Diamondbacks pitcher Juan Gutierrez, snapping the Padres two-game losing streak. Headley finished the season with a .264 batting average, 11 home runs, 17 stolen bases and a .702 OPS. He led the National League in games played at third base and appeared in the top 10 for defensive WAR (1.5), games played (161), at bats (610), plate appearances (674), singles, assists at third base, and fielding percentage at third base (.966).

Headley had multiple career bests in 2011, batting .289/.374/.399 with a .773 OPS. But an injury limited Headley to only 4 home runs in 381 at bats. He also led the National league in putouts at 3B.

==== 2012 ====
During spring training in 2012, Headley set initial goals of hitting 15 home runs and recording 75 RBIs in the upcoming season after a discussion with former Padre and Hall of Fame outfielder Dave Winfield. While the Padres were extending contracts of some of their players, they did not pursue a deal with Headley due to the potential of third base prospects Jedd Gyorko and Logan Forsythe. Headley was rumored to be traded but was kept at the trade deadline in July. He was named the NL Player of the Week for the week ending August 12. He was later named NL Player of the Month for August, becoming the first Padre to be so honored since Tony Gwynn won the award in May 1997. Headley that month was tied for the major league lead in home runs (10) and led the majors with 31 RBIs. He hit .306 (33-for-108) in August with 20 runs scored and a .611 slugging percentage (SLG). He earned a second consecutive Player of the Month honor in September after hitting .324 that month with nine homers, 30 RBIs, a .410 OBP, and a .645 SLG. He was the second Padre to win Player of the Month in consecutive months, the first being third baseman Ken Caminiti in August and September of 1996. He became the first Padre to ever have more than one 30-RBI month. Over the final 57 games of the season, he batted .313 with 19 homers, 44 runs scored and 63 RBIs.

Headley was unanimously voted the Padre Player of the Year by the San Diego chapter of the Baseball Writers' Association of America (BBWAA) after hitting .286 and leading the league in RBIs with 115. He joined Winfield (118 in 1979) as the only Padres to lead the league in RBIs. Headley set career highs in hits (173), runs (95), home runs (31), walks (86), RBIs, total bases (301), OBP (.376) and SLG (.498) and matched career highs in games played (161), doubles (31), and steals (17). He reached base in 146 games, breaking the Padres record held by Gwynn (144 in 1987)

Headley won a Gold Glove Award after leading all major league third basemen in games played (159) and assists (315) and the National League in total chances (425). He also won a Silver Slugger Award after leading all NL third basemen in home runs, runs scored, and walks. He was the eighth third baseman in NL history to win a Gold Glove and a Silver Slugger in the same season. Headley finished in fifth place with 127 votes in the voting for the NL Most Valuable Player (MVP) award, and won the This Year in Baseball award for "MLB Breakout Hitter of the Year".

After making $3.475 million in 2012, Headley was under team control for the following two seasons with San Diego but eligible for salary arbitration.

==== 2013–2014 ====
On January 30, 2013, Headley signed a one-year contract worth $8.575 million with San Diego. On March 17 during spring training, he fractured the tip of his left thumb when it got caught under the second base bag while he was sliding feet-first to break up a double play. He started the 2013 season on the disabled list, and returned exactly a month after the injury on April 17. He also played through a torn meniscus in his left knee during the season, which began giving him problems during spring training. His offensive production slipped from the previous season. At season's end, Headley admitted his knee troubles "probably" contributed to his decline. He was scheduled to undergo arthroscopic surgery on his knee during the offseason.

In 77 games with the Padres in 2014, Headley batted .229 with a .296 OBP.

=== New York Yankees (2014–2017) ===
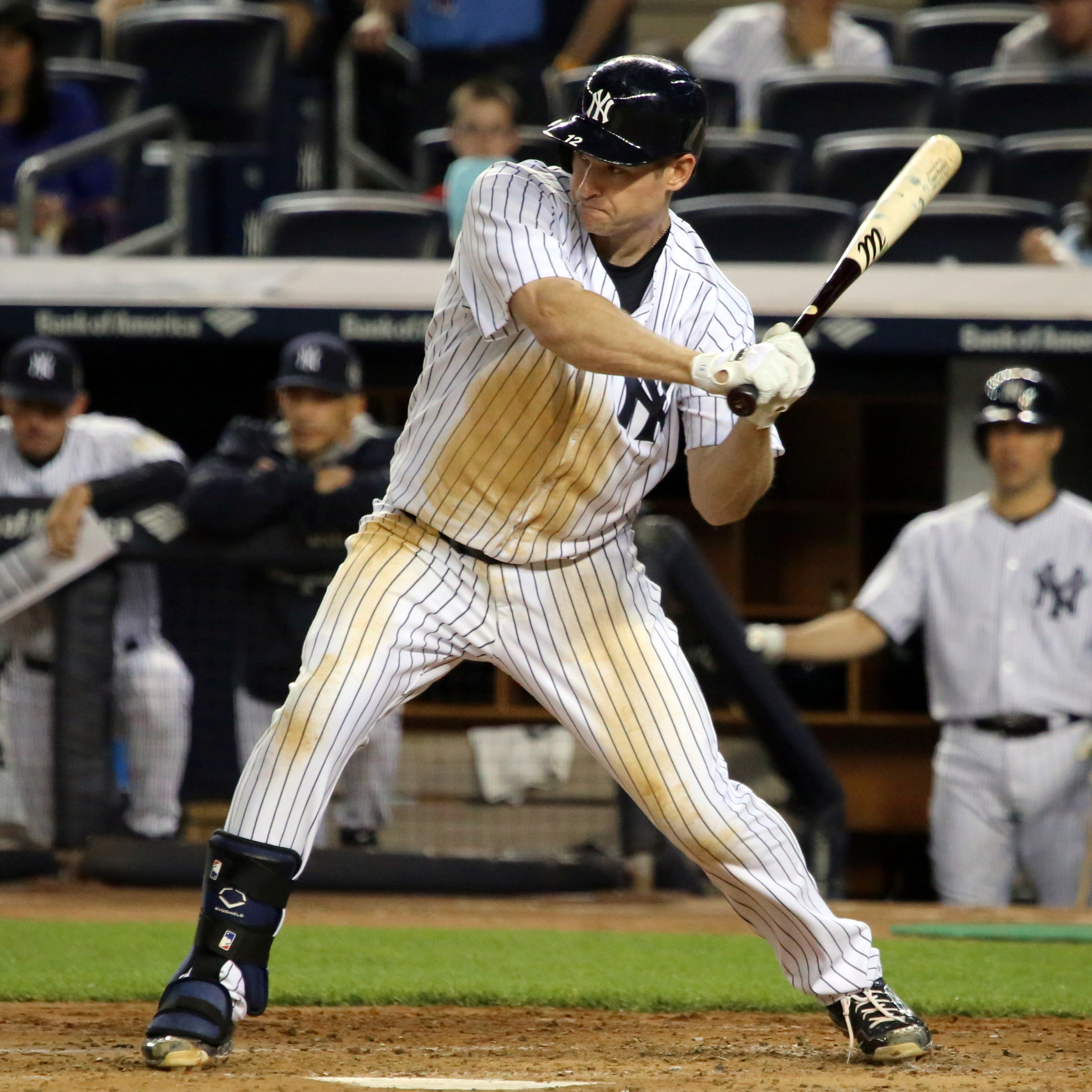
Headley batting for the New York Yankees in 2015

On July 22, 2014, the Padres traded Headley to the New York Yankees in exchange for Yangervis Solarte and Rafael De Paula. Later that same day, Headley drove in the winning run for the Yankees with a walk-off single in the bottom of the 14th inning to seal a 2–1 victory over the Texas Rangers. On September 4, 2014, Headley hit a walk-off solo home run off Red Sox closer Koji Uehara to give the Yankees a come from behind 5–4 victory. On September 11, 2014, Headley was hit in the face with a 97 m.p.h. fastball. He was able to walk off the field under his own power, although he required stitches on his chin. In 58 games with the Yankees, he had a .371 OBP, which was the fifth highest among third basemen over that span.

On December 15, Headley returned to the Yankees, agreeing to a reported four-year, $52 million contract. On July 3, 2015, Headley got his 1,000th career hit. In 2015, Headley batted .259 with 11 home runs and 62 RBIs. 2015 was a poor season defensively for Headley, as he committed a career-high 23 errors.

Headley began the 2016 hitting .150 in April. He did not get his first extra-base hit until May 12, a two-run home run against the Kansas City Royals. Headley finished 2016 batting .253 with 14 home runs and 53 RBIs. 2016 was a much better season defensively for Headley, as he committed only 10 errors.

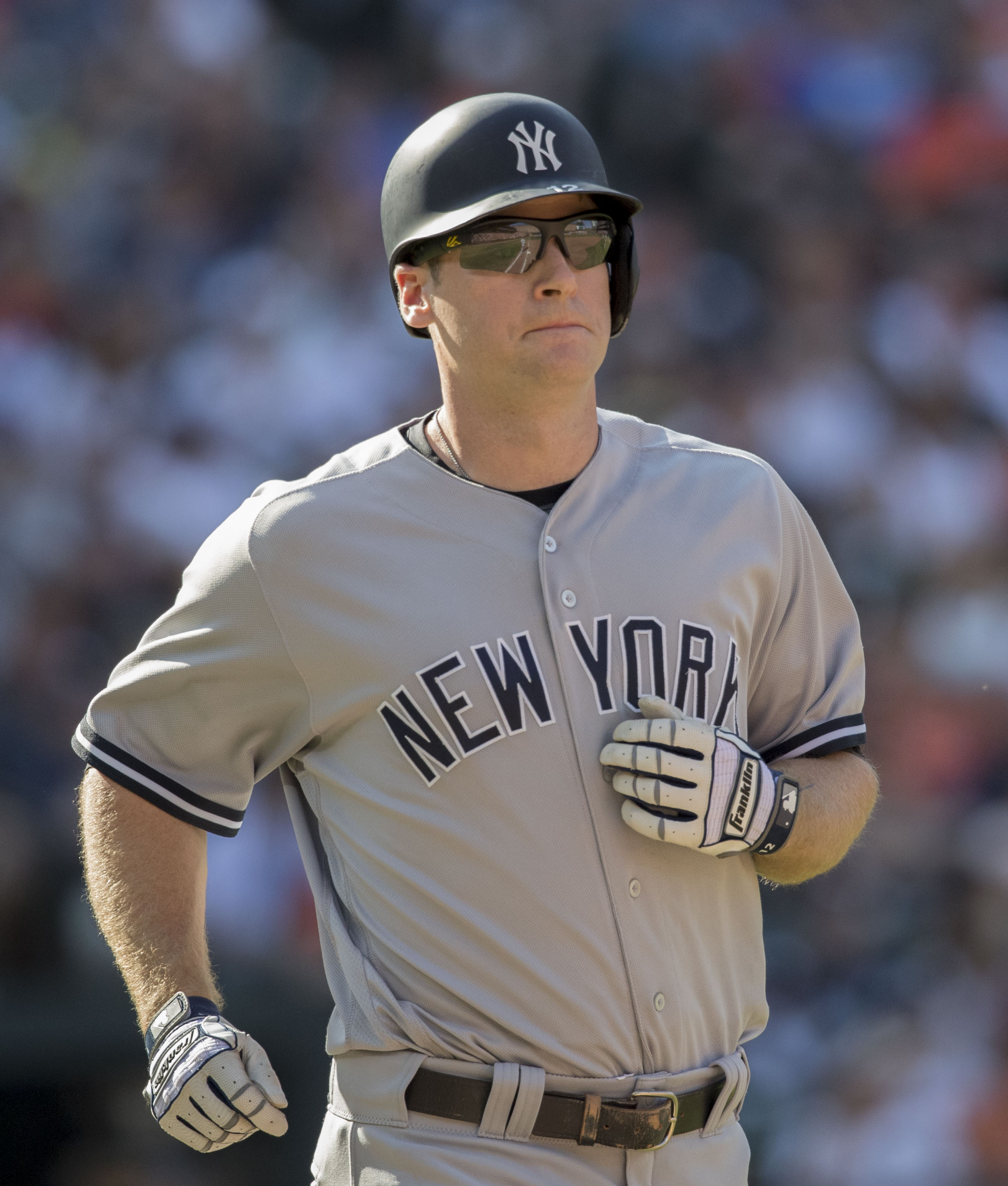
Headley with the New York Yankees in 2017

Headley began the 2017 season batting .301 with 10 extra-base hits in April. However, he then batted .165 in the month of May. On May 12, Headley was ejected by Adrian Johnson for having a heated exchange. Headley fouled a ball off after trying to pull back a bunt attempt, in which the ball seemingly hit his hand. After a brief standout from the batter's box, umpire Adrian Johnson unexpectedly accused Headley for being out of the box for too long, leading to the argument.

With the Yankees' acquisition of third baseman Todd Frazier from the Chicago White Sox, it was announced that Headley would move to first base.

=== Second stint with the Padres (2018) ===
On December 12, 2017, the Yankees traded Headley and Bryan Mitchell to the San Diego Padres for Jabari Blash. He began the 2018 season batting 1-for-28 (.036) and began to lose playing time to Christian Villanueva and Cory Spangenberg. On May 12, the Padres designated Headley for assignment. In 58 plate appearances, Headley had a .115 batting average and a .233 on-base percentage. He was released on May 18.

== Personal life ==
He and his wife Casey married on November 15, 2008. The couple has three sons together.
