= Walker Lockett =

American baseball player (born 1994)

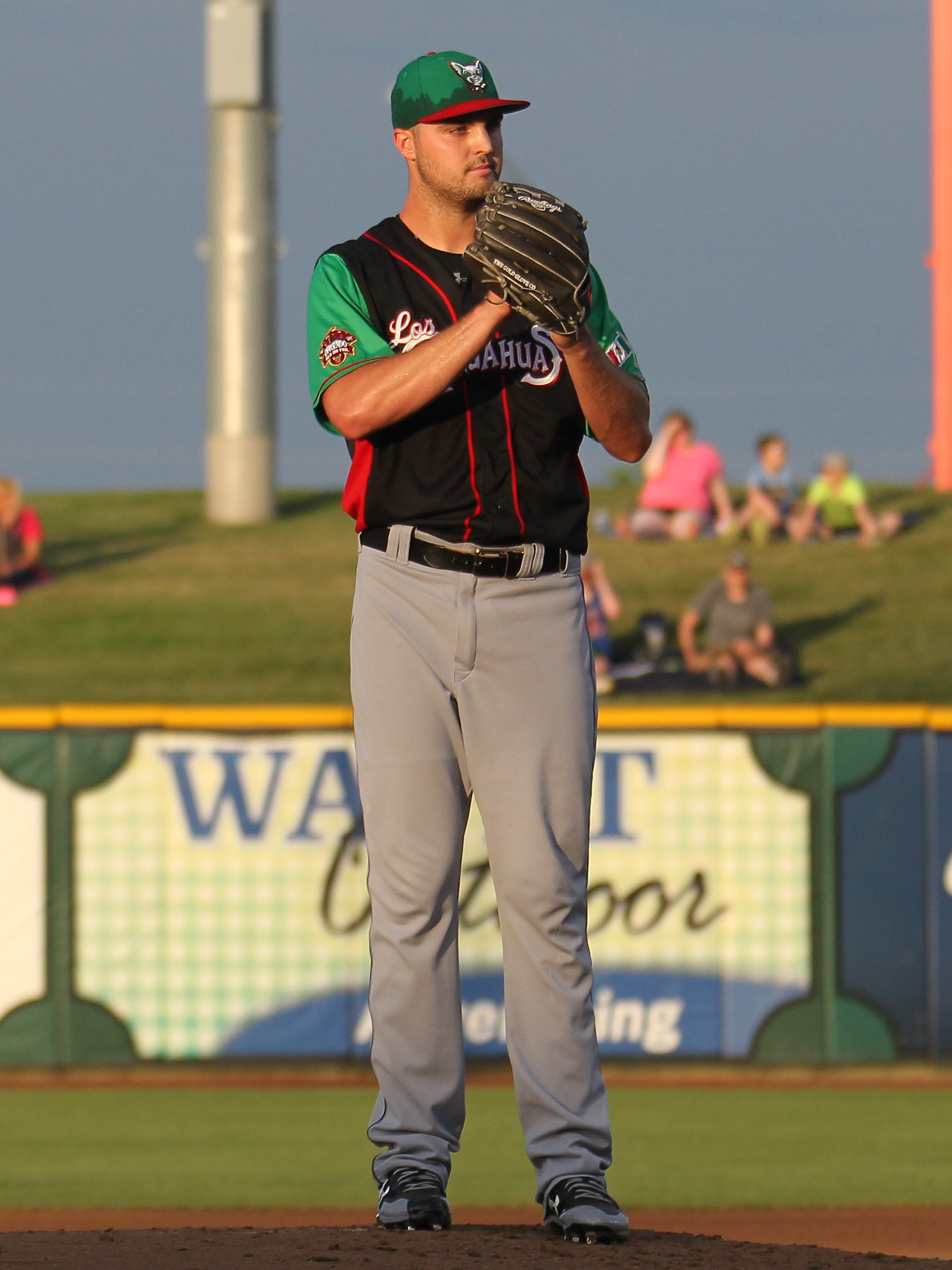
- Lockett with the El Paso Chihuahuas in 2018

Free agent
- Pitcher
- Born: May 3, 1994 (age 32); Jacksonville, Florida, U.S.
- Bats: Right Throws: Right

Professional debut
- MLB: June 1, 2018, for the San Diego Padres
- KBO: April 4, 2021, for the Doosan Bears

MLB statistics (through 2020 season)
- Win–loss record: 2–4
- Earned run average: 7.67
- Strikeouts: 39

KBO statistics (through 2021 season)
- Win–loss record: 9-9
- Earned run average: 2.98
- Strikeouts: 112
- Stats at Baseball Reference

Teams
- San Diego Padres (2018); New York Mets (2019–2020); Seattle Mariners (2020); Doosan Bears (2021)

Andrew Walker Lockett (born May 3, 1994) is an American professional baseball pitcher who is a free agent. He has previously played in Major League Baseball (MLB) for the San Diego Padres, New York Mets, and Seattle Mariners, and in the KBO League for the Doosan Bears.

== Early life ==
Lockett attended Providence School in Jacksonville, Florida. As a junior first baseman, he averaged a home run in every 5.2 at bats and posted a .468 batting average and .598 on-base percentage with 57 runs batted in. As a result, he was named the All-First Coast Baseball Player of the Year by The Florida Times-Union. As a senior in 2012, he led Providence to a state high school baseball championship. He had committed to play college baseball at South Florida as a junior.

== Career ==
=== San Diego Padres ===
The San Diego Padres selected him in the fourth round of the 2012 Major League Baseball draft, and the parties agreed on a $340,000 signing bonus. He spent 2012 with the Arizona League Padres, pitching to a 4.34 earned run average in 18 2/3 innings. He pitched only 2 1/3 innings in 2013 and 10 1/3 innings in 2014 due to injuries. Lockett returned in 2015 and pitched for the Fort Wayne TinCaps, Tri-City Dust Devils, and AZL Padres, posting a combined 4-4 record and 4.14 ERA in 18 total games (17 starts) between the three clubs. In 2016, he played for Fort Wayne, the Lake Elsinore Storm, San Antonio Missions and El Paso Chihuahuas, compiling a combined 10-9 record, 2.96 ERA and 1.06 WHIP in 28 total games (25 starts).

The Padres added Lockett to their 40-man roster after the 2016 season. He spent 2017 with El Paso, collecting a 5-2 record and 4.39 ERA in ten starts. He missed nearly three months of the season due to a lower back strain.

On June 1, 2018, Lockett was recalled by the Padres to start that evening in place of an injured Joey Lucchesi against the Cincinnati Reds. Through the first three innings, Lockett held the Reds to just one run on one hit and three walks. A lead off walk to Eugenio Suarez in the fourth, followed by a single by Scott Schebler and a double by Jose Peraza increased the Reds' lead to 3-0. Lockett came back to retire the next two batters before issuing his fifth walk of the day to Jesse Winker. Tucker Barnhart followed with a single to score Peraza, and knock Lockett out of the game. All told, Lockett allowed four hits, four runs and walked five in 3 2/3 innings, taking the loss as the Reds defeated the Padres 7-2. For the season, Lockett went 0-3 with a 9.60 ERA in four appearances (3 starts).

=== New York Mets ===
The Padres traded Lockett to the Cleveland Indians on November 20, 2018 for minor league pitcher Ignacio Feliz. On January 6, 2019, Cleveland traded Lockett and Sam Haggerty to the New York Mets for catcher Kevin Plawecki. After beginning the season with the triple A Syracuse Mets, Lockett was called up in late June when Noah Syndergaard was placed on the 10 day injured list with a right hamstring strain. After cruising through his first two innings of work, Lockett was roughed up by the Chicago Cubs in the third. The Cubs scored six runs, all earned, to pin a loss on Lockett in his Mets debut.

He earned his first career win a month later against Jeff Samardzija and the San Francisco Giants. Lockett pitched five innings, allowing one earned run with three strikeouts. Coincidentally, the one run was driven in by Joe Panik, who would become his teammate with the Mets later in the season.

Lockett was designated for assignment by the Mets on August 28, 2020.

=== Seattle Mariners ===
On September 1, 2020, Lockett was claimed off waivers by the Seattle Mariners.

=== Doosan Bears ===
On December 7, 2020, Lockett was claimed off waivers by the Toronto Blue Jays.

On December 22, 2020, Lockett reached an agreement on a one-year contract with the Doosan Bears of the KBO League. Lockett went 9-9 with a 2.98 ERA in 21 starts for Doosan before undergoing season-ending elbow surgery in October 2021. The Bears parted ways with Lockett following the year on November 30, 2021.

=== Cincinnati Reds ===
On May 11, 2022, Lockett signed a minor league deal with the Cincinnati Reds. He did not make an appearance for the organization and elected free agency following the season on November 10.

=== Olmecas de Tabasco ===
On July 4, 2024, Lockett signed with the Olmecas de Tabasco of the Mexican League. He made 3 starts for Tabasco, posting an 0–1 record and 5.14 ERA with 20 strikeouts over 14 innings pitched. Lockett was released by the Olmecas on April 16, 2025.
