= Jabari Blash =

American baseball player (born 1989)

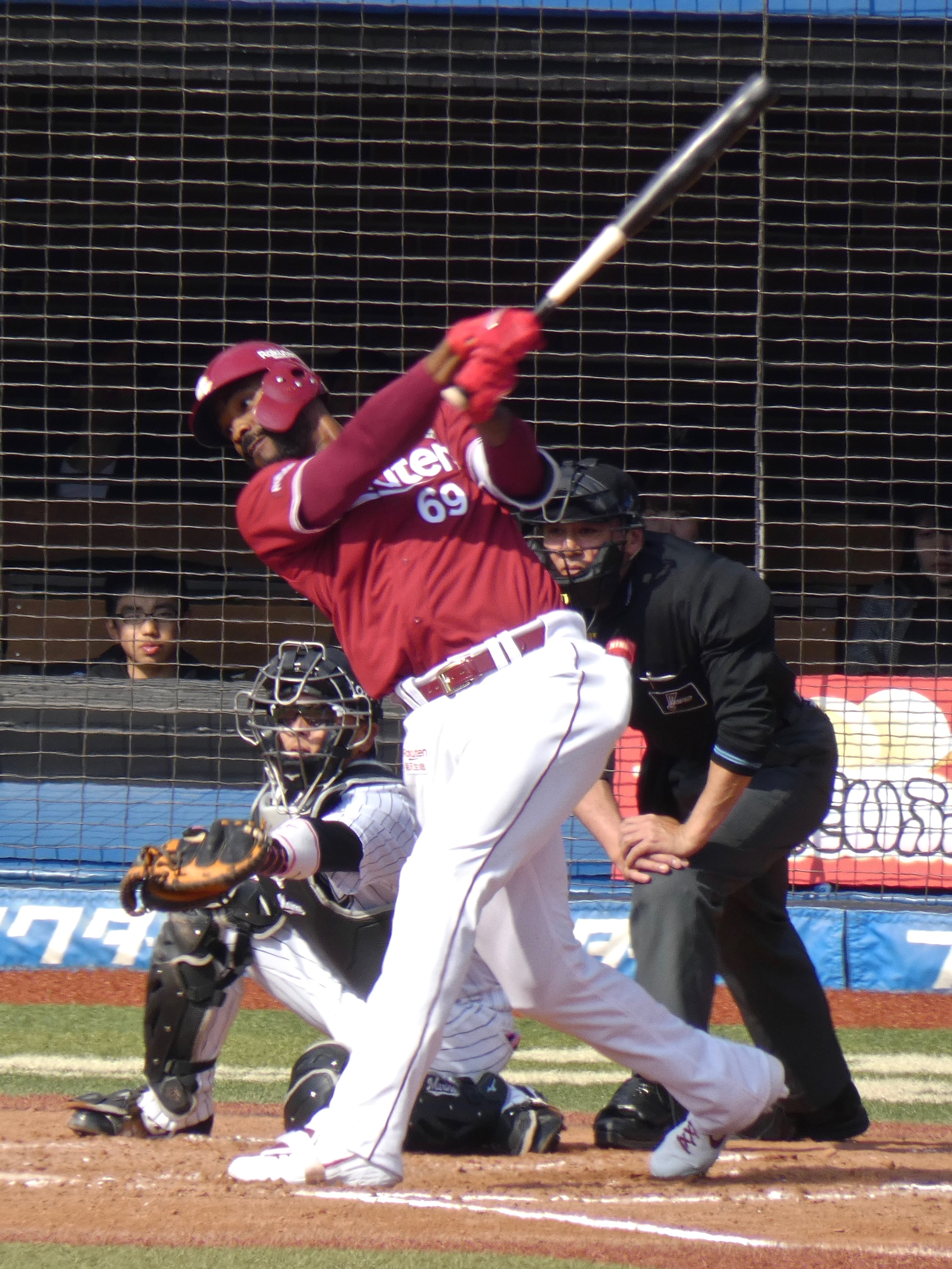
- Blash with the Eagles in 2019
- Outfielder
- Born: July 4, 1989 (age 37); Saint Thomas, U.S. Virgin Islands
- Batted: Right Threw: Right

Professional debut
- MLB: April 4, 2016, for the San Diego Padres
- NPB: March 29, 2019, for the Tohoku Rakuten Golden Eagles

Last appearance
- MLB: September 30, 2018, for the Los Angeles Angels
- NPB: August 7, 2020, for the Tohoku Rakuten Golden Eagles

MLB statistics
- Batting average: .186
- Home runs: 8
- Runs batted in: 22

NPB statistics
- Batting average: .255
- Home runs: 35
- Runs batted in: 113
- Stats at Baseball Reference

Teams
- San Diego Padres (2016–2017); Los Angeles Angels (2018); Tohoku Rakuten Golden Eagles (2019–2020)

Jabari Jerell Blash (born July 4, 1989) is an American former professional baseball outfielder. He made his Major League Baseball (MLB) debut in 2016 with the San Diego Padres. He also played in MLB for the Los Angeles Angels and in Nippon Professional Baseball (NPB) for the Tohoku Rakuten Golden Eagles.

== Career ==
Blash was drafted by the Chicago White Sox in the 29th round of the 2007 Major League Baseball draft out of Charlotte Amalie High School in St. Thomas, Virgin Islands. He did not sign and attended Alcorn State University, but was unable to play baseball due to issues with his academic transcript. He transferred to Miami-Dade College, and had a .353 batting average and 10 home runs in 102 at-bats for the school's baseball team. He was then drafted by the Texas Rangers in the ninth round of the 2009 Major League Baseball draft. He again did not sign and returned to Miami-Dade.

=== Seattle Mariners ===
The Seattle Mariners chose Blash in the eighth round of the 2010 Major League Baseball draft and he signed. Blash made his professional debut for the Pulaski Mariners. In 2013, he hit 25 home runs with a .915 on-base plus slugging (OPS) while playing for the High Desert Mavericks and Jackson Generals. He started 2014 back with Jackson and was promoted to the Tacoma Rainiers in April.

=== San Diego Padres ===
The Oakland Athletics selected Blash in the 2015 Rule 5 draft and then traded him to the San Diego Padres as the player to be named later from the December 2 trade in which the Athletics acquired Yonder Alonso.

Blash made the Padres' Opening Day roster. He batted 3-for-25 (.120) with 13 strikeouts, and was designated for assignment on May 13. He cleared waivers and the Mariners declined his return, allowing him to be outrighted into San Diego's minor league system. After playing for the El Paso Chihuahuas, the Padres promoted him back to the major leagues on July 30. On May 9, 2017, Blash was optioned down to Triple-A to make room for Matt Szczur on the roster.

=== Los Angeles Angels ===
On December 12, 2017, the Padres traded Blash to the New York Yankees for Chase Headley and Bryan Mitchell. The Yankees designated Blash for assignment on February 20, 2018, in order to make room for Brandon Drury, who was acquired earlier in the day in a three-team trade. The next day, the Yankees traded Blash to the Los Angeles Angels for a player to be named later or cash considerations. In 24 games with the Angels, Blash hit only .103 with 1 RBI. On November 29, 2018, Blash was released by the Angels.

=== Tohoku Rakuten Golden Eagles ===
On December 7, 2018, Blash signed a contract with the Tohoku Rakuten Golden Eagles of Nippon Professional Baseball (NPB) for the 2019 season worth ¥120 million.

On December 3, 2019, Blash signed a 1-year extension to remain with the Eagles.

On December 2, 2020, he became a free agent. He retired on January 13, 2021.

== Personal life ==
Blash's younger brother, Jamori, a 23rd-round draft pick in 2017, is a first baseman in the Washington Nationals organization.
