= Bryan Mitchell =

American baseball player (born 1991)

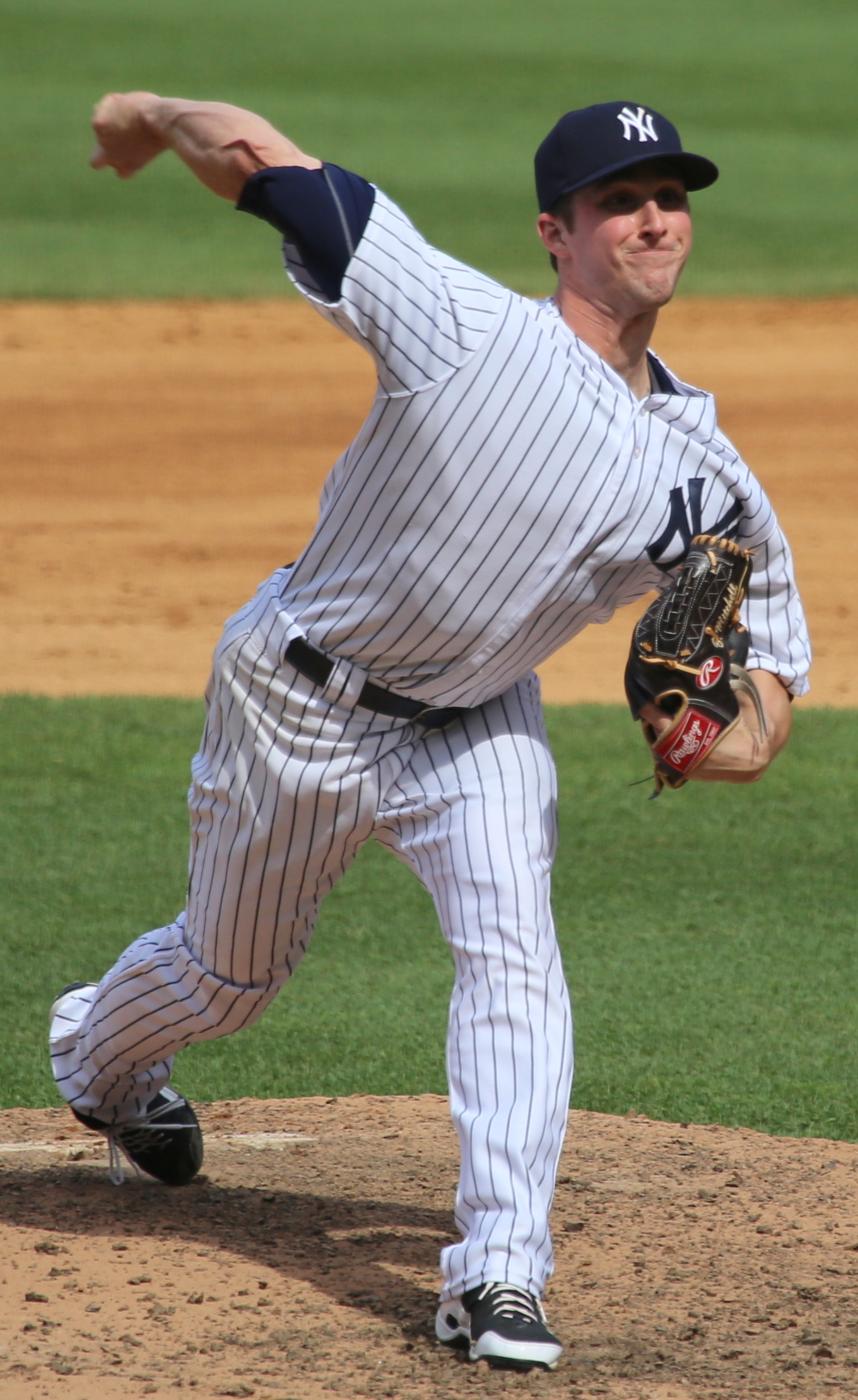
- Mitchell with the New York Yankees
- Pitcher
- Born: April 19, 1991 (age 35); Reidsville, North Carolina, U.S.
- Batted: Left Threw: Right

MLB debut
- August 10, 2014, for the New York Yankees

Last MLB appearance
- August 24, 2021, for the Miami Marlins

MLB statistics
- Win–loss record: 4–10
- Earned run average: 5.13
- Strikeouts: 106
- Stats at Baseball Reference

Teams
- New York Yankees (2014–2017); San Diego Padres (2018); Miami Marlins (2021)

Bryan Bedford Mitchell (born April 19, 1991) is an American former professional baseball pitcher. He played in Major League Baseball (MLB) for the New York Yankees, San Diego Padres, and Miami Marlins.

== Amateur career ==
Mitchell attended Rockingham County High School in Reidsville, North Carolina. Playing for the school's baseball team, the North Carolina Baseball Coaches Association named Mitchell to their All-State team in 2009. He committed to attend the University of North Carolina at Chapel Hill (UNC) to play college baseball for the North Carolina Tar Heels.

== Professional career ==
=== New York Yankees ===
Mitchell was selected by the New York Yankees in the 16th round, 495th overall, of the 2009 Major League Baseball draft. Mitchell dropped in the draft after teams passed on him due to his commitment to UNC. Mitchell chose to sign with the Yankees, rather than enroll at UNC. He received an $800,000 signing bonus. Mitchell made his professional debut in 2010 with the GCL Yankees, and also played for the Low-A Staten Island Yankees, recording a 3.94 ERA in 11 games between the two teams. The following season, Mitchell returned to Staten Island and pitched to a 1–3 record and 4.09 ERA in 14 appearances.

In 2012, Mitchell played for the Single-A Charleston RiverDogs of the South Atlantic League, and was named an All-Star. On the year, he registered a 9–11 record and 4.58 ERA with 121 strikeouts in 120.0 innings of work. In 2013, Mitchell pitched for the High-A Tampa Yankees of the Florida State League and the Double-A Trenton Thunder of the Eastern League, accumulating a 4–11 record and 4.71 ERA in 27 appearances.

The Yankees added Mitchell to their 40-man roster on November 20, 2013. Mitchell was assigned to Trenton to begin the 2014 season, and was promoted to the major leagues for the first time on April 20, 2014. He injured his arm while warming up and was optioned back to the minors without appearing in a game. He received a midseason promotion to the Triple-A Scranton/Wilkes-Barre RailRiders of the International League. On July 13, Mitchell was recalled to the majors. He again was optioned to the minors without appearing in a game on August 11.

Mitchell made his MLB debut on August 10, 2014, pitching 2.0 innings of shutout ball against the Cleveland Indians. He made his first major league start on September 12, pitching 5 innings and allowing 2 runs while taking the loss versus the Baltimore Orioles. He finished his rookie year with a 2.45 ERA in three big league appearances.

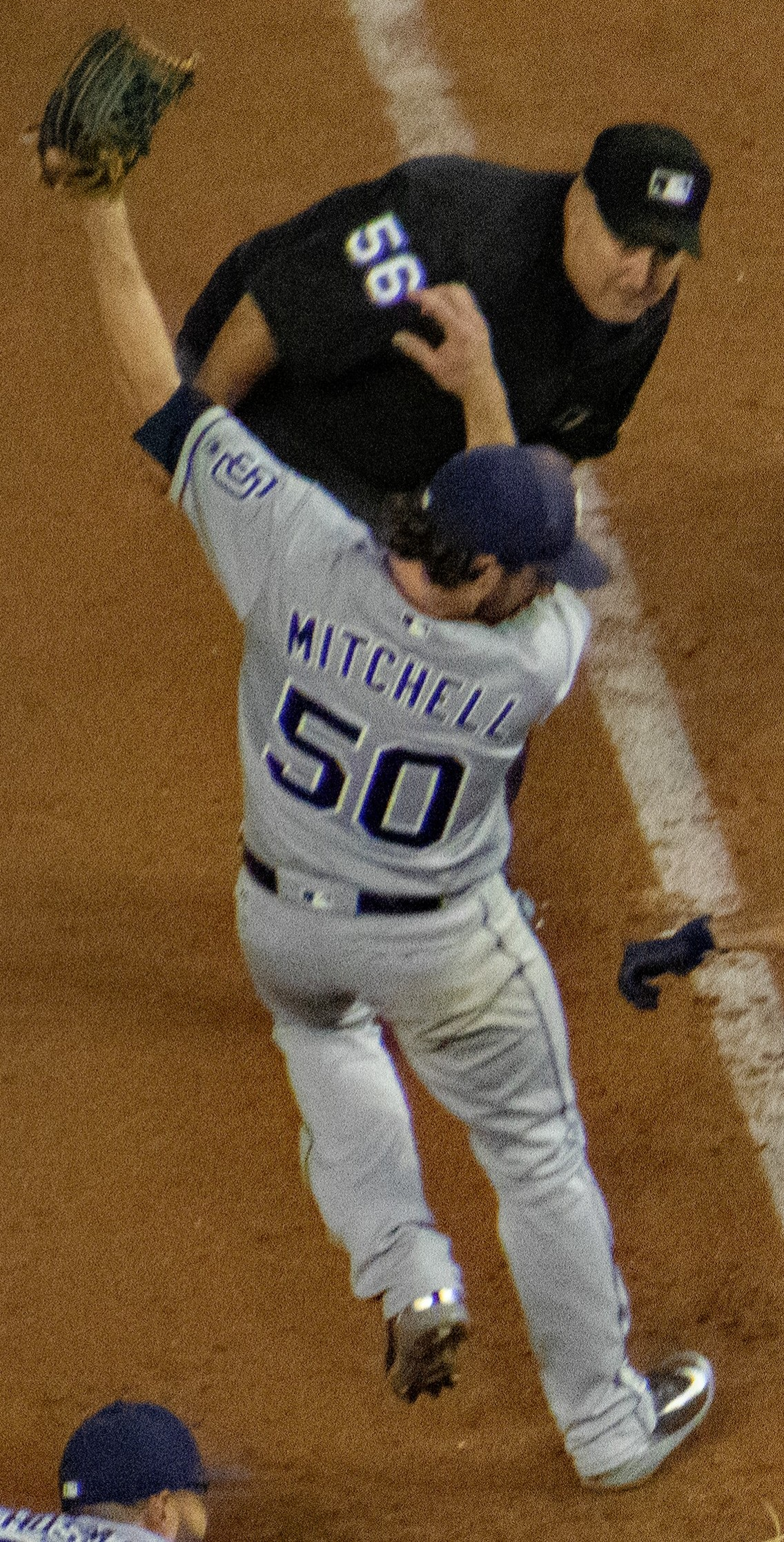
Mitchell with the San Diego Padres

Mitchell began the 2015 season with Scranton, and was recalled to the major leagues on June 19. On August 17, Mitchell was hit in the face by a line drive hit by Minnesota Twins infielder Eduardo Núñez. He was taken out of the game, and diagnosed with a nasal fracture. Mitchell finished the 2015 season with a 6.37 ERA and 29 strikeouts in 20 appearances for the Yankees.

On March 30, 2016, Mitchell injured his foot, which required surgery and caused him to miss most of the year. In five appearances for New York, he logged a 3.24 ERA with 11 strikeouts in 25.0 innings.

On April 30, 2017, Mitchell played at first base, becoming only one of very few pitchers to play at that position. After pitching a scoreless ninth, he was asked to play first base in the tenth in order to be available to pitch in the eleventh. While at first base, Mitchell committed a fielding error while trying to put away a pop up in foul territory. He later made a successful putout on a later batter who popped up. In the eleventh, Mitchell went back to the mound, but ended up surrendering three runs as the Yankees lost to the Baltimore Orioles 4–7. The next day, on May 1, Mitchell was optioned to Triple-A Scranton/Wilkes Barre so the Yankees could call up Luis Cessa. He had pitched 11.1 innings, posting a 6.35 ERA. He was recalled on May 21. After being optioned back Triple-A Scranton/Wilkes Barre, he was again recalled on August 8. In 20 appearances for the Yankees in 2017, Mitchell registered a 5.79 ERA with 17 strikeouts in 13.2 innings of work.

=== San Diego Padres ===
On December 12, 2017, the Yankees traded Mitchell and Chase Headley to the San Diego Padres in exchange for Jabari Blash. He opened the season in the Padres rotation, but after 7 starts he was sent to the bullpen. He was placed on the disabled list on June 20 with a right elbow impingement. Mitchell ended the year with a 2–4 record and 5.42 ERA in 16 games (11 starts). He struck out 38 batters but also induced 43 walks in 73 innings. Mitchell was designated for assignment on March 28, 2019, following the promotion of Fernando Tatis Jr. and was sent outright to the Triple-A El Paso Chihuahuas on April 1. Mitchell spent the year with El Paso, also pitching in 4 rehab games with the AZL Padres, and struggled to an 0–3 record and 8.68 ERA in 17 games between the two levels. On October 1, Mitchell elected free agency.

=== Chicago White Sox ===
On January 16, 2020, Mitchell signed a minor league contract with the Chicago White Sox organization. Mitchell did not play in a game in 2020 due to the cancellation of the minor league season because of the COVID-19 pandemic. On August 24, Mitchell was released by the White Sox.

=== Philadelphia Phillies ===
On January 26, 2021, Mitchell signed a minor league contract with the Philadelphia Phillies organization. Mitchell recorded a 3–1 record and 6.04 ERA in 20 appearances for the Triple-A Lehigh Valley IronPigs before he was released on July 22.

=== Miami Marlins ===
On July 29, 2021, the Miami Marlins signed Mitchell to a minor league contract. He was assigned to the Triple-A Jacksonville Jumbo Shrimp. On August 19, Mitchell's contract was selected by the Marlins. Mitchell appeared in two games for the Marlins, posting a 4.50 ERA with four strikeouts. On August 25, Mitchell was designated for assignment by the Marlins. On August 27, Mitchell cleared waivers and was assigned outright to Triple-A Jacksonville. On October 13, Mitchell elected free agency.

On March 15, 2022, Mitchell re-signed with the Marlins organization on a minor league contract. He split the year between the Single-A Jupiter Hammerheads, Double-A Pensacola Blue Wahoos, and Jacksonville. In 14 games (7 starts) for the three affiliates, Mitchell compiled a 2-1 record and 7.20 ERA with 34 strikeouts across 40 innings of work. He elected free agency following the season on November 10.
