= Christian Villanueva =

Mexican baseball player (born 1991)

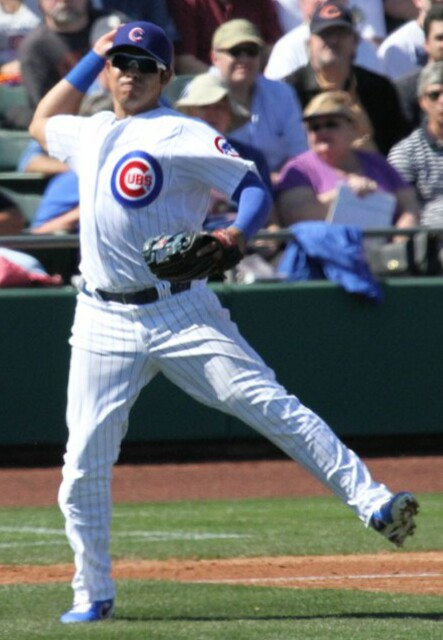
- Christian Villanueva with the Chicago Cubs in 2013 Spring Training

Saraperos de Saltillo – No. 22
- Third baseman
- Born: June 19, 1991 (age 34); Guadalajara, Jalisco, Mexico
- Bats: Right Throws: Right

Professional debut
- MLB: September 18, 2017, for the San Diego Padres
- NPB: March 31, 2019, for the Yomiuri Giants

MLB statistics (through 2018 season)
- Batting average: .245
- Home runs: 24
- Runs batted in: 53

NPB statistics (through 2020 season)
- Batting average: .222
- Home runs: 12
- Runs batted in: 43
- Stats at Baseball Reference

Teams
- San Diego Padres (2017–2018); Yomiuri Giants (2019); Hokkaido Nippon-Ham Fighters (2020)
Medals
Men's baseball
Representing Mexico
Premier12
Bronze medal – third place	2019 Tokyo	National team

Christian Iván Villanueva Limón (born June 19, 1991), nicknamed "Villa", is a Mexican professional baseball third baseman for the Saraperos de Saltillo of the Mexican League. He has previously played in Major League Baseball (MLB) for the San Diego Padres, and in Nippon Professional Baseball (NPB) for the Yomiuri Giants and Hokkaido Nippon-Ham Fighters. Villanueva won the National League's Rookie of the Month Award for April 2018.

== Career ==
=== Texas Rangers ===
Villanueva signed with the Texas Rangers as an international free agent on August 17, 2008. He missed the part of the 2009 season after having knee surgery, following his professional debut with the Dominican Summer League Rangers. Villanueva spent 2010 with the rookie-level Arizona League Rangers, batting .314/.365/.431 with two home runs, 35 RBI, and six stolen bases across 51 games. He made 126 appearances for the Single-A Hickory Crawdads in 2011, hitting .278/.338/.465 with 17 home runs, 84 RBI, and 32 stolen bases.

Villanueva began the 2012 season with the High-A Myrtle Beach Pelicans. In 100 appearances for the team, he slashed .285/.356/.421 with 10 home runs, 59 RBI, and nine stolen bases.

=== Chicago Cubs ===
On July 31, 2012, the Rangers traded Villanueva and Kyle Hendricks to the Chicago Cubs in exchange for Ryan Dempster. He spent the remainder of the year with the High-A Daytona Cubs, hitting .250 with four home runs, nine RBI, and five stolen bases in 25 games. On November 20, the Cubs added Villanueva to their 40-man roster to protect him from the Rule 5 draft.

Villanueva spent the 2013 campaign with the Double-A Tennessee Smokies, playing in 133 games and hitting .261/.317/.469 with 19 home runs and 72 RBI. By 2014, Villanueva was blocked in the Cubs' organization by fellow third baseman Kris Bryant. In 126 games split between Tennessee and the Triple-A Iowa Cubs, he batted a cumulative .230/.297/.379 with 10 home runs and 58 RBI.

Villanueva returned to Tennessee and Iowa for the 2015 season. In 129 appearances split between the two affiliates, he batted .257/.314/.438 with 20 home runs and 95 RBI. Villanueva broke his right fibula during spring training in 2016 and missed the entire season. He was non-tendered by the Cubs on December 2, 2016, and became a free agent.

=== San Diego Padres ===
On December 12, 2016, Villanueva signed a minor league contract with the San Diego Padres. Villanueva began the 2017 season with the El Paso Chihuahuas of the Triple-A Pacific Coast League. In 109 appearances for El Paso, he batted .297/.369/.528 with 20 home runs and 86 RBI. On September 18, 2017, the Padres promoted Villanueva to the major leagues. He made his major league debut that day, starting at third base. Villanueva hit .344 with four home runs and seven RBI in 32 at-bats for the Padres during his rookie campaign.

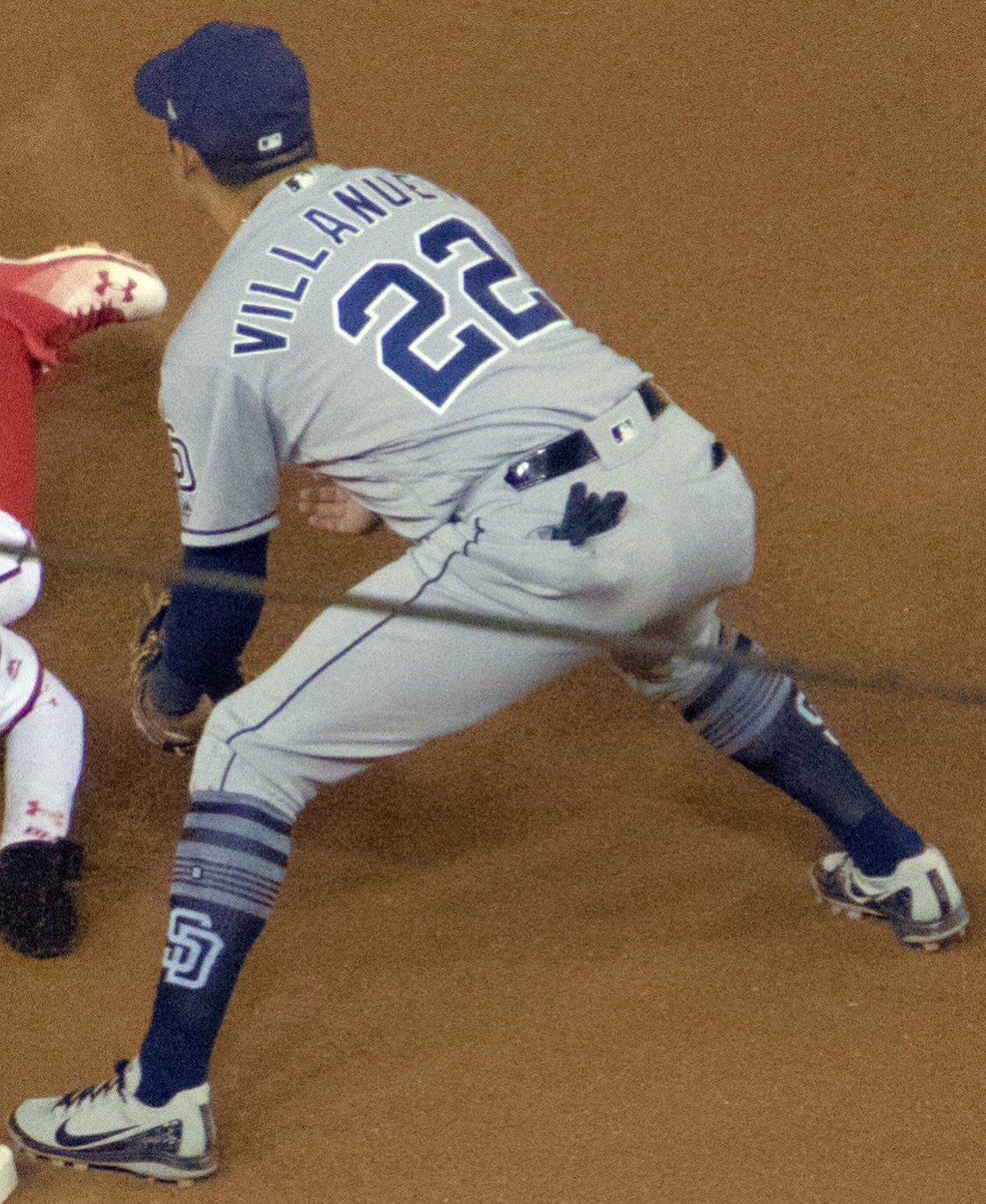
Villanueva during his tenure with the San Diego Padres in 2018

On April 3, 2018, Villanueva hit three home runs in a game against the Colorado Rockies at Petco Park. He was named the National League Rookie of the Month for the month of April 2018. In April he led all rookies in hits, runs scored, home runs, RBI, batting average, on-base percentage, slugging and total bases. In May 2018 he tied the MLB record for most home runs for a rookie born in Mexico. On August 22, Villanueva fractured his finger while fielding 2nd base and missed the remainder of the season. For the season, in 110 games, Villanueva hit .236 with 20 home runs and 46 RBI.

On November 6, 2018, Villanueva signed with the Yaquis de Obregon of the Mexican Pacific League for the 2018 winter season. On November 20, Villanueva was designated for assignment by the Padres, who sold his contract to the a team in Nippon Professional Baseball's Central League.

=== Yomiuri Giants ===
On November 21, 2018, Villanueva officially signed a one-year, $3.6;million contract with the Yomiuri Giants of Nippon Professional Baseball. In 73 games for Yomiuri, Villanueva batted .223/.325/.386 with eight home runs, 24 RBI, and two stolen bases. On December 2, 2019, he became a free agent.

=== Hokkaido Nippon-Ham Fighters ===
On December 5, 2019, Villanueva signed with the Hokkaido Nippon-Ham Fighters. In 54 games for the Fighters, he slashed .220/.321/.310 with four home runs and 19 RBI. On December 2, 2020, Villanueva became a free agent.

=== Sultanes de Monterrey ===
On April 6, 2021, Villanueva signed with the Sultanes de Monterrey of the Mexican League. In 52 games, he batted .259/.403/.426 with six home runs, 31 RBI, and two stolen bases. He spent the entire 2022 season on the reserve list and did not appear in a game.

In 2023, Villanueva returned to Monterrey. In 81 games, he slashed .315/.392/.457 with eight home runs, 53 RBI, and three stolen bases. Villanueva made 71 appearances for the Sultanes in 2024, batting .301/.366/.467 with eight home runs, 44 RBI, and eight stolen bases.

=== Rieleros de Aguascalientes ===
On April 16, 2025, Villanueva was loaned to the Rieleros de Aguascalientes for the entirety of the 2025 season. In 64 appearances for Aguascalientes, he batted .296/.409/.469 with nine home runs, 30 RBI, and seven stolen bases.

=== Saraperos de Saltillo ===
On November 19, 2025, Villanueva was returned to the Sultanes de Monterrey of the Mexican League. Villanueva was released by Monterrey prior to the start of the regular season on February 20, 2026.

On March 30, 2026, Villanueva signed with the Saraperos de Saltillo of the Mexican League.

== Personal life ==
Villanueva and his wife had a son, Christian Jr., in 2017.
