= 2022 Philadelphia Phillies season =

Major League Baseball season

2022 Philadelphia Phillies
- National League champions National League Wild Card winners
- League: National League
- Division: East
- Ballpark: Citizens Bank Park
- City: Philadelphia
- Record: 87–75 (.537)
- Divisional place: 3rd
- Owners: John Middleton
- President of baseball operations: Dave Dombrowski
- Managers: Joe Girardi (fired June 3, 2022); Rob Thomson (interim, June 3 to October 10)
- Television: NBC Sports Philadelphia; NBC Sports Philadelphia + NBC Philadelphia (Tom McCarthy, John Kruk, Ben Davis, Mike Schmidt, Rubén Amaro Jr.)
- Radio: Phillies Radio Network; WIP SportsRadio 94.1 FM (English) (Scott Franzke, Larry Andersen, Michael Bourn, Chad Durbin, Erik Kratz, Kevin Stocker); WTTM (Spanish) (Danny Martinez, Bill Kulik, Rickie Ricardo)
- Stats: ESPN.com; Baseball Reference

The 2022 Philadelphia Phillies season was the 140th season in the history of the franchise, and the 19th season for the Philadelphia Phillies at Citizens Bank Park. The Phillies went 87–75 during the regular season. They went on to win the National League pennant for the first time since 2009.

On December 2, 2021, Commissioner of Baseball Rob Manfred announced a lockout of players, following expiration of the collective bargaining agreement (CBA) between the league and the Major League Baseball Players Association (MLBPA). On March 10, 2022, MLB and the MLBPA agreed to a new collective bargaining agreement, thus ending the lockout. Opening Day was played on April 7. Although MLB previously announced that several series would be cancelled due to the lockout, the agreement provides for a 162-game season, with originally canceled games to be made up via doubleheaders.

The Phillies struggled to start the season going 21–29 over the first two months of the season. On June 3, manager Joe Girardi was dismissed from the team, and Rob Thomson was named the new interim manager. Under Thomson's watch, the Phillies went 65–46. On October 10, Thomson signed a contract extension and the interim title was removed.

On October 3, the Phillies clinched their first playoff berth since the 2011 season and defeated the St. Louis Cardinals in the National League Wild Card Series in a two-game sweep. They upset the defending World Series champion and division rival Atlanta Braves in the National League Division Series in four games and advanced to the National League Championship Series for the first time since 2010. They defeated the San Diego Padres in five games to advance to the World Series, their first World Series appearance since 2009. However, their run would end at the hands of the red-hot Houston Astros, who defeated the Phillies in six games.

== Offseason ==
=== Lockout ===
The expiration of the league's collective bargaining agreement (CBA) with the Major League Baseball Players Association occurred on December 1, 2021, with no new agreement in place. As a result, the team owners voted unanimously to lockout the players stopping all free agency and trades.

The parties came to an agreement on a new CBA on March 10, 2022.

=== Rule changes ===
Pursuant to the new CBA, several new rules were instituted for the 2022 season. The National League will adopt the designated hitter full-time, a draft lottery will be implemented, the postseason will expand from ten teams to twelve, and advertising patches will appear on player uniforms and helmets for the first time.

=== Player transactions ===
==== Players becoming free agents ====
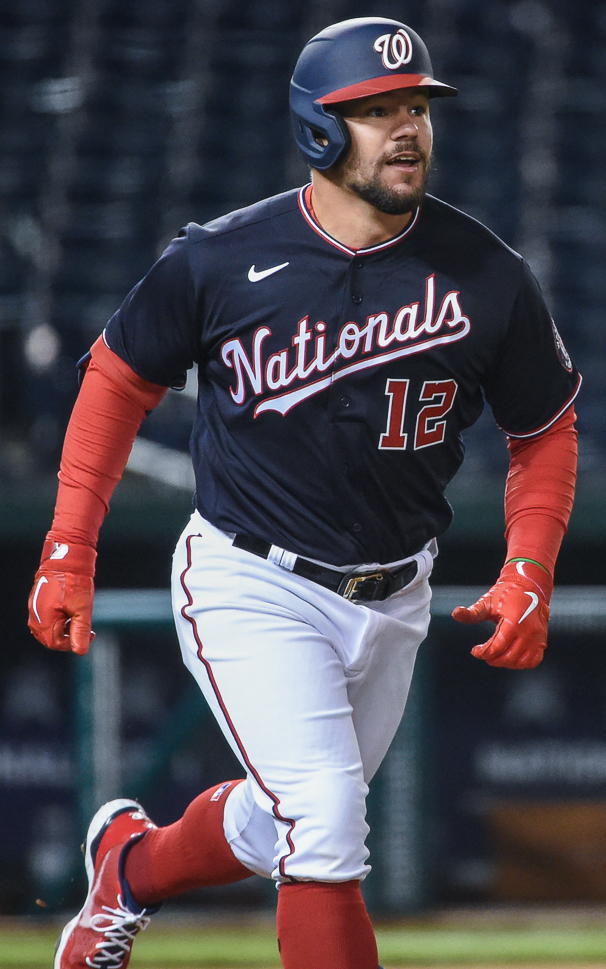
Outfielder Kyle Schwarber was one of the Phillies' biggest offseason signings

- Cam Bedrosian – Re-signed with the Phillies on a minor-league contract on December 14, 2021.
- Archie Bradley – Signed a one-year, $3.75 million contract with the Los Angeles Angels on March 18, 2022.
- Freddy Galvis – Signed a two-year contract with the Fukuoka SoftBank Hawks of Nippon Professional Baseball on December 16, 2021.
- J. D. Hammer – Signed a minor-league contract with the Colorado Rockies on December 1, 2021.
- Odúbel Herrera – Re-signed with the Phillies on a one-year contract on March 16, 2022.
- Travis Jankowski – Signed a minor-league contract with the New York Mets on March 17, 2022.
- Ian Kennedy – Signed a one-year, $4.75 million contract with the Arizona Diamondbacks on March 16, 2022.
- Andrew Knapp – Signed a minor-league contract with the Cincinnati Reds on December 1, 2021.
- Andrew McCutchen – Signed a one-year contract with the Milwaukee Brewers on March 16, 2022
- Brad Miller – Agreed to a two-year, $10 million deal with the Texas Rangers on March 16, 2022.
- Matt Moore – Signed a minor-league contract with the Texas Rangers on March 14, 2022.
- Héctor Neris – Signed a two-year, $17 million contract with the Houston Astros on December 1, 2021.
- Roman Quinn – Signed a minor-league contract with the Miami Marlins on March 12, 2022.
- Ramón Rosso – Signed a minor-league contract with the Detroit Tigers on March 14, 2022.
- Ronald Torreyes – Re-signed with the Phillies on a minor-league contract on March 20, 2022.

==== Acquisitions ====
The Phillies began their bullpen overhaul on November 5, 2021, when they claimed left-handed relief pitcher Ryan Sherriff off of waivers from the Tampa Bay Rays.

On March 15, 2022, Brad Hand and Jeurys Familia both signed one-year contracts with the Phillies. On March 20, Kyle Schwarber signed a four-year, $79 million contract, making him the Phillies' first high-tier acquisition of the offseason. On March 23, 2022, Nick Castellanos agreed to a five-year, $100 million contract with the Phillies, putting them over the luxury tax. Castellanos announced the deal by posting a picture of the Philadelphia skyline on his Instagram page.

== Roster ==
All players who made an appearance for the Phillies during 2022 are included.

2022 Philadelphia Phillies
Roster
| Pitchers: 46 José Alvarado; 22 Mark Appel; 64 Andrew Bellatti; 75 Connor Brogdon; 54 Sam Coonrod; 63 Tyler Cyr; 47 Chris Devenski; 58 Seranthony Domínguez; 71 Nick Duron; 56 Zach Eflin; 70 Bailey Falter; 31 Jeurys Familia; 44 Kyle Gibson; 52 Brad Hand; 68 Damon Jones; 67 Michael Kelly; 23 Corey Knebel; 69 Francisco Morales; 57 Nick Nelson; 48 Vinny Nittoli; 27 Aaron Nola; 49 James Norwood; 49 Michael Plassmeyer; 30 David Robertson; 79 JoJo Romero; 77 Bubby Rossman; 61 Cristopher Sánchez; 55 Ranger Suárez; 43 Noah Syndergaard; 45 Zack Wheeler | Catchers: 10 J. T. Realmuto; 39 Donny Sands; 21 Garrett Stubbs; Infielders: 28 Alec Bohm; 7 Johan Camargo; 18 Didi Gregorius; 25 Darick Hall; 17 Rhys Hoskins; 4 Scott Kingery; 41 Yairo Muñoz; 2 Jean Segura; 33 Edmundo Sosa; 5 Bryson Stott | Outfielders: 8 Nick Castellanos; 18 Dalton Guthrie; 3 Bryce Harper; 37 Odúbel Herrera; 16 Brandon Marsh; 29 Nick Maton; 35 Oscar Mercado; 16 Mickey Moniak; 40 Simón Muzziotti; 24 Roman Quinn; 12 Kyle Schwarber; 19 Matt Vierling; 18 Bradley Zimmer | Manager: 25 Joe Girardi; 59 Rob Thomson; Coaches: 95 Mike Calitri (bench); 91 Jason Camilli (assistant hitting); 65 Caleb Cotham (pitching); 9 Bobby Dickerson (infield coach); 38 Paco Figueroa (first base coach); 97 Brad Flanders (bullpen catcher); 93 Brian Kaplan (assistant pitching); 53 Kevin Long (hitting); 94 David Lundquist (bullpen); 92 Bobby Meacham (assistant coach); 98 Hector Rabago (bullpen catcher); 59 Rob Thomson (bench); 62 Dusty Wathan (third base coach) |

== Regular season ==
=== National League East ===
NL East
| Team | W | L | Pct. | GB | Home | Road |
|---|---|---|---|---|---|---|
| Atlanta Braves | 101 | 61 | .623 | — | 55‍–‍26 | 46‍–‍35 |
| New York Mets | 101 | 61 | .623 | — | 54‍–‍27 | 47‍–‍34 |
| Philadelphia Phillies | 87 | 75 | .537 | 14 | 47‍–‍34 | 40‍–‍41 |
| Miami Marlins | 69 | 93 | .426 | 32 | 34‍–‍47 | 35‍–‍46 |
| Washington Nationals | 55 | 107 | .340 | 46 | 26‍–‍55 | 29‍–‍52 |

=== National League playoff leaders ===
Division leaders
| Team | W | L | Pct. |
|---|---|---|---|
| Los Angeles Dodgers | 111 | 51 | .685 |
| Atlanta Braves | 101 | 61 | .623 |
| St. Louis Cardinals | 93 | 69 | .574 |

Wild Card teams (Top 3 teams qualify for postseason)
| Team | W | L | Pct. | GB |
|---|---|---|---|---|
| New York Mets | 101 | 61 | .623 | +14 |
| San Diego Padres | 89 | 73 | .549 | +2 |
| Philadelphia Phillies | 87 | 75 | .537 | — |
| Milwaukee Brewers | 86 | 76 | .531 | 1 |
| San Francisco Giants | 81 | 81 | .500 | 6 |
| Arizona Diamondbacks | 74 | 88 | .457 | 13 |
| Chicago Cubs | 74 | 88 | .457 | 13 |
| Miami Marlins | 69 | 93 | .426 | 18 |
| Colorado Rockies | 68 | 94 | .420 | 19 |
| Pittsburgh Pirates | 62 | 100 | .383 | 25 |
| Cincinnati Reds | 62 | 100 | .383 | 25 |
| Washington Nationals | 55 | 107 | .340 | 32 |

=== Record vs. opponents ===
2022 National League record Source: MLB Standings Grid – 2022
| Team | AZ | ATL | CHC | CIN | COL | LAD | MIA | MIL | NYM | PHI | PIT | SD | SF | STL | WSH | AL |
|---|---|---|---|---|---|---|---|---|---|---|---|---|---|---|---|---|
| Arizona | — | 2–4 | 4–3 | 3–4 | 9–10 | 5–14 | 5–1 | 4–3 | 2–4 | 3–3 | 4–3 | 5–14 | 10–9 | 2–5 | 4–3 | 12–8 |
| Atlanta | 4–2 | — | 3–3 | 4–3 | 6–1 | 2–4 | 13–6 | 3–3 | 10–9 | 11–8 | 7–0 | 3–4 | 4–3 | 4–3 | 14–5 | 13–7 |
| Chicago | 3–4 | 3–3 | — | 11–8 | 3–4 | 0–7 | 4–2 | 10–9 | 4–3 | 6–0 | 10–9 | 2–5 | 2–5 | 6–13 | 4–2 | 6–14 |
| Cincinnati | 4–3 | 3–4 | 8–11 | — | 2–4 | 0–7 | 4–3 | 6–13 | 1–5 | 1–6 | 7–12 | 0–6 | 4–2 | 7–12 | 3–4 | 12–8 |
| Colorado | 10–9 | 1–6 | 4–3 | 4–2 | — | 8–11 | 2–4 | 3–4 | 2–5 | 2–5 | 3–3 | 10–9 | 5–14 | 2–4 | 3–4 | 9–11 |
| Los Angeles | 14–5 | 4–2 | 7–0 | 7–0 | 11–8 | — | 6–1 | 4–3 | 3–4 | 3–4 | 1–5 | 14–5 | 15–4 | 4–2 | 3–3 | 15–5 |
| Miami | 1–5 | 6–13 | 2–4 | 3–4 | 4–2 | 1–6 | — | 4–3 | 6–13 | 7–12 | 4–3 | 3–4 | 3–4 | 2–4 | 15–4 | 8–12 |
| Milwaukee | 3–4 | 3–3 | 9–10 | 13–6 | 4–3 | 3–4 | 3–4 | — | 2–4 | 2–4 | 11–8 | 3–4 | 3–4 | 9–10 | 3–3 | 15–5 |
| New York | 4–2 | 9–10 | 3–4 | 5–1 | 5–2 | 4–3 | 13–6 | 4–2 | — | 14–5 | 6–1 | 2–4 | 4–3 | 5–2 | 14–5 | 9–11 |
| Philadelphia | 3–3 | 8–11 | 0–6 | 6–1 | 5–2 | 4–3 | 12–7 | 4–2 | 5–14 | — | 6–1 | 4–3 | 1–5 | 4–3 | 16–3 | 9–11 |
| Pittsburgh | 3–4 | 0–7 | 9–10 | 12–7 | 3–3 | 5–1 | 3–4 | 8–11 | 1–6 | 1–6 | — | 2–4 | 1–5 | 6–13 | 4–3 | 4–16 |
| San Diego | 14–5 | 4–3 | 5–2 | 6–0 | 9–10 | 5–14 | 4–3 | 4–3 | 4–2 | 3–4 | 4–2 | — | 13–6 | 2–4 | 4–3 | 8–12 |
| San Francisco | 9–10 | 3–4 | 5–2 | 2–4 | 14–5 | 4–15 | 4–3 | 4–3 | 3–4 | 5–1 | 5–1 | 6–13 | — | 3–4 | 4–2 | 10–10 |
| St. Louis | 5–2 | 3–4 | 13–6 | 12–7 | 4–2 | 2–4 | 4–2 | 10–9 | 2–5 | 3–4 | 13–6 | 4–2 | 4–3 | — | 4–3 | 10–10 |
| Washington | 3–4 | 5–14 | 2–4 | 4–3 | 4–3 | 3–3 | 4–15 | 3–3 | 5–14 | 3–16 | 3–4 | 3–4 | 2–4 | 3–4 | — | 8–12 |

Updated with the results of all games through October 5, 2022.

=== Game log ===
Legend
| | Phillies win |
| | Phillies loss |
| | Postponement |
| | Clinched playoff spot |
| **Bold** | Phillies team member |

2022 Game Log: 87–75 (Home: 47–34; Away: 40–41)
April: 11–11 (Home: 8–5; Away: 3–6)

| # | Date | Opponent | Score | Win | Loss | Save | Attendance | Record |
|---|---|---|---|---|---|---|---|---|
| 1 | April 8 | Athletics | 9–5 | **Aaron Nola** (1–0) | Frankie Montas (0–1) | — | 44,232 | 1–0 |
| 2 | April 9 | Athletics | 4–2 | **Kyle Gibson** (1–0) | Cole Irvin (0–1) | **Corey Knebel** (1) | 41,622 | 2–0 |
| 3 | April 10 | Athletics | 1–4 | Daulton Jefferies (1–0) | **Bailey Falter** (0–1) | — | 33,507 | 2–1 |
| 4 | April 11 | Mets | 5–4 | **Seranthony Domínguez** (1–0) | Seth Lugo (0–1) | **Brad Hand** (1) | 22,317 | 3–1 |
| 5 | April 12 | Mets | 0–2 | Tylor Megill (2–0) | **Zack Wheeler** (0–1) | Edwin Díaz (1) | 26,045 | 3–2 |
| 6 | April 13 | Mets | 6–9 | Max Scherzer (2–0) | **Aaron Nola** (1–1) | — | 31,190 | 3–3 |
| 7 | April 14 | @ Marlins | 3–4 | Sandy Alcántara (1–0) | **Kyle Gibson** (1–1) | Anthony Bender (2) | 31,184 | 3–4 |
| 8 | April 15 | @ Marlins | 1–7 | Pablo López (1–0) | **Zach Eflin** (0–1) | — | 11,990 | 3–5 |
| 9 | April 16 | @ Marlins | 10–3 | **Ranger Suárez** (1–0) | Trevor Rogers (0–2) | — | 13,412 | 4–5 |
| 10 | April 17 | @ Marlins | 3–11 | Elieser Hernández (1–1) | **Zack Wheeler** (0–2) | — | 11,476 | 4–6 |
| 11 | April 18 | @ Rockies | 1–4 | Chad Kuhl (1–0) | **Aaron Nola** (1–2) | Álex Colomé (1) | 20,403 | 4–7 |
| 12 | April 19 | @ Rockies | 5–6 | Justin Lawrence (1–0) | **Seranthony Domínguez** (1–1) | Daniel Bard (5) | 23,800 | 4–8 |
| 13 | April 20 | @ Rockies | 9–6 | **Brad Hand** (1–0) | Jhoulys Chacín (2–1) | **Corey Knebel** (2) | 21,490 | 5–8 |
| 14 | April 22 | Brewers | 4–2 | **Nick Nelson** (1–0) | Aaron Ashby (0–2) | **Corey Knebel** (3) | 29,285 | 6–8 |
| 15 | April 23 | Brewers | 3–5 | Adrian Houser (1–2) | **Zack Wheeler** (0–3) | Josh Hader (7) | 30,612 | 6–9 |
| 16 | April 24 | Brewers | 0–1 | Devin Williams (1–0) | **Corey Knebel** (0–1) | Josh Hader (8) | 26,175 | 6–10 |
| 17 | April 25 | Rockies | 8–2 | **Kyle Gibson** (2–1) | Kyle Freeland (0–3) | — | 20,130 | 7–10 |
| 18 | April 26 | Rockies | 10–3 | **Zach Eflin** (1–1) | Germán Márquez (0–1) | — | 22,300 | 8–10 |
| 19 | April 27 | Rockies | 7–3 | **Ranger Suárez** (2–0) | Ryan Feltner (0–1) | — | 20,127 | 9–10 |
| 20 | April 28 | Rockies | 7–1 | **Zack Wheeler** (1–3) | Austin Gomber (1–2) | — | 20,098 | 10–10 |
| 21 | April 29 | @ Mets | 0–3 | Tylor Megill (4–0) | **Aaron Nola** (1–3) | Edwin Díaz (4) | 32,416 | 10–11 |
| 22 | April 30 | @ Mets | 4–1 | **James Norwood** (1–0) | Adam Ottavino (1–1) | **Corey Knebel** (4) | 40,036 | 11–11 |

May: 10–18 (Home: 3–10; Away: 7–8)

| # | Date | Opponent | Score | Win | Loss | Save | Attendance | Record |
|---|---|---|---|---|---|---|---|---|
| 23 | May 1 | @ Mets | 6–10 | Max Scherzer (4–0) | **Zach Eflin** (1–2) | — | 30,608 | 11–12 |
| 24 | May 3 | Rangers | 4–6 | Brock Burke (3–0) | **Ranger Suárez** (2–1) | Joe Barlow (2) | 27,788 | 11–13 |
| 25 | May 4 | Rangers | 1–2 (10) | Matt Bush (1–1) | **Brad Hand** (1–1) | Joe Barlow (3) | 21,315 | 11–14 |
| 26 | May 5 | Mets | 7–8 | Adonis Medina (1–0) | **Corey Knebel** (0–2) | Edwin Díaz (6) | 24,040 | 11–15 |
| — | May 6 | Mets | Postponed (rain); Makeup: August 20 as a split doubleheader | | | | | |
| — | May 7 | Mets | Postponed (rain); Makeup: May 8 as a traditional doubleheader | | | | | |
| 27 | May 8 (1) | Mets | 3–2 | **Kyle Gibson** (3–1) | Max Scherzer (4–1) | **Corey Knebel** (5) | see 2nd game | 12–15 |
| 28 | May 8 (2) | Mets | 1–6 | Chris Bassitt (4–2) | **Cristopher Sánchez** (0–1) | — | 37,133 | 12–16 |
| 29 | May 9 | @ Mariners | 9–0 | **Ranger Suárez** (3–1) | Chris Flexen (1–5) | — | 15,881 | 13–16 |
| 30 | May 10 | @ Mariners | 4–5 | Robbie Ray (3–3) | **Aaron Nola** (1–4) | Paul Sewald (1) | 16,442 | 13–17 |
| 31 | May 11 | @ Mariners | 4–2 | **Seranthony Domínguez** (2–1) | Logan Gilbert (4–1) | **Corey Knebel** (6) | 16,387 | 14–17 |
| 32 | May 12 | @ Dodgers | 9–7 | **Andrew Bellatti** (1–0) | Daniel Hudson (1–3) | **Corey Knebel** (7) | 46,539 | 15–17 |
| 33 | May 13 | @ Dodgers | 12–10 (10) | **Jeurys Familia** (1–0) | Brusdar Graterol (0–2) | **Francisco Morales** (1) | 50,712 | 16–17 |
| 34 | May 14 | @ Dodgers | 8–3 | **Ranger Suárez** (4–1) | Julio Urías (2–3) | — | 50,279 | 17–17 |
| 35 | May 15 | @ Dodgers | 4–5 | Shane Greene (1–0) | **Corey Knebel** (0–3) | — | 51,869 | 17–18 |
| 36 | May 17 | Padres | 0–3 | Mike Clevinger (1–0) | **Zach Eflin** (1–3) | Taylor Rogers (14) | 29,200 | 17–19 |
| 37 | May 18 | Padres | 3–0 | **Zack Wheeler** (2–3) | Blake Snell (0–1) | **Corey Knebel** (8) | 27,655 | 18–19 |
| 38 | May 19 | Padres | 0–2 | Yu Darvish (4–1) | **Kyle Gibson** (3–2) | Taylor Rogers (15) | 30,146 | 18–20 |
| 39 | May 20 | Dodgers | 1–4 | Julio Urías (3–3) | **Ranger Suárez** (4–2) | Craig Kimbrel (8) | 30,025 | 18–21 |
| 40 | May 21 | Dodgers | 4–7 | Daniel Hudson (2–3) | **José Alvarado** (0–1) | Craig Kimbrel (9) | 32,068 | 18–22 |
| 41 | May 22 | Dodgers | 4–3 (10) | **Corey Knebel** (1–3) | Evan Phillips (1–2) | — | 34,021 | 19–22 |
| 42 | May 23 | @ Braves | 7–3 | **Zack Wheeler** (3–3) | Tucker Davidson (1–1) | — | 41,762 | 20–22 |
| 43 | May 24 | @ Braves | 5–6 | Kenley Jansen (3–0) | **Nick Nelson** (1–1) | — | 32,274 | 20–23 |
| 44 | May 25 | @ Braves | 4–8 | Spencer Strider (1–1) | **Ranger Suárez** (4–3) | — | 29,339 | 20–24 |
| 45 | May 26 | @ Braves | 4–1 | **Aaron Nola** (2–4) | Kyle Wright (4–3) | — | 33,188 | 21–24 |
| 46 | May 27 | @ Mets | 6–8 | Carlos Carrasco (5–1) | **Bailey Falter** (0–2) | Edwin Díaz (11) | 30,175 | 21–25 |
| 47 | May 28 | @ Mets | 2–8 | Taijuan Walker (3–0) | **Zach Eflin** (1–4) | — | 37,455 | 21–26 |
| 48 | May 29 | @ Mets | 4–5 (10) | Edwin Díaz (2–1) | **Corey Knebel** (1–4) | — | 36,513 | 21–27 |
| 49 | May 30 | Giants | 4–5 (10) | Dominic Leone (3–0) | **Andrew Bellatti** (1–1) | Camilo Doval (8) | 26,650 | 21–28 |
| 50 | May 31 | Giants | 4–7 (11) | José Álvarez (2–1) | **Andrew Bellatti** (1–2) | — | 20,927 | 21–29 |

June: 19–8 (Home: 9–4; Away: 10–4)

| # | Date | Opponent | Score | Win | Loss | Save | Attendance | Record |
|---|---|---|---|---|---|---|---|---|
| 51 | June 1 | Giants | 6–5 | **Aaron Nola** (3–4) | Jarlin García (1–2) | **Corey Knebel** (9) | 22,213 | 22–29 |
| 52 | June 3 | Angels | 10–0 | **Zach Eflin** (2–4) | Chase Silseth (1–2) | — | 28,721 | 23–29 |
| 53 | June 4 | Angels | 7–2 | **Zack Wheeler** (4–3) | Michael Lorenzen (5–3) | — | 36,313 | 24–29 |
| 54 | June 5 | Angels | 9–7 | **Corey Knebel** (2–4) | Raisel Iglesias (1–4) | — | 34,801 | 25–29 |
| 55 | June 7 | @ Brewers | 3–2 | **Connor Brogdon** (1–0) | Josh Hader (0–1) | **Corey Knebel** (10) | 27,109 | 26–29 |
| 56 | June 8 | @ Brewers | 10–0 | **Aaron Nola** (4–4) | Adrian Houser (3–6) | — | 29,353 | 27–29 |
| 57 | June 9 | @ Brewers | 8–3 | **Seranthony Domínguez** (3–1) | Corbin Burnes (3–4) | — | 27,306 | 28–29 |
| 58 | June 10 | Diamondbacks | 7–5 | **Kyle Gibson** (4–2) | Zac Gallen (4–2) | **Corey Knebel** (11) | 37,423 | 29–29 |
| 59 | June 11 | Diamondbacks | 4–0 | **Zack Wheeler** (5–3) | Madison Bumgarner (2–6) | — | 30,820 | 30–29 |
| 60 | June 12 | Diamondbacks | 1–13 | Luke Weaver (1–0) | **Ranger Suárez** (4–4) | — | 41,218 | 30–30 |
| 61 | June 13 | Marlins | 3–2 | **Seranthony Domínguez** (4–1) | Anthony Bass (1–3) | — | 22,701 | 31–30 |
| 62 | June 14 | Marlins | 9–11 | Steven Okert (3–0) | **Corey Knebel** (2–5) | Tanner Scott (5) | 28,073 | 31–31 |
| 63 | June 15 | Marlins | 3–1 | **Connor Brogdon** (2–0) | Tanner Scott (2–2) | — | 24,726 | 32–31 |
| 64 | June 16 | @ Nationals | 10–1 | **Zack Wheeler** (6–3) | Patrick Corbin (3–9) | — | 19,944 | 33–31 |
| 65 | June 17 (1) | @ Nationals | 5–3 | **Ranger Suárez** (5–4) | Joan Adon (1–11) | **Brad Hand** (2) | 15,501 | 34–31 |
| 66 | June 17 (2) | @ Nationals | 8–7 (10) | **José Alvarado** (1–1) | Steve Cishek (0–2) | — | 24,785 | 35–31 |
| 67 | June 18 | @ Nationals | 2–1 (10) | **Brad Hand** (2–1) | Reed Garrett (0–1) | **Seranthony Domínguez** (1) | 42,730 | 36–31 |
| 68 | June 19 | @ Nationals | 3–9 | Jackson Tetreault (1–1) | **Zach Eflin** (2–5) | — | 32,261 | 36–32 |
| 69 | June 21 | @ Rangers | 0–7 | Martín Pérez (5–2) | **Kyle Gibson** (4–3) | — | 29,153 | 36–33 |
| 70 | June 22 | @ Rangers | 2–4 | Jon Gray (3–3) | **Zack Wheeler** (6–4) | Joe Barlow (13) | 20,704 | 36–34 |
| 71 | June 23 | @ Padres | 6–2 | **Ranger Suárez** (6–4) | Joe Musgrove (8–1) | — | 40,355 | 37–34 |
| 72 | June 24 | @ Padres | 0–1 | Nabil Crismatt (4–0) | **Aaron Nola** (4–5) | Taylor Rogers (22) | 38,890 | 37–35 |
| 73 | June 25 | @ Padres | 4–2 | **Zach Eflin** (3–5) | Blake Snell (0–5) | **Seranthony Domínguez** (2) | 37,467 | 38–35 |
| 74 | June 26 | @ Padres | 8–5 | **Nick Nelson** (2–1) | Nabil Crismatt (4–1) | **Andrew Bellatti** (1) | 41,620 | 39–35 |
| 75 | June 28 | Braves | 3–5 | Collin McHugh (1–1) | **Andrew Bellatti** (1–3) | A. J. Minter (1) | 27,725 | 39–36 |
| 76 | June 29 | Braves | 1–4 | Kyle Wright (9–4) | **Ranger Suárez** (6–5) | Will Smith (3) | 25,621 | 39–37 |
| 77 | June 30 | Braves | 14–4 | **Aaron Nola** (5–5) | Ian Anderson (6–5) | — | 30,131 | 40–37 |

July: 15–10 (Home: 6–6; Away: 9–4)

| # | Date | Opponent | Score | Win | Loss | Save | Attendance | Record |
|---|---|---|---|---|---|---|---|---|
| 78 | July 1 | Cardinals | 5–3 | **José Alvarado** (2–1) | Miles Mikolas (5–6) | **Brad Hand** (3) | 36,077 | 41–37 |
| 79 | July 2 | Cardinals | 6–7 | Ryan Helsley (4–1) | **Seranthony Domínguez** (4–2) | — | 27,657 | 41–38 |
| 80 | July 3 | Cardinals | 4–0 | **Zack Wheeler** (7–4) | Adam Wainwright (6–6) | — | 44,225 | 42–38 |
| 81 | July 5 | Nationals | 11–0 | **Cristopher Sánchez** (1–1) | Paolo Espino (0–2) | — | 20,217 | 43–38 |
| 82 | July 6 | Nationals | 2–3 | Josiah Gray (7–5) | **Aaron Nola** (5–6) | Tanner Rainey (12) | 22,369 | 43–39 |
| 83 | July 7 | Nationals | 5–3 | **Nick Nelson** (3–1) | Joan Adon (1–12) | **Seranthony Domínguez** (3) | 22,104 | 44–39 |
| 84 | July 8 | @ Cardinals | 2–0 | **Zack Wheeler** (8–4) | Adam Wainwright (6–7) | **Brad Hand** (4) | 41,100 | 45–39 |
| 85 | July 9 | @ Cardinals | 1–0 | **José Alvarado** (3–1) | Giovanny Gallegos (2–3) | **Corey Knebel** (12) | 41,853 | 46–39 |
| 86 | July 10 | @ Cardinals | 3–4 | Jordan Hicks (2–4) | **Seranthony Domínguez** (4–3) | Ryan Helsley (7) | 36,112 | 46–40 |
| 87 | July 11 | @ Cardinals | 1–6 | Miles Mikolas (6–7) | **Aaron Nola** (5–7) | — | 34,399 | 46–41 |
| 88 | July 12 | @ Blue Jays | 3–4 | José Berríos (7–4) | **Jeurys Familia** (1–1) | Jordan Romano (19) | 32,795 | 46–42 |
| 89 | July 13 | @ Blue Jays | 2–8 | Ross Stripling (5–3) | **Zack Wheeler** (8–5) | — | 30,853 | 46–43 |
| 90 | July 15 | @ Marlins | 2–1 | **Kyle Gibson** (5–3) | Sandy Alcántara (9–4) | **Seranthony Domínguez** (4) | 10,193 | 47–43 |
| 91 | July 16 | @ Marlins | 10–0 | **Ranger Suárez** (7–5) | Max Meyer (0–1) | — | 13,497 | 48–43 |
| 92 | July 17 | @ Marlins | 4–0 | **Aaron Nola** (6–7) | Trevor Rogers (4–9) | **José Alvarado** (1) | 12,450 | 49–43 |
| – | July 19 | **2022 Major League Baseball All-Star Game at Dodger Stadium in Los Angeles** | | | | | | |
| 93 | July 22 | Cubs | 2–15 | Justin Steele (4–6) | **Kyle Gibson** (5–4) | — | 27,775 | 49–44 |
| 94 | July 23 | Cubs | 2–6 (10) | David Robertson (3–0) | **José Alvarado** (3–2) | — | 38,542 | 49–45 |
| 95 | July 24 | Cubs | 3–4 | Drew Smyly (3–5) | **Bailey Falter** (0–3) | David Robertson (14) | 29,079 | 49–46 |
| 96 | July 25 | Braves | 6–4 | **Andrew Bellatti** (2–3) | A. J. Minter (4–3) | **Seranthony Domínguez** (5) | 25,452 | 50–46 |
| 97 | July 26 | Braves | 3–6 | Spencer Strider (5–3) | **Aaron Nola** (6–8) | Kenley Jansen (23) | 27,486 | 50–47 |
| 98 | July 27 | Braves | 7–2 | **Kyle Gibson** (6–4) | Charlie Morton (5–5) | — | 29,038 | 51–47 |
| 99 | July 28 | @ Pirates | 8–7 | **Zack Wheeler** (9–5) | Zach Thompson (3–8) | **Seranthony Domínguez** (6) | 20,701 | 52–47 |
| 100 | July 29 | @ Pirates | 4–2 (10) | **Seranthony Domínguez** (5–3) | Duane Underwood Jr. (0–3) | **Connor Brogdon** (1) | 26,946 | 53–47 |
| 101 | July 30 | @ Pirates | 2–1 (10) | **Corey Knebel** (3–5) | Yerry De Los Santos (0–3) | — | 38,781 | 54–47 |
| 102 | July 31 | @ Pirates | 8–2 | **Aaron Nola** (7–8) | JT Brubaker (2–9) | — | 19,322 | 55–47 |

August: 18–11 (Home: 13–5; Away: 5–6)

| # | Date | Opponent | Score | Win | Loss | Save | Attendance | Record |
|---|---|---|---|---|---|---|---|---|
| 103 | August 2 | @ Braves | 1–13 | Spencer Strider (6–3) | **Nick Nelson** (3–2) | — | 38,932 | 55–48 |
| 104 | August 3 | @ Braves | 3–1 | **Zack Wheeler** (10–5) | Collin McHugh (2–2) | **David Robertson** (15) | 30,380 | 56–48 |
| 105 | August 4 | Nationals | 5–4 (5) | **Noah Syndergaard** (6–8) | Paolo Espino (0–4) | — | 35,393 | 57–48 |
| 106 | August 5 | Nationals | 7–2 | **Kyle Gibson** (7–4) | Josiah Gray (7–8) | — | 22,024 | 58–48 |
| 107 | August 6 | Nationals | 11–5 | **Ranger Suárez** (8–5) | Patrick Corbin (4–16) | — | 27,078 | 59–48 |
| 108 | August 7 | Nationals | 13–1 | **Aaron Nola** (8–8) | Cory Abbott (0–1) | — | 28,672 | 60–48 |
| 109 | August 9 | Marlins | 4–1 | **Zack Wheeler** (11–5) | Braxton Garrett (2–6) | **Seranthony Domínguez** (7) | 22,087 | 61–48 |
| 110 | August 10 | Marlins | 4–3 | **Andrew Bellatti** (3–3) | Sandy Alcántara (10–5) | **Seranthony Domínguez** (8) | 23,021 | 62–48 |
| 111 | August 11 | Marlins | 0–3 | Edward Cabrera (3–1) | **Kyle Gibson** (7–5) | Tanner Scott (16) | 25,444 | 62–49 |
| 112 | August 12 | @ Mets | 2–1 (10) | **Seranthony Domínguez** (6–3) | Mychal Givens (6–3) | **David Robertson** (16) | 38,467 | 63–49 |
| 113 | August 13 | @ Mets | 0–1 | Jacob deGrom (2–0) | **Aaron Nola** (8–9) | Edwin Díaz (27) | 43,857 | 63–50 |
| 114 | August 14 | @ Mets | 0–6 | Chris Bassitt (10–7) | **Zack Wheeler** (11–6) | — | 40,513 | 63–51 |
| 115 | August 15 | @ Reds | 4–3 | **Noah Syndergaard** (7–8) | Mike Minor (1–10) | **Seranthony Domínguez** (9) | 14,635 | 64–51 |
| 116 | August 16 | @ Reds | 11–4 | **Kyle Gibson** (8–5) | T. J. Zeuch (0–2) | — | 17,074 | 65–51 |
| 117 | August 17 | @ Reds | 0–1 | Alexis Díaz (4–1) | **Seranthony Domínguez** (6–4) | — | 13,622 | 65–52 |
| 118 | August 19 | Mets | 2–7 | Chris Bassitt (11–7) | **Aaron Nola** (8–10) | — | 43,176 | 65–53 |
| 119 | August 20 (1) | Mets | 2–8 | Seth Lugo (3–2) | **Zack Wheeler** (11–7) | — | 36,809 | 65–54 |
| 120 | August 20 (2) | Mets | 4–1 | **Bailey Falter** (1–3) | David Peterson (6–3) | **David Robertson** (17) | 39,374 | 66–54 |
| 121 | August 21 | Mets | 9–10 | Trevor May (2–0) | **David Robertson** (3–1) | Edwin Díaz (28) | 35,801 | 66–55 |
| 122 | August 22 | Reds | 4–1 | **Noah Syndergaard** (8–8) | Luis Cessa (3–2) | **Andrew Bellatti** (2) | 19,166 | 67–55 |
| 123 | August 23 | Reds | 7–6 | **Brad Hand** (3–1) | Alexis Díaz (4–2) | — | 20,220 | 68–55 |
| 124 | August 24 | Reds | 7–5 | **Cristopher Sánchez** (2–1) | T. J. Zeuch (0–3) | **David Robertson** (18) | 24,400 | 69–55 |
| 125 | August 25 | Reds | 4–0 | **Aaron Nola** (9–10) | Justin Dunn (1–2) | — | 21,123 | 70–55 |
| 126 | August 26 | Pirates | 7–4 | **Bailey Falter** (2–3) | Bryse Wilson (2–8) | **Brad Hand** (5) | 30,546 | 71–55 |
| 127 | August 27 | Pirates | 6–0 | **Kyle Gibson** (9–5) | Tyler Beede (1–4) | — | 37,105 | 72–55 |
| 128 | August 28 | Pirates | 0–5 | Roansy Contreras (4–4) | **Noah Syndergaard** (8–9) | — | 30,355 | 72–56 |
| 129 | August 29 | @ Diamondbacks | 7–13 | Luis Frías (1–0) | **Cristopher Sánchez** (2–2) | — | 18,594 | 72–57 |
| 130 | August 30 | @ Diamondbacks | 3–12 | Zac Gallen (10–2) | **Aaron Nola** (9–11) | — | 16,873 | 72–58 |
| 131 | August 31 | @ Diamondbacks | 18–2 | **Bailey Falter** (3–3) | Tommy Henry (3–3) | — | 13,690 | 73–58 |

September: 11–14 (Home: 8–4; Away: 3–10)

| # | Date | Opponent | Score | Win | Loss | Save | Attendance | Record |
|---|---|---|---|---|---|---|---|---|
| 132 | September 2 | @ Giants | 1–13 | Alex Cobb (5–6) | **Kyle Gibson** (9–6) | — | 32,840 | 73–59 |
| 133 | September 3 | @ Giants | 4–5 | Zack Littell (2–2) | **Brad Hand** (3–2) | Camilo Doval (19) | 40,010 | 73–60 |
| 134 | September 4 | @ Giants | 3–5 | Camilo Doval (5–6) | **David Robertson** (3–2) | — | 41,189 | 73–61 |
| 135 | September 6 | Marlins | 3–2 | **David Robertson** (4–2) | Tommy Nance (0–3) | — | 17,145 | 74–61 |
| 136 | September 7 | Marlins | 4–3 | **Bailey Falter** (4–3) | Trevor Rogers (4–11) | **Connor Brogdon** (2) | 17,755 | 75–61 |
| 137 | September 8 | Marlins | 5–6 | Dylan Floro (1–2) | **David Robertson** (4–3) | — | 19,073 | 75–62 |
| 138 | September 9 | Nationals | 5–3 | **Noah Syndergaard** (9–9) | Patrick Corbin (6–18) | **Nick Nelson** (1) | 22,304 | 76–62 |
| 139 | September 10 | Nationals | 8–5 | **Ranger Suárez** (9–5) | Erick Fedde (6–10) | — | 37,185 | 77–62 |
| 140 | September 11 | Nationals | 7–5 | **José Alvarado** (4–2) | Kyle Finnegan (5–4) | **David Robertson** (19) | 23,802 | 78–62 |
| 141 | September 13 | @ Marlins | 2–1 | **Bailey Falter** (5–3) | Sandy Alcántara (12–8) | **David Robertson** (20) | 5,801 | 79–62 |
| 142 | September 14 | @ Marlins | 6–1 | **Kyle Gibson** (10–6) | Edward Cabrera (5–3) | — | 5,632 | 80–62 |
| 143 | September 15 | @ Marlins | 3–5 | Pablo López (9–10) | **Noah Syndergaard** (9–10) | Dylan Floro (5) | 7,877 | 80–63 |
| 144 | September 16 | @ Braves | 2–7 | Jesse Chavez (4–1) | **Seranthony Domínguez** (6–5) | — | 42,578 | 80–64 |
| 145 | September 17 | @ Braves | 3–4 | Dylan Lee (4–1) | **Aaron Nola** (9–12) | Kenley Jansen (34) | 42,542 | 80–65 |
| 146 | September 18 | @ Braves | 2–5 | Spencer Strider (11–5) | **Connor Brogdon** (2–1) | — | 42,015 | 80–66 |
| 147 | September 20 | Blue Jays | 11–18 | Zach Pop (3–0) | **Kyle Gibson** (10–7) | — | 21,129 | 80–67 |
| 148 | September 21 | Blue Jays | 4–3 (10) | **Andrew Bellatti** (4–3) | Adam Cimber (10–6) | — | 29,363 | 81–67 |
| 149 | September 22 | Braves | 1–0 | **Ranger Suárez** (10–5) | Max Fried (13–7) | **José Alvarado** (2) | 21,276 | 82–67 |
| 150 | September 23 | Braves | 9–1 | **Aaron Nola** (10–12) | Jake Odorizzi (5–6) | — | 28,013 | 83–67 |
| 151 | September 24 | Braves | 3–6 | Kyle Wright (20–5) | **Bailey Falter** (5–4) | Kenley Jansen (37) | 36,692 | 83–68 |
| 152 | September 25 | Braves | 7–8 (11) | Jackson Stephens (3–2) | **Andrew Bellatti** (4–4) | — | 32,090 | 83–69 |
| 153 | September 27 | @ Cubs | 1–2 | Marcus Stroman (5–7) | **Connor Brogdon** (2–2) | Manuel Rodríguez (3) | 32,069 | 83–70 |
| 154 | September 28 | @ Cubs | 2–4 | Hayden Wesneski (3–1) | **Aaron Nola** (10–13) | Manuel Rodríguez (4) | 29,368 | 83–71 |
| 155 | September 29 | @ Cubs | 0–2 | Javier Assad (2–2) | **Ranger Suárez** (10–6) | Keegan Thompson (1) | 23,425 | 83–72 |
| 156 | September 30 (1) | @ Nationals | 5–1 | **Bailey Falter** (6–4) | Erick Fedde (6–12) | — | 24,682 | 84–72 |
| — | September 30 (2) | @ Nationals | Postponed (rain); Makeup: October 1 as a split doubleheader | | | | | |

October: 3–3 (Home: 0–0; Away: 3–3)

| # | Date | Opponent | Score | Win | Loss | Save | Attendance | Record |
|---|---|---|---|---|---|---|---|---|
| 157 | October 1 (1) | @ Nationals | 4–13 | Aníbal Sánchez (4–6) | **Kyle Gibson** (10–8) | — | 29,808 | 84–73 |
| 158 | October 1 (2) | @ Nationals | 8–2 | **Noah Syndergaard** (10–10) | Tommy Romero (1–1) | **Cristopher Sánchez** (1) | 36,841 | 85–73 |
| – | October 1 | @ Nationals | Rescheduled (Hurricane Ian forecast); Moved to September 30 as a split doubleheader | | | | | |
| 159 | October 2 | @ Nationals | 8–1 (6) | **Zack Wheeler** (12–7) | Patrick Corbin (6–19) | — | 32,779 | 86–73 |
| 160 | October 3 | @ Astros | 3–0 | **Aaron Nola** (11–13) | Lance McCullers Jr. (4–2) | **Zach Eflin** (1) | 32,324 | 87–73 |
| 161 | October 4 | @ Astros | 0–10 | Justin Verlander (18–4) | **Ranger Suárez** (10–7) | — | 32,032 | 87–74 |
| 162 | October 5 | @ Astros | 2–3 | Framber Valdez (17–6) | **Michael Plassmeyer** (0–1) | Ryan Pressly (33) | 32,432 | 87–75 |

=== Season summary ===
==== April ====
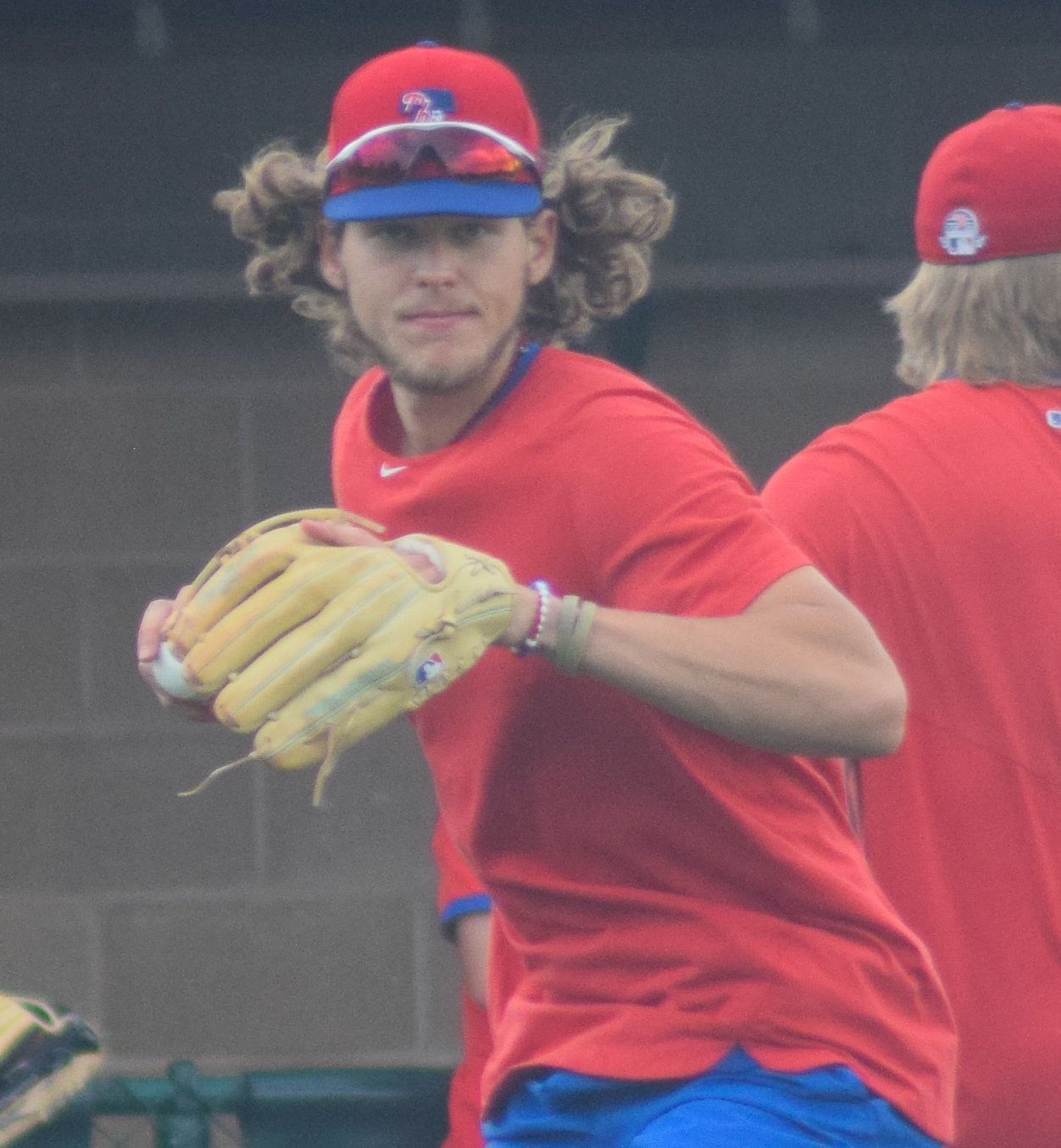
The Phillies struggled in April and May posting a record of 21–29. Third baseman Alec Bohm struggled particularly in the early stretch of the season.

Because the 2021–22 MLB lockout delayed the beginning of the 2022 MLB season, the Phillies' Opening Day game against the Oakland Athletics took place on April 8. Aaron Nola made his fifth consecutive Opening Day start, the longest such streak of any Phillies pitcher since Steve Carlton opened every season from 1977 to 1986. Offseason acquisition Kyle Schwarber, batting in the leadoff position, hit a home run in his first at bat, while rookie Bryson Stott, making his MLB debut, recorded his first career hit in the sixth inning. Although Nola allowed a three-run home run in the seventh inning, the lineup continued to score, and the Phillies won 9–6 to start the season. Kyle Gibson started the next game on April 9, earning the win as he struck out 10 batters for only the fourth time in his MLB career. Offensively, other free agent signee Nick Castellanos hit his first home run of the season in the first inning, and the Phillies sealed the win 4–2 following consecutive home runs from Rhys Hoskins and Jean Segura. Philadelphia was unable to sweep the Athletics, however, as a lack of offensive power led to a 4–1 loss on April 10. The Phillies' one run came on a solo home run from Segura in the ninth inning.

After a strong opening series against the Athletics, the Phillies began to struggle losing eight out of their next ten games. In the fourth game of the season, third baseman Alec Bohm made three fielding errors over three innings and was seen saying "I fucking hate this place." Bohm apologized for the comments saying "I don't mean that and emotions got the best of me." The next night, he was given a standing ovation by Phillies fans. The team continued to remain inconsistent through late April. They completed a four game sweep of the Colorado Rockies only to be no hit by the New York Mets the next day.

In early April reigning MVP, Bryce Harper began experiencing pain in his throwing elbow preventing him from playing in the outfield. However, he was able to continue playing with the implementation of the designated hitter in the National League.

==== May ====
The Phillies started off May slow and were swept in a two-game series by the Texas Rangers. On May 5, they suffered their worst loss of the year by blowing a 7–1 lead in the ninth inning in a loss against the Mets. On May 9, with a record of 12–16, the Phillies traveled to the West Coast for series with the Seattle Mariners and Los Angeles Dodgers. The Phillies went on to win 5 out of the 7 games they played there. On May 22, the Phillies played the Dodgers, this time at Citizens Bank Park, and won 4–3 on a walkoff error by second baseman Max Muncy. Roman Quinn, who was on second base, was able to score the winning run. On May 31, second baseman Jean Segura broke a finger after getting hit on a bunt attempt. Overall, the Phillies struggled during the home stretch in Philadelphia and by the end of May had a record of 21–29.

==== June ====
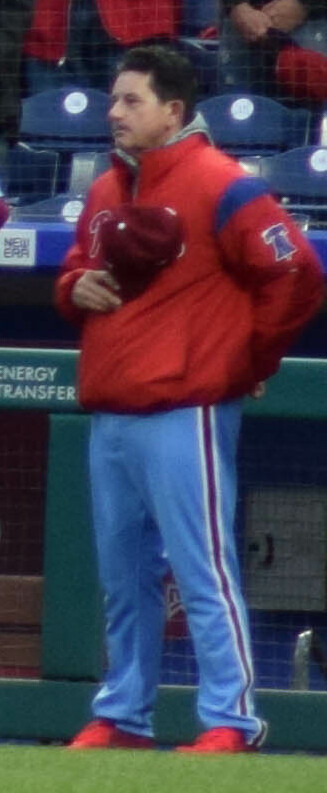
The Phillies named Rob Thomson the team's interim manager on June 1 and the team was instant success under his reign.

On June 1, the Phillies were 8 games under .500 and 12.5 games behind the first place New York Mets. As a result, the Phillies fired manager Joe Girardi and Rob Thomson was named the interim manager. President of Baseball Operations Dave Dombrowski said: "I still think it is early enough in the year that we can come back and we have a chance to make the postseason. I know the division is a ways off, but even if you win a Wild Card spot anything can take place. And I think from my perspective, a different voice was needed in the clubhouse at this time."

The Phillies started the Rob Thomson era off with a bang. On June 3, Thomson's first game, the Phillies defeated the Los Angeles Angels by a score of 10–0 and rookie Bryson Stott hit his first career home run. In the series finale against the Angels, on June 5, the Phillies were down 6–2 in the 8th inning, but Bryce Harper tied the game up at 6 runs each with a grand slam. Down by one run in the ninth inning, Stott hit a walkoff home run to win the game. The Phillies went on to win nine straight games as part of 14 wins in Thomson's first 16 games. As manager, Thomson began playing younger players including Bohm and Stott more.

On June 7, the Phillies entered the top of the ninth inning trailing the Milwaukee Brewers by a score of 2–1. However, Bohm and Matt Vierling, hit solo home runs against Josh Hader and the Phillies went on to win by a score of 3–2. This was the first blown save by Hader since June 2021. The Phillies defeated the Arizona Diamondbacks by a score of 4–0 on June 11, which resulted in the Phillies record standing at 31–30 for their first winning record since April 11. On June 15, Garrett Stubbs hit a walkoff three run home run in the ninth inning to give the Phillies a 3–1 win over the Miami Marlins. In June, the Phillies won five out of the seven series they played in. Despite the team's success in the month, Harper broke his thumb on June 25, which resulted in him missing two months of play. Following Harper's injury, the Phillies called up left handed power hitter Darick Hall from AAA to play designated hitter.

==== July ====
On July 5, the Phillies achieved a record of 43–38, with a win over the Washington Nationals which put them into the third wild card position. Entering the All Star Break, the Phillies had a record of 49–43. The team had two All-Stars: Bryce Harper and Kyle Schwarber. Harper was named the National League's starting designated hitter, but missed the game due to injury.

The Phillies began the second stretch of the season with a hiccup as they were swept in a three game series by the Chicago Cubs. However, they got back on track with a four game sweep of the Pittsburgh Pirates.

At the trade deadline, the Phillies acquired starting pitcher Noah Syndergaard, relief pitcher David Robertson, utility player Edmundo Sosa and centerfielder Brandon Marsh. To make room for the acquisitions, the Phillies released struggling veteran players including relief pitcher Jeurys Familia, centerfielder Odubel Herrera and shortstop Didi Gregorius. By releasing Gregorius, the Phillies gave the starting shortstop job solely to Stott.

==== August ====
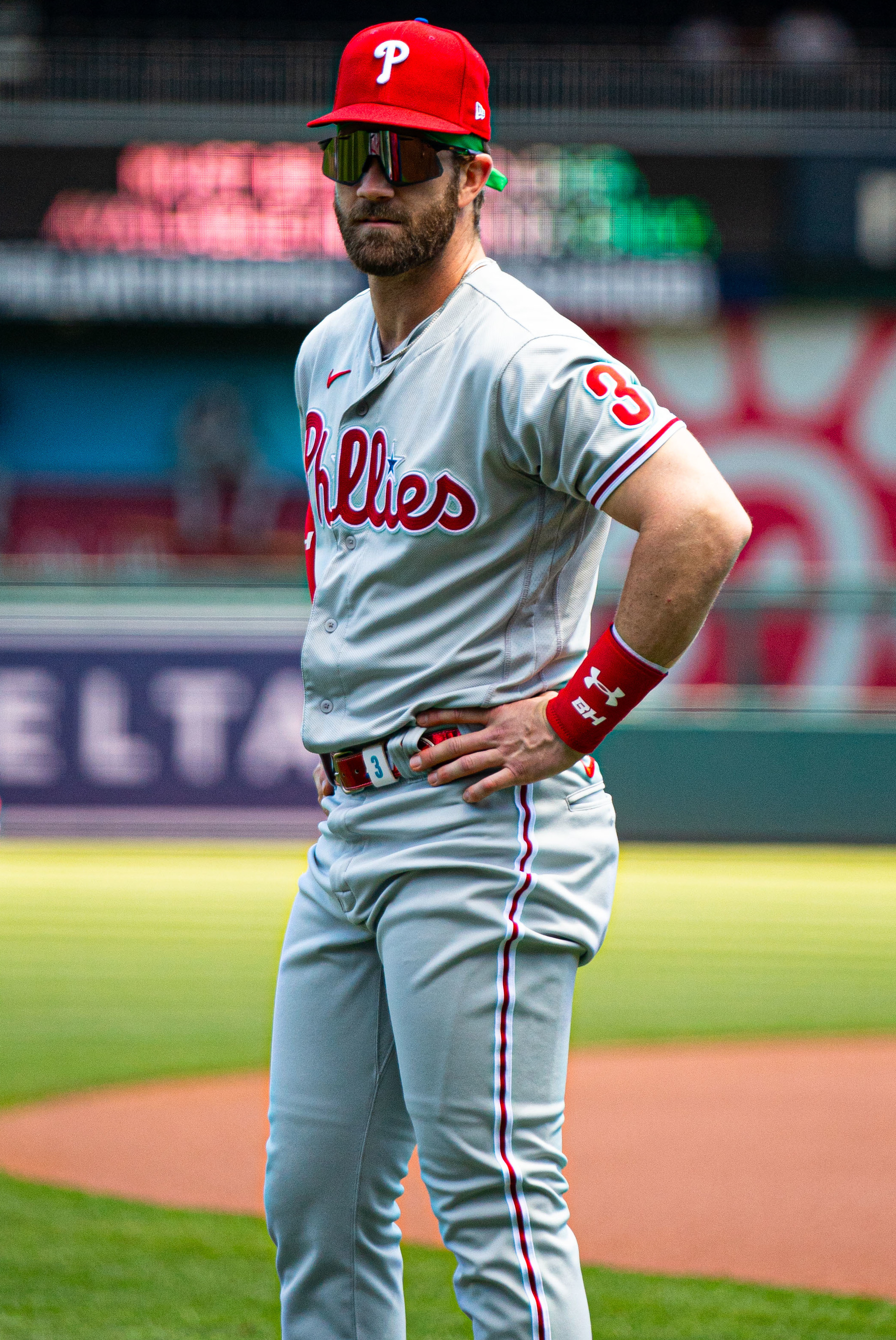
Designated hitter Bryce Harper returned from a broken thumb in August. In his first at-bat back, he hit a two-run single.

On August 25, the Phillies placed their ace pitcher Zack Wheeler on the injured list with forearm tendinitis. The team's other pitchers stepped up during his absence. For example, Aaron Nola, on August 25, threw a complete game shutout against the Cincinnati Reds in a 4–0 Phillies win.

Harper made his long awaited return on August 26 in a game against the Pittsburgh Pirates. In his first at-bat, Harper stepped into the batter's box with the bases loaded. He hit a two-run single. On August 27, the Phillies defeated the Pirates by a score of 6–0 to reach a season record of 72–55, a then-season-high 17 games over .500. The Phillies closed out August with an 18–2 win over the Arizona Diamondbacks.

==== September ====
The Phillies entered September with a record of 73–58 and looking to secure their first playoff appearance in 11 seasons. On September 6, Jean Segura hit a walkoff single against the Miami Marlins to give the Phillies a 3–2 win.

Being 18 games above .500 at one point, Phillies seemed destined to cruise to clinch a playoff berth in September. However, down the stretch they struggled significantly. In a September series against the Atlanta Braves they were swept. Having lost five straight games, the Phillies, led by the efforts of centerfielder Matt Vierling, completed a come from behind win against the Toronto Blue Jays, on September 21, to remain in the playoff hunt. However, in the second to last week of the season, they were swept by the Chicago Cubs and remained just 0.5 games above the Milwaukee Brewers for the third wildcard spot.

==== October ====
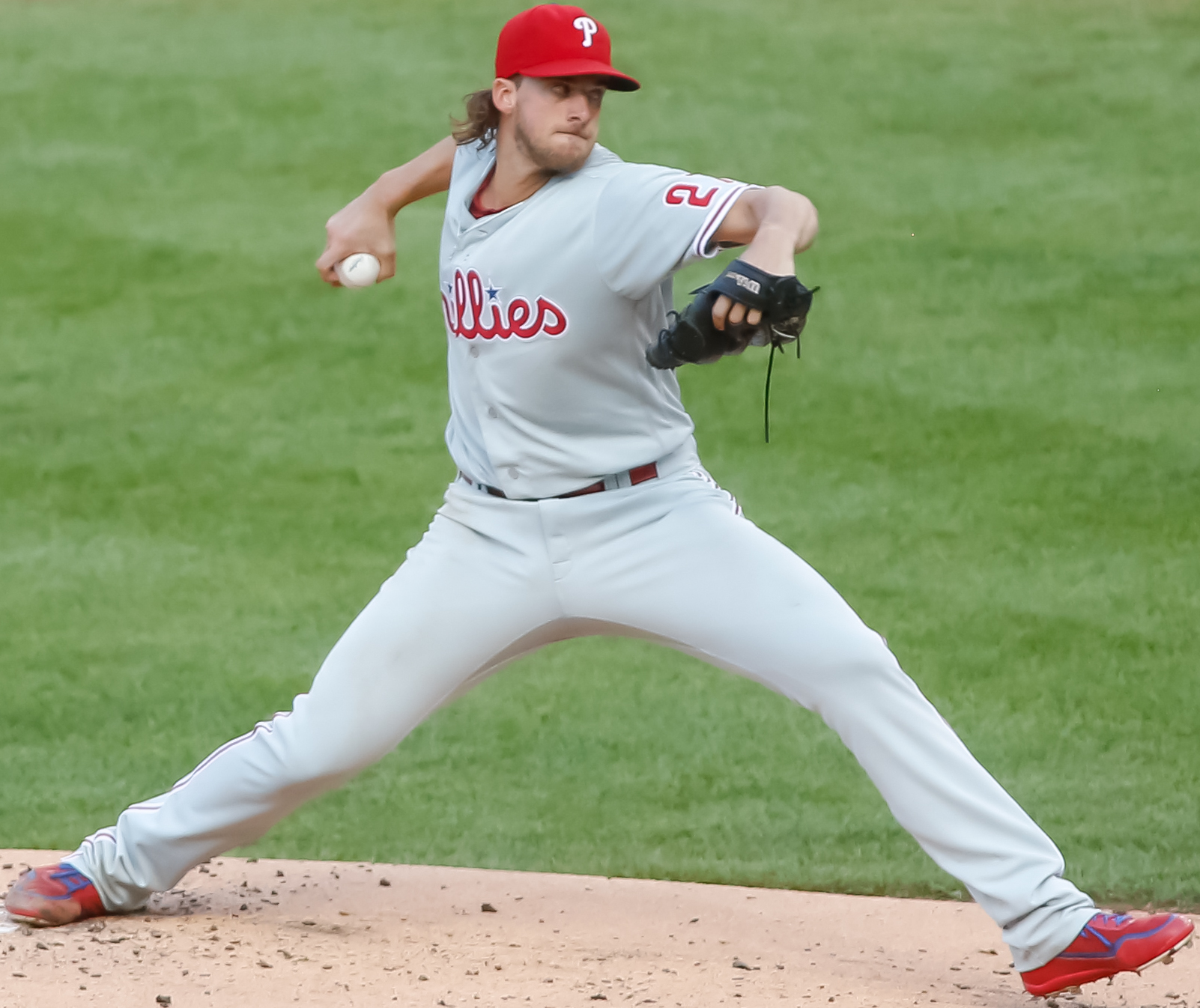
On October 3rd, the Phillies clinched their first postseason berth since 2011. In the clincher, starting pitcher Aaron Nola threw 6 2/3 perfect innings.

Entering October, the Phillies needed just three wins to secure a postseason berth. With two wins over the Washington Nationals, the Phillies were a win away from a spot in the playoffs. Their remaining schedule was a three game series against the Houston Astros. On October 3, the Phillies sent Aaron Nola to the mound looking to clinch a playoff berth. Nola had one of the best performances of his career throwing a perfect game over six 2/3 innings. Kyle Schwarber hit two home runs (including a first pitch leadoff home run) and Bryson Stott also hit a home run. Up 3–0, the Phillies sent longtime Phillie Zach Eflin to the mound to close the game out, which he did. The Phillies defeated the Astros 3–0 to clinch their first playoff berth since 2011.

== Postseason ==
=== Postseason game log ===
2022 Postseason Game Log: 11–6 (Home: 6–2; Away: 5–4)
NL Wild Card Series: 2–0 (Home: 0–0; Away: 2–0)

| # | Date | Opponent | Score | Win | Loss | Save | Attendance | Record |
|---|---|---|---|---|---|---|---|---|
| 1 | October 7 | @ Cardinals | 6–3 | David Robertson (1–0) | Ryan Helsley (0–1) | — | 45,911 | 1–0 |
| 2 | October 8 | @ Cardinals | 2–0 | Aaron Nola (1–0) | Miles Mikolas (0–1) | Zach Eflin (1) | 48,515 | 2–0 |

NL Division Series: 3–1 (Home: 2–0; Away: 1–1)

| # | Date | Opponent | Score | Win | Loss | Save | Attendance | Record |
|---|---|---|---|---|---|---|---|---|
| 1 | October 11 | @ Braves | 7–6 | Seranthony Domínguez (1–0) | Max Fried (0–1) | — | 42,641 | 1–0 |
| 2 | October 12 | @ Braves | 0–3 | Kyle Wright (1–0) | Zack Wheeler (0–1) | Kenley Jansen (1) | 42,735 | 1–1 |
| 3 | October 14 | Braves | 9–1 | Aaron Nola (2–0) | Spencer Strider (0–1) | — | 45,538 | 2–1 |
| 4 | October 15 | Braves | 8–3 | Brad Hand (1–0) | Charlie Morton (0–1) | — | 45,660 | 3–1 |

NL Championship Series: 4–1 (Home: 3–0; Away: 1–1)

| # | Date | Opponent | Score | Win | Loss | Save | Attendance | Record |
|---|---|---|---|---|---|---|---|---|
| 1 | October 18 | @ Padres | 2–0 | Zack Wheeler (1–1) | Yu Darvish (2–1) | José Alvarado (1) | 44,826 | 1–0 |
| 2 | October 19 | @ Padres | 5–8 | Blake Snell (2–0) | Aaron Nola (2–1) | Josh Hader (4) | 44,607 | 1–1 |
| 3 | October 21 | Padres | 4–2 | Ranger Suárez (1–0) | Joe Musgrove (1–1) | Seranthony Domínguez (1) | 45,279 | 2–1 |
| 4 | October 22 | Padres | 10–6 | Brad Hand (2–0) | Sean Manaea (0–1) | — | 45,467 | 3–1 |
| 5 | October 23 | Padres | 4–3 | José Alvarado (1–0) | Robert Suárez (0–1) | Ranger Suárez (1) | 45,485 | 4–1 |

World Series: 2–4 (Home: 1–2; Away: 1–2)

| # | Date | Opponent | Score | Win | Loss | Save | Attendance | Record |
|---|---|---|---|---|---|---|---|---|
| 1 | October 28 | @ Astros | 6–5 (10) | Seranthony Domínguez (2–0) | Luis García (1–1) | David Robertson (1) | 42,903 | 1–0 |
| 2 | October 29 | @ Astros | 2–5 | Framber Valdez (2–0) | Zack Wheeler (1–2) | — | 42,926 | 1–1 |
| — | October 31 | Astros | Postponed (rain); Makeup: November 1 | | | | | |
| 3 | November 1 | Astros | 7–0 | Ranger Suárez (2–0) | Lance McCullers Jr. (0–1) | — | 45,712 | 2–1 |
| 4 | November 2 | Astros | 0–5 | Cristian Javier (2–0) | Aaron Nola (2–2) | — | 45,693 | 2–2 |
| 5 | November 3 | Astros | 2–3 | Justin Verlander (2–0) | Noah Syndergaard (0–1) | Ryan Pressly (5) | 45,693 | 2–3 |
| 6 | November 5 | @ Astros | 1–4 | Framber Valdez (3–0) | Zack Wheeler (1–3) | Ryan Pressly (6) | 42,958 | 2–4 |

=== National League Wild Card Series ===
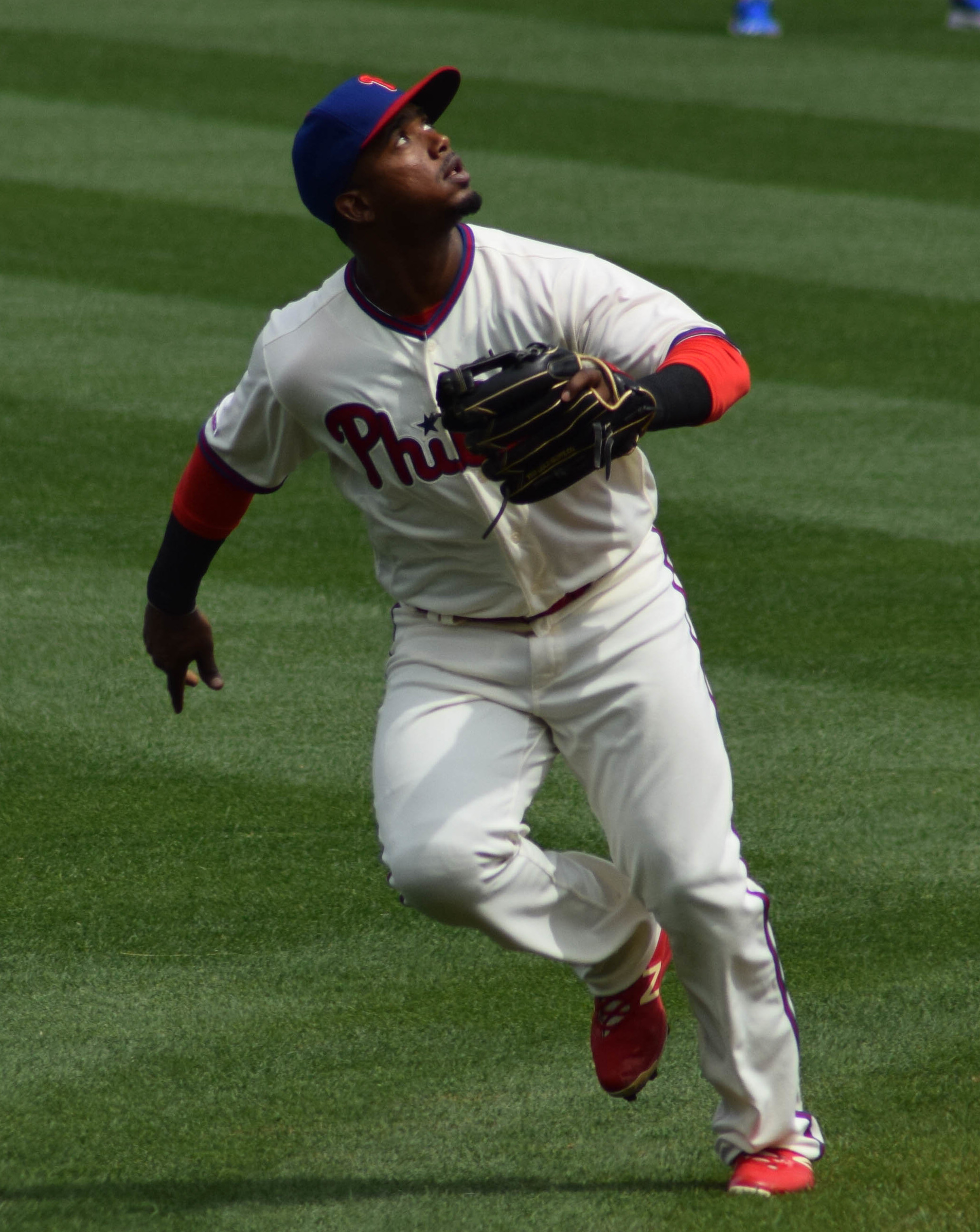
Jean Segura hit a go-ahead two RBI single in the top of the ninth inning in Game 1 of the National League Wild Card Series.

The Phillies traveled to Busch Stadium to face the St. Louis Cardinals in a best of three game series. The Cardinals were the #3 seed in the National League as a result of them winning the NL Central division. In Game 1, Zack Wheeler took the ball for the Phillies and pitched 6 2/3 scoreless innings. The game was scoreless until the seventh inning, when Juan Yepez hit a pinch-hit two-run home run off of Jose Alvarado, who had just relieved Wheeler. The score was still 2–0 in the top of the ninth when Cardinals closer Ryan Helsley, who had jammed fingers on his throwing hand in his previous appearance, allowed a single and two walks, then hit Alec Bohm with a 101-mph fastball, giving the Phillies their first run. With the bases still loaded, the next batter Jean Segura hit an opposite-field single to give the Phillies a 3–2 lead. The Phillies got three more runs in the inning off of singles by Bryson Stott and Brandon Marsh to make the score 6–2. The Cardinals scored a run in their half of the ninth, but Zach Eflin struck out the game-tying run in Yadier Molina to give the Phillies their first postseason victory in 11 years. Before the game, the St. Louis Cardinals had been 93–0 when leading a postseason game by two or more runs in the ninth inning.

In Game 2, longtime Phillies Aaron Nola started his first postseason game. Nola was electric in the outing throwing 6 2/3 scoreless innings. The bullpen was lights out with Seranthony Dominguez striking out Nolan Arenado and Paul Goldschmidt with two runners on in the 8th inning. The Phillies scored two runs via a Bryce Harper solo home run in the second inning and a Kyle Schwarber sacrifice fly in the fifth and it was all the runs they needed. With the win, the Phillies won their first postseason series since the 2010 National League Division Series and advanced to play the Braves in the National League Division Series.

=== National League Division Series ===
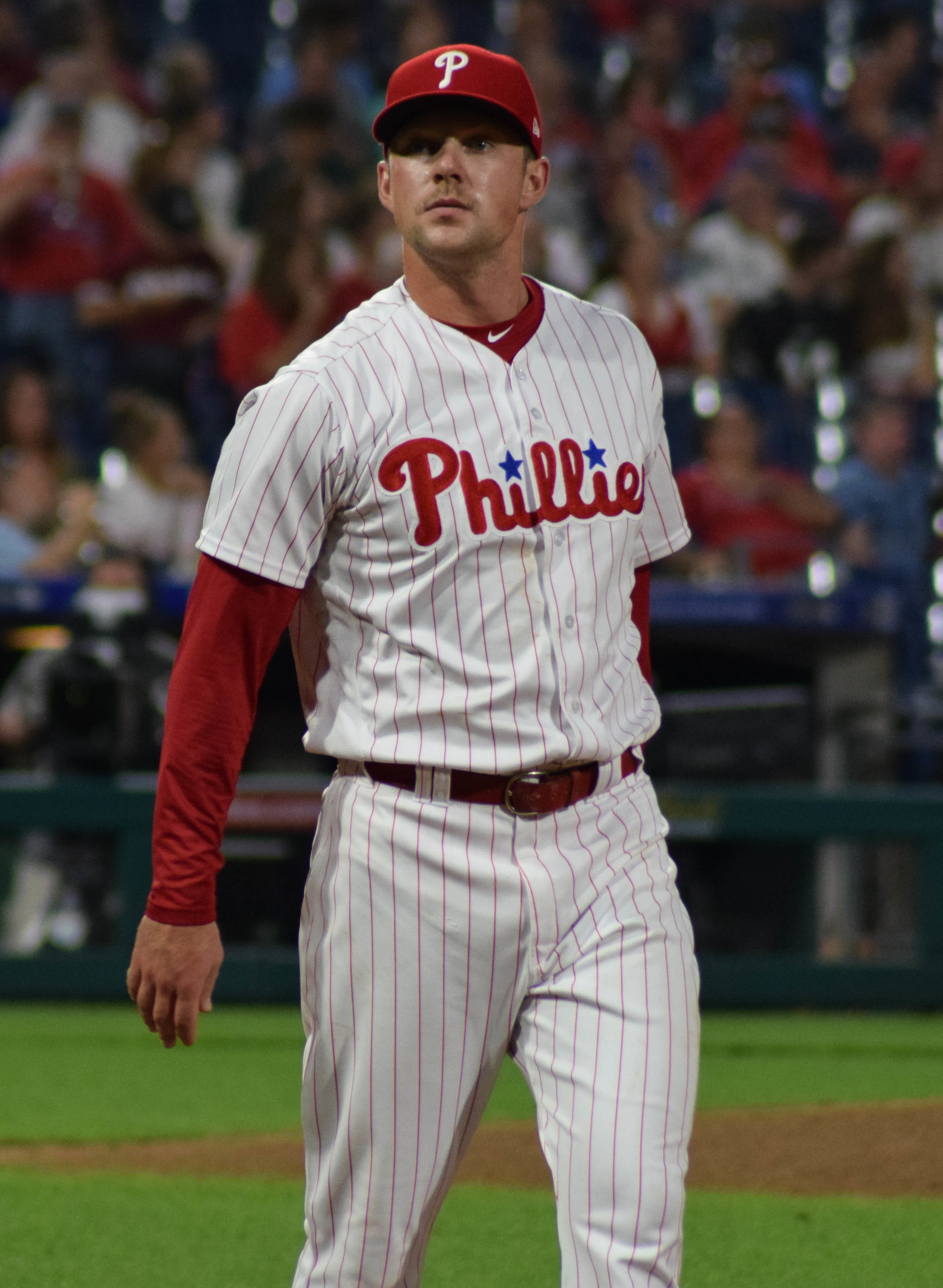
In Game 3 of the National League Division Series, first baseman Rhys Hoskins gave the Phillies a 3–0 lead on a home run to left field.

The Phillies faced their division rival and the defending World Series champion Atlanta Braves in the National League Division Series, a best of five game series. In Game 1, the Phillies sent Ranger Suarez to the mound to pitch in his first ever postseason game. On offense, the Phillies hammered Braves ace Max Fried early. Nick Castellanos put the Phillies up 1–0 with an RBI single in the first inning. The same inning, Alec Bohm, batting after Castellanos, added an RBI single to put the Phillies up 2–0. In the top of the 4th inning, Castellanos put the Phillies up 6–1 with a two RBI single. Up 7–3 in the bottom of the ninth inning, Matt Olson hit a three run home run to cut the Braves' deficit to just one run. The next batter William Contreras hit a ball that was bound to be an extra base hit, but Castellanos, playing right field, made a spectacular catch to record the second out of the inning. Zach Eflin got Travis d'Arnaud to groundout and the Phillies won Game 1 by a score of 7–6.

The Braves won Game 2 by a score of 3–0. Despite a good outing from Zack Wheeler, the Phillies were unable to put up any runs on Braves pitcher Kyle Wright.

The Phillies returned home for Game 3 of the National League Division Series. It was the first postseason game held at Citizens Bank Park since Game 5 of the National League Division Series in 2011. The Phillies sent Aaron Nola to the mound and he was dominant pitching six innings without giving up an earned run. Offensively, the Phillies were quiet until the third inning when Brandon Marsh, who got to first base on a walk, advanced to third base on a throwing error by Brave's pitcher Spencer Strider. After a nine pitch at-bat, Bryson Stott delivered for the Phillies hitting a double to score Marsh. The Braves then intentionally walked a struggling Kyle Schwarber to face the equally struggling Rhys Hoskins, who was at the time 1 for 19 in the postseason. However, Hoskins made the Braves pay and crushed a first pitch fastball for a 3-run home run into the left field seats. In a signature moment, Hoskins threw his hands in the air and then spiked his bat into the ground in celebration. J. T. Realmuto hit a single, which chased Strider from the game. With Realmuto on first, the Braves brought in left handed pitcher Dylan Lee to face Bryce Harper. The first pitch Harper saw was crushed into the stands in right center field to give the Phillies a 6–0 lead. The Phillies dominance over the Braves continued in the 7th inning where Harper hit an RBI double and Castellanos hit a two run RBI single to make it a 9–1 Phillies lead. That score would hold for the remainder of the game and the Phillies closed out Game 3 to take a 2–1 series lead heading into Game 4.

Game 4 was more total dominance from the Phillies. Marsh started the action early for the Phillies with a three run home run off of Charlie Morton. The next inning, J. T. Realmuto got into the action hitting a ball to left-center field that centerfield Michael Harris II was unable to catch. The ball ricocheted into centerfield and Realmuto was able to score an inside-the-park home run. Realmuto became the first catcher in Major League Baseball history to hit an inside-the-park home run in the postseason, giving the Phillies a 4–1 lead. In the bottom of the eighth inning, Harper hit a solo shot off of Kenley Jansen to give the Phillies an 8–3 lead. Seranthony Dominguez struck out the Braves in order and the Phillies won the National League Division Series three games to one over the Braves.

=== National League Championship Series ===
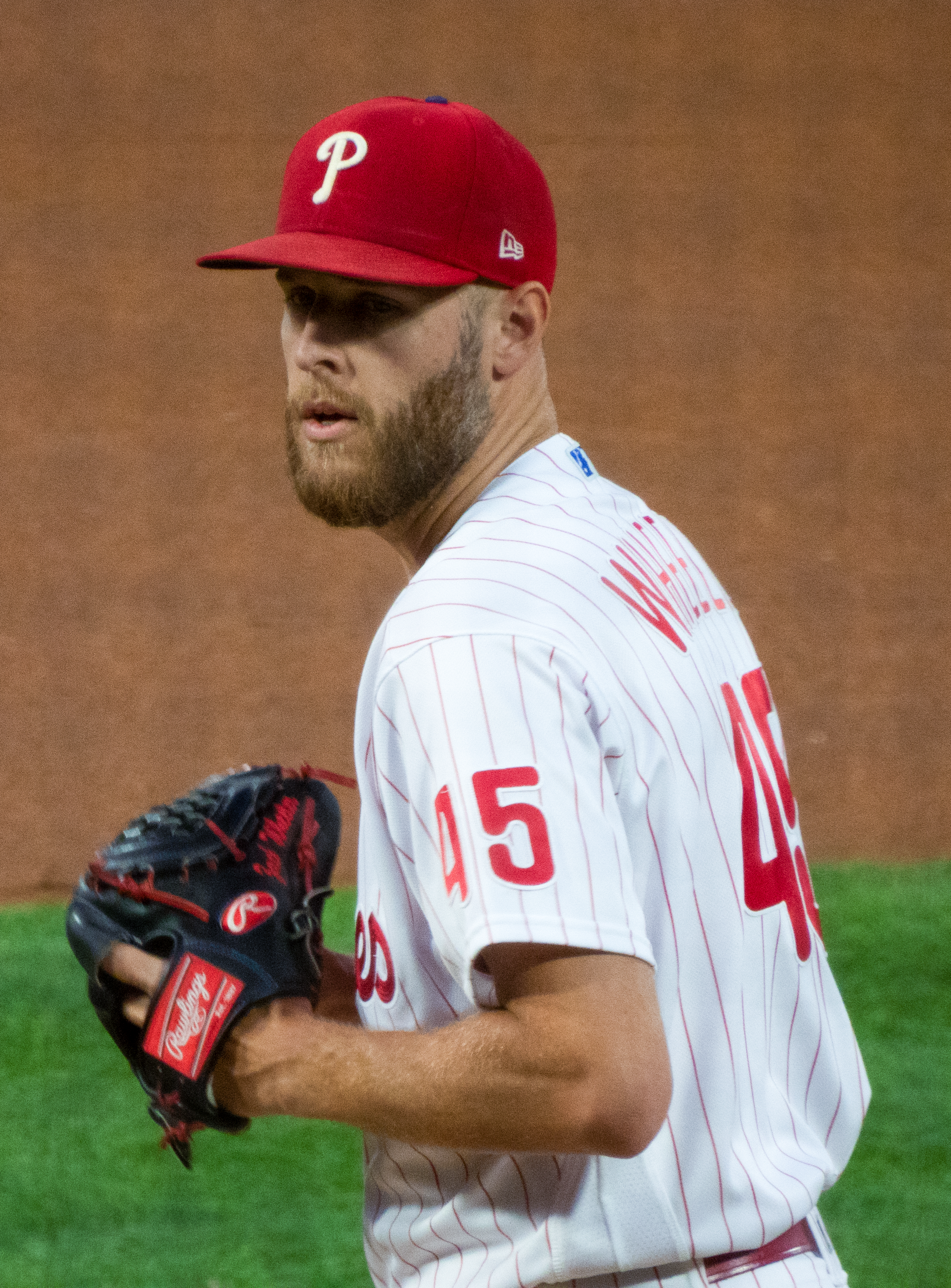
Zack Wheeler was dominant against the Padres giving up just two runs and four hits over 13 innings.

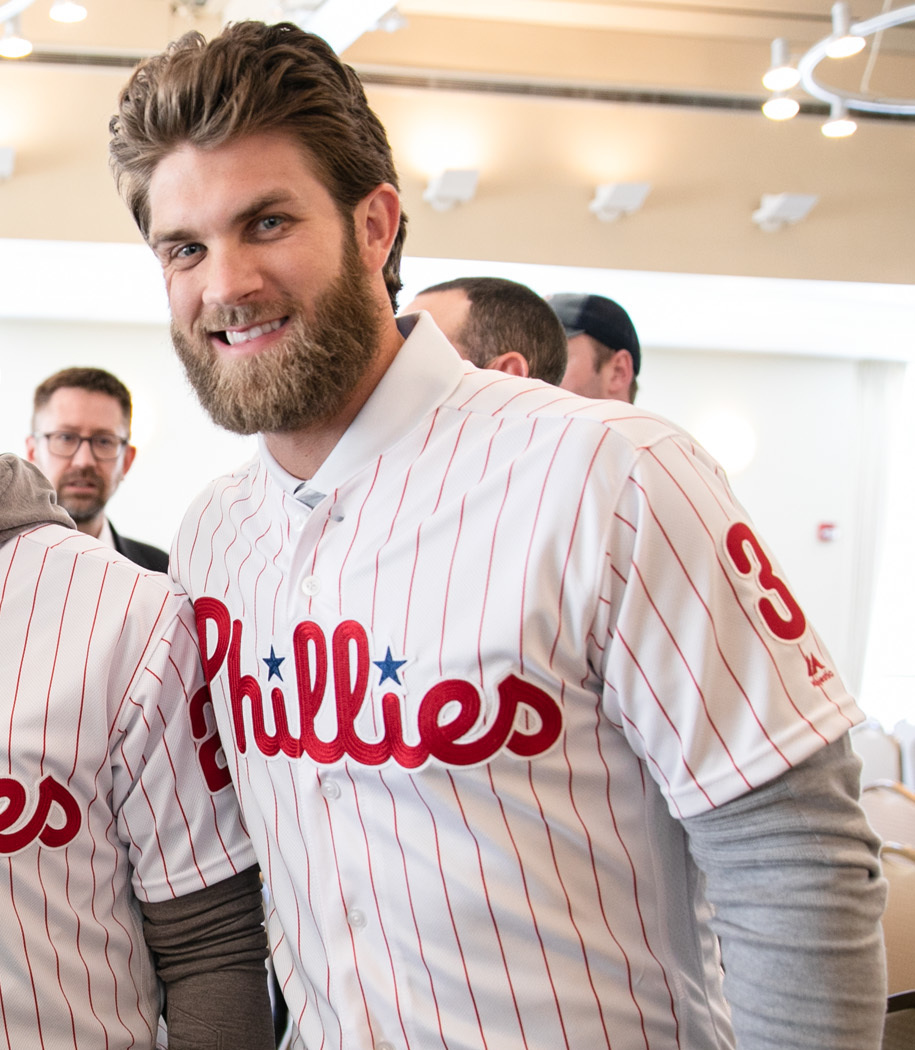
In the bottom of the eighth inning of Game 5, Bryce Harper hit what ended up being the game winning home run for the Phillies. The home run, which sent the Phillies to the World Series, has gone down as one of the greatest moments in Phillie's history.

The Phillies faced the San Diego Padres, who also reached the playoffs via a Wild Card berth, in the 2022 National League Championship Series. Game 1 was a classic pitcher's duel between Zack Wheeler and the Padre's Yu Darvish. In the top of the first, with Schwarber on third and two outs, Jake Cronenworth made a diving stop to get Bryce Harper out at first and rob the Phillies of a run. In the fourth inning, the Phillies struck first with Harper hitting a home run off of Darvish to left field to give the Phillies a 1–0 lead. In the top of the sixth inning, Schwarber added on to the Phillies' lead, hitting a towering second-deck home run. The home run, which traveled 488 feet, was the longest of Schwarber's career. Wheeler was brilliant for the Phillies. He struck out eight batters and gave up just one hit and no earned runs in a seven inning outing. The Phillies Seranthony Dominguez retired the side in the bottom of the eighth. In the ninth inning, a potential game-ending double play was spoiled when Bryson Stott missed a throw by third baseman Alec Bohm off of a Juan Soto grounder. However, after a Manny Machado flyout, Alvarado struck out Josh Bell to end the inning and the game.

The Phillies took an early 4–0 lead on the Padres in Game 2. They scored four runs off of Blake Snell in the top of the second by way of a bloop single by Bohm that scored Harper, a Matt Vierling double that was lost in the sun by Juan Soto, an Edmundo Sosa single, and a Schwarber grounder that was dropped by Brandon Drury, allowing Vierling to score. However, the Padres struck back hitting back-to-back home runs off of Aaron Nola. In the bottom of the fifth, Austin Nola singled off his brother, scoring Ha-seong Kim to cut the Phillies lead to one run. Jurickson Profar then singled to advance Nola to third. The next batter, Juan Soto, doubled to right field, scoring Nola and tying the game at four. Three additional runs would score in the inning, two from a single from Drury, and one from a single from Bell to put the Padres up 7–4. Josh Hader earned the save as the Padres won by a score of 8–5 to even the series.

Heading back to Philadelphia for Game 3, the Phillies sent Ranger Suarez to the mound. The Phillies offense struck first with Kyle Schwarber hitting a leadoff home run off of Joe Musgrove. In the top of the fourth, with runners at first and third, San Diego's Cronenworth hit a ground ball to shortstop Bryson Stott. Stott threw to second baseman Jean Segura, who dropped the ball, allowing Soto to score and tie the game at one run a piece. However, in the bottom of the fourth inning, Segura redeemed himself with a two out base hit to right field scoring Bohm and Stott to give the Phillies a 3–1 lead over the Padres. In the bottom of the sixth inning, with the Phillies leading by a run, Bohm hit a double to right field scoring Nick Castellanos to pad the Phillie's lead. Dominguez closed the game out for the Phillies to give them a 2–1 series lead.

In Game 4, the Phillies opted to start left-handed pitcher Bailey Falter to counter the Padre's Mike Clevinger. Falter struggled and was unable to get out of the first inning as he gave up four runs. However, in the bottom of the first inning, the Phillies responded with Rhys Hoskins hitting a two-run home run and Harper hitting an RBI double to cut the deficit to one run. In the bottom of the fourth, Stott hit an RBI single to score Castellanos and tie the game 4–4. The Padres regained the lead in the top of the fifth inning with Soto hitting a two run home run off of Brad Hand. Yet once again, it did not take the Phillies long to respond and Hoskins hit another two run home run, which tied the game. Two batters later, Harper hit an RBI double to give the Phillies the lead. The Phillies did not look back with Castellanos hitting an RBI single to score Harper. Later in the game, J. T. Realmuto and Schwarber hit solo home runs to move the Phillies one win from the World Series.

The Phillies faced Darvish again in Game 5. The Phillies countered with Wheeler. In the bottom of the third with two outs, Darvish walked Schwarber and the next batter, Hoskins, followed up on his performance in Game 4, and hit a two-run home run on a 3–0 pitch. Soto struck back for the Padres in the top of the fourth with a solo home run. Wheeler was chased from the game after giving up a single to Cronenworth in the top of the seventh. His replacement, Dominguez struggled to pitch in the rainy conditions. He gave up a double to Bell that scored Cronenworth to tie the game. José Azócar, who was pinch running for Bell, advanced to third on a wild pitch. With two outs and two strikes on the batter, Trent Grisham, Dominguez threw another pitch in the dirt to score Azócar and give San Diego the lead. Grisham then flew out to end the top of the inning. In the top of the seventh Stott doubled, removing Darvish from the game. He was replaced with Robert Suárez. After getting Jean Segura to fly out and striking out Brandon Marsh, the Padres intentionally walked Schwarber. With two outs, Hoskins flew out to end the inning. After Domínguez's disappointing performance in the seventh inning, he was replaced by Alvarado, who walked Soto after giving up a single to Jurickson Profar. Alvarado got out of the jam by getting Manny Machado to fly out and Cronenworth to ground out. In the bottom of the eighth inning, with the Phillies still trailing by a run, Realmuto singled to left field. With the tying run on base, Harper stepped into the batter's box. After a seven pitch at-bat, Harper lined a 96 mile-per-hour sinker into the left field seats to give the Phillies a 4-3 lead. Joe Davis, who was the TV play-by-play broadcaster, described the moment as the "swing of his life." Phillies radio play-by-play broadcaster, Scott Franzke described the moment as "bedlam at the bank." After Suárez retired the next two Phillies, David Robertson came in to close the series for the Phillies. However, after walking Drury and Kim with one out, he was taken out of the game. Ranger Suarez, who started in Game 3, was his replacement. Grisham, the next batter, bunted to advance the runners to second and third but was throw out at first base. Austin Nola then flew out to Castellanos, sending the Phillies to the World Series for the first time since 2009.

After the game, Harper was named the NLCS MVP, having had a .400 batting average, five runs batted in, and two home runs, including the pivotal two-run home run in Game 5.

=== World Series ===
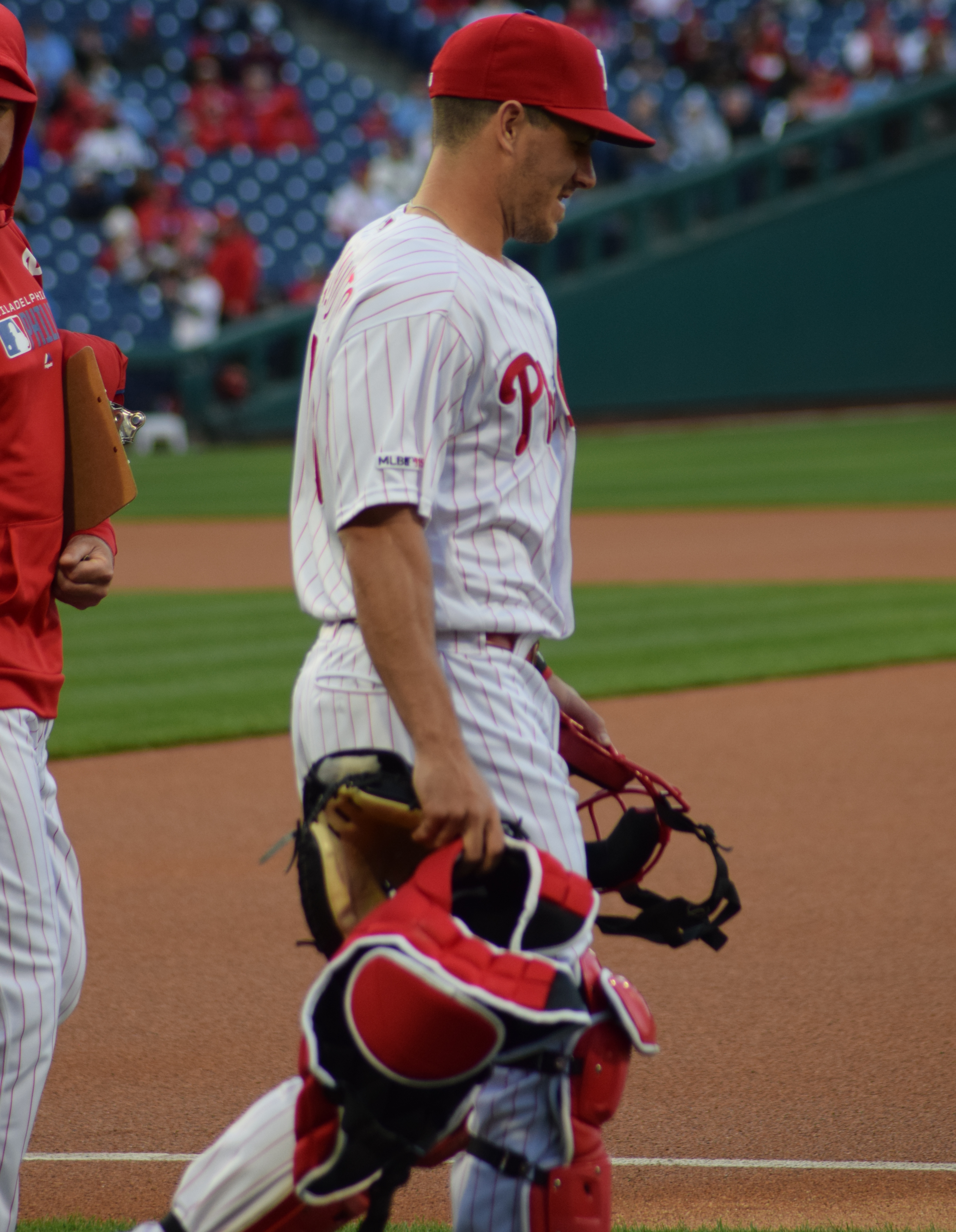
J. T. Realmuto hit a go-ahead home run in the top of the 10th inning to complete a comeback after trailing by five runs in Game 1 of the World Series.

In the World Series, the Phillies faced the Houston Astros, who were playing in their fourth World Series in six years. In Game 1 of the World Series, the Phillies started Aaron Nola while the Astros countered with Justin Verlander.

The Astros got out to an early start led by Kyle Tucker, who hit a solo home run off of Nola in the bottom of the second inning. Nola then gave up a three-run home run to Tucker, which gave Houston a 5–0 lead. Verlander took a no-hit bid into the top of the fourth inning when he gave up a single to Rhys Hoskins. Bryce Harper then singled moving Hoskins to third. Nick Castellanos drove in Hoskins with an RBI single, and Alec Bohm then drove in Harper and Castellanos with a double down the left-field line to trim the lead to two. In the top of the fifth inning, Verlander gave up a leadoff double to Brandon Marsh, and walked Kyle Schwarber. J. T. Realmuto hit a double off the base of the wall to score both runners and tie the game at five. The game remained tied through nine innings, and entered extra innings. With the game tied, Phillies manager Rob Thomson began managing aggressively using five relief pitchers over the next five innings. The move worked and the Phillies kept the Astros' offense scoreless. In the bottom of the ninth inning, with a runner on second base and two outs, Jeremy Peña hit a blooper to right field, which Castellanos caught on a slide to keep the Astros from winning. In the top of the tenth inning, Realmuto hit a solo home run off Luis García to give the Phillies a one-run lead. In the bottom of the tenth inning, David Robertson struck out Yordan Alvarez before giving up a double to Alex Bregman. With two runners on and two outs, pinch hitter Aledmys Díaz came to the plate. Robertson threw a wild pitch to advance the runners to second and third. After working the count to 2–1, Díaz was hit on the elbow by Robertson and started toward first base. However, the home plate umpire ruled that Díaz had leaned into the pitch, resulting in ball three. On the next pitch, Díaz grounded out, ending the game.

The Phillies started one of their aces, Zack Wheeler in Game 2. Wheeler struggled with his velocity throughout the game. In the first inning, Peña hit an RBI double to score Jose Altuve for the first run. Alvarez followed with the third straight double to bring in the second run for the Astros. Alvarez scored the third run on a throwing error by Edmundo Sosa. In the bottom of the fifth inning, Alex Bregman hit a two-run home to left field to make the score 5–0. The Phillies struggled to hit Astro's pitcher Framber Valdez, who gave up just one run in 6 1/3 innings. Nick Castellanos scored the first run for the Phillies in the seventh inning to make it 5–1. Schwarber in the top of the eighth inning hit a foul ball, which was thought to have been a two-run home run which would have made the score 5–3. He ended up flying out deep to right, just missing a home run. In the top of the ninth inning, Bohm scored on an error by Astro's first baseman Yuli Gurriel to make it 5–2, which proved to be the final score.

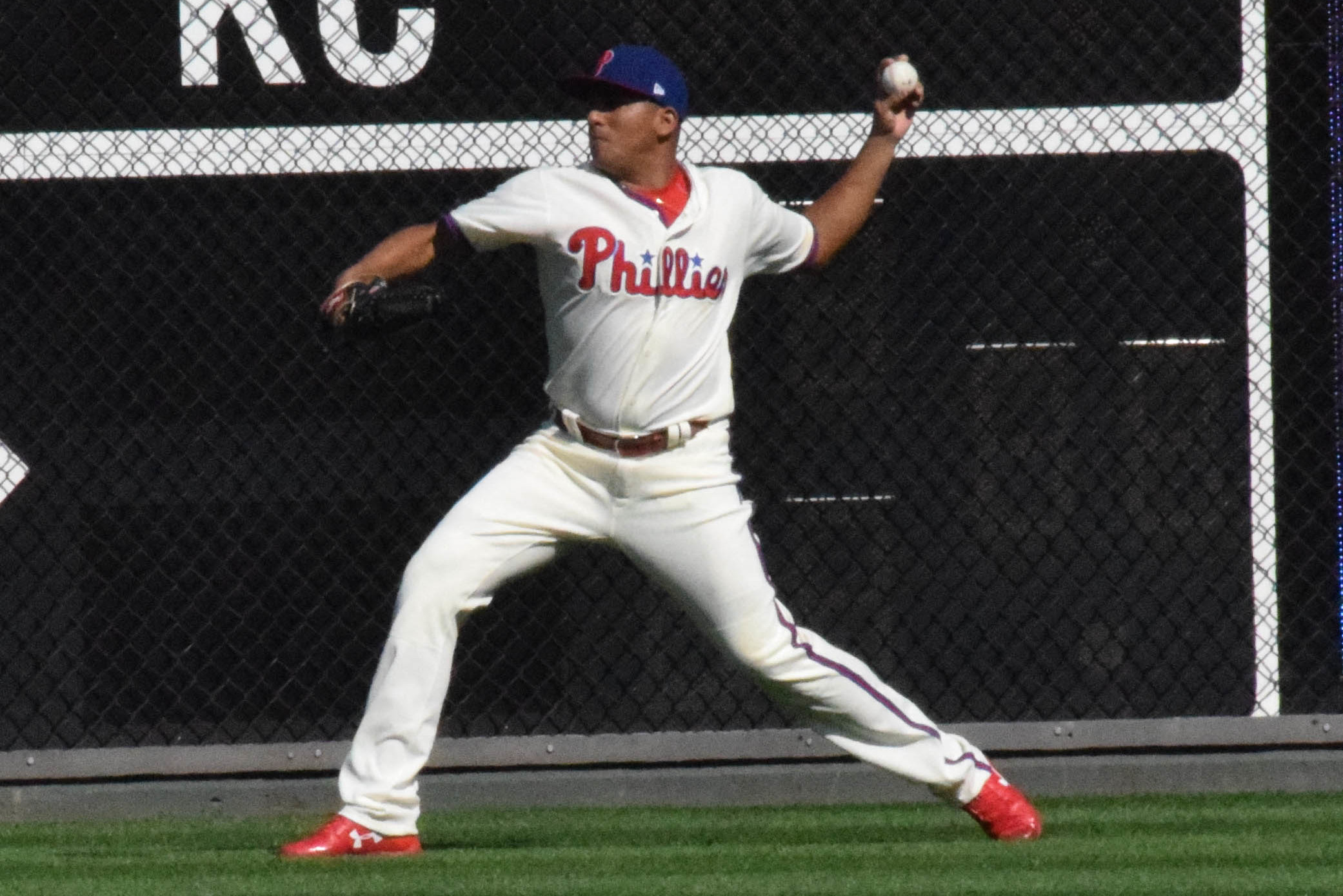
Ranger Suarez pitched five scoreless innings in Game 3 of the World Series.

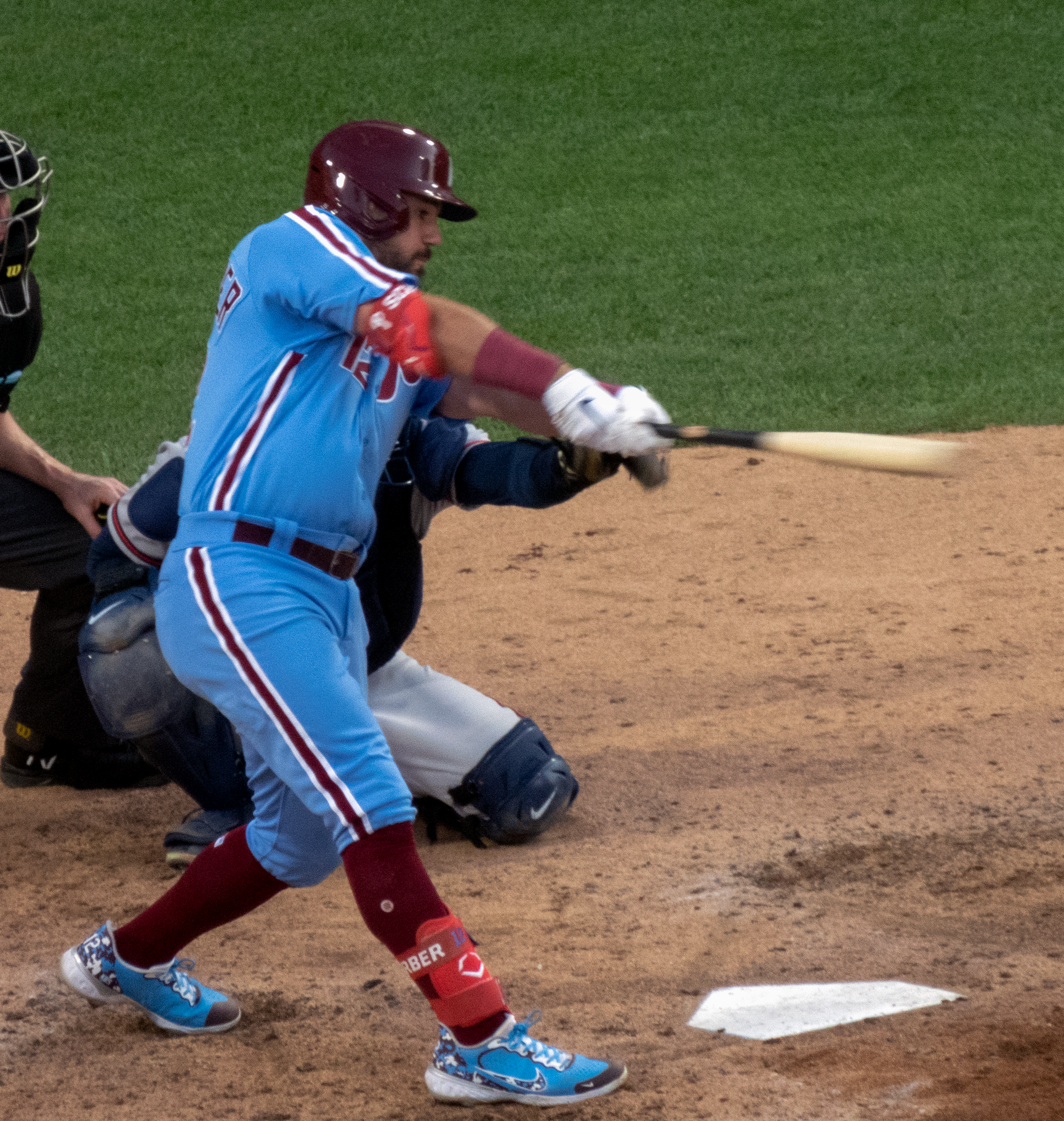
Kyle Schwarber hit one of five home runs for the Phillies in Game 3 of the World Series.

Game 3 brought the return of the World Series to Philadelphia for the first time since 2009. Originally scheduled for October 31, Game 3 was postponed to November 1 due to rain. Bernie Parent, Mike Schmidt, Julius Erving, and Brandon Graham, championship winning athletes for all four professional teams in Philadelphia, threw ceremonial first pitches. The game was pure dominance for the Phillies, who hit five home runs off Astros starting pitcher Lance McCullers Jr. The offensive action for the Phillies began in the first inning when Harper, batting with two outs, crushed the first pitch that he saw into the right field seats. Bohm and Marsh hit solo home runs for the Phillies in the second. Bohm's solo home run to left field in the second inning marked the 1,000th home run in World Series history. When Marsh also homered in that inning, the Phillies became the first team to hit three home runs in the first two innings of a World Series game. In the bottom of the fifth inning, Schwarber hit a two-run home run to dead center, and Hoskins, in the next at bat, hit a solo home run to left, making the Phillies the fourth team to hit five home runs in a World Series game, joining the 1928 Yankees, 1989 Athletics, and 2017 Astros, while McCullers became the first pitcher in history to surrender five home runs in a postseason game. Phillies starting pitcher Ranger Suarez threw five scoreless innings. Connor Brogdon, Kyle Gibson, Nick Nelson, and Andrew Bellatti each pitched a scoreless inning to complete the shutout as the Phillies won 7–0. All seven runs were scored via home runs.

Jimmy Rollins and Chase Utley threw the ceremonial first pitch before Game 4. Utley's pitch was caught by Rob McElhenney from It's Always Sunny in Philadelphia. Aaron Nola made his second start of the World Series for the Phillies, while the Astros countered with Cristian Javier. The Phillies were no-hit in the game by a combination of Javier, Bryan Abreu, Rafael Montero and Ryan Pressly. The Astros scored five runs and won Game 4 by a score of 5–0.

Before Game 5, rapper and Philadelphia native Meek Mill performed his song Dreams and Nightmares and rode with the Phillie Phanatic on his ATV. In a recreation of the final out of the 2008 World Series, Brad Lidge threw the ceremonial first pitch to Carlos Ruiz. The Phillies donned their powder blue throwback uniforms from the 1970s and 1980s, which they traditionally do on Thursday home games. The Phillies had ample opportunities in Game 5 of the World Series, but were unable to capitalize. Altuve led off the game with a double, advanced to third base on an error, and scored on a single by Jeremy Peña. Kyle Schwarber hit a lead off home run, off of Justin Verlander, to tie the game at 1–1. Peña hit a home run to put the Astros ahead at 2–1 in the fourth inning. The Phillies, who had put runners in scoring position throughout the next four innings, including the bases loaded, did not score another run off of Verlander, who finished his appearance with six strikeouts and four walks allowed in five innings. In the top of the eighth inning, Altuve scored from third base on a ground out by Yordan Alvarez, widening the Astros' lead to 3–1. In the bottom of the eighth inning, Castellanos scored on an RBI single by Jean Segura narrowing the Phillies' deficit and putting runners on the corners. Ryan Pressly entered to try for a five-out save, his fourth appearance in the series. He recorded a strikeout of Marsh and a hard-hit Schwarber groundout to Trey Mancini to end the eighth inning. In the ninth inning, Chas McCormick made a leaping catch at the right-center wall on a flyball hit by J. T. Realmuto for the second out, preventing a likely double or triple.

Game 6 saw the Phillies send Zack Wheeler to the mound again. The Astros countered with Framber Valdez. The game remained scoreless through five innings before Schwarber hit a solo home run to right field for the Phillies in the top of the sixth inning. Wheeler allowed Jose Altuve and Jeremy Peña to reach base and was relieved by Jose Alvarado in preparation for Yordan Alvarez. Alvarado then gave up a three-run home run to Alvarez. The Astros went on to win the game and the World Series by a score of 4–1.

Despite losing the World Series, the 2022 season was the Phillies most successful since 2009 when the Phillies last won the National League pennant. Kyle Schwarber said that the Phillies playoff run resulted in a team being "battle tested and ready to do it all again. The pieces are all in place. Young players, who have proven they belong; an incredible core of All-Star veterans; a manager, who knows how to get the best from us; a front office and ownership, who would do whatever it takes and the best home field advantage in baseball. I can't wait to do it all again."

=== Postseason rosters ===
Playoff rosters
National League Wild Card Series

- Pitchers: 27 Aaron Nola 30 David Robertson 43 Noah Syndergaard 44 Kyle Gibson 45 Zack Wheeler 46 José Alvarado 52 Brad Hand 55 Ranger Suárez 56 Zach Eflin 58 Seranthony Domínguez 64 Andrew Bellatti 70 Bailey Falter 75 Connor Brogdon
- Catchers: 10 J. T. Realmuto 21 Garrett Stubbs
- Infielders: 2 Jean Segura 5 Bryson Stott 17 Rhys Hoskins 28 Alec Bohm 29 Nick Maton 33 Edmundo Sosa
- Outfielders: 8 Nick Castellanos 12 Kyle Schwarber 16 Brandon Marsh 19 Matt Vierling
- Designated hitters: 3 Bryce Harper

National League Division Series

- Pitchers: 27 Aaron Nola 43 Noah Syndergaard 44 Kyle Gibson 45 Zack Wheeler 46 José Alvarado 52 Brad Hand 55 Ranger Suárez 56 Zach Eflin 57 Nick Nelson 58 Seranthony Domínguez 64 Andrew Bellatti 70 Bailey Falter 75 Connor Brogdon
- Catchers: 10 J. T. Realmuto 21 Garrett Stubbs
- Infielders: 2 Jean Segura 5 Bryson Stott 17 Rhys Hoskins 28 Alec Bohm 33 Edmundo Sosa
- Outfielders: 8 Nick Castellanos 12 Kyle Schwarber 16 Brandon Marsh 18 Dalton Guthrie 19 Matt Vierling
- Designated hitters: 3 Bryce Harper

National League Championship Series

- Pitchers: 27 Aaron Nola 30 David Robertson 43 Noah Syndergaard 44 Kyle Gibson 45 Zack Wheeler 46 José Alvarado 52 Brad Hand 55 Ranger Suárez 56 Zach Eflin 58 Seranthony Domínguez 64 Andrew Bellatti 70 Bailey Falter 75 Connor Brogdon
- Catchers: 10 J. T. Realmuto 21 Garrett Stubbs
- Infielders: 2 Jean Segura 5 Bryson Stott 17 Rhys Hoskins 28 Alec Bohm 33 Edmundo Sosa
- Outfielders: 8 Nick Castellanos 12 Kyle Schwarber 16 Brandon Marsh 18 Dalton Guthrie 19 Matt Vierling
- Designated hitters: 3 Bryce Harper

World Series

- Pitchers: 27 Aaron Nola 30 David Robertson 43 Noah Syndergaard 44 Kyle Gibson 45 Zack Wheeler 46 José Alvarado 52 Brad Hand 55 Ranger Suárez 56 Zach Eflin 57 Nick Nelson 58 Seranthony Domínguez 64 Andrew Bellatti 75 Connor Brogdon
- Catchers: 10 J. T. Realmuto 21 Garrett Stubbs
- Infielders: 2 Jean Segura 5 Bryson Stott 17 Rhys Hoskins 28 Alec Bohm 29 Nick Maton 33 Edmundo Sosa
- Outfielders: 8 Nick Castellanos 12 Kyle Schwarber 16 Brandon Marsh 19 Matt Vierling
- Designated hitters: 3 Bryce Harper

== Statistics ==
=== Batting ===
(Final Stats)
Players in bold are on the active roster.
Note: G = Games played; AB = At bats; R = Runs; H = Hits; 2B = Doubles; 3B = Triples; HR = Home runs; RBI = Runs batted in; SB = Stolen bases; BB = Walks; K = Strikeouts; AVG = Batting average; OBP = On-base percentage; SLG = Slugging percentage; TB = Total bases

| Player | G | AB | R | H | 2B | 3B | HR | RBI | SB | BB | K | AVG | OBP | SLG | TB |
|---|---|---|---|---|---|---|---|---|---|---|---|---|---|---|---|
| **José Alvarado** | 1 | 1 | 0 | 0 | 0 | 0 | 0 | 0 | 0 | 0 | 1 | .000 | .000 | .000 | 0 |
| **Alec Bohm** | 152 | 586 | 79 | 164 | 24 | 3 | 13 | 72 | 2 | 31 | 110 | .280 | .315 | .398 | 233 |
| Johan Camargo | 52 | 152 | 8 | 36 | 3 | 0 | 3 | 15 | 0 | 13 | 37 | .237 | .297 | .316 | 48 |
| **Nick Castellanos** | 136 | 524 | 56 | 138 | 27 | 0 | 13 | 62 | 7 | 29 | 130 | .263 | .305 | .389 | 204 |
| Didi Gregorius | 63 | 214 | 17 | 45 | 9 | 4 | 1 | 19 | 1 | 13 | 36 | .210 | .263 | .304 | 65 |
| Dalton Guthrie | 14 | 21 | 3 | 7 | 0 | 0 | 1 | 5 | 1 | 6 | 7 | .333 | .500 | .476 | 10 |
| **Darick Hall** | 41 | 136 | 19 | 34 | 8 | 1 | 9 | 16 | 0 | 5 | 44 | .250 | .282 | .522 | 71 |
| **Bryce Harper** | 99 | 370 | 63 | 106 | 28 | 1 | 18 | 65 | 11 | 46 | 87 | .286 | .364 | .514 | 190 |
| Odúbel Herrera | 62 | 185 | 23 | 44 | 9 | 1 | 5 | 21 | 6 | 11 | 42 | .238 | .279 | .378 | 70 |
| Rhys Hoskins | 156 | 589 | 81 | 145 | 33 | 2 | 30 | 79 | 2 | 72 | 169 | .246 | .332 | .462 | 272 |
| **Scott Kingery** | 1 | 0 | 0 | 0 | 0 | 0 | 0 | 0 | 0 | 0 | 0 | .--- | .--- | .--- | 0 |
| **Brandon Marsh** | 41 | 132 | 15 | 38 | 9 | 2 | 3 | 15 | 2 | 6 | 41 | .288 | .319 | .455 | 60 |
| Nick Maton | 34 | 72 | 13 | 18 | 2 | 1 | 5 | 17 | 0 | 10 | 29 | .250 | .341 | .514 | 37 |
| Oscar Mercado | 1 | 1 | 0 | 0 | 0 | 0 | 0 | 0 | 0 | 0 | 1 | .000 | .000 | .000 | 0 |
| Mickey Moniak * | 18 | 46 | 4 | 6 | 1 | 0 | 0 | 2 | 0 | 3 | 19 | .130 | .184 | .152 | 7 |
| Yairo Muñoz | 29 | 57 | 7 | 12 | 2 | 0 | 3 | 7 | 1 | 3 | 10 | .211 | .250 | .404 | 23 |
| **Simón Muzziotti** | 9 | 7 | 0 | 1 | 0 | 0 | 0 | 0 | 0 | 0 | 2 | .143 | .250 | .143 | 1 |
| Roman Quinn * | 23 | 37 | 8 | 6 | 1 | 0 | 0 | 3 | 4 | 3 | 15 | .162 | .225 | .189 | 7 |
| **J. T. Realmuto** | 139 | 504 | 75 | 139 | 26 | 5 | 22 | 84 | 21 | 41 | 119 | .276 | .342 | .478 | 241 |
| Donny Sands | 3 | 3 | 0 | 0 | 0 | 0 | 0 | 0 | 0 | 1 | 1 | .000 | .250 | .000 | 0 |
| **Kyle Schwarber** | 155 | 577 | 100 | 126 | 21 | 3 | 46 | 94 | 10 | 86 | 200 | .218 | .323 | .504 | 291 |
| Jean Segura | 98 | 354 | 45 | 98 | 9 | 0 | 10 | 33 | 13 | 25 | 58 | .277 | .336 | .387 | 137 |
| **Edmundo Sosa** | 25 | 54 | 9 | 17 | 7 | 1 | 2 | 13 | 3 | 1 | 12 | .315 | .345 | .593 | 32 |
| **Bryson Stott** | 127 | 427 | 58 | 100 | 19 | 2 | 10 | 49 | 12 | 36 | 89 | .234 | .295 | .358 | 153 |
| **Garrett Stubbs** | 46 | 106 | 19 | 28 | 4 | 1 | 5 | 16 | 2 | 14 | 30 | .264 | .350 | .462 | 49 |
| Matt Vierling | 117 | 325 | 41 | 80 | 12 | 2 | 6 | 32 | 7 | 23 | 70 | .246 | .297 | .351 | 114 |
| Bradley Zimmer | 9 | 16 | 4 | 4 | 1 | 0 | 0 | 0 | 0 | 0 | 4 | .250 | .250 | .313 | 5 |
| **TEAM TOTALS** | 162 | 5496 | 747 | 1392 | 255 | 29 | 205 | 719 | 105 | 478 | 1363 | .253 | .317 | .422 | 2320 |

=== Pitching ===
(Final stats)
Players in bold are on the active roster.
Note: W = Wins; L = Losses; ERA = Earned run average; WHIP = Walks plus hits per inning pitched; G = Games pitched; GS = Games started; SV = Saves; IP = Innings pitched; H = Hits allowed; R = Runs allowed; ER = Earned runs allowed; BB = Walks allowed; K = Strikeouts

| Player | W | L | ERA | WHIP | G | GS | SV | IP | H | R | ER | BB | K |
|---|---|---|---|---|---|---|---|---|---|---|---|---|---|
| **José Alvarado** | 4 | 2 | 3.18 | 1.22 | 59 | 0 | 2 | 51.0 | 38 | 21 | 18 | 24 | 81 |
| Mark Appel | 0 | 0 | 1.74 | 1.16 | 6 | 0 | 0 | 10.1 | 9 | 2 | 2 | 3 | 5 |
| Andrew Bellatti | 4 | 4 | 3.31 | 1.33 | 59 | 1 | 2 | 54.1 | 47 | 25 | 20 | 25 | 78 |
| Connor Brogdon | 2 | 2 | 3.27 | 1.25 | 47 | 0 | 2 | 44.0 | 44 | 16 | 16 | 11 | 50 |
| Sam Coonrod | 0 | 0 | 7.82 | 1.50 | 12 | 0 | 0 | 12.2 | 12 | 12 | 11 | 7 | 12 |
| Tyler Cyr | 0 | 0 | 27.00 | 6.00 | 1 | 0 | 0 | 0.1 | 2 | 1 | 1 | 0 | 0 |
| **Seranthony Domínguez** | 6 | 5 | 3.00 | 1.14 | 54 | 0 | 9 | 51.0 | 36 | 18 | 17 | 22 | 61 |
| Nick Duron | 0 | 0 | 0.00 | 2.00 | 1 | 0 | 0 | 1.0 | 2 | 0 | 0 | 0 | 1 |
| Zach Eflin | 3 | 5 | 4.04 | 1.12 | 20 | 13 | 1 | 75.2 | 70 | 38 | 34 | 15 | 65 |
| Bailey Falter | 6 | 4 | 3.86 | 1.21 | 20 | 16 | 0 | 84.0 | 85 | 39 | 36 | 17 | 74 |
| Jeurys Familia | 1 | 1 | 6.09 | 1.85 | 38 | 0 | 0 | 34.0 | 48 | 26 | 23 | 15 | 33 |
| Kyle Gibson | 10 | 8 | 5.05 | 1.34 | 31 | 31 | 0 | 167.2 | 176 | 98 | 94 | 48 | 144 |
| **Darick Hall** | 0 | 0 | 0.00 | 3.00 | 1 | 0 | 0 | 0.1 | 1 | 0 | 0 | 0 | 0 |
| Brad Hand | 3 | 2 | 2.80 | 1.33 | 55 | 0 | 5 | 45.0 | 37 | 18 | 14 | 23 | 38 |
| Damon Jones | 0 | 0 | 9.64 | 1.92 | 4 | 0 | 0 | 4.2 | 4 | 5 | 5 | 5 | 5 |
| Michael Kelly | 0 | 0 | 2.25 | 1.00 | 4 | 0 | 0 | 4.0 | 4 | 3 | 1 | 1 | 4 |
| Corey Knebel | 3 | 5 | 3.43 | 1.37 | 46 | 0 | 12 | 44.2 | 33 | 22 | 17 | 28 | 41 |
| Nick Maton | 0 | 0 | 20.25 | 3.00 | 2 | 0 | 0 | 1.1 | 4 | 3 | 3 | 0 | 0 |
| Francisco Morales | 0 | 0 | 7.20 | 1.60 | 3 | 0 | 1 | 5.0 | 2 | 5 | 4 | 6 | 3 |
| Vinny Nittoli | 0 | 0 | 0.00 | 0.50 | 2 | 0 | 0 | 2.0 | 0 | 0 | 0 | 1 | 1 |
| **Nick Nelson** | 3 | 2 | 4.85 | 1.49 | 47 | 2 | 1 | 68.2 | 66 | 38 | 37 | 36 | 69 |
| **Aaron Nola** | 11 | 13 | 3.25 | 0.96 | 32 | 32 | 0 | 205.0 | 168 | 75 | 74 | 29 | 235 |
| James Norwood | 1 | 0 | 8.31 | 1.90 | 20 | 0 | 0 | 17.1 | 24 | 17 | 16 | 9 | 22 |
| Michael Plassmeyer | 0 | 1 | 3.68 | 1.36 | 2 | 0 | 0 | 7.1 | 9 | 3 | 3 | 1 | 7 |
| David Robertson | 1 | 3 | 2.70 | 1.37 | 22 | 0 | 6 | 23.1 | 16 | 8 | 7 | 16 | 30 |
| JoJo Romero | 0 | 0 | 13.50 | 2.50 | 2 | 0 | 0 | 2.0 | 4 | 3 | 3 | 1 | 1 |
| Bubby Rossman | 0 | 0 | 18.00 | 2.00 | 1 | 0 | 0 | 1.0 | 1 | 2 | 2 | 1 | 1 |
| **Cristopher Sánchez** | 2 | 2 | 5.62 | 1.38 | 15 | 3 | 1 | 40.0 | 40 | 38 | 25 | 17 | 35 |
| **Garrett Stubbs** | 0 | 0 | 17.18 | 2.18 | 4 | 0 | 0 | 3.2 | 7 | 7 | 7 | 1 | 1 |
| **Ranger Suárez** | 10 | 7 | 3.65 | 1.33 | 29 | 29 | 0 | 155.1 | 149 | 74 | 63 | 58 | 129 |
| Noah Syndergaard | 5 | 2 | 4.12 | 1.32 | 10 | 9 | 0 | 54.2 | 63 | 26 | 25 | 9 | 31 |
| **Zack Wheeler** | 12 | 7 | 2.82 | 1.04 | 26 | 26 | 0 | 153.0 | 125 | 52 | 48 | 34 | 163 |
| **TEAM TOTALS** | 87 | 75 | 3.97 | 1.26 | 162 | 162 | 42 | 1428.1 | 1330 | 685 | 630 | 463 | 1423 |

== Farm system ==
| Level | Team | League | Manager |
|---|---|---|---|
| AAA | Lehigh Valley IronPigs | International League | Anthony Contreras |
| AA | Reading Fightin Phils | Eastern League | Shawn Williams |
| High A | Jersey Shore BlueClaws | South Atlantic League | Keith Werman |
| Low-A | Clearwater Threshers | Florida State League | Marty Malloy |
| Rookie | FCL Phillies | Florida Complex League | Roly de Armas |
| Rookie | DSL Phillies Red | Dominican Summer League | Manny Amador |
| Rookie | DSL Phillies White | Dominican Summer League | Manny Amador |
