= Darick Hall =

American baseball player (born 1995)

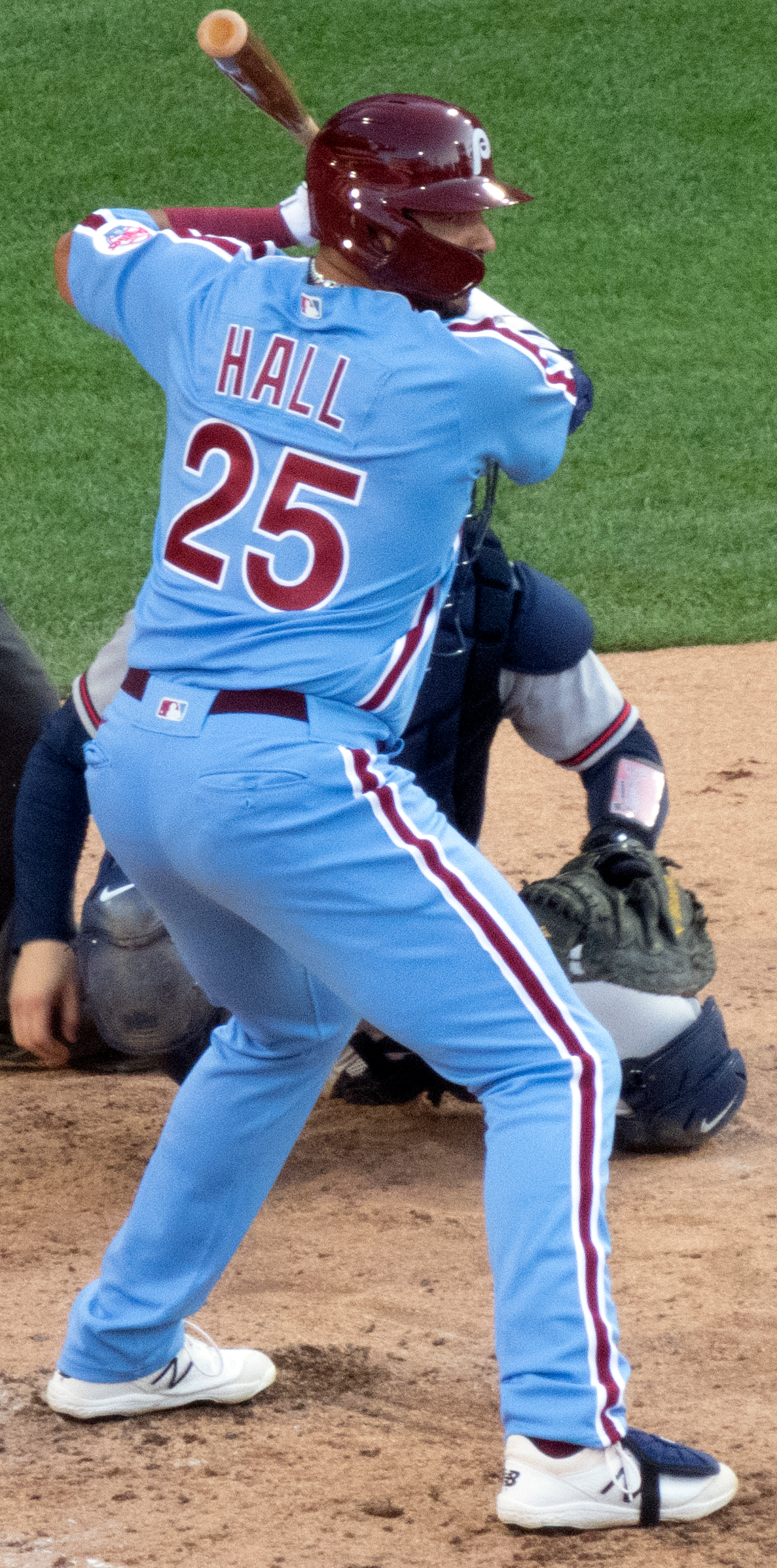
- Hall batting for Philadelphia Phillies in 2022

Hagerstown Flying Boxcars – No. 22
- First baseman / Designated Hitter
- Born: July 25, 1995 (age 31); Hereford, Arizona, U.S.
- Bats: Left Throws: Right

MLB debut
- June 29, 2022, for the Philadelphia Phillies

MLB statistics (through 2023 season)
- Batting average: .226
- Home runs: 10
- Runs batted in: 19
- Stats at Baseball Reference

Teams
- Philadelphia Phillies (2022–2023)

Darick Hall (born July 25, 1995) is an American professional baseball first baseman and designated hitter for the Hagerstown Flying Boxcars of the Atlantic League of Professional Baseball. He has previously played in Major League Baseball (MLB) for the Philadelphia Phillies.

== Early life and amateur career ==
Hall grew up in Hereford, Arizona, and attended Buena High School.

Hall began his college baseball career at Cochise College as both a pitcher and a first baseman. He transferred to Dallas Baptist University after his sophomore year. In his only season with the Patriots, Hall was named the Missouri Valley Conference Player of the Year after he batted .302 and led the team with 20 home runs and 72 RBIs while also posting a 9–3 record as a pitcher. During the summer of 2014, Hall played for the Keene Swamp Bats of the New England Collegiate Baseball League.

== Professional career ==
=== Philadelphia Phillies ===
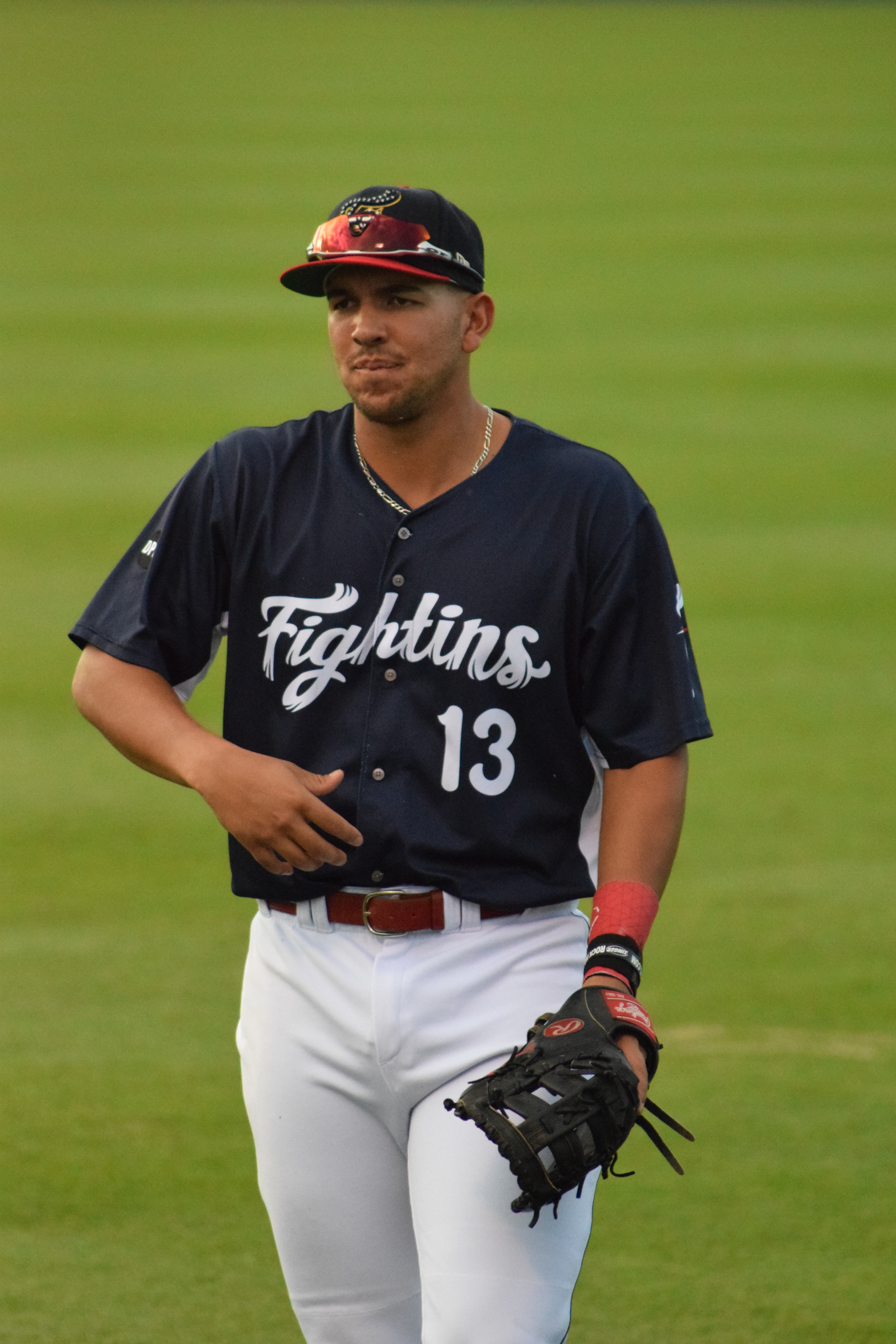
Hall with the Reading Fightin Phils in 2019

The Philadelphia Phillies selected Hall in the 14th round, with the 407th overall pick, of the 2016 Major League Baseball draft. He was assigned to the short-season Williamsport Crosscutters after signing with the team. In 2017, Hall started the season with the Single-A Lakewood BlueClaws and was named the South Atlantic League MVP after batting .272 with 28 doubles, 27 home runs, and 96 RBIs in 114 games. He was promoted to the High-A Clearwater Threshers late in the season. Hall started the 2018 season with Clearwater and slashed .277/.367/.538 over 48 games before being promoted to the Double-A Reading Fightin Phils. He returned to Reading for the 2019 season and was named an Eastern League All-Star after he batted .235 with 20 home runs and 67 RBIs. Hall did not play in a game in 2020 due to the cancellation of the Minor League Baseball season because of the COVID-19 pandemic. He spent the 2021 season with the Triple-A Lehigh Valley IronPigs and hit for a .230 average with 41 extra-base hits and 60 RBIs. He returned to Lehigh Valley at the beginning of the 2022 season.

Hall was promoted to the Phillies' major league roster on June 29, 2022. He made his debut that night against the Atlanta Braves, going 0-4 as the Phillies' designated hitter in a 4–1 loss. The following day, Hall recorded his first two Major League hits on a pair of home runs, helping the Phillies to a 14–4 win over Atlanta. Hall hit his third hit, and his third home run on July 1, 2022, off St. Louis Cardinals pitcher Miles Mikolas in a 5–3 victory. He became one of 9 players in the expansion era to hit home runs for each of his first three hits. Hall slashed .250/.282/.522 with eight doubles and nine home runs in 41 games played during 2022.

After Rhys Hoskins suffered a torn anterior cruciate ligament in spring training, Hall began the year as the Phillies' primary first baseman. After six games, Hall suffered a thumb injury during a slide against the New York Yankees. On April 12, it was announced that he would miss two months of action after undergoing surgery to repair the ulnar collateral ligament in his right thumb. Hall was activated from the injured list on June 19 and subsequently optioned to Triple–A Lehigh Valley. In 18 games for the Phillies in 2023, he batted .167/.196/.241 with one home run and three RBI.

Hall was optioned to Triple–A Lehigh Valley to begin the 2024 season. In 80 games, he slashed .248/.324/.402 with 12 home runs and 56 RBI. On August 9, 2024, Hall was designated for assignment by the Phillies. He cleared waivers and was sent outright to Triple–A Lehigh Valley on August 11. Hall elected free agency following the season on November 4.

=== Pittsburgh Pirates ===
On December 21, 2024, Hall signed a minor league contract with the Pittsburgh Pirates. In 59 appearances split between the Single-A Bradenton Marauders and Triple-A Indianapolis Indians, he batted a cumulative .202/.306/.290 with four home runs and 24 RBI. Hall was released by the Pirates organization on August 6, 2025.

=== Hagerstown Flying Boxcars ===
On May 12, 2026, Hall signed with the Hagerstown Flying Boxcars of the Atlantic League of Professional Baseball.

== Personal life ==
Hall's grandfather, James "Bo" Hall, played minor league baseball in the San Francisco Giants organization and was the head baseball coach at Cochise College and Eastern Arizona College. His uncle, Shane Hall, played three seasons in the Boston Red Sox organization.
