= Simón Muzziotti =

Venezuelan baseball player (born 1998)

Free agent
- Outfielder
- Born: December 27, 1998 (age 27); Cumaná, Venezuela
- Bats: Left Throws: Left

MLB debut
- April 11, 2022, for the Philadelphia Phillies

MLB statistics (through 2022 season)
- Batting average: .143
- Home runs: 0
- Runs batted in: 0
- Stats at Baseball Reference

Teams
- Philadelphia Phillies (2022)

Simón José Muzziotti (born December 27, 1998) is a Venezuelan professional baseball outfielder who is a free agent. He has previously played in Major League Baseball (MLB) for the Philadelphia Phillies.

== Career ==
=== Boston Red Sox ===
On July 2, 2015, Muzziotti signed with the Boston Red Sox organization as an international free agent. He made his professional debut with the Dominican Summer League Red Sox in 2016, and posted a .317/.354/.383 slash line in 17 games. On July 1, 2016, Muzziotti was declared a free agent after it was discovered that the Red Sox had violated international signing rules.

=== Philadelphia Phillies ===
On July 5, 2016, Muzziotti signed a minor league contract with the Philadelphia Phillies organization. He finished the year with the Dominican Summer League Phillies, slashing .231/.286/.273 with 12 RBI. In 2017, Muzziotti split the season between the Rookie-level GCL Phillies and the High-A Clearwater Threshers, accumulating a .270/.304/.383 slash line with 14 RBI in 35 games. In 2018, he split the year between the GCL Phillies and the Single-A Lakewood BlueClaws, posting a .250/.289/.313 batting line with 1 home run and 22 RBI. In 2019, Muzziotti returned to Clearwater and hit .287/.337/.372 with career-highs in home runs (3) and RBI (28).

Muzziotti did not play in a game in 2020 due to the cancellation of the minor league season because of the COVID-19 pandemic. On November 20, 2020, the Phillies added Muzziotti to their 40-man roster to protect him from the Rule 5 draft. On March 26, 2021, Muzziotti was placed on the restricted list after experiencing visa issues.

Muzziotti was promoted to the major leagues for the first time on April 8, 2022, after the team suffered multiple injuries in the outfield. He made his MLB debut on April 11 as a defensive replacement, then made his first start for the Phillies the following day. He went 1–for–7 in 9 games for the Phillies, spending the majority of his season with the Double–A Reading Fightin Phils. His season ended on August 26, after he was diagnosed with a partially torn right patellar tendon.

Muzziotti was optioned to the Triple-A Lehigh Valley IronPigs to begin the 2023 season. He spent the entire season in Triple–A, playing in 124 games and batting .296/.358/.404 with 7 home runs, 61 RBI, and 26 stolen bases.

Muzziotti was designated for assignment by the Phillies on February 7, 2024. He cleared waivers and was sent outright to Triple-A on February 11. In 65 games split between Lehigh Valley and Jersey Shore, Muzziotti batted .225/.286/.362 with five home runs, 25 RBI, and five stolen bases. He was released by the Phillies organization on August 6.

=== Pericos de Puebla ===
On November 29, 2024, Muzziotti signed with the Pericos de Puebla of the Mexican League. He made 55 appearances for the team, slashing .253/.302/.383 with three home runs, 23 RBI, and four stolen bases. Muzziotti was released by the Pericos on July 11, 2025.

=== Rieleros de Aguascalientes ===
On November 14, 2025, Muzziotti signed with the Rieleros de Aguascalientes of the Mexican League. Muzziotti made 18 appearances for Aguascalientes in 2026, batting .294/.377/.500 with three home runs and eight RBI.

=== Leones de Yucatán ===
On May 26, 2026, Muzziotti was traded to the Leones de Yucatán of the Mexican League. In 26 appearances for the Leones, he batted .197/.274/.303 with no home runs and four RBI. On July 3, Muzziotti was released by Yucatán.
