= Nick Nelson (baseball) =

American baseball player (born 1995)

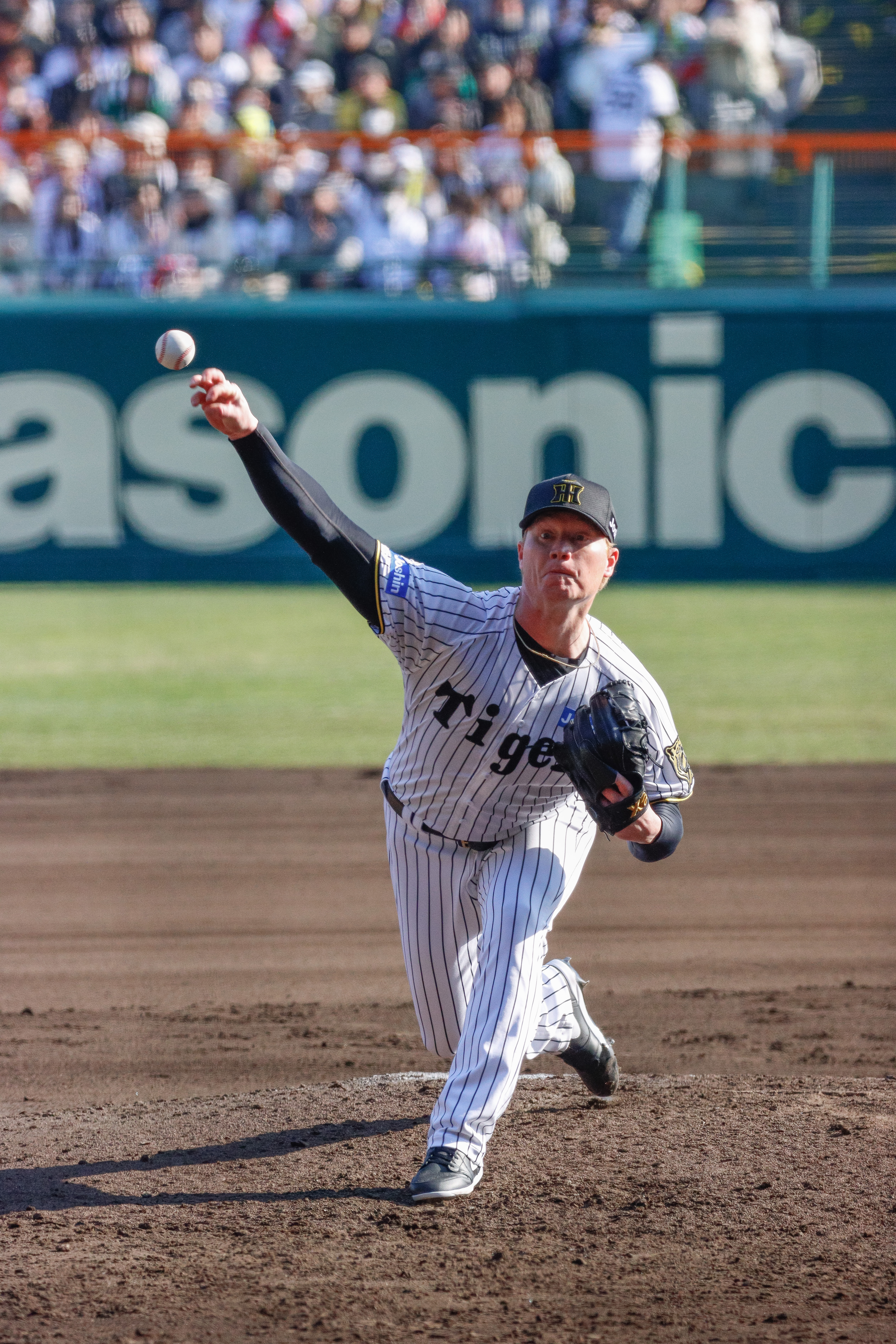
- Nelson with the Hanshin Tigers

Free agent
- Pitcher
- Born: December 5, 1995 (age 30); Panama City, Florida, U.S.
- Bats: Right Throws: Right

Professional debut
- MLB: August 1, 2020, for the New York Yankees
- NPB: April 27, 2025, for the Hanshin Tigers
- CPBL: March 29, 2026, for the CTBC Brothers

MLB statistics (through 2024 season)
- Win–loss record: 5–4
- Earned run average: 5.20
- Strikeouts: 120

NPB statistics (through 2025 season)
- Win–loss record: 2–1
- Earned run average: 1.93
- Strikeouts: 25

CPBL statistics (through 2026 season)
- Win–loss record: 0–5
- Earned run average: 4.91
- Strikeouts: 20
- Stats at Baseball Reference

Teams
- New York Yankees (2020–2021); Philadelphia Phillies (2022–2024); Hanshin Tigers (2025); CTBC Brothers (2026)

Nicholas Benjamin Nelson (born December 5, 1995) is an American professional baseball pitcher who is a free agent. He has previously played in Major League Baseball (MLB) for the New York Yankees and Philadelphia Phillies, in Nippon Professional Baseball (NPB) for the Hanshin Tigers, and in the Chinese Professional Baseball League (CPBL) for the CTBC Brothers.

== Career ==
=== New York Yankees ===
Nelson attended Rutherford High School in Panama City, Florida. He was drafted by the San Francisco Giants in the 31st round of the 2014 MLB draft, but did not sign and played college baseball at Gulf Coast Community College. He was then drafted by the New York Yankees in the fourth round of the 2016 MLB draft and signed.

Nelson made his professional debut with the Pulaski Yankees, going 0–3 with a 3.38 ERA over 21 1/3 innings. He pitched 2017 with the Charleston RiverDogs, compiling a 3–12 record with a 4.56 ERA over 22 starts, and 2018 with Charleston, Tampa Tarpons and Trenton Thunder, pitching to a combined 8–6 record with a 3.55 ERA over 26 games (25 starts) between the three teams. He pitched 2019 with Tampa, Trenton, and the Scranton/Wilkes-Barre RailRiders, going 8–3 with a 2.81 ERA over 18 games (17 starts), striking out 114 over 89 2/3 innings.

Nelson was added to the Yankees' MLB roster on July 26, 2020. He made his MLB debut in the August 1 game against the Boston Red Sox, pitching three shutout innings in relief, and was credited with the win. He finished his rookie campaign making 11 appearances and logging a 4.79 ERA with 18 strikeouts in 20 2/3 innings pitched.

In 2021, Nelson made 11 appearances for the Yankees, but struggled to an 8.79 ERA with 22 strikeouts in 14 1/3 innings of work. In a larger sample size with Triple-A Scranton, Nelson worked to a 3.81 ERA with 62 strikeouts in 29 games.

=== Philadelphia Phillies ===
The Yankees traded Nelson and Donny Sands to the Philadelphia Phillies in exchange for T. J. Rumfield and Joel Valdez on November 19, 2021. On September 9, 2022, he recorded his first career save, pitching in relief of Brad Hand in a 5–3 victory over the Washington Nationals. In 2022, Nelson worked mainly as a long reliever, making 47 appearances for the Phillies and registering a 4.85 ERA with 69 strikeouts in 68 2/3 innings of work.

Nelson made only one appearance for Philadelphia in 2023, recording the win after allowing one run with three strikeouts across 5 1/3 innings against the New York Mets.

Nelson was optioned to the Triple–A Lehigh Valley IronPigs to begin the 2024 season. In three games for the Phillies, he posted a 5.40 ERA with 5 strikeouts over 3 1/3 innings pitched. Nelson was designated for assignment by the Phillies on August 11. He cleared waivers and was sent outright to Lehigh Valley on August 13. On September 4, the Phillies selected Nelson's contract, adding him to their active roster. He allowed one run in two innings of relief against the Miami Marlins in his only appearance, and was designated for assignment by the Phillies on September 7. Nelson cleared waivers and was sent outright to Lehigh Valley on September 11. He elected free agency on October 10.

=== Hanshin Tigers ===
On December 20, 2024, Nelson signed a one–year, $1 million contract with the Hanshin Tigers of Nippon Professional Baseball. He made 23 appearances for Hanshin in 2025, posting a 2-1 record and 1.93 ERA with 25 strikeouts across 32 2/3 innings pitched. On December 2, 2025, Nelson and the Tigers parted ways.

=== CTBC Brothers ===
On January 23, 2026, Nelson signed with the CTBC Brothers of the Chinese Professional Baseball League. He made seven appearances (including five starts) for the team, posting an 0-5 record and 4.91 ERA with 20 strikeouts across 29 1/3 innings pitched. Nelson was released by the Brothers on May 26.

== Personal life ==
Nelson is married to his wife, Abigail. At the time of his MLB debut, his daughter, Hynleigh, was 11 months old.
