= 2022 Texas Rangers season =

Major League Baseball season

2022 Texas Rangers
- League: American League
- Division: West
- Ballpark: Globe Life Field
- City: Arlington
- Record: 68–94 (.420)
- Divisional place: 4th
- Owners: Ray Davis & Bob R. Simpson
- Managers: Chris Woodward - released August 15, 2022; Tony Beasley interim manager as of August 15, 2022
- Television: Bally Sports Southwest (Dave Raymond, C.J. Nitkowski, Tom Grieve, Dave Valle)
- Radio: KRLD 105.3 FM (English) (Eric Nadel, Matt Hicks, Dave Raymond); KZMP 1540 AM (Spanish) (Eleno Orlenas, Jerry Romo)
- Stats: ESPN.com; Baseball Reference

The 2022 Texas Rangers season was the 62nd of the Texas Rangers franchise overall, their 51st in Arlington as the Rangers, and the third season at Globe Life Field. As the club's 51st season in Arlington, the 2022 season also marked the 50th anniversary of the team's first season as the Texas Rangers in 1972.

On December 2, 2021, Commissioner of Baseball Rob Manfred announced a lockout of players, following expiration of the collective bargaining agreement (CBA) between the league and the Major League Baseball Players Association (MLBPA). On March 10, 2022, MLB and the MLBPA agreed to a new collective bargaining agreement, thus ending the lockout. Opening Day was played on April 7. Although MLB previously announced that several series would be cancelled due to the lockout, the agreement provides for a 162-game season, with originally canceled games to be made up via doubleheaders.

The Rangers became the first team in history to be strikeout victims of two immaculate innings pitched in the same game on June 15, by Luis García and Phil Maton of the Houston Astros. It was also the first occasion in major league history two immaculate innings were pitched on the same date. On July 31, Reid Detmers of the Los Angeles Angels hurled another immaculate inning against the Rangers, joining the 1979 San Francisco Giants as the only teams to have three while batting.

On August 15, 2022, the Rangers fired manager Chris Woodward after a 51–63 record through 114 games. Tony Beasley was named interim manager for the remainder of the season. On September 14, the Rangers set a new club record for losses by one-run with 32 (with only 13 wins by one run).

On August 17, 2022, the Rangers fired President of Baseball Operations Jon Daniels. Chris Young, who was named general manager in 2020 to take over the role from Daniels, was named the new club president.

The Rangers missed the postseason for the sixth consecutive season, finishing fourth in the American League West. Their 68–94 record is the worst for a team that won the World Series the following year.

== Offseason ==
=== Lockout ===
The expiration of the league's collective bargaining agreement (CBA) with the Major League Baseball Players Association occurred on December 1, 2021, with no new agreement in place. As a result, the team owners voted unanimously to lockout the players stopping all free agency and trades.

The parties came to an agreement on a new CBA on March 10, 2022.

=== Rule changes ===
Pursuant to the new CBA, several new rules were instituted for the 2022 season. The National League will adopt the designated hitter full-time, a draft lottery will be implemented, the postseason will expand from ten teams to twelve, and advertising patches will appear on player uniforms and helmets for the first time.

== Regular season ==
=== Summary ===
On June 15, the Rangers were victim of two immaculate innings delivered by the Houston Astros, the first such feat by one team—and the first time two were delivered on the same date—in major league history. Starting pitcher Luis García hurled one in the second inning to strike out Nathaniel Lowe, Ezequiel Durán, and Brad Miller. Five innings later, reliever Phil Maton struck out the same trio of batters for the second immaculate inning.

The Rangers fell victim to another immaculate inning on July 31, by Los Angeles Angels rookie starter Reid Detmers. In the fourth inning, he struck out Durán, Kole Calhoun and Charlie Culberson. Durán became the first major league hitter to strike out in three immaculate innings in the same season. Also, the Rangers joined the 1979 San Francisco Giants as the only major league teams to strike out through three immaculate innings while batting.

=== Season standings ===
==== American League West ====
AL West
Team	W	L	Pct.	GB	Home	Road
Houston Astros	106	56	.654	—	55‍–‍26	51‍–‍30
Seattle Mariners	90	72	.556	16	46‍–‍35	44‍–‍37
Los Angeles Angels	73	89	.451	33	40‍–‍41	33‍–‍48
Texas Rangers	68	94	.420	38	34‍–‍47	34‍–‍47
Oakland Athletics	60	102	.370	46	29‍–‍51	31‍–‍51

==== American League Wild Card ====
Division leaders
Team	W	L	Pct.
Houston Astros	106	56	.654
New York Yankees	99	63	.611
Cleveland Guardians	92	70	.568

Wild Card teams (Top 3 teams qualify for postseason)
Team	W	L	Pct.	GB
Toronto Blue Jays	92	70	.568	+6
Seattle Mariners	90	72	.556	+4
Tampa Bay Rays	86	76	.531	—
Baltimore Orioles	83	79	.512	3
Chicago White Sox	81	81	.500	5
Minnesota Twins	78	84	.481	8
Boston Red Sox	78	84	.481	8
Los Angeles Angels	73	89	.451	13
Texas Rangers	68	94	.420	18
Detroit Tigers	66	96	.407	20
Kansas City Royals	65	97	.401	21
Oakland Athletics	60	102	.370	26

==== Record against opponents ====
2022 American League record Source: MLB Standings Grid – 2022
Team	BAL	BOS	CWS	CLE	DET	HOU	KC	LAA	MIN	NYY	OAK	SEA	TB	TEX	TOR	NL
Baltimore	—	9–10	5–2	3–3	1–5	4–3	4–3	6–1	3–4	7–12	3–4	2–4	9–10	6–0	9–10	12–8
Boston	10–9	—	2–4	5–2	5–1	4–2	3–4	4–3	3–4	6–13	5–1	6–1	7–12	6–1	3–16	9–11
Chicago	2–5	4–2	—	7–12	12–7	3–4	9–10	3–4	9–10	3–4	5–2	4–2	4–2	3–4	2–4	11–9
Cleveland	3–3	2–5	12–7	—	10–9	3–4	12–7	3–4	13–6	1–5	6–1	1–6	4–2	5–1	5–2	12–8
Detroit	5–1	1–5	7–12	9–10	—	0–7	10–9	3–3	8–11	1–5	2–5	1–6	2–5	4–3	2–5	11–9
Houston	3–4	2–4	4–3	4–3	7–0	—	5–2	13–6	6–0	5–2	12–7	12–7	5–1	14–5	2–4	12–8
Kansas City	3–4	4–3	10–9	7–12	9–10	2–5	—	3–3	7–12	1–6	3–3	2–4	3–4	2–4	2–5	7–13
Los Angeles	1–6	3–4	4–3	4–3	3–3	6–13	3–3	—	4–2	2–4	12–7	10–9	2–5	9–10	3–4	7–13
Minnesota	4–3	4–3	10–9	6–13	11–8	0–6	12–7	2–4	—	2–5	5–1	4–3	4–2	2–5	4–3	8–12
New York	12–7	13–6	4–3	5–1	5–1	2–5	6–1	4–2	5–2	—	5–2	2–4	11–8	4–3	11–8	10–10
Oakland	4–3	1–5	2–5	1–6	5–2	7–12	3–3	7–12	1–5	2–5	—	8–11	3–4	8–11	3–3	5–15
Seattle	4–2	1–6	2–4	6–1	6–1	7–12	4–2	9–10	3–4	4–2	11–8	—	2–5	14–5	5–2	12–8
Tampa Bay	10–9	12–7	2–4	2–4	5–2	1–5	4–3	5–2	2–4	8–11	4–3	5–2	—	4–3	10–9	12–8
Texas	0–6	1–6	4–3	1–5	3–4	5–14	4–2	10–9	5–2	3–4	11–8	5–14	3–4	—	2–4	11–9
Toronto	10–9	16–3	4–2	2–5	5–2	4–2	5–2	4–3	3–4	8–11	3–3	2–5	9–10	4–2	—	13–7

Updated with the results of all games through October 5, 2022.

== Game log ==
Legend
Rangers Win	Rangers Loss	Game postponed

2022 Game Log: 68–94 (Home: 34–47; Away: 34–47)
April: 7–14 (Home: 3–9; Away: 4–5)

#	Date	Opponent	Score	Win	Loss	Save	Stadium	Attendance	Record	Streak
1	April 8	@ Blue Jays	8–10	Cimber (1–0)	Santana (0–1)	Romano (1)	Rogers Centre	45,022	0–1	L1
2	April 9	@ Blue Jays	3–4	Richards (1–0)	Martin (0–1)	Romano (2)	Rogers Centre	43,486	0–2	L2
3	April 10	@ Blue Jays	12–6	Burke (1–0)	Merryweather (0–1)	—	Rogers Centre	31,549	1–2	W1
4	April 11	Rockies	4–6 (10)	Bard (1–0)	Holland (0–1)	Goudeau (1)	Globe Life Field	35,052	1–3	L1
5	April 12	Rockies	1–4	Chacín (1–0)	Pérez (0–1)	Bard (1)	Globe Life Field	15,862	1–4	L2
6	April 14	Angels	10–5	King (1–0)	Ohtani (0–2)	—	Globe Life Field	21,440	2–4	W1
7	April 15	Angels	6–9	Warren (1–0)	Allard (0–1)	Iglesias (2)	Globe Life Field	28,723	2–5	L1
8	April 16	Angels	2–7	Syndergaard (2–0)	Hearn (0–1)	—	Globe Life Field	34,493	2–6	L2
9	April 17	Angels	3–8	Mayers (1–0)	Pérez (0–2)	—	Globe Life Field	22,650	2–7	L3
10	April 19	@ Mariners	2–6	Ray (2–1)	Gray (0–1)	—	T-Mobile Park	11,067	2–8	L4
11	April 20	@ Mariners	2–4	Gilbert (2–0)	Dunning (0–1)	—	T-Mobile Park	9,374	2–9	L5
12	April 21	@ Mariners	8–6	Barlow (1–0)	Steckenrider (0–1)	—	T-Mobile Park	12,570	3–9	W1
13	April 22	@ Athletics	8–1	Otto (1–0)	Oller (0–2)	—	Oakland Coliseum	7,012	4–9	W2
14	April 23	@ Athletics	2–0	Burke (2–0)	Montas (2–2)	Bush (1)	Oakland Coliseum	9,120	5–9	W3
15	April 24	@ Athletics	0–2	Irvin (2–1)	Howard (0–1)	Jiménez (3)	Oakland Coliseum	11,083	5–10	L1
16	April 25	Astros	6–2	Moore (1–0)	Maton (0–1)	—	Globe Life Field	17,420	6–10	W1
17	April 26	Astros	1–5	Odorizzi (1–2)	Hearn (0–2)	—	Globe Life Field	16,469	6–11	L1
18	April 27	Astros	3–4	Javier (1–0)	Martin (0–2)	Stanek (1)	Globe Life Field	20,399	6–12	L2
19	April 28	Astros	2–3	Verlander (2–1)	Bush (0–1)	Montero (1)	Globe Life Field	19,484	6–13	L3
20	April 29	Braves	3–6	Anderson (2–1)	Richards (0–1)	Jansen (6)	Globe Life Field	25,829	6–14	L4
21	April 30	Braves	3–1	Dunning (1–1)	Elder (1–3)	Barlow (1)	Globe Life Field	36,097	7–14	W1

May: 17–10 (Home: 9–3; Away: 8–7)

#	Date	Opponent	Score	Win	Loss	Save	Stadium	Attendance	Record	Streak
22	May 1	Braves	7–3	Hearn (1–2)	Muller (0–1)	—	Globe Life Field	38,316	8–14	W2
23	May 3	@ Phillies	6–4	Burke (3–0)	Suárez (2–1)	Barlow (2)	Citizens Bank Park	27,788	9–14	W3
24	May 4	@ Phillies	2–1 (10)	Bush (1–1)	Hand (1–1)	Barlow (3)	Citizens Bank Park	21,315	10–14	W4
25	May 8	@ Yankees	1–2	Holmes (3–0)	King (1–1)	—	Yankee Stadium	see 2nd game	10–15	L1
26	May 8	@ Yankees	4–2	Richards (1–1)	King (2–1)	Barlow (4)	Yankee Stadium	40,714	11–15	W1
27	May 9	@ Yankees	0–1	Holmes (4–0)	Martin (0–3)	Chapman (7)	Yankee Stadium	34,866	11–16	L1
28	May 10	Royals	6–4	Pérez (1–2)	Keller (1–3)	Barlow (5)	Globe Life Field	15,407	12–16	W1
29	May 11	Royals	2–8	Payamps (1–0)	Allard (0–2)	—	Globe Life Field	15,561	12–17	L1
30	May 12	Royals	3–1	Hearn (2–2)	Heasley (0–1)	Barlow (6)	Globe Life Field	14,994	13–17	W1
31	May 13	Red Sox	1–7	Pivetta (1–4)	Dunning (1–2)	—	Globe Life Field	28,324	13–18	L1
32	May 14	Red Sox	3–11	Hill (1–1)	Otto (1–1)	—	Globe Life Field	34,462	13–19	L2
33	May 15	Red Sox	7–1	Pérez (2–2)	Brasier (0–2)	—	Globe Life Field	27,607	14–19	W1
34	May 16	Angels	7–4	Gray (1–1)	Syndergaard (3–2)	Barlow (7)	Globe Life Field	15,110	15–19	W2
35	May 17	Angels	10–5	Santana (1–1)	Tepera (1–1)	—	Globe Life Field	17,727	16–19	W3
36	May 18	Angels	6–5 (10)	Santana (2–1)	Iglesias (1–2)	—	Globe Life Field	20,366	17–19	W4
37	May 19	@ Astros	1–5	Valdez (3–2)	Otto (1–2)	—	Minute Maid Park	34,593	17–20	L1
38	May 20	@ Astros	3–0	Pérez (3–2)	Javier (2–2)	—	Minute Maid Park	35,294	18–20	W1
39	May 21	@ Astros	1–2	Verlander (6–1)	Gray (1–2)	Pressly (5)	Minute Maid Park	37,187	18–21	L1
40	May 22	@ Astros	2–5	Urquidy (4–1)	Hearn (2–3)	Pressly (6)	Minute Maid Park	38,745	18–22	L2
41	May 24	@ Angels	3–5	Syndergaard (4–2)	Dunning (1–3)	Iglesias (11)	Angel Stadium	23,791	18–23	L3
42	May 25	@ Angels	7–2	Otto (2–2)	Detmers (2–2)	—	Angel Stadium	22,950	19–23	W1
43	May 26	@ Athletics	4–1	Bush (2–1)	Trivino (1–3)	Barlow (8)	Oakland Coliseum	3,203	20–23	W2
44	May 27	@ Athletics	8–5	Moore (2–0)	Jiménez (1–2)	Santana (1)	Oakland Coliseum	5,010	21–23	W3
45	May 28	@ Athletics	11–4	Hearn (3–3)	Logue (2–4)	—	Oakland Coliseum	6,502	22–23	W4
46	May 29	@ Athletics	5–6	Jiménez (2–2)	Martin (0–4)	—	Oakland Coliseum	8,342	22–24	L1
47	May 30	Rays	9–5	Otto (3–2)	Rasmussen (5–2)	—	Globe Life Field	25,605	23–24	W1
48	May 31	Rays	3–0	Pérez (4–2)	Yarbrough (0–2)	Barlow (9)	Globe Life Field	16,317	24–24	W2

June: 12–14 (Home: 5–8; Away: 7–6)

#	Date	Opponent	Score	Win	Loss	Save	Stadium	Attendance	Record	Streak
49	June 1	Rays	3–4 (11)	Poche (1–0)	Santana (2–2)	Wisler (1)	Globe Life Field	20,634	24–25	L1
50	June 2	Rays	1–3	Kluber (2–2)	Hearn (3–4)	Thompson (3)	Globe Life Field	17,097	24–26	L2
51	June 3	Mariners	3–4	Murfee (1–0)	Barlow (1–1)	Sewald (3)	Globe Life Field	25,378	24–27	L3
52	June 4	Mariners	3–2	Otto (4–2)	Gonzales (3–6)	Barlow (10)	Globe Life Field	28,794	25–27	W1
53	June 5	Mariners	5–6 (10)	Castillo (3–0)	Burke (3–1)	Sewald (4)	Globe Life Field	27,427	25–28	L1
—	June 6	@ Guardians	Postponed (rain); Makeup June 7							
54	June 7 (1)	@ Guardians	3–6	Quantrill (3–3)	Gray (1–3)	Clase (10)	Progressive Field	see 2nd game	25–29	L2
55	June 7 (2)	@ Guardians	6–3	Hearn (4–4)	McCarty (0–1)	Barlow (11)	Progressive Field	10,763	26–29	W1
56	June 8	@ Guardians	0–4	Morgan (2–1)	Dunning (1–4)	—	Progressive Field	10,965	26–30	L1
57	June 10	@ White Sox	3–8	Graveman (2–1)	King (1–2)	—	Guaranteed Rate Field	24,270	26–31	L2
58	June 11	@ White Sox	11–9 (10)	Moore (3–0)	Foster (1–1)	—	Guaranteed Rate Field	30,221	27–31	W1
59	June 12	@ White Sox	8–6 (12)	Barlow (2–1)	Foster (1–2)	Allard (1)	Guaranteed Rate Field	31,096	28–31	W2
60	June 13	Astros	5–3	Burke (4–1)	Neris (1–3)	Moore (1)	Globe Life Field	29,805	29–31	W3
61	June 14	Astros	3–4	Abreu (4–0)	King (1–3)	Pressly (12)	Globe Life Field	29,370	29–32	L1
62	June 15	Astros	2–9	García (4–5)	Miller (0–1)	—	Globe Life Field	24,992	29–33	L2
63	June 16	@ Tigers	3–1	Santana (3–2)	Soto (2–4)	Barlow (12)	Comerica Park	17,448	30–33	W1
64	June 17	@ Tigers	7–0	Gray (2–3)	Skubal (5–4)	—	Comerica Park	21,996	31–33	W2
65	June 18	@ Tigers	7–14	García (1–2)	Hearn (4–5)	—	Comerica Park	28,179	31–34	L1
66	June 19	@ Tigers	3–7	Lange (4–1)	Dunning (1–5	—	Comerica Park	25,919	31–35	L2
67	June 21	Phillies	7–0	Pérez (5–2)	Gibson (4–3)	—	Globe Life Field	29,153	32–35	W1
68	June 22	Phillies	4–2	Gray (3–3)	Wheeler (6–4)	Barlow (13)	Globe Life Field	20,704	33–35	W2
69	June 24	Nationals	1–2	Edwards Jr. (1–1)	Santana (3–3)	Rainey (9)	Globe Life Field	28,854	33–36	L1
70	June 25	Nationals	3–2	Barlow (3–1)	Finnegan (2–2)	—	Globe Life Field	36,183	34–36	W1
71	June 26	Nationals	4–6	Tetreault (2–1)	Otto (4–3)	Rainey (10)	Globe Life Field	34,220	34–37	L1
72	June 27	@ Royals	10–4	Pérez (6–2)	Bubic (1–5)	—	Kauffman Stadium	12,876	35–37	W1
73	June 28	@ Royals	8–3	Gray (4–3)	Heasley (1–4)	—	Kauffman Stadium	19,593	36–37	W2
74	June 29	@ Royals	1–2	Greinke (2–4)	Dunning (1–6)	Barlow (10)	Kauffman Stadium	11,391	36–38	L1

July: 10–17 (Home: 4–6; Away: 6–11)

#	Date	Opponent	Score	Win	Loss	Save	Stadium	Attendance	Record	Streak
75	July 1	@ Mets	3–4	Peterson (5–1)	Otto (4–4)	Díaz (17)	Citi Field	35,639	36–39	L2
76	July 2	@ Mets	7–3	Pérez (7–2)	Williams (1–5)	—	Citi Field	26,494	37–39	W1
77	July 3	@ Mets	1–4	Carrasco (9–4)	Gray (4–4)	Díaz (18)	Citi Field	25,241	37–40	L1
78	July 4	@ Orioles	6–7 (10)	Baker (3–3)	Moore (3–1)	—	Camden Yards	18,670	37–41	L2
79	July 5	@ Orioles	9–10 (10)	Krehbiel (4–3)	Moore (3–2)	—	Camden Yards	7,371	37–42	L3
80	July 6	@ Orioles	1–2	Watkins (2–1)	Otto (4–5)	López (14)	Camden Yards	7,648	37–43	L4
81	July 8	Twins	6–5	Gray (5–4)	Gray (4–2)	Martin (1)	Globe Life Field	30,392	38–43	W1
82	July 9	Twins	9–7	Moore (4–2)	Durán (0–3)	Martin (2)	Globe Life Field	35,427	39–43	W2
83	July 10	Twins	5–6	Bundy (5–4)	Burke (4–2)	Duffey (2)	Globe Life Field	24,751	39–44	L1
84	July 11	Athletics	10–8	Howard (1–0)	Martínez (2–2)	Martin (3)	Globe Life Field	20,660	40–44	W1
85	July 12	Athletics	7–14 (12)	Snead (1–0)	Santana (3–4)	—	Globe Life Field	17,485	40–45	L1
86	July 13	Athletics	5–2	Gray (6–4)	Blackburn (6–5)	Richards (1)	Globe Life Field	22,394	41–45	W1
87	July 14	Mariners	5–6	Festa (2–0)	Santana (3–5)	Castillo (6)	Globe Life Field	19,243	41–46	L1
88	July 15	Mariners	3–8	Ray (8–6)	Hearn (4–6)	—	Globe Life Field	26,494	41–47	L2
89	July 16	Mariners	2–3 (10)	Castillo (7–1)	Martin (0–5)	Festa (1)	Globe Life Field	35,761	41–48	L3
90	July 17	Mariners	2–6	Borucki (2–0)	Otto (4–6)	—	Globe Life Field	26,378	41–49	L4
92nd All-Star Game: Los Angeles, CA
91	July 21	@ Marlins	8–0	Gray (7–4)	López (6–5)	—	LoanDepot Park	9,524	42–49	W1
92	July 22	@ Athletics	4–5	Irvin (5–7)	Howard (1–2)	Puk (1)	Oakland Coliseum	6,620	42–50	L1
93	July 23	@ Athletics	1–3	Acevedo (3–2)	Santana (3–6)	Jackson (2)	Oakland Coliseum	10,190	42–51	L2
94	July 24	@ Athletics	11–8	Pérez (8–2)	Blackburn (6–6)	—	Oakland Coliseum	9,835	43–51	W1
95	July 25	@ Mariners	3–4	Flexen (7–8)	Otto (4–7)	Swanson (2)	T-Mobile Park	23,581	43–52	L1
96	July 26	@ Mariners	4–5	Swanson (1–0)	Martin (0–6)	—	T-Mobile Park	25,837	43–53	L2
97	July 27	@ Mariners	2–4	Gonzales (6–10)	Gray (7–5)	Festa (2)	T-Mobile Park	25,509	43–54	L3
98	July 28	@ Angels	2–0	Howard (2–2)	Ohtani (9–6)	Moore (2)	Angel Stadium	29,718	44–54	W1
99	July 29	@ Angels	7–2	Pérez (9–2)	Sandoval (3–7)	—	Angel Stadium	29,906	45–54	W2
100	July 30	@ Angels	7–9	Toussaint (1–0)	Martin (0–7)	Iglesias (16)	Angel Stadium	32,968	45–55	L1
101	July 31	@ Angels	5–2	Burke (5–2)	Quijada (0–3)	Hernández (1)	Angel Stadium	29,257	46–55	W1

August: 12–16 (Home: 7–12; Away: 5–4)

#	Date	Opponent	Score	Win	Loss	Save	Stadium	Attendance	Record	Streak
102	August 1	Orioles	2–7	Watkins (4–1)	Gray (7–6)	Akin (2)	Globe Life Field	19,161	46–56	L1
103	August 2	Orioles	2–8	Lyles (8–8)	Howard (2–3)	—	Globe Life Field	21,622	46–57	L2
104	August 3	Orioles	3–6	Pérez (6–1)	Leclerc (0–1)	—	Globe Life Field	20,221	46–58	L3
105	August 4	White Sox	3–2	Burke (6–2)	Cueto (4–5)	Hernández (2)	Globe Life Field	20,972	47–58	W1
106	August 5	White Sox	1–2	Cease (12–4)	Otto (4–8)	Hendriks (22)	Globe Life Field	25,470	47–59	L1
107	August 6	White Sox	8–0	Dunning (2–6)	Kopech (4–8)	—	Globe Life Field	38,275	48–59	W1
108	August 7	White Sox	2–8	Giolito (8–6)	Howard (2–4)	—	Globe Life Field	29,579	48–60	L1
109	August 9	@ Astros	5–7	Urquidy (11–4)	Pérez (9–3)	Pressly (22)	Minute Maid Park	30,629	48–61	L2
110	August 10	@ Astros	8–4 (10)	Hearn (5–6)	Maton (0–2)	—	Minute Maid Park	26,670	49–61	W1
111	August 11	@ Astros	3–7	Valdez (11–4)	Ragans (0–1)	—	Minute Maid Park	30,872	49–62	L1
112	August 12	Mariners	2–6	Kirby (4–3)	Hearn (5–7)	—	Globe Life Field	22,622	49–63	L2
113	August 13	Mariners	7–4	Martin (1–7)	Gonzales (7–12)	Hernández (3)	Globe Life Field	31,621	50–63	W1
114	August 14	Mariners	5–3	Sborz (1–0)	Brash (3–4)	Leclerc (1)	Globe Life Field	25,560	51–63	W2
115	August 15	Athletics	2–1	Otto (5–8)	Kaprielian (3–7)	Hernández (4)	Globe Life Field	13,141	52–63	W3
116	August 16	Athletics	1–5	Sears (4–0)	Arihara (0–1)	—	Globe Life Field	15,260	52–64	L1
117	August 17	Athletics	2–7	Oller (2–5)	Ragans (0–2)	—	Globe Life Field	14,846	52–65	L2
118	August 18	Athletics	10–3	Dunning (3–6)	Logue (3–7)	—	Globe Life Field	16,495	53–65	W1
119	August 19	@ Twins	1–2	Bundy (7–5)	Pérez (9–4)	López (22)	Target Field	22,627	53–66	L1
120	August 20	@ Twins	4–3 (10)	Hernández (1–0)	Thielbar (2–2)	—	Target Field	21,781	54–66	W1
121	August 21	@ Twins	7–0	Arihara (1–1)	Ryan (9–6)	Hearn (1)	Target Field	24,802	55–66	W2
122	August 22	@ Twins	2–1	Alexy (1–0)	Gray (7–4)	Moore (3)	Target Field	18,595	56–66	W3
123	August 23	@ Rockies	6–7	Lawrence (2–1)	Burke (6–3)	Bard (26)	Coors Field	28,533	56–67	L1
124	August 24	@ Rockies	16–4	Pérez (10–4)	Ureña (2–5)	—	Coors Field	25,213	57–67	W1
125	August 26	Tigers	7–6	Otto (6–8)	Alexander (3–8)	Leclerc (2)	Globe Life Field	20,357	58–67	W2
126	August 27	Tigers	2–11	Rodríguez (3–3)	Keuchel (2–8)	—	Globe Life Field	34,357	58–68	L1
127	August 28	Tigers	8–9	Hutchison (2–7)	Arihara (2–1)	Jiménez (2)	Globe Life Field	24,938	58–69	L2
128	August 30	Astros	2–4	Valdez (14–4)	Dunning (3–7)	Neris (3)	Globe Life Field	25,566	58–70	L3
129	August 31	Astros	3–5	Javier (8–9)	Pérez (10–5)	Montero (10)	Globe Life Field	19,607	58–71	L4

September: 8–19 (Home: 4–7; Away: 4–12)

#	Date	Opponent	Score	Win	Loss	Save	Stadium	Attendance	Record	Streak
130	September 1	@ Red Sox	8–9	Familia (2–1)	Hernández (1–1)	—	Fenway Park	31,340	58–72	L5
131	September 2	@ Red Sox	1–9	Danish (3–1)	Keuchel (2–9)	—	Fenway Park	31,628	58–73	L6
132	September 3	@ Red Sox	3–5	Bello (1–4)	Santana (3–7)	Schreiber (6)	Fenway Park	31,474	58–74	L7
133	September 4	@ Red Sox	2–5	Ort (1–1)	Dunning (3–8)	Schreiber (7)	Fenway Park	32,422	58–75	L8
134	September 5	@ Astros	0–1	Brown (1–0)	Pérez (10–6)	Montero (12)	Minute Maid Park	35,162	58–76	L9
135	September 6	@ Astros	4–3	Hearn (6–7)	Valdez (14–5)	Leclerc (3)	Minute Maid Park	26,803	59–76	W1
136	September 7	@ Astros	3–4 (10)	Neris (5–4)	Hernández (1–2)	—	Minute Maid Park	26,239	59–77	L1
137	September 9	Blue Jays	3–4	Mayza (6–0)	Leclerc (0–2)	Romano (32)	Globe Life Field	21,329	59–78	L2
138	September 10	Blue Jays	7–11	Gausman (12–9)	Arihara (1–3)	Mayza (1)	Globe Life Field	28,340	59–79	L3
139	September 11	Blue Jays	4–1	Pérez (11–6)	Richards (3–2)	Leclerc (4)	Globe Life Field	20,984	60–79	W1
140	September 12 (1)	@ Marlins	3–2	Hernández (2–2)	Okert (5–3)	Leclerc (5)	LoanDepot Park	5,095	61–79	W2
141	September 12 (2)	@ Marlins	6–10	Hoeing (1–1)	Alexy (1–1)	—	LoanDepot Park	5,242	61–80	L1
142	September 13	Athletics	8–7	Burke (7–3)	Payamps (3–5)	—	Globe Life Field	14,925	62–80	W1
143	September 14	Athletics	7–8	Cyr (1–0)	Leclerc (0–3)	Acevedo (1)	Globe Life Field	25,700	62–81	L1
144	September 16	@ Rays	4–3	Pérez (12–6)	Kluber (10–9)	Leclerc (6)	Tropicana Field	14,127	63–81	W1
145	September 17	@ Rays	1–5	Yarbrough (2–8)	Gray (7–7)	—	Tropicana Field	14,094	63–82	L1
146	September 18	@ Rays	3–5	Springs (9–4)	Otto (6–9)	Fairbanks (8)	Tropicana Field	12,835	63–83	L2
147	September 20	Angels	2–5	Sandoval (6–9)	Santana (3–8)	Herget (6)	Globe Life Field	19,472	63–84	L3
148	September 21	Angels	7–2	Dunning (4–8)	Davidson (2–7)	—	Globe Life Field	20,959	64–84	W1
149	September 22	Angels	5–3	Moore (5–2)	Quijada (0–5)	Leclerc (7)	Globe Life Field	16,223	65–84	W2
150	September 23	Guardians	3–6	Morris (1–2)	Hearn (6–8)	Clase (38)	Globe Life Field	34,862	65–85	L1
151	September 24	Guardians	2–4	Quantrill (14–5)	Burke (7–4)	Clase (39)	Globe Life Field	28,415	65–86	L2
152	September 25	Guardians	4–10	Civale (3–6)	Ragans (0–3)	—	Globe Life Field	31,845	65–87	L3
153	September 27	@ Mariners	5–0	Miller (1–1)	Ray (12–11)	—	T-Mobile Park	23,221	66–87	W1
154	September 28	@ Mariners	1–3	Kirby (8–4)	Pérez (12–7)	Sewald (20)	T-Mobile Park	21,863	66–88	L1
155	September 29	@ Mariners	9–10 (11)	Flexen (8–9)	King (1–4)	—	T-Mobile Park	21,094	66–89	L2
156	September 30	@ Angels	1–4	Detmers (7–6)	Otto (6–10)	Herget (9)	Angel Stadium	32,939	66–90	L3

October: 2–4 (Home: 2–2; Away: 0–2)

#	Date	Opponent	Score	Win	Loss	Save	Stadium	Attendance	Record	Streak
157	October 1	@ Angels	2–3	Suárez (8–8)	Hernández (2–3)	Tepera (6)	Angel Stadium	32,472	66–91	L4
158	October 2	@ Angels	3–8	Barría (3–3)	Miller (1–2)	—	Angel Stadium	26,041	66–92	L5
159	October 3	Yankees	1–3	Severino (7–3)	Pérez (12–8)	Effross (4)	Globe Life Field	35,906	66–93	L6
160	October 4 (1)	Yankees	4–5	Chapman (4–4)	Burke (7–5)	Loáisiga (2)	Globe Life Field	30,553	66–94	L7
161	October 4 (2)	Yankees	3–2	Allard (1–2)	Cole (13–8)	Moore (4)	Globe Life Field	38,832	67–94	W1
162	October 5	Yankees	4–2	Otto (7–10)	Germán (2–5)	Moore (5)	Globe Life Field	28,056	68–94	W2

== Roster ==
2022 Texas Rangers
Roster
Pitchers: 36 Albert Abreu; 62 A. J. Alexy; 39 Kolby Allard; 35 Kohei Arihara; 68 Joe Barlow; 46 Brock Burke; 51 Matt Bush; 33 Dane Dunning; 22 Jon Gray; 21,52 Taylor Hearn; 72 Jonathan Hernández; 40 Greg Holland; 31 Spencer Howard; 60 Dallas Keuchel; 32 John King; 25 José Leclerc; 59 Brett Martin; 76 Tyson Miller; 45 Matt Moore; 49 Glenn Otto; 61 Spencer Patton; 54 Martín Pérez; 50 Cole Ragans; 43 Garrett Richards; 51 Yerry Rodríguez; 19 Dennis Santana; 66 Josh Sborz; 57 Nick Snyder; 63 Jesús Tinoco	Catchers: 18 Mitch Garver; 28 Jonah Heim; 55 Sam Huff; 23 Kevin Plawecki; 20,60 Meibrys Viloria; Infielders: 11 Charlie Culberson; 70 Ezequiel Durán; 77 Andy Ibáñez; 6 Josh Jung; 30 Nathaniel Lowe; 9 Mark Mathias; 5 Corey Seager; 2 Marcus Semien; 47 Josh H. Smith	Outfielders: 56 Kole Calhoun; 4 Willie Calhoun; 9 Steven Duggar; 53 Adolis García; 38 Elier Hernández; 13 Brad Miller; 65 Zach Reks; 15 Nick Solak; 3 Leody Taveras; 65 Bubba Thompson; 40 Steele Walker; 41 Eli White	Manager: 27 Tony Beasley; 8 Chris Woodward; Coaches: 27 Tony Beasley (third base); 73 Pat Cantwell (bullpen catcher); 86 Seth Conner (assistant hitting); 14 Donnie Ecker (bench); -- Josh Frasier (bullpen catcher); 87 Brett Hayes (bullpen); 75 Tim Hyers (hitting); 84 Josh Johnson (first base); 71 Doug Mathis (pitching); 64 Corey Ragsdale (third base); 85 Brendan Sagara (pitching); 88 Bobby Wilson (catching)

== Player stats ==
=== Batting ===
Note: G = Games played; AB = At bats; R = Runs; H = Hits; 2B = Doubles; 3B = Triples; HR = Home runs; RBI = Runs batted in; SB = Stolen bases; BB = Walks; AVG = Batting average; SLG = Slugging average

Player	G	AB	R	H	2B	3B	HR	RBI	SB	BB	AVG	SLG
Marcus Semien	161	657	101	163	31	5	26	83	25	53	.248	.429
Adolis García	156	605	88	151	34	5	27	101	25	40	.250	.456
Nathaniel Lowe	157	593	74	179	26	3	27	76	2	48	.302	.492
Corey Seager	151	593	91	145	24	1	33	83	3	58	.245	.455
Jonah Heim	127	406	51	92	20	1	16	48	2	41	.227	.399
Kole Calhoun	125	388	36	76	14	1	12	49	3	27	.196	.330
Leody Taveras	99	314	39	82	14	2	5	34	11	21	.261	.366
Brad Miller	81	222	20	47	3	0	7	32	4	18	.212	.320
Josh Smith	73	213	23	42	5	0	2	16	4	28	.197	.249
Ezequiel Durán	58	208	25	49	10	1	5	25	4	12	.236	.365
Mitch Garver	54	188	23	39	7	0	10	24	1	23	.207	.404
Bubba Thompson	55	170	18	45	5	0	1	9	18	7	.265	.312
Sam Huff	44	121	9	29	4	0	4	10	1	11	.240	.372
Andy Ibáñez	40	119	13	26	4	0	1	9	3	9	.218	.277
Charlie Culberson	68	115	19	29	6	0	2	12	2	5	.252	.357
Eli White	47	105	16	21	2	0	3	10	12	11	.200	.305
Josh Jung	26	98	9	20	4	1	5	14	2	4	.204	.418
Nick Solak	35	82	14	17	1	0	3	4	3	7	.207	.329
Mark Mathias	24	65	11	18	3	0	5	16	2	9	.277	.554
Meibrys Viloria	26	63	10	10	1	0	2	5	0	11	.159	.270
Willie Calhoun	18	44	7	6	3	0	1	2	0	8	.136	.273
Zach Reks	16	34	3	9	1	0	0	3	0	0	.265	.294
Elier Hernández	14	33	4	6	2	0	0	3	0	1	.182	.242
Steven Duggar	8	17	2	3	0	0	0	0	1	2	.176	.176
Steele Walker	5	14	1	1	0	0	1	1	0	2	.071	.286
Kevin Plawecki	3	11	0	3	0	0	0	1	0	0	.273	.273
Team totals	162	5478	707	1308	224	20	198	670	128	456	.239	.395

=== Pitching ===
Note: W = Wins; L = Losses; ERA = Earned run average; G = Games pitched; GS = Games started; SV = Saves; IP = Innings pitched; H = Hits allowed; R = Runs allowed; ER = Earned runs allowed; BB = Walks allowed; SO = Strikeouts

Player	W	L	ERA	G	GS	SV	IP	H	R	ER	BB	SO
Martín Pérez	12	8	2.89	32	32	0	196.1	178	70	63	69	169
Dane Dunning	4	8	4.46	29	29	0	153.1	158	80	76	62	137
Glenn Otto	7	10	4.64	27	27	0	135.2	119	74	70	62	107
Jon Gray	7	7	3.96	24	24	0	127.1	105	61	56	39	134
Taylor Hearn	6	8	5.13	31	13	1	100.0	107	60	57	43	97
Brock Burke	7	5	1.97	52	0	0	82.1	63	25	18	24	90
Matt Moore	5	2	1.95	63	0	5	74.0	49	20	16	38	83
Dennis Santana	3	8	5.22	63	1	1	58.2	50	39	34	28	54
John King	1	4	4.03	39	0	0	51.1	61	27	23	14	30
Brett Martin	1	7	4.14	55	1	3	50.0	50	27	23	18	40
José Leclerc	0	3	2.83	39	0	7	47.2	33	17	15	21	54
Garrett Richards	1	1	5.27	32	2	1	42.2	44	28	25	13	36
Cole Ragans	0	3	4.95	9	9	0	40.0	43	24	22	16	27
Spencer Howard	2	4	7.41	10	8	0	37.2	50	33	31	15	32
Matt Bush	2	1	2.95	40	5	1	36.2	27	16	12	10	45
Joe Barlow	3	1	3.86	35	0	13	35.0	27	18	15	13	28
Jonathan Hernández	2	3	2.97	29	0	4	30.1	26	14	10	17	27
Josh Sborz	1	0	6.45	19	1	0	22.1	25	16	16	11	32
Kolby Allard	1	2	7.29	10	0	1	21.0	21	17	17	6	19
Jesús Tinoco	0	0	2.18	17	2	0	20.2	12	5	5	10	18
Kohei Arihara	1	3	9.45	5	4	0	20.0	36	22	21	11	14
Tyson Miller	1	2	10.97	4	2	0	10.2	16	14	13	8	8
Dallas Keuchel	0	2	12.60	2	2	0	10.0	18	14	14	4	7
Albert Abreu	0	0	3.12	7	0	0	8.2	4	3	3	12	9
Spencer Patton	0	0	3.86	7	0	0	7.0	4	3	3	3	5
A. J. Alexy	1	1	11.57	4	0	0	7.0	10	9	9	9	6
Greg Holland	0	1	7.71	5	0	0	4.2	6	5	4	1	5
Charlie Culberson	0	0	0.00	2	0	0	2.0	1	0	0	1	0
Nick Snyder	0	0	18.00	2	0	0	1.0	1	2	2	3	0
Yerry Rodríguez	0	0	0.00	1	0	0	1.0	1	0	0	0	1
Team totals	68	94	4.22	162	162	37	1435.0	1345	743	673	581	1314

== Farm system ==
Level	Team	League	Manager
Triple-A	Round Rock Express	Pacific Coast League	
Double-A	Frisco RoughRiders	Texas League	
High-A	Hickory Crawdads	South Atlantic League	
Low-A	Down East Wood Ducks	Carolina League	
Rookie	ACL Rangers	Arizona Complex League	
Foreign Rookie	DSL Rangers 1	Dominican Summer League	
Foreign Rookie	DSL Rangers 2	Dominican Summer League	
