= List of Texas Rangers managers =

The Texas Rangers are an American baseball franchise based in Arlington, Texas. They are members of the American League West division. The Rangers franchise was formed in 1961, then called the Washington Senators, as a member of the American League. In its 62-year history, the Texas Rangers baseball franchise of Major League Baseball's American League has employed 28 managers. The duties of the team manager include team strategy and leadership on and off the field.

Mickey Vernon became the first manager of the then Washington Senators in 1961, serving for just over two seasons. Ron Washington has managed more games and seasons than any other manager in Rangers history. Before 2010, the only Rangers manager to have led the team to the playoffs was Johnny Oates, who also won the 1996 Manager of the Year Award with the Rangers. Ted Williams is the only Rangers manager to have been inducted into the Baseball Hall of Fame as a player; Whitey Herzog, who was inducted in the Hall in 2010, is only Rangers manager to earn induction as a manager.

In 1963, manager Mickey Vernon was fired and replaced by interim manager Eddie Yost. One game later, Yost was replaced by Gil Hodges. In 1973, Whitey Herzog was replaced by Del Wilber. One game later, Billy Martin took over the role of manager. In 1975, Frank Lucchesi took over for Martin in midseason, who in turn was replaced by Eddie Stanky. After six games, Connie Ryan could not finish the season, so Billy Hunter took over the role of manager, only to be fired with one game to go in the 1978 season and replaced by Pat Corrales. In 1982, Don Zimmer was fired as Rangers manager but continued to run the team for three more games before being replaced by Darrell Johnson. Rangers owner Eddie Chiles said the poor play of the Rangers had nothing to do with Zimmer's firing but was instead 'something personal'. In 1985, after Doug Rader led the Rangers to two losing seasons, he was replaced by Bobby Valentine, who in turn was replaced by Toby Harrah during midseason. In 2001, Johnny Oates' poor health forced the Rangers to hire Jerry Narron as his midseason replacement. Buck Showalter was hired as manager of the Texas Rangers following a last-place 2002 season under Narron. Showalter managed the Rangers through the 2006 season. Ron Washington next managed the team from 2007 to 2014, longer than any other person in the franchise's history, when he announced his resignation on September 5, 2014. Tim Bogar managed the rest of the season on an interim basis. Jeff Banister was hired to lead the team from 2015 to September 21, 2018, when he was fired. Don Wakamatsu replaced him as interim manager. Chris Woodward was later hired as the new manager for 2019. He was dismissed on August 15, 2022, and third base coach Tony Beasley finished the season as interim manager. The Rangers then hired Bruce Bochy, who had won three championships with the San Francisco Giants and had initially retired in 2019, to manage the team starting in 2023, leading to the franchise's first title in the 2023 World Series.

== Key ==
No.	A running total of the number of Senators/Rangers managers
Season(s)	The first and last seasons the manager led the team. Each year is linked to an article about that particular team season.
G	Regular season games managed
W	Regular season wins
L	Regular season losses
Win %	Winning percentage
PA	Playoff appearances: number of years the manager has led the franchise to the playoffs
PW	Playoff wins
PL	Playoff losses
LC	League championships: number of league championships, or pennants, achieved by the manager
WS	World Series championships: number of World Series victories achieved by the manager
*	Inducted into the Baseball Hall of Fame

== Managers ==
No.	Image	Manager	Season(s)	G	W	L	Win %	PA	PW	PL	LC	WS	Notes	Ref(s).
1		Mickey Vernon	1961–1963	362	135	227	.373	—	—	—	—	—	—	
2		Eddie Yost	1963	1	0	1	.000	—	—	—	—	—	—	
3		Gil Hodges*	1963–1967	765	321	444	.420	—	—	—	—	—	—	
4		Jim Lemon	1968	161	65	96	.404	—	—	—	—	—	—	
5		Ted Williams*	1969–1972	637	273	364	.429	—	—	—	—	—	—	
6		Whitey Herzog*	1973	138	47	91	.341	—	—	—	—	—	—	
7		Del Wilber	1973	1	1	0	1.000	—	—	—	—	—	—	
8		Billy Martin	1973–1975	278	137	141	.493	—	—	—	—	—	—	
9		Frank Lucchesi	1975–1977	291	142	149	.488	—	—	—	—	—	—	
10		Eddie Stanky	1977	1	1	0	1.000	—	—	—	—	—	—	
11		Connie Ryan	1977	6	2	4	.333	—	—	—	—	—	—	
12		Billy Hunter	1977–1978	254	146	108	.575	—	—	—	—	—	—	
13		Pat Corrales	1978–1980	324	160	164	.494	—	—	—	—	—	—	
14		Don Zimmer	1981–1982	201	95	106	.473	—	—	—	—	—	—	
15		Darrell Johnson	1982	66	26	40	.394	—	—	—	—	—	—	
16		Doug Rader	1983–1985	355	155	200	.437	—	—	—	—	—	—	
17		Bobby Valentine	1985–1992	1,186	581	605	.490	—	—	—	—	—	—	
18		Toby Harrah	1992	76	32	44	.421	—	—	—	—	—	—	
19		Kevin Kennedy	1993–1994	276	138	138	.500	—	—	—	—	—	—	
20		Johnny Oates	1995–2001	982	506	476	.515	3	1	9	—	—	1996 AL Manager of the Year	
21		Jerry Narron	2001–2002	296	134	162	.453	—	—	—	—	—	—	
22		Buck Showalter	2003–2006	648	319	329	.492	—	—	—	—	—	2004 AL Manager of the Year	
23		Ron Washington	2007–2014	1,275	664	611	.521	3	18	16	2	—	—	
24		Tim Bogar	2014	22	14	8	.636	—	—	—	—	—	—	
25		Jeff Banister	2015–2018	638	325	313	.509	2	2	6	—	—	2015 AL Manager of the Year	
26		Don Wakamatsu	2018	10	3	7	.300	—	—	—	—	—	—	
27		Chris Woodward	2019–2022	498	211	287	.424	—	—	—	—	—	—	
28		Tony Beasley	2022	48	17	31	.354	—	—	—	—	—	—	
29		Bruce Bochy	2023–2025	486	249	237	.512	1	13	4	1	1	—	
30		Skip Schumaker	2026–present	162	80	82	.465	—	—	—	—	—	—	
Totals		30 managers	63 seasons	10,120	4,821	5,299	.476	9	34	35	3	1	—	—

Statistics current through the end of the 2025 season
