= Mike Maddux =

American baseball player and coach (born 1961)

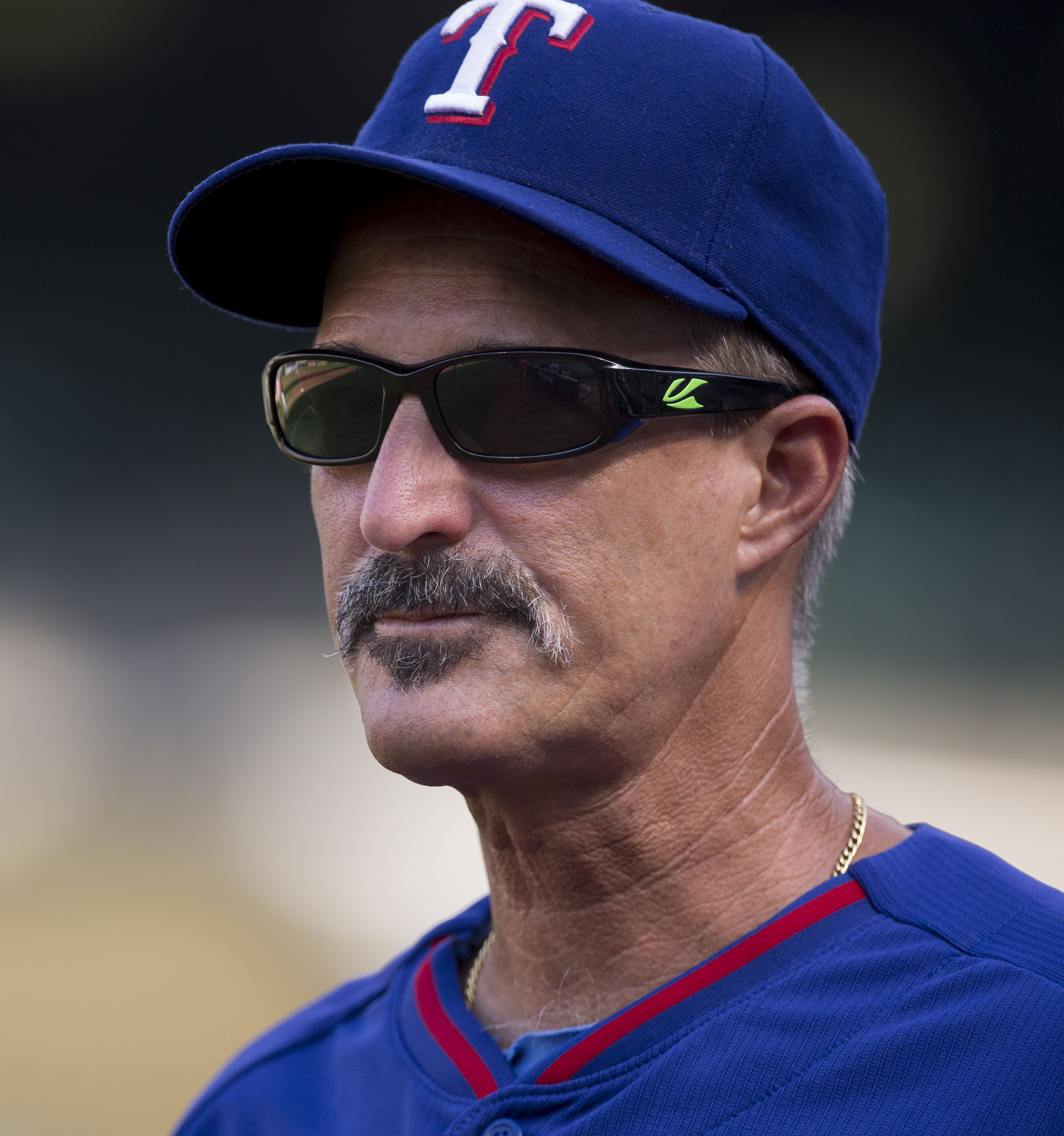
- Maddux with the Texas Rangers in 2014
- Pitcher / Pitching coach
- Born: August 27, 1961 (age 65); Dayton, Ohio, U.S.
- Batted: Left Threw: Right

MLB debut
- June 3, 1986, for the Philadelphia Phillies

Last MLB appearance
- July 4, 2000, for the Houston Astros

MLB statistics
- Win–loss record: 39–37
- Earned run average: 4.05
- Strikeouts: 564
- Stats at Baseball Reference

Teams
- As player: Philadelphia Phillies (1986–1989); Los Angeles Dodgers (1990); San Diego Padres (1991–1992); New York Mets (1993–1994); Pittsburgh Pirates (1995); Boston Red Sox (1995–1996); Seattle Mariners (1997); Montreal Expos (1998–1999); Los Angeles Dodgers (1999); Houston Astros (2000); As coach: Milwaukee Brewers (2003–2008); Texas Rangers (2009–2015); Washington Nationals (2016–2017); St. Louis Cardinals (2018–2022); Texas Rangers (2023–2025); Los Angeles Angels (2026)

Career highlights and awards
- World Series champion (2023)

Michael Ausley Maddux (born August 27, 1961) is an American professional baseball coach and former pitcher. He most recently served as the pitching coach for the Los Angeles Angels of Major League Baseball (MLB). He played in MLB for nine teams over 15 seasons and has coached for five teams following his playing career.

Maddux played in MLB from 1986 through 2000 for the Philadelphia Phillies, Los Angeles Dodgers, San Diego Padres, New York Mets, Pittsburgh Pirates, Boston Red Sox, Seattle Mariners, Montreal Expos, and Houston Astros. Except for the Phillies, for whom he played during the first four seasons of his career, he never played more than two seasons for any team.

Maddux has served as pitching coach for the Milwaukee Brewers, Texas Rangers, Washington Nationals, and St. Louis Cardinals. Teams that hired him subsequently allowed fewer runs to score. While he coached for the Rangers, the pitching staff posted season earned run averages (ERA) lower than 4.00 for the first time since 1990, doing so for four consecutive seasons. The Nationals hired him after the 2015 season, and the Cardinals hired him after the 2017 season. He is the older brother of Hall of Fame pitcher Greg Maddux.

== Early life ==
Maddux was born in Dayton, Ohio, in 1961 to Dave and Linda Maddux. His father, Dave, served in the United States Air Force. The family moved to Taiwan when Mike was a toddler, and also spent time living in San Angelo, Texas, North Dakota, California, Madrid, Indiana, and eventually Las Vegas, Nevada. Mike's younger brother, Greg, was born in San Angelo in 1966. Beginning at the age of ten, Maddux received instruction in pitching from former Major League Baseball scout Ralph Meder.

== Playing career ==
Maddux attended Rancho High School in Las Vegas. The Cincinnati Reds selected him in the 36th round of the 1979 Major League Baseball draft, but he did not sign with the Reds. He enrolled at the University of Texas at El Paso (UTEP), where he played college baseball for the UTEP Miners.

The Philadelphia Phillies selected him in the fifth round of the 1982 MLB draft. He began the 1986 season with the Portland Beavers of the Class AAA Pacific Coast League, and was promoted to the major leagues on May 30. He had a 7.84 earned run average (ERA) in five starts and was demoted to Portland on July 4. After pitching to a 2.09 ERA in five starts, the Phillies recalled him on August 1. On September 29, he started a game against his brother Greg, who was also a rookie, pitching for the Chicago Cubs. The Cubs defeated the Phillies. After the 1989 season, the Phillies released Maddux, and he signed with the Los Angeles Dodgers. Granted free agency after the 1990 season, he contacted each team in seeking a tryout, which resulted in the San Diego Padres signing him. Maddux won a spot with the Padres as a relief pitcher. After the 1992 season, the Padres traded Maddux to the New York Mets for Roger Mason and Mike Freitas. He signed a two-year contract with the Mets, worth $2.375 million.

Granted free agency after the 1994 season, Maddux signed with the Pittsburgh Pirates. The Pirates released him on May 16. He signed with the Boston Red Sox on May 30, and then re-signed with the Red Sox as a free agent that offseason. The Red Sox released Maddux before the 1997 season, and he signed with the Seattle Mariners, who released him on July 23. The Padres signed him on August 19, but he did not pitch in the majors for the Padres that year. A free agent again, Maddux signed with the Montreal Expos, who released him on April 15, 1999. On April 24, he signed with the Dodgers. He signed with the Houston Astros for the 2000 season, but pitched to a 6.26 ERA and was released on July 5. During a 15-year baseball career, Maddux compiled 39 wins, 564 strikeouts, and a 4.05 ERA.

== Coaching career ==
=== Early coaching career ===
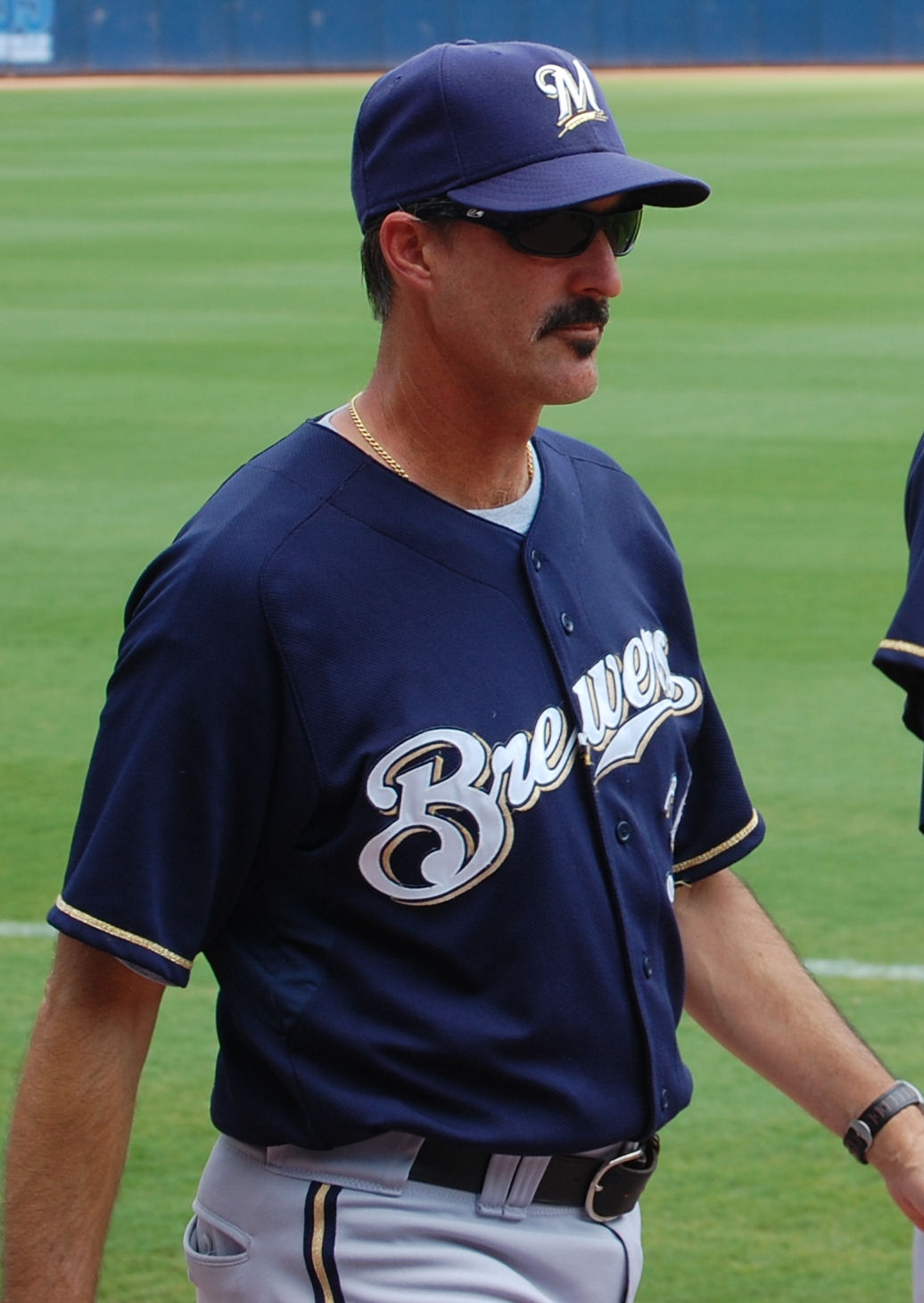
Maddux with the Brewers in 2008

After he retired as a player, Maddux became a pitching coach in Minor League Baseball for the Houston Astros organization, first with the Round Rock Express. Beginning in 2003, Maddux spent six seasons as the pitching coach for the major league Milwaukee Brewers. During this time, the Brewers yielded an average of 77 fewer runs per season than they had in the previous seven. Pitcher CC Sabathia had his lone sub-3.00-ERA half-season in Milwaukee.

=== Texas Rangers ===
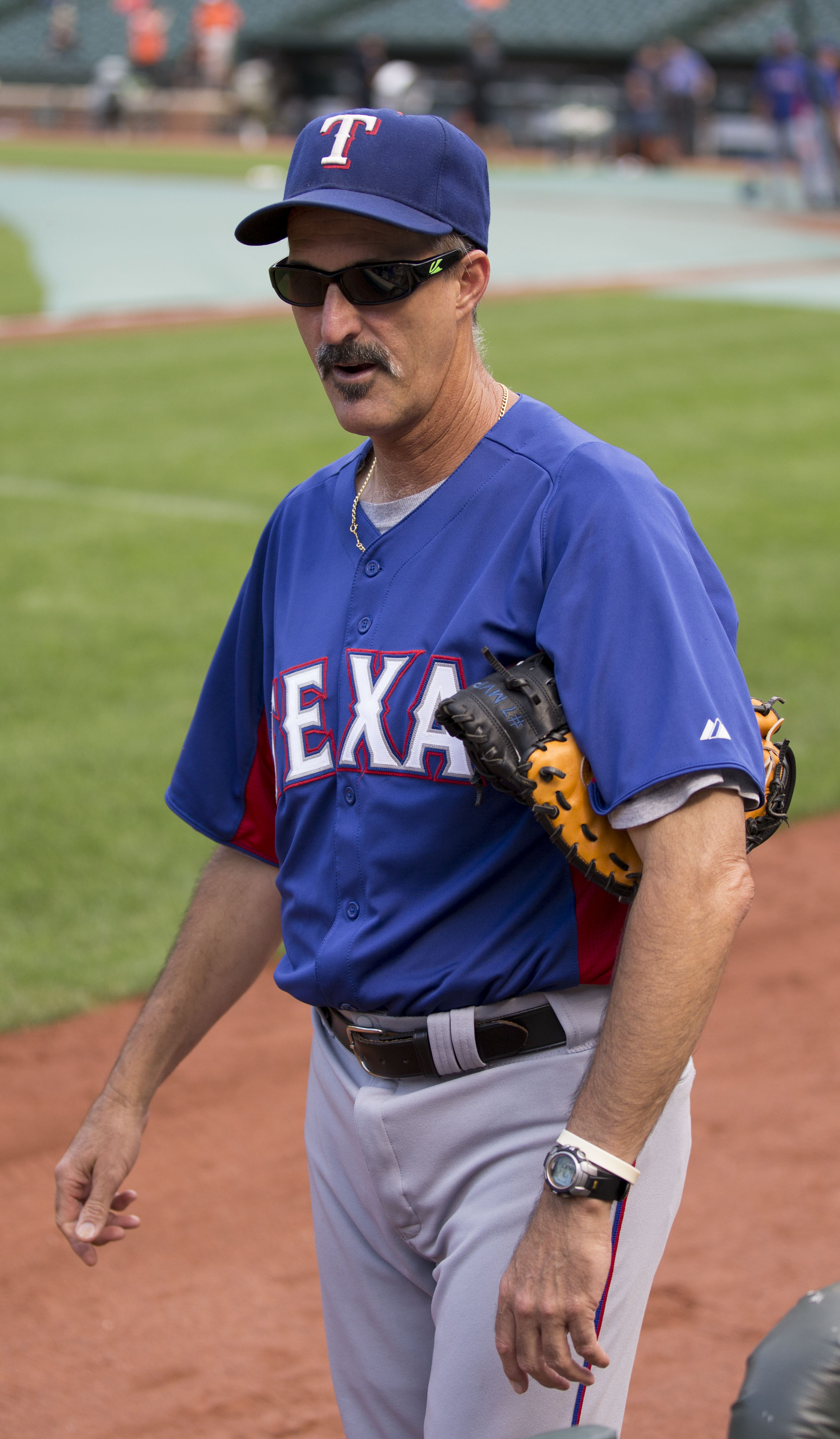
Maddux coaching with the Rangers in 2013

The Texas Rangers hired Maddux as their pitching coach before the 2009 season. In an early conversation, then-president and former Rangers pitcher Nolan Ryan said he wanted to change the culture and perception that pitching for the Rangers was extremely difficult. "Do it, or else" was the challenge he gave Maddux. In 2008, the Rangers' pitching staff produced a 5.37 ERA, the worst in the American League (AL), and from 2000–08, also produced an AL-worst 5.14 ERA. The Rangers had not completed a season with a team ERA below 4.00 since 1990, and in 15 seasons playing at Globe Life Park in Arlington, their ERA was 5.04. In the previous 11 seasons before his arrival, they had given up 888 runs a season.

After his first season as pitching coach with Texas, the club's ERA dropped nearly one full run (0.99). In 2011, when the Rangers went to the World Series for the second consecutive season, they lacked star pitching. The rotation was composed primarily of C. J. Wilson, with a 6.02 ERA when Maddux arrived; Colby Lewis, who had just pitched in Nippon Professional Baseball in Japan; Scott Feldman, and Tommy Hunter. During Maddux's time with the Rangers, the club won 612 games, third-most in the AL, and achieved a collective ERA of 4.04, including four consecutive seasons below 4.00. From 2010–13, their ERA was 3.83, third-lowest in the AL. They trimmed the average number of runs allowed in his six years to 707. Five pitchers became All-Stars in Maddux's tenure: Yu Darvish, Neftalí Feliz, Matt Harrison, Alexi Ogando, and Wilson. The Rangers reached the postseason four times and won two AL pennants.

During the 2011 offseason, the Cubs fired Mike Quade as their manager and considered Maddux as a potential replacement. He was also considered for the Red Sox managerial position, but he withdrew himself from consideration. In 2014, he was a candidate to manage the Astros after they fired Bo Porter.

When Jeff Banister became the Rangers' manager during the 2014–15 offseason, Maddux agreed to stay with the Rangers for one more season. His contract with the Rangers expired after the 2015 season and they discussed a new contract. Maddux explored options with other teams while the Rangers considered hiring a successor. The Rangers decided to hire a candidate from their interviews rather than making Maddux a formal offer.

=== Washington Nationals ===
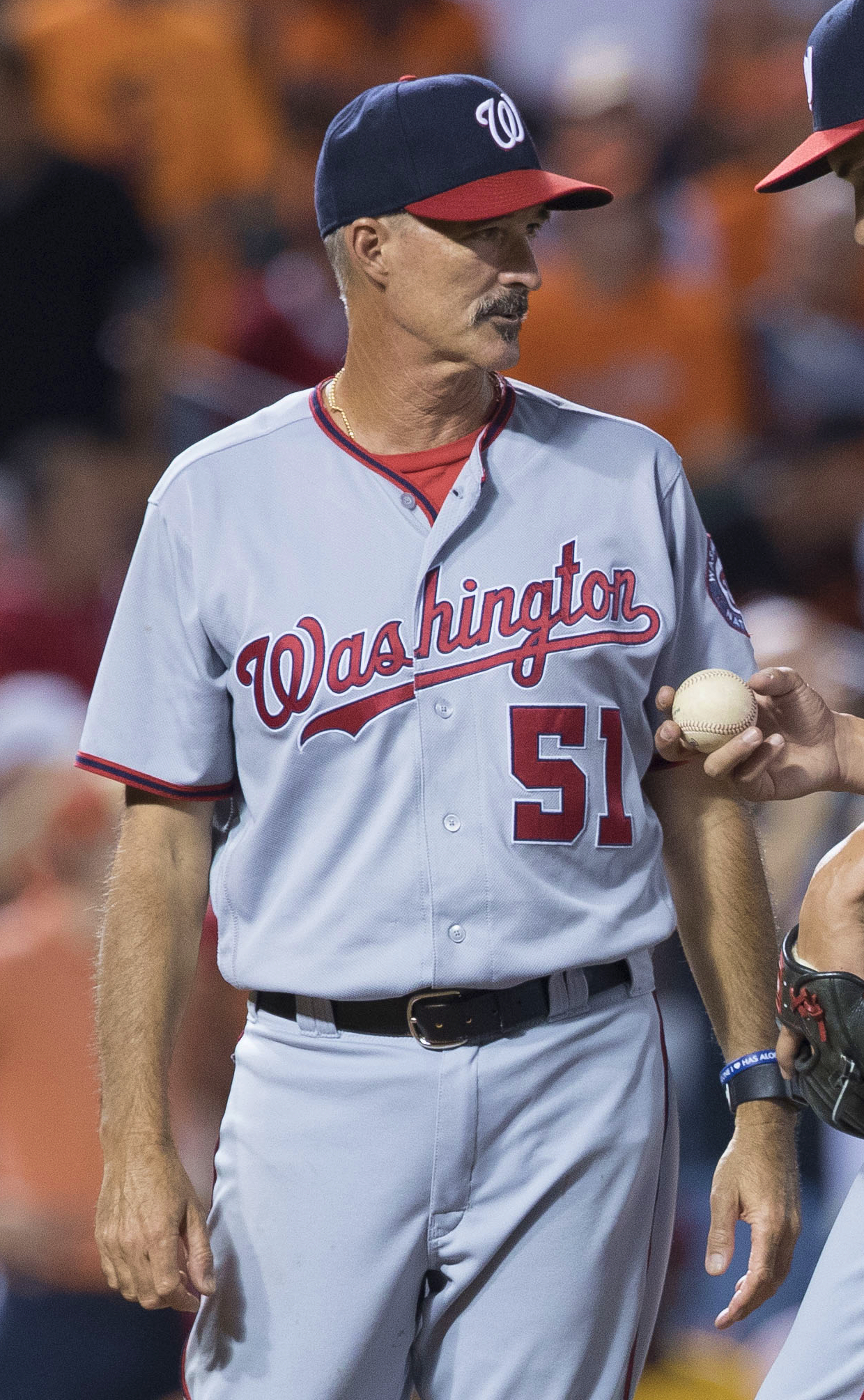
Maddux with the Nationals in 2016

The Washington Nationals signed Maddux with a two-year contract to become their pitching coach on November 4, 2015. On October 20, 2017, his contract was not renewed.

=== St. Louis Cardinals ===
On October 26, 2017, the St. Louis Cardinals hired Maddux as their pitching coach. Maddux left the Cardinals after the 2022 season.

=== Texas Rangers (second stint) ===
On November 23, 2022, Maddux was named the pitching coach for the Rangers. He coached the team as they won the 2023 World Series.

=== Los Angeles Angels ===
On October 31, 2025, the Los Angeles Angels hired Maddux to serve as the team's new pitching coach. On August 11, 2026, Maddux was fired by the Angels alongside Darryl Scott and Dom Chiti.

== Personal life ==
Maddux and his wife, Lise, have two daughters, Makayla and Lexie. They own a house in Tarrant County, Texas.
