= Josh Johnson (baseball coach) =

American baseball coach (born 1986)

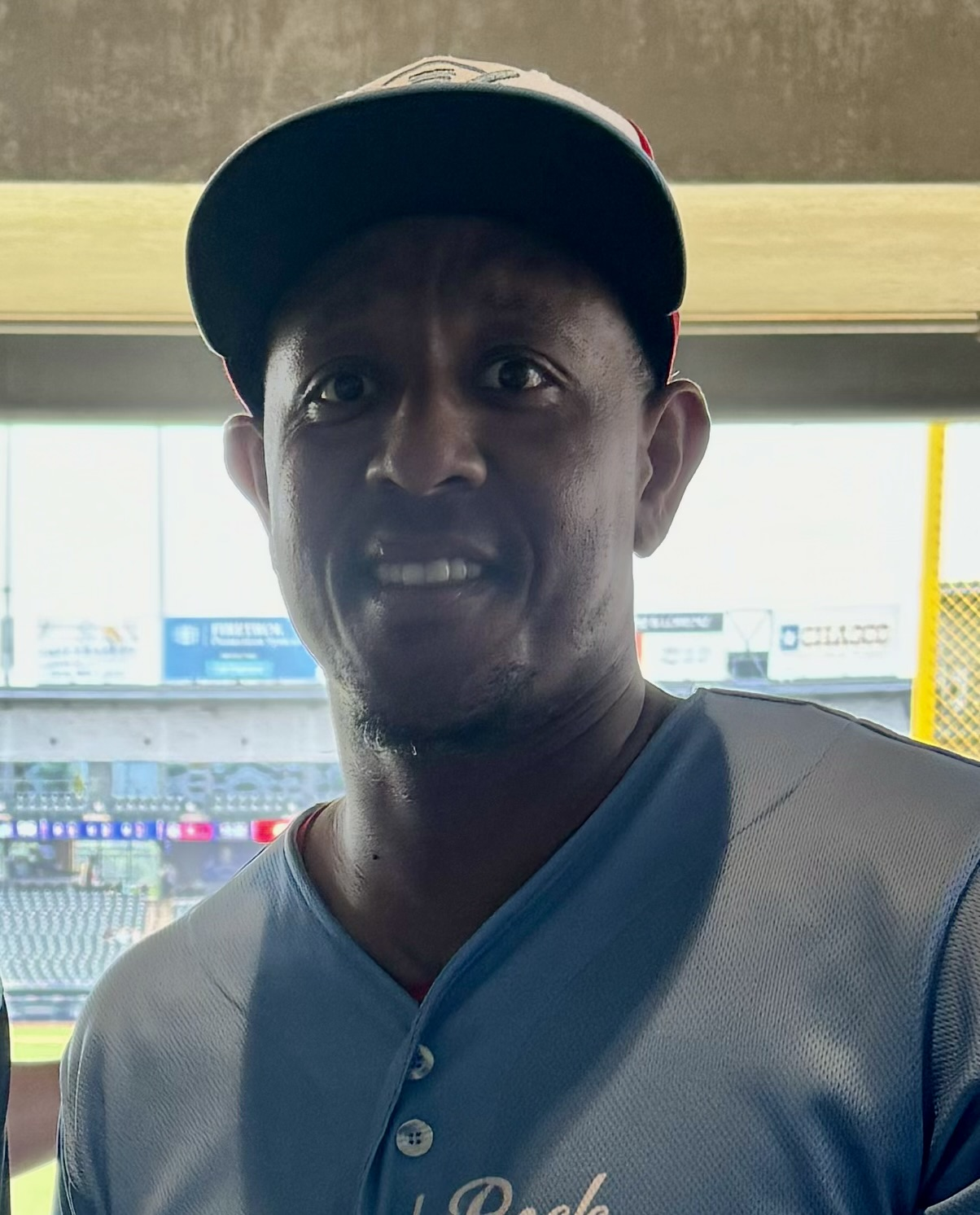
- Johnson in 2024
- Coach
- Born: January 11, 1986 (age 40); Tampa, Florida, U.S.
- Bats: Switch Throws: Right
- Stats at Baseball Reference

Teams
- As coach: San Diego Padres (2018); Texas Rangers (2022)

Joshua Rashaad Johnson (born January 11, 1986) is an American professional baseball former infielder and current coach in the Texas Rangers organization. He was previously a coach in Major League Baseball (MLB) for the San Diego Padres and Texas Rangers.

== Playing career ==
Johnson attended George S. Middleton High School in Tampa, Florida. The Kansas City Royals selected Johnson in the third round of the 2004 MLB draft. Johnson spent the 2003-2009 seasons in the Kansas City minor league system, before being released after the 2009 season. He signed with the Washington Nationals and spent the 2010-2015 seasons in the Washington system.

== Coaching career ==
After the 2015 season, the Nationals hired Johnson as the manager of the Gulf Coast Nationals, and he spent the 2016 and 2017 seasons in that role.

The Padres hired Johnson as the infield coach on their major league staff for the 2018 season. Johnson was let go from his job after just one season.

Johnson joined the Texas Rangers organization in 2019, as a coach for the Hickory Crawdads of the Single–A South Atlantic League. He was named the manager of the Down East Wood Ducks of the High–A Carolina League prior to the 2020 season, but did not due to the cancellation of the 2020 Minor League Baseball season because of the COVID-19 pandemic. He returned to Hickory as their manager for the 2021 season. Johnson spent the 2022 season as the development coach for the Round Rock Express.

On August 15, 2022, Johnson was named the Rangers first base coach after manager Chris Woodward was fired and Corey Ragsdale was moved to third base coach. Johnson was removed from the role following the season on October 6, and was reassigned to an undetermined on–the–field minor league player development position.

== Personal life ==
Johnson's father, Larry Johnson, played in Major League Baseball.
