= Dom Chiti =

American baseball coach (born 1958)

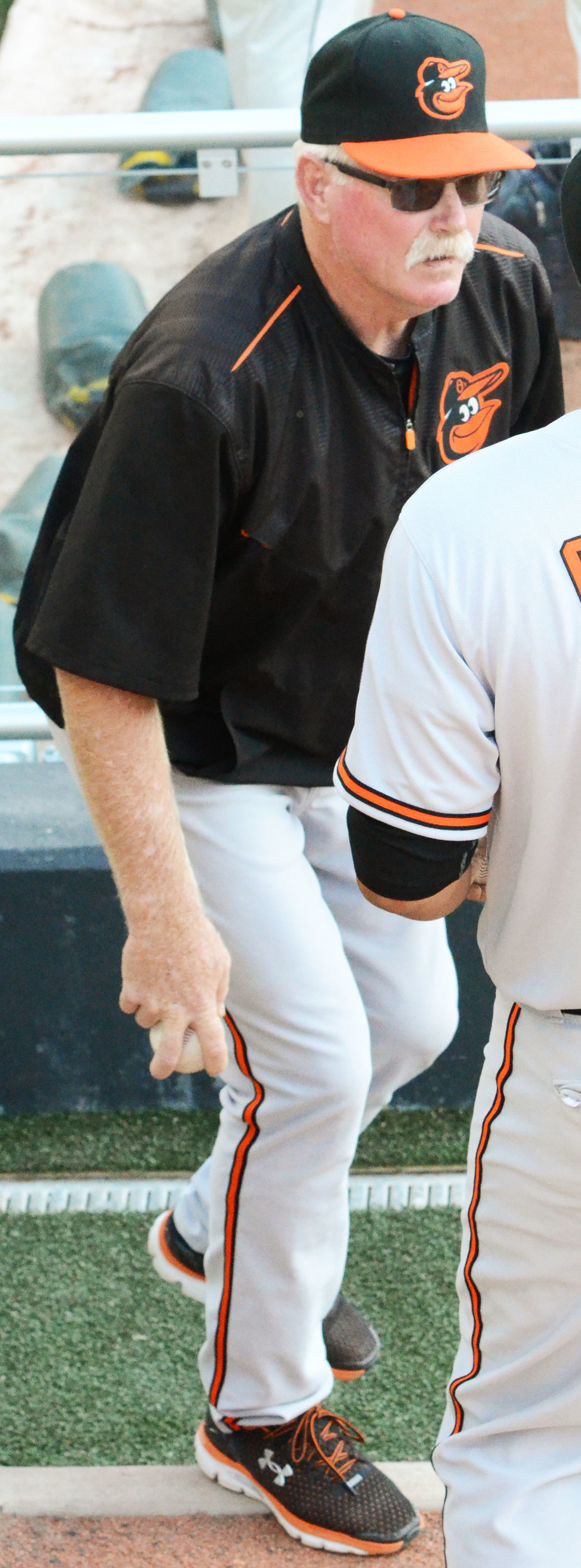
- Chiti with the Baltimore Orioles in 2015
- Coach
- Born: December 10, 1958 (age 67); Independence, Missouri, U.S.
- Bats: Left Throws: Left
- Stats at Baseball Reference

Teams
- Cleveland Indians (1990–1993); Texas Rangers (2006–2008); Baltimore Orioles (2014–2016); Los Angeles Angels (2021–2022); New York Mets (2023); Los Angeles Angels (2026)

Harry Dominic Chiti (/ˈtʃiːtiː/ CHEE-tee; born December 10, 1958) is an American former professional baseball player, coach, scout and farm system official who most recently served as the bullpen coach for the Los Angeles Angels of Major League Baseball (MLB). He has previously been the bullpen coach of the Cleveland Indians, Baltimore Orioles, New York Mets, Texas Rangers, and Angels in MLB. He is a former left-handed pitcher in the minor leagues.

== Playing career ==
Chiti was born in Independence, Missouri, the son of former major league catcher Harry Chiti. A high school All-American, Chiti was a second-round selection of the Atlanta Braves in the 1976 draft out of Raleigh-Egypt High School, Memphis, Tennessee. He started his professional career with the Kingsport Braves in 1976, and the following year he was named to the Western Carolinas League All-Star team as a member of Class A Greenwood Braves. However, he suffered serious arm problems late in the 1978 season and never rose higher than the Double-A level. After leaving the Atlanta system, Chiti also played in the Orioles' organization in 1981 before retiring as a player.

== Coaching career ==
Chiti started his coaching career in 1982 with the Texas Rangers organization. He also worked as a coach or a scout in the Baltimore and Cleveland systems and coached in the Venezuelan Winter League in 1995 for Caribes team. Chiti returned to the Rangers in 2002. After serving as a special assistant to the general manager in 2002–2003, for the next two years, he served as director of player personnel. 2006 marked his first season as the Rangers bullpen coach.

In October 2006, the Rangers signed Ron Washington as their new manager for the 2007 season. Washington kept Chiti as the bullpen coach, as well as the hitting coach Rudy Jaramillo and pitching coach Mark Connor. Former Oakland manager Art Howe joined the staff as bench coach, although his contract was not renewed at the end of the disappointing 2008 season.

On November 8, 2013, Chiti was hired as bullpen coach for the Baltimore Orioles replacing interim coach Scott McGregor. Chiti left the Orioles organization in November 2016 after he did not receive a new contract from the team and was hired to join the Atlanta Braves front office as the director of pitching. According to Chiti, he reached out to Orioles executive vice president Dan Duquette on multiple occasions after the season to discuss his future with the team although his calls went unreturned.

In 2019, Chiti was hired to replace Dave Trembley as director of player development, but was reassigned in December of the same year.

In 2020, Chiti was hired as special assistant to the general manager for the Los Angeles Angels Perry Minasian. During the 2021 season, Chiti was named the bullpen coach initially on an interim basis replacing Matt Wise, who was promoted to pitching coach following Mickey Callaway's suspension due to an investigation of Callaway's alleged sexual misconduct. On June 26, 2022, during a game against the Seattle Mariners, Chiti was suspended by MLB for five games following a bench-clearing brawl when he held onto a Mariners player. Following the 2022 season, Chiti was reassigned within the Angels organization.

Chiti was hired by the New York Mets on December 20, 2022, to be the bullpen coach. This marked the first time since 2016 where Chiti would be paired again with Buck Showalter following Showalter's hiring as the manager of the Mets before the 2022 season.

On October 23, 2023, Chiti rejoined the Angels organization as their minor league pitching coordinator. In 2026, Chiti returned to the majors as the Angels' bullpen coach. On August 11, 2026, Chiti was fired alongside Mike Maddux and Darryl Scott.

Preceded by Scott McGregor (interim)	Baltimore Orioles bullpen coach 2014–2016	Succeeded by Alan Mills
Preceded by Craig Bjornson	New York Mets bullpen coach 2023	Succeeded by José Rosado
