= Brett Martin =

Brett Martin may refer to:

- Brett Martin (baseball) (born 1995), American professional baseball pitcher
- Brett Martin (squash player) (born 1963), Australian professional squash player
