= Steve Foster (baseball) =

American baseball player and coach (born 1966)

- Pitcher
- Born: August 16, 1966 (age 59); Dallas, Texas, U.S.
- Batted: Right Threw: Right

MLB debut
- August 22, 1991, for the Cincinnati Reds

Last MLB appearance
- June 26, 1993, for the Cincinnati Reds

MLB statistics
- Win–loss record: 3–3
- Earned run average: 2.41
- Strikeouts: 61
- Stats at Baseball Reference

Teams
- As player: Cincinnati Reds (1991–1993); As coach: Florida Marlins (2007–2009); Kansas City Royals (2010–2012); Colorado Rockies (2015–2021)

Steven Eugene Foster Jr. (born August 16, 1966) is an American former professional baseball player and coach. He played in Major League Baseball (MLB) as a right-handed pitcher for the Cincinnati Reds from 1991 to 1993. Foster was the pitching coach for the Colorado Rockies from 2015 to 2021. Following the 2021 season, Foster took a different position with the Rockies—director of pitching—to spend more time with his family.

== High school and college ==
Foster was born in Dallas, Texas and attended DeSoto High School in DeSoto, Texas, where he played football, basketball as well as baseball. He amassed a 44–4 record and twice earned All-State honors pitching at DeSoto High, and led his team to the second State Championship in school history in his senior year. He attended nearby Blinn College for a year before transferring to the University of Texas at Arlington. He earned Southland Conference Pitcher of the Year honors for UTA in 1988. He also earned a Bachelor of Science degree from the University of Wisconsin-Stevens Point in 1998 while serving as an assistant coach with the baseball team (1997–1998).

== Cincinnati Reds ==
He was drafted by the Cincinnati Reds in the twelfth round of the 1988 Major League Baseball draft, and went 9–21 with a 2.80 earned run average and 72 saves over four seasons in their farm system to earn a call to Cincinnati in August 1991. He gave up three earned runs in fourteen innings over the remainder of the season. Foster began the 1992 season with the Reds, but was optioned back to the triple A Nashville Sounds in the beginning of May. He pitched exceptionally once he returned, going 0–1 with a 2.13 ERA and two saves. The one loss came in his one career start against the New York Mets.

He began the 1993 season as Rob Dibble's set-up man, but began experiencing arm trouble toward the end of May. In one of the most notoriously strange baseball injuries, Foster landed on the disabled list with an inflammation of his right shoulder after a segment on The Tonight Show with Jay Leno in which he threw baseballs at milk bottles.

After a monthlong trip to the DL, Foster returned for one appearance in June. After which, it was learned that Foster had detached cartilage in his right shoulder and would be out for the rest of the season. He had surgery, and began a rehab assignment with the Reds in Spring of 1994. After suffering numerous setbacks, he had a second surgery in August. After three brief appearances with the Chattanooga Lookouts, his career was over.

== Coaching ==
After his playing career, Foster worked as a scout with the Tampa Bay Rays in 1996. He spent two years at the University of Michigan coaching a baseball camp for college students before returning to the Rays as a scout in 1999 & 2000. In 2001, he began managing the Wisconsin Woodchucks of the Northwoods Collegiate Summer Baseball League. Following the 2003 season, he resigned to become youth pastor at Highland Community Church in Wausau, Wisconsin.

Foster returned to baseball in 2005 as pitching coach for the Florida Marlins' Class A South Atlantic League affiliate, the Greensboro Grasshoppers. After two seasons as a minor league coach, Foster became bullpen coach for the Florida Marlins from 2007 to 2009, moving briefly into the pitching coach job toward the end of the 2007 season. On October 9, 2009, Foster declined the team's contract offer for the 2010 season. Shortly afterwards, he joined the Kansas City Royals organization. The Royals bullpen, ranked second to last in the majors in 2009 with a 5.02 ERA, showed modest improvement each season since Foster grabbed the reigns (4.49 ERA in 2010, 3.75 in 2011).

On November 4, 2014, he was hired as the pitching coach for the Colorado Rockies. On October 26, 2021, it was announced that Foster would be named the Rockies director of pitching, replacing incumbent Mark Wiley.

== Personal life ==
Foster is a devout Christian who, while serving as youth pastor at Highland Community Church, took the youth group on a missionary trip to the Dominican Republic. He and his wife, Cori, live in Frisco, Texas, and have two children.

Preceded by Mike Harkey	Florida Marlins Bullpen Coach; 2007–2009	Succeeded by Reid Cornelius
Preceded by John Mizerock	Kansas City Royals Bullpen Coach; 2010–2012	Succeeded by Doug Henry
Preceded by Jim Wright	Colorado Rockies Pitching Coach; 2015–2021	Succeeded by Darryl Scott
