= Fernando Hernández (baseball, born 1971) =

Dominican baseball player

- Pitcher
- Born: June 16, 1971 (age 54); Santiago, Dominican Republic
- Batted: Right Threw: Right

Professional debut
- MLB: April 3, 1997, for the Detroit Tigers
- KBO: April 5, 2001, for the SK Wyverns
- CPBL: March 22, 2006, for the Macoto Cobras

Last appearance
- MLB: April 5, 1997, for the Detroit Tigers
- KBO: May 9, 2002, for the Lotte Giants
- CPBL: April 18, 2006, for the Macoto Cobras

MLB statistics
- Win–loss record: 0–0
- Earned run average: 40.50
- Strikeouts: 2

KBO statistics
- Win–loss record: 14–13
- Earned run average: 3.89
- Strikeouts: 215

CPBL statistics
- Win–loss record: 0–3
- Earned run average: 7.43
- Strikeouts: 6
- Stats at Baseball Reference

Teams
- Detroit Tigers (1997); SK Wyverns (2001); Lotte Giants (2002); Macoto Cobras (2006)

Fernando Hernández (born June 16, 1971) is a Dominican former professional baseball pitcher. He played in Major League Baseball (MLB) for the Detroit Tigers, in the KBO League for the SK Wyverns and Lotte Giants, and in the Chinese Professional Baseball League (CPBL) for the Macoto Cobras.

== Personal life ==
His son, Jonathan Hernández, is also a professional baseball player, and won the 2023 World Series with the Texas Rangers.
