= Darryl Scott =

American baseball player and coach (born 1968)

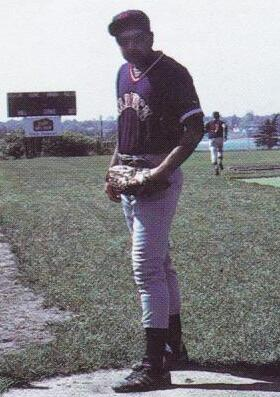
- Scott with the Harwich Mariners in 1988
- Pitcher / Coach
- Born: August 6, 1968 (age 58); Fresno, California, U.S.
- Batted: Right Threw: Right

Professional debut
- MLB: May 31, 1993, for the California Angels
- NPB: April 13, 1994, for the Yokohama BayStars

Last appearance
- MLB: October 1, 1993, for the California Angels
- NPB: August 16, 1994, for the Yokohama BayStars

MLB statistics
- Win–loss record: 1–2
- Earned run average: 5.85
- Strikeouts: 13

NPB statistics
- Win–loss record: 0–1
- Earned run average: 2.51
- Strikeouts: 27
- Stats at Baseball Reference

Teams
- As player: California Angels (1993); Yokohama BayStars (1994); As coach: Colorado Rockies (2020–2025); Los Angeles Angels (2026)

Darryl Nelson Scott (born August 6, 1968) is an American former professional baseball pitcher and pitching coach who most recently served as an assistant pitching coach for the Los Angeles Angels of Major League Baseball (MLB). He played professionally for the California Angels and in Nippon Professional Baseball (NPB) for the Yokohama BayStars.

== High school and college ==
Scott was born in Fresno, California, and took up pitching when he was nine. Scott attended high school at Yuba City High School in Yuba City, California and pitched for their baseball team. He was recruited out of high school by Loyola Marymount University. He pitched for three years for the Loyola Marymount Lions, and during the 1988 season set a school record for saves in a season when he got his 12th in a game against the University of Nevada-Reno. After the 1988 season, he played collegiate summer baseball with the Harwich Mariners of the Cape Cod Baseball League and was named a league all-star. In 1990, his senior season, Scott struck out 90 batters, highest in the conference. Despite this, Scott was not selected in the 1990 Major League Baseball draft. However, he was signed by the California Angels as an amateur free agent shortly after the draft on June 13, 1990.

== Playing career ==
Scott played his first season with the Boise Hawks of the Northwest League. In 27 pitching appearances, he had an earned run average (ERA) of 1.34, and won two games and lost one. Scott moved up the next season to the Quad Cities Angels of the Midwest League, where he pitched in 47 games, finishing the season with an ERA of 1.55 and 19 saves. The following season, he moved up to both the Double-A and Triple-A affiliates of the Angels, the Midland Angels and Edmonton Trappers, respectively. Scott played in 27 games for Midland and again had an ERA under 2.00 (1.82), though with Edmonton he pitched in 31 games with a 5.20 ERA. After starting the 1993 season with the Vancouver Canadians, the Angels' new Triple-A affiliate, he was promoted to the Angels' roster, and made his major league debut on May 31, 1993.

Scott made his debut against the Toronto Blue Jays, and pitched a shutout eighth inning in a 10–5 loss. After pitching in five more games in relief, he was at a hospital on June 18 with his wife for the birth of their newborn son, and while at the hospital, received a call from Dan O'Brien Sr. telling him that he was being sent back down to the minors. After a couple months in Vancouver, Scott was called back up to the majors in September. He pitched in ten more games that season, and notched his only major league win on September 19 against the Texas Rangers. He made his final major league appearance on October 1, 1993, against the Oakland Athletics.

After being released by the Angels on November 16, 1993, Scott signed a contract with the Yokohama BayStars of Nippon Professional Baseball. After a year, he came back to the minor leagues, and played for the Colorado Springs Sky Sox in the Colorado Rockies farm system in 1995. In 59 games, Scott went 4–10 with a 4.70 ERA. He spent the next two seasons with the Buffalo Bisons of the Cleveland Indians farm system, where he pitched 98 games in two seasons and had an ERA below three. Scott played for three minor league teams in 1999, and then spent the 2000 season with the Clearwater Phillies of the Philadelphia Phillies farm system, where he played in four games, as well as with three other farm teams. After pitching in 14 games with an ERA over 10 for the Tucson Sidewinders, the Triple-A affiliate of the Arizona Diamondbacks, Scott retired.

== Coaching career ==
Starting in 2009, Scott has served as a pitching coach and minor league pitching coordinator in the Colorado Rockies organization.

On November 1, 2019, Scott was named the bullpen coach for the Colorado Rockies. On October 25, 2021, Scott was promoted to the title of pitching coach, after Steve Foster stepped down to spend more time with his family. On October 22, 2025, it was announced that Scott and the Rockies would be parting ways.

Scott entered the 2026 season as the assistant pitching coach for the Los Angeles Angels. On August 11, 2026, Scott was fired by the Angels alongside Mike Maddux and Dom Chiti.
