= Jonathan Hernández (baseball) =

Dominican-American baseball player (born 1996)

Free agent
- Pitcher
- Born: July 6, 1996 (age 30); Memphis, Tennessee, U.S.
- Bats: Right Throws: Right

MLB debut
- August 21, 2019, for the Texas Rangers

MLB statistics (through 2026 season)
- Win–loss record: 13–8
- Earned run average: 4.49
- Strikeouts: 172
- Stats at Baseball Reference

Teams
- Texas Rangers (2019–2020, 2022–2024); Seattle Mariners (2024); Los Angeles Dodgers (2026)

Jonathan Hernández (born July 6, 1996) is a Dominican-American professional baseball pitcher who is a free agent. He has previously played in Major League Baseball (MLB) for the Texas Rangers, Seattle Mariners, and Los Angeles Dodgers.

== Career ==
=== Texas Rangers ===
Hernández signed with the Texas Rangers as an international free agent on January 30, 2013, for a $300,000 signing bonus. He spent the 2013 and 2014 seasons playing for the Dominican Summer League Rangers. He spent the 2015 season with the Arizona Rangers of the Rookie-level Arizona League, going 1–1 with a 3.00 ERA in 45 innings. He spent the 2016 season with the Hickory Crawdads of the Single–A South Atlantic League, going 10–9 with a 4.56 ERA in 116 1/3 innings.

Hernández started the 2017 season with the Hickory Crawdads of the Single–A South Atlantic League and was promoted to the Down East Wood Ducks of the High–A Carolina League. He was chosen to represent the Rangers in the All-Star Futures Game. He combined for a 5–11 record with a 4.03 ERA over 111 2/3 innings in 2017. On November 20, 2017, the Rangers added Hernández to their 40-man roster to protect him from the Rule 5 draft. He began the 2018 season with the Wood Ducks, and received a midseason promotion to the Frisco RoughRiders of the Double–A Texas League. Hernández posted a 4–2 record with a 2.20 ERA, with 77 strikeouts in 57 1/3 innings in 10 games (10 starts) with the Wood Ducks. In 12 games (12 starts) with Frisco, he posted a 4–4 record with a 4.92 ERA and 57 strikeouts in 64 innings. The Rangers optioned Hernández to Frisco to open the 2019 season, and he went 5–9 with a 5.16 ERA over 96 innings with them.

The Rangers promoted Hernández to the major leagues for the first time on August 20, 2019. He made his major league debut on August 21 versus the Los Angeles Angels; pitching 2 1/3 scoreless innings and earning the win. Hernández finished the season with Texas, going 2–1 with a 4.32 ERA and 19 strikeouts over 16 2/3 innings. In 2020, he went 5–1 with a 2.90 ERA and 31 strikeouts over 31 innings for Texas.

On March 9, 2021, Hernández was shut down for at least four weeks after being diagnosed with a "low-grade" sprain of his ulnar collateral ligament in his right elbow. On March 30, Hernández was placed on the 60-day injured list. On April 12, Hernández underwent Tommy John surgery and missed the entirety of the season.

Following completion of rehabilitation assignments, Hernández returned to action for Texas in July 2022. On July 31, Hernández recorded his first career save after pitching a scoreless ninth inning against the Los Angeles Angels. He finished that season after posting a 2–3 record with a 2.97 ERA and 27 strikeouts over 30 1/3 innings.

On January 13, 2023, Hernández agreed to a one-year, $995K contract with the Rangers, avoiding salary arbitration. He made 33 appearances for the Rangers in 2023, recording a 5.40 ERA with 34 strikeouts across 31 2/3 innings pitched.

Hernández made 26 appearances for Texas in 2024, posting a 3–1 record and 5.05 ERA with 36 strikeouts across 41 innings of work. Hernández was designated for assignment by the Rangers on July 30, 2024.

=== Seattle Mariners ===
On August 2, 2024, Hernández was claimed off waivers by the Seattle Mariners. In three appearances for the Mariners, he struggled to an 11.57 ERA with three strikeouts across 2 1/3 innings pitched. Hernández was designated for assignment by Seattle on August 8. He cleared waivers and was sent outright to the Triple–A Tacoma Rainiers on August 11. Hernández elected free agency on October 4.

=== Tampa Bay Rays ===
On January 30, 2025, Hernández signed a minor league contract with the Tampa Bay Rays. He made 12 appearances for the Triple-A Durham Bulls, posting a 1-0 record and 2.25 ERA with 13 strikeouts over 12 innings of work. Hernández elected free agency following the season on November 6.

=== Philadelphia Phillies ===
On December 17, 2025, Hernández signed a minor league contract with the Philadelphia Phillies. He made 13 appearances for the Triple-A Lehigh Valley IronPigs, posting a 1-0 record and 4.80 ERA with 22 strikeouts and one save over 15 innings of work. Hernández was released by the Phillies organization on May 17, 2026.

=== Los Angeles Dodgers ===
On May 18, 2026, Hernández signed a major league contract with the Los Angeles Dodgers. He pitched 17 2/3 innings over 12 games and allowed sixteen runs on 19 hits and 12 walks. Hernández was designated for assignment by the Dodgers on June 30. He cleared waivers and was sent outright to the Triple-A Oklahoma City Comets on July 3. Hernández was added back to the major league roster on August 3. After tossing 4 2/3 scoreless innings across three appearances, Hernández was designated for assignment again on August 10. He was added back to the team's active roster on August 13. Hernández was once more designated for assignment on August 19. He cleared waivers and was sent outright back to Oklahoma City on August 21. In 25 1/3 innings for the Dodgers, he had a 5.68 ERA and in 14 2/3 innings for the Comets, he had a 3.07 ERA. He elected free agency on October 22.

== Personal life ==
Hernández's father, Fernando Hernández, pitched in Major League Baseball. Jonathan was born in Memphis, Tennessee, when his father played baseball there, but he was raised in the Dominican Republic. He is a Catholic.

== See also ==
- List of second-generation Major League Baseball players
