= Joe Barlow =

American baseball player (born 1995)

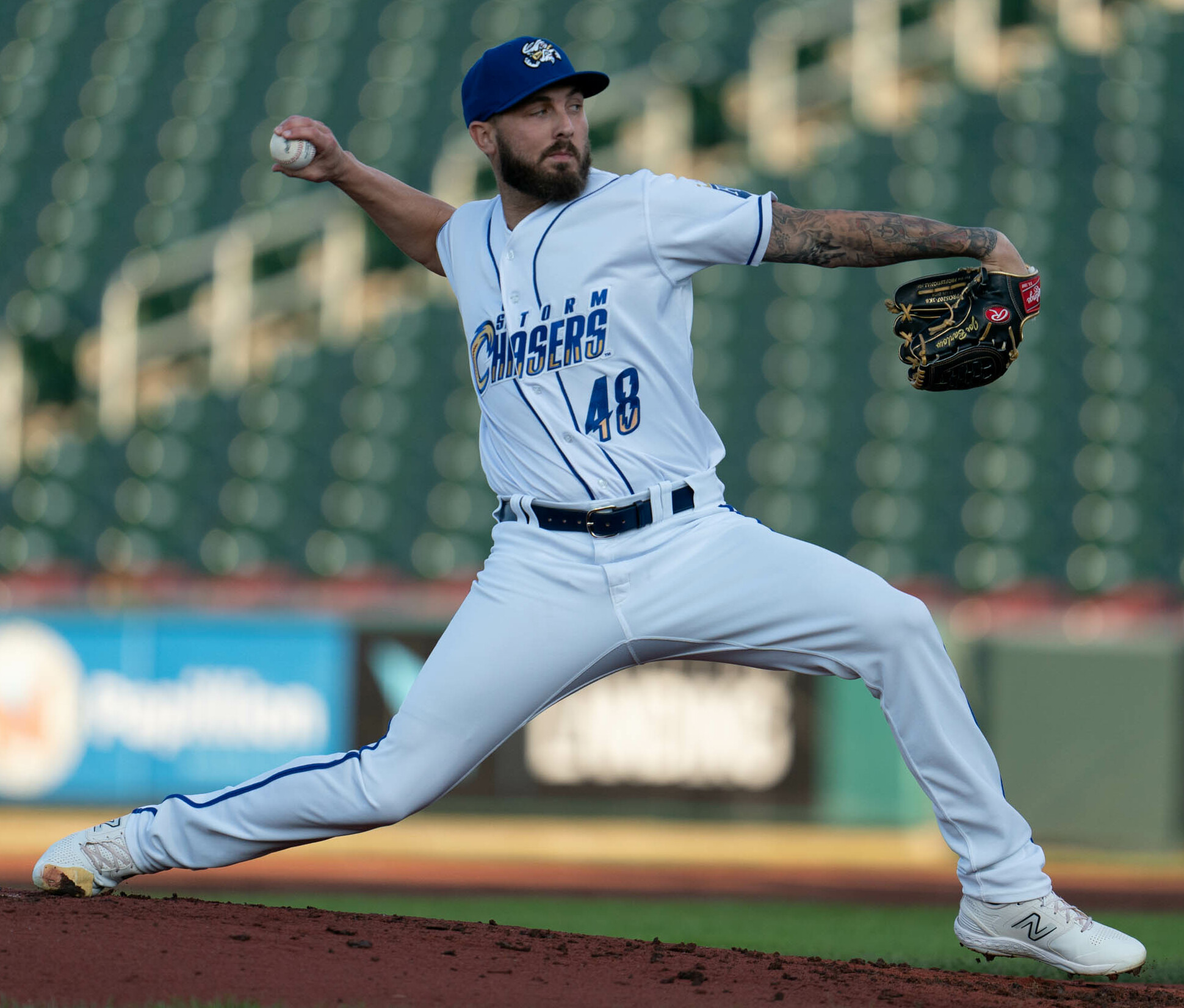
- Barlow with the Omaha Storm Chasers in 2023

Free agent
- Pitcher
- Born: September 28, 1995 (age 30); Riverton, Utah, U.S.
- Bats: Right Throws: Right

MLB debut
- June 24, 2021, for the Texas Rangers

MLB statistics (through 2023 season)
- Win–loss record: 4–4
- Earned run average: 3.05
- Strikeouts: 61
- Saves: 24
- Stats at Baseball Reference

Teams
- Texas Rangers (2021–2023)

Joseph Israel Barlow (born September 28, 1995) is an American professional baseball pitcher who is a free agent. He has previously played in Major League Baseball (MLB) for the Texas Rangers.

== Amateur career ==
Barlow grew up in a household with eleven siblings, and attended Riverton High School in Riverton, Utah. He attended Salt Lake Community College in Salt Lake City, Utah and played college baseball for them in 2015 and 2016. During his freshman season, Barlow was a catcher and hit just .202 with zero home runs and 13 RBI. In his sophomore season, Barlow appeared at pitcher and catcher. Hitting .208 with 14 RBI. In 13 games pitched (7 starts) Barlow went 3–3 with a 2.12 ERA and 51 strikeouts over 46 2/3 innings pitched. The Texas Rangers selected Barlow in the eleventh round, with the 339th overall selection, of the 2016 MLB draft. He signed with them for a $85,000 signing bonus.

== Professional career ==
=== Texas Rangers ===
After signing, Barlow converted to full–time pitching and was assigned to the AZL Rangers of the Rookie-level Arizona League to make his professional debut; in 32 2/3 innings pitched for them, he posted a 2–4 record with a 4.41 ERA. He split the 2017 season between extended spring training and the Spokane Indians of the Low-A Northwest League, producing a 6–1 record with a 2.00 ERA and 64 strikeouts in 45 innings. In 2018, Barlow spent the full season with the Hickory Crawdads of the Single-A South Atlantic League, producing a 3–3 record with a 1.68 ERA and 91 strikeouts in 59 innings. After the 2018 regular season, Barlow played for the Surprise Saguaros of the Arizona Fall League. Barlow was assigned to the Down East Wood Ducks of the High-A Carolina League to open the 2019 season. He went 4–0 with a 0.38 ERA and 44 strikeouts in 23 2/3 innings for them. On May 29, he was promoted to the Frisco RoughRiders of the Double-A Texas League, and went 1–1 with a 1.18 ERA and 27 strikeouts in 16 innings for them. On July 15, he was promoted to the Nashville Sounds of the Triple-A Pacific Coast League, and went 1–1 with a 8.83 ERA in 17 1/3 innings. Barlow did not play in a game in 2020 due to the cancellation of the Minor League Baseball season because of the COVID-19 pandemic. Barlow opened the 2021 season with the Round Rock Express of the Triple-A West, going 0–1 with a 2.57 ERA and 29 strikeouts over 21 innings.

On June 23, 2021, Texas selected Barlow's contract and promoted him to the major leagues for the first time. He made his MLB debut the next day, pitching a scoreless inning against the Oakland Athletics. In the game, he also notched his first career strikeout, punching out A's infielder Jed Lowrie. Barlow set a Rangers franchise record on August 2, becoming the first pitcher to record eight straight strikeouts of opposing batters faced. Barlow served as the Rangers closer to finish the 2021 season. In 2021, he posted a 0–2 record with a 1.55 ERA, 27 strikeouts, and 11 saves over 29 innings. He was named the Rangers September/October Pitcher of the Month.

Barlow spent time as the Texas closer in 2022, but ultimately lost the role due to ineffectiveness and injury. With Texas in 2022, he posted a 3–1 record with a 3.86 ERA, 28 strikeouts, and 13 saves over 35 innings. Following the season, on November 4, 2022, Barlow underwent surgery to separate a pair of fused tendons in his right wrist.

Barlow was optioned to Triple-A Round Rock to begin the 2023 season. In 13 games for the Rangers, he registered a 4.66 ERA with 6 strikeouts in 9 2/3 innings pitched. On July 30, He was designated for assignment.

=== Kansas City Royals ===
On August 4, 2023, Barlow was claimed on waivers by the Kansas City Royals. He struggled to a 9.24 ERA in 7 games for the Triple–A Omaha Storm Chasers prior to being designated for assignment on September 1. Barlow cleared waivers and was sent outright to Omaha on September 3. He elected free agency following the season on November 6.

=== Chicago White Sox ===
On January 12, 2024, Barlow signed a minor league contract with the Chicago White Sox. While playing for the Triple–A Charlotte Knights on June 16, Barlow was part of a seven–pitcher no-hitter against the Durham Bulls. In 12 appearances for Charlotte, he struggled to a 10.03 ERA with 14 strikeouts across 11 2/3 innings pitched. Barlow was released by the White Sox organization on July 12.

=== Texas Rangers (second stint) ===
On February 16, 2025, Barlow signed a minor league contract with the Texas Rangers organization. He made 50 appearances for the Triple-A Round Rock Express, compiling a 5-3 record and 4.57 ERA with 73 strikeouts and two saves over 65 innings of work. Barlow elected free agency following the season on November 6.
