= Elier Hernández =

Dominican baseball player (born 1994)

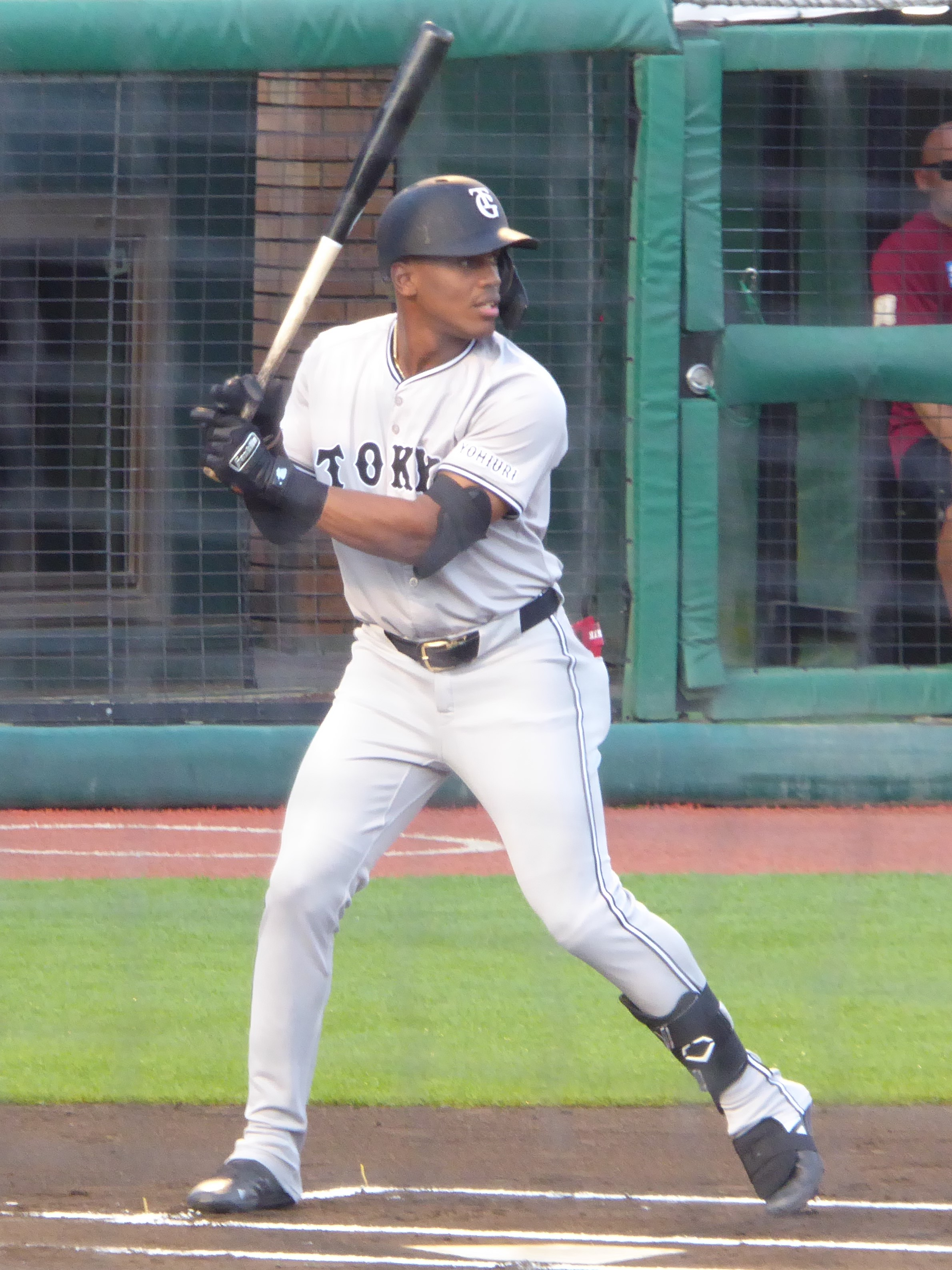
- Hernández with the Yomiuri Giants in 2024

Caliente de Durango – No. 50
- Outfielder
- Born: November 21, 1994 (age 31); San Cristóbal, Dominican Republic
- Bats: Right Throws: Right

Professional debut
- MLB: July 14, 2022, for the Texas Rangers
- NPB: May 28, 2024, for the Yomiuri Giants

MLB statistics (through 2022 season)
- Batting average: .182
- Home runs: 0
- Runs batted in: 3

NPB statistics (through 2025 season)
- Batting average: .260
- Home runs: 10
- Runs batted in: 38
- Stats at Baseball Reference

Teams
- Texas Rangers (2022); Yomiuri Giants (2024–2025)

Elier Hernández (born November 21, 1994) is a Dominican professional baseball outfielder for the Caliente de Durango of the Mexican League. He has previously played in Major League Baseball (MLB) for the Texas Rangers and in Nippon Professional Baseball (NPB) for the Yomiuri Giants.

== Career ==
=== Kansas City Royals ===
Hernández signed with the Kansas City Royals as an international free agent on July 20, 2011. He made his professional debut appearing in 60 games with the rookie-level Idaho Falls Chukars in 2012. He returned to the Chukars in 2013, slashing .301/.350/.439 with three home runs and 44 RBI in 66 games. In 2014, Hernández spent the season with the Single-A Lexington Legends, appearing in 111 games and hitting .264/.296/.393 with nine home runs and 24 RBI.

In 2015, Hernández split the season between Lexington and the High-A Wilmington Blue Rocks, posting a cumulative .268/.312/.379 slash with six home runs, 54 RBI, and 10 stolen bases in 124 contests. He played in 134 games for Wilmington the following year, batting .226/.281/.310 with two home runs and 43 RBI. For the 2017 season, he played in 46 games split between Wilmington and the Double-A Northwest Arkansas Naturals, hitting .317/.355/.489 with five home runs and 37 RBI between the two affiliates.

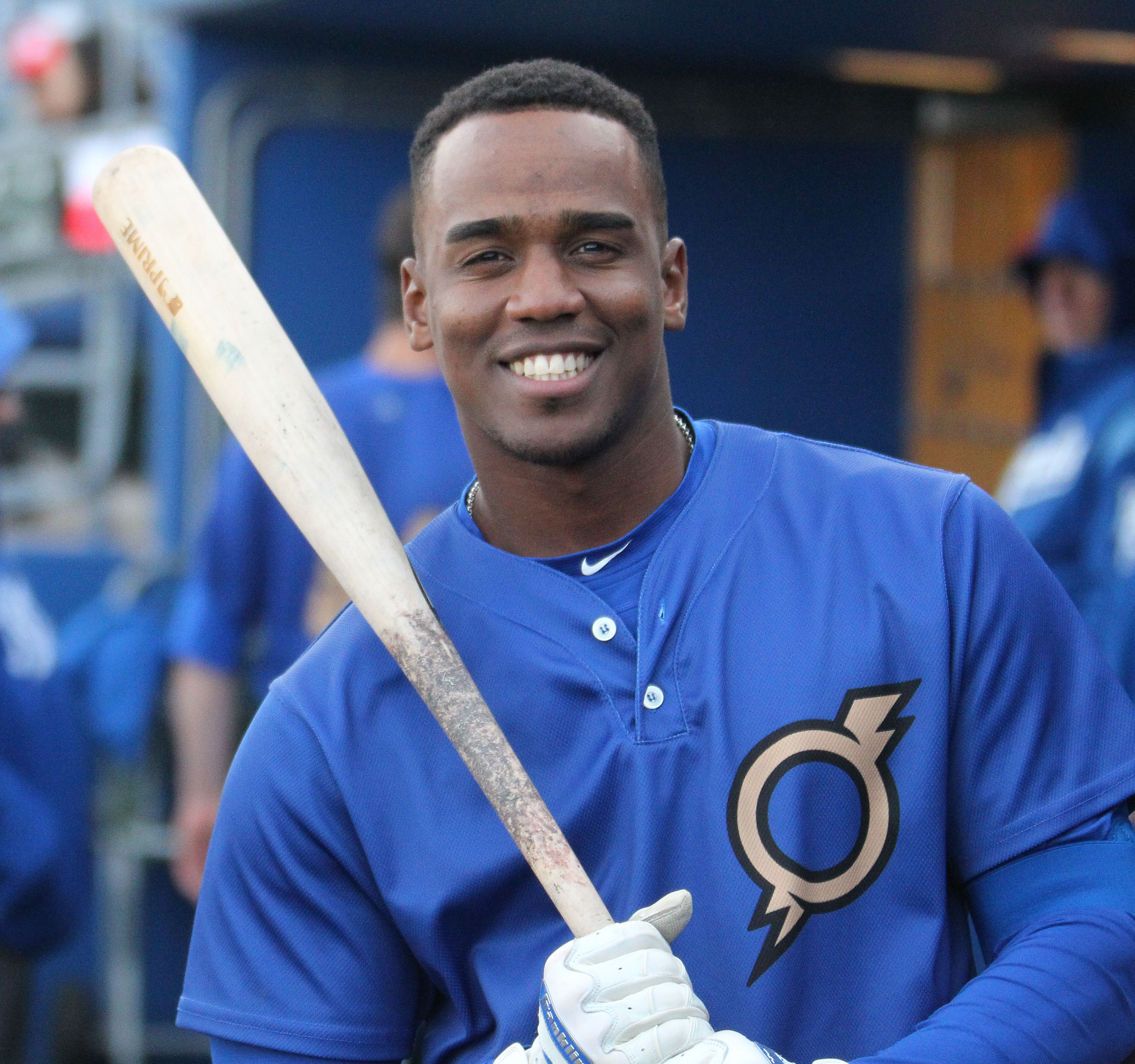
Hernández in 2019

In 2018, Hernández played in 131 games split between Northwest Arkansas and the Triple-A Omaha Storm Chasers, hitting a cumulative .285/.330/.374 with three home runs, 65 RBI, and 10 stolen bases. The following season, Hernández spent the year with Omaha, playing in 112 games and hitting .245/.296/.364 with 10 home runs, and 36 RBI and eight stolen bases. He elected free agency following the season on November 4, 2019. Hernández did not sign with a team and did not play in a game in 2020 due to the cancellation of the minor league season because of the COVID-19 pandemic.

=== Texas Rangers ===
On December 28, 2020, Hernández signed a minor league contract with the Texas Rangers organization. He spent the 2021 season with the Double-A Frisco RoughRiders and the Triple-A Round Rock Express, posting a cumulative .231/.292/.394 slash with career-highs in home runs (16) and RBI (62) across 108 games. He was assigned to Round Rock to begin the 2022 season.

On July 14, 2022, Hernández was selected to the 40-man roster and promoted to the major leagues for the first time. He collected his first career hit the same day, lacing a single off of Seattle Mariners starter Marco Gonzales. He appeared in 14 games for the big league club, going 6-for-33 with 3 RBI. On August 16, Hernández was designated for assignment by the Rangers. He cleared waivers and was sent outright to Round Rock on August 22. He elected free agency following the season on November 10.

On January 6, 2023, Hernández re-signed with the Rangers on a minor league contract. In a 137 games for Triple–A Round Rock, he batted .298/.360/.478 with career–highs in home runs (18) and RBI (99). Hernández elected free agency following the season on November 6.

On December 27, 2023, Hernández re-signed with the Rangers on a new minor league contract. In 20 games for Triple–A Round Rock, he batted .290/.386/.474 with two home runs and 10 RBI. On May 1, 2024, Hernández was released by the Rangers organization.

=== Yomiuri Giants ===
On May 10, 2024, Hernández signed a contract with the Yomiuri Giants of Nippon Professional Baseball. He returned for a second season with the Giants in 2025. He became a free agent following the 2025 season.

=== Caliente de Durango ===
On March 6, 2026, Hernández signed with the Caliente de Durango of the Mexican League.

== See also ==
- List of Major League Baseball players from the Dominican Republic
