= Tony Beasley =

American baseball coach (born 1966)

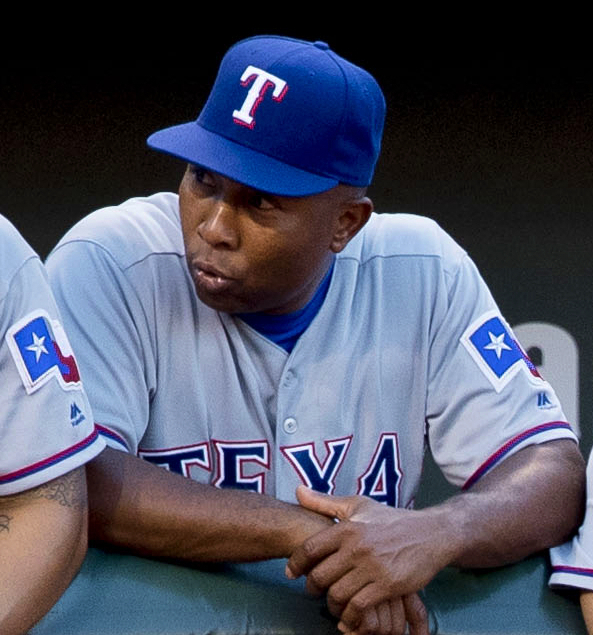
- Beasley with the Texas Rangers in 2016

Pittsburgh Pirates – No. 27
- Third base coach
- Born: December 5, 1966 (age 59); Sparta, Virginia, U.S.
- Bats: Right Throws: Right

MLB statistics
- Managerial record: 17–31
- Winning %: .354
- Stats at Baseball Reference

Teams
- As manager: Texas Rangers (2022); As coach: Washington Nationals (2006); Pittsburgh Pirates (2008–2010); Texas Rangers (2015–2025); Pittsburgh Pirates (2026–present)

Career highlights and awards
- As coach: World Series champion (2023)

Anthony Wayne Beasley (born December 5, 1966) is an American professional baseball coach who currently serves as the third base coach for the Pittsburgh Pirates of Major League Baseball (MLB). He has previously served as an interim manager for the Texas Rangers and third base coach and minor league manager in the Pirates and Washington Nationals organizations.

== Professional career ==
Primarily a middle infielder, Beasley spent nine seasons as a player in the minor leagues and batted .260 with 22 homers and 242 RBI in 854 games. He was originally selected by the Baltimore Orioles in the 19th round of the 1989 June draft, before being acquired by Pittsburgh in a deal for infielder Tommy Shields in September 1991. In his minor league career, Beasley was named to the Carolina League All-Star team in both 1990 and 1991. He also garnered Southern League All-Star laurels in 1996.

== Managerial and coaching career ==
Beasley began his managerial career with the Williamsport Crosscutters in 2001 and led the club to a 46-26 regular season record and a first-place finish; the club was declared co-champions of the New York–Penn League along with Brooklyn. He was named Low-A Manager of-the-Year by Baseball America in consecutive seasons with the Hickory Crawdads in 2002-03 and to the South Atlantic League's mid-season All-Star squad in 2003. Beasley guided the Crawdads to the SAL championship and the fifth-best record in the minors in 2002 and was also selected to the leagues post-season All-Star Team.

Beasley has spent four seasons as a coach at the Major League level. In 2006, he worked as the third-base coach for the Nationals under manager Frank Robinson. He then returned to the Pittsburgh Pirates' organization, where he had spent nearly all of his career to that point, spending the 2007 season as the Pirates' Minor League Infield Coordinator, a role in which he was instrumental in prospect Neil Walker's transition from catcher to third base during spring training. The following year Beasley returned to major-league coaching as the third-base coach on manager John Russell's staff, and he continued in that role until the end of the 2010 season. In total, Beasley spent 18 years with the Pittsburgh organization.

Beasley spent five seasons as a manager in the Pirates' farm system, guiding his club to the post-season in all five years and a combined record of 372-258 (.590 winning pct.) during the regular season. He was tabbed by Baseball America as the Double-A Manager-of-the-Year in 2004 after guiding Altoona to the Eastern League championship series (his team lost to New Hampshire). Beasley also served the United States National Team as a coach at the MLB Futures Game in Houston during All-Star week in 2004.

In 2011, Beasley returned to the Nationals as manager of the Double-A Harrisburg Senators; then, in 2012–2013, he skippered Washington's top affiliate, the then Syracuse Chiefs of the Triple-A International League. The following year, in 2014, Beasley was the co-field-coordinator of instruction in the Washington Nationals' minor-league system.

In addition to his regular season managerial duties, Beasley also managed the Mesa Desert Dogs during the Arizona Fall League in 2004, guiding the club to an 18-13 record and a first-place finish in the National Division (his club lost out to the Mesa Solar Sox in the Championship Series). After serving as a player/coach for the Double-A Carolina Mudcats and the Single-A Lynchburg Hillcats in 1998, Beasley began his full-time coaching career as the hitting coach with the rookie-level Gulf Coast League Pirates in 1999. He worked in the same capacity with Lynchburg in 2000.

At the end of 2014, Beasley left the Nationals to join the Texas Rangers as their third-base coach. In August 2022, after the firing of manager Chris Woodward, Beasley was appointed interim manager for the rest of 2022 season, and managed 48 games. Following the hiring of Bruce Bochy in 2023, he went back to being the third-base coach. At the end of 2025, Beasley left the Rangers to pursue other opportunities.

On November 15, 2025, Beasley was hired to serve as the third base coach for the Pittsburgh Pirates.

== Personal life ==
Beasley is a Christian. He is married to Stacy Beasley. They have one son.

On February 19, 2016, Beasley was diagnosed with rectal cancer, forcing him to miss the start of the 2016 season. He was declared cancer-free in December 2, 2016 and returned to his position as third base coach in 2017. In 2021, five years later, he still continued to show no signs of cancer.

== Teams ==
As third base coach

- Washington Nationals (2006) Wore #29
- Pittsburgh Pirates (2008 – 2010) Wore #29 in 2008–2009 & wore #10 in 2010
- Texas Rangers (2015 – August 15, 2022 & 2023 – 2025) Wore #27

As interim manager

- Texas Rangers (2022 – August 15, 2022) Wore #27

On Wednesday, July 30, 2008 before the game against the Colorado Rockies, Tony Beasley performed the national anthem at the Pirates' home stadium, PNC Park.

=== Managerial record ===
Team	Year	Regular season					Postseason			
Team	Year	Games	Won	Lost	Win %	Finish	Won	Lost	Win %	Result
TEX	2022	48	17	31	.354	4th in AL West	–	–	–	
Total		48	17	31	.354		0	0	–	

Sporting positions
Preceded by Curtis Wilkerson	Williamsport Crosscutters manager 2001	Succeeded by Andy Stewart
Preceded by Pete Mackanin	Hickory Crawdads manager 2002–2003	Succeeded by Dave Clark
Preceded by Dale Sveum	Altoona Curve manager 2004–2005	Succeeded by Tim Leiper
Preceded by Dave Huppert	Washington Nationals third base coach 2006	Succeeded by Tim Tolman
Preceded by Jeff Cox	Pittsburgh Pirates third base coach 2008–2010	Succeeded by Nick Leyva
Preceded by Randy Knorr	Harrisburg Senators manager 2011	Succeeded by Matthew LeCroy
Preceded by Randy Knorr	Syracuse Chiefs manager 2012–2013	Succeeded by Billy Gardner Jr.
Preceded by Gary Pettis; Corey Ragsdale	Texas Rangers third base coach 2015–2022; 2023–2025	Succeeded by Corey Ragsdale
Preceded by Chris Woodward	Texas Rangers manager 2022	Succeeded by Bruce Bochy
