= Corey Ragsdale =

American baseball coach (born 1982)

Texas Rangers – No. 64
- Coach
- Born: November 10, 1982 (age 43); Jonesboro, Arkansas, U.S.
- Bats: Right Throws: Right

Teams
- Texas Rangers (2020–present)

Career highlights and awards
- World Series champion (2023)

Corey William Ragsdale (born November 10, 1982) is an American professional baseball former player and current coach. He is the third base coach and major league field coordinator for the Texas Rangers of Major League Baseball (MLB).

== Career ==
Ragsdale attended Nettleton High School in Jonesboro, Arkansas. Ragsdale committed to the University of Arkansas but was drafted by the New York Mets in the 2nd round of the 2001 MLB draft and signed. An infielder, Ragsdale played in the Mets organization from 2001 through 2007. Ragsdale joined Texas Rangers organization as a minor league free agent in 2008. He converted to pitching during the 2008 season and continued playing through the 2009 season.

Ragsdale remained in the Texas organization as a coach and served as an infield instructor at their Arizona complex in 2010. In 2011, he served as an infield coach for the Hickory Crawdads. He served as the manager of the AZL Rangers in 2012, leading them to an Arizona League championship. Ragsdale served as the manager for Hickory from the 2013 through 2015 seasons. Ragsdale led the Crawdads to the South Atlantic League championship in 2015. Ragsdale served as the minor league field coordinator for Texas from 2016 through 2019. He served as manager of the Down East Wood Ducks in 2019.

Ragsdale was promoted to the major league staff, as major league field coordinator, on November 11, 2019. Ragsdale was named the Rangers first base coach on July 2, 2020. Ragsdale was moved to third base coach on August 15, 2022, after manager Chris Woodward was fired and Tony Beasley was elevated to interim manager. He returned to first base coach for the 2023-2025 seasons. Ragsdale shifted back to third base coach prior to the 2026 season, on the staff of new manager Skip Schumaker.

== Awards ==
Ragsdale received the Rangers 2015 Bobby Jones Player Development Man of the Year award. He was named the 2019 Carolina League Manager of the Year. Ragsdale was named the 2019 Baseball America Minor League Manager of the Year.
