= Chris Woodward =

American baseball player and coach (born 1976)

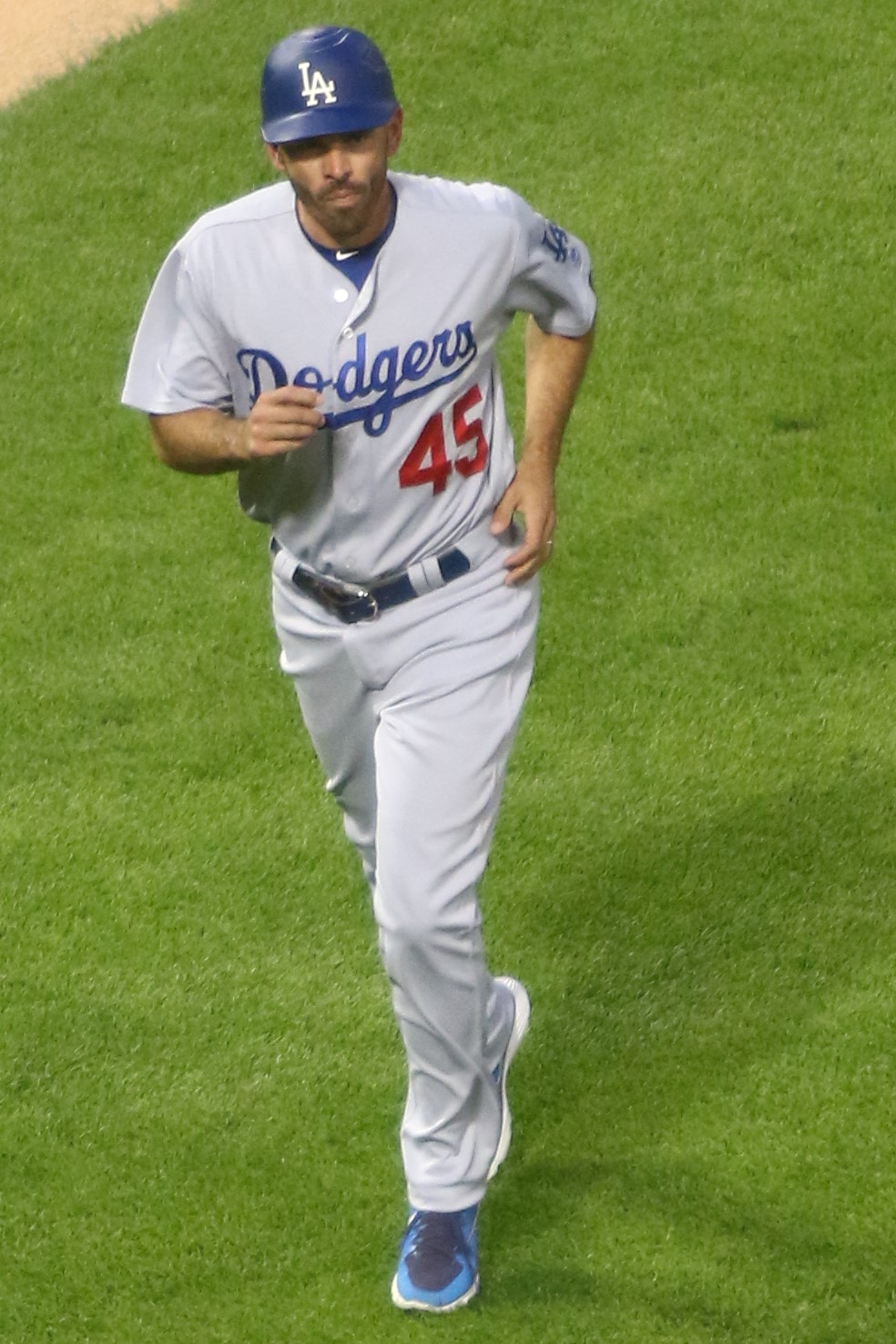
- Woodward coaching the Dodgers in 2017

Los Angeles Dodgers – No. 84
- Infielder / Manager
- Born: June 27, 1976 (age 50); Covina, California, U.S.
- Batted: Right Threw: Right

MLB debut
- June 7, 1999, for the Toronto Blue Jays

Last MLB appearance
- September 27, 2011, for the Toronto Blue Jays

MLB statistics
- Batting average: .239
- Home runs: 33
- Runs batted in: 191
- Managerial record: 211–287
- Winning %: .424
- Stats at Baseball Reference
- Managerial record at Baseball Reference

Teams
- As player: Toronto Blue Jays (1999–2004); New York Mets (2005–2006); Atlanta Braves (2007); Seattle Mariners (2009); Boston Red Sox (2009); Seattle Mariners (2010); Toronto Blue Jays (2011); As manager: Texas Rangers (2019–2022); As coach: Seattle Mariners (2014–2015); Los Angeles Dodgers (2016–2018, 2025–present); Awards: World Series champion (2025)

Christopher Michael Woodward (born June 27, 1976) is an American former professional baseball utility player and current coach for the Los Angeles Dodgers of Major League Baseball (MLB). He played in MLB for the Toronto Blue Jays, New York Mets, Atlanta Braves, Seattle Mariners, and Boston Red Sox, from 1999 through 2012. He then served as a coach for the Mariners and Dodgers, from 2014 through 2018 and was the manager of the Texas Rangers from 2019 to 2022. He is currently the first base coach for the Dodgers.

== Baseball career ==
=== Amateur career ===
Woodward attended Northview High School in Covina, California, and Mt. San Antonio College.

=== Toronto Blue Jays ===
The Toronto Blue Jays selected Woodward in the 54th round of the 1994 Major League Baseball draft. He made his major league debut on June 7, 1999, hitting a sacrifice fly in an 8–2 loss to the New York Mets.

From 2002 through 2004, Woodward was the starting shortstop in about half of Toronto's games. On August 7, 2002, he achieved a rare feat by hitting three home runs in one game as a shortstop (the first as a Blue Jay and the 15th overall). After an injury-plagued and difficult offensive season in 2004, the Blue Jays released him.

=== New York Mets ===
In 2005, Woodward signed with the New York Mets. Woodward was the epitome of flexibility, playing at seven different positions including the entire infield and performing well off the bench and as a starter and even managed two game-winning hits. In 2006, he struggled with injuries and the Mets chose not to re-sign him.

=== Atlanta Braves ===
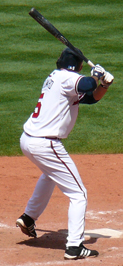
Woodward batting for the Atlanta Braves in 2007.

On December 20, 2006, Woodward agreed to a one-year deal with the Atlanta Braves. He went through a huge down season in Atlanta however, hitting an MLB-position player worst .199 with one home run.

=== Yankees, Phillies, and Brewers ===
On February 8, 2008, Woodward signed a minor league contract with the New York Yankees then was released on March 26 and signed with the Philadelphia Phillies on March 28, 2008, where he was assigned to the Phillies' Triple-A affiliate, the Lehigh Valley IronPigs. On May 2, 2008, Woodward was released. He signed a minor league contract with the Milwaukee Brewers on May 31, 2008, and was assigned to the Triple-A Nashville Sounds. He became a free agent following the season.

=== Seattle Mariners ===
Woodward signed a minor league contract with an invitation to spring training with the Seattle Mariners in 2009. On June 19, 2009, Woodward was called up from the Triple-A Tacoma Rainiers after second baseman José López was placed on the bereavement list. He made his debut for the Mariners that night, in their 4–3 win against the Arizona Diamondbacks, he was 2 for 4 in that game with a stolen base and a run scored. On August 4, Woodward was designated for assignment to make way for Adrián Beltré who was activated from the 15-day disabled list the same day.

He hit .299 with 52 hits, 12 doubles, one triple, one home run, 15 runs batted in (RBIs) and four stolen bases in 51 games with the Triple-A Rainiers. With the Mariners he hit .239 with one double and five RBIs in 20 games.

=== Boston Red Sox ===
On August 7, Woodward was claimed off waivers by the Boston Red Sox only to be designated for assignment eight days later on August 15, due to the acquisition of Álex González. He was later optioned to the Triple-A Pawtucket Red Sox and would be called up in September when rosters expanded.

=== Second stint with the Mariners ===
Woodward and the Seattle Mariners reached an agreement on a minor league contract with an invitation to spring training on January 6, 2010.

=== Second stint with the Blue Jays ===
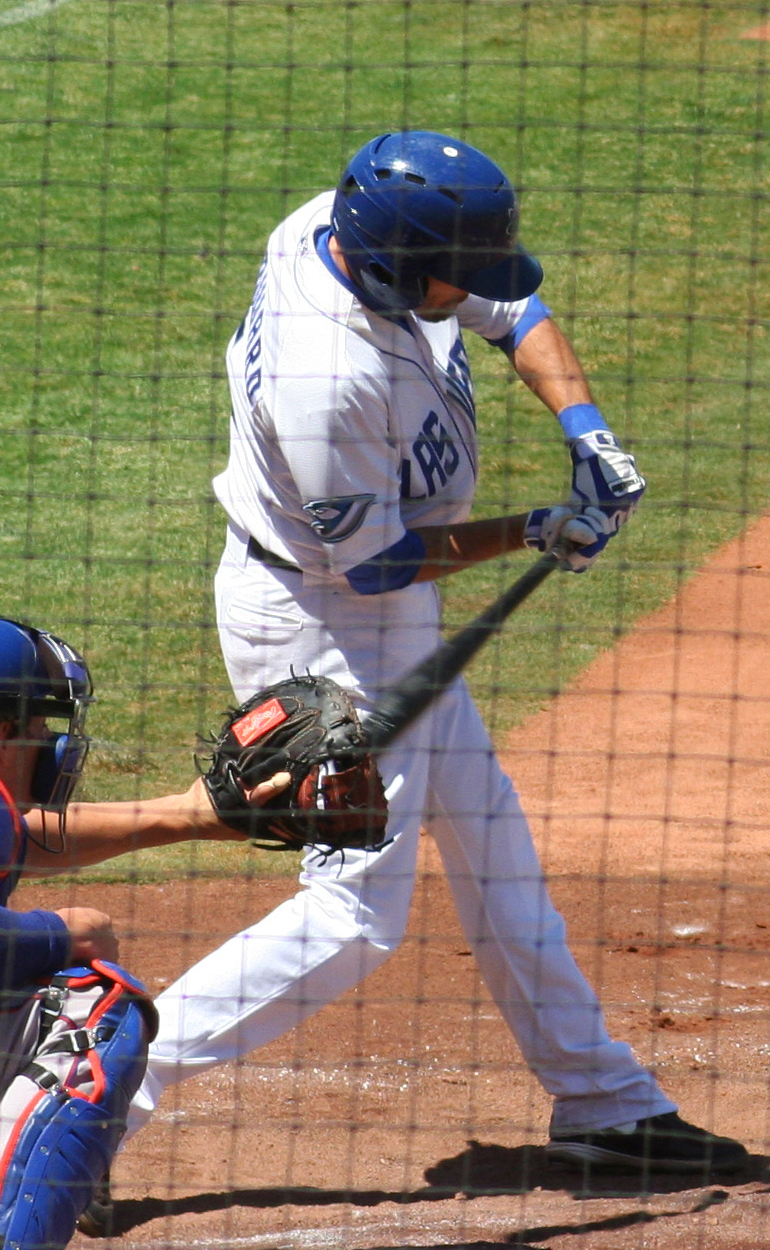
Woodward with the 51s in 2011

On March 14, 2011, Woodward signed a minor league contract with the Toronto Blue Jays. Woodward was called up by the Blue Jays organization on April 21, 2011. He was outrighted to the minors on April 28. He returned to the team on September 4 for the remainder of the season. For the season, he was hitless and did not reach base in ten at bats. He was named a 2011 MILB.COM Toronto Organization All Star, after batting 296/.353/.474 with 13 home runs in 422 at bats in AAA for the Las Vegas 51s.

He became a free agent after the season, and re-signed to a minor league contract for 2012 by the Toronto Blue Jays, who invited him to spring training. On April 3, Woodward was assigned to the Las Vegas 51s. With them, in 2012 he batted .285/.338/.392 with 2 home runs, 34 RBIs, and 4 stolen bases in 309 at bats.

== Coaching and managing career ==
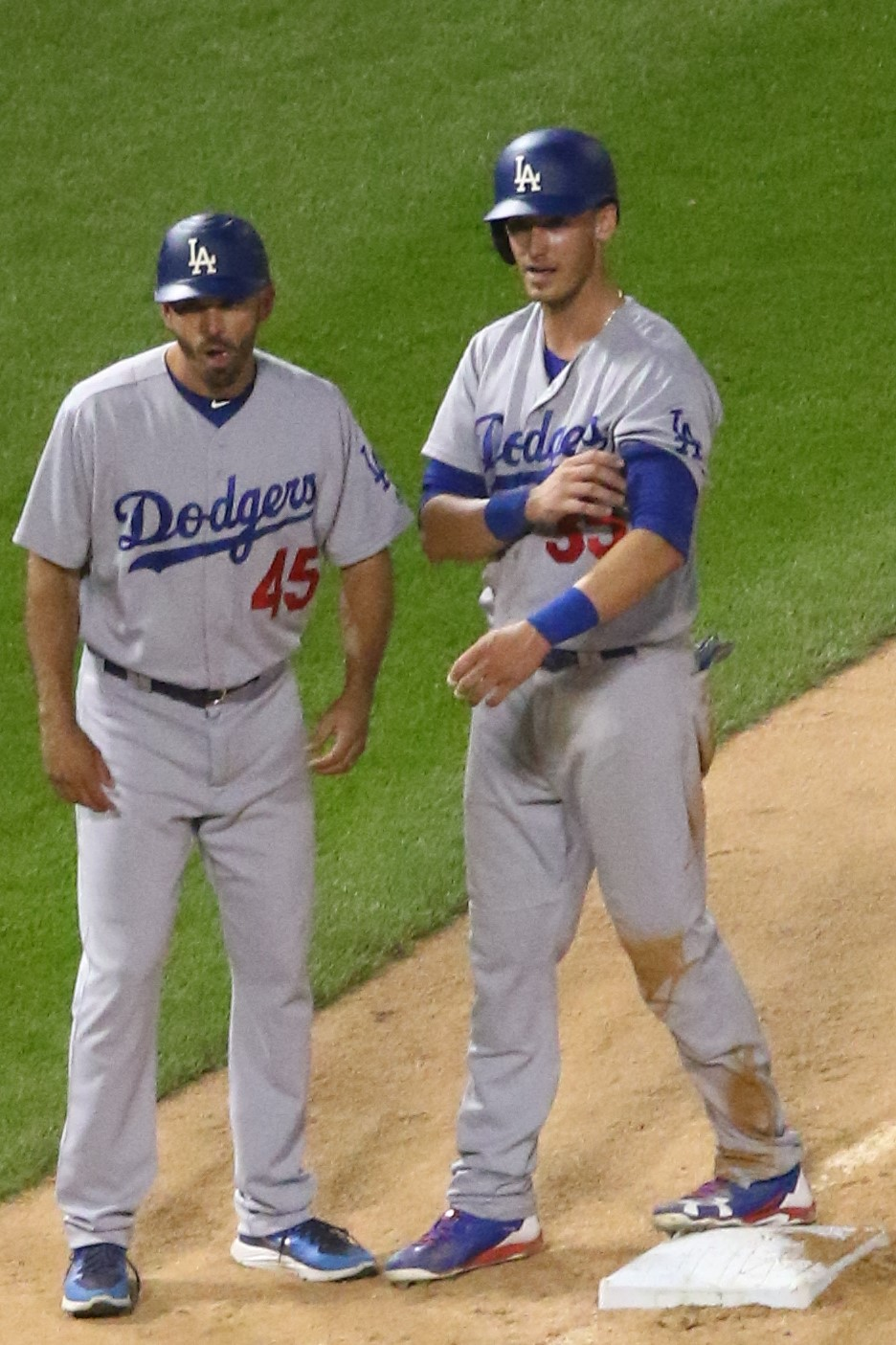
Woodward with Cody Bellinger for the 2017 Los Angeles Dodgers

=== Seattle Mariners ===
Woodward retired on November 1, 2012, and joined the Seattle Mariners organization as minor league infield coordinator. He became the Mariners' infield coach in 2014, and served as the Mariners first base coach in 2015, but opted not to return for the 2016 season after manager Lloyd McClendon was fired.

=== Los Angeles Dodgers ===
On December 17, 2015, he was named the third base coach for the Los Angeles Dodgers. He spent the 2016 through 2018 seasons in that position.

Woodward managed New Zealand in the 2017 World Baseball Classic qualification tournament in Australia in 2016. Woodward interviewed for the New York Yankees manager position after the 2017 season, which eventually went to Aaron Boone.

=== Texas Rangers ===
On November 2, 2018, Woodward agreed to a three-year contract to be the manager of the Texas Rangers beginning with the 2019 season. On March 24, 2021, the Rangers exercised Woodward's option for the 2022 season. On November 19, 2021, the Rangers signed Woodward to a contract extension through the 2023 season, with a club option for 2024. The Rangers fired Woodward on August 15, 2022.

=== Los Angeles Dodgers (second stint) ===
On January 20, 2023, Woodward was hired by the Dodgers as a special assistant in the front office as well as a roving infield instructor for their organization.

On November 22, 2024, it was announced that he would replace Clayton McCullough as the Dodgers first base coach, after McCullough was hired to manage the Miami Marlins.

=== Managerial record ===
Team	Year	Regular season					Postseason			
Team	Year	Games	Won	Lost	Win %	Finish	Won	Lost	Win %	Result
TEX	2019	162	78	84	.481	3rd in AL West				
TEX	2020	60	22	38	.367	5th in AL West				
TEX	2021	162	60	102	.370	5th in AL West				
TEX	2022	114	51	63	.447	Fired				
Total		498	211	287	.424					

== Personal life ==
Woodward is married to Erin Woodward, with whom he has three children. He met his wife, a native of Aurora, Ontario, while playing with the Toronto Blue Jays.

He and his family reside in Chandler, Arizona.

On March 8, 2004, Woodward was featured in season 3, episode 18, of Degrassi: The Next Generation.

Sporting positions
Preceded by Ron Roenicke	Los Angeles Dodgers third base coach 2016–2018	Succeeded by Dino Ebel
Preceded by Jeff Banister	Texas Rangers manager 2019–2022	Succeeded by Tony Beasley (interim)
Preceded by Clayton McCullough	Los Angeles Dodgers first base coach 2025–present	Succeeded by Incumbent
