= 2023 Texas Rangers season =

Major League Baseball season

2023 Texas Rangers
- World Series champions American League champions American League Wild Card winners
- League: American League
- Division: West
- Ballpark: Globe Life Field
- City: Arlington
- Record: 90–72 (.556)
- Divisional place: 2nd
- Owners: Ray Davis & Bob R. Simpson
- Manager: Bruce Bochy
- Television: Bally Sports Southwest
- Radio: KRLD 105.3 FM (English) KZMP 1540 AM (Spanish)
- Stats: ESPN.com; Baseball Reference

The 2023 Texas Rangers season was the 63rd of the Texas Rangers franchise overall, their 52nd in Arlington as the Rangers, and the fourth season at Globe Life Field. It was also the team's first season under the management of Bruce Bochy.

The Rangers had six players (five starters) named to the All-Star Game, a franchise record. On September 30, they clinched a playoff berth for the first time since 2016 with a win against the Seattle Mariners.

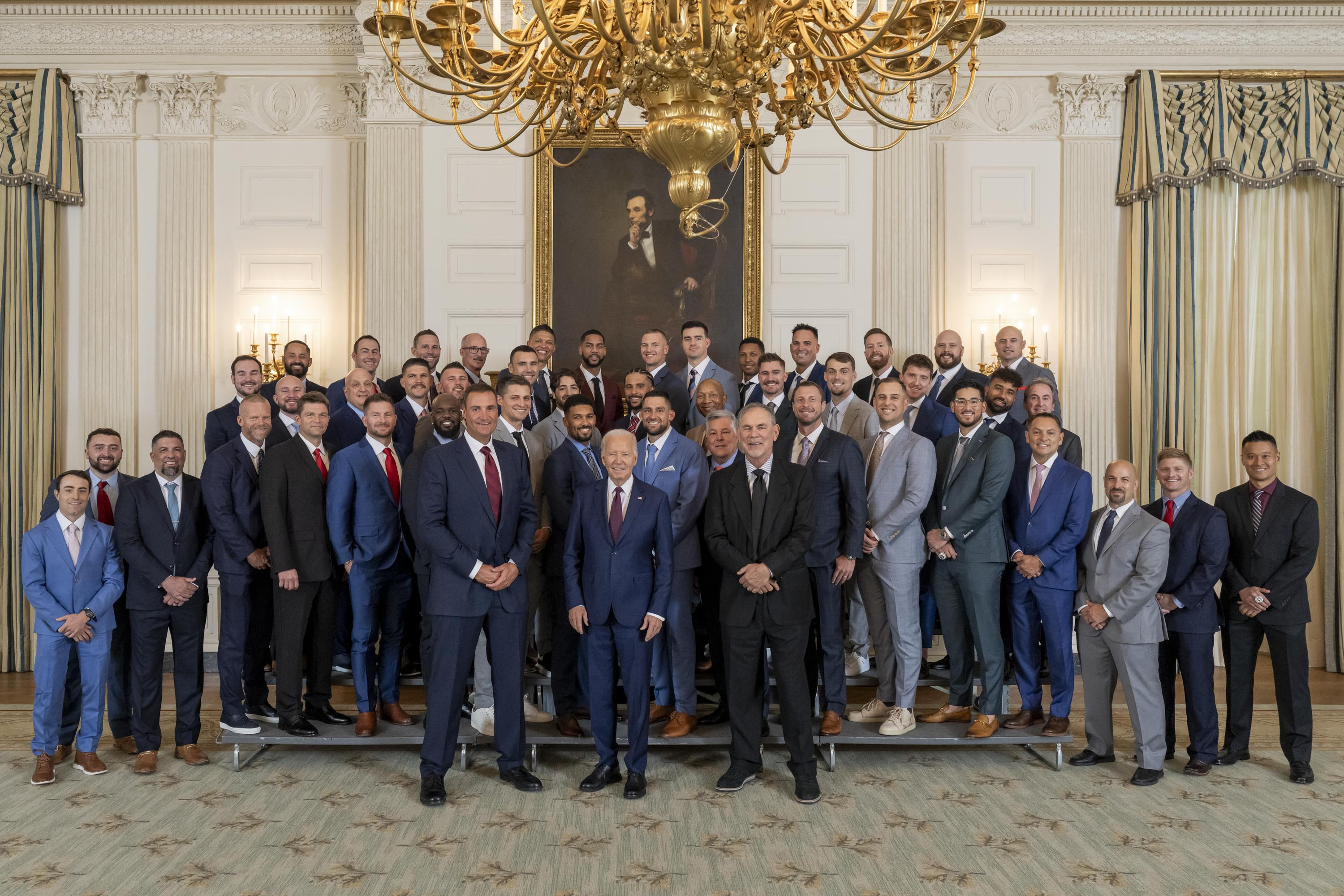
The 2023 World Series champion Texas Rangers at the White House

Despite leading the American League West for most of the season and finishing with the same record as the rival and defending champion Houston Astros, they finished second due to the Astros owning the tiebreaker as a result of taking the season series. The Rangers defeated the Tampa Bay Rays in the American League Wild Card Series in a two-game sweep and the Baltimore Orioles in a three-game sweep in the American League Division Series to advance to the American League Championship Series for the first time since 2011, in which they beat their division and Lone Star Series rival, and defending World Series champions Astros in seven games to claim their first pennant since 2011. They defeated the Arizona Diamondbacks in the fifth game of the World Series to claim their first title in franchise history. The Rangers went 13–4 in the postseason, going 2–4 at home and 11–0 on the road, the most road wins in a postseason in MLB history.

The Texas Rangers drew an average home attendance of 31,272 in 81 home games in the 2023 MLB season, the 16th highest in the league. The total attendance was 2,533,062.

== Offseason ==
On October 21, 2022, the Rangers hired Bruce Bochy to be their manager for the 2023 season.

== Regular season ==
The Rangers finished the 2022 season 68–94, an improvement on their 2021 record of 60–102. They finished 38 games out of 1st and missed the postseason for the sixth consecutive season.

=== Rule changes ===
Pursuant to the CBA, new rule changes were in place for the 2023 season:

- institution of a pitch clock between pitches;
- limits on pickoff attempts per plate appearance;
- limits on defensive shifts requiring two infielders to be on either side of second and be within the boundary of the infield; and
- larger bases (increased to 18-inch squares);

== Season standings ==
=== American League West ===
AL West
Team	W	L	Pct.	GB	Home	Road
Houston Astros	90	72	.556	—	39‍–‍42	51‍–‍30
Texas Rangers	90	72	.556	—	50‍–‍31	40‍–‍41
Seattle Mariners	88	74	.543	2	45‍–‍36	43‍–‍38
Los Angeles Angels	73	89	.451	17	38‍–‍43	35‍–‍46
Oakland Athletics	50	112	.309	40	26‍–‍55	24‍–‍57

=== American League Wild Card ===
Division leaders
Team	W	L	Pct.
Baltimore Orioles	101	61	.623
Houston Astros	90	72	.556
Minnesota Twins	87	75	.537

Wild Card teams (Top 3 teams qualify for postseason)
Team	W	L	Pct.	GB
Tampa Bay Rays	99	63	.611	+10
Texas Rangers	90	72	.556	+1
Toronto Blue Jays	89	73	.549	—
Seattle Mariners	88	74	.543	1
New York Yankees	82	80	.506	7
Boston Red Sox	78	84	.481	11
Detroit Tigers	78	84	.481	11
Cleveland Guardians	76	86	.469	13
Los Angeles Angels	73	89	.451	16
Chicago White Sox	61	101	.377	28
Kansas City Royals	56	106	.346	33
Oakland Athletics	50	112	.309	39

=== Record vs. opponents ===
==== Record vs. American League ====
2023 American League record Source: MLB Standings Grid – 2023
Team	BAL	BOS	CWS	CLE	DET	HOU	KC	LAA	MIN	NYY	OAK	SEA	TB	TEX	TOR	NL
Baltimore	—	7–6	4–2	3–4	6–1	3–3	5–1	5–2	4–2	7–6	6–1	4–2	8–5	3–3	10–3	26–20
Boston	6–7	—	2–4	3–3	5–1	2–5	5–2	3–4	4–3	9–4	4–2	3–3	2–11	3–3	7–6	20–26
Chicago	2–4	4–2	—	8–5	5–8	3–4	6–7	3–4	4–9	4–2	3–4	2–4	1–6	1–5	0–6	15–31
Cleveland	4–3	3–3	5–8	—	4–9	2–4	7–6	3–4	7–6	2–4	5–1	4–3	3–3	3–3	4–3	20–26
Detroit	1–6	1–5	8–5	9–4	—	3–3	10–3	3–3	8–5	2–5	3–4	3–3	1–5	3–4	2–4	21–25
Houston	3–3	5–2	4–3	4–2	3–3	—	1–5	9–4	2–4	2–5	10–3	4–9	3–3	9–4	3–4	28–18
Kansas City	1–5	2–5	7–6	6–7	3–10	5–1	—	2–4	4–9	2–4	2–4	1–6	3–4	1–5	1–6	16–30
Los Angeles	2–5	4–3	4–3	4–3	3–3	4–9	4–2	—	3–3	4–2	7–6	5–8	2–4	6–7	2–4	19–27
Minnesota	2–4	3–4	9–4	6–7	5–8	4–2	9–4	3–3	—	4–3	5–1	3–4	1–5	5–2	3–3	25–21
New York	6–7	4–9	2–4	4–2	5–2	5–2	4–2	2–4	3–4	—	5–1	4–2	5–8	3–4	7–6	23–23
Oakland	1–6	2–4	4–3	1–5	4–3	3–10	4–2	6–7	1–5	1–5	—	1–12	2–5	4–9	2–4	14–32
Seattle	2–4	3–3	4–2	3–4	3–3	9–4	6–1	8–5	4–3	2–4	12–1	—	3–4	4–9	3–3	22–24
Tampa Bay	5–8	11–2	6–1	3–3	5–1	3–3	4–3	4–2	5–1	8–5	5–2	4–3	—	2–4	7–6	27–19
Texas	3–3	3–3	5–1	3–3	4–3	4–9	5–1	7–6	2–5	4–3	9–4	9–4	4–2	—	6–1	22–24
Toronto	3–10	6–7	6–0	3–4	4–2	4–3	6–1	4–2	3–3	6–7	4–2	3–3	6–7	1–6	—	30–16

Updated with the results of all games through October 1, 2023.

==== Record vs. National League ====
2023 American League record vs. National League Source: MLB Standings
Team	ARI	ATL	CHC	CIN	COL	LAD	MIA	MIL	NYM	PHI	PIT	SD	SF	STL	WSH
Baltimore	2–1	1–2	1–2	1–2	2–1	1–2	3–0	1–2	3–0	1–2	2–1	1–2	2–1	1–2	4–0
Boston	2–1	3–1	2–1	1–2	1–2	1–2	0–3	2–1	2–1	2–1	0–3	2–1	1–2	0–3	1–2
Chicago	1–2	2–1	1–3	2–1	1–2	1–2	1–2	0–3	1–2	1–2	1–2	0–3	1–2	1–2	1–2
Cleveland	1–2	1–2	2–1	2–2	1–2	1–2	1–2	1–2	0–3	2–1	2–1	1–2	1–2	2–1	2–1
Detroit	0–3	1–2	1–2	1–2	2–1	1–2	1–2	2–1	3–0	0–3	2–2	1–2	3–0	2–1	1–2
Houston	3–0	3–0	3–0	0–3	3–1	1–2	2–1	1–2	2–1	1–2	2–1	2–1	1–2	2–1	2–1
Kansas City	1–2	0–3	1–2	0–3	1–2	2–1	0–3	0–3	3–0	1–2	0–3	2–1	2–1	2–2	1–2
Los Angeles	1–2	1–2	3–0	0–3	1–2	0–4	0–3	1–2	2–1	1–2	2–1	0–3	2–1	3–0	2–1
Minnesota	3–0	0–3	2–1	2–1	2–1	1–2	1–2	2–2	2–1	2–1	2–1	2–1	1–2	2–1	1–2
New York	2–1	0–3	1–2	3–0	1–2	2–1	1–2	1–2	2–2	2–1	2–1	2–1	2–1	1–2	1–2
Oakland	1–2	2–1	0–3	1–2	2–1	0–3	0–3	3–0	0–3	0–3	2–1	0–3	2–2	1–2	0–3
Seattle	2–1	1–2	1–2	1–2	3–0	0–3	2–1	0–3	1–2	1–2	2–1	3–1	2–1	2–1	1–2
Tampa Bay	2–1	1–2	1–2	2–1	3–0	2–1	3–1	2–1	1–2	0–3	3–0	1–2	2–1	1–2	3–0
Texas	1–3	1–2	1–2	0–3	3–0	1–2	3–0	0–3	2–1	3–0	2–1	0–3	2–1	2–1	1–2
Toronto	3–0	3–0	1–2	2–1	2–1	2–1	2–1	2–1	3–0	1–3	3–0	1–2	2–1	1–2	2–1

Updated with the results of all games through October 1, 2023.

=== Game log ===
Legend
Rangers Win	Rangers Loss	Game postponed	Clinched playoff spot

2023 Game Log: 90–72 (Home: 50–31; Away: 40–41)
March/April: 17–11 (Home: 11–5; Away: 6–6)

#	Date	Opponent	Score	Win	Loss	Save	Attendance	Record	Streak
1	March 30	Phillies	11–7	Ragans (1–0)	Soto (0–1)	—	38,387	1–0	W1
2	April 1	Phillies	16–3	Eovaldi (1–0)	Wheeler (0–1)	—	31,916	2–0	W2
3	April 2	Phillies	2–1	Pérez (1–0)	Falter (0–1)	Smith (1)	25,823	3–0	W3
4	April 3	Orioles	0–2	Coulombe (1–0)	Gray (0–1)	Bautista (2)	15,867	3–1	L1
5	April 4	Orioles	2–7	Gibson (2–0)	Heaney (0–1)	—	16,268	3–2	L2
6	April 5	Orioles	5–2	deGrom (1–0)	Voth (0–1)	Leclerc (1)	18,560	4–2	W1
7	April 7	@ Cubs	0–2	Stroman (2–0)	Eovaldi (1–1)	Fulmer (1)	29,094	4–3	L1
8	April 8	@ Cubs	3–10	Steele (1–0)	Pérez (1–1)	—	33,578	4–4	L2
9	April 9	@ Cubs	8–2	Gray (1–1)	Taillon (0–2)	—	28,807	5–4	W1
10	April 10	Royals	11–2	Heaney (1–1)	Greinke (0–3)	—	17,430	6–4	W2
11	April 11	Royals	8–5 (10)	Ragans (2–0)	Barlow (0–1)	—	17,760	7–4	W3
12	April 12	Royals	1–10	Keller (2–1)	Eovaldi (1–2)	—	18,380	7–5	L1
13	April 14	@ Astros	6–2	Pérez (2–1)	García (0–2)	—	39,343	8–5	W1
14	April 15	@ Astros	2–8	Brown (2–0)	Ragans (2–1)	—	39,257	8–6	L1
15	April 16	@ Astros	9–1	Burke (1–0)	Valdez (1–2)	—	39,122	9–6	W1
16	April 17	@ Royals	4–0	Dunning (1–0)	Lyles (0–3)	—	11,068	10–6	W2
17	April 18	@ Royals	12–2	Eovaldi (2–2)	Keller (2–2)	—	12,118	11–6	W3
18	April 19	@ Royals	12–3	Pérez (3–1)	Singer (1–2)	—	10,388	12–6	W4
19	April 21	Athletics	4–5	Jackson (1–1)	Smith (0–1)	Familia (1)	28,775	12–7	L1
20	April 22	Athletics	18–3	Heaney (2–1)	Fujinami (0–4)	—	32,388	13–7	W1
21	April 23	Athletics	5–2	deGrom (2–0)	Muller (0–2)	Smith (2)	34,916	14–7	W2
22	April 24	@ Reds	6–7	Díaz (1–1)	Leclerc (0–1)	—	8,810	14–8	L1
23	April 25	@ Reds	6–7	Sanmartin (1–0)	Kennedy (0–1)	Díaz (3)	9,969	14–9	L2
24	April 26	@ Reds	3–5	Sims (1–0)	Hernández (0–1)	—	10,256	14–10	L3
25	April 27	Yankees	2–4	Cole (5–0)	Heaney (2–2)	King (1)	31,325	14–11	L4
26	April 28	Yankees	5–2	Dunning (2–0)	Schmidt (0–3)	Smith (3)	36,341	15–11	W1
27	April 29	Yankees	2–0	Eovaldi (3–2)	Brito (2–3)	—	40,027	16–11	W2
28	April 30	Yankees	15–2	Pérez (4–1)	Cortés Jr. (3–2)	—	39,078	17–11	W3

May: 18–9 (Home: 5–3; Away: 13–6)

#	Date	Opponent	Score	Win	Loss	Save	Attendance	Record	Streak
29	May 2	Diamondbacks	6–4	Burke (2–0)	McGough (0–3)	Smith (4)	23,086	18–11	W4
30	May 3	Diamondbacks	7–12	Mantiply (1–0)	Sborz (0–2)	—	21,427	18–12	L1
31	May 5	@ Angels	4–5 (10)	Estévez (1–1)	Smith (0–2)	—	39,073	18–13	L2
32	May 6	@ Angels	10–1	Eovaldi (4–2)	Detmers (0–3)	—	37,409	19–13	W1
33	May 7	@ Angels	16–8	Sborz (1–1)	Suárez (1–2)	—	41,641	20–13	W2
34	May 8	@ Mariners	2–1	Gray (2–1)	Gilbert (1–2)	Smith (5)	15,282	21–13	W3
35	May 9	@ Mariners	0–5	Kirby (4–2)	Heaney (2–3)	—	17,638	21–14	L1
36	May 10	@ Mariners	4–3	Dunning (3–0)	Castillo (2–1)	Smith (6)	22,480	22–14	W1
37	May 11	@ Athletics	4–0	Eovaldi (5–2)	Medina (0–2)	Smith (7)	2,949	23–14	W2
38	May 12	@ Athletics	7–9 (10)	Fujinami (1–4)	Burke (2–1)	—	6,575	23–15	L1
39	May 13	@ Athletics	5–0	Gray (3–1)	Kaprielian (0–3)	—	8,230	24–15	W1
40	May 14	@ Athletics	11–3	Hernández (1–1)	Pruitt (0–1)	—	7,793	25–15	W2
41	May 15	Braves	0–12	Morton (5–3)	Bradford (0–1)	—	26,791	25–16	L1
42	May 16	Braves	7–4	Dunning (4–0)	Shuster (0–2)	Smith (8)	23,246	26–16	W1
43	May 17	Braves	5–6	Anderson (2–0)	Burke (2–2)	Iglesias (2)	30,053	26–17	L1
44	May 19	Rockies	7–2	Pérez (5–1)	Kauffmann (0–1)	—	30,819	27–17	W1
45	May 20	Rockies	11–5	Gray (4–1)	Freeland (4–5)	—	34,443	28–17	W2
46	May 21	Rockies	13–3	Heaney (3–3)	Seabold (1–1)	—	32,733	29–17	W3
47	May 22	@ Pirates	4–6	Ortiz (1–2)	Sborz (1–2)	—	10,574	29–18	L1
48	May 23	@ Pirates	6–1	Eovaldi (6–2)	Hill (4–4)	—	12,061	30–18	W1
49	May 24	@ Pirates	3–2	Pérez (6–1)	Oviedo (3–4)	Smith (9)	18,347	31–18	W2
50	May 26	@ Orioles	12–2	Gray (5–1)	Rodriguez (2–2)	—	20,293	32–18	W3
51	May 27	@ Orioles	5–3	Heaney (4–3)	Kremer (5–2)	—	37,939	33–18	W4
52	May 28	@ Orioles	2–3	Coulombe (2–1)	Ragans (2–2)	Bautista (13)	25,124	33–19	L1
53	May 29	@ Tigers	5–0	Eovaldi (7–2)	Boyd (3–4)	—	19,021	34–19	W1
54	May 30	@ Tigers	10–6	Anderson (1–0)	Faedo (1–3)	—	14,616	35–19	W2
55	May 31	@ Tigers	2–3	Vest (2–0)	Dunning (4–1)	Lange (10)	20,968	35–20	L1

June: 14–13 (Home: 10–8; Away: 4–5)

#	Date	Opponent	Score	Win	Loss	Save	Attendance	Record	Streak
56	June 2	Mariners	2–0	Gray (6–1)	Castillo (4–3)	Smith (10)	31,685	36–20	W1
57	June 3	Mariners	16–6	Sborz (2–2)	Woo (0–1)	—	34,435	37–20	W2
58	June 4	Mariners	12–3	Eovaldi (8–2)	Miller (3–3)	—	36,496	38–20	W3
59	June 5	Cardinals	4–3	Smith (1–2)	Cabrera (1–1)	—	25,161	39–20	W4
60	June 6	Cardinals	6–4	Dunning (5–1)	Liberatore (1–2)	Smith (11)	28,151	40–20	W5
61	June 7	Cardinals	0–1	Hicks (1–3)	Gray (6–2)	Helsley (7)	30,251	40–21	L1
62	June 9	@ Rays	3–8	Glasnow (1–0)	Heaney (4–4)	—	17,447	40–22	L2
63	June 10	@ Rays	8–4	Eovaldi (9–2)	Bradley (4–3)	—	18,932	41–22	W1
64	June 11	@ Rays	3–7	McClanahan (10–1)	Pérez (6–2)	—	23,069	41–23	L1
65	June 12	Angels	6–9 (12)	Bachman (1–0)	Ragans (2–3)	—	26,667	41–24	L2
66	June 13	Angels	3–7	Herget (1–2)	White (0–1)	Estévez (18)	25,832	41–25	L3
67	June 14	Angels	6–3	Sborz (3–2)	Herget (1–3)	—	25,406	42–25	W1
68	June 15	Angels	3–5	Ohtani (6–2)	Eovaldi (9–3)	Webb (1)	35,092	42–26	L1
69	June 16	Blue Jays	1–2	Gausman (6–3)	Pérez (6–3)	Romano (20)	23,069	42–27	L2
70	June 17	Blue Jays	4–2	Dunning (6–1)	Richards (0–1)	Smith (12)	39,383	43–27	W1
71	June 18	Blue Jays	11–7	King (1–0)	Pearson (4–1)	—	38,515	44–27	W2
72	June 19	@ White Sox	5–2	Heaney (5–4)	Banks (0–2)	Smith (13)	15,554	45–27	W3
73	June 20	@ White Sox	6–7	Graveman (2–3)	Anderson (1–1)	—	21,048	45–28	L1
74	June 21	@ White Sox	6–3	Pérez (7–3)	Kopech (3–6)	—	18,963	46–28	W1
75	June 23	@ Yankees	4–2 (10)	Barlow (1–0)	King (1–4)	Smith (14)	44,822	47–28	W2
76	June 24	@ Yankees	0–1	Severino (1–2)	Gray (6–3)	Marinaccio (2)	46,018	47–29	L1
77	June 25	@ Yankees	3–5	Marinaccio (4–3)	King (1–1)	King (5)	46,064	47–30	L2
78	June 26	Tigers	2–7	Englert (3–2)	Heaney (5–5)	—	22,320	47–31	L3
79	June 27	Tigers	8–3	Sborz (4–2)	White (1–2)	—	22,805	48–31	W1
80	June 28	Tigers	10–2	Dunning (7–1)	Wentz (1–9)	—	27,192	49–31	W2
81	June 29	Tigers	5–8	Englert (4–2)	Barlow (1–1)	—	26,977	49–32	L1
82	June 30	Astros	3–5	Blanco (2–0)	Gray (6–4)	Pressly (16)	39,174	49–33	L2

July: 11–13 (Home: 8–4; Away: 3–9)

#	Date	Opponent	Score	Win	Loss	Save	Attendance	Record	Streak
83	July 1	Astros	5–2	Eovaldi (10–3)	Brown (6–5)	—	40,380	50–33	W1
84	July 2	Astros	3–5	Neris (4–2)	Sborz (4–3)	Pressly (17)	39,580	50–34	L1
85	July 3	Astros	11–12	Abreu (3–2)	Smith (1–3)	Pressly (18)	38,936	50–35	L2
86	July 4	@ Red Sox	6–2	Dunning (8–1)	Ort (1–2)	Smith (15)	36,136	51–35	W1
87	July 5	@ Red Sox	2–4	Bello (6–5)	Gray (6–5)	Jansen (18)	31,568	51–36	L1
88	July 6	@ Red Sox	6–10	Winckowski (3–1)	Sborz (4–4)	—	33,847	51–37	L2
89	July 7	@ Nationals	7–2	Bradford (1–1)	Williams (5–5)	—	19,322	52–37	W1
90	July 8	@ Nationals	3–8	Irvin (2–5)	Heaney (5–6)	—	29,402	52–38	L1
91	July 9	@ Nationals	2–7	Corbin (6–10)	Dunning (8–2)	—	17,547	52–39	L2
93rd All-Star Game: Seattle, WA
92	July 14	Guardians	12–4	Burke (3–2)	Hentges (1–1)	—	33,863	53–39	W1
93	July 15	Guardians	2–0	Heaney (6–6)	Williams (1–2)	Chapman (3)	37,730	54–39	W2
94	July 16	Guardians	6–5	Bradford (2–1)	Stephan (4–4)	Smith (16)	33,957	55–39	W3
95	July 17	Rays	3–2	Chapman (5–2)	Fairbanks (0–3)	—	29,901	56–39	W4
96	July 18	Rays	5–3	Eovaldi (11–3)	Bradley (5–6)	Smith (17)	34,677	57–39	W5
97	July 19	Rays	5–1	Burke (4–2)	Littell (0–2)	—	31,591	58–39	W6
98	July 21	Dodgers	5–11	Brasier (2–0)	Speas (0–1)	—	39,808	58–40	L1
99	July 22	Dodgers	3–16	Miller (6–1)	Dunning (8–3)	—	40,738	58–41	L2
100	July 23	Dodgers	8–4	Pérez (8–3)	Sheehan (3–1)	—	39,632	59–41	W1
101	July 24	@ Astros	9–10	Pressly (3–2)	Speas (0–2)	—	37,973	59–42	L1
102	July 25	@ Astros	3–4	France (6–3)	Rodríguez (0–1)	Pressly (24)	40,520	59–43	L2
103	July 26	@ Astros	13–5	Heaney (7–6)	Valdez (8–7)	—	40,398	60–43	W1
104	July 28	@ Padres	1–7	Musgrove (10–3)	Dunning (8–4)	—	44,241	60–44	L1
105	July 29	@ Padres	0–4	Darvish (8–7)	Pérez (8–4)	—	42,677	60–45	L2
106	July 30	@ Padres	3–5	Snell (8–8)	Leclerc (0–2)	Hader (25)	42,943	60–46	L3

August: 15–12 (Home: 8–4; Away: 7–8)

#	Date	Opponent	Score	Win	Loss	Save	Attendance	Record	Streak
107	August 1	White Sox	2–0	Heaney (8–6)	Scholtens (1–4)	Smith (18)	28,988	61–46	W1
108	August 2	White Sox	11–1	Dunning (9–4)	Cease (4–5)	—	28,735	62–46	W2
109	August 3	White Sox	5–3	Scherzer (10–4)	Toussaint (1–4)	Smith (19)	29,804	63–46	W3
110	August 4	Marlins	6–2	Montgomery (7–9)	Luzardo (8–6)	—	33,362	64–46	W4
111	August 5	Marlins	9–8	Gray (7–5)	Weathers (1–7)	Smith (20)	38,583	65–46	W5
112	August 6	Marlins	6–0	Heaney (9–6)	Alcántara (4–10)	—	34,569	66–46	W6
113	August 7	@ Athletics	5–3	Sborz (5–4)	Jiménez (0–1)	Smith (21)	4,013	67–46	W7
114	August 8	@ Athletics	6–1	Scherzer (11–4)	Sears (2–9)	—	5,419	68–46	W8
115	August 9	@ Athletics	0–2	Tarnok (1–1)	Montgomery (7–10)	May (12)	6,372	68–47	L1
116	August 11	@ Giants	2–1	Gray (8–5)	Stripling (0–5)	Smith (22)	35,689	69–47	W1
117	August 12	@ Giants	9–3	Anderson (2–1)	Cobb (6–4)	—	33,112	70–47	W2
118	August 13	@ Giants	2–3 (10)	Doval (4–3)	Smith (1–4)	—	35,648	70–48	L1
119	August 14	Angels	12–0	Scherzer (12–4)	Sandoval (6–9)	—	27,743	71–48	W1
120	August 15	Angels	7–3	Montgomery (8–10)	Giolito (7–9)	—	26,166	72–48	W2
121	August 16	Angels	0–2	Detmers (3–9)	Gray (8–6)	Estévez (26)	31,004	72–49	L1
122	August 18	Brewers	8–9	Peguero (3–4)	Sborz (5–5)	Williams (29)	33,797	72–50	L2
123	August 19	Brewers	1–6	Peralta (10–8)	Dunning (9–5)	—	39,578	72–51	L3
124	August 20	Brewers	2–6	Houser (5–4)	Scherzer (12–5)	Williams (30)	37,138	72–52	L4
125	August 21	@ Diamondbacks	3–4 (11)	Ginkel (7–0)	Smith (1–5)	—	21,829	72–53	L5
126	August 22	@ Diamondbacks	3–6	Gallen (14–5)	Gray (8–7)	Sewald (27)	19,003	72–54	L6
127	August 24	@ Twins	5–7	Winder (2–0)	Sborz (5–6)	Jax (2)	23,333	72–55	L7
128	August 25	@ Twins	2–12	Gray (7–6)	Dunning (9–6)	—	25,144	72–56	L8
129	August 26	@ Twins	6–2	Burke (5–2)	Jax (5–8)	—	25,843	73–56	W1
130	August 27	@ Twins	6–7 (13)	Floro (5–6)	Hernández (1–2)	—	24,431	73–57	L1
131	August 28	@ Mets	4–3	Pérez (9–4)	Gott (0–4)	Leclerc (2)	21,696	74–57	W1
132	August 29	@ Mets	2–1	Stratton (2–1)	Smith (4–5)	Chapman (4)	29,353	75–57	W2
133	August 30	@ Mets	5–6 (10)	Brigham (1–2)	Chapman (5–3)	—	23,849	75–58	L1

September/October: 15–14 (Home: 8–7; Away: 7–7)

#	Date	Opponent	Score	Win	Loss	Save	Attendance	Record	Streak
134	September 1	Twins	1–5	Ryan (10–8)	Burke (5–3)	—	26,940	75–59	L2
135	September 2	Twins	7–9 (10)	Headrick (3–0)	Chapman (5–4)	Durán (24)	36,555	75–60	L3
136	September 3	Twins	6–5	Bradford (3–1)	Winder (2–1)	—	35,531	76–60	W1
137	September 4	Astros	6–13	Montero (5–5)	Sborz (5–7)	—	39,181	76–61	L1
138	September 5	Astros	1–14	Valdez (11–9)	Eovaldi (11–4)	—	33,678	76–62	L2
139	September 6	Astros	3–12	Verlander (11–7)	Scherzer (12–6)	—	36,417	76–63	L3
140	September 8	Athletics	3–6	Sweet (1–0)	Montgomery (8–11)	May (19)	28,203	76–64	L4
141	September 9	Athletics	3–2	Smith (2–5)	Erceg (3–4)	Chapman (5)	34,166	77–64	W1
142	September 10	Athletics	9–4	Heaney (10–6)	Medina (3–9)	—	26,189	78–64	W2
143	September 11	@ Blue Jays	10–4	Dunning (10–6)	Bassitt (14–8)	—	23,451	79–64	W3
144	September 12	@ Blue Jays	6–3	Scherzer (13–6)	Ryu (3–3)	—	30,479	80–64	W4
145	September 13	@ Blue Jays	10–0	Montgomery (9–11)	Kikuchi (9–6)	—	25,495	81–64	W5
146	September 14	@ Blue Jays	9–2	Bradford (4–1)	Gausman (11–9)	—	37,594	82–64	W6
147	September 15	@ Guardians	3–12	Giolito (8–13)	Gray (8–8)	—	21,043	82–65	L1
148	September 16	@ Guardians	1–2	López (3–7)	Smith (2–6)	Clase (41)	25,263	82–66	L2
149	September 17	@ Guardians	2–9	Williams (3–5)	Bradford (4–2)	—	19,361	82–67	L3
150	September 18	Red Sox	2–4	Winckowski (4–2)	Smith (2–7)	Martin (2)	27,375	82–68	L4
151	September 19	Red Sox	6–4	Chapman (6–4)	Murphy (1–2)	Leclerc (3)	26,617	83–68	W1
152	September 20	Red Sox	15–5	Pérez (10–4)	Bello (12–10)	—	28,519	84–68	W2
153	September 22	Mariners	8–5	Dunning (11–6)	Miller (8–6)	—	35,431	85–68	W3
154	September 23	Mariners	2–0	Montgomery (10–11)	Gilbert (13–7)	Chapman (6)	36,900	86–68	W4
155	September 24	Mariners	9–8	Eovaldi (12–4)	Woo (4–5)	Leclerc (4)	35,412	87–68	W5
156	September 25	@ Angels	5–1	Gray (9–8)	Herget (2–4)	—	25,208	88–68	W6
157	September 26	@ Angels	3–9	Detmers (4–10)	Bradford (4–3)	—	26,976	88–69	L1
158	September 27	@ Angels	5–0	Dunning (12–6)	Canning (7–8)	—	30,020	89–69	W1
159	September 28	@ Mariners	2–3	Muñoz (4–7)	Chapman (6–5)	—	43,817	89–70	L1
160	September 29	@ Mariners	0–8	Thornton (2–3)	Eovaldi (12–5)	—	45,274	89–71	L2
161	September 30	@ Mariners	6–1	Sborz (6–7)	Castillo (14–9)	—	44,694	90–71	W1
162	October 1	@ Mariners	0–1	Kirby (13–10)	Dunning (12–7)	Campbell (1)	43,997	90–72	L1

=== Detailed records ===
American League
Opponent	Home	Away	Total	Pct.	Runs scored	Runs allowed
AL East
Baltimore Orioles	1–2	2–1	3–3	.500	26	19
Boston Red Sox	2–1	1–2	3–3	.500	37	29
New York Yankees	3–1	1–2	4–3	.571	31	16
Tampa Bay Rays	3–0	1–2	4–2	.667	27	25
Toronto Blue Jays	2–1	4–0	6–1	.857	51	20
	11–5	9–7	20–12	.625	172	109
AL Central
Chicago White Sox	3–0	2–1	5–1	.833	35	16
Cleveland Guardians	3–0	0–3	3–3	.500	26	32
Detroit Tigers	2–2	2–1	4–3	.571	42	29
Kansas City Royals	2–1	3–0	5–1	.833	48	22
Minnesota Twins	1–2	1–3	2–5	.286	33	47
	11–5	8–8	19–13	.594	184	146
AL West
Houston Astros	1–6	3–3	4–9	.308	74	93
Los Angeles Angels	3–4	4–2	7–6	.538	80	51
Oakland Athletics	4–2	5–2	9–4	.692	80	40
Seattle Mariners	6–0	3–4	9–4	.692	63	44
Texas Rangers	—	—	—	—	—	—
	14–12	15–11	29–23	.558	297	228

National League
Opponent	Home	Away	Total	Pct.	Runs scored	Runs allowed
NL East
Atlanta Braves	1–2	0–0	1–2	.333	12	22
Miami Marlins	3–0	0–0	3–0	1.000	21	10
New York Mets	0–0	2–1	2–1	.667	11	10
Philadelphia Phillies	3–0	0–0	3–0	1.000	29	11
Washington Nationals	0–0	1–2	1–2	.333	12	17
	7–2	3–3	10–5	.667	85	70
NL Central
Chicago Cubs	0–0	1–2	1–2	.333	11	14
Cincinnati Reds	0–0	0–3	0–3	.000	15	19
Milwaukee Brewers	0–3	0–0	0–3	.000	11	21
Pittsburgh Pirates	0–0	2–1	2–1	.667	13	9
St. Louis Cardinals	2–1	0–0	2–1	.667	10	8
	2–4	3–6	5–10	.333	60	71
NL West
Arizona Diamondbacks	1–1	0–2	1–3	.250	19	26
Colorado Rockies	3–0	0–0	3–0	1.000	31	10
Los Angeles Dodgers	1–2	0–0	1–2	.333	16	31
San Diego Padres	0–0	0–3	0–3	.000	4	16
San Francisco Giants	0–0	2–1	2–1	.667	13	7
	5–3	2–6	7–9	.438	83	90

== Postseason ==
=== Game log ===
2023 Postseason Game Log: 13–4 (Home: 2–4; Away: 11–0)
AL Wild Card Series vs. Rays: 2–0 (Home: 0–0; Away: 2–0)

#	Date	Opponent	Score	Win	Loss	Save	Attendance	Record
1	October 3	@ Rays	4–0	Montgomery (1–0)	Glasnow (0–1)	—	19,704	1–0
2	October 4	@ Rays	7–1	Eovaldi (1–0)	Eflin (0–1)	—	20,198	2–0

AL Division Series vs. Orioles: 3–0 (Home: 1–0; Away: 2–0)

#	Date	Opponent	Score	Win	Loss	Save	Attendance	Record
1	October 7	@ Orioles	3–2	Dunning (1–0)	Bradish (0–1)	Leclerc (1)	46,450	1–0
2	October 8	@ Orioles	11–8	Bradford (1–0)	Rodriguez (0–1)	—	46,475	2–0
3	October 10	Orioles	7–1	Eovaldi (2–0)	Kremer (0–1)	—	40,861	3–0

AL Championship Series vs. Astros: 4–3 (Home: 0–3; Away: 4–0)

#	Date	Opponent	Score	Win	Loss	Save	Attendance	Record
1	October 15	@ Astros	2–0	Montgomery (2–0)	Verlander (1–1)	Leclerc (2)	42,872	1–0
2	October 16	@ Astros	5–4	Eovaldi (3–0)	Valdez (0–2)	Leclerc (3)	42,879	2–0
3	October 18	Astros	5–8	Javier (2–0)	Scherzer (0–1)	Pressly (3)	42,368	2–1
4	October 19	Astros	3–10	Stanek (1–0)	Dunning (1–1)	—	42,060	2–2
5	October 20	Astros	4–5	Pressly (1–0)	Leclerc (0–1)	—	41,519	2–3
6	October 22	@ Astros	9–2	Eovaldi (4–0)	Valdez (0–3)	—	42,368	3–3
7	October 23	@ Astros	11–4	Montgomery (3–0)	Javier (2–1)	—	42,814	4–3

World Series vs. Diamondbacks: 4–1 (Home: 1–1; Away: 3–0)

#	Date	Opponent	Score	Win	Loss	Save	Attendance	Record
1	October 27	Diamondbacks	6–5 (11)	Leclerc (1–1)	Castro (0–1)	—	42,472	1–0
2	October 28	Diamondbacks	1–9	Kelly (3–1)	Montgomery (3–1)	—	42,500	1–1
3	October 30	@ Diamondbacks	3–1	Gray (1–0)	Pfaadt (0–1)	Leclerc (4)	48,517	2–1
4	October 31	@ Diamondbacks	11–7	Heaney (1–0)	Mantiply (2–1)	—	48,388	3–1
5	November 1	@ Diamondbacks	5–0	Eovaldi (5–0)	Gallen (2–3)	Sborz (1)	48,511	4–1

=== Postseason rosters ===
Playoff rosters
American League Wild Card Series

- Pitchers: 17 Nathan Eovaldi 25 José Leclerc 33 Dane Dunning 35 Chris Stratton 44 Andrew Heaney 45 Aroldis Chapman 46 Brock Burke 49 Matt Bush 51 Will Smith 52 Jordan Montgomery 54 Martín Pérez 65 Grant Anderson 66 Josh Sborz
- Catchers: 11 Austin Hedges 18 Mitch Garver 28 Jonah Heim
- Infielders: 2 Marcus Semien 5 Corey Seager 6 Josh Jung 30 Nathaniel Lowe 47 Josh Smith
- Outfielders: 3 Leody Taveras 4 Robbie Grossman 16 Travis Jankowski 32 Evan Carter 53 Adolis García

American League Division Series

- Pitchers: 17 Nathan Eovaldi 25 José Leclerc 33 Dane Dunning 35 Chris Stratton 44 Andrew Heaney 45 Aroldis Chapman 46 Brock Burke 49 Matt Bush 51 Will Smith 52 Jordan Montgomery 54 Martín Pérez 61 Cody Bradford 66 Josh Sborz
- Catchers: 11 Austin Hedges 18 Mitch Garver 28 Jonah Heim
- Infielders: 2 Marcus Semien 5 Corey Seager 6 Josh Jung 30 Nathaniel Lowe 47 Josh Smith
- Outfielders: 3 Leody Taveras 4 Robbie Grossman 16 Travis Jankowski 32 Evan Carter 53 Adolis García

American League Championship Series

- Pitchers: 17 Nathan Eovaldi 22 Jon Gray 25 José Leclerc 31 Max Scherzer 33 Dane Dunning 35 Chris Stratton 44 Andrew Heaney 45 Aroldis Chapman 51 Will Smith 52 Jordan Montgomery 54 Martín Pérez 61 Cody Bradford 66 Josh Sborz
- Catchers: 11 Austin Hedges 18 Mitch Garver 28 Jonah Heim
- Infielders: 2 Marcus Semien 5 Corey Seager 6 Josh Jung 30 Nathaniel Lowe 47 Josh Smith
- Outfielders: 3 Leody Taveras 4 Robbie Grossman 16 Travis Jankowski 32 Evan Carter 53 Adolis García

World Series

- Pitchers: 17 Nathan Eovaldi 22 Jon Gray 25 José Leclerc 31 Max Scherzer (Games 1–3) 33 Dane Dunning 35 Chris Stratton 44 Andrew Heaney 45 Aroldis Chapman 46 Brock Burke (Games 4–5) 51 Will Smith 52 Jordan Montgomery 54 Martín Pérez 61 Cody Bradford 66 Josh Sborz
- Catchers: 11 Austin Hedges 18 Mitch Garver 28 Jonah Heim
- Infielders: 2 Marcus Semien 5 Corey Seager 6 Josh Jung 20 Ezequiel Durán (Games 4–5) 30 Nathaniel Lowe 47 Josh Smith
- Outfielders: 3 Leody Taveras 4 Robbie Grossman 16 Travis Jankowski 32 Evan Carter 53 Adolis García (Games 1–3)

== Roster ==
2023 Texas Rangers
Roster
Pitchers: 65 Grant Anderson; 68 Joe Barlow; 61 Cody Bradford; 46 Brock Burke; 45 Aroldis Chapman; 48 Jacob deGrom; 33 Dane Dunning; 17 Nathan Eovaldi; 22 Jon Gray; 44 Andrew Heaney; 52 Taylor Hearn; 72 Jonathan Hernández; 36 Spencer Howard; 21 Ian Kennedy; 32 John King; 67 Jake Latz; 25 José Leclerc; 52 Jordan Montgomery; 49 Glenn Otto; 54 Martín Pérez; 50 Cole Ragans; 57 Yerry Rodríguez; 66 Josh Sborz; 31 Max Scherzer; 51 Will Smith; 58 Alex Speas; 35 Chris Stratton; 43 Owen White	Catchers: 18 Mitch Garver; 11 Austin Hedges; 28 Jonah Heim; 55 Sam Huff; 12 Sandy León; Infielders: 20 Ezequiel Durán; 6 Josh Jung; 30 Nathaniel Lowe; 13 Brad Miller; 36 Jonathan Ornelas; 5 Corey Seager; 2 Marcus Semien; 47 Josh H. Smith	Outfielders: 32 Evan Carter; 53 Adolis García; 4 Robbie Grossman; 16 Travis Jankowski; 50 J. P. Martínez; 3 Leody Taveras; 8 Bubba Thompson	Manager: 15 Bruce Bochy; Coaches: 27 Tony Beasley (third base); 86 Seth Conner (assistant hitting); 14 Donnie Ecker (bench/offensive coordinator); 87 Brett Hayes (bullpen); 75 Tim Hyers (hitting); 41 Mike Maddux (pitching); 64 Corey Ragsdale (first base); 83 Will Venable (associate manager); 88 Bobby Wilson (catching)

== Player statistics ==
= Indicates team leader

Indicates league leader

=== Batting ===
Note: G = Games played; AB = At bats; R = Runs; H = Hits; 2B = Doubles; 3B = Triples; HR = Home runs; RBI = Runs batted in; SB = Stolen bases; BB = Walks; AVG = Batting average; SLG = Slugging average

Player	G	AB	R	H	2B	3B	HR	RBI	SB	BB	AVG	SLG
Marcus Semien	162	670	122	185	40	4	29	100	14	72	.276	.478
Nathaniel Lowe	161	623	89	163	38	3	17	82	1	93	.262	.414
Adolis García	148	555	108	136	29	0	39	107	9	65	.245	.508
Leody Taveras	143	511	67	136	31	3	14	67	14	35	.266	.421
Josh Jung	122	478	75	127	25	1	23	70	1	30	.266	.467
Corey Seager	119	477	88	156	42	0	33	96	2	49	.327	.623
Jonah Heim	131	457	61	118	28	0	18	95	2	40	.258	.438
Ezequiel Durán	122	406	55	112	22	2	14	46	8	23	.276	.443
Robbie Grossman	115	353	56	84	23	1	10	49	1	57	.238	.394
Mitch Garver	87	296	45	80	11	0	19	50	0	44	.270	.500
Travis Jankowski	107	247	34	65	12	1	1	30	19	35	.263	.332
Josh Smith	90	195	29	36	8	1	6	15	1	25	.185	.328
Evan Carter	23	62	15	19	4	1	5	12	3	12	.306	.645
Brad Miller	27	56	8	12	4	0	1	6	0	10	.214	.339
Bubba Thompson	37	53	10	9	4	1	0	4	4	4	.170	.283
Sam Huff	21	43	5	11	2	0	3	6	0	2	.256	.512
Sandy León	21	41	4	6	2	0	0	4	0	1	.146	.195
J. P. Martínez	17	40	7	9	1	0	1	4	0	2	.225	.325
Austin Hedges	16	24	1	5	0	0	0	2	0	0	.208	.208
Jonathan Ornelas	8	7	2	1	0	0	0	0	0	0	.143	.143
Josh Sborz	1	1	0	0	0	0	0	0	0	0	.000	.000
Totals	162	5595	881	1470	326	18	233	845	79	599	.263	.452
Rank in AL	—	1	1	1	2	12	1	1	14	1	1	1

Source:Baseball Reference

=== Pitching ===
Note: W = Wins; L = Losses; ERA = Earned run average; G = Games pitched; GS = Games started; SV = Saves; IP = Innings pitched; H = Hits allowed; R = Runs allowed; ER = Earned runs allowed; BB = Walks allowed; SO = Strikeouts

Player	W	L	ERA	G	GS	SV	IP	H	R	ER	BB	SO
Dane Dunning	12	7	3.70	35	26	0	172.2	163	73	71	55	140
Jon Gray	9	8	4.12	29	29	0	157.1	149	75	72	54	142
Andrew Heaney	10	6	4.15	34	28	0	147.1	143	74	68	60	151
Nathan Eovaldi	12	5	3.63	25	25	0	144.0	117	59	58	47	132
Martín Pérez	10	4	4.45	35	20	0	141.2	150	74	70	49	93
Jordan Montgomery	4	2	2.79	11	11	0	67.2	61	21	21	13	58
Brock Burke	5	3	4.37	53	0	0	59.2	64	32	29	9	52
Will Smith	2	7	4.40	60	0	22	57.1	44	31	28	17	55
José Leclerc	0	2	2.68	57	0	4	57.0	37	19	17	28	67
Cody Bradford	4	3	5.30	20	8	0	56.0	56	33	33	12	51
Josh Sborz	6	7	5.50	44	0	0	52.1	43	33	32	17	66
Max Scherzer	4	2	3.20	8	8	0	45.0	28	16	16	15	53
Grant Anderson	2	1	5.05	26	0	0	35.2	38	20	20	14	30
Jonathan Hernández	1	2	5.40	33	0	0	31.2	35	20	19	15	34
Jacob deGrom	2	0	2.67	6	6	0	30.1	19	11	9	4	45
Chris Stratton	1	0	3.41	22	0	0	29.0	24	11	11	8	22
Aroldis Chapman	2	3	3.72	30	0	4	29.0	21	14	12	16	50
Cole Ragans	2	3	5.92	17	0	0	24.1	20	17	16	14	24
John King	1	1	5.79	15	0	0	18.2	26	12	12	4	10
Ian Kennedy	0	1	7.16	16	0	0	16.1	16	15	13	7	21
Yerry Rodríguez	0	1	7.90	13	1	0	13.2	20	12	12	6	15
Glenn Otto	0	0	10.13	6	0	0	10.2	14	12	12	6	11
Joe Barlow	1	1	4.66	13	0	0	9.2	13	5	5	2	6
Taylor Hearn	0	0	10.29	4	0	0	7.0	9	8	8	4	7
Jake Latz	0	0	0.00	3	0	0	6.1	1	0	0	3	5
Owen White	0	1	11.25	2	0	0	4.0	5	5	5	2	4
Austin Hedges	0	0	4.91	4	0	0	3.2	5	2	2	0	1
Spencer Howard	0	0	10.80	3	0	0	3.1	4	4	4	3	2
Brad Miller	0	0	13.50	1	0	0	2.0	2	3	3	2	0
Alex Speas	0	2	13.50	3	0	0	2.0	2	3	3	5	4
Sandy León	0	0	18.00	1	0	0	1.0	1	2	2	0	0
Totals	90	72	4.28	162	162	30	1436.1	1330	716	683	491	1351
Rank in AL	3	12	10	—	—	12	10	8	9	10	7	12

Source:Baseball Reference

== Farm system ==
Level	Team	League	Manager
Triple-A	Round Rock Express	Pacific Coast League	
Double-A	Frisco RoughRiders	Texas League	
High-A	Hickory Crawdads	South Atlantic League	
Low-A	Down East Wood Ducks	Carolina League	
Rookie	ACL Rangers	Arizona Complex League	
Foreign Rookie	DSL Rangers 1	Dominican Summer League	
Foreign Rookie	DSL Rangers 2	Dominican Summer League	
