= Cody Bradford =

American baseball player (born 1998)

Texas Rangers – No. 61
- Pitcher
- Born: February 22, 1998 (age 28); Aledo, Texas, U.S.
- Bats: Left Throws: Left

MLB debut
- May 15, 2023, for the Texas Rangers

MLB statistics (through 2026 season)
- Win–loss record: 10–11
- Earned run average: 4.29
- Strikeouts: 143
- Stats at Baseball Reference

Teams
- Texas Rangers (2023–2024, 2026–present)

Career highlights and awards
- World Series champion (2023)

Cody Daniel Bradford (born February 22, 1998) is an American professional baseball pitcher for the Texas Rangers of Major League Baseball (MLB). He made his MLB debut in 2023.

== Amateur career ==
Bradford attended Aledo High School in Aledo, Texas. He produced a 0.64 ERA with 87 strikeouts over 66 innings during his senior season of 2016. Undrafted out of high school, Bradford attended Baylor University and played college baseball for the Bears. He appeared in 15 games for Baylor in his freshman season of 2017; posting a 5–5 record with a 5.52 ERA and 43 strikeouts over 73 1/3 innings. He posted a 7–6 record with a 2.51 ERA and 87 strikeouts over 96 2/3 innings in his sophomore season of 2018. Bradford appeared in two games for the Chatham Anglers of the Cape Cod League in 2018, posting a 2.25 ERA over 8 innings. Bradford was named to the 2018 USA Baseball Collegiate National Team; posting a 1–0 record with a 0.00 ERA and 5 strikeouts over 5 innings. Bradford was named the 2018 Big 12 Conference Baseball Pitcher of the Year. Bradford appeared in 3 games for Baylor in 2019, before being shut down due to injury. He underwent surgery for Thoracic outlet syndrome on March 27 and missed the rest of the 2019 season.

== Professional career ==
Bradford was drafted by the Texas Rangers in the 6th round (175th overall) of the 2019 MLB draft. He signed with Texas for a $700,000 signing bonus, which was $418,000 over slot value. He did not play in a game in 2020 due to the cancellation of the minor league season because of the COVID-19 pandemic. Bradford was assigned to the Hickory Crawdads of the High-A East to open the 2021 season. With them, he posted a 4–4 record with a 4.23 ERA and 87 strikeouts over 67 2/3 innings. He was promoted to the Frisco RoughRiders of the Double-A Central in August. In 7 games for Frisco, he went 2–0 with a 3.89 ERA and 41 strikeouts over 34 2/3 innings. Bradford returned to Frisco for the 2022 season, going 10–7 with a 5.01 ERA and 124 strikeouts over 118 2/3 innings.

Bradford received a non-roster invitation to major league spring training in 2023. He opened the 2023 season with the Round Rock Express of the Triple-A Pacific Coast League. Bradford was named the PCL pitcher of the month for April after going 5–0 with a 0.64 ERA in 5 starts. On May 15, 2023, the Rangers selected Bradford’s contract and promoted him to the major leagues for the first time to start that day against the Atlanta Braves. In his MLB debut, Bradford allowed 6 runs over 5 innings. In 20 games (8 starts) during his rookie campaign, he compiled a 4–3 record and 5.30 ERA with 51 strikeouts across 56 innings pitched. After the season, Bradford won the PCL Pitcher of the Year Award.

Bradford began the 2024 season as part of Texas' rotation, recording a 3–0 record and 1.40 ERA across three starts. On April 14, 2024, he was placed on the injured list with back soreness. However, the injury was revealed to be a rib stress fracture on April 26, and Bradford was transferred to the 60–day injured list on May 23. He was activated on July 29. Bradford finished the season with a 6-3 record in 13 starts, tallying an ERA of 3.54 with 70 strikeouts in 76 1/3 innings pitched.

Bradford was placed on the injured list to begin the 2025 season due to a left elbow sprain. He was transferred to the 60-day injured list on April 8, 2025. On June 24, it was announced that Bradford would undergo season-ending elbow surgery; the procedure was later specified as internal brace surgery.

On August 5, 2026, Bradford was activated from the injured list in preparation for his season debut and return from surgery.

== Personal life ==
Bradford was the valedictorian of the 2016 Aledo High School class. Bradford graduated from Baylor University in 2019 with a degree in supply chain management. He married his wife, Madi, in December 2019.
