= Grant Anderson (baseball) =

American baseball player (born 1997)

Milwaukee Brewers – No. 56
- Pitcher
- Born: June 21, 1997 (age 29); Port Arthur, Texas, U.S.
- Bats: Right Throws: Right

MLB debut
- May 30, 2023, for the Texas Rangers

MLB statistics (through 2026 season)
- Win–loss record: 7–11
- Earned run average: 4.29
- Strikeouts: 185
- Stats at Baseball Reference

Teams
- Texas Rangers (2023–2024); Milwaukee Brewers (2025–present)

Grant Reed Anderson (born June 21, 1997) is an American professional baseball pitcher for the Milwaukee Brewers of Major League Baseball (MLB). He has previously played in MLB for the Texas Rangers. He made his MLB debut in 2023.

== Amateur career ==
Anderson attended West Orange-Stark High School in West Orange, Texas. Undrafted out of high school, he attended McNeese State University to play college baseball for the Cowboys. After posting a 13.80 earned run average (ERA) as a freshman, Anderson had a 8–0 win–loss record with a 2.30 ERA and 56 strikeouts over 62 2/3 innings as a sophomore. As a junior, Anderson pitched to a 4–7 record with a 3.86 ERA and 72 strikeouts over 81 2/3 innings pitched.

== Professional career ==
=== Seattle Mariners ===
The Seattle Mariners selected Anderson in the 21st round of the 2018 MLB draft. Anderson split his professional debut season of 2018 between the rookie-level Arizona League Mariners, Low-A Everett AquaSox, and Single-A Clinton LumberKings, going a combined 2–1 with a 1.38 ERA and 13 strikeouts over 13 innings.

=== Texas Rangers ===
On April 1, 2019, Anderson was traded to the Texas Rangers in exchange for Connor Sadzeck. He spent the 2019 season with the Hickory Crawdads of the Single-A South Atlantic League, going 7–4 with a 3.22 ERA and 50 strikeouts over 64 1/3 innings. He did not play in a game in 2020 due to the cancellation of the minor league season because of the COVID-19 pandemic.

Anderson split the 2021 season between Hickory (reclassified to the High-A East) and the Frisco RoughRiders of the Double-A Central, going a combined 2–4 with a 5.76 ERA and 61 strikeouts over 54 1/3 innings. His 2022 campaign was split between Frisco and the Round Rock Express of the Triple-A Pacific Coast League, with whom he posted a 5–0 combined record with a 3.48 ERA and 91 strikeouts over 67 1/3 innings. During the 2022 offseason, he played in the Puerto Rican Winter League for the Cangrejeros de Santurce, posting a 1–2 record with a 0.47 ERA and 24 strikeouts over 19 innings. Anderson opened the 2023 season moving between Frisco and Round Rock.

On May 29, 2023, Texas selected Anderson's contract and promoted him to the major leagues for the first time. In his major league debut on May 30, Anderson performed in a relief role, striking out the first four batters he faced. Anderson completed 2 2/3 innings, striking out seven before giving up a single to Miguel Cabrera, and recorded the win. In 26 relief outings during his rookie campaign, he logged a 5.05 ERA with 30 strikeouts across 35 2/3 innings pitched.

Anderson was optioned to Triple–A Round Rock to begin the 2024 season, but was recalled on April 7 to replace an injured Josh Sborz. He was optioned back to Round Rock on June 12 to make room for Brock Burke, and recalled again on July 4. In 23 games for Texas in 2024, Anderson struggled to an 8.10 ERA with 29 strikeouts across 26 2/3 innings pitched. Anderson was designated for assignment following the signing of Joc Pederson on December 30.

=== Milwaukee Brewers ===
On January 2, 2025, Anderson was traded to the Milwaukee Brewers in exchange for Mason Molina. He was optioned to the Triple-A Nashville Sounds to begin the season.

== Personal life ==
Anderson and his wife Kristan were married on New Year's Day in 2023. They have a son.
