= Josh Sborz =

American baseball player (born 1993)

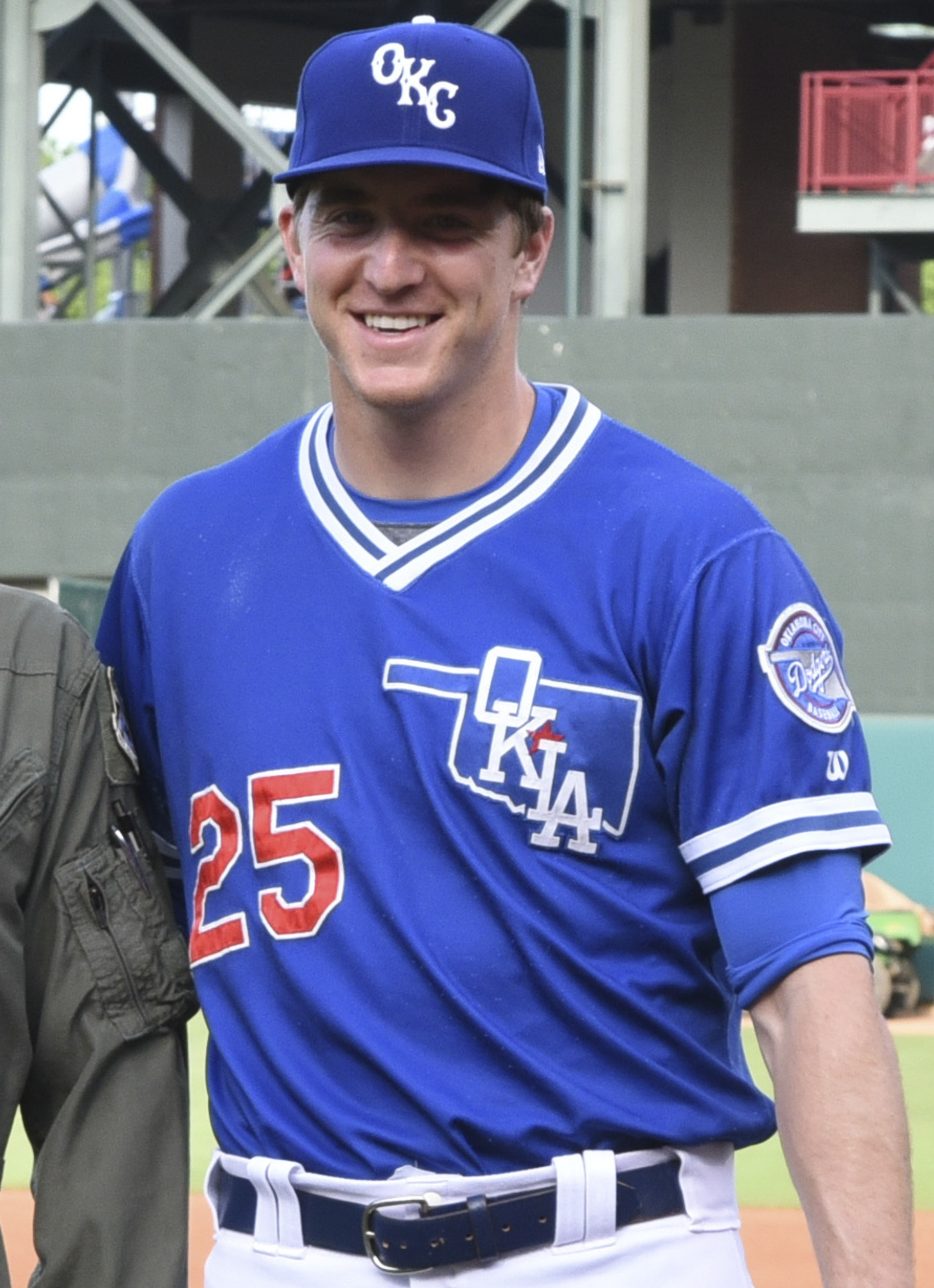
- Sborz with the Oklahoma City Dodgers in 2018

Free agent
- Pitcher
- Born: December 17, 1993 (age 32); Washington, D.C., U.S.
- Bats: Right Throws: Right

MLB debut
- June 20, 2019, for the Los Angeles Dodgers

MLB statistics (through 2024 season)
- Win–loss record: 13–13
- Earned run average: 4.96
- Strikeouts: 193
- Stats at Baseball Reference

Teams
- Los Angeles Dodgers (2019–2020); Texas Rangers (2021–2024)

Career highlights and awards
- World Series champion (2023)

Joshua Alan Sborz (/spɔːrz/ SPORZ; born December 17, 1993) is an American professional baseball pitcher who is a free agent. He has previously played in Major League Baseball (MLB) for the Los Angeles Dodgers and Texas Rangers. He was drafted 74th overall by the Dodgers in the 2015 MLB draft. Sborz played college baseball at the University of Virginia.

== Amateur career ==
Sborz attended McLean High School in McLean, Virginia. He played for the school's baseball team as a pitcher and an infielder, and received all-state and all-Met honors twice. Additionally, he was named Group AAA state Player of the Year in 2012. Sborz committed to playing college baseball at the University of Virginia.

As a freshman with the Cavaliers, Sborz mainly pitched out of the bullpen. He made 30 appearances for Virginia, which was the 10th most in team history. Sborz joined the UVA rotation during his sophomore season and made 15 starts. He started Game 3 of the College World Series finals against Vanderbilt. In 2013 and 2014, he played collegiate summer baseball with the Orleans Firebirds of the Cape Cod Baseball League.

For his junior season, Sborz was moved back to the bullpen and was named the team's closer. As a result of injuries to the starting rotation, Sborz made two starts towards the end of the regular season. He ended the regular season with a 2.49 ERA and was tied with Florida State's Billy Strode for the ACC lead in saves with 12. For his accomplishments, Sborz was named to the All-ACC second-team. On May 19, 2015, he threw a one-hit shutout against Georgia Tech in an ACC Tournament play-in game. Sborz was named the College World Series Most Outstanding Player following UVA's championship run in the 2015 College World Series. He recorded three wins and a save in four games; pitching 13 scoreless innings with 10 strikeouts, four walks and seven hits allowed.

== Professional career ==
=== Los Angeles Dodgers ===
The Los Angeles Dodgers selected Sborz in the second round of the 2015 MLB draft. The Dodgers announced his signing on July 8, 2015. He was assigned to the rookie level Ogden Raptors of the Pioneer League to start his career. After pitching in two games for the Raptors he was promoted to the Great Lakes Loons of the Single-A Midwest League. He also made two starts for the Loons and was 0–1 with a 2.84 ERA leading to his promotion again, to the High-A Rancho Cucamonga Quakes of the California League on August 14. In nine relief appearances for the Quakes he allowed two runs in 12 innings. He remained with the Quakes for the start of the 2016 season and pitched in 20 games, 19 of which were starts. He was 8–4 with a 2.66 ERA and was named to the mid-season and post-season California League All-Star teams as well as the league pitcher of the year. He was promoted to the Double-A Tulsa Drillers of the Texas League at the end of the season and made 10 relief appearances with them, for a 3.78 ERA.

Sborz spent all of 2017 with Tulsa where he started 24 games with an 8–8 record, 3.86 ERA and 81 strikeouts. In 2018, he appeared in 46 games (all in relief) for Tulsa and the Triple-A Oklahoma City Dodgers with a 4–2 record and 3.88 ERA with six saves. The Dodgers added Sborz to their 40-man roster after the 2018 season, in order to protect him from the Rule 5 draft.

Sborz was called up to the Majors for the first time on April 14, 2019, but was optioned back to Triple-A on April 20 without appearing in any games, briefly becoming a phantom ballplayer. He was called back up to the majors on June 20 and made his debut that night. After pitching a scoreless eighth inning. Sborz allowed three runs on two hits and a walk in the following inning without getting an out. He appeared in seven total games in the majors in 2019, pitching nine innings and allowing eight runs to score. Sborz spent most of the season with Triple-A Oklahoma City, where he was 4–3 with a 4.68 ERA in 50 innings (over 46 appearances) with three saves.

The minor league season was cancelled in 2020 due to the COVID-19 pandemic and Sborz spent most of the season at the Dodgers alternate training site, only appearing in four games in the Majors. He worked 4 1/3 innings, striking out two and walking one. The only run he allowed all season was a solo home run by Wil Myers of the San Diego Padres. Sborz was designated for assignment on February 11, 2021.

=== Texas Rangers ===
On February 16, 2021, Sborz was traded to the Texas Rangers in exchange for Jhan Zambrano. Over 59 innings for Texas in 2021, Sborz posted a 4–3 record with a 3.97 ERA while striking out 69 batters. Sborz split the 2022 season between Texas and the Round Rock Express of the Triple-A Pacific Coast League. With Texas he posted a 1–0 record with a 6.45 ERA over 22 1/3 innings; with Round Rock he went 3–0 with a 1.61 ERA over 22 1/3 innings.

Notably, Sborz was a member of the Texas Rangers' 2023 postseason run. He had a 0.75 ERA through 10 games, pitching 12 innings. Sborz pitched the last seven outs of the 2023 World Series, striking out Ketel Marte looking for the final out. It was the second save of Sborz's career.

Sborz was removed from a game against the Houston Astros on April 7, 2024, and placed on the 15-day injured list with a right rotator cuff strain. In 17 total appearances for Texas, he compiled a 3.86 ERA with 17 strikeouts over 16 1/3 innings pitched. On November 23, it was announced that Sborz had undergone shoulder debridement surgery that would sideline him for the first 2–3 months of the 2025 season. On September 7, 2025, the Rangers announced that Sborz would be shut down for the remainder of the season, after not making a single appearance. On November 21, he was non-tendered by Texas and became a free agent.

On January 20, 2026, Sborz re-signed with the Rangers organization on a minor league contract. He was released by the team on June 1. On June 4, Sborz re-signed with the Rangers organization on a new minor league contract. In 40 games between Triple-A and Double-A he threw 44.1 innings of relief going 4-1 with a 5.68 ERA with 43 strikeouts and one save. He elected free agency on November 2.

== Personal life ==
Josh's parents are John and Tina Sborz. He has two sisters, Chrissy and Heather, and an older brother, Jay, who pitched for eight years in the Detroit Tigers organization. Chrissy is a licensed insurance professional.

On November 12, 2020, he married Alexis Shaffer, a former women's soccer player who had been named Atlantic Coast Conference midfielder and offensive player of the year in 2016 and was selected 25th overall by FC Kansas City in the 2017 NWSL College Draft. They have two children together.
