= Alex Speas =

American baseball player (born 1998)

- Pitcher
- Born: March 4, 1998 (age 28); Powder Springs, Georgia, U.S.
- Batted: Right Threw: Right

MLB debut
- July 19, 2023, for the Texas Rangers

Last MLB appearance
- May 31, 2024, for the Houston Astros

MLB statistics
- Win–loss record: 0–2
- Earned run average: 9.00
- Strikeouts: 6
- Stats at Baseball Reference

Teams
- Texas Rangers (2023); Houston Astros (2024)

Alex JoVaughn Speas (born March 4, 1998) is an American former professional baseball pitcher. He played in Major League Baseball (MLB) for the Texas Rangers and Houston Astros.

== Amateur career ==
Speas attended McEachern High School in Powder Springs, Georgia. Speas participated in the 2015 Under Armour All-America Baseball Game. He was rated as the 36th ranked prospect entering the 2016 MLB draft by Baseball America. He committed to play college baseball at Auburn University.

== Professional career ==
=== Texas Rangers ===
Speas was drafted by the Texas Rangers in the 2nd round, with the 63rd overall selection, of the 2016 MLB draft. He signed with Texas for a $1,024,900 signing bonus.

Speas spent his debut season of 2016 with the AZL Rangers of the Rookie-level Arizona League, recording eight scoreless innings over four appearances. In 2017, Speas played for the Spokane Indians of the Low–A Northwest League, going 1–6 with a 6.15 earned run average (ERA) over 33 2/3 innings in 16 games (7 starts). Speas was transitioned to a full-time relief role in 2018, and went 2–0 with a 2.20 ERA and 49 strikeouts over 28 2/3 innings for the Hickory Crawdads of the Single–A South Atlantic League. His season was cut short that June when he underwent Tommy John surgery after suffering a torn ulnar collateral ligament of elbow joint. Speas spent the majority of the 2019 season rehabbing his elbow to full health, making just two appearances for the AZL Rangers. Once returned to full health in 2019, Speas was clocked throwing as hard as 102 mph. Speas did not play in a game in 2020 due to the cancellation of the minor league season because of the COVID-19 pandemic. Speas split the 2021 season between the ACL Rangers and the Frisco RoughRiders of the Double-A Central, going a combined 2–3 with an 11.15 ERA over 15 1/3 innings.

Speas spent the 2022 season on the restricted list, as he stepped away from playing. He spent the year working as a coach/instructor at Combine Academy in Lincolnton, North Carolina, which brands itself as an international boarding school and professional sports performance center. Speas returned to the Rangers organization and was assigned back to Frisco to open the 2023 season. He was promoted to the Round Rock Express of the Triple-A Pacific Coast League on June 27, after posting a 3–0 record with a 0.64 ERA and 47 strikeouts over 28 1/3 innings.

After five games with Round Rock, on July 19, 2023, Texas selected Speas' contract and promoted him to the major leagues for the first time. He made his MLB debut that day versus the Tampa Bay Rays, throwing 1 2/3 scoreless innings in relief. He recorded 3 swinging strikeouts, including the first batter he faced, Wander Franco. In only three games for Texas, he struggled to a 13.50 ERA with four strikeouts in two innings pitched. On September 30, Speas was designated for assignment following the promotion of Matt Bush.

=== Oakland Athletics ===
On October 3, 2023, Speas was claimed off waivers by the Chicago White Sox. He was optioned to the Triple–A Charlotte Knights to begin the 2024 season. On April 5, 2024, Speas was designated for assignment following the promotion of Robbie Grossman.

On April 6, 2024, Speas was traded to the Oakland Athletics in exchange for cash considerations; he was subsequently assigned to the Triple-A Las Vegas Aviators. In 9 games for Las Vegas, he struggled to an 11.32 ERA with 15 strikeouts across 10 1/3 innings pitched. On May 8, Speas was designated for assignment by Oakland.

=== Houston Astros ===
On May 10, 2024, Speas was claimed off waivers by the Houston Astros. He made one appearance for Houston, allowing one run on two hits with two strikeouts in two innings of relief against the Minnesota Twins. Speas was designated for assignment following the promotion of Bryan King on June 22.

=== Boston Red Sox ===
On June 29, 2024, Speas was claimed off waivers by the Boston Red Sox and assigned to the Triple-A Worcester Red Sox. He was designated for assignment by Boston on July 27, after struggling to a 20.25 ERA in four games for Worcester. He cleared waivers and was sent outright to Worcester on July 30. Speas elected free agency following the season on November 4.

=== Minnesota Twins ===
On November 24, 2024, Speas signed a minor league contract with the Minnesota Twins. In 15 appearances for the Triple-A St. Paul Saints, he struggled to a 2-2 record and 11.12 ERA with 20 strikeouts and one save over 17 innings of work. Speas was released by the Twins organization on June 13, 2025.

=== Diablos Rojos del México ===
On July 5, 2025, Speas signed with the Diablos Rojos del México of the Mexican League. In two appearances for the team, he struggled to an 18.00 ERA with one strikeout over one inning of work. Speas was released by the Diablos on July 11.
