= Evan Carter =

American baseball player (born 2002)

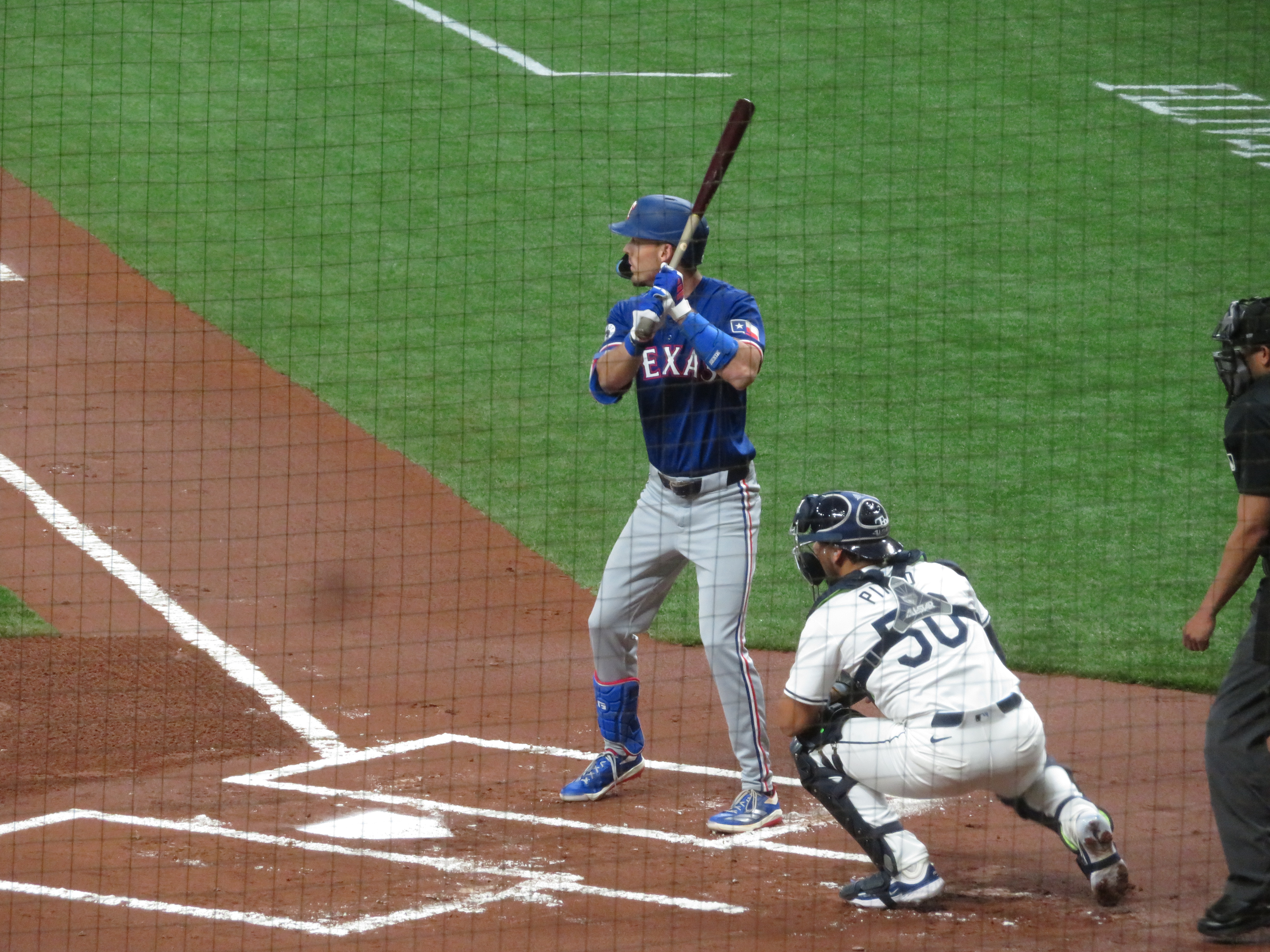
- Carter batting in 2024

Texas Rangers – No. 32
- Center fielder
- Born: August 29, 2002 (age 24); Elizabethton, Tennessee, U.S.
- Bats: Left Throws: Right

MLB debut
- September 8, 2023, for the Texas Rangers

MLB statistics (through 2026 season)
- Batting average: .215
- Home runs: 24
- Runs batted in: 92
- Stats at Baseball Reference

Teams
- Texas Rangers (2023–present)

Career highlights and awards
- World Series champion (2023)

Evan Jason Carter (born August 29, 2002) is an American professional baseball outfielder for the Texas Rangers of Major League Baseball (MLB). He made his MLB debut in 2023.

== Amateur career ==
Carter was born and grew up in Elizabethton, Tennessee and attended Elizabethton High School. He was an All-Conference selection in baseball in all three seasons he played. He committed to play college baseball at Duke after his sophomore year. As a junior, Carter batted .324 with four homers and 27 RBIs and was 10–2 with a 1.34 ERA and six complete games as a pitcher. Carter appeared in just 3 games before his senior season was cancelled due to the response to the COVID-19 pandemic.

== Professional career ==
=== Minor leagues ===
The Texas Rangers selected Carter in the second round, with the 50th overall selection, of the 2020 MLB draft and he received a $1.25 million signing bonus. MLB.com had not considered him a top-200 prospect and Baseball America had not rated him one of its top 500 prospects. Carter spent the 2021 season with the Down East Wood Ducks of the Low-A East, hitting .236/.438/.387/.825 with 2 home runs, 12 RBI, and 12 stolen bases over 32 games. In June 2021, Carter suffered a stress fracture in his lower back, which caused him to miss the remainder of that season. Carter split the 2022 season between the Hickory Crawdads of the High-A South Atlantic League and the Frisco RoughRiders of the Double-A Texas League, hitting a combined .295/.397/.489/.885 with 12 home runs, 73 RBI, and 28 stolen bases.

Carter was named the Texas Rangers 2022 Tom Grieve Player of the Year. He also received a 2022 minor league Rawlings Gold Glove Award. Carter was ranked as the 26th overall prospect in baseball by Baseball America, the 41st overall prospect by MLB Pipeline, and the 53rd overall prospect by The Athletic's Keith Law during the 2023 off-season.

Carter received a non-roster invitation to major league spring training in 2023 and returned to Frisco to open the season. Carter missed three weeks in June due to multiple arm injuries. Over 97 games for Frisco, he hit .284/.411/.451/.862 with 12 home runs, 62 RBI, and 22 stolen bases. Carter was promoted to the Round Rock Express of the Triple-A Pacific Coast League on August 29. Over 8 games, he hit .353/.436/.382/.818 with 3 RBI and 3 stolen bases.

=== Major leagues ===
On September 8, 2023, Texas selected Carter's contract and promoted him to the major leagues for the first time for his MLB debut that night versus the Oakland Athletics. Carter's debut included his first career walk, stolen base, and hit, a single off of Paul Blackburn. Carter hit his first major league home run on September 11 versus the Toronto Blue Jays Chris Bassitt. In 23 games in 2023, he batted .306/.413/.645 with five home runs, 12 RBI, and three stolen bases. Carter excelled for Texas in the 2023 postseason, hitting .300/.417/.500 with one home run, six RBI, and three stolen bases in 17 games as their starting left fielder. He recorded 9 doubles, a record for a single MLB postseason. Carter and the Rangers won the 2023 World Series, the first championship in franchise history.

Carter began the 2024 campaign with Texas, hitting .188 with five home runs and 15 RBI across 45 games. He was placed on the injured list with lower–back tightness on May 28, 2024, and was transferred to the 60–day injured list on July 29.

Carter was optioned to Triple-A Round Rock to begin the 2025 season. On May 18, he was moved to the injured list with a right quadriceps strain, and returned to the active roster on June 3. Carter spent two stints on the IL in August, firstly due to back spasms, and then due to a fractured right wrist. The Rangers later transferred Carter to the 60-day IL on August 28.

Carter played in a career-high 141 games in 2026, batting .194/.288/.315 with 9 home runs, 40 RBIs and 17 stolen bases.

== Personal life ==
He is married to Kaylen Carter. He is a Christian. Evan shadowed an endodontist and prepared for a possible career in dentistry by taking college courses during high school summer breaks.
