= 2023 World Series =

Major League Baseball's championship series

Team (Wins)	Managers	Season
Texas Rangers (4)	Bruce Bochy	90–72 (.556), GB: 0
Arizona Diamondbacks (1)	Torey Lovullo	84–78 (.519), GB: 16
- Dates: October 27 – November 1
- Venue(s): Globe Life Field (Arlington, Texas); Chase Field (Phoenix, Arizona)
- MVP: Corey Seager (Texas)
- Umpires: Vic Carapazza, Brian Knight, Alfonso Márquez, Bill Miller (crew chief), David Rackley, D. J. Reyburn, Quinn Wolcott

Broadcast
- Television: Fox (United States – English); Fox Deportes (United States – Spanish); MLB International (International)
- TV announcers: Joe Davis, John Smoltz, Ken Rosenthal, and Tom Verducci (Fox); Adrian Garcia Marquez, Edgar Gonzalez, Carlos Alvarez, and Jaime Motta (Fox Deportes); Dave Flemming and Ryan Spilborghs (MLB International – English)
- Radio: ESPN (United States – English); TUDN (United States – Spanish); KRLD (TEX – English); KFLC (TEX – Spanish); KMVP (AZ – English); KHOV (AZ – Spanish)
- Radio announcers: Jon Sciambi, Jessica Mendoza, Eduardo Pérez, and Buster Olney (ESPN); Jesus Acosta, Alberto Ferreiro, Jose Napoles, and Luis Quiñones (TUDN); Eric Nadel and Matt Hicks (KRLD); Eleno Ornelas and José Guzmán (KFLC); Greg Schulte, Chris Garagiola, and Tom Candiotti (KMVP); Oscar Soria and Rodrigo López (KHOV)
- ALCS: Texas Rangers over Houston Astros (4–3)
- NLCS: Arizona Diamondbacks over Philadelphia Phillies (4–3)

The 2023 World Series was the championship series of Major League Baseball's (MLB) 2023 season. The 119th edition of the World Series, it was a best-of-seven playoff between the National League (NL) champion Arizona Diamondbacks and the American League (AL) champion Texas Rangers. The series began on October 27 and ended on November 1 with Texas winning in five games. The Rangers won their first World Series title since their founding in 1961 and relocation to the DFW metroplex in 1971. This marked the first time since 1989 in which consecutive championships were won by different teams from the same state.

The Diamondbacks and Rangers entered the 2023 MLB postseason as wild cards, making this the third World Series meeting between two wild cards following 2002 and 2014. The Rangers had home-field advantage in the series due to their better regular season record. The Rangers and Diamondbacks split the first two games in Texas before the Rangers won three consecutive games in Arizona to win the series. Corey Seager won the World Series Most Valuable Player Award for the second time in his career.

== Background ==
This was the first postseason meeting between the Texas Rangers and the Arizona Diamondbacks. Both teams lost over 100 games in 2021. The teams' 174 combined wins is the lowest ever total for a non-shortened season World Series. This was first World Series between two Wild Card entrants since 2014. This was the third time in World Series history that the two teams that faced each other were both from the Expansion era, the first coming in 2015 and the second in 2019. This was the fifth straight World Series to have games played in a venue in Texas, with Houston co-hosting in 2019, 2021, and 2022, and Arlington hosting in 2020 due to the COVID-19 pandemic. Additionally, this was the only World Series from 2017–2025 to not feature either the Houston Astros or Los Angeles Dodgers.

The Diamondbacks won the regular season series 3–1, splitting a two-game series in May at Globe Life Field, and sweeping the Rangers at Chase Field in August. MLB has paired Arizona and Texas as interleague rivals from 1998 to 2000 and in 2013, 2019, and since 2023. As such, this was just the second World Series since the invention of interleague to feature natural rivals, joining the 2000 World Series between the New York Mets and New York Yankees.

This was the sixth World Series overall to be played entirely on artificial turf. Before 2023, the most recent of the six to be played in the two home team's stadiums was the 1993 World Series. However, the last "all-artificial turf" overall before 2023 had been at the neutrally located 2020 World Series, with all games played at Globe Life Field, in which the first two games of 2023 were also played. The 2023 Series is the second World Series to be played entirely on the second generation artificial turf (with 2020 being the first).

=== Arizona Diamondbacks ===
The Diamondbacks were just two seasons removed from a 110–loss season, which included an MLB-record 24 straight road losses. They had an uneven regular season in 2023, which included extreme highs and lows. At their peak in mid-June, they were 41–25 and leading the NL West. At their lowest, they had a 32-game stretch, where from early–July to mid–August, they went 7–25, a .219 win percentage, and had fallen to 57–59. They were led by a young core consisting of Corbin Carroll, Zac Gallen, Gabriel Moreno, Alek Thomas, and Geraldo Perdomo, along with veterans Ketel Marte, Merrill Kelly, Christian Walker, Lourdes Gurriel Jr., Tommy Pham, and Evan Longoria. The Diamondbacks team finished second in MLB in stolen bases behind the Cincinnati Reds, including 56 from Carroll. They were also the best defensive team during the season, committing the fewest errors in the regular season with 56 and tied for first with the Rangers with the best fielding percentage at .990.

The Diamondbacks qualified for the postseason as the sixth seed wild card entrant in the National League. In the Wild Card Series, they swept the third-seeded and National League Central division winner Milwaukee Brewers. In the Division Series, they swept and upset the National League West division winner, second-seeded, and 100–win Los Angeles Dodgers. In the National League Championship Series, they defeated the fourth-seeded and defending National League champion Philadelphia Phillies in seven games to win their second National League pennant and make it to the World Series for the first time since 2001. The 2023 Diamondbacks’ 84 wins were the fewest of any pennant winner since the 2006 St. Louis Cardinals, who won the pennant (and eventually the World Series) with only 83 wins, and became just the fourth team to win a league pennant with 85 or fewer wins (1973 New York Mets, 1987 Minnesota Twins, 2006 St. Louis Cardinals). The Diamondbacks also joined the 1987 Twins as the only two teams to win a pennant with a negative run differential. Arizona's revamped bullpen of Ryan Thompson, rookie Andrew Saalfrank, setup man Kevin Ginkel, and closer Paul Sewald, had a combined 1.45 ERA in 31 innings of work in the postseason entering the World Series.

At 125–1 preseason odds, Arizona had the third-longest odds to make a World Series since 1985 and longest since the Tampa Bay Rays in 2008, which Diamondbacks player Evan Longoria was also part of during his rookie season. Additionally, the 15-year gap between Longoria's first and second World Series appearances from 2008 to 2023 is the longest for a position player in MLB history.

=== Texas Rangers ===
From 2017–2022, the Rangers did not post a winning record. The Rangers spent heavily in the off-season on a pitching staff that ranked near the bottom of the league in 2022, by signing Jacob deGrom to a five-year, $185 million deal, bringing back Martin Pérez on a qualifying offer and signing Andrew Heaney to a two-year contract. During the regular season, the Texas Rangers got off to a historic start in their first 40 games, outscoring their opponents, 254–157, while going 25–15. Mid-season injuries to staff-aces Jacob deGrom and Nathan Eovaldi and subpar performance in the bullpen led the Rangers to acquire closer Aroldis Chapman, middle reliever Chris Stratton, and starting pitchers Jordan Montgomery and Max Scherzer. Despite leading the AL West for most of the season, poor play late in the year saw the team finish second in the division behind the Houston Astros; the teams had identical win-loss records, but Houston owned a better head-to-head record. They were led by an AL-best offense in runs scored and were tied with the Minnesota Twins in home runs. The Rangers also led the AL at the All-Star Game with six players in Adolis García, Jonah Heim, Josh Jung, Corey Seager, Marcus Semien, and Eovaldi.

The Rangers qualified for the postseason as the fifth seed wild card entrant in the American League just two years removed from a 102-loss season. In the Wild Card Series, they swept the fourth-seeded Tampa Bay Rays. In the Division Series, they swept the American League East division winner and top-seeded Baltimore Orioles. In the American League Championship Series, they defeated their division rival and defending World Series champion Houston Astros in seven games to win their third American League pennant in franchise history. The Rangers made it to the World Series for the first time since 2011, where they lost to the St. Louis Cardinals in seven games. The Rangers were heading in as the favorites to win the series for the first time all postseason while also seeking their first World Series title in franchise history, which would put an end to their World Series championship title drought of 62 seasons since their franchise began, the second-longest active championship drought in Major League Baseball behind the Cleveland Guardians, and the oldest active franchise without a World Series title. This also marked a return to the World Series for three-time World Champion Bruce Bochy, who returned to managing this season after being let go by San Francisco in 2019. He was looking to tie Walter Alston and Joe Torre for fourth on the list of World Series victories for managers.

Texas came into the season with 50–1 betting odds, which was tied for the seventh-longest odds to make a World Series since 1985.

== Summary ==
Texas won the series, 4–1.

Game	Date	Score	Location	Time	Attendance
1	October 27	Arizona Diamondbacks – 5, Texas Rangers – 6 (11)	Globe Life Field	4:02	42,472
2	October 28	Arizona Diamondbacks – 9, Texas Rangers – 1	Globe Life Field	2:59	42,500
3	October 30	Texas Rangers – 3, Arizona Diamondbacks – 1	Chase Field	2:51	48,517
4	October 31	Texas Rangers – 11, Arizona Diamondbacks – 7	Chase Field	3:18	48,388
5	November 1	Texas Rangers – 5, Arizona Diamondbacks – 0	Chase Field	2:54	48,511

== Matchups ==
=== Game 1 ===
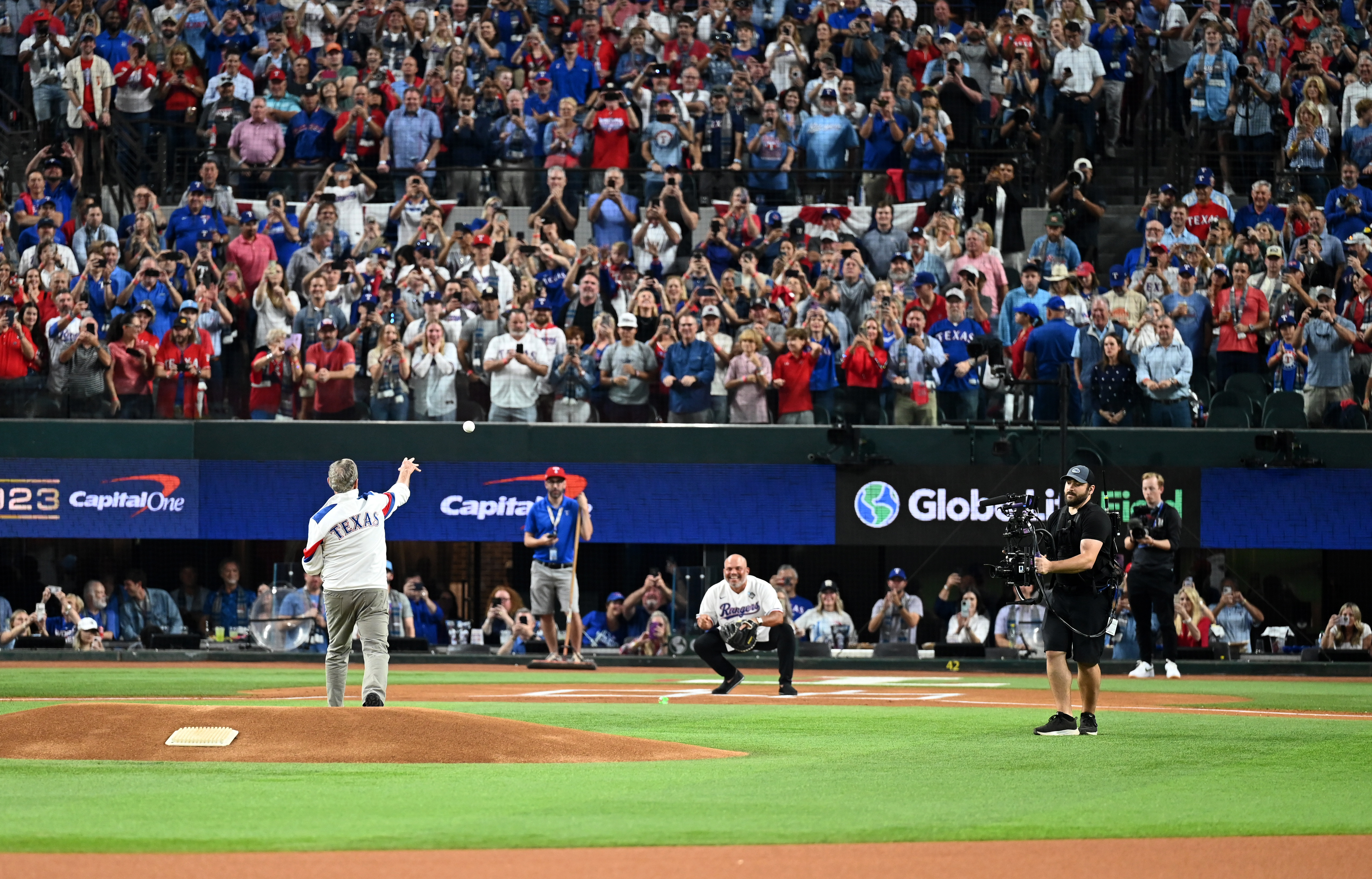
George W. Bush throwing a ceremonial first pitch to Iván Rodríguez prior to Game 1

Friday, October 27, 2023 7:07 pm (CDT) at Globe Life Field in Arlington, Texas 73 °F (23 °C), Roof Closed
Team	1	2	3	4	5	6	7	8	9	10	11	R	H	E
Arizona	0	0	3	1	1	0	0	0	0	0	0	5	8	0
Texas	2	0	1	0	0	0	0	0	2	0	1	6	9	0
WP: José Leclerc (1–0) LP: Miguel Castro (0–1); Home runs: AZ: Tommy Pham (1); TEX: Corey Seager (1), Adolis García (1); Attendance: 42,472; Boxscore

External videos
- Game 1 full replay on the MLB's official YouTube channel

R&B singer H.E.R. sang the national anthem. Former President of the United States and former Rangers part-owner George W. Bush threw out the ceremonial first pitch to former Rangers Hall of Fame catcher Iván Rodríguez. Nathan Eovaldi was the starting pitcher for Texas, while Zac Gallen started for Arizona.

Texas's Evan Carter hit a double off the base of the right field wall to score Corey Seager. Adolis García scored Carter with a single, making it 2–0 Texas. In the top of the third, with runners on second and third, Corbin Carroll tripled, scoring both runners and tying the game. Ketel Marte scored Carroll on a fielder's choice, giving Arizona a one-run lead. The Rangers loaded the bases in the bottom of the third, where Gallen walked Mitch Garver to tie the game at three. Gallen limited the damage as Jonah Heim flied out to end the inning. In the top of the fourth, Tommy Pham hit a solo home run, which gave Arizona a lead they would not give up until the bottom of the ninth. In the fifth, Marte added on a run for Arizona with a double that scored Geraldo Perdomo and took Eovaldi out of the game. In the bottom of the sixth, Gallen was replaced with Ryan Thompson. After Thompson walked Heim, Nathaniel Lowe hit a towering fly ball that was caught by Carroll on the warning track. If the ball had been hit out, it would have tied the game. Thompson was able to get out of the jam by striking out Leody Taveras. Arizona relievers Joe Mantiply and Kevin Ginkel kept the seventh and the eighth innings scoreless.

Will Smith retired the side in the top of the ninth, sending the game to the bottom of the ninth, where closer Paul Sewald was sent in to record the final three outs for Arizona. With Arizona still leading 5–3, Sewald gave up a leadoff walk to Taveras before striking out Marcus Semien. The next batter, Seager, hit a towering two-run home run to right field to tie the game at five. It was Sewald's first blown save of this postseason in seven opportunities; however, he then struck out Carter and Austin Hedges to send the game to extra innings. José Leclerc retired the side in the top of the tenth. The bottom of the tenth started well for Texas, with Kyle Nelson giving up a leadoff walk to Lowe. However, Josh Jung grounded into a double play. Nelson then walked Taveras and gave up a single to Semien, but got the hero of the ninth inning, Seager, to ground out, ending the inning. Leclerc once again retired the side in the top of the eleventh, giving Texas another chance to walk it off. After getting Carter to fly out in the bottom of the inning, Nelson was replaced with Miguel Castro, who was sent in to face García. On a 3–1 count, Garcia hit a walk-off home run to right field to win the game for Texas. With the home run, García recorded his 22nd RBI of the postseason, breaking the record for RBIs in a postseason, previously held by David Freese, who recorded 21 RBIs in the 2011 postseason.

=== Game 2 ===
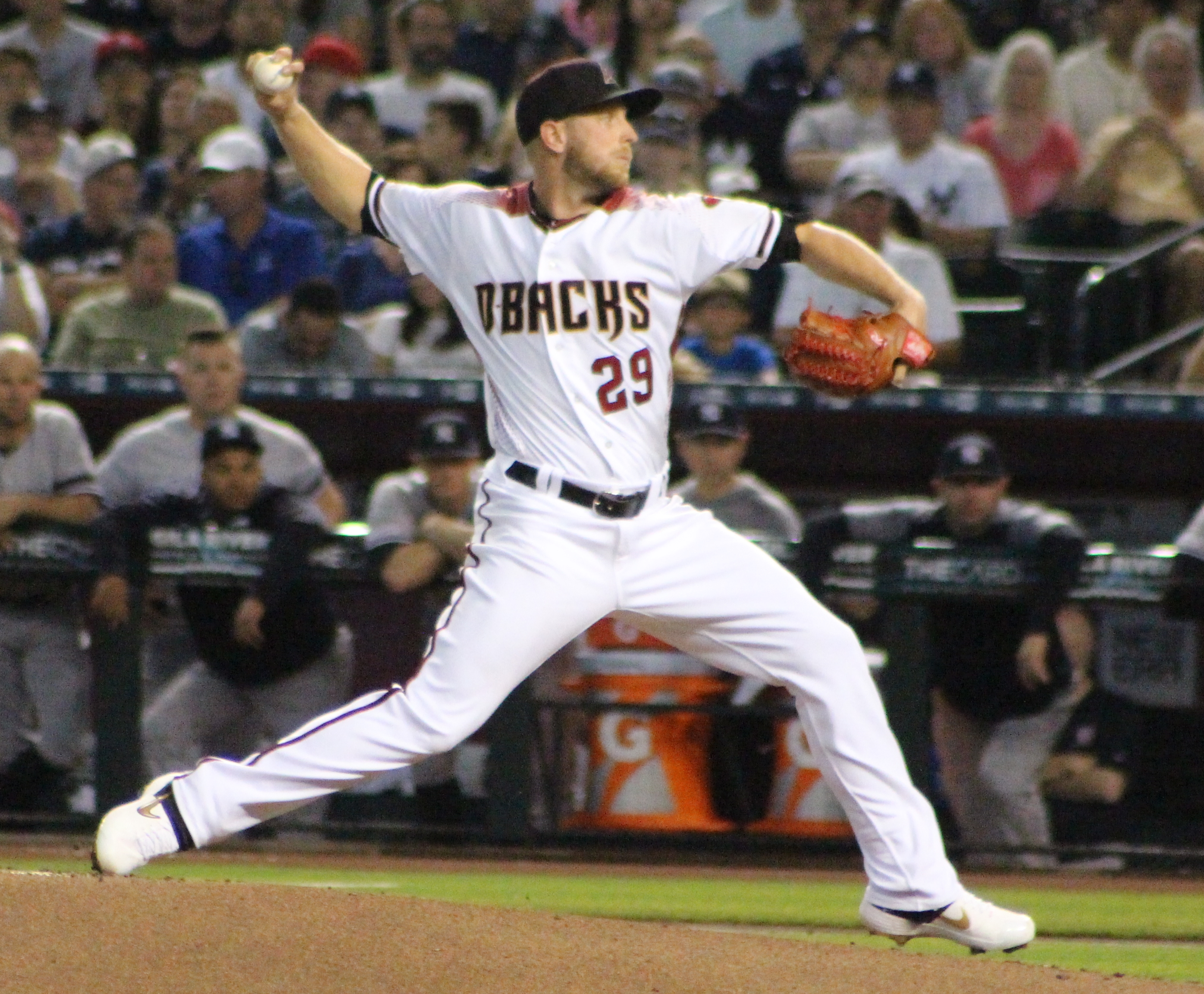
Arizona starter Merrill Kelly struck out nine batters in Game 2.

Saturday, October 28, 2023 7:03 pm (CDT) at Globe Life Field in Arlington, Texas 74 °F (23 °C), Roof Closed
Team	1	2	3	4	5	6	7	8	9	R	H	E
Arizona	0	0	0	2	0	0	2	3	2	9	16	0
Texas	0	0	0	0	1	0	0	0	0	1	4	0
WP: Merrill Kelly (1–0) LP: Jordan Montgomery (0–1); Home runs: AZ: Gabriel Moreno (1); TEX: Mitch Garver (1); Attendance: 42,500; Boxscore

The national anthem was sung by 18-year-old Pearle Peterson. Former Rangers Hall of Fame third baseman Adrián Beltré threw out the ceremonial first pitch to former Rangers Hall of Fame pitcher Ferguson Jenkins. Merrill Kelly started Game 2 for Arizona while Jordan Montgomery started for Texas.

Arizona opened the scoring in the fourth inning, when Gabriel Moreno hit a solo home run followed by a double by Tommy Pham and an RBI single by Lourdes Gurriel Jr. Mitch Garver hit a solo home run in the bottom of the fifth to put the Rangers on the board at 2–1, thereby cutting their deficit to one run. Arizona added two insurance runs in the seventh inning when an RBI single by Evan Longoria scored Alek Thomas, and another RBI single by Corbin Carroll scored Longoria. With the bases loaded in the eighth inning, Ketel Marte hit a two-run RBI single, and then Carroll hit an RBI single to expand the lead to 7–1. With his hit, Marte extended his postseason hitting streak to 18 games, setting a major league record. In the top of the ninth, Emmanuel Rivera hit a two-out two-run RBI single to score Jace Peterson and Gurriel Jr. to extend the Diamondbacks' lead to 9–1 before Rivera was out on a throw to second to end the inning. The Diamondbacks evened the series at one game apiece. Game 2 was the Diamondbacks’ first World Series road win, as even though they won the 2001 World Series, they dropped the three road games in that series.

=== Game 3 ===
Monday, October 30, 2023 5:03 pm (MST) at Chase Field in Phoenix, Arizona 78 °F (26 °C), Clear/Roof Open
Team	1	2	3	4	5	6	7	8	9	R	H	E
Texas	0	0	3	0	0	0	0	0	0	3	5	0
Arizona	0	0	0	0	0	0	0	1	0	1	6	0
WP: Jon Gray (1–0) LP: Brandon Pfaadt (0–1) Sv: José Leclerc (1); Home runs: TEX: Corey Seager (2); AZ: None; Attendance: 48,517; Boxscore

American Idol winner and Arizona native Jordin Sparks performed the national anthem before Game 3. Former Diamondback Hall of Fame pitcher Randy Johnson threw out the ceremonial first pitch to former Diamondback outfielder Luis Gonzalez. Brandon Pfaadt was the Game 3 starter for Arizona while Max Scherzer started for Texas.

Arizona threatened to score first in the second inning, but Christian Walker was thrown out at home plate by Adolis García. In the third inning, Marcus Semien hit an RBI single for Texas, followed by a two-run home run by Corey Seager, giving the Rangers a 3–0 lead. Scherzer exited the game in the middle of the fourth inning with back tightness; Jon Gray entered in relief. Ketel Marte extended his post-season record hitting streak to 19 straight games with a single in the sixth inning. Gray exited the game after three innings, giving up only one hit and striking out three, preserving the Rangers lead. Emmanuel Rivera doubled to lead off the eighth inning and later put the Diamondbacks on the board with an RBI single by Geraldo Perdomo, cutting their deficit to 3–1, but Aroldis Chapman forced Marte, representing the potential tying run at the plate, to ground into an inning-ending double play. José Leclerc came in to pitch a scoreless ninth inning for the save, giving the Rangers a 2–1 series lead. García left the game early with a side strain. With the win, Texas remained unbeaten (9–0) in road games this postseason.

=== Game 4 ===
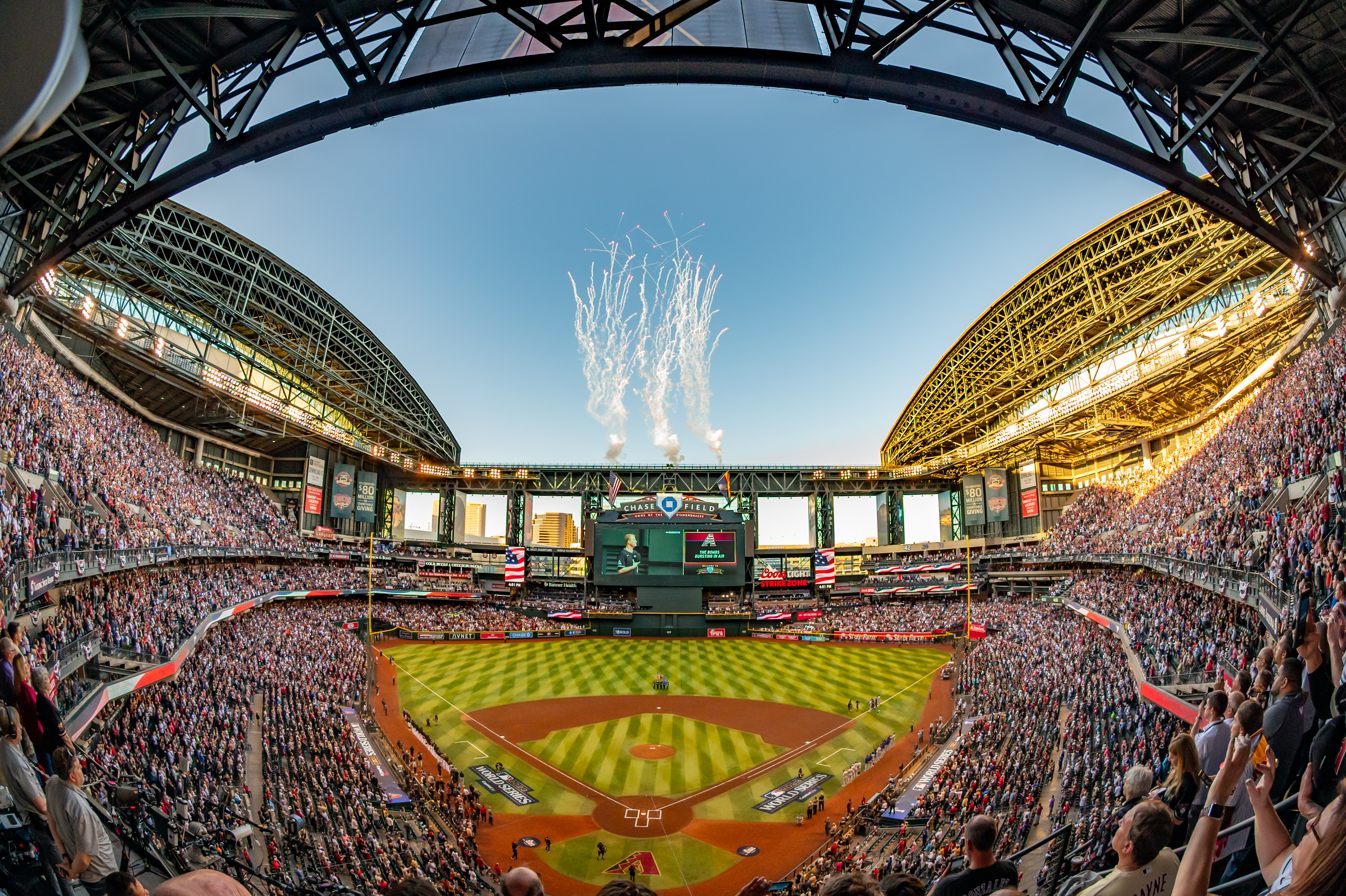
Chase Field from behind home plate prior to Game 4

Tuesday, October 31, 2023 5:03 pm (MST) at Chase Field in Phoenix, Arizona 77 °F (25 °C), Clear/Roof Open
Team	1	2	3	4	5	6	7	8	9	R	H	E
Texas	0	5	5	0	0	0	0	1	0	11	11	0
Arizona	0	0	0	1	0	0	0	4	2	7	12	1
WP: Andrew Heaney (1–0) LP: Joe Mantiply (0–1); Home runs: TEX: Corey Seager (3), Marcus Semien (1), Jonah Heim (1); AZ: Lourdes Gurriel Jr. (1); Attendance: 48,388; Boxscore

The national anthem was performed by country music artist Mickey Guyton. Arizona State University alumnus and former Masters Champion Jon Rahm threw out the ceremonial first pitch. Andrew Heaney started Game 4 for Texas while Arizona started Joe Mantiply as an opener. Before the start of Game 4, the Rangers replaced Adolis García and Max Scherzer on their World Series roster following their respective injuries in Game 3 with infielder Ezequiel Durán and relief pitcher Brock Burke.

Josh Jung led off the second inning for Texas with a double. After he advanced to third base, he scored the first run of the game off of a wild pitch by Miguel Castro, who relieved Mantiply. Leody Taveras drew a walk and Travis Jankowski hit a single, followed by a two-RBI triple by Marcus Semien. Kyle Nelson relieved Castro, and allowed a two-run home run to Corey Seager. Texas scored another five runs in the third inning after Jung and Nathaniel Lowe hit singles, Jonah Heim reached base on a fielder's choice to load the bases, Jankowski hit a two-RBI double, and Semien hit a three-run home run. All ten runs for Texas came with two outs. Arizona scored their first run on a sacrifice fly by Lourdes Gurriel Jr. in the fourth inning. Heim's home run leading off the top of the eighth inning extended the Rangers lead to 11–1. In the bottom half of the eighth inning, Tommy Pham hit an RBI sacrifice fly for Arizona, scoring Corbin Carroll, and Gurriel hit a three-run home run to reduce their deficit to 11–5. In the ninth inning, Will Smith recorded two outs, but the Diamondbacks put two men on base. José Leclerc entered the game and gave up a two-run RBI single to Gabriel Moreno, but finished the game with a pop-up by Christian Walker. With the win, the Rangers put themselves one win away from their first-ever World Series championship. This also extended the Rangers' 2023 postseason road win streak to ten games.

=== Game 5 ===
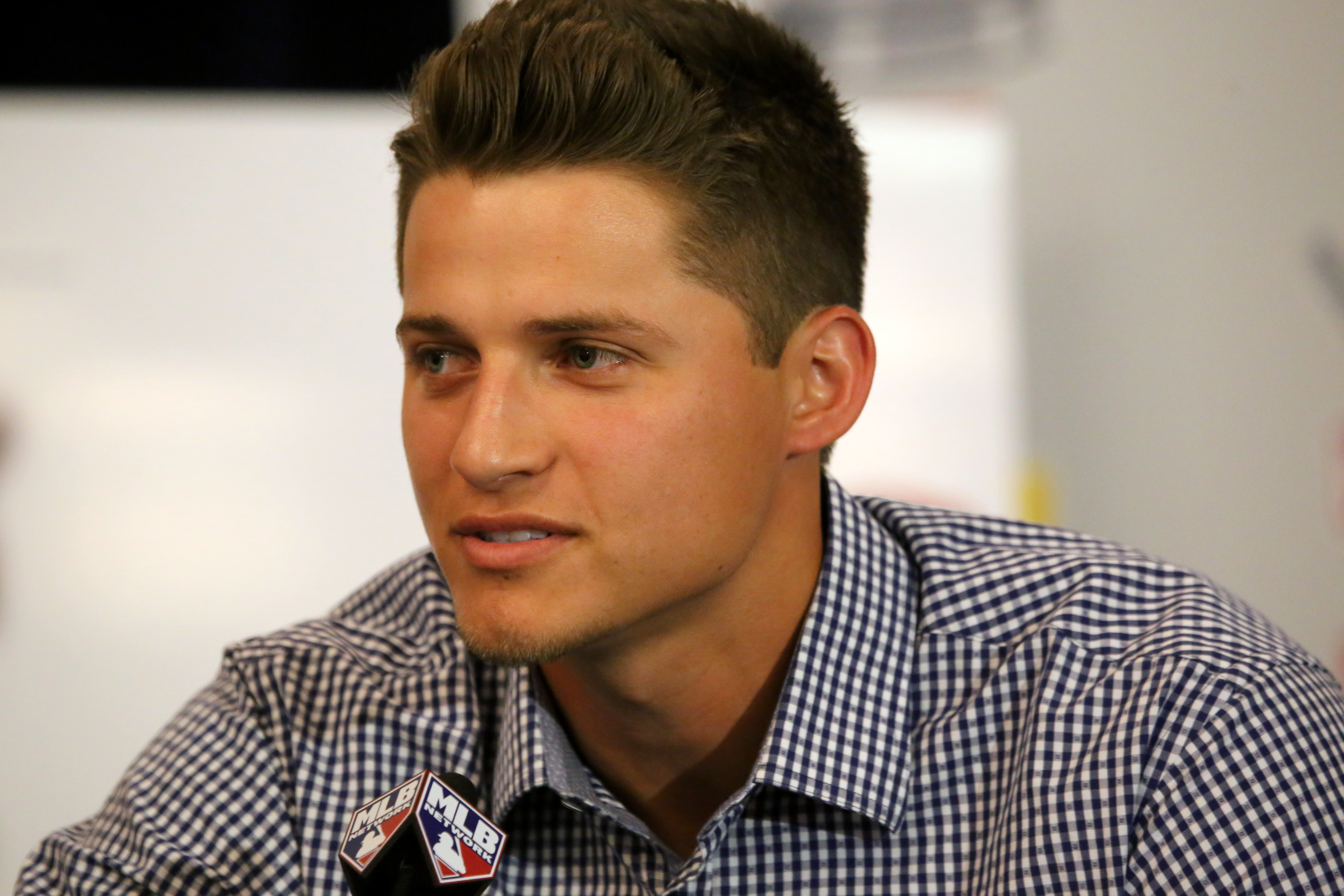
World Series MVP Corey Seager

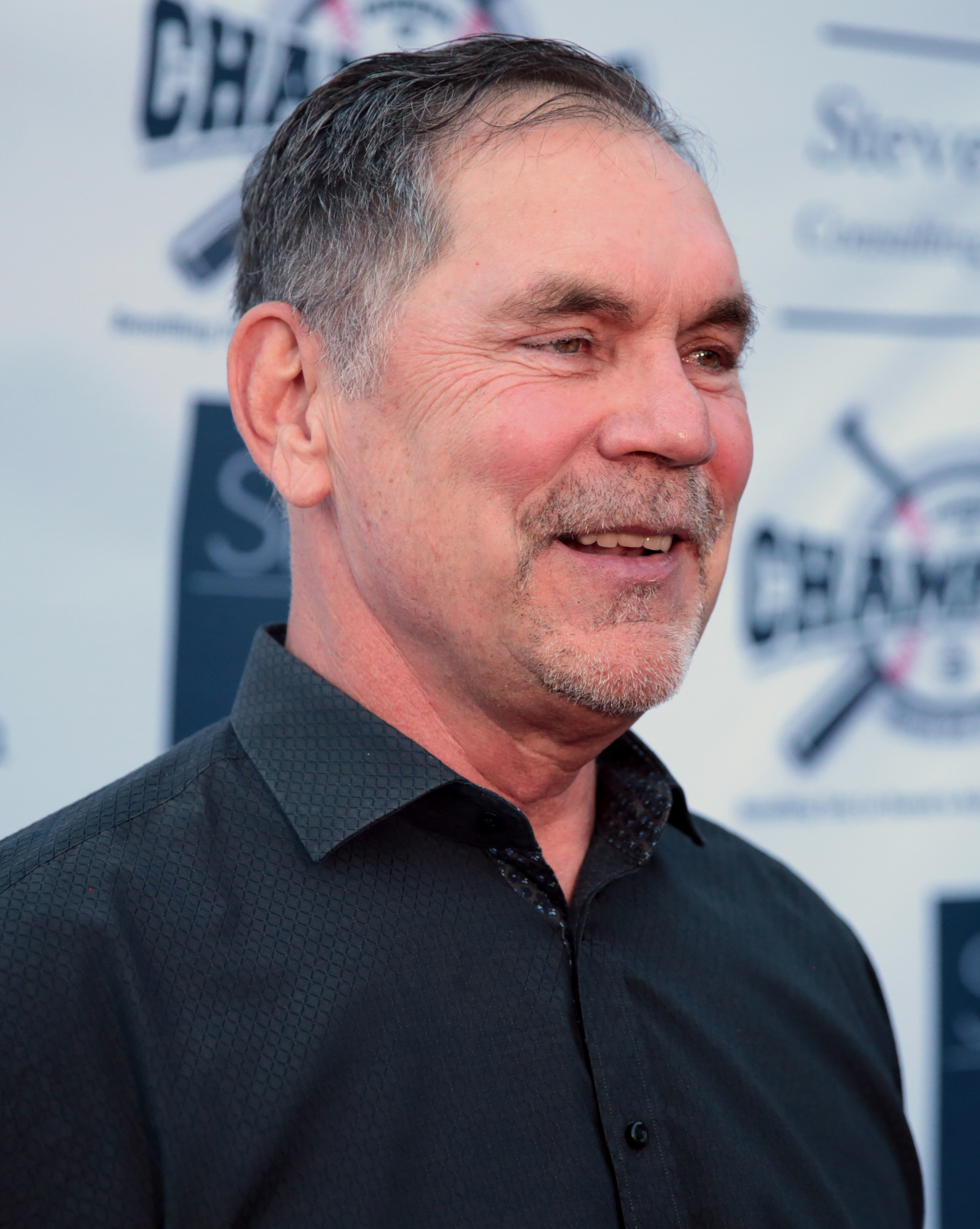
Rangers manager Bruce Bochy

Wednesday, November 1, 2023 5:06 pm (MST) at Chase Field in Phoenix, Arizona 79 °F (26 °C), Clear/Roof Open
Team	1	2	3	4	5	6	7	8	9	R	H	E
Texas	0	0	0	0	0	0	1	0	4	5	9	0
Arizona	0	0	0	0	0	0	0	0	0	0	5	1
WP: Nathan Eovaldi (1–0) LP: Zac Gallen (0–1) Sv: Josh Sborz (1); Home runs: TEX: Marcus Semien (2); AZ: None; Attendance: 48,511; Boxscore

The national anthem was performed by pop singer and Fifth Harmony member Dinah Jane. Tyler Moldovan, an officer in the Phoenix Police Department who was injured on duty, threw out the ceremonial first pitch. Game 5 featured a pitching rematch of Game 1 between Zac Gallen for the Diamondbacks and Nathan Eovaldi for the Rangers.

In a pitcher's duel, Gallen did not allow a hit in six innings. Meanwhile, Arizona had a scoring opportunity with runners on second and third base in the third inning, but Eovaldi retired Tommy Pham on a groundout. The Diamondbacks loaded the bases in the fifth inning but again failed to score. The Rangers ended Gallen's no-hit bid in the seventh inning on Corey Seager's single in left field; Seager scored on an RBI single by Mitch Garver. In the top of the eighth, Kevin Ginkel escaped the one-out bases-loaded jam to end the Rangers threat of another scoring opportunity. A single by Jonah Heim in the ninth inning, combined with a fielding error by Alek Thomas scored two more runs for Texas, and then Marcus Semien hit a two-run home run to expand the lead to 5–0. Josh Sborz recorded the final outs, with Ketel Marte striking out to conclude the season and his first save as the Rangers won the game and the first World Series championship in franchise history, ending a 63-year drought.

"Two balls, two strikes. Sborz kicks and fires - he struck him out looking! It's over! It's over! The Rangers have won the World Series! Ranger fans, you're not dreaming - the Rangers are the World Series champions! After 52 years in Texas, 63 years of the franchise, the wait is over, and the celebration has begun! ... May the ghosts of 2011 be forever erased!"

— Eric Nadel calling the final out of Game 5 and the series on 105.3 "The Fan" in Dallas

Corey Seager won the World Series Most Valuable Player Award, and was the first player ever to win the award in two different leagues, having previously won with the Los Angeles Dodgers in 2020. Additionally, he was the fourth player to win the award twice. In the Series, he hit .286, walked 3 times, hit 3 home runs, and got 6 runs batted in.Paul Sewald surrendered his second blown save in his eighth opportunity in this postseason to tie a record he shares with Robb Nen & Jeurys Familia.

Ketel Marte's 20-game postseason hit streak ended in Game 5, having walked three times and struck out once to end the World Series.

Texas manager Bruce Bochy won his fourth World Series championship; he also became the third manager ever to win World Series championships in both leagues, after Sparky Anderson and Tony LaRussa. Corey Seager, Nathan Eovaldi, Max Scherzer, and Aroldis Chapman all won their second World Series championship, while Will Smith won his third straight, becoming the first player in MLB history to win three straight on three different teams.

Texas finished the postseason with a perfect 11–0 record in road games, which was also the most road wins in a postseason in MLB history.

=== Composite line score ===
2023 World Series (4–1): Texas Rangers beat Arizona Diamondbacks.

Team	1	2	3	4	5	6	7	8	9	10	11	R	H	E
Arizona Diamondbacks	0	0	3	4	1	0	2	8	4	0	0	22	47	2
Texas Rangers	2	5	9	0	1	0	1	1	6	0	1	26	38	0
Home runs: AZ: Lourdes Gurriel Jr. (1), Gabriel Moreno (1), Tommy Pham (1); TEX: Corey Seager (3), Marcus Semien (2), Adolis García (1), Mitch Garver (1), Jonah Heim (1); Total attendance: 230,388 Average attendance: 47,078; Winning player's share: $506,263 Losing player's share: $313,634

== Broadcasting ==
=== Television ===
For the 24th consecutive year, the World Series was televised in the United States by Fox, including the local affiliates KSAZ-TV serving Phoenix and KDFW serving the Dallas metropolitan area. Play-by-play announcer Joe Davis called the event with Baseball Hall of Famer John Smoltz as color analyst, and Ken Rosenthal and Tom Verducci as field reporters. Kevin Burkhardt hosted the pregame and postgame shows, joined by analysts Derek Jeter, Alex Rodriguez, and David Ortiz. Fox Deportes aired the Spanish language telecast, with play-by-play announcer Adrian Garcia Marquez, analyst Edgar Gonzalez, and reporters Carlos Alvarez and Jaime Motta.

MLB International provided television coverage outside of the United States, using feeds remotely produced by MLB Network. The English-language world feed featured Dave Flemming on play-by-play and Ryan Spilborghs as an analyst.

==== Ratings ====
Viewership numbers include Fox and Fox Deportes.

Game	Ratings (households)	U.S. audience (in millions)	Ref
1	4.60	9.35	
2	4.00	8.38	
3	4.22	8.29	
4	4.53	8.65	
5	6.0	11.64	

The 2023 World Series was the least-watched World Series in television history, and Game 3 of the series was the least watched game in World Series television history. Analysts suggested that the relatively low national appeals for the Rangers and Diamondbacks affected the low viewership. Bob Thompson, the retired president of Fox Sports Networks, suggested that the Friday night start, a traditionally poor night for television viewing, also lowered viewership. Despite the low viewership, the World Series was the most watched television program in four of the five nights it was played. A Monday Night Football game on ESPN and ABC on October 30 was the only television program during the World Series to average more viewers. The subsequent 2024 World Series, which featured the Dodgers and Yankees and a much larger national appeal, but also started on a Friday night, was the most watched World Series since 2017.

=== Radio ===
For the 26th consecutive year, ESPN Radio aired the series in the United States. Jon Sciambi called the network's play-by-play of the event for the first time (taking over from Dan Shulman), with Jessica Mendoza and Eduardo Pérez as color analysts and Buster Olney as a field reporter.

TUDN Radio broadcast the series in Spanish, with an announcing crew including Jesus Acosta, Alberto Ferreiro, Jose Napoles, and Luís Quiñones. The flagship radio stations for both teams also broadcast the series locally. In Dallas, KRLD-FM and KFLC aired the games in English and Spanish respectively, while KMVP-FM and KHOV-FM did the same in Phoenix.

== Sponsorship ==
The 2023 World Series was sponsored by Capital One, as part of a multi-year agreement. This sponsorship included logo branding in-stadium and on official digital properties on the field, as well as commercial inventory during Fox's telecasts of the games.

== Aftermath ==
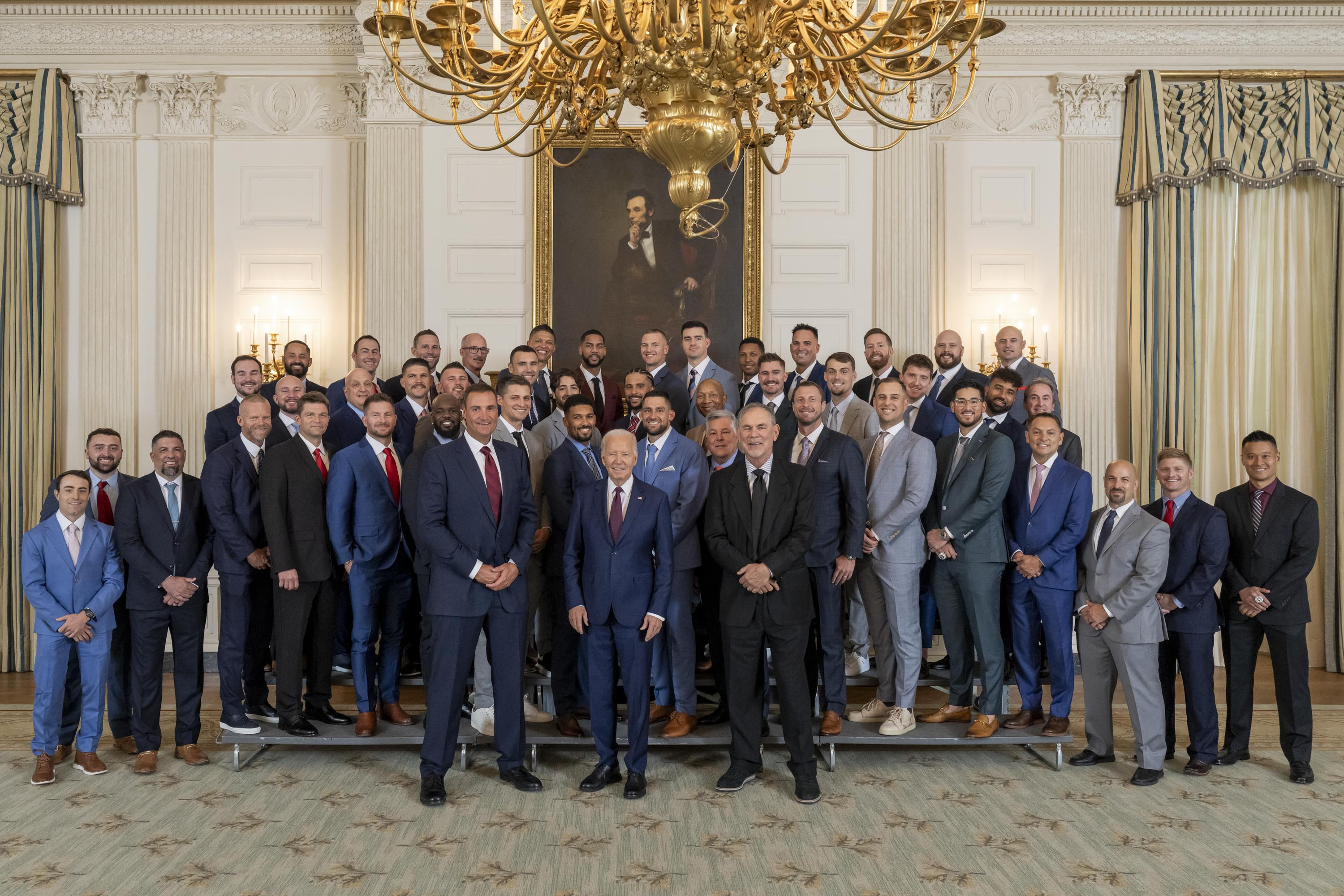
The 2023 World Series champion Texas Rangers at the White House.

This was the first major professional sports championship won by a team from the Dallas–Fort Worth metroplex since 2011, when the NBA's Dallas Mavericks won their first NBA championship. The Rangers held a victory parade in Arlington on November 3. Arlington's police department estimated a crowd of 250,000 to 300,000 prior to the parade, but an estimated crowd of 500,000 to 700,000 attended.

Jordan Montgomery would sign a free-agent contract with the Diamondbacks before the start of the 2024 season. He was the first player to sign with the opposing World Series team since Will Harris, formerly with the Astros, joined the Nationals after the 2019 World Series. Montgomery had a disastrous two-year tenure with the Diamondbacks, so much so that owner Ken Kendricks said he regretted the signing after Montgomery's first season with the club. He would end up missing the entirety of his second season due to Tommy John Surgery, and was eventually traded to the Brewers in July 2025.

In the regular season the following season, the Diamondbacks and Rangers split four games, with the Rangers sweeping at their ballpark in late May and the Diamondbacks sweeping in Arizona in September. Neither the Rangers nor Diamondbacks qualified for the 2024 postseason, marking the first time since 2007 that both teams from the previous year's World Series failed to make the playoffs the following year.

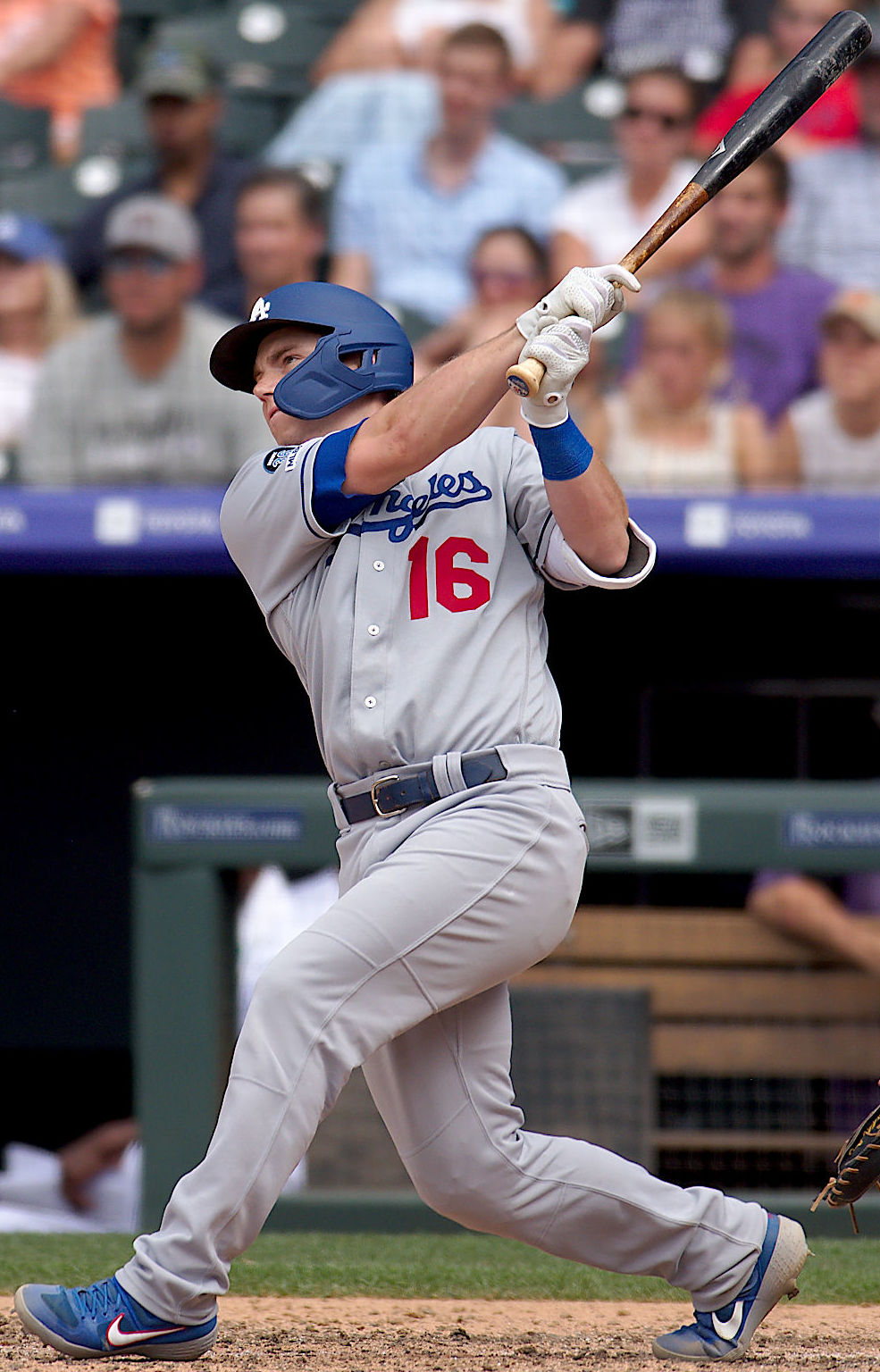
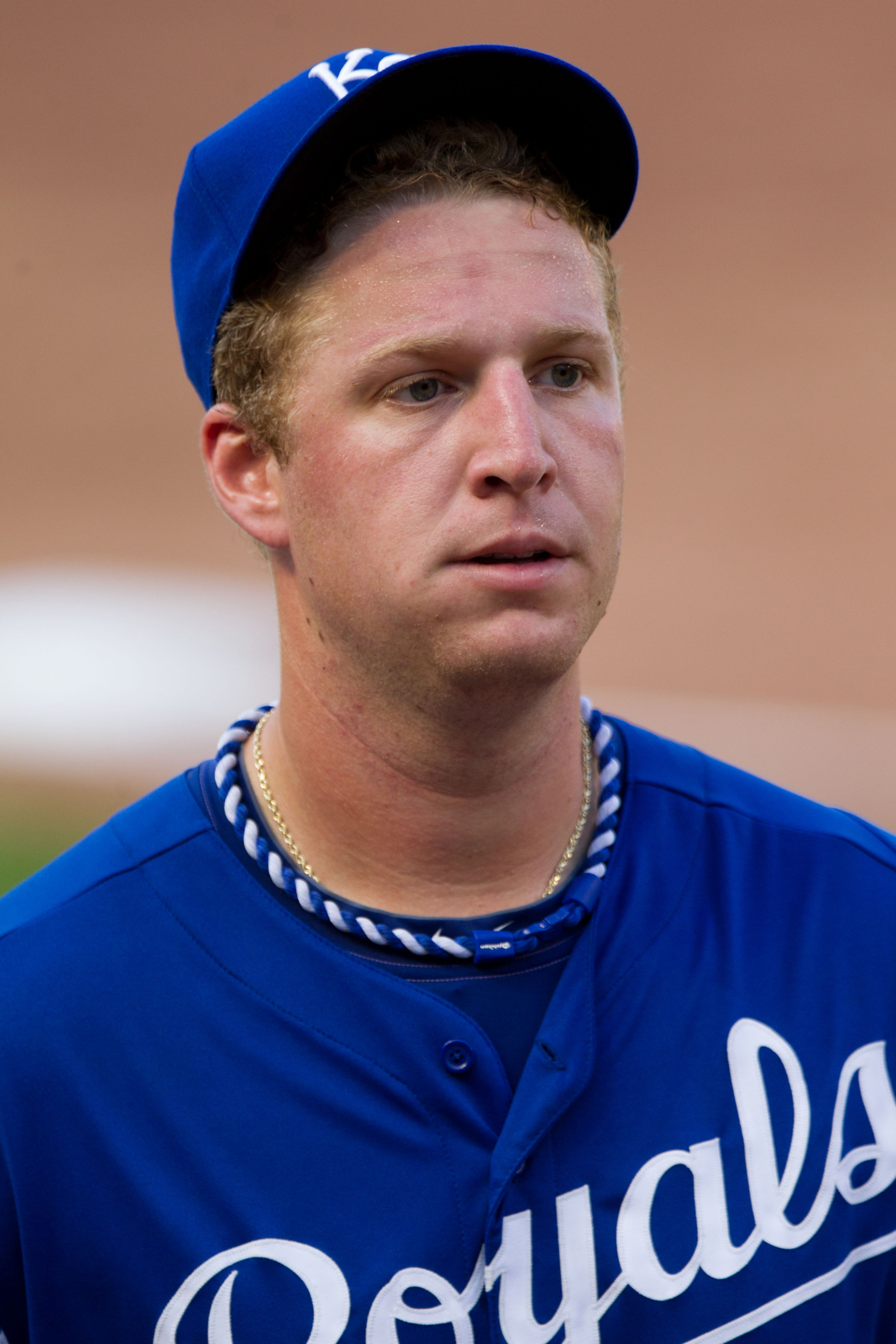
Catcher Will Smith (left) and reliever Will Smith (right)

=== 'Will Smith' World Series streak ===
Texas pitcher Will Smith became the first player in history to win three consecutive World Series championships with three different franchises, having previously won with the 2021 Atlanta Braves and the 2022 Houston Astros. His bid to win a fourth straight World Series came with Smith's homegrown club, the Kansas City Royals, as Smith signed there in the off-season. That bid ended when the Royals lost in the 2024 American League Division Series to the Yankees. In a remarkable coincidence, Los Angeles Dodgers catcher Will Smith (no relation) would win the World Series in 2024 and 2025, extending the 'Will Smith' streak. The streak began in 2020, which is when catcher Will Smith won his first World Series that season. The streak would be snapped in 2026 after neither the pitcher nor the catcher would make it back.

== See also ==
- 2023 Japan Series
- 2023 Korean Series
- Curse of Bob Short
