= Yerry Rodríguez =

Dominican baseball player (born 1997)

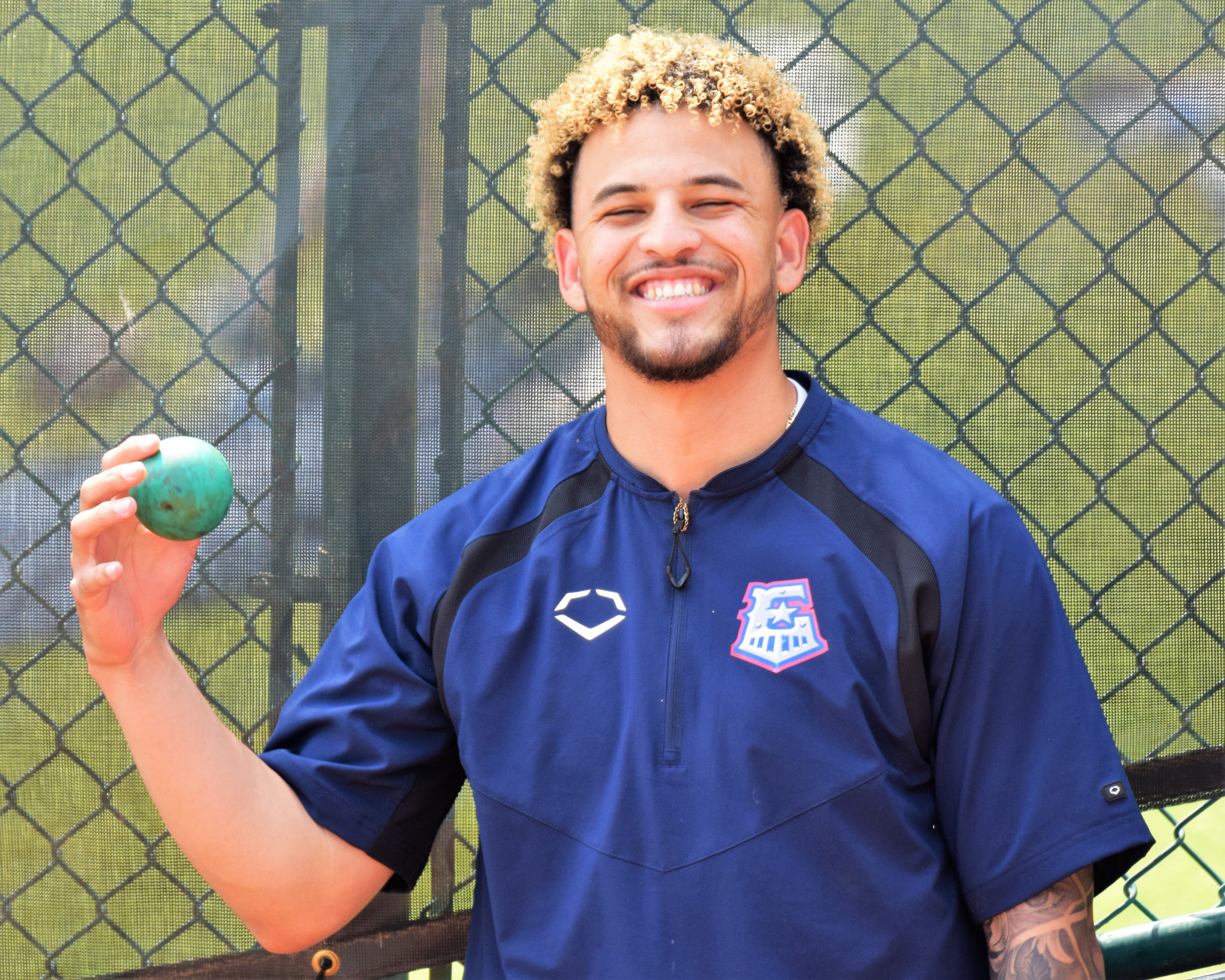
- Rodríguez with the Round Rock Express in 2022

New York Yankees
- Pitcher
- Born: October 15, 1997 (age 29); Santiago, Dominican Republic
- Bats: Right Throws: Right

MLB debut
- October 5, 2022, for the Texas Rangers

MLB statistics (through 2024 season)
- Win–loss record: 1–1
- Earned run average: 8.17
- Strikeouts: 33
- Stats at Baseball Reference

Teams
- Texas Rangers (2022–2024); Toronto Blue Jays (2024)

Yerry Manuel Rodríguez (born October 15, 1997) is a Dominican professional baseball pitcher in the New York Yankees organization. He has previously played in Major League Baseball (MLB) for the Texas Rangers and Toronto Blue Jays.

== Career ==
=== Texas Rangers ===
Rodríguez signed with the Texas Rangers as an international free agent on September 2, 2015. He made his professional debut in 2016 with the DSL Rangers of the Rookie-level Dominican Summer League, going 4–3 with a 2.66 ERA and 38 strikeouts over 50 2/3 innings. He returned to the DSL in 2017, going 1–0 with a 0.00 ERA and 3 strikeouts over just 6 innings. On June 9, 2017, Rodríguez was suspended 75 games after testing positive for Hydrochlorothiazide. He split the 2018 season between the AZL Rangers of the Rookie-level Arizona League and the Spokane Indians of the Low–A Northwest League, going a combined 5–2 with a 2.86 ERA and 82 strikeouts over 63 innings. Rodríguez spent the 2019 season with the Hickory Crawdads of the Single–A South Atlantic League, going 7–3 with a 2.08 ERA and 85 strikeouts over 73 2/3 innings. He suffered a right elbow UCL sprain in July 2019, which ended his season but did not require surgery. Rodríguez did not play in a game in 2020 due to the cancellation of the minor league season because of the COVID-19 pandemic.

On November 20, 2020, the Rangers added Rodríguez to their 40-man roster to protect him from the Rule 5 draft. He opened the 2021 season with the Frisco RoughRiders of the Double-A Central. After posting a 1–1 record with a 2.63 ERA and 63 strikeouts over 51 1/3 innings, he was promoted to the Round Rock Express of the Triple-A West. With Round Rock he struggled to a 3–3 record with a 8.01 ERA and 37 strikeouts over 30 1/3 innings. He spent the 2022 minor league season back with Round Rock, going 4–1 with a 4.27 ERA and 73 strikeouts over 59 innings.

On August 14, 2022, Rodríguez was promoted to the major leagues for the first time. He went unused out of the bullpen and was optioned back to Round Rock on August 16. On October 3, Rodríguez was promoted back to the major leagues. On October 5, Rodríguez made his major league debut, pitching a scoreless inning in relief against the New York Yankees.

Rodríguez was optioned to Triple-A Round Rock to begin the 2023 season. In 13 games for Texas, he struggled to a 7.90 ERA with 15 strikeouts across 13 2/3 innings pitched. Rodríguez made 12 appearances for the Rangers in 2024, compiling a 6.88 ERA with 12 strikeouts across 17 innings of work. He was designated for assignment by the Rangers on June 26, 2024.

=== Toronto Blue Jays ===
On June 30, 2024, Rodríguez was traded to the Toronto Blue Jays in exchange for Josh Mollerus. In 4 games for Toronto, he struggled to a 15.43 ERA with 5 strikeouts over 4 2/3 innings pitched. Rodríguez was designated for assignment by the Blue Jays on September 12. He cleared waivers and was sent outright to the Triple–A Buffalo Bisons on September 15. Rodríguez elected free agency following the season on November 4.

On November 18, 2024, Rodríguez signed a minor league contract with the Pittsburgh Pirates. He was released prior to the start of the season on February 22, 2025. Having experienced elbow soreness during spring training, Rodríguez missed the entirety of the season after undergoing Tommy John surgery.

=== New York Yankees ===
On November 23, 2025, Rodríguez signed a two-year minor league contract with the New York Yankees. In 17 games (4 starts) across 3 levels of the minors he threw 19.2 innings going 1-1 with a 6.41 ERA with 20 strikeouts.

== See also ==
- List of Major League Baseball players from the Dominican Republic
