= 2013 Los Angeles Angels season =

Major League Baseball season

2013 Los Angeles Angels
- League: American League
- Division: West
- Ballpark: Angel Stadium
- City: Anaheim, California
- Record: 78–84 (.481)
- Divisional place: 3rd
- Owner: Arte Moreno
- General manager: Jerry Dipoto
- Manager: Mike Scioscia
- Television: FSN West; KCOP (My 13) (Victor Rojas, Mark Gubicza, Amaury Pi-González, José Mota)
- Radio: KLAA (AM 830) KSPN (AM 710) (Terry Smith, José Mota, Mark Langston) Spanish: KWKW (AM 1330) (Rolando Nichols)
- Stats: ESPN.com; Baseball Reference

The 2013 Los Angeles Angels season was the franchise's 53rd season and 48th in Anaheim (all of them at Angel Stadium).

== Standings ==
=== Season standings ===
==== American League West ====
AL West
Team	W	L	Pct.	GB	Home	Road
Oakland Athletics	96	66	.593	—	52‍–‍29	44‍–‍37
Texas Rangers	91	72	.558	5½	46‍–‍36	45‍–‍36
Los Angeles Angels	78	84	.481	18	39‍–‍42	39‍–‍42
Seattle Mariners	71	91	.438	25	36‍–‍45	35‍–‍46
Houston Astros	51	111	.315	45	24‍–‍57	27‍–‍54

==== American League Wild Card ====
Division winners
Team	W	L	Pct.
Boston Red Sox	97	65	.599
Oakland Athletics	96	66	.593
Detroit Tigers	93	69	.574

Wild Card teams (Top 2 teams qualify for postseason)
Team	W	L	Pct.	GB
Cleveland Indians	92	70	.568	+½
Tampa Bay Rays	92	71	.564	—
Texas Rangers	91	72	.558	1
Kansas City Royals	86	76	.531	5½
New York Yankees	85	77	.525	6½
Baltimore Orioles	85	77	.525	6½
Los Angeles Angels	78	84	.481	13½
Toronto Blue Jays	74	88	.457	17½
Seattle Mariners	71	91	.438	20½
Minnesota Twins	66	96	.407	25½
Chicago White Sox	63	99	.389	28½
Houston Astros	51	111	.315	40½

=== Record vs. opponents ===
2013 American League record Source: MLB Standings Grid – 2013
Team	BAL	BOS	CWS	CLE	DET	HOU	KC	LAA	MIN	NYY	OAK	SEA	TB	TEX	TOR	NL
Baltimore	—	11–8	4–3	3–4	4–2	4–2	3–4	5–2	3–3	9–10	5–2	2–4	6–13	5–2	10–9	11–9
Boston	8–11	—	4–2	6–1	3–4	6–1	2–5	3–3	4–3	13–6	3–3	6–1	12–7	2–4	11–8	14–6
Chicago	3–4	2–4	—	2–17	7–12	3–4	9–10	3–4	8–11	3–3	2–5	3–3	2–5	4–2	4–3	8–12
Cleveland	4–3	1–6	17–2	—	4–15	6–1	10–9	4–2	13–6	1–6	5–2	5–2	2–4	5–1	4–2	11–9
Detroit	2–4	4–3	12–7	15–4	—	6–1	9–10	0–6	11–8	3–3	3–4	5–2	3–3	3–4	5–2	12–8
Houston	2–4	1–6	4–3	1–6	1–6	—	2–4	10–9	1–5	1–5	4–15	9–10	2–5	2–17	3–4	8–12
Kansas City	4–3	5–2	10–9	9–10	10–9	4–2	—	2–5	15–4	2–5	1–5	4–3	6–1	3–3	2–4	9–11
Los Angeles	2–5	3–3	4–3	2–4	6–0	9–10	5–2	—	1–5	3–4	8–11	11–8	4–3	4–15	6–1	10–10
Minnesota	3–3	3–4	11–8	6–13	8–11	5–1	4–15	5–1	—	2–5	1–6	4–3	1–6	4–3	1–5	8–12
New York	10–9	6–13	3–3	6–1	3–3	5–1	5–2	4–3	5–2	—	1–5	4–3	7–12	3–4	14–5	9–11
Oakland	2–5	3–3	5–2	2–5	4–3	15–4	5–1	11–8	6–1	5–1	—	8–11	3–3	10–9	4–3	13–7
Seattle	4–2	1–6	3–3	2–5	2–5	10–9	3–4	8–11	3–4	3–4	11–8	—	3–3	7–12	3–3	8–12
Tampa Bay	13–6	7–12	5–2	4–2	3–3	5–2	1–6	3–4	6–1	12–7	3–3	3–3	—	4–4	11–8	12–8
Texas	2–5	4–2	2–4	1–5	4–3	17–2	3–3	15–4	3–4	4–3	9–10	12–7	4–4	—	1–6	10–10
Toronto	9–10	8–11	3–4	2–4	2–5	4–3	4–2	1–6	5–1	5–14	3–4	3–3	8–11	6–1	—	11–9

=== Roster ===
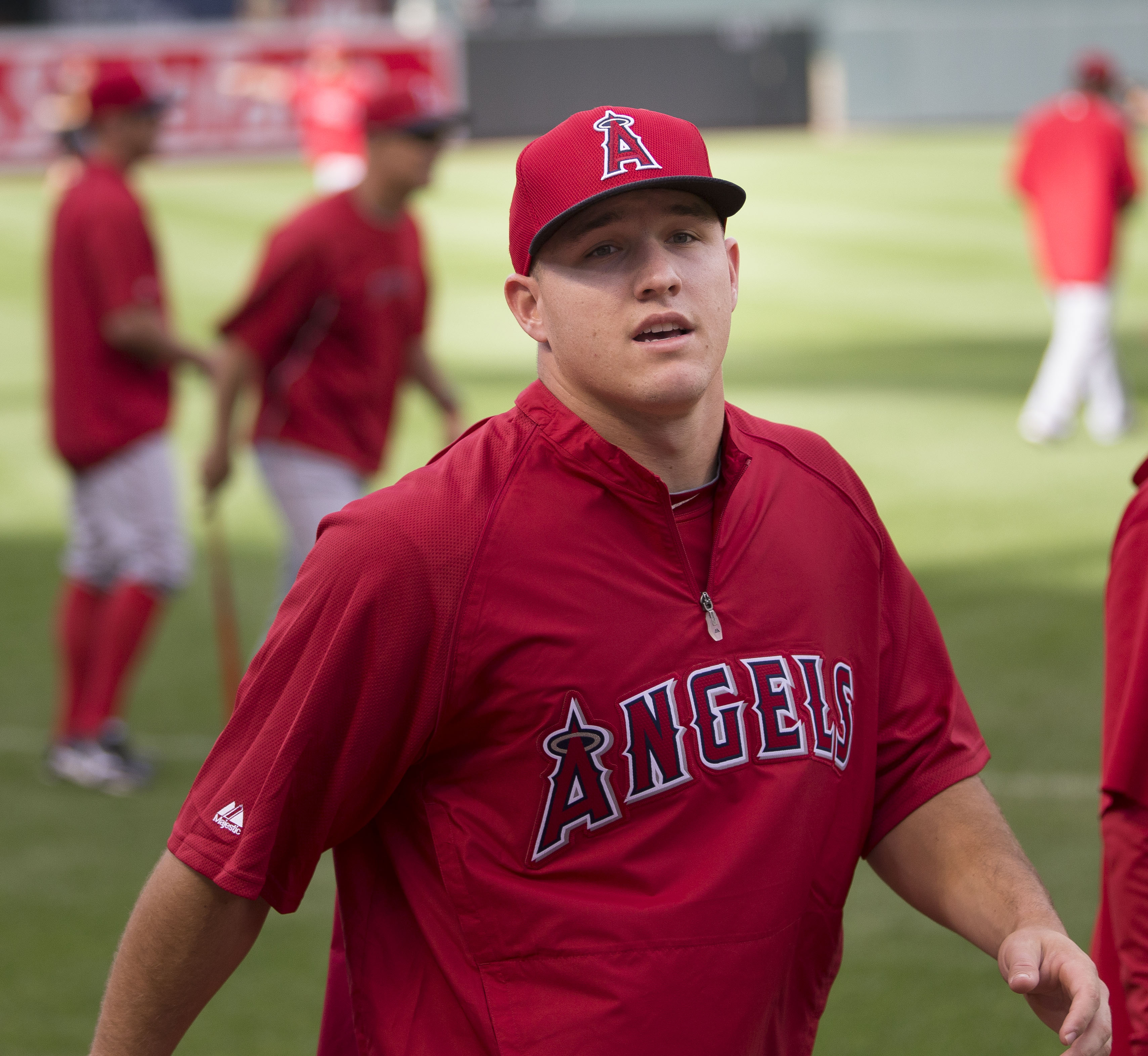
Mike Trout in 2013.

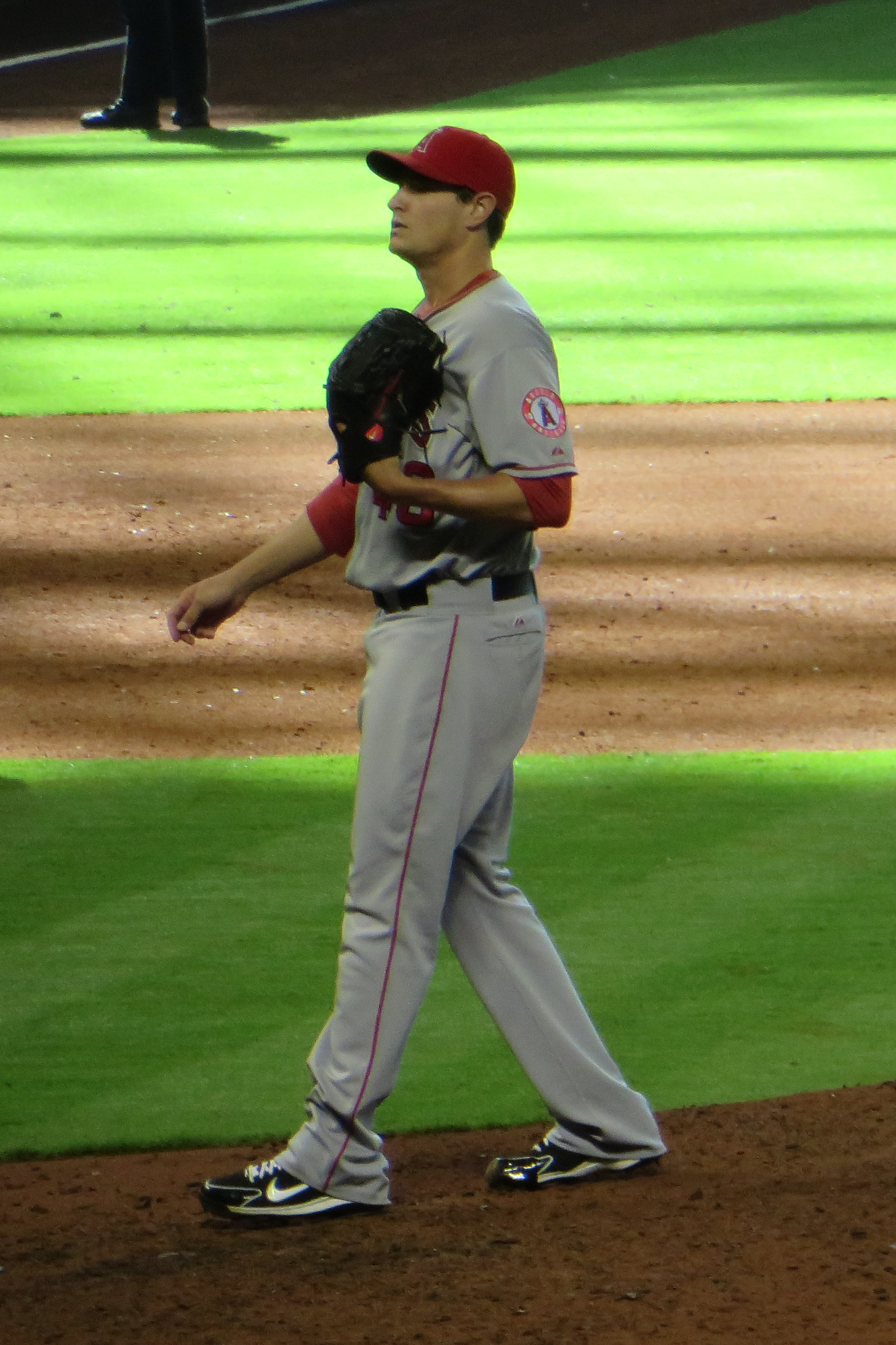
Garrett Richards in 2013.

2013 Los Angeles Angels
Roster
Pitchers: 55 Joe Blanton; 54 Buddy Boshers; 62 Ryan Brasier; 31 Billy Buckner; 24 Sean Burnett; 28 David Carpenter; 59 Robert Coello; 65 Dane De La Rosa; 37 Scott Downs; 45 Barry Enright; 49 Ernesto Frieri; 38 J. C. Gutiérrez; 48 Tommy Hanson; 40 Kevin Jepsen; 58 Michael Kohn; 38 Mark Lowe; 63 Nick Maronde; 46 Cory Rasmus; 43 Garrett Richards; 51 Michael Roth; 52 Matt Shoemaker; 41 Daniel Stange; 60 Jason Vargas; 36 Jered Weaver; 57 Jerome Williams; 33 C. J. Wilson	Catchers: 16 Hank Conger; 22 John Hester; 17 Chris Iannetta; Infielders: 2 Erick Aybar; 6 Alberto Callaspo; 12 Thomas Field; 10 Grant Green; 20 Brendan Harris; 10 Brad Hawpe; 18 Luis Jiménez; 47 Howie Kendrick; 68 Efren Navarro; 8 Chris Nelson; 5 Albert Pujols; 7 Andrew Romine; 44 Mark Trumbo	Outfielders: 25 Peter Bourjos; 56 Kole Calhoun; 3 Scott Cousins; 19 Collin Cowgill; 32 Josh Hamilton; 39 J. B. Shuck; 27 Mike Trout	Manager: 14 Mike Scioscia; Coaches: 23 Mike Butcher (pitching); 21 Dino Ebel (third base); 80 Jim Eppard (hitting); 70 Tom Gregorio (bullpen catcher); 4 Alfredo Griffin (first base); -- Bobby Knoop (infield); 53 Bill Lachemann (catching); 9 Rob Picciolo (bench); 61 Steve Soliz (bullpen)

== Player stats ==
=== Batting ===
Note: G = Games played; AB = At bats; R = Runs; H = Hits; 2B = Doubles; 3B = Triples; HR = Home runs; RBI = Runs batted in; SB = Stolen bases; BB = Walks; AVG = Batting average; SLG = Slugging average

Player	G	AB	R	H	2B	3B	HR	RBI	SB	BB	AVG	SLG
Mark Trumbo	159	620	85	145	30	2	34	100	5	54	.234	.453
Mike Trout	157	589	109	190	39	9	27	97	33	110	.323	.557
Josh Hamilton	151	576	73	144	32	5	21	79	4	47	.250	.432
Erick Aybar	138	550	68	149	33	5	6	54	12	23	.271	.382
Howie Kendrick	122	478	55	142	21	4	13	54	6	23	.297	.439
JB Shuck	129	437	60	128	20	3	2	39	8	27	.293	.366
Albert Pujols	99	391	49	101	19	0	17	64	1	40	.258	.437
Chris Iannetta	115	325	40	73	15	0	11	39	0	68	.225	.372
Alberto Callaspo	86	294	32	74	13	0	5	36	0	34	.252	.347
Hank Conger	92	233	23	58	13	1	7	21	0	17	.249	.403
Kole Calhoun	58	195	29	55	7	2	8	32	2	21	.282	..462
Peter Bourjos	55	175	26	48	3	3	3	12	6	10	.274	.377
Grant Green	40	125	16	35	8	1	1	16	0	10	.280	.384
Chris Nelson	33	109	10	24	1	2	3	18	2	8	.220	.349
Andrew Romine	47	108	9	28	3	0	0	10	1	7	.259	.287
Brendan Harris	44	107	14	22	4	0	4	9	0	6	.206	.355
Luis Jiménez	34	104	15	27	6	0	0	5	0	2	.260	.317
Collin Cowgill	50	91	11	21	3	2	2	8	1	5	.231	.374
Brad Hawpe	17	27	2	5	0	0	0	2	0	5	.185	.185
Tommy Field	15	26	4	4	0	0	0	0	0	1	.154	.154
Efrén Navarro	4	4	0	1	0	0	0	1	1	2	.250	.250
Scott Cousins	7	4	1	0	0	0	0	0	0	1	.000	.000
John Hester	1	0	1	0	0	0	0	0	0	1	.---	.---
Pitcher totals	162	20	1	2	0	0	0	0	0	1	.100	.100
Team totals	162	5588	733	1476	270	39	164	696	82	523	.264	.414

=== Pitching ===
Note: W = Wins; L = Losses; ERA = Earned run average; G = Games pitched; GS = Games started; SV = Saves; IP = Innings pitched; H = Hits allowed; R = Runs allowed; ER = Earned runs allowed; BB = Walks allowed; SO = Strikeouts

Player	W	L	ERA	G	GS	SV	IP	H	R	ER	BB	SO
C.J. Wilson	17	7	3.39	33	33	0	212.1	200	93	80	85	188
Jerome Williams	9	10	4.57	37	25	0	169.1	181	93	86	55	107
Jered Weaver	11	8	3.27	24	24	0	154.1	139	58	56	37	117
Jason Vargas	9	8	4.02	24	24	0	150.0	162	68	67	46	109
Garrett Richards	7	8	4.16	47	17	1	145.0	151	73	67	44	101
Joe Blanton	2	14	6.04	28	20	0	132.2	180	96	89	34	108
Tommy Hanson	4	3	5.42	15	13	0	73.0	83	47	44	30	56
Dane De La Rosa	6	1	2.86	75	0	2	72.1	56	25	23	28	65
Ernesto Frieri	2	4	3.80	67	0	37	68.2	55	29	29	30	98
Michael Kohn	1	4	3.74	63	0	0	53.0	42	22	22	28	52
Kevin Jepsen	1	3	4.50	45	0	0	36.0	41	21	18	14	36
Scott Downs	2	3	1.84	43	0	0	29.1	26	7	6	11	22
Juan Gutiérrez	1	4	5.19	28	0	0	26.0	26	16	15	12	28
Michael Roth	1	1	7.20	15	1	0	20.0	24	16	16	6	17
Billy Buckner	1	0	4.67	7	2	0	17.1	17	9	9	7	7
Robert Coello	2	2	3.71	16	0	1	17.0	14	7	7	8	23
Buddy Boshers	0	0	4.70	25	0	0	15.1	13	8	8	8	13
Cory Rasmus	1	1	4.20	16	0	0	15.0	16	9	7	10	14
Mark Lowe	1	0	9.26	11	0	0	11.2	11	12	12	11	7
Sean Burnett	0	0	0.93	13	0	0	9.2	9	1	1	4	7
Ryan Brasier	0	0	2.00	7	0	0	9.0	7	2	2	4	7
Barry Enright	0	2	12.96	4	2	0	8.1	12	12	12	7	6
Nick Maronde	0	0	6.75	10	0	0	5.1	4	6	4	8	5
Matt Shoemaker	0	0	0.00	1	1	0	5.0	2	0	0	2	5
Daniel Stange	0	1	16.20	3	0	0	1.2	2	3	3	2	1
David Carpenter	0	0	108.00	1	0	0	0.1	2	4	4	2	1
Team totals	78	84	4.23	162	162	41	1457.2	1475	737	685	533	1200

== Game log ==
Legend
Angels Win	Angels Loss	Game postponed

Game Log
April (9–17)

#	Date	Opponent	Score	Win	Loss	Save	Attendance	Record	Duration	Boxscore
1	April 1	@ Reds	3–1 (13)	Lowe (1–0)	Hoover (0–1)	Frieri (1)	43,168	1–0	4h 44m	W1
2	April 3	@ Reds	4–5	Chapman (1–0)	Downs (0–1)		35,257	1–1	3h 06m	L1
3	April 4	@ Reds	4–5	Arroyo (1–0)	Blanton (0–1)	Chapman (1)	23,795	1–2	2h 51m	L2
4	April 5	@ Rangers	2–3	Scheppers (1–0)	Downs (0–2)	Nathan (1)	48,845	1–3	2h 46m	L3
5	April 6	@ Rangers	8–4	Hanson (1–0)	Harrison (0–2)		47,201	2–3	3h 00m	W1
6	April 7	@ Rangers	3–7	Darvish (2–0)	Weaver (0–1)		42,034	2–4	3h 01m	L1
7	April 9	Athletics	5–9	Cook (1–0)	Jepsen (0–1)		44,014	2–5	3h 44m	L3
8	April 10	Athletics	5–11	Milone (2–0)	Blanton (0–2)		36,011	2–6	3h 47m	L4
9	April 11	Athletics	1–8	Griffin (2–0)	Vargas (0–1)		43,533	2–7	2h 59m	L5
10	April 12	Astros	0–5	Norris (2–1)	Hanson (1–1)		37,674	2–8	3h 23m	L6
11	April 13	Astros	4–5	Roth (1–0)	Veras (0–1)		43,520	3–8	3h 10m	W1
12	April 14	Astros	4–1	Wilson (1–0)	Humber (0–3)	Frieri (2)	36,126	4–8	3h 03m	W2
13	April 15	@ Twins	2–8	Correia (1–1)	Blanton (0–3)		23,535	4–9	2h 49m	L1
14	April 16	@ Twins	6–8	Pelfrey (2–1)	Vargas (0–2)	Perkins (3)	23,299	4–10	3h 30m	L2
–	April 17	@ Twins	Postponed (rain). Makeup date September 9th.							
15	April 19	Tigers	8–1	Hanson (2–1)	Sánchez (2–1)		39,023	5–10	3h 04m	W1
16	April 20	Tigers	10–0	Richards (1–0)	Porcello (0–2)		35,081	6–10	2h 52m	W2
17	April 21	Tigers	4–3 (13)	Williams (1–0)	Coke (0–2)		41,147	7–10	4h 28m	W3
18	April 22	Rangers	6–7	Scheppers (2–0)	Frieri (0–1)	Nathan (6)	36,192	7–11	3h 07m	L1
19	April 23	Rangers	5–4 (11)	De La Rosa (1–0)	Ortiz (2–1)		35,353	8–11	3h 13m	W1
20	April 24	Rangers	3–11	Darvish (4–1)	Roth (1–1)		37,154	8–12	3h 22m	L1
21	April 25	@ Mariners	0–6	Maurer (2–3)	Richards (1–1)		13,000	8–13	2h 29m	L2
22	April 26	@ Mariners	6–3	Wilson (2–0)	Harang (0–3)	Frieri (3)	31,543	9–13	3h 34m	W1
23	April 27	@ Mariners	2–3	Hernández (3–2)	Blanton (0–4)	Wilhelmsen (7)	31,901	9–14	2h 37m	L1
24	April 28	@ Mariners	1–2	Capps (2–1)	Vargas (0–3)	Wilhelmsen (8)	20,638	9–15	2h 31m	L2
25	April 29	@ Athletics	8–10 (19)	Blevins (2–0)	Enright (0–1)		11,668	9–16	6h 32m	L3
26	April 30	@ Athletics	6–10	Parker (1–4)	Richards (1–2)		14,764	9–17	3h 39m	L4

May (16–13)

#	Date	Opponent	Score	Win	Loss	Save	Attendance	Record	Duration	Boxscore
27	May 1	@ Athletics	5–4	Wilson (3–0)	Milone (3–3)	Frieri (4)	17,139	10–17	3h 35m	W1
28	May 2	Orioles	1–5	Tillman (2–1)	Blanton (0–5)		35,118	10–18	2h 28m	L1
29	May 3	Orioles	4–0	Vargas (1–3)	González (2–2)		40,140	11–18	2h 15m	W1
30	May 4	Orioles	4–5 (10)	Hunter (1–1)	Richards (1–3)	Johnson (11)	32,136	11–19	3h 43m	L1
31	May 5	Orioles	4–8	Hammel (5–1)	Williams (1–1)	O'Day (1)	38,047	11–20	3h 34m	L2
32	May 7	@ Astros	6–7	Lyles (1–0)	Wilson (3–1)	Veras (3)	15,266	11–21	2h 45m	L3
33	May 8	@ Astros	1–3	Norris (4–3)	Blanton (0–6)	Veras (4)	12,906	11–22	2h 30m	L4
34	May 9	@ Astros	6–5	Richards (2–3)	Ambriz (0–2)	Frieri (5)	13,003	12–22	4h 07m	W1
35	May 10	@ White Sox	7–5	Kohn (1–0)	Axelrod (0–3)	Frieri (6)	22,638	13–22	3h 35m	W2
36	May 11	@ White Sox	3–2	Williams (2–1)	Quintana (2–1)	Frieri (7)	28,774	14–22	2h 48m	W3
37	May 12	@ White Sox	0–3	Sale (4–2)	Wilson (3–2)		22,088	14–23	2h 32m	L1
38	May 13	Royals	4–11	Mendoza (1–2)	Blanton (0–7)	Hochevar (1)	32,203	14–24	3h 07m	L2
39	May 14	Royals	6–2	Vargas (2–3)	Guthrie (5–1)		33,028	15–24	2h 32m	W1
40	May 15	Royals	5–9	Davis (3–3)	Enright (0–2)		31,917	15–25	3h 36m	L1
41	May 16	White Sox	4–5	Lindstrom (2–2)	De La Rosa (1–1)	Reed (13)	37,711	15–26	3h 08m	L2
42	May 17	White Sox	0–3	Sale (5–2)	Wilson (3–3)	Reed (14)	37,546	15–27	2h 48m	L3
43	May 18	White Sox	12–9	Coello (1–0)	Jones (0–4)	Frieri (8)	37,165	16–27	3h 50m	W1
44	May 19	White Sox	6–2	Vargas (3–3)	Peavy (5–2)	Frieri (9)	38,190	17–27	3h 04m	W2
45	May 21	Mariners	12–0	Williams (3–1)	Harang (1–5)		34,095	18–27	2h 47m	W3
46	May 22	Mariners	7–1	Wilson (4–3)	Maurer (2–6)		33,313	19–27	2h 44m	W4
47	May 23	@ Royals	5–4	Blanton (1–7)	Santana (3–4)	Coello (1)	18,784	20–27	2h 55m	W5
48	May 24	@ Royals	5–2	Vargas (4–3)	Hochevar (0–1)	Richards (1)	32,148	21–27	3h 01m	W6
49	May 25	@ Royals	7–0	Buckner (1–0)	Guthrie (5–3)		27,958	22–27	2h 44m	W7
50	May 26	@ Royals	5–2	Williams (4–1)	Davis (3–4)	Frieri (10)	24,475	23–27	3h 38m	W8
51	May 27	@ Dodgers	7–8	Belisario (3–4)	Coello (1–1)	League (11)	49,953	23–28	3h 37m	L1
52	May 28	@ Dodgers	0–3	Ryu (6–2)	Blanton (1–8)		46,433	23–29	2h 11m	L2
53	May 29	Dodgers	4–3	Weaver (1–1)	Capuano (1–4)	Frieri (11)	39,172	24–29	2h 50m	W1
54	May 30	Dodgers	3–2	Vargas (5–3)	Lilly (0–2)	Frieri (12)	42,231	25–29	2h 45m	W2
55	May 31	Astros	3–6	Keuchel (2–2)	Hanson (2–2)	Veras (9)	34,401	25–30	3h 10m	L1

June (14–13)

#	Date	Opponent	Score	Win	Loss	Save	Attendance	Record	Duration	Boxscore
56	June 1	Astros	0–2	Norris (5–4)	Williams (4–2)	Veras (10)	40,087	25–31	3h 14m	L2
57	June 2	Astros	4–5	Lyles (3–1)	Wilson (4–4)	Ambriz (2)	35,515	25–32	3h 19m	L3
58	June 3	Astros	1–2	Bédard (1–2)	Blanton (1–9)	Veras (11)	30,010	25–33	2h 38m	L4
59	June 4	Cubs	4–3	Coello (2–1)	Villanueva (1–4)	Frieri (13)	32,223	26–33	3h 01m	W1
60	June 5	Cubs	6–8 (10)	Gregg (2–0)	Coello (2–2)		30,171	26–34	4h 14m	L1
–	June 7	@ Red Sox	Postponed (rain). Makeup Date June 8.							
61	June 8	@ Red Sox	9–5	Hanson (3–2)	Doubront (4–3)	Frieri (14)	34,499	27–34	4h 00m	W1
62	June 8	@ Red Sox	2–7	Buchholz (9–0)	Wilson (4–5)		36,518	27–35	3h 25m	L1
63	June 9	@ Red Sox	5–10	Dempster (4–6)	Blanton (1–10)		37,054	27–36	3h 33m	L2
64	June 10	@ Orioles	3–4	García (3–3)	Weaver (1–2)	Johnson (22)	15,514	27–37	2h 23m	L3
65	June 11	@ Orioles	2–3	González (4–2)	Vargas (5–4)	Johnson (23)	22,834	27–38	2h 42m	L4
66	June 12	@ Orioles	9–5	Williams (5–2)	Strop (0–3)		25,964	28–38	3h 13m	W1
67	June 14	Yankees	5–2	Wilson (5–5)	Pettitte (5–4)	Frieri (15)	40,621	29–38	2h 53m	W2
68	June 15	Yankees	6–2	Hanson (4–2)	Phelps (4–4)		40,486	30–38	3h 10m	W3
69	June 16	Yankees	5–6	Sabathia (7–5)	Weaver (1–3)	Rivera (24)	41,204	30–39	2h 58m	L1
70	June 17	Mariners	11–3	Vargas (6–4)	Harang (3–7)		30,258	31–39	2h 56m	W1
71	June 18	Mariners	2–3 (10)	Furbush (1–3)	Richards (2–4)	Medina (1)	33,040	31–40	3h 42m	L1
72	June 19	Mariners	1–0	Wilson (6–5)	Saunders (5–7)	Frieri (16)	35,401	32–40	2h 27m	W1
73	June 20	Mariners	10–9	Downs (1–2)	Capps (2–2)	Frieri (17)	37,711	33–40	3h 36m	W2
74	June 21	Pirates	2–5	Cole (3–0)	Weaver (1–4)	Grilli (26)	40,136	33–41	2h 55m	L1
75	June 22	Pirates	1–6	Liriano (6–3)	Williams (5–3)		41,114	33–42	2h 52m	L2
76	June 23	Pirates	9–10 (10)	Melancon (2–1)	Jepsen (0–2)		35,069	33–43	3h 55m	L3
77	June 25	@ Tigers	14–8	Wilson (7–5)	Porcello (4–5)		34,402	34–43	4h 03m	W1
78	June 26	@ Tigers	7–4	De La Rosa (2–1)	Álvarez (1–1)	Frieri (18)	35,635	35–43	3h 06m	W2
79	June 27	@ Tigers	3–1 (10)	Jepsen (1–2)	Coke (0–5)	Frieri (19)	39,496	36–43	3h 25m	W3
80	June 28	@ Astros	4–2	De La Rosa (3–1)	Clemens (4–3)	Frieri (20)	20,498	37–43	3h 49m	W4
81	June 29	@ Astros	7–2	Blanton (2–10)	Lyles (4–3)		26,650	38–43	3h 01m	W5
82	June 30	@ Astros	3–1	Wilson (8–5)	Cisnero (2–1)	Frieri (21)	22,361	39–43	3h 08m	W6

July (9–14)

#	Date	Opponent	Score	Win	Loss	Save	Attendance	Record	Duration	Boxscore
83	July 2	Cardinals	5–1	Weaver (2–4)	Lynn (10–3)		39,455	40–43	2h 40m	W7
84	July 3	Cardinals	2–12	Miller (9–6)	Williams (5–4)		35,025	40–44	3h 22m	L1
85	July 4	Cardinals	6–5	Downs (2–2)	Mujica (0–1)		42,707	41–44	2h 51m	W1
86	July 5	Red Sox	2–6	Doubront (5–3)	Wilson (8–6)		37,092	41–45	3h 14m	L1
87	July 6	Red Sox	9–7 (11)	De La Rosa (4–1)	Breslow (2–2)		36,112	42–45	4h 22m	W1
88	July 7	Red Sox	3–0	Weaver (3–4)	Lackey (6–6)	Frieri (22)	39,018	43–45	2h 57m	W2
89	July 9	@ Cubs	2–7	Wood (6–6)	Blanton (2–11)		31,579	43–46	2h 43m	L1
90	July 10	@ Cubs	13–2	Wilson (9–6)	Samardzija (5–9)		31,111	44–46	3h 04m	W1
91	July 12	@ Mariners	3–8	Saunders (8–8)	Williams (5–5)		21,372	44–47	2h 45m	L1
92	July 13	@ Mariners	0–6	Hernández (10–4)	Weaver (3–5)		32,458	44–48	2h 57m	L2
93	July 14	@ Mariners	3–4	Iwakuma (8–4)	Blanton (2–12)	Wilhelmsen (19)	25,629	44–49	2h 51m	L3
All-Star Break: AL defeats NL 3–0
94	July 19	Athletics	4–1	Weaver (4–5)	Griffin (8–7)	Frieri (23)	43,515	45–49	2h 58m	W1
95	July 20	Athletics	2–0	Wilson (10–6)	Straily (6–3)	Frieri (24)	43,572	46–49	2h 31m	W2
96	July 21	Athletics	0–6	Colón (13–3)	Williams (5–6)		37,441	46–50	2h 48m	L1
97	July 22	Twins	3–4	Deduno (6–4)	Blanton (2–13)	Perkins (24)	33,363	46–51	3h 31m	L2
98	July 23	Twins	3–10 (10)	Perkins (2–0)	Frieri (0–2)		39,177	46–52	3h 38m	L3
99	July 24	Twins	1–0	Weaver (5–5)	Pelfrey (4–8)	Frieri (25)	38,209	47–52	2h 43m	W1
100	July 25	@ Athletics	8–3	Wilson (11–6)	Straily (6–4)		20,468	48–52	3h 13m	W2
101	July 26	@ Athletics	4–6	Colón (14–3)	Williams (5–7)	Balfour (27)	27,429	48–53	3h 12m	L1
102	July 27	@ Athletics	1–3	Milone (9–8)	Downs (2–3)	Balfour (28)	32,333	48–54	3h 03m	L2
103	July 28	@ Athletics	6–10	Chavez (2–2)	Gutierrez (0–2)		25,877	48–55	3h 31m	L3
104	July 29	@ Rangers	3–4	Frasor (1–2)	Frieri (0–3)		36,282	48–56	3h 04m	L4
105	July 30	@ Rangers	11–14 (10)	Nathan (2–1)	Stange (0–1)		36,931	48–57	4h 46m	L5
106	July 31	@ Rangers	1–2	Nathan (3–1)	Kohn (1–1)		39,391	48–58	2h 30m	L6

August (14–14)

#	Date	Opponent	Score	Win	Loss	Save	Attendance	Record	Duration	Boxscore
107	August 1	Blue Jays	8–2	Richards (3–4)	Johnson (1–8)		37,179	49–58	2h 38m	W1
108	August 2	Blue Jays	7–5	De La Rosa (5–1)	Delabar (5–2)	Frieri (26)	38,884	50–58	3h 15m	W2
109	August 3	Blue Jays	7–3	Weaver (6–5)	Rogers (3–6)		41,253	51–58	2h 35m	W3
110	August 4	Blue Jays	5–6	Cecil (5–1)	Frieri (0–4)	Janssen (19)	33,936	51–59	3h 05m	L1
111	August 5	Rangers	2–5	Pérez (4–3)	Williams (5–8)	Nathan (33)	34,040	51–60	3h 01m	L2
112	August 6	Rangers	3–8	Darvish (11–5)	Jepsen (1–3)	Scheppers (1)	34,233	51–61	3h 12m	L3
113	August 7	Rangers	3–10	Ogando (5–3)	Hanson (4–3)		34,777	51–62	3h 51m	L4
114	August 9	@ Indians	5–2	Weaver (7–5)	Kazmir (7–5)	De La Rosa (1)	28,729	52–62	2h 50m	W1
115	August 10	@ Indians	7–2	Wilson (12–6)	Jiménez (8–7)		32,733	53–62	3h 41m	W2
116	August 11	@ Indians	5–6	Albers (3–1)	Gutiérrez (0–3)	Perez (18)	23,433	53–63	3h 13m	L1
117	August 12	@ Yankees	1–2	Kuroda (11–7)	Richards (3–5)	Robertson (1)	37,146	53–64	2h 42m	L2
118	August 13	@ Yankees	7–14	Sabathia (10–10)	Vargas (6–5)		35,013	53–65	3h 33m	L3
119	August 14	@ Yankees	3–11	Nova (6–4)	Weaver (7–6)		38,379	53–66	2h 40m	L4
120	August 15	@ Yankees	8–4	Wilson (13–6)	Hughes (4–12)		44,682	54–66	3h 49m	W1
121	August 16	Astros	2–8	Peacock (2–4)	Williams (5–9)		39,074	54–67	3h 48m	L1
122	August 17	Astros	6–5 (10)	Frieri (1–14)	Fields (1–3)		40,246	55–67	3h 48m	W1
123	August 18	Astros	5–7	Oberholtzer (3–1)	Gutiérrez (0–4)	Chapman (1)	36,896	55–68	3h 22m	L1
124	August 19	Indians	2–5	McAllister (6–7)	Weaver (7–7)		36,574	55–69	3h 03m	L2
125	August 20	Indians	1–4 (14)	Carrasco (1–4)	Blanton (2–14)		36,421	55–70	5h 17m	L3
126	August 21	Indians	1–3	Masterson (14–9)	Williams (5–10)	Perez (20)	35,810	55–71	2h 59m	L4
127	August 23	@ Mariners	2–0	Richards (4–5)	Hernández (12–7)	Frieri (27)	21,616	56–71	2h 45m	W1
128	August 24	@ Mariners	5–1	Vargas (7–5)	Ramírez (4–1)		24,477	57–71	3h 18m	W2
129	August 25	@ Mariners	7–1	Weaver (8–7)	Harang (5–11)		23,001	58–71	2h 50m	W3
130	August 27	@ Rays	6–5	Frieri (2–4)	Rodney (5–4)	De La Rosa (2)	12,939	59–71	3h 36m	W4
131	August 28	@ Rays	1–4	Archer (8–5)	Richards (4–6)	Rodney (31)	13,535	59–72	2h 47m	L1
132	August 29	@ Rays	2–0	Vargas (8–5)	Odorizzi (0–1)	Frieri (28)	15,741	60–72	3h 02m	W1
133	August 30	@ Brewers	5–0	Weaver (9–7)	Peralta (8–14)		32,340	61–72	3h 16m	W2
134	August 31	@ Brewers	6–5	De La Rosa (6–1)	Henderson (3–4)	Frieri (29)	28,175	62–72	3h 19m	W3

September (16–12)

#	Date	Opponent	Score	Win	Loss	Save	Attendance	Record	Duration	Boxscore
135	September 1	@ Brewers	5–3	Wilson (14–6)	Wooten (3–1)	Frieri (30)	29,733	63–72	3h 06m	W4
136	September 2	Rays	11–2	Richards (5–6)	Archer (8–6)		37,557	64–72	3h 58m	W5
137	September 3	Rays	1–7	Moore (15–3)	Vargas (8–6)	Hernández (1)	34,332	64–73	3h 07m	L1
138	September 4	Rays	1–3	Hellickson (11–8)	Weaver (9–8)	Rodney (32)	34,025	64–74	2h 54m	L2
139	September 5	Rays	6–2	Williams (6–10)	Price (8–7)		34,623	65–74	2h 49m	W1
140	September 6	Rangers	6–5	Wilson (15–6)	Garza (9–4)	Frieri (31)	39,591	66–74	2h 51m	W2
141	September 7	Rangers	8–3	Richards (6–6)	Holland (9–8)		40,558	67–74	3h 10m	W3
142	September 8	Rangers	3–4	Ogando (6–4)	Kohn (1–2)	Nathan (39)	35,423	67–75	3h 31m	L1
143	September 9	@ Twins	3–6	Fien (4–2)	Rasmus (0–1)	Perkins (33)	21,826	67–76	3h 19m	L2
144	September 10	@ Blue Jays	12–6	Williams (7–10)	Buehrle (11–8)		19,079	68–76	2h 43m	W1
145	September 11	@ Blue Jays	5–4	Wilson (16–6)	Delabar (5–3)	Frieri (32)	17,994	69–76	2h 43m	W2
146	September 12	@ Blue Jays	4–3	Richards (7–6)	Happ (4–6)	Frieri (33)	20,767	70–76	3h 10m	W3
147	September 13	@ Astros	7–9	Keuchel (6–9)	Vargas (8–7)	Fields (5)	19,742	70–77	3h 10m	L1
148	September 14	@ Astros	6–2	Weaver (10–8)	Oberholtzer (4–3)		21,905	71–77	3h 11m	W1
149	September 15	@ Astros	2–1	Williams (8–10)	Clemens (4–5)	Frieri (34)	21,374	72–77	2h 57m	W2
150	September 16	@ Athletics	12–1	Wilson (17–6)	Parker (11–7)		14,629	73–77	3h 09m	W3
151	September 17	@ Athletics	1–2	Balfour (1–3)	Kohn (1–3)		18,771	73–78	3h 26m	L1
152	September 18	@ Athletics	5–4 (11)	Gutiérrez (1–4)	Chavez (2–4)	Frieri (35)	74–78	20,260	3h 19m	W1
153	September 20	Mariners	3–2 (11)	Rasmus (1–1)	LaFromboise (0–1)		39,469	75–78	4h 10m	W2
154	September 21	Mariners	6–5	Williams (9–10)	Saunders (11–16)	Frieri (36)	41,001	76–78	3h 01m	W3
155	September 22	Mariners	2–3	Pérez (3–3)	Wilson (17–7)	Farquhar (15)	39,099	76–79	3h 22m	L1
156	September 23	Athletics	5–10	Milone (12–9)	Richards (7–7)		41,147	76–80	3h 07m	L2
157	September 24	Athletics	3–0	Vargas (9–7)	Griffin (14–10)		38,158	77–80	2h 17m	W1
158	September 25	Athletics	3–1	Weaver (11–8)	Straily (10–8)	Frieri (37)	36,226	78–80	2h 31m	W2
159	September 26	@ Rangers	5–6	Nathan (6–2)	Kohn (1–4)		26,198	78–81	3h 22m	L1
160	September 27	@ Rangers	3–5	Cotts (7–3)	Gutiérrez (1–5)	Nathan (42)	37,355	78–82	3h 31m	L2
161	September 28	@ Rangers	4–7	Soria (1–0)	Richards (7–8)	Nathan (43)	38,635	78–83	3h 18m	L3
162	September 29	@ Rangers	2–6	Cotts (8–3)	Vargas (9–8)		40,057	78–84	2h 57m	L4

=== Quick notes ===
- On April 29, with 19 innings of play; the duration of the game was 6 hours and 32 minutes long. This duration was the longest game time for both clubs, the Angels and the Oakland Athletics.

== Farm system ==
Level	Team	League	Manager
AAA	Salt Lake Bees	Pacific Coast League	Keith Johnson
AA	Arkansas Travelers	Texas League	Tim Bogar
A	Inland Empire 66ers	California League	Bill Haselman
A	Burlington Bees	Midwest League	Jamie Burke
Rookie	AZL Angels	Arizona League	Denny Hocking
Rookie	Orem Owlz	Pioneer League	Bill Richardson

LEAGUE CHAMPIONS: Inland Empire

== See also ==
- Los Angeles Angels
- Angel Stadium

Records
Preceded by 2012	Los Angeles Angels seasons 2013	Succeeded by 2014
