= 2013 Oakland Athletics season =

2013 Oakland Athletics
- American League West champions
- League: American League
- Division: West
- Ballpark: O.co Coliseum
- City: Oakland, California
- Record: 96–66 (.593)
- Divisional place: 1st
- Owners: Lewis Wolff, John Fisher
- General managers: Billy Beane
- Managers: Bob Melvin
- Television: Comcast SportsNet California (Glen Kuiper, Ray Fosse, Scott Hatteberg)
- Radio: KGMZ (Ken Korach, Vince Cotroneo, Ray Fosse, Amaury Pi-González, Manolo Hernández-Douen)

The 2013 Oakland Athletics season was the 46th for the franchise in Oakland, as well as the 113th in club history. Oakland was defending their division title in the new five-team American League West during the 2013 season. On September 22, 2013, they clinched their second straight American League West championship. For the second consecutive year, they lost to the Detroit Tigers in five games in the ALDS, this time after leading the series 2–1.

== Offseason ==
Following a successful 2012 season in which the team won the AL West, GM Billy Beane stated he would keep the team mostly intact, and "if moves are made, they will be additions". The first acquisition occurred October 19 in a three-team trade involving Arizona and Miami; Oakland sent Cliff Pennington to Arizona and minor leaguer Yordy Cabrera to Miami, and the team received Chris Young from Arizona. In November, the team traded pitcher Tyson Ross and minor leaguer A. J. Kirby-Jones to San Diego for infielder Andy Parrino and pitcher Andrew Werner. Grant Green, Arnold Leon, Shane Peterson, and Michael Ynoa were added to the 40-man roster and Andrew Carignan, Brandon Hicks (who was traded to the Mets) and Jim Miller (who was claimed off waivers by the Yankees and later designated for assignment) were removed. The next move was to trade Collin Cowgill to the Mets for Jefry Marté. When free agent Stephen Drew signed with the Boston Red Sox, Oakland signed Japanese shortstop Hiroyuki Nakajima to a 2-year, $6.5 million deal, with an option for a third year, in order to fill the vacancy. Pitcher Graham Godfrey was sent to Boston as a player to be named later to complete a previous trade, while Brandon McCarthy and Jonny Gomes, who both elected free agency, signed with Arizona and Boston, respectively. In January, Oakland was involved in their second three-team trade of the offseason, trading pitching prospect A. J. Cole back to Washington (he was part of a trade for Gio González the year before) and receiving catcher John Jaso from Seattle. Upon the acquisition of Jaso, George Kottaras was designated for assignment. In February, the A's were involved in a five-player deal with new division rival Houston, trading Chris Carter, Brad Peacock and Max Stassi in exchange for shortstop Jed Lowrie and reliever Fernando Rodriguez.

In addition to player movement, there was also a coaching change made by the Athletics. Bullpen coach Rick Rodriguez was offered a position within the organization, and Darren Bush, the manager of the Triple-A affiliate Sacramento River Cats, will assume bullpen coaching responsibilities.

== Regular season ==
=== American League West ===
AL West
Team	W	L	Pct.	GB	Home	Road
Oakland Athletics	96	66	.593	—	52‍–‍29	44‍–‍37
Texas Rangers	91	72	.558	5½	46‍–‍36	45‍–‍36
Los Angeles Angels	78	84	.481	18	39‍–‍42	39‍–‍42
Seattle Mariners	71	91	.438	25	36‍–‍45	35‍–‍46
Houston Astros	51	111	.315	45	24‍–‍57	27‍–‍54

=== American League Wild Card ===
Division winners
Team	W	L	Pct.
Boston Red Sox	97	65	.599
Oakland Athletics	96	66	.593
Detroit Tigers	93	69	.574

Wild Card teams (Top 2 teams qualify for postseason)
Team	W	L	Pct.	GB
Cleveland Indians	92	70	.568	+½
Tampa Bay Rays	92	71	.564	—
Texas Rangers	91	72	.558	1
Kansas City Royals	86	76	.531	5½
New York Yankees	85	77	.525	6½
Baltimore Orioles	85	77	.525	6½
Los Angeles Angels	78	84	.481	13½
Toronto Blue Jays	74	88	.457	17½
Seattle Mariners	71	91	.438	20½
Minnesota Twins	66	96	.407	25½
Chicago White Sox	63	99	.389	28½
Houston Astros	51	111	.315	40½

=== Game log ===
Legend
Athletics Win	Athletics Loss	Game postponed
**Bold**	Oakland Athletics Pitcher	

2013 Game Log: 96–66 (Home: 52–29; Road: 44–37)
April: 16–12 (Home: 9–7; Road: 7–5)

#	Date	Opponent	Score	Win	Loss	Save	Attendance	Record
1	April 1	Mariners	0–2	Hernández (1–0)	**Anderson** (0–1)	Wilhelmsen (1)	36,067	0–1
2	April 2	Mariners	1–7	Iwakuma (1–0)	**Parker** (0–1)		15,315	0–2
3	April 3	Mariners	6–2	**Milone** (1–0)	Saunders (0–1)		15,162	1–2
4	April 4	Mariners	8–2	**Griffin** (1–0)	Maurer (0–1)		12,134	2–2
5	April 5	@ Astros	8–3	**Straily** (1–0)	Peacock (0–1)		18,197	3–2
6	April 6	@ Astros	6–3	**Colón** (1–0)	Norris (1–1)	**Balfour** (1)	18,685	4–2
7	April 7	@ Astros	9–3	**Anderson** (1–1)	Harrell (0–2)		16,914	5–2
8	April 9	@ Angels	9–5	**Cook** (1–0)	Jepsen (0–1)		44,014	6–2
9	April 10	@ Angels	11–5	**Milone** (2–0)	Blanton (0–2)		36,011	7–2
10	April 11	@ Angels	8–1	**Griffin** (2–0)	Vargas (0–1)		43,533	8–2
11	April 12	Tigers	4–3 (12)	**Resop** (1–0)	Villarreal (0–2)		21,377	9–2
12	April 13	Tigers	3–7	Verlander (2–1)	**Anderson** (1–2)		35,067	9–3
13	April 14	Tigers	1–10	Sánchez (2–0)	**Parker** (0–2)		20,755	9–4
14	April 15	Astros	11–2	**Milone** (3–0)	Bédard (0–1)		10,689	10–4
15	April 16	Astros	4–3	**Doolittle** (1–0)	Cruz (0–1)	**Balfour** (2)	11,038	11–4
16	April 17	Astros	7–5	**Colón** (2–0)	Norris (2–2)	**Balfour** (3)	15,488	12–4
17	April 19	@ Rays	3–8	Cobb (2–1)	**Anderson** (1–3)		15,115	12–5
18	April 20	@ Rays	0–1	Hellickson (1–1)	**Parker** (0–3)	Rodney (2)	25,611	12–6
19	April 21	@ Rays	1–8	Hernández (1–3)	**Milone** (3–1)		25,954	12–7
20	April 22	@ Red Sox	6–9	Doubront (2–0)	**Griffin** (2–1)	Bailey (4)	28,926	12–8
21	April 23	@ Red Sox	13–0 (7)	**Colón** (3–0)	Aceves (1–1)		29,006	13–8
22	April 24	@ Red Sox	5–6	Lester (4–0)	**Anderson** (1–4)	Bailey (5)	29,274	13–9
23	April 25	Orioles	2–10	Hammel (3–1)	**Parker** (0–4)		11,220	13–10
24	April 26	Orioles	0–3	Chen (2–2)	**Milone** (3–2)	Johnson (9)	16,944	13–11
25	April 27	Orioles	3–7	Tillman (1–1)	**Griffin** (2–2)	Johnson (10)	31,292	13–12
26	April 28	Orioles	9–8 (10)	**Blevins** (1–0)	Strop (0–1)		27,475	14–12
27	April 29	Angels	10–8 (19)	**Blevins** (2–0)	Enright (0–1)		11,668	15–12
28	April 30	Angels	10–6	**Parker** (1–4)	Richards (1–2)		14,764	16–12

May: 16–12 (Home: 7–3; Road: 9–9)

#	Date	Opponent	Score	Win	Loss	Save	Attendance	Record
29	May 1	Angels	4–5	Wilson (3–0)	**Milone** (3–3)	Frieri (4)	17,139	16–13
30	May 3	@ Yankees	2–0	**Griffin** (3–2)	Sabathia (4–3)	**Balfour** (4)	38,090	17–13
31	May 4	@ Yankees	2–4	Hughes (1–2)	**Colón** (3–1)		41,349	17–14
32	May 5	@ Yankees	5–4	**Doolittle** (2–0)	Logan (2–2)	**Balfour** (5)	38,134	18–14
33	May 6	@ Indians	3–7	Jiménez (2–2)	**Parker** (1–5)		9,514	18–15
34	May 7	@ Indians	0–1	McAllister (3–3)	**Milone** (3–4)	Perez (4)	9,474	18–16
35	May 8	@ Indians	3–4	Masterson (5–2)	**Griffin** (3–3)	Perez (5)	11,125	18–17
36	May 9	@ Indians	2–9	Kazmir (2–1)	**Colón** (3–2)		12,477	18–18
37	May 10	@ Mariners	3–6	Iwakuma (4–1)	**Straily** (1–1)	Wilhelmsen (10)	25,509	18–19
38	May 11	@ Mariners	4–3	**Parker** (2–5)	Maurer (2–5)	**Balfour** (6)	30,089	19–19
39	May 12	@ Mariners	1–6	Saunders (3–4)	**Milone** (3–5)		27,599	19–20
40	May 13	Rangers	5–1	**Griffin** (4–3)	Grimm (2–3)		11,030	20–20
41	May 14	Rangers	5–6	Scheppers (3–0)	**Resop** (1–1)	Nathan (12)	12,969	20–21
42	May 15	Rangers	2–6	Ogando (4–2)	**Straily** (1–2)		20,414	20–22
43	May 17	Royals	2–1	**Doolittle** (3–0)	Shields (2–4)	**Balfour** (7)	14,602	21–22
44	May 18	Royals	2–1	**Milone** (4–5)	Santana (3–3)	**Balfour** (8)	35,067	22–22
45	May 19	Royals	4–3	**Blevins** (3–0)	Herrera (2–4)	**Cook** (1)	20,387	23–22
46	May 20	@ Rangers	9–2	**Colón** (4–2)	Lindblom (0–1)		31,865	24–22
47	May 21	@ Rangers	1–0	**Straily** (2–2)	Darvish (7–2)	**Balfour** (9)	42,510	25–22
48	May 22	@ Rangers	1–3	Wolf (1–0)	**Parker** (2–6)	Nathan (14)	42,731	25–23
49	May 24	@ Astros	6–5	**Neshek** (1–0)	Veras (0–3)	**Balfour** (10)	15,907	26–23
50	May 25	@ Astros	11–5	**Griffin** (5–3)	Harrell (3–6)		18,591	27–23
51	May 26	@ Astros	6–2	**Colón** (5–2)	Keuchel (1–2)		19,366	28–23
52	May 27	Giants	4–1	**Straily** (3–2)	Bumgarner (4–3)	**Balfour** (11)	36,067	29–23
53	May 28	Giants	6–3	**Parker** (3–6)	Kickham (0–1)		35,067	30–23
54	May 29	@ Giants	9–6	**Milone** (5–5)	Lincecum (3–5)	**Balfour** (12)	41,512	31–23
55	May 30	@ Giants	2–5	Zito (4–3)	**Griffin** (5–4)	Romo (14)	41,250	31–24
56	May 31	White Sox	3–0	**Colón** (6–2)	Axelrod (3–4)		16,416	32–24

June: 16–11 (Home: 10–3; Road: 6–8)

#	Date	Opponent	Score	Win	Loss	Save	Attendance	Record
57	June 1	White Sox	4–3 (10)	**Blevins** (4–0)	Santiago (1–4)		26,646	33–24
58	June 2	White Sox	2–0	**Parker** (4–6)	Sale (5–3)	**Balfour** (13)	23,413	34–24
59	June 3	@ Brewers	10–2	**Milone** (6–5)	Estrada (4–4)		21,023	35–24
60	June 4	@ Brewers	3–4 (10)	Axford (2–3)	**Neshek** (1–1)		24,230	35–25
61	June 5	@ Brewers	6–1	**Colón** (7–2)	Gallardo (4–6)		25,912	36–25
62	June 6	@ White Sox	5–4 (10)	**Blevins** (5–0)	Thornton (0–2)	**Balfour** (14)	21,156	37–25
63	June 7	@ White Sox	4–3	**Parker** (5–6)	Sale (5–4)	**Balfour** (15)	22,861	38–25
64	June 8	@ White Sox	1–4	Danks (1–2)	**Doolittle** (3–1)	Reed (18)	23,735	38–26
65	June 9	@ White Sox	2–4	Santiago (2–4)	**Griffin** (5–5)	Reed (19)	31,033	38–27
66	June 11	Yankees	6–4	**Colón** (8–2)	Sabathia (6–5)	**Balfour** (16)	27,118	39–27
67	June 12	Yankees	5–2	**Straily** (4–2)	Hughes (3–5)	**Balfour** (17)	25,176	40–27
68	June 13	Yankees	3–2 (18)	**Chavez** (1–0)	Claiborne (0–1)		27,569	41–27
69	June 14	Mariners	2–3	Saunders (5–6)	**Milone** (6–6)	Pérez (1)	31,448	41–28
70	June 15	Mariners	0–4	Hernández (8–4)	**Griffin** (5–6)		24,378	41–29
71	June 16	Mariners	10–2	**Colón** (9–2)	Iwakuma (7–2)		36,067	42–29
72	June 17	@ Rangers	7–8	Cotts (3–1)	**Chavez** (1–1)	Nathan (21)	30,489	42–30
73	June 18	@ Rangers	6–2	**Parker** (6–6)	Darvish (7–3)		37,769	43–30
74	June 19	@ Rangers	4–9	Grimm (6–5)	**Milone** (6–7)		39,274	43–31
75	June 20	@ Rangers	3–4	Scheppers (5–0)	**Doolittle** (3–2)	Nathan (22)	30,361	43–32
76	June 21	@ Mariners	6–3	**Colón** (10–2)	Iwakuma (7–2)	**Balfour** (18)	23,086	44–32
77	June 22	@ Mariners	5–7	Medina (2–2)	**Cook** (1–1)		20,704	44–33
78	June 23	@ Mariners	3–6	Pérez (2–1)	**Balfour** (0–1)		22,813	44–34
79	June 25	Reds	7–3	**Neshek** (2–1)	Arroyo (6–6)		17,506	45–34
80	June 26	Reds	5–0	**Griffin** (6–6)	Bailey (4–6)		25,658	46–34
81	June 28	Cardinals	6–1	**Colón** (11–2)	Miller (8–6)		24,208	47–34
82	June 29	Cardinals	1–7	Wainwright (11–5)	**Chavez** (1–2)		35,067	47–35
83	June 30	Cardinals	7–5	**Milone** (7–7)	Westbrooke (4–3)	**Balfour** (19)	20,673	48–35

July: 15–10 (Home: 12–1; Road: 9–3)

#	Date	Opponent	Score	Win	Loss	Save	Attendance	Record
84	July 2	Cubs	8–7	**Otero** (1–0)	Russell (1–2)	**Balfour** (20)	17,273	49–35
85	July 3	Cubs	1–3	Garza (4–1)	**Colón** (11–3)	Gregg (14)	35,067	49–36
86	July 4	Cubs	1–0	**Straily** (5–2)	Guerrier (2–4)	**Balfour** (21)	26,967	50–36
87	July 5	@ Royals	6–3	**Milone** (8–7)	Davis (4–7)	**Balfour** (22)	35,518	51–36
88	July 6	@ Royals	3–4	Crow (6–3)	**Cook** (1–2)	Holland (20)	16,606	51–37
89	July 7	@ Royals	10–4	**Griffin** (7–6)	Mendoza (2–5)	**Chavez** (1)	17,804	52–37
90	July 8	@ Pirates	2–1	**Colón** (12–3)	Locke (8–2)	**Balfour** (23)	23,743	53–37
91	July 9	@ Pirates	2–1	**Straily** (6–2)	Cole (4–2)	**Balfour** (24)	24,560	54–37
92	July 10	@ Pirates	0–5	Liriano (9–3)	**Milone** (8–8)		23,474	54–38
93	July 12	Red Sox	2–4	Lackey (7–6)	**Doolittle** (3–3)	Uehara (8)	27,084	54–39
94	July 13	Red Sox	3–0	**Griffin** (8–6)	Lester (8–6)	**Balfour** (25)	36,067	55–39
95	July 14	Red Sox	3–2 (11)	**Cook** (2–2)	Thornton (0–4)		31,417	56–39
96	July 19	@ Angels	1–4	Weaver (4–5)	**Griffin** (8–7)	Frieri (23)	43,415	56–40
97	July 20	@ Angels	0–2	Wilson (10–6)	**Straily** (6–3)	Frieri (24)	43,572	56–41
98	July 21	@ Angels	6–0	**Colón** (13–3)	Williams (5–6)		37,441	57–41
99	July 22	@ Astros	4–3	**Cook** (3–2)	Wright (0–4)	**Balfour** (26)	16,381	58–41
100	July 23	@ Astros	4–5	Fields (1–1)	**Balfour** (0–2)		32,249	58–42
101	July 24	@ Astros	4–3	**Griffin** (9–7)	Blackley (1–1)	**Cook** (2)	24,831	59–42
102	July 25	Angels	3–8	Wilson (11–6)	**Straily** (6–4)		20,468	59–43
103	July 26	Angels	6–4	**Colón** (14–3)	Williams (5–7)	**Balfour** (27)	27,429	60–43
104	July 27	Angels	3–1	**Milone** (9–8)	Downs (2–3)	**Balfour** (28)	32,333	61–43
105	July 28	Angels	10–6	**Chavez** (2–2)	Gutierrez (0–2)		25,877	62–43
106	July 29	Blue Jays	9–4	**Griffin** (10–7)	Rogers (3–5)		13,309	63–43
107	July 30	Blue Jays	0–5	Buehrle (7–7)	**Straily** (6–5)		17,479	63–44
108	July 31	Blue Jays	2–5 (10)	Janssen (4–0)	**Chavez** (2–3)	Cecil (1)	23,638	63–45

August: 19–8 (Home: 10–4; Road: 9–4)

#	Date	Opponent	Score	Win	Loss	Save	Attendance	Record
109	August 2	Rangers	3–8	Frasor (2–2)	**Milone** (9–9)		35,067	63–46
110	August 3	Rangers	4–2	**Parker** (7–6)	Garza (1–1)	**Balfour** (29)		64–46
111	August 4	Rangers	0–4	Holland (9–6)	**Griffin** (10–8)		23,263	64–47
112	August 6	@ Reds	1–3	Latos (11–3)	**Straily** (6–6)	Chapman (26)	34,640	64–48
113	August 7	@ Reds	5–6	Bailey (7–10)	**Colón** (14–4)	Chapman (27)	29,746	64–49
114	August 9	@ Blue Jays	14–6	**Parker** (8–6)	Rogers (3–7)		31,862	65–49
115	August 10	@ Blue Jays	4–5	Buehrle (8–7)	**Gray** (0–1)	Janssen (21)	39,634	65–50
116	August 11	@ Blue Jays	6–4	**Cook** (4–2)	Oliver (3–3)	**Balfour** (30)	45,312	66–50
117	August 12	@ Blue Jays	5–1	**Cook** (5–2)	Janssen (4–1)		36,111	67–50
118	August 13	Astros	4–5	Lyles (5–6)	**Colón** (14–5)	Lo (1)	14,261	67–51
119	August 14	Astros	1–2 (11)	Harrell (6–13)	**Doolittle** (3–4)	Fields (2)	18,278	67–52
120	August 15	Astros	5–0	**Gray** (1–1)	Bédard (3–9)		16,487	68–52
121	August 16	Indians	3–2	**Doolittle** (4–4)	Masterson (13–9)	**Balfour** (31)	17,491	69–52
122	August 17	Indians	7–11	Jiménez (9–7)	**Straily** (6–7)		35,067	69–53
123	August 18	Indians	7–3	**Otero** (2–0)	Kazmir (7–6)		21,114	70–53
124	August 19	Mariners	2–1	**Parker** (9–6)	Capps (2–3)		11,112	71–53
125	August 20	Mariners	4–7	Maurer (4–7)	**Doolittle** (4–5)	Farquhar (8)	13,041	71–54
126	August 21	Mariners	3–5	Iwakuma (12–6)	**Griffin** (10–9)	Farquhar (9)	18,641	71–55
127	August 23	@ Orioles	7–9	Rodríguez (3–1)	**Cook** (5–3)	Johnson (40)	36,761	71–56
128	August 24	@ Orioles	2–1	**Parker** (10–6)	O'Day (5–3)	**Balfour** (32)	33,834	72–56
129	August 25	@ Orioles	3–10	Feldman (11–9)	**Gray** (1–2)		33,820	72–57
130	August 26	@ Tigers	8–6	**Griffin** (11–9)	Alvarez (1–4)	**Balfour** (33)	34,778	73–57
131	August 27	@ Tigers	6–3 (6)	**Milone** (10–9)	Verlander (12–10)		34,356	74–57
132	August 28	@ Tigers	14–4	**Straily** (7–7)	Fister (11–7)	**Anderson** (1)	31,973	75–57
133	August 29	@ Tigers	6–7	Benoit (4–0)	**Balfour** (0–3)		39,212	75–58
134	August 30	Rays	4–3	**Cook** (6–3)	Price (8–6)	**Balfour** (34)	15,603	76–58
135	August 31	Rays	2–1	**Gray** (2–2)	Cobb (2–2)	**Balfour** (35)	35,067	77–58

September: 19–8 (Home: 11–4; Road: 8–4)

#	Date	Opponent	Score	Win	Loss	Save	Attendance	Record
136	September 1	Rays	5–1	**Griffin** (12–9)	Torres (4–1)		18,639	78–58
137	September 2	Rangers	4–2	**Straily** (8–7)	Holland (9–7)	**Balfour** (36)	23,495	79–58
138	September 3	Rangers	1–5	Perez (9–3)	**Colón** (14–6)		16,133	79–59
139	September 4	Rangers	11–4	**Parker** (11–6)	Darvish (12–7)	**Anderson** (2)	18,886	80–59
140	September 5	Astros	2–3	Peacock (4–5)	**Gray** (2–3)		11,569	80–60
141	September 6	Astros	7–5	**Griffin** (13–9)	Keuchel (5–9)	**Balfour** (37)	15,502	81–60
142	September 7	Astros	2–1	**Straily** (9–7)	Oberholtzer (4–2)	**Doolittle** (1)	20,340	82–60
143	September 8	Astros	7–2	**Colón** (15–6)	Harrell (6–16)	**Anderson** (3)	18,824	83–60
144	September 10	@ Twins	3–4	Swarzak (2–2)	**Cook** (6–4)	Perkins (34)	26,017	83–61
145	September 11	@ Twins	18–3	**Gray** (3–3)	Pelfrey (5–12)		24,522	84–61
146	September 12	@ Twins	8–2	**Griffin** (14–9)	Diamond (5–11)		26,188	85–61
147	September 13	@ Rangers	9–8	**Straily** (10–7)	Holland (9–9)	**Doolittle** (2)	40,180	86–61
148	September 14	@ Rangers	1–0	**Colón** (16–6)	Darvish (12–9)	**Balfour** (38)	36,067	87–61
149	September 15	@ Rangers	5–1	**Milone** (11–9)	Perez (9–5)		42,980	88–61
150	September 16	Angels	1–12	Wilson (17–6)	**Parker** (11–7)		14,629	88–62
151	September 17	Angels	2–1	**Balfour** (1–3)	Kohn (1–3)		18,771	89–62
152	September 18	Angels	4–5 (11)	Gutierrez (1–4)	**Chavez** (2–4)	Frieri (35)	20,260	89–63
153	September 19	Twins	8–6	**Doolittle** (5–5)	Martis (0–1)		11,461	90–63
154	September 20	Twins	11–0	**Colón** (17–6)	Albers (2–4)		36,067	91–63
155	September 21	Twins	9–1	**Parker** (12–7)	Hernández (3–2)		26,393	92–63
156	September 22	Twins	11–7	**Gray** (4–3)	De Vries (0–1)		30,589	93–63
157	September 23	@ Angels	10–5	**Milone** (12–9)	Richards (7–7)		41,147	94–63
158	September 24	@ Angels	0–3	Vargas (9–7)	**Griffin** (14–10)		38,158	94–64
159	September 25	@ Angels	1–3	Weaver (11–8)	**Straily** (10–8)	Frieri (37)	36,226	94–65
160	September 27	@ Mariners	8–2	**Colón** (18–6)	Hernández (12–10)		23,041	95–65
161	September 28	@ Mariners	5–7	Maurer (5–8)	**Parker** (12–8)	Farquhar (16)	17,751	95–66
162	September 29	@ Mariners	9–0	**Gray** (5–3)	Ramirez (5–3)		17,081	96–66

==== Record against opponents ====
Final season record

2013 American League record Source: MLB Standings Grid – 2013
Team	BAL	BOS	CWS	CLE	DET	HOU	KC	LAA	MIN	NYY	OAK	SEA	TB	TEX	TOR	NL
Baltimore	—	11–8	4–3	3–4	4–2	4–2	3–4	5–2	3–3	9–10	5–2	2–4	6–13	5–2	10–9	11–9
Boston	8–11	—	4–2	6–1	3–4	6–1	2–5	3–3	4–3	13–6	3–3	6–1	12–7	2–4	11–8	14–6
Chicago	3–4	2–4	—	2–17	7–12	3–4	9–10	3–4	8–11	3–3	2–5	3–3	2–5	4–2	4–3	8–12
Cleveland	4–3	1–6	17–2	—	4–15	6–1	10–9	4–2	13–6	1–6	5–2	5–2	2–4	5–1	4–2	11–9
Detroit	2–4	4–3	12–7	15–4	—	6–1	9–10	0–6	11–8	3–3	3–4	5–2	3–3	3–4	5–2	12–8
Houston	2–4	1–6	4–3	1–6	1–6	—	2–4	10–9	1–5	1–5	4–15	9–10	2–5	2–17	3–4	8–12
Kansas City	4–3	5–2	10–9	9–10	10–9	4–2	—	2–5	15–4	2–5	1–5	4–3	6–1	3–3	2–4	9–11
Los Angeles	2–5	3–3	4–3	2–4	6–0	9–10	5–2	—	1–5	3–4	8–11	11–8	4–3	4–15	6–1	10–10
Minnesota	3–3	3–4	11–8	6–13	8–11	5–1	4–15	5–1	—	2–5	1–6	4–3	1–6	4–3	1–5	8–12
New York	10–9	6–13	3–3	6–1	3–3	5–1	5–2	4–3	5–2	—	1–5	4–3	7–12	3–4	14–5	9–11
Oakland	2–5	3–3	5–2	2–5	4–3	15–4	5–1	11–8	6–1	5–1	—	8–11	3–3	10–9	4–3	13–7
Seattle	4–2	1–6	3–3	2–5	2–5	10–9	3–4	8–11	3–4	3–4	11–8	—	3–3	7–12	3–3	8–12
Tampa Bay	13–6	7–12	5–2	4–2	3–3	5–2	1–6	3–4	6–1	12–7	3–3	3–3	—	4–4	11–8	12–8
Texas	2–5	4–2	2–4	1–5	4–3	17–2	3–3	15–4	3–4	4–3	9–10	12–7	4–4	—	1–6	10–10
Toronto	9–10	8–11	3–4	2–4	2–5	4–3	4–2	1–6	5–1	5–14	3–4	3–3	8–11	6–1	—	11–9

== Roster ==
2013 Oakland Athletics
Roster
Pitchers: 49 Brett Anderson; 50 Grant Balfour; 13 Jerry Blevins; 60 Jesse Chavez; 40 Bartolo Colón; 48 Ryan Cook; 62 Sean Doolittle; 65 Pedro Figueroa; 54 Sonny Gray; 64 A. J. Griffin; 57 Tommy Milone; 47 Pat Neshek; 39 Hideki Okajima; 61 Dan Otero; 11 Jarrod Parker; 44 Chris Resop; 58 Evan Scribner; 67 Dan Straily	Catchers: 5 John Jaso; 36 Derek Norris; 22 Kurt Suzuki; 21 Stephen Vogt; Infielders: 10 Daric Barton; 18 Alberto Callaspo; 20 Josh Donaldson; 7 Nate Freiman; 35 Grant Green; 8 Jed Lowrie; 22 Luke Montz; 37 Brandon Moss; 12 Andy Parrino; 32 Shane Peterson; 17 Adam Rosales; 29 Scott Sizemore; 28 Eric Sogard; 19 Jemile Weeks	Outfielders: 52 Yoenis Céspedes; 35 Michael Choice; 4 Coco Crisp; 16 Josh Reddick; 15 Seth Smith; 23 Michael Taylor; 53 Casper Wells; 25 Chris Young	Manager: 6 Bob Melvin; Coaches: 51 Darren Bush (bullpen); 30 Chili Davis (hitting); 2 Mike Gallego (third base); 14 Chip Hale (bench); 59 Ariel Prieto (coach); 46 Tye Waller (first base); 41 Curt Young (pitching)

== Player stats ==
=== Batting ===
Note: G = Games played; AB = At bats; R = Runs; H = Hits; 2B = Doubles; 3B = Triples; HR = Home runs; RBI = Runs batted in; SB = Stolen bases; BB = Walks; AVG = Batting average; SLG = Slugging percentage

Player	G	AB	R	H	2B	3B	HR	RBI	SB	BB	AVG	SLG
Jed Lowrie	154	603	80	175	45	2	15	75	1	50	.290	.446
Josh Donaldson	158	579	89	174	37	3	24	93	5	76	.301	.499
Yoenis Céspedes	135	529	74	127	21	4	26	80	7	37	.240	.442
Coco Crisp	131	513	93	134	22	3	22	66	21	61	.261	.444
Brandon Moss	145	446	73	114	23	3	30	87	4	50	.256	.522
Josh Reddick	114	385	54	87	19	2	12	56	9	46	.226	.379
Eric Sogard	130	368	45	98	24	3	2	35	10	27	.266	.364
Seth Smith	117	368	49	93	27	0	8	40	0	39	.253	.391
Chris Young	107	335	46	67	18	3	12	40	10	36	.200	.379
Derek Norris	98	264	41	65	16	0	9	30	5	37	.246	.409
John Jaso	70	207	31	56	12	0	3	21	2	38	.271	.372
Nate Freiman	80	190	10	52	8	1	4	24	0	14	.274	.389
Alberto Callaspo	50	159	20	43	7	0	5	22	0	19	.270	.409
Adam Rosales	51	136	11	26	5	0	4	8	0	10	.191	.316
Stephen Vogt	47	135	18	34	6	1	4	16	0	9	.252	.400
Daric Barton	37	104	15	28	2	0	3	16	0	13	.269	.375
Andy Parrino	14	34	2	4	2	0	0	1	0	2	.118	.176
Kurt Suzuki	15	33	6	10	2	0	2	7	0	2	.303	.545
Luke Montz	13	28	2	5	3	0	1	5	0	1	.179	.393
Michael Taylor	9	23	0	1	0	0	0	0	0	2	.043	.043
Michael Choice	9	18	2	5	1	0	0	0	0	1	.278	.333
Grant Green	5	15	0	0	0	0	0	1	0	0	.000	.000
Jemile Weeks	8	9	3	1	0	0	0	0	0	0	.111	.111
Shane Peterson	2	7	1	1	0	0	0	1	0	1	.143	.143
Scott Sizemore	2	6	0	1	1	0	0	0	0	0	.167	.333
Casper Wells	3	5	0	0	0	0	0	0	0	0	.000	.000
Pitcher totals	162	22	2	2	0	0	0	1	0	2	.091	.091
Team totals	162	5521	767	1403	301	25	186	725	74	573	.254	.419

=== Pitching ===
Note: W = Wins; L = Losses; ERA = Earned run average; G = Games pitched; GS = Games started; SV = Saves; IP = Innings pitched; H = Hits allowed; R = Runs allowed; ER = Earned runs allowed; BB = Walks allowed; SO = Strikeouts

Player	W	L	ERA	G	GS	SV	IP	H	R	ER	BB	SO
A.J. Griffin	14	10	3.83	32	32	0	200.0	171	91	85	54	171
Jarrod Parker	12	8	3.97	32	32	0	197.0	178	92	87	63	134
Bartolo Colón	18	6	2.65	30	30	0	190.1	193	60	56	29	117
Tommy Milone	12	9	4.14	28	26	0	156.1	160	83	72	39	126
Dan Straily	10	8	3.96	27	27	0	152.1	132	74	67	57	124
Sean Doolittle	5	5	3.13	70	0	2	69.0	53	24	24	13	60
Ryan Cook	6	4	2.54	71	0	2	67.1	62	22	19	25	67
Sonny Gray	5	3	2.67	12	10	0	64.0	51	22	19	20	67
Grant Balfour	1	3	2.59	65	0	38	62.2	48	20	18	27	72
Jerry Blevins	5	0	3.15	67	0	0	60.0	47	23	21	17	52
Jesse Chavez	2	4	3.92	35	0	1	57.1	50	27	25	20	55
Brett Anderson	1	4	6.04	16	5	3	44.2	51	32	30	21	46
Pat Neshek	2	1	3.35	45	0	0	40.1	40	17	15	15	29
Dan Otero	2	0	1.38	33	0	0	39.0	42	7	6	6	27
Evan Scribner	0	0	4.39	18	0	0	26.2	26	13	13	7	19
Chris Resop	1	1	6.00	18	0	0	18.0	22	13	12	10	13
Hideki Okajima	0	0	2.25	5	0	0	4.0	7	1	1	2	1
Pedro Figueroa	0	0	12.00	5	0	0	3.0	6	4	4	3	3
Team totals	96	66	3.56	162	162	46	1452.0	1339	625	574	428	1183

== Postseason ==
=== American League Division Series ===
==== Game 1, October 4 ====
9:37 p.m. (EDT) at O.co Coliseum in Oakland, California

Team	1	2	3	4	5	6	7	8	9	R	H	E
Detroit	3	0	0	0	0	0	0	0	0	3	10	0
Oakland	0	0	0	0	0	0	2	0	0	2	3	1
WP: Max Scherzer (1–0) LP: Bartolo Colón (0–1) Sv: Joaquín Benoit (1); Home runs: DET: None; OAK: Yoenis Céspedes (1)

==== Game 2, October 5 ====
9:07 p.m. (EDT) at O.co Coliseum in Oakland, California

Team	1	2	3	4	5	6	7	8	9	R	H	E
Detroit	0	0	0	0	0	0	0	0	0	0	4	0
Oakland	0	0	0	0	0	0	0	0	1	1	8	0
WP: Grant Balfour (1–0) LP: Al Alburquerque (0–1)

==== Game 3, October 7 ====
1:07 p.m. (EDT) at Comerica Park in Detroit, Michigan

Team	1	2	3	4	5	6	7	8	9	R	H	E
Oakland	0	0	1	2	3	0	0	0	0	6	10	0
Detroit	0	0	0	3	0	0	0	0	0	3	7	1
WP: Jarrod Parker (1–0) LP: Aníbal Sánchez (0–1) Sv: Grant Balfour (1); Home runs: OAK: Josh Reddick (1), Brandon Moss (1), Seth Smith (1); DET: None

==== Game 4, October 8 ====
5:07 p.m. (EDT) at Comerica Park in Detroit, Michigan

Team	1	2	3	4	5	6	7	8	9	R	H	E
Oakland	1	0	0	0	2	0	1	0	2	6	12	0
Detroit	0	0	0	0	3	0	2	3	X	8	9	0
WP: Max Scherzer (2–0) LP: Sean Doolittle (0–1); Home runs: OAK: Jed Lowrie (1); DET: Jhonny Peralta (1), Víctor Martínez (1)

==== Game 5, October 10 ====
8:07 p.m. (EDT) at O.co Coliseum in Oakland, California

Team	1	2	3	4	5	6	7	8	9	R	H	E
Detroit	0	0	0	2	0	1	0	0	0	3	8	0
Oakland	0	0	0	0	0	0	0	0	0	0	3	0
WP: Justin Verlander (1–0) LP: Sonny Gray (0–1) Sv: Joaquín Benoit (2); Home runs: DET: Miguel Cabrera (1); OAK: None

== Farm system ==
Level	Team	League	Manager
AAA	Sacramento River Cats	Pacific Coast League	Steve Scarsone
AA	Midland RockHounds	Texas League	Aaron Nieckula
A	Stockton Ports	California League	Webster Garrison
A	Beloit Snappers	Midwest League	Ryan Christenson
A-Short Season	Vermont Lake Monsters	New York–Penn League	Rick Magnante
Rookie	AZL Athletics	Arizona League	Marcus Jensen
