= Robert Coello =

American baseball player (born 1984)

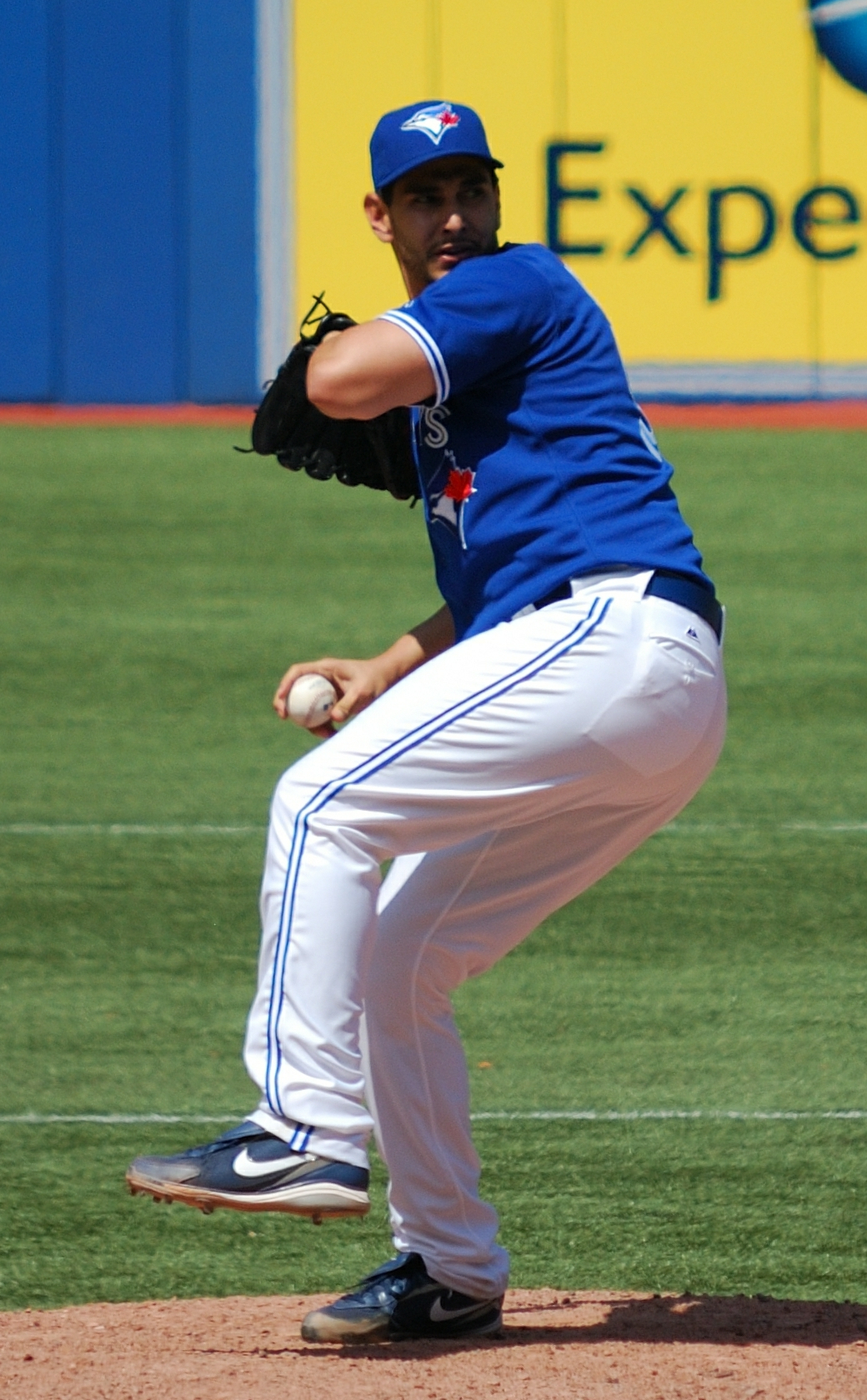
- Coello with the Toronto Blue Jays
- Pitcher
- Born: November 23, 1984 (age 41); Bayonne, New Jersey, U.S.
- Batted: Right Threw: Right

Professional debut
- MLB: September 6, 2010, for the Boston Red Sox
- KBO: April 2, 2016, for the Nexen Heroes

Last appearance
- MLB: September 28, 2013, for the Los Angeles Angels of Anaheim
- KBO: June 12, 2016, for the Nexen Heroes

MLB statistics
- Win–loss record: 2–3
- Earned run average: 5.90
- Strikeouts: 39

KBO statistics
- Win–loss record: 6–5
- Earned run average: 3.77
- Strikeouts: 46
- Stats at Baseball Reference

Teams
- Boston Red Sox (2010); Toronto Blue Jays (2012); Los Angeles Angels of Anaheim (2013); Nexen Heroes (2016)

Robert Coello (/koʊˈɛjoʊ/; born November 23, 1984) is an American former professional baseball pitcher. He played in Major League Baseball (MLB) for the Boston Red Sox, Toronto Blue Jays, and Los Angeles Angels of Anaheim, and in the KBO League for the Nexen Heroes.

== Professional career ==
Coello attended Lake Region High School in Eagle Lake, Florida and Northwest Florida State College. He was drafted by the Cincinnati Reds in the 20th round of the 2004 Major League Baseball draft. Coello then played for the Los Angeles Angels of Anaheim's Arizona League team in 2007.

=== Boston Red Sox ===
After playing for Edmonton of the independent Golden Baseball League in 2008, Coello signed with the Boston Red Sox organization for the 2009 season. Coello made his major league debut September 2010 with Boston and had a 4.76 ERA in six relief outings. He was designated for assignment by the Red Sox on February 9, 2011, following the acquisition of Alfredo Aceves. In three minor league seasonsx Coello posted a record of 13–10 with a 2.91 ERA.

=== Chicago Cubs ===
On February 15, 2011, the Red Sox traded Coello to the Chicago Cubs for minor league second baseman Tony Thomas. The Cubs designated him for assignment on May 27, 2011. Coello made 34 appearances (15 starts) split between the Double-A Tennessee Smokies and Triple-A Iowa Cubs, accumulating a 7-8 record and 4.19 ERA with 110 strikeouts and one save over 116 innings pitched.

=== Toronto Blue Jays ===
On December 9, 2011, Coello signed a minor league contract with the Toronto Blue Jays. He spent most of 2012 pitching for the Blue Jays' Triple-A affiliate, going 4–1 with a 3.00 ERA in 19 games (three starts). He was placed on the 40-man roster on May 31, 2012. He made six appearances for the Blue Jays in 2012, giving up 12 earned runs in 12 innings. On October 9, the Blue Jays reinstated Coello from the 60-day disabled list, and outrighted him off their 40-man roster. According to the Jays transaction page, Coello refused the assignment and elected free agency.

=== Los Angeles Angels of Anaheim ===
On January 28, 2013, Coello was signed to a minor league contract by the Los Angeles Angels of Anaheim, a contract which included an invitation to big league spring training. On May 11, the Angels selected Coello's contract, adding him to their active roster. In 16 appearances for Los Angeles, he logged a 2-2 record and 3.71 ERA with 23 strikeouts and one save over 17 innings of work. On October 8, Coello was removed from the 40-man roster and sent outright to the Triple-A Salt Lake Bees. Coello elected free agency two days later.

=== New York Yankees ===
On January 8, 2014, Coello signed a minor league contract with the New York Yankees organization. In 26 appearances for the Triple-A Scranton/Wilkes-Barre RailRiders, he recorded a 2-1 record and 1.69 ERA with 49 strikeouts across 64 1/3 innings pitched. Coello opted out of his contract on July 2.

=== Baltimore Orioles ===
On July 11, 2014, Coello signed a minor league contract with the Baltimore Orioles organization. In 20 appearances for the Triple-A Norfolk Tides, Coello compiled a 4-1 record and 1.90 ERA with 25 strikeouts and two saves across 23 2/3 innings pitched.

=== San Francisco Giants ===
Coello signed a minor league deal with the San Francisco Giants with an opt out clause by June 1. On June 1, 2015, Coello exercised his opt-out clause and became a free agent. Prior to his release, Coello had been pitching as a starter for the Triple-A Sacramento River Cats, logging a 6-3 record and 3.50 ERA with 49 strikeouts over 11 starts.

=== Texas Rangers ===
On August 5, 2015, Coello signed a minor league contract with the Texas Rangers organization. He made six appearances (five starts) for the Triple-A Round Rock Express, registering a 1-3 record and 5.64 ERA with 13 strikeouts across 30 1/3 innings pitched.

=== Nexen Heroes ===
On December 3, 2015, Coello signed a one-year $550,000 contract with the Nexen Heroes of the KBO League. He made 12 starts for Nexen in 2016, posting a 6-5 record and 3.77 ERA with 46 strikeouts over 62 innings of work. Coello was waived on June 16, 2016, when the team signed Scott McGregor.

== Minor Leagues ==
In his six-year Minor League career, Coello has compiled a 3.33 ERA in 171 games (31 starts), posting a rate of 9.9 strikeouts per nine innings, 3.9 walks per nine innings and a 1.23 WHIP.

== Repertoire ==
Coello developed a forkball to go along with his fastball and changeup. He has nicknamed his forkball "The WTF" because of its unusual movement.
