= Dane De La Rosa =

American baseball player (born 1983)

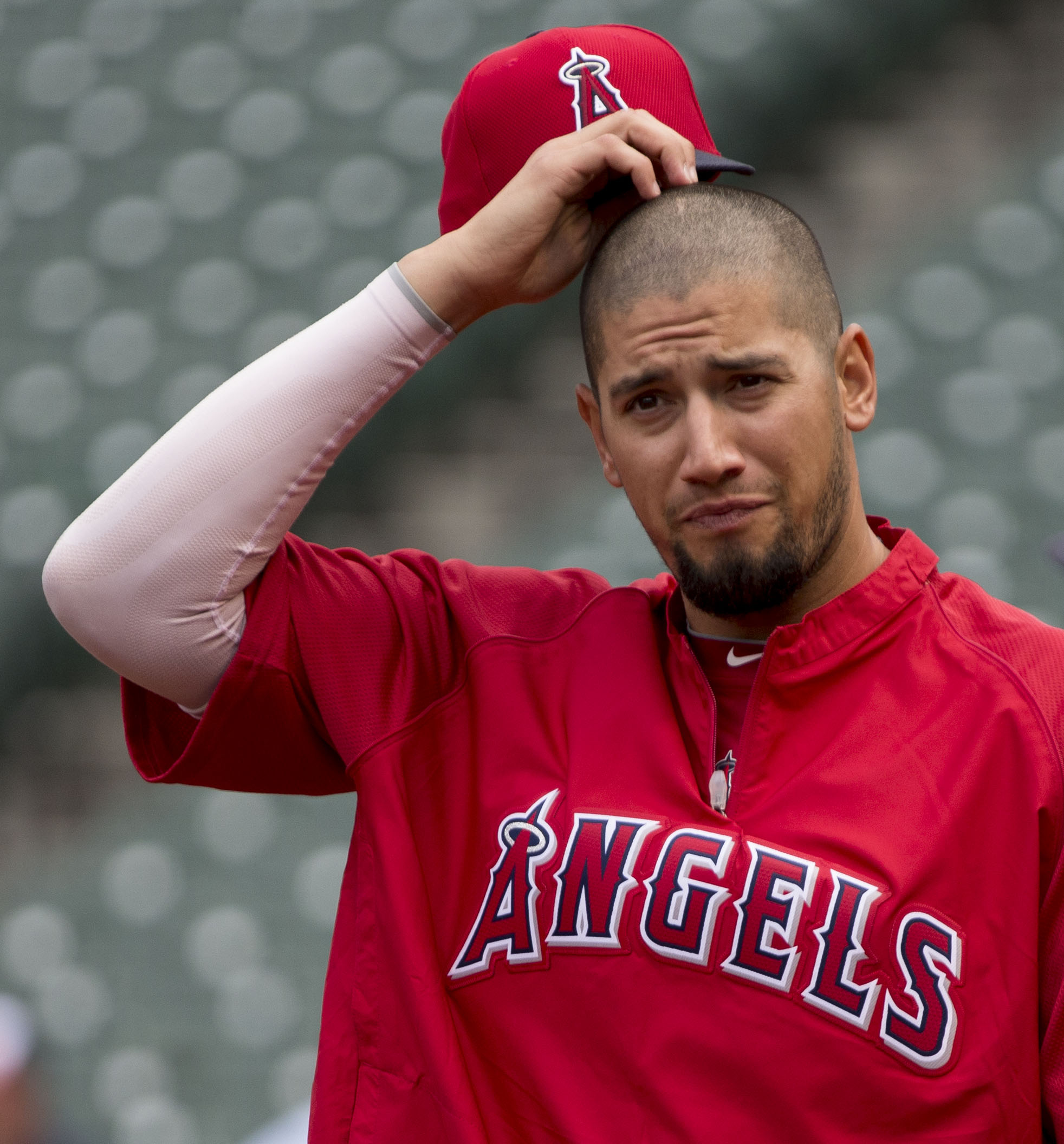
- De La Rosa with the Los Angeles Angels of Anaheim
- Pitcher
- Born: February 1, 1983 (age 43); Torrance, California, U.S.
- Batted: Right Threw: Right

MLB debut
- July 20, 2011, for the Tampa Bay Rays

Last MLB appearance
- June 16, 2014, for the Los Angeles Angels of Anaheim

MLB statistics
- Win–loss record: 6–1
- Earned run average: 4.24
- Strikeouts: 78
- Stats at Baseball Reference

Teams
- Tampa Bay Rays (2011–2012); Los Angeles Angels of Anaheim (2013–2014)

Dane David De La Rosa (born February 1, 1983) is an American former professional baseball relief pitcher. He played in Major League Baseball (MLB) for the Tampa Bay Rays and the Los Angeles Angels of Anaheim.

== Career ==
Prior to playing professionally, De La Rosa attended Elsinore High School in Wildomar, California and then Riverside Community College. De La Rosa was originally drafted in the 34th round of the 2001 Major League Baseball draft by the Texas Rangers, however he opted to go to college instead.

=== New York Yankees ===
He was then drafted by the New York Yankees in the 24th round of the 2002 amateur draft and began his professional career the following season.

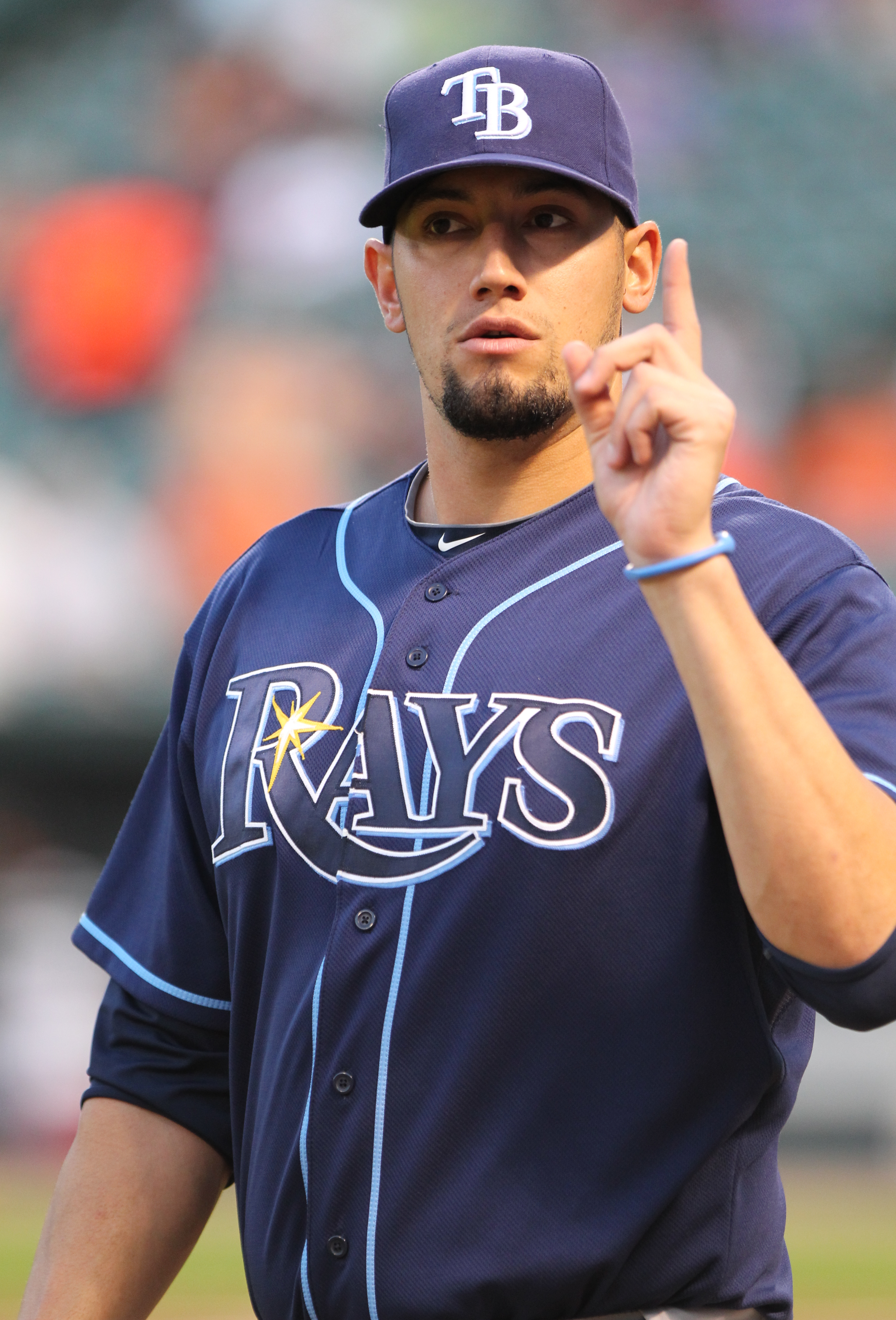
De La Rosa during his tenure with the Tampa Bay Rays in 2011

He played for the GCL Yankees in 2003, going 0–0 with a 3.00 ERA in five games (one start), striking out 12 and allowing only five hits in nine innings. In 2004, he pitched for the GCL Yankees and Staten Island Yankees, going a combined 2–0 with a 2.75 ERA in 15 games (one start). Despite posting a sub-3.00 ERA, he was released by the Yankees after the 2004 season.

=== Yuma Scorpions ===
In 2005, De La Rosa went 1–6 with a 6.45 ERA in 23 games (10 starts) with the independent Yuma Scorpions of the Golden Baseball League. He did not play in 2006.

=== Long Beach Armada ===
In 2007, De La Rosa began the season with the Golden Baseball League's Long Beach Armada, serving as the team's closer and going 2–4 with a 3.69 ERA and 16 saves in 39 appearances.

=== Milwaukee Brewers ===
He was signed by the Milwaukee Brewers in September of that year and appeared in one game for the Helena Brewers. Overall, he went a combined 2–4 with a 3.54 ERA in 40 games in 2007, striking out 56 batters in 48 1/3 innings.

=== Orange County Flyers ===
De La Rosa was back in independent baseball in 2008, pitching for the Golden Baseball League's Orange County Flyers and going 2–2 with a 4.41 ERA in 32 appearances, saving 14 games and striking out 40 in 34 2/3 innings.

=== El Paso Diablos, Victoria Seals, Southern Maryland Blue Crabs ===
In 2009, he pitched for three teams, the El Paso Diablos of the independent American Association, the Victoria Seals of the Golden Baseball League and the Southern Maryland Blue Crabs of the independent Atlantic League. He went 2–5 with a 5.25 ERA in 33 games (six starts) that year, striking out 69 batters in 60 innings.

=== Tampa Bay Rays ===
He signed with the Tampa Bay Rays for the 2010 season, pitching for the Charlotte Stone Crabs and Montgomery Biscuits. He went a combined 9–3 with a 2.01 ERA in 49 relief appearances, striking out 80 batters in 76 innings. He spent most of 2011 in the minor leagues, pitching for the Triple-A Durham Bulls, going 6–5 with a 3.20 ERA in 52 relief appearances and striking out 83 batters in 70.1 innings. He was promoted to the major leagues partway through the season and made his big league debut on July 20. He pitched in seven big league games that year, posting a 9.82 ERA with eight strikeouts in 7.1 innings.

De La Rosa spent the majority of 2012 in the minor leagues as well, with a major league cup of coffee during the season. He pitched in 54 games for the Bulls, going 0–4 with 87 strikeouts, 20 saves and a 2.79 ERA in 67.2 innings. At the major league level, he had a 12.60 ERA in five games for the Rays.

=== Los Angeles Angels of Anaheim ===
The Los Angeles Angels of Anaheim acquired De La Rosa from Tampa Bay on March 27, 2013, in exchange for Steve Geltz. He was called up to the majors after an injury to Jered Weaver. He was outrighted to the Salt Lake Bees on August 29, 2014. De La Rosa elected free agency in October 2014.

=== Baltimore Orioles ===
On January 26, 2015, De La Rosa signed a minor league contract with the Baltimore Orioles. During his time with the Orioles he pitched for their Triple–A affiliate, the Norfolk Tides, where he pitched 10 1/3 innings, compiling a 4.35 ERA with 7 strikeouts.

On June 26, 2015, De La Rosa announced his retirement from professional baseball.

=== Sugar Land Skeeters ===
On June 13, 2017, De La Rosa signed with the Sugar Land Skeeters of the Atlantic League of Professional Baseball. He was released on July 8.
