= Jason Vargas =

American baseball player (born 1983)

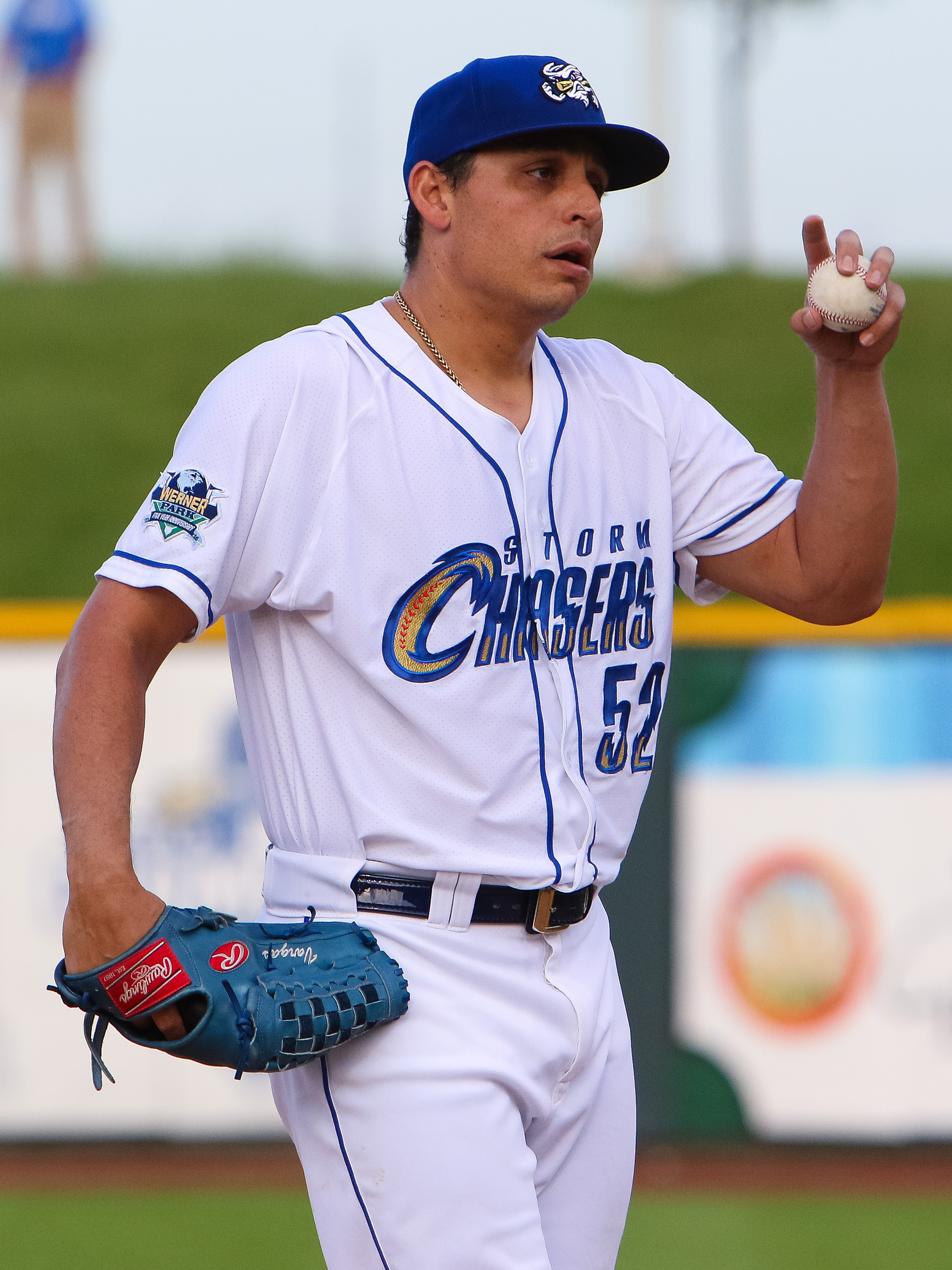
- Vargas with the Omaha Storm Chasers in 2016
- Pitcher
- Born: February 2, 1983 (age 43); Apple Valley, California, U.S.
- Batted: Left Threw: Left

MLB debut
- July 14, 2005, for the Florida Marlins

Last MLB appearance
- September 26, 2019, for the Philadelphia Phillies

MLB statistics
- Win–loss record: 99–99
- Earned run average: 4.29
- Strikeouts: 1,147
- Stats at Baseball Reference

Teams
- Florida Marlins (2005–2006); New York Mets (2007); Seattle Mariners (2009–2012); Los Angeles Angels of Anaheim (2013); Kansas City Royals (2014–2017); New York Mets (2018–2019); Philadelphia Phillies (2019)

Career highlights and awards
- All-Star (2017); AL wins leader (2017)

Jason Matthew Vargas (born February 2, 1983) is an American former professional baseball pitcher. He played in Major League Baseball (MLB) for the Florida Marlins, Seattle Mariners, Los Angeles Angels, Kansas City Royals, New York Mets and Philadelphia Phillies. The Marlins drafted Vargas in the second round of the 2004 MLB draft. He made his major league debut in 2005. In 2017, he was an All-Star and tied for the American League lead in wins.

== Amateur career ==
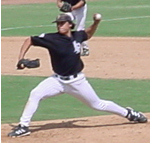
Vargas pitching for Long Beach State in 2004

Vargas was born in Apple Valley, California. He attended Victor Valley High School in Victorville, California, where he played for the school's baseball team under his father, who was head coach. His father retired in 1998, and Vargas transferred to Apple Valley High School in Apple Valley. He graduated in 2001.

The Minnesota Twins drafted him with the 1,273rd pick in the 2001 Major League Baseball draft. He declined to sign and instead enrolled at Louisiana State University (LSU). In his one-season playing college baseball for the LSU Tigers, Vargas had a 1–1 win–loss record with a 3.43 earned run average in 13 games. He also saw occasional playing time as a first baseman and designated hitter. In his first college at bat, he launched a pinch hit grand slam in a victory over Mercer.

Vargas transferred from LSU after the 2002 season to Cypress College for the 2003 season, picking a junior college so he would still be eligible for the draft. He was 11–3 with a 3.10 ERA and 101 strikeouts in 107 1/3 innings as he batted .374. He was the Southern California junior college player of the year for his work on the mound and at the plate. However, as the season wore on, his velocity decreased and he was not drafted in 2003. His lower arm slot and signing bonus demands also depressed his draft stock.

Vargas transferred to California State University, Long Beach to play for the Long Beach State Dirtbags for his junior year. At Long Beach, he increased the velocity on his fastball to 95 miles per hour and improved the break on his curveball. In 2004 Vargas went 7–4 with a 4.14 ERA in 18 games on the mound, while hitting .354 with 14 doubles and five home runs as the team's designated hitter.

== Professional career ==
=== Florida Marlins ===
The Florida Marlins drafted Vargas out of Long Beach State with their second-round pick in the 2004 MLB draft, and he was signed by scout Robby Cosaro; he was a collegiate teammate of Jered Weaver, who was the Anaheim Angels' first-round pick in 2004. Vargas was the 68th player taken overall in the draft. He signed with the Marlins in time to make eight starts in 2004 with their Low A affiliate, the Jamestown Jammers, with whom he went 3–1 with an ERA of 1.96 in eight starts, and was named the #3 prospect in the New York–Penn League by Baseball America. He was the Marlins Organizational Pitcher of the Month for August. He finished 2004 with three starts at the end of the 2004 campaign with one of the Marlins' Single-A affiliates, the Greensboro Grasshoppers of the South Atlantic League. He had a record of 2–1, an ERA of 2.37, and struck out 17 batters in 19 innings pitched.

Vargas was then promising enough that Baseball America listed him 8th among the Marlins' top 10 prospects for 2005, behind Jeremy Hermida, Scott Olsen, Yorman Bazardo, Jason Stokes, Josh Willingham, Eric Reed, and Taylor Tankersley. Baseball America predicted that Vargas would start the season in Greensboro and finish it in High A with the Jupiter Hammerheads; Vargas would very easily surpass that expectation during the 2005 season.

Vargas did start the 2005 season with Greensboro, as was expected, but he advanced quickly through the Marlins' minor-league system. He made five starts with Greensboro, going 4–1 with an earned run average of just 0.80 in five starts and was named South Atlantic League Pitcher of the Week on April 24, and the Marlins Organizational Pitcher of the Month for April, and Minor League Player of the Week honors for the week of April 18–24. He was then promoted to Jupiter, where he went 2–3 with a 3.42 ERA in nine starts; while there, he struck out 60 batters in 55 1/3 innings. With his third club of the year, the Double-A Carolina Mudcats, he made three starts, going 1–0 with a 2.84 ERA and 25 strikeouts in 19 innings pitched. He led all Florida minor league pitchers in 2005 with a 2.50 ERA.

The Marlins noticed Vargas's success in the minor leagues and, when faced with injuries to their own pitching staff, decided to make him the fourth Mudcats pitcher to play in the major leagues in 2005 (the others were Logan Kensing, Olsen, and Bazardo). He made his major-league debut on July 14, 2005, the same day on which the Marlins designated veteran starter Al Leiter for assignment. His first start in the majors would come on July 18 against the Arizona Diamondbacks. Unlike Kensing, Olsen, and Bazardo, Vargas enjoyed nearly immediate success upon his arrival in the major leagues, and after Ismael Valdéz returned from a leg injury, the Marlins moved Brian Moehler to the bullpen and left Vargas in their rotation. On August 21, Vargas started against the Dodgers and pitched his first complete game in the majors, giving up one run on six hits and striking out seven. He finished the 2005 season with a record of 5–5 and a 4.03 ERA in 17 games, 13 of which were starts. Vargas received one third-place vote from the Baseball Writers' Association of America in the 2005 MLB Rookie of the Year voting.

Vargas started the 2006 season in the Marlins' starting rotation, but he struggled there; in five starts, he went 1–1 with a 5.40 ERA, 20 walks, and 14 strikeouts in 23 2/3 innings. For the month of May, the Marlins moved him to the bullpen, where he gave up one run in 5 1/3 innings over his first three appearances. In his fourth appearance out of the bullpen, he allowed eight runs (seven earned) over 3 1/3 innings; the Marlins optioned him to the Triple-A Albuquerque Isotopes on May 14. Vargas started improving with Albuquerque, going 2–2 with a 4.54 ERA in seven starts and earning another promotion to the major leagues on July 6.

However, over his next three games with the Marlins, all in relief, Vargas allowed 13 runs (12 earned), four home runs, and five walks in 10 1/3 innings; he struck out five batters. The Marlins sent him back to Albuquerque on July 29, where he stayed for the rest of Albuquerque's season. Vargas continued to struggle in his second stint with Albuquerque, allowing 38 earned runs on 56 hits in 31 1/3 innings.

The Marlins did not call him up again in 2006 after the major-league rosters expanded in September. Overall, Vargas went 1–2 with a 7.33 ERA in 12 games (five of which were starts) for the Marlins, and 3–6 with a 7.43 ERA in 13 starts for the Isotopes in 2006.

=== New York Mets ===
On November 20, 2006, the Marlins traded Vargas to the New York Mets along with fellow starting pitcher Adam Bostick in exchange for relief pitchers Matt Lindstrom and Henry Owens. Vargas began the 2007 season with the Triple-A New Orleans Zephyrs, compiling a 2–3 record with a 5.30 ERA. At the time, Mets manager Willie Randolph said Vargas was pitching "so-so" in the minors but liked his stuff.

He was called up to the Mets on May 13 after an injured Moisés Alou was sent to the disabled list, and took over the rotation spot previously held by Mike Pelfrey, who was optioned to New Orleans after posting an 0–5 record in 6 outings. His first outing as a Met was on May 17, a no decision in a 6–5 victory over the Chicago Cubs. His next outing as a Met was on July 3 against the Colorado Rockies. Vargas pitched 3 1/3 innings, giving up nine earned runs. He pitched only 10 1/3 innings for the Mets in 2007.

Vargas had a bone spur removed from his left elbow in October and had surgery to repair a torn labrum in his left hip on March 17, 2008. He missed the entire 2008 season.

=== Seattle Mariners ===
On December 10, 2008, Vargas was one of seven players sent to the Seattle Mariners in a three-team trade between the Mets, Mariners, and the Cleveland Indians.

Vargas was optioned down to the Triple-A Tacoma Rainiers on July 7, 2009, to make roster room for Chris Shelton. On September 1, Vargas was called up to the Majors. He had been 4–3 with a 3.14 ERA in nine starts with Tacoma. In 2009 with Seattle, he was 3–6 with a 4.91 ERA in 23 games, 14 of which were starts.

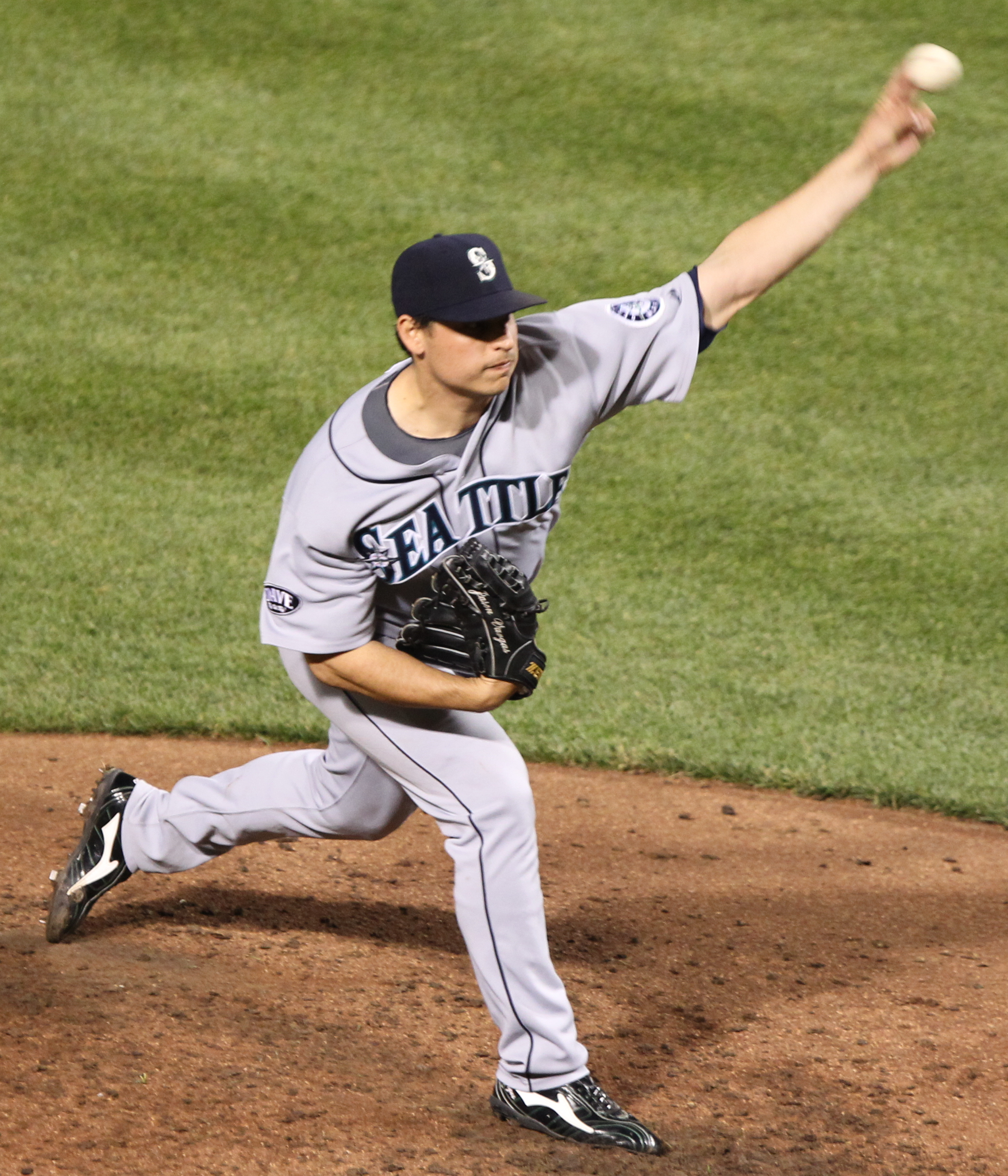
Vargas pitching for the Mariners in 2011

Vargas started the 2010 Mariner season in the starting rotation, and through June proved to be one of the most surprising success stories on the troubled Seattle team's roster. Through 14 starts he had posted a 6–2 record over 91 1/3 innings, with a 2.66 ERA, 60 strikeouts, and 23 walks. By the end of the season Vargas had thrown 192 innings over 31 starts, and posted a 9–12 record with a 3.78 ERA and 116 strikeouts. He kept left-handed batters to a .200 average, which was ninth-lowest in the American League (AL).

In 2011 he was 10–13 with a 4.25 ERA in 32 starts. His three shutouts were third in the league, his four complete games were fourth in the league, and his 13 losses were seventh in the league.

In January 2012, the Mariners and Vargas agreed on a 1-year, $4.85 million contract. In July, Vargas went 5–0 in six starts, had an AL-best 1.64 ERA, and was named the AL Pitcher of the Month. For the season, he was 14–11 with a 3.85 ERA, his 33 starts were fourth in the league, and his 217 1/3 innings pitched were sixth in the American League, while his 35 home runs given up were second in the league.

=== Los Angeles Angels of Anaheim ===
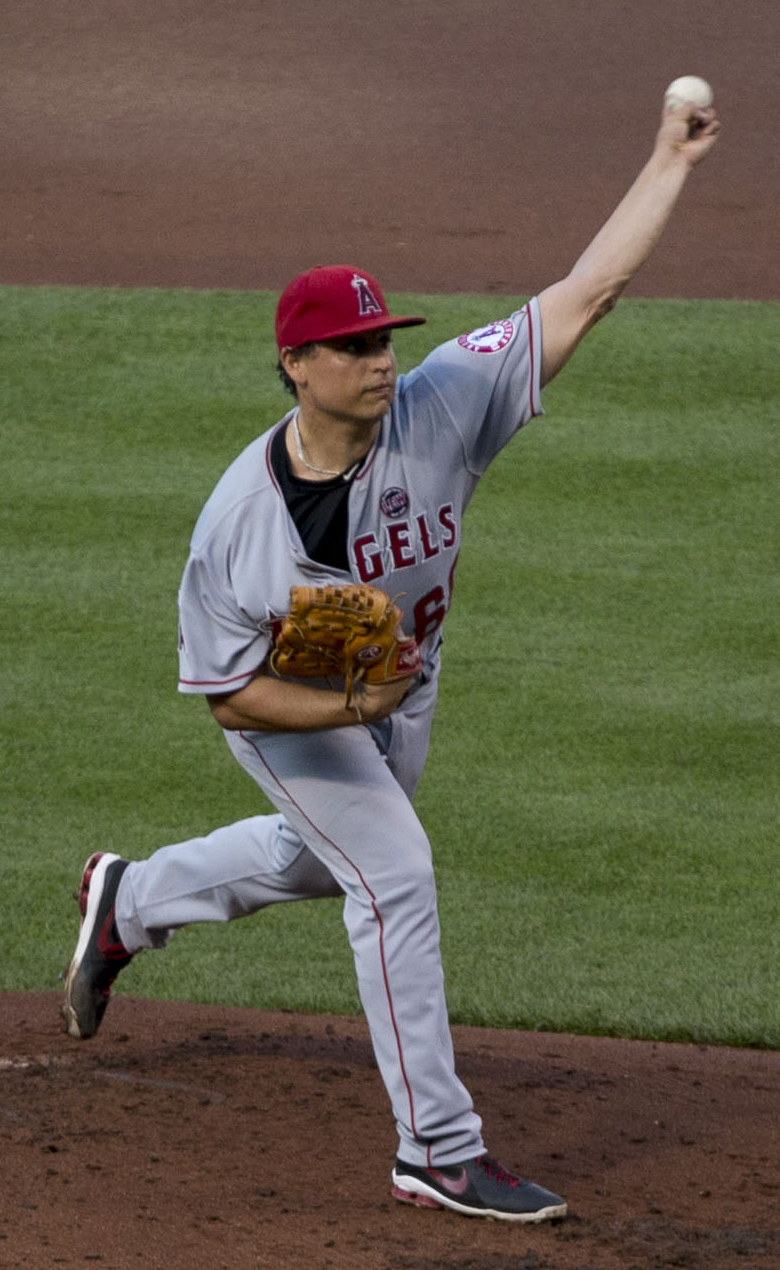
Vargas pitching for the Angels in 2013

On December 19, 2012, Vargas was traded to the Los Angeles Angels for first baseman Kendrys Morales. In May 2013 he was again AL Pitcher of the Month. In 2013, he was 9–8 with a 4.02 ERA in 24 starts, and his two shutouts and his three complete games were both third in the league. He became a free agent following the season.

=== Kansas City Royals ===
On November 21, 2013, Vargas signed a four-year, $32 million contract with the Kansas City Royals. He opened the 2014 season as the number three starter for the Royals and posted a career-best 3.71 ERA over 187 innings, as he was 11–10 in 30 starts. His 1.97 walks per 9 innings tied for 10th in the AL and was third-best among AL left-handers.

On July 21, 2015, during a game against the Pittsburgh Pirates, Vargas was forced to leave the game after throwing only 26 pitches, with an apparent injury to his throwing arm. The next day, Vargas was diagnosed with a torn UCL in his left elbow, forcing him to undergo Tommy John surgery and miss the remainder of the 2015 season and much of the 2016 season. For 2015, he was 5–2 with a 3.98 ERA in nine starts. Although his season ended prematurely before the Royals' World Series run in 2015, he did receive a World Series ring.

On September 17, 2016, he made his first start following his recovery from surgery, against the Chicago White Sox. In 2016 he pitched only 12 innings, all of which were scoreless.

The 2017 season was Vargas's fourth year with the Kansas City Royals, and his first full season since undergoing Tommy John surgery. Vargas started strong, going 12–3 in the first half, and was named to the AL All-Star team for the MLB All-Star Game. It was the only All-Star selection of his career. In the second half Vargas struggled, posting a 2–8 record, including a four-game losing streak. He rebounded, however, winning four straight decisions in September, and in the process establishing a career-high for wins. Vargas finished the season with an 18–11 record and an ERA of 4.16 in 179 2/3 innings, with his 18 wins tied for the AL lead and his 32 starts ninth in the league. He led major league pitchers in percent of balls pulled against him (48.8%). He also led all the majors in changeup percentage (32.7%). On defense, his 23 assists as a pitcher were fifth in the league, his 1.60 range factor per nine innings was fourth in the league, and he had a perfect 1.000 fielding percentage. He became a free agent following the season.

=== New York Mets (second stint) ===
On February 18, 2018, Vargas signed with the Mets for two years and $16 million, plus an $8 million option for a third year. On March 16, Vargas suffered a non-displaced fracture of the hamate bone in his right hand. He missed the first month of the season due to the broken right hand. On June 25, he was once again placed on the disabled list, with a calf injury. On August 29, he struck out his 1,000th batter becoming one of 16 active left-handers to reach that milestone. In 2018, he posted a 7–9 record with a 5.77 ERA in 20 starts.

On June 23, 2019, Vargas threatened to "knock out" a Newsday in the Mets locker room after a game against the Cubs. The next day, the Mets fined Vargas $10,000 for his actions. At the time that he was traded in 2019, he was 6–5 with a 4.01 ERA for the Mets, in 19 games, 18 of which were starts.

=== Philadelphia Phillies ===
On July 29, 2019, the Mets traded Vargas and $2.9 million to the Philadelphia Phillies for Double-A minor league catcher Austin Bossart. In 2019 with the Phillies, Vargas was 1–4 with a 5.37 ERA, and in 11 starts he pitched 55 1/3 innings. Vargas became a free agent following the season on November 4, 2019.

== Pitches ==
Vargas threw four pitches: a two-seam and four-seam, 85 mph fastball, a 71 mph curveball, and a 79 mph changeup.

== Personal life ==
Vargas married his high school sweetheart. They have three children.

Vargas's father, after serving as his high school baseball coach, became the athletic director at the University of Redlands. Vargas' second cousin, Randy Velarde, played in MLB for 10 seasons. Another cousin, Ronnie Corona, played in the minor leagues after also pitching at Victor Valley High School and Cypress College.

Vargas's number was retired by the Apple Valley High School baseball team in 2014.
