= Dan Straily =

American baseball player (born 1988)

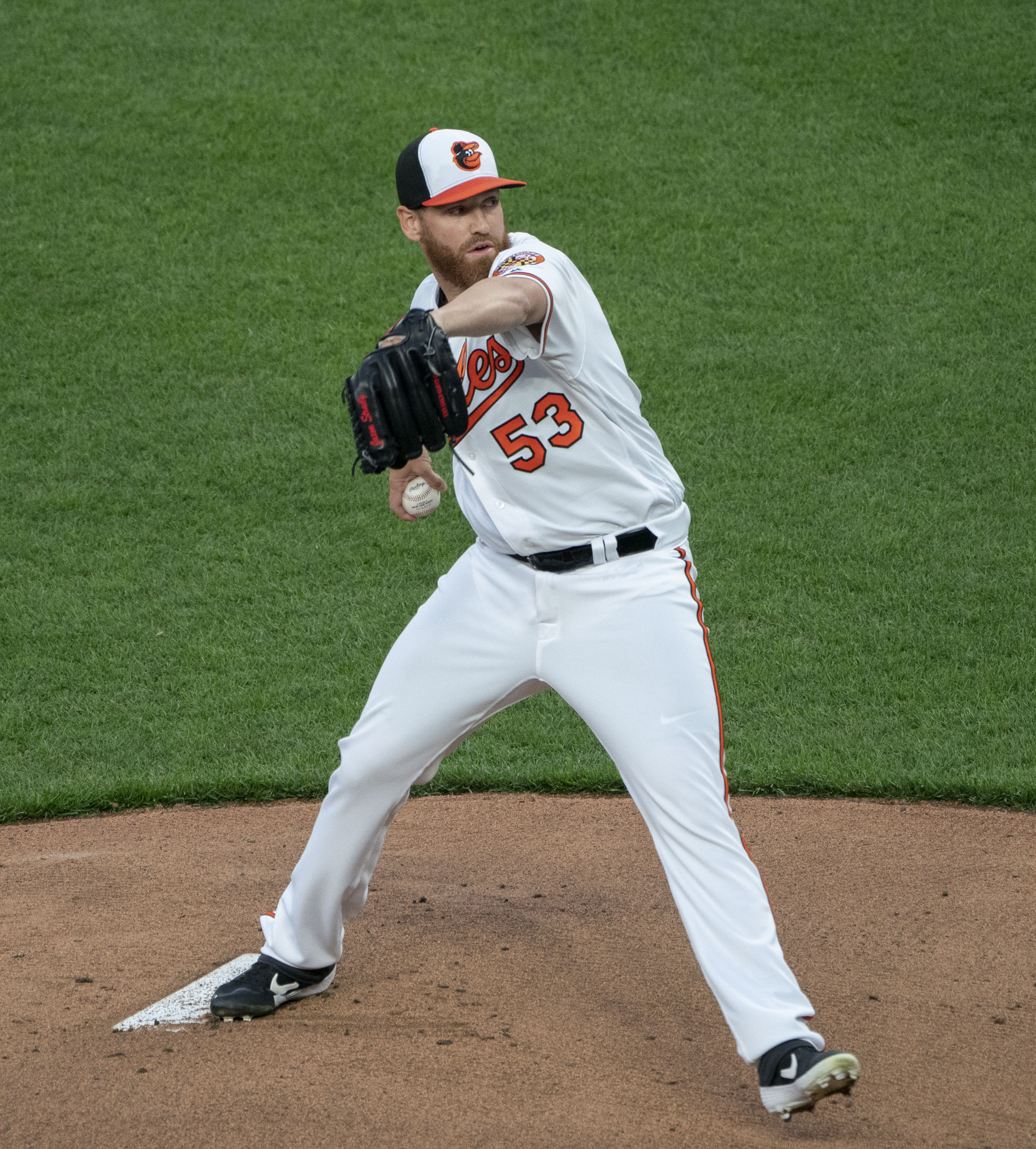
- Straily with the Baltimore Orioles in 2019
- Starting pitcher
- Born: December 1, 1988 (age 37); Redlands, California, U.S.
- Batted: Right Threw: Right

Professional debut
- MLB: August 3, 2012, for the Oakland Athletics
- KBO: May 5, 2020, for the Lotte Giants

Last appearance
- MLB: June 18, 2019, for the Baltimore Orioles
- KBO: July 9, 2023, for the Lotte Giants

MLB statistics
- Win–loss record: 44–40
- Earned run average: 4.56
- Strikeouts: 681

KBO statistics
- Win–loss record: 32–23
- Earned run average: 3.29
- Strikeouts: 494
- Stats at Baseball Reference

Teams
- Oakland Athletics (2012–2014); Chicago Cubs (2014); Houston Astros (2015); Cincinnati Reds (2016); Miami Marlins (2017–2018); Baltimore Orioles (2019); Lotte Giants (2020–2023)

Career highlights and awards
- KBO Strikeout leader (2020)

Daniel Steven Straily (born December 1, 1988) is an American former professional baseball pitcher. He played in Major League Baseball (MLB) for the Oakland Athletics, Houston Astros, Cincinnati Reds, Miami Marlins, and Baltimore Orioles, and in the KBO League for the Lotte Giants. The Athletics selected Straily in the 24th round of the 2009 MLB draft, and he made his MLB debut with them in 2012.

== Early life ==
Straily was born in Redlands, California, to Sarah Jackson (née Beightler) and Steven Straily. He has an older sister, Larissa. The family moved to Pendleton, Oregon, when he was between kindergarten and first grade. Straily started his baseball career playing Little League Baseball and in the Babe Ruth League in Pendleton. He played his first two years of high school baseball for the Pendleton Buckaroos at Pendleton High School.

The family moved again prior to the start of Straily's junior year in high school, this time to Springfield, Oregon. Straily attended Thurston High School in Springfield, and graduated in 2006. Playing for the baseball team, as a senior he was second-team All-Mid-Western League after going 7–3 with a 2.48 ERA in 62 innings with 65 strikeouts.

Straily began his college career at Western Oregon University, where he played college baseball for the Western Oregon Wolves for one year. He then transferred to Marshall University, where he played for the Marshall Thundering Herd baseball team as a walk-on, and majored in Business Administration.

== Professional career ==
=== Oakland Athletics ===
The Oakland Athletics drafted Straily in the 24th round, with the 723rd overall selection, of the 2009 Major League Baseball draft. He began his professional career with the Vancouver Canadians of the Low–A Northwest League in 2009. In 16 games pitched (11 starts), Straily had a record of 5–3, a 4.12 earned run average (ERA), and 66 strikeouts (seventh in the league) in 59 innings. His 5 wins were tied for 6th-most in the league.

In 2010, Straily was promoted to the Kane County Cougars of the Single–A Midwest League. There, he posted a 10–7 record, a 4.32 ERA, and 149 strikeouts (second in the league, and second in the A's farm system) in 148 innings (tied for fourth in the league) in 28 games pitched (all starts; tied for second in the league). Straily's 13 home runs allowed were tied for fourth in the league, and his 10 wins were tied for fifth in the league, and his 61 walks were seventh.

For 2011, Straily was promoted to the Stockton Ports of the High–A California League. There, Straily went 11–9 with a 3.87 ERA and 154 strikeouts (fifth in the league, and third in the A's farm system) in 160 2/3 innings (fourth) in 28 games (26 starts), and was the April 25 California League Player of the Week. His 14 HBP tied for second in the league, and his 11 wins tied for seventh.

To begin 2012, Straily was promoted to the Midland RockHounds of the Double–A Texas League. He posted a 3–4 record, a 3.38 ERA, and 108 strikeouts (6th in the league) in 85 1/3 innings in 14 starts. Straily was the May 21 and June 11 Texas League Player of the Week. He received a promotion to Sacramento River Cats of the Triple–A Pacific Coast League (PCL). His success continued in Triple-A, where Straily went 6–3 with a 2.03 ERA (third in the league), and 82 strikeouts in 66 2/3 innings, in 11 starts. He was the July 16 PCL Player of the Week. Through August 2, 2012, Straily led all of professional baseball with 175 strikeouts. He was named a Texas League mid-season and post-season All Star, Baseball America Minor League All Star, and MiLB.com Organization All Star. Overall, he led all of minor league baseball in strikeouts, with 190. On August 2, Straily was called up to join the Athletics' starting rotation. Straily made his Major League debut August 3, and struck out the first batter he faced, Brett Lawrie, looking. In the major leagues in 2012, he was 2–1 with a 3.89 ERA in 39.1 innings in seven starts. Baseball America named him the A's sixth-best prospect, and as having the best slider and changeup.

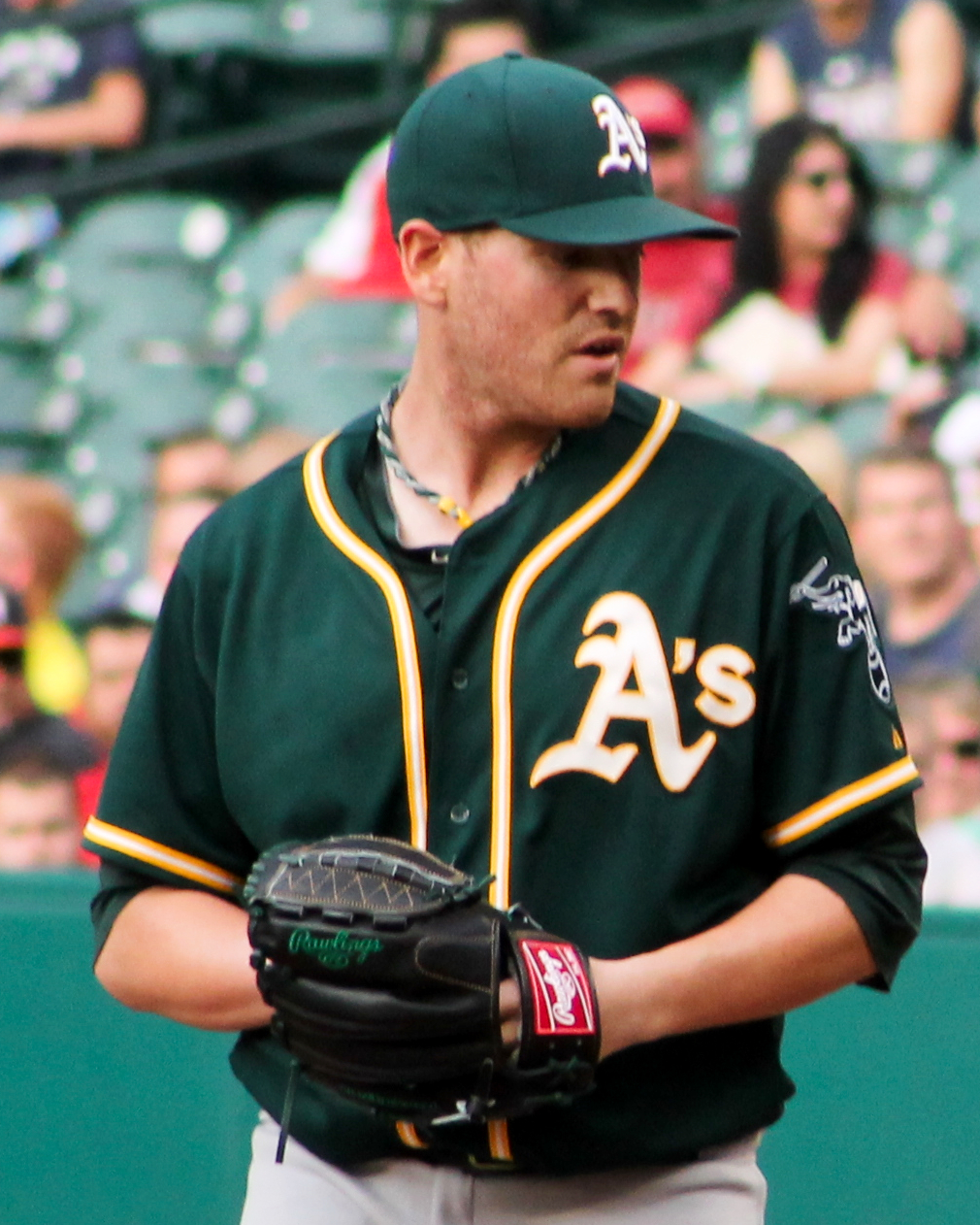
Straily in April 2014

Pre-2013, Baseball Prospectus named him the # 85 prospect in baseball. On April 1, 2013, Straily was named in the Opening Day roster for the Oakland Athletics as a starting pitcher, but made only one start before getting optioned to Sacramento when Bartolo Colón returned from his suspension. In Triple–A, he was 3–1 with a 1.14 ERA with 33 strikeouts in 31 2/3 innings over five starts. He was the May 26 PCL Player of the Week. After filling in once for Brett Anderson on April 29, Straily permanently took Anderson's spot in the rotation when he was placed on the disabled list. Straily finished the season as the fourth starter, and even started Game 4 of the ALDS against the Tigers, giving up three runs in six innings. In 27 starts on the year in the majors, Straily went 10–8 with 12 quality starts and a 3.96 ERA, striking out 124 in 152 1/3 innings.

Pitching for the Athletics at the beginning of the 2014 season, Straily was 1–2 with a 4.93 ERA in 38 1/3 innings in seven starts.

=== Chicago Cubs ===
On July 4, 2014, Straily was traded to the Chicago Cubs, with top shortstop prospect Addison Russell and outfielder Billy McKinney, for pitchers Jeff Samardzija and Jason Hammel. Straily had been pitching for the A's Triple–A affiliate. Straily reported to the Iowa Cubs of the PCL, but was called up to Chicago on August 16. Straily started for the Cubs that night against the New York Mets, giving up seven runs in five and a third innings and picking up the loss. The next day, Straily was optioned back to Iowa. In 2014 with the Cubs, he was 0–1 with a 11.85 ERA in 13.2 innings.

=== Houston Astros ===
On January 19, 2015, Straily and infielder Luis Valbuena were traded to the Houston Astros for center fielder Dexter Fowler. Pitching for the Triple–A Fresno Grizzlies, he was 10–9 record with a 4.77 ERA in 122 2/3 innings as he struck out 124 batters, leading the Pacific Coast League. Pitching for the Astros in 2015, he was 0–1 with a 5.40 ERA in 16.2 innings.

=== Cincinnati Reds ===
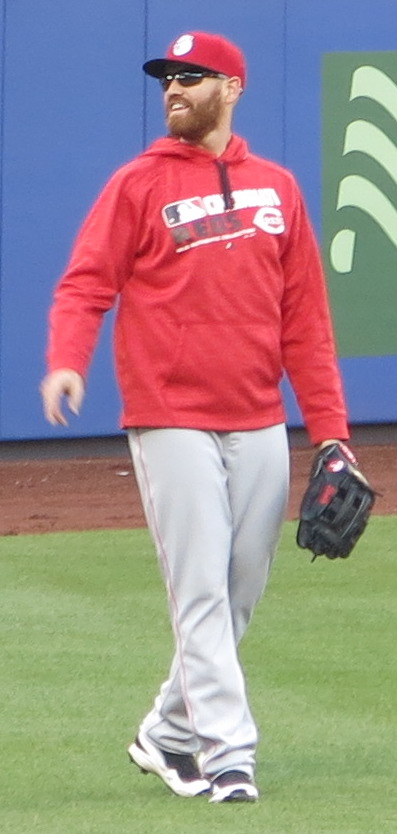
Straily with the Reds in 2016

On March 28, 2016, the Astros traded Straily to the San Diego Padres for catcher Erik Kratz. On April 1, he was designated for assignment by the Padres and claimed off of waivers by the Cincinnati Reds. He began the 2016 season as a long reliever, but soon entered the Reds' starting rotation. Straily pitched to a 14–8 record and a 3.76 ERA over 191.1 innings for the Reds in 2016, and led the NL in home runs allowed (31), was second in sacrifice hits (11), was fourth in HBP (11), was fifth in walks (73), and was seventh with 7.244 hits/9 IP. On defense, he had a perfect 1.000 fielding percentage.

=== Miami Marlins ===
On January 19, 2017, the Reds traded Straily to the Miami Marlins for Luis Castillo, Austin Brice, and Isaiah White. Straily posted a winning record for the second straight season, finishing 10–9 with a 4.26 ERA and a career-high 170 strikeouts in 181.2 innings, and leading the NL with 33 starts, as he was second in the NL with 31 home runs allowed and 6th with 8 sacrifice hits allowed.

On June 19, 2018, Straily was ejected for the first time in his career when he hit Buster Posey with a pitch with warnings in place. On June 21, Straily was suspended for five games with an undisclosed fine for hitting Posey. In 2018 he was 5–6 with a 4.12 ERA in 122.1 innings over 23 starts. He led Major League Baseball pitchers with a .138 batting average against when facing a lineup for the third time.

Straily and the Marlins agreed on a $5 million salary for the 2019 season. However, the Marlins released Straily on March 25, 2019.

=== Baltimore Orioles ===
Straily signed with the Baltimore Orioles on April 5, 2019. Straily was designated for assignment on June 20. He had a 9.42 ERA in 47 2/3 innings over 14 games (8 starts) with 22 home runs and 52 earned runs against him before his designation.

=== Philadelphia Phillies ===
On July 31, 2019, the Philadelphia Phillies acquired Straily from the Orioles in exchange for cash considerations, and assigned him to the Triple–A Lehigh Valley IronPigs. He elected free agency on October 1.

=== Lotte Giants ===
On December 14, 2019, Straily signed a one-year, $800,000 contract with the Lotte Giants of the KBO League. He excelled in his first season, registering a 15–4 record with a 2.50 ERA and a league-leading 205 strikeouts. He became the first KBO pitcher in eight years to reach 200 strikeouts in a season. On December 2, 2020, Straily re-signed with the Giants on a one-year, $1.2MM contract that includes $500K in incentives. He posted a 10–12 record with a 4.07 ERA and 164 strikeouts over 31 starts. Straily was not re-signed for the 2022 season and became a free agent.

=== Arizona Diamondbacks ===
On February 4, 2022, Straily signed a minor league contract with the Arizona Diamondbacks, being assigned to their Triple-A affiliate Reno Aces. In 15 games (12 starts) for Reno, he struggled to a 6.35 ERA with 53 strikeouts across 62 1/3 innings pitched. Straily was released by the Diamondbacks organization on August 1.

=== Lotte Giants (second stint) ===
On August 3, 2022, Straily signed with the Lotte Giants of the KBO League. He made 11 starts for the team down the stretch, posting a 4–2 record and 2.31 ERA with 55 strikeouts in 62 1/3 innings of work.

On November 23, 2022, Straily re-signed with Lotte on a one-year, $1 million contract for the 2023 season. In 16 starts for Lotte in 2023, he registered a 3–5 record and 4.37 ERA with 70 strikeouts in 80 1/3 innings pitched. On July 18, 2023, Straily was released by the Giants following the signing of Aaron Wilkerson.

=== Chicago Cubs (second stint) ===
On April 23, 2024, Straily signed with the Long Island Ducks of the Atlantic League of Professional Baseball. However, two days later, Straily's contract was purchased by the Chicago Cubs organization. In 17 games (16 starts) for the Triple–A Iowa Cubs, he struggled to a 1–7 record and 5.49 ERA with 75 strikeouts across 78 2/3 innings pitched. Straily was released by the Cubs organization on August 8.

=== Diablos Rojos del México ===
On January 21, 2025, Straily signed with the Diablos Rojos del México of the Mexican League. In eight appearances (seven starts) for México, he struggled to a 1-2 record and 9.00 ERA with 24 strikeouts over 32 innings of work. Straily was released by the Diablos on June 26.

On July 5, 2025, Straily announced his retirement from professional baseball via social media.

== Scouting report ==
Straily is 6 feet 2 inches (1.88 m) and 215 pounds (98 kg). He is a four-pitch power pitcher; he walked 3.5 per 9 innings in the major leagues through July 2019. Straily has a four-seam fastball that sits around 91 miles per hour (146 km/h) and can reach 95 miles per hour (153 km/h). He also has a "swing-and-miss" slider (84 mph), an "early-in-count" curveball (77 mph), and an above-average changeup (85 mph).

== Personal life ==
Straily married Amanda Jean Miller on December 15, 2012, in Springfield, Oregon.
