= Michael Kohn =

American baseball player (born 1986)

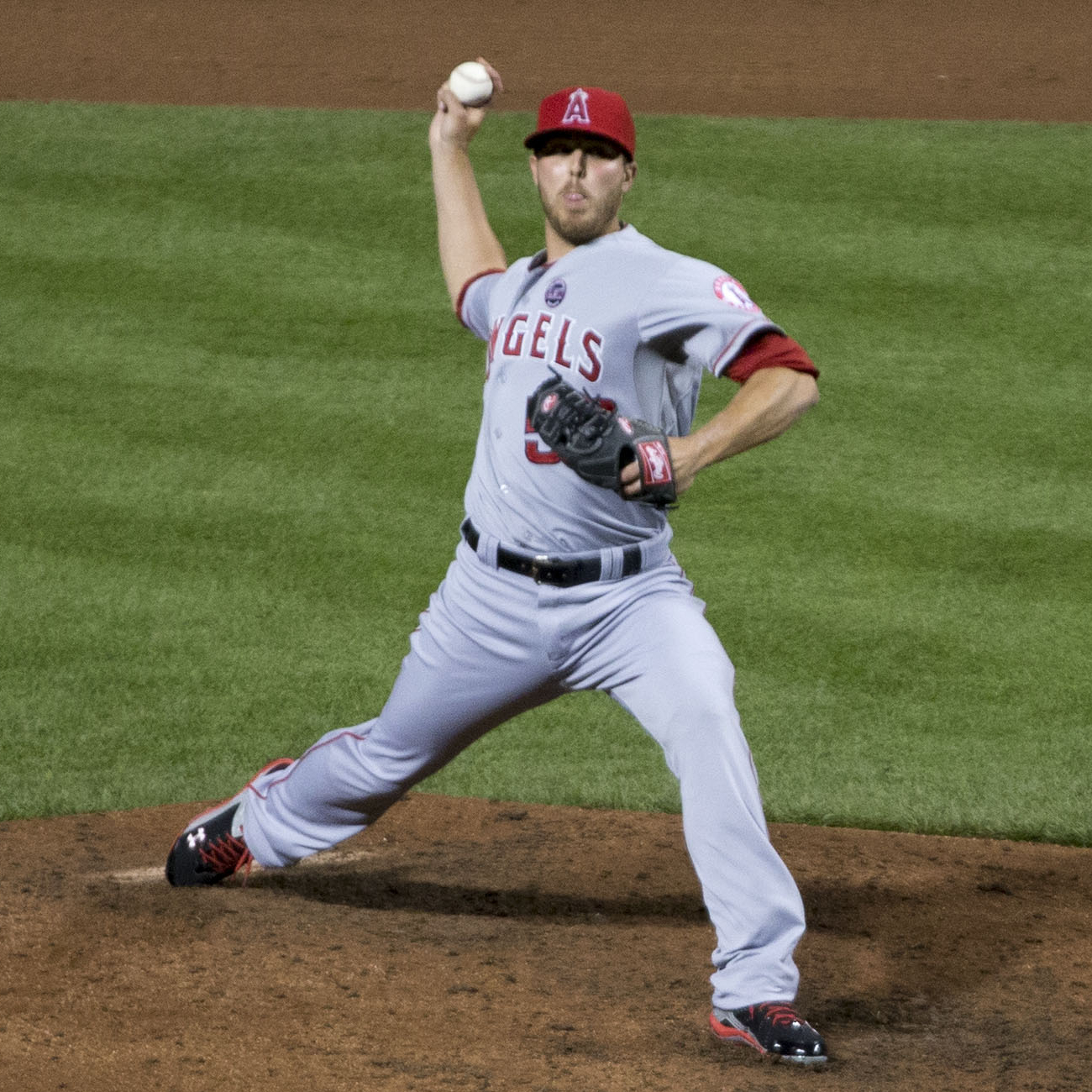
- Kohn with the Los Angeles Angels of Anaheim
- Pitcher
- Born: June 26, 1986 (age 40); Camden, South Carolina, U.S.
- Batted: Right Threw: Right

MLB debut
- July 26, 2010, for the Los Angeles Angels of Anaheim

Last MLB appearance
- May 4, 2015, for the Atlanta Braves

MLB statistics
- Win–loss record: 5–6
- Earned run average: 3.52
- Strikeouts: 111
- Stats at Baseball Reference

Teams
- Los Angeles Angels of Anaheim (2010–2011, 2013–2014); Atlanta Braves (2015)

Michael Thomas Kohn (born June 26, 1986) is an American former professional baseball pitcher. He was drafted by the Los Angeles Angels in the 13th round (409th overall) of the 2008 Major League Baseball draft after playing college baseball at the College of Charleston. He made his Major League Baseball (MLB) debut with the Angels in 2010, and also played for the Atlanta Braves.

== Professional career ==
=== Los Angeles Angels of Anaheim ===
Kohn made his major league debut on July 26, 2010, against the Boston Red Sox at Angel Stadium of Anaheim. He finished the season appearing in 24 games, going 2–0. In 2011, Kohn struggled with control, walking 9 in 12.1 innings and allowing 10 runs. He spent the entire 2012 season on the disabled list due to Tommy John surgery. Fully healthy in 2013, Kohn was a bullpen mainstay for the Angels, appearing in a career high 63 games. On September 2, 2014, Kohn was designated for assignment. On September 8, 2014, Kohn chose free agency rather than accepting a demotion to the minors.

=== Tampa Bay Rays ===
On October 16, 2014, Kohn signed a major league contract with the Tampa Bay Rays. He was designated for assignment on November 20.

=== Atlanta Braves ===
On December 4, 2014, Kohn was signed to a minor league deal by the Atlanta Braves, a deal that included an invite to Spring Training. He was sent to minor league camp on March 30, 2015, and began the season with the Gwinnett Braves. On April 24, Kohn was recalled and made his Braves' debut two days later. He became a free agent on October 5, 2015.

=== Minnesota Twins ===
On July 21, 2017, Kohn signed a minor league deal with the Minnesota Twins. He spent the year split between the rookie–level Gulf Coast League Twins, High–A Fort Myers Miracle, and Triple–A Rochester Red Wings. In 13 appearances between the three affiliates, Kohn logged a 1.38 ERA with 18 strikeouts across 13.0 innings pitched. He was released by the Twins organization on March 25, 2018.

=== Arizona Diamondbacks ===
On February 8, 2019, Kohn signed a minor league contract with the Arizona Diamondbacks. He made 27 appearances split between the rookie–level Arizona League Diamondbacks, Double–A Jackson Generals, and Triple–A Reno Aces, accumulating a 4.03 ERA with 50 strikeouts and 9 saves. Kohn elected free agency following the season on November 4.

=== Los Angeles Angels (second stint) ===
On February 1, 2020, Kohn signed a minor league contract with the Los Angeles Angels. Kohn did not play in a game in 2020 due to the cancellation of the minor league season because of the COVID-19 pandemic. He became a free agent on November 2.

On March 25, 2021, Kohn announced his retirement from professional baseball on Instagram.
