= 2013 Houston Astros season =

52nd season in franchise history, first in American League

2013 Houston Astros
- League: American League
- Division: West
- Ballpark: Minute Maid Park
- City: Houston, Texas
- Record: 51–111 (.315)
- Divisional place: 5th
- Owners: Jim Crane
- General managers: Jeff Luhnow
- Managers: Bo Porter
- Television: CSN Houston (Bill Brown, Alan Ashby, Geoff Blum)
- Radio: Sportstalk 790 (Robert Ford, Steve Sparks, Milo Hamilton); KLAT (Spanish) (Francisco Romero, Alex Treviño)
- Stats: ESPN.com; Baseball Reference

The 2013 Houston Astros season was the 52nd season for the Major League Baseball (MLB) franchise located in Houston, Texas, their 49th as the Astros, and 14th at Minute Maid Park. Further, it was the Astros' inaugural season as members of both the American League (AL) and AL West division, after having spent their first 51 seasons in the National League (NL). The Astros entered the season with a 55–107 record and last-place finish in the NL Central division, 42 games behind the division-champion Cincinnati Reds, their most losses recorded to date.

The 2013 season was the first for Bo Porter as manager, the 21st in Astros' franchise history, succeeding Tony DeFrancesco. On March 31, the Astros won their first contest and Opening Day as an American League team, 8–2, while hosting their in-state rivals, the Texas Rangers, also the 4,000th win in franchise history. Bud Norris was the Astros' Opening Day starting pitcher. In the first round of the June MLB draft, the Astros selected pitcher Mark Appel as the first overall pick.

Catcher Jason Castro represented the Astros at the MLB All-Star Game and played for the American League, his lone career selection. On July 19, outfielder Brandon Barnes hit for the cycle while going 5-for-5 for the eighth cycle in franchise history.

The Astros concluded their regular season with a 51–111 record, in last place the AL West, 45 games behind the Oakland Athletics, and as well as most losses in the major leagues. This was Houston's fourth consecutive season since 2010 with more defeats than the year prior and their unprecedented third successive 100-loss season, another new club record for losses, and fewest wins by any MLB club since the 2004 Arizona Diamondbacks, who had an identical 51–111 record.

== Offseason ==
The Houston Astros concluded the 2012 campaign with a 55–107 (.340) record, in sixth and last place in the National League (NL) Central division, 42 games behind the division-champion Cincinnati Reds.

With Houston moving from the National League (NL) to the American League (AL), the structure in MLB shifted 16 of 30 teams occupying the NL to five teams in each of baseball's six division. The AL West, the gaining division, had four teams prior to the move, while the NL Central, the donor group, had six. Hence, the move equaled the number of teams to 15 in each league. The Astros became the first franchise since the 1998 Milwaukee Brewers to switch leagues. Milwaukee had joined Houston in the NL Central division, adding the sixth team in the division.

== Regular season ==
=== Summary ===
==== Inaugural game in the American League ====
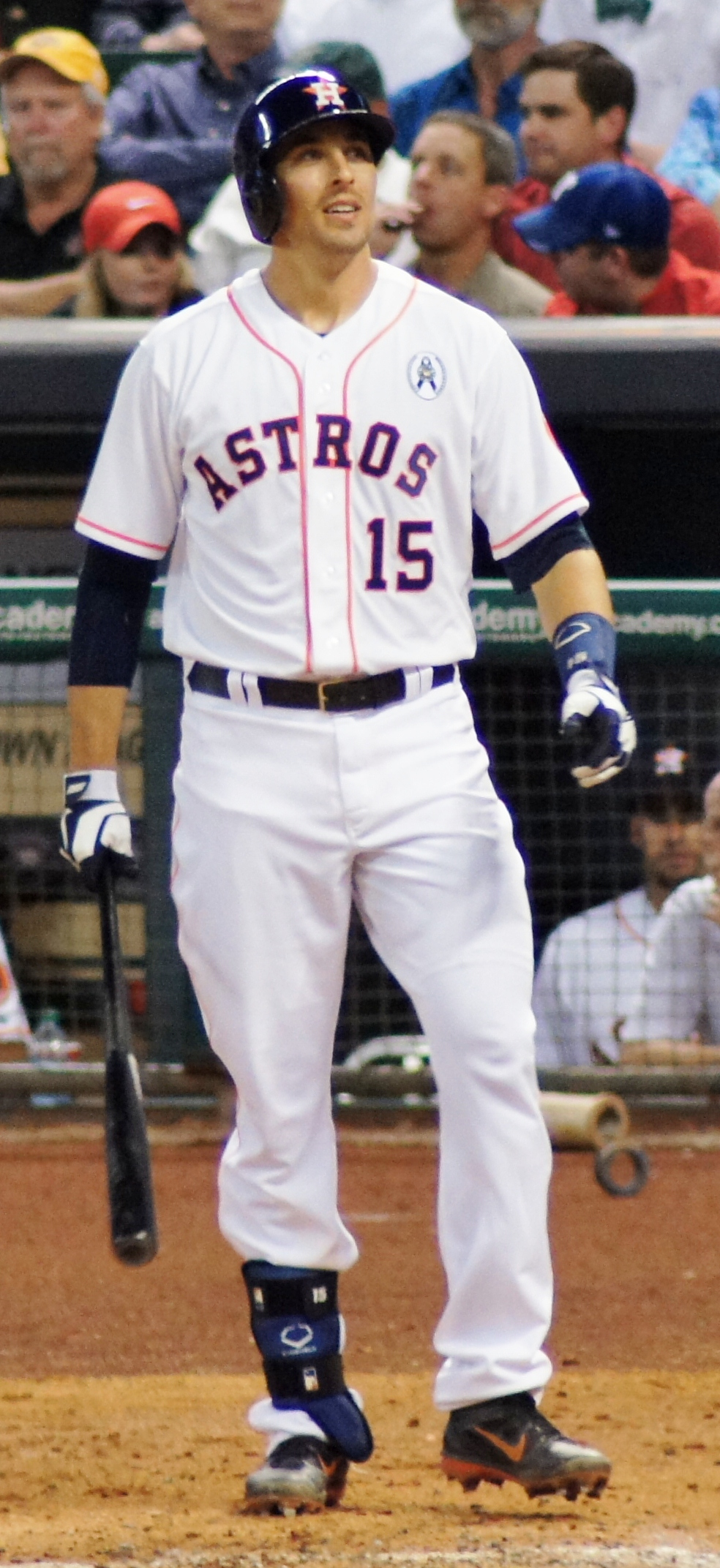
Jason Castro, All-Star for Houston in 2013.

Opening Day starting lineup
Uniform	Player	Position
27	Jose Altuve	Second baseman
29	Brett Wallace	First baseman
23	Chris Carter	Left fielder
12	Carlos Peña	Designated hitter
44	Justin Maxwell	Center fielder
15	Jason Castro	Catcher
30	Matt Dominguez	Third baseman
2	Brandon Barnes	Right fielder
13	Ronny Cedeño	Shortstop
20	Bud Norris	Pitcher
Venue: Minute Maid Park • Final: Houston 8, Texas 2 Sources:

Houston's first-ever Opening Day as an American League club took place on March 31, where they hosted in-state rivals, the Texas Rangers, at Minute Maid Park. As a result of moving to the American League, Houston's rivalry with Texas transformed from interleague to intradivision. The Astros claimed victory, 8–2. Former Astro Lance Berkman, starting as the Rangers' designated hitter (DH), was recognized during the pre-game ceremony. Texans defensive end J. J. Watt threw the ceremonial first pitch to catcher J. D. Martinez, who promptly obliged Watt by autographing a baseball. Bud Norris was the Astros' choice as the first Opening Day starting pitcher for the AL era, thus delivering the first pitch.

The Astros' first hit as AL team came via Altuve's groundball single in the first inning. Justin Maxwell connected for a two-run batted in (RBI) triple during the bottom fourth to break a scoreless tie. The first pinch-hitting decision arrived in the sixth inning for manager Bo Porter, with runners on first and second and two outs. The actor in Porter's move became Rick Ankiel, substituted for Brandon Barnes, and Ankiel launched Houston's first home run as an AL team, a three-run blast to right field, to give the Astros a lead of 7–2. Maxwell tripled twice, which tied a major league record for Opening Day. The Astros' first victory as an American League club was also the 4,000th in franchise history. Moreover, this win was the first of what evolved into a club-record ten-Opening Day winning streak, through 2022.

==== April ====
On April 2, Marwin González broke up a perfect game bid by Rangers starter Yu Darvish with two outs in the bottom of the ninth inning. Darvish struck out 14 and achieved a game score of 96. Michael Kirkman relieved Darvish and gave up another hit to Jose Altuve. However, the Astros' rally stalled as Kirkman secured the final out and victory for Texas, 7–0. Lucas Harrell (0–1) took the loss in spite of being charged with just one run over six innings pitched.

For the third time in a single game on April 9, the Astros concentrated as many as 40 total bases during a 16–9 route of the Seattle Mariners. (Note: For single games, from 1962 to 2025, for HOU, in the regular season, requiring total bases ≥ 40, sorted by ascending date.) A quartet of Astros went deep for the first time on the season Chris Carter (twice), J. D. Martinez, Marwin González, and Jose Altuve. Seven of nine starters assembled multi-hit efforts as the Astros collected 22 hits, eight going for extra bases. Right-hander Paul Clemens (1–0) earned the victory with four innings of relief though he surrendered five earned runs and three home runs. Carter attained both his first career multi-homer and four-hit games, while for Altuve, it was his third career four-hit game and first with four runs batted in. González reached base five times via three hits and two walks and scored thrice. The 16 runs scored represented a season-high for the team. The 40 total bases ranked, at the time third-most in club history (44 accumulated on September 9, 2000; and 42 one month earlier on August 13, 2000). The Astros' next bout attaining this threshold was on August 10, 2019, when they set a new franchise record with 50.

The Cleveland Indians handed the Astros a 19–6 defeat on April 20 at Minute Maid Park, their highest score surrendered on the season. Astros starter Philip Humber (0–4) recorded just one out while being pasted for eight runs on eight hits. Following Humber, the Indians battered Dallas Keuchel for another seven runs over 2 2/3 innings, striking a 14–0 lead after just two at bats on their way to scoring at least one run in each of the first five innings. Paul Clemens parlayed the lone bright spot for Houston pitching, delivering one-hit ball over the final 3 1/3 frames.

==== May ====
Jason Castro honered twice on May 25, he second career mult-home run game.

Castro attained his first career four-hit game on May 24.

For the week ended May 26, Castro batted .579 / .636 on-base percentage (OBP) / 1.105 slugging percentage (SLG) (11-for-19), 21 total bases, three home runs, five runs batted in (RBI). Hence, Castro was named AL Player of the Week.

On May 27, J. D. Martinez became the second Astro to earn the platinum sombrero, a mythical award for striking out five times in one game. His followed Preston Wilson on April 17, 2006, a nine-inning game. (Note: For single games, playing for HOU, in the regular season, requiring strikeouts ≥ 4, sorted by descending strikeouts.) Martinez' was during a 12-inning victory over the Colorado Rockes, 3–2. Brandon Barnes sliced a ground rule double to deep right field to score Ronny Cedeño during the bottom of the 12th inning for the walk-off victory.

==== June ====
On June 18, Matt Dominguez connected for his first grand slam in the major leagues, off Tom Gorzelanny of the Milwaukee Brewers.

On June 23, Chris Carter attained his second career four-hit game—and second of the campaign—while realizing his first with three doubles. In spite of this performance, Houston fell in defeat to their former National League Central-division rivals Chicago Cubs, 14–6. Jeff Samardzija (5–7) earned the win over Jordan Lyles (4–2) while Ryan Sweeney collected six RBI, and Anthony Rizzo augmented four hits, four RBI, through three hits.

==== Beginning of July ====
Jason Castro was invited to the MLB All-Star Game for the first time, hosted at Citi Field in Queens, New York City. He became Houston's second catcher to garner selection to the All-Star Game, succeeding Craig Biggio in 1991. (Note: For single seasons, Played at least 50% of games at C, Playing for HOU, is an All-Star, in the regular season, sorted by ascending Season..)

==== Brandon Barnes' cycle ====
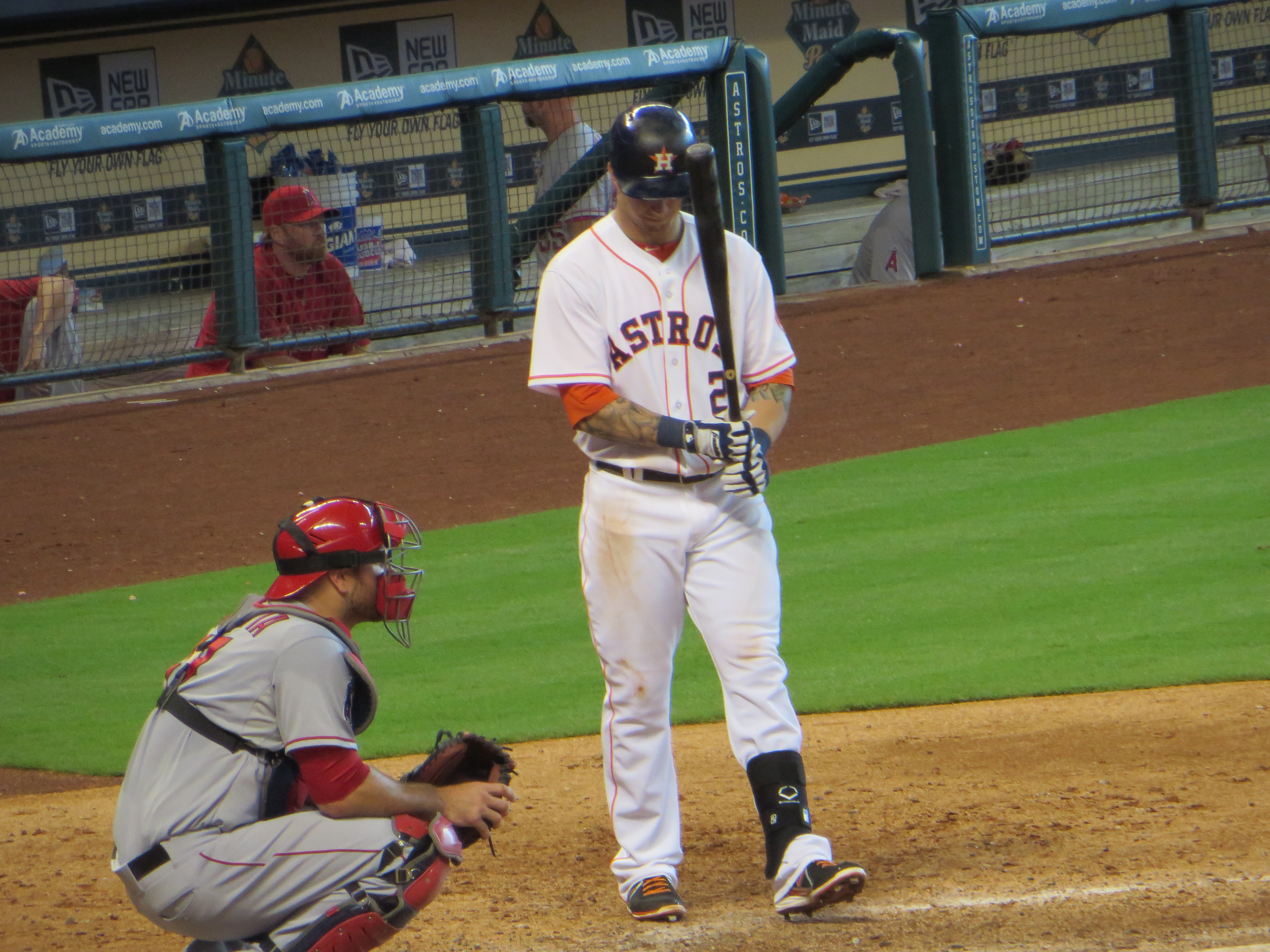
Brandon Barnes at bat.

On July 19, outfielder Brandon Barnes hit for the cycle, the eighth in franchise history, including a 5-for-5 performance, starting with a home run to left field in the second inning during a 10–7 loss to the Seattle Mariners. Barnes followed up the home run with a triple in the fourth, single in the sixth, and double in the eighth. In the ninth, he tapped in an infield single for the fifth hit of the day. Barnes hit the home run and triple off Joe Saunders.

This was the only cycle in club history featured as portion of a five-hit game, (Note: For single games, playing for HOU, in the regular season, requiring singles ≥ 1 and doubles ≥ 1 and triples ≥ 1 and home runs ≥ 1 and hits ≥ 5, sorted by descending date.) and just the third five-hit game in club history also accentuated by 10 or more total bases. (Note: Previously accomplished by Joe Morgan on July 8, 1965, and Lee May on April 29, 1974. For single games, playing for HOU, in the regular season, requiring total bases ≥ 10, hits ≥ 5, sorted by descending date.) The seventh Astro to hit for the cycle, the only player to do so twice was César Cedeño. Barnes' feat was preceded by Luke Scott on July 28, 2006, and Barnes' then-teammate Jose Altuve succeeded him on August 28, 2023.

==== Rest of July ====
Multiple Astros realized first-time achievements on July 31 in Oriole Park at Camden Yards, led by Jason Castro, who connected for his first major league grand slam. He hit it off Miguel González of Baltimore during the top of the fourth inning to cap an 11–0 Astros victory. Castro also doubled twice, and Robbie Grossman (1) and Matt Dominguez (14) added home runs. Brett Oberholtzer tossed seven shutout innings to obtain his first major league victory and a game score of 77. Dominguez produced his first career four-hit game, while Grossman's home run was his first in the major leagues. Castro also started a 12-game hitting streak which was second-highest on the Astros this season, and lasted until August 14. He hit .370. / .455 / .587, four doubles, two home runs, 10 RBI, and 8 BB. (Note: Longest streak of consecutive games, in 2013, playing for HOU, in the regular season, requiring hits ≥ 1, sorted by most games matching criteria.)

==== August ====
From August 13 to 27, rookie Robbie Grossman produced a team season-high 14-game hitting streak. Grossman batted .365 / .369 / .492, 17 hits, 5 doubles, one home run, and 9 RBI.

==== September ====
On September 13, Matt Dominguez became the 11th player in club history to hit two grand slams in one season, also tying a then-team record. He was the first to do so as a member of the Astros since Carlos Lee during the 2009 season. (Note: In 2016, George Springer became the first player in club history to hit three grand slams in a single season.)

On September 28, former Astro Andy Pettitte made his final major league appearance at Minute Maid Park, earning a five-hit complete game victory as the New York Yankees defeated the Astros, 2–1. The Astros scored their lone run during the bottom of the fourth inning when Chris Carter drove home Jose Altuve on a groundout. J. D. Martinez doubled for the only extra-base hit off Pettitte. Pettitte whiffed Brandon Barnes in the eighth for his final major league strikeout. During the bottom of the ninth, Carter singled for the final hit off Pettitte, and Pettitte retired Martinez on a ground out to third base for his final batter of the contest and major league career.

The Astros concluded the 2013 season on a 15-game losing streak, qualifying as the longest-ever in franchise annals.

==== Performance overview ====
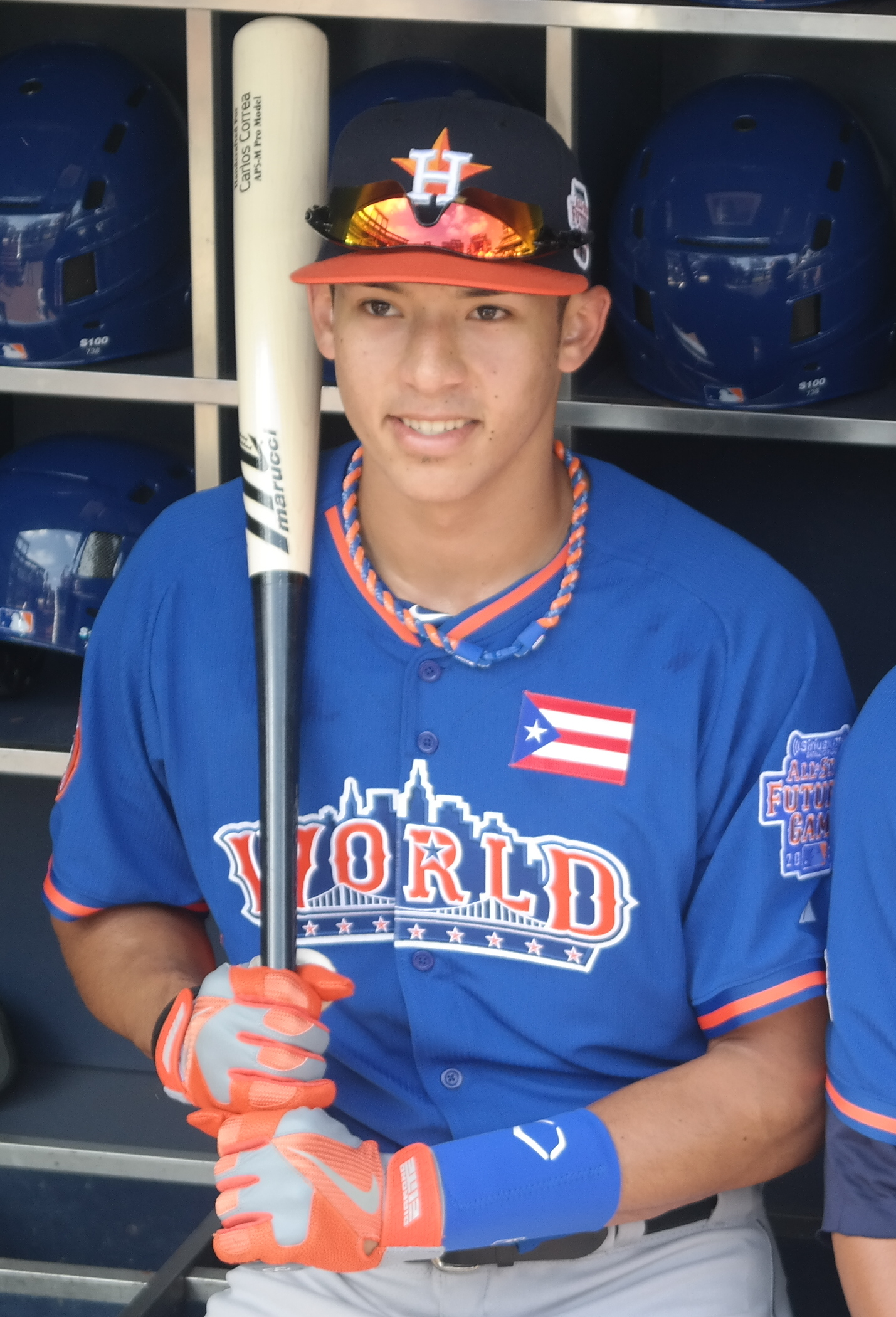
Carlos Correa at the 2013 All-Star Futures Game.

During an up-and-down first season as members of the American League, the Astros' 15-game losing streak, plunging their performance to a club-worst 111 losses. On the season, Houston won just 12 series, two of which were sweeps, and none outside of the AL West. They were swept 18 times, finishing 45 games out of first place, winning just two games against the rival Texas Rangers and four games against the Oakland Athletics, getting shut out 14 times (twice in a row against the Rangers and the Rays). They surrendered 10 runs or more in 17 games.

For the third consecutive year, the Astros set the club record for losses, surpassing the 56–106 record the year prior. They finished 45 games behind the AL West-champion A's. The 45 games behind surpassed another club record set in 1975, when they trailed by 43 1/2 games to that year's National League West division-champion Cincinnati Reds, who claimed an incredible 108–54 (.667) record along with that year's World Series. They became baseball's first team to lose 100 or more contests over three consecutive years since the 2004 to 2006 Kansas City Royals.

However, several young players had breakout seasons. Catcher Jason Castro hit .276 with 18 home runs and 56 RBI in just 120 games. Second baseman Jose Altuve hit .284, 52 RBI, and 35 stolen bases. Third baseman Matt Dominguez ranked second on the club to Chris Carter in home runs (21) and RBI (77) while being recognized for his superlative defense at third base with the Wilson Defensive Player of the Year Award for the Astros.

=== League standings ===
==== American League West ====
AL West
Team	W	L	Pct.	GB	Home	Road
Oakland Athletics	96	66	.593	—	52‍–‍29	44‍–‍37
Texas Rangers	91	72	.558	5½	46‍–‍36	45‍–‍36
Los Angeles Angels	78	84	.481	18	39‍–‍42	39‍–‍42
Seattle Mariners	71	91	.438	25	36‍–‍45	35‍–‍46
Houston Astros	51	111	.315	45	24‍–‍57	27‍–‍54

==== American League Wild Card ====
AL Wild Card standings

Division winners
Team	W	L	Pct.
Boston Red Sox	97	65	.599
Oakland Athletics	96	66	.593
Detroit Tigers	93	69	.574

Wild Card teams (Top 2 teams qualify for postseason)
Team	W	L	Pct.	GB
Cleveland Indians	92	70	.568	+½
Tampa Bay Rays	92	71	.564	—
Texas Rangers	91	72	.558	1
Kansas City Royals	86	76	.531	5½
New York Yankees	85	77	.525	6½
Baltimore Orioles	85	77	.525	6½
Los Angeles Angels	78	84	.481	13½
Toronto Blue Jays	74	88	.457	17½
Seattle Mariners	71	91	.438	20½
Minnesota Twins	66	96	.407	25½
Chicago White Sox	63	99	.389	28½
Houston Astros	51	111	.315	40½

==== Record versus opponents ====
American League

2013 American League record Source: MLB Standings Grid – 2013
Team	BAL	BOS	CWS	CLE	DET	HOU	KC	LAA	MIN	NYY	OAK	SEA	TB	TEX	TOR	NL
Baltimore	—	11–8	4–3	3–4	4–2	4–2	3–4	5–2	3–3	9–10	5–2	2–4	6–13	5–2	10–9	11–9
Boston	8–11	—	4–2	6–1	3–4	6–1	2–5	3–3	4–3	13–6	3–3	6–1	12–7	2–4	11–8	14–6
Chicago	3–4	2–4	—	2–17	7–12	3–4	9–10	3–4	8–11	3–3	2–5	3–3	2–5	4–2	4–3	8–12
Cleveland	4–3	1–6	17–2	—	4–15	6–1	10–9	4–2	13–6	1–6	5–2	5–2	2–4	5–1	4–2	11–9
Detroit	2–4	4–3	12–7	15–4	—	6–1	9–10	0–6	11–8	3–3	3–4	5–2	3–3	3–4	5–2	12–8
Houston	2–4	1–6	4–3	1–6	1–6	—	2–4	10–9	1–5	1–5	4–15	9–10	2–5	2–17	3–4	8–12
Kansas City	4–3	5–2	10–9	9–10	10–9	4–2	—	2–5	15–4	2–5	1–5	4–3	6–1	3–3	2–4	9–11
Los Angeles	2–5	3–3	4–3	2–4	6–0	9–10	5–2	—	1–5	3–4	8–11	11–8	4–3	4–15	6–1	10–10
Minnesota	3–3	3–4	11–8	6–13	8–11	5–1	4–15	5–1	—	2–5	1–6	4–3	1–6	4–3	1–5	8–12
New York	10–9	6–13	3–3	6–1	3–3	5–1	5–2	4–3	5–2	—	1–5	4–3	7–12	3–4	14–5	9–11
Oakland	2–5	3–3	5–2	2–5	4–3	15–4	5–1	11–8	6–1	5–1	—	8–11	3–3	10–9	4–3	13–7
Seattle	4–2	1–6	3–3	2–5	2–5	10–9	3–4	8–11	3–4	3–4	11–8	—	3–3	7–12	3–3	8–12
Tampa Bay	13–6	7–12	5–2	4–2	3–3	5–2	1–6	3–4	6–1	12–7	3–3	3–3	—	4–4	11–8	12–8
Texas	2–5	4–2	2–4	1–5	4–3	17–2	3–3	15–4	3–4	4–3	9–10	12–7	4–4	—	1–6	10–10
Toronto	9–10	8–11	3–4	2–4	2–5	4–3	4–2	1–6	5–1	5–14	3–4	3–3	8–11	6–1	—	11–9

=== Game log ===
Legend
	Astros win
	Astros loss
	Postponement
**Bold**	Astros team member

2013 Game Log: 51-111 (Home: 24-57; Away: 27-54)
March: 1-0 (Home: 1-0; Away: 0-0)

#	Date	Opponent	Score	Win	Loss	Save	Attendance	Stadium	Record	Boxscore / Streak
1	March 31	Rangers	8-2	**Norris** (1-0)	Harrison (0-1)	**Bédard** (1)	41,307	Minute Maid Park	1-0	W1

April: 7-19 (Home: 3-8; Away: 4-11)

#	Date	Opponent	Score	Win	Loss	Save	Attendance	Stadium	Record	Boxscore / Streak
2	April 2	Rangers	0-7	Darvish (1-0)	**Harrell** (0-1)		22,673	Minute Maid Park	1-1	L1
3	April 3	Rangers	0-4	Ogando (1-0)	**Humber** (0-1)		15,831	Minute Maid Park	1-2	L2
4	April 5	Athletics	3-8	Straily (1-0)	**Peacock** (0-1)		18,197	Minute Maid Park	1-3	L3
5	April 6	Athletics	3-6	Colón (1-0)	**Norris** (1-1)	Balfour (1)	18,685	Minute Maid Park	1-4	L4
6	April 7	Athletics	3-9	Anderson (1-1)	**Harrell** (0-2)		16,914	Minute Maid Park	1-5	L5
7	April 8	@ Mariners	0-3	Saunders (1-1)	**Humber** (0-2)	Wilhelmsen (3)	42,589	Safeco Field	1-6	L6
8	April 9	@ Mariners	16-9	**Clemens** (1-0)	Maurer (0-2)		10,745	Safeco Field	2-6	W1
9	April 10	@ Mariners	8-3	**Peacock** (1-1)	Beavan (0-1)		10,493	Safeco Field	3-6	W2
10	April 12	@ Angels	5-0	**Norris** (2-1)	Hanson (1-1)		37,674	Angel Stadium of Anaheim	4-6	W3
11	April 13	@ Angels	4-5	Roth (1-0)	**Veras** (0-1)		43,520	Angel Stadium of Anaheim	4-7	L1
12	April 14	@ Angels	1-4	Wilson (1-0)	**Humber** (0-3)	Frieri (2)	36,126	Angel Stadium of Anaheim	4-8	L2
13	April 15	@ Athletics	2-11	Milone (3-0)	**Bédard** (0-1)		10,689	O.co Coliseum	4-9	L3
14	April 16	@ Athletics	3-4	Doolittle (1-0)	**Cruz** (0-1)	Balfour (2)	11,038	O.co Coliseum	4-10	L4
15	April 17	@ Athletics	5-7	Colón (2-0)	**Norris** (2-2)	Balfour (3)	15,488	O.co Coliseum	4-11	L5
16	April 19	Indians	3-2	**Harrell** (1-2)	Myers (0-3)	**Veras** (1)	17,241	Minute Maid Park	5-11	W1
17	April 20	Indians	6-19	Kluber (1-0)	**Humber** (0-4)		19,904	Minute Maid Park	5-12	L1
18	April 21	Indians	4-5	Allen (1-0)	**Ambriz** (0-1)	Perez (2)	22,005	Minute Maid Park	5-13	L2
19	April 22	Mariners	1-7	Hernández (2-2)	**Peacock** (1-2)		23,201	Minute Maid Park	5-14	L3
20	April 23	Mariners	3-2	**Norris** (3-2)	Iwakuma (2-1)	**Veras** (2)	13,929	Minute Maid Park	6-14	W1
21	April 24	Mariners	10-3	**Harrell** (2-2)	Saunders (1-3)		11,686	Minute Maid Park	7-14	W2
22	April 25	@ Red Sox	2-7	Buchholz (5-0)	**Humber** (0-5)		30,093	Fenway Park	7-15	L1
23	April 26	@ Red Sox	3-7	Dempster (1-2)	**Bédard** (0-2)		29,312	Fenway Park	7-16	L2
24	April 27	@ Red Sox	4-8	Doubront (3-0)	**Peacock** (1-3)		34,726	Fenway Park	7-17	L3
25	April 28	@ Red Sox	1-6	Lackey (1-1)	**Norris** (3-3)		36,527	Fenway Park	7-18	L4
26	April 29	@ Yankees	9-1	**Harrell** (3-2)	Pettitte (3-2)		34,262	Yankee Stadium	8-18	W1
27	April 30	@ Yankees	4-7	Kuroda (4-1)	**Humber** (0-6)	Rivera (10)	34,301	Yankee Stadium	8-19	L1

May: 10-18 (Home: 5-13; Away: 5-5)

#	Date	Opponent	Score	Win	Loss	Save	Attendance	Stadium	Record	Boxscore / Streak
28	May 1	@ Yankees	4-5	Logan (2-1)	**Clemens** (1-1)	Rivera (11)	34,117	Yankee Stadium	8-20	L2
29	May 2	Tigers	3-7	Putkonen (1-0)	**Keuchel** (0-1)		16,624	Minute Maid Park	8-21	L3
30	May 3	Tigers	3-4	Smyly (2-0)	**Veras** (0-2)	Valverde (3)	16,719	Minute Maid Park	8-22	L4
31	May 4	Tigers	2-17	Scherzer (4-0)	**Harrell** (3-3)		21,266	Minute Maid Park	8-23	L5
32	May 5	Tigers	0-9	Verlander (4-2)	**Humber** (0-7)		23,228	Minute Maid Park	8-24	L6
33	May 7	Angels	7-6	**Lyles** (1-0)	Wilson (3-1)	**Veras** (3)	15,266	Minute Maid Park	9-24	W1
34	May 8	Angels	3-1	**Norris** (4-3)	Blanton (0-6)	**Veras** (4)	12,906	Minute Maid Park	10-24	W2
35	May 9	Angels	5-6	Richards (2-3)	**Ambriz** (0-2)	Frieri (5)	13,003	Minute Maid Park	10-25	L1
36	May 10	Rangers	2-4	Ross (1-0)	**Wright** (0-1)	Nathan (10)	20,293	Minute Maid Park	10-26	L2
37	May 11	Rangers	7-8	Darvish (6-1)	**Humber** (0-8)	Nathan (11)	27,188	Minute Maid Park	10-27	L3
38	May 12	Rangers	7-12	Tepesch (3-3)	**Lyles** (1-1)		19,730	Minute Maid Park	10-28	L4
39	May 13	@ Tigers	2-7	Sánchez (4-3)	**Norris** (4-4)		31,161	Comerica Park	10-29	L5
40	May 14	@ Tigers	2-6	Fister (5-1)	**Harrell** (3-4)		34,542	Comerica Park	10-30	L6
41	May 15	@ Tigers	7-5	**Ambriz** (1-2)	Albuquerque (0-1)	**Veras** (5)	40,315	Comerica Park	11-30	W1
42	May 17	@ Pirates	4-5	Wilson (4-0)	**González** (0-1)		29,743	PNC Park	11-31	L1
43	May 18	@ Pirates	4-2 (11)	**Cisnero** (1-0)	Bryan Morris (1-2)	**Veras** (6)	32,925	PNC Park	12-31	W1
44	May 19	@ Pirates	0-1	Locke (4-1)	**Harrell** (3-5)	Grilli (17)	28,471	PNC Park	12-32	L1
45	May 20	Royals	6-5	**Keuchel** (1-1)	Guthrie (5-2)	**Veras** (7)	12,989	Minute Maid Park	13-32	W1
46	May 21	Royals	3-7	Chen (3-0)	**Clemens** (1-2)		12,302	Minute Maid Park	13-33	L1
47	May 22	Royals	3-1	**Lyles** (2-1)	Shields (2-5)	**Veras** (8)	12,324	Minute Maid Park	14-33	W1
48	May 24	Athletics	5-6	Neshek (1-0)	**Veras** (0-3)	Balfour (10)	15,907	Minute Maid Park	14-34	L1
49	May 25	Athletics	5-11	Griffin (5-3)	**Harrell** (3-6)		18,591	Minute Maid Park	14-35	L2
50	May 26	Athletics	2-6	Colón (5-2)	**Keuchel** (1-2)		19,366	Minute Maid Park	14-36	L3
51	May 27	Rockies	3-2 (12)	**Clemens** (2-2)	López (1-2)		16,044	Minute Maid Park	15-36	W1
52	May 28	Rockies	1-2	Belisle (2-2)	**Veras** (0-4)	Betancourt (11)	11,974	Minute Maid Park	15-37	L1
53	May 29	@ Rockies	6-3	**Clemens** (3-2)	Escalona (1-2)		26,881	Coors Field	16-37	W1
54	May 30	@ Rockies	7-5	**Harrell** (4-6)	Nicasio (4-2)	**Ambriz** (1)	26,239	Coors Field	17-37	W2
55	May 31	@ Angels	6-3	**Keuchel** (2-2)	Hanson (2-2)	**Veras** (9)	34,401	Angel Stadium of Anaheim	18-37	W3

June: 12-15 (Home: 7-7; Away: 5-8)

#	Date	Opponent	Score	Win	Loss	Save	Attendance	Stadium	Record	Boxscore / Streak
56	June 1	@ Angels	2-0	**Norris** (5-4)	Williams (4-2)	**Veras** (10)	40,087	Angel Stadium of Anaheim	19-37	W4
57	June 2	@ Angels	5-4	**Lyles** (3-1)	Wilson (4-4)	**Ambriz** (2)	35,515	Angel Stadium of Anaheim	20-37	W5
58	June 3	@ Angels	2-1	**Bédard** (1-2)	**Blanton** (1-9)	**Veras** (11)	30,010	Angel Stadium of Anaheim	21-37	W6
59	June 4	Orioles	1-4	Tillman (5-2)	**Harrell** (4-7)	Johnson (19)	15,920	Minute Maid Park	21-38	L1
60	June 5	Orioles	11-7	**Keuchel** (3-2)	García (2-3)		15,526	Minute Maid Park	22-38	W1
61	June 6	Orioles	1-3	González (3-2)	**Norris** (5-5)	Johnson (20)	14,664	Minute Maid Park	22-39	L1
62	June 7	@ Royals	2-4	Herrera (3-4)	**Wright** (0-2)	Holland (11)	24,808	Kauffman Stadium	22-40	L2
63	June 8	@ Royals	2-7	Santana (4-5)	**Bédard** (1-3)		28,055	Kauffman Stadium	22-41	L3
64	June 9	@ Royals	0-2	Crow (2-1)	**Ambriz** (1-3)	Holland (12)	20,723	Kauffman Stadium	22-42	L4
65	June 10	@ Mariners	2-3	Iwakuma (7-1)	**Keuchel** (3-3)	Wilhelmsen (16)	12,811	Safeco Field	22-43	L5
66	June 11	@ Mariners	0-4	Harang (3-6)	**Norris** (5-6)		10,266	Safeco Field	22-44	L6
67	June 12	@ Mariners	6-1	**Clemens** (4-2)	Wilehlmsen (0-2)		13,823	Safeco Field	23-44	W1
68	June 14	White Sox	2-1	**Bédard** (2-3)	Sale (5-5)	**Veras** (12)	20,496	Minute Maid Park	24-44	W2
69	June 15	White Sox	4-3	**Harrell** (5-7)	Danks (1-3)	**Veras** (13)	21,549	Minute Maid Park	25-44	W3
70	June 16	White Sox	5-4	**Keuchel** (4-3)	Santiago (2-5)	**Veras** (14)	25,829	Minute Maid Park	26-44	W4
71	June 17	White Sox	2-4	Jones (3-4)	**Norris** (5-7)	Reed (20)	13,870	Minute Maid Park	26-45	L1
72	June 18	Brewers	10-1	**Lyles** (4-1)	Figaro (1-1)		13,330	Minute Maid Park	27-45	W1
73	June 19	Brewers	1-3	Axford (3-3)	**Ambriz** (1-4)	Rodriguez (5)	15,866	Minute Maid Park	27-46	L1
74	June 20	Brewers	7-4 (10)	**Ambriz** (2-4)	Gonzalez (0-3)		17,803	Minute Maid Park	28-46	W1
75	June 21	@ Cubs	1-3	Garza (2-1)	**Keuchel** (4-4)	Gregg (11)	33,119	Wrigley Field	28-47	L1
76	June 22	@ Cubs	4-3	**Cisnero** (2-0)	Gregg (2-1)	**Veras** (15)	38,870	Wrigley Field	29-47	W1
77	June 23	@ Cubs	6-14	Samardzija (5-7)	**Lyles** (4-2)		35,121	Wrigley Field	29-48	L1
78	June 25	Cardinals	5-13	Westbrook (4-2)	**Harrell** (5-8)		19,271	Minute Maid Park	29-49	L2
79	June 26	Cardinals	4-3	**Bédard** (3-3)	Lynn (10-2)	**Veras** (16)	17,428	Minute Maid Park	30-49	W1
80	June 28	Angels	2-4	De La Rosa (3-1)	**Clemens**	Frieri (20)	20,498	Minute Maid Park	30-50	L1
81	June 29	Angels	2-7	Blanton	**Lyles** (4-3)		26,650	Minute Maid Park	30-51	L2
82	June 30	Angels	1-3	Wilson (8-5)	**Cisnero** (2-1)	Ernesto Frieri (21)	22,361	Minute Maid Park	30-52	L3

July: 6-18 (Home: 2-8; 4-10)

#	Date	Opponent	Score	Win	Loss	Save	Attendance	Stadium	Record	Boxscore / Streak
83	July 1	Rays	0-12	Moore (11-3)	**Keuchel** (4-5)		12,722	Minute Maid Park	30-53	L4
84	July 2	Rays	0-8	Price (2-4)	**Bédard** (3-4)		19,631	Minute Maid Park	30-54	L5
85	July 3	Rays	4-1	**Norris** (6-7)	Hernández (4-10)	**Veras** (17)	14,143	Minute Maid Park	31-54	W1
86	July 4	Rays	5-7 (11)	Wright (2-1)	**Fields** (0-1)	Rodney (18)	20,470	Minute Maid Park	31-55	L1
87	July 5	@ Rangers	5-10	Tepesch (4-6)	**Harrell** (5-9)		44,232	Rangers Ballpark in Arlington	31-56	L2
88	July 6	@ Rangers	9-5	**Blackley** (1-0)	Darvish (8-4)		44,272	Rangers Ballpark in Arlington	32-56	W1
89	July 7	@ Rangers	4-5	Burns (1-0)	**Bédard** (3-5)	Nathan (29)	36,746	Rangers Ballpark in Arlington	32-57	L1
90	July 9	@ Cardinals	5-9	Wainwright (12-5)	**Norris** (6-8)	Mujica (24)	43,836	Busch Stadium	32-58	L2
91	July 10	@ Cardinals	4-5	Maness (5-1)	**Wright** (0-3)	Mujica (25)	44,313	Busch Stadium	32-59	L3
92	July 12	@ Rays	2-1	**Cosart** (1-0)	Price (3-5)	**Veras** (18)	13,347	Tropicana Field	33-59	W1
93	July 13	@ Rays	3-4	Hernández (5-10)	**Harrell** (5-10)	Rodney (22)	20,409	Tropicana Field	33-60	L1
94	July 14	@ Rays	0-5	Archer (4-3)	**Bédard** (3-6)		21,180	Tropicana Field	33-61	L2
95	July 19	Mariners	7-10	Saunders (9-8)	**Norris** (6-9)	Wilhelmsen (20)	24,635	Minute Maid Park	33-62	L3
96	July 20	Mariners	2-4	Iwakuma (9-4)	**Bédard** (3-7)	Wilhelmsen (21)	25,733	Minute Maid Park	33-63	L4
97	July 21	Mariners	5-12	Hernández (11-4)	**Lyles** (4-4)		38,838	Minute Maid Park	33-64	L5
98	July 22	Athletics	3-4	Cook (3-2)	**Wright** (0-4)	Balfour (26)	16,381	Minute Maid Park	33-65	L6
99	July 23	Athletics	5-4	**Fields** (1-1)	Balfour (0-2)		32,249	Minute Maid Park	34-65	W1
100	July 24	Athletics	3-4	Griffin (9-7)	**Blackley** (1-1)	Cook (2)	24,831	Minute Maid Park	34-66	L1
101	July 25	@ Blue Jays	0-4	Buehrle (6-7)	**Bédard** (3-8)		24,188	Rogers Centre	34-67	L2
102	July 26	@ Blue Jays	6-12	Cecil (4-1)	**Clemens** (4-4)		24,088	Rogers Centre	34-68	L3
103	July 27	@ Blue Jays	8-6	**Keuchel** (5-5)	Johnson (1-7)	**Veras** (19)	34,317	Rogers Centre	35-68	W1
104	July 28	@ Blue Jays	1-2	Janssen (3-0)	**Cisnero** (2-2)		31,634	Rogers Centre	35-69	L1
105	July 30	@ Orioles	3-4	Wei-Yin Chen (6-3)	**Harrell** (5-11)	Jim Johnson (36)	24,904	Oriole Park at Camden Yards	35-70	L2
106	July 31	@ Orioles	11–0	**Oberholtzer** (1–0)	González (8–5)		25,265	Oriole Park at Camden Yards	36-70	W1

August: 8-21 (Home: 3-10; Away: 5-11)

#	Date	Opponent	Score	Win	Loss	Save	Attendance	Stadium	Record	Boxscore / Streak
107	August 1	@ Orioles	3-6	Norris (6-9)	**Lyles** (4-5)	Johnson (37)	17,909	Oriole Park at Camden Yards	36-71	L1
108	August 2	@ Twins	3-4(13)	Pressly (3-2)	**Keuchel** (5-6)		30,633	Target Field	36-72	L2
109	August 3	@ Twins	4-6	Duensing (4-1)	**Harrell** (5-12)	Perkins (26)	38,078	Target Field	36-73	L3
110	August 4	@ Twins	2-3	Thielbar (2-1)	**Peacock** (1-4)	Perkins (27)	34,780	Target Field	36-74	L4
111	August 5	Red Sox	2-0	**Oberholtzer** (2-0)	Lackey (7-9)	**Fields** (1)	24,453	Minute Maid Park	37-74	W1
112	August 6	Red Sox	10-15	Workman (2-1)	**Lyles** (4-6)		21,620	Minute Maid Park	37-75	L1
113	August 7	Red Sox	5-7	Tazawa (5-3)	**Fields** (1-2)	Uehara (11)	22,205	Minute Maid Park	37-76	L2
114	August 9	Rangers	5-9	Garza (8-2)	**Zeid** (0-1)	Cotts (1)	23,673	Minute Maid Park	37-77	L3
115	August 10	Rangers	4-5	Frasor (3-2)	**Harrell** (5-13)	Nathan (34)	33,322	Minute Maid Park	37-78	L4
116	August 11	Rangers	1-6	Perez (5-3)	Keuchel (5-7)		22,922	Minute Maid Park	37-79	L5
117	August 12	Rangers	1-2	Darvish (12-5)	**Oberholtzer** (2-1)	Nathan (35)	18,712	Minute Maid Park	37-80	L6
118	August 13	@ Athletics	5-4	**Lyles** (5-6)	Colón (14-5)	**Lo** (1)	14,261	O.co Coliseum	38-80	W1
119	August 14	@ Athletics	2-1 (11)	**Harrell** (6-13)	Doolittle (3-4)	**Fields** (2)	18,278	O.co Coliseum	39-80	W2
120	August 15	@ Athletics	0-5	Gray (1-1)	**Bédard** (3-9)		16,487	O.co Coliseum	39-81	L1
121	August 16	@ Angels	8-2	**Peacock** (2-4)	Williams (5-9)		39,074	Angel Stadium of Anaheim	40-81	W1
122	August 17	@ Angels	5-6 (10)	Frieri (1-4)	**Fields** (1-3)		40,246	Angel Stadium of Anaheim	40-82	L1
123	August 18	@ Angels	7-5	**Oberholtzer** (3-1)	Gutierrez (0-4)	**Chapman** (1)	36,896	Angel Stadium of Anaheim	41-82	W1
124	August 19	@ Rangers	5-16	Garza (9-2)	**Harrell** (6-14)		32,113	Rangers Ballpark in Arlington	41-83	L1
125	August 20	@ Rangers	2-4	Cotts (5-2)	**Cosart** (1-1)	Nathan (37)	39,009	Rangers Ballpark in Arlington	41-84	L2
126	August 21	@ Rangers	4-5	Nathan (4-2)	**Lo** (0-1)		38,699	Rangers Ballpark in Arlington	41-85	L3
127	August 23	Blue Jays	12-4	**Lyles** (6-6)	Redmond (1-2)		21,186	Minute Maid Park	42-85	W1
128	August 24	Blue Jays	8-5	**Peacock** (3-4)	Wang (1-2)	**Lo** (2)	26,312	Minute Maid Park	43-85	W2
129	August 25	Blue Jays	1-2	Buehrle (10-7)	**Lo** (0-2)	Janssen (23)	21,407	Minute Maid Park	43-86	L1
130	August 26	@ White Sox	10-8	**Martínez** (1-0)	Reed (5-2)	**Lyles** (1)	13,404	U.S. Cellular Field	44-86	W1
131	August 27	@ White Sox	3-4	Veal (2-3)	**Bédard** (3-10)	Reed (36)	15,491	U.S. Cellular Field	44-87	L1
132	August 28	@ White Sox	1-6	Sale (10-12)	**Harrell** (6-15)		15,961	U.S. Cellular Field	44-88	L2
133	August 29	Mariners	2-3	Ramirez (5-1)	**Lyles** (6-7)	Farquhar (10)	22,203	Minute Maid Park	44-89	L3
134	August 30	Mariners	1-7	Walker (1-0)	**Peacock** (3-5)		13,869	Minute Maid Park	44-90	L4
135	August 31	Mariners	1-3	Saunders (11-13)	**Keuchel** (5-8)	Farquhar (11)	21,085	Minute Maid Park	44-91	L5

September: 7-20 (Home: 3-10: Away: 4-10)

#	Date	Opponent	Score	Win	Loss	Save	Attendance	Stadium	Record	Boxscore / Streak
136	September 1	Mariners	2-0	**Oberholtzer** (4-1)	Furbush (2-5)		17,203	Minute Maid Park	45-91	W1
137	September 2	Twins	6-10	Roenicke (3-1)	**Lo** (0-3)		14,287	Minute Maid Park	45-92	L1
138	September 3	Twins	6-9	Thielbar (3-1)	**Chapman** (0-1)	Roenicke (1)	13,500	Minute Maid Park	45-93	L2
139	September 4	Twins	6-5	**Bédard** (4-10)	Duensing (6-2)		14,869	Minute Maid Park	46-93	W1
140	September 5	@ Athletics	3-2	**Peacock** (4-5)	Gray (2-3)	**Fields** (3)	11,569	O.co Coliseum	47-93	W2
141	September 6	@ Athletics	5-7	Griffin (13-9)	**Keuchel** (5-9)	Balfour (37)	15,502	O.co Coliseum	47-94	L1
142	September 7	@ Athletics	1-2	Straily (9-7)	**Oberholtzer** (4-2)	Doolittle (1)	17,310	O.co Coliseum	47-95	L2
143	September 8	@ Athletics	2-7	Colón (15-6)	**Harrell** (6-16)	Anderson (3)	18,824	O.co Coliseum	47-96	L3
144	September 9	@ Mariners	6-4	**Chapman** (1-1)	Farquhar (0-3)	**Fields** (4)	9,808	Safeco Field	48-96	W1
145	September 10	@ Mariners	13-2	**Lyles** (7-7)	Saunders (11-14)		10,245	Safeco Field	49-96	W2
146	September 11	@ Mariners	6-1	**Peacock** (5-5)	Maurer (4-8)	**Zeid** (1)	11,656	Safeco Field	50-96	W3
147	September 13	Angels	9-7	**Keuchel** (6-9)	Vargas	**Fields** (5)	19,742	Minute Maid Park	51-96	W4
148	September 14	Angels	2-6	Weaver (10-8)	**Oberholtzer** (4-3)		21,903	Minute Maid Park	51-97	L1
149	September 15	Angels	1-2	Williams (8-10)	**Clemens** (4-5)	Frieri (34)	21,374	Minute Maid Park	51-98	L2
150	September 16	Reds	1-6	Cueto (5-2)	**Bédard** (4-11)		15,449	Minute Maid Park	51-99	L3
151	September 17	Reds	0-10	Leake (14-6)	**Lyles** (7-8)		25,582	Minute Maid Park	51-100	L4
152	September 18	Reds	5-6 (13)	Simón (6-4)	**De León** (0-1)	Chapman (37)	29,701	Minute Maid Park	51-101	L5
153	September 19	@ Indians	1-2	Shaw (5-3)	**Cruz** (0-2)		12,607	Progressive Field	51-102	L6
154	September 20	@ Indians	1-2 (7)	McAllister (9-9)	**Oberholtzer (4-4)**	Shaw (1)	17,310	Progressive Field	51-103	L7
155	September 21	@ Indians	1-4	Kazmir (9-9)	**Clemens** (4-6)		26,611	Progressive Field	51-104	L8
156	September 22	@ Indians	2-9	Kluber (10-5)	**Bédard** (4-12)		26,168	Progressive Field	51-105	L9
157	September 23	@ Rangers	0-12	Holland (10-9)	**Lyles** (7-9)		33,743	Rangers Ballpark in Arlington	51-106	L10
158	September 24	@ Rangers	2-3	Cotts (6-3)	**Peacock** (5-6)	Nathan (41)	42,267	Rangers Ballpark in Arlington	51-107	L11
159	September 25	@ Rangers	3-7	Pérez (10-5)	**Keuchel** (6-10)		43,207	Rangers Ballpark in Arlington	51-108	L12
160	September 27	Yankees	2-3	Warren (3-2)	**Oberholtzer** (4-5)	Robertson (3)	29,486	Minute Maid Park	51-109	L13
161	September 28	Yankees	1-2	Pettitte (11-11)	**Clemens** (4-7)		37,199	Minute Maid Park	51-110	L14
162	September 29	Yankees	1-5 (14)	Daley (1-0)	**Harrell** (6-17)		40,542	Minute Maid Park	51-111	L15

=== Roster ===
2013 Houston Astros
**Roster**
**Pitchers**: 62 Héctor Ambriz; 45 Érik Bédard; 54 Travis Blackley; 63 Xavier Cedeño; 66 Kevin Chapman; 68 José Cisnero; 56 Paul Clemens; 48 Jarred Cosart; 55 Rhiner Cruz; 67 Jorge de León; 50 Josh Fields; 31 Édgar González; 64 Lucas Harrell; 21,59 Philip Humber; 60 Dallas Keuchel; 46 Wade LeBlanc; 63 Chia-Jen Lo; 18 Jordan Lyles; 54 David Martínez; 20 Bud Norris; 65 Brett Oberholtzer; 43 Brad Peacock; 41 José Veras; 53 Wesley Wright; 61 Josh Zeid	**Catchers**: 15 Jason Castro; 39 Cody Clark; 22 Carlos Corporán; 44 Matt Pagnozzi; 41 Max Stassi; **Infielders**: 27 Jose Altuve; 23 Chris Carter; 13 Ronny Cedeño; 30 Matt Dominguez; 10 Jake Elmore; 9 Marwin González; 4 Brandon Laird; 12 Carlos Peña; 6 Jonathan Villar; 29 Brett Wallace	**Outfielders**: 28 Rick Ankiel; 2 Brandon Barnes; 8 Trevor Crowe; 19 Robbie Grossman; 28 L. J. Hoes; 59 Marc Krauss; 21 Fernando Martínez; 14 J. D. Martinez; 44 Justin Maxwell; 38 Jimmy Paredes	**Manager**: 16 Bo Porter; **Coaches**: 85 Javier Bracamonte (bullpen catcher); 26 Doug Brocail (pitching); 35 Dave Clark (first base); 11 John Mallee (hitting); 37 Dennis Martínez (bullpen); 58 Jeff Murphy (bullpen catcher); 3 Eduardo Pérez (bench); 51 Dan Radison (assistant hitting); 47 Dave Trembley (third base)

== Player statistics ==
Table legend
League leader (Bold: MLB leader)	Team leader	*	Left-handed batter or pitcher
League top ten	Leader in appearances at position	#	Switch hitter

=== Batting ===
Legend
GP	Games played	AB	At Bats	R	Runs
H	Hits	HR	Home runs	RBI	Runs batted in
BB	Base on balls (walks)	SB	Stolen bases	AVG.	Batting average
OBP.	On-base %	SLG.	Slugging %	OPS	On-base plus slugging

Individual batting results
⌖	Player	G	AB	R	H	HR	RBI	SB	BB	AVG	OBP	SLG	OPS
C	Jason Castro* (Note: Rate statistics qualifiers based on hitless at bats and plate appearances without having reached base added to accumulated total)	120	435	63	120	18	56	2	50	.276	.350	.485	.835
1B	Chris Carter	148	506	64	113	29	82	2	70	.223	.320	.451	.770
2B	Jose Altuve	152	626	64	177	5	52	35	32	.283	.316	.363	.678
3B	Matt Dominguez	152	543	56	131	21	77	0	30	.241	.286	.403	.690
SS	Jonathan Villar^{#}	58	210	26	51	1	8	18	24	.243	.321	.319	.640
LF	JD Martinez	86	296	24	74	7	36	2	10	.250	.272	.378	.650
CF	Brandon Barnes	136	408	46	98	8	41	11	21	.240	.289	.346	.635
RF	LJ Hoes	46	167	24	48	1	10	7	12	.287	.337	.371	.708
DH	Carlos Peña*	85	277	38	58	8	25	1	43	.209	.324	.350	.674
OF	Robbie Grossman^{#}	63	257	29	69	4	21	6	23	.268	.332	.370	.702
1B	Brett Wallace*	79	262	35	58	13	36	1	18	.221	.284	.431	.716
SS	Marwin González^{#}	72	204	22	45	4	14	6	9	.221	.252	.319	.571
C	Carlos Corporán^{#}	64	191	16	43	7	20	0	10	.225	.287	.361	.648
OF	Trevor Crowe^{#}	60	165	18	36	1	13	6	16	.218	.287	.291	.578
SS	Ronny Cedeño	51	141	12	31	1	12	2	6	.220	.260	.298	.558
OF	Justin Maxwell	40	137	21	33	2	8	4	12	.241	.311	.387	.698
OF	Marc Krauss*	52	134	11	28	4	13	2	10	.209	.267	.366	.633
MI	Jake Elmore	52	120	16	29	2	6	1	13	.242	.313	.325	.638
RF	Jimmy Paredes^{#}	48	125	8	24	1	10	4	6	.192	.231	.248	.479
CI	Brandon Laird	25	71	7	12	5	11	0	3	.169	.224	.423	.646
RF	Rick Ankiel*	25	62	6	12	5	11	0	3	.194	.231	.484	.715
C	Cody Clark	16	38	1	4	0	0	0	1	.105	.128	.132	.260
OF	Fernando Martínez*	11	33	1	6	1	3	0	1	.182	.229	.273	.501
C	Matt Pagnozzi	9	21	1	3	0	0	0	1	.143	.182	.143	.325
DH	Max Stassi	3	7	0	2	0	1	0	0	.286	.375	.286	.661
Pitcher Totals			21	1	2	0	0	2	0	.095	.174	.095	.269
**Team totals**		**162**	**5457**	**610**	**1307**	**148**	**566**	**110**	**426**	**.240**	**.299**	**.375**	**.674**

=== Pitching ===
Statistics legend
⌖	Pitching role	ERA	Earned run average	GF	Games finished	IP	Innings pitched	ER	Earned runs allowed	WHIP	Walks plus hits per inning pitched
W	Wins	G	Games pitched	SV	Saves	H	Hits allowed	BB	Base on balls	K/BB	Strikeout-to-walk ratio
L	Losses	GS	Games started	HD	Holds	R	Runs allowed	SO	Strikeouts

Individual pitching results
Player	W	L	ERA	G	GS	SV	IP	H	R	ER	HR	BB	SO
Dallas Keuchel*	6	10	5.15	31	22	0	153.2	184	96	88	20	52	123
Lucas Harrell	6	17	5.86	36	22	0	153.2	174	111	100	20	**88**	89
Érik Bédard*	4	12	4.59	32	26	1	151.0	149	83	77	18	75	138
Jordan Lyles	7	9	5.59	27	25	1	141.2	165	98	88	17	49	93
Bud Norris	6	9	3.93	21	21	0	126.0	135	62	55	11	43	90
Brad Peacock	5	6	5.18	18	14	0	83.1	78	51	48	15	37	77
José Veras	0	4	2.93	42	0	19	43.0	29	15	14	4	14	44
Wesley Wright*	0	4	3.92	54	0	0	41.1	45	20	18	5	16	40
Josh Fields	1	3	4.97	41	0	5	38.0	31	21	21	8	18	40
Héctor Ambriz	2	4	5.70	43	0	2	36.1	50	28	23	8	14	27
Travis Blackley*	1	1	4.89	42	0	0	35.0	30	19	19	10	20	29
Paul Clemens	4	7	5.40	35	5	0	73.1	82	48	44	16	26	49
Brett Oberholtzer*	4	5	2.76	13	10	0	71.2	66	26	22	7	13	45
Jarred Cosart	1	1	1.95	10	10	0	60.0	46	15	13	3	35	33
Philip Humber	0	8	7.90	17	7	0	54.2	75	48	48	9	20	36
José Cisnero	2	2	4.12	28	0	0	43.2	49	23	20	5	22	41
Josh Zeid	0	1	3.90	25	0	1	27.2	26	12	12	3	12	24
Rhiner Cruz	0	2	3.38	20	0	0	21.1	25	9	8	2	11	10
Kevin Chapman^	1	1	1.77	25	0	1	20.1	13	6	4	1	13	15
Chia-Jen Lo	0	3	4.19	19	0	2	19.1	14	9	9	2	13	16
David Martínez	1	0	7.15	4	0	0	11.1	16	11	9	1	3	6
Jorge de León	0	1	5.40	11	0	0	10.0	12	7	6	1	7	6
Édgar González	0	1	7.20	5	0	0	10.0	17	9	8	4	3	8
Wade LeBlanc*	0	0	7.11	4	0	0	6.1	9	10	5	1	5	2
Xavier Cedeño*	0	0	11.37	5	0	0	6.1	10	11	8	0	7	3
Jake Elmore	0	0	0.00	1	0	0	1.0	0	0	0	0	0	0
**Team totals**	**51**	**111**	**4.79**	**162**	**162**	**32**	**1440.0**	**1530**	**848**	**766**	**191**	**616**	**1084**
Other: Complete games—Oberholtzer (2) • Shutouts—Oberholtzer (1) • 50 IP minimum team qualifier. (Note: No pitcher on this team qualified for league leaders in rate statistics.) • Sources:

== Television coverage ==
Astros games were televised on the Comcast SportsNet Houston network in 2013. The network broadcasts to about 40% of the households in the Houston area. Writer J. J. Cooper said that a game in September received a 0.0 rating, as "the Nielsen company could not statistically prove that anyone in the Houston market actually watched the game."

== Major League Baseball draft ==
Houston Astros 2013 MLB draft selections
Rd.	Slot	Draftee	Position	School	Origin	Signed	Notes	Bio
1	1	Mark Appel	Right-handed pitcher	Stanford	(Texas)	Y	(Note: MLB debut on June 29, 2022, with the Philadelphia Phillies)	
2	40	Andrew Thurman	Right-handed pitcher	UC Irvine	(California)	Y		
3	74	Kent Emanuel	Left-handed pitcher	North Carolina • 2013	(Georgia (U.S. state))	Y	(Note: MLB debut on April 24, 2021, with Houston)	
4	107	Conrad Gregor	First baseman	Vanderbilt • 2013	(Indiana)	Y		
5	137	Tony Kemp	Second baseman	Vanderbilt • 2013	(Tennessee)	Y	(Note: MLB debut on May 17, 2016, with Houston)	
6	167	Jacob Nottingham	Catcher	Redlands High	(California)	Y	(Note: MLB debut on April 16, 2018, with the Milwaukee Brewers)	
7	197	James Ramsay	Center fielder	South Florida	(Florida)	Y		
8	227	Jason Martin	Center fielder	Orange Lutheran HS	(California)	Y	(Note: MLB debut on April 6, 2019, with the Pittsburgh Pirates)	

== Awards and achievements ==
=== Offensive achievements ===
==== Grand slams ====
No.	Date	Astros batter	Venue	Inning	Pitcher	Opposing team	Box
1	June 18	Matt Dominguez (Note: 1st MLB grand slam)	Minute Maid Park	7	Tom Gorzelanny	Milwaukee Brewers	
2	July 31	Jason Castro	Oriole Park at Camden Yards	4	Miguel González	Baltimore Orioles	
3	September 13	Matt Dominguez	Minute Maid Park	5	Cory Rasmus	Los Angeles Angels	

==== Hitting for the cycle ====
Date	Player	H / AB	R	1B	2B	3B	HR	BI	Other	Score	Opponent	Box
July 19	Brandon Barnes	5-for-5	3	6, 9	8	4	2	2		7–10	Seattle Mariners	
Barnes: 2B (10) • 3B (1) • HR (5) • RBI (21)

=== Awards ===
2013 Houston Astros award winners
Name of award		Recipient	Ref.
American League (AL) Player of the Week	May 26	Jason Castro	
American League (AL) Player of the Week	August 25	Jason Castro	
Darryl Kile Good Guy Award		Carlos Corporán	
Fred Hartman Award for Long and Meritorious Service to Baseball		Steve Perry	
Houston-Area Major League Player of the Year	ARI	Paul Goldschmidt	
Houston Astros	Most Valuable Player (MVP)	Jason Castro	
Houston Astros	Pitcher of the Year	Brett Oberholtzer	
Houston Astros	Rookie of the Year	Jarred Cosart	
MLB All-Star Game	Reserve catcher	Jason Castro	
Wilson Defensive Player of the Year (Note: Selection criteria for the Wilson MLB Defensive awards have evolved throughout its lifespan. In 2012, the year the awards were instituted, and 2013, one award was presented to one outstanding defender on each team, regardless of position, as well as one to the outstanding defender for each league, regardless of position or team.)	Team	Matt Dominguez	

Other awards results

Name of award	Voting recipient(s) (Team)	Ref.
Roberto Clemente	Winner—Beltrán (STL) • Nominee—Altuve (HOU)	

== Minor league system ==
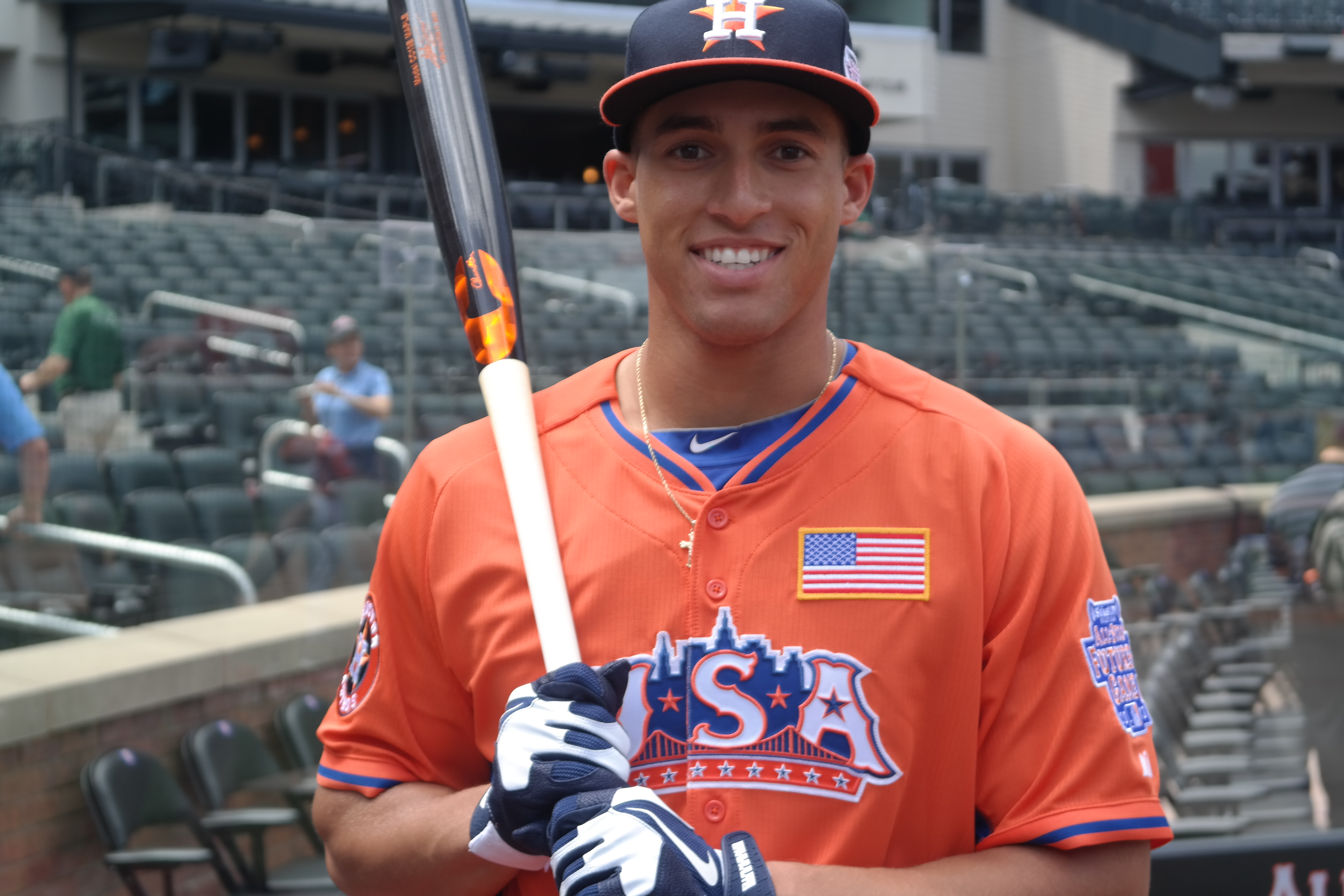
George Springer at the 2013 All-Star Futures Game.

Level	Team	League	Manager
AAA	Oklahoma City RedHawks	Pacific Coast League	Tony DeFrancesco
AA	Corpus Christi Hooks	Texas League	Keith Bodie
A	Lancaster JetHawks	California League	Rodney Linares
A	Quad Cities River Bandits	Midwest League	Omar López
A-Short Season	Tri-City ValleyCats	New York–Penn League	Ed Romero
Rookie	Greeneville Astros	Appalachian League	Josh Bonifay
Rookie	GCL Astros	Gulf Coast League	Edgar Alfonzo

=== Championships ===
- Midwest League champions: Quad Cities River Bandits

=== Summary ===
On August 9, 2013, George Springer homered twice, recording his 30th home run of the season during the fifth inning off Matt Fox to join the 30–30 club. This effort led a 6–3 Oklahoma City triumph over the Las Vegas 51s at Cashman Field. Springer became the first minor leaguer to accomplish the feat since Grant Desme connected for 33 round trippers and purloined 42 bases in 2009 in the Oakland Athletics system. In 135 games between Corpus Christi and Oklahoma City, George Springer produced 106 runs scored, collected 149 hits, 27 doubles, 4 tiples, 37 home runs, 108 RBI, 45 stolen bases, and .303/.411/.600/1.010.

=== Awards and achievements ===
==== Power—speed club ====
30 home runs—30 stolen bases club
Player	AVG	Runs	HR	SB	PSN
George Springer	.303	106	37	45	40.6

==== Annual awards ====
- All-Star Futures Game:
  - SS: Carlos Correa
  - OF: George Springer
- Appalachian League Manager of the Year: Josh Bonifay
- Baseball America First Team Minor League All-Star—Outfielder: George Springer
- Houston Astros Minor League Player of the Year: George Springer, RF
- Midwest League All-Star Team—Shortstop: Carlos Correa
- Texas League All-Star Game:
  - Third baseman: Jonathan Meyer
  - Outfielder: George Springer
  - Pitcher: David Martínez
- Texas League All-Star Game Most Valuable Player Award (TL ASG MVP): George Springer
- Texas League Most Valuable Player Award (MVP): George Springer
- Texas League Pitcher of the Year Award: David Martínez, RHP

== See also ==
- List of first overall Major League Baseball draft picks
- List of Major League Baseball players to hit for the cycle
