= David Martínez (baseball) =

Venezuelan baseball player (born 1987)

Líderes de Miranda – No. 43
- Pitcher
- Born: August 4, 1987 (age 39); Cumaná, Venezuela
- Batted: Right Threw: Right

Professional debut
- MLB: August 21, 2013, for the Houston Astros
- CPBL: March 30, 2018, for the Uni-President Lions

Last appearance
- MLB: July 13, 2014, for the Houston Astros
- CPBL: August 15, 2018, for the Uni-President Lions

MLB statistics
- Win–loss record: 1–0
- Earned run average: 6.38
- Strikeouts: 12

CPBL statistics
- Win–loss record: 4–6
- Earned run average: 7.73
- Strikeouts: 53
- Stats at Baseball Reference

Teams
- Houston Astros (2013–2014); Uni-President Lions (2018)

David José Martínez (born August 4, 1987) is a Venezuelan professional baseball pitcher for the Líderes de Miranda of the Venezuelan Major League. He played in Major League Baseball (MLB) for the Houston Astros and in the Chinese Professional Baseball League (CPBL) for the Uni-President Lions.

== Career ==
=== Houston Astros ===
On March 3, 2005, Martínez signed with the Houston Astros organization as an international free agent. He spent the first four seasons of his career with the Venezuelan Summer League Astros, recording a 16–5 record and 3.33 ERA with 115 strikeouts across 51 total appearances. Martínez remained in rookie ball in 2009, logging a 4.50 ERA in 22 contests for the Greeneville Astros. In 2010 he made 17 appearances (10 starts) for the Low–A Tri-City ValleyCats, registering a 5–2 record and 3.02 ERA with 57 strikeouts in 65 2/3 innings.

Martínez spent the 2011 season with the Single–A Lexington Legends, recording a 5–7 record and 4.19 ERA with 44 strikeouts across 66 2/3 innings pitched. In 2012, he worked out of the rotation of the High–A Lancaster JetHawks, pitching to a 9–5 record and 4.38 ERA with 114 strikeouts across 160 1/3 innings of work. In 2013, Martínez played for the Corpus Christi Hooks of the Double-A Texas League and the Oklahoma City RedHawks of the Triple–A Pacific Coast League. He won two consecutive pitcher of the month awards from the Astros.

On August 20, 2013, Martínez was selected to the 40-man roster and promoted to the major leagues for the first time. He made 4 appearances for Houston in his debut campaign, struggling to a 7.15 ERA with 6 strikeouts in 11 1/3 innings. In 2014, Martínez made three appearances for the Astros, surrendering four runs on five hits with six strikeouts in seven innings pitched. On September 2, 2014, he was designated for assignment following the promotions of Nick Tropeano and Jorge de León. He cleared waivers and was sent outright to Triple–A Oklahoma City on September 5. Martínez elected free agency following the season on November 3.

=== Texas Rangers ===
On November 20, 2014, Martínez signed a minor league contract with the Texas Rangers. He split the 2015 season between the Double–A Frisco RoughRiders and Triple–A Round Rock Express, accumulating a 3–5 record and 3.21 ERA with 49 strikeouts and 22 saves across 67 1/3 innings pitched. Martínez elected free agency after the season on November 7, 2015.

=== Minnesota Twins ===
On December 15, 2015, Martínez signed a minor league contract with the Minnesota Twins. In 19 games (6 starts) for the Triple–A Rochester Red Wings, he worked to a 6.23 ERA with 41 strikeouts across 52.0 innings of work. On July 7, 2016, Martínez was released by the Twins organization.

=== Detroit Tigers ===
On July 8, 2016, Martínez signed a minor league contract with the Detroit Tigers. In 12 games for the Double–A Erie SeaWolves, he registered a 2–3 record and 5.62 ERA with 34 strikeouts across 41 2/3 innings pitched.

On January 24, 2017, Martínez re–signed with the Tigers on a new minor league contract. He was released in March 2017.

=== Houston Astros (second stint) ===
On April 5, 2017, Martínez signed a minor league contract with the Houston Astros organization. In 25 games (23 starts) for the Triple–A Fresno Grizzlies, Martínez recorded a 7–12 record and 4.69 ERA with 101 strikeouts in 136 1/3 innings pitched. He elected free agency following the season on November 6.

=== Uni-President Lions ===
On February 7, 2018, Martínez signed with the Uni-President Lions of the Chinese Professional Baseball League. In 17 games (16 starts) for the Lions, he struggled to a 4–6 record and 7.73 ERA with 53 strikeouts across 75 2/3 innings of work. Martínez was released by the team on August 16.

=== Staten Island FerryHawks ===
On May 18, 2022, Martínez signed with the Staten Island FerryHawks of the Atlantic League of Professional Baseball. In five starts for Staten Island, he logged a 2–2 record and 6.11 ERA with 23 strikeouts in 28 innings of work. Martínez became a free agent following the season.

=== Caciques de Distrito ===
In May 2025, Martínez signed with the Caciques de Distrito of the Venezuelan Major League.

== See also ==
- List of Major League Baseball players from Venezuela
