= Justin Maxwell =

American baseball player (born 1983)

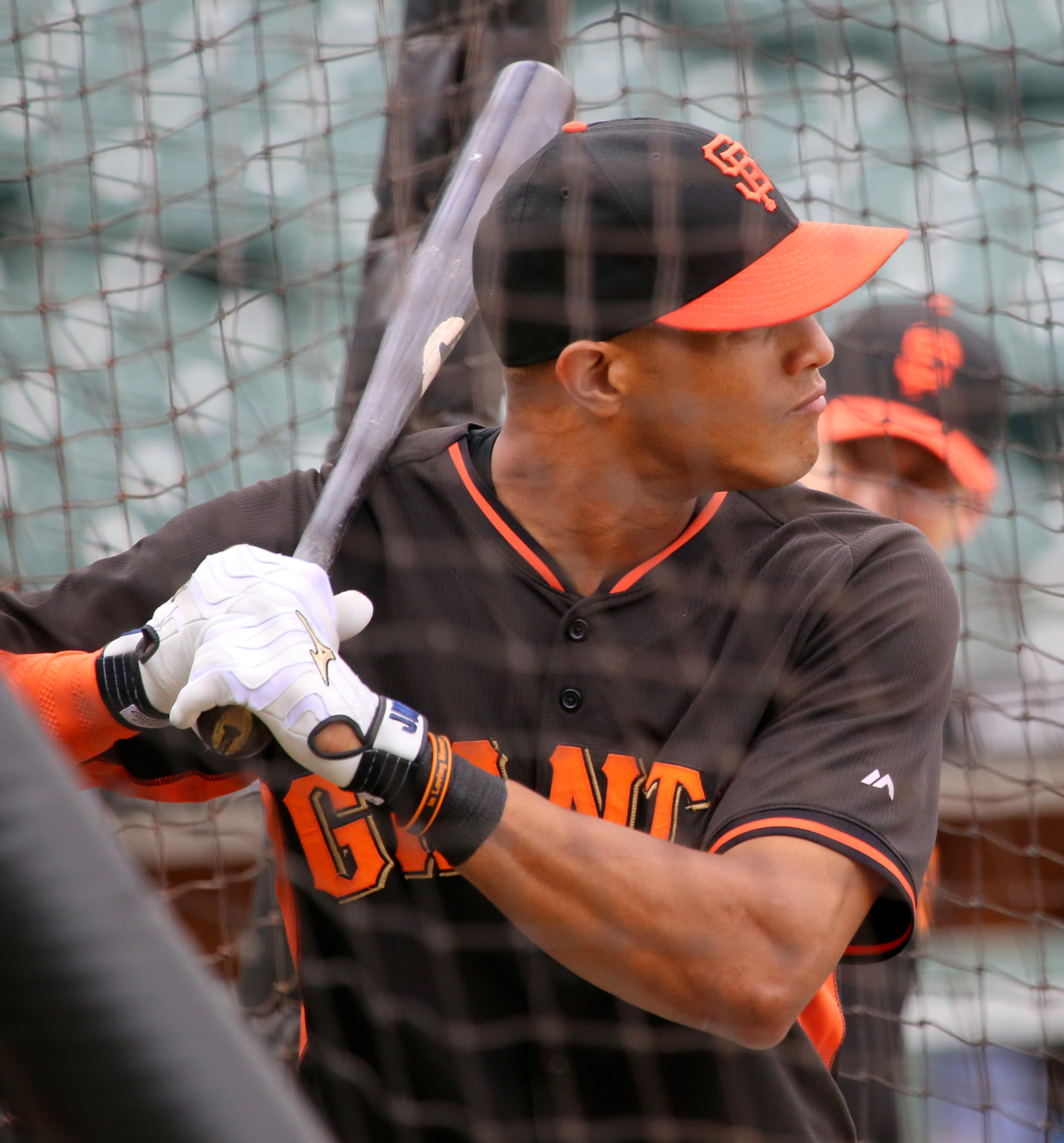
- Maxwell with the San Francisco Giants
- Outfielder
- Born: November 6, 1983 (age 42); Olney, Maryland, U.S.
- Batted: Right Threw: Right

Professional debut
- MLB: September 5, 2007, for the Washington Nationals
- KBO: July 19, 2016, for the Lotte Giants

Last appearance
- MLB: August 31, 2015, for the San Francisco Giants
- KBO: August 17, 2016, for the Lotte Giants

MLB statistics
- Batting average: .220
- Home runs: 41
- Runs batted in: 133

KBO statistics
- Batting average: .288
- Home runs: 4
- Runs batted in: 16
- Stats at Baseball Reference

Teams
- Washington Nationals (2007, 2009–2010); Houston Astros (2012–2013); Kansas City Royals (2013–2014); San Francisco Giants (2015); Lotte Giants (2016)

Justin Adam Maxwell (born November 6, 1983) is an American former professional baseball outfielder. He played in Major League Baseball (MLB) for the Washington Nationals, Houston Astros, Kansas City Royals, and San Francisco Giants. He also played in the KBO League for the Lotte Giants.

== Early life ==
Maxwell is the son of Austin Maxwell, a US Navy dentist who also served as the "presidential dentist" from 1997 to 2002, providing dental care for US Presidents Bill Clinton and George W. Bush, and Vice President Al Gore, and their families. His mother, Kathy, was also a Navy officer. He has one sister. He grew up in Maryland and South Carolina, and lived in Japan for four years while his father was stationed there.

Maxwell was drafted out of Sherwood High School by the Baltimore Orioles in the 43rd round (1279th overall) of the 2001 Major League Baseball draft, but opted instead to attend college at the University of Maryland. In 2003, he played collegiate summer baseball with the Bourne Braves of the Cape Cod Baseball League, was named a league all-star, and returned to the league in 2004 to play for the Cotuit Kettleers. He was drafted, again, in 2004 by the Texas Rangers in the 10th round (291st overall), but declined.

== Professional career ==
=== Washington Nationals ===
In the 2005 Major League Baseball draft by the Washington Nationals in the fourth round (114th overall). He signed and played most of 2006 for the Vermont Lake Monsters, the Nationals' Low-A affiliate.

In 2007, he split his time between Low-A Hagerstown, and High-A Potomac, where, he combined to hit .281 with 27 home runs, 83 RBI and 35 stolen bases, the only player in Minor League Baseball to record at least 25 doubles, 25 home runs and 25 stolen bases in 2007."

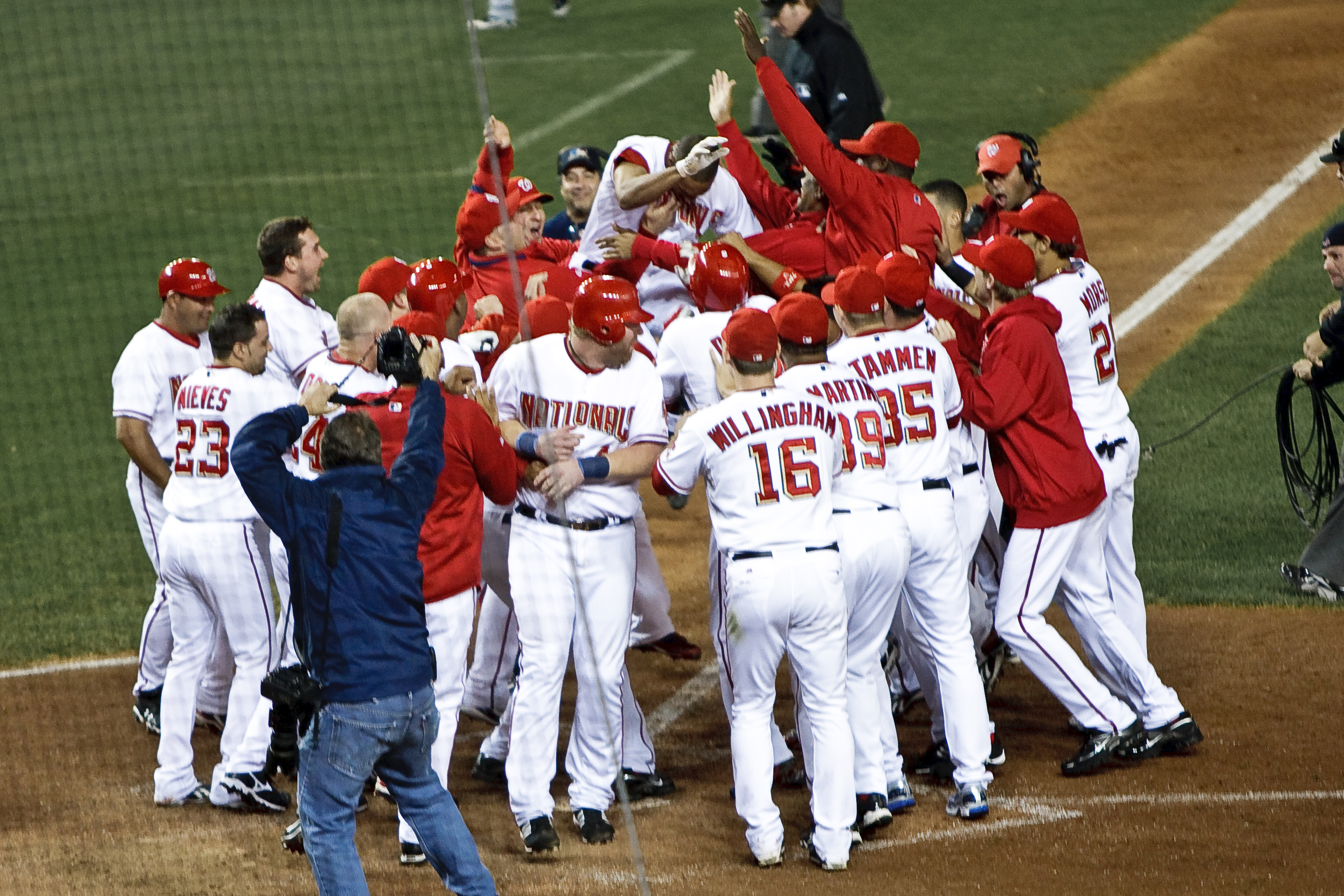
Washington Nationals players celebrate a walk-off grand slam by Maxwell on September 30, 2009

After the minor league season ended, the Nationals promoted Maxwell to the major leagues, though he "was told not to expect much from his first month in the majors." On September 5, he made his debut, as a pinch hitter, and flied out to the warning track. Six days later, in his third pinch hitting appearance, Maxwell recorded his first career base hit, a pinch-hit grand slam off an 0–2 pitch from Chris Seddon, of the Florida Marlins. After the 2007 regular season, Maxwell played for the Peoria Javelinas in the Arizona Fall League.

Maxwell was assigned to the Harrisburg Senators of the Double-A Eastern League in 2008 after hitting .280 in 13 spring training games for Washington, but missed most of the year with a fractured wrist suffered while diving for a flyball in the outfield.

Maxwell spent most of the 2009 season with the Triple-A Syracuse Chiefs of the International League. He was called up late in the season because of injured center fielder Nyjer Morgan. On September 30, Maxwell hit a two-out full count walk off grand slam off of Francisco Rodriguez of the New York Mets on Fan Appreciation Day, the Nationals' last home game of the season.

Maxwell split time with the Triple-A Syracuse Chiefs of the International League and the Nationals in 2010. On September 15, Maxwell hit a grand slam in the 2nd inning off of Mike Minor of the Atlanta Braves giving him three grand slams in four career at bats with the bases loaded. In September, Maxwell sat out two games with a minor thumb injury suffered on September 18. He returned September 21 against the Houston Astros. Maxwell underwent Tommy John surgery after the season.

=== New York Yankees ===
On February 2, 2011, the Nationals traded Maxwell to the New York Yankees for minor league pitcher Adam Olbrychowski. Maxwell began the season with the Triple-A Scranton/Wilkes-Barre Yankees, but his season ended prematurely due to a torn labrum. The Yankees designated Maxwell for assignment at the end of spring training in 2012.

=== Houston Astros ===
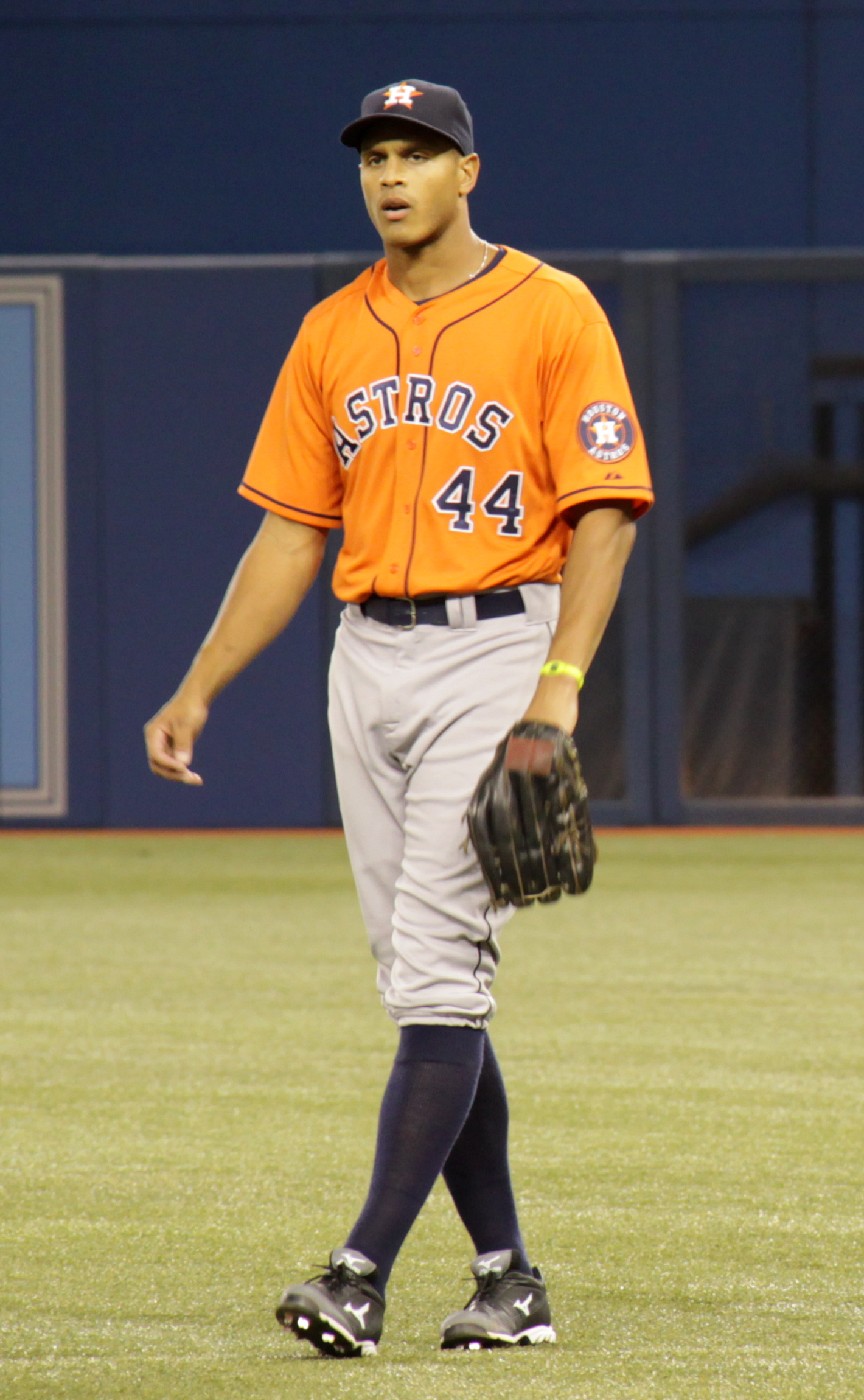
Maxwell during his tenure with the Houston Astros in 2013

The Houston Astros claimed Maxwell off waivers on April 8. Maxwell led the team in home runs with 18. He batted .229 and had 53 RBIs. He hit the last Home Run for the Astros as an NL franchise.

=== Kansas City Royals ===
Maxwell was traded to the Kansas City Royals in exchange for Kyle Smith on July 31, 2013. He hit a walk-off grand slam on September 22, against the Texas Rangers.

Maxwell was designated for assignment on May 16, 2014. On June 21, the Royals selected Maxwell's contract, adding him back to their active roster. He was designated for assignment again on June 30. Maxwell elected free agency on October 4.

=== San Francisco Giants ===
On November 24, 2014, Maxwell signed a minor league contract with the San Francisco Giants organization. Entering spring training as a non-roster hopeful for the San Francisco Giants, Maxwell hit for power and a .300+ batting average, causing the team to add him to their Opening Day roster on March 31, 2015. He was designated for assignment on September 1.

=== Boston Red Sox ===
On November 30, 2015, Maxwell signed a minor league contract with the Miami Marlins. He was released on March 29, 2016.

On April 1, 2016, Maxwell signed a minor league contract with the Boston Red Sox.

=== Lotte Giants ===
On July 6, 2016, Maxwell signed with Lotte Giants of the KBO League for the rest of 2016 season.

== Post-playing career ==
From August 31 to September 3, 2019, Maxwell made his debut as a broadcaster, serving as a substitute studio analyst on the Nats Xtra shows that aired before and after Washington Nationals games on the Mid-Atlantic Sports Network. He has served as a substitute for regular analyst F.P. Santangelo on the MASN broadcast of Nationals games during the 2021 season.

== Personal life ==
Maxwell is married and has three children.

Maxwell enrolled at the University of Maryland School of Dentistry in 2019 and graduated as a Doctor of Dental Surgery in 2022. As of 2025, he operates a dental practice called Major League Smiles in Ellicott City, Maryland.

== See also ==
- Houston Astros award winners and league leaders
