= Chia-Jen Lo =

Taiwanese baseball player (born 1986)

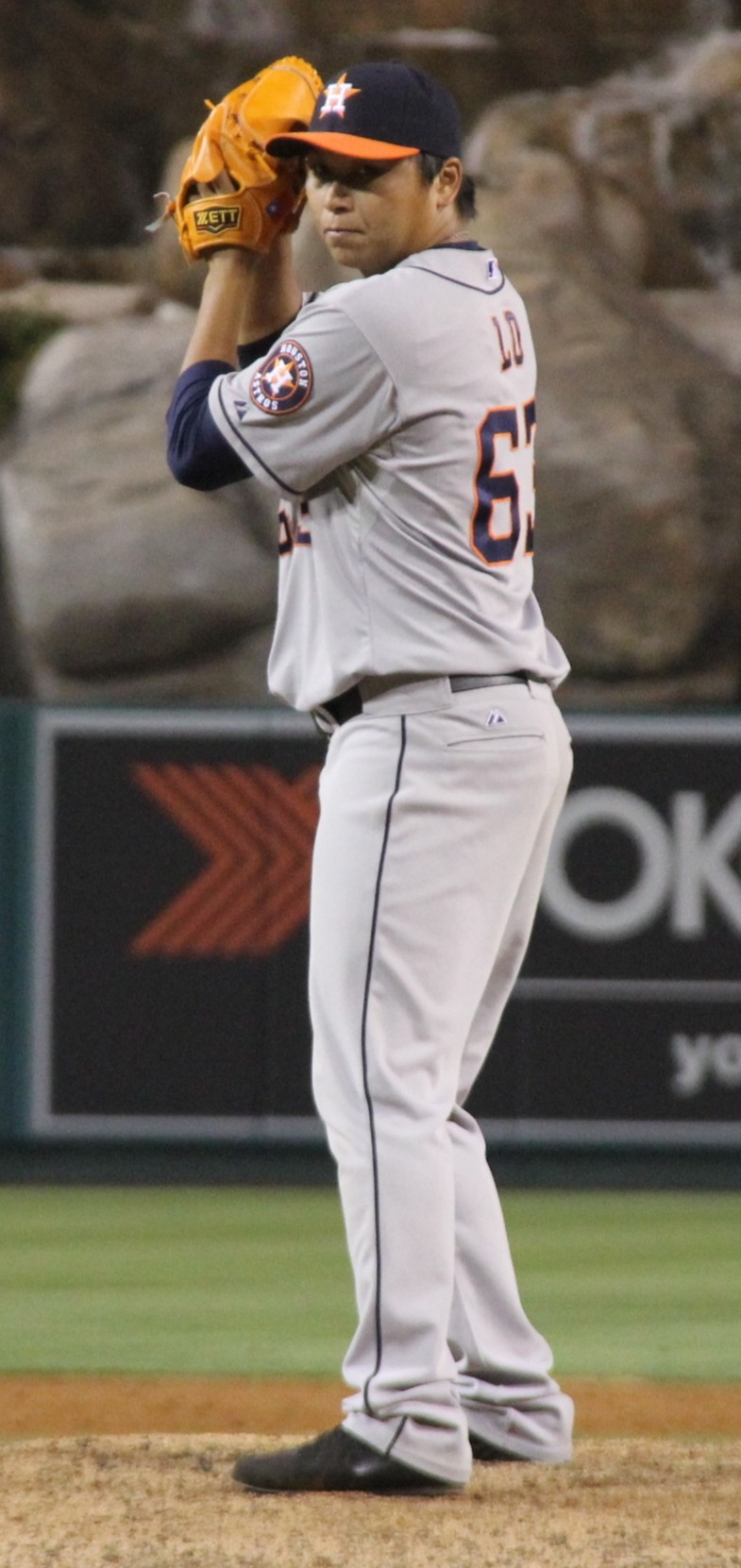
- Lo with the Houston Astros

Wei Chuan Dragons – No. 19
- Pitcher / Coach
- Born: 7 April 1986 (age 39); Pingtung County, Taiwan
- Batted: Right Threw: Right

Professional debut
- MLB: July 31, 2013, for the Houston Astros
- CPBL: August 7, 2014, for the EDA Rhinos

Last appearance
- MLB: September 28, 2013, for the Houston Astros
- CPBL: August 22, 2019, for the Fubon Guardians

MLB statistics
- Win–loss record: 0–3
- Earned run average: 4.19
- Strikeouts: 16

CPBL statistics
- Win–loss record: 6–6
- Earned run average: 5.25
- Strikeouts: 67
- Stats at Baseball Reference

Teams
- Houston Astros (2013); EDA Rhinos/Fubon Guardians (2014–2019)

Chia-Jen Lo
- Traditional Chinese: 羅嘉仁
- Simplified Chinese: 罗嘉仁
Transcriptions
Standard Mandarin
- Hanyu Pinyin: Luó Jiārén
- Bopomofo: ㄌㄨㄛˊ ㄐㄧㄚㄖㄣˊ
- Wade–Giles: Lo^{2} Chia^{1}jen^{2}
Southern Min
- Hokkien POJ: Lô Ka-jîn

Chia-Jen Lo (born 7 April 1986) is a Taiwanese former professional baseball pitcher who currently serves as a coach for the Wei Chuan Dragons' farm team in the Chinese Professional Baseball League (CPBL). He played in Major League Baseball (MLB) for the Houston Astros and in the CPBL for the Fubon Guardians.

== Playing career ==
=== Houston Astros ===
On October 31, 2008, Lo signed with the Houston Astros. Lo made his professional debut with the High-A Lancaster JetHawks, and also spent time with the Double-A Corpus Christi Hooks, logging a 2.10 ERA in 42 appearances between the two teams. Lo was invited to Spring Training with the Astros in 2010, but did not make the team and was assigned to Corpus Christi, where he spent the season, posting a 1.80 ERA in 7 appearances. In 2011, Lo played for the Single-A Lexington Legends, but only appeared in 2 games and struggled to a 13.50 ERA. The following season, Lo split the year between Lancaster and the rookie-level Gulf Coast League Astros, pitching to an 0.90 ERA with 31 strikeouts in 30 innings across 19 appearances. Lo was added to the Astros' 40-man roster after the 2012 season.

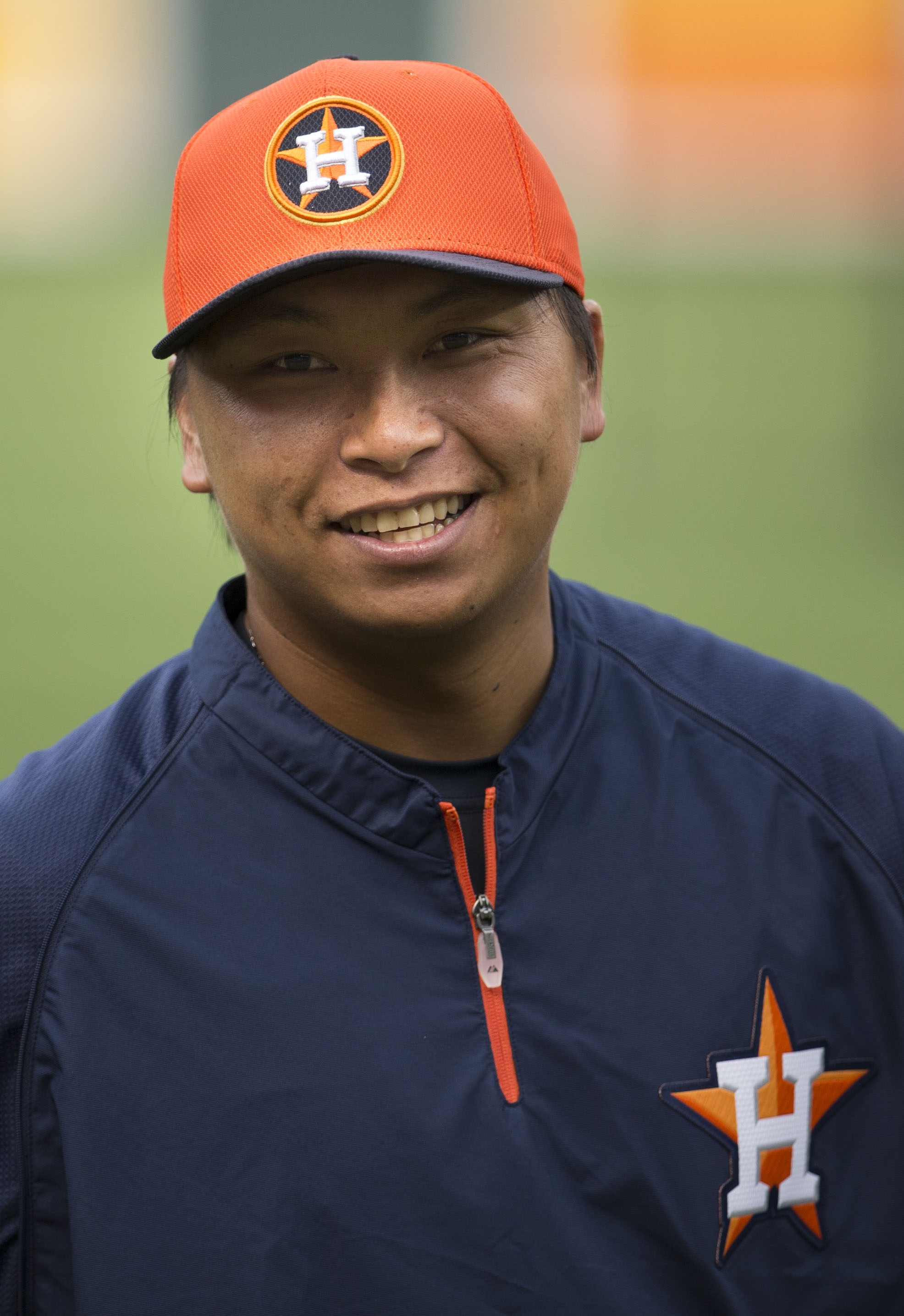
Lo pitching for the Houston Astros in 2013

On July 29, 2013, Lo was promoted to the major leagues for the first time by the Astros. He made his major league debut on July 31, pitching one scoreless inning of relief and recording his first career strikeout in an 11–0 win over the Baltimore Orioles. Lo made 19 appearances with Houston in 2013, recording an 0-3 record and 4.19 ERA. In 17 minor league games with Corpus Christi, the Single-A Quad Cities River Bandits, and the Low-A Tri-City ValleyCats, Lo accumulated a 3.24 ERA.

On April 5, 2014, Lo was outrighted off of the Astros' 40-man roster. He was assigned to the Triple-A Oklahoma City RedHawks, and recorded a 4.74 ERA in 16 games before he was released by Houston on May 27.

=== EDA Rhinos/Fubon Guardians ===
Following his release from Houston, Lo signed with the EDA Rhinos of the Chinese Professional Baseball League (CPBL). He spent the year as the teams closer, pitching 15.2 scoreless innings in 12 games with the team. In 2015, Lo played in 49 games with the Rhinos, logging a 2-5 record and 5.19 ERA with 39 strikeouts in 43.1 innings of work. Lo did not appear in a game for the Rhinos in 2016 after undergoing shoulder surgery. In November 2016, the Rhinos rebranded as the Fubon Guardians after Fubon Financial Holding Co. bought the team. In 2017 with, Fubon, Lo recorded a 7.20 ERA in 7 appearances. The following season, Lo made 23 appearances for the Guardians, but struggled to an 8.35 ERA.

After the 2018 season, Lo signed with the Sydney Blue Sox of the Australian Baseball League for the 2018/19 season. Lo posted a 5.00 ERA in 7 games. In 2019, Lo played in only 3 games for Fubon's main team, but struggled to a 16.20 ERA. Lo was released by Guardians because of his poor control after 2019 season.

=== Wei Chuan Dragons ===
On December 31, 2019, Lo signed a contract with the Wei Chuan Dragons of the Chinese Professional Baseball League (CPBL). He spent the entire 2020 season with Wei Chuan's minor league team, without appearing in a game with the main club. On July 18, 2021, it was announced that Lo would undergo Tommy John surgery, ending his season without having appeared in a game for the Dragons. He was released following the season on December 21, 2021.

== International career ==
Lo selected Chinese Taipei national baseball team at the 2008 Summer Olympics, 2009 World Baseball Classic, 2013 exhibition games against Japan, 2014 Asian Games and 2015 WBSC Premier12.

== Coaching career ==
On June 16, 2022, Lo was hired to serve as a coach for the farm team of the Wei Chuan Dragons in the Chinese Professional Baseball League, a role which he maintained through the 2024 season.

== See also ==
- List of Major League Baseball players from Taiwan
