= Carlos Corporán =

Puerto Rican baseball catcher (born 1984)

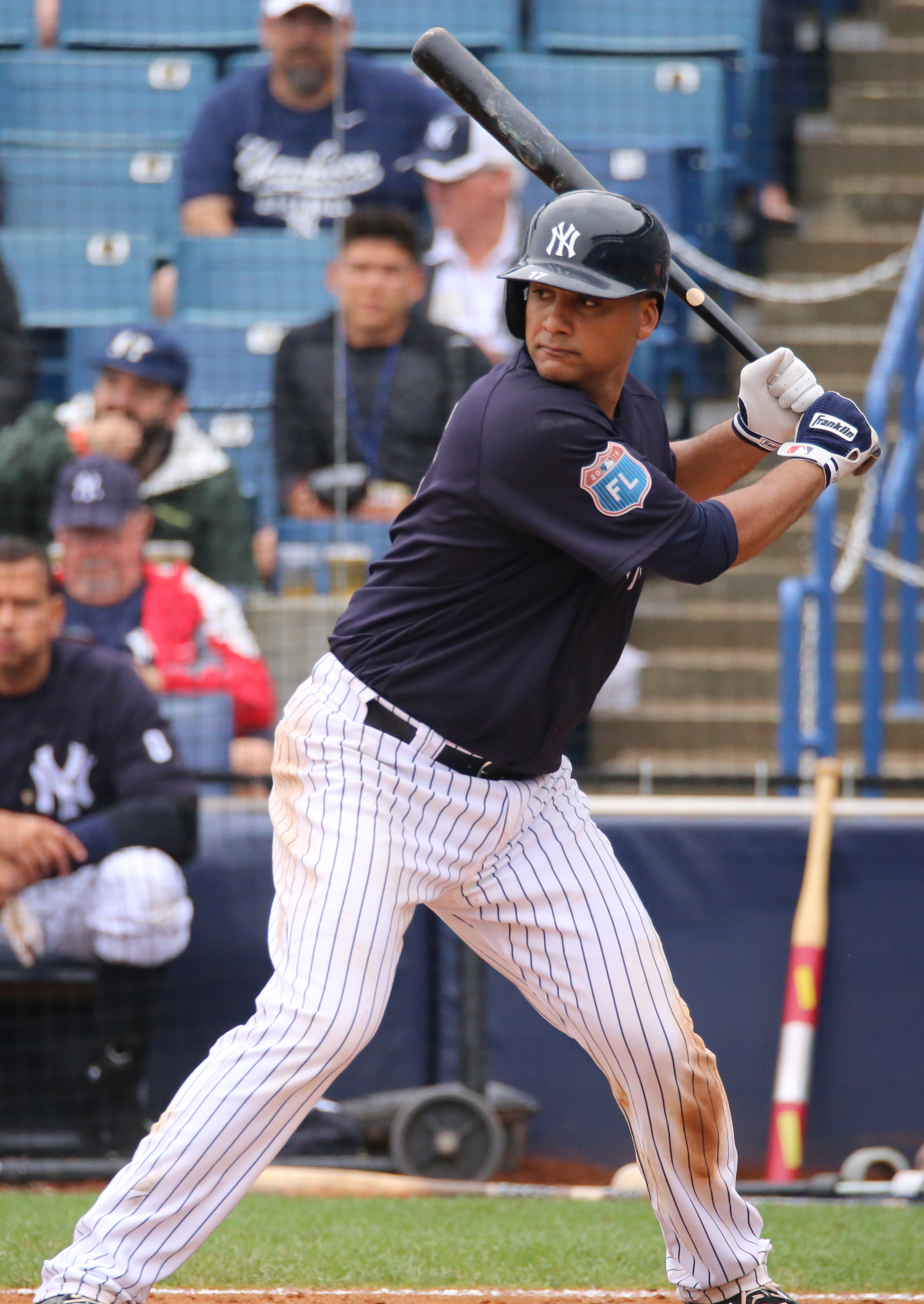
- Corporán with the New York Yankees
- Catcher
- Born: January 7, 1984 (age 42); Hato Rey, Puerto Rico
- Batted: Switch Threw: Right

MLB debut
- May 6, 2009, for the Milwaukee Brewers

Last MLB appearance
- July 12, 2015, for the Texas Rangers

MLB statistics
- Batting average: .218
- Home runs: 20
- Runs batted in: 78
- Stats at Baseball Reference

Teams
- Milwaukee Brewers (2009); Houston Astros (2011–2014); Texas Rangers (2015)

Carlos Fernando Corporán (born January 7, 1984) is a Puerto Rican former professional baseball catcher. He played in Major League Baseball (MLB) for the Milwaukee Brewers, Houston Astros, and Texas Rangers.

== Early life ==
Corporán was born in Hato Rey, Puerto Rico on January 7, 1984. He said that he wanted to play baseball from an early age. "Even at school, when they gave us homework where you had to pick a career, doctor or dentist or whatever, I would choose baseball. My teacher told me, 'That's not a real career.' I said, 'That's what I'm going to do. I'm a baseball player.'" Corporán attended Lake City Community College, where he was converted from a shortstop into a catcher.

== Professional career ==
=== Milwaukee Brewers ===
Corporán was drafted by Milwaukee in the 12th round of the 2003 Major League Baseball draft. In 2003, he played for their Rookie-League Helena Brewers and Arizona Brewers. He was promoted to the Single-A Beloit Snappers in 2004; he stayed in Single-A in 2005, but with the West Virginia Power. In 2006 and 2007, Corporán split his time between the High-A Brevard County Manatees and the Double-A Huntsville Stars.

He started the 2008 season in Huntsville, but was later promoted to the Triple-A Nashville Sounds. In early 2009, he served as a backup catcher in Nashville before being called up to Milwaukee when backup catcher Mike Rivera sprained his ankle. In his only plate appearance for Milwaukee, he got his first hit in the majors off of shortstop Paul Janish. Corporán returned to Nashville after Rivera returned to playing. After the 2009 season, he filed for free agency.

=== Arizona Diamondbacks ===
Corporán was signed to a minor league contract by the Arizona Diamondbacks on December 4, 2009. He also received an invitation to spring training as part of the contract. In 2010, Corporán played for the class Triple-A Reno Aces of the Pacific Coast League. In 87 games, he hit for a .290 batting average, 12 home runs and 50 runs batted in.

=== Houston Astros ===
On June 10, 2011, Corporán was called up by the Houston Astros to replace back-up catcher Robinson Cancel. In 52 games for the Astros, he batted .188/.253/.253 with no home runs and 11 RBI. On November 16, Corporán was removed from the 40-man roster and sent outright to the Triple-A Oklahoma City RedHawks.

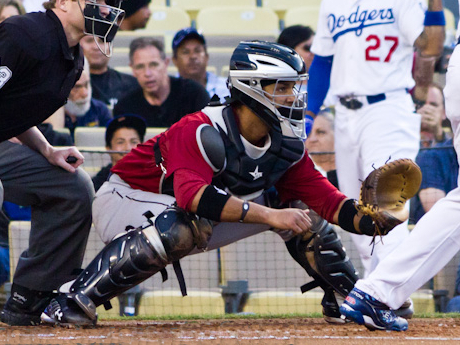
Corporán playing for the Houston Astros in 2011

On July 15, 2012, the Astros selected Corporán's contract, adding him back to their active roster. In 27 appearances for Houston, he slashed .269/.310/.449 with four home runs and 13 RBI.

In 2013, Corporán appeared in a career-high 64 major league games, and hit .225/.287/.361 with seven home runs and 20 RBI. He was recognized by the Houston chapter of the Baseball Writers' Association of America (BBWAA) in 2013 as the recipient of the Darryl Kile Good Guy Award. He made 55 appearances for the Astros during the 2014 season, batting .235/.302/.376 with six home runs and 19 RBI. Corporán was designated for assignment by the Astros on January 19, 2015.

=== Texas Rangers ===
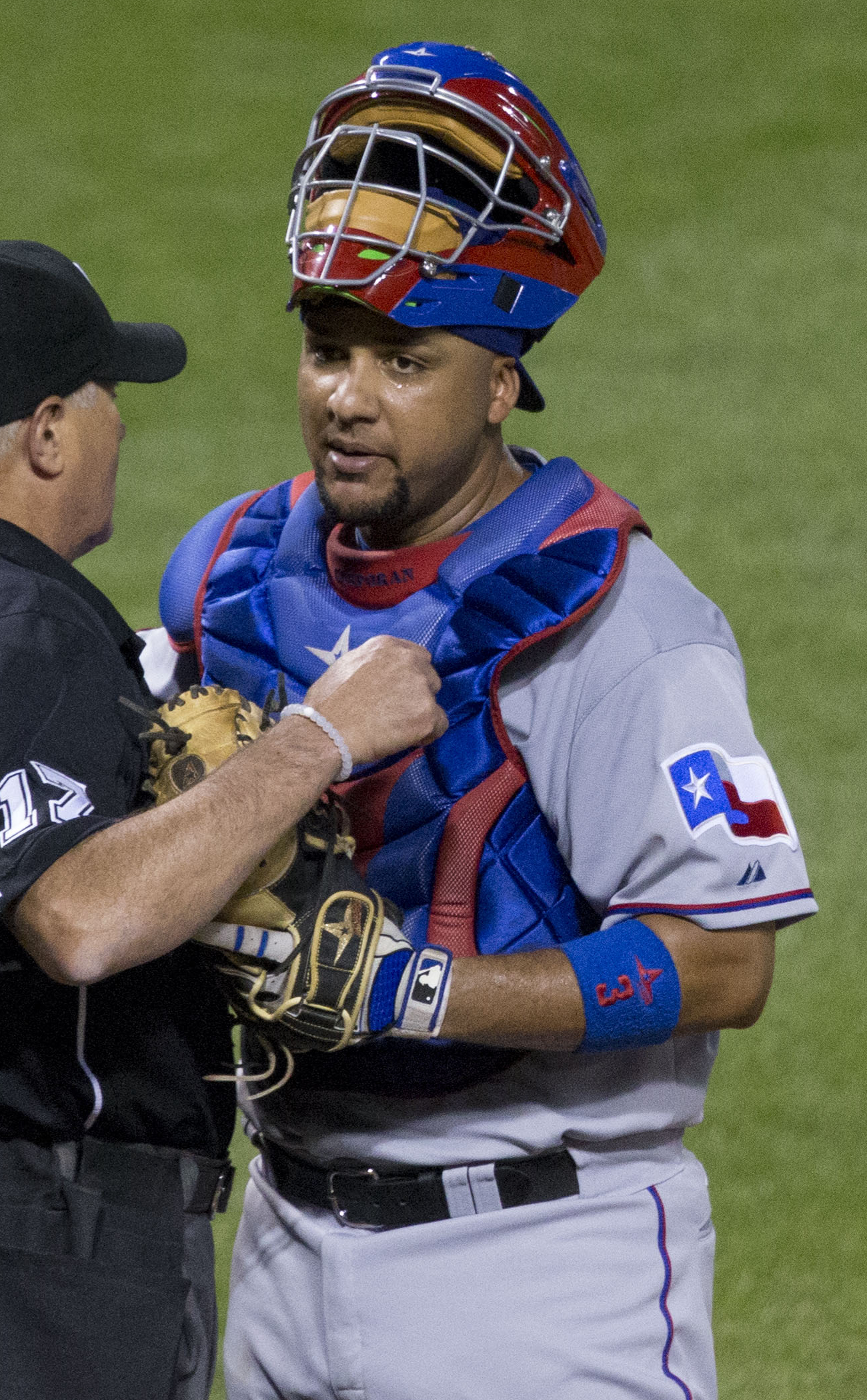
Corporán during his tenure with the Texas Rangers in 2015

On January 21, 2015, Corporán was traded to the Texas Rangers in exchange for minor league pitcher Akeem Bostick. In 33 games for the Rangers, he batted .178/.244/.299, hitting 3 home runs and driving in 15 runs. His season ended prematurely after suffering a thumb injury in mid-July. On October 26, he refused a minor league assignment by the Rangers and instead, opted for free agency.

=== Tampa Bay Rays ===
On January 26, 2016, Corporán signed a minor league contract with the New York Yankees, with an invite to spring training. On April 2, Corporán was traded to the Tampa Bay Rays in exchange for cash considerations. He was released on May 20, after the team signed J. P. Arencibia.

=== Miami Marlins ===
On May 25, 2016, Corporán signed a minor league contract with the Miami Marlins. In 37 appearances for the Triple-A New Orleans Zephyrs, he batted .195/.246/.348 with four home runs and 16 RBI. Corporán was released by the Marlins organization on August 1.

=== Chicago Cubs ===
On January 7, 2017, Corporán signed a minor league contract with the Chicago Cubs. He did not appear for the organization before he was released by the Cubs on May 2.

=== Diablos Rojos del México ===
On January 23, 2018, Corporán signed with the Diablos Rojos del México of the Mexican League. In 39 games for the team, he slashed .259/.390/.336 with one home run and 20 RBI. Corporán was released by the Diablos on July 2.

== Personal life ==
Corporán's 16-month-old son died on October 12, 2012. The Astros organization said that Carlos Corporán Jr. had undergone four heart surgeries since his birth in June 2011. The team released a statement offering its condolences to the Corporán family, calling the boy's battle with serious health issues "an inspiration to so many of us."

== See also ==
- Houston Astros award winners and league leaders
- List of Major League Baseball players from Puerto Rico
