= Paul Clemens (baseball) =

American baseball player (born 1988)

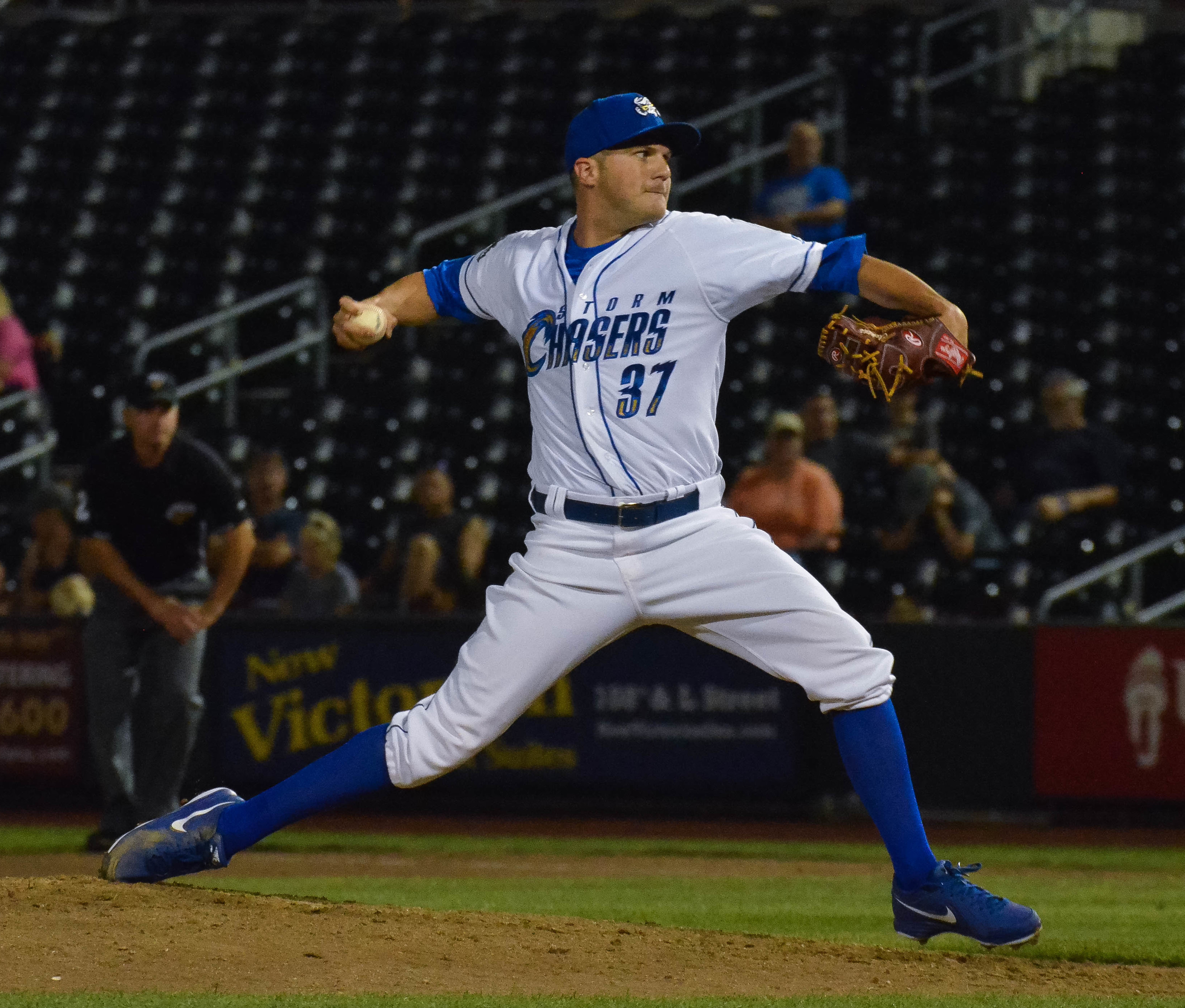
- Clemens with the Omaha Storm Chasers in 2015
- Pitcher
- Born: February 14, 1988 (age 38); Columbia, South Carolina, U.S.
- Batted: Right Threw: Right

MLB debut
- April 9, 2013, for the Houston Astros

Last MLB appearance
- October 2, 2016, for the San Diego Padres

MLB statistics
- Win–loss record: 8–13
- Earned run average: 4.89
- Strikeouts: 118
- Stats at Baseball Reference

Teams
- Houston Astros (2013–2014); Miami Marlins (2016); San Diego Padres (2016)

Paul Arthur Clemens (born February 14, 1988) is an American former professional baseball pitcher. He played in Major League Baseball (MLB) for the Houston Astros, Miami Marlins, and San Diego Padres.

== Early years ==
Clemens attended James W. Robinson, Jr. Secondary School in Fairfax, Virginia, where he lettered three years under head baseball coach Bill Evers. While at Robinson, Clemens broke Javier López's single-game strikeout record by recording 16 strikeouts against Socastee High School in Myrtle Beach, South Carolina.

Clemens played summer baseball for the Virginia Barnstormers. During his senior year at James W. Robinson, Clemens accepted a baseball scholarship to Western Carolina University, but later decided that junior college was a better option. Clemens attended Louisburg College in North Carolina, where he pitched for two seasons. Clemens' tall frame and naturally live arm attracted the attention of MLB scouts early on in his college career.

== Professional career ==
=== Atlanta Braves ===
Clemens was drafted in the 36th-round (1089 overall) by the San Francisco Giants in 2007, but he chose to return to school for another year. He was drafted by the Atlanta Braves in the seventh round of the 2008 MLB draft.

=== Houston Astros ===
On July 31, 2011, Clemens, Jordan Schafer, Brett Oberholtzer and Juan Abreu were traded to the Houston Astros for Michael Bourn.

Clemens was added to the Astros 40-man roster on November 18, 2011. In 2013, Clemens earned a 4–6 record. He pitched the last game of the 2013 Houston Astros season when they played the New York Yankees. He lost to former Astro Andy Pettitte in Pettite's last game. Clemens was designated for assignment by the Astros on September 2, 2014.

=== Philadelphia Phillies ===
Clemens signed a minor league deal with the Philadelphia Phillies on November 20, 2014.

=== Kansas City Royals ===
He was then released after making 7 appearances and signed on with the Kansas City Royals.

=== Miami Marlins ===
On November 30, Clemens signed a minor league deal with the Miami Marlins.

=== San Diego Padres ===
On June 28, 2016, Clemens was claimed off waivers by the San Diego Padres.

On August 6, 2016, Clemens was pulled from the 5th inning of a game against the Philadelphia Phillies for failing to run out a bunt. Earlier in the game, he had gotten pine tar on his original jersey and switched to a new one, number 91, which read "Player" on the back. He was released on March 20, 2017.

=== Minnesota Twins ===
Clemens signed with the Minnesota Twins for the rest of the 2017 season. On July 21, 2017, Clemens was released by the Minnesota Twins.

=== Leones de Yucatán ===
On March 11, 2018, Clemens signed with the Leones de Yucatán of the Mexican Baseball League. He was released on April 23, 2018.

=== Southern Maryland Blue Crabs ===
On May 11, 2018, Clemens signed with the Southern Maryland Blue Crabs of the Atlantic League of Professional Baseball. He became a free agent following the 2018 season.

=== High Point Rockers ===
On April 11, 2019, Clemens signed with the High Point Rockers of the Atlantic League of Professional Baseball. He was released on September 16, 2019.

== Personal life ==
Clemens is married to Marlee Clemens. They have five children.
