= Brandon Barnes (baseball) =

American baseball player (born 1986)

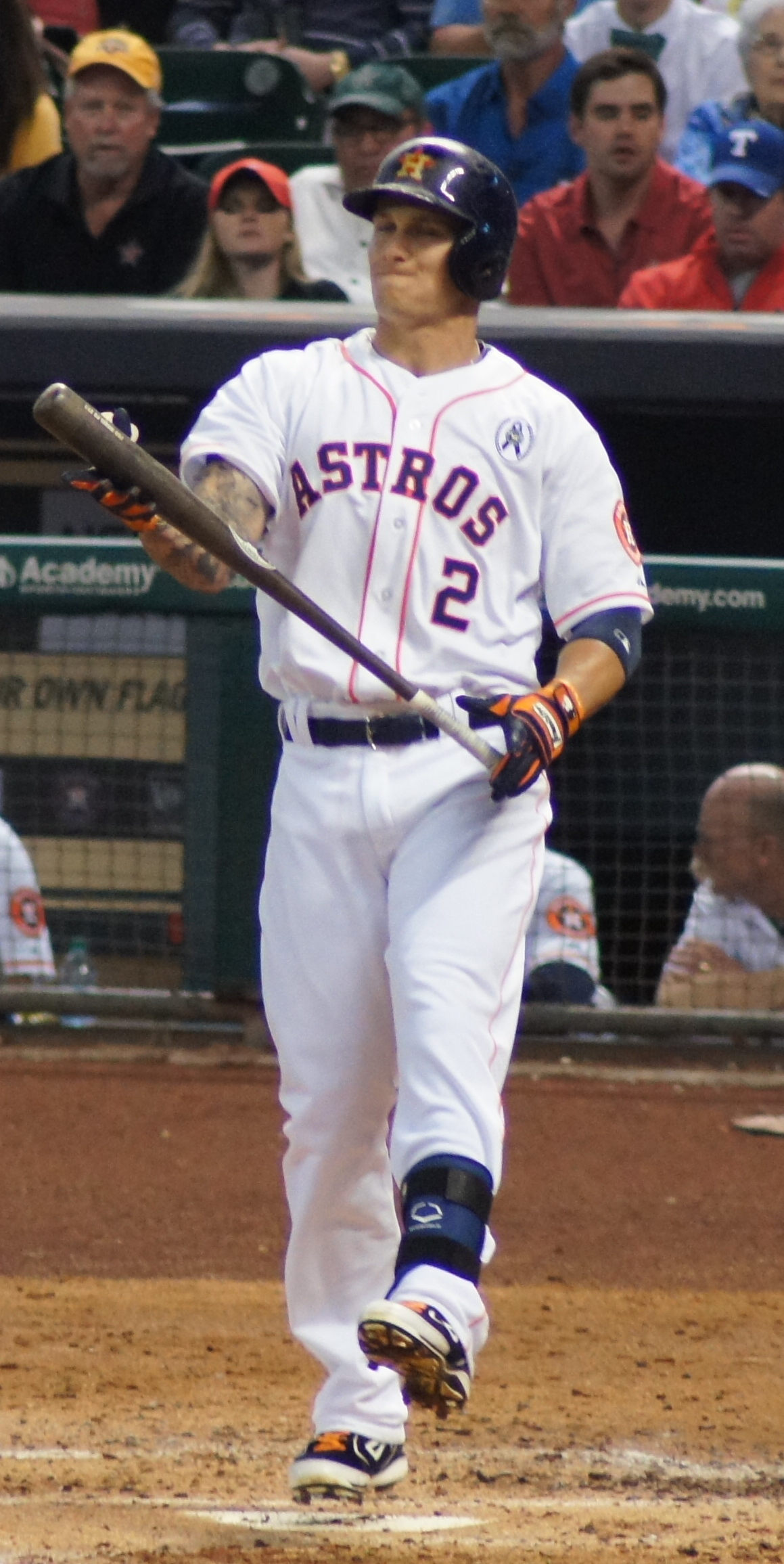
- Barnes with the Houston Astros in 2013
- Outfielder
- Born: May 15, 1986 (age 40); Orange, California, U.S.
- Batted: Right Threw: Right

Professional debut
- MLB: August 7, 2012, for the Houston Astros
- KBO: July 18, 2020, for the Hanwha Eagles

Last appearance
- MLB: September 30, 2018, for the Cleveland Indians
- KBO: October 28, 2020, for the Hanwha Eagles

MLB statistics
- Batting average: .242
- Home runs: 20
- Runs batted in: 102

KBO statistics
- Batting average: .265
- Home runs: 9
- Runs batted in: 42
- Stats at Baseball Reference

Teams
- Houston Astros (2012–2013); Colorado Rockies (2014–2016); Cleveland Indians (2018); Hanwha Eagles (2020)

Career highlights and awards
- Hit for the cycle on July 19, 2013

Brandon Michael Barnes (born May 15, 1986) is an American former professional baseball outfielder. He played in Major League Baseball (MLB) for the Houston Astros, Colorado Rockies and Cleveland Indians and in the KBO League for the Hanwha Eagles.

== Early life ==
Brandon Michael Barnes was born on May 15, 1986, in Orange, California. Barnes attended Katella High School in Anaheim, California, where he excelled in baseball and football. Growing up, Barnes played travel baseball with Minnesota Twins starting pitcher, Phil Hughes, and the pair also played against Mark Trumbo. A talented free safety in football, Barnes did not even play baseball during his senior year at Katella High, and signed a letter of intent to play football at UCLA, but withdrew after a coaching change.

== College career ==
Barnes attended Cypress College, a junior college in Cypress, California, where he returned to playing baseball. Despite Cypress being NJCAA, several MLB players have competed for the school's program, including Trevor Hoffman, Ben Francisco, Jason Vargas, and Gerald Laird. Barnes left Cypress to play professional baseball after only one season.

== Professional career ==
=== Draft and minor leagues ===
Barnes was drafted by the Houston Astros in the sixth round of the 2005 MLB draft.

=== Houston Astros (2012–2013) ===
Barnes was called up to the majors for the first time on August 7, 2012. On May 27, 2013, Barnes hit the Astros first walk off hit of the season. He hit a ground rule double to deep right field, scoring Ronny Cedeno, as the Astros beat the Colorado Rockies 3 to 2. On July 19, 2013, Barnes hit for the cycle, including an inside-the-park home run. One teammate at the time, Jose Altuve, became the next Astro to hit for the cycle on August 28, 2023.

=== Colorado Rockies (2014–2016) ===
On December 3, 2013, Barnes was traded to the Colorado Rockies with pitcher Jordan Lyles for outfielder Dexter Fowler and a player to be named later. On June 14, 2014, he struck a two-out, two-run inside the park home run off the San Francisco Giants Sergio Romo to lead the Rockies to a 5-4 victory. On July 25, 2016, Barnes was designated for assignment. In three years in Denver, Barnes batted .249/.295/.376 with 10 home runs in 703 plate appearances. He was released on September 12, 2016.

=== Miami Marlins ===
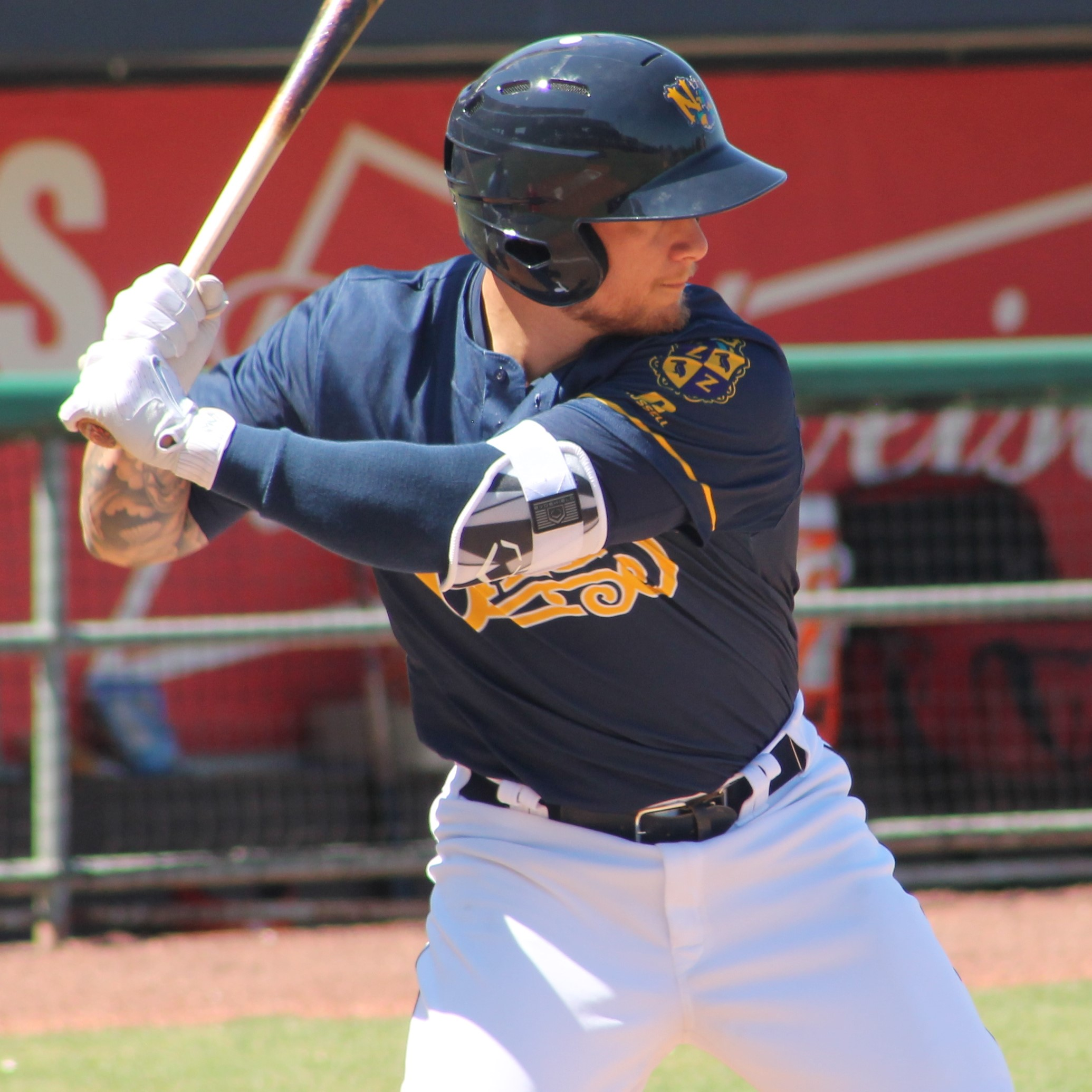
Barnes with the New Orleans Baby Cakes in 2017

On December 16, 2016, Barnes signed a minor league contract with the Miami Marlins. In 109 games for the Triple–A New Orleans Baby Cakes, he batted .276/.331/.420 with 11 home runs, 49 RBI, and 15 stolen bases. Barnes elected free agency following the season on November 6, 2017.

=== Cleveland Indians (2018) ===
On November 30, 2017, Barnes signed a minor league contract with the Cleveland Indians. He was assigned to Triple–A Columbus Clippers to begin the 2018 season.

The Indians purchased Barnes's contract on September 4, 2018. Barnes was outrighted to the minors on November 1, 2018; Barnes rejected the outright assignment, electing free agency instead. Barnes re-signed with the Indians on December 22, 2018, signing a minor league deal with an invitation to the Indians' 2019 major league spring training camp.

=== Minnesota Twins ===
On August 2, 2019, Barnes was traded to the Minnesota Twins. In 26 games for the Triple–A Rochester Red Wings, he hit .186/.259/.412 with six home runs and 18 RBI. Barnes became a free agent following the season on November 4.

=== Cincinnati Reds ===
On February 17, 2020, Barnes signed a minor league deal with the Cincinnati Reds. He did not play in a game in 2020 due to the cancellation of the minor league season because of the COVID-19 pandemic. Barnes was released by the Reds organization on June 17.

=== Hanwha Eagles (2020) ===
On June 22, 2020, Barnes signed with the Hanwha Eagles of the KBO League. He became a free agent following the season.

On December 11, 2020, Barnes announced his retirement on his instagram.

== See also ==
- List of Major League Baseball players to hit for the cycle

Achievements
Preceded by Mike Trout	Hitting for the cycle July 19, 2013	Succeeded by Alex Ríos
