= Matt Dominguez (baseball) =

American baseball player (born 1989)

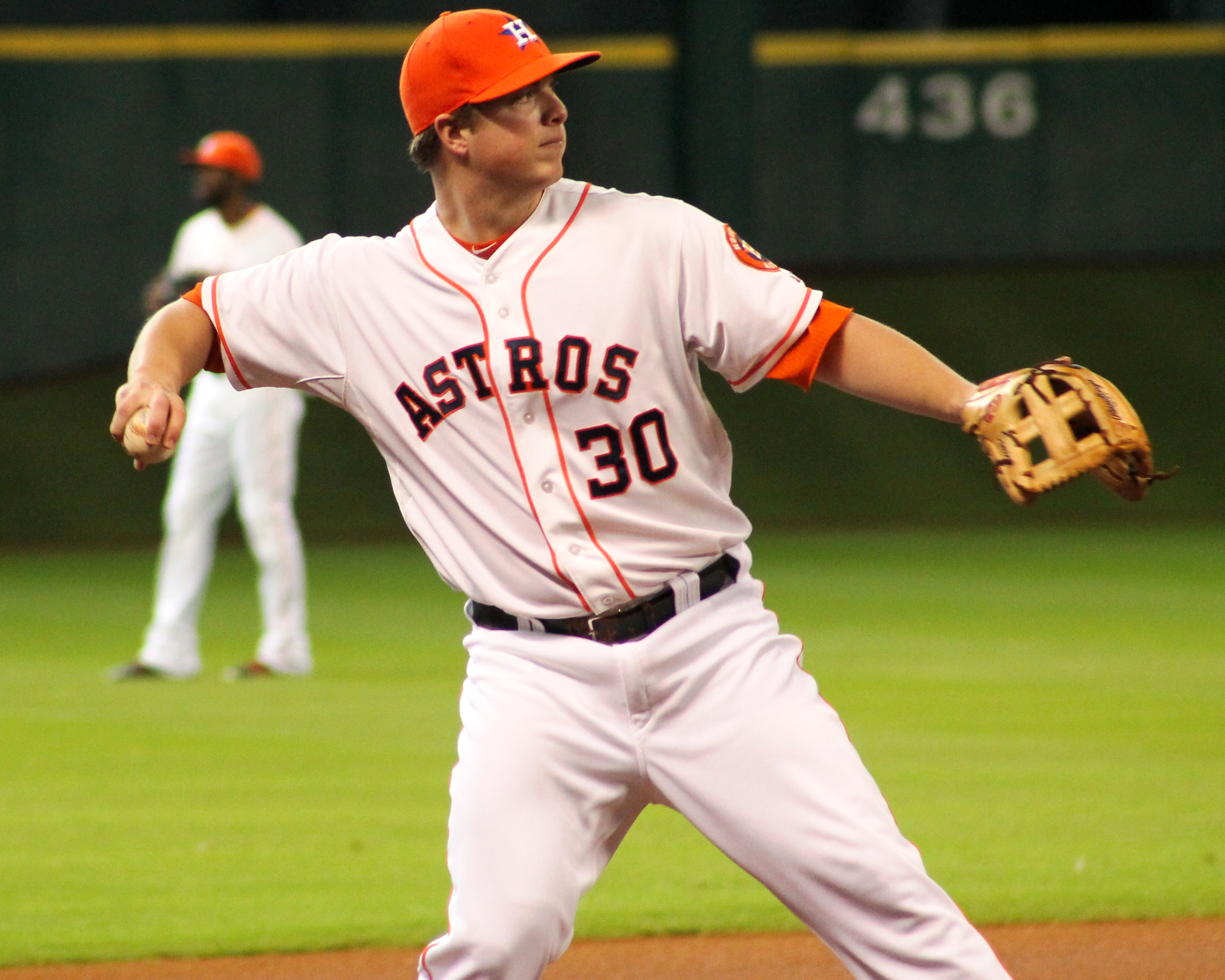
- Dominguez with the Houston Astros in 2014
- Third baseman
- Born: August 28, 1989 (age 37); Chatsworth, California, U.S.
- Batted: Right Threw: Right

Professional debut
- MLB: September 6, 2011, for the Florida Marlins
- NPB: May 5, 2018, for the Chiba Lotte Marines

Last appearance
- MLB: June 6, 2016, for the Toronto Blue Jays
- NPB: July 11, 2018, for the Chiba Lotte Marines

MLB statistics
- Batting average: .231
- Home runs: 42
- Runs batted in: 152

NPB statistics
- Batting average: .222
- Home runs: 13
- Runs batted in: 44
- Stats at Baseball Reference

Teams
- Florida Marlins (2011); Houston Astros (2012–2014); Toronto Blue Jays (2016); Chiba Lotte Marines (2018)
Medals
Men's baseball
Representing United States
World Junior Baseball Championship
Silver medal – second place	2006 Sancti Spíritus	Team

Matthew Scott Dominguez (born August 28, 1989) is an American former professional baseball third baseman. He played in Major League Baseball (MLB) for the Florida Marlins, Houston Astros, and Toronto Blue Jays and in Nippon Professional Baseball (NPB) for the Chiba Lotte Marines.

== Early career ==
Dominguez was born in Van Nuys, California, to Fernando and Cindy Dominguez. His father is a Los Angeles Times copy editor.

He was drafted out of Chatsworth High School by the Marlins with the 12th overall pick in the 2007 Major League Baseball draft.

== Professional career ==
=== Florida Marlins ===
==== Minor leagues ====
Dominguez was assigned to the Rookie level Gulf Coast League Marlins after the draft. After 5 games, he was promoted to the Low–A Jamestown Jammers for the remainder of the season. He batted .158 with one home run and six RBI in 15 total games in 2007. Dominguez played the entire 2008 season with the Single–A Greensboro Grasshoppers, and in 88 games played, hit .296 with 18 home runs and 70 RBI. He split the 2009 season with the Advanced-A Jupiter Hammerheads and Double–A Jacksonville Suns. In 134 total games played, Dominguez hit .247 with 13 home runs and 62 RBI. He was named a mid-season All-Star for Jupiter. In the offseason, Dominguez would play with the Mesa Solar Sox of the Arizona Fall League (AFL), and despite hitting only .188 in 12 games, was named a Rising Star by the AFL.

In 2010, Dominguez was assigned to Jacksonville for the entire season. He participated in the Double-A All-Star Game that season, and was named the game's Top Star. In 138 games played, he hit .252 with 14 home runs and 81 RBI. He was also named a post-season All-Star, and an MiLB.com Organization All-Star for the Marlins. Dominguez battled injuries in the 2011 season, playing in 87 games for the Triple–A New Orleans Zephyrs, but also making rehab appearances for Jupiter and Jacksonville. Dominguez would hit .249 in 2011, along with 12 home runs and 58 RBI, before being called up by the Marlins for the first time in his career. In the offseason, he played in 21 games for the Surprise Saguaros in the AFL, batting .226 with four home runs and 19 RBI, and was again named an AFL Rising Star.

==== Major leagues ====
Dominguez was called up to the major leagues for the first time on September 6, 2011. He made his debut as a pinch hitter that day against the New York Mets. The next day, He got his first major league hit off of Mets' pitcher R. A. Dickey.

Dominguez began the 2012 season in Triple-A New Orleans, and hit .234 in 78 games.

=== Houston Astros ===
On July 4, 2012, Dominguez and Rob Rasmussen were traded to the Houston Astros in exchange for Carlos Lee. He played the next day against the Pittsburgh Pirates and went 0–2. On July 9, Dominguez was sent to the Triple-A Oklahoma City RedHawks, after playing 4 games with the Astros. He hit two home runs in a game against the Texas Rangers. He made the Astros' major league roster in 2013 and 2014, but was sent down to the minors before the start of the 2015 season, losing his starting spot to Luis Valbuena, who was acquired by the Astros in January. In 2013, he hit for a .241 batting average, along with 21 home runs, and 77 runs batted in. The next season, he slumped to a .215 average, 16 home runs, and 57 RBIs. He was designated for assignment on June 8, 2015.

=== Milwaukee Brewers ===
Dominguez was claimed off waivers by the Milwaukee Brewers on June 16, 2015, and was assigned to Triple-A Colorado Springs Sky Sox. In 72 games played for the Sky Sox in 2015, he hit .281 with 6 home runs and 30 RBI, and won an MiLB Gold Glove.

=== Toronto Blue Jays ===
On September 6, 2015, Dominguez was claimed by the Toronto Blue Jays, and optioned to the Triple-A Buffalo Bisons. Dominguez attended 2016 Major League spring training, and was optioned to the Bisons on March 18, 2016. He was recalled by the Blue Jays on April 26, and started at third base against the Chicago White Sox that night. Following a 3–1 victory over the Texas Rangers on May 3, Dominguez was optioned back to Triple-A Buffalo. On June 5, he was recalled by the Blue Jays. Dominguez was placed on optional waivers on June 7. On September 2, Dominguez was designated for assignment to clear roster space for Matt Dermody. Dominguez appeared in five games for the Blue Jays in 2016, going hitless in 11 at–bats. He elected free agency following the season on November 7.

=== Boston Red Sox ===
On December 13, 2016, Dominguez signed a minor league contract with the Boston Red Sox that included an invitation to spring training. He spent the 2017 season with the Triple–A Pawtucket Red Sox, playing in 116 games and batting .264/.295/.425 with 16 home runs and 67 RBI. He elected free agency following the season on November 6, 2017.

=== Chiba Lotte Marines ===
On December 23, 2017, Dominguez signed with the Chiba Lotte Marines of Nippon Professional Baseball (NPB). He made 37 appearances for the Marines in 2018, batting .191/.269/.488 with seven home runs and 16 RBI. Dominguez became a free agent after the season.

== See also ==
- Houston Astros award winners and league leaders
