= Jorge de León (baseball) =

Dominican baseball player (born 1987)

- Pitcher
- Born: August 15, 1987 (age 38); Azua, Azua, Dominican Republic
- Batted: Right Threw: Right

MLB debut
- August 9, 2013, for the Houston Astros

Last MLB appearance
- September 28, 2014, for the Houston Astros

MLB statistics
- Win–loss record: 0–1
- Earned run average: 5.19
- Strikeouts: 10
- WHIP: 1.79
- Stats at Baseball Reference

Teams
- Houston Astros (2013–2014)

Jorge Luis de León (born August 15, 1987) is a Dominican former professional baseball relief pitcher. He played in Major League Baseball (MLB) for the Houston Astros.

== Career ==
=== Houston Astros ===
Signed by scouts Julio Linares and Sergio Beltre, De León began his professional career as a shortstop in 2006, playing for the DSL Astros, hitting .230 in 56 games. Again with the DSL Astros in 2007, De León hit .190 in 52 games. He moved stateside in 2008, playing for the Greeneville Astros and hitting .235 in 32 games. In 2009, he played for the Tri-City ValleyCats and the Lexington Legends, hitting a combined .206 in 66 games. He converted to pitching for the 2010 season, making 23 appearances for the ValleyCats and going 2–1 with a 0.64 ERA.

De León was called up to the majors for the first time on August 8, 2013. On September 18, in the 12th inning, De León retired the opposing side Cincinnati Reds batters on 3 pitches. De León was the first American League player to achieve this in extra innings in over a century, since Hippo Vaughn accomplished the feat in 1910. He was outrighted off the roster on October 17, 2013.

=== Oakland Athletics ===
De León was claimed off waivers by the Oakland Athletics on October 9, 2014. The Athletics designated him for assignment on December 9.

=== Chicago Cubs ===
On January 10, 2015, De Leon signed a minor league contract with the Chicago Cubs.

=== Los Angeles Dodgers ===
The Cubs released de León and he signed another minor league contract with the Los Angeles Dodgers, who assigned him to the Triple–A Oklahoma City Dodgers. He pitched in five games for Oklahoma City and 34 for the Double–A Tulsa Drillers and was 1–4 with a 4.74 ERA. He was released in August.

=== Gary SouthShore Railcats ===
On April 20, 2017, de Leon signed with the Gary SouthShore RailCats of the American Association of Independent Professional Baseball. He re-signed with the team on August 4, 2018.

=== Sugar Land Skeeters ===
On September 13, 2018, de Leon was traded to the Sugar Land Skeeters of the Atlantic League of Professional Baseball. He became a free agent following the 2018 season.
