= 2014 Houston Astros season =

53rd season in Major League Baseball for the Houston Astros

2014 Houston Astros
- League: American League
- Division: West
- Ballpark: Minute Maid Park
- City: Houston, Texas
- Record: 70–92 (.432)
- Divisional place: 4th
- Owners: Jim Crane
- General managers: Jeff Luhnow
- Managers: Bo Porter (Note: Fired on September 1, 2014.) – 59–79 (.428); Tom Lawless (Note: Interim)–11–13 (.458)
- Television: CSN Houston (Bill Brown, Alan Ashby, Geoff Blum)
- Radio: Sportstalk 790 (Robert Ford, Steve Sparks, Milo Hamilton); KLAT (Spanish) (Francisco Romero, Alex Treviño)
- Stats: ESPN.com; Baseball Reference

The 2014 Houston Astros season was the 53rd season for the Major League Baseball (MLB) franchise located in Houston, Texas, their 50th as the Astros, second in both the American League (AL) and AL West division, and 15th at Minute Maid Park. The Astros entered the season with a 51–111 record and last-place finish in the AL West division, 45 games behind the division-champion Oakland Athletics, Houston's worst-ever record to date, and worst record in the major leagues. It had also been their fourth-progressively worse performance, as well the third consecutive of the first three 100-loss seasons in franchise history.

Houston commenced their season on April 1 by hosting the New York Yankees, with Scott Feldman making his first Opening Day start, and won, 6–2. The Astros' first-round draft pick in the amateur draft was pitcher Brady Aiken, at number one overall, and in the sixth round, they chose outfielder Ramón Laureano.

Second baseman Jose Altuve represented the Astros at the 2014 MLB All-Star Game and played for the American League, his second career selection. On September 1, Tom Lawless was named interim manager, the 22nd in franchise history, replacing Bo Porter, who had been fired.

With a 70–92 record and fourth-place finish, Houston improved by 19 wins from the previous season, ending a string of three consecutive last-place finishes, including avoiding a last-place finish in the AL West for the first time.

Altuve established the franchise record for hits (225), leading the major leagues, while becoming the first batting champion (.341) in franchise history. Altuve also received the Silver Slugger Award for the first time. Starting pitcher Dallas Keuchel won his first career Gold Glove Award. Outfielder George Springer was selected to the Topps All-Star Rookie Team.

It was the final season until 2020 in which the Astros failed to produce a winning record. This still remains the last time they finished a full 162-game season with a losing record.

== Offseason ==
=== Summary ===
The Astros concluded the 2013 season with a 51–111 (.315) record, ranking last of five teams in the AL West division, and 45 games behind the division-champion Oakland Athletics. It was Houston's inaugural season as members of the American League after having spent their first 51 as members of the National League. However, the 111 defeats were the most of any season in team history, having surpassed the 55–107 (.340) showing in 2012, their third consecutive season with 100 or more losses, all of which were the first such performances in club history. It was also the fourth season with progressively more defeats than the prior.

Prior to this season, the Astros hired Brent Strom as pitching coach, his second stint in a coaching role with the team. He was previously employed with the team for the 1996, then served at the major league level as pitching coach for the Kansas City Royals for the 2000 and 2001 campaigns.

=== Transactions ===
- December 3, 2023: Traded outfielder Brandon Barnes with pitcher Jordan Lyles to the Colorado Rockies for outfielder Dexter Fowler and a player to be named later.
- December 18, 2023: Selected pitcher Collin McHugh off waivers from the Colorado Rockies.

== Regular season ==
=== Summary ===
==== April—May ====
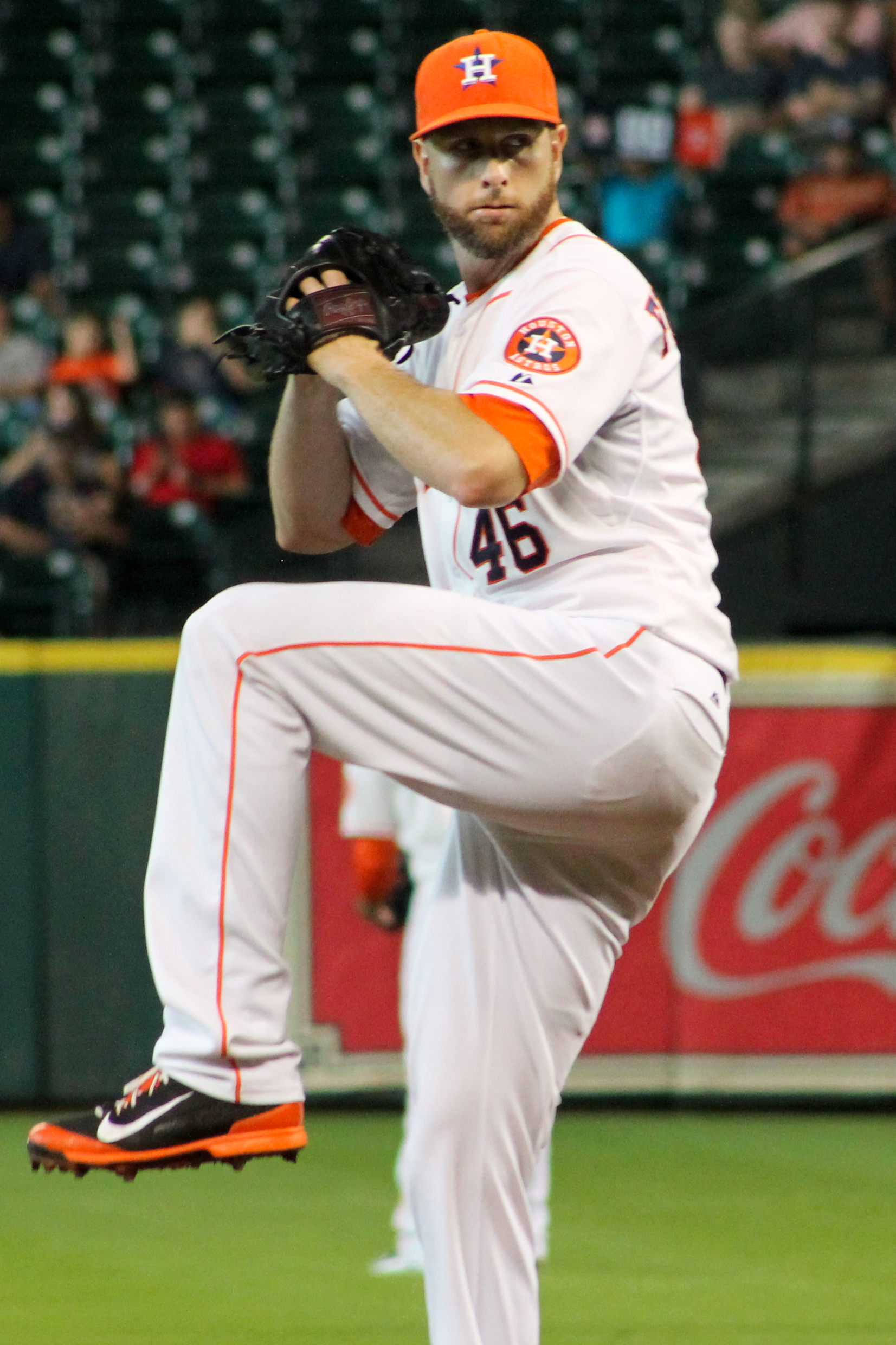
Opening Day starter Scott Feldman delivers the pitch at Minute Maid Park.

Opening Day starting lineup
Uniform	Player	Position
21	Dexter Fowler	Center fielder
19	Robbie Grossman	Left fielder
27	Jose Altuve	Second baseman
15	Jason Castro	Catcher
14	Jesús Guzmán	First baseman
23	Chris Carter	Designated hitter
30	Matt Dominguez	Third baseman
28	L. J. Hoes	Right fielder
6	Jonathan Villar	Shortstop
46	Scott Feldman	Pitcher
Venue: Minute Maid Park • Houston 6, New York (AL) 2 Sources:

Led by Opening Day starter Scott Feldman on April 1, the Astros hosted and defeated the New York Yankees, 6–2. Jesús Guzmán and L. J. Hoes both connected for home runs as the totality of the Astros' scoring occurred within the first two frames off Yankees starter CC Sabathia. Feldman, meanwhile, surrendered two hits over 6 2/3 shutout innings pitched. Dexter Fowler thumped two doubles, while Jose Altuve added two hits and a stolen base.

On April 5, longtime Astros teammates Lance Berkman and Roy Oswalt returned and signed one-day contracts to formally retire as members of the team. During a pre-game ceremony, a tribute played on video monitor with commentary by Nolan Ryan, Tony La Russa, Albert Pujols, and Jake Peavy, and former teammates Craig Biggio, Brad Ausmus, Andy Pettitte, and Adam Everett. They were presented with their framed 2005 World Series jerseys, personalized rocking chairs and Stetson hats, and it was announced that the two Texas flags flown at the State Capitol in Austin would be framed and given to the two players.

On April 22, Collin McHugh started and earned his first major league victory in his Astros debut, allowing three hits over 6 2/3 shutout innings of the Seattle Mariners, and registered 12 strikeouts. This was his first career double-digit strikeout game and permanently remained his career high. During parts of two seasons prior to arriving in Houston, McHugh had been charged an 8.94 earned run average (ERA) and an 0–8 win–loss record (W–L) over 15 appearances. Meanwhile, as of this season, he retained his rookie status.

In his second start on April 27, McHugh garnered another victory while also going within one out of earning his first complete game. He surrendered one run on two hits and three walks, in a 5–1 victory over the Oakland Athletics. This was the right-hander's season high in innings and career high until tossing his first complete game on May 30, 2016.

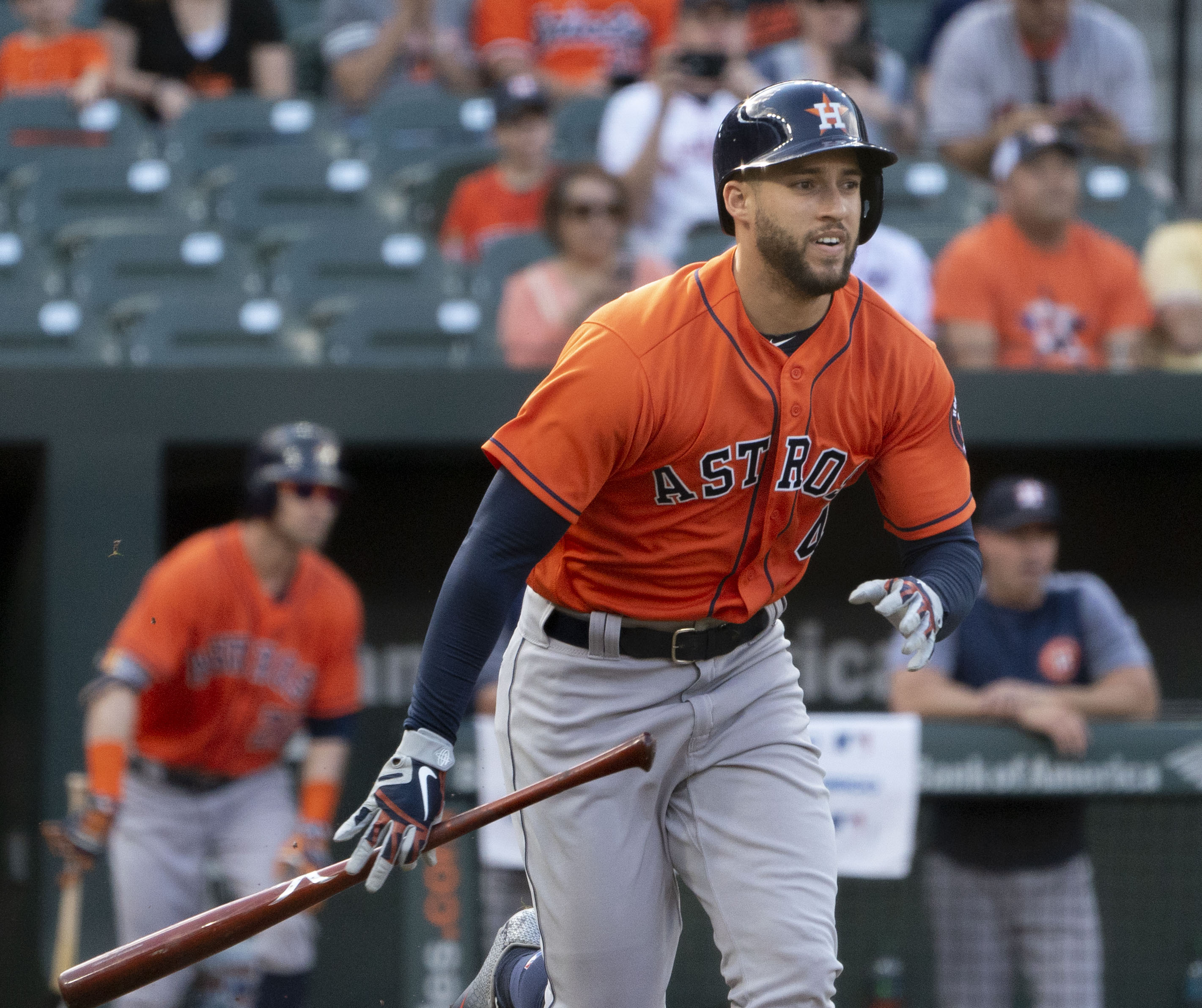
During a seven-game span from May 21–29, 2014, right fielder George Springer hit seven home runs.

On May 8, rookie right fielder George Springer blasted his first major league home run at Comerica Park to lead a 6–2 win over the Detroit Tigers

From May 12—29, George Springer constructed a consecutive on-base streak of 15. From May 10–29, he connected for nine home runs with 22 runs batted in (RBI) for a slash line of .333 / .450 / .818 / 1.268 on-base plus slugging percentage (OPS). He also had an 11-game hitting streak, and hit seven of the home runs over a seven-game span from May 21–29. (Note: Springer became the second rookie in major league history to hit seven home runs in a seven-game span, joining Rudy York of the Detroit Tigers, who did it from August 22—27, 1937.) On May 26, Springer established new career-bests with four hits and five runs scored to lead a 9–2 win over the Kansas City Royals. One of the four hits was Springer's fourth home run in three games, helping inject new life into a club whose record stood at 17–32. For his first full month in the major leagues, Springer batted .294 with 10 home runs, 25 RBI, 22 runs scored, and a .647 slugging percentage. He was named AL Rookie of the Month, Houston's first recipient since becoming an AL club, and first since Hunter Pence in May 2007.

==== June—July ====
The Astros signed Jon Singleton on June 2 to a 5-year, $10 million contract. At the time, this was the largest contract ever agreed to with a player who had yet to make his major league debut. A key piece in the Hunter Pence trade, on June 3, Singleton made his major league debut, and launched a home run to lead a 7–2 win over the Los Angeles Angels.

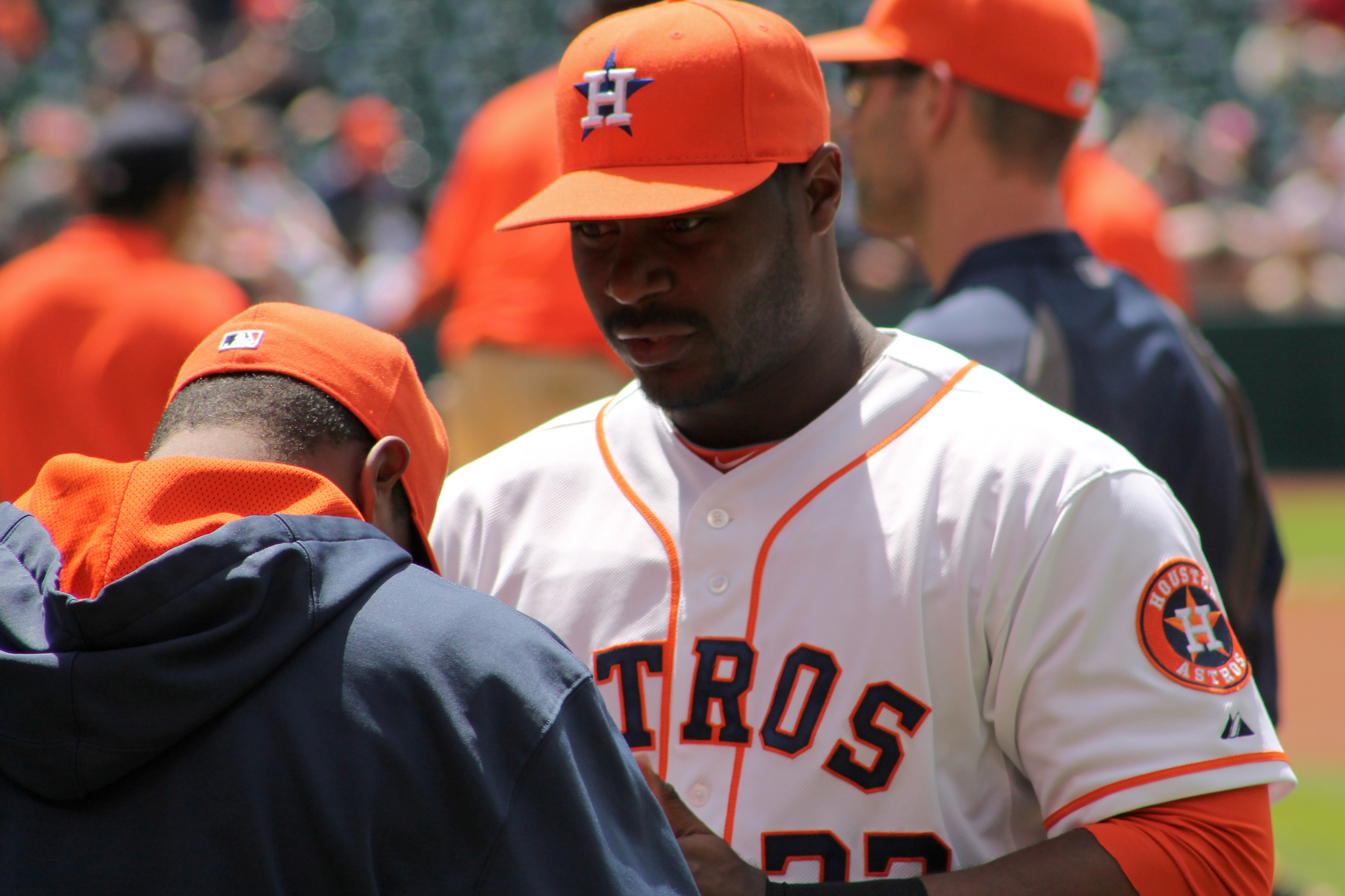
First baseman Chris Carter

On June 8, the Astros connected for two grand slams in the same game for the second time in club history, by Jon Singleton, and Chris Carter, the first in the Major Leagues for both players. In addition to Carter and Singleton, Dexter Fowler (4) and Springer (12) went deep in a 14–5 rout of the Minnesota Twins. Singleton also thumped his first Major League double, and Jose Altuve pilfered two bases. Carter stroked his grand slam in the seventh inning of Brian Duensing, while Singleton followed in the ninth off Glen Perkins. The first game with two grand slams for Houston were hit by Jimmy Wynn and Denis Menke on July 30, 1969, which they hit during the same inning. (Note: The next contest in which the Astros hit two grand slams in the same game occurred on April 12, 2019.)

George Springer was featured on the June 25 cover of Sports Illustrated, including a prediction of Houston's 2017 World Series championship. At the time, Springer had 14 home runs and 59 RBI, Jose Altuve was leading the major leagues in hits, while the Astros had occupied last place in the AL West with a 33–45 (.423) record.

Over a 52-game span from July 4 through September 5, Chris Carter hammered 23 home run, 55 runs batted in (RBI), and hit for a .687 slugging percentage—all leading the major leagues in that span. He also hit .296.

Left-hander Dallas Keuchel posted a 9–5 win–loss record with a 3.20 earned run average (ERA) at the All-Star break, and was named a finalist for the final AL roster spot in the MLB All-Star Game.

Beginning July 19, Springer was out of action due to a strained left quadriceps, and hence, was placed on the 15-day disabled list (DL). He appeared to be progressing, even going through a minor league rehabilitation stint in August, but it was announced on September 16 that he would miss the rest of the season, playing in a total of 78 games.

==== August ====
On August 2, Jon Singleton connected for an inside-the-park home run, driving in three runners, off Brett Cecil of the Toronto Blue Jays. This was the rookie's 10th home run of the season.

On August 17, Jose Altuve slugged his first career grand slam, off right-hander Joe Kelly, and over the Green Monster at Fenway Park. Altuve's home run (6), one of his four hits, capped a six-run second inning as the Astros routed the Red Sox, 8 to 2. Collin McHugh (6–9) scattered seven hits and four walks while whiffing six to earn the victory. Dexter Fowler (7) and Jon Singleton (11) also homered. It was the seventh four-hit game of Altuve's career.

On August 30, Scott Feldman (8–10) tossed his second career shutout, a three-hitter to lead a 2–0 win over the Texas Rangers. The three-hitter matched a career-best, which Feldman tossed during his last shutout the season prior. The Astros scored twice in the seventh inning, keyed by Carlos Corporán's double to put runners at second and third. Jake Marisnick followed with an RBI infield single, and Corporán scored on a throwing error by reliever Phil Klein (0–2).

Rookie right-hander Collin McHugh went undefeated in six August starts, yielding a .191 earned run average (ERA) over 37 2/3 innings pitched (IP). McHugh surrendered one home run and six walks.

==== September ====
On September 1, the Astros terminated manager Bo Porter and bench coach Dave Trembley as the team's record stood at 59–79 (.428). Porter was replaced on an interim basis by Tom Lawless, who had been managing the Astros' Triple-A affiliate, the Oklahoma City RedHawks. General manager Jeff Luhnow cited disagreements with Porter as the reason for his dismissal, rather than the team's on-field performance. Luhnow had "recognize[d] that our win-loss record is largely a product of an organizational strategy for which I am responsible. Rather, I made this decision because I believe we need a new direction in our clubhouse."

On September 16, Jose Altuve recorded his 211th hit of the season to pass the record established by Craig Biggio in 1998. Altuve singled up the middle in the seventh inning in a 4–2 loss to the Cleveland Indians.

Over four September outings, all starts, Collin McHugh won each, yielding a 1.59 ERA and 0.565 walks plus hits per inning pitched (WHIP) over 28 2/3 IP, McHugh won his final seven decisions of the season, along with a 2.12 ERA for the second half of the season. McHugh was named AL Rookie of the Month for September, joining Springer in May earlier in the season as Astros to win the award. It was the first time Astros rookies won more than once during the same season. Additionally, McHugh was the first Astros pitcher to win Rookie of the Month since Kirk Saarloos in July of 2002, and third overall, along with Roy Oswalt.

==== Performance overview ====
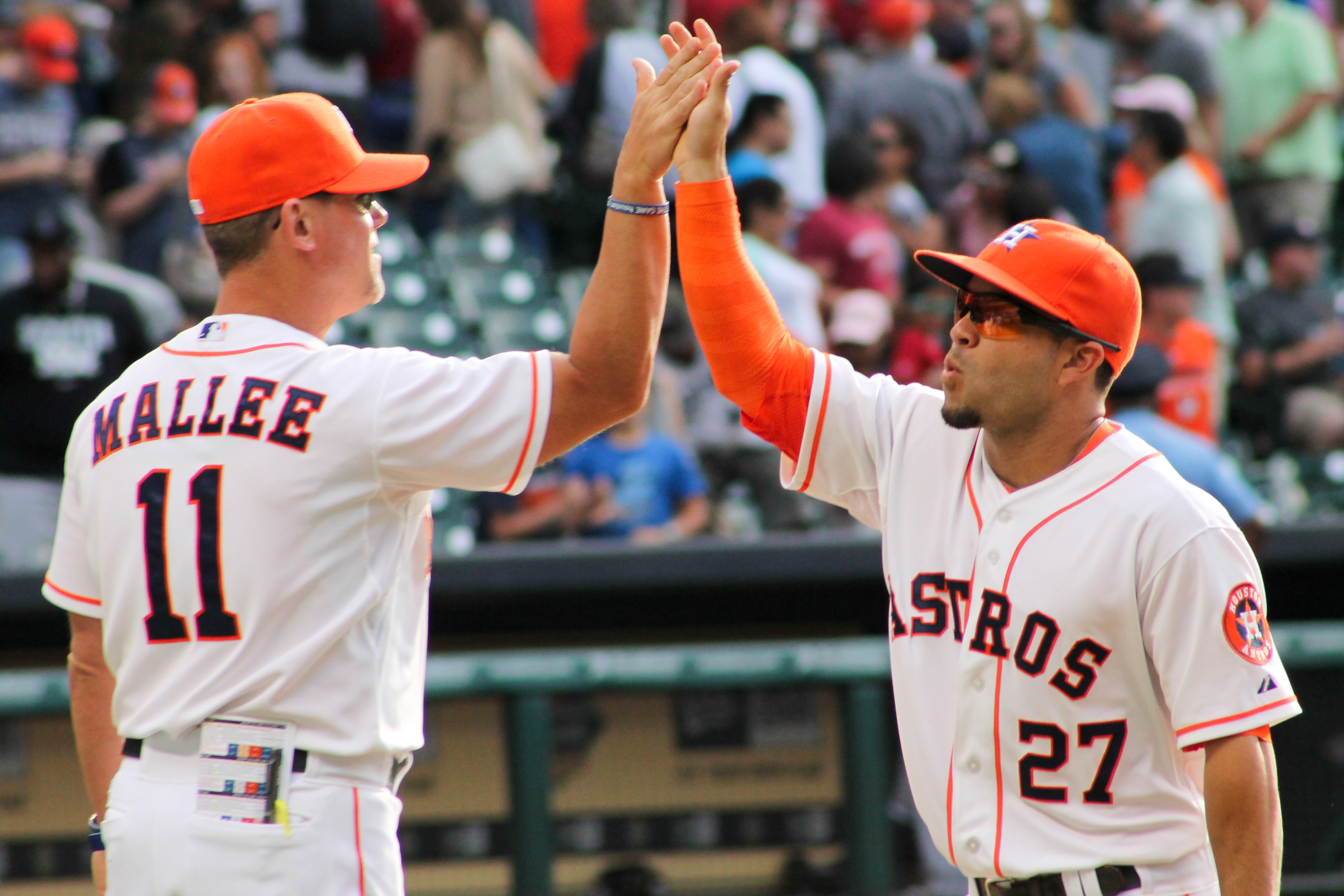
Coach John Mallee and second baseman Jose Altuve

Following three consecutive 100-loss seasons—the first 100-loss seasons in franchise history—the Astros rebounded to conclude 2014 with a 70–92 record, raising by 19 victories from a 51–111 (.315) showing in 2013, to reverse multiple bleak trends, including four continuous seasons each with a progressively worse record than the preceding year, and three consecutive finalizations in last place. Further, the 2014 season was the final of 9 consecutive missing the playoffs since 2005, their first-ever World Series appearance. The Astros avoided another losing season until the 60-game 2020 gamut. (Note: The 2020 regular season was shortened to 60 games as a response to the COVID-19 pandemic, when the Astros finished 29–31 (.483).) As of 2025, the 2014 season was the final in which Houston completed lower than in third place, and the final unshortened season with fewer than 84 victories.

Jose Altuve led the major leagues with a .341 batting average to became Houston's first ever batting champion, in hits (225), and in multi-hits games, and the AL with 56 stolen bases. Altuve became the second Astro to lead the league in hits, joining José Cruz in 1983 in this achievement. Also a Silver Slugger winner for the first time, Altuve became the first Astro to win since outfielder Carlos Lee in 2007, and joined Craig Biggio as the second Houston Astros second baseman (1994 to 1997). Additionally, Altuve became the first Astro to win the Luis Aparicio Award.

Southpaw Dallas Keuchel achieved a breakout campaign, both as the pitcher and as the fielder. He pitched 200 innings and was seventh in the AL in earned run average (2.93 ERA), the league leader in complete games (five), and attained a 12–9 win–loss record (W–L). He won his first Gold Glove Award, the first Astros hurler since Bobby Shantz in the Colt .45s inaugural season of 1962. Keuchel also became the third Astro to win the Fielding Bible Award, joining shortstop Adam Everett in 2006 and center fielder Michael Bourn in 2010.

Chris Carter, meanwhile, became the 12th player in club history to hit two grand slams in one season—tying a then-club record—and also tied for second in the majors with 37 home runs. Rookie starter Collin McHugh, a waiver acquisition, posted an 11-9 W–L with a 2.74 ERA over 25 starts (falling 7 1/3 innings short of qualifying for the ERA title).

=== League standings ===
==== American League West ====
AL West
Team	W	L	Pct.	GB	Home	Road
Los Angeles Angels	98	64	.605	—	52‍–‍29	46‍–‍35
Oakland Athletics	88	74	.543	10	48‍–‍33	40‍–‍41
Seattle Mariners	87	75	.537	11	41‍–‍40	46‍–‍35
Houston Astros	70	92	.432	28	38‍–‍43	32‍–‍49
Texas Rangers	67	95	.414	31	33‍–‍48	34‍–‍47

==== American League Wild Card ====
AL Wild Card standings

Division leaders
Team	W	L	Pct.
Los Angeles Angels	98	64	.605
Baltimore Orioles	96	66	.593
Detroit Tigers	90	72	.556

Wild Card teams (Top 2 teams qualify for postseason)
Team	W	L	Pct.	GB
Kansas City Royals	89	73	.549	+1
Oakland Athletics	88	74	.543	—
Seattle Mariners	87	75	.537	1
Cleveland Indians	85	77	.525	3
New York Yankees	84	78	.519	4
Toronto Blue Jays	83	79	.512	5
Tampa Bay Rays	77	85	.475	11
Chicago White Sox	73	89	.451	15
Boston Red Sox	71	91	.438	17
Houston Astros	70	92	.432	18
Minnesota Twins	70	92	.432	18
Texas Rangers	67	95	.414	21

==== Record versus opponents ====
American League

2014 American League record Source: MLB Standings Grid – 2014
Team	BAL	BOS	CWS	CLE	DET	HOU	KC	LAA	MIN	NYY	OAK	SEA	TB	TEX	TOR	NL
Baltimore	—	11–8	5–1	3–4	1–5	4–3	3–4	4–2	4–3	13–6	2–4	5–2	12–7	6–1	11–8	12–8
Boston	8–11	—	4–3	2–5	1–5	4–3	6–1	2–5	4–2	7–12	3–4	1–5	9–10	4–2	7–12	9–11
Chicago	1–5	3–4	—	9–10	9–10	3–3	6–13	1–5	9–10	2–5	4–3	3–4	5–2	2–4	5–2	11–9
Cleveland	4–3	5–2	10–9	—	8–11	5–2	10–9	2–5	11–8	4–3	2–4	2–4	4–2	6–1	2–4	10–10
Detroit	5–1	5–1	10–9	11–8	—	4–3	13–6	3–4	9–10	3–4	5–2	2–4	3–4	4–3	1–5	12–8
Houston	3–4	3–4	3–3	2–5	3–4	—	3–3	7–12	3–3	4–2	8–11	9–10	2–5	11–8	4–3	5–15
Kansas City	4–3	1–6	13–6	9–10	6–13	3–3	—	3–3	11–8	4–3	5–2	2–5	4–2	5–1	4–3	15–5
Los Angeles	2–4	5–2	5–1	5–2	4–3	12–7	3–3	—	7–0	2–4	10–9	7–12	5–2	14–5	5–2	12–8
Minnesota	3–4	2–4	10–9	8–11	10–9	3–3	8–11	0–7	—	3–4	1–6	5–2	2–4	2–5	4–2	9–11
New York	6–13	12–7	5–2	3–4	4–3	2–4	3–4	4–2	4–3	—	2–4	3–3	8–11	4–3	11–8	13–7
Oakland	4–2	4–3	3–4	4–2	2–5	11–8	2–5	9–10	6–1	4–2	—	9–10	4–2	9–10	4–3	13–7
Seattle	2–5	5–1	4–3	4–2	4–2	10–9	5–2	12–7	2–5	3–3	10–9	—	4–3	9–10	4–3	9–11
Tampa Bay	7–12	10–9	2–5	2–4	4–3	5–2	2–4	2–5	4–2	11–8	2–4	3–4	—	5–2	8–11	10–10
Texas	1–6	2–4	4–2	1–6	3–4	8–11	1–5	5–14	5–2	3–4	10–9	10–9	2–5	—	2–4	10–10
Toronto	8–11	12–7	2–5	4–2	5–1	3–4	3–4	2–5	2–4	8–11	3–4	3–4	11–8	4–2	—	13–7

== Game log ==
2014 Game Log: 70–92 (Home: 38–43; Away: 32–49)
April: 9–19 (Home: 5–11; Away: 4–8 )

#	Date	Opponent	Score	Win	Loss	Save	Attendance	Record
1	April 1	Yankees	6–2	**Feldman** (1–0)	Sabathia (0–1)		42,117	1–0
2	April 2	Yankees	3–1	**Cosart** (1–0)	Kuroda (0–1)	**Fields** (1)	23,145	2–0
3	April 3	Yankees	2–4	Nova (1–0)	**Oberholtzer** (0–1)	Robertson (1)	26,348	2–1
4	April 4	Angels	1–11	Richards (1–0)	**Harrell** (0–1)		15,611	2–2
5	April 5	Angels	1–5	Skaggs (1–0)	**Keuchel** (0–1)		28,515	2–3
6	April 6	Angels	7–4	**Feldman** (2–0)	Weaver (0–2)	**Qualls** (1)	14,786	3–3
7	April 7	Angels	1–9	Wilson (1–0)	**Cosart** (1–1)		17,936	3–4
8	April 8	@ Blue Jays	2–5	Buehrle (2–0)	**Oberholtzer** (0–2)	Santos (3)	13,123	3–5
9	April 9	@ Blue Jays	3–7	Morrow (1–1)	**Harrell** (0–2)		13,569	3–6
10	April 10	@ Blue Jays	6–4	**Keuchel** (1–1)	Dickey (1–2)	**Bass** (1)	15,788	4–6
11	April 11	@ Rangers	0–1 (10)	Frasor (1–0)	**Peacock** (0–1)		36,150	4–7
12	April 12	@ Rangers	6–5 (10)	**Chapman** (1–0)	Soria (1–1)	**Bass** (2)	42,577	5–7
13	April 13	@ Rangers	0–1	Pérez (2–0)	**Oberholtzer** (0–3)	Ogando (1)	38,698	5–8
14	April 15	Royals	2–4	Ventura (1–0)	**Harrell** (0–3)	Holland (4)	29,778	5–9
15	April 16	Royals	4–6 (11)	Duffy (1–0)	**Williams** (0–1)	Holland (5)	23,043	5–10
16	April 17	Royals	1–5	Shields (1–2)	**Feldman** (2–1)		26,333	5–11
17	April 18	@ Athletics	3–11	Gray (3–0)	**Cosart** (1–2)		18,234	5–12
18	April 19	@ Athletics	3–4	Otero (3–0)	**Qualls** (0–1)		33,166	5–13
19	April 20	@ Athletics	1–4	Chavez (1–0)	**Peacock** (0–2)	Gregerson (3)	16,382	5–14
20	April 21	@ Mariners	7–2	**Keuchel** (2–1)	Hernández (3–1)		14,630	6–14
21	April 22	@ Mariners	5–2	**McHugh** (1–0)	Ramírez (1–3)	**Fields** (2)	10,466	7–14
22	April 23	@ Mariners	3–5	Rodney (1–1)	**Fields** (0–1)		13,739	7–15
23	April 24	Athletics	1–10	Kazmir (3–0)	**Oberholtzer** (0–4)		19,987	7–16
24	April 25	Athletics	5–12	Gregerson (1–1)	**Fields** (0–2)		17,708	7–17
25	April 26	Athletics	7–6	**Williams** (1–1)	Doolittle (0–2)	**Valdés** (1)	17,850	8–17
26	April 27	Athletics	5–1	**McHugh** (2–0)	Milone (0–2)		18,935	9–17
27	April 29	Nationals	3–4	Clippard (2–2)	**Fields** (0–3)	Soriano (5)	23,394	9–18
28	April 30	Nationals	0–7	Zimmermann (2–1)	**Oberholtzer** (0–5)		25,172	9–19

May: 15–14 (Home: 7–5; Away: 8–9 )

#	Date	Opponent	Score	Win	Loss	Save	Attendance	Record
29	May 2	Mariners	5–4 (11)	**Bass** (1–0)	Furbush (0–3)		15,771	10–19
30	May 3	Mariners	8–9	Iwakuma (1–0)	**Keuchel** (2–2)	Rodney (7)	15,798	10–20
31	May 4	Mariners	7–8	Maurer (1–0)	**McHugh** (2–1)	Farquhar (1)	24,996	10–21
32	May 5	@ Tigers	0–2	Scherzer (4–1)	**Cosart** (1–3)	Nathan (6)	26,457	10–22
33	May 6	@ Tigers	4–11	Ray (1–0)	**Oberholtzer** (0–6)		27,939	10–23
34	May 7	@ Tigers	2–3	Porcello (5–1)	**Peacock** (0–3)	Nathan (7)	26,207	10–24
35	May 8	@ Tigers	6–2	**Keuchel** (3–2)	Smyly (2–2)		35,643	11–24
36	May 9	@ Orioles	3–4	Chen (4–2)	**Williams** (1–2)	Hunter (11)	28,875	11–25
37	May 10	@ Orioles	4–5 (10)	Webb (2–0)	**Clemens** (0–1)		26,264	11–26
38	May 11	@ Orioles	5–2	**Cosart** (2–3)	Tillman (3–2)	**Qualls** (2)	45,944	12–26
39	May 12	Rangers	0–4	Lewis (3–2)	**Peacock** (0–4)		14,617	12–27
40	May 13	Rangers	8–0	**Keuchel** (4–2)	Harrison (1–1)		14,028	13–27
41	May 14	Rangers	5–4	**Qualls** (1–1)	Martinez (0–1)		17,783	14–27
42	May 16	White Sox	2–7	Quintana (2–3)	**McHugh** (2–2)		17,529	14–28
43	May 17	White Sox	6–5	**Cosart** (3–3)	Noesí (0–4)	**Qualls** (3)	20,612	15–28
44	May 18	White Sox	8–2	**Peacock** (1–4)	Danks (3–4)		21,532	16–28
45	May 19	@ Angels	5–2	**Keuchel** (5–2)	Richards (4–1)		33,150	17–28
46	May 20	@ Angels	3–9	Skaggs (4–1)	**Feldman** (2–2)		30,150	17–29
47	May 21	@ Angels	1–2	Weaver (5–3)	**McHugh** (2–3)		40,112	17–30
48	May 22	@ Mariners	1–3	Leone (1–0)	**Cosart** (3–4)	Rodney (12)	13,836	17–31
49	May 23	@ Mariners	1–5	Hernández (6–1)	**Owens** (0–1)		21,192	17–32
50	May 24	@ Mariners	9–4	**Oberholtzer** (1–6)	Maurer (1–3)		21,585	18–32
51	May 25	@ Mariners	4–1	**Keuchel** (6–2)	Iwakuma (3–1)		26,839	19–32
52	May 26	@ Royals	9–2	**Feldman** (3–2)	Ventura (2–5)		32,070	20–32
53	May 27	@ Royals	3–0	**McHugh** (3–3)	Guthrie (2–4)		17,826	21–32
54	May 28	@ Royals	9–3	**Cosart** (4–4)	Duffy (2–5)		16,220	22–32
55	May 29	Orioles	3–1	**Fields** (1–3)	Guilmet (0–1)	**Qualls** (4)	22,884	23–32
56	May 30	Orioles	2–1	**Oberholtzer** (2–6)	González (3–4)	**Qualls** (5)	38,482	24–32
57	May 31	Orioles	1–4	Tillman (5–2)	**Keuchel** (6–3)	Britton (4)	29,619	24–33

June: 12–15 (Home: 8–8; Away: 4–7 )

#	Date	Opponent	Score	Win	Loss	Save	Attendance	Record
58	June 1	Orioles	4–9	Chen (6–2)	**Feldman** (3–3)		17,022	24–34
59	June 3	Angels	7–2	**McHugh** (4–3)	Wilson (6–5)		23,219	25–34
60	June 4	Angels	0–4	Richards (5–2)	**Cosart** (4–5)		23,902	25–35
61	June 5	Angels	8–5	**Skaggs** (4–4)	Peacock (2–4)	**Qualls** (6)	24,672	26–35
62	June 6	@ Twins	5–4	**Keuchel** (7–3)	Hughes (6–2)	**Qualls** (7)	29,448	27–35
63	June 7	@ Twins	0–8	Gibson (5–5)	**Feldman** (3–4)		27,732	27–36
64	June 8	@ Twins	14–5	**Downs** (1–0)	Deduno (2–4)		31,576	28–36
65	June 9	@ Diamondbacks	4–3	**Cosart** (5–5)	Collmenter (4–3)	**Qualls** (8)	18,805	29–36
66	June 10	@ Diamondbacks	1–4	Arroyo (6–4)	**Fields** (1–4)	Reed (16)	17,667	29–37
67	June 11	Diamondbacks	5–1	**Keuchel** (8–3)	McCarthy (1–9)		24,319	30–37
68	June 12	Diamondbacks	5–4 (10)	**Sipp** (1–0)	Putz (1–1)		33,475	31–37
69	June 13	Rays	1–6	Cobb (2–4)	**McHugh** (4–4)		26,829	31–38
70	June 14	Rays	7–3	**Cosart** (6–5)	Archer (3–4)		26,264	32–38
71	June 15	Rays	3–4	Price (5–6)	**Williams** (1–3)	McGee (1)	25,526	32–39
72	June 17	@ Nationals	5–6	Roark (6–4)	**Keuchel** (8–4)	Soriano (14)	29,960	32–40
73	June 18	@ Nationals	5–6	Barrett (3–0)	**Downs** (1–1)	Soriano (15)	25,453	32–41
74	June 19	@ Rays	0–5	Archer (4–4)	**McHugh** (4–5)		10,880	32–42
75	June 20	@ Rays	3–1	**Cosart** (7–5)	Price (5–7)	**Qualls** (9)	13,861	33–42
76	June 21	@ Rays	0–8	Odorizzi (3–7)	**Buchanan** (0–1)		17,551	33–43
77	June 22	@ Rays	2–5	Oviedo (3–2)	**Keuchel** (8–5)	Peralta (1)	18,841	33–44
78	June 24	Braves	2–3	Harang (6–6)	**Feldman** (3–5)	Kimbrel (22)	18,912	33–45
79	June 25	Braves	0–4	Wood (6–6)	**McHugh** (4–6)		20,559	33–46
80	June 26	Braves	6–1	**Cosart** (8–5)	Minor (2–5)		24,474	34–46
81	June 27	Tigers	4–3 (11)	**Buchanan** (1–1)	Hardy (0–1)		22,386	35–46
82	June 28	Tigers	3–4	Coke (1–1)	**Williams** (1–4)	Nathan (17)	25,788	35–47
83	June 29	Tigers	6–4	**Feldman** (4–5)	Smyly (4–7)	**Sipp** (1)	22,478	36–47
84	June 30	Mariners	4–10	Walker (1–0)	**McHugh** (4–7)	Wilhelmsen (1)	17,340	36–48

July: 8–17 (Home: 3–9; Away: 5–8 )

#	Date	Opponent	Score	Win	Loss	Save	Attendance	Record
85	July 1	Mariners	2–13	Iwakuma (6–4)	**Cosart** (8–6)		17,504	36–49
86	July 2	Mariners	2–5	Young (8–4)	**Peacock** (2–5)	Rodney (24)	17,209	36–50
87	July 3	@ Angels	2–5	Shoemaker (6–2)	**Oberholtzer** (2–7)	Smith (10)	37,625	36–51
88	July 4	@ Angels	6–7	Smith (3–0)	**Sipp** (1–1)		43,557	36–52
89	July 5	@ Angels	5–11	Roth (1–0)	**Bass** (1–1)		40,479	36–53
90	July 6	@ Angels	1–6	Richards (10–2)	**McHugh** (4–8)		33,552	36–54
91	July 7	@ Rangers	12–7	**Cosart** (9–6)	Mikolas (0–1)		31,010	37–54
92	July 8	@ Rangers	8–3	**Peacock** (3–5)	Irwin (0–1)		32,608	38–54
93	July 9	@ Rangers	8–4	**Keuchel** (9–5)	Darvish (8–5)		31,161	39–54
94	July 11	Red Sox	3–8	Lackey (10–6)	**Feldman** (4–6)		27,264	39–55
95	July 12	Red Sox	3–2	**Fields** (2–4)	Peavy (1–8)	**Qualls** (10)	26,322	40–55
96	July 13	Red Sox	0–11	Buchholz (4–5)	**Peacock** (3–6)		20,681	40–56
**All–Star Break (July 14–17)**
97	July 18	@ White Sox	2–3	Webb (5–2)	**Feldman** (4–7)	Putnam (2)	28,777	40–57
98	July 19	@ White Sox	3–4	Noesí (4–7)	**Keuchel** (9–6)	Putnam (2)	28,210	40–58
99	July 20	@ White Sox	11–7	**Sipp** (2–1)	Webb (5–3)		26,256	41–58
100	July 22	@ Athletics	3–2 (12)	**Downs** (2–1)	Abad (2–4)	**Qualls** (11)	22,908	42–58
101	July 23	@ Athletics	7–9	Chavez (8–6)	**Peacock** (3–7)	Doolittle (15)	28,310	42–59
102	July 24	@ Athletics	1–13	Samardzija (4–8)	**Feldman** (4–8)		22,759	42–60
103	July 25	Marlins	0–2	Hand (2–2)	**Keuchel** (9–7)	Cishek (25)	23,132	42–61
104	July 26	Marlins	3–7	Koehler (7–7)	**Cosart** (9–7)		28,968	42–62
105	July 27	Marlins	2–4	Turner (4–6)	**McHugh** (4–9)	Cishek (26)	17,858	42–63
106	July 28	Athletics	7–3	**Oberholtzer** (3–7)	Chavez (8–7)		18,259	43–63
107	July 29	Athletics	4–7	Scribner (1–0)	**Qualls** (1–2)	Doolittle (16)	16,940	43–64
108	July 30	Athletics	8–1	**Keuchel** (10–7)	Hammel (8–9)		17,637	44–64
109	July 31	Blue Jays	5–6	Sanchez (2–0)	**Qualls** (1–3)	Janssen (18)	17,423	44–65

August: 15–14 (Home: 10–6; Away: 5–8 )

#	Date	Opponent	Score	Win	Loss	Save	Attendance	Record
110	August 1	Blue Jays	3–1	**Veras** (1–0)	Loup (3–3)	**Qualls** (12)	19,576	45–65
111	August 2	Blue Jays	8–2	**Oberholtzer** (4–7)	Dickey (9–11)		19,946	46–65
112	August 3	Blue Jays	6–1	**Feldman** (5–8)	Stroman (7–3)		19,932	47–65
113	August 5	@ Phillies	1–2 (15)	Neris (1–0)	**Buchanan** (1–2)		28,336	47–66
114	August 6	@ Phillies	3–10	Buchanan (6–5)	**Peacock** (3–8)		26,691	47–67
115	August 7	@ Phillies	5–6	Hollands (2–1)	**Sipp** (2–2)	Papelbon (27)	26,609	47–68
116	August 8	Rangers	4–3	**Veras** (2-0)	Cotts (2-6)	**Qualls** (13)	24,256	48–68
117	August 9	Rangers	8–3	**Feldman** (6-8)	Darvish (10-7)		24,019	49–68
118	August 10	Rangers	2–6	Martinez (2-8)	**Keuchel** (10-8)		19,239	49–69
119	August 11	Twins	2–4	Duensing (3-2)	**Fields** (2-5)	Perkins (29)	15,569	49–70
120	August 12	Twins	10–4	**McHugh** (5-9)	Pino (1-5)		17,490	50–70
121	August 13	Twins	1–3	Gibson (11-9)	**Oberholtzer** (4-8)	Perkins (30)	16,480	50–71
122	August 14	@ Red Sox	4–9	Webster (3-1)	**Feldman** (6-9)		38,065	50–72
123	August 15	@ Red Sox	5–3 (10)	**Sipp** (3-2)	Breslow (2-4)		37,016	51–72
124	August 16	@ Red Sox	7–10	Wilson (1-0)	**Fields** (2-6)		37,652	51–73
125	August 17	@ Red Sox	8–1	**McHugh** (6-9)	Kelly (2-3)		36,717	52–73
126	August 19	@ Yankees	7–4	**Fields** (3-6)	Robertson (1-4)	**Qualls** (14)	40,015	53–73
127	August 20	@ Yankees	5–2	**Feldman** (7-9)	Huff (2-1)	**Veras** (1)	42,102	54–73
128	August 21	@ Yankees	0–3	McCarthy (8-12)	**Keuchel** (10-9)		41,767	54–74
129	August 22	@ Indians	5–1	**Sipp** (4-2)	Allen (4-3)		18,743	55–74
130	August 23	@ Indians	2–3	Allen (5-3)	**Buchanan** (1-3)		20,785	55–75
131	August 24	@ Indians	1–3	Bauer (5-7)	**Oberholtzer** (4-9)	Allen (17)	17,123	55–76
132	August 25	Athletics	2–8	Samardziji (4-3)	**Feldman** (7-10)		14,094	55–77
133	August 26	Athletics	4–2	**Fields** (4-6)	Gregerson (3-3)	**Qualls** (15)	17,345	56–77
134	August 27	Athletics	4–5	Otero (8-1)	**Qualls** (1-4)	O'Flaherty (1)	14,791	56–78
135	August 28	Rangers	4–2	**McHugh** (7-9)	Mendez (0-1)	**Sipp** (2)	16,399	57–78
136	August 29	Rangers	6–13	Baker (3-3)	**Oberholtzer** (4-10)		18,931	57–79
137	August 30	Rangers	2–0	**Feldman** (8-10)	Klein (0-2)		24,771	58–79
138	August 31	Rangers	3–2	**Veras** (3-0)	Cotts (2-8)	**Qualls** (16)	19,024	59–79

September: 11–13 (Home: 5–4; Away: 6–9 )

#	Date	Opponent	Score	Win	Loss	Save	Attendance	Record
139	September 2	Angels	8–3	**Peacock** (4-8)	Wilson (10-9)		16,131	60–79
140	September 3	Angels	4–1	**McHugh** (8-9)	Weaver (15-8)	**Qualls** (17)	16,949	61–79
141	September 5	@ Athletics	4–3	**Oberholtzer** (5-10)	Samardzija (4-5)	**Sipp** (3)	21,130	62–79
142	September 6	@ Athletics	3–4	Gregerson (4-3)	**Qualls** (1-5)		28,668	62–80
143	September 7	@ Athletics	4–3	**Veras** (4-0)	Cook (1-3)	**Fields** (3)	25,533	63–80
144	September 8	@ Mariners	1–4	Farquhar (3-1)	**Foltynewicz** (0-1)	Rodney (44)	15,617	63–81
145	September 9	@ Mariners	2–1	**McHugh** (9-9)	Medina (4-3)	**Fields** (4)	11,345	64–81
146	September 10	@ Mariners	5–2	**Tropeano** (1-0)	Iwakuma (14-7)	**Sipp** (4)	16,931	65–81
147	September 12	@ Angels	3–11	Wilson (12-9)	**Oberholtzer** (5-11)		33,339	65–82
148	September 13	@ Angels	2–5	Weaver (17-8)	**Feldman** (8-11)	Street (38)	38,041	65–83
149	September 14	@ Angels	6–1	**Keuchel** (11-9)	Santiago (5-8)		35,364	66–83
150	September 15	Indians	3–1	**McHugh** (10-9)	McAllister (3-7)	**Qualls** (18)	17,403	67–83
151	September 16	Indians	2–4	Kluber (16-9)	**Tropeano** (1-1)	Allen (22)	18,381	67–84
152	September 17	Indians	0–2	Carrasco (8-5)	**Oberholtzer** (5-12)		18,474	67–85
153	September 18	Indians	1–2 (13)	Crockett (4-0)	**Deduno** (2-6)	Allen (23)	16,417	67–86
154	September 19	Mariners	5–10	Walker (2-2)	**Peacock** (4-9)		27,568	67–87
155	September 20	Mariners	10–1	**Keuchel** (12-9)	Young (12-9)		36,525	68–87
156	September 21	Mariners	8–3	**McHugh** (11-9)	Iwakuma (14-9)		31,466	69–87
157	September 22	@ Rangers	3–4	Holland (2-0)	**Tropeano** (1-2)	Feliz (12)	28,717	69–88
158	September 23	@ Rangers	1–2	Martinez (5-11)	**Oberholtzer** (5-13)	Cotts (2)	29,794	69–89
159	September 24	@ Rangers	1–5	Bonilla (3-0)	**Feldman** (8-12)		28,003	69–90
160	September 26	@ Mets	3–1	**Chapman** (2-0)	Torres (8-6)	**Qualls** (19)	27,729	70–90
161	September 27	@ Mets	1–2	Sipp (4-3)	**Mejía** (6-6)		34,866	70–91
162	September 28	@ Mets	3–8	Colón (15–13)	**Tropeano** (1–3)		34,897	70–92

Legend: = Win = Loss = Postponement
Bold = Astros team member

== Roster ==
2014 Houston Astros
Roster
Pitchers: 37 Matt Albers; 45 Anthony Bass; 58 Jake Buchanan; 66 Kevin Chapman; 68 José Cisnero; 56 Paul Clemens; 48 Jarred Cosart; 67 Jorge de León; 44 Samuel Deduno; 38 Darin Downs; 44 Kyle Farnsworth; 46 Scott Feldman; 35 Josh Fields; 48 Michael Foltynewicz; 64 Lucas Harrell; 60 Dallas Keuchel; 54 David Martínez; 31 Collin McHugh; 39 Brett Oberholtzer; 99 Rudy Owens; 41 Brad Peacock; 50 Chad Qualls; 29 Tony Sipp; 63 Nick Tropeano; 44 Raúl Valdés; 55 José Veras; 36 Jerome Williams; 61 Josh Zeid	Catchers: 15 Jason Castro; 22 Carlos Corporán; 12 Max Stassi; Infielders: 27 Jose Altuve; 23 Chris Carter; 30 Matt Dominguez; 9 Marwin González; 14 Jesús Guzmán; 18 Marc Krauss; 3 Gregorio Petit; 28 Jon Singleton; 6,2 Jonathan Villar	Outfielders: 21 Dexter Fowler; 19 Robbie Grossman; 6 Enrique Hernández; 28,0 L. J. Hoes; 6 Jake Marisnick; 8 Alex Presley; 13 Domingo Santana; 4 George Springer	Manager: 1 Tom Lawless; 16 Bo Porter; Coaches: 52 Craig Bjornson (bullpen); 85 Javier Bracamonte (bullpen catcher); 10 Tarrik Brock (first base); 51 Ralph Dickenson (assistant hitting); 36 Adam Everett (bench); 20 Pat Listach (third base); 11 John Mallee (hitting); 53 Brent Strom (pitching); 47 Dave Trembley (bench)

== Player statistics ==
Table legend
League leader (Bold: MLB leader)	Team leader	*	Left-handed batter or pitcher
League top ten	Leader in appearances at position	#	Switch hitter

=== Batting ===
Abbreviations key

- G — games played
- AB — at bats
- R — runs
- H — hits
- 2B — doubles
- 3B — triples
- HR — home runs
- RBI — runs batted in
- SB — stolen bases
- BB — bases on balls
- AVG — batting average
- OBP — on-base percentage
- SLG — slugging percentage
- TB — total bases

Individual batting results
Player	G	AB	R	H	2B	3B	HR	RBI	BB	AVG	SB
Jose Altuve	158	660	85	**225**	47	3	7	59	36	**.341**	56
Chris Carter	145	507	68	115	21	1	37	88	56	.227	5
Jason Castro	126	465	43	103	21	2	14	56	34	.222	1
Carlos Corporan	55	170	22	40	6	0	6	19	14	.235	0
Matt Dominguez	157	564	51	121	17	0	16	57	29	.215	0
Dexter Fowler	116	434	61	120	21	4	8	35	66	.276	11
Marwin González	103	285	33	79	15	1	6	23	17	.277	2
Robbie Grossman	103	360	42	84	14	2	6	37	55	.233	9
Jesús Guzmán	69	165	10	31	4	0	2	9	19	.188	3
Enrique Hernández	24	81	10	23	4	2	1	8	8	.284	0
L.J. Hoes	55	122	12	21	5	0	3	11	10	.172	0
Marc Krauss	67	186	16	36	6	0	6	21	21	.194	0
Jake Marisnick	51	173	18	47	8	0	3	19	5	.272	6
Gregorio Petit	37	97	14	27	8	0	2	9	1	.278	0
Alex Presley	89	254	22	62	6	1	6	19	13	.244	5
Domingo Santana	6	17	1	0	0	0	0	0	1	.000	0
Jon Singleton	95	310	42	52	13	0	13	44	50	.168	2
George Springer	78	295	45	68	8	1	20	51	39	.231	5
Max Stassi	7	20	2	7	2	0	0	4	0	.350	0
Jonathan Villar	87	263	31	55	13	2	7	27	19	.209	17
**Pitcher totals**	162	19	1	1	1	0	0	0	2	.053	0
**Team totals**	**162**	**5447**	**629**	**1317**	**240**	**19**	**163**	**596**	**495**	**.242**	**122**

=== Pitching ===
Abbreviations key

- W — wins
- L — losses
- ERA — earned run average
- G — games pitched
- GS — games started
- SV — saves
- IP — innings pitched
- H — hits allowed
- R — runs allowed
- ER — earned runs allowed
- BB — base on balls allowed
- SO — strikeouts
- WHIP — walks plus hits per inning pitched

Individual pitching results
Player	W	L	ERA	G	GS	CG	SV	IP	H	R	ER	HR	BB	SO
Matt Albers	0	0	0.90	8	0	0	0	10.0	10	1	1	0	3	8
Anthony Bass	1	1	6.33	21	0	0	2	27.0	32	20	19	6	7	7
Jake Buchanan	1	3	4.58	17	2	0	0	35.1	41	19	18	4	12	20
Kevin Chapman	2	0	4.64	21	0	0	0	21.1	22	11	11	3	11	19
José Cisnero	0	0	9.64	5	0	0	0	4.2	8	5	5	0	4	5
Paul Clemens	0	1	5.84	13	0	0	0	24.2	28	20	16	5	13	16
Jarred Cosart	9	7	4.41	20	20	0	0	116.1	119	61	57	7	51	75
Jorge de León	0	0	4.91	8	0	0	0	7.1	9	4	4	2	3	4
Samuel Deduno	0	1	3.12	5	1	0	0	8.2	5	4	3	0	5	9
Darin Downs	2	1	5.45	45	0	0	0	34.2	28	22	21	2	19	27
Kyle Farnsworth	0	0	6.17	16	0	0	0	11.2	14	8	8	0	4	8
Scott Feldman	8	12	3.74	29	29	1	0	180.1	185	86	75	16	50	107
Josh Fields	4	6	4.45	54	0	0	4	54.2	50	29	27	2	17	70
Michael Foltynewicz	0	1	5.30	16	0	0	0	18.2	23	11	11	3	7	14
Lucas Harrell	0	3	9.49	3	3	0	0	12.1	19	14	13	2	9	9
Dallas Keuchel	12	9	2.93	29	29	5	0	200.0	187	71	65	11	48	146
David Martínez	0	0	5.14	3	0	0	0	7.0	5	4	4	1	2	6
Collin McHugh	11	9	2.73	25	25	0	0	154.2	117	53	47	13	41	157
Brett Oberholtzer	5	13	4.39	24	24	0	0	143.2	170	73	70	12	28	94
Rudy Owens	0	1	7.94	1	1	0	0	5.2	9	5	5	1	2	1
Brad Peacock	4	9	4.72	28	24	0	0	131.2	136	80	69	20	70	119
Chad Qualls	1	5	3.33	58	0	0	19	51.1	54	22	19	5	5	43
Tony Sipp	4	3	3.38	56	0	0	4	50.2	28	19	19	5	17	63
Nick Tropeano	1	3	4.57	4	4	0	0	21.2	19	12	11	0	9	13
Raúl Valdés	0	0	12.27	8	0	0	1	3.2	5	5	5	2	3	4
José Veras	4	0	3.03	34	0	0	1	32.2	25	13	11	4	16	37
Jerome Williams	1	4	6.04	26	0	0	0	47.2	59	33	32	7	16	38
Josh Zeid	0	0	6.97	23	0	0	0	20.2	30	18	16	6	7	18
**Team totals**	**70**	**92**	**4.11**	**162**	**162**	**6**	**31**	**1438.2**	**1437**	**723**	**657**	**139**	**484**	**1137**
Other: Shutouts—Keuchel (1), Feldman (1) • Sources:

== Major League Baseball draft ==
Houston Astros 2014 MLB draft selections
Rd.	Slot	Draftee	Position	School	Origin	Signed	Notes	Bio
1	1	Brady Aiken	Left-handed pitcher	Cathedral Catholic HS	(California)	N	(Note: Signed with the Cleveland Indians from the 2015 draft.)	
1	37	Derek Fisher	Outfielder	Virginia • 2014	(Pennsylvania)	Y	(Note: Selection acquired in a trade along with L. J. Hoes and Josh Hader from the Baltimore Orioles in exchange for Bud Norris on July 31, 2013.) (Note: MLB debut on June 14, 2017, with Houston)	
2	42	A. J. Reed	First baseman	Kentucky • 2014	(Indiana)	Y	(Note: MLB debut on June 25, 2016, with Houston)	
3	75	J. D. Davis	Third baseman	Cal State Fullerton	(California)	Y	(Note: MLB debut on August 5, 2017, with Houston)	

== Awards and achievements ==
=== Grand slams ===
No.	Date	Astros batter	Venue	Inning	Pitcher	Opposing team	Box
1	June 8	Chris Carter (Note: 1st MLB grand slam)	Target Field	7	Brian Duensing	Minnesota Twins	
2	June 8	Jon Singleton	Target Field	9	Glen Perkins	Minnesota Twins	
3	July 5	Chris Carter	Angel Stadium	3 (Note: Tied score or took lead)	Héctor Santiago	Los Angeles Angels	
4	August 17	Jose Altuve	Fenway Park	2	Joe Kelly	Boston Red Sox	
5	August 28	Jason Castro	Minute Maid Park	5	Román Méndez	Texas Rangers	

=== Career honors ===
- Roland Hemond Award: Tal Smith

=== Awards ===
2014 Houston Astros award winners
Name of award		Recipient	Ref.
American League (AL) Rookie of the Month	May	George Springer	
American League (AL) Rookie of the Month	September	Collin McHugh	
Darryl Kile Good Guy Award		Scott Feldman	
Fielding Bible Award	Pitcher	Dallas Keuchel	
Fred Hartman Award for Long and Meritorious Service to Baseball		Jamie Hildreth	
GIBBY Award	Best Breakout Hitter	Jose Altuve	
Gold Glove Award	Pitcher	Dallas Keuchel	
Houston-Area Major League Player of the Year	WAS	Anthony Rendon	
Houston Astros	Most Valuable Player (MVP)	Jose Altuve	
Houston Astros	Pitcher of the Year	Dallas Keuchel	
Houston Astros	Rookie of the Year	Collin McHugh	
Luis Aparicio Award		Jose Altuve	
MLB All-Star Game	Reserve infielder	Jose Altuve	
Silver Slugger Award	Second baseman	Jose Altuve	
Topps All-Star Rookie Team	Outfielder	George Springer	

Other awards results

Name of award	Voting recipient(s) (Team)	Ref.
AL Most Valuable Player	1st—Trout (LAA) • 13th—Altuve (HOU)	
AL Rookie of the Year	1st—J. Abreu (CHW) • 4th—McHugh (HOU) • 8th—Springer (HOU)	
Roberto Clemente^{AL} (Note: Typically bestowed to one player in all of MLB, one winner each was recognized from the AL and National Leagues (NL)—Jimmy Rollins (PHI)—in 2014.)	Winner—Konerko (CHW) • Nominee—Castro (HOU)	

=== League leaders ===
American League batting leaders

- At bats per home run (AB/HR): Chris Carter (13.7—led MLB)
- Batting average: Jose Altuve (.341—led MLB)
- Hits: Jose Altuve (225—led MLB)
- Stolen bases: Jose Altuve (56)

American League pitching leaders

- Complete games: Dallas Keuchel (5)

=== Milestones ===
==== Major League debuts ====
Player—Appeared at position

- George Springer, right fielder
- Jon Singleton, first baseman
Date and opponent

- April 16 vs Kansas City
- June 3 vs Los Angeles (AL)
Box

Also:

== Minor league system ==
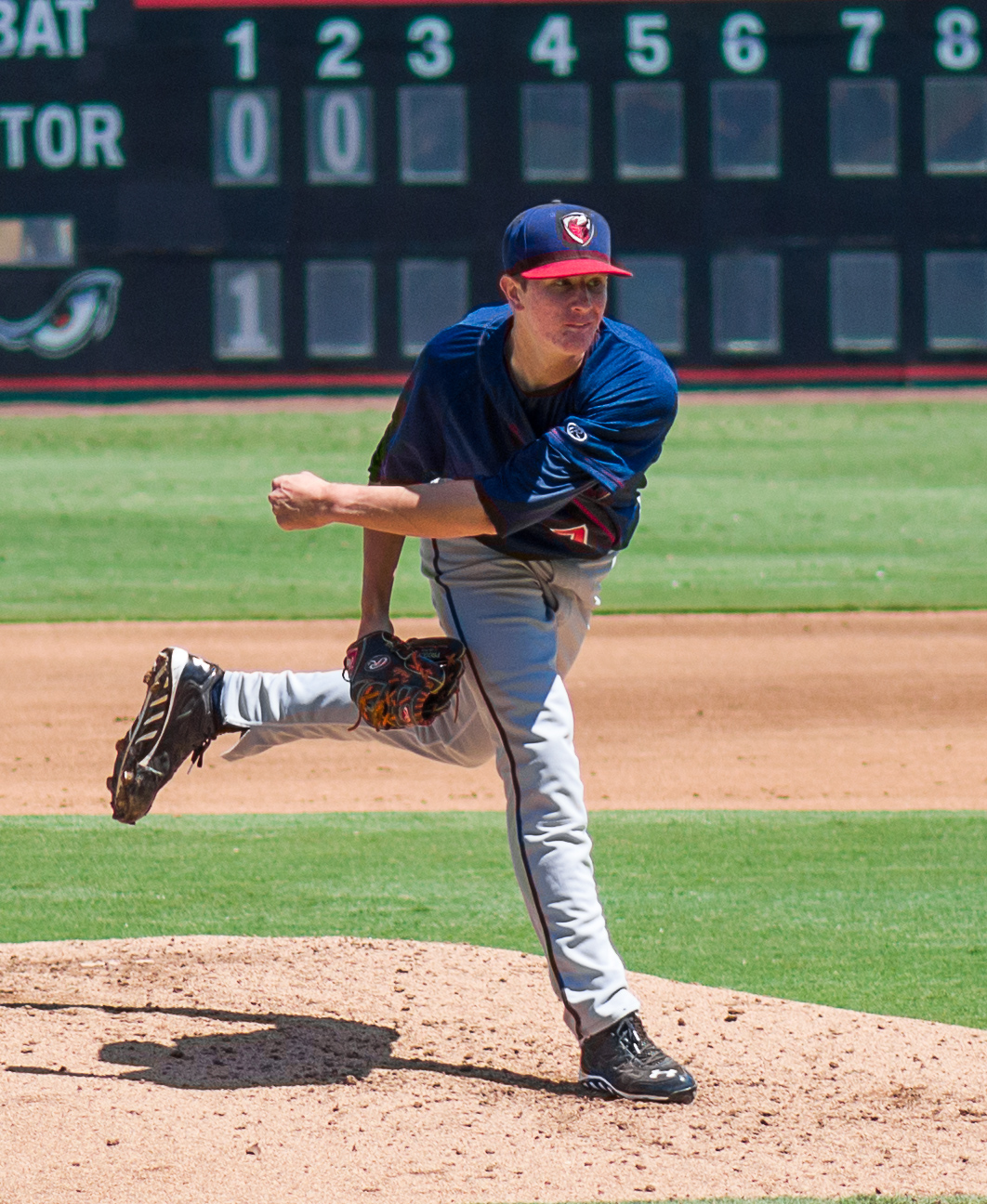
Josh Hader was the starting pitcher in a combined no-hitter for the Lancaster JetHawks.

Level	Team	League	Manager
AAA	Oklahoma City RedHawks	Pacific Coast League	Tom Lawless and Tony DeFrancesco
AA	Corpus Christi Hooks	Texas League	Keith Bodie
A	Lancaster JetHawks	California League	Rodney Linares
A	Quad Cities River Bandits	Midwest League	Omar López
A-Short Season	Tri-City ValleyCats	New York–Penn League	Ed Romero
Rookie	Greeneville Astros	Appalachian League	Josh Bonifay
Rookie	GCL Astros	Gulf Coast League	Marty Malloy

=== Championships ===
- California League champions: Lancaster

=== Awards ===
- California League All-Star Team
  - Catcher: Roberto Peña
  - Second baseman: Tony Kemp
  - Outfielder: Teoscar Hernández
  - Pitcher: Josh Hader
- California League Pitcher of the Year: Josh Hader
- Houston Astros Minor League Pitcher of the Year: Josh Hader
- Houston Astros Minor League Player of the Year: Brett Phillips
- Texas League All-Star:
  - Outfielder: James Ramsay
  - Outfielder: Preston Tucker
  - Pitcher: Tommy Shirley
- Triple-A All-Star Team—Pitcher: Nick Tropeano

=== Summary ===
==== Lancaster JetHawks' combined no-hitter ====
On May 13, Josh Hader, J. D. Osbourne, and Daniel Minor of Lancaster combined to pitch a no-hitter versus Bakersfield, a 1–0 victory. Hader, the starting pitcher, worked six innings and fanned six, while navigating four walks. Three of the walks were issued in the second inning. Through that start, Hader had surrendered one run or fewer in six of eight outings, and his 2.56 earned run average ranked fourth-best in the California League. This was Lancaster's third no-hitter within the previous five seasons, and followed the second by one year and one day.

== See also ==
- List of first overall Major League Baseball draft picks
- List of Major League Baseball annual stolen base leaders
- List of Major League Baseball batting champions
- List of Major League Baseball league leaders in hits 3 or more consecutive seasons
- List of Major League Baseball titles leaders
