= Tom Lawless =

American baseball player and manager (born 1956)

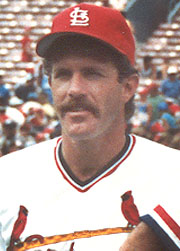
- Lawless during his tenure with the Cardinals
- Infielder / Manager
- Born: December 19, 1956 (age 69); Erie, Pennsylvania, U.S.
- Batted: Right Threw: Right

MLB debut
- July 15, 1982, for the Cincinnati Reds

Last MLB appearance
- July 4, 1990, for the Toronto Blue Jays

MLB statistics
- Batting average: .207
- Home runs: 2
- Runs batted in: 24
- Managerial record: 11–13
- Winning %: .458
- Stats at Baseball Reference
- Managerial record at Baseball Reference

Teams
- As player: Cincinnati Reds (1982–1984); Montreal Expos (1984); St. Louis Cardinals (1985–1988); Toronto Blue Jays (1989–1990); As manager: Houston Astros (2014)

Thomas James Lawless (born December 19, 1956) is an American former professional baseball infielder. He played in Major League Baseball (MLB) between 1982 and 1990 for the Cincinnati Reds, Montreal Expos, St. Louis Cardinals, and Toronto Blue Jays.

He was the interim manager of the Houston Astros in 2014.

== Career ==
Lawless grew up in Erie, Pennsylvania, attending Strong Vincent High School and Penn State Behrend, where he played baseball from 1975 to 1978.

Lawless became famous in 1984 when he became the only player ever traded for Pete Rose.

Lawless, who only hit two regular-season home runs in his career, hit a dramatic go-ahead home run in Game 4 of the 1987 World Series (he had hit .080 in 25 at-bats during the regular season.) Lawless later expressed shock that he had managed to hit a home run. "When it went over the wall, I thought, 'Holy cow, it went out.' I went blank. I don't remember flipping the bat."

On May 10, 1989, while with the Toronto Blue Jays, Lawless' ninth-inning single broke up a no-hit bid by Mark Langston of the Seattle Mariners.

A fast and highly skilled baserunner, Lawless struggled to hit major league pitching and retired in 1990. He entered the coaching ranks and has become a successful minor league manager. In 2007, he served as a coach for the China national baseball team during its participation in Major League Baseball's Instructional League program and in the Arizona Fall League. He managed the Lexington Legends, the Class A affiliate of the Houston Astros, for the 2009 season. On November 16, 2009, Lawless was named the new manager for the Lancaster JetHawks, the Class A Advanced affiliate of the Houston Astros, for the 2010 season. In 2011, Lawless was managing the Corpus Christi Hooks of the Texas League. On September 1, 2014, after the Astros fired Bo Porter, Lawless was hired as the interim manager. As interim manager with Houston, he had a record of 11 wins and 13 losses.

== Managerial record ==
Team	From	To	Regular season record				Post–season record			
Team	From	To	G	W	L	Win %	G	W	L	Win %
Houston Astros	2014	2014	24	11	13	.458	—			
Total			24	11	13	.458	0	0	0	–
Ref.:

Preceded by Jack Voigt	Frederick Keys manager 2003-2004	Succeeded by Bien Figueroa
