= Rocking Chair =

Rocking Chair may refer to:

- Rocking chair, a piece of furniture
- "Rockin' Chair" (1929 song), a 1929 popular song with music composed by Hoagy Carmichael
- Rockin' Chair (The Band song), 1969
- "Rockin' Chair" (Gwen McCrae song), 1975
- Rockin' Chair (Roy Eldridge album), 1955
- Rockin' Chair (Jonathan Edwards album), 1976
- Rockin' Chairs, a doo-wop band active in the 1950s
- "Rocking Chair", a song by Labi Siffre from the 1971 album The Singer and the Song
- ”Rockin’ Chair”, a song by Oasis from the single Roll With It, Morning Glory and also the compilation album The Masterplan
- "Rocking Chair", a song by tUnE-yArDs from the 2014 album Nikki Nack
