= Robbie Grossman =

American baseball player (born 1989)

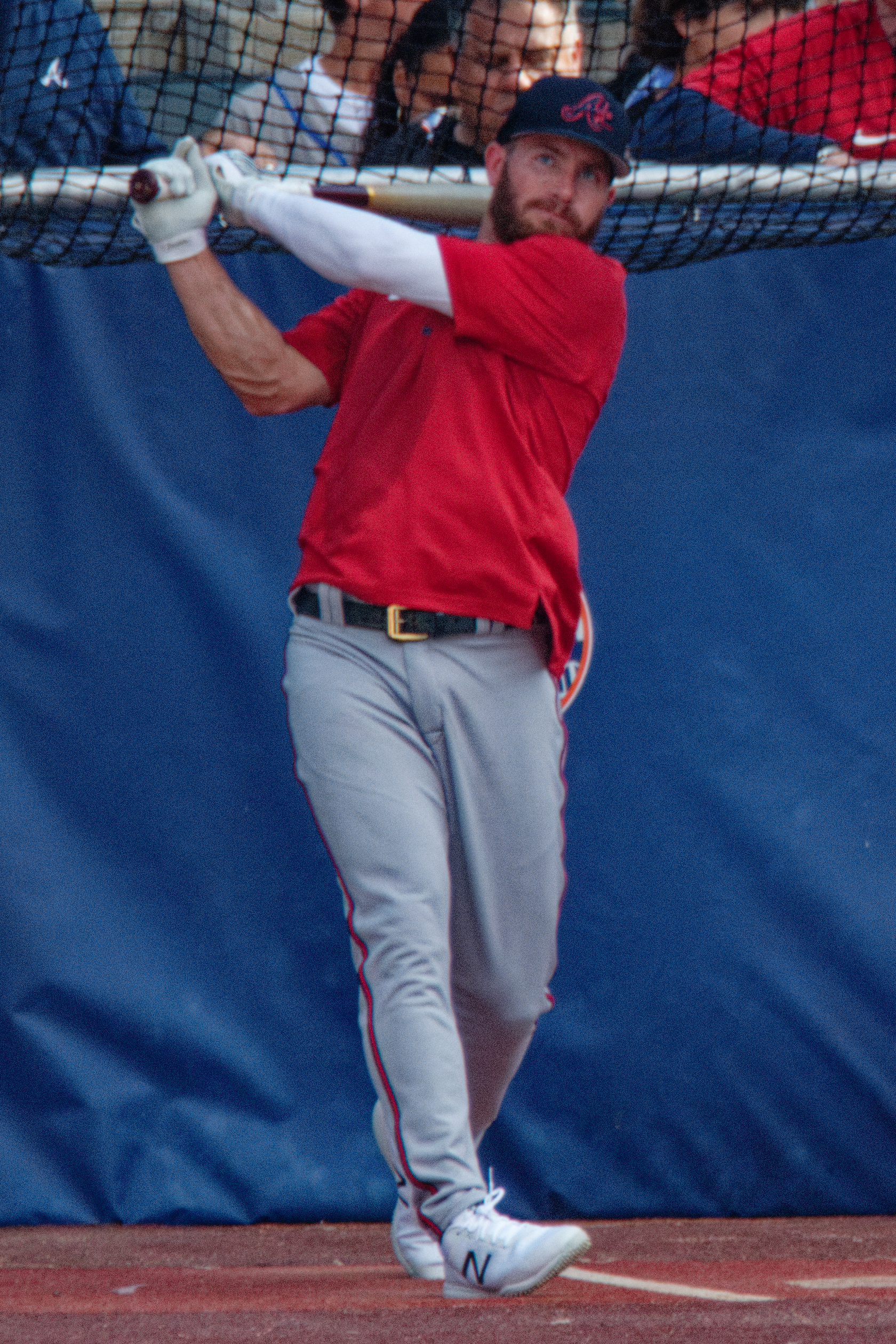
- Grossman with the Braves in 2022
- Outfielder
- Born: September 16, 1989 (age 36); San Diego, California, U.S.
- Batted: Switch Threw: Left

MLB debut
- April 24, 2013, for the Houston Astros

Last MLB appearance
- September 28, 2024, for the Kansas City Royals

MLB statistics
- Batting average: .242
- Home runs: 93
- Runs batted in: 431
- Stats at Baseball Reference

Teams
- Houston Astros (2013–2015); Minnesota Twins (2016–2018); Oakland Athletics (2019–2020); Detroit Tigers (2021–2022); Atlanta Braves (2022); Texas Rangers (2023); Chicago White Sox (2024); Texas Rangers (2024); Kansas City Royals (2024)

Career highlights and awards
- World Series champion (2023)

Robert Edward Grossman (born September 16, 1989) is an American former professional baseball outfielder. He played in Major League Baseball (MLB) for the Houston Astros, Minnesota Twins, Oakland Athletics, Detroit Tigers, Atlanta Braves, Texas Rangers, Chicago White Sox, and Kansas City Royals. After attending high school in Texas, Grossman was drafted by the Pittsburgh Pirates in the sixth round in 2008. He made his MLB debut with the Astros in 2013. He won the 2023 World Series with the Rangers.

== Early life ==
Grossman was born in San Diego, California, but grew up in Cypress, Texas. He attended Cy-Fair High School and played baseball on the varsity team for four seasons between 2005 and 2008. He was a first-team all-district selection as a freshman. In his junior season, the team won the 5A state baseball championship.

== Professional career ==
=== Minor leagues ===
Considered a possible first round pick, Grossman fell in the 2008 Major League Baseball draft due to his commitment to attend the University of Texas. However, the Pirates selected Grossman in the sixth round of the draft and signed him for an above slot $1 million signing bonus.

In 2010, Grossman played for the Bradenton Marauders of the High-A Florida State League (FSL). In 2011, again playing for the Marauders, Grossman became the first minor league player since Nick Swisher in 2004 to score 100 runs and walk 100 times in a season; he also became the first player in the FSL to do so since 1998. He was named Minor League Player of the Year for the Pittsburgh organization.

Kevin Goldstein of Baseball Prospectus ranked Grossman as the 76th best prospect in baseball before the 2012 season. The Pirates invited Grossman to spring training in 2012. On July 24, 2012, the Pirates traded him to the Houston Astros along with Rudy Owens and Colton Cain for Wandy Rodríguez. Between Pittsburgh's Double-A affiliate, the Altoona Curve of the Eastern League, and Houston's Double-A team, the Corpus Christi Hooks of the Texas League, Grossman hit .266 with 10 home runs in 131 games.

=== Houston Astros (2013–2015) ===
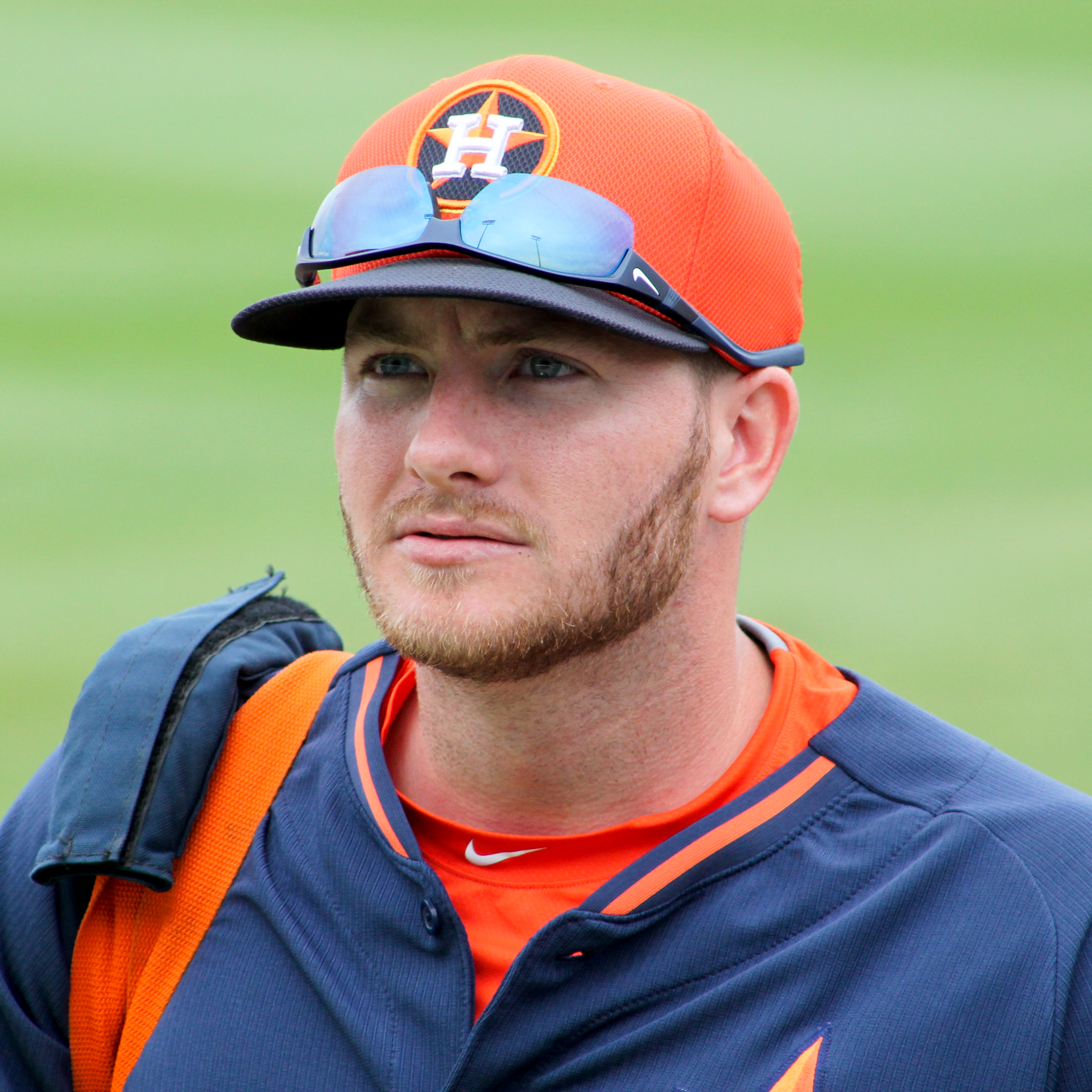
Grossman at spring training in 2015

The Astros promoted Grossman to the major leagues on April 24, 2013, he batted leadoff in his debut. He split time that year between the Oklahoma City Redhawks of the Triple-A Pacific Coast League and the Astros. At one point, Grossman hit safely in 13 consecutive games, a team high that year.

Grossman played in 103 games for the Astros in 2014, hitting for a .233 batting average, six home runs and 37 runs batted in (RBI).

After spending much of the 2015 season in the minors, while in the majors in 49 at bats hitting .143/.222/.245, he was released by the Astros after the 2015 season.

=== Minnesota Twins (2016–2018) ===
On December 11, 2015, Grossman signed a minor league contract with the Cleveland Indians, receiving a non-roster invitation to spring training. He opted out of his contract on May 16, 2016, and signed with the Minnesota Twins. The Twins promoted him to the major leagues on May 19, and he hit a home run in his first game with the Twins on May 20. He split time among the outfield, where his eight errors led all AL left fielders, and DH. He appeared in 99 games for the Twins, setting career highs in home runs, average, walks and runs scored. Statcast rated him in the bottom 1% in the major leagues in fielding run value, and the bottom 7% in arm value.

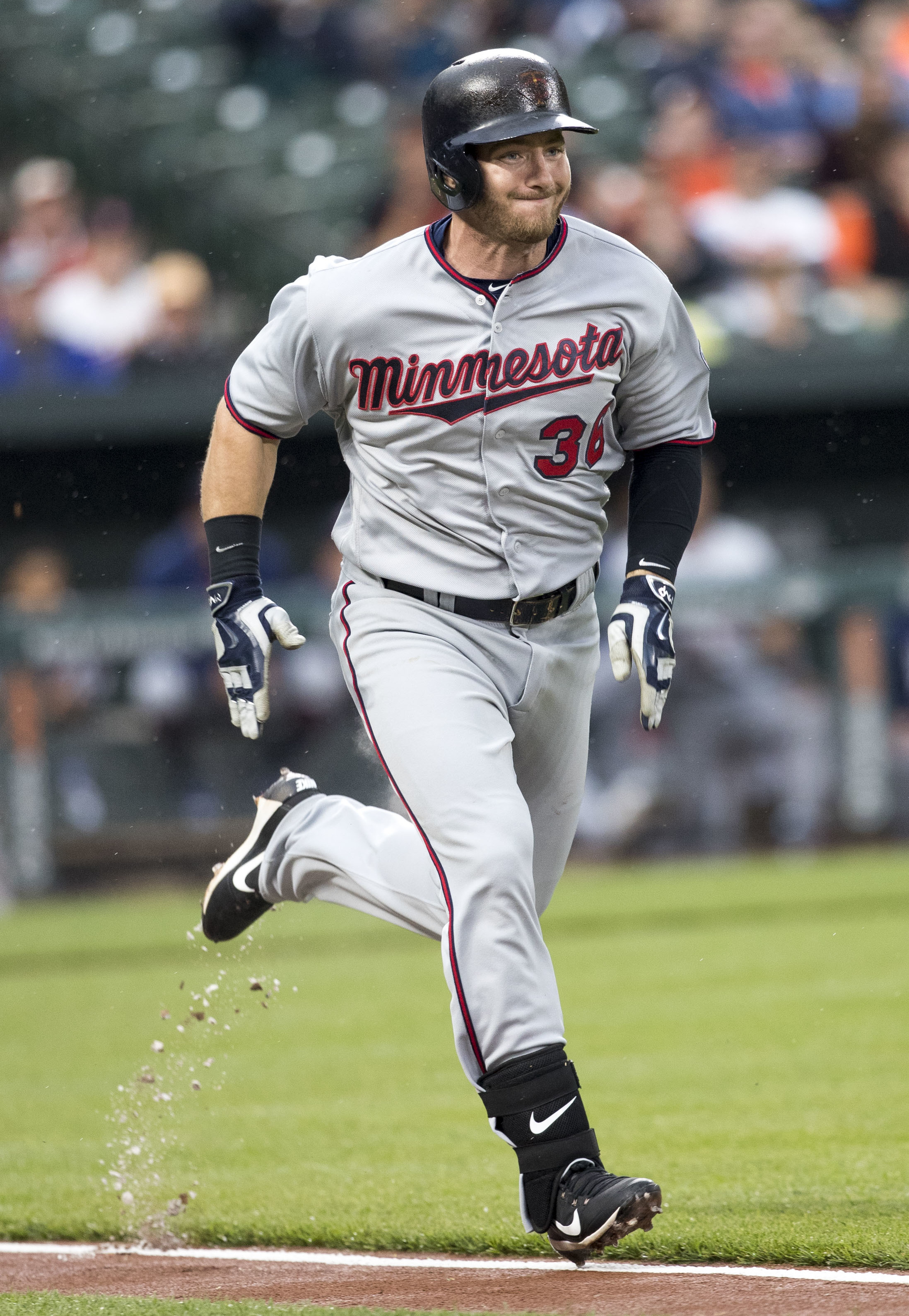
Grossman with the Twins in 2017

In 2017, Grossman established himself as a regular in the Twins' lineup, playing in a career-high 119 games despite missing a few weeks with a thumb fracture, hitting .246 with nine home runs and 45 RBIs. He was a designated hitter for 63 games, in right field for 35 games, and in left field for 18 games.

In 2018, Grossman began the season as the Twins' designated hitter. He played in a career-high 129 games, hitting .273 with five home runs and 48 RBIs. On November 30, 2018, the Twins non-tendered him and he became a free agent.

=== Oakland Athletics (2019–2020) ===
On February 15, 2019, Grossman signed a one-year deal with the Oakland Athletics. Grossman in 2020 did not perform as he did the previous season, as he hit just .240 with a .348 slugging percentage with 6 home runs and 38 RBI in 138 games. Statcast rated him in the bottom 4% in the major leagues in arm value.

=== Detroit Tigers (2021–2022) ===
On January 5, 2021, Grossman signed a two-year, $10 million contract with the Detroit Tigers. On May 28, Grossman hit his first career walk-off home run against Justin Wilson to give the Tigers a 3–2 extra innings win over the New York Yankees. While hitting .239 for the 2021 season, Grossman had a career-high 98 walks (fourth in the AL) for a .357 on-base percentage. He posted numerous other career highs, including at-bats (557), home runs (23), RBI (67) and stolen bases (20). He became the seventh player in Tigers franchise history to post a season of 20+ home runs and 20+ stolen bases. Statcast rated him in the bottom 1% in the major leagues in arm value.

On May 10, 2022, Grossman set a new MLB all-time record for position players with 401 consecutive games without an error. On July 10, Grossman's errorless streak ended at 440, after he dropped a pop up off of the bat of Chicago White Sox outfielder Luis Robert. In 83 games with Detroit in 2022, Grossman hit .205/.313/.282 with 2 home runs, 23 RBI, and 3 stolen bases. Statcast rated him in the bottom 8% in the major leagues in arm value.

=== Atlanta Braves (2022) ===
On August 1, 2022, Grossman was traded to the Atlanta Braves for pitcher Kris Anglin. He played in 46 games for the Braves down the stretch, batting .217/.306/.370 with 5 home runs, 22 RBI, and 3 stolen bases. He became a free agent following the season.

=== Texas Rangers (2023) ===
On February 17, 2023, Grossman signed a one-year contract with the Texas Rangers for $2 million. In 115 games for Texas, he batted .238/.340/.394 with 10 home runs and 49 RBIs, while playing 48 games in left field, 40 games at DH, and 28 games in right field.

=== Chicago White Sox (2024) ===
On March 22, 2024, Grossman signed a minor league contract with the Chicago White Sox. After hitting .400 with two home runs and five RBI for the Triple–A Charlotte Knights, Grossman had his contract selected to the major league roster on April 5.

=== Second Stint with Rangers (2024) ===
On May 8, 2024, the White Sox traded Grossman to the Rangers in exchange for Anthony Hoopii-Tuionetoa. In 46 games for Texas, Grossman slashed .238/.336/.362 with three home runs and 10 RBI.

=== Kansas City Royals (2024) ===
On August 31, 2024, Grossman was claimed off waivers by the Kansas City Royals.
