= Brett Oberholtzer =

American baseball player (born 1989)

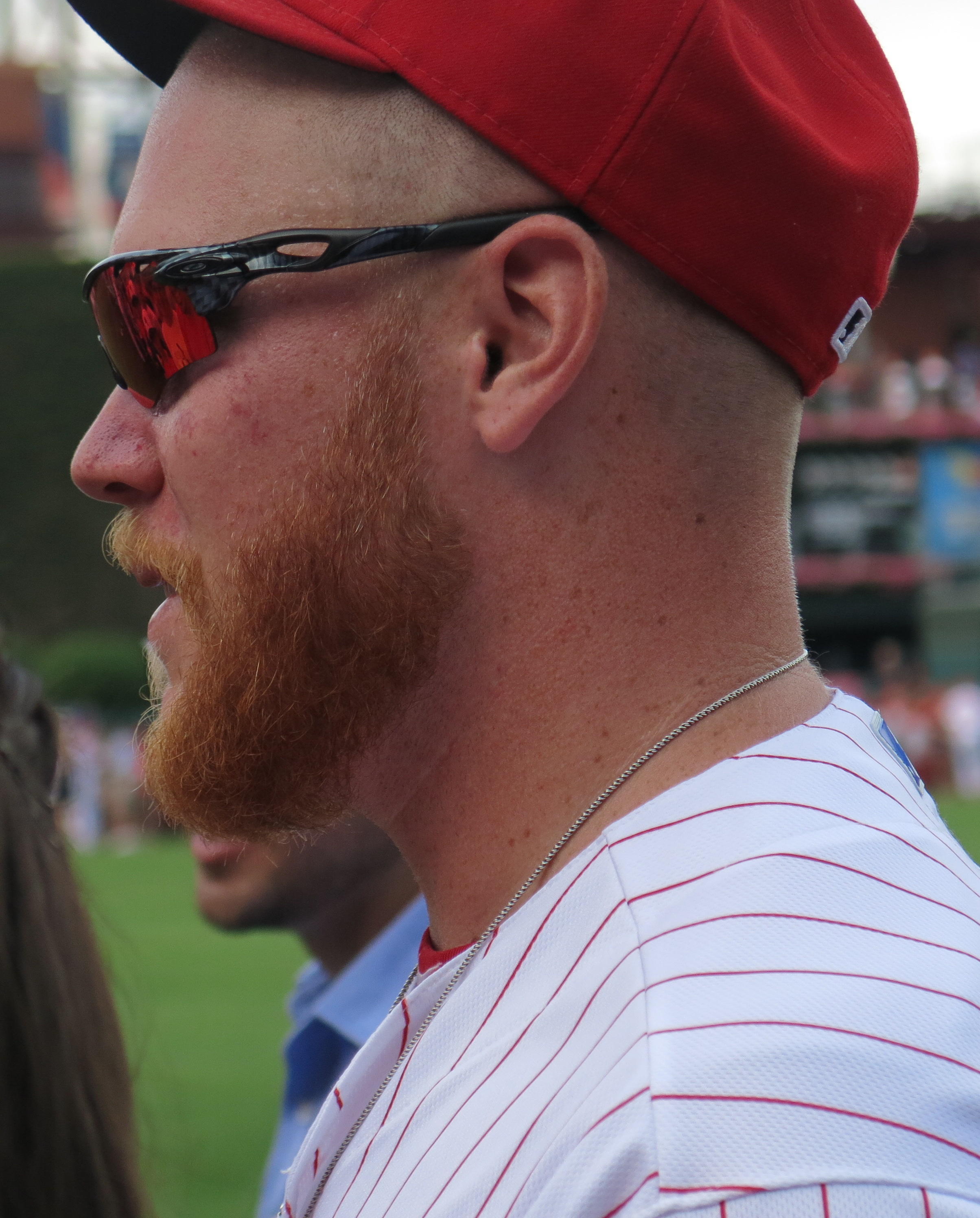
- Oberholtzer with the Phillies in 2016
- Pitcher
- Born: July 1, 1989 (age 37); Christiana, Delaware, U.S.
- Batted: Left Threw: Left

MLB debut
- April 21, 2013, for the Houston Astros

Last MLB appearance
- October 1, 2016, for the Los Angeles Angels

MLB statistics
- Win–loss record: 14–23
- Earned run average: 4.36
- Strikeouts: 220
- Stats at Baseball Reference

Teams
- Houston Astros (2013–2015); Philadelphia Phillies (2016); Los Angeles Angels (2016)

Brett Raymond Oberholtzer (born July 1, 1989) is an American former professional baseball pitcher. He played in Major League Baseball (MLB) for the Houston Astros, Philadelphia Phillies, and Los Angeles Angels.

== Early life ==
Oberholtzer attended William Penn High School in New Castle, Delaware, where he pitched for the school's baseball team. He was named to the All-Delaware team in 2006. He was selected by the Seattle Mariners in the 47th round of the 2007 Major League Baseball draft, but did not sign.

== College career ==
Oberholtzer then attended Seminole Community College, a junior college, for one year.

== Professional career ==
=== Atlanta Braves ===
==== Minor leagues ====
The Atlanta Braves drafted Oberholtzer in the eighth round in the 2008 Major League Baseball draft, and assigned him to the rookie–level Gulf Coast League Braves. In ten relief pitching appearances, he posted a 4–1 win–loss record, 2.89 earned run average (ERA), and 32 strikeouts in 37 1/3 innings pitched. In 2009, Oberholtzer was assigned to the Appalachian League's Danville Braves, where he made the first 12 starts of his professional career. On July 6, 2009, he was named the Appalachian League's pitcher of the week. In 67 total innings, Oberholtzer went 6–2 with a 2.01 ERA and 56 strikeouts. He made his full-season baseball debut in 2010, splitting the season between the Single–A Rome Braves and the High–A Myrtle Beach Pelicans. In 26 combined appearances, 22 of which were starts, Oberholtzer pitched to a 6–8 record, 3.78 ERA, and 126 strikeouts in 135 2/3 innings.

In 2011, Oberholtzer was assigned to the Double–A Mississippi Braves, where he won the Southern League's pitcher of the week award on July 25 and was named a mid-season All-Star. With the Braves, he posted a 9–9 record, 3.74 ERA, and 93 strikeouts.

=== Houston Astros ===
On July 25, 2011, the Braves traded Oberholtzer to the Houston Astros alongside Juan Abreu, Paul Clemens, and Jordan Schafer in exchange for Michael Bourn. Oberholtzer was assigned to the Double–A Corpus Christi Hooks for the remainder of the 2011 minor league season, and pitched to a 2–3 record, 5.27 ERA, and 28 strikeouts. He split time in 2012 with Corpus Christi and the Triple–A Oklahoma City RedHawks. In a career-high 166 2/3 innings pitched, Oberholtzer posted a 10–10 win–loss record, 4.37 ERA, and 137 strikeouts.

==== Major leagues ====
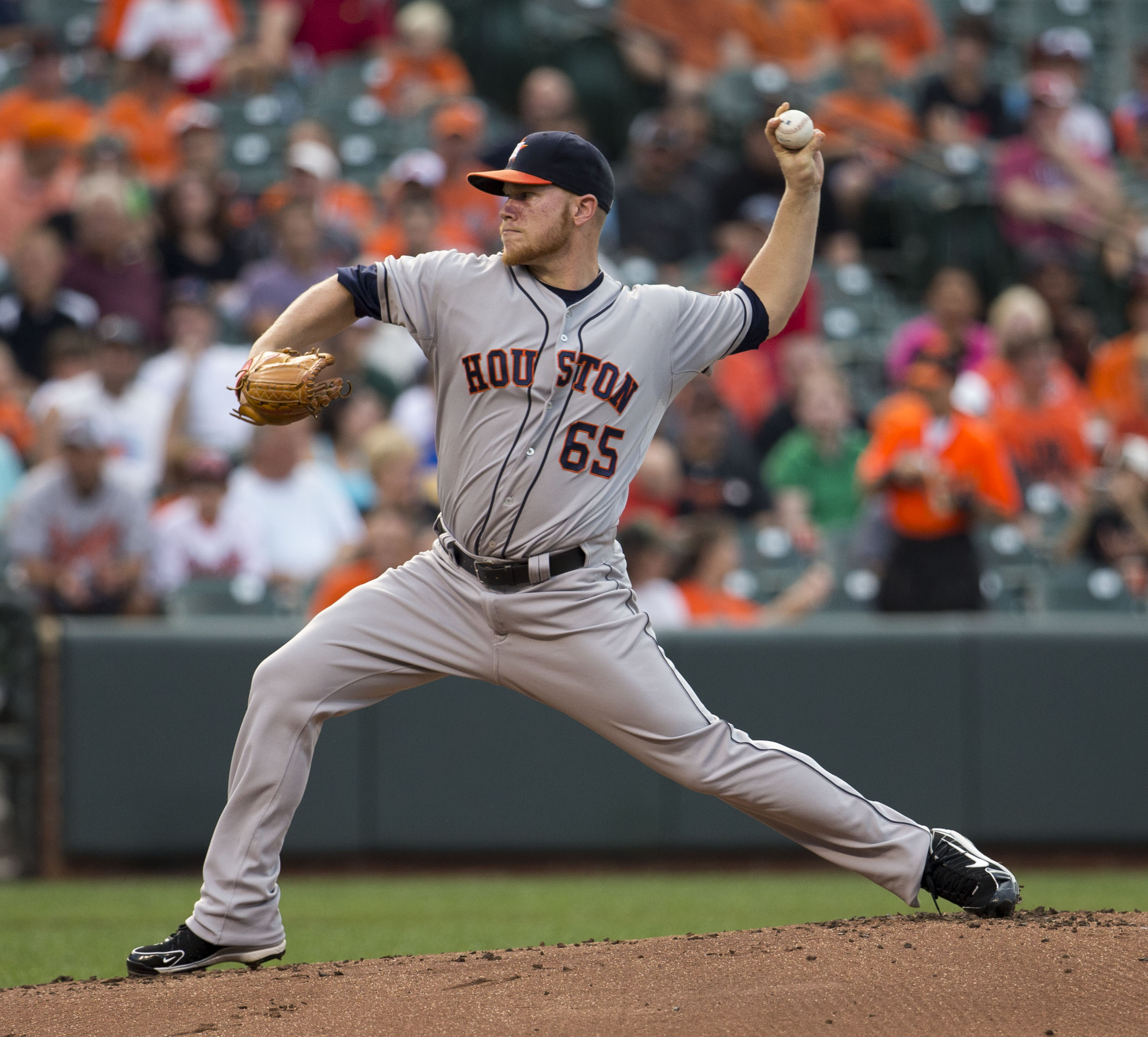
Oberholtzer with the Astros in 2013

Oberholtzer made his Major League debut on April 21, 2013. He made his first career start and got his first career win against the Baltimore Orioles, on July 31. During his tenure with the Astros in 2013, he appeared in 13 games (10 starts) going 4-5 with a 2.76 ERA and 45 strikeouts. With Triple–A Oklahoma City in 2013, Oberholtzer pitched to a 6–6 record in 16 starts, with a 4.37 ERA and 72 strikeouts. Oberholtzer made 24 starts with the Astros in 2014, and five in Triple-A. With Houston, he went 5–13 with a 4.39 ERA and 94 strikeouts in 143 2/3 innings. In his five minor league starts, Oberholtzer posted a 1–2 win–loss record with a 4.65 ERA and 31 strikeouts in 31 total innings.

Oberholtzer battled a blister on his left index finger early in the 2015 season. He was placed on the disabled list on March 31, and was activated in May. Oberholtzer was pulled from his first start after three inning when the blister recurred, and went on the disabled list once again. On June 27, after giving up 6 runs in 1 1/3 innings to the New York Yankees, Oberholtzer was immediately ejected when he intentionally threw at Yankee third baseman Alex Rodriguez; although Oberholtzer said it was inadvertent, immediately after the game the Astros optioned him to Triple–A. He would make just eight starts for the Astros in 2015, going 2–2 with a 4.46 ERA and 27 strikeouts in 38 1/3 innings. With the Triple–A Fresno Grizzlies, Oberholtzer went 7–4 in 12 starts, with a 3.86 ERA and 52 strikeouts in 70 total innings.

=== Philadelphia Phillies ===
On December 12, 2015, the Astros traded Oberholtzer, Mark Appel, Vince Velasquez, Tom Eshelman, and Harold Arauz to the Philadelphia Phillies in exchange for Ken Giles and Jonathan Arauz. He was designated for assignment on August 6, 2016. With the Phillies, Oberholtzer pitched to a 2–2 record, 4.83 ERA, and 38 strikeouts in 26 relief appearances.

=== Los Angeles Angels ===
The Los Angeles Angels claimed Oberholtzer off waivers on August 9, 2016. He made 11 appearances for the Angels, posting a 1–1 record, 8.55 ERA, and 16 strikeouts in 20 total innings. He was designated for assignment on October 28, and later cleared waivers and was sent outright to the Triple–A Salt Lake Bees on November 2. Oberholtzer elected free agency on November 7.

=== Toronto Blue Jays ===
On December 7, 2016, Oberholtzer signed a minor league contract with the Toronto Blue Jays. He was added to the active roster on July 31, 2017, and designated for assignment the following day to make room on the roster for Nori Aoki. He cleared waivers and was sent outright to the Triple–A Buffalo Bisons on August 3. On October 13, Oberholtzer elected free agency.

=== Colorado Rockies ===
On April 4, 2018, Oberholtzer signed with the Somerset Patriots of the Atlantic League of Professional Baseball. However, on April 24, Oberholtzer signed a minor league contract with the Colorado Rockies. In 24 games (23 starts) for the Triple–A Albuquerque Isotopes, he compiled a 7–10 record and 5.77 ERA with 91 strikeouts across 132 2/3 innings pitched. Oberholtzer elected free agency following the season on November 2.

=== Somerset Patriots ===
On February 19, 2019, Oberholtzer signed with the Somerset Patriots of the Atlantic League of Professional Baseball. In 14 starts for the Patriots, he logged a 7–1 record and 3.49 ERA with 70 strikeouts across 77 1/3 innings pitched. Oberholtzer was released by Somerset on August 5.

=== Chinatrust Brothers ===
On July 27, 2019, Oberholtzer signed with the Chinatrust Brothers of the Chinese Professional Baseball League. He never appeared in a game with the main club or farm team and became a free agent following the season.

=== Somserset Patriots (third stint) ===
On February 17, 2020, Oberholtzer signed with the Somerset Patriots of the Atlantic League of Professional Baseball. He did not play a game for the team due to the cancellation of the ALPB season because of the COVID-19 pandemic and became a free agent after the year.
