= Jake Buchanan =

American baseball player (born 1989)

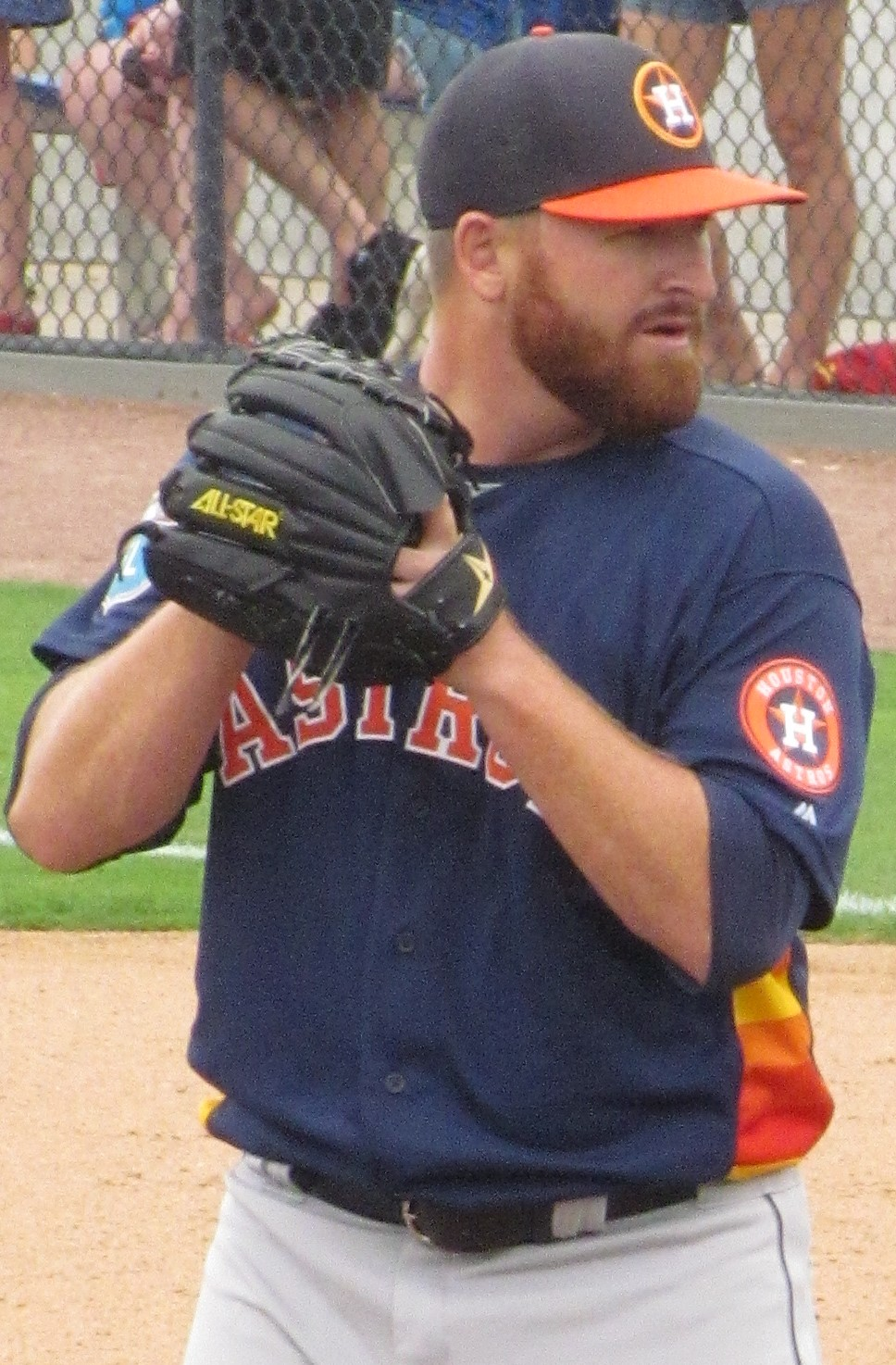
- Buchanan with the Houston Astros
- Pitcher
- Born: September 24, 1989 (age 36); Charlotte, North Carolina, U.S.
- Batted: Right Threw: Right

MLB debut
- June 21, 2014, for the Houston Astros

Last MLB appearance
- June 17, 2017, for the Cincinnati Reds

MLB statistics
- Win–loss record: 2–3
- Earned run average: 4.73
- Strikeouts: 33
- Stats at Baseball Reference

Teams
- Houston Astros (2014–2015); Chicago Cubs (2016); Cincinnati Reds (2017)

Jake Thomas Buchanan (born September 24, 1989) is an American former professional baseball pitcher. He played in Major League Baseball (MLB) for the Houston Astros, Chicago Cubs, and Cincinnati Reds.

== Career ==
=== Amateur ===
Buchanan attended North Gaston High School in Dallas, North Carolina. He then enrolled at North Carolina State University (NC State), where he played college baseball for the NC State Wolfpack. By his junior year at NC State, Buchanan emerged as the team's best pitcher. In 2009, he played collegiate summer baseball with the Cotuit Kettleers of the Cape Cod Baseball League.

=== Houston Astros ===
The Houston Astros selected Buchanan in the eighth round of the 2010 Major League Baseball draft. In 2011, Buchanan pitched for the Lancaster JetHawks of the High–A California League and the Corpus Christi Hooks of the Double–A Texas League. Pitching to a 3.80 earned run average, the Astros named Buchanan their Minor League Pitcher of the Year.

In 2012, 5.25 ERA with Corpus Christi and the Oklahoma City RedHawks of the Triple–A Pacific Coast League. Assigned to Corpus Christi to start the 2013 season, Buchanan led the Texas League in ERA and walks plus hits per innings pitched during the first half of the season, and the Astros promoted him to Oklahoma City after he participated in the Texas League All-Star Game. Buchanan was assigned to Oklahoma City to start the 2014 season.

On June 21, 2014, Buchanan was promoted to the major leagues for the first time. He made his MLB debut the same day. Buchanan made 17 appearances for Houston during his rookie campaign, compiling a 1–3 record and 4.58 ERA with 20 strikeouts across 35 1/3 innings pitched.

Buchanan pitched in five games for Houston in 2015, recording a 2.00 ERA with five strikeouts over nine innings of work. On September 1, 2015, Buchanan was designated for assignment by the Astros, to clear roster space for Joe Thatcher. He cleared waivers and was sent outright to the Triple-A Fresno Grizzlies on September 6.

Buchanan was released by the Astros organization on March 31, 2016.

=== Chicago Cubs ===
On April 3, 2016, Buchanan signed a minor league contract with the Chicago Cubs. He was promoted to the major-league roster from the Triple-A Iowa Cubs when rosters expanded on September 1. Buchanan appeared in two games for the Cubs to finish 2016, and had a 1–0 record with a 1.50 ERA. The Cubs eventually won the 2016 World Series, giving Buchanan his first championship title, although he did not play in the postseason. He was designated for assignment on May 22, 2017.

=== Cincinnati Reds ===
On May 25, 2017, Buchanan was claimed off waivers by the Cincinnati Reds. On June 27, Buchanan was designated for assignment by the Reds. On June 29, Buchanan was outrighted to the minor leagues but rejected the assignment and became a free agent.

=== Arizona Diamondbacks ===
On July 6, 2017, Buchanan signed a minor league contract with the Arizona Diamondbacks. He became a free agent at the end of the season, and signed another minor league contract with the Diamondbacks on December 26. In 27 games (26 starts) for the Triple–A Reno Aces, he posted an 11–9 record and 5.17 ERA with 86 strikeouts across 156 2/3 innings pitched. Buchanan elected free agency following the season on November 3, 2018.

=== Oakland Athletics ===
On November 12, 2018, Buchanan signed a minor league contract with the Oakland Athletics. He made 20 starts for the Triple-A Las Vegas Aviators, posting a 3–6 record and 6.16 ERA with 71 strikeouts across 99 1/3 innings pitched. Buchanan was released by Oakland on July 30, 2019.

=== Washington Nationals ===
On August 23, 2019, Buchanan signed a minor league contract with the Washington Nationals. In 4 appearances for the Triple–A Fresno Grizzlies, he struggled to a 9.64 ERA with 3 strikeouts over 4 2/3 innings pitched. Buchanan elected free agency after the season on November 4.

=== High Point Rockers ===
On February 28, 2020, Buchanan signed with the High Point Rockers of the Atlantic League of Professional Baseball. He did not play a game for the team because of the cancellation of the ALPB season due to the COVID-19 pandemic and became a free agent after the year.

=== Los Angeles Angels ===
On March 2, 2021, Buchanan signed with the Gastonia Honey Hunters of the Atlantic League of Professional Baseball. However, on May 13, before the ALPB season began, Buchanan signed a minor league contract with the Los Angeles Angels. He made 16 appearances (six starts) for the Triple-A Salt Lake Bees, registering a 3–4 record and 7.12 ERA with 39 strikeouts in 43 innings pitched. Buchanan elected free agency following the season on November 7.

== Personal life ==
Buchanan married former NC State swimmer Chelsa Messinger on January 25, 2014. The two met in college when they were both student athletes at NC State.
