= L. J. Hoes =

American baseball player (born 1990)

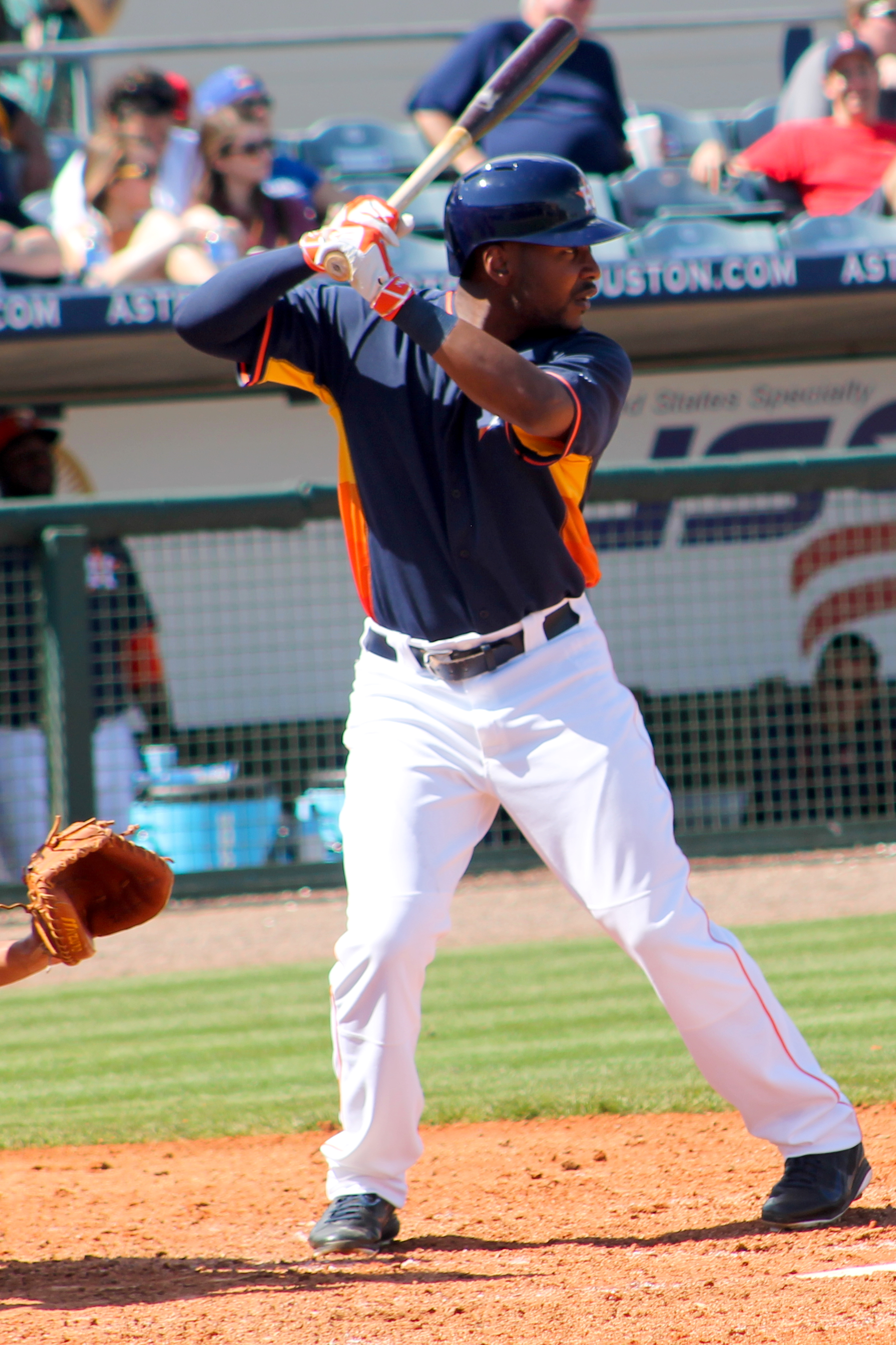
- Hoes with the Houston Astros
- Outfielder
- Born: March 5, 1990 (age 36); Washington, D.C., U.S.
- Batted: Right Threw: Right

MLB debut
- September 25, 2012, for the Baltimore Orioles

Last MLB appearance
- July 23, 2015, for the Houston Astros

MLB statistics
- Batting average: .237
- Home runs: 4
- Runs batted in: 22
- Stats at Baseball Reference

Teams
- Baltimore Orioles (2012–2013); Houston Astros (2013–2015)

Jerome O'Bryan "L. J." Hoes (born March 5, 1990) is an American former professional baseball outfielder. He played in Major League Baseball (MLB) for the Baltimore Orioles and the Houston Astros.

== Professional career ==
Hoes was born in Washington, DC, where he attended St. John's College High School.

=== Baltimore Orioles ===
Hoes was drafted by the Baltimore Orioles as a second baseman in the third round (81st overall) of the 2008 Major League Baseball draft. Hoes was assigned to the rookie-level Gulf Coast League Orioles, where in 48 games, he hit .308 with one home run, 18 RBI and 10 stolen bases. Hoes played 2009 with the Single-A Delmarva Shorebirds, where in 119 games, he hit .260 with two home runs, seven RBI, and 20 stolen bases. Hoes spent most of 2010 with the High-A Frederick Keys, but also had a rehab assignment with the Low-A Aberdeen IronBirds and a three-game stint with the Double-A Bowie Baysox. In 108 total games, he hit .290 with four home runs, 50 RBI, and 11 stolen bases. After beginning 2011 with Frederick, Hoes was promoted to Bowie in late May. He was used mostly as an outfielder in Bowie, and has played in the outfield since then. In 136 total games, Hoes hit .285 with nine home runs, 75 RBI, and 20 stolen bases.

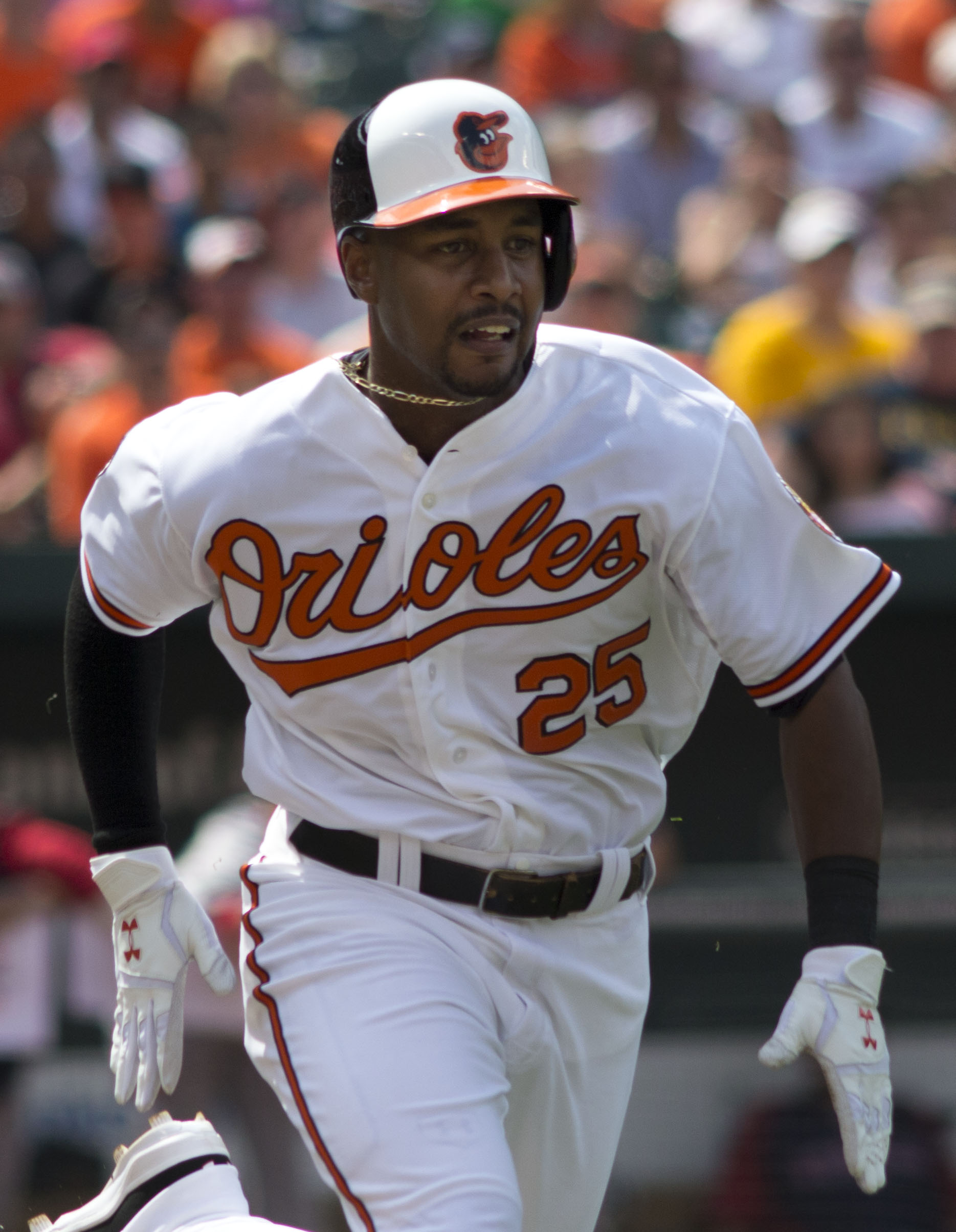
Hoes with the Baltimore Orioles in 2013

Prior to the 2012 season, Hoes was ranked by Baseball America as the Orioles fifth best prospect. Hoes began the year in Bowie, but was promoted to the Triple-A Norfolk Tides in June. In 133 games before being called up, he hit .287 with five home runs, 54 RBI, and 20 stolen bases.

Hoes was called up to the majors for the first time on September 11, 2012. He made his debut on September 25, where he came in as a pinch-runner. His first plate appearance, a groundout, came the next day as a pinch-hitter. The appearances served as the only games Hoes would play in during his rookie campaign. After the season, Hoes played for the Mesa Solar Sox, where in 19 games, he hit .257 with four stolen bases.

Hoes began 2013 with Norfolk, where he hit .304 with three home runs, 40 RBI, and seven stolen bases in 99 games. Hoes made only one appearance for the Orioles during the year on July 28, 2013, going 0-for-3 in a loss to the Boston Red Sox.

=== Houston Astros ===
On July 31, 2013, Hoes and Josh Hader were traded to the Houston Astros in exchange for Bud Norris. He made his Astros debut that night, going 0–5 in an 11–0 win over the Baltimore Orioles. Hoes played in 46 more games with the Astros that year, hitting .287 with one home and 10 RBI.

Hoes made 55 appearances for Houston during the 2014 campaign, batting .172/.230/.287 with three home runs and 11 RBI. He was optioned to the Triple-A Oklahoma City RedHawks on August 15, 2014.

Hoes played in eight games for the Astros in 2015, going 4-for-15 (.267) with one RBI and one walk. On November 20, 2015, Hoes was designated for assignment after Houston added multiple prospects to the 40-man roster.

=== Baltimore Orioles (second stint) ===
On November 25, 2015, Houston traded Hoes to the Baltimore Orioles in exchange for cash considerations. On January 26, 2016, Hoes was designated for assignment by Baltimore to make room for Efren Navarro on the 40-man roster. He cleared waivers and was sent outright to the Norfolk Tides, the Orioles' Triple-A affiliate, on February 4. Playing in 102 games for Norfolk, Hoes slashed .242/.318/.331 with six home runs, 33 RBI, and eight stolen bases. He became a free agent following the season on November 7.

On February 24, 2017, Hoes was suspended for 50 games for a second positive drug test.

=== Southern Maryland Blue Crabs ===
On June 23, 2017, Hoes signed with the Southern Maryland Blue Crabs of the Atlantic League of Professional Baseball. He made 67 appearances for Southern Maryland, batting .312/.382/.402 with three home runs, 30 RBI, and six stolen bases. Hoes became a free agent after the season.

=== Baltimore Orioles (third stint) ===
On July 14, 2018, Hoes signed a minor league contract with the Baltimore Orioles. He did not appear for the organization and elected free agency following the season on November 2.
