= Rudy Owens =

American baseball player (born 1987)

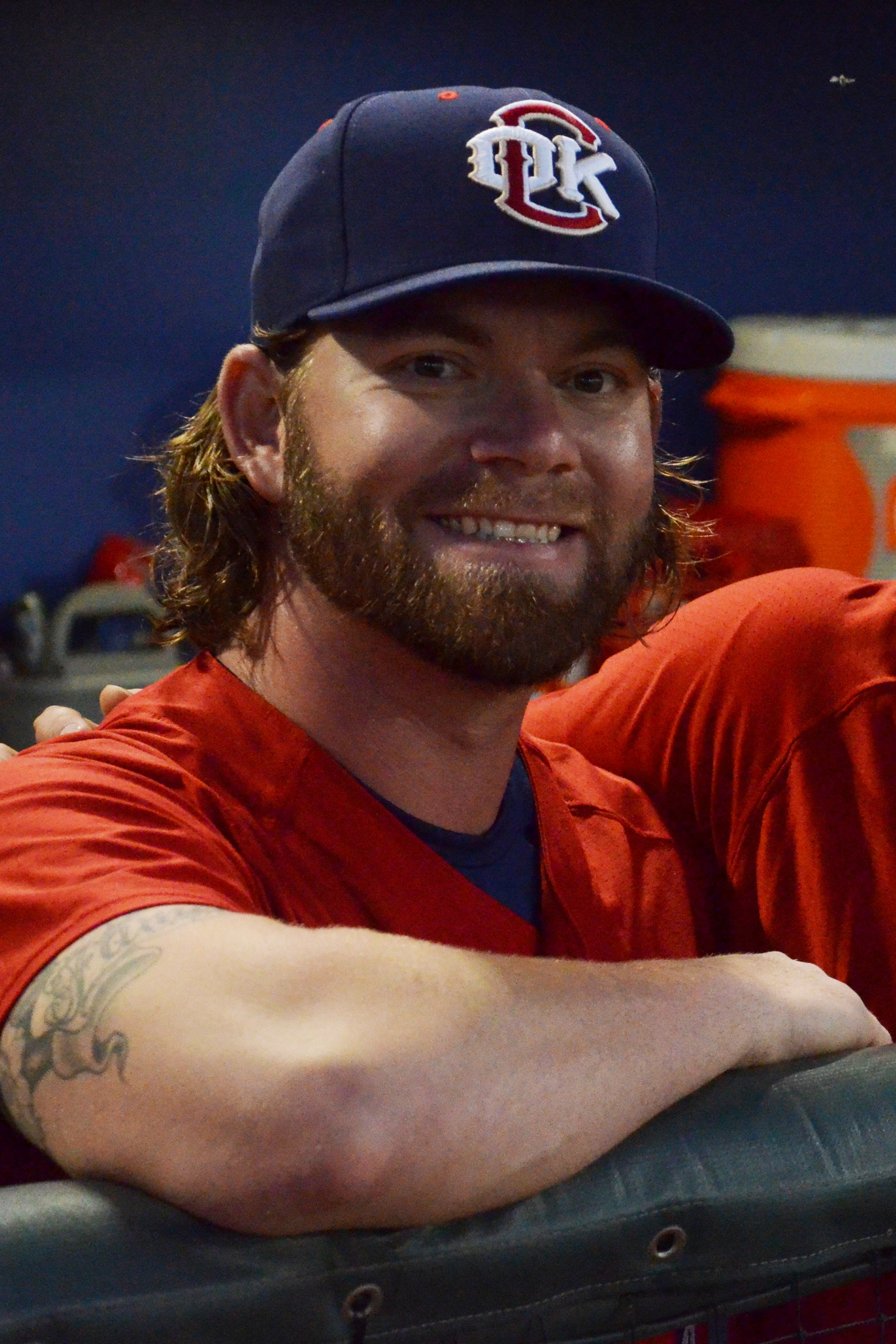
- Owens with the Oklahoma City RedHawks in 2014
- Pitcher
- Born: December 18, 1987 (age 38); Mesa, Arizona, U.S.
- Batted: Left Threw: Left

Professional debut
- MLB: May 23, 2014, for the Houston Astros
- CPBL: March 19, 2016, for the Chinatrust Brothers

Last appearance
- MLB: May 23, 2014, for the Houston Astros
- CPBL: May 17, 2016, for the Chinatrust Brothers

MLB statistics
- Win–loss record: 0–1
- Earned run average: 7.94
- Strikeouts: 1

CPBL statistics
- Win–loss record: 4–3
- Earned run average: 6.59
- Strikeouts: 52
- Stats at Baseball Reference

Teams
- Houston Astros (2014); Chinatrust Brothers (2016)

Rudy C. Owens (born December 18, 1987) is an American former professional baseball pitcher. He played in Major League Baseball (MLB) for the Houston Astros, and in the Chinese Professional Baseball League (CPBL) for the Chinatrust Brothers.

== Career ==
Owens attended Mesa High School in Mesa, Arizona, where he played for the school's baseball team.

=== Pittsburgh Pirates ===
The Pittsburgh Pirates drafted Owens out of Mesa in the 28th round (830th overall) of the 2006 Major League Baseball draft. After attending Chandler-Gilbert Community College for the 2007 college baseball season, he signed with the Pirates as a draft-and-follow prospect.

In 2009, Owens was named a Class-A All-Star, South Atlantic League (SAL) All-Star, and SAL Most Outstanding Pitcher after going 10-1 with a 1.70 ERA in 19 games. He was also named the Pittsburgh Pirates' Minor League Pitcher of the Year. In 2010, Owens was named an Eastern League All-Star and was again named the Pirates' Minor League Pitcher of the Year. The Pirates added him to their 40-man roster after the 2011 season to protect him from the Rule 5 draft.

=== Houston Astros ===
On July 24, 2012, Owens was traded alongside Robbie Grossman and Colton Cain to the Astros in exchange for Wandy Rodríguez. He spent the rest of the 2012 season with the Oklahoma City RedHawks, the Astros' Triple–A affiliate, and remained with the affiliate through 2013.

On May 23, 2014, the Astros recalled Owens from Triple–A Oklahoma City to make his Major League debut against the Seattle Mariners. On October 9, Owens was removed from the 40–man roster and sent outright to Oklahoma City.

=== Los Angeles Dodgers ===
Owens signed a minor league contract with the Oakland Athletics November 14, 2014.

Owens was traded to the Los Angeles Dodgers on April 4, 2015. He pitched in 11 games across three levels for the Dodgers organization and was 0–4 with a 3.89 ERA. The Dodgers released Owens on July 16.

=== Colorado Rockies ===
Owens signed a minor league deal with the Colorado Rockies on July 25, 2015. He made eight appearances (seven starts) for the Triple-A Albuquerque Isotopes, registering a 2-3 record and 6.17 ERA with 24 strikeouts over 35 innings of work.

=== Somerset Patriots ===
On June 15, 2016, Owens signed with the Somerset Patriots of the Atlantic League of Professional Baseball. In 12 appearances (11 starts) for the Patriots, Owens logged a 4-3 record and 4.01 ERA with 67 strikeouts across 67 1/3 innings pitched.

=== Fortitudo Baseball Bologna ===
On May 8, 2017, Owens signed with the Fortitudo Baseball Bologna of the Italian Baseball League. He made 14 starts for Bologna, compiling a 7-4 record and 2.58 ERA with 80 strikeouts across 73 1/3 innings pitched.
