= Jon Singleton (baseball) =

American baseball player (born 1991)

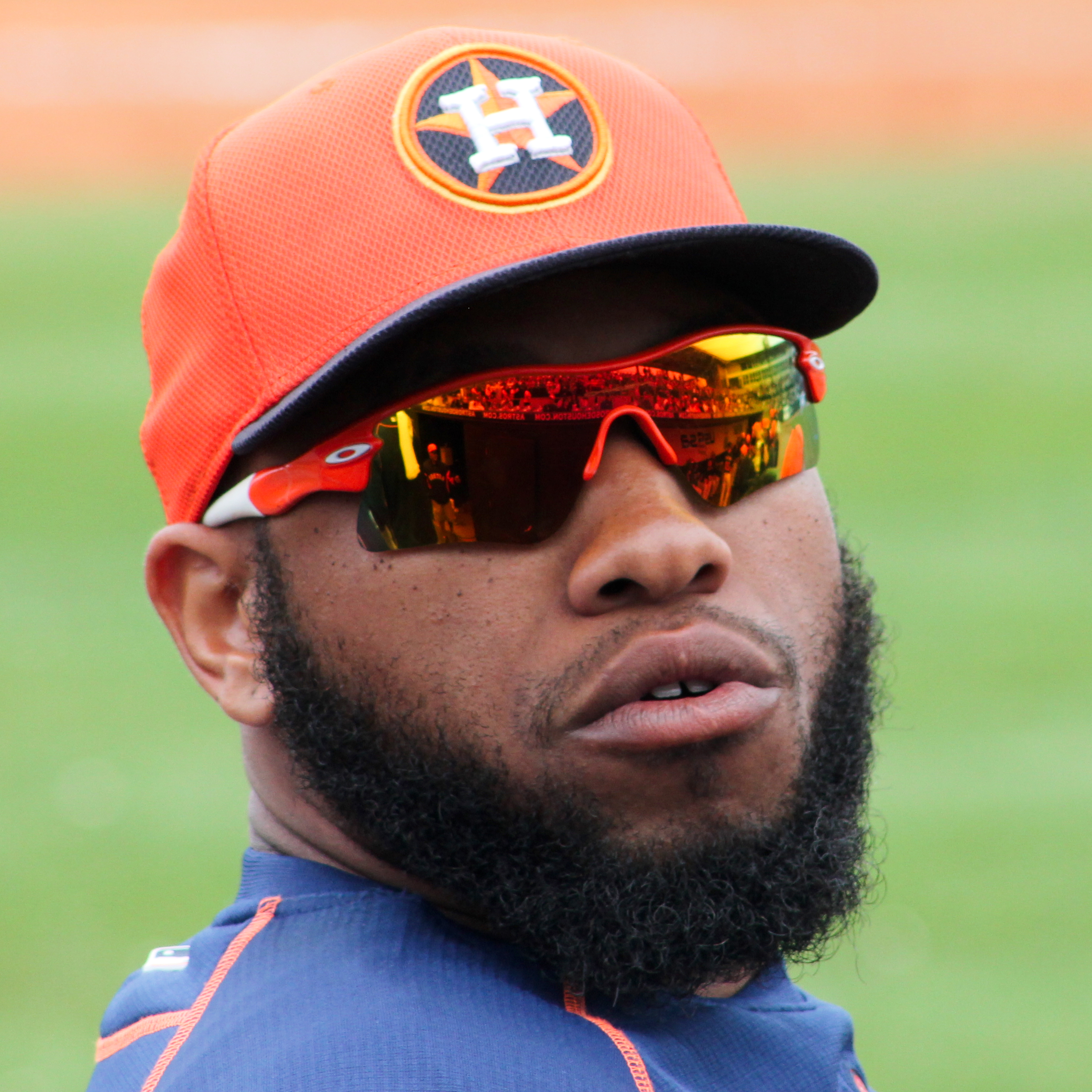
- Singleton with the Houston Astros in 2015

Diablos Rojos del México – No. 24
- First baseman
- Born: September 18, 1991 (age 34); Harbor City, California, U.S.
- Bats: Left Throws: Left

MLB debut
- June 3, 2014, for the Houston Astros

MLB statistics (through 2025 season)
- Batting average: .197
- Home runs: 29
- Runs batted in: 104
- Stats at Baseball Reference

Teams
- Houston Astros (2014–2015); Milwaukee Brewers (2023); Houston Astros (2023–2025)

Jonathan Lee Singleton (born September 18, 1991) is an American professional baseball first baseman for the Diablos Rojos del México of the Mexican League. He has previously played in Major League Baseball (MLB) for the Houston Astros and Milwaukee Brewers.

Singleton grew up in Long Beach, California, and was drafted by the Philadelphia Phillies in 2009. He was one of several prospects traded to the Astros in exchange for Hunter Pence in 2011. He signed a $10 million contract with the Astros before making his MLB debut in 2014, but he struggled, last playing for the Astros in 2015 before they relegated him to the minor leagues and released him in 2018.

After playing in the Mexican League, Singleton signed a minor league contract with the Brewers, for whom he returned to the major leagues in 2023.

== Early life ==
Singleton played baseball at Millikan High School in Long Beach, California. He committed to play at California State University, Long Beach a few months before the 2009 Major League Baseball draft.

== Career ==
=== Philadelphia Phillies ===
The Philadelphia Phillies drafted Singleton in the eighth round, with the 257th overall selection, of the 2009 Major League Baseball draft. He had been projected for selection as high as the second round of the draft, but his senior year statistics caused him to fall. Singleton reported to the Gulf Coast League Phillies, where he played 31 minor league games that year. He spent 2010 with the Single-A Lakewood BlueClaws, where he hit for a .290 batting average, 14 home runs and 77 runs batted in (RBI).

Prior to the 2011 season, Singleton was considered the Phillies' second best prospect by Baseball America.

=== Houston Astros ===
On July 29, 2011, the Phillies traded Singleton, Jarred Cosart, Josh Zeid, and Domingo Santana to the Houston Astros in exchange for Hunter Pence. Baseball America designated Singleton as Houston's top prospect following the 2011 season. He was named to appear in the 2012 All-Star Futures Game.

Singleton tested positive for marijuana in June 2012. He competed in the Arizona Fall League that offseason, and had a second positive test for marijuana in December. On January 9, 2013, Singleton was suspended for 50 games due to his second failed drug test. Singleton said that he had grown up around friends who used the drug and that he had been using it "on and off" since he was 14 years old. He spent a month in a rehabilitation center after the second failed test.

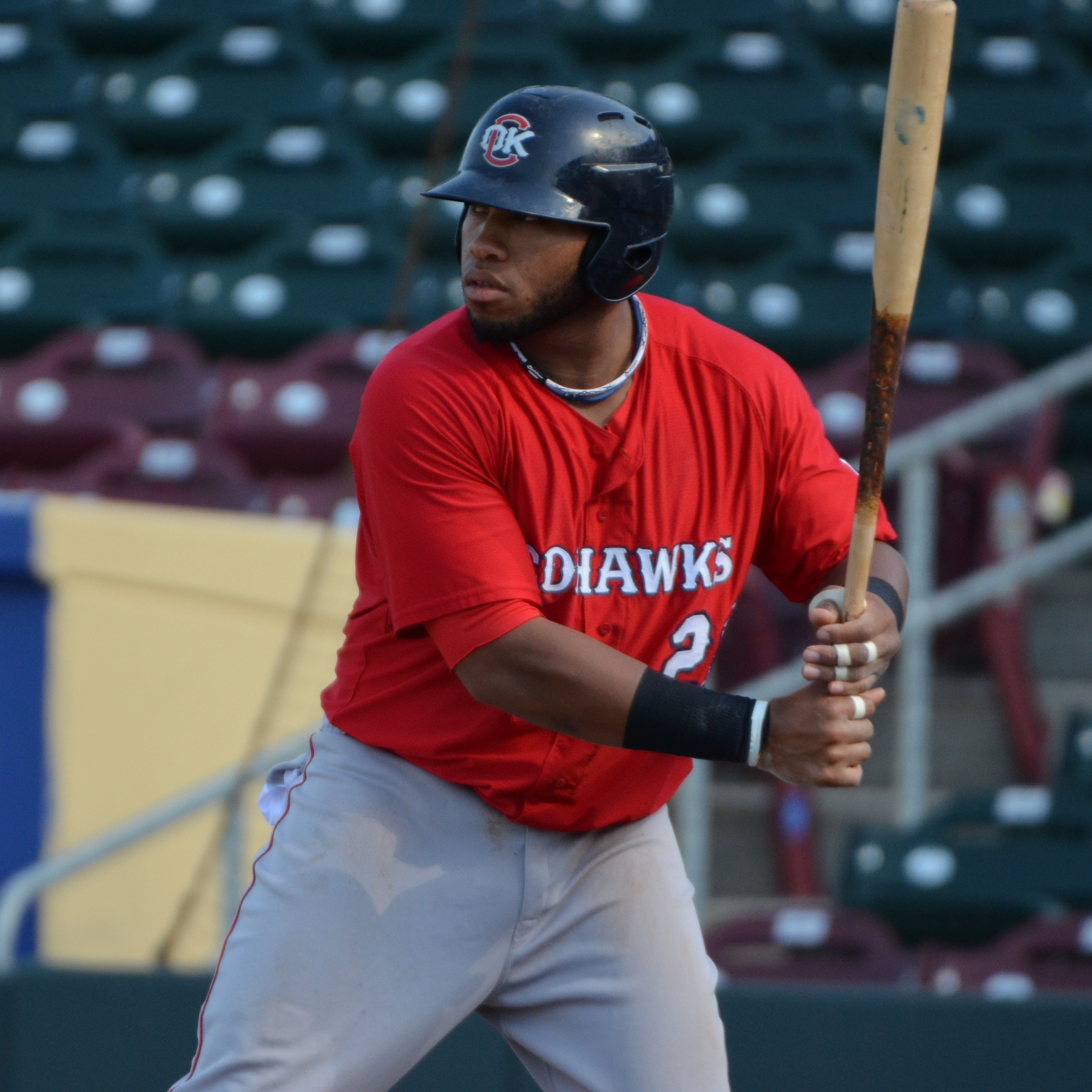
Singleton batting for the Oklahoma City RedHawks in 2013

Following the 2013 season, the Astros added Singleton to their 40-man roster. On June 2, 2014, the Astros signed Singleton to a 5-year contract that guaranteed him $10 million, and could have been worth as much as $35 million. The extension was the first to be signed by a drafted player with no major league experience. Singleton was promoted from the Oklahoma City RedHawks of the Triple-A Pacific Coast League (PCL) to make his major league debut on June 3.

Singleton made his major league debut for the Astros on June 3, 2014, against the Los Angeles Angels of Anaheim. In his first game, he went 1–3 with a home run, two RBIs, a walk, and two strikeouts. It was his first major league home run, a solo homer off of Matt Shoemaker. On June 8, Singleton lined his first career grand slam off of Glen Perkins of the Minnesota Twins at Target Field to help the Astros to a 14–5 win. Teammates Dexter Fowler, Chris Carter, and George Springer also homered. (Carter's was also a grand slam).

On August 2, 2014, Singleton hit an inside-the-park home run against the Toronto Blue Jays. It was initially ruled an out by the home plate umpire, but was later reversed following a challenge by Astros manager Bo Porter.

The Astros optioned Singleton to the Triple-A Fresno Grizzlies of the PCL to start the 2015 season. On May 13, 2015, Singleton recorded 10 RBIs, including a grand slam and two-run home run against the Albuquerque Isotopes. His 10-RBI game set a Fresno club record, and was one short of the modern-day PCL record, established by Mike Moustakas in 2010. Including the previous two games, Singleton smashed 4 home runs—two of which were grand slams—and 18 RBI over three games. Over a five-day span, Singleton collected 22 RBIs, including the 18 in Fresno's four-game series in Albuquerque from May 12–15.

On November 19, 2016, Singleton was placed on outright waivers by the Astros. He cleared waivers on November 22 and was assigned to Fresno. He played the 2017 season with the Corpus Christi Hooks of the Double-A Texas League, and led all minor leaguers with 500 or more plate appearances with a walk percentage of 21.4%.

In January 2018, MLB announced that Singleton had failed a third test for a drug of abuse and would be suspended for 100 games. In a statement to the Associated Press, Singleton admitted that he had a substance abuse problem: "At this point, it's pretty evident to me that I'm a drug addict. I don't openly tell everyone that, but it's pretty apparent to myself. I know that I enjoy smoking weed, I enjoy being high and I can't block that out of my mind that I enjoy that. So I have to work against that." On May 21, 2018, Singleton was released by the organization, while serving his suspension, during the final year of his contract.

=== Diablos Rojos del México ===
On April 2, 2020, Singleton signed with the Diablos Rojos del México of the Mexican League. He did not play that year due to the cancellation of the Mexican League due to the COVID-19 pandemic. On November 4, 2020, he was traded to the Guerreros de Oaxaca. On May 24, 2021, Singleton was traded back to the Diablos Rojos without appearing in a game for the Guerreros. He appeared in 46 games for México in 2021, batting .321/.503/.693 with 15 home runs, 36 RBI, and four stolen bases.

=== Milwaukee Brewers ===
On December 9, 2021, Singleton signed a minor league contract with the Milwaukee Brewers organization. He spent the 2022 season with the Triple-A Nashville Sounds, batting .219/.375/.434 in 456 at-bats, including 24 home runs and 87 RBIs. He led all of the minor leagues that year with 117 walks.

On November 15, 2022, the Brewers selected Singleton to their 40-man roster to protect him from the Rule 5 draft. On January 23, 2023, Singleton was designated for assignment after the signing of Brian Anderson was made official. He was released by the Brewers on January 26. On February 10, Singleton re-signed with the Brewers on a minor league contract. In 49 games for Nashville, Singleton hit .258/.384/.483 with 10 home runs and 29 RBI.

On June 3, 2023, the Brewers promoted Singleton to the major leagues following an injury to Darin Ruf. In 11 games for Milwaukee, he went 3–for–29 (.103) with 2 RBI. On June 17, Singleton was designated for assignment by the Brewers. After clearing waivers, he elected for free agency on June 21.

=== Houston Astros (second stint) ===
On June 24, 2023, Singleton rejoined the Houston Astros organization on a minor league contract and was subsequently assigned to the Triple-A Sugar Land Space Cowboys. He was called up to the majors on August 8, after a .333/.446/.692 performance over 33 games at Sugar Land, including 12 home runs, 28 RBI, 26 walks and 34 strikeouts. Singleton made his season debut the same day against the Baltimore Orioles at Oriole Park at Camden Yards. He pinch hit in the 9th inning against closer Félix Bautista, drew a walk, and scored on a go-ahead grand slam by Kyle Tucker that led to a 7–6 Astros win.

Making his return to Minute Maid Park for the first time since 2015, Singleton homered twice for his first career multi-home run game in the major leagues while driving in a career-high five runs to lead an 11–3 win over the Los Angeles Angels on August 11. (Note: Singleton's home runs were his first hit in the major leagues since July 29, 2015, in a 6–3 win over the Angels, constituting the longest gap of time for home runs hit by a position player since Rafael Belliard hit one after 10 years, 144 days in 1997, and the longest since pitcher Jake Peavy hit one after nine years, 52 days in 2015.)

On September 10, 2024, Singleton hit his first major league triple in a game against the Oakland Athletics at Minute Maid Park. In 2024, he batted .239/.321/.386 with 13 doubles, 13 home runs, and 42 RBI. Singleton also played in 119 games and accrued 405 plate appearances, both career highs.

On March 25, 2025, Singleton was released by the Astros after failing to make the team's Opening Day roster.

=== New York Mets ===
On April 2, 2025, Singleton signed a minor league contract with the New York Mets. In 55 appearances for the Triple-A Syracuse Mets, he batted .213/.353/.448 with 12 home runs and 42 RBI. Singleton was released by the Mets organization.

=== Houston Astros (third stint) ===
On June 22, 2025, Singleton signed a minor league contract with the Houston Astros organization. In 18 appearances for the Triple-A Sugar Land Space Cowboys, he batted .254/.427/.460 with four home runs, 12 RBI, and one stolen base. On July 20, Singleton was added to Houston's active roster following an injury to Isaac Paredes. After going 1-for-9 over three games for the team, Singleton was designated for assignment on July 28. He cleared waivers and elected free agency on July 31. On August 5, Singleton re-signed with Houston on a minor league contract. He elected free agency following the season on November 6.

=== Diablos Rojos del México (second stint) ===
On January 6, 2026, Singleton signed with the Diablos Rojos del México of the Mexican League.
