= 2013 Texas Rangers season =

2013 Texas Rangers
- Cap insignia for the 2013 Texas Rangers
- League: American League
- Division: West
- Ballpark: Rangers Ballpark in Arlington
- City: Arlington, Texas
- Record: 91–72 (.558)
- Divisional place: 2nd
- Owners: Rangers Baseball Express (Nolan Ryan, Ray Davis and Bob R. Simpson)
- General managers: Jon Daniels
- Managers: Ron Washington
- Television: Fox Sports Southwest; KTXA (Steve Busby, Tom Grieve)
- Radio: KESN ESPN Radio 103.3 FM (English) (Eric Nadel, Matt Hicks); KZMP 1540 AM (Spanish) (Eleno Orlenas, Jerry Romo)
- Stats: ESPN.com; Baseball Reference

The 2013 Texas Rangers season was the Rangers' 53rd season of the franchise and the 42nd since the team relocated to Arlington, Texas. The Rangers lost a season ending tie-breaking game against the Tampa Bay Rays on September 30, 2013, and were eliminated from playoff contention for the first time since 2009.

== Season standings ==
=== American League West ===
AL West
Team	W	L	Pct.	GB	Home	Road
Oakland Athletics	96	66	.593	—	52‍–‍29	44‍–‍37
Texas Rangers	91	72	.558	5½	46‍–‍36	45‍–‍36
Los Angeles Angels of Anaheim	78	84	.481	18	39‍–‍42	39‍–‍42
Seattle Mariners	71	91	.438	25	36‍–‍45	35‍–‍46
Houston Astros	51	111	.315	45	24‍–‍57	27‍–‍54

=== American League Wild Card ===
Division winners
Team	W	L	Pct.
Boston Red Sox	97	65	.599
Oakland Athletics	96	66	.593
Detroit Tigers	93	69	.574

Wild Card teams (Top 2 teams qualify for postseason)
Team	W	L	Pct.	GB
Cleveland Indians	92	70	.568	+½
Tampa Bay Rays	92	71	.564	—
Texas Rangers	91	72	.558	1
Kansas City Royals	86	76	.531	5½
New York Yankees	85	77	.525	6½
Baltimore Orioles	85	77	.525	6½
Los Angeles Angels of Anaheim	78	84	.481	13½
Toronto Blue Jays	74	88	.457	17½
Seattle Mariners	71	91	.438	20½
Minnesota Twins	66	96	.407	25½
Chicago White Sox	63	99	.389	28½
Houston Astros	51	111	.315	40½

The 2013 Rangers are to date the winningest team not to make the postseason in the expanded Wild Card era.

=== Record vs. opponents ===
2013 American League record Source: MLB Standings Grid – 2013
Team	BAL	BOS	CWS	CLE	DET	HOU	KC	LAA	MIN	NYY	OAK	SEA	TB	TEX	TOR	NL
Baltimore	—	11–8	4–3	3–4	4–2	4–2	3–4	5–2	3–3	9–10	5–2	2–4	6–13	5–2	10–9	11–9
Boston	8–11	—	4–2	6–1	3–4	6–1	2–5	3–3	4–3	13–6	3–3	6–1	12–7	2–4	11–8	14–6
Chicago	3–4	2–4	—	2–17	7–12	3–4	9–10	3–4	8–11	3–3	2–5	3–3	2–5	4–2	4–3	8–12
Cleveland	4–3	1–6	17–2	—	4–15	6–1	10–9	4–2	13–6	1–6	5–2	5–2	2–4	5–1	4–2	11–9
Detroit	2–4	4–3	12–7	15–4	—	6–1	9–10	0–6	11–8	3–3	3–4	5–2	3–3	3–4	5–2	12–8
Houston	2–4	1–6	4–3	1–6	1–6	—	2–4	10–9	1–5	1–5	4–15	9–10	2–5	2–17	3–4	8–12
Kansas City	4–3	5–2	10–9	9–10	10–9	4–2	—	2–5	15–4	2–5	1–5	4–3	6–1	3–3	2–4	9–11
Los Angeles	2–5	3–3	4–3	2–4	6–0	9–10	5–2	—	1–5	3–4	8–11	11–8	4–3	4–15	6–1	10–10
Minnesota	3–3	3–4	11–8	6–13	8–11	5–1	4–15	5–1	—	2–5	1–6	4–3	1–6	4–3	1–5	8–12
New York	10–9	6–13	3–3	6–1	3–3	5–1	5–2	4–3	5–2	—	1–5	4–3	7–12	3–4	14–5	9–11
Oakland	2–5	3–3	5–2	2–5	4–3	15–4	5–1	11–8	6–1	5–1	—	8–11	3–3	10–9	4–3	13–7
Seattle	4–2	1–6	3–3	2–5	2–5	10–9	3–4	8–11	3–4	3–4	11–8	—	3–3	7–12	3–3	8–12
Tampa Bay	13–6	7–12	5–2	4–2	3–3	5–2	1–6	3–4	6–1	12–7	3–3	3–3	—	4–4	11–8	12–8
Texas	2–5	4–2	2–4	1–5	4–3	17–2	3–3	15–4	3–4	4–3	9–10	12–7	4–4	—	1–6	10–10
Toronto	9–10	8–11	3–4	2–4	2–5	4–3	4–2	1–6	5–1	5–14	3–4	3–3	8–11	6–1	—	11–9

=== Game log ===
Legend

Rangers Win
Rangers Loss
Game postponed

2013 Game Log
March (0–1)

#	Date	Opponent	Score	Win	Loss	Save	Record
1	March 31	@ Astros	2–8	Bud Norris (1–0)	Matt Harrison (0-1)	Érik Bédard (1)	0–1

April (17–8)

#	Date	Opponent	Score	Win	Loss	Save	Record
2	April 2	@ Astros	7–0	Yu Darvish (1–0)	Lucas Harrell (0–1)	None	1–1
3	April 3	@ Astros	4–0	Alexi Ogando (1–0)	Philip Humber (0–1)	None	2–1
4	April 5	Angels	3–2	Tanner Scheppers (1–0)	Scott Downs (0–2)	Joe Nathan (1)	3–1
5	April 6	Angels	4–8	Tommy Hanson (1–0)	Matt Harrison (0–2)	None	3–2
6	April 7	Angels	7–3	Yu Darvish (2–0)	Jered Weaver (0–1)	None	4–2
7	April 8	Rays	5–4	Alexi Ogando (2–0)	Jeremy Hellickson (0–1)	Joe Nathan (2)	5–2
8	April 9	Rays	6–1	Nick Tepesch (1–0)	Roberto Hernández (0–2)	None	6–2
9	April 10	Rays	0–2	Matt Moore (2–0)	Derek Holland (0–1)	Fernando Rodney (1)	6–3
10	April 11	@ Mariners	4–3	Joseph Ortiz (1–0)	Félix Hernández (1–2)	Joe Nathan (3)	7–3
11	April 12	@ Mariners	1–3	Hisashi Iwakuma (2–0)	Yu Darvish (2–1)	Tom Wilhelmsen (4)	7–4
12	April 13	@ Mariners	3–1	Joseph Ortiz (2–0)	Carter Capps (0–1)	Joe Nathan (4)	8–4
13	April 14	@ Mariners	3–4	Brandon Maurer (1–2)	Nick Tepesch (1–1)	Tom Wilhelmsen (5)	8–5
14	April 16	@ Cubs	4–2	Derek Holland (1–1)	Travis Wood (1–1)	Joe Nathan (5)	9–5
–	April 17	@ Cubs	Postponed (rain); Makeup: May 6				
15	April 18	@ Cubs	2–6	Carlos Villanueva (1–0)	Alexi Ogando (2–1)	None	9–6
16	April 19	Mariners	7–0	Yu Darvish (3–1)	Joe Saunders (1–2)	None	10–6
17	April 20	Mariners	5–0	Derek Lowe (1–0)	Brandon Maurer (1–3)	None	11–6
18	April 21	Mariners	11–3	Justin Grimm (1–0)	Aaron Harang (0–2)	Michael Kirkman (1)	12–6
19	April 22	@ Angels	7–6	Tanner Scheppers (2–0)	Ernesto Frieri (0–1)	Joe Nathan (6)	13–6
20	April 23	@ Angels	4–5 (11)	Dane De La Rosa (1–0)	Joseph Ortiz (2–1)	None	13–7
21	April 24	@ Angels	11–3	Yu Darvish (4–1)	Michael Roth (1–1)	None	14–7
22	April 25	@ Twins	2–1	Nick Tepesch (2–1)	Vance Worley (0–3)	Joe Nathan (7)	15–7
23	April 26	@ Twins	4–3	Justin Grimm (2–0)	Scott Diamond (1–2)	Joe Nathan (8)	16–7
24	April 27	@ Twins	2–7	Pedro Hernández (1–0)	Derek Holland (1–2)	None	16–8
25	April 28	@ Twins	0–5	Kevin Correia (3–1)	Alexi Ogando (2–2)	None	16–9
26	April 30	White Sox	10–6	Yu Darvish (5–1)	Matt Lindstrom (1–2)	None	17–9

May (17–11)

#	Date	Opponent	Score	Win	Loss	Save	Record
27	May 1	White Sox	2–5	Chris Sale (3–2)	Nick Tepesch (2–2)	Addison Reed (9)	17–10
28	May 2	White Sox	1–3	Hector Santiago (1–1)	Justin Grimm (2–1)	Addison Reed (10)	17–11
29	May 3	Red Sox	7–0	Derek Holland (2–2)	Félix Doubront (3–1)	None	18–11
30	May 4	Red Sox	5–1	Alexi Ogando (3–2)	John Lackey (1–2)	None	19–11
31	May 5	Red Sox	4–3	Joe Nathan (1–0)	Clayton Mortensen (0–2)	None	20–11
32	May 6	@ Cubs	2–9	Scott Feldman (3–3)	Nick Tepesch (2–3)	None	20–12
33	May 7	@ Brewers	3–6	Wily Peralta (3–2)	Justin Grimm (2–2)	Jim Henderson (7)	20–13
34	May 8	@ Brewers	4–1	Derek Holland (3–2)	Kyle Lohse (1–4)	Joe Nathan (9)	21–13
35	May 10	@ Astros	4–2	Robbie Ross (1–0)	Wesley Wright (0–1)	Joe Nathan (10)	22–13
36	May 11	@ Astros	8–7	Yu Darvish (6–1)	Philip Humber (0–8)	Joe Nathan (11)	23–13
37	May 12	@ Astros	12–7	Nick Tepesch (3–3)	Jordan Lyles (1–1)	None	24–13
38	May 13	@ Athletics	5–1	A. J. Griffin (4–3)	Justin Grimm (2–3)	None	24–14
39	May 14	@ Athletics	6–5 (10)	Tanner Scheppers (3–0)	Chris Resop (1–1)	Joe Nathan (12)	25–14
40	May 15	@ Athletics	6–2	Alexi Ogando (4–2)	Dan Straily (1–2)	None	26–14
41	May 16	Tigers	10–4	Yu Darvish (7–1)	Justin Verlander (4–4)	None	27–14
42	May 17	Tigers	1–2	Rick Porcello (2–2)	Nick Tepesch (3–4)	José Valverde (4)	27–15
43	May 18	Tigers	7–2	Justin Grimm (3–3)	Aníbal Sánchez (4–4)	None	28–15
44	May 19	Tigers	11–8	Robbie Ross (2–0)	José Ortega (0–1)	Joe Nathan (13)	29-15
45	May 20	Athletics	2–9	Bartolo Colón (4–2)	Josh Lindblom (0–1)	None	29–16
46	May 21	Athletics	0–1	Dan Straily (2–2)	Yu Darvish (7–2)	Grant Balfour (9)	29–17
47	May 22	Athletics	3–1	Ross Wolf (1–0)	Jarrod Parker (2–6)	Joe Nathan (14)	30–17
48	May 24	@ Mariners	9–5	Justin Grimm (4–3)	Joe Saunders (3–5)	Joe Nathan (15)	31–17
49	May 25	@ Mariners	5–2	Derek Holland (4–2)	Félix Hernández (5–4)	Joe Nathan (16)	32–17
50	May 26	@ Mariners	3–4 (13)	Yoervis Medina (1–0)	Michael Kirkman (0–1)	None	32–18
51	May 27 (1)	@ Diamondbacks	3–5	Tyler Skaggs (1–0)	Martín Pérez (0–1)	Heath Bell (9)	32–19
52	May 27 (2)	@ Diamondbacks	4–5	Brad Ziegler (2–1)	Jason Frasor (0–1)	None	32–20
–	May 29	Diamondbacks	Postponed (rain); Makeup: August 1				
53	May 30	Diamondbacks	9–5	Justin Grimm (5–3)	Brandon McCarthy (2–4)	None	33–20
54	May 31	Royals	7–2	Derek Holland (5–2)	Wade Davis (3–5)	None	34–20

June (14–14)

#	Date	Opponent	Score	Win	Loss	Save	Record
55	June 1	Royals	1–4 (10)	Aaron Crow (1–1)	Robbie Ross (2–1)	Greg Holland (9)	34–21
56	June 2	Royals	3–1	Tanner Scheppers (4–0)	J. C. Gutiérrez (0–1)	Joe Nathan (17)	35–21
57	June 4	@ Red Sox	5–17	Ryan Dempster (3–6)	Justin Grimm (5–4)	None	35–22
58	June 5	@ Red Sox	3–2	Neal Cotts (1–0)	Craig Breslow (2–1)	Joe Nathan (18)	36–22
59	June 6	@ Red Sox	3–6	Andrew Bailey (2–0)	Michael Kirkman (0–2)	None	36–23
60	June 7	@ Blue Jays	1–6	Neil Wagner (1–0)	Nick Tepesch (3–5)	None	36–24
61	June 8	@ Blue Jays	3–4 (18)	Aaron Loup (3–3)	Ross Wolf (1–1)	None	36–25
62	June 9	@ Blue Jays	6–4	Neal Cotts (2–0)	Neil Wagner (1–1)	Joe Nathan (19)	37–25
63	June 10	Indians	6–3	Robbie Ross (3–1)	Scott Kazmir (3–4)	Joe Nathan (20)	38–25
64	June 11	Indians	2–5	Corey Kluber (4–4)	Derek Holland (5–3)	None	38–26
65	June 12	Indians	2–5	Ubaldo Jiménez (5–4)	Nick Tepesch (3–6)	None	38–27
66	June 13	Blue Jays	1–3	Esmil Rogers (2–2)	Neal Cotts (2–1)	Casey Janssen (14)	38–28
67	June 14	Blue Jays	0–8	Mark Buehrle (3–4)	Justin Grimm (5–5)	None	38–29
68	June 15	Blue Jays	1–6	R. A. Dickey (6–8)	Josh Lindblom (0–2)	None	38–30
69	June 16	Blue Jays	2–7	Chien-Ming Wang (1–0)	Derek Holland (5–4)	None	38–31
70	June 17	Athletics	8–7	Neal Cotts (3–1)	Jesse Chavez (1–1)	Joe Nathan (21)	39–31
71	June 18	Athletics	2–6	Jarrod Parker (6–6)	Yu Darvish (7–3)	None	39–32
72	June 19	Athletics	9–4	Justin Grimm (6–5)	Tommy Milone (6–7)	None	40–32
73	June 20	Athletics	4–3	Tanner Scheppers (5–0)	Sean Doolittle (3–2)	Joe Nathan (22)	41–32
74	June 21	@ Cardinals	6–4	Neal Cotts (4–1)	Trevor Rosenthal (1–1)	Joe Nathan (23)	42–32
75	June 22	@ Cardinals	4–2	Martín Pérez (1–1)	Shelby Miller (8–5)	Joe Nathan (24)	43–32
76	June 23	@ Cardinals	2–1	Robbie Ross (4–1)	Adam Wainwright (10–5)	Joe Nathan (25)	44–32
77	June 25	@ Yankees	3–4	Mariano Rivera (1–1)	Tanner Scheppers (5–1)	None	44–33
78	June 26	@ Yankees	8–5	Justin Grimm (7–5)	Andy Pettitte (5–6)	Joe Nathan (26)	45–33
79	June 27	@ Yankees	2–0	Derek Holland (6–4)	Phil Hughes (3–7)	None	46–33
80	June 28	Reds	4–0	Martín Pérez (2–1)	Johnny Cueto (4–2)	None	47–33
81	June 29	Reds	4–6 (11)	J. J. Hoover (1–5)	Kyle McClellan (0–1)	Aroldis Chapman (20)	47–34
82	June 30	Reds	3–2	Yu Darvish (8–3)	Mat Latos (7–2)	Joe Nathan (27)	48–34

July (11–15)

#	Date	Opponent	Score	Win	Loss	Save	Record
83	July 2	Mariners	2–9	Joe Saunders (6–8)	Justin Grimm (7–6)	None	48–35
84	July 3	Mariners	2–4 (10)	Charlie Furbush (2–4)	Robbie Ross (4–2)	Tom Wilhelmsen (17)	48–36
85	July 4	Mariners	5–4	Josh Lindblom (1–2)	Hisashi Iwakuma (7–4)	Joe Nathan (28)	49–36
86	July 5	Astros	10–5	Nick Tepesch (4–6)	Lucas Harrell (5–9)	None	50–36
87	July 6	Astros	5–9	Travis Blackley (1–0)	Yu Darvish (8–4)	None	50–37
88	July 7	Astros	5–4	Cory Burns (1–0)	Érik Bédard (3–5)	Joe Nathan (29)	51–37
89	July 8	@ Orioles	8–5	Derek Holland (7–4)	Scott Feldman (7–7)	Joe Nathan (30)	52–37
90	July 9	@ Orioles	8–4	Martín Pérez (3–1)	Zach Britton (2–3)	None	53–37
91	July 10	@ Orioles	1–6	Wei-Yin Chen (4–3)	Josh Lindblom (1–3)	None	53–38
92	July 11	@ Orioles	1–3	Miguel González (7–3)	Ross Wolf (1–2)	Jim Johnson (31)	53–39
93	July 12	@ Tigers	2–7	Doug Fister (7–5)	Justin Grimm (7–7)	None	53–40
94	July 13	@ Tigers	7–1	Derek Holland (8–4)	Max Scherzer (13–1)	None	54–40
95	July 14	@ Tigers	0–5	Justin Verlander (10–6)	Martín Pérez (3–2)	None	54–41
–	July 16	All-Star Break: AL defeats NL 3–0					
96	July 19	Orioles	1–3	Wei-Yin Chen (5–3)	Derek Holland (8–5)	Jim Johnson (34)	54–42
97	July 20	Orioles	4–7	Miguel González (8–3)	Ross Wolf (1–3)	Jim Johnson (35)	54–43
98	July 21	Orioles	2–4	Chris Tillman (12–3)	Martín Pérez (3–3)	Darren O'Day (2)	54–44
99	July 22	Yankees	3–0	Yu Darvish (9–4)	Iván Nova (4–3)	Joe Nathan (31)	55–44
100	July 23	Yankees	4–5	Joba Chamberlain (2–0)	Joe Nathan (1–1)	Mariano Rivera (32)	55–45
101	July 24	Yankees	3–1	Matt Garza (7–1)	Andy Pettitte (7–8)	Joe Nathan (32)	56–45
102	July 25	Yankees	0–2	Hiroki Kuroda (10–6)	Derek Holland (8–6)	Mariano Rivera (33)	56–46
103	July 26	@ Indians	8–11 (11)	Bryan Shaw (1–2)	Jason Frasor (0–2)	None	56–47
104	July 27	@ Indians	0–1	Justin Masterson (12–7)	Yu Darvish (9–5)	Chris Perez (14)	56–48
105	July 28	@ Indians	0–6	Ubaldo Jiménez (8–5)	Alexi Ogando (4–3)	None	56–49
106	July 29	Angels	4–3	Jason Frasor (1–2)	Ernesto Frieri (0–3)	None	57–49
107	July 30	Angels	14–11 (10)	Joe Nathan (2–1)	Daniel Stange (0–1)	None	58–49
108	July 31	Angels	2–1	Joe Nathan (3–1)	Michael Kohn (1–1)	None	59–49

August (20–7)

#	Date	Opponent	Score	Win	Loss	Save	Record
109	August 1	Diamondbacks	7–1	Yu Darvish (10–5)	Zeke Spruill (0–1)	None	60–49
110	August 2	@ Athletics	8–3	Jason Frasor (2–2)	Tommy Milone (9–9)	None	61–49
111	August 3	@ Athletics	2–4	Jarrod Parker (7–6)	Matt Garza (7–2)	Grant Balfour (29)	61–50
112	August 4	@ Athletics	4–0	Derek Holland (9–6)	A. J. Griffin (10–8)	None	62–50
113	August 5	@ Angels	5–2	Martín Pérez (4–3)	Jerome Williams (5–8)	Joe Nathan (33)	63–50
114	August 6	@ Angels	8–3	Yu Darvish (11–5)	Kevin Jepsen (1–5)	Tanner Scheppers (1)	64–50
115	August 7	@ Angels	10–3	Alexi Ogando (5–3)	Tommy Hanson (4–3)	None	65–50
116	August 9	@ Astros	9–5	Matt Garza (8–2)	Josh Zeid (0–1)	Neal Cotts (1)	66–50
117	August 10	@ Astros	5–4	Jason Frasor (3–2)	Lucas Harrell (5–13)	Joe Nathan (34)	67–50
118	August 11	@ Astros	6–1	Martín Pérez (5–3)	Dallas Keuchel (5–7)	None	68–50
119	August 12	@ Astros	2–1	Yu Darvish (12–5)	Brett Oberholtzer (2–1)	Joe Nathan (35)	69–50
120	August 13	Brewers	1–5	Marco Estrada (5–4)	Alexi Ogando (5–4)	Jim Henderson (17)	69–51
121	August 14	Brewers	5–4	Jason Frasor (4–2)	John Axford (5–6)	Joe Nathan (36)	70–51
122	August 16	Mariners	1–3	Hisashi Iwakuma (11–6)	Neal Cotts (4–2)	Danny Farquhar (6)	70–52
123	August 17	Mariners	15–3	Martín Pérez (6–3)	Félix Hernández (12–6)	None	71–52
124	August 18	Mariners	3–4	Yoervis Medina (4–3)	Joe Nathan (3–2)	Danny Farquhar (7)	71–53
125	August 19	Astros	16–5	Matt Garza (9–2)	Lucas Harrell (6–14)	None	72–53
126	August 20	Astros	4–2	Neal Cotts (5–2)	Jarred Cosart (1–1)	Joe Nathan (37)	73–53
127	August 21	Astros	5–4	Joe Nathan (4–2)	Chia-Jen Lo (0–1)	None	74–53
128	August 23	@ White Sox	11–5	Martín Pérez (7–3)	Chris Sale (9–12)	None	75–53
129	August 24	@ White Sox	2–3	Nate Jones (4–4)	Tanner Scheppers (5–2)	None	75–54
130	August 25	@ White Sox	2–5	John Danks (4–10)	Matt Garza (9–3)	Addison Reed (35)	75–55
131	August 26	@ Mariners	8–3	Travis Blackley (2–1)	Joe Saunders (10–13)	None	76–55
132	August 27	@ Mariners	4–3 (10)	Tanner Scheppers (6–2)	Danny Farquhar (0–2)	Joe Nathan (38)	77–55
133	August 28	@ Mariners	12–4	Martín Pérez (8–3)	Félix Hernández (12–8)	None	78–55
134	August 30	Twins	2–3	Liam Hendriks (1–2)	Yu Darvish (12–6)	Glen Perkins (31)	78–56
135	August 31	Twins	2–1	Joe Nathan (5–2)	Caleb Thielbar (2–2)	None	79–56

September (12–15)

#	Date	Opponent	Score	Win	Loss	Save	Record
136	September 1	Twins	2–4	Kevin Correia (9–10)	Travis Blackley (2–2)	Glen Perkins (32)	79–57
137	September 2	@ Athletics	2–4	Dan Straily (8–7)	Derek Holland (9–7)	Grant Balfour (36)	79–58
138	September 3	@ Athletics	5–1	Martín Pérez (9–3)	Bartolo Colón (14–6)	None	80–58
139	September 4	@ Athletics	4–11	Jarrod Parker (11–6)	Yu Darvish (12–7)	Brett Anderson (2)	80–59
140	September 6	@ Angels	5–6	C. J. Wilson (15–6)	Matt Garza (9–4)	Ernesto Frieri (31)	80–60
141	September 7	@ Angels	3–8	Garrett Richards (6–6)	Derek Holland (9–8)	None	80–61
142	September 8	@ Angels	4–3	Alexi Ogando (6–4)	Michael Kohn (1–2)	Joe Nathan (39)	81–61
143	September 9	Pirates	0–1	Gerrit Cole (7–7)	Yu Darvish (12–8)	Mark Melancon (12)	81–62
144	September 10	Pirates	4–5	Francisco Liriano (16–7)	Martín Pérez (9–4)	Mark Melancon (13)	81–63
145	September 11	Pirates	5–7	A. J. Burnett (8–10)	Matt Garza (9–5)	Kyle Farnsworth (1)	81–64
146	September 13	Athletics	8–9	Dan Straily (10–7)	Derek Holland (9–9)	Sean Doolittle (2)	81–65
147	September 14	Athletics	0–1	Bartolo Colón (16–6)	Yu Darvish (12–9)	Grant Balfour (38)	81–66
148	September 15	Athletics	1–5	Tommy Milone (11–9)	Martín Pérez (9–5)	None	81–67
149	September 16	@ Rays	2–6	Alex Cobb (9–3)	Matt Garza (9–6)	None	81–68
150	September 17	@ Rays	7–1	Alexi Ogando (7–4)	Jeremy Hellickson (11–9)	None	82–68
151	September 18	@ Rays	3–4 (12)	Brandon Gomes (2–1)	Joseph Ortiz (2–2)	None	82–69
152	September 19	@ Rays	8–2	Yu Darvish (13–9)	Matt Moore (15–4)	None	83–69
153	September 20	@ Royals	1–2	Luke Hochevar (5–2)	Jason Frasor (4–3)	Greg Holland (44)	83–70
154	September 21	@ Royals	3–1	Matt Garza (10–6)	Jeremy Guthrie (14–12)	Joe Nathan (40)	84–70
155	September 22	@ Royals	0–4 (10)	Tim Collins (3–6)	Neal Cotts (5–3)	None	84–71
156	September 23	Astros	12–0	Derek Holland (10–9)	Jordan Lyles (7–9)	None	85–71
157	September 24	Astros	3–2	Neal Cotts (6–3)	Brad Peacock (5–6)	Joe Nathan (41)	86–71
158	September 25	Astros	7–3	Martín Pérez (10–5)	Dallas Keuchel (6–10)	None	87–71
159	September 26	Angels	6–5	Joe Nathan (6–2)	Michael Kohn (1–4)	None	88–71
160	September 27	Angels	5–3	Neal Cotts (7–3)	Juan Gutiérrez (1–5)	Joe Nathan (42)	89–71
161	September 28	Angels	7–4	Joakim Soria (1–0)	Garrett Richards (7–8)	Joe Nathan (43)	90–71
162	September 29	Angels	6–2	Neal Cotts (8–3)	Jason Vargas (9–8)	None	91–71
163	September 30	Rays	2–5	David Price (10–8)	Martín Pérez (10–6)	None	91–72

== Roster ==
2013 Texas Rangers
Roster
Pitchers: 59 Travis Blackley; 57 Cory Burns; 56 Neal Cotts; 11 Yu Darvish; 30 Neftalí Feliz; 53 Wilmer Font; 44 Jason Frasor; 22 Matt Garza; 51 Justin Grimm; 54 Matt Harrison; 45 Derek Holland; 50 Michael Kirkman; 25 Josh Lindblom; 55 Derek Lowe; 37 Kyle McClellan; 36 Joe Nathan; 41 Alexi Ogando; 58 Joseph Ortiz; 33 Martín Pérez; 46 Robbie Ross; 52 Tanner Scheppers; 28 Joakim Soria; 49 Nick Tepesch; 55 Ross Wolf	Catchers: 12 A. J. Pierzynski; 8 Geovany Soto; Infielders: 1 Elvis Andrus; 15 Jeff Baker; 29 Adrián Beltré; 27 Lance Berkman; 61 Robinson Chirinos; 3 Leury García; 5 Ian Kinsler; 21 Chris McGuiness; 18 Mitch Moreland; 13 Jurickson Profar; 9 Adam Rosales; Outfielders: 35 Jim Adduci; 43 Engel Beltré; 20 Joey Butler; 17 Nelson Cruz; 23 Craig Gentry; 2 Leonys Martín; 7 David Murphy; 51 Alex Ríos; Other batters: 20 Julio Borbon	Manager: 38 Ron Washington; Coaches: 16 Dave Anderson (first base); 66 Josh Frasier (bullpen catcher); 40 Andy Hawkins (bullpen); 31 Mike Maddux (pitching); 14 Dave Magadan (hitting); 4 Jackie Moore (bench); 24 Gary Pettis (third base)

== Player stats ==
=== Batting ===
Note: G = Games played; AB = At bats; R = Runs; H = Hits; 2B = Doubles; 3B = Triples; HR = Home runs; RBI = Runs batted in; SB = Stolen bases; BB = Walks; AVG = Batting average; SLG = Slugging average

Player	G	AB	R	H	2B	3B	HR	RBI	SB	BB	AVG	SLG
Adrián Beltré	161	631	88	199	32	0	30	92	1	50	.315	.509
Elvis Andrus	156	620	91	168	17	4	4	67	42	52	.271	.331
Ian Kinsler	136	545	85	151	31	2	13	72	15	51	.277	.413
A. J. Pierzynski	134	503	48	137	24	1	17	70	1	11	.272	.425
Mitch Moreland	147	462	60	107	24	1	23	60	0	45	.232	.437
Leonys Martin	147	457	66	119	21	6	8	49	36	28	.260	.385
David Murphy	142	436	51	96	26	1	13	45	1	37	.220	.374
Nelson Cruz	109	413	49	110	18	0	27	76	5	35	.266	.506
Jurickson Profar	85	286	30	67	11	0	6	26	2	26	.234	.336
Lance Berkman	73	256	27	62	10	1	6	34	0	38	.242	.359
Craig Gentry	106	246	39	69	12	4	2	22	24	29	.280	.386
Alex Ríos	47	186	26	52	11	2	6	26	16	9	.280	.386
Geovany Soto	54	163	20	40	9	0	9	22	1	20	.245	.466
Jeff Baker	74	154	21	43	8	0	11	21	1	18	.279	.545
Leury García	25	52	8	10	0	1	0	1	1	3	.192	.231
Engel Beltré	22	40	7	10	1	0	0	2	1	0	.250	.275
Chris McGuiness	10	34	0	6	1	0	0	1	0	0	.176	.206
Jim Adduci	17	31	2	8	1	0	0	0	2	3	.258	.290
Robinson Chirinos	13	28	3	5	3	0	0	0	0	2	.179	.286
Joey Butler	8	12	3	4	2	0	0	1	0	3	.333	.500
Adam Rosales	17	11	4	2	0	0	1	4	0	3	.182	.455
Julio Borbón	1	1	1	0	0	0	0	0	0	0	.000	.000
Pitcher totals	163	18	1	0	0	0	0	0	0	2	.000	.000
Team totals	163	5585	730	1465	262	23	176	691	149	462	.262	.412

=== Pitching ===
Note: W = Wins; L = Losses; ERA = Earned run average; G = Games pitched; GS = Games started; SV = Saves; IP = Innings pitched; H = Hits allowed; R = Runs allowed; ER = Earned runs allowed; BB = Walks allowed; SO = Strikeouts

Player	W	L	ERA	G	GS	SV	IP	H	R	ER	BB	SO
Derek Holland	10	9	3.42	33	33	0	213.0	210	90	81	64	189
Yu Darvish	13	9	2.83	32	32	0	209.2	145	68	66	80	277
Martín Pérez	10	6	3.62	20	20	0	124.1	129	55	50	37	84
Alexi Ogando	7	4	3.11	23	18	0	104.1	87	38	36	41	72
Nick Tepesch	4	6	4.84	19	17	0	93.0	100	53	50	27	76
Justin Grimm	7	7	6.37	17	17	0	89.0	116	67	63	31	68
Matt Garza	4	5	4.38	13	13	0	84.1	89	47	41	22	74
Tanner Scheppers	6	2	1.88	76	0	1	76.2	58	21	16	24	59
Joe Nathan	6	2	1.39	67	0	43	64.2	36	10	10	22	73
Robbie Ross Jr.	4	2	3.03	65	0	0	62.1	63	21	21	19	58
Neal Cotts	8	3	1.11	58	0	1	57.0	36	8	7	18	65
Jason Frasor	4	3	2.57	61	0	0	49.0	36	15	14	20	48
Ross Wolf	1	3	4.15	22	3	0	47.2	58	24	22	15	21
Joe Ortiz	2	2	4.23	32	0	0	44.2	46	26	21	10	27
Josh Lindblom	1	3	5.46	8	5	0	31.1	35	19	19	11	21
Joakim Soria	1	0	3.80	26	0	0	23.2	18	10	10	14	28
Michael Kirkman	0	2	8.18	25	0	1	22.0	36	20	20	15	25
Travis Blackley	1	1	4.70	4	3	0	15.1	16	8	8	2	11
Derek Lowe	1	0	9.00	9	0	0	13.0	16	13	13	3	8
Cory Burns	1	0	3.18	10	0	0	11.1	12	4	4	7	5
Matt Harrison	0	2	8.44	2	2	0	10.2	14	11	10	7	12
Kyle McClellan	0	1	7.71	7	0	0	9.1	7	8	8	5	3
Neftalí Feliz	0	0	0.00	6	0	0	4.2	5	0	0	2	4
Wilmer Font	0	0	0.00	2	0	0	1.1	1	0	0	2	0
David Murphy	0	0	0.00	1	0	0	1.0	1	0	0	0	1
Team totals	91	72	3.62	163	163	46	1463.1	1370	636	589	498	1309

== Farm system ==
Level	Team	League	Manager
AAA	Round Rock Express	Pacific Coast League	Bobby Jones
AA	Frisco RoughRiders	Texas League	Steve Buechele
A	Myrtle Beach Pelicans	Carolina League	Jason Wood
A	Hickory Crawdads	South Atlantic League	Corey Ragsdale
A-Short Season	Spokane Indians	Northwest League	Tim Hulett
Rookie	AZL Rangers	Arizona League	Kenny Holmberg
