= 2013 American League Wild Card tie-breaker game =

2013 Major League Baseball tie-breaker game

	1	2	3	4	5	6	7	8	9	R	H	E
Tampa Bay Rays	1	0	2	0	0	1	0	0	1	5	7	0
Texas Rangers	0	0	1	0	0	1	0	0	0	2	7	1
- Date: September 30, 2013
- Venue: Rangers Ballpark in Arlington
- City: Arlington, Texas
- Managers: Joe Maddon (Tampa Bay Rays); Ron Washington (Texas Rangers)
- Umpires: Tim Welke (crew chief), Jeff Kellogg, Bruce Dreckman, Chris Guccione, Tom Hallion, Ron Kulpa
- Attendance: 42,796
- Television: TBS
- TV announcers: Brian Anderson, John Smoltz and Joe Simpson
- Radio: ESPN
- Radio announcers: Jon Sciambi and Chris Singleton

The 2013 American League Wild Card tie-breaker game was a one-game extension to Major League Baseball's (MLB) 2013 regular season, played between the Texas Rangers and Tampa Bay Rays to determine the second participant in the 2013 American League (AL) Wild Card Game. It was played at the Globe Life Park in Arlington on September 30, 2013. The Rays defeated the Rangers, 5–2, and advanced to the AL Wild Card Game against the Cleveland Indians at Progressive Field, which they won 4–0; the Rangers failed to qualify for the postseason.

The tie-breaker game was necessary after both teams finished the season with win–loss records of 91–71 and thus tied for the second Wild Card position in the AL. The Rangers were awarded home field for the game, as they won the regular season series against the Rays, 4–3. The game was televised on TBS. It was the fourth tie-breaker in MLB history for a Wild Card spot, although it was the first when MLB used the format of two Wild Card teams playing in a Wild Card Game from 2012 to 2021. The tie-breaker counted as the 163rd regular season game for both teams, with all events in the game added to regular season statistics.

== Background ==
In Major League Baseball from 2012 to 2021, the two teams with the best record in each league who do not win a division played in the Wild Card Game. A number of teams were in competition for these Wild Card spots, along with their divisional competition. The Rangers spent over 80 days leading the American League West and shared the lead as late as September 4. The Rays spent only a few days leading the American League East, but held a share of the lead as late as August 24. The Cleveland Indians did not lead the American League Central after July 2 but remained close throughout the season and ultimately finished just a single game back of the Central champion Detroit Tigers.

Although other teams including the Kansas City Royals, Baltimore Orioles, and New York Yankees had vied for a Wild Card spot, the Indians, Rangers, and Rays all remained in contention until the end of the season. Entering the final day of the scheduled regular season, on which all three teams played, the Indians had a 91–70 record while both the Rangers and Rays had 90–71 records. These were the best non-division-leading records in the American League. Thus, the possibility existed (had the Indians lost and the Rays and Rangers won) for a three-way tie for the two Wild Card spots, which would have required several tie-breaker games to settle. However, all three teams won, leaving the Indians definitively in the Wild Card Game at 92–70 and the Rays and Rangers tied at 91–71 for the second spot.

The Indians finished the season strong, winning their last 10 games to clinch their wild card berth. The Rays were 16–12 in September, winning 8 of their last 10. The Rangers were just 12–15 in September, although they also won eight of their final 10 games. The Rangers was awarded home-field advantage for the tie-breaker game, as they had won the season series against the Rays 4–3.

== Game summary ==
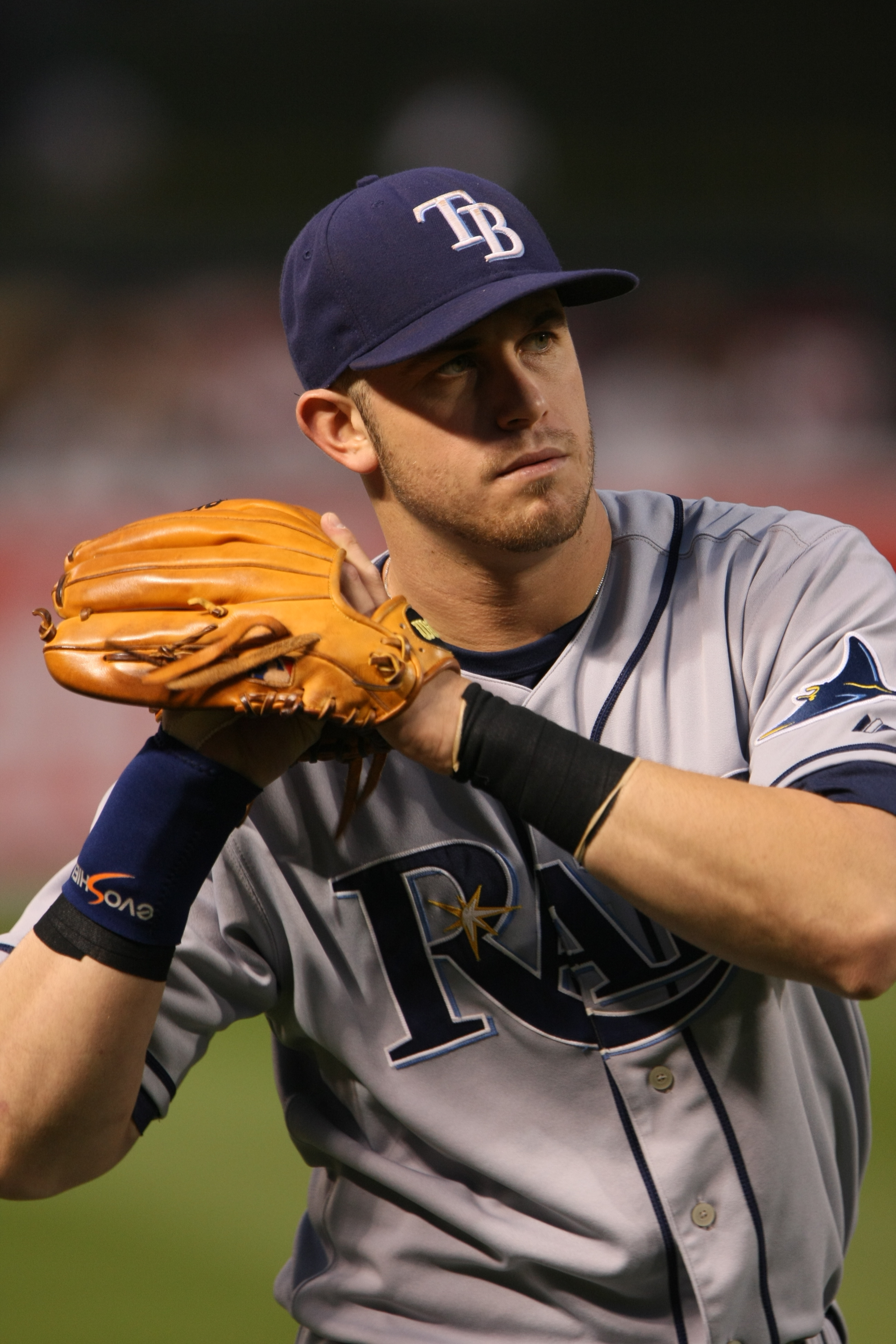
Evan Longoria (pictured here in 2008) hit a two-run home run in the third inning

Monday, September 30, 2013 7:08 pm (CDT) at Rangers Ballpark in Arlington, Texas 82 °F (28 °C), Mostly Clear
Team	1	2	3	4	5	6	7	8	9	R	H	E
Tampa Bay	1	0	2	0	0	1	0	0	1	5	7	0
Texas	0	0	1	0	0	1	0	0	0	2	7	1
WP: David Price (10–8) LP: Martín Pérez (10–6); Home runs: TB: Evan Longoria (32); TEX: None; Attendance: 42,796

Desmond Jennings opened the first inning with a single, but was thrown out at second base trying to stretch the hit into a double. Wil Myers then walked, advanced to third base on singles by Ben Zobrist and Evan Longoria, and finally scored on a sacrifice fly by Delmon Young. Rays starter David Price struck out leadoff batter Ian Kinsler, then allowed a walk to Elvis Andrus but picked him off and finished the inning by retiring Alex Ríos. The score remained 1–0 until the top of the third inning, when Jennings drew a walk and scored on a home run by Longoria to give the Rays a 3–0 lead. The Rangers struck right back in the bottom half, as Craig Gentry led off the inning with a single. After advancing to second on a Leonys Martín groundout, he scored on a single to right field by Kinsler. The Rays scored again in the sixth, as Longoria doubled to lead off the inning, and advanced to third base on a groundout by Young. The next batter, David DeJesus, hit a double to right field that scored Longoria and put the Rays ahead, 4–1. Rangers reliever Alexi Ogando entered the game with one out and recorded the final two outs to end the inning.

After a single and a stolen base from Andrus, Ríos doubled in the bottom half of the sixth to cut the score to 4–2. A small controversy arose in the top of the seventh inning. Longoria and Myers were on first and second base respectively with two outs when Young hit a line drive to center field. Replays showed that the ball bounced into Leonys Martín's (the Rangers' center fielder) glove after hitting the ground, making it a trap and therefore should have been a hit. However, the umpires ruled the play an out, ending the inning without a run scoring. Ultimately, the issue did not affect the outcome. The Rays added onto their lead in the ninth inning when Sam Fuld stole third and a scored on a throwing error from Rangers reliever Tanner Scheppers, extending their lead to 5–2. Price closed the game in the ninth, recording three straight outs and finishing off a complete game.

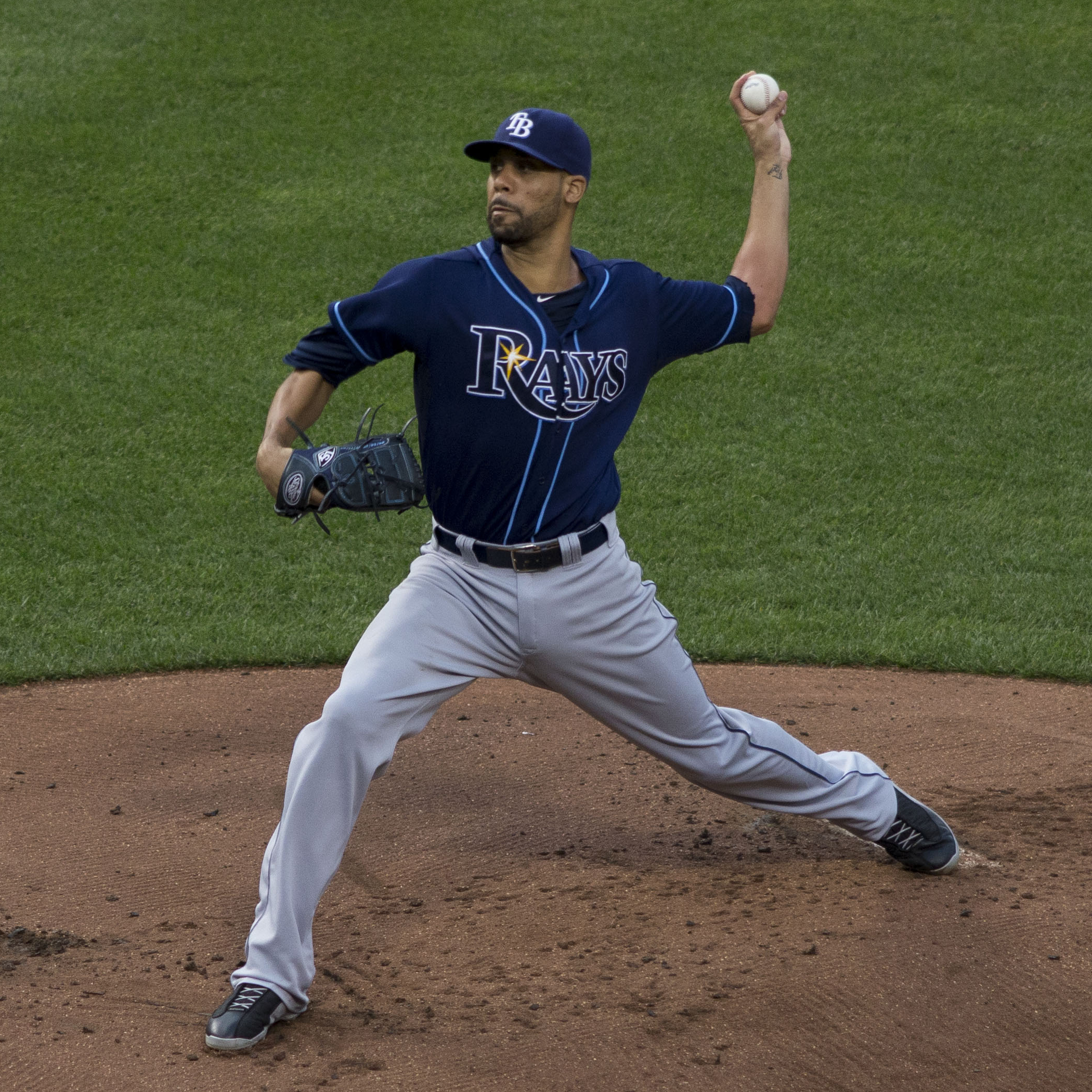
David Price threw a complete game, the first in a tie-breaker since 1999.

== Aftermath ==
The Rays' win clinched the team's fourth post-season berth in franchise history. The Rays advanced to the AL Wild Card Game, in which they defeated the Cleveland Indians. They would then lose the ALDS to the eventual World Series champion Boston Red Sox, 3 games to 1.

The game counted as a regular season game in baseball statistics. For example, Evan Longoria's third-inning home run broke Stan Musial's record for the most home runs in the last game of the season, setting the mark at seven. He went 3-for-4 with a double, a home run, and two RBI in the game overall. This left him 11-for-19 with seven home runs and ten RBIs in season finales from 2009 to 2013.
