= Engel Beltré =

Dominican baseball player (born 1989)

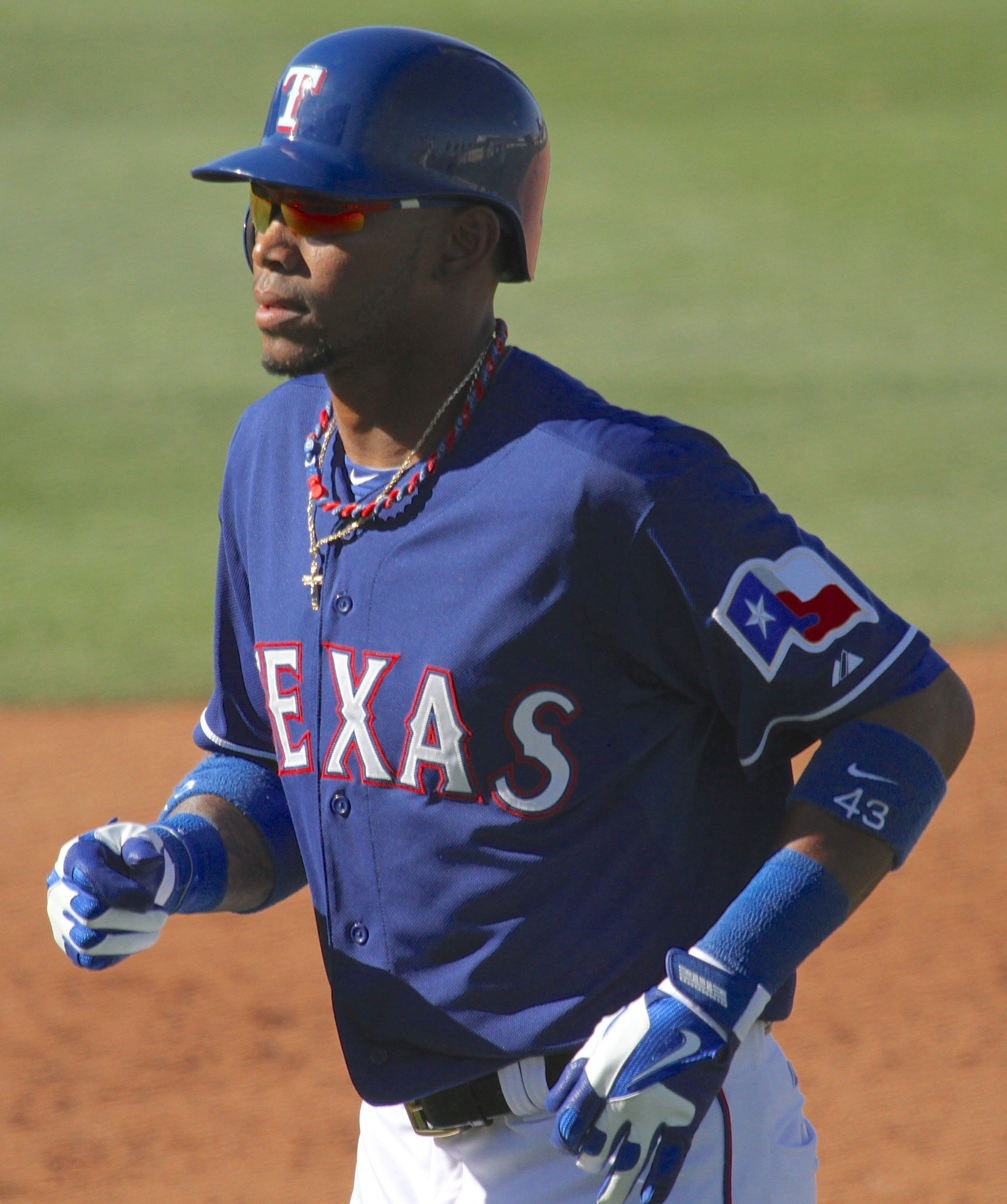
- Beltré with the Texas Rangers in 2014 spring training
- Outfielder
- Born: November 1, 1989 (age 36); Santo Domingo, Dominican Republic
- Batted: Left Threw: Left

MLB debut
- June 26, 2013, for the Texas Rangers

Last MLB appearance
- September 23, 2013, for the Texas Rangers

MLB statistics
- Batting average: .250
- Home runs: 0
- Runs batted in: 2
- Stats at Baseball Reference

Teams
- Texas Rangers (2013)
Medals
Men's baseball
Representing Spain
European Championship
Gold medal – first place	2023 Czechia	Team

Engel Manuel Beltré (born November 1, 1989) is a Dominican former professional baseball outfielder. He has previously played in Major League Baseball (MLB) for the Texas Rangers. Born in the Dominican Republic, he plays for the Spain national baseball team in international competition.

== Career ==
Beltré briefly lived in New York City, attending DeWitt Clinton High School in 2003. As a child, he was a devoted Yankees fan.

=== Boston Red Sox ===
Beltré was signed by the Boston Red Sox as an international free agent out of the Dominican Republic in 2006 for $575k or $600k.

=== Texas Rangers ===
On July 31, 2007, Beltré, Kason Gabbard, and David Murphy were traded from the Red Sox to the Texas Rangers for Éric Gagné. While playing for the Double-A Frisco RoughRiders in 2011, Beltré was suspended 15 games following an altercation that saw him throw a trash can at fans in the stands.

Beltré started the 2013 season with the Triple-A Round Rock Express. He was recalled by the Rangers on June 23, 2013, when Craig Gentry was added to the disabled list. He made his MLB debut on June 26 against the New York Yankees as a pinch runner in the ninth inning and was caught stealing second base. He got his first two major league hits the next day against Phil Hughes. Beltré was optioned back to Round Rock on August 2, and recalled on August 5. In 22 total games during his rookie campaign, he batted .250/.268/.275 with no home runs, two RBI, and one stolen base.

Beltré only made 13 appearances in the minor leagues during the 2014 season as the result of an injury. On October 6, 2014, Beltré was removed from the 40–man roster and sent outright to Triple–A Round Rock. He elected free agency on November 4.

=== Chicago White Sox ===
On January 22, 2015, Beltré signed a minor league contract with the Chicago White Sox. In 21 games for the Triple-A Charlotte Knights, he slashed .234/.268/.312 with one home run, seven RBI, and two stolen bases. Beltré was released by the White Sox organization on May 12.

=== San Francisco Giants ===
On May 27, 2015, Beltré signed a minor league contract with the San Francisco Giants organization. In 86 games for the Double-A Richmond Flying Squirrels, he batted .251/.277/.348 with five home runs, 26 RBI, and four stolen bases. Beltré elected free agency following the season on November 6.

=== Piratas de Campeche ===
On May 3, 2016, Beltré signed with the Piratas de Campeche of the Mexican League. In 75 games for Campeche, he batted .339/.382/.470 with five home runs, 33 RBI, and six stolen bases. In 2017, Beltré appeared in 72 for the team, hitting .268/.329/.373 with six home runs, 28 RBI, and 10 stolen bases. He was released by the Piratas on June 30.

=== Saraperos de Saltillo ===
On April 15, 2018, Beltré signed with the Saraperos de Saltillo of the Mexican League. In 15 games for Saltillo, he slashed .274/.357/.307 with no home runs, six RBI, and five stolen bases. Beltré was released by the Saraperos on May 4.

=== Nettuno Baseball Club ===
On June 29, 2021, Beltré signed with the Nettuno Baseball Club of the Italian Baseball League (IBL). In 8 games, Beltré batted .313/.421/.406 with 6 RBI and 1 stolen base.

=== Charleston Dirty Birds ===
On April 12, 2022, Beltré signed with the Charleston Dirty Birds of the Atlantic League of Professional Baseball. In 84 games for the Dirty Birds, he batted .293/.340/.428 with 8 home runs, 45 RBI, and 11 stolen bases. Beltré was released by Charleston on August 8.

=== Piratas de Campeche (second stint) ===
On February 5, 2024, Beltré signed with the Piratas de Campeche. In 19 games for the Piratas, he batted .183/.269/.267 with no home runs, four RBI, and two stolen bases. Beltré was released by Campeche on May 5.

== International career ==
=== Team Spain ===
Beltré played in the 2013 World Baseball Classic with the Spain national baseball team.

He also played for Team Spain in the 2019 European Baseball Championship and in the 2021 European Baseball Championship. He also played for the team at the Africa/Europe 2020 Olympic Qualification tournament, in Italy in September 2019, and was suspended for three games for his part in a brawl on September 21.

Beltré was selected to represent Spain at the 2023 World Baseball Classic qualification.

=== Winter Leagues ===
During the 2018-21 winter seasons, Beltre played for three different teams in the Dominican Winter League (LIDOM)

During the 2021-22 winter season, he played in Puerto Rico for the Criollos de Caguas in the Liga de Béisbol Profesional Roberto Clemente.
