= Ross Wolf =

American baseball player (born 1982)

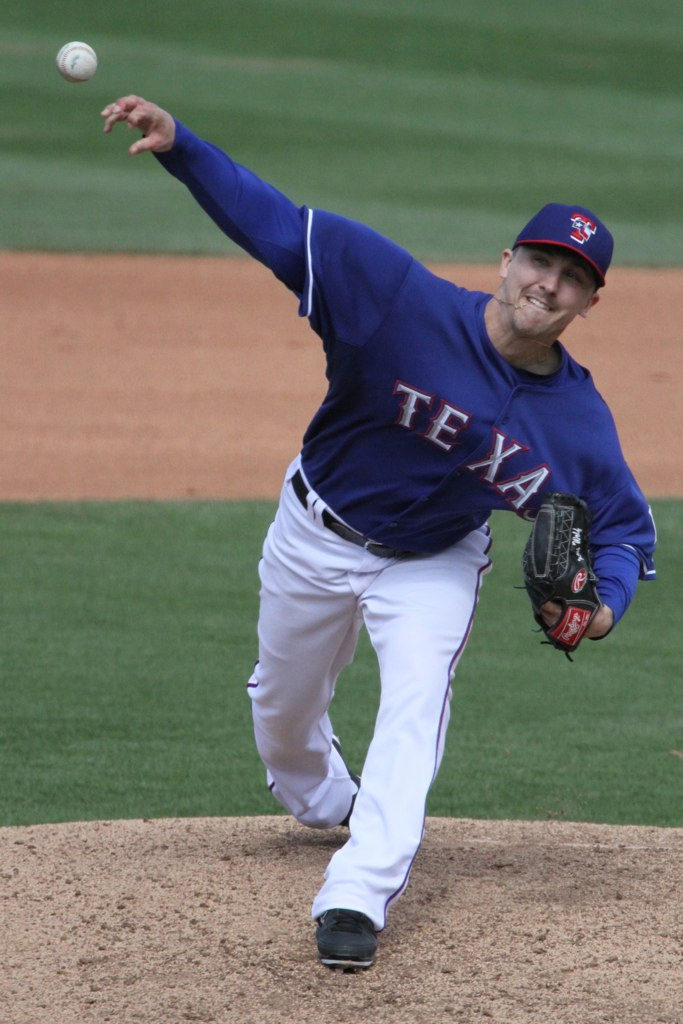
- Wolf with the Texas Rangers in 2013
- Pitcher
- Born: October 18, 1982 (age 43); Effingham, Illinois, U.S.
- Batted: Right Threw: Right

Professional debut
- MLB: August 10, 2007, for the Florida Marlins
- KBO: March 30, 2014, for the SK Wyverns

Last appearance
- MLB: September 13, 2013, for the Texas Rangers
- KBO: August 15, 2014, for the SK Wyverns

MLB statistics
- Win–loss record: 1–4
- Earned run average: 5.45
- Strikeouts: 36

KBO statistics
- Win–loss record: 2–2
- Earned run average: 4.85
- Strikeouts: 41
- Stats at Baseball Reference

Teams
- Florida Marlins (2007); Oakland Athletics (2010); Texas Rangers (2013); SK Wyverns (2014)

Ross Garrett Wolf (born October 18, 1982) is an American former professional baseball relief pitcher. He played in Major League Baseball (MLB) for the Florida Marlins, Oakland Athletics, and Texas Rangers, and in the KBO League for the SK Wyverns. He bats and throws right-handed.

Wolf attended Newton Community High School in Newton, Illinois and Wabash Valley College in Mount Carmel, Illinois.

== Professional career ==
Wolf was selected by the Montreal Expos in the 47th round (1390th overall) in the 2001 Major League Baseball draft. However, he refused to sign with them and remained a free agent. He was selected the following year by the Florida Marlins in the 18th round (533rd overall) in the 2002 Major League Baseball draft, this time accepting the position. After the 2013 season, he moved to Korea Baseball Championship. SK Wyverns is his new team.

=== Florida Marlins ===
Wolf was assigned to Short-Season Jamestown, where in 11 starts, he went 2-4 with a 4.66 ERA, striking out 18 in 46.1 innings. Wolf played 2003 with Single-A Greensboro, where in 27 games, he went 6-1 with a 1.61 ERA, striking out 26 in 50.1 innings. Wolf played 2004 with High-A Jupiter, where in 43 games, he went 11-7 with a 2.60 ERA and 5 saves, striking out 58 in 90 innings, tying for 4th in wins despite not starting a single game. Wolf played 2005 with Double-A Carolina, where in 54 games, he went 5-4 with a 4.96 ERA, striking out 59 in 78 innings. Wolf began 2006 with Carolina, where he pitched in 12 games before earning a promotion to Triple-A Albuquerque in May. He pitched in 48 games with the Isotopes to finish the season. In 60 games in 2006, he went 5-3 with a 4.05 ERA, striking out 41 in 66.2 innings.

Wolf opened 2007 with Albuquerque, where he had a 2.82 ERA in 41 games before earning a promotion to Florida. On August 9, Wolf had his contract purchased. He made his major league debut on August 10 against the Mets, pitching 0.1 scoreless innings. On August 25, Wolf was optioned back to Albuquerque, but he didn't stay for long, returning on September 4 after the rosters expanded. He got his first major league strikeout on September 5, against Wily Mo Peña of the Nationals. In 14 games with the Marlins in 2007, he went 0-1 with an 11.68 ERA, striking out 6 in 12.1 innings.

After beginning 2008 on the disabled list, he made 3 rehab appearances with Jupiter starting on May 19, and was assigned to Albuquerque at their conclusion. On May 31, he was outrighted off the major league roster. In 41 games in 2008, he went 5-2 with a 3.77 ERA, striking out 27 in 43 innings. After the season, he became a minor league free agent.

=== Baltimore Orioles ===
On December 1, 2008, Wolf signed a minor league deal with the Baltimore Orioles. Wolf played all of 2009 with Triple-A Norfolk, where in 47 games, he went 4-2 with a 3.95 ERA, striking out a career-high 73 in 82 innings.

He signed another minor league deal with Baltimore for the 2010 season. He began 2010 with Norfolk, going 0-2 with a 1.88 ERA, striking out 26 in 38 1/3 innings before being traded

=== Oakland Athletics ===
On June 22, 2010, Wolf was traded to the Oakland Athletics for Jake Fox. He was assigned to the Triple-A Sacramento River Cats, where he pitched in seven games before earning a promotion. On July 7, he was called up by Oakland, replacing Tyson Ross. He made his Athletics debut on July 10 against the Angels. After not pitching since July 29, he was optioned to Sacramento on August 22 when closer Andrew Bailey was reinstated from the disabled list. When the rosters expanded on September 1, Wolf was recalled. In 11 games with Oakland, he had a 4.26 ERA, striking out nine in 12 2/3 innings. On October 7, Wolf was outrighted off the roster, and he elected free agency two days later.

=== Houston Astros ===
On November 9, 2010, Wolf signed a minor league contract with the Houston Astros organization. Wolf played 2011 with the Triple-A Oklahoma City RedHawks, where in 56 games, he went 4-3 with a 4.76 ERA, striking out 55 in 73 2/3 innings. After the season, he became a minor league free agent.

=== Baltimore Orioles (second stint) ===
On January 9, 2012, Wolf signed a minor league contract with the Baltimore Orioles. He played in seven games for the Double-A Bowie Baysox, recording a 6.75 ERA with seven strikeouts and one save over eight innings of work. Wolf was released by the Orioles organization on April 22.

=== Texas Rangers ===
On April 27, 2012, Wolf signed a minor league contract with Texas Rangers, and was assigned to the Double-A Frisco RoughRiders. After 15 appearances, he was promoted to the Triple-A Round Rock Express on June 12. He bounced between them during June and July before settling with Frisco on July 14. In 50 games in 2012, he went 3-1 with a 3.18 ERA, striking out 58 in 62 1/3 innings.

After signing with the Rangers for 2013, he was assigned to Frisco, making one appearance before being promoted to Round Rock to join their rotation, his first time starting since his professional debut in 2002, excluding one start in 2005. After 6 starts with Round Rock, he was promoted to the Rangers.

After scheduled starting pitcher Nick Tepesch had a blister form on his pitching hand, Wolf got the chance to make a start with the Rangers. On May 22, Wolf was called up to start against the Oakland Athletics, where he gave up one run in five innings, earning his first career win. Instead of being optioned back to Round Rock, he stayed with Texas in the bullpen. On June 8, 2013, Wolf pitched 6 2/3 innings of relief in an 18-inning showdown between the Texas Rangers and the Toronto Blue Jays, in which he gave up one unearned run in the bottom of the 18th inning. He became the fourth pitcher in 50 years to throw at least 6 2/3 innings with no earned runs and get stuck with a loss. The most recent was current Rangers broadcaster Steve Busby who, ironically, lost to the Rangers in his game. Wolf made more two starts in July, but was otherwise utilized in the bullpen. From August to the end of the season, he only appeared in five games. In 22 games with the Rangers in 2013, Wolf posted a 1-3 record with a 4.15 ERA and one hold, striking out 21 in 47 2/3 innings. On November 4, Wolf was removed from the 40-man roster and sent outright to Triple-A Round Rock; he quickly re-signed with Texas on a minor league contract with that included an invitation to spring training.

=== SK Wyverns ===
On December 13, 2013, Wolf exercised an opt-out clause in his contract to pitch with the SK Wyverns of the KBO League. Wolf made 23 appearances (13 starts) for the Wyverns during the 2014 season, compiling a 2-2 record and 4.85 ERA with 41 strikeouts and four saves across 85 1/3 innings pitched.

=== Texas Rangers (second stint) ===
After leaving the SK Wyverns, Wolf signed a minor league contract with the Texas Rangers on December 11, 2014. He made 26 appearances (14 starts) for the Triple-A Round Rock Express in 2015, compiling an 11-7 record and 5.35 ERA with 44 strikeouts over 106 innings of work.

Announced his retirement from professional baseball on February 21, 2016.
