= Jake Fox =

American baseball player (born 1982)

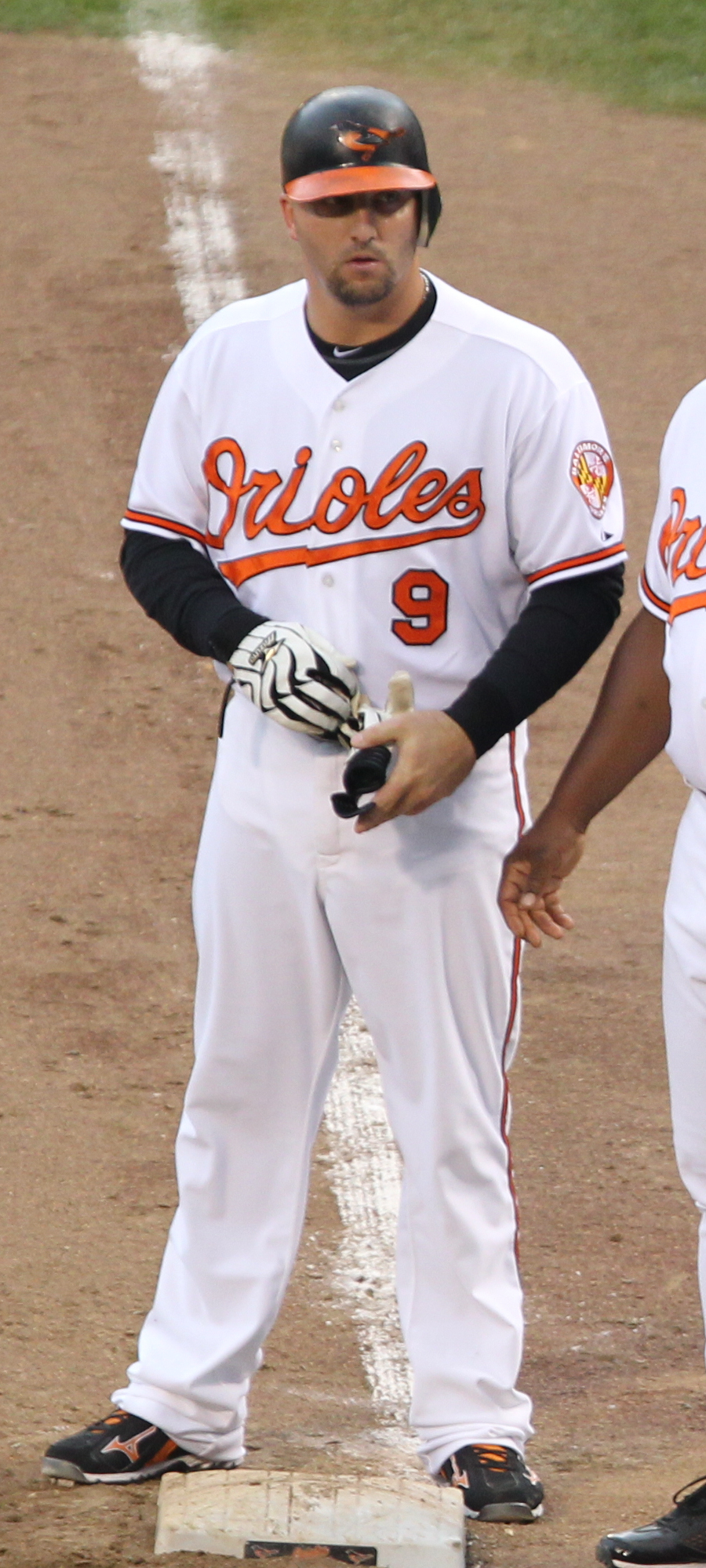
- Fox with the Baltimore Orioles in 2011
- Utility player
- Born: July 20, 1982 (age 43); Beech Grove, Indiana, U.S.
- Batted: Right Threw: Right

Professional debut
- MLB: July 19, 2007, for the Chicago Cubs
- KBO: May 20, 2015, for the Hanwha Eagles

Last appearance
- MLB: September 25, 2011, for the Baltimore Orioles
- KBO: October 3, 2015, for the Hanwha Eagles

MLB statistics
- Batting average: .237
- Home runs: 20
- Runs batted in: 73

KBO statistics
- Batting average: .278
- Home runs: 7
- Runs batted in: 25
- Stats at Baseball Reference

Teams
- Chicago Cubs (2007, 2009); Oakland Athletics (2010); Baltimore Orioles (2010–2011); Hanwha Eagles (2015)

Jacob Quirin Fox (born July 20, 1982) is an American former professional baseball utility player. He played in Major League Baseball (MLB) for the Chicago Cubs, Oakland Athletics and Baltimore Orioles, and in the KBO League for the Hanwha Eagles.

== Early years ==
Fox is a graduate of Cathedral High School and went on to attend the University of Michigan where he earned first-team all-Big Ten conference honors. In 2002, he played collegiate summer baseball in the Cape Cod Baseball League for the Yarmouth-Dennis Red Sox.

== Professional career ==
=== Chicago Cubs ===
Fox was drafted as a catcher by the Chicago Cubs in the third round (73rd overall) of the 2003 Major League Baseball draft.

From 2003 to 2006, he spent parts of each season in Single-A ball for the Lansing Lugnuts and the Daytona Cubs, before moving on to Double-A in mid-2006. As a member of the Lugnuts, Fox was given the opportunity to catch for then-Cubs pitcher Mark Prior, who was on a rehab assignment. He was ecstatic to catch for Prior, and even invited his family members to attend the game. However, upon arriving at the club house, he found out that Paul Bako was actually slated to catch the game. Fox approached his manager, Julio Garcia, who claimed that Fox was not experienced enough to catch a Major League pitcher like Prior. Garcia then revealed that the team was playing a practical joke on Fox, and that he would actually be in the team's lineup.

On July 19, 2007, Fox was called up from Double-A Tennessee to the major leagues after shortstop César Izturis was traded to the Pittsburgh Pirates. Fox was called up with the intent that he would play first base, outfield, and be the third catcher. He made his major league debut on July 19, 2007, against the San Francisco Giants in a pinch hitting role and grounded into a double play. He had his first career hit on August 15 against Phil Dumatrait of the Cincinnati Reds, a double. Fox hit his first career home run on June 25, 2009, against Armando Galarraga of the Detroit Tigers. On August 29, 2009, Fox hit his first career grand slam against Bobby Parnell of the New York Mets.

In Triple-A with the Iowa Cubs in 2009, Fox had a breakout year. He was batting .423 and had hit 17 home runs and 50 RBIs by June 1, 2009, and was leading the PCL in both of these categories along with RBI, slugging percentage, and OPS. He was recalled to the Cubs on May 27, 2009. Fox was optioned back to Triple-A Iowa on June 10, 2009, and was recalled to the Chicago Cubs again on June 16. He achieved success as a part-time utility player, capable of filling in at corner outfield and infield positions, as well as catcher.

=== Oakland Athletics ===
On December 3, 2009, the Oakland Athletics acquired Fox along with Aaron Miles, from the Chicago Cubs for Jeff Gray, Matt Spencer and Ronny Morla.

=== Baltimore Orioles ===
On June 22, 2010, Fox was traded to the Baltimore Orioles for Ross Wolf and cash considerations. In Spring Training in 2011, he led the major leagues in home runs, with 10, and extra base hits, with 17. He was designated for assignment on June 1, and elected free agency on November 2.

=== Pittsburgh Pirates ===
The Pittsburgh Pirates signed Fox to a minor league contract in November 2011, and released him in June 2012.

=== Somerset Patriots ===
On July 13, 2012, Fox signed with the Somerset Patriots of the Atlantic League of Professional Baseball. In 21 games he hit a fantastic .388/.433/.750 with 7 home runs and 20 RBIs.

=== Philadelphia Phillies ===
On August 5, 2012, the Philadelphia Phillies signed Fox to a minor league contract.

=== Somerset Patriots (second stint) ===
On March 6, 2013, Fox signed with the Somerset Patriots of the Atlantic League of Professional Baseball. He hit .310/.387/.572 with 25 home runs in 374 at bats.

=== Arizona Diamondbacks ===
On August 11, 2013, the Arizona Diamondbacks signed Fox to a minor league deal.

=== Vaqueros Laguna ===
Fox spent the 2013–14 Mexican Pacific League season with the Cañeros de Los Mochis, before signing with the Mexican League's Vaqueros Laguna on February 7, 2014. In 57 games he hit .307/.397/.605 with 16 home runs and 46 RBIs.

=== Philadelphia Phillies (second stint) ===
On June 12, 2014, Fox was traded to the Philadelphia Phillies.

=== Toronto Blue Jays ===
Fox signed a minor league contract with the Toronto Blue Jays on December 12, 2014, that included an invitation to spring training.

=== Hanwha Eagles ===
He played 29 games for the Double-A New Hampshire Fisher Cats before being released in order to sign a 1-year, $120,000 contract with the Hanwha Eagles of the Korea Baseball Organization.

=== Philadelphia Phillies (third stint) ===
On January 8, 2016, the Philadelphia Phillies signed Fox to a minor league contract. He played in 123 games for the Double–A Reading Fightin Phils, hitting .264/.329/.494 with 23 home runs and 71 RBI. Fox elected free agency following the season on November 7.

On July 29, 2017, Fox signed a minor league deal with the Philadelphia Phillies. He did not appear for the organization and elected free agency following the season on November 6.

=== Coaching career ===
Fox was named as the hitting coach of the Augusta GreenJackets for the 2019 season.

== Post-baseball ==
After a career in Minor and Major League Baseball, Fox entered the business world with his own brand The Fox Code, a lifestyle and clothing line inspired by the lessons he learned from the sport.

== Awards ==
- Florida State League Player of the Week (5/7/06)
- Florida State League Mid-Season All-Star (2006)
- Topps Florida State League Player of the Month (June 2006)
- Baseball America High Class A All-Star (2006)
- Southern League Player of the Week (5/21/07)
- Southern League Mid-Season All-Star (2007)
- Southern League Player of the Week (6/23/2008)
- Southern League Post-Season All-Star (2008)
- Pacific Coast League Player of the Week (4/20/2009)
- Pacific Coast League Player of the Week (5/18/2009)
- Atlantic League Player of the Year (2013)
- Baseball America's Independent League All-Star Team-1st Team (2013)
