= David Murphy (baseball) =

American baseball player (born 1981)

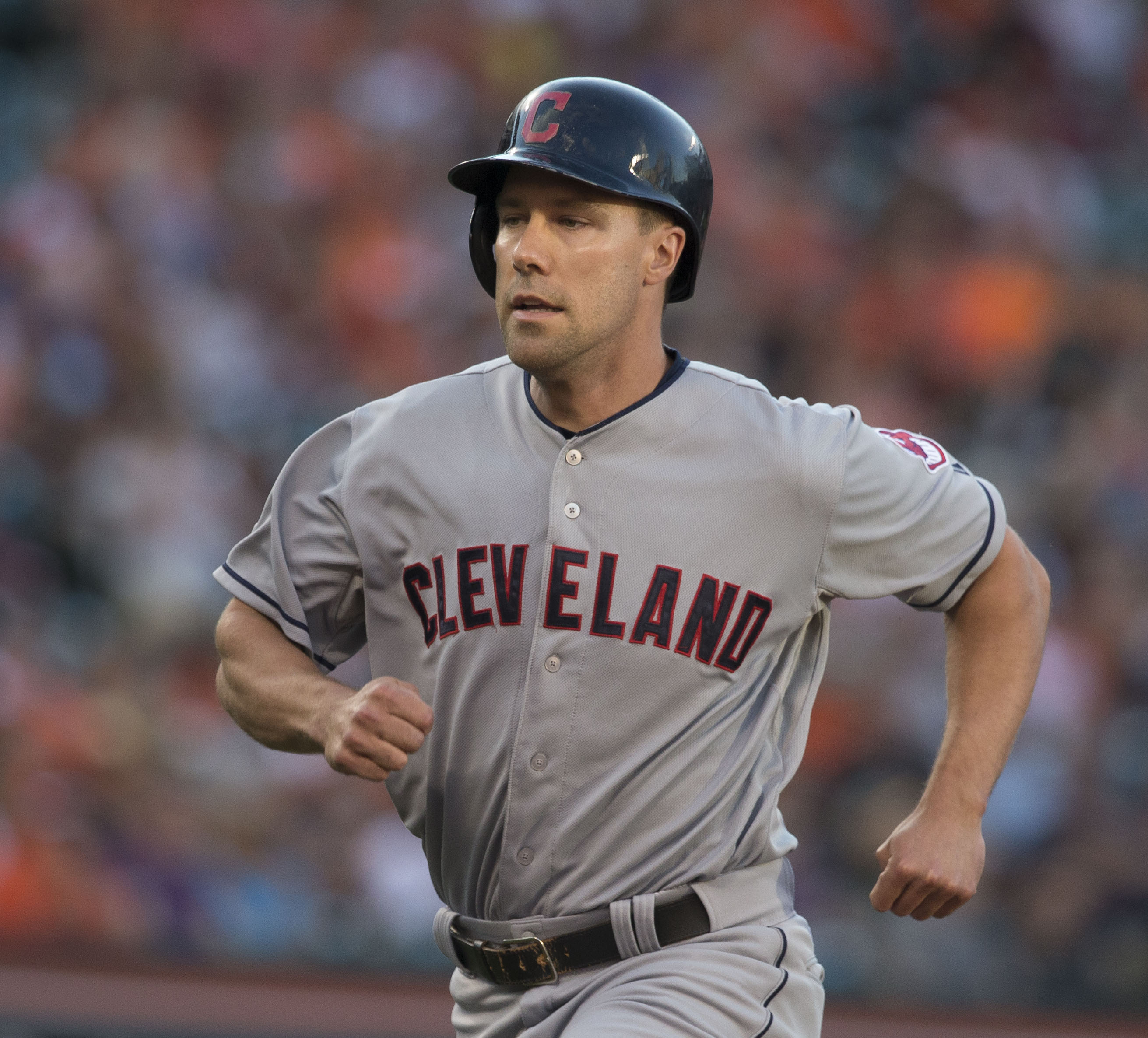
- Murphy with the Cleveland Indians
- Outfielder
- Born: October 18, 1981 (age 45); Houston, Texas, U.S.
- Batted: Left Threw: Left

MLB debut
- September 2, 2006, for the Boston Red Sox

Last MLB appearance
- October 3, 2015, for the Los Angeles Angels of Anaheim

MLB statistics
- Batting average: .274
- Home runs: 104
- Runs batted in: 472
- Stats at Baseball Reference

Teams
- Boston Red Sox (2006–2007); Texas Rangers (2007–2013); Cleveland Indians (2014–2015); Los Angeles Angels of Anaheim (2015)

David Matthew Murphy (born October 18, 1981) is an American former professional baseball outfielder. He played in Major League Baseball (MLB) for the Boston Red Sox, Texas Rangers, Cleveland Indians and Los Angeles Angels of Anaheim.

Murphy was drafted in the 2003 MLB draft by the Red Sox. He made his MLB debut with the Red Sox, and was traded to the Rangers in 2007. He signed with the Indians as a free agent before the 2014 season, and was traded to the Angels during the 2015 season. Also drafted 1439th in the 2000 MLB draft but did not sign.

== Amateur career ==
Born in Houston, Texas and raised in Spring, Texas, Murphy played high school baseball with fellow MLB players Chris George and Josh Barfield at Klein High School. At Klein, Murphy led the team to a state title in 1998 as a pitcher and outfielder, earned All-State honors, and was also a USA Today High School All-America Honorable Mention. As a senior, Murphy hit .500 with 12 home runs and 46 RBIs and was also a member of the National Honor Society. Murphy went on to Baylor University, turning down offers from the University of Texas, Rice University, and Texas A&M University. As a freshman, Murphy was the starting right fielder for the Bears, and hit .271 with five home runs. As a sophomore, Murphy hit .318 with six home runs, and hit .413 with 11 home runs in his junior and final season at Baylor. In 2001 and 2002, Murphy played collegiate summer baseball for the Wareham Gatemen of the Cape Cod Baseball League, and was named a league all-star in 2002.

== Professional career ==
=== Minor leagues ===
Murphy played for the Single-A Lowell Spinners, Single-A Sarasota Red Sox, rookie-level Gulf Coast Red Sox, Double-A Portland Sea Dogs, AFL Peoria Saguaros, and Triple-A Pawtucket Red Sox in the Red Sox organization.

In 2006 Murphy played 42 games for the Sea Dogs before being promoted to Pawtucket on May 26. While at Portland, Murphy had 47 hits in 172 at-bats (.273 batting average), with 17 doubles, 1 triple, 3 home runs, 25 RBI, and 11 walks. Murphy appeared in 84 games, going 85-for-318 (.267), with 23 doubles, 5 triples, 8 home runs, 44 RBI, and 45 walks.

=== Boston Red Sox (2006-2007) ===
==== 2006 ====
Murphy made his MLB debut on September 2, 2006. He hit a 1–2 pitch into center field at Fenway Park in his first major league at-bat for his first major league hit (a single) on September 2, 2006. He hit his first MLB home run against New York Yankees pitcher, Jaret Wright, on September 17, 2006, at Yankee Stadium. In 2006, he appeared in 20 games for the Boston Red Sox batting .227 with a home run and 2 RBI.

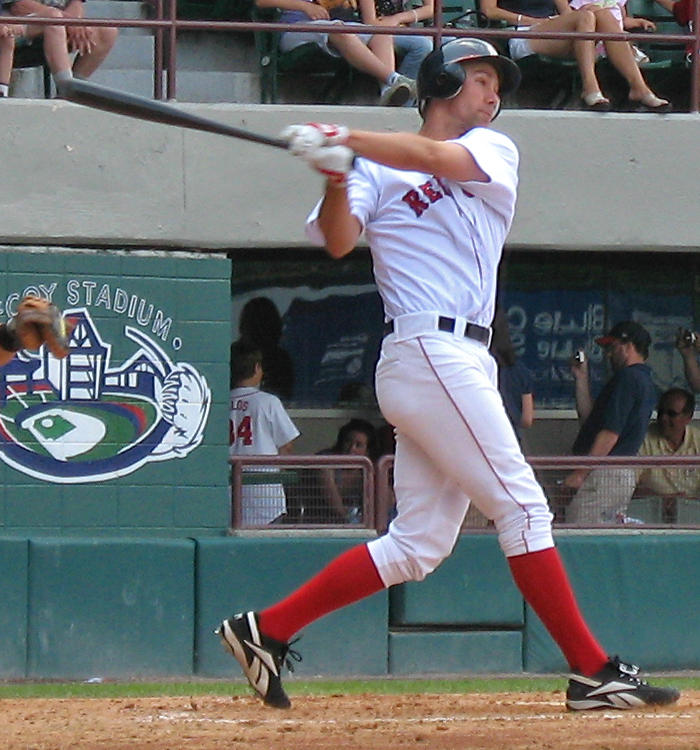
Murphy batting for the Pawtucket Red Sox, triple-A affiliates of the Boston Red Sox, in 2007

==== 2007 ====
Murphy began the 2007 season in the minor leagues. During his time in the major leagues with the Red Sox, he played 3 games with a triple in 2 plate appearances (.500 average).

=== Texas Rangers (2007–2013) ===
==== 2007 ====
On July 31, 2007, Murphy was traded to the Texas Rangers in a package that sent relief pitcher Éric Gagné to Boston. For the rest of the 2007 season, Murphy played 43 games with the Rangers batting .340 with 2 home runs and 14 RBI. Overall in 2007 combined with two teams, Murphy played 46 total games batting .343 with 2 home runs and 14 RBI.

==== 2008 ====
On April 25, 2008, the Rangers beat the Minnesota Twins 6–5 on Murphy's walk-off RBI single in the bottom of the 10th. It was Murphy's first career walk-off hit. On August 1, 2008, Murphy capped a 3-run rally in the bottom of the 9th, hitting a walk-off 2-RBI single off B. J. Ryan as the Rangers beat the Toronto Blue Jays 9–8. In 2009 Murphy hit a walk-off single against Houston Astros closer, José Valverde. On August 7, 2008, Murphy was placed on the 15-day DL after suffering a knee injury in a collision at home plate with Iván Rodríguez of the New York Yankees. Murphy did not play another game in the 2008 season, when swelling to his knee cut his attempts at rehab short. For the 2008 season, Murphy played in 108 games batting .275 with 15 home runs and 74 RBI.

==== 2009 ====
In 2009, Murphy played in 128 games batting .269 with 17 home runs and 57 RBI.

==== 2010 ====
In 2010, Murphy played in 138 games batting .291 with 12 home runs and 65 RBI. His efforts led to the Rangers entering the World Series for the first time in franchise history but the team would eventually lose the series to the San Francisco Giants.

==== 2011 ====
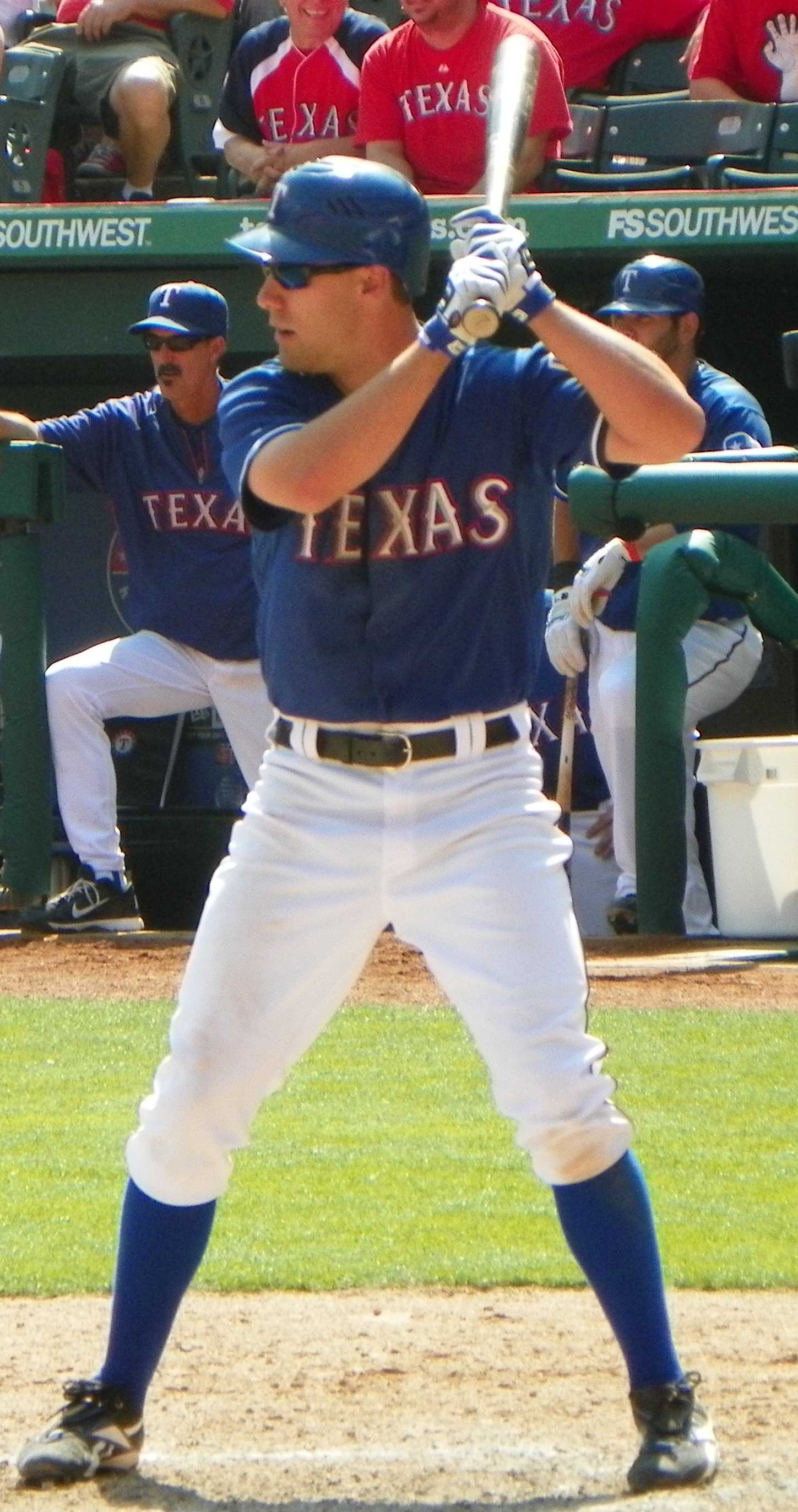
Murphy at bat

On opening day against the Boston Red Sox, Murphy hit a go-ahead, pinch-hit two-run double in the eighth inning that put the Rangers up, 7–5. Texas went on to win that game, 9–5. Two days later, in his first start of the season, he hit a home run against Clay Buchholz.

During the 120 games Murphy played in during the 2011 season, he batted .275 and finished with 11 home runs and 46 RBI. In Game 7 of the 2011 World Series against the St. Louis Cardinals, Murphy was the final out of the series, flying out to Allen Craig in left field. Murphy's out resulted in the Rangers losing their second straight World Series appearance.

==== 2012 ====
Murphy finished the 2012 season with a .304 batting average while slugging 15 home runs and 61 RBI in 147 games. His 4.0 WAR was the highest mark of his career.

==== 2013 ====
Murphy began the season as the starting left fielder. Jeff Baker was his backup throughout most of the season. In September, Craig Gentry and Jim Adduci took most of the starts in left with Gentry starting all of the final 10 games, while Murphy saw a lot of time pinch-hitting. In 142 games (114 starts), Murphy hit .220/.282/.374 with 13 HR and 45 RBI in a down year from 2012.

Murphy made his major league pitching debut on June 4, 2013, against the Boston Red Sox when he took the mound in the eighth inning of a 17–5 rout of the Rangers in an effort to save the bullpen. Murphy notched his first major league strikeout and was the only Rangers pitcher to record a scoreless inning that evening.

=== Cleveland Indians ===
On November 20, 2013, Murphy signed a 2-year, $12 million contract with the Cleveland Indians. The news was first broken by his youngest daughter, Faith. He was involved in the second known occurrence in MLB history of two balls in play simultaneously when he was confused by a ball accidentally thrown from the Cincinnati Reds' bullpen and tagged out before sliding back to third base in the seventh inning of a 9–2 Indians loss at Progressive Field on August 5, 2014.

=== Los Angeles Angels of Anaheim ===
On July 28, 2015, the Indians traded Murphy to the Los Angeles Angels of Anaheim in exchange for minor league shortstop Eric Stamets. He played in 48 games for the Angels and recorded a batting average of .265, with five home runs, 16 runs scored, and 23 RBIs.

=== Return to the Red Sox ===
On February 29, 2016, the Boston Red Sox signed Murphy to a minor league deal. He was released on March 28, 2016.

=== Minnesota Twins ===
On April 14, 2016, the Minnesota Twins signed Murphy to a minor league deal, but on the 25th, Murphy announced his retirement from baseball.

== Broadcasting career ==
Since retiring from baseball, Murphy has worked as a broadcaster for Fox Sports Southwest. He has appeared as an analyst on Rangers LIVE pre and post game shows. He has also worked as a color commentator on Frisco RoughRiders broadcasts.
