= Joe Ortiz =

Venezuelan baseball player (born 1990)

Joseph Ortiz
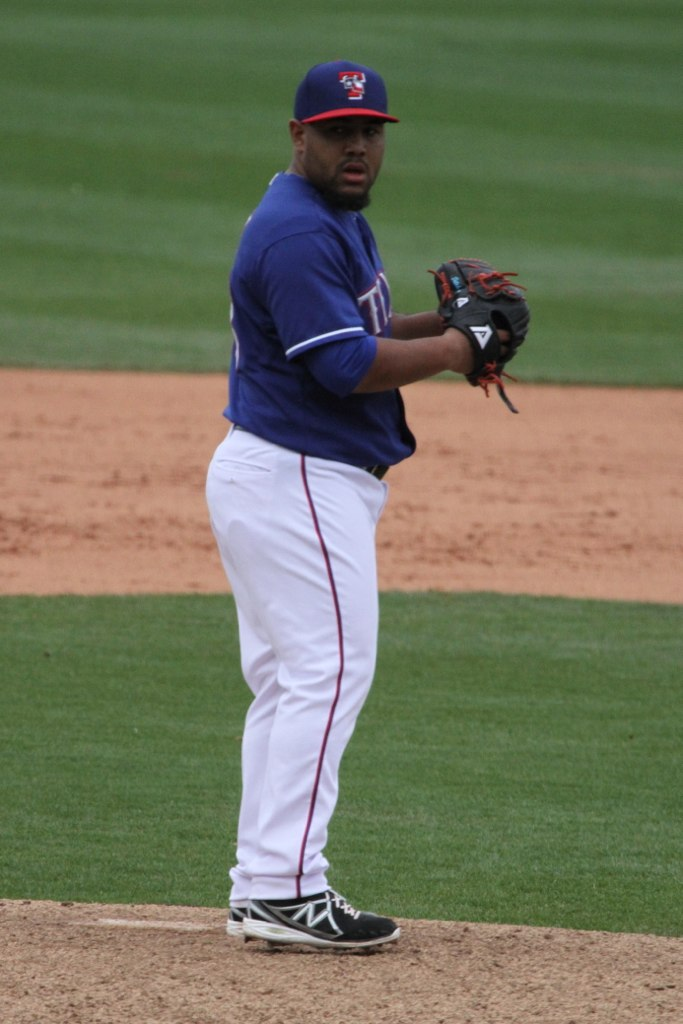
- Ortiz with the Texas Rangers in 2013 spring training
- Pitcher
- Born: August 13, 1990 (age 35); Caracas, Venezuela
- Batted: Left Threw: Left

MLB debut
- March 31, 2013, for the Texas Rangers

Last MLB appearance
- September 20, 2013, for the Texas Rangers

MLB statistics
- Win–loss record: 2–2
- Earned run average: 4.23
- Strikeouts: 27
- Stats at Baseball Reference

Teams
- Texas Rangers (2013)

Joseph Ortiz Blanco (born August 13, 1990) is a Venezuelan former professional baseball pitcher. He played in Major League Baseball (MLB) for one season in 2013 with the Texas Rangers.

== Career ==
=== Texas Rangers ===
On August 28, 2006, Ortiz signed with the Texas Rangers as an international free agent. He made his professional debut in 2007 with the Dominican Summer League Rangers. In 2008, Ortiz split the season between the Arizona League Rangers and the Single-A Clinton LumberKings, posting a 1.91 ERA in 24 games. He split the 2009 season between the Low-A Spokane Indians and the Single-A Hickory Crawdads, pitching to a cumulative 3.38 ERA with 44 strikeouts in 42 2/3 innings of work. The following season, Ortiz split the year between Hickory and the High-A Bakersfield Blaze, where he recorded a 4-1 record and 1.62 ERA in 28 appearances. For the 2011 season, Ortiz played with the High-A Myrtle Beach Pelicans, logging a 5-5 record and 2.15 ERA with 55 strikeouts in 67 innings pitched. In 2012, Ortiz split the year between the Double-A Frisco RoughRiders and the Triple-A Round Rock Express, accumulating a 2-3 record and 2.15 ERA in 51 appearances between the two teams.

Ortiz made the Texas Rangers' Opening Day roster in 2013. He made his MLB debut on March 31, 2013, pitching 1 inning against the Houston Astros, striking out 2 and allowing 1 earned run. He split the 2013 season between Round Rock and Texas, recording a 2-2 record and 4.23 ERA in 32 big league games. Ortiz did not appear in a big league game in 2014, spending most of the season on the disabled list or with Frisco and the AZL Rangers.

=== Chicago Cubs ===
On October 6, 2014, Ortiz was claimed off waivers by the Chicago Cubs. He was assigned to the Triple-A Iowa Cubs to begin the 2015 season. Ortiz was released by the Cubs organization on August 14, 2015, after registering a 5.24 ERA in 38 games with Iowa.

=== Joliet Slammers ===
On February 20, 2017, Ortiz signed with the Joliet Slammers of the Frontier League. Ortiz pitched to a 4-3 record and 5.19 ERA in 19 games with Joliet before he was released by the team on August 12.

== See also ==
- List of Major League Baseball players from Venezuela
