= Tanner Scheppers =

American baseball player (born 1987)

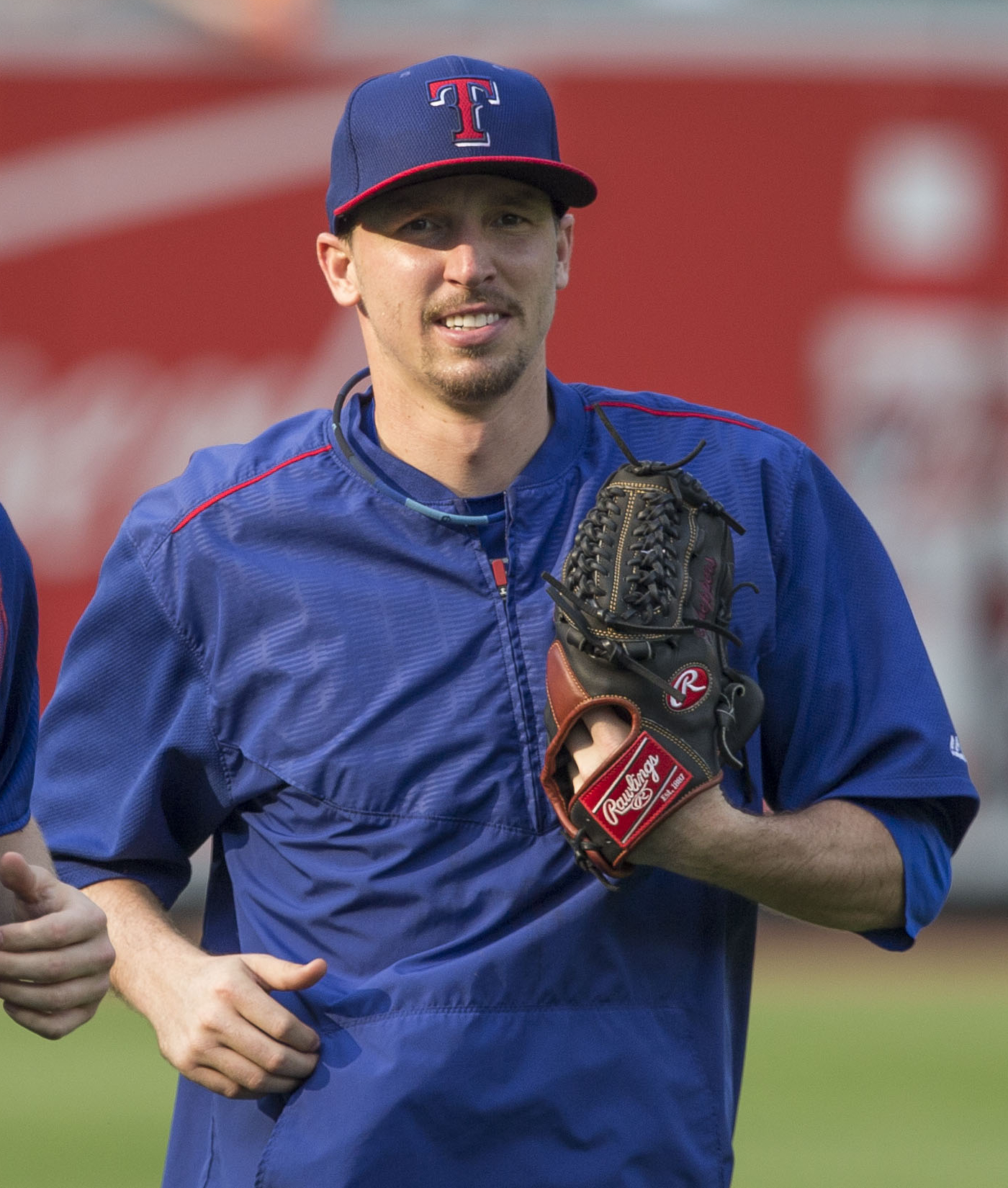
- Scheppers with the Texas Rangers in 2015
- Pitcher
- Born: January 17, 1987 (age 39); Mission Viejo, California, U.S.
- Batted: Right Threw: Right

Professional debut
- MLB: June 7, 2012, for the Texas Rangers
- NPB: March 30, 2018, for the Chiba Lotte Marines

Last appearance
- MLB: June 29, 2017, for the Texas Rangers
- NPB: August 18, 2018, for the Chiba Lotte Marines

MLB statistics
- Win–loss record: 12–7
- Earned run average: 4.25
- Strikeouts: 147

NPB statistics
- Win–loss record: 1-3
- Earned run average: 4.54
- Strikeouts: 34
- Stats at Baseball Reference

Teams
- Texas Rangers (2012–2017); Chiba Lotte Marines (2018)

Tanner Ross Scheppers (born January 17, 1987) is an American former professional baseball pitcher. He played in Major League Baseball (MLB) for the Texas Rangers, and in Nippon Professional Baseball (NPB) for the Chiba Lotte Marines. Prior to playing professionally, he played college baseball at Fresno State.

== Amateur career ==
Scheppers played shortstop at Dana Hills High School in Dana Point, California. When his high school team experienced a shortage of pitchers, Scheppers was pressed into action as a pitcher. The Baltimore Orioles drafted Scheppers in the 29th round of the 2005 Major League Baseball draft, but he opted to attend California State University, Fresno to play for the Fresno State Bulldogs instead. Fresno State recruited Scheppers as a shortstop, but used him as a pitcher.

In 2008, his junior year, Scheppers had an 8–2 win–loss record with a 2.93 earned run average and 109 strikeouts in 70 2/3 innings pitched, and was named the Western Athletic Conference Pitcher of the Year. Fresno State won the 2008 College World Series, though Scheppers did not play in the tournament due to an injured rotator cuff and labrum in his shoulder.

== Professional career ==
Due to the shoulder injury, Scheppers fell in the 2008 Major League Baseball draft to the second round, with the 48th overall selection, where he was selected by the Pittsburgh Pirates. The Pirates offered Scheppers less money than he was hoping for, and he opted not to sign with the Pirates.

=== St. Paul Saints ===
Scheppers signed with the St. Paul Saints of the American Association of Independent Professional Baseball for the 2009 season. In 4 starts 19 innings he went 1-1 with a 3.32 ERA and 20 strikeouts.

=== Texas Rangers ===
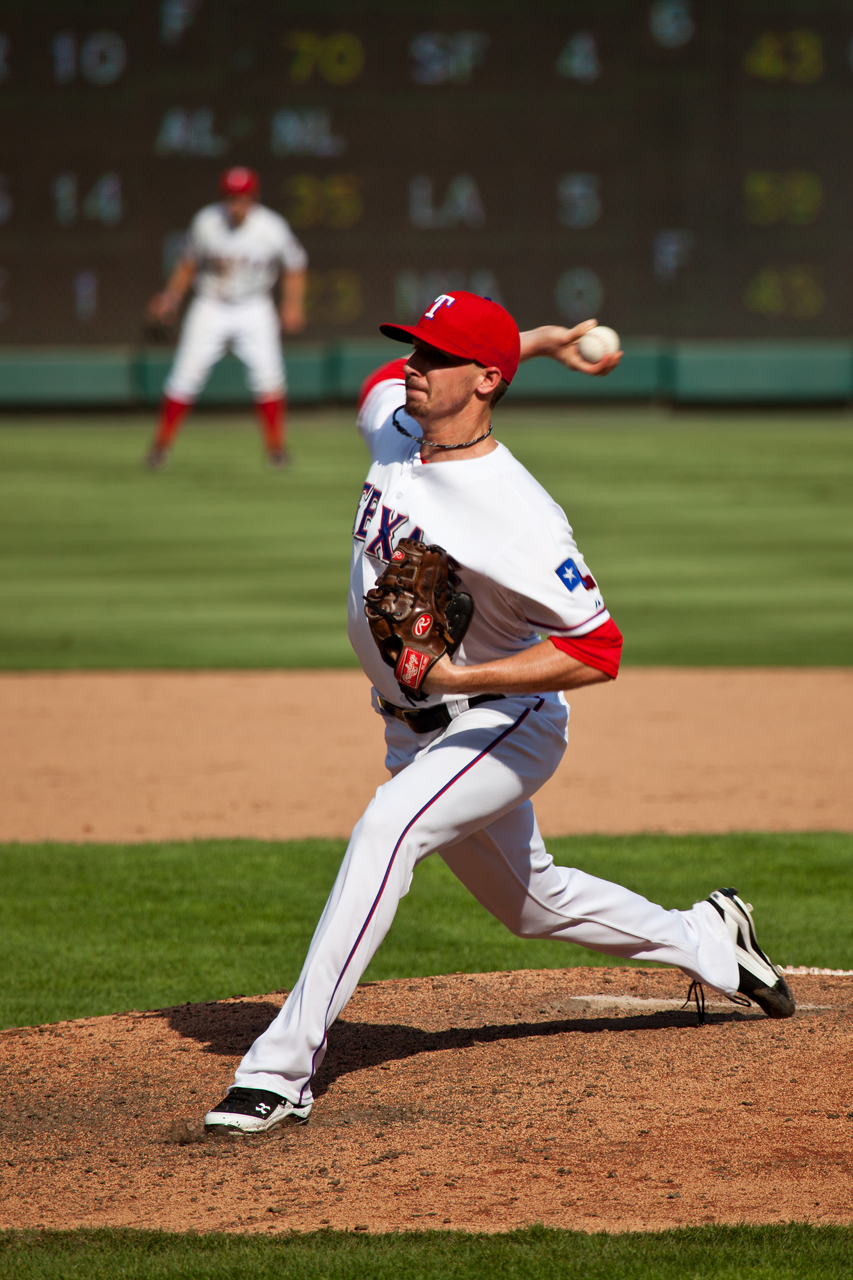
Scheppers pitching for the Rangers

Scheppers was chosen in the supplementary first round, with the 44th overall selection, of the 2009 Major League Baseball draft by the Texas Rangers. Teams passed on him again due to injury concerns, as some believed he had a partially torn labrum, which would require surgery. Scheppers also was the pitching coach for the junior varsity baseball team at Trabuco Hills High School in Mission Viejo, California, for the 2009 season.

On September 17, 2009, Scheppers signed with the Texas Rangers to a minor league deal. Scheppers was selected to represent the United States in the All-Star Futures Game in 2010.

On June 7, 2012, Scheppers was called up to the majors when Derek Holland was placed on the 15-day disabled list. On the same day, he made his Major League debut for the Texas Rangers in relief of Yu Darvish, and gave up a solo home run and struck out 2 in 1 2/3 innings in a 7–1 loss to the Oakland Athletics. Scheppers picked up his first win on August 16, 2012, when the Rangers defeated the New York Yankees. In 2013, Scheppers made 76 relief appearances for the Rangers, tied for the third-most in the American League.

In 2013 Scheppers reported that he was randomly assaulted and "sucker punched" in Cleveland while walking back to the team hotel after dinner. Reports later emerged which indicated that he been in a bar fight and was using the random assault story as a cover.

The Rangers named Scheppers their Opening Day starting pitcher in 2014. However, he experienced right elbow inflammation and went on the disabled list in April, after making four starts. He returned to the Rangers in June as a relief pitcher, and returned to the disabled list with elbow inflammation after making four appearances. Scheppers missed the last two months of the 2015 season with a bone bruise in his left knee.

Scheppers was diagnosed with torn cartilage in his left knee before the 2016 season, and required surgery, which kept him out until September.

He was sent outright to Triple-A Round Rock Express on April 15, 2017. He had his contract purchased on June 19, 2017. He was optioned back to the minor leagues on July 2, 2017. He was designated for assignment on August 26.

Scheppers left the Rangers organization in October 2017, becoming a minor league free agent.

=== Chiba Lotte Marines ===
On January 15, 2018, he signed with the Chiba Lotte Marines of Nippon Professional Baseball. He became a free agent after the season.

=== Long Island Ducks ===
On May 27, 2019, Scheppers signed with the Long Island Ducks of the Atlantic League of Professional Baseball. In 8 games for the Ducks, he struggled to a 9.35 ERA with 10 strikeouts across 8 2/3 innings pitched. Scheppers was released by Long Island on June 22.

Scheppers announced his retirement via Instagram on October 24, 2019.

== See also ==
- List of Texas Rangers Opening Day starting pitchers
