= Nick Tepesch =

American baseball player (born 1988)

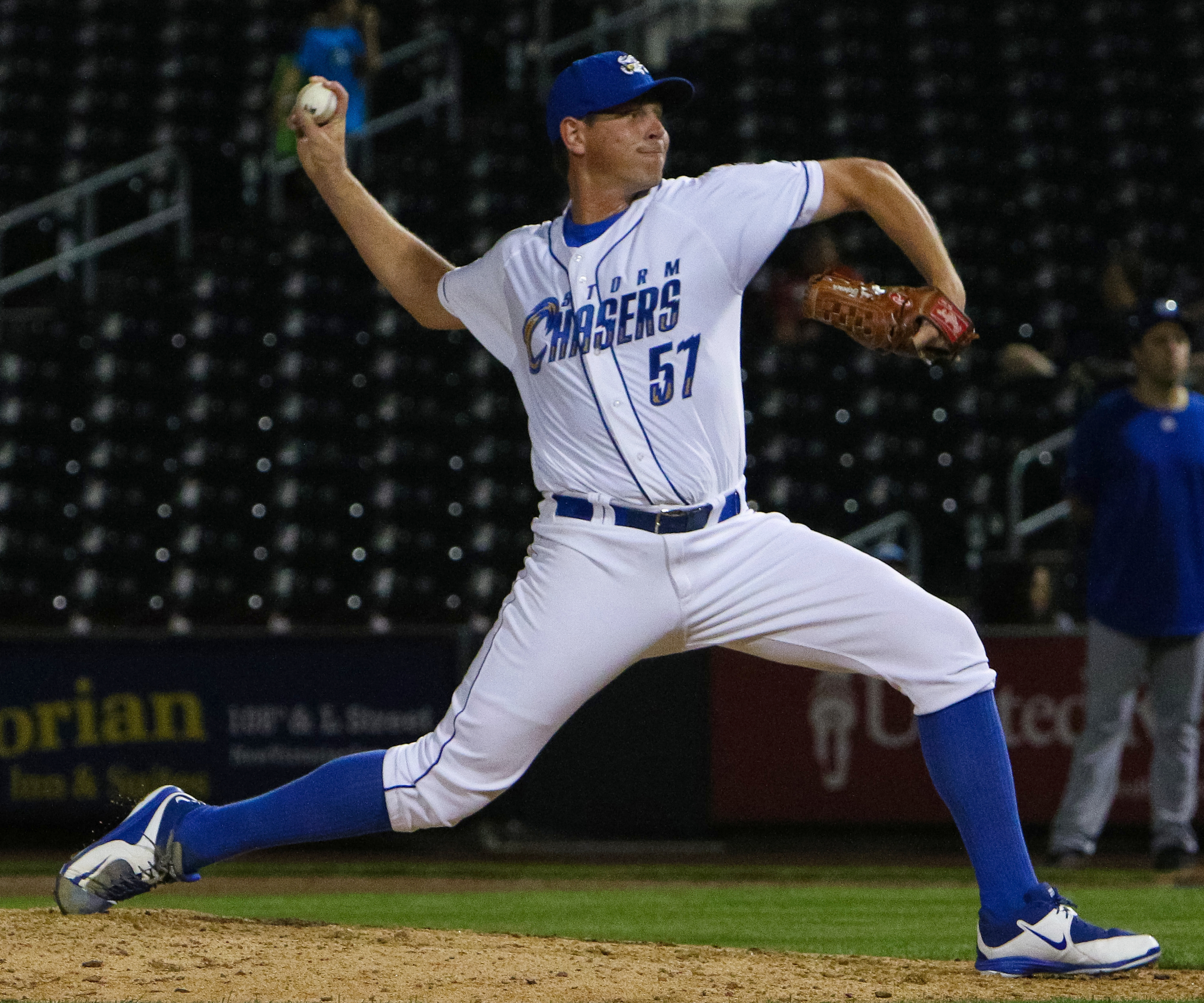
- Tepesch with the Omaha Storm Chasers in 2016
- Pitcher
- Born: October 12, 1988 (age 37); Kansas City, Missouri, U.S.
- Batted: Right Threw: Right

MLB debut
- April 9, 2013, for the Texas Rangers

Last MLB appearance
- August 19, 2017, for the Toronto Blue Jays

MLB statistics
- Win–loss record: 10–20
- Earned run average: 4.71
- Strikeouts: 144
- Stats at Baseball Reference

Teams
- Texas Rangers (2013–2014); Los Angeles Dodgers (2016); Minnesota Twins (2017); Toronto Blue Jays (2017)

Nicholas James Tepesch (born October 12, 1988) is an American former professional baseball pitcher. He played in Major League Baseball (MLB) for the Texas Rangers, Los Angeles Dodgers, Minnesota Twins, and Toronto Blue Jays.

== Career ==
=== Amateur ===
Tepesch was drafted by the Boston Red Sox in the 28th round of the 2007 Major League Baseball draft out of the Blue Springs High School in Blue Springs, Missouri but he did not sign and attended the University of Missouri, where he played college baseball for the Missouri Tigers baseball team. In 2008 and 2009, he played collegiate summer baseball with the Falmouth Commodores of the Cape Cod Baseball League.

=== Texas Rangers ===
==== Minor leagues ====
Tepesch was drafted by the Texas Rangers in the 14th round, with the 436th overall selection, of the 2010 Major League Baseball draft and signed for $400,000.

In 2012, while pitching for the Myrtle Beach Pelicans of the High-A Carolina League, Tepesch and Jimmy Reyes combined to throw the second no-hitter in Pelicans history.

==== Major leagues ====
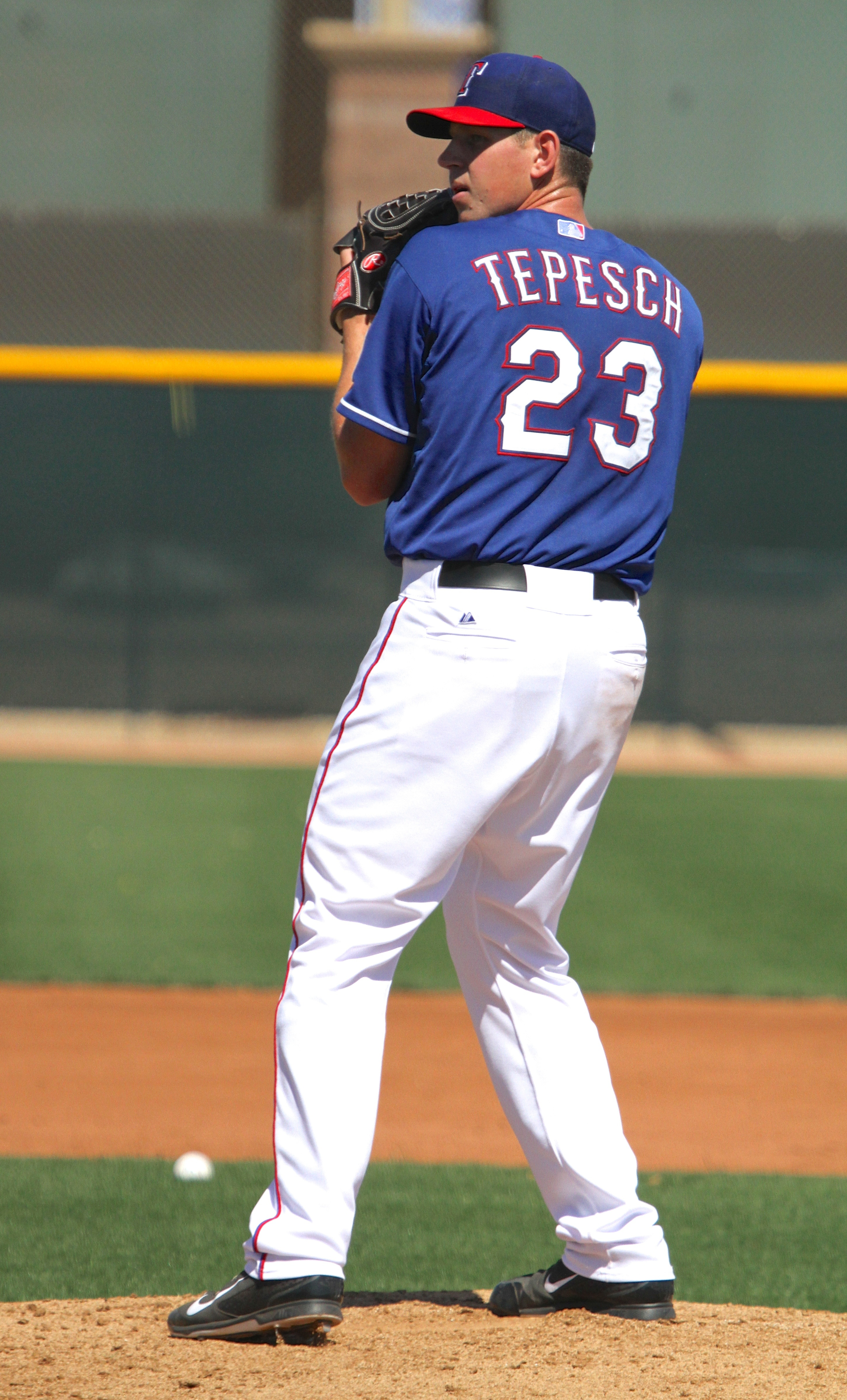
Tepesch with the Texas Rangers in 2014

Invited to spring training in 2013, Tepesch won the Rangers' fifth starter job. On April 9, Tepesch went 7 1/3 innings and gave up four hits, three walks, one run, and struck out five while getting the win in his major league debut against the Tampa Bay Rays. He ended the 2013 season with a record of 4-6 with a 4.84 ERA in 19 games (17 starts). The following season, he started 22 games for the Rangers, going 5-11 in 126 innings.

Tepesch missed the entire 2015 season with inflammation in his throwing elbow. He also underwent surgery for thoracic outlet syndrome.

He was non-tendered at the end of the 2015 season, and had previously rejected a minor league deal. However, on January 27, 2016, Tepesch re-signed with the Rangers on a minor league contract that included an invitation to spring training. In 11 starts for Round Rock, he compiled a 4-2 record and 4.11 ERA with 31 strikeouts across 65 2/3 innings pitched. On June 5, Tepesch requested and was granted his release from the Rangers.

=== Los Angeles Dodgers ===
On June 6, 2016, Tepesch signed a minor league contract with the Los Angeles Dodgers. After three starts for the Triple–A Oklahoma City Dodgers, his contract was purchased by the major league team and he was added to the roster and called up to make a start against the Pittsburgh Pirates on June 24. He allowed five runs on seven hits in four innings to take the loss and was designated for assignment after the game.

=== Oakland Athletics ===
On June 27, 2016, Tepesch was claimed off waivers by the Oakland Athletics. In 3 starts for the Triple-A Nashville Sounds, he posted a 1-1 record and 5.51 ERA with 6 strikeouts across 16 1/3 innings pitched. Tepesch was designated for assignment following the promotion of Ryon Healy on July 15.

=== Kansas City Royals ===
On July 18, 2016, Tepesch was claimed off waivers by the Kansas City Royals. He was designated for assignment on September 6, and later cleared waivers and was sent outright to the Triple-A Omaha Storm Chasers on September 16. In 5 games (2 starts) for Omaha, Tepesch logged a 3.94 ERA with 8 strikeouts across 16 innings of work. He elected free agency following the season on November 7.

=== Minnesota Twins ===
On January 11, 2017, Tepesch signed a minor league contract with the Minnesota Twins. He was assigned to the Triple-A Rochester Red Wings begin the season. On April 24, the Twins selected Tepesch's contract, adding him to their active roster. He started Minnesota's May 6 game against the Boston Red Sox, allowing 7 runs (1 earned) on 5 hits across 1 2/3 innings. Tepesch was released by Minnesota on June 7. On June 13, Tepesch re-signed with the Twins organization on a minor league contract.

=== Toronto Blue Jays ===
On July 23, 2017, Tepesch was traded to the Toronto Blue Jays for cash considerations. He was called up from the Triple-A Buffalo Bisons on August 9 for a start against the New York Yankees where he took the loss. Tepesch was designated for assignment on September 2. He cleared waivers and was sent outright to Triple-A Buffalo Bisons on September 9. Tepesch elected free agency on October 6.

Tepesch re-signed with Toronto on a minor league contract on March 3, 2018, and was invited to spring training. In 10 games (8 starts) for Triple-A Buffalo, he struggled to a 1-6 record and 7.90 ERA with 20 strikeouts across 41 innings pitched.

=== Detroit Tigers ===
On August 8, 2018, Tepesch was traded to the Detroit Tigers in exchange for cash considerations, and assigned to the Double-A Erie SeaWolves. Tepesch appeared in just 8 games for the SeaWolves before he was released on August 27.

=== Lincoln Saltdogs ===
On March 19, 2019, Tepesch signed with the Lincoln Saltdogs of the independent American Association of Independent Professional Baseball. In 10 starts for Lincoln, he compiled a 6-4 record and 4.84 ERA with 42 strikeouts across 61 1/3 innings pitched. On August 10, Tepesch retired from professional baseball after securing a victory for the Saltdogs.
