= Craig Gentry =

American baseball player (born 1983)

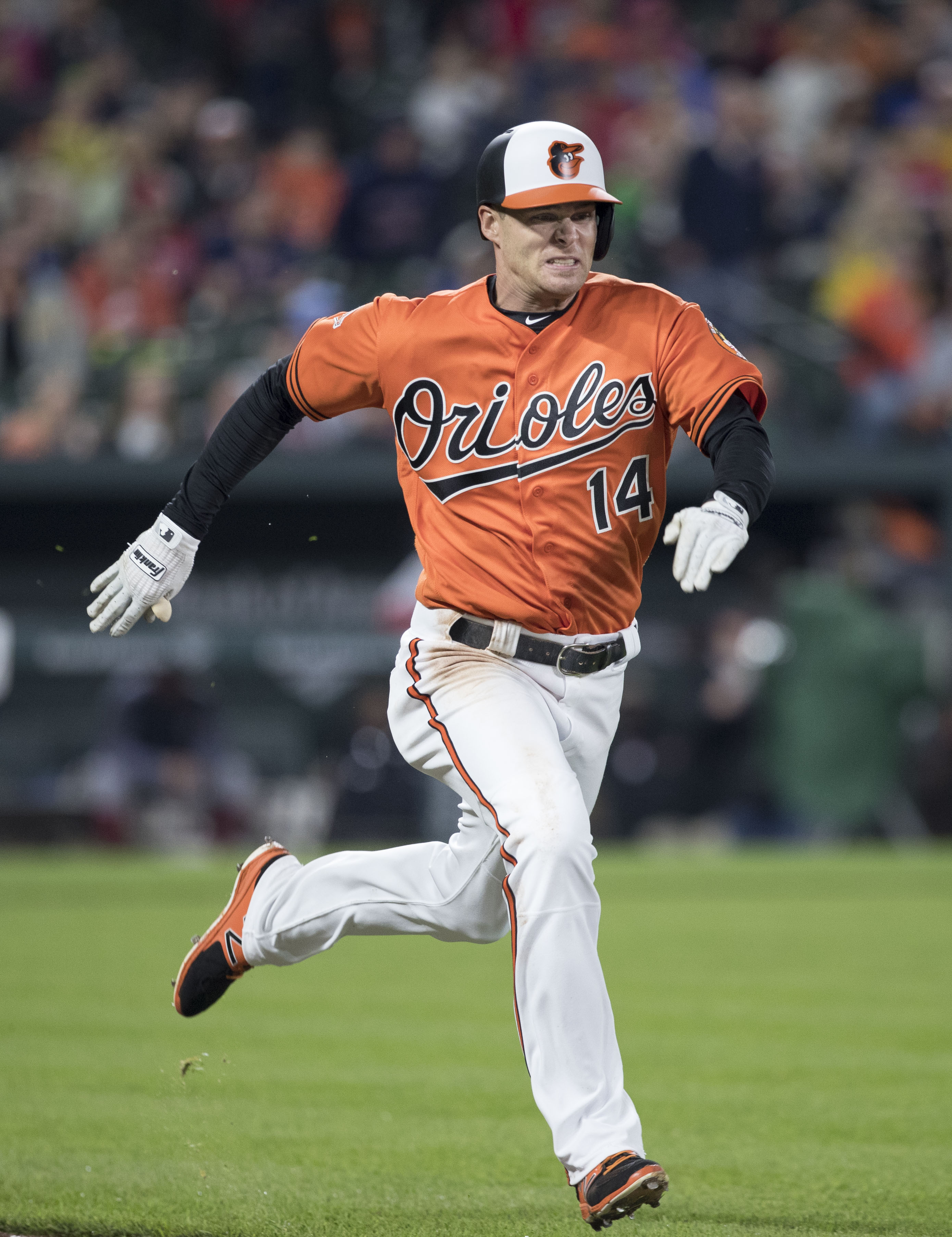
- Gentry with the Baltimore Orioles
- Outfielder
- Born: November 29, 1983 (age 42); Fort Smith, Arkansas, U.S.
- Batted: Right Threw: Right

MLB debut
- September 6, 2009, for the Texas Rangers

Last MLB appearance
- August 29, 2018, for the Baltimore Orioles

MLB statistics
- Batting average: .262
- Home runs: 7
- Runs batted in: 104
- Stats at Baseball Reference

Teams
- Texas Rangers (2009–2013); Oakland Athletics (2014–2015); Los Angeles Angels (2016); Baltimore Orioles (2017–2018)

Craig Alan Gentry (born November 29, 1983) is an American former professional baseball outfielder. He played in Major League Baseball (MLB) for the Texas Rangers, Oakland Athletics, Los Angeles Angels and Baltimore Orioles.

== Baseball career ==
=== Texas Rangers ===
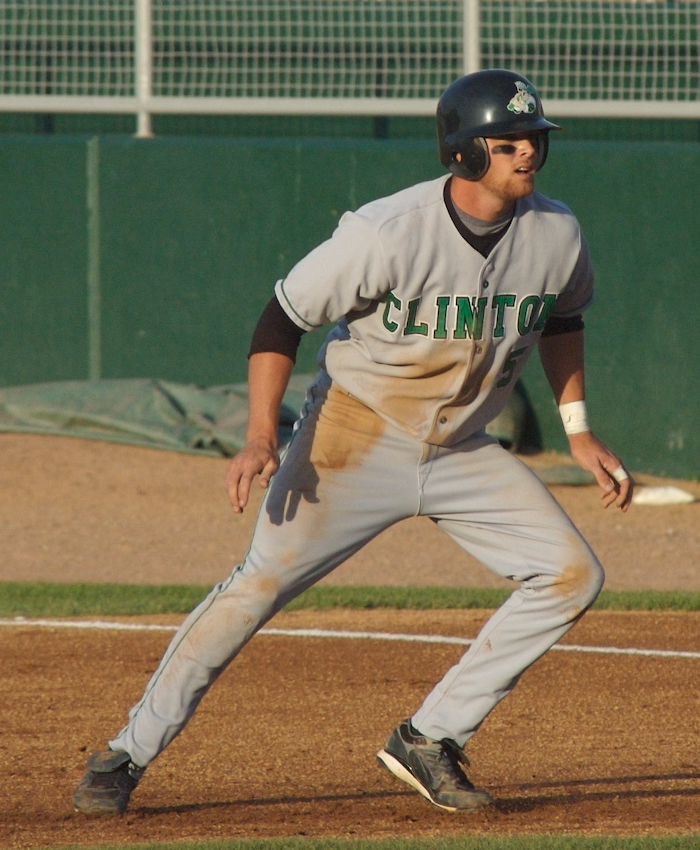
Gentry during his tenure with the Clinton LumberKings, Single-A affiliates of the Texas Rangers, in 2007

Gentry was a multi-sport athlete at Fort Smith Christian High School, and then attended the University of Arkansas – Fort Smith during his freshman and sophomore years. He then attended the University of Arkansas, where he played college baseball for the Arkansas Razorbacks baseball team. The Texas Rangers selected him in the 10th round (298th overall) of the 2006 MLB draft.

The Rangers promoted Gentry to the majors on September 1, 2009, but he did not see significant playing time. He began the 2010 season with the AAA Oklahoma City RedHawks, but was called up to the majors on April 27 due to Nelson Cruz being placed on the 15-day disabled list. On May 15, he was optioned back to Oklahoma City.

In 2011, Gentry batted .271 in 133 at-bats, with 18 steals in 18 attempts. He hit his first MLB triple on September 11 against the Oakland Athletics. A few days later, on September 23, he hit his first Major League home run, an inside-the-park home run against the Seattle Mariners. At the end of the season, he was named the Rangers' Rookie of the Year.

In 2012, Gentry batted .304, a career high. He also hit his first outside-the-park home run, a two-run homer to left in Toronto on April 30. Gentry pitched the final inning of a 12–1 loss at the hands of the Oakland Athletics on June 4. He allowed two runs on three hits and a walk.

In 2013, Gentry hit two home runs, stole 24 bases and had an on-base percentage of .373, all career highs. He broke his left hand in June against the Oakland Athletics on a bunt attempt. Gentry was named Rangers' player of the month in September after batting .354 with 10 stolen bases, 10 runs, 2 doubles, a triple and four RBI. He also won the Rangers' Wilson Defensive Player of the Year Award. In 102 games, he committed 2 errors, had 7 outfield assists, saved 12 runs and had the best UZR on the team.

=== Oakland Athletics ===
On December 3, 2013, Gentry, along with pitcher Josh Lindblom, was traded to the Oakland Athletics for outfielder Michael Choice and infielder Chris Bostick.

Gentry missed much of spring training in 2014, due to a lower back strain he suffered on the first day of workouts. Gentry played most of the season with a sore knee. On July 27, he suffered a broken right hand when hit by a pitch during a bunt attempt against the Texas Rangers. Although the injury occurred during the second inning, he played the entire game including four more plate appearances. On September 9, Gentry suffered a season-ending concussion after a collision at first base with Carlos Sanchez of the Chicago White Sox. Due to his injuries, Gentry played in only 94 games, batting .254/.319/.289. He still managed to finish the season with 20 stolen bases which made him Oakland's leader in that category.

After hitting .120/.196/.200 with no home runs and 3 RBIs in 50 at bats over 26 games for the A's in 2015, Gentry was sent down to AAA. He remained in AAA for the rest of the season and was designated for assignment after the season.

=== Los Angeles Angels ===
Gentry signed a one-year deal with the Los Angeles Angels on December 9, 2015. He began the 2016 season as a platoon player in LF with Daniel Nava. His struggles from 2015 continued into the 2016 season as Gentry began the season 5-for-34 at the plate and on May 1, was placed on the disabled list. On July 30, Gentry was designated for assignment by the Angels and released on August 3, after declining an outright assignment. For the season, in 34 at bats he hit .147/.237/.176 with no home runs and 2 RBIs.

=== Baltimore Orioles ===
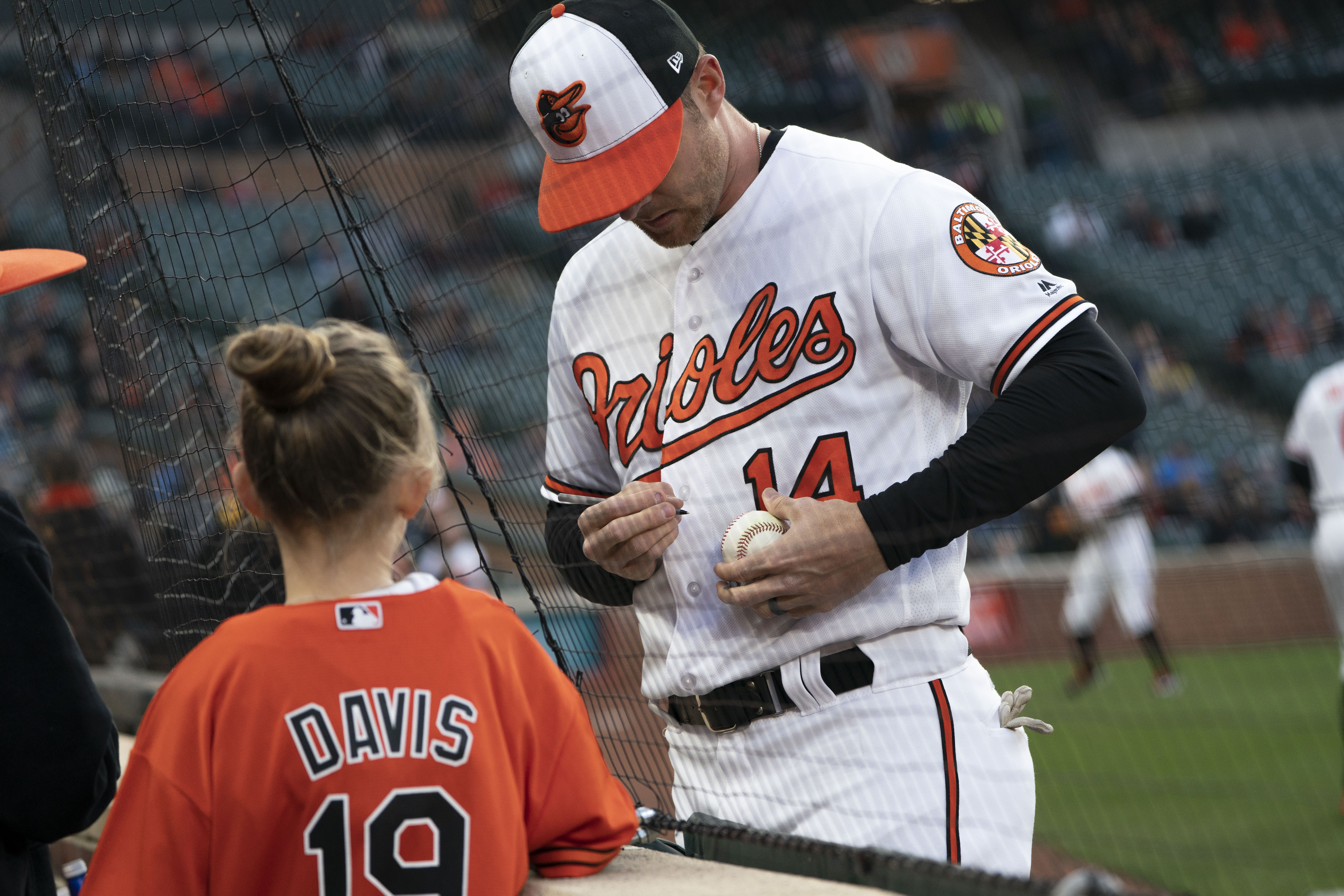
Gentry autographing a baseball for a young fan in 2018

Gentry signed a minor league contract with the Baltimore Orioles on February 18, 2017. On April 16, Gentry hit his first home run with the Orioles, a two-run blast off Matt Dermody. Gentry hit a walk-off single on July 31 against Joakim Soria of the Kansas City Royals.

Gentry signed another minor league contract with the Orioles on February 7, 2018. His contract was purchased by the Orioles on March 29, 2018. On the same day his contract was purchased, opening day occurred against the Minnesota Twins, where Gentry robbed Eddie Rosario of a home run in right field. The Orioles won 3-2. He was designated for assignment on August 31, 2018. He hit .269 with a home run and 12 stolen bases. He was released on September 5, 2018.

=== San Francisco Giants ===
On February 14, 2019, Gentry signed a minor league contract with the San Francisco Giants. He was released on March 26, 2019.

=== Colorado Rockies ===
On April 9, 2019, Gentry signed a minor league deal with the Colorado Rockies.

== Retirement ==
On May 2, 2019, Gentry announced his retirement from baseball.
