= List of Texas Rangers no-hitters =

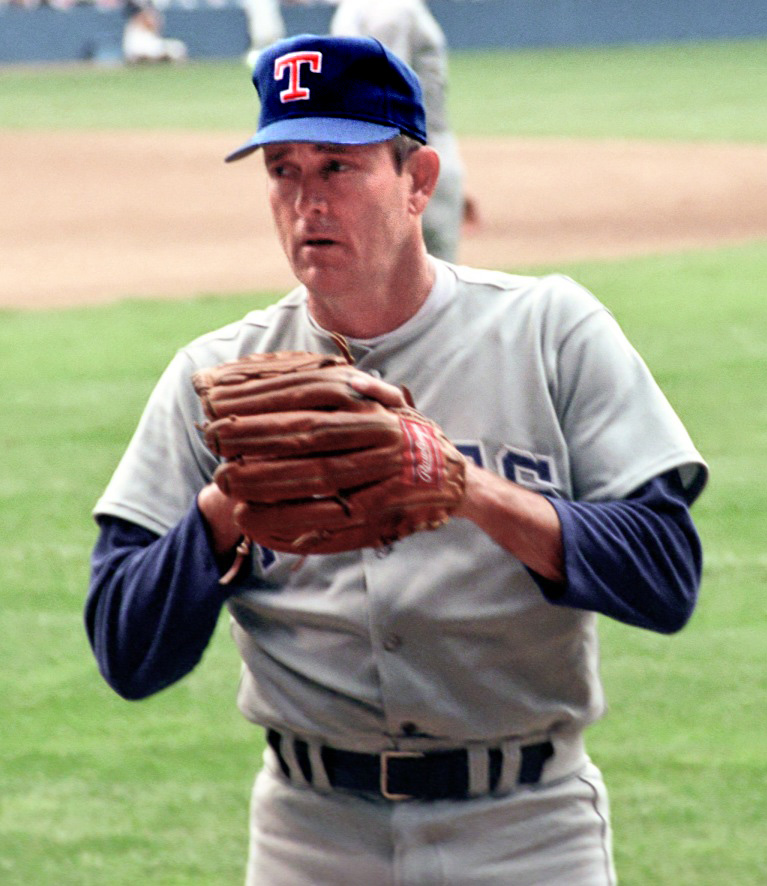
Nolan Ryan pitched two no-hitters with the Rangers.

The Texas Rangers are a Major League Baseball franchise based in Arlington, Texas, near Dallas. Formed in 1961, they play in the American League West division. Known as the Washington Senators from 1961 to 1971, pitchers for the Rangers have thrown five no-hitters throughout their franchise history. A no-hitter is officially recognized by Major League Baseball only "when a pitcher (or pitchers) allows no hits during the entire course of a game, which consists of at least nine innings", though one or more batters "may reach base via a walk, an error, a hit by pitch, a passed ball or wild pitch on strike three, or catcher's interference". No-hitters of less than nine complete innings were previously recognized by the league as official; however, several rule alterations in 1991 meant the exclusion of no-hit games of less than nine innings. Kenny Rogers threw the only perfect game, a special subcategory of no-hitter, in Rangers history on July 28, 1994. It remains their most recent no-hitter as of 2023. As defined by Major League Baseball, "in a perfect game, no batter reaches any base during the course of the game."

The umpire is also an integral part of any no-hitter. The task of the umpire in a baseball game is to make any decision "which involves judgment, such as, but not limited to, whether a batted ball is fair or foul, whether a pitch is a strike or a ball, or whether a runner is safe or out... [the umpire's judgment on such matters] is final." Part of the duties of the umpire making calls at home plate includes defining the strike zone, which "is defined as that area over homeplate (sic) the upper limit of which is a horizontal line at the midpoint between the top of the shoulders and the top of the uniform pants, and the lower level is a line at the hollow beneath the kneecap." These calls define every baseball game and are therefore integral to the completion of any no-hitter.

The manager is another integral part of any no-hitter. The tasks of the manager include determining the starting rotation as well as batting order and defensive lineup every game.

== No-hitters ==
Key
¶	Indicates a perfect game
£	Pitcher was left-handed
*	Member of the National Baseball Hall of Fame and Museum
BR	Number of base runners by the opposing team

No-hitters
No.	Date	Pitcher	Score	BR	Opponent	Catcher	Plate umpire	Manager	Notes	Ref.
1	July 30, 1973	Jim Bibby	6–0	6	@ Oakland Athletics	Dick Billings	Art Frantz	Whitey Herzog	First Rangers no-hitter; First Rangers no-hitter on the road; Largest margin of victory in a Rangers no-hitter (6 runs, tie)	
2	September 22, 1977	Bert Blyleven*	6–0	2	@ California Angels	Jim Sundberg	Fred Spenn	Billy Hunter	Largest margin of victory in a Rangers no-hitter (6 runs, tie)	
3	June 11, 1990	Nolan Ryan* (1)	5–0	2	@ Oakland Athletics	John Russell	Don Denkinger	Bobby Valentine (1)	Longest interval between Rangers no-hitters (12 years, 6 months, and 20 days); Sixth of seven no-hitters for Ryan	
4	May 1, 1991	Nolan Ryan* (2)	3–0	2	Toronto Blue Jays	Mike Stanley	Tim Tschida	Bobby Valentine (2)	First Rangers no-hitter at home; Smallest margin of victory in a Rangers no-hitter (3 runs); Shortest interval between Rangers no-hitters (10 months and 20 days); Last of seven no-hitters for Ryan; At 44, Ryan is the oldest pitcher to throw a no-hitter.	
5	July 28, 1994	Kenny Rogers^{£¶}	4–0	0	California Angels	Iván Rodríguez	Ed Bean	Kevin Kennedy	First and only Rangers perfect game; 14th perfect game in MLB history; Most recent Rangers no-hitter (32 years and 21 days ago)	
