= List of Major League Baseball perfect games =

Lee Richmond, pitcher of the first perfect game in major league history

Over the 151 years of Major League Baseball history, and over 243,700 games played, there have been 24 official perfect games by the current definition. No pitcher has thrown more than one. The perfect game thrown by Don Larsen in Game 5 of the 1956 World Series is the only postseason perfect game in major league history and one of only three postseason no-hitters. The first two major league perfect games, and the only two of the premodern era, were thrown in 1880, five days apart. The frequency of perfect games has significantly increased since 1981. Fifteen perfect games were thrown in the 44 seasons from 1980 through 2023, while only nine were thrown in the 100-plus prior seasons. There were three perfect games in 2012; the only other year of the modern era in which as many as two were thrown was 2010. By contrast, there have been spans of 23 and 33 consecutive seasons in which no perfect game was thrown. Though two perfect-game bids have gone into extra innings, no extra-inning game has been completed to perfection.

== History ==
The first two perfect games occurred under rules that differed in many important respects from those of today's game: in 1880, for example, only underhand pitching—from a flat, marked-out box 45 feet from home plate—was allowed, it took eight balls to draw a walk, and a batter was not awarded first base if hit by a pitch. Lee Richmond, a left-handed pitcher for the Worcester Ruby Legs, threw the first perfect game. He played professional baseball for six years and pitched full-time for only three, finishing with a losing record. The second perfect game was thrown by John Montgomery Ward for the Providence Grays. Ward, a decent pitcher who became an excellent position player, went on to be inducted into the Baseball Hall of Fame.

Though convention has it that the modern era of Major League Baseball begins in 1900, the essential rules of the modern game were in place by the 1893 season. That year the pitching distance was moved back to 60 feet, 6 inches, where it remains, and the pitcher's box was replaced by a rubber slab against which the pitcher was required to place his rear foot. Two other changes in crucial rules had been made in years shortly before that: In 1887, the rule awarding a hit batsman first base was instituted in the National League (this had been the rule in the American Association since 1884: first by the umpire's judgment of the impact; as of the following year, virtually automatically) and in 1889, the number of balls required for a walk was reduced to four. Thus, from 1893 on, perfect games occurred under fundamental rules identical to today, with four significant exceptions: counting a foul ball as a first or second strike, enforced by the National League as of 1901 and by the American League two years later; the use of the designated hitter in American League games (and interleague games played with the American League team as the home team) since the 1973 season and National League games starting with the 2022 season; the tiebreaker rule of a runner on second starting with the tenth inning in 2020; and the use of the pitch clock and batter clock starting in 2023.

== Pitchers ==
During baseball's modern era, 22 pitchers have thrown perfect games. Most were accomplished major leaguers. Seven have been inducted into the Baseball Hall of Fame: Cy Young, Addie Joss, Jim Bunning, Sandy Koufax, Catfish Hunter, Randy Johnson, and Roy Halladay.

David Cone won the Cy Young Award once, pitched a 19-strikeout game, was part of five World Series winning teams, and was named to five All-Star teams. Félix Hernández is likewise a one-time Cy Young winner, as well as a six-time All-Star. Four other perfect-game throwers, Dennis Martínez, Kenny Rogers, David Wells and Mark Buehrle, each won over 200 major league games.

Others include Matt Cain, a three-time All-Star, who pitched well in the postseason for two World Series–winning Giants teams. Mike Witt was a two-time All-Star who finished 3rd for the 1986 Cy Young Award, going 117–116. Tom Browning was a one-time All-Star with a career record of 123–90, and pitched for the 1990 World Series winning Cincinnati Reds.

Don Larsen, Charlie Robertson, and Len Barker were journeyman pitchers—each finished his major-league career with a losing record; Barker made one All-Star team, Larsen none (Robertson played his entire career before the establishment of the MLB All-Star Game).

Dallas Braden retired with a 26–36 record after five seasons due to a shoulder injury. Philip Humber's perfect game was the only complete game he recorded, and his major league career, in which he went 16–23, ended the year after he threw it. Domingo German threw his perfect game following a start in which he allowed 10 runs in 3 and one-third innings.

== Major League Baseball perfect games ==
In what follows, the number before the letter K denotes the number of strikeouts in the game. RHP and LHP stand for right-handed pitcher and left-handed pitcher, respectively, and the number following that designation is the age of the pitcher at the time of the game.

=== 19th century ===
The pitching rules in effect in 1880 were very different from those of the modern game. Only underhand pitching was permitted, and the batter had the right to call for the ball high, low, or "middle" (belt-high). There was no strike zone; whether a pitch was "good" or "unfair" was left to the umpire's sole discretion, and foul balls were not counted as strikes. The pitching distance was 45 feet (that however was the front edge of the 6-foot-deep pitcher's box, not the push-off point represented by the modern pitching rubber).

	Pitcher	Date	Game Details
1	Lee Richmond (WOR); LHP, 23; 5 K	June 12, 1880	Cleveland Blues, 0 at Worcester Worcesters, 1; Venue: Worcester Agricultural Fairgrounds; Attendance: 700; Time: 1:26; Caught by: Charlie Bennett; Umpired by: Foghorn Bradley; Box score
2	John Montgomery Ward (PRO); RHP, 20; 5 K	June 17, 1880	Providence Grays, 5 vs. Buffalo Bisons, 0; Venue: Messer Street Grounds; Attendance: 1800; Time: n.a.; Caught by: Emil Gross; Umpired by: Charles F. Daniels; Box score

==== Lee Richmond ====
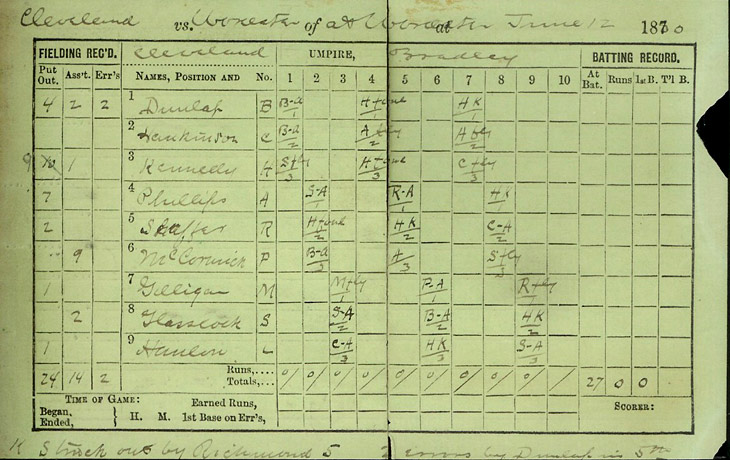
Scorecard for Richmond's perfect game: "R-A" notation in fifth inning represents the 9–3 putout

Richmond was pitching in his first full season in the big leagues after appearing in one game in 1879. He was apparently considered a good hitter, as he batted second in the lineup. His perfect game featured an unusual 9–3 putout, with Worcester right fielder Lon Knight throwing out Cleveland's Bill Phillips at first. The play came on one of three balls Cleveland hit out of the infield. Three outs were recorded on "foul bounds": balls caught after bouncing once in foul territory (the foul bound rule was eliminated three years later). In the seventh inning, the game was delayed for seven minutes due to rain; Richmond dried the ball off with sawdust when he returned to the mound. A monument marks the site of the Worcester Agricultural Fairgrounds where the game took place, located on the campus of the now-closed Becker College. The feat was recognized as unusual: a newspaper report described it as "the most wonderful game on record".

==== John Montgomery Ward ====
Monte Ward threw his perfect game at the Grays' park in Providence, but Buffalo, by virtue of a coin toss, which was the custom under the rules at that time, was officially the "home" team, batting in the bottom of each inning. At the age of 20 years, 105 days, Ward is the youngest pitcher to throw a perfect game. He batted sixth in the lineup. Beginning in 1881, the year after his perfect game, Ward spent more time as a position player than a pitcher; in 1885, following an arm injury, he became a full-time infielder. The five days between Ward's game and Richmond's is the shortest amount of time between major-league perfect games.

=== Modern era (1901–present) ===
	Pitcher	Date	Game Details
3	Cy Young (BOS); RHP, 37; 8 K	May 5, 1904	Philadelphia Athletics, 0 at Boston Americans, 3; Venue: Huntington Avenue Grounds, day game; Attendance: 10,267; Time: 1:25; Caught by: Lou Criger; Umpired by: Frank Dwyer; Box score
4	Addie Joss (CLE); RHP, 28; 74 pitches, 3 K	October 2, 1908	Chicago White Sox, 0 at Cleveland Naps, 1; Venue: League Park, day game; Attendance: 10,598; Time: 1:32; Caught by: Nig Clarke; Umpired by: Tommy Connolly; Box score
5	Charlie Robertson (CWS); RHP, 26; 90 pitches, 6 K	April 30, 1922	Chicago White Sox, 2 at Detroit Tigers, 0; Venue: Navin Field, day game; Attendance: 25,000; Time: 1:55; Caught by: Ray Schalk; Umpires: HP: Dick Nallin; 2B: Billy Evans; Box score
6	Don Larsen (NYY); RHP, 27; 97 pitches, 7 K	October 8, 1956	Brooklyn Dodgers, 0 at New York Yankees, 2; Venue: Yankee Stadium, day game (Game 5 of the World Series); Attendance: 64,519; Time: 2:06; Caught by: Yogi Berra; Umpires: HP: Babe Pinelli; 1B: Hank Soar; 2B: Dusty Boggess; 3B: Larry Napp; LF: Tom Gorman; RF: Ed Runge; Box score and play-by-play
7	Jim Bunning (PHI); RHP, 32; 90 pitches, 10 K	June 21, 1964	Philadelphia Phillies, 6 at New York Mets, 0; Venue: Shea Stadium, day game (first game of doubleheader); Attendance: 32,026; Time: 2:19; Caught by: Gus Triandos; Umpires: HP: Ed Sudol; 1B: Paul Pryor; 2B: Frank Secory; 3B: Ken Burkhart; Box score and play-by-play
8	Sandy Koufax (LAD); LHP, 29; 113 pitches, 14 K	September 9, 1965	Chicago Cubs, 0 at Los Angeles Dodgers, 1; Venue: Dodger Stadium, night game; Attendance: 29,139; Time: 1:43; Caught by: Jeff Torborg; Umpires: HP: Ed Vargo; 1B: Chris Pelekoudas; 2B: Bill Jackowski; 3B: Paul Pryor; Box score and play-by-play
9	Catfish Hunter (OAK); RHP, 22; 107 pitches, 11 K	May 8, 1968	Minnesota Twins, 0 at Oakland Athletics, 4; Venue: Oakland–Alameda County Coliseum, night game; Attendance: 6,298; Time: 2:28; Caught by: Jim Pagliaroni; Umpires: HP: Jerry Neudecker; 1B: Larry Napp; 2B: Al Salerno; 3B: Bill Haller; Box score and play-by-play
10	Len Barker (CLE); RHP, 25; 103 pitches, 11 K	May 15, 1981	Toronto Blue Jays, 0 at Cleveland Indians, 3; Venue: Cleveland Stadium, night game; Attendance: 7,290; Time: 2:09; Caught by: Ron Hassey (1); Umpires: HP: Rich Garcia; 1B: Greg Kosc (1); 2B: Don Denkinger (1); 3B: Jim McKean; Box score and play-by-play
11	Mike Witt (CAL); RHP, 24; 94 pitches, 10 K	September 30, 1984	California Angels, 1 at Texas Rangers, 0; Venue: Arlington Stadium, day game; Attendance: 8,375; Time: 1:49; Caught by: Bob Boone; Umpires: HP: Greg Kosc (2); 1B: Ted Hendry; 2B: Drew Coble; 3B: Jim Evans; Box score and play-by-play
12	Tom Browning (CIN); LHP, 28; 100 pitches, 7 K	September 16, 1988	Los Angeles Dodgers, 0 at Cincinnati Reds, 1; Venue: Riverfront Stadium, night game; Attendance: 16,591; Time: 1:51; Caught by: Jeff Reed; Umpires: HP: Jim Quick; 1B: Mark Hirschbeck; 2B: John Kibler; 3B: Eric Gregg; Box score and play-by-play
13	Dennis Martínez (MON); RHP, 36; 95 pitches, 5 K	July 28, 1991	Montreal Expos, 2 at Los Angeles Dodgers, 0; Venue: Dodger Stadium, day game; Attendance: 45,560; Time: 2:14; Caught by: Ron Hassey (2); Umpires: HP: Larry Poncino (1); 1B: Bruce Froemming; 2B: Dana DeMuth; 3B: Greg Bonin; Box score and play-by-play
14	Kenny Rogers (TEX); LHP, 29; 98 pitches, 8 K	July 28, 1994	California Angels, 0 at Texas Rangers, 4; Venue: The Ballpark in Arlington, night game; Attendance: 46,581; Time: 2:08; Caught by: Iván Rodríguez; Umpires: HP: Ed Bean; 1B: Don Denkinger (2); 2B: John Shulock; 3B: Tim Tschida; Box score and play-by-play
15	David Wells (NYY); LHP, 34; 120 pitches, 11 K	May 17, 1998	Minnesota Twins, 0 at New York Yankees, 4; Venue: Yankee Stadium, day game; Attendance: 49,820; Time: 2:40; Caught by: Jorge Posada; Umpires: HP: Tim McClelland (1); 1B: John Hirschbeck; 2B: Rich Garcia; 3B: Mike Reilly (1); Box score and play-by-play
16	David Cone (NYY); RHP, 36; 88 pitches, 10 K	July 18, 1999	Montreal Expos, 0 at New York Yankees, 6; Venue: Yankee Stadium, day game; Attendance: 41,930; Time: 2:16 (with a 33-minute rain delay); Caught by: Joe Girardi; Umpires: HP: Ted Barrett (1); 1B: Larry McCoy; 2B: Jim Evans; 3B: Chuck Meriwether (1); Box score and play-by-play
17	Randy Johnson (AZ); LHP, 40; 117 pitches, 13 K	May 18, 2004	Arizona Diamondbacks, 2 at Atlanta Braves, 0; Venue: Turner Field, night game; Attendance: 23,381; Time: 2:13; Caught by: Robby Hammock; Umpires: HP: Greg Gibson; 1B: Bruce Dreckman; 2B: Gerry Davis; 3B: Larry Poncino (2); Box score and play-by-play
18	Mark Buehrle (CWS); LHP, 30; 116 pitches, 6 K	July 23, 2009	Tampa Bay Rays, 0 at Chicago White Sox, 5; Venue: U.S. Cellular Field, day game; Attendance: 28,036; Time: 2:03; Caught by: Ramón Castro; Umpires: HP: Eric Cooper; 1B: Mike Reilly (2); 2B: Chuck Meriwether (2); 3B: Laz Díaz; Box score and play-by-play
19	Dallas Braden (OAK); LHP, 26; 109 pitches, 6 K	May 9, 2010	Tampa Bay Rays, 0 at Oakland Athletics, 4; Venue: Oakland–Alameda County Coliseum, day game; Attendance: 12,288; Time: 2:07; Caught by: Landon Powell; Umpires: HP: Jim Wolf; 1B: Derryl Cousins; 2B: Jim Joyce; 3B: Todd Tichenor; Box score and play-by-play
20	Roy Halladay (PHI); RHP, 33; 115 pitches, 11 K	May 29, 2010	Philadelphia Phillies, 1 at Florida Marlins, 0; Venue: Sun Life Stadium, night game; Attendance: 25,086; Time: 2:13; Caught by: Carlos Ruiz; Umpires: HP: Mike DiMuro; 1B: Tim Welke; 2B: Jim Reynolds; 3B: Bill Welke; Box score and play-by-play
21	Philip Humber (CWS); RHP, 29; 96 pitches, 9 K	April 21, 2012	Chicago White Sox, 4 at Seattle Mariners, 0; Venue: Safeco Field, day game; Attendance: 22,472; Time: 2:17; Caught by: A. J. Pierzynski; Umpires: HP: Brian Runge (1); 1B: Marvin Hudson; 2B: Tim McClelland (2); 3B: Ted Barrett (2); Box score and play-by-play
22	Matt Cain (SF); RHP, 27; 125 pitches, 14 K	June 13, 2012	Houston Astros, 0 at San Francisco Giants, 10; Venue: AT&T Park, night game; Attendance: 42,298; Time: 2:36; Caught by: Buster Posey; Umpires: HP: Ted Barrett (3); 1B: Mike Muchlinski; 2B: Angel Campos; 3B: Brian Runge (2); Box score and play-by-play
23	Félix Hernández (SEA); RHP, 26; 113 pitches, 12 K	August 15, 2012	Tampa Bay Rays, 0 at Seattle Mariners, 1; Venue: Safeco Field, day game; Attendance: 21,889; Time: 2:22; Caught by: John Jaso; Umpires: HP: Rob Drake; 1B: Joe West; 2B: Sam Holbrook; 3B: Andy Fletcher; Box score and play-by-play
24	Domingo Germán (NYY); RHP, 30; 99 pitches, 9 K	June 28, 2023	New York Yankees, 11 at Oakland Athletics, 0; Venue: Oakland Coliseum, night game; Attendance: 12,479; Time: 2:30; Caught by: Kyle Higashioka; Umpires: HP: Edwin Moscoso; 1B: Nate Tomlinson; 2B: Jordan Baker; 3B: Chris Guccione; Box score and play-by-play

==== Cy Young ====
Young's perfect game was part of a hitless streak of 24 or 25 1/3 straight innings—depending on whether partial innings at either end of the streak are included. In either calculation, the streak remains a record. It was also part of a streak of 45 straight innings in which Young did not give up a run, which was then a record.

==== Addie Joss ====
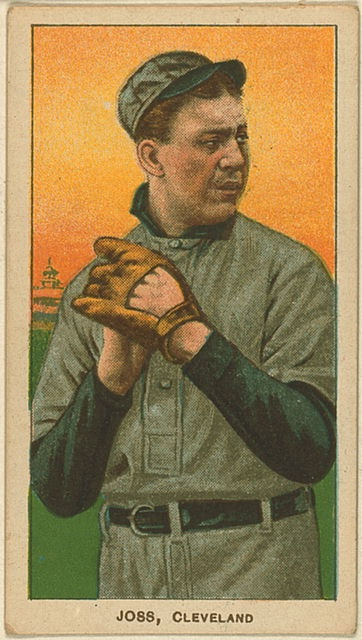
Of the 21 perfect games for which pitch counts are available, Addie Joss's was the most efficient–74 pitches, fewer than three per batter.

Joss's was the most pressure-packed of any regular-season perfect game. With just four games left on their schedule, the Cleveland Naps were involved in a three-way pennant race with the Tigers and the White Sox, that day's opponents. Joss's counterpart, Ed Walsh, struck out 15 and gave up just four scattered singles. The lone, unearned run scored as a result of a botched pickoff play and a wild pitch. The Naps ended the day tied with the Tigers for first, with the White Sox two games back; the Tigers won the league by a half game over the Naps. Joss threw a second no-hitter against the White Sox in 1910, making him, Tim Lincecum and Justin Verlander the only major league pitchers to throw two no-hitters against the same team.

==== Charlie Robertson ====
Robertson's perfect game was only his fifth appearance, and fourth start, in the big leagues. He finished his career with a 49–80 record, the fewest wins of any perfect-game pitcher until Dallas Braden; Robertson's winning percentage of .380 remains the lowest of anyone who threw a perfect game. The Tigers, led by player-manager Ty Cobb, accused Robertson of illegally doctoring the ball with oil or grease. In terms of the opposing team's ability to get on base, this is statistically the most unlikely: the 1922 Tigers had a stellar on-base percentage (OBP) of .373.

==== Don Larsen ====
Larsen did not know he would pitch in Game 5 of the 1956 World Series until a few hours before game time. This was his second start of the Series; he had lasted less than two innings in Game 2. In his perfect game, Larsen employed the style he had adopted in mid-season, working without a windup. Just one Dodgers batter—Pee Wee Reese, in the first inning—worked a three-ball count. The Dodgers had the highest season winning percentage of any team to lose a perfect game: .604. The image of catcher Yogi Berra leaping into Larsen's arms after the final strike is one of the most famous in baseball history. The 34 years between Robertson's feat and Larsen's is the longest gap between perfect games.

==== Jim Bunning ====
Bunning's perfect game, pitched on Father's Day, was the first in the National League since Ward's 84 years before. Defying the baseball superstition that holds one should not talk about a no-hitter in progress, Bunning spoke to his teammates about the perfect game as it developed to loosen them up and relieve the pressure.

==== Sandy Koufax ====
Sandy Koufax's perfect game was the last of his four no-hitters, pitched in four consecutive seasons.

Koufax's perfect game was the first one pitched at night. It was nearly a double no-hitter, as Cubs pitcher Bob Hendley gave up only one hit, a bloop double to left fielder Lou Johnson in the seventh inning that did not figure in the scoring. The Dodgers scored their only run in the fifth inning: Lou Johnson reached first on a walk, advanced to second on a sacrifice bunt, stole third, and scored when Cubs catcher Chris Krug overthrew third base on the play. The game also set records for the fewest hits by both teams, one, and the fewest base runners by both teams, two (both Johnson). Koufax's 14 strikeouts are tied with Matt Cain for the most thrown by a perfect game pitcher.

==== Catfish Hunter ====
Hunter, a talented batter, was also the hitting star of his perfect game. He went 3 for 4 with a double and 3 RBIs, including a bunt single that drove home the first and thus winning run in the seventh inning—easily the best offensive performance by a perfect game pitcher. At 22 years and 30 days old, Hunter was the youngest pitcher to throw a perfect game in the modern era. This was the first no-hitter of the Athletics' Oakland tenure, which was only 25 games old.

==== Len Barker ====
Barker's perfect game was the first one in which designated hitters were used. He did not reach a three-ball count in the entire game. Toronto shortstop Alfredo Griffin, who played for the losing team in this game, went on to play for the losers in the perfect games of Browning and Martínez. Also on the losing end of this game was Danny Ainge, who played 14 seasons in the National Basketball Association. All 11 of Barker's strikeouts were swinging.

==== Mike Witt ====
Witt's perfect game came on the last day of the 1984 season. Reggie Jackson, who drove in the only run of the game on a seventh-inning fielder's choice ground ball, was also on the winning team in Catfish Hunter's perfect game. On April 11, 1990, Witt, pitching out of the bullpen, combined with starting pitcher Mark Langston to throw a no-hitter for the California Angels.

==== Tom Browning ====
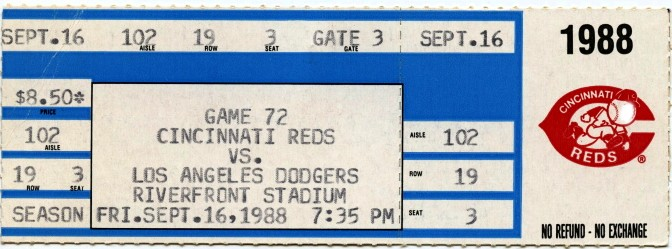
A ticket from Browning's perfect game.

Browning's perfect game, for the Cincinnati Reds against the Los Angeles Dodgers in September 1988, came against the team that eventually won that year's World Series, one of only four times that has happened. A two-hour, twenty-seven-minute rain delay caused the game to start at approximately 10 p.m. Right fielder Paul O'Neill, who played for the winning side in this game, also played for the winning side in the perfect games of Wells and Cone. The following July 4, Browning came within an inning of becoming the first pitcher to throw two perfect games, retiring the first 24 batters in a game against the Phillies before surrendering a leadoff double in the ninth.

==== Dennis Martínez ====
Martínez, born in Granada, Nicaragua, was the first major league pitcher born outside of the United States to throw a perfect game. He achieved the feat for the Montreal Expos against the Los Angeles Dodgers in July 1991. Opposing pitcher Mike Morgan was perfect through five full innings, the latest the opposing starter in a perfect game has remained perfect. Two days earlier, Expos pitcher Mark Gardner no-hit the Dodgers through nine innings but lost the no-hitter in the tenth, meaning the Expos narrowly missed throwing a no-hitter and a perfect game in the same series. Martínez's catcher, Ron Hassey, had also caught Len Barker's perfect game. This was the third perfect game pitched against the Brooklyn/Los Angeles Dodgers, joining those of Larsen and Browning; the only other teams to lose more than one perfect game are the Twins (Hunter and Wells), the Rays (Buehrle, Hernandez, and Braden) and the Athletics (Young and German).

==== Kenny Rogers ====
Rogers benefited from center fielder Rusty Greer's diving catch of a line drive by Rex Hudler, who led off the ninth inning. Rogers' performance against the Angels came 10 seasons after Witt's perfect game against the Rangers. The Angels and Rangers are the only major league teams to record perfect games against each other. The home plate umpire was a minor league fill-in, Ed Bean, who was working his 29th Major League game and seventh behind the plate. At the time, Bean was substituting for 17-year veteran Ken Kaiser and worked only seven more MLB games following Rogers' performance.

==== David Wells ====
Wells attended the same high school as Don Larsen: Point Loma High School, San Diego, California. They also both enjoyed the night life. Casey Stengel once said of Larsen, "The only thing he fears is sleep." Wells has claimed to have been "half-drunk" and suffering from a "raging, skull-rattling hangover" during his perfect game. Wells' perfect game comprised the core of a streak of 38 consecutive retired batters (May 12–23, 1998), an American League record he held until 2007.

==== David Cone ====
Cone's perfect game occurred on Yogi Berra Day. Don Larsen threw out the ceremonial first pitch to Berra, who had been his catcher during the 1956 World Series perfect game. Larsen was the only perfect game pitcher to attend another perfect game, until Cone and fellow pitcher Dallas Braden were in Oakland for Domingo German’s perfect game in 2023 as TV analysts for the New York Yankees and Oakland Athletics respectively. No Expo worked even a three-ball count. Cone's perfect game, which took only 88 pitches, was interrupted by a 33-minute rain delay and is the only one to date in regular-season interleague play, and the only other interleague perfect game besides Larsen's. Following teammate Wells's perfect game the previous season, this also represents the only time two successive perfect games have been thrown by the same team.

==== Randy Johnson ====
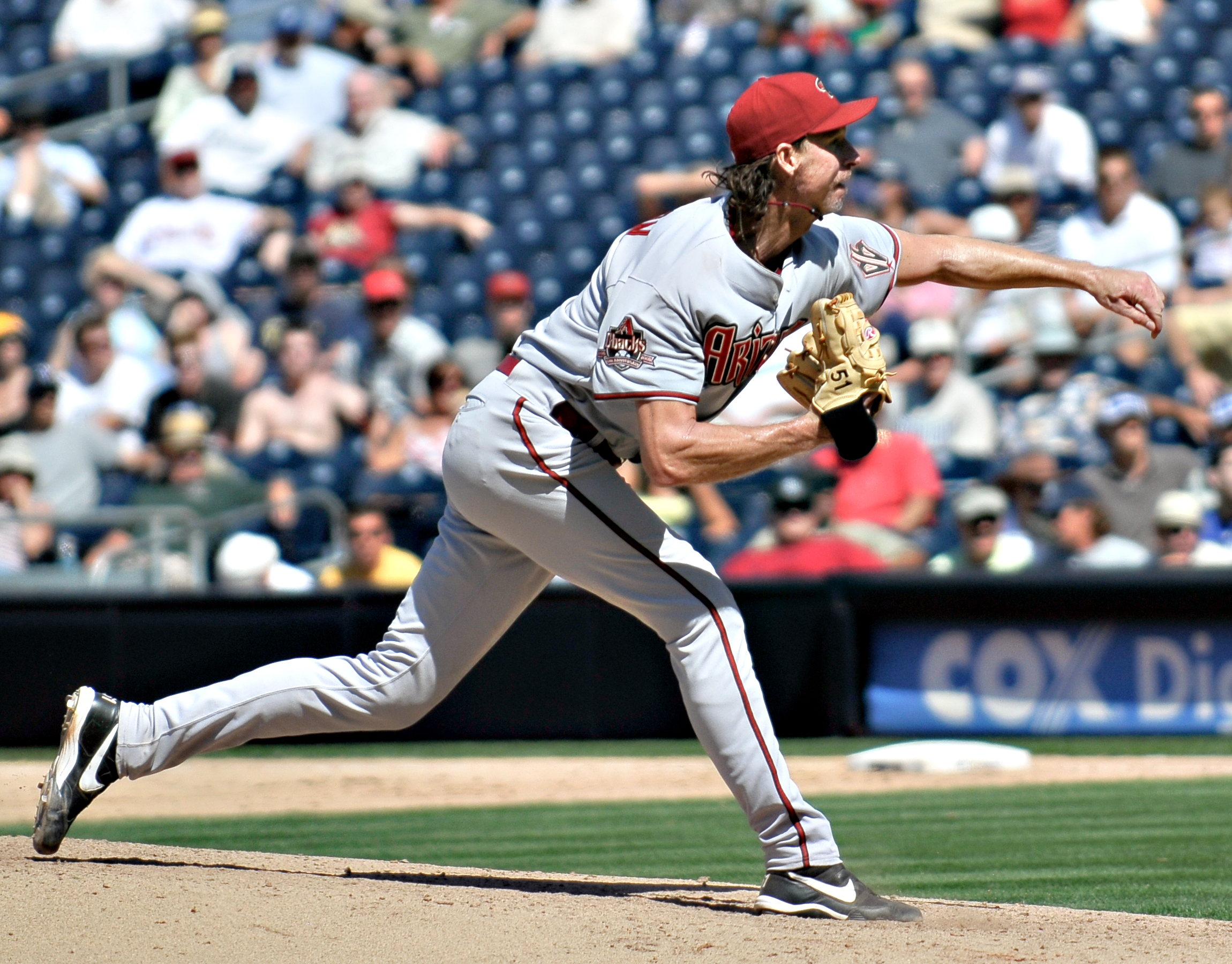
In 2004, Randy Johnson, then with the Arizona Diamondbacks, became the oldest pitcher to throw a perfect game.

Johnson threw his perfect game at the age of 40 years, 251 days, becoming the oldest pitcher to do so by 3 1/2 years, surpassing Cy Young, who threw his at 37 years, 37 days. Johnson is also the tallest perfect game pitcher at 6' 10", surpassing Mike Witt by three inches. Of the teams to have a perfect game thrown against them, the 2004 Braves have the second-highest OBP (.343) and are tied for the second-highest winning percentage (.593). In contrast, the Diamondbacks had by far the worst season winning percentage (.315) of any team to benefit from a perfect game.

==== Mark Buehrle ====
On Thursday, July 23, 2009, Mark Buehrle of the Chicago White Sox pitched a perfect game against the Tampa Bay Rays. Buehrle was assisted by a ninth-inning wall-climbing catch by center fielder DeWayne Wise to rob Gabe Kapler of a home run; Wise had just entered the game as a defensive replacement before Kapler's at-bat. This was the first major league perfect game in which the pitcher and catcher were battery-mates for the first time; Ramón Castro had been acquired by the White Sox less than two months before. This was also the first perfect game to feature a grand slam, by Josh Fields in the bottom of the second inning. Umpire Eric Cooper, who called the game, had been behind the plate for Buehrle's previous no-hitter. On July 28, Buehrle followed up with another 5 2/3 perfect innings to set the major league record for consecutive batters retired at 45 (this includes the final batter he faced in his appearance before the perfect game). That record was broken by Yusmeiro Petit of the San Francisco Giants in 2014.

==== Dallas Braden ====
Braden's perfect game, pitched on Mother's Day, was the first complete game of his career. His grandmother attended the game and celebrated on the field with him. It was the first time a perfect game had been pitched against the team with the best record in the majors at the time; coming into the contest, the Rays were 22–8. The 2010 Rays are tied for the second-highest winning percentage (.593) of any team to be on the receiving end of a perfect game. MLB's previous perfect game had also been thrown against the Rays, making them the second team to have successive perfect games against them (the first was the Dodgers in 1988 and 1991). This game came 290 days after Buehrle's, the shortest period between modern-day perfect games—a record which lasted just three weeks, until Halladay's perfect game.

==== Roy Halladay ====
Halladay, of the Philadelphia Phillies, pitched a perfect game on May 29, 2010, against the Florida Marlins, the second perfect game of the 2010 season and 20 days after Braden's, the shortest period between perfect games in the modern era. Mark Buehrle's perfect game had been 10 months earlier, marking the first time that three perfect games occurred within a one-year span. Seven batters reached three-ball counts against Halladay. Halladay nearly pitched a second perfect game in the 2010 NL Division Series against the Reds but gave up a walk to Jay Bruce, making it a no-hitter; he became the only perfect game pitcher to throw another no-hitter in the same season, and the fifth with two no-hitters. Halladay was the second pitcher to throw a perfect game and win the Cy Young Award in the same season; Sandy Koufax did so in 1965.

==== Philip Humber ====
On April 21, 2012, Philip Humber of the Chicago White Sox pitched the third perfect game in White Sox history. The final out of Humber's perfect game came after a full-count check-swing third strike to Brendan Ryan on a ball that catcher A. J. Pierzynski dropped. As Ryan disputed umpire Brian Runge's decision that he had swung, Pierzynski threw the ball to first base for the final out. As with Braden, Humber's perfect game was the first complete game of his career. Unlike Braden, the perfect game was the only complete game of Humber's career. Humber's lifetime major league record of 16-23 gives him the fewest career wins of any pitcher who has thrown an MLB perfect game. The White Sox became the second franchise with three perfect games, joining the Yankees.

==== Matt Cain ====
On June 13, 2012, Matt Cain of the San Francisco Giants pitched the first perfect game in Giants franchise history, the second of three in 2012, and the 22nd in MLB history. Third baseman Joaquín Árias threw out Jason Castro for the final out on a chopped grounder he fielded deep behind the bag. Cain tallied 14 strikeouts, tying Sandy Koufax for the most strikeouts in a perfect game. Cain's 125 pitches are the most thrown in a perfect game. Cain was aided by a running catch at the wall by Melky Cabrera in the 6th and a diving catch by Gregor Blanco in the 7th. The winning Giants scored 10 runs, making this the highest-scoring perfect game until the record was broken in 2023. Home plate umpire Ted Barrett had also called Cone's perfect game, making him the only person to call two; having umpired at third base for Humber's game, Barrett also became just the second man, after Alfredo Griffin, to have been on the field for three perfect games—within two months; since then, there have been four more.

==== Félix Hernández ====
On August 15, 2012, Félix Hernández of the Seattle Mariners threw the 23rd perfect game in MLB history (and the first in August) against the Tampa Bay Rays. This was the first perfect game in Mariners history, and the franchise's fourth no-hitter; it also made 2012 the first and to date only MLB season in which three perfect games were recorded. Hernandez's performance was highlighted by 12 strikeouts and a career-high 26 swinging-strikes. In an on-field interview immediately following the last out, Hernandez said he had started thinking about the possibility of a perfect game in the second inning. It was the third time in the past four seasons that Tampa Bay was on the losing side of a perfect game. Four Rays—Evan Longoria, Carlos Peña, B.J. Upton, and Ben Zobrist—joined Alfredo Griffin in having played in three perfect games for the losing team; all four also participated in Buehrle's and Braden's.

==== Domingo Germán ====
On June 28, 2023, Domingo Germán of the New York Yankees pitched the 24th perfect game in MLB history against the Oakland Athletics. It was the fourth perfect game by a Yankee and the 13th no-hitter in franchise history. As the Yankees scored 11 runs, this set a new record for the highest scoring perfect game. Germán became the first Dominican-born player to throw a perfect game.

=== General notes ===
- Three perfect-game pitchers had RBIs in their games: Hunter (3), Bunning (2), and Young (1).
- Six perfect-game pitchers recorded hits during their games: Hunter had three hits; Richmond, Ward, Bunning, Martínez, and Cain each had one.
- Cain is the only pitcher to score a run during a perfect game (Gregor Blanco followed him in the order and hit a home run).
- Barker, Witt, Rogers, Wells, Cone, Buehrle, Braden, Humber, Hernández and Germán did not bat in their perfect games, as the American League adopted the designated hitter rule in 1973.
- The latest the winning run has been scored in a perfect game is the seventh inning—this occurred in the games of Hunter (bottom), Witt (top), and Martínez (top).
- Seven perfect-game pitchers have also thrown at least one additional no-hitter: Young, Joss, Bunning, Koufax, Johnson, Buehrle, and Halladay. Witt participated in a combined no-hitter. Koufax has the most total no-hitters of any perfect-game pitcher, with four.
- Richmond and Robertson were rookies, though each had made a single appearance in a previous season.
- Although by the latter part of the twentieth century, major league games were being played predominantly at night, six of the last ten perfect games, and four of the last six, have taken place in the daytime.
- Since 1973, nine perfect games have been thrown with the DH rule in effect (including one interleague game held at an American League park) and only five without it.

== Perfect games by team ==
Of the 30 franchises that currently make up Major League Baseball, seven have never been involved in a perfect game, win or loss, as of the 2026 season. This includes three of the "Original 16" franchises (the Cardinals, Pirates, and Orioles) and four of the 14 teams that joined MLB in the expansion era (the Royals, Brewers, Padres, and Rockies).

=== Current teams ===
Franchise	Perfect games pitched	Perfect games pitched against
New York Yankees	4	0
Chicago White Sox	3	1
Athletics	2	2
Cleveland Guardians	2	0
Philadelphia Phillies	2	0
Arizona Diamondbacks	1	0
Boston Red Sox	1	0
Cincinnati Reds	1	0
Los Angeles Angels	1	1
Los Angeles Dodgers	1	3
San Francisco Giants	1	0
Seattle Mariners	1	1
Texas Rangers	1	1
Washington Nationals	1	1
Atlanta Braves	0	1
Baltimore Orioles	0	0
Chicago Cubs	0	1
Colorado Rockies	0	0
Detroit Tigers	0	1
Houston Astros	0	1
Kansas City Royals	0	0
Miami Marlins	0	1
Milwaukee Brewers	0	0
Minnesota Twins	0	2
New York Mets	0	1
Pittsburgh Pirates	0	0
San Diego Padres	0	0
St. Louis Cardinals	0	0
Tampa Bay Rays	0	3
Toronto Blue Jays	0	1

=== Defunct teams ===
Franchise	Perfect games pitched	Perfect games pitched against
Providence Grays	1	0
Worcester Worcesters	1	0
Buffalo Bisons	0	1
Cleveland Blues	0	1

== Unofficial perfect games ==
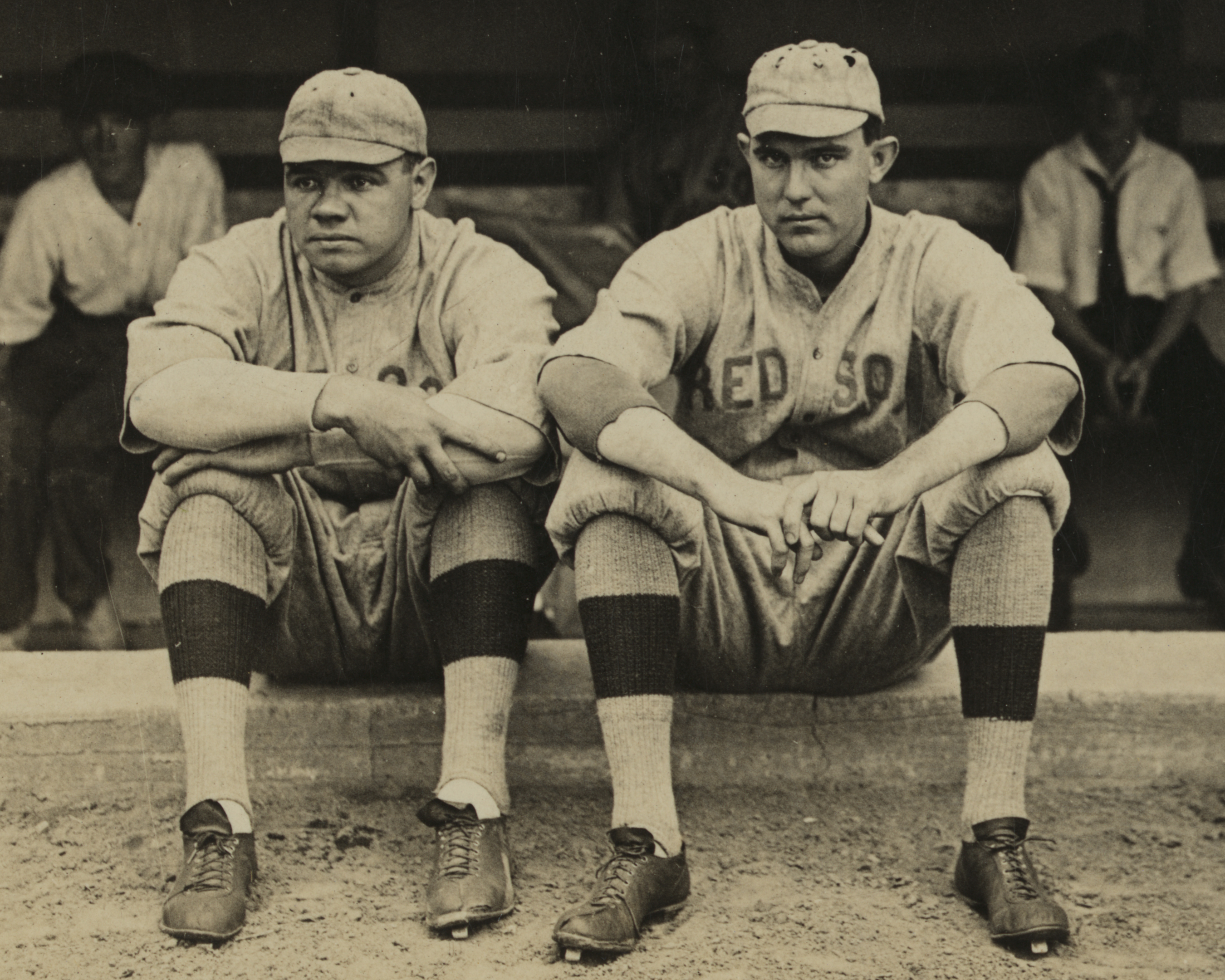
Boston Red Sox pitchers Babe Ruth and Ernie Shore. In a 1917 game, Ruth was ejected after walking the first batter. Shore replaced him, erased the baserunner, and completed the game without allowing another.

There has been one instance in which a major league pitcher retired every player he faced over nine innings without allowing a baserunner, but, by the current definition, is not credited with a perfect game because there was already a baserunner when he took the mound.

On June 23, 1917, Babe Ruth, then a pitcher with the Boston Red Sox, walked the Washington Senators' first batter, Ray Morgan, on four straight pitches. Ruth, who had already been shouting at umpire Brick Owens about the quality of his calls, became even angrier and, in short order, was ejected. Enraged, Ruth charged Owens, swung at him, and had to be led off the field by a policeman. Ernie Shore came in to replace Ruth, while catcher Sam Agnew took over behind the plate for Pinch Thomas. Morgan was caught stealing by Agnew on the first pitch by Shore, who proceeded to retire the next 26 batters. All 27 outs were made while Shore was on the mound. Once recognized as a perfect game by Major League Baseball, this still counts as a combined no-hitter.

=== Perfect in Regulation ===
There have been two instances of perfect in regulation perfect games where a pitcher was perfect through nine innings of regulation play, but the game went into extra innings and an opposing player eventually reached base. Since 2020, if a game goes into extra innings, the international tiebreaker rule denotes a runner is automatically inserted on second base starting in the 10th inning.

- On May 26, 1959, Harvey Haddix of the Pittsburgh Pirates pitched what is often referred to as the greatest pitching performance in baseball history. Haddix carried a perfect game through 12 innings against the Milwaukee Braves, only to have it ruined when an error by third baseman Don Hoak allowed Félix Mantilla, the leadoff batter in the bottom of the 13th inning, to reach base. A sacrifice by Eddie Mathews and an intentional walk to Hank Aaron followed; the next batter, Joe Adcock, hit a home run that became a double when he passed Aaron on the bases. Haddix and the Pirates had lost the game 1–0; despite their 12 hits in the game, they could not bring a run home. The 12 perfect innings–36 consecutive batters retired in a single game—remains a record.
- On June 3, 1995, Pedro Martínez of the Montreal Expos had a perfect game through nine innings against the San Diego Padres. The Expos scored a run in the top of the tenth inning, but in the bottom, Martínez gave up a leadoff double to Bip Roberts, and was relieved by Mel Rojas, who retired the next three batters. Martínez was therefore the winning pitcher in a 1–0 Expos victory.

Four other games in which one team failed to reach base are not official perfect games because they were called off before nine innings were played:

=== Shortened Games ===
Three perfect games were shortened early.

- On August 11, 1907, Ed Karger of the St. Louis Cardinals pitched seven perfect innings against the Boston Braves in the second game of doubleheader which was called by prior agreement.
- On October 5, 1907, Rube Vickers of the Philadelphia Athletics pitched five perfect innings against the Senators in the second game of doubleheader called on account of darkness. Vickers achieved his feat on the last day of the season. He also pitched the final 12 innings of the 15-inning first game. His back-to-back victories were his only wins of the year.
- On August 6, 1967, Dean Chance of the Minnesota Twins pitched five perfect innings against the Red Sox in a game called on account of rain.
- On April 21, 1984, David Palmer of the Expos pitched five perfect innings against the Cardinals in the second game of doubleheader, which was called on account of rain.

== Perfect games spoiled by the 27th batter ==
On thirteen occasions in Major League Baseball history, a perfect game has been spoiled when a batter reached base with two outs in the ninth inning. Unless otherwise noted, the pitcher in question finished and won the game without allowing any more baserunners. Note that before the American League and National League implemented the designated hitter rule in 1973 and 2022 respectively, the pitcher was usually scheduled to bat in the spot and the 27th batter was usually a pinch-hitter as a result, which was the case in six of the seven perfect games spoiled on the 27th batter without the rule in play.

- On July 4, 1908, Hooks Wiltse of the New York Giants hit Philadelphia Phillies pitcher George McQuillan on a 2–2 count in a scoreless game—the only time a 0–0 perfect game has been broken up by the 27th batter and the only time a perfect game has been spoiled on the 27th batter by the opposing pitcher. Umpire Cy Rigler later admitted that he should have called the previous pitch strike 3. Wiltse pitched on, winning 1–0; his ten-inning no-hitter set a record for longest complete game no-hitter that has been tied twice but never broken.
- On August 5, 1932, Tommy Bridges of the Detroit Tigers gave up a pinch-hit single to the Washington Senators' Dave Harris.
- On June 27, 1958, Billy Pierce of the Chicago White Sox gave up a double, which landed just inches in fair territory, on his first pitch to Washington Senators pinch hitter Ed Fitz Gerald.
- On September 2, 1972, Milt Pappas of the Chicago Cubs walked San Diego Padres pinch hitter Larry Stahl on a borderline 3–2 pitch. Pappas finished with a no-hitter. The umpire, Bruce Froemming, was in his second year; he went on to a 37-year career in which he umpired a record 11 no-hitters. Pappas believed he had struck out Stahl, and years later continued to bear ill will toward Froemming.
- On April 15, 1983, Milt Wilcox of the Detroit Tigers gave up a pinch-hit single to the Chicago White Sox' Jerry Hairston Sr.
- On May 2, 1988, Ron Robinson of the Cincinnati Reds gave up a two-strike pinch-hit single to the Montreal Expos' Wallace Johnson. Robinson then allowed a two-run homer to Tim Raines and was removed from the game. The final score was 3–2, with Robinson the winner. (Robinson's teammate Tom Browning threw his perfect game later that season.)
- On August 4, 1989, Dave Stieb of the Toronto Blue Jays gave up a double to the New York Yankees' Roberto Kelly, followed by an RBI single by Steve Sax. Stieb finished with a 2–1 victory. This was the third time Stieb had a no-hitter broken up with two outs in the ninth inning.
- On April 20, 1990, Brian Holman of the Seattle Mariners gave up a home run to Ken Phelps of the Oakland Athletics.
- On September 2, 2001, Mike Mussina of the New York Yankees gave up a two-strike single to Boston Red Sox pinch hitter Carl Everett. The opposing pitcher in the game was David Cone, who had thrown the most recent perfect game two years earlier as a Yankee.
- Armando Galarraga's near-perfect game: On June 2, 2010, Armando Galarraga of the Detroit Tigers was charged with a single when first-base umpire Jim Joyce incorrectly ruled Jason Donald of the Cleveland Indians safe on an infield grounder. After the game, Joyce acknowledged his mistake: "I just cost that kid a perfect game. I thought he beat the throw. I was convinced he beat the throw, until I saw the replay." Tyler Kepner of The New York Times wrote that no call had been "so important and so horribly botched" since the 1985 World Series. Galarraga retired the next batter as Donald advanced to third base via defensive indifference. Having taken place just four days after Halladay's perfect game, it would have set a new record for the closest to another perfect game, as well as the third perfect game in a 25-day span. Donald was awarded first base on Galarraga's 83rd pitch, which would have made it the second most efficient perfect game on record. Many fans and analysts have subsequently called for MLB to retroactively correct Joyce's call and officially award Galarraga with a perfect game, but no such action has been taken by the league.
- On April 2, 2013, Yu Darvish of the Texas Rangers gave up a first pitch single to Marwin González of the Houston Astros on a ground ball between Darvish's legs and through the middle infield with two outs in the ninth inning. Darvish was removed from the game without facing another batter, having thrown 111 pitches. With 14 strikeouts through the first 26 batters, Darvish had a chance to tie (or exceed, had he struck out González) a record for a perfect game. The Rangers won the game, 7–0.
- On September 6, 2013, Yusmeiro Petit of the San Francisco Giants retired the first 26 Arizona Diamondbacks batters before giving up a single to pinch hitter Eric Chavez on a 3–2 pitch. Giants right fielder Hunter Pence dove for the ball but came up just a couple of inches short. Petit retired the next batter to finish the one-hit shutout. The next season, over a period of eight games, Petit set the major league record for most consecutive batters retired, at 46.
- On June 20, 2015, Max Scherzer of the Washington Nationals retired the first 26 Pittsburgh Pirates batters before hitting pinch-hitter José Tábata with a pitch on a 2–2 count. It has been argued that Tábata intentionally leaned into the pitch—by rule, if "the batter makes no attempt to avoid being touched by the ball", let alone attempts to be hit by it, he is not entitled to first base. If the umpires had so ruled, the at-bat would have continued with a full count. Scherzer retired the following batter to complete the no-hitter, joining Wiltse and Pappas as only the third pitcher to do so after being denied a perfect game with two outs in the ninth.

== Other notable near-perfect games ==
=== Nine or more consecutive innings of perfection ===
There have been fifteen occasions in Major League Baseball history when a pitcher—or, in one case, multiple pitchers—recorded at least 27 consecutive outs after one or more runners reached base. In four instances, the game went into extra innings and the pitcher(s) recorded more than 27 consecutive outs:

- On May 11, 1919, Walter Johnson, pitching for the Senators against the Yankees, retired 28 batters in a row: After surrendering a one-out single in the first to Roger Peckinpaugh and then retiring the next two batters to end the inning, he was perfect in the second through the ninth. He recorded two outs in the tenth, before giving up a walk to Home Run Baker. The first Sunday game to be played legally in New York, it was ended after the 12th inning, still scoreless, because Yankee owner Jacob Ruppert mistakenly believed the new law barred play after 6 p.m.
- On September 24, 1919, Waite Hoyt, pitching for the Red Sox against the Yankees in the second game of a doubleheader, gave up a run in the second inning. The Red Sox tied the game in the ninth on a solo home run by Babe Ruth, his then record-breaking 28th of the season. The game report in the New York Times states, "Hoyt gave a remarkable performance of his pitching skill, and from the fourth inning to the thirteenth he did not allow a hit and not a Yankee runner reached first base. In these nine hitless innings the youngster was at the top of his form". The Yankees eventually won 2–1 when, in the 13th, Wally Pipp tripled and was brought home by a sacrifice fly. (The New York Times report states that Pipp tripled with "two out"—evidently a typographical or counting error, as the subsequent sacrifice fly, which is described in detail, would not then have been possible.) Play-by-play records are not currently available for the game, but it appears that Hoyt recorded no less than 28 consecutive outs—the last out in the third inning and 27 in the perfect nine innings encompassing the fourth through the 12th.
- On September 18, 1971, Rick Wise, pitching for the Phillies against the Cubs, gave up a home run to the leadoff batter in the second inning, Frank Fernández. He did not allow another baserunner until Ron Santo singled with two outs in the top of the 12th. Wise retired the next batter and the Phillies scored in the bottom of the inning, making him the winner, 4–3. Wise had been perfect for 10 2/3, retiring 32 consecutive batters—the record for most consecutive outs in a game by a winning pitcher. At the plate, Wise helped his cause by going 3 for 6, with a double and the game-winning RBI in the bottom of the 12th. The starting pitcher for the Cubs was Milt Pappas, who had his near-perfect game one year later.
- On July 6, 2005, A. J. Burnett, then pitching for the Florida Marlins, surrendered a two-out single in the third inning that gave the Milwaukee Brewers a 4–1 lead. It was the fourth hit he had given up, on top of five walks. He then retired the next ten batters before leaving the game with the Marlins trailing 4–2. In his six innings, he struck out 14. Jim Mecir pitched a perfect seventh and Guillermo Mota pitched a perfect eighth and ninth as the Marlins rallied to send the game into extra innings. Todd Jones was perfect in the 10th and 11th and Valerio de los Santos picked up the win with a perfect 12th, for a total of 28 straight batters retired starting with the final batter of the third inning.

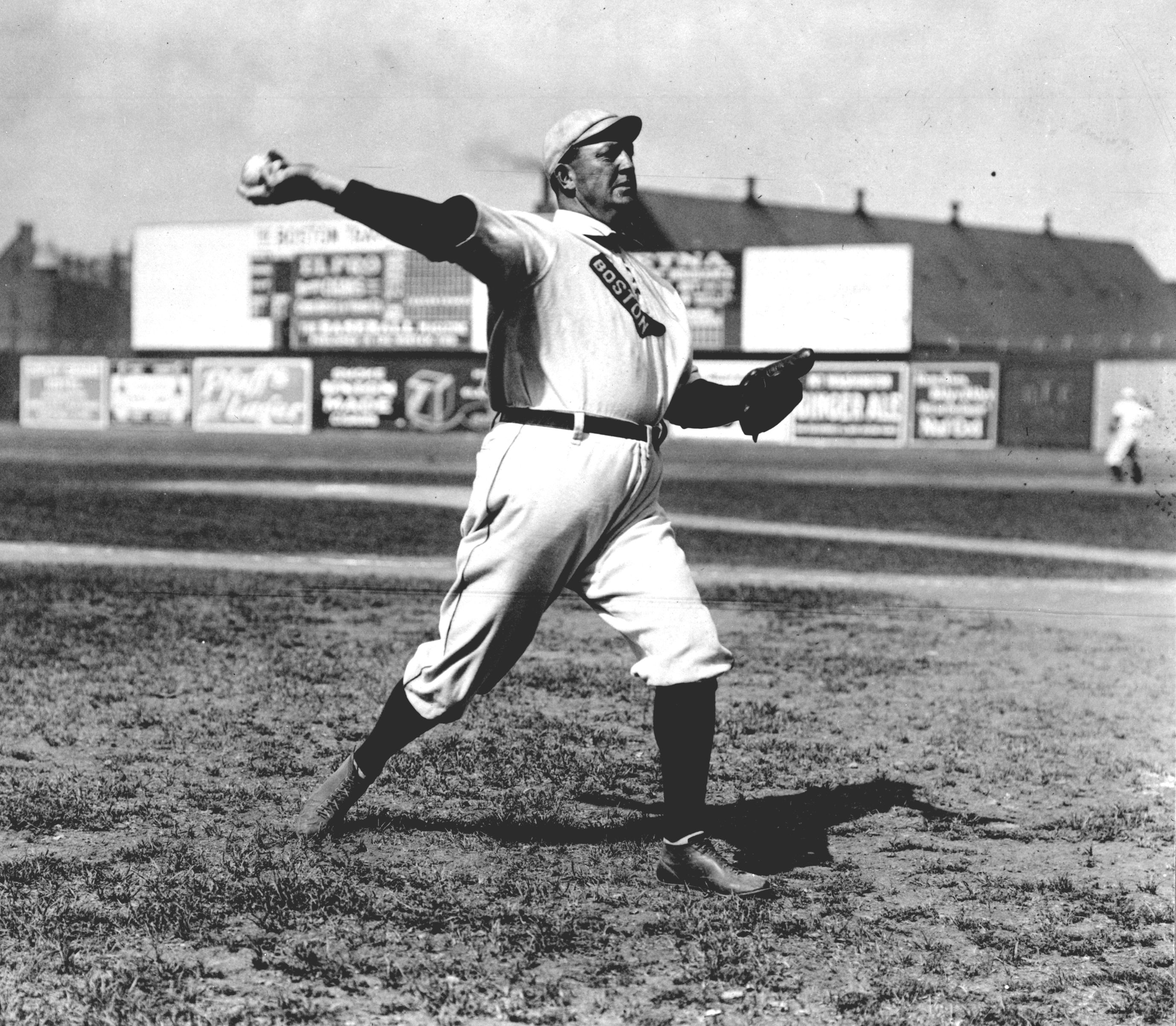
Cy Young, first perfect game pitcher of the modern era. His 1908 no-hitter was a solo version of the Ruth–Shore game of 1917: a leadoff walk, a caught stealing, and perfection the rest of the way.

In the eleven other instances, the leadoff batter (or batters) reached base in the first inning, followed by 27 consecutive batters (or batters and baserunners) being retired through the end of a nine-inning game. In two cases, the leadoff baserunner was retired, meaning the pitcher faced the minimum:

- On June 30, 1908, Red Sox pitcher Cy Young walked the New York Highlanders' leadoff batter, Harry Niles, who was caught stealing. No one else reached base against Young, who also had three hits and four RBIs in Boston's 8–0 win. It was the third no-hitter of Young's career and about as close as possible to being his second perfect game. He is the only pitcher in major league history to retire 27 consecutive men in a game on two occasions.
- On June 23, 1917, Ernie Shore of the Red Sox was on the mound when Ray Morgan, the leadoff batter, who had been walked by Babe Ruth, the previously ejected pitcher, was picked off. Shore retired the next 26 batters in succession (see "Unofficial perfect games" above).

The remaining instances in which a pitcher recorded 27 consecutive outs in a game, noting how the opponent's leadoff batter (or batters) reached base:

- May 24, 1884, Al Atkinson/Philadelphia Athletics (Pittsburgh Alleghenys' Ed Swartwood hit by pitch, stole second, reached third on a groundout, and scored on a passed ball)
- August 26, 1916, Bullet Joe Bush/Philadelphia Athletics (Cleveland Indians' Jack Graney walked. Bush finished with a no-hitter.)
- May 16, 1953, Curt Simmons/Philadelphia Phillies (single by Milwaukee Braves' Bill Bruton)
- May 13, 1954, Robin Roberts/Phillies (home run by Reds' Bobby Adams)
- July 1, 1966, Woodie Fryman/Pittsburgh Pirates (single by New York Mets' Ron Hunt)
- May 19, 1981, Jim Bibby/Pirates (single by Atlanta Braves' Terry Harper)
- June 11, 1982, Jerry Reuss/Los Angeles Dodgers (double by Reds' Eddie Milner, who reached third on a sacrifice bunt and scored on a fielder's choice)
- April 22, 1993, Chris Bosio/Seattle Mariners (walks by Red Sox Ernest Riles and Carlos Quintana, the latter of whom was retired on a double play)
- July 7, 2006, John Lackey/Los Angeles Angels (double by Oakland Athletics' Mark Kotsay)
- May 10, 2013, Shelby Miller/St. Louis Cardinals (single by Colorado Rockies' Eric Young, Jr.)

=== No-hit, no-walk, no-hit batsman games ===
In Major League Baseball play since 1893, with the essential modern rules in place, there have been twelve instances when a pitcher allowed not a single baserunner through his pitching efforts over a complete game of at least nine innings, but was not awarded a perfect game because of one or more fielding errors, or a dropped third strike:

- On June 13, 1905, Christy Mathewson of the New York Giants pitched masterfully, but two Cubs nonetheless reached base on errors by shortstop Bill Dahlen and second baseman Billy Gilbert. In a classic pitching duel, the Cubs' Mordecai "Three Finger" Brown also carried a no-hitter into the ninth, losing it and the game, 1–0.
- On September 5, 1908, the Brooklyn Dodgers' Nap Rucker shut out the Boston Doves despite three errors that allowed three Doves to reach base. In more than a century since, no otherwise perfect game has been spoiled by multiple errors.
- On July 1, 1920, an error by Senators second baseman Bucky Harris was the lone defect in a game dominated by Walter Johnson's no-hit, no-walk, no-hit batsman effort. Harry Hooper, the Red Sox who reached base, was batting leadoff in the seventh.
- On September 3, 1947, with one out in the second, Stan Spence of the Senators hit a routine ground ball which Philadelphia Athletics first baseman Ferris Fain threw wildly to pitcher Bill McCahan, who was covering first base. Spence made it to second on the error, and turned out to be the only baserunner for the Senators.
- On July 19, 1974, flawless through 3 2/3 innings, Cleveland Indians pitcher Dick Bosman, handling a grounder off the bat of Oakland Athletic Sal Bando, threw over the first baseman's head. Not one other Athletic reached base, making this the only occasion in major league history when the sole demerit on an otherwise perfect defensive line was the pitcher's own fielding error.
- On June 27, 1980, Jerry Reuss of the Los Angeles Dodgers pitched a virtually immaculate game, but without hope of perfection—a first-inning throwing error by shortstop Bill Russell allowed the San Francisco Giants' Jack Clark to reach base. Russell atoned for his gaffe with a sharp fielding play in the eighth inning.
- On August 15, 1990, Philadelphia Phillies pitcher Terry Mulholland lost his perfect-game bid in the seventh inning when the Giants' Rick Parker, batting leadoff, reached base on a throwing error by third baseman Charlie Hayes. Parker was retired when the next batter, Dave Anderson, grounded into a double play. Mulholland pitched flawlessly and faced the minimum 27 batters, but still did not qualify for a perfect game. Hayes redeemed himself for the fielding error by making a spectacular catch on a line drive in the ninth inning to seal Mulholland's no-hitter.
- On July 10, 2009, the Giants' Jonathan Sánchez pitched perfectly against the San Diego Padres through one out in the eighth inning. Third baseman Juan Uribe, who switched positions from second base to start the seventh inning, committed an error on a ground ball, his first chance at third, that allowed Chase Headley to reach first—the latest an error has resulted in the sole baserunner in an otherwise perfect game. Headley advanced to second on a wild pitch. It was the first complete game of Sánchez's career.
- On June 18, 2014, Clayton Kershaw of the Los Angeles Dodgers threw a no-hitter against the Colorado Rockies that was perfect save for shortstop Hanley Ramírez's throwing error with no outs in the seventh inning. Kershaw's 15 strikeouts were at that point the most in a no-hit, no-walk game and his game score of 102 was the highest in any no-hitter.
- On October 3, 2015, Max Scherzer of the Washington Nationals surpassed both of Kershaw's marks, setting the record for a no-hit, no-walk game by striking out 17 and achieving a game score of 104 against the New York Mets. Scherzer's no-hitter, his second of the year, was denied perfection by third baseman Yunel Escobar's sixth-inning throwing error, allowing Kevin Plawecki to reach base.
- On May 5, 2021, the Orioles' John Means struck out Sam Haggerty swinging in the third inning against the Seattle Mariners; however, Haggerty was able to reach first base on a wild pitch. Haggerty was thrown out attempting to steal second base during the following at-bat. Means retired all other batters and therefore faced the minimum twenty-seven batters in the game. This is the only time in MLB history an otherwise perfect game was spoiled solely by a dropped third strike.

No otherwise perfect game in major league history has been spoiled solely by interference or an outfield error.

=== Minimum batters faced ===
There also have been games in which one or more batters reached base, but the pitcher nonetheless faced the minimum 27 for a complete game. On July 7, 2007, Érik Bédard of the Baltimore Orioles gave up two singles to the Texas Rangers, but both base-runners were putout by double plays. On April 18, 2007, Mark Buehrle of the Chicago White Sox threw a no-hitter against the Texas Rangers. The lone base runner was Sammy Sosa who reached on a walk in the 5th inning. He was subsequently thrown out on a pickoff. On May 29, 2014 Josh Collmenter of the Arizona Diamondbacks gave up three hits in a game against the Cincinnati Reds, but all three baserunners were involved in double plays. On August 1, 2023, Framber Valdez of the Houston Astros threw a no-hitter against the Cleveland Guardians. He gave up only one baserunner, a walk to Oscar González, who was erased after Will Brennan hit into a double play. On June 12, 2026, Jacob Misiorowski of the Milwaukee Brewers threw a 'Maddux' against the Phillies, striking out 15 and allowing just a single hit. The game's only baserunner, Kyle Schwarber, was promptly wiped out by Bryce Harper hitting into a double play.

=== No-hitters with a single baserunner ===
There have been a handful of no hitters where only a single walk, error, or other method of reaching base without a hit has been the sole spoiler of a perfect game. Below is a list of each time this has happened since 1901.

No-hitter number	Date	Pitcher(s)	Team	Score	Opposing team	Innings pitched before allowing baserunner	Player who reached base	Method of reaching based	Notes
321	August 1, 2023	Framber Valdez	Houston Astros	2–0	Cleveland Guardians	4	Oscar González	Base on balls	First no-hitter by a left-handed Astros pitcher. González was retired on a double play, pitcher faced minimum.
314	September 11, 2021	Corbin Burnes (8 IP); Josh Hader (1 IP)	Milwaukee Brewers	3–0	Cleveland Indians	6	Myles Straw	Base on balls	
311	May 19, 2021	Corey Kluber	New York Yankees	2–0	Texas Rangers	2 1/3	Charlie Culberson	Base on balls	
308	May 5, 2021	John Means	Baltimore Orioles	6–0	Seattle Mariners	2 1/3	Sam Haggerty	Uncaught third strike	First and currently only no–hitter where a dropped third strike was the sole spoiler. Pitcher faced minimum, as Haggerty was caught stealing.
307	April 14, 2021	Carlos Rodón	Chicago White Sox	8–0	Cleveland Indians	8 1/3	Roberto Pérez	Hit by pitch	
306	April 9, 2021	Joe Musgrove	San Diego Padres	3–0	Texas Rangers	3 2/3	Joey Gallo	Hit by pitch	First no–hitter in Padres history
304	August 25, 2020	Lucas Giolito	Chicago White Sox	4–0	Pittsburgh Pirates	3	Erik Gonzalez	Base on balls	
303	September 1, 2019	Justin Verlander	Houston Astros	2–0	Toronto Blue Jays	0 1/3	Cavan Biggio	Base on balls	
301	July 12, 2019	Taylor Cole (2 IP); Félix Peña (7 IP)	Los Angeles Angels	13–0	Seattle Mariners	4 1/3	Omar Narvaez	Base on balls	
294	October 3, 2015	Max Scherzer	Washington Nationals	2–0	New York Mets	5	Kevin Plawecki	Throwing error	Highest game score in a no-hitter (104); Tied for most strikeouts in a no-hitter (17)
289	June 20, 2015	Max Scherzer	Washington Nationals	6–0	Pittsburgh Pirates	8 2/3	José Tábata	Hit by pitch	One strike from a perfect game It has been argued that Tábata intentionally leaned into the pitch
285	June 25, 2014	Tim Lincecum	San Francisco Giants	4–0	San Diego Padres	1 1/3	Chase Headley	Base on balls	
284	June 18, 2014	Clayton Kershaw	Los Angeles Dodgers	8–0	Colorado Rockies	6	Corey Dickerson	Throwing error	
280	July 2, 2013	Homer Bailey	Cincinnati Reds	3–0	San Francisco Giants	6	Gregor Blanco	Base on balls	
271	May 7, 2011	Justin Verlander	Detroit Tigers	9–0	Toronto Blue Jays	7 1/3	J.P. Arencibia	Base on balls	Pitcher faced minimum, as Arencibia was retired on a double play
269	October 6, 2010	Roy Halladay	Philadelphia Phillies	4–0	Cincinnati Reds	4 2/3	Jay Bruce	Base on balls	Game 1 of 2010 NLDS; Pitched perfect game earlier in season
268	July 26, 2010	Matt Garza	Tampa Bay Rays	5–0	Detroit Tigers	1 1/3	Brennan Boesch	Base on balls	Pitcher faced minimum, as Boesch was retired on a double play
262	July 10, 2009	Jonathan Sánchez	San Francisco Giants	8–0	San Diego Padres	7 1/3	Chase Headley	Throwing error	
257	April 18, 2007	Mark Buehrle	Chicago White Sox	6–0	Texas Rangers	4 1/3	Sammy Sosa	Base on balls	Pitcher faced minimum, as Sosa was picked off Would go on to pitch a perfect game in 2009
252	April 27, 2002	Derek Lowe	Boston Red Sox	10–0	Tampa Bay Devil Rays	2	Brent Abernathy	Base on balls	Rays would go on to fall victim to 3 perfect games and 1 no–hitter in the span of 2009–2012
243	June 10, 1997	Kevin Brown	Florida Marlins	9–0	San Francisco Giants	7 2/3	Marvin Benard	Hit by pitch	
239	July 14, 1995	Ramón Martínez	Los Angeles Dodgers	7–0	Florida Marlins	7 2/3	Tommy Gregg	Base on balls	
235	September 8, 1993	Darryl Kile	Houston Astros	7–1	New York Mets	3 1/3	Jeff McKnight	Base on balls	Runner would score on a wild pitch two batters later
223	August 15, 1990	Terry Mulholland	Philadelphia Phillies	6–0	San Francisco Giants	6	Rick Parker	Throwing error	Pitcher faced minimum, as Parker was retired on a double play
205	June 27, 1980	Jerry Reuss	Los Angeles Dodgers	8–0	San Francisco Giants	0 2/3	Jack Clark	Error	
198	September 29, 1976	John Montefusco	San Francisco Giants	9–0	Atlanta Braves	3	Jerry Royster	Base on balls	
190	July 19, 1974	Dick Bosman	Cleveland Indians	4–0	Oakland Athletics	3 2/3	Sal Bando	Throwing error	
189	June 19, 1974	Steve Busby	Kansas City Royals	2–0	Milwaukee Brewers	1	George Scott	Base on balls	
182	September 2, 1972	Milt Pappas	Chicago Cubs	8–0	San Diego Padres	8 2/3	Larry Stahl	Base on balls	One strike from a perfect game Pappas had argued that he threw a strike
179	June 23, 1971	Rick Wise	Philadelphia Phillies	4–0	Cincinnati Reds	5 1/3	Dave Concepcion	Base on balls	
177	September 21, 1970	Vida Blue	Oakland Athletics	6–0	Minnesota Twins	3 2/3	Harmon Killebrew	Base on balls	
157	September 16, 1965	Dave Morehead	Boston Red Sox	2–0	Cleveland Indians	1	Rocky Colavito	Base on balls	
153	June 4, 1964	Sandy Koufax	Los Angeles Dodgers	3–0	Philadelphia Phillies	3 2/3	Dick Allen	Base on balls	Pitcher faced minimum, as Allen was caught stealing Would go on to pitch a perfect game in 1965
148	August 26, 1962	Jack Kralick	Minnesota Twins	1–0	Kansas City Athletics	8 1/3	George Alusik	Base on balls	
147	August 1, 1962	Bill Monbouquette	Boston Red Sox	1–0	Chicago White Sox	1 2/3	Al Smith	Base on balls	
141	August 18, 1960	Lew Burdette	Milwaukee Braves	1–0	Philadelphia Phillies	4 1/3	Tony Gonzalez	Hit by pitch	Pitcher faced minimum, as Gonzalez was retired on a double play
140	May 15, 1960	Don Cardwell	Chicago Cubs	4–0	St. Louis Cardinals	0 1/3	Alex Grammas	Base on balls	
128	June 19, 1952	Carl Erskine	Brooklyn Dodgers	5–0	Chicago Cubs	2 2/3	Willie Ramsdell	Base on balls	
119	September 3, 1947	Bill McCahan	Philadelphia Athletics	3–0	Washington Senators	1 1/3	Stan Spence	Throwing error	
113	May 15, 1944	Clyde Shoun	Cincinnati Reds	1–0	Boston Braves	2 2/3	Jim Tobin	Base on balls	
103	September 21, 1934	Paul Dean	St. Louis Cardinals	6–0	Brooklyn Dodgers	0 2/3	Len Koenecke	Base on balls	
94	May 7, 1922	Jesse Barnes	New York Giants	6–0	Philadelphia Phillies	4	Cy Williams	Base on balls	Pitcher faced minimum, as Williams was retired on a double play
92	July 1, 1920	Walter Johnson	Washington Senators	1–0	Boston Red Sox	6	Harry Hooper	Error	
89	June 3, 1918	Dutch Leonard	Boston Red Sox	5–0	Detroit Tigers	0 2/3	Bobby Veach	Base on balls	
88	June 23, 1917	Babe Ruth (0 IP); Ernie Shore (9 IP)	Boston Red Sox	4–0	Washington Senators	0	Ray Morgan	Base on balls	Babe Ruth ejected after arguing leadoff walk Pitchers faced minimum, as Morgan was caught stealing
81	August 26, 1916	Bullet Joe Bush	Philadelphia Athletics	5–0	Cleveland Indians	0	Jack Graney	Base on balls	
66	August 27, 1911	Ed Walsh	Chicago White Sox	5–0	Boston Red Sox	3 2/3	Clyde Engle	Base on balls	
64	May 12, 1910	Chief Bender	Philadelphia Athletics	4–0	Cleveland Naps	3 2/3	Terry Turner	Base on balls	Pitcher faced minimum, as Turner was caught stealing
58	July 4, 1908	Hooks Wiltse	New York Giants	1–0	Philadelphia Phillies	8 2/3	George McQuillan	Hit by pitch	One strike from a perfect game Umpire Cy Rigler later admitted that he should have called the previous pitch strike three
57	June 30, 1908	Cy Young	Boston Red Sox	1–0	New York Highlanders	0	Harry Niles	Base on balls	Pitcher faced minimum, as Niles was caught stealing Pitcher pitched perfect game in 1904

=== Combined near-perfect games ===
There has never been a combined perfect game in Major League history. However, there have been five times where pitchers combined to throw at least seven perfect innings:

- On September 10, 2016, Rich Hill of the Los Angeles Dodgers threw seven perfect innings versus the Miami Marlins before Dave Roberts removed him from the game. Hill had only thrown 89 pitches and appeared to be on the verge of tears after he heard he was being taken out. Joe Blanton relieved Hill and gave up a two out single to Jeff Francoeur in the eighth inning to end the bid for a perfect game.
- On July 14, 2019, Ryne Stanek and Ryan Yarbrough of the Tampa Bay Rays threw eight innings of a perfect game versus the Baltimore Orioles before the latter's ninth inning leadoff batter, Hanser Alberto, hit a single.
- On April 13, 2022, Clayton Kershaw of the Los Angeles Dodgers threw seven perfect innings versus the Minnesota Twins before Dave Roberts removed him from the game. Kershaw had only thrown 80 pitches. Alex Vesia relieved Kershaw and gave up a one out single to Gary Sanchez in the eighth inning to end the bid for the perfect game.
- On May 29, 2023, Josh Staumont and Mike Mayers of the Kansas City Royals combined to throw seven innings of a perfect game versus the St. Louis Cardinals before Nolan Arenado hit a lead-off single, breaking up the bid in the eighth.
- On September 13, 2024, opener Beau Brieske and bulk pitcher Brant Hurter of the Detroit Tigers combined to throw seven perfect innings versus the Baltimore Orioles before Adley Rutschman worked a leadoff walk in the 8th. After the walk, Hurter (who had pitched 5.2 innings with 8 strikeouts), was relieved in favor of Brenan Hanifee, who pitched a clean 8th inning before Tyler Holton gave up a two out triple to Gunnar Henderson in the 9th.

== See also ==
- List of Major League Baseball no-hitters
- List of Nippon Professional Baseball perfect games
- Golden set in tennis
- Maximum break in snooker
- Nine-dart finish in darts
- Perfect game in bowling

== Sources ==
- Alvarez, Mark, ed. (1993). The Perfect Game: A Classic Collection of Facts, Figures, Stories and Characters from the Society for American Baseball Research (Taylor). ISBN 0-87833-815-2
- Anderson, David W. (2000). More Than Merkle: A History of the Best and Most Exciting Baseball Season in Human History (Lincoln and London: University of Nebraska Press). ISBN 0-8032-1056-6
- Browning, Reed (2003). Cy Young: A Baseball Life (Amherst: University of Massachusetts Press). ISBN 1-55849-398-0
- Buckley, James, Jr. (2002). Perfect: The Inside Story of Baseball's Seventeen Perfect Games (Triumph Books). ISBN 1-57243-454-6
- Chen, Albert (2009). "The Greatest Game Ever Pitched", Sports Illustrated (June 1; available online).
- Coffey, Michael (2004). 27 Men Out: Baseball's Perfect Games (New York: Atria Books). ISBN 0-7434-4606-2
- Cook, William A. (2004). Waite Hoyt: A Biography of the Yankees' Schoolboy Wonder (Jefferson, N.C.: McFarland). ISBN 0786419601
- Deutsch, Jordan A. et al. (1975). The Scrapbook History of Baseball (New York: Bobbs-Merrill). ISBN 0-672-52028-1
- Deveaux, Tom (2001). The Washington Senators, 1901–1971 (Jefferson, N.C.: McFarland). ISBN 0-7864-0993-2
- Dewey, Donald, and Nicholas Acocella (1995). The Biographical History of Baseball (New York: Carroll & Graf). ISBN 1-57243-567-4
- Dickson, Paul (2009). The Dickson Baseball Dictionary, 3d ed. (New York: W. W. Norton). ISBN 0-393-06681-9
- Egan, James M. (2008). Base Ball on the Western Reserve: The Early Game in Cleveland and Northeast Ohio, Year by Year and Town by Town, 1865–1900 (Jefferson, N.C.: McFarland). ISBN 0-7864-3067-2
- Elston, Gene (2006). A Stitch in Time: A Baseball Chronology, 3d ed. (Houston, Tex.: Halcyon Press). ISBN 1-931823-33-2
- Fleitz, David L. (2004). Ghosts in the Gallery at Cooperstown: Sixteen Little-Known Members of the Hall of Fame (Jefferson, N.C.: McFarland). ISBN 0-7864-1749-8
- Forker, Dom, Robert Obojski, and Wayne Stewart (2004). The Big Book of Baseball Brainteasers (Sterling). ISBN 1-4027-1337-1
- Gallagher, Mark (2003). The Yankee Encyclopedia, 6th ed. (Champaign, Ill.: Sports Publishing LLC). ISBN 1-58261-683-3
- Hanlon, John (1968). "First Perfect Game In the Major Leagues", Sports Illustrated (August 26; available online).
- James, Bill. The New Bill James Historical Baseball Abstract, rev. ed. (Simon and Schuster, 2003). ISBN 0-7432-2722-0
- Kennedy, Kostya (1996). "His Memory Is Perfect", Sports Illustrated (October 14; available online)
- Lewis, Allen (February 2002). "Eight hitless games entered the record books due to questionable scoring decisions - Statistical Data Included". Baseball Digest. 61 (2). Archived from the original on May 12, 2006 – via FindArticles.
- Lupica, Mike (1999). Summer of '98: When Homers Flew, Records Fell, and Baseball Reclaimed America (New York: G.P. Putnam's Sons). ISBN 0-399-14514-1
- McNeil, William F. (2003). The Dodgers Encyclopedia, 2d ed. (Champaign, Ill.: Sports Publishing LLC). ISBN 1-58261-633-7
- Nemec, David (2006 [1994]). The Official Rules of Baseball Illustrated (Guilford, Conn.: Globe Pequot). ISBN 1-59228-844-8
- Newman, Bruce (1981). "Perfect in Every Way", Sports Illustrated (May 25; available online).
- Nowlin, Bill (2005). "Rick Wise", in '75: The Red Sox Team That Saved Baseball, ed. Bill Nowlin and Cecilia Tan (Cambridge, Mass.: Rounder). ISBN 1-57940-127-9
- Okrent, Daniel, and Steve Wulf (1989). Baseball Anecdotes (New York and Oxford: Oxford University Press). ISBN 0-19-504396-0
- Reisler, Jim (2007). The Best Game Ever: Pirates vs. Yankees, October 13, 1960 (New York: Carroll & Graf). ISBN 0-7867-1943-5
- Robbins, Mike (2004). Ninety Feet from Fame: Close Calls with Baseball Immortality (New York: Carroll & Graf). ISBN 0-7867-1335-6
- Schneider, Russell (2005). The Cleveland Indians Encyclopedia, 3d ed. (Champaign, Ill.: Sports Publishing LLC). ISBN 1-58261-840-2
- Schott, Tom, and Nick Peters (2003). The Giants Encyclopedia (Champaign, Ill.: Sports Publishing LLC). ISBN 1-58261-693-0
- Simon, Thomas P., ed. (2004). Deadball Stars of the National League (Brassey's). ISBN 1-57488-860-9
- Sullivan, Dean, ed. (2002). Late Innings: A Documentary History of Baseball, 1945–1972 (Lincoln: University of Nebraska Press). ISBN 0-8032-9285-6
- Thielman, Jim (2005). Cool of the Evening: The 1965 Minnesota Twins (Minneapolis, Minn.: Kirk House Publishers). ISBN 1886513716
- Vass, George (1998). "Here Are the 13 Most Fascinating No-Hitters", Baseball Digest (June).
- Vass, George (August 2002). "Seven most improbable no-hitters: since 1901, there have been more than 200 hitless games in the major leagues with some being more unlikely than others". Baseball Digest. 61 (8). Archived from the original on November 14, 2004 – via FindArticles.
- Vass, George (June 2007). "One out away from fame: the final out of hitless games has often proved to be a pitcher's toughest conquest". Baseball Digest. 66 (4). Archived from the original on July 2, 2011 – via FindArticles.
- Westcott, Rich (2005). Veterans Stadium: Field of Memories (Philadelphia: Temple University Press). ISBN 1-59213-428-9
- Young, Mark C. (1997). The Guinness Book of Sports Records (Guinness Media). ISBN 0-9652383-1-8
- Zingg, Paul J., and Mark D. Medeiros (1994). Runs, Hits, and an Era: the Pacific Coast League, 1903–58 (Champaign: University of Illinois Press). ISBN 0-252-06402-X
