= Kenny Rogers' perfect game =

1994 baseball game in Texas, U.S.

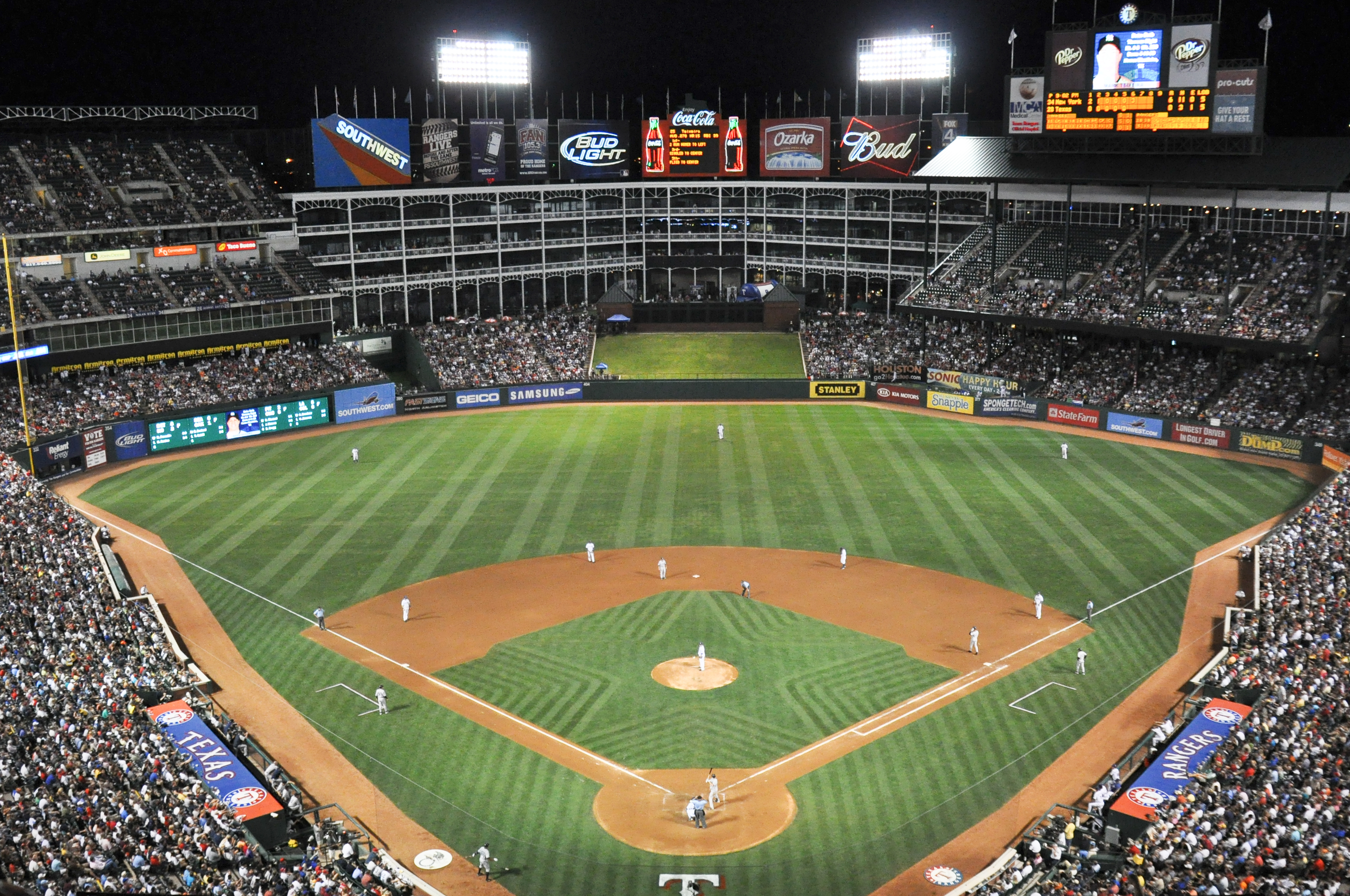
- The game took place at The Ballpark at Arlington
California Angels	Texas Rangers
0	4
	1	2	3	4	5	6	7	8	9	R	H	E
California Angels	0	0	0	0	0	0	0	0	0	0	0	0
Texas Rangers	2	0	2	0	0	0	0	0	X	4	6	0
- Date: July 28, 1994
- Venue: The Ballpark in Arlington
- City: Arlington, Texas
- Managers: Marcel Lachemann (California Angels); Kevin Kennedy (Texas Rangers)
- Umpires: HP: Ed Bean; 1B: Don Denkinger; 2B: John Shulock; 3B: Tim Tschida
- Attendance: 46,581
- Television: Home Sports Entertainment
- TV announcers: Greg Lucas (play-by-play); Norm Hitzges (color commentary)

On July 28, 1994, Kenny Rogers of the Texas Rangers pitched the 14th perfect game in Major League Baseball history, blanking the California Angels 4–0 at The Ballpark at Arlington. Needing 98 pitches to complete his masterpiece, Rogers struck out eight batters. He also survived three-ball counts to seven Angel hitters. The perfect game is, as of 2025, the most recent no-hitter in Ranger history.

Rogers said he did not think about the perfect game until the ninth inning—and the bid was almost broken up one batter in. Rookie center fielder Rusty Greer preserved the bid by making a diving catch of Rex Hudler's sinking line drive to right-center leading off the inning. Greer also caught Gary DiSarcina's fly ball for the game's final out.

Offensively for the Rangers, Jose Canseco hit two home runs. One of them came in the third inning and was on the front end of back-to-back homers with Iván Rodríguez, Rogers' catcher.

The perfect game came three years to the day after Dennis Martínez's perfect game, the last perfect game prior to this one, and made Rogers the third left-hander to pitch a perfect game, joining Sandy Koufax in 1965 and Tom Browning in 1988. It also came 10 years after the Angels' Mike Witt pitched his perfect game against the Rangers, that game taking place in The Ballpark's predecessor, Arlington Stadium. As of 2022, the Angels and Rangers are the only two teams to record perfect games against each other.

The home plate umpire was minor league fill-in Ed Bean, who was working in his 29th Major League game and seventh as home plate umpire. Bean worked only seven more Major League games.

== Boxscore ==
Team	1	2	3	4	5	6	7	8	9	R	H	E
California Angels (42–61)	0	0	0	0	0	0	0	0	0	0	0	0
Texas Rangers (49–53)	2	0	2	0	0	0	0	0	x	4	6	0
WP: Kenny Rogers (11–6) LP: Andrew Lorraine (0–2); Home runs: CAL: None; TEX: Jose Canseco 2 (29), Iván Rodríguez (14)
