= Tom Dunbar =

American baseball player (1959–2011)

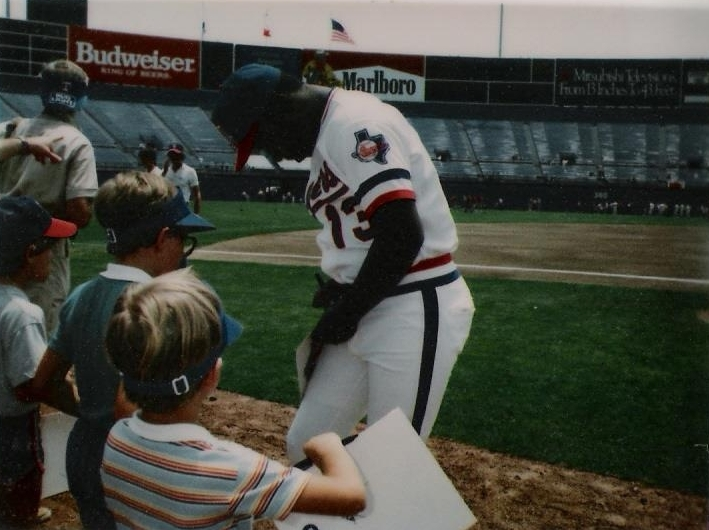
- Outfielder
- Born: November 24, 1959; Graniteville, South Carolina, U.S.
- Died: March 16, 2011 (aged 51); Aiken, South Carolina, U.S.
- Batted: Left Threw: Left

MLB debut
- September 7, 1983, for the Texas Rangers

Last MLB appearance
- July 13, 1985, for the Texas Rangers

MLB statistics
- Batting average: .231
- Home runs: 3
- Runs batted in: 18
- Stats at Baseball Reference

Teams
- Texas Rangers (1983–1985)

Thomas Jerome Dunbar (November 24, 1959 – March 16, 2011) was an American professional baseball player who played as outfielder in Major League Baseball (MLB) for three seasons with the Texas Rangers from 1983 until 1985. He was 6'2", 192 pounds, and he threw and batted left-handed. He played college baseball at Middle Georgia College.

== Career ==
Dunbar was originally drafted by the Boston Red Sox in the 11th round (286th overall), of the 1979 draft. Deciding not to sign that year, he was drafted by the Rangers in the 1st round (25th overall) of the 1980 draft, after which he signed.

Dunbar won the 1984 American Association batting title with a .337 average, as well as having the league leading on-base percentage of .417 for the Oklahoma City 89ers.

He played a total of 91 major league games, making his debut on September 7, 1983, at the age of 23. He hit .231 with three home runs and 18 RBI, striking out 32 times and walking 23. In the field, he committed four errors for a .929 fielding percentage, below average for an outfielder. He played his final game on July 13, 1985, though continued to play in the minors until 1991. His most notable game was Mike Witt's perfect game in the 1984 season finale. He went 0 for 3 including a strikeout leading off the bottom of the ninth. He could apparently hit the knuckleball, however, going 3-for-7 lifetime against Phil Niekro, one of three Hall of Famers he would face in his career (Rollie Fingers and Bert Blyleven being the others).

After retirement he worked in the Cincinnati Reds organization as a minor league coach and manager.

Dunbar died at the age of 51 on March 16, 2011, in Aiken, South Carolina, while recuperating from prostate cancer surgery.
