= Rusty Greer =

American baseball player (born 1969)

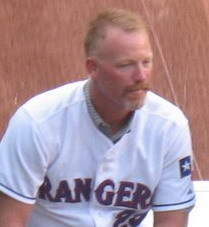
- Greer in 2007
- Left fielder
- Born: January 21, 1969 (age 57); Fort Rucker, Alabama, U.S.
- Batted: Left Threw: Left

MLB debut
- May 16, 1994, for the Texas Rangers

Last MLB appearance
- July 11, 2002, for the Texas Rangers

MLB statistics
- Batting average: .305
- Home runs: 119
- Runs batted in: 614
- Stats at Baseball Reference

Teams
- Texas Rangers (1994–2002)

Career highlights and awards
- Texas Rangers Hall of Fame

Thurman Clyde "Rusty" Greer III (born January 21, 1969) is an American former professional baseball outfielder who played in Major League Baseball for the Texas Rangers from 1994 to 2002. He is currently the Head Baseball Coach for Fort Worth Christian School.

== Biography ==
Greer attended high school in Albertville, Alabama before playing college baseball at the University of Montevallo. (Montevallo was the only college interested in Greer prior to a senior-year all-star game where he finally drew attention from larger schools; however, he chose to remain at Montevallo since they initially offered him a scholarship.) While at Montevallo, Greer was a Resident Assistant in Napier Hall. The Rangers made him their tenth-round pick (279th overall) in the 1990 amateur draft, and he spent the rest of the season playing for their rookie-level minor league club in Butte, Montana. He would spend all 15 years of his professional baseball career in the Rangers organization, a feat that had become a rarity among professional ballplayers thanks to free agency.

At Butte, he batted .345 with an OPS of 1.032, which earned him a promotion to the Class A Florida State League the following season. He finished 1991 with the Class AA Tulsa Drillers in the Texas League; he stayed with Tulsa through 1992 and most of 1993, before being called up to the Class AAA Oklahoma City 89ers for eight games. He also started the 1994 season with the 89ers, batting .315 in 31 games, when he earned a call-up to the Rangers.

== Major league career ==
Greer continued his successful run at Oklahoma when he was called up to Texas, where he batted .314 with ten home runs in 80 games, including one in his second major-league at bat, thus becoming the second Ranger to accomplish this feat. (Rubén Sierra was the first on June 1, 1986, at Kansas City) He also played an integral part in baseball history against the Anaheim Angels on July 28, 1994, when he made a diving catch of Rex Hudler's fly ball to protect a perfect game by Kenny Rogers. Although that was one of the most significant catches he made in his career, he made many others like it, and his all-out style of play made him a fan favorite throughout his major-league career. Greer also caught Gary DiSarcina's fly ball for the game's final out.

Greer cooled off slightly in his second season, batting .271. However, in 1996, he had one of the best seasons of his career, batting .332 (fifth in the American League) and having his first of three 100-RBI seasons.

The 1997 season also proved successful for Greer, as he finished seventh in the AL with a .321 batting average, played in a career-high 157 games, and he hit a career-high 26 home runs. In 1998, he had a career-high 108 RBI and a .306 batting average. The Rangers honored him for his contributions by granting him a new contract that paid him $3.3 million in 1999, up from $1.025 million the previous season. In 1999, he batted an even .300 with 20 home runs, 101 RBI, and a career-high 96 walks (to go with 67 strikeouts). In the 2000 season, he was limited to 105 games due to injuries and posted a batting average of .297, with eight home runs.

In 2001, Greer was limited to 62 games because of injuries, but he still hit seven home runs. Still a fan favorite, he was honored with a three-year, $21 million contract before the 2002 season. However, due to injuries he would only play 51 games with the Rangers in 2002.

== Injuries and attempted comeback ==
Greer's aggressive style of play took a severe toll on his body, and he spent the remainder of his baseball career undergoing and recovering from surgeries. After first coming off of the disabled list in 2002, he was only able to play one more game, on July 11 of that year, before going back on the disabled list. On August 22, he had surgery to fuse the C5 and C6 vertebrae in his neck; and in the offseason, he had surgery to repair a torn rotator cuff in his shoulder. He was then expected to miss the entire 2003 season. While rehabilitating from the rotator cuff surgery, he had to undergo Tommy John surgery and an ulnar nerve transposition in July 2003. He actually was also supposed to receive operations on his right hip and right knee, but he decided against those. He also had surgery in the following offseason to remove scar tissue that had built up in his elbow, and early in the 2004 season he had additional surgery to remove scar tissue from his shoulder.

Nevertheless, he was still determined to come back; and he and the Rangers expected to see him back on the field as a designated hitter during the last month of their season. He worked out at the Rangers' spring training facility in Surprise, Arizona, with the intention of doing a rehabilitation assignment in the minor leagues shortly thereafter. However, his workout was cut short; he returned to Texas, where he had surgery to remove scar tissue on his forearm and was declared out for the season. The Rangers, not surprisingly, decided to buy out the option year on his contract; he actually made almost as much money during the two lost seasons as he did in the rest of his career combined.

Greer received invitations from the Rangers and the Minnesota Twins to go to spring training as a non-roster invitee, but he decided that he would rather retire than move his family to another state. Thus, on February 20, 2005, he announced his retirement, officially ending his comeback attempt.

On August 11, 2007, the Rangers inducted Greer into the Texas Rangers Hall of Fame.

== Career statistics ==
Seasons	Games	PA	AB	R	H	2B	3B	HR	RBI	SB	BB	SO	HBP	AVG	OBP	SLG	FLD%
9	1027	4420	3829	643	1166	258	25	119	614	31	519	555	22	.305	.387	.478	.978

In the 1996, '98 and '99 American League Division Series, Greer batted only .111 (4-for-36). He played all three outfield positions and first base in his career. His fielding percentage was .980 at left field, .970 at right field, .981 at center field and .960 at first base. At 9 years, Greer had the longest tenure of any player to only play for the Rangers during his career.

== Life after playing career ==
Today, Greer resides in Colleyville, Texas and has three children. For several years he ran a baseball training facility, the Rusty Greer Baseball School, in Euless, Texas. Greer announced in 2022 that he would be closing the school to take an assignment with the Jacksonville State Gamecocks as the Graduate Baseball Manager.

On July 12, 2023, Greer was named Head Baseball Coach at Fort Worth Christian School located in North Richland Hills, Texas.
