= Greg Kosc =

American baseball umpire (born 1949)

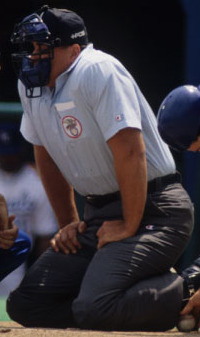
- Kosc in 1992
- Born: Gregory John Kosc; April 27, 1949 (age 77)
- Occupation: Major League Baseball umpire
- Years active: 1976–1999

Gregory John Kosc (born April 27, 1949) is a former umpire in Major League Baseball who worked in the American League from 1976 to 1999. He officiated in the World Series in 1987 and 1997, and in the All-Star Game in 1981 and 1992. He also worked the American League Championship Series in 1979, 1988 and 1993, and the American League Division Series in 1996 and 1997. Kosc wore uniform number 18 when the American League umpires adopted them in 1980.

Kosc attended UTEP where he competed in weightlifting, hammer throw and shot put.

Kosc and fellow 1976 rookie Al Clark were the first American League umpires who never used the outside chest protector, which had been used since the league's formation in 1901 and was mandated in the 1920s by future Hall of Fame arbiter Tommy Connolly. In 1975, the year before Clark's hiring, the American League ruled umpires could use the outside protector or the National League standard inside protector, invented in the 1910s by another Hall of Fame umpire, Bill Klem. In 1977, the AL ruled all incoming umpires had to use the inside protector, an edict which affected new hires Steve Palermo and Durwood Merrill. Umpires active prior to 1977 using the outside (a.k.a. "balloon") protector could continue to use it until they retired or switched to the inside protector.

Kosc was the first base umpire for Len Barker's perfect game on May 15, 1981, and was behind the plate for Mike Witt's perfect game on September 30, 1984; he is one of only seven umpires to have worked in two perfect games. He was an umpire on September 6, 1995, when Cal Ripken Jr. broke Lou Gehrig's consecutive games played streak.

He was also one of the umpires for the single-game playoff to decide the AL West title in 1995 and later on was one of those 22 umpires who submitted their resignations as part of a failed union strategy in 1999, a move which backfired badly for most of them, when Major League Baseball opted to accept the resignations. Kosc never obtained his position again after certain umpires were restored to the active list.

He is a resident of Medina, Ohio.

== See also ==
- List of Major League Baseball umpires (disambiguation)
