= Ed Bean =

American baseball umpire

- Umpire
- Born: 1963 or 1964 (age 61–62)

MLB debut
- June 3, 1994

Last MLB appearance
- August 7, 1994

Career highlights and awards
- Special assignments: Home plate umpire for Kenny Rogers' perfect game (July 28, 1994)

Ed Bean is an American former professional baseball umpire who worked in the American League during the 1994 season. Bean officiated a total of 36 games before the 1994 MLB strike interrupted the season in early August.

At age 30, Bean was in his eighth year calling Minor League Baseball games up to Triple-A Pacific Coast League, being called up as a fill-in for vacationing 17-year veteran Ken Kaiser. He umpired his first major league game on June 3.

But Bean gained some recognition because he was at home plate for the perfect game by Kenny Rogers on July 28, 1994. He was working his 29th game and seventh behind the plate.

Bean umpired his last MLB game on August 7. He did not come back the following season.

In 2019, Bean was living in Polk City, Florida.

== See also ==
- List of Major League Baseball umpires (disambiguation)
