= Mike Witt =

American baseball player (born 1960)

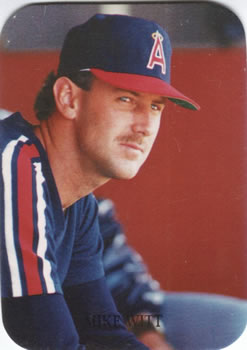
- Witt with the Angels in 1987
- Pitcher
- Born: July 20, 1960 (age 66); Fullerton, California, U.S.
- Batted: Right Threw: Right

MLB debut
- April 11, 1981, for the California Angels

Last MLB appearance
- June 17, 1993, for the New York Yankees

MLB statistics
- Win–loss record: 117–116
- Earned run average: 3.83
- Strikeouts: 1,373
- Stats at Baseball Reference

Teams
- California Angels (1981–1990); New York Yankees (1990–1991, 1993)

Career highlights and awards
- 2× All-Star (1986, 1987); Pitched a perfect game on September 30, 1984; Pitched a combined no-hitter on April 11, 1990; Angels Hall of Fame

Michael Atwater Witt (born July 20, 1960) is an American former professional baseball pitcher. He played 12 seasons in Major League Baseball between 1981 and 1993 for the California Angels and New York Yankees. Witt threw the 11th perfect game in MLB history in 1984 and was a two-time MLB All-Star.

== Early life ==
Witt was born on July 20, 1960, in Fullerton, California, to a family of six children. His father worked for Colgate-Palmolive and his mother was a teacher at a Catholic school. Witt started playing Little League Baseball at age 9, and when he was 10, his oldest brother taught him how to throw the curveball, which became his primary pitch.

He played both baseball and basketball competitively for Servite High School. As a 6-ft, 7-in tall All-County basketball player, many assumed basketball would be his sport of choice, but he found baseball more enjoyable. His pitching took Servite to a 14-0 record and victory at the 1978 CIF Southern Section 4A baseball championship, and he was named the Angelus League's Player of the Year.

== Professional career ==
=== Draft and minor leagues ===
Witt was drafted out of high school in the fourth round of the 1978 Major League Baseball draft.

He was sent first to the Rookie League Idaho Falls Angels of the Pioneer League, then the Single-A Salinas Spurs in 1979. He was promoted to the El Paso Diablos in 1980, and despite having only a dozen Double-A games to his name, was invited to spring training with the California Angels for 1981.

=== California Angels (1981–1990) ===
At 20 years of age, Witt made his major league debut with the California Angels on April 11, 1981. He went 8-9 with a 3.28 ERA his rookie season, which was shortened by the Major League Baseball strike. He stumbled in his third season, finishing 7-14 with a 4.91 ERA, and was sent to play for the Tiburones de La Guaira of the Venezuelan League, where he won seven of eight decisions.

Possessing a great curveball as well as a good fastball, Witt's breakout season came in 1984, when he went 15–11 for the Angels. On July 23 of that year, he struck out 16 Seattle Mariners during a complete game five-hitter; but the highlight of the year came on the final day of the season, September 30, when he pitched the 11th perfect game in baseball history against the Texas Rangers at Arlington Stadium. He struck out 10 and needed just 94 pitches to complete the gem. Witt's perfect game is, as of 2020, one of five no-hitters pitched on the final day of a Major League Baseball regular season.

From 1984 to 1987, Witt led the Angels every year in wins, strikeouts, innings pitched, and complete games. His best season was 1986, when he was named team Most Valuable Player after compiling 18 wins and a 2.84 earned run average, finishing third behind Roger Clemens and Teddy Higuera for the American League Cy Young Award, and guiding the Angels to within one strike of the World Series.

In the middle of the 1987 season, however, Witt suddenly lost his overpowering stuff and saw his strikeout numbers decline significantly. He did manage to combine with starter Mark Langston to pitch a no-hitter on April 11, 1990, against Seattle, pitching the last two innings. Combined with his perfect game, this makes him the only pitcher to pitch in relief in a no-hitter, while also pitching a full no-hitter.

=== New York Yankees (1990–1991, 1993) ===
On May 11, 1990, Witt was traded to the New York Yankees in exchange for Dave Winfield, but suffered his first career injury on his fifth start. He was re-signed by the Yankees to an $8 million, 3-year contract, but missed most of the 1991 and 1992 seasons while recovering from Tommy John surgery, and he won no more than five games before retiring in 1993.

== Personal life ==
Witt met Lisa Fenn, who worked for the Angels' group sales department, his rookie year. They wed in 1983, and have three children: daughter Kellen Marie and sons Justin and Kevin.

Witt did not pursue a coaching career in college or professional baseball as he wanted to spend time with his family. He transitioned to coaching high school, starting with Dana Hills High School in 1994. He followed his sons in 2000 to Santa Margarita Catholic High School, becoming varsity assistant and pitching coach there.

== See also ==
- Pitchers who have thrown a perfect game

Preceded by Len Barker	Perfect game pitcher September 30, 1984	Succeeded by Tom Browning
Preceded by Jack Morris	No-hitter pitcher September 30, 1984	Succeeded by Joe Cowley
Preceded by Tom Browning	No-hit game April 11, 1990 (with Mark Langston)	Succeeded by Randy Johnson
