= Mike Witt's perfect game =

MLB perfect game

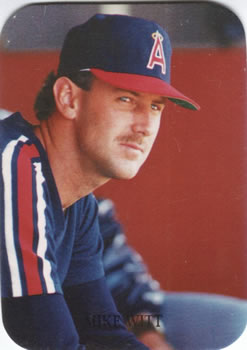
- Mike Witt in 1987
California Angels	Texas Rangers
1	0
	1	2	3	4	5	6	7	8	9	R	H	E
California Angels	0	0	0	0	0	0	1	0	0	1	7	0
Texas Rangers	0	0	0	0	0	0	0	0	0	0	0	0
- Date: September 30, 1984
- Venue: Arlington Stadium
- City: Arlington, Texas
- Managers: John McNamara (California Angels); Doug Rader (Texas Rangers)
- Umpires: HP: Greg Kosc; 1B: Ted Hendry; 2B: Drew Coble; 3B: Jim Evans
- Attendance: 8,375

On September 30, 1984, Mike Witt of the California Angels threw a perfect game against the Texas Rangers at Arlington Stadium. It was the 11th perfect game in Major League Baseball (MLB) history. Witt threw 94 pitches, struck out 10 of the 27 batters he faced, and had a game score of 97.

Witt's perfect game occurred on the final day of the 1984 MLB season. Both the Angels and Rangers had already been eliminated from playoff contention, and as a result, a small crowd of 8,375 people attended the game. The opposing pitcher was Charlie Hough, who threw a complete game and allowed one unearned run. Of the 27 batters Witt faced, only a few threatened to reach base. Larry Parrish hit a ground ball that forced third baseman Doug DeCinces to make a barehanded throw in the fifth inning. Parrish also hit a long fly out in the eighth inning that Witt initially assumed was going to be a home run.

After the game, Rangers manager Doug Rader said that Rangers batters had a hard time seeing pitches due to glare from the sun, and some Rangers players complained that umpire Greg Kosc gave Witt too large of a strike zone. As the perfect game occurred on the final game of the season between two teams who were not going to make the playoffs, and simultaneously with a Dallas Cowboys game, there was little publicity, and many people within the Dallas–Fort Worth metroplex were unaware of what had happened. Witt finished his career as a two-time All-Star with a win-loss record of 117–116.

== Background ==
=== Perfect game ===
In baseball, a perfect game occurs when one or more pitchers for one team complete a full game with no batter from the opposing team reaching base. In baseball leagues that feature nine-inning games like Major League Baseball (MLB), this means the pitchers involved must record an out against 27 consecutive batters without a hit, walk, hit batsman, catcher's or fielder's interference, or fielding error or uncaught third strike which allows a batter to reach base. It is widely considered by sportswriters to be the hardest single-game accomplishment in the sport, as it requires an incredible pitching performance, defensive support, and immense luck to pull off. Since 1876, there have been over 237,000 games officially recognized by MLB; only 24 have been perfect games. Prior to Witt's perfect game, the most recent occurrence was in 1981, when Len Barker of the Cleveland Indians threw one against the Toronto Blue Jays.

=== Mike Witt ===
Mike Witt was drafted by the California Angels in 1978 and made the Angels opening day roster in 1981. He finished fifth in Rookie of the Year voting and put up respectable stats in his first two years as both a starting pitcher and long reliever. The 1983 Angels were expected to compete for the World Series, but underperformed, and Witt had his worst season, with a win-loss record of 7–14 and a 4.91 earned run average (ERA). At the insistence of pitching coach Marcel Lachemann, Witt played in the Venezuelan Professional Baseball League during the offseason to hone his skills and sought the help of professional hypnotists to increase his concentration when pitching. These decisions worked, and in 1984 Witt had his best season, finishing with a record of 15–11 and a 3.47 ERA. His 223 strikeouts were third most in the American League that year.

== The game ==
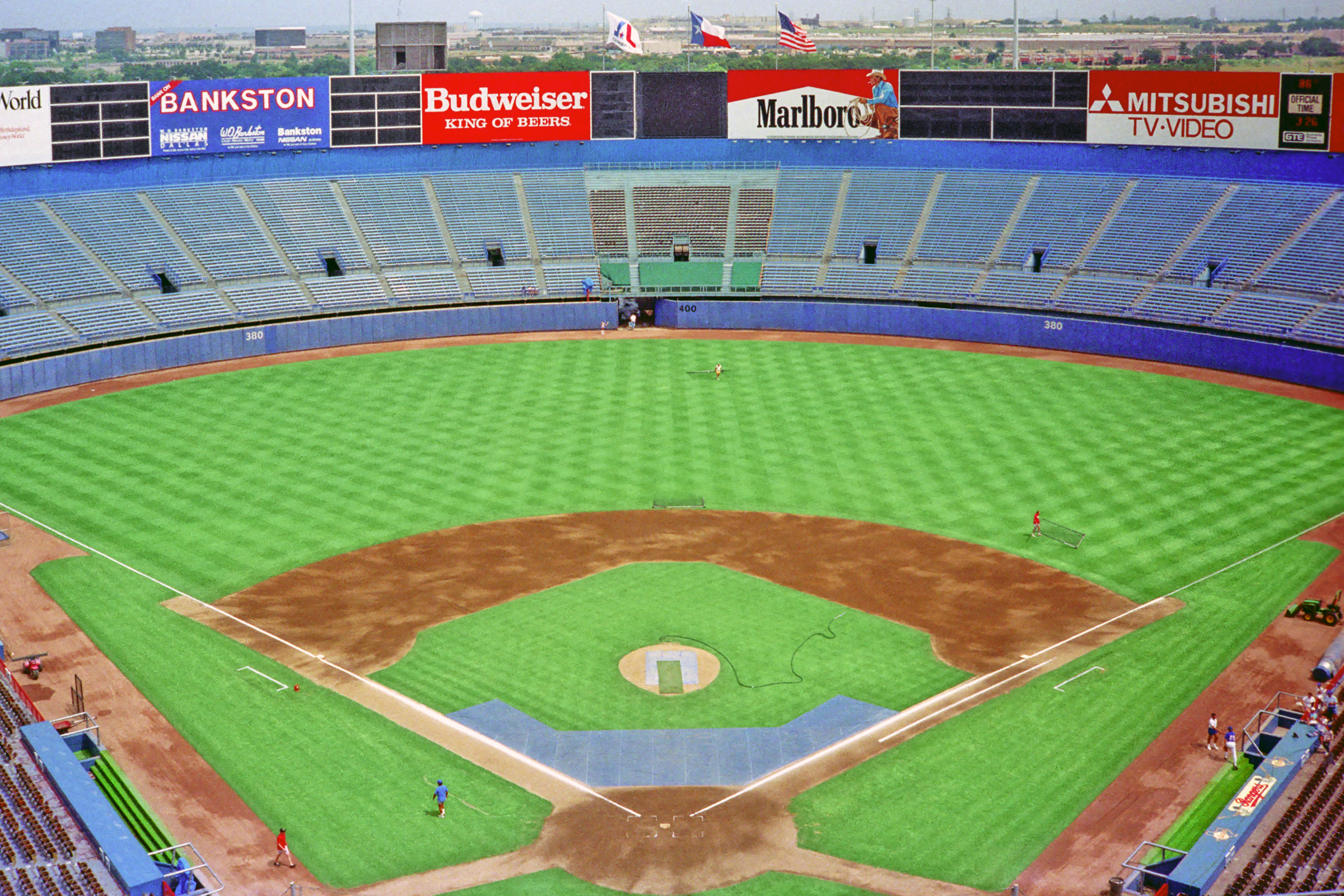
Arlington Stadium, the site of Witt's perfect game

Witt's perfect game occurred on September 30, 1984, the final day of the 1984 season. The Angels were playing the Texas Rangers at Arlington Stadium in Arlington, Texas. Both teams had already been eliminated from playoff contention, and as a result, a small crowd of 8,375 people attended the game. Witt recalled how he felt calm that day: "It was perfect weather, seventy-five degrees, no wind, no clouds ... I was nice and loosey-goosey, no tenseness." By comparison, Rangers batter Mickey Rivers noted how he and many of his teammates wanted the season to be over and that they did not take the game seriously for the first five innings.

Witt's opposition was pitcher Charlie Hough, a knuckleballer who was trying to win his 17th game of the season. Witt was excellent through the first three innings, striking out four of the first nine batters. After the third inning, Hough said to his teammates "The stuff he's got, he's got a chance to do it." After an uneventful fourth inning, Larry Parrish led off the fifth inning for the Rangers with a bouncing ground ball to third baseman Doug DeCinces, who fielded the ball barehanded and threw Parrish out at first base. DeCinces later remarked: "At the time it was a nice play, no big deal. But as you looked back on it, you thought, wow, that could have been the difference."

Through six innings, the game remained scoreless. Hough was pitching well, allowing just three hits so far. In the top of the seventh inning, DeCinces led off for the Angels with a single and advanced to second base on a passed ball. Two batters later, Reggie Jackson hit into a fielder's choice, which allowed DeCinces to score the only run of the game. Due to the passed ball, Hough was credited with an unearned run. In the bottom of the seventh inning, Witt was in danger of walking Wayne Tolleson, who had a count of three balls and no strikes. Witt assumed Tolleson was not going to swing at the next two pitches, and threw two strikes. After the second strike, Witt walked halfway toward Tolleson in an attempt to intimidate him. On the next pitch, Tolleson grounded out to second baseman Rob Wilfong.

By this point, many people within the stadium began to realize Witt was pitching a perfect game. Witt's wife Lisa was in attendance, and although she did not know what a perfect game was, she did know her husband was pitching a no-hitter. Journalist Ross Newhan was writing a wrap-up story about the Angels season and a preview of the playoffs for the Los Angeles Times and was not closely paying attention to the game until the sixth inning. Newhan admitted he rooted for the Rangers to get a baserunner, because he did not want to completely rewrite his story in such a short time. Tim Kurkjian of The Dallas Morning News echoed this remark, and said he only started caring about the game once he noticed the Rangers did not have any baserunners.

In the eighth inning, Parrish hit a long fly ball that Witt initially assumed was going to be a home run before Mike Brown caught it at the warning track. Witt then struck out the next two batters and took the perfect game into the ninth inning. After another strikeout from Tom Dunbar, Witt induced a ground out from pinch hitter Bobby Jones. The final out came on a ground out from pinch hitter Marv Foley, in what was the last at bat of his career. The game lasted 1 hour and 49 minutes, and Witt had thrown 94 pitches. According to ESPN, Witt threw 55 curveballs, 37 fastballs, and 2 changeups. Of the 27 batters he faced, Witt struck out 10, and had a game score of 97.

== Aftermath ==
After recording the final out, Witt's teammates mobbed him on the pitcher's mound and began celebrating. In a post-game interview, Witt admitted that although he knew he was potentially throwing a perfect game as early as the fourth inning, he was still more focused on simply winning the game. It was only after the Angels took the lead in the seventh inning that he began to fixate on the idea of completing the perfect game. Rangers manager Doug Rader complained that the Rangers players were affected by the glare of the sun and that they had a hard time seeing pitches. Rader said to reporters: "No one could see the son of a bitch ... but I'm not saying that to detract from what the kid did. This was no fluke." Some Rangers players also complained that umpire Greg Kosc gave Witt too large of a strike zone. Hough praised Witt, and said "I saw Jerry Reuss and John Candelaria pitch no-hitters, but this was by far the most overpowering. I mean, this was no contest."

James Buckley, the author of the book Perfect: The Inside Story of Baseball's Sixteen Perfect Games, described Witt's perfect game as arguably the least publicized perfect game since World War II. The perfect game occurred on the final day of the season between two teams who had already been eliminated, while simultaneously a National Football League game between the Dallas Cowboys and Chicago Bears was underway. The following day, Dallas newspapers like the Dallas Times Herald barely mentioned Witt's perfect game, and as a result, many people within the Dallas–Fort Worth metroplex were unaware of what had happened. Witt made one televised appearance on Good Morning America talking about the game.

In 1985, Witt became the ace of the Angels pitching staff, and the following season, Witt finished with a win-loss record of 18–10. The Angels reached the American League Championship Series, but lost to the Boston Red Sox in seven games. Witt was an All-Star in 1986 and 1987, but his pitching began to worsen, and in 1990 he was traded to the New York Yankees for Dave Winfield. After several injuries and two mediocre seasons with the Yankees, Witt retired following the 1993 season. Whenever Witt went into a slump, he rewatched footage of his perfect game and tried to figure out what worked in that game and how to replicate it. Witt finished his career with a win-loss record of 117–116, and a 3.83 ERA.

== Statistics ==
Statistics taken from Baseball-Reference.com

=== Line score ===
Team	1	2	3	4	5	6	7	8	9	R	H	E
California Angels (81–81)	0	0	0	0	0	0	1	0	0	1	7	0
Texas Rangers (69–92)	0	0	0	0	0	0	0	0	0	0	0	0
WP: Mike Witt (15-11) LP: Charlie Hough (16-14)

=== Box score ===
California	AB	R	H	RBI	BB	SO	AVG
Rob Wilfong, 2B	4	0	0	0	0	0	.248
Daryl Sconiers, 1B	4	0	0	0	0	3	.244
Bobby Grich, 1B	0	0	0	0	0	0	.256
Fred Lynn, CF-RF	3	0	2	0	1	0	.271
Doug DeCinces, 3B	4	1	2	0	0	0	.269
Brian Downing, LF	4	0	0	0	0	0	.275
Derrel Thomas, LF	0	0	0	0	0	0	.243
Reggie Jackson, DH	4	0	0	1	0	0	.223
Mike Brown, RF	3	0	3	0	1	0	.284
Gary Pettis, PR-CF	0	0	0	0	0	0	.227
Bob Boone, C	3	0	0	0	0	0	.202
Dick Schofield, SS	2	0	0	0	1	0	.193
Totals	31	1	7	1	3	3	.226

California	IP	H	R	ER	BB	SO	HR	ERA
Mike Witt (W, 15-11)	9	0	0	0	0	10	0	3.47
Totals	9	0	0	0	0	10	0	0.00

Texas	AB	R	H	RBI	BB	SO	AVG
Mickey Rivers, DH	3	0	0	0	0	2	.300
Wayne Tolleson, 2B	3	0	0	0	0	0	.213
Gary Ward, LF	3	0	0	0	0	0	.284
Larry Parrish, 3B	3	0	0	0	0	0	.285
Pete O'Brien, 1B	3	0	0	0	0	1	.287
George Wright, CF	3	0	0	0	0	3	.243
Tom Dunbar, RF	3	0	0	0	0	2	.258
Donnie Scott, C	2	0	0	0	0	2	.221
Bobby Jones, PH	1	0	0	0	0	0	.259
Curtis Wilkerson, SS	2	0	0	0	0	0	.248
Marv Foley, PH	1	0	0	0	0	0	.217
Totals	27	0	0	0	0	10	.000

Texas	IP	H	R	ER	BB	SO	HR	ERA
Charlie Hough (L, 16-14)	9	7	1	0	3	3	0	3.76
Totals	9	7	1	0	3	3	0	0.00
