= Kenny Rogers (baseball) =

American baseball player (born 1964)

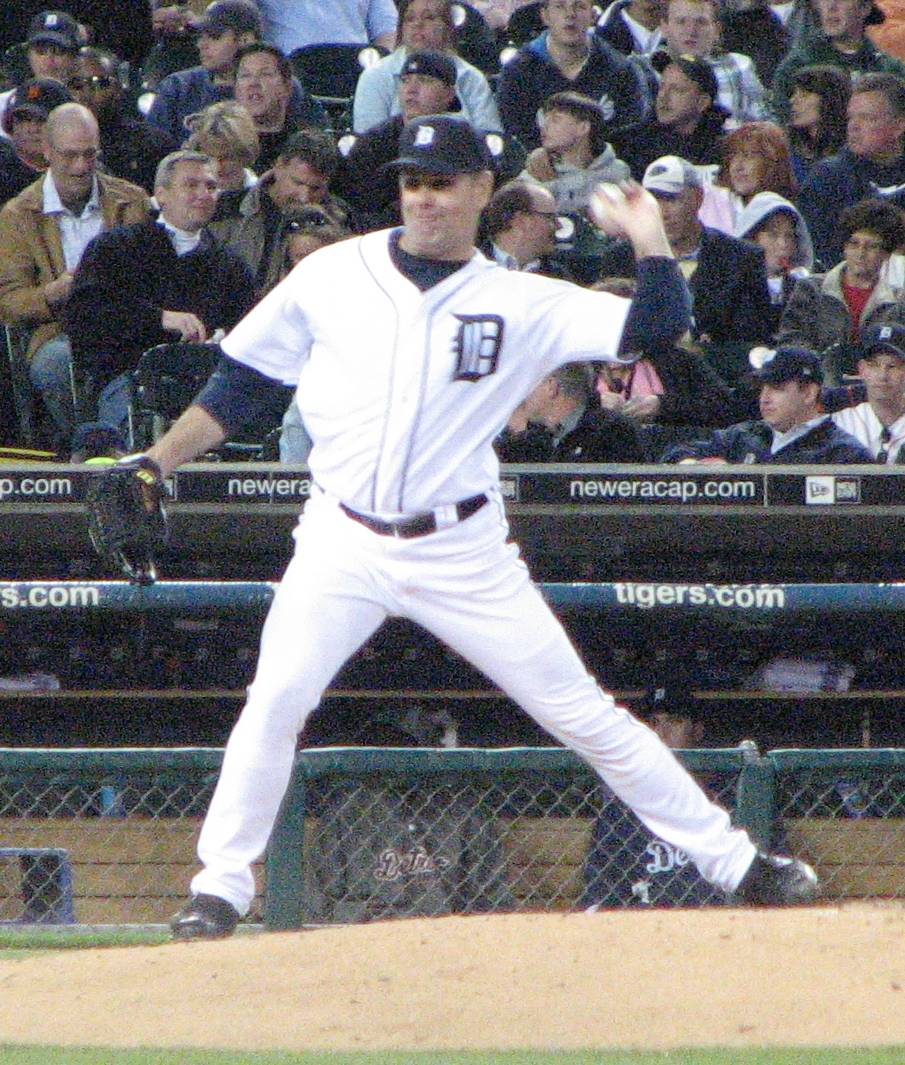
- Rogers with the Detroit Tigers in 2008
- Pitcher
- Born: November 10, 1964 (age 61); Savannah, Georgia, U.S.
- Batted: Left Threw: Left

MLB debut
- April 6, 1989, for the Texas Rangers

Last MLB appearance
- September 30, 2008, for the Detroit Tigers

MLB statistics
- Win–loss record: 219–156
- Earned run average: 4.27
- Strikeouts: 1,968
- Stats at Baseball Reference

Teams
- Texas Rangers (1989–1995); New York Yankees (1996–1997); Oakland Athletics (1998–1999); New York Mets (1999); Texas Rangers (2000–2002); Minnesota Twins (2003); Texas Rangers (2004–2005); Detroit Tigers (2006–2008)

Career highlights and awards
- 4× All-Star (1995, 2004–2006); World Series champion (1996); 5× Gold Glove Award (2000, 2002, 2004–2006); Pitched a perfect game on July 28, 1994; Texas Rangers Hall of Fame

Kenneth Scott Rogers (born November 10, 1964) is an American former Major League Baseball (MLB) pitcher, with a 20-year career (1989 to 2008) for six different teams. He won the 1996 World Series with the New York Yankees over the Atlanta Braves, and played in the 2006 World Series with the Detroit Tigers. In addition to being known for his fielding (winning five Gold Glove Awards), he pitched the 14th perfect game in MLB history. In 2008, he was the oldest baseball player in the American League.

Rogers is nicknamed "the Gambler" after a song made famous by the singer who shares his name.

== Biography ==
Rogers was born in Savannah, Georgia, and grew up on a 15-acre (6.1 ha) farm in Dover, Florida.

Rogers and his wife, Rebecca Lewis, reside in Westlake, Texas, with their two children. He enjoys golf, fishing and building houses for Habitat for Humanity.

== Baseball career ==
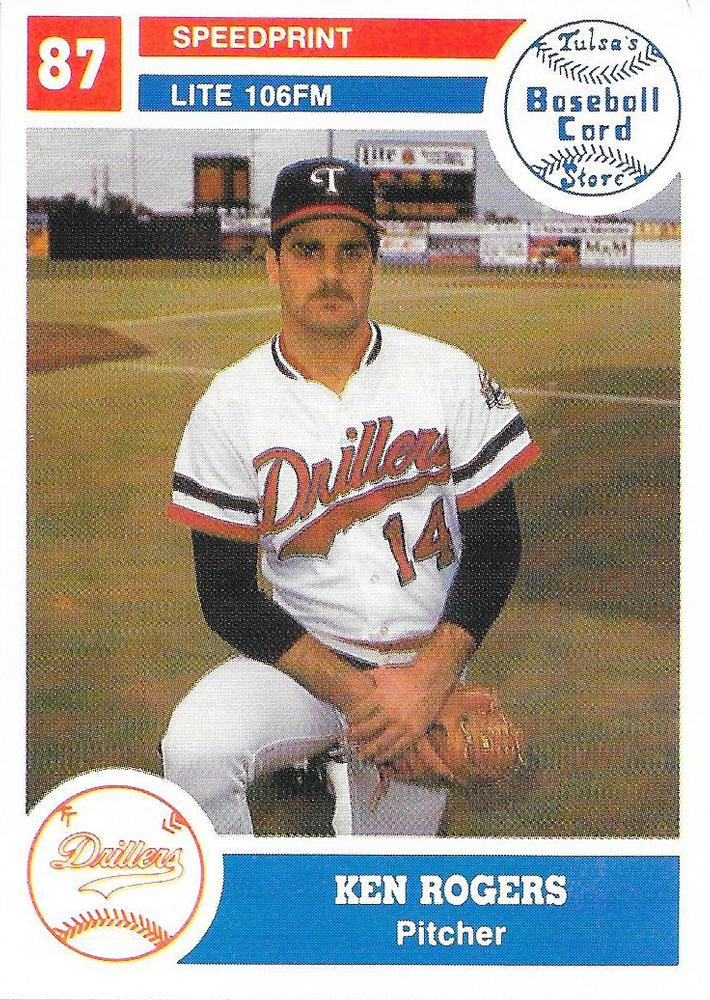
A 1987 baseball card of Rogers with the Tulsa Drillers

Rogers graduated from Plant City High School in Florida in 1982, where he played baseball only during his senior season, hitting .375 as a right fielder (he played shortstop in his senior league). He was selected by the Texas Rangers in the 39th round of the 1982 Major League Baseball draft and signed for $1,000. He was converted into a pitcher on the strength of his throwing arm and left-handedness. Rogers spent seven years in the minor leagues before making it to the Rangers in 1989 as a reliever. He became a starting pitcher for the club in 1993.

During Rogers' career, he played for the: Texas Rangers (1989–95, 2000–02, 2004–05), New York Yankees (1996–97), Oakland Athletics (1998–99), New York Mets (1999), Minnesota Twins (2003), and Detroit Tigers (2006–08).

Rogers is one of only three pitchers in Rangers history through 2009 to win at least 17 games in 31 starts or fewer (set back in 1995), along with Scott Feldman (2009) and Ferguson Jenkins (18 wins in 30 starts in 1978).

=== Oakland Athletics ===
On November 18, 1997, Rogers was acquired by the Oakland Athletics from the Yankees for third baseman Scott Brosius in Billy Beane's first trade as general manager. Rogers led the Oakland pitching staff in his first season in innings (238.7) and wins (16). The next season, he started 19 games, winning only 5 with a 4.30 ERA. He was traded at the deadline to the New York Mets for Terrence Long and a minor league player.

=== New York Mets ===
Rogers was traded by the Athletics on July 23, 1999, in exchange for Leo Vazquez and Terrence Long. During his short tenure with the team, Rogers started 12 games during the regular season, winning 5 and losing 1, compiling a 4.03 earned run average. Even though he pitched two scoreless innings giving up just one hit in the previous game. He is best remembered in a Mets uniform for walking in the series winning run against the Atlanta Braves in Game 6 of the 1999 NLCS, giving the Braves the win on a walk-off walk. Rogers became a free agent following the 1999 season.

=== Second stint with Rangers ===
After the 1999 season, Rogers signed with the Texas Rangers.

=== Minnesota Twins ===
Rogers signed with the Minnesota Twins in March 2003, filing the rotation slot vacated by an injured Eric Milton. Rogers went 13-8 with a 4.57 ERA during the regular season and made one appearance out of the bullpen in the ALDS against the New York Yankees.

=== Third stint with Rangers ===
Rogers rejoined the Rangers as a free agent in 2004.

On June 29, 2005, after walking out onto Ameriquest Field for a pre-game warmup against the Los Angeles Angels of Anaheim, Rogers shoved two cameramen, knocking one camera to the ground. One of the reporters resumed filming after picking up said camera, which angered Rogers into shoving him again, after grabbing and throwing the camera to the ground, kicking it. He was then led away by a teammate and later sent home by the club. Larry Rodriguez (the assaulted cameraman) of Dallas/Fort Worth Metroplex Fox Network affiliate KDFW was taken to a local hospital, complaining of shoulder, arm and leg pain. While in the hospital, Rodriguez made an official complaint of assault against Rogers.

Two days after the incident, Commissioner Bud Selig suspended Rogers for 20 games and fined him $50,000. While an appeal of his suspension was pending, Rogers appeared at the All-Star Game in Detroit. The suspension was subsequently upheld by Selig. The commissioner was later overruled by independent arbiter Shyam Das, allowing Rogers to return to play after sitting out 13 games. On July 18, 2005, Rogers was charged with a Class A misdemeanor assault charge with regard to Rodriguez and a Class C misdemeanor assault charge with regard to FSN Southwest cameraman David Mammeli. Rogers was cited and released on $1,500 bond. The Class A charge was later reduced to Class C following Rogers' completion of an anger management course.

On August 11, 2005, Rogers returned to the mound against the Boston Red Sox in Fenway Park. Rogers allowed 5 runs and 7 hits during 5 innings, on the way to a 16–5 Boston victory. He finished 2005 with a 3.46 ERA in 195 1/3 innings. Shortly after the regular season ended, the Rangers announced Rogers would not return to the team.

On October 5, 2005, Rodriguez filed a civil suit against Rogers and the Rangers, seeking an unspecified amount of monetary damages.

=== Signing with Detroit ===
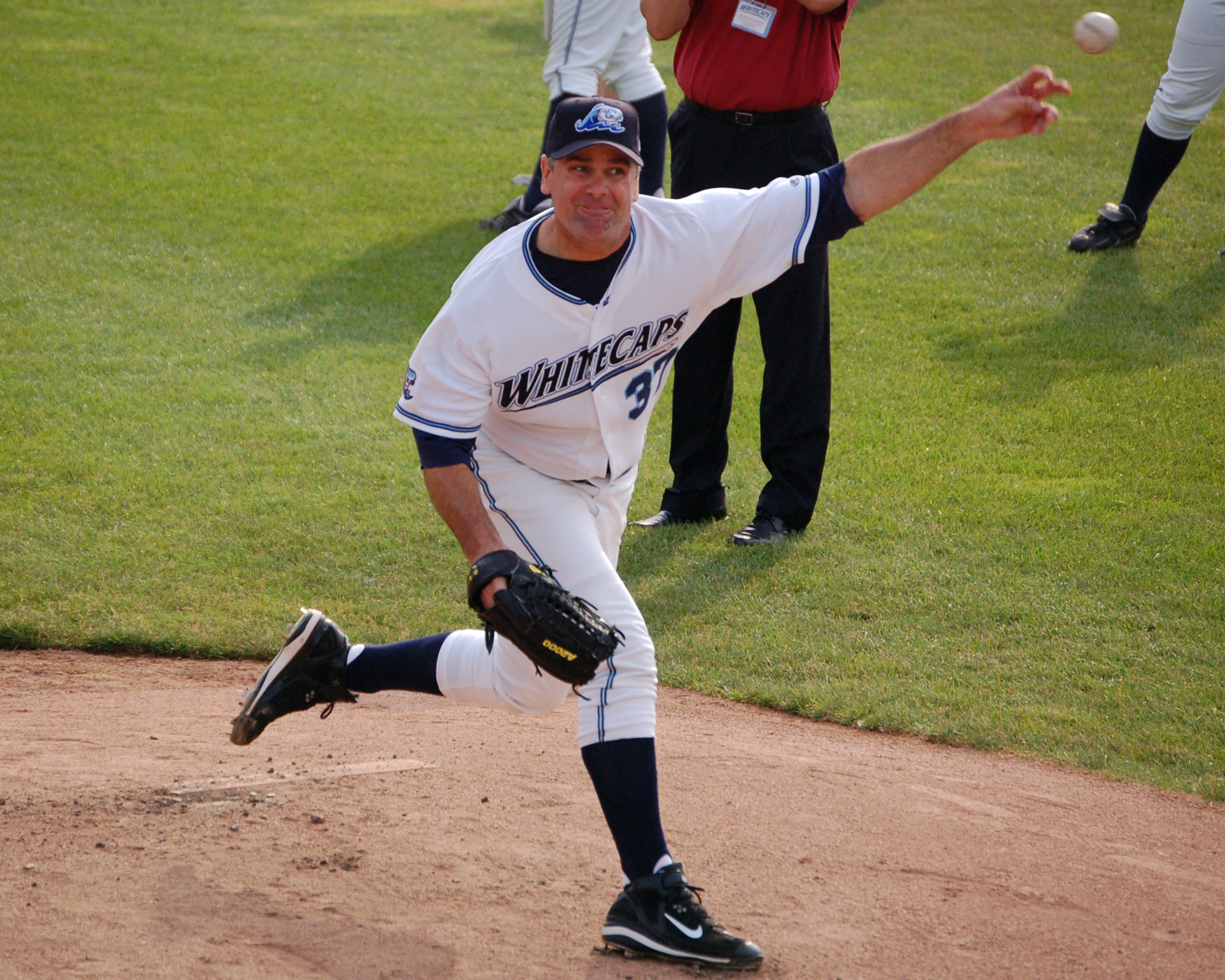
Rogers warming up prior to a rehab start with the West Michigan Whitecaps, Single-A affiliates of the Detroit Tigers in 2007.

On December 8, 2005, Rogers signed a two-year, $16-million contract with the Detroit Tigers. In 2006, he won 17 regular season games and excelled in the post-season with 23 straight scoreless innings over his three starts. Rogers ended the 2006 regular season with a record of 17–8 and a 3.84 ERA. "We've needed a guy like that for a long time. I'm glad we went out and got him...He means a lot to our team and to guys like me," said Tigers starter Jeremy Bonderman on Rogers.

Rogers, on his first year in Detroit: "There's a lot of benefits here, by far, that you wouldn't know as a visiting player, and for me, I've been around quite a while, but I appreciate the town, the city, the people. The travel for a baseball player is very hard, but here it's not that difficult. It lends itself to being able to relax on certain days that you could get off. There's just more benefits, especially when you have the quality of people here like Dombrowski and like we have in Mr. Ilitch, those things that you can't take for granted. You add in Jim Leyland and the coaching staff here, and I just got lucky to choose this place...Right when I went in the door and met them, I knew. I knew where I was going to end up."

On March 30, 2007, ESPN reported that Rogers would miss three months after undergoing surgery for a blood clot in his pitching shoulder. He made his return on June 22 against the Atlanta Braves, pitching six scoreless innings and allowing two hits while earning his first win of the season.

=== 2006 postseason ===
On October 6, 2006, Rogers earned his first postseason win, pitching 7 2/3 scoreless innings with 8 strikeouts in a 6–0 Tigers victory against the Yankees in Game 3 of the American League Division Series. At 41 years and 330 days old, he became the oldest starting pitcher to earn his first career postseason win.

A week later on October 13, Rogers retired 9 batters in a row, in Game 3 of the American League Championship Series against the Oakland Athletics, allowing only 2 hits and 2 walks in 7 1/3 scoreless innings, while striking out 6 and pacing the Tigers to a 3–0 victory, leaving the Tigers 1 win away from their first World Series appearance since 1984.

Rogers started Game 2 of the 2006 World Series on October 22, 2006. "We wanted Kenny to pitch 2 games at home," Leyland said. He left the game with the Tigers in the lead 3–0, pitching 8 shutout innings, retiring 10 straight batters, striking out 5, allowing only 2 hits and 3 walks, making him the oldest starting pitcher to win a World Series game, and 1 of only 2 pitchers over the age of 40 to do so (Curt Schilling would become the second in 2007).

During the first inning, Fox cameras caught a smudge on Rogers' pitching hand. Rogers said it was dirt mixed with rosin from the rosin bag and wiped it off. MLB spokesperson Rich Levin said the incident was investigated, and the substance was described as dirt. Since dirt is not designated as a foreign substance, per Rule 8.02, Rogers remained in the game. In the process, Rogers extended his streak to 23 shutout innings. Examination of images from previous games revealed similar smudges in two other games.

=== Retirement ===
After injuries shortened his 2007 and 2008 seasons, Rogers ceased playing at the end of 2008. With 219 career victories, he became the 7th 200-game winner who never won 20 games in any single season, joining Milt Pappas, Jerry Reuss, Frank Tanana, Charlie Hough, Dennis Martínez and Chuck Finley. Tim Wakefield joined the group with his 200th win in 2011. Mike Mussina reached 200 wins without having a 20-win season, but recorded a 20-win season afterward.

In 2010, Rogers served as a pitching coach for the Detroit Tigers during spring training. According to remarks by Justin Verlander and Jim Leyland, his ability to coach pitchers on fielding would be particularly of interest to the team.

On August 6, 2011, Rogers was enshrined into the Texas Rangers Hall of Fame.

In 2011, Rogers threw out the ceremonial first pitch at Comerica Park in Game 3 of the ALDS.

Rogers reportedly never formally retired from Major League Baseball.

== Accomplishments ==
=== Perfect game ===
Rogers pitched the 14th perfect game in MLB history on July 28, 1994, with the Rangers against the California Angels (the last no-hitter in Rangers history to date, and the only perfect game in franchise history). Soon after his feat, he appeared on ABC's Good Morning America on July 29, 1994, and on CBS's Late Show with David Letterman on August 1, 1994.

He also met and appeared with musician Kenny Rogers at a function in Arlington, Texas, on August 13, 1994. Rogers' 1994 perfect game was caught by Iván Rodríguez, who in June 2007 caught the no-hitter of Roger's future teammate Detroit Tiger Justin Verlander. The game took place exactly three years to the day of the previous perfect game, pitched by Dennis Martínez of the Montreal Expos on July 28, 1991.

=== Gold Gloves ===
Known as one of the finest fielding pitchers in baseball, Rogers won 5 Gold Glove Awards at pitcher, including 4 with the Rangers and 1 with the Tigers. He was honored with a Fielding Bible Award in 2008 as the top fielding pitcher in MLB. Oakland Athletics general manager Billy Beane stated that Rogers "was the best fielding pitcher" he ever saw. "It's like having an extra infielder."

=== 200 career wins ===
On June 18, 2006, Rogers won his 200th game (against the Chicago Cubs at Wrigley Field), during which Detroit set a club record with 8 home runs.

=== Pickoffs ===
Rogers is second all-time in pickoffs with 93 in his career. On May 9, 2008, against the New York Yankees, Rogers picked off Wilson Betemit in the second inning for his 92nd pick-off, passing Mark Langston.

== See also ==
- List of MLB perfect games
- List of MLB career wins leaders
- List of MLB career hit batsmen leaders
- List of MLB career strikeout leaders

Awards and achievements
Preceded by Dennis Martínez	Perfect game pitcher July 28, 1994	Succeeded by David Wells
Preceded by Scott Erickson	No-hitter pitcher July 28, 1994	Succeeded by Ramón Martínez
Preceded by Mark Buehrle	American League All-Star Game Starting Pitcher; 2006	Succeeded by Dan Haren
