= Texas Rangers all-time roster =

List of baseball players

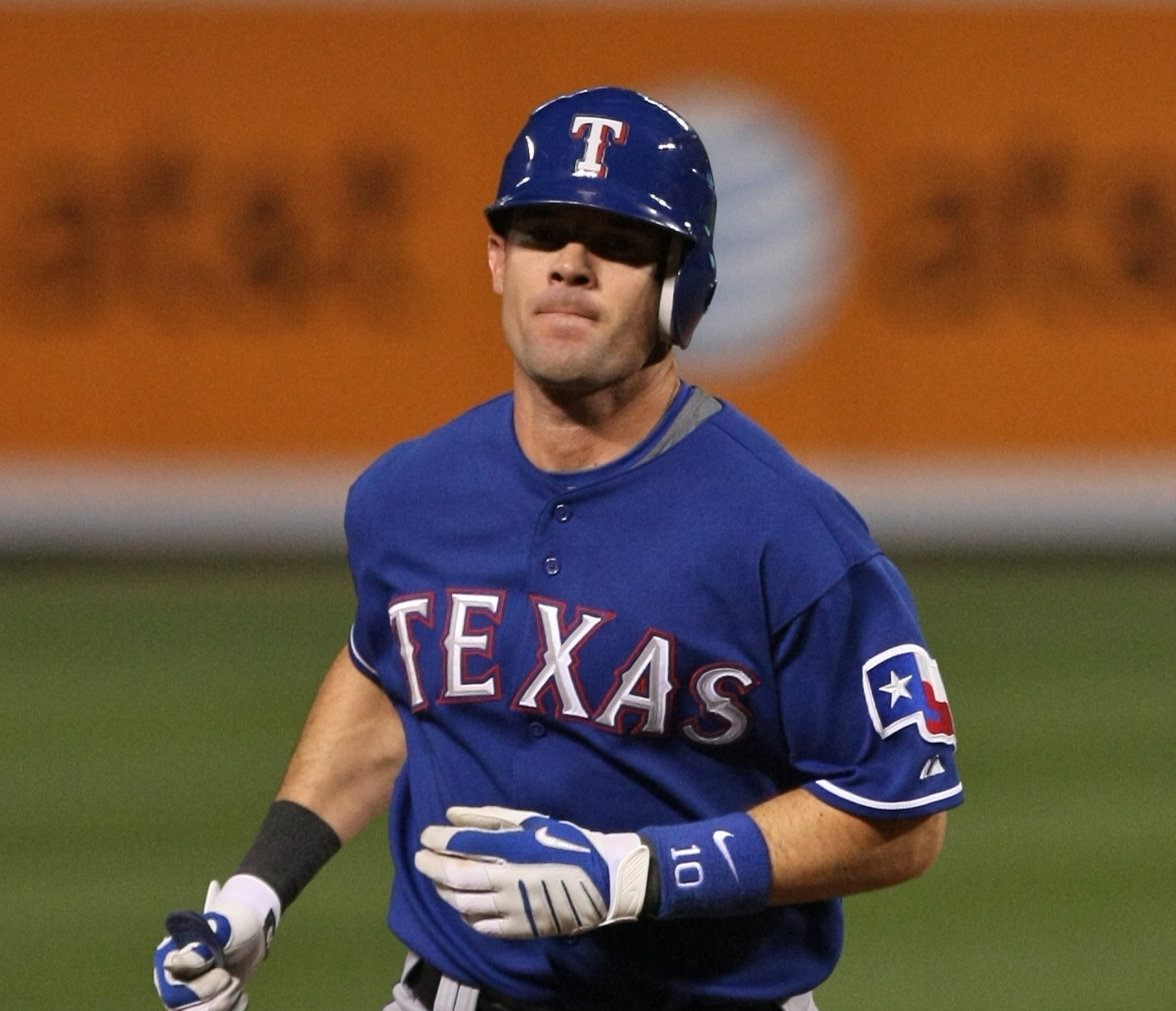
Michael Young played in 1,823 games for the Rangers, more than any other player in team history.

The Texas Rangers Major League Baseball team has played in Arlington, Texas, since 1972. The team began in 1961 as the Washington Senators, an American League expansion team based in Washington, D.C., before relocating to Texas. Since that time, over 1,200 players have competed in at least one game for the Senators/Rangers.

== Key ==
| **Name** | Players in **bold** are members of the National Baseball Hall of Fame. |
| Name | Players in italics have had their numbers retired by the team. |

== A ==
- Albert Abreu
- Mike Adams
- Nate Adcock
- Jim Adduci
- Robby Ahlstrom
- Nick Ahmed
- Darrel Akerfelds
- José Alberro
- Hanser Alberto
- Doyle Alexander
- Gerald Alexander
- Manny Alexander
- Tyler Alexander
- A. J. Alexy
- Antonio Alfonseca
- Luis Alicea
- Brian Allard
- Kolby Allard
- Bernie Allen
- Chad Allen
- Hank Allen
- Lloyd Allen
- Carlos Almanzar
- Sandy Alomar
- Sandy Alomar Jr.
- Darío Álvarez
- Juan Alvarez
- Wilson Álvarez
- Brant Alyea
- Chase Anderson
- Drew Anderson
- Grant Anderson
- Jim Anderson
- Scott Anderson
- Shaun Anderson
- Elvis Andrus
- Sherten Apostel
- Danny Ardoin
- J. P. Arencibia
- Joaquín Árias
- Kohei Arihara
- Jack Armstrong
- Shawn Armstrong
- Brad Arnsberg
- Tucker Ashford
- Pedro Astacio
- Doug Ault

== B ==
- Bob Babcock
- Mike James Bacsik
- Mike Joseph Bacsik
- Scott Bailes
- **Harold Baines**
- Bob Baird
- Jeff Baker
- Scott Baker
- Steve Balboni
- Dave Baldwin
- James Baldwin
- Alan Bannister
- Floyd Bannister
- Rod Barajas
- John Barfield
- Len Barker
- Joe Barlow
- Tony Barnette
- Tucker Barnhart
- Steve Barr
- Anthony Bass
- Randy Bass
- Rick Bauer
- Carter Baumler
- Lew Beasley
- Jalen Beeks
- Kevin Belcher
- Buddy Bell
- Rob Bell
- **Carlos Beltrán**
- **Adrián Beltré**
- Engel Beltré
- Esteban Beltré
- Omar Beltré
- Alan Benes
- Juan Beníquez
- Wes Benjamin
- Joaquín Benoit
- Kris Benson
- Lance Berkman
- Frank Bertaina
- Kurt Bevacqua
- Jim Bibby
- Austin Bibens-Dirkx
- Jesse Biddle
- Nick Bierbrodt
- Larry Biittner
- Dick Billings
- Kyle Bird
- Joe Bitker
- Travis Blackley
- Hank Blalock
- Andrés Blanco
- Kyle Blanks
- Larvell Blanks
- Don Blasingame
- **Bert Blyleven**
- Chet Boak
- Terry Bogener
- Brandon Boggs
- Tommy Boggs
- Brian Bohanon
- Dan Boitano
- Bobby Bonds
- Lisalverto Bonilla
- Julio Borbón
- Thad Bosley
- Dick Bosman
- Jason Botts
- Carl Bouldin
- Caleb Boushley
- Sam Bowens
- Oil Can Boyd
- Cody Bradford
- Milton Bradley
- Mark Brandenburg
- Jeff Brantley
- Marv Breeding
- Jonah Bride
- Marshall Bridges
- Harry Bright
- Nelson Briles
- Ed Brinkman
- Pete Broberg
- Doug Brocail
- Jeff Bronkey
- Jim Bronstad
- Ben Broussard
- Bob Brower
- Adrian Brown
- Jackie Brown
- Kevin Brown
- Kevin L. Brown
- Larry Brown
- Tom Brown
- Jerry Browne
- Cliff Brumbaugh
- Duff Brumley
- Mike Brumley
- Glenn Brummer
- George Brunet
- Billy Bryan
- Kevin Buckley
- Steve Buechele
- Damon Buford
- Ryan Bukvich
- Dave Burba
- Jake Burger
- Brock Burke
- John Burkett
- Cory Burns
- Todd Burns
- Pete Burnside
- Jeff Burroughs
- Terry Burrows
- Dave Bush
- Matt Bush
- John Butcher
- Eddie Butler
- Joey Butler
- Marlon Byrd

== C ==
- Asdrúbal Cabrera
- Greg Cadaret
- Kole Calhoun
- Willie Calhoun
- Mickey Callaway
- Doug Camilli
- Ken Caminiti
- Bert Campaneris
- Mike Campbell
- John Cangelosi
- José Canseco
- Jorge Cantú
- Nick Capra
- Leo Cárdenas
- Cisco Carlos
- Don Carman
- Mike Carp
- Cris Carpenter
- David Carpenter
- Evan Carter
- Rico Carty
- Paul Casanova
- Andrew Cashner
- Don Castle
- Fabio Castro
- Frank Catalanotto
- Cameron Cauley
- José Cecena
- Domingo Cedeño
- Juan Centeno
- Andrew Chafin
- Dave Chalk
- Bob Chance
- Aroldis Chapman
- Endy Chávez
- Jesse Chavez
- Bruce Chen
- Tom Cheney
- Scott Chiamparino
- Robinson Chirinos
- Michael Choice
- Shin-Soo Choo
- Ryan Christenson
- Marc Church
- Preston Claiborne
- Jermaine Clark
- Mark Clark
- Terry Clark
- Will Clark
- Emmanuel Clase
- Alex Claudio
- Ken Clay
- Royce Clayton
- Reggie Cleveland
- Gene Clines
- Al Closter
- David Clyde
- Jim Coates
- Kyle Cody
- Frank Coggins
- Joe Coleman
- Gavin Collyer
- Bartolo Colón
- Cris Colón
- Steve Comer
- Wayne Comer
- Jason Conti
- Dennis Cook
- Glen Cook
- Scott Coolbaugh
- Alex Cora
- Patrick Corbin
- Francisco Cordero
- Bryan Corey
- José Corniell
- Carlos Corporán
- Ed Correa
- Chuck Cottier
- Jharel Cotton
- Neal Cotts
- Danny Coulombe
- Casey Cox
- Larry Cox
- Tim Crabtree
- Pete Craig
- Keith Creel
- Blaine Crim
- Nelson Cruz
- Víctor Cruz
- Mike Cubbage
- Darwin Cubillán
- Bobby Cuellar
- Charlie Culberson
- Tim Cullen
- Joe Cunningham
- Chad Curtis
- Zac Curtis
- Luis Curvelo
- Milt Cuyler

== D ==
- David Dahl
- Pete Daley
- Bennie Daniels
- Yu Darvish
- Danny Darwin
- Doug Dascenzo
- Jack Daugherty
- Butch Davis
- Chris Davis
- Doug R. Davis
- Doug N. Davis
- Khris Davis
- Odie Davis
- Willie Davis
- Brett de Geus
- Jacob DeGrom
- Ed Delahanty
- David Dellucci
- Ryan Dempster
- Bill Denehy
- Bucky Dent
- Mark DeRosa
- Delino DeShields Jr.
- Ian Desmond
- John Dettmer
- Ross Detwiler
- Mike Devereaux
- Adrian Devine
- Alex Diaz
- Einar Díaz
- Elías Díaz
- Joselo Díaz
- Mario Díaz
- Víctor Díaz
- R. A. Dickey
- Jake Diekman
- Derek Dietrich
- Juan Dominguez
- Dick Donovan
- Ryan Dorow
- Dutch Dotterer
- Kyle Dowdy
- Brian Downing
- Kelly Dransfeldt
- Ryan Drese
- Steve Dreyer
- Jim Driscoll
- Rob Ducey
- Justin Duchscherer
- Jim Duckworth
- Matt Duffy
- Steven Duggar
- Jan Dukes
- Tom Dunbar
- Dane Dunning
- Steve Dunning
- Dan Duran
- Ezequiel Durán
- Germán Duran
- Ryne Duren
- Don Durham
- Sam Dyson

== E ==
- Adam Eaton
- Carl Edwards Jr.
- Jon Edwards
- Dock Ellis
- John Ellis
- Robert Ellis
- Jason Ellison
- Kevin Elster
- Nathan Eovaldi
- Cody Eppley
- Mike Epstein
- Scott Erickson
- Paolo Espino
- Cecil Espy
- Demarcus Evans
- Tom Evans
- Carl Everett
- Bryan Eversgerd
- Willie Eyre

== F ==
- Sandro Fabian
- Bill Fahey
- Peter Fairbanks
- Héctor Fajardo
- Rikkert Faneyte
- Monty Fariss
- Ed Farmer
- Jim Farr
- Luke Farrell
- Jeff Fassero
- Andrew Faulkner
- Tim Federowicz
- Ryan Feierabend
- Scott Feldman
- Neftalí Feliz
- Frank Fernández
- Matt Festa
- Tommy Field
- Prince Fielder
- Ed Figueroa
- Pedro Figueroa
- Steve Fireovid
- Doug Fister
- Scott Fletcher
- Curt Flood
- Randy Flores
- Doug Flynn
- Marv Foley
- Mike Foltynewicz
- Wilmer Font
- Ted Ford
- Logan Forsythe
- Justin Foscue
- Tony Fossas
- Kevin Foster
- Steve Foucault
- Andy Fox
- Eric Fox
- Joe Foy
- Frank Francisco
- Julio Franco
- Jeff Francoeur
- Jason Frasor
- Lou Frazier
- Todd Frazier
- Cody Freeman
- Sam Freeman
- Jim Fregosi
- Jim French
- Hanley Frias
- Pepe Frías
- Ernesto Frieri
- Jeff Frye
- Kyuji Fujikawa
- Kazuo Fukumori
- Brad Fullmer
- Aaron Fultz

== G ==
- Kason Gabbard
- John Gabler
- Éric Gagné
- Andrés Galarraga
- Armando Galarraga
- Yovani Gallardo
- Joey Gallo
- Oscar Gamble
- Gerson Garabito
- Bárbaro Garbey
- Adolis García
- Leury García
- Luis García
- Mike Garcia
- Reynaldo Garcia
- Robert Garcia
- Rosman García
- Nick Gardewine
- Ryan Garko
- Mitch Garver
- Matt Garza
- Cory Gearrin
- Dillon Gee
- Craig Gentry
- Estéban Germán
- Franklyn Germán
- Justin Germano
- Ian Gibaut
- Kyle Gibson
- Jim Gideon
- Benji Gil
- Chris Gimenez
- Doug Glanville
- Jerry Don Gleaton
- Ryan Glynn
- Bill Gogolewski
- Greg Golson
- Carlos Gómez
- Jeanmar Gómez
- Marco Gonzales
- Rene Gonzales
- Adrián González
- Alberto González
- Chi Chi Gonzalez
- Juan González
- Miguel González
- Mike Gonzalez
- Tom Goodwin
- Nick Goody
- Greg Goossen
- Brian Gordon
- MacKenzie Gore
- **Rich Gossage**
- Phil Gosselin
- Gary Gray
- Jon Gray
- Peyton Gray
- Dallas Green
- Fred Green
- Gary Green
- Gene Green
- Scarborough Green
- Todd Greene
- Rusty Greer
- Tom Grieve
- A. J. Griffin
- Jason Grilli
- Justin Grimm
- Kevin Gross
- Robbie Grossman
- Johnny Grubb
- Kevin Gryboski
- Joe Grzenda
- Cecilio Guante
- Eddie Guardado
- **Vladimir Guerrero**
- Taylor Guerrieri
- Eric Gunderson
- Cristian Guzmán
- Freddy Guzmán
- José Guzmán
- Ronald Guzmán

== H ==
- Travis Hafner
- Sam Haggerty
- Jerry Hairston Jr.
- Drew Hall
- Mark Hamburger
- Cole Hamels
- Darryl Hamilton
- Josh Hamilton
- Steve Hamilton
- Ken Hamlin
- Rich Hand
- Bill Hands
- Jim Hannan
- Ron Hansen
- Rich Harden
- Shawn Hare
- Steve Hargan
- Mike Hargrove
- Toby Harrah
- Lucas Harrell
- Bud Harrelson
- Ken Harrelson
- Donald Harris
- Dustin Harris
- Greg Harris
- Vic Harris
- Matt Harrison
- Jason Hart
- Mike Hart
- Bill Haselman
- Billy Hatcher
- Mike Hauschild
- Ray Hayward
- Bill Haywood
- Andrew Heaney
- Taylor Hearn
- Austin Hedges
- Jonah Heim
- Scott Heineman
- Roy Heiser
- Woodie Held
- Rick Helling
- Michael Helman
- Ken Henderson
- Tom Henke
- Mike Henneman
- Rick Henninger
- Dwayne Henry
- Gil Heredia
- Wilson Heredia
- Jimmy Herget
- Elier Hernández
- Jonathan Hernández
- José Hernández
- Luis Hernández
- Rudy Hernández
- Xavier Hernandez
- Yonny Hernández
- Codi Heuer
- Joe Hicks
- John Hicks
- Richard Hidalgo
- Kyle Higashioka
- Dennis Higgins
- Derek Hill
- Ken Hill
- Chuck Hinton
- Rich Hinton
- Ed Hobaugh
- Joe Hoerner
- Guy Hoffman
- Bryan Holaday
- Derek Holland
- Greg Holland
- Todd Hollandsworth
- Gary Holle
- Gary Holman
- Brock Holt
- Rick Honeycutt
- Burt Hooton
- John Hoover
- Sam Horn
- Willie Horton
- Dave Hostetler
- Charlie Hough
- Bruce Howard
- Chris Howard
- Frank Howard
- Spencer Howard
- Steve Howe
- Jay Howell
- Roy Howell
- Jared Hoying
- Wei-Chieh Huang
- Mike Hubbard
- Ken Huckaby
- Charlie Hudson
- Sam Huff
- Travis Hughes
- David Hulse
- Bob Humphreys
- Ken Hunt
- Tommy Hunter
- Eric Hurley
- Bruce Hurst
- James Hurst
- Jeff Huson
- Drew Hutchison
- Adam Hyzdu

== I ==
- Andy Ibáñez
- Pete Incaviglia
- Hideki Irabu
- Phil Irwin

== J ==
- Chuck Jackson
- Luke Jackson
- Chris James
- Jerry Janeski
- Travis Jankowski
- Danny Jansen
- Mike Jeffcoat
- Jeremy Jeffress
- **Ferguson Jenkins**
- Jack Jenkins
- Jason Jennings
- Marcus Jensen
- Kevin Jepsen
- A. J. Jiménez
- D'Angelo Jiménez
- Alex Johnson
- Bob E. Johnson
- Bob W. Johnson
- Cliff Johnson
- John Henry Johnson
- Jonathan Johnson
- Lamar Johnson
- **Andruw Jones**
- Bob Jones
- Dalton Jones
- Jason Jones
- Odell Jones
- Steve Jones
- Brian Jordan
- Mike Jorgensen
- Mike Judd
- Josh Jung
- Jakob Junis
- Ariel Jurado

== K ==
- Don Kainer
- Gabe Kapler
- Steve Karsay
- Matt Kata
- Mike Kekich
- Keone Kela
- Jarred Kelenic
- Shawn Kelley
- Carson Kelly
- Merrill Kelly
- Roberto Kelly
- Steve Kemp
- Ian Kennedy
- John Kennedy
- Marty Keough
- Jim Kern
- Dallas Keuchel
- Paul Kilgus
- Isiah Kiner-Falefa
- Hal King
- Jim King
- John King
- Nolan Kingham
- Ian Kinsler
- Willie Kirkland
- Michael Kirkman
- Ed Kirkpatrick
- Billy Klaus
- Phil Klein
- Lou Klimchock
- Ron Kline
- Johnny Klippstein
- Corey Kluber
- Andrew Knizner
- Randy Knorr
- Darold Knowles
- Alan Koch
- Danny Kolb
- Howie Koplitz
- John Koronka
- Kevin Kouzmanoff
- Ben Kozlowski
- Pete Kozma
- Jim Kremmel
- Chad Kreuter
- Frank Kreutzer
- Ted Kubiak
- Jeff Kunkel
- Marty Kutyna

== L ==
- Bob Lacey
- Al Lachowicz
- Joe Lahoud
- Gerald Laird
- Mike Lamb
- Hobie Landrith
- Wyatt Langford
- Steve Lawson
- Jacob Latz
- Rick Leach
- Tim Leary
- José Leclerc
- Ricky Ledée
- Carlos Lee
- Cliff Lee
- Corey Lee
- Manuel Lee
- Craig Lefferts
- Charlie Leibrandt
- Jack Leiter
- Danilo León
- Sandy León
- Don Leppert
- Al Levine
- Dennis Lewallyn
- Colby Lewis
- Jim Leyritz
- Paul Lindblad
- Josh Lindblom
- Dick Lines
- Rick Lisi
- Wes Littleton
- Esteban Loaiza
- Don Lock
- Kameron Loe
- Kenny Lofton
- Kyle Lohse
- Dale Long
- Nicky Lopez
- Michael Lorenzen
- Don Loun
- Joe Lovitto
- Derek Lowe
- Mark Lowe
- Nate Lowe
- John Lowenstein
- Mike Loynd
- Jonathan Lucroy
- Ryan Ludwick
- Sparky Lyle
- Jordan Lyles
- Lance Lynn

== M ==
- Pete Mackanin
- Adam Macko
- Elliott Maddox
- Bill Madlock
- Warner Madrigal
- Héctor Maestri
- Chris Magruder
- Kevin Mahar
- Ron Mahay
- Greg Mahlberg
- Tyler Mahle
- Mickey Mahler
- Pat Mahomes
- Jim Mahoney
- Candy Maldonado
- Bob Malloy
- Brandon Mann
- Ramón Mañón
- Fred Manrique
- Barry Manuel
- Mike Marshall
- Brett Martin
- Chris Martin
- Gene Martin
- Jason Martin
- Leonys Martín
- Dave Martinez
- J. P. Martínez
- Luis Martinez
- Marty Martínez
- Nick Martínez
- John Marzano
- Jim Mason
- Mike Mason
- Nick Masset
- Rubén Mateo
- Terry Mathews
- Carl Mathias
- Mark Mathias
- Doug Mathis
- Jeff Mathis
- Jon Matlack
- Phil Maton
- Gary Matthews Jr.
- Rob Maurer
- Dave May
- Scott May
- Lee Maye
- Nomar Mazara
- Lee Mazzilli
- Joe McCabe
- Larry McCall
- Brandon McCarthy
- Joe McClain
- Kyle McClellan
- Mike McCormick
- Tommy McCraw
- Lance McCullers
- Andrew McCutchen
- Daniel McCutchen
- Jason McDonald
- Marshall McDougall
- Oddibe McDowell
- Roger McDowell
- Russ McGinnis
- Chris McGuiness
- Billy McKinney
- Denny McLain
- Joey McLaughlin
- Mark McLemore
- Ken McMullen
- Craig McMurtry
- Doc Medich
- Dave Meier
- Adam Melhuse
- Kevin Mench
- Román Méndez
- Yohander Méndez
- Luis Mendoza
- Mario Mendoza
- Orlando Mercado
- Henry Mercedes
- Mark Mercer
- Ron Meridith
- Jim Merritt
- Travis Metcalf
- Drew Meyer
- Dan Miceli
- Chris Michalak
- Will Middlebrooks
- Gary Mielke
- Miles Mikolas
- Jim Miles
- Brad Miller
- Eddie Miller
- Shelby Miller
- Tyson Miller
- Kevin Millwood
- Hoby Milner
- Don Mincher
- Mike Minor
- **Minnie Miñoso**
- Paul Mirabella
- Doug Mirabelli
- Dave Moates
- Ron Moeller
- Dale Mohorcic
- Bengie Molina
- Craig Monroe
- Willie Montañez
- Rafael Montero
- Jordan Montgomery
- Eric Moody
- Barry Moore
- Dylan Moore
- Matt Moore
- Tommy Moore
- Mitch Moreland
- Juan Moreno
- Roger Moret
- Mike Morgan
- Guillermo Moscoso
- Tony Mounce
- Jamie Moyer
- Mike Munoz
- David Murphy
- Donnie Murphy
- A. J. Murray
- Calvin Murray
- Dale Murray
- Aaron Myette

== N ==
- Mike Napoli
- Sam Narron
- Buster Narum
- Joe Nathan
- Cal Neeman
- Dave Nelson
- Gene Nelson
- Jeff Nelson
- Dick Nen
- Robb Nen
- Phil Nevin
- Al Newman
- Warren Newson
- Juan Nicasio
- Brett Nicholas
- Chris Nichting
- Brandon Nimmo
- Dustin Nippert
- C. J. Nitkowski
- Ramón Nivar
- Laynce Nix
- Otis Nixon
- Héctor Noesí
- Dick Nold
- Dickie Noles
- Eric Nolte
- Nelson Norman
- Jim Norris
- Edwin Núñez
- Renato Núñez

== O ==
- Pete O'Brien
- Danny O'Connell
- Darren O'Day
- Rougned Odor
- Alexi Ogando
- Ross Ohlendorf
- Logan O'Hoppe
- Miguel Ojeda
- Al Oliver
- Darren Oliver
- Mike Olt
- Tom O'Malley
- Jonathan Ornelas
- John Orsino
- Phil Ortega
- Héctor Ortiz
- Joe Ortiz
- Junior Ortiz
- Luis Ortiz
- Bobo Osborne
- Claude Osteen
- Alejandro Osuna
- Roy Oswalt
- Akinori Otsuka
- Glenn Otto

== P ==
- Tom Paciorek
- Chris Paddack
- Vicente Padilla
- Mike Pagliarulo
- Rafael Palmeiro
- Joe Palumbo
- Dean Palmer
- Jim Panther
- Ken Pape
- Mark Parent
- Chan-ho Park
- Larry Parrish
- Camilo Pascual
- Bob Patterson
- Danny Patterson
- Spencer Patton
- Mike Paul
- Roger Pavlik
- Pedro Payano
- Joc Pederson
- Carlos Peguero
- C. D. Pelham
- Dan Peltier
- Carlos Peña
- Hunter Pence
- Walter Pennington
- Ben Peoples
- Carlos Pérez
- Martín Pérez
- Matt Perisho
- **Gaylord Perry**
- Herbert Perry
- Stan Perzanowski
- DJ Peters
- Cap Peterson
- Fritz Peterson
- Mark Petkovsek
- Geno Petralli
- Gary Pettis
- Dick Phillips
- Jimmy Piersall
- A. J. Pierzynski
- Kevin Pillar
- Stolmy Pimentel
- Horacio Piña
- Kevin Plawecki
- John Poloni
- Sidney Ponson
- Jim Poole
- Tom Poquette
- Aaron Poreda
- Bo Porter
- Darrell Porter
- Jay Powell
- Yohel Pozo
- Bob Priddy
- Jurickson Profar
- Austin Pruitt
- Ron Pruitt
- Greg Pryor
- Luis Pujols
- Pat Putnam

== Q ==
- Cal Quantrill
- Omar Quintanilla
- Art Quirk
- Guillermo Quiróz

== R ==
- Cole Ragans
- Tom Ragland
- Dave Rajsich
- Elizardo Ramírez
- Erasmo Ramirez
- Max Ramírez
- Cesar Ramos
- Mario Ramos
- Pedro Ramos
- Anthony Ranaudo
- Lenny Randle
- Clay Rapada
- Chris Ray
- Gary Redus
- Rick Reed
- Rob Refsnyder
- Nick Regilio
- Rick Reichardt
- Kevin Reimer
- Zach Reks
- Desi Relaford
- Ken Retzer
- Dennys Reyes
- John Rheinecker
- Arthur Rhodes
- Garrett Richards
- Kevin Richardson
- Mike Richardt
- Pete Richert
- Denny Riddleberger
- Steve Ridzik
- Matt Riley
- Alex Ríos
- Billy Ripken
- Ray Rippelmeyer
- Rubén Rivera
- Yadiel Rivera
- Mickey Rivers
- Daniel Robert
- Dave Roberts
- Leon Roberts
- Ryan Roberts
- Dan Robertson
- David Robertson
- Drew Robinson
- Jeff Robinson
- Tom Robson
- John Rocker
- Kumar Rocker
- Alex Rodriguez
- Aurelio Rodríguez
- Guilder Rodríguez
- **Iván Rodríguez**
- Joely Rodríguez
- Ricardo A. Rodríguez
- Ricardo J. Rodríguez
- Rich Rodríguez
- Wandy Rodríguez
- Yerry Rodríguez
- Ed Roebuck
- Kenny Rogers
- Jim Roland
- Jason Romano
- Andrew Romine
- Adam Rosales
- John Roseboro
- Wayne Rosenthal
- Seth Rosin
- Joe Ross
- Robbie Ross
- Tyson Ross
- Michael Roth
- Ben Rowen
- Dave Rozema
- Ryan Rua
- Don Rudolph
- Justin Ruggiano
- Josh Rupe
- Jeff Russell
- John Russell
- **Nolan Ryan**

== S ==
- Donnie Sadler
- Connor Sadzeck
- Marc Sagmoen
- Jarrod Saltalamacchia
- Billy Sample
- Adrian Sampson
- Danny Santana
- Dennis Santana
- Julio Santana
- Víctor Santos
- Winston Santos
- Luis Sardiñas
- Rob Sasser
- Joe Saunders
- Bob Saverine
- Josh Sborz
- Johnny Schaive
- Richie Scheinblum
- Tanner Scheppers
- Max Scherzer
- Calvin Schiraldi
- Bob Schmidt
- Dave Schmidt
- Gerry Schoen
- Mike Schooler
- Donnie Scott
- Tony Scruggs
- Corey Seager
- Rudy Seánez
- Bob Sebra
- Larry See
- David Segui
- Diego Seguí
- Aaron Sele
- Marcus Semien
- Jon Shave
- Scott Sheldon
- Jim Shellenback
- Chris Shelton
- Barry Shetrone
- Brian Shouse
- Sonny Siebert
- Rubén Sierra
- Roy Sievers
- Brian Sikorski
- Chase Silseth
- Dave Silvestri
- Mike Simms
- Duke Sims
- Bill Singer
- Dave Sisler
- Craig Skok
- Bill "Moose" Skowron
- Don Slaught
- Roy Smalley
- J. D. Smart
- Dan Smith
- Dick Smith
- Josh Smith
- Keith Smith
- Will Smith
- Mike Smithson
- Justin Smoak
- Jake Smolinski
- Drew Smyly
- Ryan Snare
- Brad Snyder
- Brandon Snyder
- Nick Snyder
- Eric Soderholm
- Nick Solak
- Donovan Solano
- Joakim Soria
- Alfonso Soriano
- Sammy Sosa
- Geovany Soto
- Alex Speas
- Jim Spencer
- Shane Spencer
- Jeffrey Springs
- Locke St. John
- Matt Stairs
- Jason Standridge
- Don Stanhouse
- Mike Stanley
- Mike Stanton
- Rusty Staub
- Jim Steels
- Bill Stein
- Rick Stelmaszek
- Dave Stenhouse
- Ray Stephens
- Lee Stevens
- R. C. Stevens
- Chris Stewart
- Dave Stewart
- Kurt Stillwell
- Ron Stillwell
- Jeff Stone
- Todd Stottlemyre
- Doug Strange
- Chris Stratton
- Ryan Strausborger
- Pedro Strop
- Ed Stroud
- Drew Stubbs
- Tom Sturdivant
- Tanyon Sturtze
- Ken Suárez
- Dick Such
- Bill Sudakis
- Jim Sundberg
- Rick Surhoff

== T ==
- Greg Tabor
- Frank Tanana
- Willie Tasby
- Yoshinori Tateyama
- Fernando Tatís
- Leody Taveras
- Scott Taylor
- Taylor Teagarden
- Mark Teixeira
- Anderson Tejeda
- Robinson Tejeda
- Michael Tejera
- Anthony Telford
- Tomás Telis
- Rowdy Tellez
- Emiliano Teodo
- Nick Tepesch
- Jeff Terpko
- Curtis Terry
- Mickey Tettleton
- Bob Tewksbury
- Marcus Thames
- Stan Thomas
- Bobby Thompson
- Bubba Thompson
- Danny Thompson
- Justin Thompson
- Mike Thompson
- John Thomson
- Dickie Thon
- Jesús Tinoco
- Dave Tobik
- Mason Tobin
- Carlos Tocci
- Shawn Tolleson
- Wayne Tolleson
- Brett Tomko
- Yorvit Torrealba
- Andrés Torres
- César Tovar
- Matt Treanor
- Chris Tremie
- Jose Trevino
- Ryan Tucker

== U ==
- Koji Uehara
- Jim Umbarger
- Del Unser
- Ugueth Urbina
- José Ureña

== V ==
- Pedro Valdés
- Ismael Valdéz
- Merkin Valdez
- Phillips Valdez
- Ellis Valentine
- Fred Valentine
- Dave Valle
- Todd Van Poppel
- Ed Vande Berg
- DeWayne Vaughn
- Ramón Vázquez
- Coot Veal
- Randy Velarde
- Will Venable
- Mike Venafro
- Logan Verrett
- Zoilo Versalles
- Brandon Villafuerte
- Meibrys Viloria
- Omar Vizquel
- Jack Voigt
- Edinson Vólquez
- Ed Vosberg

== W ==
- Mark Wagner
- Rick Waits
- Duane Walker
- Steele Walker
- Mike Wallace
- Denny Walling
- Jared Walsh
- Danny Walton
- Gary Ward
- John Wasdin
- Claudell Washington
- La Rue Washington
- B. J. Waszgis
- Jacob Webb
- Kip Wells
- Chris Welsh
- Davis Wendzel
- Don Werner
- Don Wert
- Matt West
- John Wetteland
- Bill White
- Eli White
- Owen White
- Len Whitehouse
- Matt Whiteside
- Tom Wilhelmsen
- Brad Wilkerson
- Curtis Wilkerson
- Nick Willhite
- Jerome Williams
- Matt Williams
- Mitch Williams
- Trevor Williams
- Bump Wills
- Paul Wilmet
- Bobby Wilson
- C. J. Wilson
- Josh Wilson
- Steve Wilson
- Cole Winn
- Patrick Wisdom
- Bobby Witt
- Ross Wolf
- Hunter Wood
- Mike Wood
- Steve Woodard
- Hal Woodeshick
- Gene Woodling
- Craig Worthington
- Clyde Wright
- George Wright
- Jamey Wright
- Ricky Wright
- Austin Wynns

== Y ==
- Esteban Yan
- Kirby Yates
- Yang Hyeon-jong
- Ned Yost
- Chris Young
- Eric Young
- Michael Young

== Z ==
- Gregg Zaun
- Todd Zeile
- Don Zimmer
- Jeff Zimmerman
- Bud Zipfel
- Richie Zisk
