= 1982 Texas Rangers season =

1982 Texas Rangers
- League: American League
- Division: West
- Ballpark: Arlington Stadium
- City: Arlington, Texas
- Record: 64–98 (.395)
- Divisional place: 6th
- Owner: Eddie Chiles
- General managers: Eddie Robinson
- Managers: Don Zimmer, Darrell Johnson
- Television: KXAS-TV; 5 Star Cable (Steve Busby, Merle Harmon)
- Radio: WBAP (Eric Nadel, Mark Holtz )

The 1982 Texas Rangers season was the 22nd of the Texas Rangers franchise overall, their 11th in Arlington as the Rangers, and the 11th season at Arlington Stadium. The Rangers finished sixth in the American League West with a record of 64 wins and 98 losses.

== Offseason ==
- December 11, 1981: Jim Kern was traded by the Rangers to the New York Mets for Doug Flynn and Dan Boitano.
- January 12, 1982: Scott Bailes was drafted by the Texas Rangers in the 7th round of the 1982 amateur draft, but did not sign.
- March 26, 1982: Bump Wills was traded by the Rangers to the Chicago Cubs for Paul Mirabella, a player to be named later, and cash. The Cubs completed the trade by sending Paul Semall (minors) to the Rangers on April 21.
- March 31, 1982: Al Oliver was traded by the Rangers to the Montreal Expos for Larry Parrish and Dave Hostetler.

== Regular season ==
- July 10, 1982: Larry Parrish hit his third grand slam of the week for the Rangers.

=== Season standings ===
AL West
Team	W	L	Pct.	GB	Home	Road
California Angels	93	69	.574	—	52‍–‍29	41‍–‍40
Kansas City Royals	90	72	.556	3	56‍–‍25	34‍–‍47
Chicago White Sox	87	75	.537	6	49‍–‍31	38‍–‍44
Seattle Mariners	76	86	.469	17	42‍–‍39	34‍–‍47
Oakland Athletics	68	94	.420	25	36‍–‍45	32‍–‍49
Texas Rangers	64	98	.395	29	38‍–‍43	26‍–‍55
Minnesota Twins	60	102	.370	33	37‍–‍44	23‍–‍58

=== Record vs. opponents ===
1982 American League record Sources:
Team	BAL	BOS	CAL	CWS	CLE	DET	KC	MIL	MIN	NYY	OAK	SEA	TEX	TOR
Baltimore	—	4–9	7–5	5–7	6–7	7–6	4–8	9–4–1	8–4	11–2	7–5	7–5	9–3	10–3
Boston	9–4	—	7–5	4–8	6–7	8–5	6–6	4–9	6–6	7–6	8–4	7–5	10–2	7–6
California	5–7	5–7	—	8–5	8–4	5–7	7–6	6–6	7–6	7–5	9–4	10–3	8–5	8–4
Chicago	7–5	8–4	5–8	—	6–6	9–3	3–10	3–9	7–6	8–4	9–4	6–7	8–5	8–4
Cleveland	7–6	7–6	4–8	6–6	—	6–7	2–10	7–6	8–4	4–9	4–8	9–3	7–5	7–6
Detroit	6–7	5–8	7–5	3–9	7–6	—	6–6	3–10	9–3	8–5	9–3	6–6	8–4	6–7
Kansas City	8–4	6–6	6–7	10–3	10–2	6–6	—	7–5	7–6	5–7	7–6	7–6	7–6	4–8
Milwaukee	4–9–1	9–4	6–6	9–3	6–7	10–3	5–7	—	7–5	8–5	7–5	8–4	7–5	9–4
Minnesota	4–8	6–6	6–7	6–7	4–8	3–9	6–7	5–7	—	2–10	3–10	5–8	5–8	5–7
New York	2–11	6–7	5–7	4–8	9–4	5–8	7–5	5–8	10–2	—	7–5	6–6	7–5	6–7
Oakland	5–7	4–8	4–9	4–9	8–4	3–9	6–7	5–7	10–3	5–7	—	6–7	5–8	3–9
Seattle	5–7	5–7	3–10	7–6	3–9	6–6	6–7	4–8	8–5	6–6	7–6	—	9–4	7–5
Texas	3–9	2–10	5–8	5–8	5–7	4–8	6–7	5–7	8–5	5–7	8–5	4–9	—	4–8
Toronto	3–10	6–7	4–8	4–8	6–7	7–6	8–4	4–9	7–5	7–6	9–3	5–7	8–4	—

=== Notable transactions ===
- April 1, 1982: Nelson Norman was traded by the Rangers to the Pittsburgh Pirates for Víctor Cruz.
- April 1, 1982: Ron Darling and Walt Terrell were traded by the Rangers to the New York Mets for Lee Mazzilli.
- June 7, 1982: Randy Kramer was drafted by the Rangers in the 1st round (10th pick) of the 1982 Major League Baseball draft (secondary phase).
- August 8, 1982: Lee Mazzilli was traded by the Rangers to the New York Yankees for Bucky Dent.

=== Roster ===
1982 Texas Rangers roster
Roster
Pitchers: 54 Dan Boitano; 29 John Butcher; 11 Steve Comer; 44 Danny Darwin; 33 Jim Farr; 35 Tom Henke; 40 Rick Honeycutt; 49 Charlie Hough; 16 Mike Mason; 32 Jon Matlack; 33 Doc Medich; 34 Paul Mirabella; 24 Dave Schmidt; 48 Mike Smithson; 28 Frank Tanana	Catchers: 8 Bob Johnson; 10 Jim Sundberg; 20 Don Werner; Infielders: 35 Randy Bass; 25 Buddy Bell; 7 Bucky Dent; 21 Doug Flynn; 12 Dave Hostetler; 14 Mario Mendoza; 18 Pat Putnam; 2 Mike Richardt; 1 Bill Stein; 3 Wayne Tolleson; 30 Mark Wagner	Outfielders: 38 Terry Bogener; 4 Nick Capra; 6 Johnny Grubb; 16 Lee Mazzilli; 23 Pete O'Brien; 9 Larry Parrish; 7 Leon Roberts; 5 Billy Sample; 26 George Wright; Other batters: 27 Lamar Johnson; 17 Mickey Rivers	Manager: 22 Darrell Johnson; 23 Don Zimmer; Coaches: 41 Jackie Brown; 19 Tommy Helms; 22 Darrell Johnson; 47 Fred Koenig; 42 Wayne Terwilliger

== Player stats ==
=== Batting ===
==== Starters by position ====
Note: Pos = Position; G = Games played; AB = At bats; H = Hits; Avg. = Batting average; HR = Home runs; RBI = Runs batted in

Pos	Player	G	AB	H	Avg.	HR	RBI
C	Jim Sundberg	139	470	118	.251	10	47
1B	Dave Hostetler	113	418	97	.232	22	67
2B	Mike Richardt	119	402	97	.241	3	43
SS	Mark Wagner	60	179	43	.240	0	8
3B	Buddy Bell	148	537	159	.296	13	67
LF	Billy Sample	97	360	94	.261	10	29
CF	George Wright	150	557	147	.264	11	50
RF	Larry Parrish	128	440	116	.264	17	62
DH	Lamar Johnson	105	324	84	.259	7	38

==== Other batters ====
Note: G = Games played; AB = At bats; H = Hits; Avg. = Batting average; HR = Home runs; RBI = Runs batted in

Player	G	AB	H	Avg.	HR	RBI
Johnny Grubb	103	308	86	.279	3	26
Doug Flynn	88	270	57	.211	0	19
Lee Mazzilli	58	195	47	.241	4	17
Bill Stein	85	184	44	.239	1	16
Bucky Dent	46	146	32	.219	1	14
Pat Putnam	43	122	28	.230	2	9
Leon Roberts	31	73	17	.233	1	6
Wayne Tolleson	38	70	8	.114	0	2
Mickey Rivers	19	68	16	.235	1	4
Pete O'Brien	20	67	16	.239	4	13
Terry Bogener	24	60	13	.217	1	4
Don Werner	22	59	12	.203	0	3
Bob Johnson	20	56	7	.125	2	7
Randy Bass	16	48	10	.208	1	6
Mario Mendoza	12	17	2	.118	0	0
Nick Capra	13	15	4	.267	1	1

=== Pitching ===
==== Starting pitchers ====
Note: G = Games pitched; IP = Innings pitched; W = Wins; L = Losses; ERA = Earned run average; SO = Strikeouts

Player	G	IP	W	L	ERA	SO
Charlie Hough	34	228.0	16	13	3.95	128
Frank Tanana	30	194.1	7	18	4.21	87
Rick Honeycutt	30	164.0	5	17	5.27	64
Doc Medich	21	122.2	7	11	5.06	37
John Butcher	18	94.1	1	5	4.87	39
Mike Smithson	8	46.2	3	4	5.01	24
Mike Mason	4	23.0	1	2	5.09	8

==== Other pitchers ====
Note: G = Games pitched; IP = Innings pitched; W = Wins; L = Losses; ERA = Earned run average; SO = Strikeouts

Player	G	IP	W	L	ERA	SO
Jon Matlack	33	147.2	7	7	3.53	78
Dave Schmidt	33	109.2	4	6	3.20	69

==== Relief pitchers ====
Note: G = Games pitched; W = Wins; L = Losses; SV = Saves; ERA = Earned run average; SO = Strikeouts

Player	G	W	L	SV	ERA	SO
Danny Darwin	56	10	8	7	3.44	61
Paul Mirabella	40	1	1	3	4.80	29
Steve Comer	37	1	6	6	5.10	23
Dan Boitano	19	0	0	0	5.34	28
Tom Henke	8	1	0	0	1.15	9
Jim Farr	5	0	0	0	2.50	6

=== Awards and honors ===
- Buddy Bell, 3B, Gold Glove 1982

All-Star Game

== Farm system ==
Level	Team	League	Manager
AAA	Denver Bears	American Association	Rich Donnelly
AA	Tulsa Drillers	Texas League	Tom Burgess
A	Burlington Rangers	Midwest League	Marty Scott
Rookie	GCL Rangers	Gulf Coast League	Tom Grieve

LEAGUE CHAMPIONS: Tulsa
