= 1983 Texas Rangers season =

1983 Texas Rangers
- League: American League
- Division: West
- Ballpark: Arlington Stadium
- City: Arlington, Texas
- Owners: Eddie Chiles
- General managers: Joe Klein
- Managers: Doug Rader
- Television: KXAS-TV (Steve Busby, Merle Harmon)
- Radio: WBAP (Eric Nadel, Mark Holtz)

The 1983 Texas Rangers season was the 23rd of the Texas Rangers franchise overall, their 12th in Arlington as the Rangers, and the 12th season at Arlington Stadium. The Rangers finished third in the American League West with a record of 77 wins and 85 losses. The Rangers did break a Major League Baseball record for the most runs ever scored by one team during a single extra inning.

== Regular season ==
=== Season standings ===
AL West
| Team | W | L | Pct. | GB | Home | Road |
|---|---|---|---|---|---|---|
| Chicago White Sox | 99 | 63 | .611 | — | 55‍–‍26 | 44‍–‍37 |
| Kansas City Royals | 79 | 83 | .488 | 20 | 45‍–‍36 | 34‍–‍47 |
| Texas Rangers | 77 | 85 | .475 | 22 | 44‍–‍37 | 33‍–‍48 |
| Oakland Athletics | 74 | 88 | .457 | 25 | 42‍–‍39 | 32‍–‍49 |
| California Angels | 70 | 92 | .432 | 29 | 35‍–‍46 | 35‍–‍46 |
| Minnesota Twins | 70 | 92 | .432 | 29 | 37‍–‍44 | 33‍–‍48 |
| Seattle Mariners | 60 | 102 | .370 | 39 | 30‍–‍51 | 30‍–‍51 |

=== Record vs. opponents ===
1983 American League record Sources:
| Team | BAL | BOS | CAL | CWS | CLE | DET | KC | MIL | MIN | NYY | OAK | SEA | TEX | TOR |
|---|---|---|---|---|---|---|---|---|---|---|---|---|---|---|
| Baltimore | — | 8–5 | 7–5 | 7–5 | 6–7 | 5–8 | 8–4 | 11–2 | 8–4 | 6–7 | 8–4 | 8–4 | 9–3 | 7–6 |
| Boston | 5–8 | — | 6–6 | 6–6 | 7–6 | 4–9 | 5–7 | 4–9 | 5–7 | 7–6 | 8–4 | 7–5 | 7–5 | 7–6 |
| California | 5–7 | 6–6 | — | 3–10 | 8–4 | 4–8 | 6–7 | 6–6 | 6–7 | 5–7 | 5–8 | 6–7 | 6–7 | 4–8 |
| Chicago | 5–7 | 6–6 | 10–3 | — | 8–4 | 8–4 | 9–4 | 4–8 | 8–5 | 8–4 | 8–5 | 12–1 | 8–5 | 5–7 |
| Cleveland | 7–6 | 6–7 | 4–8 | 4–8 | — | 5–8 | 7–5 | 3–10 | 6–6 | 6–7 | 7–5 | 8–4 | 3–9 | 4–9 |
| Detroit | 8–5 | 9–4 | 8–4 | 4–8 | 8–5 | — | 7–5 | 6–7 | 9–3 | 5–8 | 6–6 | 8–4 | 8–4 | 6–7 |
| Kansas City | 4–8 | 7–5 | 7–6 | 4–9 | 5–7 | 5–7 | — | 6–6 | 6–7 | 6–6 | 7–6 | 8–5 | 8–5–1 | 6–6 |
| Milwaukee | 2–11 | 9–4 | 6–6 | 8–4 | 10–3 | 7–6 | 6–6 | — | 8–4 | 4–9 | 6–6 | 5–7 | 8–4 | 8–5 |
| Minnesota | 4–8 | 7–5 | 7–6 | 5–8 | 6–6 | 3–9 | 7–6 | 4–8 | — | 4–8 | 4–9 | 9–4 | 5–8 | 5–7 |
| New York | 7–6 | 6–7 | 7–5 | 4–8 | 7–6 | 8–5 | 6–6 | 9–4 | 8–4 | — | 8–4 | 7–5 | 7–5 | 7–6 |
| Oakland | 4–8 | 4–8 | 8–5 | 5–8 | 5–7 | 6–6 | 6–7 | 6–6 | 9–4 | 4–8 | — | 9–4 | 2–11 | 6–6 |
| Seattle | 4–8 | 5–7 | 7–6 | 1–12 | 4–8 | 4–8 | 5–8 | 7–5 | 4–9 | 5–7 | 4–9 | — | 6–7 | 4–8 |
| Texas | 3–9 | 5–7 | 7–6 | 5–8 | 9–3 | 4–8 | 5–8–1 | 4–8 | 8–5 | 5–7 | 11–2 | 7–6 | — | 4–8 |
| Toronto | 6–7 | 6–7 | 8–4 | 7–5 | 9–4 | 7–6 | 6–6 | 5–8 | 7–5 | 6–7 | 6–6 | 8–4 | 8–4 | — |

=== Opening Day starters ===
- Buddy Bell
- Bucky Dent
- Dave Hostetler
- Pete O'Brien
- Larry Parrish
- Mike Richardt
- Billy Sample
- Mike Smithson
- Jim Sundberg
- George Wright

=== Notable transactions ===
- August 19, 1983: Rick Honeycutt was traded by the Rangers to the Los Angeles Dodgers for Dave Stewart, a player to be named later and $200,000. The Dodgers completed by sending Ricky Wright to the Rangers on September 16.

=== Roster ===
1983 Texas Rangers roster
Roster
| Pitchers: 29 John Butcher; 23 Víctor Cruz; 44 Danny Darwin; 35 Tom Henke; 40 Rick Honeycutt; 49 Charlie Hough; 21 Odell Jones; 51 Al Lachowicz; 16 Mike Mason; 32 Jon Matlack; 24 Dave Schmidt; 48 Mike Smithson; 31 Dave Stewart; 28 Frank Tanana; 41 Dave Tobik; 38 Ricky Wright | Catchers: 8 Bob Johnson; 43 Donnie Scott; 10 Jim Sundberg; Infielders: 46 Jim Anderson; 25 Buddy Bell; 14 Larry Biittner; 7 Bucky Dent; 9 Pete O'Brien; 2 Mike Richardt; 1 Bill Stein; 3 Wayne Tolleson; 30 Mark Wagner; 19 Curtis Wilkerson | Outfielders: 4 Nick Capra; 13 Tom Dunbar; 6 Bobby Jones; 15 Larry Parrish; 5 Billy Sample; 26 George Wright; Other batters: 12 Dave Hostetler; 17 Mickey Rivers | Manager: 11 Doug Rader; Coaches: 37 Rich Donnelly; 23 Glenn Ezell; 22 Merv Rettenmund; 52 Dick Such; 42 Wayne Terwilliger |

== Player stats ==
=== Batting ===
==== Starters by position ====
Note: Pos = Position; G = Games played; AB = At bats; H = Hits; Avg. = Batting average; HR = Home runs; RBI = Runs batted in

| Pos | Player | G | AB | H | Avg. | HR | RBI |
|---|---|---|---|---|---|---|---|
| C | Jim Sundberg | 131 | 378 | 76 | .201 | 2 | 28 |
| 1B | Pete O'Brien | 154 | 524 | 124 | .237 | 8 | 53 |
| 2B | Wayne Tolleson | 134 | 470 | 122 | .260 | 3 | 20 |
| 3B | Buddy Bell | 156 | 618 | 171 | .277 | 14 | 66 |
| SS | Bucky Dent | 131 | 417 | 99 | .237 | 2 | 34 |
| LF | Billy Sample | 147 | 554 | 152 | .274 | 12 | 57 |
| CF | George Wright | 162 | 634 | 175 | .276 | 18 | 80 |
| RF | Larry Parrish | 145 | 555 | 151 | .272 | 26 | 88 |
| DH | Dave Hostetler | 94 | 304 | 67 | .220 | 11 | 46 |

==== Other batters ====
Note: G = Games played; AB = At bats; H = Hits; Avg. = Batting average; HR = Home runs; RBI = Runs batted in

| Player | G | AB | H | Avg. | HR | RBI |
|---|---|---|---|---|---|---|
| Mickey Rivers | 96 | 309 | 88 | .285 | 1 | 20 |
| Bill Stein | 78 | 232 | 72 | .310 | 2 | 33 |
| Bob Johnson | 72 | 175 | 37 | .211 | 5 | 16 |
| Larry Biitner | 66 | 116 | 32 | .276 | 0 | 18 |
| Jim Anderson | 50 | 102 | 22 | .216 | 0 | 6 |
| Mike Richardt | 22 | 83 | 13 | .157 | 1 | 7 |
| Bobby Jones | 41 | 72 | 16 | .222 | 1 | 11 |
| Curt Wilkerson | 16 | 35 | 6 | .171 | 0 | 1 |
| Tom Dunbar | 12 | 24 | 6 | .250 | 0 | 3 |
| Donnie Scott | 2 | 4 | 0 | .000 | 0 | 0 |
| Mark Wagner | 2 | 2 | 0 | .000 | 0 | 0 |
| Nick Capra | 8 | 2 | 0 | .000 | 0 | 0 |

=== Pitching ===
==== Starting pitchers ====
Note: G = Games pitched; IP = Innings pitched; W = Wins; L = Losses; ERA = Earned run average; SO = Strikeouts

| Player | G | IP | W | L | ERA | SO |
|---|---|---|---|---|---|---|
| Charlie Hough | 34 | 252.0 | 15 | 13 | 3.18 | 152 |
| Mike Smithson | 33 | 223.1 | 10 | 14 | 3.91 | 135 |
| Danny Darwin | 28 | 183.0 | 8 | 13 | 3.49 | 92 |
| Rick Honeycutt | 25 | 174.2 | 14 | 8 | 2.42 | 56 |
| Frank Tanana | 29 | 159.1 | 7 | 9 | 3.16 | 108 |
| Dave Stewart | 8 | 59.0 | 5 | 2 | 2.14 | 24 |

==== Other pitchers ====
Note: G = Games pitched; IP = Innings pitched; W = Wins; L = Losses; ERA = Earned run average; SO = Strikeouts

| Player | G | IP | W | L | ERA | SO |
|---|---|---|---|---|---|---|
| John Butcher | 38 | 123.0 | 6 | 6 | 3.51 | 58 |
| Jon Matlack | 25 | 73.1 | 2 | 4 | 4.66 | 38 |
| Al Lachowicz | 2 | 8.0 | 0 | 1 | 2.25 | 8 |

==== Relief pitchers ====
Note: G = Games pitched; W = Wins; L = Losses; SV = Saves; ERA = Earned run average; SO = Strikeouts

| Player | G | W | L | SV | ERA | SO |
|---|---|---|---|---|---|---|
| Odell Jones | 42 | 3 | 6 | 10 | 3.09 | 50 |
| Dave Schmidt | 31 | 3 | 3 | 2 | 3.88 | 29 |
| Dave Tobik | 27 | 2 | 1 | 9 | 3.68 | 30 |
| Víctor Cruz | 17 | 1 | 3 | 5 | 1.44 | 18 |
| Tom Henke | 8 | 1 | 0 | 1 | 3.38 | 17 |
| Mike Mason | 5 | 0 | 2 | 0 | 5.91 | 9 |
| Ricky Wright | 1 | 0 | 0 | 0 | 0.00 | 2 |

== Awards and honors ==
- Buddy Bell, 3B, Gold Glove 1983

All-Star Game

=== Team leaders ===
- Larry Parrish, Home Runs, 26
- Larry Parrish, RBI, 88
- Billy Sample, Runs, 80
- Billy Sample, Stolen bases, 44
- Buddy Bell, Batting average, .277
- George Wright, Hits, 175

== Farm system ==
| Level | Team | League | Manager |
|---|---|---|---|
| AAA | Oklahoma City 89ers | American Association | Tom Burgess |
| AA | Tulsa Drillers | Texas League | Marty Scott |
| A | Burlington Rangers | Midwest League | Orlando Gómez |
| A-Short Season | Tri-City Triplets | Northwest League | Dave Oliver |
| Rookie | GCL Rangers | Gulf Coast League | Andy Hancock |

== Notable events ==
- July 3 — The Rangers score twelve runs in the fifteenth inning to defeat the Oakland Athletics 16–4, in the process breaking the MLB record for most runs scored during one single extra inning, previously held by the 1928 New York Yankees.
