= Joe McEwing =

American baseball player and coach (born 1972)

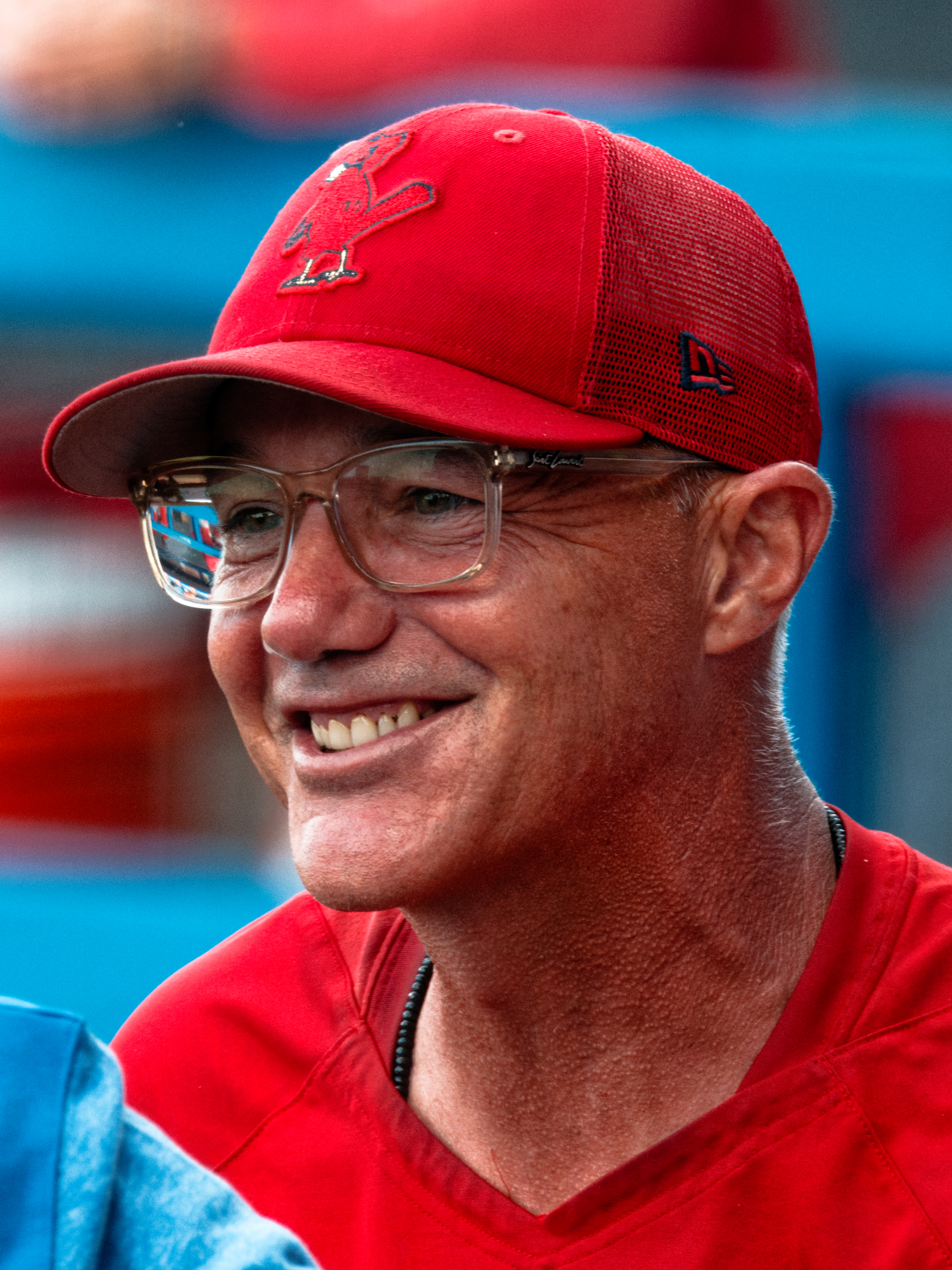
- McEwing with the Cardinals in 2023
- Utility player / Coach
- Born: October 19, 1972 (age 54); Bristol, Pennsylvania, U.S.
- Batted: Right Threw: Right

MLB debut
- September 2, 1998, for the St. Louis Cardinals

Last MLB appearance
- May 20, 2006, for the Houston Astros

MLB statistics
- Batting average: .251
- Home runs: 25
- Runs batted in: 158
- Stats at Baseball Reference

Teams
- As player: St. Louis Cardinals (1998–1999); New York Mets (2000–2004); Kansas City Royals (2005); Houston Astros (2006); As coach: Chicago White Sox (2012–2022); St. Louis Cardinals (2023)

Joseph Earl McEwing (born October 19, 1972) is an American professional baseball coach and former utility player. He played in Major League Baseball (MLB) for the St. Louis Cardinals, New York Mets, Kansas City Royals, and Houston Astros, and coached for the Chicago White Sox and Cardinals. Nicknamed "Super Joe", he was the prototypical utility player who could play any position on the field.

== Early life ==
McEwing graduated from Bishop Egan High School in Fairless Hills, Pennsylvania, in 1990. While in high school, he played for both the basketball and baseball teams. He played college baseball at the County College of Morris in Randolph Township, New Jersey. During the 1991 season, he set a school record for single-season batting average, hitting .465. In 2001, the college retired his uniform number, #6.

== Professional baseball career ==
In 1998, he had a total of 51 doubles with Triple-A Memphis and Double-A Arkansas. His first full season in the majors was also his best. McEwing batted .275 in 1999 with 141 hits and a career-high nine home runs. He also amassed a 25-game hitting streak, the fifth longest at that time by a rookie, and finished fifth in National League Rookie of the Year balloting.

McEwing became an immediate fan favorite because of his energy, hustle, and obvious love for the game. His nickname, Super Joe, referred to McEwing's positional versatility. During his rookie season, McEwing played every position on the field, except pitcher and catcher.

In his honor, St. Louis Cardinals fans created what was known as "Little Mac Land," in a play on words of the official "Big Mac Land" created in the upper deck of Busch Stadium for Mark McGwire. McEwing had a streak of 230 errorless games, which at one point was the longest such streak by an active major league outfielder. McEwing was often successful against Randy Johnson, so McEwing was nicknamed "Little Unit" (a reference to Johnson who was called "Big Unit").

During Spring training just before the start of the 2000 season, he was traded to the New York Mets for Jesse Orosco. Cardinals manager Tony LaRussa admired McEwing so much that he requested a pair of the player's spikes upon the trade.

Released by the Mets toward the end of spring training in 2005 (which especially upset All-Star David Wright), the Kansas City Royals signed him to provide extra infield insurance. The Royals called McEwing up to the major leagues in April, when starting third baseman Mark Teahen went on the 15-day disabled list.

On March 30, 2006, he was sent to the Houston Astros by the Royals. In 2007, he signed a minor league contract with the Boston Red Sox. On January 16, 2008, McEwing officially announced his retirement from baseball.

== Post-playing career ==
=== Chicago White Sox ===
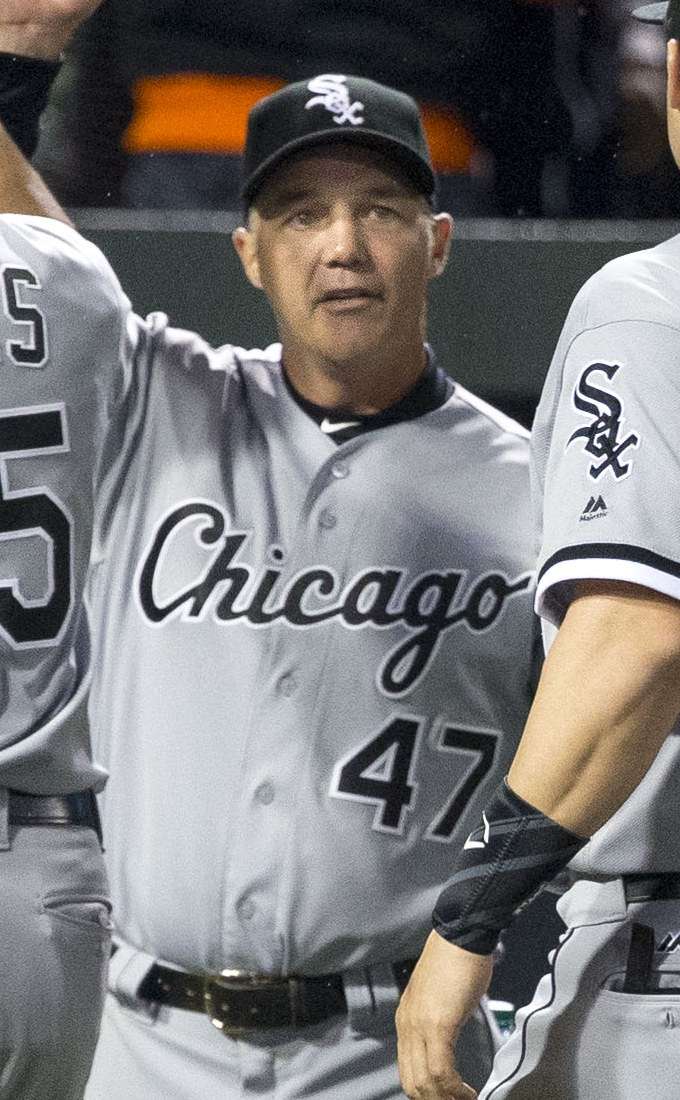
McEwing as a coach for the Chicago White Sox in 2016

In the 2008 season, McEwing started his baseball coaching career as the hitting coach for the Charlotte Knights. On November 3, 2008, he was named manager of the Winston-Salem Dash, the Class A affiliate for the Chicago White Sox, for the 2009 season. During that season, Baseball America rated McEwing as the top managerial prospect in the South Atlantic League. McEwing was also named Manager of the Year for his work managing the Dash in 2009 and 2010.

McEwing was named manager of the Charlotte Knights, the White Sox Triple-A affiliate, for the 2011 season. In October 2011, McEwing was promoted to serve as the third base coach for the White Sox in 2012, serving under new manager Robin Ventura. Several managerial and coaching positions opened up shortly before the end of the 2011 season when then White Sox manager Ozzie Guillén announced that he would be leaving. McEwing was promoted from third base coach to bench coach for the 2017 season and continued to occupy that job until 2020 when the White Sox hired Miguel Cairo. On December 1, 2020, McEwing was named third base coach.

=== St. Louis Cardinals ===
On January 12, 2023, McEwing was hired by the St. Louis Cardinals as their bench coach. McEwing was ejected for the first time in his MLB career on May 5, arguing a called strike one to Dylan Carlson. Cardinals manager Oliver Marmol was ejected as well. On November 20, the Cardinals announced he would move into a role as a special assistant to John Mozeliak, the Cardinals' then-president of baseball operations, as Daniel Descalso would become the new bench coach.

On October 19, 2025, McEwing and the Cardinals agreed to mutually part ways.

== Personal life ==
McEwing, his wife Courtnie, and their family reside outside of Philadelphia.

Sporting positions
Preceded by Jeff Cox; Nick Capra	Chicago White Sox third base coach 2012-2016; 2021–2022	Succeeded by Nick Capra; Eddie Rodriguez
Preceded by Rick Renteria	Chicago White Sox bench coach 2017–2020	Succeeded by Miguel Cairo
Preceded by Skip Schumaker	St. Louis Cardinals bench coach 2023–present	Succeeded by Incumbent
