= Ricky Wright (baseball) =

American baseball player (born 1958)

- Pitcher
- Born: November 22, 1958 (age 66); Paris, Texas, U.S.
- Batted: Left Threw: Left

MLB debut
- July 28, 1982, for the Los Angeles Dodgers

Last MLB appearance
- August 5, 1986, for the Texas Rangers

MLB statistics
- Win–loss record: 3-3
- Earned run average: 4.30
- Strikeouts: 67
- Stats at Baseball Reference

Teams
- Los Angeles Dodgers (1982–1983); Texas Rangers (1983–1986)

James Richard Wright (born November 22, 1958) is a former professional baseball pitcher. He pitched parts of five seasons in Major League Baseball (MLB).

Wright made his MLB debut for the Los Angeles Dodgers on July 28, 1982. In August 1983, the Dodgers traded Wright and Dave Stewart to the Texas Rangers for Rick Honeycutt. Wright pitched for the Rangers through 1986.
