= Jim Farr =

American baseball player (born 1956)

- Pitcher
- Born: May 18, 1956 (age 70); Waverly, New York, U.S.
- Batted: Right Threw: Right

MLB debut
- September 7, 1982, for the Texas Rangers

Last MLB appearance
- October 3, 1982, for the Texas Rangers

MLB statistics
- Earned run average: 2.50
- Record: 0-0
- Strikeouts: 6
- Stats at Baseball Reference

Teams
- Texas Rangers (1982)

James Alfred Farr (born Friday, May 18, 1956) is an American former Major League Baseball pitcher who played for the Texas Rangers in 1982.

== Amateur career ==
A native of Waverly, New York, Farr attended Penn State University. In 1976 and 1977, he played collegiate summer baseball with the Wareham Gatemen of the Cape Cod Baseball League.

== Professional career ==
Farr was drafted three times before signing with a team. In 1974, the Chicago White Sox selected him in the ninth round of the June Regular Phase amateur entry draft. In 1977, the San Francisco Giants took him in the 15th round of the June Regular Phase amateur entry draft. Finally, in 1978, the Texas Rangers took him in the 29th round of the June Regular Phase amateur entry draft.

On September 7, 1982, Farr made his major league debut. He appeared in a total of five games in the 1982 season, pitching a total of 18 innings and with an ERA of 2.50. In those 18 innings pitched, Farr threw one wild pitch, walked seven, and struck out only six.

Less than one month after his debut, on October 3, 1982, Farr pitched his final Major League game.

== Coaching career ==
After ending his playing career, Farr coached at the College of William and Mary and compiled a record of 373-310-2 in 13 seasons. While at William and Mary in 1996, Farr was accused by two former players of being racist and violent towards one player.
