= Mike Richardt =

American baseball player (born 1958)

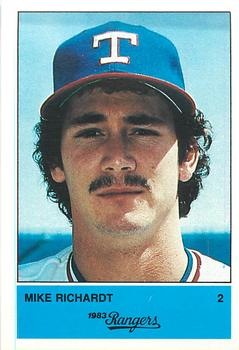
- Second baseman
- Born: May 24, 1958 (age 68); North Hollywood, California, U.S.
- Batted: Right Threw: Right

MLB debut
- August 30, 1980, for the Texas Rangers

Last MLB appearance
- September 30, 1984, for the Houston Astros

MLB statistics
- Batting average: .226
- Home runs: 4
- Runs batted in: 60
- Stats at Baseball Reference

Teams
- Texas Rangers (1980, 1982–1984); Houston Astros (1984)

Michael Anthony Richardt (born May 24, 1958) is an American former professional baseball second baseman. He played all or part of four seasons in Major League Baseball (MLB), between 1980 and 1984, mostly for the Texas Rangers. He also played in 16 games for the Houston Astros at the end of the 1984 season. He threw and batted right-handed and was listed as 6 feet (1.8 m) tall and 170 pounds (77 kg).

After a brief trial in 1980, Richardt spent the entire 1981 season in the minor leagues with the Wichita Aeros. There, he led the American Association in batting average at .354. That performance earned him a spot on the Rangers' opening day roster as their starting designated hitter in 1982. After a return trip to the minor leagues in May, he returned to the majors and spent the last four months of the season as the Rangers' regular second baseman. That year, he batted .241 in 119 games, hitting 3 of his 4 career home runs while driving in 43 runs. He also stole 9 bases in 10 attempts.

Richardt started the 1983 season in the same position, but had some problems that season. He got into a fistfight with teammate Mickey Rivers on a plane trip home and by the end of April he was batting just .194. Eventually, he was replaced in the lineup by Wayne Tolleson. Richardt returned to the minor leagues, and received only a few more brief trials over the remainder of the season and in 1984. In May 1984, he was traded to the Astros for Alan Bannister.

Starting 1985 in the minors, Richardt played just 13 games that season, and then was out of organized baseball for two full years. He attempted a comeback in 1988 with the independent Fresno Suns of the California League, and played well enough to get a minor league deal with the Rangers. After playing 28 games for the Tulsa Drillers, however, he was out of baseball for good.

== Sources ==
- Career statistics from Baseball Reference · Baseball Reference (Minors) · Retrosheet · Baseball Almanac
