= Don Werner =

American baseball player (born 1953)

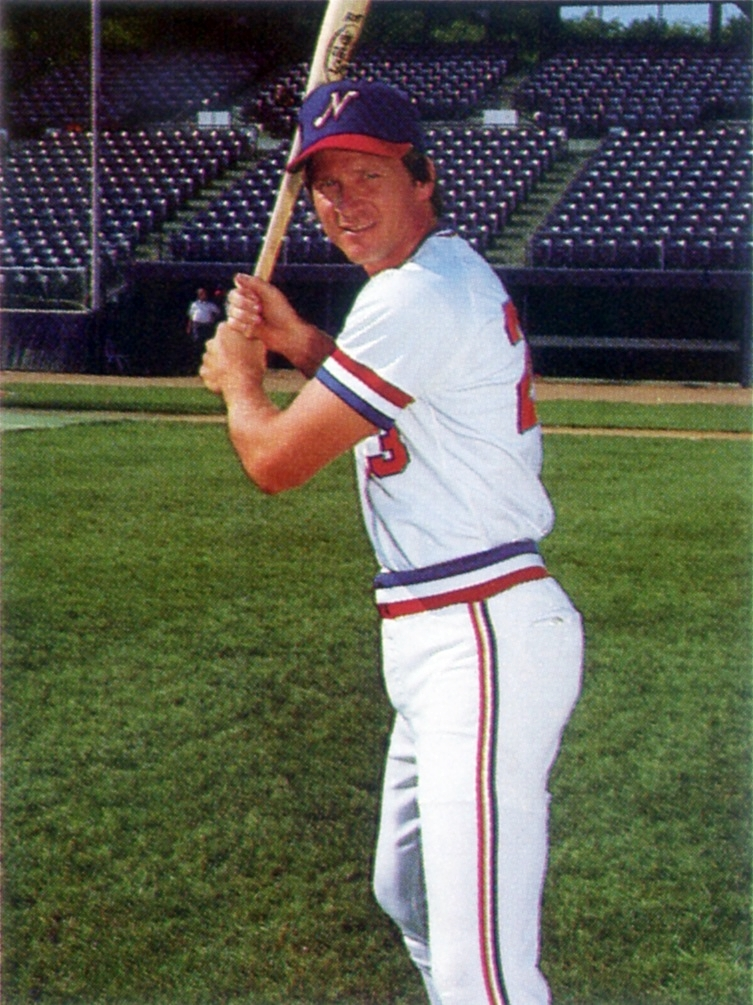
- Werner with the Nashville Sounds in 1985
- Catcher
- Born: March 8, 1953 (age 73); Appleton, Wisconsin, U.S.
- Batted: Right Threw: Right

MLB debut
- September 2, 1975, for the Cincinnati Reds

Last MLB appearance
- September 19, 1982, for the Texas Rangers

MLB statistics
- Batting average: .176
- Home runs: 2
- Runs batted in: 24
- Stats at Baseball Reference

Teams
- Cincinnati Reds (1975–1978, 1980); Texas Rangers (1981–1982)

Donald Paul Werner (born March 8, 1953) is an American former Major League Baseball catcher. He played during seven seasons at the major league level, playing for the Cincinnati Reds and Texas Rangers. In 1978, the Reds starting catcher, Johnny Bench, sat out 20 plus games with an injury which gave Don a starting role. On June 16 of the same year he caught the only no-hitter of Hall of Famer Tom Seaver's career. He was drafted by the Reds in the 5th round of the 1971 amateur draft after graduating from Appleton East High School. Werner played his first professional season with their Rookie League Gulf Coast Reds in 1971, and his last with Texas' Triple-A club, the Oklahoma RedHawks in 1988.

== Coaching ==
Since retiring as a player, he has been a minor league manager and coach. Werner was in the San Diego Padres chain for seven seasons. He joined the Baltimore Orioles organization as coach of the Delmarva Shorebirds in 2003–2004. He was the skipper of the Bowie Baysox in 2005–2006. After the 2006 season he was named minor league catching instructor for the Orioles. On June 20, 2011, he was named bullpen coach for the Baltimore Orioles, replacing Rick Adair, who had been promoted to interim pitching coach following the resignation of then pitching coach Mark Connor.

Werner then resumed his former post of minor league catching instructor for Baltimore in 2012.

Preceded by Dave Trembley	Bowie Baysox Manager; 2005–2006	Succeeded by Bien Figueroa
