= Pete O'Brien (first baseman) =

American baseball player (born 1958)

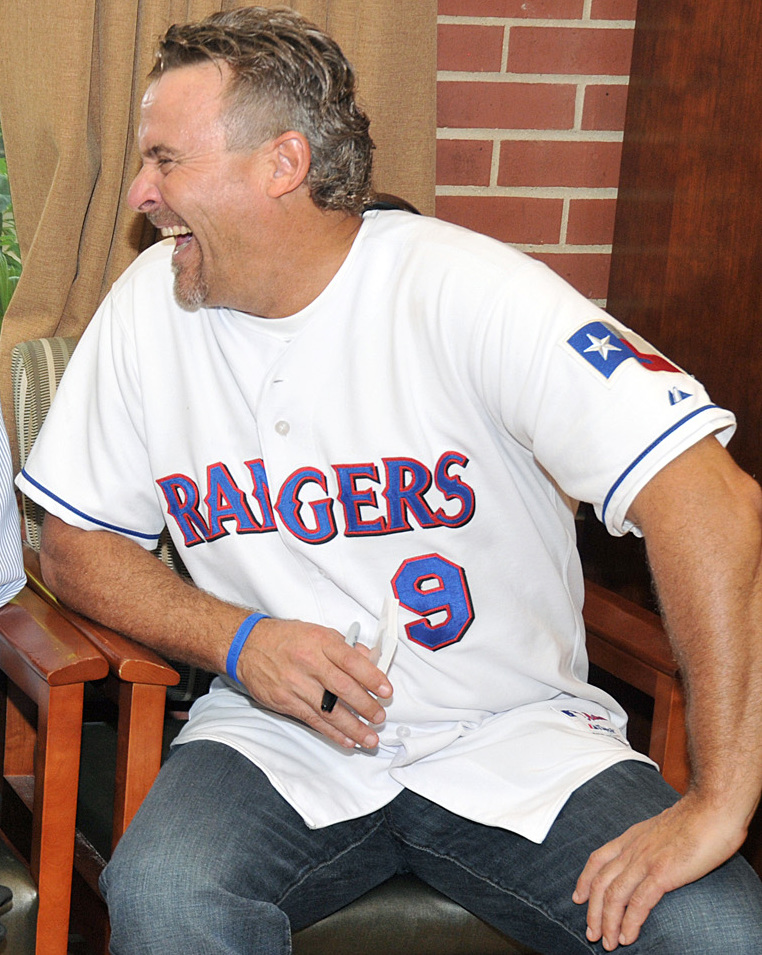
- O'Brien in 2010
- First baseman
- Born: February 9, 1958 (age 68); Santa Monica, California, U.S.
- Batted: Left Threw: Left

MLB debut
- September 3, 1982, for the Texas Rangers

Last MLB appearance
- July 20, 1993, for the Seattle Mariners

MLB statistics
- Batting average: .261
- Home runs: 169
- Runs batted in: 736
- Stats at Baseball Reference

Teams
- Texas Rangers (1982–1988); Cleveland Indians (1989); Seattle Mariners (1990–1993)

Peter Michael O'Brien (born February 9, 1958) is an American former first baseman in Major League Baseball who played for the Texas Rangers (1982–88), Cleveland Indians (1989), and Seattle Mariners (1990–93). He batted and threw left-handed.

== Early years ==
Born in Santa Monica, California, he was the youngest of seven children of Jimmy and Janice O'Brien. Raised in the Pebble Beach / Monterey area, O'Brien graduated from Carmel High School in 1976.

Neither drafted nor offered a scholarship out of high school, he played a year at Monterey Peninsula College and transferred to the University of Nebraska in Lincoln, then in the Big Eight Conference. After his junior season in 1979, he was selected in the fifteenth round (381st overall) of the amateur draft by the Texas Rangers.

== Playing career ==
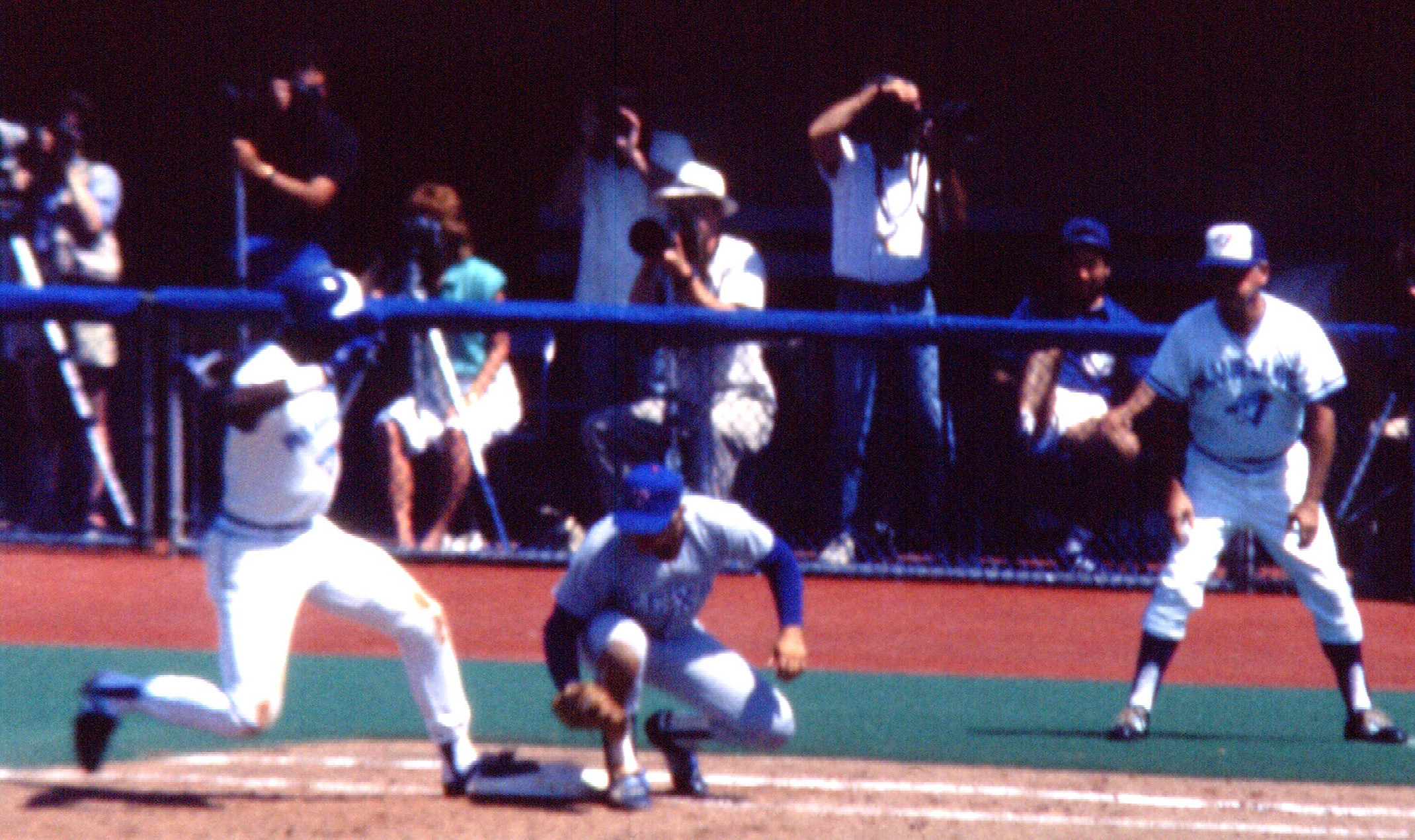
O'Brien (center) during a game between the Texas Rangers and Toronto Blue Jays at Exhibition Stadium, August 1985

O'Brien made his major league debut with the Rangers in September 1982 at age 24 and won the starting job in 1983. Following the 1988 season, he was part of a multi-player trade to the Cleveland Indians for Julio Franco, where O'Brien spent the 1989 season. In December 1989, he was the first free agent signed by the new ownership group of the Seattle Mariners, headed by Jeff Smulyan. The Mariners had the lowest payroll in the majors the previous season at $7.6 million; O'Brien's deal was for $7.6 million over four years. Known for his defense, he took over as the regular first baseman for Alvin Davis, who became the designated hitter.

In the final year of his contract in 1993 at age 35, O'Brien was primarily a designated hitter, as Tino Martinez had taken over at first base. Forewarned by new manager Lou Piniella, the well-liked veteran was released on July 21 to make room on the roster for the returning Edgar Martínez.

In a twelve-season career in 1,567 games played, O'Brien posted a .261 batting average, 169 home runs, and 736 RBI. His season highs were .290 in 1986, 23 home runs in 1986 & 1987, and 92 RBI in 1985.

== Personal ==
The fathers of O'Brien and peer Kent Hrbek, first baseman of the Minnesota Twins, were afflicted with amyotrophic lateral sclerosis (ALS, or Lou Gehrig's disease) while their sons were playing in the major leagues.
