= Bob Johnson (catcher) =

American baseball player (born 1959)

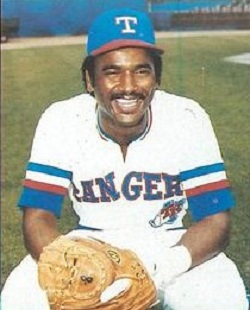
- Catcher
- Born: July 31, 1959 (age 66); Dallas, Texas, U.S.
- Batted: Right Threw: Right

MLB debut
- September 1, 1981, for the Texas Rangers

Last MLB appearance
- October 1, 1983, for the Texas Rangers

MLB statistics
- Batting average: .197
- Runs: 24
- Hits: 49
- Stats at Baseball Reference

Teams
- Texas Rangers (1981–1983)

Bobby Earl Johnson (born July 31, 1959) is an American former Major League Baseball catcher. He played during three seasons at the major league level for the Texas Rangers. He was drafted by the Rangers in the 9th round of the 1977 amateur draft. Johnson played his first professional season with their Rookie league Gulf Coast Rangers in 1977, and his last season with the New York Yankees' Class A-Advanced Fort Lauderdale Yankees and Triple-A Columbus Clippers in 1985.

A graduate of Kimball High School in Dallas, Johnson is the nephew of Hall of Fame infielder Ernie Banks.

On April 29, 1983, Johnson hit a 3-run home run against the New York Yankees in an 8–3 win.
