= Dan Boitano =

American baseball player (born 1953)

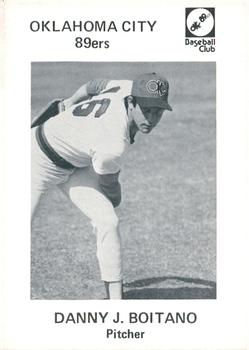
- Pitcher
- Born: March 22, 1953 (age 71); Sacramento, California, U.S.
- Batted: Right Threw: Right

MLB debut
- October 1, 1978, for the Philadelphia Phillies

Last MLB appearance
- October 1, 1982, for the Texas Rangers

MLB statistics
- Win–loss record: 2–2
- Earned run average: 5.68
- Strikeouts: 52
- Stats at Baseball Reference

Teams
- Philadelphia Phillies (1978); Milwaukee Brewers (1979–1980); New York Mets (1981); Texas Rangers (1982)

Danny Jon Boitano (born March 22, 1953) is an American former professional baseball pitcher, who played in Major League Baseball (MLB) from 1978 to 1982. Boitano holds the distinction of having been the Philadelphia Phillies' first round pick in the secondary phase of both the June 1972 and June 1973 amateur drafts. A highly touted prospect, he had also been drafted by the Milwaukee Brewers (seventh round, 1971), St. Louis Cardinals (18th overall pick in the first round of the January 1972 amateur draft, secondary phase) and Montreal Expos (second round, January 1973 amateur draft, secondary phase). He signed with the Phillies on June 19, 1973.

== Phillies prospect ==
In his first professional season, Boitano got off to a fast start, going 8–3 with a 2.08 earned run average for the New York–Penn League Auburn Phillies. From there, his minor league numbers tailed off a little, and his win–loss record was 37–43 when he made his major league debut on October 1, 1978, in a 5–3 loss to the Pittsburgh Pirates. During Spring training the following season, he was traded to the Milwaukee Brewers for Gary Beare.

== MLB journeyman ==
Boitano toiled in the Brewers' farm system for two seasons, making sixteen major league appearances when he was purchased by the New York Mets prior to the 1981 season. At the end of the season, he was traded with Doug Flynn to the Texas Rangers for Jim Kern (who was then packaged with Greg Harris and Alex Treviño for George Foster from the Cincinnati Reds). After one season in Texas, Boitano retired without having ever lived up to the early potential he showed.
