= Pat Putnam =

American baseball player (1953–2026)

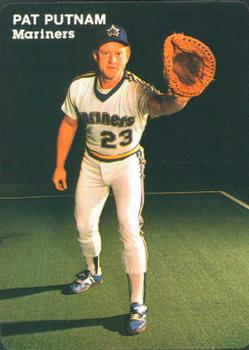
- First baseman
- Born: December 3, 1953; Bethel, Vermont, U.S.
- Died: August 25, 2026 (aged 72); Punta Gorda, Florida, U.S.
- Batted: Left Threw: Right

MLB debut
- September 2, 1977, for the Texas Rangers

Last MLB appearance
- September 20, 1984, for the Minnesota Twins

MLB statistics
- Batting average: .255
- Home runs: 63
- Runs batted in: 255

NPB statistics
- Batting average: .266
- Home runs: 37
- Runs batted in: 121
- Stats at Baseball Reference

Teams
- Texas Rangers (1977–1982); Seattle Mariners (1983–1984); Minnesota Twins (1984); Nippon-Ham Fighters (1986–1987)

Patrick Edward Putnam (December 3, 1953 – August 25, 2026) was an American professional baseball first baseman. He played in Major League Baseball (MLB) for the Texas Rangers, Seattle Mariners, and Minnesota Twins. Putnam also played for the Nippon-Ham Fighters of Nippon Professional Baseball (NPB).

== Career ==
=== Amateur ===
Putnam attended Fort Myers Senior High School, where he earned All-South Florida honors as a senior. He then played college ball at Miami Dade North Community College and University of South Alabama. In 1973, he played collegiate summer baseball with the Orleans Cardinals of the Cape Cod Baseball League.

=== Texas Rangers ===
Putnam was selected by the Texas Rangers in the first round of the 1975 Major League Baseball June Draft-Secondary Phase. He had been drafted a year earlier by the New York Mets, but did not sign. Putnam batted only .242 his first professional season in the Rangers' farm system. But in 1976 with the Class A Asheville Tourists, his batting average jumped to .361 with 24 home runs, 194 hits and 142 RBI. Putnam won the Western Carolina League's triple crown and was awarded The Sporting News Minor League Player of the Year, becoming the first single A player to get the honor since Gene Conley in 1953.

After batting .301 with 15 home runs and 102 runs batted in for the Triple A Tucson Toros in 1977, Putnam made his Major League debut as the designated hitter batting fourth against the Boston Red Sox on September 2.

He again tore up the PCL with Tucson in 1978, batting .309 with 21 home runs and 96 RBIs. He had only two RBIs with the Rangers that season; however, they were both significant. He managed to drive in the only run in their 1-0 victory over the Seattle Mariners on September 22, and two days later, in the Rangers' 5-3 victory at Arlington Stadium over the Mariners, Putnam hit his first major league home run.

Putnam mostly appeared in the line-up as a designated hitter until May 28, 1979, when regular Rangers first baseman Mike Jorgensen was hit in the head by a pitch from Boston Red Sox pitcher Andy Hassler. Putnam took over as the Rangers' regular first baseman for the next month. Putnam made the most of the opportunity and batted .277 with 18 home runs and 64 RBIs to finish fourth in Rookie of the Year balloting.

He failed to live up to his early promise, and in 1982 found himself back in the minors with the Denver Bears of the American Association. During the off-season, he was traded to the Seattle Mariners for Ron Musselman.

=== Final seasons ===
After a season and a half in Seattle, Putnam was traded to the Minnesota Twins on August 29, 1984. He signed a minor league contract with the Kansas City Royals in 1985, and spent the entire season with their triple A affiliate, the Omaha Royals. He played two seasons in Japan for the Nippon-Ham Fighters in 1986 and 1987 before retiring.

== Death ==
Putnam died on August 25, 2026, at the age of 72.
