= Dave Hostetler =

American baseball player (born 1956)

- First baseman / Designated hitter
- Born: March 27, 1956 (age 70); Pasadena, California, U.S.
- Batted: Right Threw: Right

Professional debut
- MLB: September 15, 1981, for the Montreal Expos
- NPB: April 4, 1986, for the Nankai Hawks

Last appearance
- NPB: October 18, 1987, for the Nankai Hawks
- MLB: May 3, 1988, for the Pittsburgh Pirates

MLB statistics
- Batting average: .229
- Home runs: 37
- Runs batted in: 124

NPB statistics
- Batting average: .270
- Home runs: 42
- Runs batted in: 142
- Stats at Baseball Reference

Teams
- Montreal Expos (1981); Texas Rangers (1982–1984); Nankai Hawks (1986–1987); Pittsburgh Pirates (1988)

David Alan Hostetler (born March 27, 1956) is an American former professional baseball first baseman and designated hitter who played for the Montreal Expos, Texas Rangers, and Pittsburgh Pirates of Major League Baseball (MLB). He also played for the Nankai Hawks of Nippon Professional Baseball (NPB). As of November 2007, he is the National Coordinator of Baseball Sales for equipment company Riddell and an ambassador to youth players.

== Career ==
=== Collegiate and early minor league career ===
Hostetler was drafted in the 4th round of the 1975 amateur draft by the San Francisco Giants out of junior college but did not sign. In 1976, he was again drafted by San Francisco and did not sign. He was taken in the second phase of the draft by the Cleveland Indians but returned to school again. In 1977, the Giants drafted him for a third time with no success.

He was a big star at the University of Southern California, where he was one of the key players on the team that won the 1978 College World Series, along with Dave Engle, Dave Van Gorder, and Tim Tolman. Hostetler hit a home run in the championship game against Arizona State University.

Drafted in the fourth round of the 1978 Major League Baseball draft by the Montreal Expos, he finally signed a deal. He debuted that year with the West Palm Beach Expos, hitting .269/~.361/.378.

In 1979, Hostetler spent his first full pro season with the Memphis Chicks, hitting .270/~.359/.445 with 20 homers, 114 RBI and 110 strikeouts. He tied for sixth in the Southern League in home runs, drove in the most and drew a league-high 14 intentional walks. He made the SL All-Star team at DH and drove in 19 more than runner-up Paul Householder.

=== Denver Bears ===
In 1980, he played on one of the truly great minor league teams, the Denver Bears, who won over two-thirds of their games. The other stars on his team that year were Tim Raines, Randy Bass, and Tim Wallach. Hostetler was the regular first baseman (Bass DH'ed) and hit .269/~.345/.371, with only 9 home runs and 58 RBI in a very hitter-friendly environment. He was the only member of the infield not to make the American Association All-Star team as Raines (2B), Wallach (3B) and Jerry Manuel (SS) were all selected.

While Denver was not as good in 1981, Hostetler was far better, hitting .318 with 27 HR and 103 RBI. His homer total was more than Nick Esasky and Ryne Sandberg combined in the 1981 American Association, and he was only one home run behind league leader George Bjorkman. Only teammate Dan Briggs, with 110 RBI, drove in more. Hostetler was the A.A. All-Star first baseman that year. Getting his first major league playing time, he went 3 for 6 with a homer for the 1981 Expos. All of his hits came in the Expos' last regular-season game, on October 4 in New York, after the team had clinched the second-half title (Boxscore). His monster home run off Pete Falcone was the team's only run in a 2-1 loss in which Montreal fielded a AAA line-up after the first few innings.

=== Texas Rangers ===
Hostetler was traded along with Larry Parrish from the Expos to the Texas Rangers for Al Oliver on March 31, 1982. He was a .232 hitter, with 22 HR and 67 RBI for the Rangers in 1982, as their primary first baseman, but he struck out 113 times in 418 at-bats and saw his playing time dwindle after that. He led the team in home runs in spite of not playing his first game until May 29, giving Ranger fans hopes that he would become a huge power threat. However, he was replaced at 1B by rookie Pete O'Brien in 1983, and did not last long at DH as his power faded away, with only 11 home runs in 94 games while his strikeout rate went from bad to awful. Texas Ranger fans had hoped he might someday be as good as Dave Kingman, but Hostetler never had much success in the Major Leagues. He had been acquired in 1982, along with Larry Parrish, in a spring training trade with the Montreal Expos for Al Oliver, who subsequently went on to tear up the National League. At least Texas fans were able to see Parrish be productive for several seasons in Arlington. Hostetler's strong start and quick fade were much like Kevin Maas's efforts with the New York Yankees in 1990.

=== Back to the American Association ===
In 1984, Hostetler returned to the American Association with the Oklahoma City 89ers, hitting .304 with 11 homers. He was then traded back to Montreal in exchange for Chris Welsh. He began the 1985 season with the Indianapolis Indians, but was sold to the Chicago Cubs on May 12 and assigned to the Iowa Cubs. Overall that year, he hit .256/~.332/.490 with 29 HR in 132 games. He led the A.A. in home runs plus topped the league with 89 RBI, and made the All-Star team as the DH.

=== Nankai Hawks ===
Hostetler also spent time playing baseball in Japan, appearing with the Nankai Hawks of the Pacific League in 1986 and 1987. The first year he hit .285/.346/.480 with 25 home runs, and in 1987 he hit .251/.332/.417 with 17 home runs.

=== At the end of the road ===
Coming back to the USA, he signed with the Pittsburgh Pirates and played six games with them in 1988. He spent most of the 1988 season with the second minor league team to draw a million fans, the Buffalo Bisons of the American Association, hitting .187/~.280/.311 in 84 games. He spent his time there mostly warming the bench behind Randy Milligan and Orestes Destrade, playing only 14 games at first base. Most of his starts came at DH.
