= Al Lachowicz =

American baseball player (born 1960)

- Pitcher
- Born: September 6, 1960 (age 65); Pittsburgh, Pennsylvania, U.S.
- Batted: Right Threw: Right

MLB debut
- September 13, 1983, for the Texas Rangers

Last MLB appearance
- October 2, 1983, for the Texas Rangers

MLB statistics
- Win–loss record: 0–1
- Earned run average: 2.25
- Strikeouts: 8
- Stats at Baseball Reference

Teams
- Texas Rangers (1983)

Allen Robert Lachowicz (born September 6, 1960) is an American former Major League Baseball pitcher who played for the Texas Rangers during the 1980s.

== Biography ==
The right-hander was drafted by the Texas Rangers in the 1st round (24th pick) of the 1981 amateur draft, and he appeared in two games for the Rangers during the last three weeks of the 1983 season.

On September 13, 1983, Lachowicz made his major league debut at the Oakland–Alameda County Coliseum and pitched two scoreless innings of relief in a 6-5 loss to the Oakland Athletics. Lachowicz struck out Bill Almon for his first major league strikeout. Nineteen days later at Arlington Stadium he started the last game of the season. In front of a small crowd of 8,727 he pitched six strong innings, giving up just two earned runs, but the Rangers lost to the California Angels 2-0.

Career totals include a 0-1 record, eight strikeouts in eight innings pitched, and an earned run average of 2.25.
