= George Wright (outfielder) =

American baseball player (born 1958)

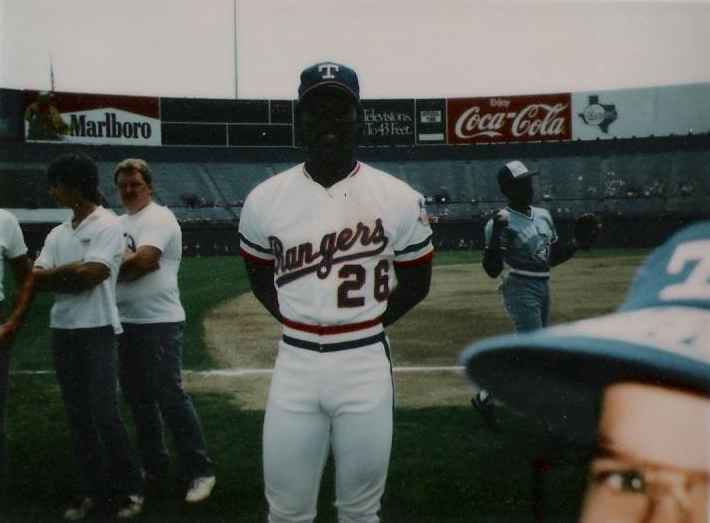
- Outfielder
- Born: December 22, 1958 (age 67); Oklahoma City, Oklahoma, U.S.

Professional debut
- MLB: April 10, 1982, for the Texas Rangers
- NPB: April 9, 1988, for the Nankai Hawks

Last appearance
- MLB: October 5, 1986, for the Montreal Expos
- NPB: October 3, 1993, for the Fukuoka Daiei Hawks

MLB statistics
- Batting average: .245
- Home runs: 42
- Runs batted in: 208

NPB statistics
- Batting average: .247
- Home runs: 20
- Runs batted in: 71
- Stats at Baseball Reference

Teams
- Texas Rangers (1982–1986); Montreal Expos (1986); Nankai Hawks (1988); Fukuoka Daiei Hawks (1993)

George De Witt Wright (December 22, 1958) is an American former professional baseball player. He played five seasons in Major League Baseball (MLB) from 1982–86 for the Texas Rangers and Montreal Expos, primarily as a center fielder.

== Career ==
In 1983, Wright had a career year with a surprising Texas Rangers club that was in first place at the all-star break. For the season he played in all 162 games and hit .287 with 18 home runs, 80 rbi, and a .745 OPS. The next several seasons he was often injured and failed to live up to his 1983 performance. In his last game with the Rangers he committed a costly three-base error in the bottom of the 9th inning of a game in which Charlie Hough would later lose a no-hitter and the game.

Wright later played briefly for the Montreal Expos and eventually had two seasons in Japan for the Hawks, in 1988 when they were the Nankai Hawks, and in 1993 when they were the Daiei Hawks. He also spent several seasons in the Mexican League, from 1990–92 and 1994-97.
