= Larry Parrish =

American baseball player and manager (born 1953)

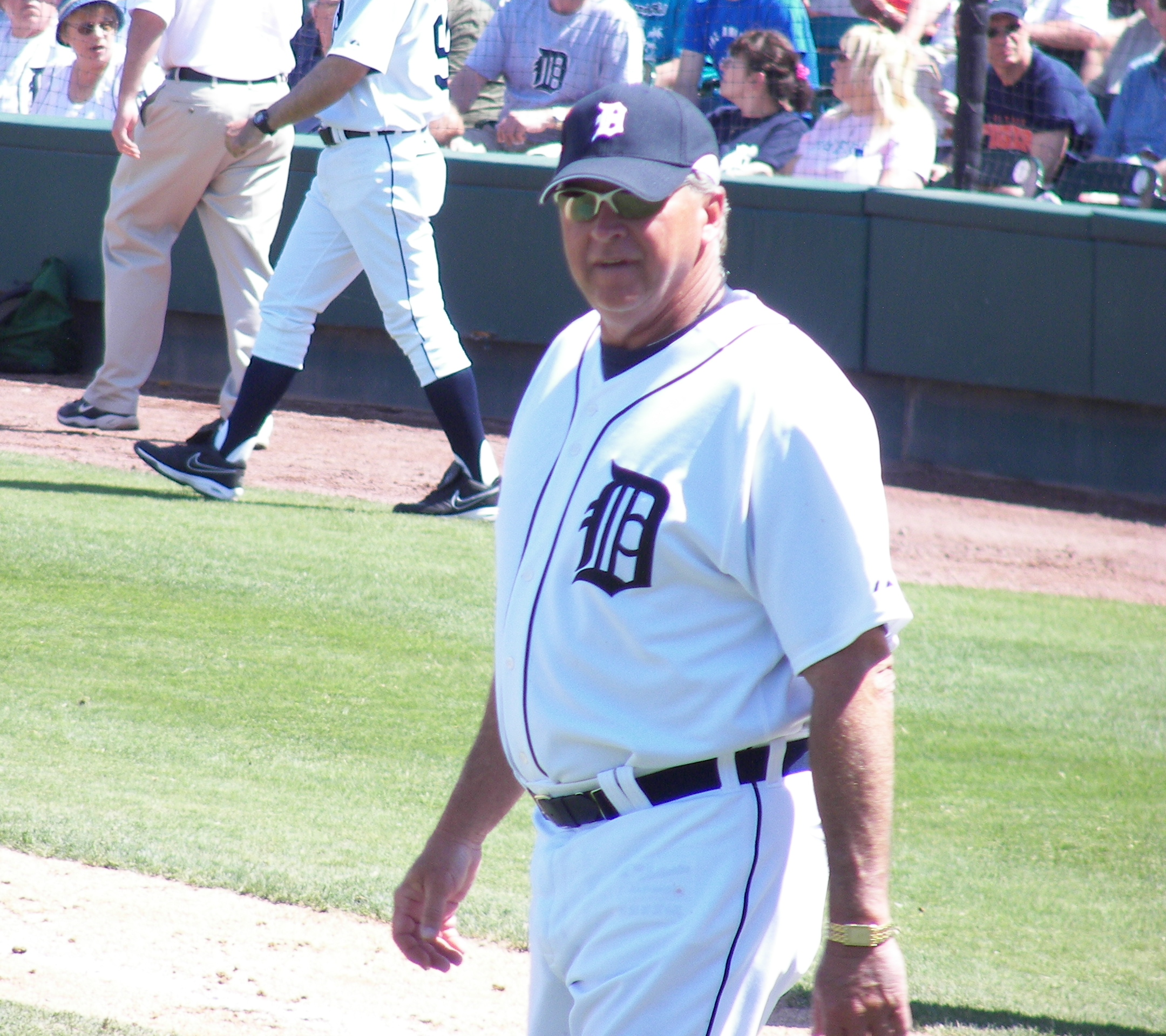
- Third baseman / Right fielder / Designated hitter / Manager
- Born: November 10, 1953 (age 72); Winter Haven, Florida, U.S.
- Batted: Right Threw: Right

Professional debut
- MLB: September 6, 1974, for the Montreal Expos
- NPB: April 8, 1989, for the Yakult Swallows

Last appearance
- MLB: October 2, 1988, for the Boston Red Sox
- NPB: August 27, 1990, for the Hanshin Tigers

MLB statistics
- Batting average: .263
- Home runs: 256
- Runs batted in: 992
- Managerial record: 82–104
- Winning %: .441

NPB statistics
- Batting average: .260
- Home runs: 70
- Runs batted in: 183
- Stats at Baseball Reference
- Managerial record at Baseball Reference

Teams
- As player: Montreal Expos (1974–1981); Texas Rangers (1982–1988); Boston Red Sox (1988); Yakult Swallows (1989); Hanshin Tigers (1990); As manager: Detroit Tigers (1998–1999); As coach: Detroit Tigers (1997–1998); Atlanta Braves (2011)

Career highlights and awards
- 2× All-Star (1979, 1987); Montreal Expos Hall of Fame

Larry Alton Parrish (born November 10, 1953) is an American former professional baseball player, coach and manager. He played in Major League Baseball (MLB) and in Nippon Professional Baseball (NPB) as a third baseman from 1974 to 1990, most prominently as a member of the Montreal Expos and the Texas Rangers.

A two-time All-Star player, Parrish averaged 22 home runs and 85 runs batted in per season and hit three home runs in a game four times during his 15-year major league career. After playing one season with the Boston Red Sox, he played his final two seasons of professional baseball in Japan with the Yakult Swallows and the Hanshin Tigers.

After his playing career, Parrish continued to work in professional baseball as a coach and manager at both the major league and minor league levels. He is the winningest manager in Toledo Mud Hens history, serving as the team's manager for a record eight seasons, highlighted by back-to-back Governors' Cup championships in 2005 and 2006. He was inducted into the International League Hall of Fame in 2013 for his career as the Mud Hens manager. He has his managerial number 15 retired by the Mud Hens, just 1 of 3 for the organization.

== Playing career ==
Making his debut in 1974 at the age of 20, Parrish became a solid hitter as a third baseman in the 1970s and 1980s, hitting 20 or more home runs in a season 5 times during his Major League career. He was a two-time All-Star, and in 1979, he was named the Montreal Expos Player of the Year after batting .307 with 30 homers and 82 runs batted in, and finishing fourth in National League MVP voting. Parrish is the only Montreal Expos player to ever hit three home runs in one game on three separate occasions (May 29, 1977, July 30, 1978, and April 25, 1980). In the May 1977 game against the Cardinals, he went 5–for–5, batting in 5 runs in a 14–4 victory. In the April 1980 game, he drove in all 7 runs for Montreal in an 8–7 loss to Atlanta.

Parrish was traded along with Dave Hostetler from the Expos to the Texas Rangers for Al Oliver on March 31, 1982. He originally was supposed to have been the Rangers' starting right fielder. In 1982, during his first season with the Rangers, Parrish tied a major league record held by Jim Northrup when he hit three grand slams in the span of one week.

Parrish ranks 15th on the Texas Rangers' all-time home run list with 149 and 14th in RBIs at 522. He closed out his American Major League career by joining the Boston Red Sox during the stretch run of the 1988 season; while he was with the Red Sox, the team won the American League Eastern Division championship.

After his Major League Baseball career ended, Parrish played for two different Japanese major league teams. Parrish had a career .263 batting average in Major League Baseball with 256 home runs and 992 runs batted in. In 13 career playoff games, he batted .182 with no home runs and three RBIs.

== Coaching career ==
After retiring from the majors and spending time playing for the Yakult Swallows and Hanshin Tigers of the Japanese Central League, Parrish became a full-time coach within the Detroit Tigers organization. In 1992, Parrish was named the manager for the Single-A Niagara Falls Rapids of the New York–Penn League which won the league championship in 1993. In 1995, he was named the roving hitting instructor for the Tigers minor league system. In 1996, he returned to the dugout as the manager of the Double-A Jacksonville Suns, where he won another League Championship the same year. Parrish then served as bench coach under Tigers manager Buddy Bell for the 1997 season and part of the 1998 season before Bell was fired. Parrish was promoted as the replacement and managed the Tigers from 1998 to 1999, compiling an 82–104 record. However, he was replaced by Phil Garner for the 2000 season. Parrish managed the Tigers through their final season at Tiger Stadium. Parrish remained in the Tigers organization as a scout from 2000 to 2002, and in 2003, he returned to the dugout once again as the manager for the Triple-A Toledo Mud Hens of the International League.

In 2005, Parrish managed the Mud Hens to an impressive 89–55 record and the Governors' Cup as champions of the International League. The Mud Hens defeated the Indianapolis Indians. Following the season, Parrish was named the 2005 Minor League Manager of the Year by The Sporting News.

In 2006, Parrish led the Mud Hens to a 76–66 record and a repeat of the Governor's Cup, giving the Mud Hens their third title and making them back-to-back champions for the first time in team history. This time, the Mud Hens defeated the Rochester Red Wings. The team moved on to play in the first Triple-A Baseball National Championship Game, in Oklahoma City, where they would take on the Tucson Sidewinders of the Pacific Coast League, but the Mud Hens fell to the Sidewinders by a score of 5–2.

On October 29, 2010, it was announced that Parrish would become the hitting coach for the Atlanta Braves, replacing Terry Pendleton, who was moved to first base coach. After the Braves offense went from first in the National League in On-base percentage in 2010 to 14th in 2011 with roughly the same lineup, Braves general manager Frank Wren announced on September 30, 2011, that Parrish would not return to his duties for the 2012 season.

Parrish was named manager of the West Michigan Whitecaps for the 2013 season.

Parrish was elected to the International League Hall of Fame as a manager in 2013.

On September 18, 2013, it was announced that Parrish would return to the Mud Hens for his third stint as manager. He replaced Phil Nevin, whose contract was not renewed. On August 2, 2015, Parrish announced his plan to retire at the end of the Mud Hens' season.

== Highlights ==
- Two-time All-Star (1979, 1987).
- Hit three grand slams in one week (July 4, 7, and 10 in 1982), tying a long-standing MLB record set by Jim Northrup in the Detroit Tigers' World Series Championship season in 1968.
- Compiled four career three-home run games, including one instance in which the home runs came on consecutive at-bats (July 30, 1978) and is one of only eight players to accomplish the feat in both leagues. (The others are Babe Ruth, Johnny Mize, Dave Kingman, Cory Snyder, Darnell Coles, Claudell Washington, and Darryl Strawberry.)
- Four league championships as manager:
  - 1993 (Niagara Falls of the New York–Penn League)
  - 1996 (Jacksonville Suns of the Southern League)
  - 2005 and 2006 (Toledo Mud Hens of the International League)

== See also ==
- List of Major League Baseball career home run leaders
