= John Butcher (baseball) =

American baseball player (born 1957)

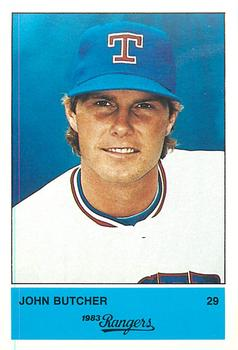
- Pitcher
- Born: March 8, 1957 (age 69); Glendale, California, U.S.
- Batted: Right Threw: Right

MLB debut
- September 8, 1980, for the Texas Rangers

Last MLB appearance
- September 9, 1986, for the Cleveland Indians

MLB statistics
- Win–loss record: 36–49
- Earned run average: 4.42
- Strikeouts: 363
- Stats at Baseball Reference

Teams
- Texas Rangers (1980–1983); Minnesota Twins (1984–1986); Cleveland Indians (1986)

John Daniel Butcher (born March 8, 1957) is an American former Major League Baseball pitcher who played for seven seasons. He played for the Texas Rangers from 1980 to 1983, the Minnesota Twins from 1984 to 1986, and the Cleveland Indians in 1986.
