= Gulf Coast League Rangers =

- (1973-2002); Port Charlotte, Florida (1987-2002); Sarasota, Florida (1973-1986)

Minor league affiliations
- Previous classes: Rookie
- Previous leagues: Gulf Coast League

Major league affiliations
- Previous teams: Texas Rangers

Minor league titles
- League titles (8): 1973; 1975; 1976; 1978; 1984; 1993; 1998; 2000
- Division titles (7): 1983; 1984; 1985; 1993; 1996; 1999; 2000

Team data
- Name: GCL Rangers
- Previous parks: Charlotte County Stadium (1987-2002); Payne Park (1973-1986)

The Gulf Coast League Rangers, or GCL Rangers were a minor league baseball club in the Gulf Coast League between 1973 and 2002. The club was consistently competitive winning eight league championships and seven division titles, while only posting five losing seasons. The team originally played in Sarasota, Florida until 1987, when it relocated south to Port Charlotte, Florida. The team left the Gulf Coast League in 2003 for the Arizona League as exists today as the Arizona League Rangers.

== Season-by-season ==
Year	Record	Finish	Manager	Playoffs
1973	41-15	1st	Bill Haywood	League Champs; No Playoffs until 1983
1974	32-20	3rd	Bill Haywood	
1975	41-12	1st	Joe Klein	League Champs
1976	38-16	1st	Joe Klein	League Champs
1977	27-27	4th	Joe Klein	
1978	33-22	1st	Joe Klein	League Champs
1979	33-21	2nd	Andy Hancock	
1980	35-28	4th	Andy Hancock	
1981	32-30	6th	Andy Hancock	
1982	36-27	3rd	Tom Grieve	
1983	40-22	1st	Andy Hancock	Lost League Finals vs. GCL Dodgers (1 game to 0)
1984	36-27	2nd (t)	Mike Bucci	League Champs vs. GCL White Sox (1 game to 0)
1985	33-29	5th	Rudy Jaramillo	Lost League Finals vs. GCL Yankees; Playoff game rained out, Yankees declared champions based on record
1986	31-31	6th	Rudy Jaramillo	
1987	23-39	8th	Stan Hough	
1988	35-28	6th	Chino Cadahia	
1989	33-30	8th	Chino Cadahia	
1990	36-27	3rd (t)	Chino Cadahia	
1991	30-29	6th (t)	Chino Cadahia	
1992	28-31	11th	Chino Cadahia	
1993	40-20	1st	Chino Cadahia	League Champs vs. GCL Astros (2 games to 0)
1994	32-28	7th	Chino Cadahia	
1995	24-34	10th	Chino Cadahia	
1996	37-23	3rd	Jim Byrd	Lost League Finals vs. GCL Yankees (2 games to 0); Won in 1st round vs. GCL Cubs (1 game to 0)
1997	34-26	4th	Jim Byrd	Lost League Finals vs. GCL Mets (2 games to 0); Won in 1st round vs. GCL Royals (1 game to 0)
1998	34-26	3rd (t)	Darryl Kennedy	League Champs vs. GCL Devil Rays (2 games to 0); Won in 1st round vs. GCL Twins (1 game to 0)
1999	37-23	2nd	Darryl Kennedy	Lost in 1st round vs. GCL Twins (1 game to 0)
2000	38-18	1st	Darryl Kennedy	League Champs vs. GCL Yankees (2 games to 1)
2001	24-35	10th	Carlos Subero	
2002	28-32	8th (t)	Carlos Subero	
