= Nick Capra =

American baseball player & coach (born 1958)

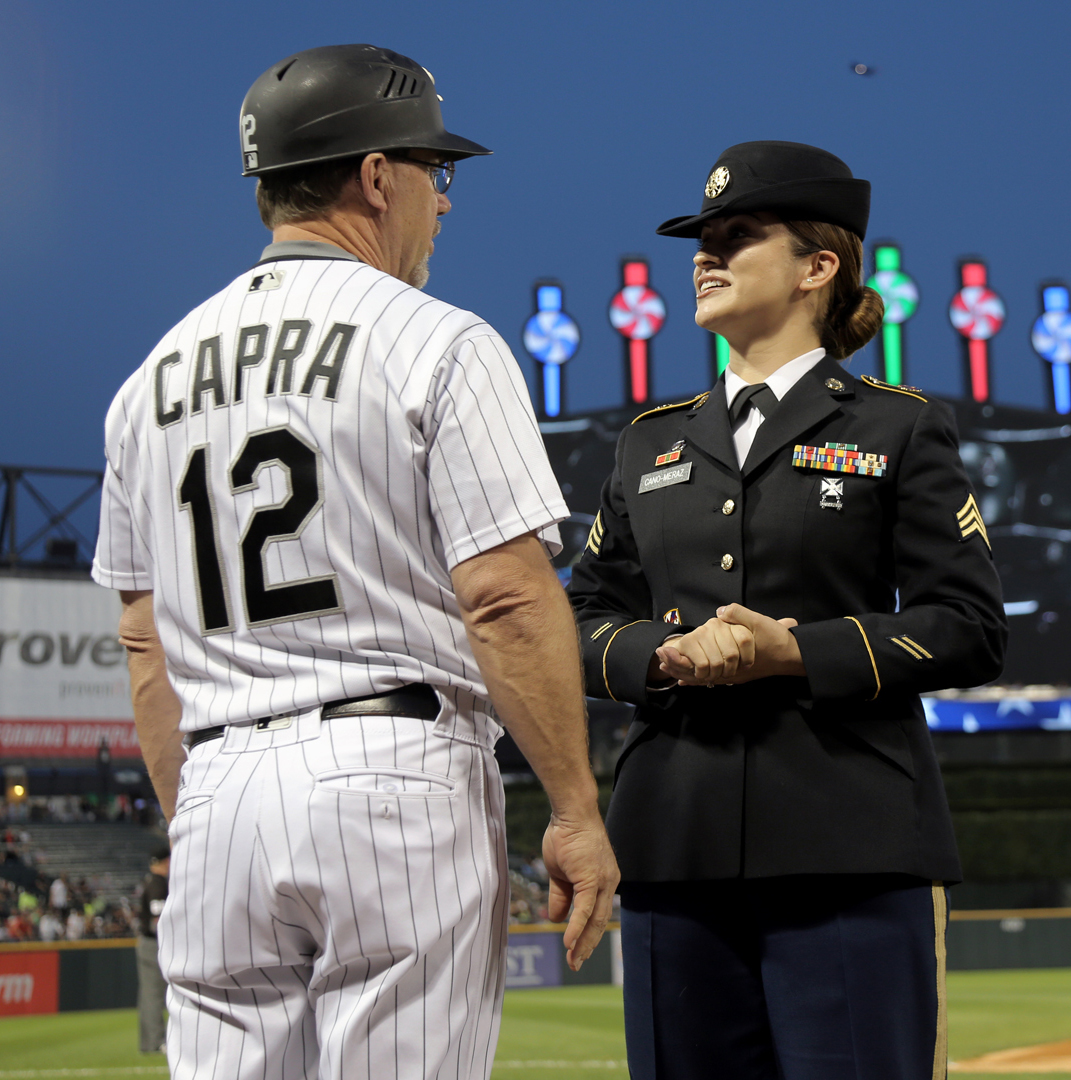
- Capra (left) with the White Sox in 2017
- Outfielder
- Born: March 8, 1958 (age 67); Denver, Colorado, U.S.
- Batted: Right Threw: Right

MLB debut
- September 6, 1982, for the Texas Rangers

Last MLB appearance
- April 24, 1991, for the Texas Rangers

MLB statistics
- Batting average: .167
- Home runs: 1
- Runs batted in: 1
- Stats at Baseball Reference

Teams
- As player: Texas Rangers (1982–1983, 1985); Kansas City Royals (1988); Texas Rangers (1991); As coach: Chicago White Sox (2017–2020)

Nick Lee Capra (born March 8, 1958) is an American professional baseball coach and former player. He appeared in 45 Major League Baseball games over five seasons of a long professional career. He began coaching in 1996 and was the Chicago White Sox third base coach from 2017 to 2020.

== Playing career ==
Capra attended Lamar Community College, Blinn College, and the University of Oklahoma. The Texas Rangers drafted him in the third round of the 1979 Major League Baseball (MLB) draft. An outfielder, Capra made his professional debut with the Rangers' Double-A Tulsa Drillers affiliate in 1979.

He appeared in 45 MLB games over portions of five seasons, starting in 1982 for the Rangers. On September 22 of that season, he hit his only major league home run, a solo shot off Steve Baker of the Oakland Athletics. He also played for Texas in parts of the 1983 and 1985 season before playing for the Kansas City Royals in 1988 then returning to the majors for a final time with the Rangers in 1991.

In 1995, his final season as a player, he began the year as a replacement player with the Florida Marlins during the ongoing strike. When the strike ended, he joined the Charlotte Knights and was chosen to play in the Triple-A All-Star Game.

Over the course of a 17-season minor league career, he batted .294 with 85 home runs and 483 stolen bases.

== Coaching career ==
Capra joined the Chicago White Sox in 1996 as a minor league manager, working at all levels of the minors for 11 seasons (1996–2005; 2008). In 2006 and 2007, he served Chicago as roving minor league hitting coordinator. Then from 2009 to 2011, he was the team's minor league field coordinator before becoming the club's director of player development for five seasons (2012–2016). On October 14, 2016, he was named the third base coach for the White Sox. His appointment to manager Rick Renteria's staff for 2017 was his first coaching role in the majors and his 22nd season in the White Sox organization. The White Sox replaced him following the 2020 season as Tony La Russa became the team's manager.

Preceded by Chris Cron	Birmingham Barons manager 2000–2001	Succeeded by Wally Backman
Preceded by Nick Leyva	Charlotte Knights manager 2002–2004	Succeeded by Nick Leyva
Preceded by Joe McEwing	Chicago White Sox third base coach 2017–2020	Succeeded by Joe McEwing
