= Mike Mason (baseball) =

American baseball player (born 1958)

- Pitcher
- Born: November 21, 1958; Faribault, Minnesota, U.S.
- Batted: Left Threw: Left

MLB debut
- September 13, 1982, for the Texas Rangers

Last MLB appearance
- May 8, 1988, for the Minnesota Twins

MLB statistics
- Win–loss record: 29–39
- Earned run average: 4.53
- Strikeouts: 363
- Stats at Baseball Reference

Teams
- Texas Rangers (1982–1987); Chicago Cubs (1987); Minnesota Twins (1988)

Michael Paul Mason (born November 21, 1958) is a retired Major League Baseball player who played pitcher from 1982–1988 for the Texas Rangers, Chicago Cubs, and Minnesota Twins. He is currently the pitching coach for the Iowa Cubs. His best season came as a member of the 1984 Texas Rangers.
