= Billy Sample =

American baseball player (born 1955)

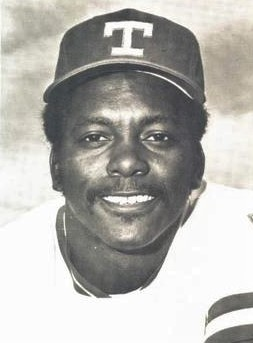
- Outfielder
- Born: April 2, 1955 (age 71); Roanoke, Virginia, U.S.
- Batted: Right Threw: Right

MLB debut
- September 2, 1978, for the Texas Rangers

Last MLB appearance
- October 5, 1986, for the Atlanta Braves

MLB statistics
- Batting average: .272
- Home runs: 46
- Runs batted in: 230
- Stats at Baseball Reference

Teams
- Texas Rangers (1978–1984); New York Yankees (1985); Atlanta Braves (1986)

William Amos Sample (born April 2, 1955), is an American former professional baseball outfielder. He played in Major League Baseball (MLB) for the Texas Rangers, New York Yankees, and Atlanta Braves in parts of nine seasons spanning 1978–1986.

== Early life ==
A native of Roanoke, Virginia, Sample grew up in Salem, Virginia and graduated from Salem's Andrew Lewis High School in 1973. While at school, Sample was a three-sport standout in football, basketball, and baseball. As a junior wide receiver on the football team, Sample scored the winning touchdown in a 1971 state AAA quarterfinal game. A victory later, Andrew Lewis advanced to the state championship, where Sample's team lost to T. C. Williams High School - a game dramatized with historical liberties in the motion picture Remember The Titans. After that, Sample attended Madison College (now James Madison University) for three years, before being drafted by the Rangers in 1976.

== Major League Baseball career ==
Sample singled on his first major league pitch in 1978, made the Topps All Rookie Team in 1979, had his longest hitting streak (19 games) in 1981, reached base in 37 consecutive games in 1983, was fifth in the American League in steals (44 of 52) in 1983, sixth in power-speed numbers and was the 10th toughest to strike out in the league, with only teammate Buddy Bell having hit more home runs of the preceding nine. Sample finished with a career .272 average. He retired in 1986 with the Atlanta Braves.

== Broadcasting and writing career ==
Primarily a broadcaster/writer after his playing days, Sample has broadcast for the Braves, Seattle Mariners, and California Angels, as well as contributing to NPR, CBS Radio, ESPN, and MLB.com. As a writer, Sample has been published in Sports Illustrated and The New York Times, and was one of the columnists at the inception of USA Today's Baseball Weekly (now Sports Weekly). Sample was also the baseball consultant for Showtime's production Joe Torre: Curveballs Along the Way, which chronicled the Yankees' 1996 season.

Billy Sample most recently added filmmaker to his résumé, producing his award-winning screenplay (Hoboken Film Festival 2011) into the movie "Reunion 108," an edgy, satirical comedy with a baseball backdrop directed by filmmaker James Suttles released in October 2013.

In June 2016, Sample self-published on Amazon his first book, A Year in Pinstripes ... And Then Some, which highlighted his 1985 season with the New York Yankees that included anecdotes from his childhood, as well as his seasons with the Texas Rangers and the Atlanta Braves.

On October 18, 2019, the stadium in which Sample played American Legion baseball and high school home football games known as Municipal Field when he was growing up, later known as Kiwanis Park was renamed Billy Sample Field at Kiwanis Park. It was also the Single-A minor league home of the Pittsburgh Pirates, Salem Buccaneers; and where Sample watched many future major leaguers in the earlier stages of their professional careers including future teammate Mario Mendoza.
