= Dave Schmidt (pitcher) =

American baseball player (born 1957)

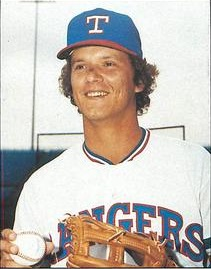
- Pitcher
- Born: April 22, 1957 (age 69); Niles, Michigan, U.S.
- Batted: Right Threw: Right

MLB debut
- May 1, 1981, for the Texas Rangers

Last MLB appearance
- May 26, 1992, for the Seattle Mariners

MLB statistics
- Win–loss record: 54–55
- Earned run average: 3.88
- Strikeouts: 479
- Stats at Baseball Reference

Teams
- Texas Rangers (1981–1985); Chicago White Sox (1986); Baltimore Orioles (1987–1989); Montreal Expos (1990–1991); Seattle Mariners (1992)

David Joseph Schmidt (born April 22, 1957) is an American former baseball pitcher and coach. He played for the Texas Rangers, Chicago White Sox, Baltimore Orioles, Montreal Expos, and Seattle Mariners in Major League Baseball (MLB) between 1981 and 1992. Schmidt threw and batted right-handed. He was a minor-league pitching coach with the Orioles from 1998 to 2024.

Schmidt played high school baseball at Granada Hills High School in Los Angeles, California, graduating in 1975. He then played college baseball for the nearby UCLA Bruins, going 24–7 over three seasons.

Texas drafted Schmidt in the 26th round of the 1979 MLB draft. He made his MLB debut in May 1981, working as a starting pitcher. His 1982 season, working partly as a reliever, ended with an elbow injury in September. He returned from the disabled list in May 1983. He led Rangers pitchers in saves and appearances in 1984.

The Rangers traded Schmidt along with Wayne Tolleson to the White Sox for Scott Fletcher, Edwin Correa, and José Mota on November 25, 1985. He signed as a free agent with the Orioles on January 16, 1987. He had his second surgery to remove bone spurs in his elbow in 1987. He was a relief pitcher and spot starter during his first two seasons with the Orioles before moving to the starting rotation in 1989, when he was the Baltimore's Opening Day starter. He returned to a relief role in August. Schmidt signed as a free agent with Montreal after the season. He signed with the Mariners in late March 1992, pitching in his final three MLB games before being released in June.

Schmidt was a minor-league pitching coach and coordinator with the Orioles from 1998 until the team declined to renew his contract on September 9, 2024.
