= Mike Smithson (baseball) =

American baseball player (born 1955)

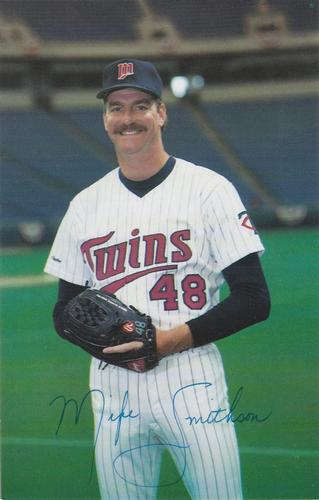
- Smithson in 1987
- Pitcher
- Born: January 21, 1955 (age 71); Centerville, Tennessee, U.S.
- Batted: Right Threw: Right

MLB debut
- August 27, 1982, for the Texas Rangers

Last MLB appearance
- September 28, 1989, for the Boston Red Sox

MLB statistics
- Win–loss record: 76–86
- Earned run average: 4.58
- Strikeouts: 731
- Stats at Baseball Reference

Teams
- Texas Rangers (1982–1983); Minnesota Twins (1984–1987); Boston Red Sox (1988–1989)

Billy Mike Smithson (born January 21, 1955) is an American former Major League Baseball (MLB) right-handed pitcher who played for the Texas Rangers, Minnesota Twins, and Boston Red Sox from 1982 to 1989.

== Amateur career ==
Smithson attended the University of Tennessee, and in 1975 he played collegiate summer baseball with the Orleans Cardinals of the Cape Cod Baseball League. He was selected by the Red Sox in the fifth round of the 1976 Major League Baseball draft.

== Professional career ==
During the course of his seven-year minor league career, he participated in the longest baseball game in history between the Pawtucket Red Sox and Rochester Red Wings during the 1981 season. During the early morning hours of Sunday, April 19, 1981, he worked the full 15th, 16th and 17th innings, and got two outs in the 18th inning before turning the ball over to Win Remmerswaal. Smithson allowed two hits and three bases on balls in 3 2/3 innings pitched—but no runs. The game was suspended after 32 innings, and resumed June 23; Smithson's PawSox won it in the bottom of the 33rd frame.

After attending spring training with the 1982 Red Sox, Smithson was traded to the Rangers on April 9 for left-handed relief pitcher John Henry Johnson. He was recalled by the Rangers from the Triple-A Denver Bears and began his MLB career late in August as a starting pitcher—the role he would play for much of his big-league tenure.

As a member of the Twins, Smithson led the American League in games started in 1984 and 1985. He won 15 games in each season. The Red Sox brought Smithson back as a free agent in 1988, and he spent two seasons with them as a swing man, making 37 starts in 71 game, He received a Championship ring as a member of the Twins roster that won the 1987 World Series although he did not play. Along the way, he pitched against the Oakland Athletics in the 1988 American League Championship Series, his only postseason appearance, providing 2 1/3 innings of scoreless relief in Game 4, which Oakland won to complete a sweep over the Red Sox.

Smithson allowed 1,473 hits and 383 bases on balls in 1,356 1/3 innings of big-league work. He made 204 starts out of his 240 total games pitched, and recorded 731 strikeouts, 41 complete games, six shutouts and two saves. He retired after the 1989 campaign. In 2009, he was named to the University of Tennessee's All Century Team.
