= Mark Wagner (baseball) =

American baseball player (born 1954)

- Shortstop
- Born: March 4, 1954 (age 72); Conneaut, Ohio, U.S.
- Batted: Right Threw: Right

MLB debut
- August 20, 1974, for the Detroit Tigers

Last MLB appearance
- September 30, 1984, for the Oakland Athletics

MLB statistics
- Batting average: .243
- Home runs: 3
- Runs batted in: 71
- Stats at Baseball Reference

Teams
- Detroit Tigers (1976–1980); Texas Rangers (1981–1983); Oakland Athletics (1984)

Mark Duane Wagner (born March 4, 1954) is an American former professional baseball infielder. He played nine years in Major League Baseball for the Detroit Tigers (1976–1980), Texas Rangers (1981–1983), and Oakland Athletics (1984).

== Early years ==
Wagner was born in 1954 in Conneaut, Ohio. He attended Harbor High School in Ashtabula, Ohio.

== Professional baseball ==
=== Minor leagues ===
He was drafted by the Detroit Tigers in the 1972 amateur draft. He played several years in the minor leagues for the Bristol Tigers in 1972, the Clinton Pilots in 1973, the Lakeland Tigers in 1974, the Clinton Pilots in 1975, and the Evansville Triplets in 1976 and 1977. He won MVP honors at Clinton in 1973.

Wagner was called up by the Tigers in August 1976 after Tom Veryzer sustained an ankle injury. Tagged as a "good field, no hit" player, Wagner impressed in his first week with the club, with hits in first two at bats, impressive defensive performance, and a game-winning run batted in off Goose Gossage. He appeared in 39 games with a .261 batting average.

In 1977, Wagner competed with Tom Veryzer for the starting shortstop position with the Tigers. Wagner appeared in only 22 games for the 1977 Tigers, tallying only seven hits in 48 at bats for a .146 batting average. He was sent back to Evansville, where he compiled career-highs in batting average (.306) and on-base percentage (.377) in 64 games.

=== Detroit Tigers ===
During the spring of 1978, Wagner was again in competition for the starting shortstop job, this time with rookie Alan Trammell. Wagner appeared in 39 games during the 1978 season, including 27 as the starter at shortstop, and compiled a .239 batting average. Trammell won the competition and went on to a Hall of Fame career over the next 20 years.

In 1979, Wagner appeared in 75 games, including 22 starts at shortstop and 22 starts at second base. His batting average improved to .274 with a .341 on-base percentage during the 1979 season. He never came close to those marks in the balance of his career. He appeared in 45 games for the Tigers in 1980, but his batting average dropped by 38 points to .236.

=== Texas Rangers ===
In December 1980, the Tigers traded Wagner to the Texas Rangers in exchange for relief pitcher Kevin Saucier. He spent the 1981 season as the Rangers' backup shortstop, appearing in 50 games and compiling a .254 batting average.

During 1982 spring training, Wagner beat out Mario Mendoza and began the season as the Rangers' starting shortstop. In April 1982, Steve Pate of the Fort Worth Star-Telegram wrote that Wagner was "playing some of the best shortstop in the history of the organization." On May 17, 1982, he was stretching prior to a game when he was hit on the back of the head by a baseball thrown by Chicago White Sox Jerry Koosman. The blow resulted in dizzy spells, nausea, and balance problems and was limited to one at bat over the next two weeks. Other injuries followed, including a bout of prostatitis. On July 9, his season ended as the result of and a pulled intestinal muscle.

Wagner reported to the team in 1983, but Bucky Dent won the starting shortstop job, and Texas manager Doug Rader declined to play him even as a backup. In March, Rader said, Maybe he's doing the best he can, but I've got to go by what I see. It doesn't look like he's running on all eight cylinders." As of late May, Wagner had not received a single moment of playing time. Wagner said he wanted to play, but Rader said "the situation hasn't come up where he would feel comfortable using Wagner."

=== Oakland A's ===
In November 1983, Wagner was not selected in the free agent re-entry draft. In April 1984, he signed as a free agent with the Oakland Athletics. He appeared in 82 games, including 19 games as the team's starting shortstop and seven as the starting third baseman. On August 20, 1984, he pitched the final 1 2/3 innings against the Detroit Tigers, giving up two hits and no runs in a 14–1 loss. He compiled a .230 batting average for Oakland and appeared in his final major league game at age 30 on September 30, 1984.

Over nine seasons in Major League Baseball, Wagner played in 414 games and had a .243 batting average, 205 hits, 81 runs scored, 71 runs batted in, 61 walks, 20 doubles, nine triples and three home runs. Defensively, he appeared in 408 games (327 at shortstop) and tallied 469 putouts, 852 assists, 154 double plays, 61 errors, and a .956 fielding percentage.
