= Wayne Tolleson =

American baseball player (born 1955)

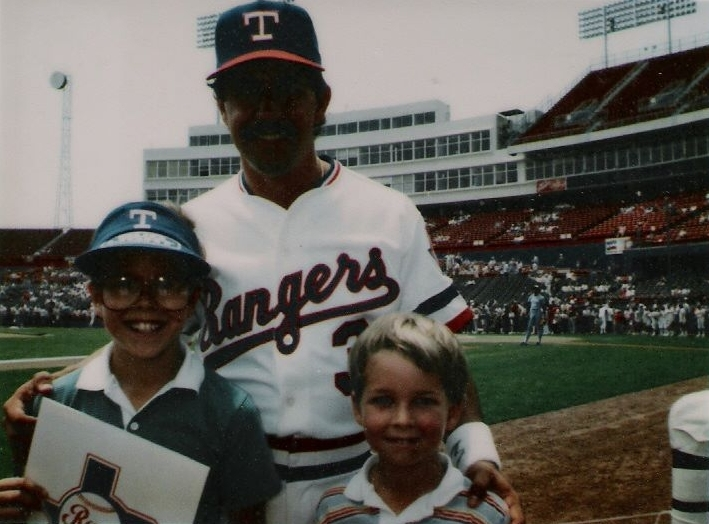
- Tolleson with the Texas Rangers
- Infielder
- Born: November 22, 1955 (age 70); Spartanburg, South Carolina, U.S.
- Batted: Switch Threw: Right

MLB debut
- September 1, 1981, for the Texas Rangers

Last MLB appearance
- September 30, 1990, for the New York Yankees

MLB statistics
- Batting average: .241
- Home runs: 9
- Runs batted in: 133
- Stats at Baseball Reference

Teams
- Texas Rangers (1981–1985); Chicago White Sox (1986); New York Yankees (1986–1990)

Jimmy Wayne Tolleson (born November 22, 1955) is an American former professional baseball infielder who played for the Texas Rangers, Chicago White Sox, and New York Yankees of Major League Baseball (MLB).

== Western Carolina University ==
A star high school athlete in both baseball and football, Tolleson said he chose to attend Western Carolina University over other schools because it was the only program that would allow him to play both sports "with no strings attached."

Tolleson first attracted the attention of baseball scouts while playing college ball at Western Carolina. During his college career, Tolleson set ten WCU season and career records, earning All-Southern Conference honors at shortstop in 1977 and 1978. In 1978, he was named Southern Conference Baseball Player of the Year, SoCon Athlete of the Year and was an All-NCAA Atlantic Region selection. He was also a member of the Southern Conference's 75th Anniversary team.

Tolleson was also a star football player at WCU, catching 105 passes for 1,747 yards and 14 touchdowns over two seasons. He was named All-Southern Conference as a wide receiver after leading both the conference and the NCAA Division I in receiving in 1977 with 73 catches for 1,101 yards and seven touchdowns. In 1977, he was WCU's emergency placekicker and was a perfect 6-of-6 on field goals, and connected on 22 of 24 extra point kicks.

At the first-ever Canadian-American Bowl in Tampa, Florida, Tolleson returned the opening kickoff. He was later named to WCU's All-20th Century Football Team and in 1990, was inducted into WCU's Athletics Hall of Fame.

== Texas Rangers ==
The Pittsburgh Pirates chose Tolleson in the 12th round of the 1977 Major League Baseball draft, but he decided to return to school for his senior year rather than sign with Pittsburgh. The Texas Rangers chose Tolleson with the 202nd pick of the 1978 Major League Baseball draft, and this time he signed.

After batting .261 with 36 stolen bases for the Wichita Aeros in 1981, Tolleson received a call up to the majors when rosters expanded that September. He debuted with the Rangers on September 1 against the Toronto Blue Jays, pinch hitting in the seventh inning and remaining in the game at shortstop.

He split 1982 between the Rangers and their Triple-AAA affiliate, the Denver Bears, and earned the starting second baseman job with the Rangers in 1983 and 1984.

He displayed excellent speed and good defense, totaling 55 stolen bases in the two seasons, but he also struggled to maintain an acceptable batting average and he never hit for much power.

Wayne was involved in a memorable 1983 bench clearing brawl at Arlington Stadium with California Angels player Bobby Grich.

In 1985, he shifted into a utility infielder role, receiving most of his playing time at short as the Rangers reacquired Toby Harrah to play second during the off season. Tolleson responded by batting .313 with a solid .733 On-base plus slugging Percentage, both career bests by far.

== Chicago White Sox and New York Yankees ==
Tolleson is often identified with the brief, disappointing tenure of Ken Harrelson as general manager of the Chicago White Sox, due to his involvement in two of Harrelson's iconic trades.

On November 25, 1985, the Rangers traded Tolleson and relief pitcher Dave Schmidt to the White Sox in exchange for shortstops Scott Fletcher and José Mota and pitching prospect Ed Correa.

He was a member of the White Sox for only a few months, as Chicago sent him to the New York Yankees in another deal on July 30, 1986. In addition to Tolleson, the White Sox shipped out former All-Star Ron Kittle and backup catcher Joel Skinner, acquiring first baseman/third baseman Carlos Martínez and catchers Ron Hassey and Bill Lindsey. Tolleson spent the rest of his career as a reserve for the Yankees, retiring in 1990.

== Personal life ==
Wayne and his wife Kimberly have two sons, Steve and Clint. Steve also played in Major League Baseball.

Wayne's father, Jim, played seven seasons in the minor leagues for the Cleveland Indians, Boston Red Sox and Detroit Tigers, and his brother, Michael, played one season in the Indians organization.
