= 2003 Texas Rangers season =

2003 Texas Rangers
- League: American League
- Division: West
- Ballpark: The Ballpark in Arlington
- City: Arlington, Texas
- Record: 71–91 (.438)
- Divisional place: 4th
- Owners: Tom Hicks
- General managers: John Hart
- Managers: Buck Showalter
- Television: KDFI; FSN Southwest (Tom Grieve, Josh Lewin)
- Radio: KRLD (Eric Nadel, Vince Cotroneo); KESS-FM (Eleno Ornelas, Edgar Lopez)

The 2003 Texas Rangers season was the 43rd of the Texas Rangers franchise overall, their 32nd in Arlington as the Rangers, and their 10th season at The Ballpark in Arlington. The Rangers finished fourth in the American League West with a record of 71 wins and 91 losses.

== Preseason ==
- October 3, 2002: John Rocker was released by the Rangers.
- December 6, 2002: Travis Hafner and Aaron Myette were traded by the Rangers to the Cleveland Indians for Einar Díaz and Ryan Drese.
- December 23, 2002: Ugueth Urbina was signed as a free agent with the Rangers.

== Regular season ==
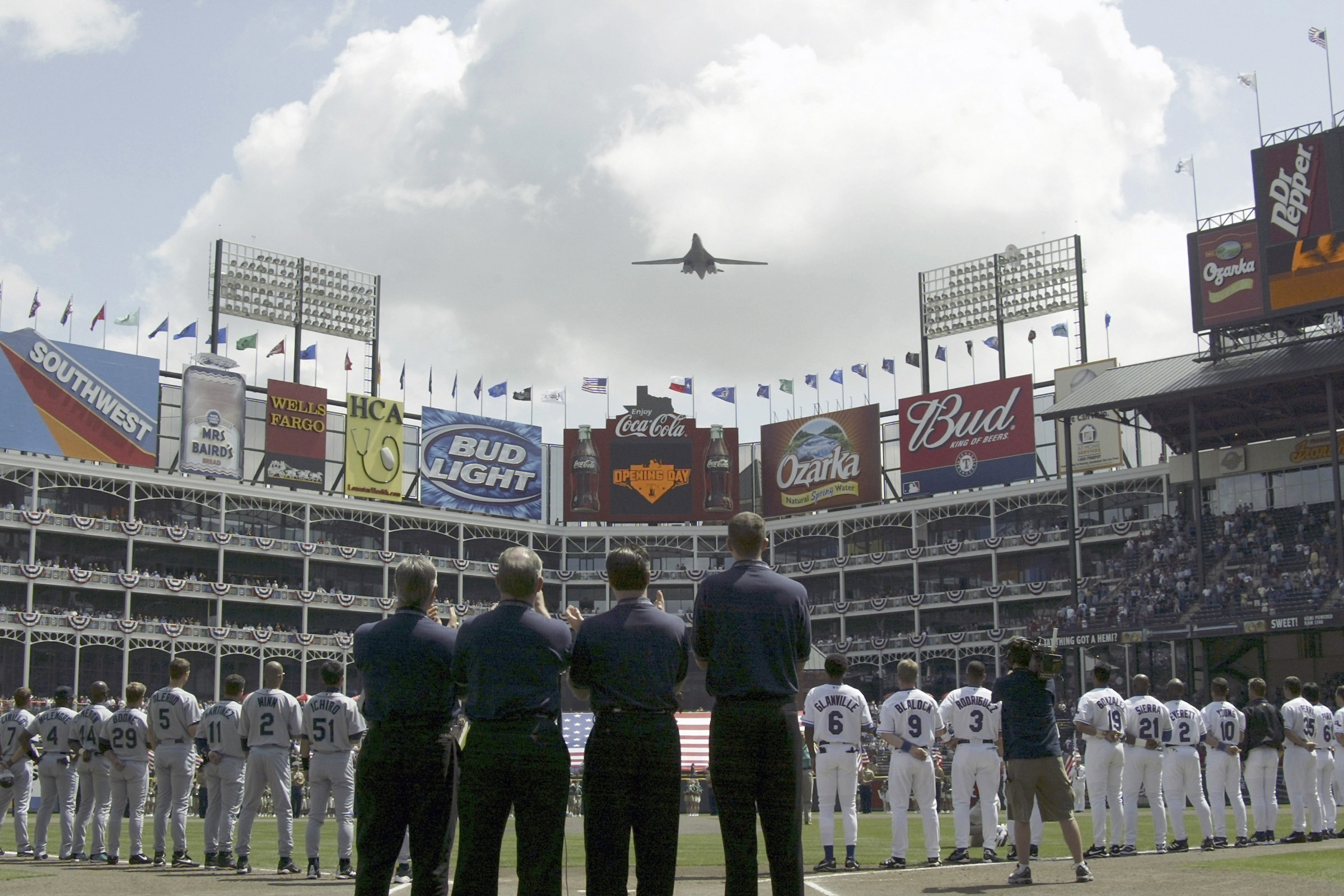
The Rangers home opener on April 4

=== Opening Day starters ===
- Einar Díaz, C
- Rafael Palmeiro, 1B
- Michael Young, 2B
- Hank Blalock, 3B
- Alex Rodriguez, SS
- Carl Everett, LF
- Doug Glanville, CF
- Juan González, RF
- Rubén Sierra, DH
- Ismael Valdez, RHP

=== Season standings ===
AL West
Team	W	L	Pct.	GB	Home	Road
Oakland Athletics	96	66	.593	—	57‍–‍24	39‍–‍42
Seattle Mariners	93	69	.574	3	50‍–‍31	43‍–‍38
Anaheim Angels	77	85	.475	19	45‍–‍37	32‍–‍48
Texas Rangers	71	91	.438	25	43‍–‍38	28‍–‍53

=== Record vs. opponents ===
2003 American League record Source: MLB Standings Grid – 2003
Team	ANA	BAL	BOS	CWS	CLE	DET	KC	MIN	NYY	OAK	SEA	TB	TEX	TOR	NL
Anaheim	—	1–8	3–6	3–4	6–3	6–1	6–3	5–4	3–6	8–12	8–11	6–3	9–10	2–7	11–7
Baltimore	8–1	—	9–10	2–4	3–3	3–3	3–4	3–4	6–13–1	2–7	4–5	8–11	7–2	8–11	5–13
Boston	6–3	10–9	—	5–4	4–2	8–1	5–1	2–4	9–10	3–4	5–2	12–7	5–4	10–9	11–7
Chicago	4–3	4–2	4–5	—	11–8	11–8	11–8	9–10	4–2	4–5	2–7	3–3	3–4	6–3	10–8
Cleveland	3–6	3–3	2–4	8–11	—	12–7	6–13	9–10	2–5	3–6	3–6	5–2	4–5	2–4	6–12
Detroit	1–6	3–3	1–8	8–11	7–12	—	5–14	4–15	1–5	3–6	1–8	2–4	1–6	2–7	4–14
Kansas City	3–6	4–3	1–5	8–11	13–6	14–5	—	11–8	2–4	2–7	4–5	4–3	7–2	1–5	9–9
Minnesota	4–5	4–3	4–2	10–9	10–9	15–4	8–11	—	0–7	8–1	3–6	6–0	5–4	3–3	10–8
New York	6–3	13–6–1	10–9	2–4	5–2	5–1	4–2	7–0	—	3–6	5–4	14–5	4–5	10–9	13–5
Oakland	12–8	7–2	4–3	5–4	6–3	6–3	7–2	1–8	6–3	—	7–12	6–3	15–4	5–2	9–9
Seattle	11–8	5–4	2–5	7–2	6–3	8–1	5–4	6–3	4–5	12–7	—	4–5	10–10	3–4	10–8
Tampa Bay	3–6	11–8	7–12	3–3	2–5	4–2	3–4	0–6	5–14	3–6	5–4	—	3–6	11–8	3–15
Texas	10–9	2–7	4–5	4–3	5–4	6–1	2–7	4–5	5–4	4–15	10–10	6–3	—	5–4	4–14
Toronto	7–2	11–8	9–10	3–6	4–2	7–2	5–1	3–3	9–10	2–5	4–3	8–11	4–5	—	10–8

=== Transactions ===
- May 9, 2003: Alan Benes was sent to the Texas Rangers by the Chicago Cubs as part of a conditional deal.
- June 3, 2003: Ian Kinsler was drafted by the Rangers in the 17th round of the 2003 amateur draft. Player signed June 24, 2003.
- July 11, 2003: Ugueth Urbina was traded by the Rangers to the Florida Marlins for Adrián González, Ryan Snare, and Will Smith (minors).

=== Roster ===
2003 Texas Rangers
Roster
Pitchers: 44 Alan Benes; 53 Joaquín Benoit; 36 Mickey Callaway; 31 Francisco Cordero; 17 Doug Davis; 45 R. A. Dickey; 41 Juan Dominguez; 37 Ryan Drese; 50 Robert Ellis; 38 Aaron Fultz; 57 Reynaldo Garcia; 56 Rosman García; 48 Colby Lewis; 32 Ron Mahay; 43 Tony Mounce; 50 C. J. Nitkowski; 61 Chan Ho Park; 39 Jay Powell; 54 Erasmo Ramirez; 40 Mario Ramos; 49 Víctor Santos; 58 Brian Shouse; 46 John Thomson; 41 Ugueth Urbina; 14 Ismael Valdez; 47 Todd Van Poppel; 43 Esteban Yan	Catchers: 5 Einar Díaz; 27,22 Todd Greene; 12 Chad Kreuter; 51 Gerald Laird; Infielders: 11,9 Hank Blalock; 13 Mike Lamb; 25 Rafael Palmeiro; 35 Herbert Perry; 3 Alex Rodriguez; 23 Mark Teixeira; 10 Michael Young	Outfielders: 16 Ryan Christenson; 24 Jermaine Clark; 2 Carl Everett; 6 Doug Glanville; 19 Juan González; 21 Jason Jones; 15 Ryan Ludwick; 28 Kevin Mench; 2 Ramón Nivar; 17 Laynce Nix; 4 Donnie Sadler; 21,38 Rubén Sierra; 47 Shane Spencer; 27 Marcus Thames	Manager: 11 Buck Showalter; Coaches: 52 Mark Connor (bullpen); 20 DeMarlo Hale (first base); 55 Orel Hershiser (pitching); 8 Rudy Jaramillo (hitting); 1 Steve Smith (third base); 18 Don Wakamatsu (bench)

== Player stats ==
=== Batting ===
==== Starters by position ====
Note: Pos = Position; G = Games played; AB = At bats; H = Hits; Avg. = Batting average; HR = Home runs; RBI = Runs batted in

Pos	Player	G	AB	H	Avg.	HR	RBI
C	Einar Diaz	101	334	86	.257	4	35
1B	Mark Teixeira	146	529	137	.259	26	84
2B	Michael Young	160	666	204	.306	14	72
SS	Alex Rodriguez	161	607	181	.298	47	118
3B	Hank Blalock	143	567	170	.300	29	90
LF	Shane Spencer	55	185	42	.227	4	23
CF	Ryan Christenson	60	165	29	.176	2	16
RF	Juan González	82	327	96	.294	24	70
DH	Rafael Palmeiro	154	561	146	.260	38	112

==== Other batters ====
Note: G = Games played; AB = At bats; H = Hits; Avg. = Batting average; HR = Home runs; RBI = Runs batted in

Player	G	AB	H	Avg.	HR	RBI
Carl Everett	74	270	74	.274	18	51
Todd Greene	62	205	47	.229	10	20
Doug Glanville	52	195	53	.272	4	14
Laynce Nix	53	184	47	.255	8	30
Rubén Sierra	43	133	35	.263	3	12
Donnie Sadler	77	131	26	.198	1	5
Kevin Mench	38	125	40	.320	2	11
Jason Jones	40	107	23	.215	3	11
Ramón Nivar	28	90	19	.211	0	7
Marcus Thames	30	73	15	.205	1	4
Jermaine Clark	24	46	8	.174	0	6
Gerald Laird	19	44	12	.273	1	4
Mike Lamb	28	38	5	.132	0	2
Ryan Ludwick	8	26	4	.154	0	0
Herbert Perry	11	24	4	.167	0	2
Chad Kreuter	7	18	2	.111	0	0

=== Pitching ===
==== Starting pitchers ====
Note: G = Games pitched; IP = Innings pitched; W = Wins; L = Losses; ERA = Earned run average; SO = Strikeouts

Player	G	IP	W	L	ERA	SO
John Thomson	35	217.0	13	14	4.85	136
Colby Lewis	26	127.0	10	9	7.30	88
Ismael Valdéz	22	115.0	8	8	6.10	47
Tony Mounce	11	50.2	1	5	7.11	30
Chan Ho Park	7	29.2	1	3	7.58	16
Robert Ellis	4	18.1	1	1	8.35	8
Alan Benes	4	15.0	0	3	11.40	11
Mario Ramos	3	13.0	1	1	6.23	8
Doug Davis	1	3.0	0	0	12.00	2

==== Other pitchers ====
Note: G = Games pitched; IP = Innings pitched; W = Wins; L = Losses; ERA = Earned run average; SO = Strikeouts

Player	G	IP	W	L	ERA	SO
R.A. Dickey	38	116.2	9	8	5.09	94
Joaquin Benoit	25	105.0	8	5	5.49	87
Ryan Drese	11	46.0	2	4	6.85	26
Víctor Santos	8	25.2	0	2	7.01	15
Mickey Callaway	6	22.1	0	3	6.45	19
Juan Domínguez	6	16.1	0	2	7.16	13
Todd Van Poppel	7	12.2	1	0	8.53	9

==== Relief pitchers ====
Note: G = Games pitched; W = Wins; L = Losses; SV = Saves; ERA = Earned run average; SO = Strikeouts

Player	G	W	L	SV	ERA	SO
Ugueth Urbina	39	0	4	26	4.19	41
Francisco Cordero	73	5	8	15	2.94	90
Aaron Fultz	64	1	3	0	5.21	53
Brian Shouse	62	0	1	1	3.10	40
Jay Powell	51	3	0	0	7.82	40
Rosman García	46	1	2	0	6.02	25
Ron Mahay	35	3	3	0	3.18	38
Erasmo Ramirez	34	3	1	0	3.86	28
Reynaldo Garcia	17	0	0	0	9.00	15
Esteban Yan	15	0	1	0	6.94	25
C.J. Nitkowski	6	0	0	0	7.45	5

== Awards and honors ==
- Alex Rodriguez, American League Most Valuable Player Award
- Alex Rodriguez, Hank Aaron Award
- Alex Rodriguez, A.L. Home Run Champ
- Alex Rodriguez, SS, AL Gold Glove
- Alex Rodriguez, Silver Slugger Award

All-Star Game

== Farm system ==
Level	Team	League	Manager
AAA	Oklahoma RedHawks	Pacific Coast League	Bobby Jones
AA	Frisco RoughRiders	Texas League	Tim Ireland
A	Stockton Ports	California League	Arnie Beyeler
A	Clinton LumberKings	Midwest League	Carlos Subero
A-Short Season	Spokane Indians	Northwest League	Darryl Kennedy
Rookie	AZL Rangers	Arizona League	Pedro López

LEAGUE CHAMPIONS: Spokane
