= 2002 Texas Rangers season =

2002 Texas Rangers
- League: American League
- Division: West
- Ballpark: The Ballpark in Arlington
- City: Arlington, Texas
- Record: 72–90 (.444)
- Divisional place: 4th
- Owners: Tom Hicks
- General managers: John Hart
- Managers: Jerry Narron
- Television: KDFW; KDFI; FSN Southwest (Tom Grieve, Josh Lewin)
- Radio: KRLD (Eric Nadel, Vince Cotroneo); KESS-FM (Eleno Ornelas, Edgar Lopez)

The 2002 Texas Rangers season was the 42nd of the Texas Rangers franchise overall, their 31st in Arlington as the Rangers, and their 9th season at The Ballpark in Arlington. The Rangers finished fourth in the American League West with a record of 72 wins and 90 losses.

== Preseason ==
- October 29, 2001: Edinson Vólquez was signed by the Rangers as an amateur free agent.
- November 26, 2001: Todd Van Poppel was signed as a free agent by the Rangers.
- December 13, 2001: John Vander Wal was traded by the San Francisco Giants to the New York Yankees for Jay Witasick.
- December 18, 2001: Dave Elder was traded by the Rangers to the Cleveland Indians for John Rocker.
- January 8, 2002: Juan González was signed as a free agent by the Rangers.
- February 28, 2002: Tony Mounce was signed as a free agent by the Rangers.
- March 19, 2002: Justin Duchscherer was traded by the Texas Rangers to the Oakland Athletics for Luis Vizcaíno.

== Regular season ==
=== Opening Day starters ===
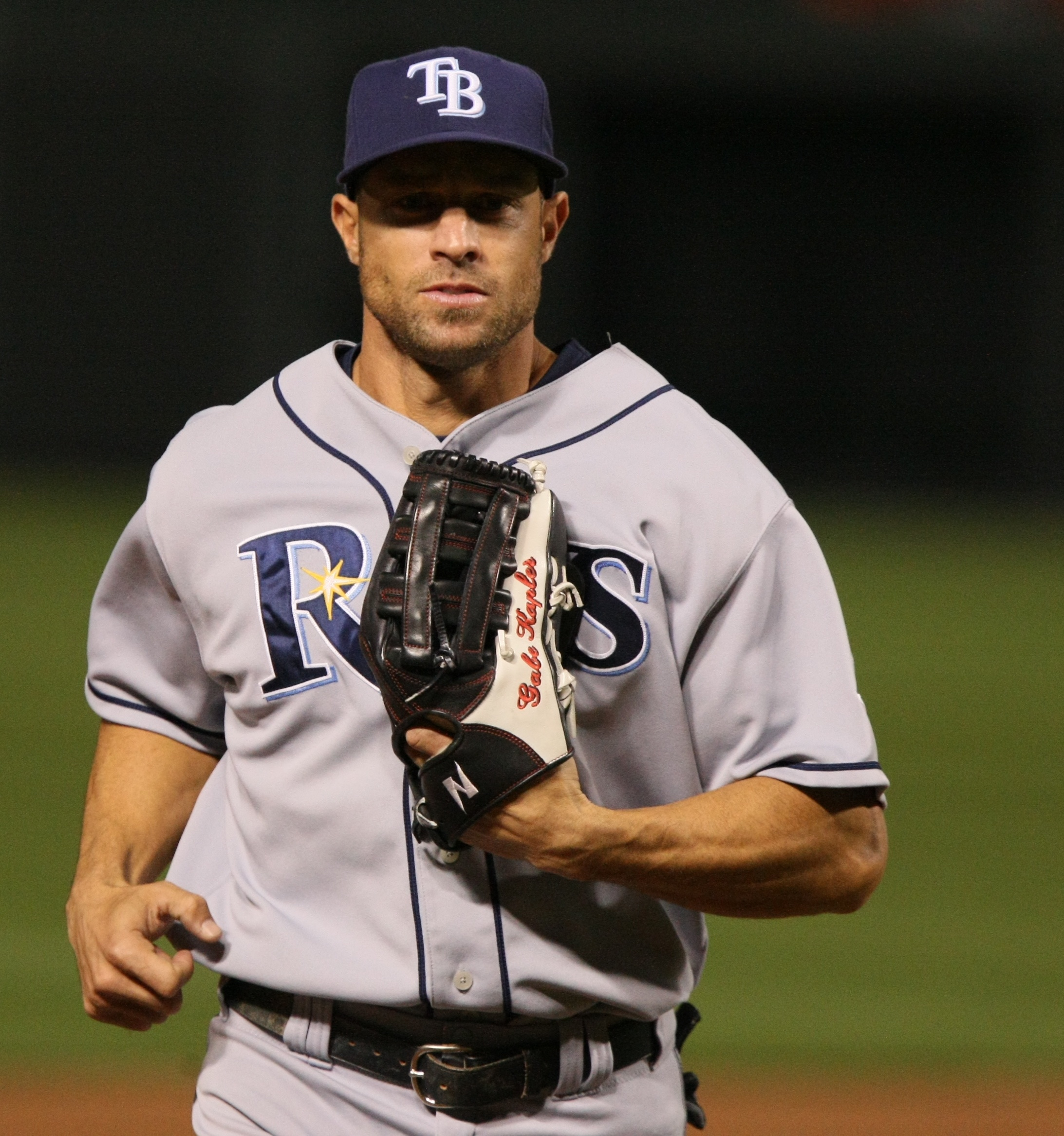
Gabe Kapler

- Iván Rodríguez, C
- Rafael Palmeiro, 1B
- Michael Young, 2B
- Hank Blalock, 3B
- Alex Rodriguez, SS
- Gabe Kapler, LF
- Carl Everett, CF
- Juan González, RF
- Frank Catalanotto, DH
- Chan Ho Park, RHP

=== Season summary ===
- Alex Rodriguez had a major league-best 57 HR, 142 RBI and 389 total bases in 2002, becoming the first player to lead the majors in all three categories since 1984. He had the 6th-most home runs in AL history, the most since Roger Maris' league record 61 in 1961, and the most ever for a shortstop for the 2nd straight year while also winning his first Gold Glove Award, awarded for outstanding defense.
- The 109 home runs hit by Alex Rodriguez in 2001–02 are the most ever by an American League right-handed batter in consecutive seasons. However, the Rangers finished last in the AL Western division in both years, a showing that likely cost Rodriguez the MVP award in 2002 when he finished second to fellow shortstop Miguel Tejada, whose 103-win Oakland A's won the same division.
- The Rangers set the Major League record for most consecutive games with at least one home run, with 27, which eventually was broken in 2019 by the New York Yankees.

=== Season standings ===
AL West
Team	W	L	Pct.	GB	Home	Road
Oakland Athletics	103	59	.636	—	54‍–‍27	49‍–‍32
Anaheim Angels	99	63	.611	4	54‍–‍27	45‍–‍36
Seattle Mariners	93	69	.574	10	48‍–‍33	45‍–‍36
Texas Rangers	72	90	.444	31	42‍–‍39	30‍–‍51

=== American League Wild Card ===
Division leaders
Team	W	L	Pct.
New York Yankees	103	58	.640
Minnesota Twins	94	67	.584
Oakland Athletics	103	59	.636

Wild Card team (Top team qualifies for postseason)
Team	W	L	Pct.	GB
Anaheim Angels	99	63	.611	—
Boston Red Sox	93	69	.574	6
Seattle Mariners	93	69	.574	6
Chicago White Sox	81	81	.500	18
Toronto Blue Jays	78	84	.481	21
Cleveland Indians	74	88	.457	25
Texas Rangers	72	90	.444	27
Baltimore Orioles	67	95	.414	32
Kansas City Royals	62	100	.383	37
Detroit Tigers	55	106	.342	43½
Tampa Bay Devil Rays	55	106	.342	43½

=== Record vs. opponents ===
2002 American League record Source: MLB Standings Grid – 2002
Team	ANA	BAL	BOS	CWS	CLE	DET	KC	MIN	NYY	OAK	SEA	TB	TEX	TOR	NL
Anaheim	—	7–2	3–4	6–3	6–3	8–1	6–3	4–5	3–4	9–11	9–10	8–1	12–7	7–2	11–7
Baltimore	2–7	—	6–13	3–4	1–5	2–4	7–0	5–1	6–13	4–5	5–4	10–9	3–6	4–15	9–9
Boston	4–3	13–6	—	2–4	5–4	5–4	4–2	3–3	9–10	6–3	4–5	16–3	4–3	13–6	5–13
Chicago	3–6	4–3	4–2	—	9–10	12–7	11–8	8–11	2–4	2–7	5–4	4–3	5–4	4–2	8–10
Cleveland	3–6	5–1	4–5	10–9	—	10–9	9–10	8–11	3–6	2–5	3–4	4–2	4–5	3–3	6–12
Detroit	1–8	4–2	4–5	7–12	9–10	—	9–10	4–14	1–8	1–6	2–5	2–4	5–4	0–6	6–12
Kansas City	3–6	0–7	2–4	8–11	10–9	10–9	—	5–14	1–5	1–8	3–6	4–2	7–2	3–4	5–13
Minnesota	5–4	1–5	3–3	11–8	11–8	14–4	14–5	—	0–6	3–6	5–4	5–2	6–3	6–1	10–8
New York	4–3	13–6	10–9	4–2	6–3	8–1	5–1	6–0	—	5–4	4–5	13–5	4–3	10–9	11–7
Oakland	11–9	5–4	3–6	7–2	5–2	6–1	8–1	6–3	4–5	—	8–11	8–1	13–6	3–6	16–2
Seattle	10–9	4–5	5–4	4–5	4–3	5–2	6–3	4–5	5–4	11–8	—	5–4	13–7	6–3	11–7
Tampa Bay	1–8	9–10	3–16	3–4	2–4	4–2	2–4	2–5	5–13	1–8	4–5	—	4–5	8–11	7–11
Texas	7–12	6–3	3–4	4–5	5–4	4–5	2–7	3–6	3–4	6–13	7–13	5–4	—	8–1	9–9
Toronto	2–7	15–4	6–13	2–4	3–3	6–0	4–3	1–6	9–10	6–3	3–6	11–8	1–8	—	9–9

=== Transactions ===
- July 31, 2002: Gabe Kapler, Jason Romano and cash were traded by the Rangers to the Colorado Rockies for Dennys Reyes and Todd Hollandsworth.

=== Roster ===
2002 Texas Rangers
Roster
Pitchers: 51 Juan Alvarez; 30 Rob Bell; 53 Joaquín Benoit; 16 Dave Burba; 31 Francisco Cordero; 17 Doug Davis; 50 Randy Flores; 41 Reynaldo Garcia; 45 Hideki Irabu; 52 Dan Kolb; 56 Ben Kozlowski; 48 Colby Lewis; 32 Dan Miceli; 54 Chris Michalak; 38 Aaron Myette; 50 C. J. Nitkowski; 61 Chan Ho Park; 39 Jay Powell; 46 Dennys Reyes; 49 John Rocker; 44 Rich Rodriguez; 37 Kenny Rogers; 40 Rudy Seánez; 32 Anthony Telford; 14 Ismael Valdez; 43 Steve Woodard	Catchers: 23 Todd Greene; 33 Bill Haselman; 22 Héctor Ortiz; 7 Iván Rodríguez; Infielders: 12 Hank Blalock; 6 Travis Hafner; 16 Jason Hart; 13 Mike Lamb; 25 Rafael Palmeiro; 35 Herbert Perry; 3 Alex Rodriguez; 10 Michael Young	Outfielders: 27 Frank Catalanotto; 2 Carl Everett; 19 Juan González; 29 Rusty Greer; 21 Todd Hollandsworth; 18 Gabe Kapler; 15 Ryan Ludwick; 28 Kevin Mench; 21 Calvin Murray; 24 Rubén Rivera; 4 Jason Romano; 4 Donnie Sadler	Manager: 5 Jerry Narron; Coaches: 24 Oscar Acosta (pitching)(beginning of season-June 21); 11 Terry Francona (bench); 20 DeMarlo Hale (first base); 8 Rudy Jaramillo (hitting); 55 Orel Hershiser (pitching)(June 22-); 9 Jamie Quirk (bullpen); 1 Steve Smith (third base)

== Player stats ==
=== Batting ===
==== Starters by position ====
Note: Pos = Position; G = Games played; AB = At bats; H = Hits; Avg. = Batting average; HR = Home runs; RBI = Runs batted in

Pos	Player	G	AB	H	Avg.	HR	RBI
C	Iván Rodríguez	108	408	128	.314	19	60
1B	Rafael Palmeiro	155	546	149	.273	43	105
2B	Michael Young	156	573	150	.262	9	62
3B	Herbert Perry	132	450	124	.276	22	77
SS	Alex Rodriguez	162	624	187	.300	57	142
LF	Kevin Mench	110	366	95	.260	15	60
CF	Rubén Rivera	69	158	33	.209	4	14
RF	Juan González	70	277	78	.282	8	35
DH	Rusty Greer	51	199	59	.296	1	17

==== Other batters ====
Note: G = Games played; AB = At bats; H = Hits; Avg. = Batting average; HR = Home runs; RBI = Runs batted in

Player	G	AB	H	Avg.	HR	RBI
Carl Everett	105	374	100	.267	16	62
Mike Lamb	115	314	89	.283	9	33
Frank Catalanotto	68	212	57	.269	3	23
Gabe Kapler	72	196	51	.260	0	17
Bill Haselman	69	179	44	.246	3	18
Hank Blalock	49	147	31	.211	3	17
Todd Hollandsworth	39	132	34	.258	5	19
Todd Greene	42	112	30	.268	10	19
Ryan Ludwick	23	81	19	.235	1	9
Calvin Murray	37	77	13	.169	0	1
Travis Hafner	23	62	15	.242	1	6
Jason Romano	29	54	11	.204	0	4
Donnie Sadler	38	30	3	.100	0	2
Jason Hart	10	15	4	.267	0	0
Héctor Ortiz	7	14	3	.214	1	2

=== Pitching ===
==== Starting pitchers ====
Note: G = Games pitched; IP = Innings pitched; W = Wins; L = Losses; ERA = Earned run average; SO = Strikeouts

Player	G	IP	W	L	ERA	SO
Kenny Rogers	33	210.2	13	8	3.84	107
Ismael Valdéz	23	146.2	6	9	3.93	75
Chan-Ho Park	25	145.2	9	8	5.75	121
Dave Burba	23	111.1	4	5	5.42	70
Rob Bell	17	94.0	4	3	6.22	70
Joaquín Benoit	17	84.2	4	5	5.31	59
Doug Davis	10	59.2	3	5	4.98	28
Ben Kozlowski	2	10.0	0	0	6.30	6

==== Other pitchers ====
Note: G = Games pitched; IP = Innings pitched; W = Wins; L = Losses; ERA = Earned run average; SO = Strikeouts

Player	G	IP	W	L	ERA	SO
Aaron Myette	15	48.1	2	5	10.06	48
Dennys Reyes	15	42.1	4	3	6.38	29
Colby Lewis	15	34.1	1	3	6.29	28

==== Relief pitchers ====
Note: G = Games pitched; IP = Innings pitched; W = Wins; L = Losses; SV = Saves; ERA = Earned run average; SO = Strikeouts

Player	G	IP	W	L	SV	ERA	SO
Hideki Irabu	38	47.0	3	8	16	5.74	30
Todd Van Poppel	50	72.2	3	2	1	5.45	85
Jay Powell	51	49.2	3	2	0	3.44	35
Francisco Cordero	39	45.1	2	0	10	1.79	41
Juan Alvarez	52	39.2	0	4	0	4.76	30
Rudy Seánez	33	33.0	1	3	0	5.73	40
Danny Kolb	34	32.0	3	6	1	4.22	20
John Rocker	30	24.1	2	3	1	6.66	30
Anthony Telford	20	23.2	2	1	1	6.46	19
Steve Woodard	14	17.2	0	0	0	6.62	14
Rich Rodriguez	36	16.2	3	2	1	5.40	12
Chris Michalak	13	14.1	0	2	0	4.40	5
C.J. Nitkowski	12	13.2	0	1	0	2.63	14
Randy Flores	20	12.0	0	0	1	4.50	7
Dan Miceli	9	8.1	0	2	0	8.64	5
Reynaldo Garcia	3	2.0	0	0	0	31.50	2

== Awards and honors ==
- Alex Rodriguez, Hank Aaron Award
- Alex Rodriguez, A.L. Home Run Champ
- Alex Rodriguez, SS, AL Gold Glove
- Alex Rodriguez, Silver Slugger Award,
- Kenny Rogers, P, Gold Glove,

All-Star Game

== Farm system ==
Level	Team	League	Manager
AAA	Oklahoma RedHawks	Pacific Coast League	Bobby Jones
AA	Tulsa Drillers	Texas League	Tim Ireland
A	Charlotte Rangers	Florida State League	Darryl Kennedy
A	Savannah Sand Gnats	South Atlantic League	Paul Carey
Rookie	Pulaski Rangers	Appalachian League	Pedro López
Rookie	GCL Rangers	Gulf Coast League	Carlos Subero

LEAGUE CHAMPIONS: Charlotte
