= 2004 Texas Rangers season =

2004 Texas Rangers
- League: American League
- Division: West
- Ballpark: Ameriquest Field in Arlington
- City: Arlington, Texas
- Record: 89–73 (.549)
- Divisional place: 3rd
- Owners: Tom Hicks
- General managers: John Hart
- Managers: Buck Showalter
- Television: KDFI; KDFW; FSN Southwest (Tom Grieve, Josh Lewin)
- Radio: KRLD (Eric Nadel, Victor Rojas); KFLC (Eleno Ornelas, José Guzmán)

The 2004 Texas Rangers season was the 44th of the Texas Rangers franchise overall, their 33rd in Arlington as the Rangers, and their 11th season at The Ballpark in Arlington. The Rangers finished the season third in the American League West with an 89–73 record, their first winning season since 1999. Five Rangers were All Stars, Francisco Cordero, Kenny Rogers, Hank Blalock, Michael Young and All-Star Game MVP Alfonso Soriano.

== Offseason ==
- October 8, 2003: Tony Mounce was released by the Rangers.
- November 19, 2003: Ken Huckaby was signed as a free agent with the Texas Rangers.
- February 5, 2004: Mike Lamb was traded by the Texas Rangers to the New York Yankees for Jose Garcia (minors).
- February 16, 2004: Alex Rodriguez was traded by the Texas Rangers with cash to the New York Yankees for a player to be named later and Alfonso Soriano. The New York Yankees sent Joaquin Arias (April 23, 2004) to the Texas Rangers to complete the trade.

== Regular season ==
=== Opening Day starters ===
- Gerald Laird, C
- Mark Teixeira, 1B
- Alfonso Soriano, 2B
- Hank Blalock, 3B
- Michael Young, SS
- David Dellucci, LF
- Laynce Nix, CF
- Kevin Mench, RF
- Brad Fullmer, DH
- Kenny Rogers, LHP

=== Season summary ===
- May 8: Alfonso Soriano set a club record with six hits in nine innings in a 16–15, 10-inning victory over the Detroit Tigers. The game featured an hour-long fifth inning: up by two runs entering the inning, Detroit scored eight runs in the top half of the inning to take a ten run lead over the Rangers; the Rangers would score ten runs in the bottom half of the inning to tie the game (the largest deficit ever overcome by the Rangers and tying an MLB record for most runs in an inning by two teams).
- October 1: In a game against the Texas Rangers, Ichiro Suzuki set an MLB record for most hits in one season.

=== Season standings ===
AL West
Team	W	L	Pct.	GB	Home	Road
Anaheim Angels	92	70	.568	—	45‍–‍36	47‍–‍34
Oakland Athletics	91	71	.562	1	52‍–‍29	39‍–‍42
Texas Rangers	89	73	.549	3	51‍–‍30	38‍–‍43
Seattle Mariners	63	99	.389	29	38‍–‍44	25‍–‍55

=== Record vs. opponents ===
2004 American League record Source: MLB Standings Grid – 2004
Team	ANA	BAL	BOS	CWS	CLE	DET	KC	MIN	NYY	OAK	SEA	TB	TEX	TOR	NL
Anaheim	—	6–3	4–5	5–4	4–5	7–2	7–0	5–4	5–4	10–9	13–7	6–1	9–10	4–5	7–11
Baltimore	3–6	—	10–9	2–4	3–3	6–0	6–3	4–5	5–14	0–7	7–2	11–8	5–2	11–8	5–13
Boston	5–4	9–10	—	4–2	3–4	6–1	4–2	2–4	11–8	8–1	5–4	14–5	4–5	14–5	9–9
Chicago	4–5	4–2	2–4	—	10–9	8–11	13–6	9–10	3–4	2–7	7–2	4–2	6–3	3–4	8–10
Cleveland	5–4	3–3	4–3	9–10	—	9–10	11–8	7–12	2–4	6–3	5–4	3–3	1–8	5–2	10–8
Detroit	2–7	0–6	1–6	11–8	10–9	—	8–11	7–12	4–3	4–5	5–4	3–3	4–5	4–2	9–9
Kansas City	0–7	3–6	2–4	6–13	8–11	11–8	—	7–12	1–5	2–7	2–5	3–6	4–5	3–3	6–12
Minnesota	4–5	5–4	4–2	10–9	12–7	12–7	12–7	—	2–4	2–5	5–4	4–5	5–2	4–2	11–7
New York	4–5	14–5	8–11	4–3	4–2	3–4	5–1	4–2	—	7–2	6–3	15–4	5–4	12–7	10–8
Oakland	9–10	7–0	1–8	7–2	3–6	5–4	7–2	5–2	2–7	—	11–8	7–2	11–9	6–3	10–8
Seattle	7–13	2–7	4–5	2–7	4–5	4–5	5–2	4–5	3–6	8–11	—	2–5	7–12	2–7	9–9
Tampa Bay	1–6	8–11	5–14	2–4	3–3	3–3	6–3	5–4	4–15	2–7	5–2	—	2–7	9–9	15–3
Texas	10–9	2–5	5–4	3–6	8–1	5–4	5–4	2–5	4–5	9–11	12–7	7–2	—	7–2	10–8
Toronto	5–4	8–11	5–14	4–3	2–5	2–4	3–3	2–4	7–12	3–6	7–2	9–9	2–7	—	8–10

=== Notable transactions ===
- July 6, 2004: Ken Huckaby was selected off waivers by the Baltimore Orioles from the Texas Rangers.
- August 18, 2004: Ken Huckaby was signed as a free agent with the Texas Rangers.

=== Roster ===
2004 Texas Rangers
Roster
Pitchers: 40 Carlos Almanzar; 51 Mike Bacsik; 53 Joaquín Benoit; 51 Nick Bierbrodt; 46 Doug Brocail; 36 Mickey Callaway; 31 Francisco Cordero; 45 R. A. Dickey; 41 Juan Dominguez; 38 Ryan Drese; 19 Scott Erickson; 50 Frank Francisco; 56 Rosman García; 57 Travis Hughes; 48 Colby Lewis; 44 Kameron Loe; 32 Ron Mahay; 49 Sam Narron; 43 Jeff Nelson; 61 Chan Ho Park; 39 Jay Powell; 54 Erasmo Ramirez; 57 Nick Regilio; 30 Ricardo Rodríguez; 37 Kenny Rogers; 58 Brian Shouse; 49 Ryan Snare; 56 Michael Tejera; 47 John Wasdin; 49 Chris Young	Catchers: 5 Danny Ardoin; 27 Rod Barajas; 15 Ken Huckaby; 6 Gerald Laird; Infielders: 4 Manny Alexander; 9 Hank Blalock; 5 Andy Fox; 20 Brad Fullmer; 24 Adrián González; 35 Herbert Perry; 12 Alfonso Soriano; 23 Mark Teixeira; 10 Michael Young	Outfielders: 13 Chad Allen; 19 Jason Conti; 22 David Dellucci; 33 Brian Jordan; 14 Gary Matthews, Jr.; 28 Kevin Mench; 2 Ramón Nivar; 17 Laynce Nix; 7 Eric Young	Manager: 11 Buck Showalter; Coaches: 52 Mark Connor (bullpen); 20 DeMarlo Hale (first base); 55 Orel Hershiser (pitching); 8 Rudy Jaramillo (hitting); 1 Steve Smith (third base); 18 Don Wakamatsu (bench)

=== Game log ===
2004 game log
April: 13–9

#	Date	Opponent	Score	Win	Loss	Save	Attendance	Record
1	April 5	@ Athletics	5–4	Bradford (1–0)	Nelson (0–1)	Rhodes (1)	45,122	0–1
2	April 6	@ Athletics	3–1	Mulder (1–0)	Park (0–1)	Rhodes (2)	13,217	0–2
3	April 7	@ Athletics	2–1	Lewis (1–0)	Zito (0–1)	Cordero (1)	20,232	1–2
4	April 9	Angels	12–4	Dickey (1–0)	Ortiz (0–1)		50,370	2–2
5	April 10	Angels	12–6	Rogers (1–0)	Lackey (0–1)		30,331	3–2
6	April 11	Angels	7–2	Colón (2–0)	Park (0–2)		18,209	3–3
7	April 12	Angels	7–6	Almanzar (1–0)	Washburn (1–1)	Cordero (2)	18,156	4–3
8	April 13	Athletics	10–9	Zito (1–1)	Callaway (0–1)	Rhodes (4)	20,112	4–4
9	April 14	Athletics	9–4	Redman (1–0)	Dickey (1–1)		24,093	4–5
10	April 15	Athletics	7–2	Rogers (2–0)	Harden (0–1)		22,605	5–5
11	April 16	@ Mariners	5–0	Park (1–2)	Meche (0–2)		35,647	6–5
12	April 17	@ Mariners	4–1	Moyer (1–1)	Lewis (1–1)	Guardado (1)	38,925	6–6
13	April 18	@ Mariners	4–2	Piñeiro (1–1)	Ramirez (0–1)	Guardado (2)	35,182	6–7
14	April 20	@ Angels	6–3	Rogers (3–0)	Ortiz (0–2)	Cordero (3)	33,892	7–7
15	April 21	@ Angels	4–1	Dickey (2–1)	Lackey (0–3)	Cordero (4)	36,689	8–7
16	April 22	@ Angels	7–5	Colón (3–1)	Park (1–3)	Percival (3)	30,725	8–8
17	April 23	Mariners	10–8	Drese (1–0)	Piñeiro (1–2)	Cordero (5)	28,020	9–8
18	April 24	Mariners	3–0	Powell (1–0)	García (0–1)	Nelson (1)	28,479	10–8
19	April 25	Mariners	14–6	Almanzar (2–0)	Franklin (1–1)		31,110	11–8
20	April 27	@ Royals	3–2	Dickey (3–1)	Affeldt (0–2)	Cordero (6)	15,529	12–8
21	April 28	@ Royals	5–3	Gobble (1–0)	Rogers (3–1)	MacDougal (1)	15,530	12–9
22	April 29	@ Royals	9–7	Almanzar (3–0)	Leskanic (0–3)	Cordero (7)	13,663	13–9
--	April 30	Postponed						13–9

May: 14–13

#	Date	Opponent	Score	Win	Loss	Save	Attendance	Record
23	May 1	Red Sox	4–3	Ramirez (1–1)	Malaska (1–1)	Cordero (8)	N/A	14–9
24	May 1	Red Sox	8–5	Benoit (1–0)	Martínez (3–2)	Cordero (9)	44,598	15–9
25	May 2	Red Sox	4–1	Dickey (4–1)	Tim Wakefield (2–1)	Cordero (10)	31,538	16–9
26	May 3	Devil Rays	9–0	Rogers (4–1)	Abbott (2–3)		18,116	17–9
27	May 4	Devil Rays	5–4	Carter (1–1)	Nelson (0–2)	Báez (3)	20,228	17–10
28	May 5	Devil Rays	6–1	Drese (2–0)	Waechter (1–2)		21,082	18–10
29	May 7	Tigers	8–7	Levine (3–2)	Ramirez (1–2)	Urbina (3)	41,095	18–11
30	May 8	Tigers	16–15	Cordero (1–0)	Urbina (1–1)		45,017	19–11
31	May 9	Tigers	5–3	Robertson (2–2)	Rogers (4–2)	Urbina (4)	25,034	19–12
32	May 11	@ Devil Rays	5–4	Ramirez (2–2)	Waechter (1–3)	Cordero (11)	10,389	20–12
33	May 12	@ Devil Rays	9–8	Park (2–3)	Halama (0–1)	Cordero (12)	10,202	21–12
34	May 13	@ Devil Rays	6–3	Hendrickson (2–3)	Dickey (4–2)	Báez (4)	10,234	21–13
35	May 14	@ Tigers	7–1	Knotts (1–0)	Benoit (1–1)	Yan (2)	22,449	21–14
36	May 15	@ Tigers	6–1	Rogers (5–2)	Robertson (2–3)		26,120	22–14
37	May 16	@ Tigers	3–1	Johnson (2–5)	Drese (2–1)	Urbina (6)	21,615	22–15
38	May 18	Royals	7–6	Sullivan (3–0)	Dickey (4–3)	Field (1)	26,247	22–16
39	May 19	Royals	5–3	Gobble (2–2)	Park (2–4)	Huisman (1)	32,374	22–17
40	May 20	Royals	6–3	Rogers (6–2)	May (1–6)	Cordero (13)	25,149	23–17
41	May 21	Yankees	9–7	Benoit (2–1)	Brown (5–1)	Cordero (14)	49,195	24–17
42	May 22	Yankees	4–3	Almanzar (4–0)	Gordon (1–2)		49,458	25–17
43	May 23	Yankees	8–3	Vázquez (4–4)	Dickey (4–4)		50,241	25–18
44	May 25	@ White Sox	7–4	Rogers (7–2)	Schoeneweis (4–2)	Cordero (15)	22,359	26–18
45	May 26	@ White Sox	4–0	Loaiza (6–3)	Benoit (2–2)		18,185	26–19
46	May 27	@ White Sox	9–0	Buehrle (5–1)	Drese (2–2)		14,428	26–20
47	May 28	@ Blue Jays	5–4	Lilly (3–2)	Dickey (4–5)	Frasor (3)	16,394	26–21
48	May 29	@ Blue Jays	6–2	Batista (3–4)	Dominguez (0–1)		30,704	26–22
49	May 30	@ Blue Jays	4–2	Rogers (8–2)	Miller (1–1)	Cordero (16)	22,225	27–22

June: 17–9

#	Date	Opponent	Score	Win	Loss	Save	Attendance	Record
50	June 1	@ Indians	6–5	Ramirez (3–2)	White (2–1)	Cordero (17)	17,136	28–22
51	June 2	@ Indians	5–3	Almanzar (5–0)	Betancourt (2–4)	Cordero (18)	18,098	29–22
52	June 4	@ Yankees	7–6	Brown (7–1)	Powell (1–1)	Rivera (22)	49,372	29–23
53	June 5	@ Yankees	8–1	Dominguez (1–1)	Lieber (4–3)		51,910	30–23
54	June 6	@ Yankees	2–1	Mussina (7–4)	Drese (2–3)	Rivera (23)	54,092	30–24
55	June 7	Pirates	6–5	Cordero (2–0)	Johnston (0–3)		25,286	31–24
--	June 8	Postponed						
--	June 9	Postponed						
56	June 10	Pirates	9–7	Francisco (1–0)	Meadows (2–2)	Cordero (19)	N/A	32–24
57	June 10	Pirates	10–4	Rogers (9–2)	Fogg (3–5)		27,219	33–24
58	June 11	Cardinals	12–7	Suppan (6–5)	Dominguez (1–2)		32,962	33–25
59	June 12	Cardinals	7–2	Drese (3–3)	Carpenter (7–2)		42,173	34–25
60	June 13	Cardinals	3–2	Williams (4–6)	Dickey (4–6)		41,087	34–26
61	June 15	@ Reds	5–4	Jones (5–1)	Ramirez (3–3)		36,501	34–27
62	June 16	@ Reds	7–4	Norton (1–2)	Francisco (1–1)		39,114	34–28
63	June 17	@ Reds	4–3	Van Poppel (3–2)	Drese (3–4)	Graves (27)	40,383	34–29
64	June 18	@ Marlins	8–1	Wasdin (1–0)	Penny (6–5)		20,506	35–29
65	June 19	@ Marlins	7–6	Dickey (5–6)	Willis (6–4)	Cordero (20)	31,021	36–29
66	June 20	@ Marlins	4–2	Mahay (1–0)	Koch (0–1)		23,643	37–29
67	June 22	Mariners	10–2	Drese (4–4)	Nageotte (1–3)		32,364	38–29
68	June 23	Mariners	6–3	Bierbrodt (1–0)	Franklin (3–5)	Cordero (21)	30,418	39–29
69	June 24	Mariners	9–7	Shouse (1–0)	Moyer (6–3)		26,266	40–29
70	June 25	Astros	3–1	Rogers (10–2)	Miller (7–7)		46,088	41–29
71	June 26	Astros	8–7	Almanzar (6–0)	Miceli (3–3)	Cordero (22)	40,131	42–29
72	June 27	Astros	1–0	Oswalt (6–6)	Drese (4–5)	Lidge (4)	43,328	42–30
73	June 28	@ Mariners	8–5	Rodríguez (1–0)	Franklin (3–6)	Cordero (23)	28,253	43–30
74	June 29	@ Mariners	4–3	Piñeiro (4–8)	Benoit (2–3)	Guardado (15)	34,844	43–31
75	June 30	@ Mariners	9–6	Rogers (11–2)	Nageotte (1–4)	Cordero (24)	32,754	44–31

July: 13–14

#	Date	Opponent	Score	Win	Loss	Save	Attendance	Record
76	July 1	@ Mariners	8–4	Blackley (1–0)	Wasdin (1–1)		35,966	44–32
77	July 2	@ Astros	7–5	Oswalt (7–6)	Almanzar (6–1)	Lidge (5)	41,897	44–33
78	July 3	@ Astros	10–8	Weathers (6–4)	Brocail (0–1)	Miceli (1)	42,889	44–34
79	July 4	@ Astros	18–3	Benoit (3–3)	Pettitte (4–2)		41,147	45–34
80	July 5	@ Indians	8–5	Rogers (12–2)	Sabathia (5–4)	Cordero (25)	25,363	46–34
81	July 6	@ Indians	4–1	Lee (8–1)	Bierbrodt (1–1)	Riske (3)	16,796	46–35
82	July 7	@ Indians	9–8	Mahay (2–0)	Robertson (1–1)	Cordero (26)	18,499	47–35
83	July 8	@ Indians	10–0	Rodríguez (2–0)	Elarton (0–2)		24,914	48–35
84	July 9	@ Red Sox	7–0	Arroyo (3–7)	Benoit (3–4)		35,030	48–36
85	July 10	@ Red Sox	14–6	Lowe (7–8)	Rogers (12–3)		35,024	48–37
86	July 11	@ Red Sox	6–5	Shouse (2–0)	Foulke (2–2)	Cordero (27)	34,778	49–37
87	July 16	Blue Jays	11–2	Drese (5–5)	Halladay (7–7)		44,348	50–37
88	July 17	Blue Jays	4–0	Rodríguez (3–0)	Lilly (7–7)		43,189	51–37
89	July 18	Blue Jays	7–5	Brocail (1–1)	Chulk (0–1)	Cordero (28)	24,334	52–37
90	July 19	White Sox	12–6	Schoeneweis (6–7)	Benoit (3–5)		28,805	52–38
91	July 20	White Sox	6–4	Almanzar (7–1)	Marte (3–3)	Cordero (29)	27,308	53–38
92	July 21	Angels	3–2	Drese (6–5)	Escobar (5–7)	Cordero (30)	37,210	54–38
93	July 22	Angels	11–1	Colón (8–8)	Rodríguez (3–1)		23,308	54–39
94	July 23	@ Athletics	8–3	Rogers (13–3)	Mulder (13–3)		26,146	55–39
95	July 24	@ Athletics	6–2	Saarloos (2–1)	Dickey (5–7)		25,124	55–40
96	July 25	@ Athletics	9–2	Harden (5–5)	Wasdin (1–2)		25,354	55–41
97	July 26	@ Angels	6–1	Drese (7–5)	Escobar (5–8)		42,040	56–41
98	July 27	@ Angels	2–0	Colón (9–8)	Regilio (0–1)	Percival (16)	42,625	56–42
99	July 28	@ Angels	2–0	Lackey (9–9)	Rogers (13–4)	Percival (17)	41,133	56–43
100	July 29	Athletics	7–6	Bradford (5–4)	Almanzar (7–2)	Dotel (7)	31,174	56–44
101	July 30	Athletics	7–5	Francisco (2–1)	Bradford (5–5)	Cordero (31)	44,116	57–44
102	July 31	Athletics	9–4	Zito (7–7)	Drese (7–6)		50,708	57–45

August: 16–12

#	Date	Opponent	Score	Win	Loss	Save	Attendance	Record
103	August 1	Athletics	4–1	Redman (8–8)	Regilio (0–2)	Dotel (8)	32,646	57–46
104	August 3	@ Tigers	5–4	Francisco (3–1)	Robertson (9–6)	Cordero (32)	19,894	58–46
105	August 4	@ Tigers	8–0	Bacsik (1–0)	Johnson (8–9)		18,857	59–46
106	August 5	@ Tigers	2–1	Drese (8–6)	Yan (1–3)	Cordero (33)	25,710	60–46
107	August 6	@ Orioles	9–1	Bédard (5–6)	Regilio (0–3)		29,276	60–47
108	August 7	@ Orioles	3–1	López (9–7)	Erickson (0–1)	Julio (18)	44,961	60–48
109	August 8	@ Orioles	11–5	Ponson (7–12)	Rogers (13–5)		32,842	60–49
110	August 9	@ Orioles	7–3	Borkowski (3–2)	Bacsik (1–1)		39,850	60–50
111	August 10	Yankees	7–1	Drese (9–6)	Brown (9–2)		43,633	61–50
112	August 11	Yankees	4–2	Sturtze (4–2)	Regilio (0–4)	Rivera (39)	43,729	61–51
113	August 12	Yankees	5–1	Hernández (5–0)	Erickson (0–2)		48,925	61–52
114	August 13	Devil Rays	5–3	Rogers (14–5)	Bell (5–6)	Cordero (34)	30,266	62–52
115	August 14	Devil Rays	6–5	Brocail (2–1)	Núñez (0–1)	Cordero (35)	38,620	63–52
116	August 15	Devil Rays	6–2	Drese (10–6)	Sosa (3–2)		23,051	64–52
117	August 16	Indians	5–2	Ramirez (4–3)	Sabathia (9–7)	Cordero (36)	23,551	65–52
118	August 17	Indians	16–4	Erickson (1–2)	Lee (10–5)	Brocail (1)	24,864	66–52
119	August 18	Indians	5–2	Rogers (15–5)	Elarton (2–3)	Cordero (37)	31,572	67–52
120	August 20	@ Royals	5–3	Drese (11–6)	Wood (2–5)	Cordero (38)	17,385	68–52
121	August 21	@ Royals	5–3	Francisco (4–1)	Anderson (2–11)	Cordero (39)	25,035	69–52
122	August 22	@ Royals	10–2	Greinke (6–9)	Erickson (1–3)		22,286	69–53
123	August 23	Twins	7–4	Santana (14–6)	Rogers (15–6)		23,369	69–54
124	August 24	Twins	5–4	Cordero (3–0)	Nathan (1–2)		24,496	70–54
125	August 25	Twins	8–5	Lohse (7–10)	Drese (11–7)	Nathan (35)	25,332	70–55
126	August 26	Twins	8–3	Park (3–4)	Mulholland (4–7)		26,083	71–55
127	August 27	Orioles	6–4	Wasdin (2–2)	Bédard (5–9)	Cordero (40)	29,409	72–55
128	August 28	Orioles	4–3	Francisco (5–1)	Ryan (3–5)	Cordero (41)	41,676	73–55
129	August 29	Orioles	7–6	Ponson (9–13)	Young (0–1)	Julio (19)	30,577	73–56
130	August 31	@ Twins	8–5	Rincón (11–6)	Almanzar (7–3)		20,510	73–57

September/October: 16–16

#	Date	Opponent	Score	Win	Loss	Save	Attendance	Record
131	September 1	@ Twins	4–2	Crain (1–0)	Cordero (3–1)	Nathan (36)	21,480	73–58
132	September 2	@ Twins	2–0	Radke (10–7)	Rogers (15–7)	Nathan (37)	18,293	73–59
133	September 3	@ Red Sox	2–0	Martínez (15–5)	Wasdin (2–3)	Foulke (27)	35,151	73–60
134	September 4	@ Red Sox	8–6	Young (1–1)	Wakefield (11–8)	Cordero (42)	34,670	74–60
135	September 5	@ Red Sox	6–5	Schilling (18–6)	Drese (11–8)		34,652	74–61
136	September 6	White Sox	7–4	Grilli (1–1)	Park (3–5)		31,251	74–62
137	September 7	White Sox	10–3	Rogers (16–7)	Contreras (12–8)		20,004	75–62
138	September 8	White Sox	5–2	García (11–10)	Wasdin (2–4)	Takatsu (17)	21,836	75–63
139	September 9	White Sox	7–3	Buehrle (14–8)	Young (1–2)		19,384	75–64
140	September 10	Blue Jays	10–3	Drese (12–8)	Batista (10–11)		24,617	76–64
141	September 11	Blue Jays	10–7	Mahay (3–0)	Frasor (4–6)	Cordero (43)	40,587	77–64
142	September 12	Blue Jays	7–6	Brocail (3–1)	Speier (3–7)	Cordero (44)	20,434	78–64
143	September 13	@ Athletics	7–6	Duchscherer (6–6)	Cordero (3–2)		15,535	78–65
144	September 14	@ Athletics	12–9	Brocail (4–1)	Redman (10–12)		15,644	79–65
145	September 15	@ Athletics	10–3	Drese (13–8)	Mulder (17–5)		25,849	80–65
146	September 16	@ Athletics	5–4	Harden (10–6)	Rogers (16–8)	Dotel (21)	15,281	80–66
147	September 17	@ Angels	9–5	Colón (16–11)	Park (3–6)		43,343	80–67
148	September 18	@ Angels	2–0	Ramirez (5–3)	Escobar (10–11)	Cordero (45)	41,233	81–67
149	September 19	@ Angels	1–0	Young (2–2)	Washburn (11–8)	Cordero (46)	40,099	82–67
150	September 21	Athletics	9–4	Drese (14–8)	Mulder (17–6)		28,143	83–67
151	September 22	Athletics	5–3	Rogers (17–8)	Zito (11–11)	Cordero (47)	29,426	84–67
152	September 23	Athletics	5–4	Nelson (1–2)	Dotel (4–2)		23,075	85–67
153	September 24	Mariners	8–7	Villone (7–5)	Cordero (3–3)	Putz (9)	32,212	85–68
154	September 25	Mariners	5–4	Dickey (6–7)	Hasegawa (4–6)	Cordero (48)	48,048	86–68
155	September 26	Mariners	9–0	Baek (2–4)	Drese (14–9)		38,597	86–69
156	September 27	Angels	5–3	Colón (17–12)	Rogers (17–9)	Percival (31)	20,333	86–70
157	September 28	Angels	8–2	Escobar (11–12)	Park (3–7)		26,686	86–71
158	September 29	Angels	8–7	Shields (8–2)	Cordero (3–4)	Percival (32)	31,538	86–72
159	September 30	Angels	6–3	Young (3–2)	Lackey (14–13)	Dickey (1)	23,036	87–72
160	October 1	@ Mariners	8–3	Villone (8–6)	Drese (14–10)		45,573	87–73
161	October 2	@ Mariners	10–4	Rogers (18–9)	Moyer (7–13)		45,817	88–73
162	October 3	@ Mariners	3–0	Park (4–7)	Meche (7–7)	Cordero (49)	45,658	89–73

Source: ESPN.com

== Player stats ==
=== Batting ===
==== Starters by position ====
Note: Pos = Position; G = Games played; AB = At bats; H = Hits; Avg. = Batting average; HR = Home runs; RBI = Runs batted in

Pos	Player	G	AB	H	Avg.	HR	RBI
C	Rod Barajas	108	358	89	.249	15	58
1B	Mark Teixeira	145	545	153	.281	38	112
2B	Alphonso Soriano	145	608	170	.280	28	91
SS	Michael Young	160	690	216	.313	22	99
3B	Hank Blalock	159	624	172	.276	32	110
LF	David Dellucci	107	331	80	.242	17	61
CF	Laynce Nix	115	371	92	.248	14	46
RF	Kevin Mench	125	438	122	.279	26	71
DH	Brad Fullmer	76	258	60	.233	11	33

==== Other batters ====
Note: G = Games played; AB = At bats; H = Hits; Avg. = Batting average; HR = Home runs; RBI = Runs batted in

Player	G	AB	H	Avg.	HR	RBI
Eric Young Sr.	104	344	99	.288	1	27
Gary Matthews	87	280	77	.275	11	36
Brian Jordan	61	212	47	.222	5	23
Gerald Laird	49	147	33	.224	1	16
Herbert Perry	49	134	30	.224	5	17
Chad Allen	20	58	14	.241	0	6
Jason Conti	22	55	10	.182	0	4
Adrián González	16	42	10	.238	1	7
Ken Huckaby	16	38	5	.132	0	0
Manny Alexander	21	21	5	.238	0	3
Ramón Nivar	7	18	4	.222	0	4
Andy Fox	12	12	1	.083	0	0
Danny Ardoin	6	8	1	.125	0	1

=== Pitching ===
==== Starting pitchers ====
Note: G = Games pitched; IP = Innings pitched; W = Wins; L = Losses; ERA = Earned run average; SO = Strikeouts

Player	G	IP	W	L	ERA	SO
Kenny Rogers	35	211.2	18	9	4.76	126
Ryan Drese	34	207.2	14	10	4.20	98
Chan Ho Park	16	95.2	4	7	5.46	63
Chris Young	7	36.1	3	2	4.71	27
Ricardo Rodríguez	5	26.2	3	1	2.03	15
Juan Domínguez	4	23.0	1	2	3.91	14
Scott Erickson	4	19.0	1	3	6.16	6
Nick Bierbrodt	4	17.0	1	1	5.82	10
Mike Bacsik	3	15.2	1	1	4.60	6
Colby Lewis	3	15.1	1	1	4.11	11
Sam Narron	1	2.2	0	0	13.50	1

==== Other pitchers ====
Note: G = Games pitched; IP = Innings pitched; W = Wins; L = Losses; ERA = Earned run average; SO = Strikeouts

Player	G	IP	W	L	ERA	SO
R.A. Dickey	25	104.1	6	7	5.61	57
Joaquin Benoit	28	103.0	3	5	5.68	95
John Wasdin	15	65.0	2	4	6.78	36
Nick Regilio	6	19.1	0	4	6.05	12
Mickey Callaway	4	11.1	0	1	7.94	9
Kameron Loe	2	6.2	0	0	5.40	3

==== Relief pitchers ====
Note: G = Games pitched; W = Wins; L = Losses; SV = Saves; ERA = Earned run average; SO = Strikeouts

Player	G	W	L	SV	ERA	SO
Francisco Cordero	67	3	4	49	2.13	79
Carlos Almanzar	67	7	3	0	3.72	44
Ron Mahay	60	3	0	0	2.55	54
Brian Shouse	53	2	0	0	2.23	34
Frank Francisco	45	5	1	0	3.33	60
Doug Brocail	43	4	1	1	4.13	43
Erasmo Ramirez	34	5	3	0	4.29	21
Jeff Nelson	29	1	2	1	5.32	22
Jay Powell	23	1	1	0	3.38	17
Michael Tejera	6	0	0	0	10.13	7
Rosman García	4	0	0	0	5.40	5
Travis Hughes	2	0	0	0	13.50	4
Ryan Snare	1	0	0	0	10.80	0

== Awards and honors ==
- Alfonso Soriano, 2004 All-Star Game Most Valuable Player
- Alfonso Soriano, Second Base, Silver Slugger Award
- Kenny Rogers, Pitcher, Gold Glove Award
- Buck Showalter, American League Manager of the Year Award
- Mark Teixeira, First Base, Silver Slugger Award

All-Star Game

- Alfonso Soriano, second base, starter
- Francisco Cordero, pitcher, reserve
- Kenny Rogers, pitcher, reserve
- Hank Blalock, third base, reserve
- Michael Young, shortstop, reserve

Texas Rangers Hall of Fame Inductees

- Buddy Bell
- Ferguson Jenkins
- Tom Vandergriff (former Mayor of Arlington, who spearheaded the campaign to bring a Major League Baseball franchise to the Dallas–Fort Worth metroplex)

== Farm system ==
Level	Team	League	Manager
AAA	Oklahoma RedHawks	Pacific Coast League	Bobby Jones
AA	Frisco RoughRiders	Texas League	Tim Ireland
A	Stockton Ports	California League	Arnie Beyeler
A	Clinton LumberKings	Midwest League	Carlos Subero
A-Short Season	Spokane Indians	Northwest League	Darryl Kennedy
Rookie	AZL Rangers	Arizona League	Pedro López

LEAGUE CHAMPIONS: Frisco
