= Erasmo Ramirez =

Erasmo Ramirez may refer to:

- Erasmo Ramirez (left-handed pitcher) (born 1976), American Major League Baseball left-handed relief pitcher from 2003–2007
- Erasmo Ramírez (right-handed pitcher) (born 1990), Nicaraguan Major League Baseball right-handed pitcher
