= List of Baltimore Orioles managers =

In its 125-year history, the Baltimore Orioles baseball franchise of Major League Baseball's American League has employed 42 managers. The duties of the team manager include team strategy and leadership on and off the field. Of those 42 managers, 12 have been "player-managers"; specifically, they managed the team while still being signed as a player. Since 1992, the team has played its home games at Oriole Park at Camden Yards.

The Baltimore franchise began operations in Milwaukee, Wisconsin, as the Brewers (not to be confused with the current National League team of the same name) in 1901. After one season in Wisconsin under manager and Hall of Famer Hugh Duffy, the franchise moved south to St. Louis, Missouri, adopting the St. Louis Browns name and hiring a new manager, Jimmy McAleer. The Browns remained in Missouri until the end of the 1953 season, when Major League Baseball's owners elected to move the franchise to Baltimore, Maryland, where they were renamed the Orioles, after Maryland's state bird.

Seven managers have taken the Orioles franchise to the post-season; Earl Weaver led the Orioles to a team-record six playoff appearances. Weaver, Hank Bauer, and Joe Altobelli are the only managers who have won a World Series championship with the club: Bauer in the 1966 World Series, over the Los Angeles Dodgers; Weaver in the 1970 World Series, over the Cincinnati Reds; and Altobelli in the 1983 World Series, over the Philadelphia Phillies. Weaver is the longest-tenured manager in franchise history, with 2,541 games of service in parts of 17 seasons (1968–1982, 1985–1986). The manager with the highest winning percentage in his career with the franchise is Luman Harris, owner of a .630 winning percentage during his 27 games managed in 1961; conversely, the worst winning percentage in franchise history is .222 by Oscar Melillo, who posted a 2–7 record during the 1938 season. Eight Orioles managers have been elected to the National Baseball Hall of Fame, including Frank Robinson, who was the first African-American manager in Major League Baseball; and Rogers Hornsby, who was a member of the cross-city rival Cardinals during the franchise's tenure in St. Louis.

== Table key ==
Years	Linked to the corresponding Major League Baseball season
WPct	Winning percentage: number of wins divided by number of games managed
PA	Playoff appearances: number of years this manager has led the franchise to the post-season
PW	Playoff wins: number of wins this manager has accrued in the post-season
PL	Playoff losses: number of losses this manager has accrued in the post-season
Pen	Pennants: number of pennants (league championships) won by the manager
WS	World Series: number of World Series victories achieved by the manager
† or ‡	Elected to the National Baseball Hall of Fame (‡ denotes induction as manager)
§	Number retired by the Baltimore Orioles franchise

== Managers ==
#^{[a]}	Image	Manager	Years	Wins	Losses	WPct	PA	PW	PL	Pen	WS	Ref
1		Hugh Duffy^{†}	1901	48	89	.350	—	—	—	—	—	
2		Jimmy McAleer	1902–1909	551	632	.466	—	—	—	—	—	
3		Jack O'Connor	1910	47	107	.305	—	—	—	—	—	
4		Bobby Wallace^{†}	1911–1912	57	134	.298	—	—	—	—	—	
5		George Stovall	1912–1913	91	158	.365	—	—	—	—	—	
6		Jimmy Austin	1913	2	6	.250	—	—	—	—	—	
7		Branch Rickey^{†}	1913–1915	139	179	.437	—	—	—	—	—	
8		Fielder Jones	1916–1918	158	196	.446	—	—	—	—	—	
—		Jimmy Austin	1918	7	9	.438	—	—	—	—	—	
9		Jimmy Burke	1918–1920	172	180	.489	—	—	—	—	—	
10		Lee Fohl	1921–1923	226	183	.553	—	—	—	—	—	
—		Jimmy Austin	1923	22	29	.431	—	—	—	—	—	
11		George Sisler^{†}	1924–1926	218	241	.475	—	—	—	—	—	
12		Dan Howley	1927–1929	220	239	.479	—	—	—	—	—	
13		Bill Killefer	1930–1933	224	329	.405	—	—	—	—	—	
14		Allen Sothoron	1933	2	6	.250	—	—	—	—	—	
15		Rogers Hornsby^{†}	1933–1937	233	352	.398	—	—	—	—	—	
16		Jim Bottomley^{†}	1937	21	56	.273	—	—	—	—	—	
17		Gabby Street	1938	53	90	.371	—	—	—	—	—	
18		Oscar Melillo	1938	2	7	.222	—	—	—	—	—	
19		Fred Haney	1939–1941	125	227	.355	—	—	—	—	—	
20		Luke Sewell	1941–1946	432	410	.513	1	2	4	1	0	
21		Zack Taylor	1946	13	17	.433	—	—	—	—	—	
22		Muddy Ruel	1947	59	95	.383	—	—	—	—	—	
—		Zack Taylor	1948–1951	222	393	.361	—	—	—	—	—	
—		Rogers Hornsby^{†}	1952	22	29	.431	—	—	—	—	—	
23		Marty Marion	1952–1953	96	161	.374	—	—	—	—	—	
24		Jimmie Dykes	1954	54	100	.351	—	—	—	—	—	
25		Paul Richards	1955–1961	517	539	.490	—	—	—	—	—	
26		Luman Harris	1961	17	10	.630	—	—	—	—	—	
27		Billy Hitchcock	1962–1963	163	161	.503	—	—	—	—	—	
28		Hank Bauer	1964–1968	407	318	.561	1	4	0	1	1	
29		Earl Weaver^{‡§}	1968–1982	1354	919	.596	6	28	18	4	1	
30		Joe Altobelli	1983–1985	212	167	.559	1	7	2	1	1	
31		Cal Ripken, Sr.	1985	1	0	1.000	—	—	—	—	—	
—		Earl Weaver^{‡§}	1985–1986	126	141	.472	—	—	—	—	—	
—		Cal Ripken, Sr.	1987–1988	67	101	.399	—	—	—	—	—	
32		Frank Robinson^{†§}	1988–1991	230	285	.447	—	—	—	—	—	
33		Johnny Oates	1991–1994	291	270	.519	—	—	—	—	—	
34		Phil Regan	1995	71	73	.493	—	—	—	—	—	
35		Davey Johnson	1996–1997	186	138	.574	2	9	10	0	0	
36		Ray Miller	1998–1999	157	167	.485	—	—	—	—	—	
37		Mike Hargrove	2000–2003	275	372	.425	—	—	—	—	—	
38		Lee Mazzilli	2004–2005	129	140	.480	—	—	—	—	—	
39		Sam Perlozzo	2005–2007	122	164	.427	—	—	—	—	—	
40		Dave Trembley	2007–2010	187	283	.398	—	—	—	—	—	
41		Juan Samuel	2010	17	34	.333	—	—	—	—	—	
42		Buck Showalter	2010–2018	669	684	.494	3	6	7	0	0	
43		Brandon Hyde	2019–2025	421	493	.461	2	0	5	0	0	
44		Craig Albernaz	2026– present	79	82	.491	-	-	-	-	-	
Totals		43 Managers	124 Seasons	9,134	10,113	.475	16	56	46	7	3	

== Footnotes ==
- ^{a} A running total of the number of Brewers'/Browns'/Orioles' managers. Thus, any manager who has two or more separate terms is only counted once.
