= David Kaplan (radio) =

American radio and television personality (born 1960)

- Born: November 19, 1960 (age 65); Chicago, Illinois
- Spouse: Mindy Kaplan
- Children: 4
- Presenting career
- Show: Kap and J. Hood
- Station: ESPN 1000
- Time slot: 6:00 AM-9:00 AM CT
- Show: The REKAP on YouTube
- Network: @rekapdavidkaplan
- Time slot: Daily
- Website: www.youtube.com/channel/UC-gCJG2UFyTHESi-zn5EEWw

David Kaplan is an American sports columnist, radio and television personality. He currently co-hosts Kap and J. Hood on ESPN 1000 and manages a YouTube channel, @rekapdavidkaplan, where he posts recaps of Chicago Cubs, Chicago White Sox, and Chicago Bears games, along with coverage of other Chicago and major sporting events.

Kaplan is the only person in Chicago media history to simultaneously host a daily television show, a daily radio show, and write a regular column for a major newspaper.

== Early life and career ==
Kaplan grew up in Skokie, Illinois, and graduated from Hamline University in St. Paul, Minnesota, where he earned a bachelor's degree in English. He has been married twice previously.

== Basketball career ==
Kaplan served as an assistant coach on head coach John McDougal's staff for the Northern Illinois University men's basketball team from 1982 to 1986. He also worked as a scout for two NBA teams, the Indiana Pacers and the Seattle SuperSonics.

== Broadcasting career ==
Kaplan began his broadcasting career at Chicago sports radio station WMVP-AM before joining WGN (AM) as a sports reporter in 1995.

=== WGN Radio and Sports Central ===
In 1995, Kaplan became the host of Sports Central on WGN, which quickly became Chicago radio's top-rated sports talk show. He co-hosted the show with former Chicago Bears star Tom Waddle for over 10 years, making them the longest-running sports talk duo in Chicago radio history. After Waddle left to join ESPN Radio in February 2007, Kaplan hosted the show solo until March 2010. Sports Central, which began in 1982, was Chicago's longest-running sports talk show until it was replaced by a non-sports talk show in March 2010 by then-program director Kevin Metheny, who was portrayed as Kenny "Pig Vomit" Rushton in the Howard Stern film Private Parts. In December 2010, following Metheny’s departure, Kaplan signed a long-term contract to remain at WGN Radio, becoming the primary host of a new evening talk show called WGN Sports Night.

=== Comcast SportsNet and Chicago Tribune Live ===
In January 2008, Kaplan was named the host of Chicago Tribune Live on Comcast SportsNet (CSN). In November 2009, he and the Chicago Tribune Live team were awarded an Emmy Award for Best Interview Program. In 2013, the show was rebranded as Sports Talk Live, which Kaplan hosted until its cancellation in August 2020 due to the COVID-19 pandemic.

=== Additional television appearances ===
Kaplan appeared as a guest on The Oprah Winfrey Show and featured in the acclaimed documentary Hoop Dreams during his basketball scouting career. In 2011, he appeared in the ESPN documentary Catching Hell, which chronicled the story of the 2003 Chicago Cubs and fan Steve Bartman’s controversial role in Game 6 of the National League Championship Series.

=== College basketball and NBC Sports Network ===
In November 2012, Kaplan was hired by NBC Sports Network to call college basketball games, after previously working as a basketball announcer for ESPN. He also calls college basketball games for various conferences, including the Atlantic 10 Conference on NBCSN, the Missouri Valley Conference, and the Horizon League. Kaplan has also served as an announcer for the Chicago Machine and the Chicago Shamrox.

=== Kap and Haugh and move to ESPN ===
From 2013 to 2015, Kaplan co-hosted Kap and Haugh on Comcast SportsNet Chicago, alongside longtime Chicago Tribune lead sports columnist David Haugh. After a 21-year career at WGN Radio, Kaplan signed a multi-year contract with ESPN in 2015, where he began hosting Kap and Co., a daily sports radio show on ESPN 1000 in Chicago, airing from 9:00 AM to noon CT. Kaplan’s co-hosts included U.S. Hockey Hall of Famer Eddie Olczyk, who also serves as a color analyst for the Chicago Blackhawks and the NHL on NBC, and Jordan Cornette, who later moved to Bristol, Connecticut, to work for ESPN and the ACC Network. Cornette’s wife, Shae Peppler Cornette, also co-hosted with Kaplan, along with NBC Sports Chicago broadcaster Pat Boyle. Currently, Kaplan co-hosts Kap and J. Hood with Jonathan Hood on ESPN 1000 from 6:00 to 9:00 AM CT.

=== Cubs Pre- and Postgame coverage ===
Kaplan hosted pregame and postgame shows for the Chicago Cubs on either WGN Radio or television for 25 seasons from 1995 to 2019. He was the former pregame and postgame host for NBC Sports Chicago’s Chicago Cubs broadcasts, partnering with former Cubs outfielders Todd Hollandsworth, David DeJesus, and Doug Glanville.

=== Unfiltered with David Kaplan ===
On March 28, 2022, NBC Sports Chicago announced that Kaplan would host a new 30-minute weeknight sports talk show titled Unfiltered with David Kaplan, which premiered on April 4, 2022. In November 2022, Kaplan announced that he would leave NBC Sports Chicago at the end of the year to focus on his ESPN radio show and his growing YouTube channel.

== Awards ==
Kaplan was inducted into the Chicagoland Sports Hall of Fame in 2021. He has won three Emmy Awards for his television work, including two at Comcast SportsNet and one for hosting A Piece of the Game, a nationally aired sports memorabilia show that has received multiple awards for excellence.

From 2009 to 2011, Kaplan co-authored the award-winning Around Town column in the Chicago Tribune with longtime writer Fred Mitchell. He was inducted into the WGN Radio Walk of Fame in May 2018 and was also inducted into both the Illinois Basketball Coaches Association (IBCA) Hall of Fame and the Chicago Public League Basketball Coaches Hall of Fame in 2017.
