= Buck Showalter =

American baseball manager (born 1956)

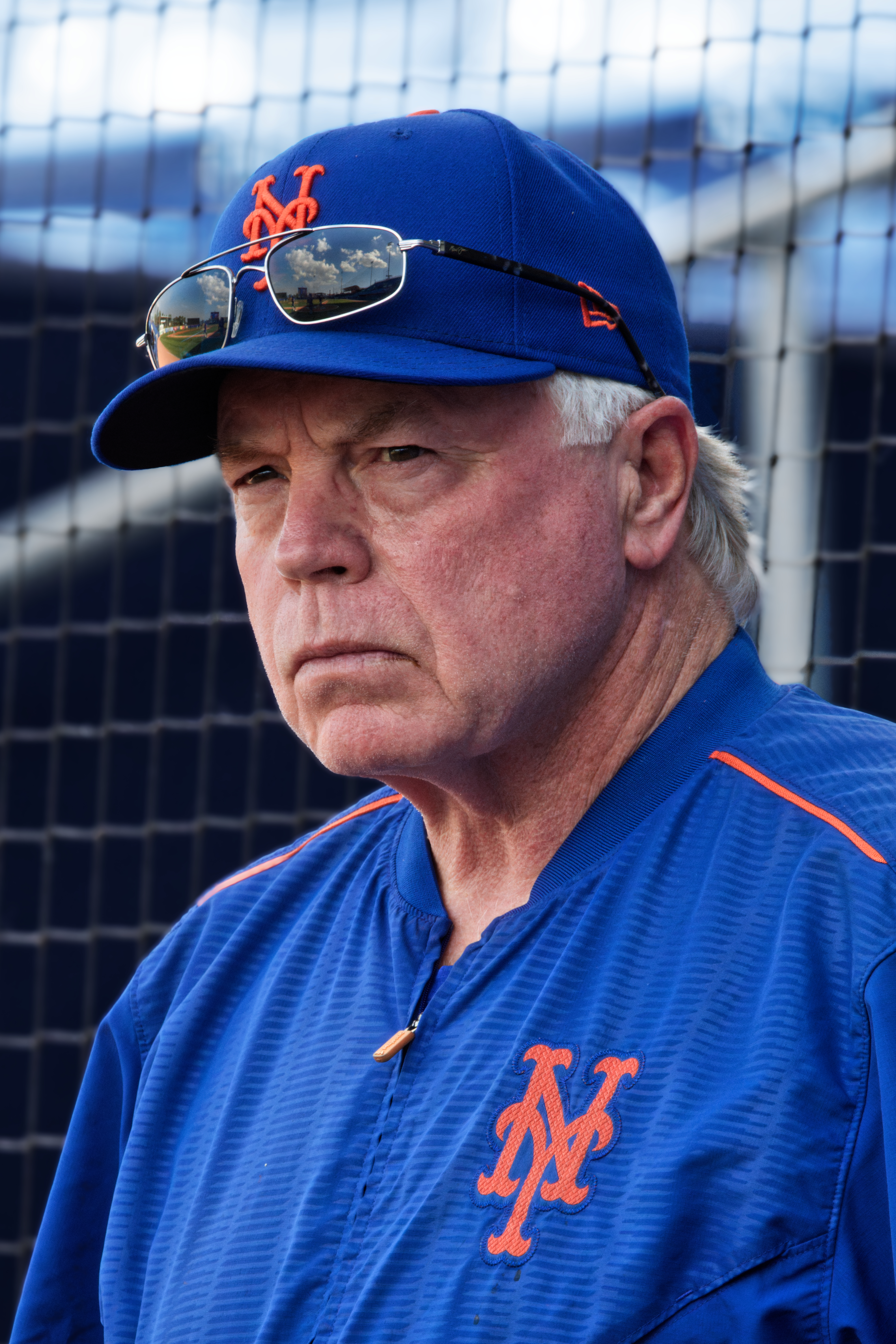
- Showalter with the New York Mets in 2023
- Manager
- Born: May 23, 1956 (age 70); DeFuniak Springs, Florida, U.S.
- Batted: Left Threw: Left

MLB statistics
- Managerial record: 1,727–1,664
- Winning %: .509
- Stats at Baseball Reference
- Managerial record at Baseball Reference

Teams
- As manager: New York Yankees (1992–1995); Arizona Diamondbacks (1998–2000); Texas Rangers (2003–2006); Baltimore Orioles (2010–2018); New York Mets (2022–2023); As coach: New York Yankees (1990–1991)

Career highlights and awards
- 4× Manager of the Year (1994, 2004, 2014, 2022)

William Nathaniel "Buck" Showalter III (born May 23, 1956) is an American professional baseball manager. He served as manager of the New York Yankees (1992–1995), Arizona Diamondbacks (1998–2000), Texas Rangers (2003–2006), Baltimore Orioles (2010–2018) and New York Mets (2022–2023). He also is a former professional Minor League Baseball player and television analyst for ESPN and the YES Network.

Showalter has earned a reputation for building baseball teams into postseason contenders in short periods of time. He helped the Yankees rise from the bottom half of the AL East to first place before a players' strike prematurely ended the 1994 campaign. Under his watch, the Diamondbacks made their first-ever playoff appearance in only the second year of the team's existence. Despite this reputation, Showalter has never appeared in a World Series; coincidentally, he left both the Yankees and Diamondbacks just prior to seasons when they won the World Series. Since Dusty Baker's win in the 2022 World Series, Showalter has become the winningest active manager in MLB never to win a World Series. In 22 seasons, he has reached the postseason six times, reaching the League Championship Series once.

A three-time American League (AL) and one-time National League (NL) Manager of the Year, he is the third manager to win four Manager of the Year awards, the seventh to win the award in both the American and National Leagues, and the only one to win the award with four different teams and in four different decades.

== Early life ==
Showalter was born in DeFuniak Springs, Florida, on May 23, 1956, and grew up in nearby Century. His father, William Nathaniel Showalter II, served 23 years as a teacher and principal at Century High School, from which the younger Showalter graduated. Before becoming a teacher, his father had been a Little All-American fullback in 1940 at Milligan College, and had considered a career in the National Football League with the Pittsburgh Steelers, but chose to become a high school coach instead.

== College career ==
Showalter was known as "Nat", and had not acquired the nickname "Buck" prior to turning professional. Showalter played college baseball at Chipola Junior College (now Chipola College) in Marianna, Florida, in 1976. From there he transferred to Mississippi State University to play for the Mississippi State Bulldogs.

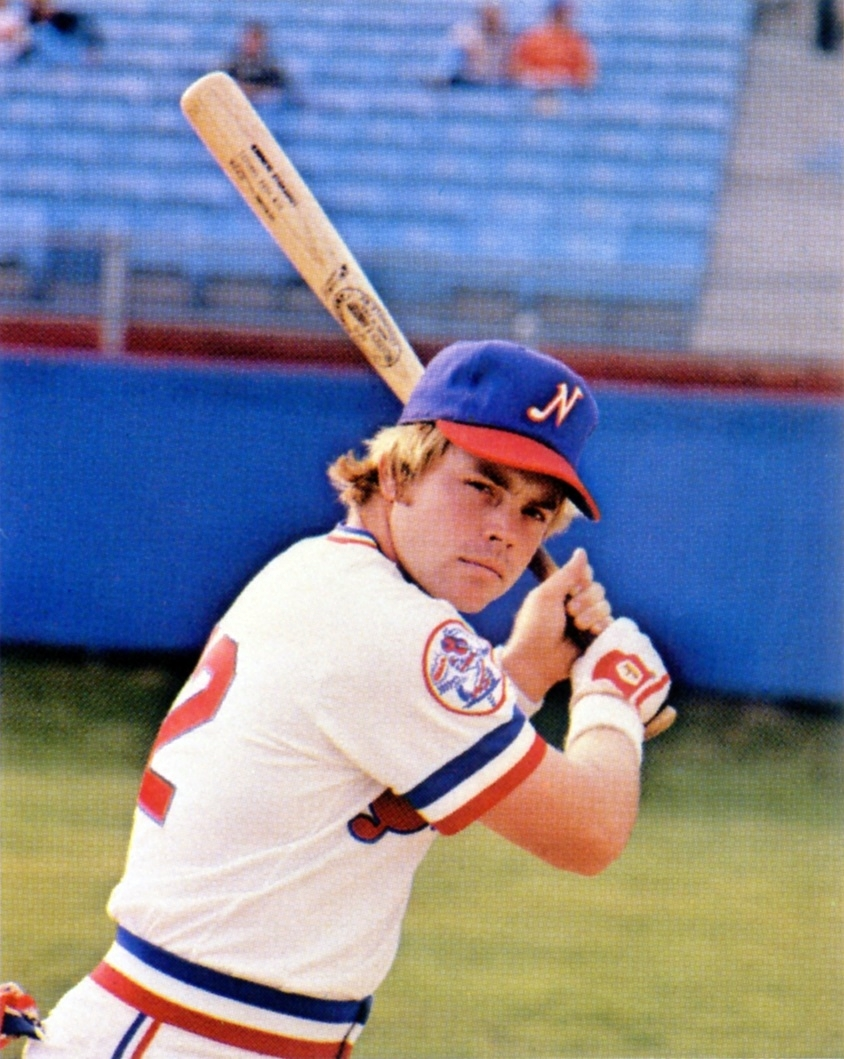
Showalter with the Nashville Sounds in 1980

In 1976, Showalter played collegiate summer baseball in the Cape Cod Baseball League (CCBL) for the Hyannis Mets, where he won the league batting title with a .434 batting average, and was named league MVP. In 2002, he was inducted into the CCBL Hall of Fame.

Showalter was an All-American and set the Mississippi State record for batting average in a season by hitting .459 during the 1977 season.

== Playing career ==
He was selected by the New York Yankees in the fifth round of the 1977 MLB draft, and spent seven seasons in the Yankees' minor league system where he had a career average of .294 with 17 home runs and 336 runs batted in. He never played in the major leagues, rising no higher than Triple-A Columbus (one rung below the majors).

== Coaching and managerial career ==
=== Minor leagues ===
Showalter was hired as manager of the Single-A minor-league Oneonta Yankees of the New York–Penn League in 1985, leading them to 114 victories in two seasons. In August 2017, he was named as an inductee in the New York–Penn League Hall of Fame.

In 1987, Showalter became manager of the minor league Fort Lauderdale Yankees, leading the league with an 85–53 record in his first season. In 1989, Showalter managed the Double-A Albany-Colonie Yankees of the Eastern League, where he was named Minor League Manager of the Year by Baseball America.

=== New York Yankees (1990–1995) ===
In 1990, Showalter was promoted to the coaching staff of the New York Yankees, and eventually succeeded Stump Merrill as the team's manager for the 1992 season. During his four years as the Yankees' manager, the team posted a record of 313–268, finishing first during the strike-shortened 1994 season, thereby being named by the Associated Press as the American League Manager of the Year and became the 1995 American League manager for the All-Star Game. The Yankees won the AL wild card in 1995, participating in the playoffs for the first time since 1981. However, they lost to the Seattle Mariners in the Division Series. Following the season, owner George Steinbrenner offered Showalter a new, two-year contract, but demanded that Showalter fire his hitting coach, Rick Down. Showalter was unwilling to do this. On October 26, 1995, the Yankees announced that Showalter and the team had parted ways "'under amicable terms'"; Showalter expressed surprise at the announcement. While some sources say that Showalter was fired from the Yankees, others indicate that he resigned his position. Showalter finished his Yankees tenure with a regular-season record of 313 wins and 268 losses and a playoff record of two wins and three losses.

Showalter was not re-hired after that season in part because of the playoff loss, but mostly because he stood up for his players during the strike. The Yankees won the World Series the following year and they would win the World Series in four of the next five years. However, Showalter could not watch the Yankees win the World Series, saying, "I feel badly for the fans" in New York for what they lost during the 1994 strike.

Showalter appeared as himself along with Danny Tartabull in the September 1994 Seinfeld television episode "The Chaperone".

=== Arizona Diamondbacks (1998–2000) ===
In November 1995, Showalter was approached to manage the Arizona Diamondbacks, an expansion team that would begin play in 1998. Showalter was interested in taking a more active role in developing the eventual roster, complete with a $7 million contract for seven years. He had a handshake deal with the team, but Yankees owner George Steinbrenner made one last ditch effort to his home in Florida about wanting him back (Joe Torre had been tapped to manage for the moment). Showalter elected to honor his agreement with Arizona. In the Diamondbacks' first season (1998), Showalter managed the team to a 65–97 record, but following numerous off-season player acquisitions, which included Randy Johnson, Armando Reynoso, Todd Stottlemyre, Luis Gonzalez, Tony Womack, and Steve Finley, Showalter managed the 1999 team to a 100–62 record and the National League West title, making them the fastest expansion team in MLB history to win a division title. They lost in the NLDS to the New York Mets. After the team regressed to an 85–77 record in 2000, the Diamondbacks fired Showalter on October 1, 2000, with the team citing a need for a "lighter touch" as compared to the disciplinarian approach by Showalter. He had a three-year record of 250–236. Just as the Yankees did after replacing him, the Diamondbacks, managed by Bob Brenly, won the World Series the following year.

=== Texas Rangers (2003–2006) ===
After a few years as an analyst on ESPN, Showalter was hired as manager of the Texas Rangers on October 11, 2002, following a last-place season under manager Jerry Narron. In his first season with the Rangers, Showalter managed the team to a 71–91 record—again in last place; but following the high-profile, off-season trade which sent Alex Rodriguez to the Yankees, Showalter's Rangers jumped out to an early-season record of 17–9 by early May of the 2004 season. The Rangers stayed in playoff contention for most of the season, performing far better than most had predicted. The Rangers failed to make the playoffs, finishing third in the AL West, though Showalter was again named Manager of the Year. In Showalter's four years with the Rangers the team failed to finish better than third (of four teams) in the AL West. He was fired as manager on October 4, 2006. He finished his Rangers career with a 319–329 record.

=== Baltimore Orioles (2010–2018) ===
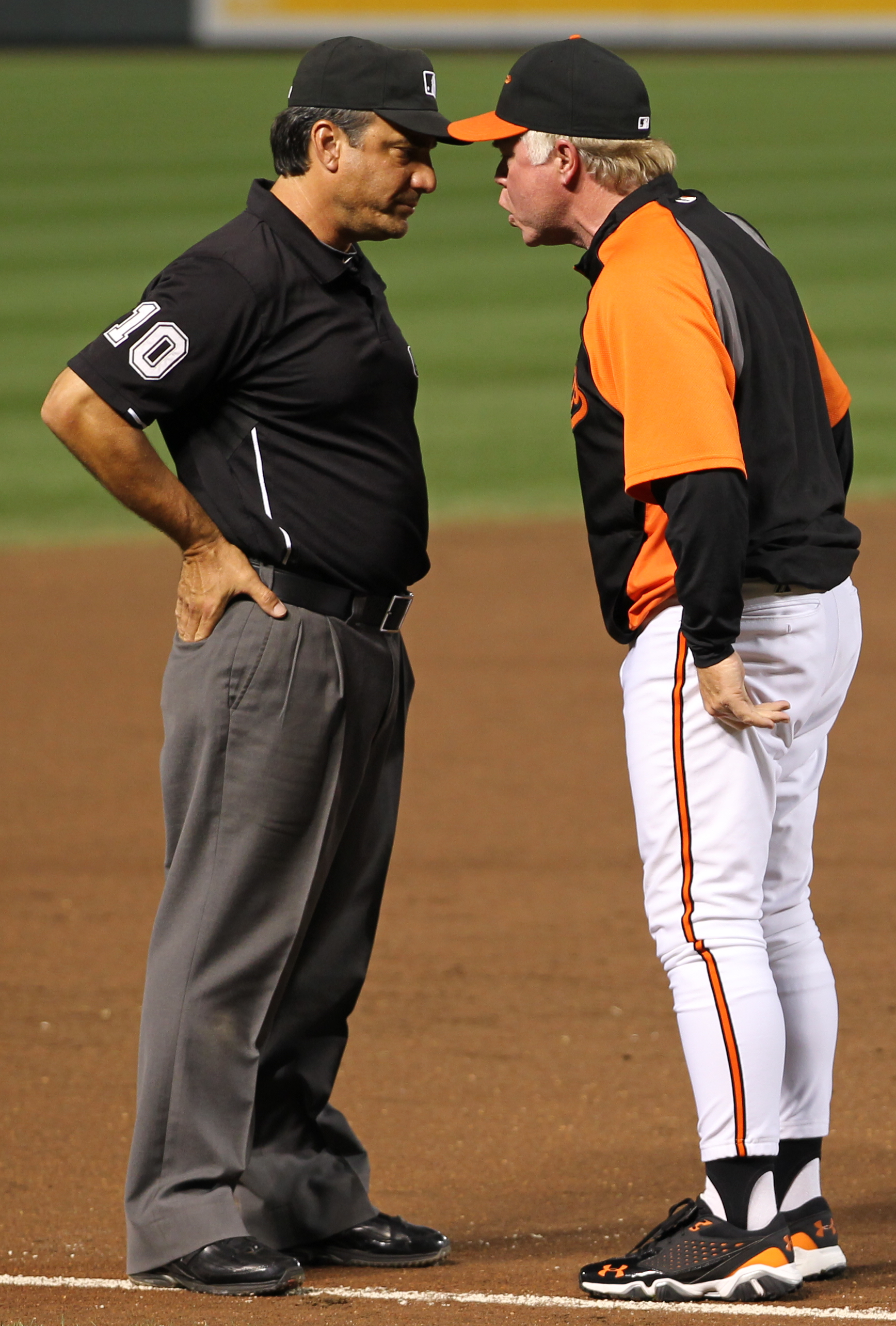
Showalter arguing with umpire Phil Cuzzi in 2011

Showalter was hired as a senior advisor to baseball operations for the Cleveland Indians on December 1, 2006, and then returned to ESPN as an analyst, before being appointed to succeed Juan Samuel as manager of the Baltimore Orioles on July 29, 2010. He chose to wear uniform number 26 as a tribute to Johnny Oates. Signed to a contract through the 2013 campaign, he inherited a ballclub with the worst record in the majors at 32–73. In his debut as manager on August 3, the Orioles recorded a 6–3 win over the Los Angeles Angels of Anaheim at Oriole Park, leading to a three-game sweep. The team's first-ever season series sweep of the Angels was completed by the end of the month. The 2010 Orioles won 34 of 57 games played under Showalter, second only to the Phillies during the same stretch.

Showalter managed the 1,000th victory of his major-league career in a 7–1 triumph at Yankee Stadium on May 1, 2012. Showalter finished the 2012 season with a record of 93-69 (.574), ending a 14-year streak of losing seasons for the Orioles going back to 1998.

Under Showalter, the Orioles reached the postseason for the first time since 1997, defeating the Texas Rangers in the Wild Card game on October 5, 2012. The Orioles were later defeated by the New York Yankees in the 2012 American League Division Series, 3 games to 2. Showalter was named the AL Manager of the Year by The Sporting News. He was re-signed through 2018 with the Orioles.

After finishing out of playoff contention in the 2013 season, Showalter led the 2014 Orioles to the AL East title—the franchise's first in 17 years. The Orioles subsequently swept the Detroit Tigers (3–0) in the ALDS for Showalter's first major league ALDS title, before being swept themselves (4–0) by the Kansas City Royals in the ALCS.

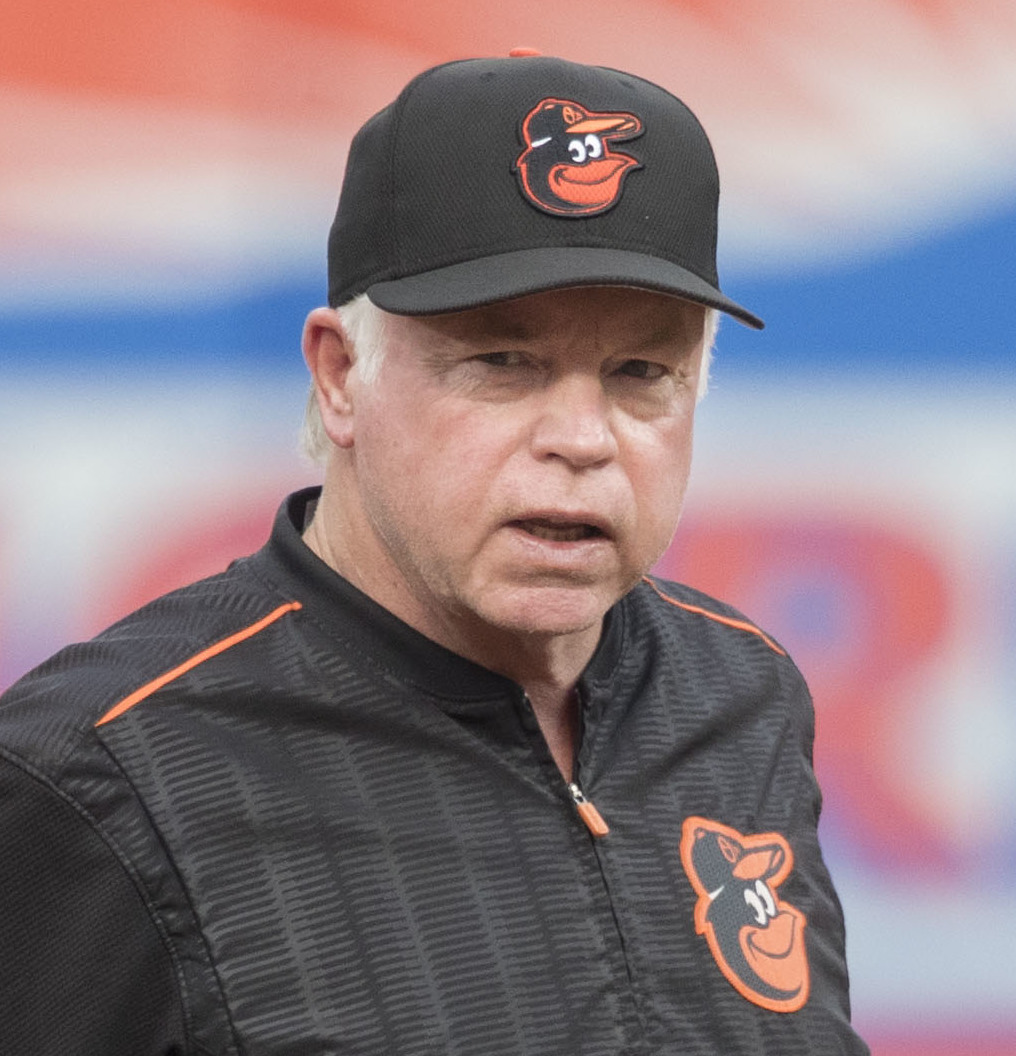
Showalter with the Baltimore Orioles in 2017

On November 11, 2014, Showalter won his third AL Manager of the Year award, his first since 2004.

The Orioles finished the 2015 season with an 81–81 record, giving them their fourth consecutive non-losing season. In 2016, the Orioles finished tied for second in the American League East with an 89–73 record. They made the postseason for the third time in five years, but lost 5–2 in 11 innings to the Toronto Blue Jays during the AL Wild Card game.

On October 3, 2018, days after the Orioles finished with a franchise-worst 115 losses, Showalter's and general manager Dan Duquette's contracts ran out and the team announced that they would not be brought back.

=== New York Mets (2022–2023) ===
On December 18, 2021, the New York Mets hired Showalter as their manager, signing him to a three-year contract. Showalter wore number 11, the number he wore every other place he managed except Baltimore, where he wore number 26 as a tribute to Johnny Oates.

In 2022, he tied for the lead among all major league managers in overturns (26), and had the highest overturn percentage (78.6%), while he was the only full-season manager not to be ejected from any games. Under Showalter, the Mets had their first 100-win season since 1988, but their division lead (one that reached 10 games at one point) was gradually whittled away by September, with a three-game-sweep by the Atlanta Braves proving key to the finish as the Mets lost the division title to the Braves in an automatic tiebreaker. The Mets would go on to lose the NL Wild Card Series in Game 3 to the San Diego Padres. After the season on November 14, Showalter was named NL Manager of the Year.

Amid a disappointing start to the 2023 season, in the words of The Athletic's Tim Britton, Showalter's performance came "under justified fire" from fans. In spite of that, on June 28, 2023, Mets majority owner Steve Cohen held a press conference in which he affirmed that Showalter's job would be guaranteed at least until the end of what Cohen conceded was an "incredibly frustrating" season. On October 1, during the final day of the season, Showalter announced that he was fired as Mets manager by newly appointed President of Baseball Operations David Stearns.

== Managerial record ==
As of August 21, 2023

Team	Year	Regular season					Postseason			
Team	Year	Games	Won	Lost	Win %	Finish	Won	Lost	Win %	Result
NYY	1992	162	76	86	.469	4th in AL East	–	–	–	–
NYY	1993	162	88	74	.543	2nd in AL East	–	–	–	–
NYY	1994	113	70	43	.619	1st in AL East	–	–	–	N/A (strike)
NYY	1995	145	79	65	.549	2nd in AL East	2	3	.400	Lost ALDS (SEA)
NYY Total		582	313	268	.539		2	3	.400	
ARI	1998	162	65	97	.401	5th in NL West	–	–	–	–
ARI	1999	162	100	62	.617	1st in NL West	1	3	.250	Lost NLDS (NYM)
ARI	2000	162	85	77	.525	3rd in NL West	–	–	–	–
ARI Total		486	250	236	.514		1	3	.250	
TEX	2003	162	71	91	.438	4th in AL West	–	–	–	–
TEX	2004	162	89	73	.549	3rd in AL West	–	–	–	–
TEX	2005	162	79	83	.488	3rd in AL West	–	–	–	–
TEX	2006	162	80	82	.494	3rd in AL West	–	–	–	–
TEX Total		648	319	329	.492		0	0	–	
BAL	2010	57	34	23	.596	5th in AL East	–	–	–	–
BAL	2011	162	69	93	.426	5th in AL East	–	–	–	–
BAL	2012	162	93	69	.574	2nd in AL East	3	3	.500	Lost ALDS (NYY)
BAL	2013	162	85	77	.525	3rd in AL East	–	–	–	–
BAL	2014	162	96	66	.593	1st in AL East	3	4	.429	Lost ALCS (KC)
BAL	2015	162	81	81	.500	3rd in AL East	–	–	–	–
BAL	2016	162	89	73	.549	2nd in AL East	0	1	.000	Lost ALWC (TOR)
BAL	2017	162	75	87	.463	5th in AL East	–	–	–	–
BAL	2018	162	47	115	.290	5th in AL East	–	–	–	–
BAL Total		1,353	669	684	.494		6	8	.429	
NYM	2022	162	101	61	.623	2nd in NL East	1	2	.333	Lost NLWCS (SD)
NYM	2023	162	75	87	.463	4th in NL East	–	–	–	–
NYM Total		324	176	148	.543		–	–	–	
Total		3,393	1,727	1,665	.509		11	16	.407	

== Personal life ==
Showalter has been married to his wife, Angela, since 1983. They have two children, Allie, born in 1987, and William, born in 1991. The couple met in Nashville when he was playing for the Nashville Sounds. When Showalter was manager of the Orioles, his wife was active in the KidsPeace charity for foster children.

== See also ==
- List of Major League Baseball managers with most career wins

Preceded by Bill Livesey	Oneonta Yankees Manager; 1985–1986	Succeeded by Gary Allenson
Preceded by Bucky Dent	Fort Lauderdale Yankees Manager; 1987–1988	Succeeded by Clete Boyer
Preceded by Stump Merrill	Albany-Colonie Yankees Manager; 1989	Succeeded by Rick Down
Preceded by Joe Sparks	New York Yankees Third Base Coach; 1990–1991	Succeeded by Clete Boyer
