= Todd Hollandsworth =

American baseball player (born 1973)

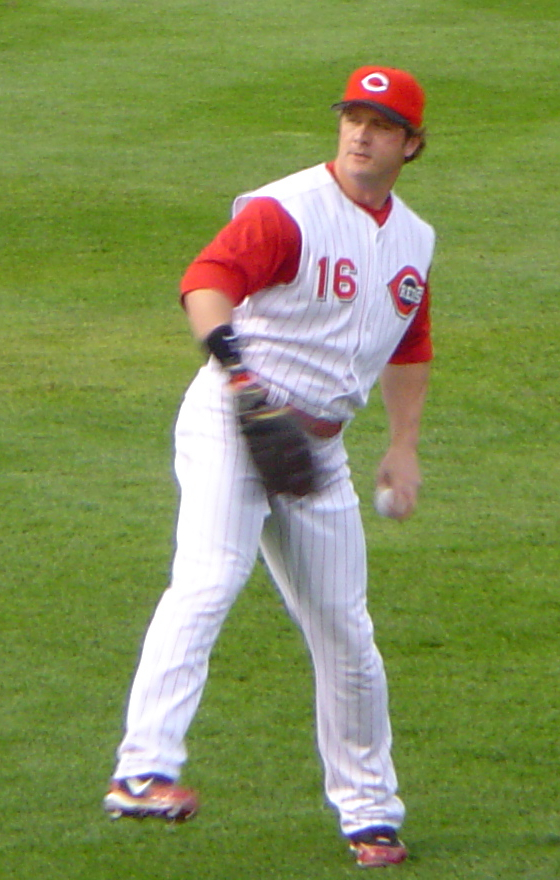
- Hollandsworth with the Cincinnati Reds in 2006
- Outfielder
- Born: April 20, 1973 (age 53); Dayton, Ohio, U.S.
- Batted: Left Threw: Left

MLB debut
- April 25, 1995, for the Los Angeles Dodgers

Last MLB appearance
- September 30, 2006, for the Cincinnati Reds

MLB statistics
- Batting average: .273
- Home runs: 98
- Runs batted in: 401
- Stats at Baseball Reference

Teams
- Los Angeles Dodgers (1995–2000); Colorado Rockies (2000–2002); Texas Rangers (2002); Florida Marlins (2003); Chicago Cubs (2004–2005); Atlanta Braves (2005); Cleveland Indians (2006); Cincinnati Reds (2006)

Career highlights and awards
- World Series champion (2003); NL Rookie of the Year (1996)

Todd Mathew Hollandsworth (born April 20, 1973) is an American former professional baseball outfielder in Major League Baseball (MLB). He played for eight teams in twelve seasons from 1995 to 2006. With his rookie status intact to start the 1996 season, he batted .291 while leading the league in select categories for rookies on his way to winning the National League Rookie of the Year Award for the Los Angeles Dodgers; he was the fifth of five straight Dodgers to win the award from 1992 to 1996 (preceded by Eric Karros, Mike Piazza, Raúl Mondesí, and Hideo Nomo). Injuries plagued his career, as he played in 100 games just five times in twelve seasons for eight different teams. As a utility player in 2003, he was a member of the Florida Marlins when they won the World Series to give Hollandsworth his first and only world championship.

== Early years ==
Hollandsworth was born in Dayton, Ohio, and graduated from Newport High School in Bellevue, Washington, in 1991. He was drafted in the third round of the 1991 Major League Baseball draft by the Los Angeles Dodgers out of high school.

Over four seasons in the Dodgers' farm system, Hollandsworth displayed decent power. He batted .262 with 57 home runs and 245 runs batted in, including a 1994 season with the Pacific Coast League's Albuquerque Dukes in which he clubbed nineteen home runs with 91 RBIs.

== Los Angeles Dodgers ==
A lack of outfield depth earned Hollandsworth a spot on the 1995 Dodgers opening day roster. He made just six appearances as a late inning defensive replacement for Billy Ashley in left field before breaking a bone in his right wrist. After a brief stint in Albuquerque, he returned to the Dodgers, and went 3-for-4 with two RBIs and two runs scored against the Florida Marlins in his first start on July 14. He also turned in a fine defensive play to preserve the no-hitter Dodgers pitcher Ramón Martínez hurled. On July 18, he hit his first career home run against the Houston Astros' Shane Reynolds. A few innings later, Reynolds served up his second career home run. All told, Hollandsworth batted .233 with five home runs and thirteen RBIs in 1995. He made 115 plate appearances with 103 official at bats, allowing him to go into the 1996 season with his rookie status still intact. He went hitless in the 1995 National League Division Series with the Cincinnati Reds.

Hollandsworth got off to a slow start in 1996. An 0-for-3 performance against the rival San Francisco Giants on April 16 punctuated a 1-for-25 slump that saw his batting average drop to a season low .111. From there, Hollandsworth went on a tear. He went twelve for his next 25 to raise his batting average to .288. He hit his first home run of the season on May 11, and like his first home run the previous season, a second home run followed in the same game. For the season, he led all NL rookies in hits (139), doubles (26), home runs (tied with Jermaine Dye, 12), RBIs (59) and stolen bases (21) on his way to winning NL Rookie of the Year honors. While the Dodgers were swept in three games by the Atlanta Braves in the 1996 National League Division Series, Hollandsworth had an excellent series. He went 4-for-12 with three doubles.

Hollandsworth suffered a sophomore slump in 1997. He was batting .232 with two home runs and eighteen RBIs when demoted to triple A on June 13. He returned at the end of the month, and batted .323 through the month of July before breaking a bone near his right elbow. He returned in September, but saw very limited use. He went 4-for-24 over the remainder of the season to end the season at .247 with four home runs and 34 RBIs. Injuries also derailed his 1998 season. He injured his leg twice during Spring training, and suffered a season ending injury in late May.

During the off-season, the Dodgers signed free agent center fielder Devon White, prompting Hollandsworth to request a trade. His request went ungranted, and despite his undefined, limited role in 1999, Hollandsworth put up his best numbers since his rookie season. Finding his way into the line-up in all three outfield positions, first base and designated hitter during interleague play, Hollandsworth batted .284 with nine home runs and 32 RBIs, all career highs since his rookie season.

== Colorado Rockies ==
He began the 2000 season platooning with White in center and batting lead-off. With a tight three team race going on in the National League West, Dodgers brass felt they needed to acquire more of a true lead off batter at the trade deadline. On July 31, Hollandsworth and two minor leaguers were shipped to the Colorado Rockies for former Dodger prospect center fielder Tom Goodwin.

After a less-than stellar first month with his new club (.234 avg., 1 HR, 5 RBI), Hollandsworth turned it on in September. He batted .379 with ten home runs and eighteen RBIs. His nineteen combined home runs a new career high. Meanwhile, the Rockies, who were 50–54 at the time of Hollandsworth's acquisition, improved to 32-26 following the trade.

This production prompted the Rockies to re-sign the free agent after the season. Originally expected to play left field and occasionally spell a day off for Juan Pierre in center, Hollandsworth suffered a season ending injury in early May when he fouled a ball off his shin. He was having a career year up until that point, batting .368 with six home runs and nineteen RBIs in 33 games.

He returned healthy in 2002, and after a slow start, batted .326 with six home runs and twenty RBIs in May. Though he still batted over .300 in both June and July, his power numbers dipped, and he was once again on the move at the trade deadline. He and Dennys Reyes, who was also a teammate with the Dodgers, were traded to the Texas Rangers for Gabe Kapler and Jason Romano though neither team was in contention. Almost immediately after joining his new club, Hollandsworth strained his left quadriceps, and went on the fifteen day disabled list. In 39 games for the Rangers, Hollandsworth batted .258 with five home runs and nineteen RBIs. His 67 combined RBIs between his two clubs were a career high.

== Florida Marlins ==
Following his brief stint in the American League, Hollandsworth signed a one-year deal with the Florida Marlins. The Marlins got off to a slow start, and 38 games into the season, fired manager Jeff Torborg, and replaced him with Jack McKeon. For his part, Hollandsworth batted .280 with two home runs and six RBIs for Torborg. Under McKeon, his role diminished. He lost playing time when twenty year old Miguel Cabrera was called up in June. It diminished even further when the Marlins, who were now in a playoff run, acquired original Marlin and fan favorite Jeff Conine at the August 31 post season trade deadline.

Regardless, the formula worked. The Marlins went 75–49 with McKeon at the helm, and captured the NL Wild Card by four games over the Houston Astros. After defeating the San Francisco Giants in the 2003 National League Division Series, the Marlins faced the Chicago Cubs in the 2003 National League Championship Series. Hollandsworth made three pinch hitting appearances, collecting a hit in all three at bats, driving in a run and scoring two.

== Chicago Cubs ==
This performance must have impressed the Cubs, as following the Marlins' triumph over the New York Yankees in the 2003 World Series, Hollandsworth signed with the Cubs as a fourth outfielder and left-handed bat off the bench. He thrived in that role, going 9-for-17 with two home runs as a pinch hitter, but injuries once again derailed his season. He was batting .318 with eight home runs and 22 RBIs when he injured himself mid-at bat against the crosstown rival Chicago White Sox on June 27, 2004, ending his season.

Hollandsworth returned healthy in 2005, and with Moises Alou and Sammy Sosa both departed, had a starting job in left field. He was batting .254 with five home runs and 54 RBIs when he was acquired by the playoff bound Atlanta Braves on August 29, 2005, for minor league pitchers Todd Blackford and Angelo Burrows.

== Retirement ==
Hollandsworth went just 6-for-35 for a .171 batting average in his brief stint in Atlanta, and made no appearances in the post season. Following the season, he signed a minor league deal with the Cleveland Indians with a nonroster invitation to Spring training 2006. He made the club as a back-up corner outfielder behind Jason Michaels and Casey Blake, and batted .237 with six home runs and 27 RBIs. On August 9, he cleared waivers, and was purchased by the contending Cincinnati Reds. He retired after finishing out the season with the Reds.

== Career statistics ==
Games	PA	AB	Runs	Hits	2B	3B	HR	RBI	SB	BB	HBP	SO	Avg.	OBP	Slg.	Fld%
1118	3492	3191	451	871	192	22	98	401	75	262	9	701	.273	.328	.439	.980

== Broadcasting career ==
During the 2008 baseball season, Hollandsworth was a regular contributor to Comcast Sports Net Chicago commenting on the Chicago Cubs baseball season. In 2009, he was named the pre-and-post-game analyst for CSN Chicago's Cubs telecasts alongside David Kaplan, a gig he would hold until the end of the 2016 season.

On December 22, 2016, it was announced that Hollandsworth would be the color analyst for Miami Marlins games on Fox Sports Florida starting in 2017, pairing up with play-by-play announcer Rich Waltz. After one season with Waltz, Hollandsworth teamed up with Paul Severino as Marlins announcers for Bally Sports Florida. After the 2021 season, Hollandsworth was replaced by Tommy Hutton as the Marlins television analyst.

== Personal life ==
Hollandsworth is married to Marci Herges, the sister of his former teammate, pitcher Matt Herges. The two were introduced to one another through Herges while both were with the Dodgers in 2000. They have four children.

Preceded by Chipper Jones	Players Choice NL Most Outstanding Rookie; 1996	Succeeded by Scott Rolen
