= Ben Kozlowski =

American baseball player (born 1980)

- Pitcher
- Born: August 16, 1980 (age 45); St. Petersburg, Florida, U.S.
- Batted: Left Threw: Left

Professional debut
- MLB: September 19, 2002, for the Texas Rangers
- NPB: March 28, 2008, for the Hiroshima Toyo Carp

Last appearance
- MLB: September 28, 2002, for the Texas Rangers
- NPB: April 30, 2009, for the Hiroshima Toyo Carp

MLB statistics
- Win–loss record: 0–0
- Earned run average: 6.30
- Strikeouts: 6

NPB statistics
- Win–loss record: 2–1
- Earned run average: 5.17
- Strikeouts: 31
- Stats at Baseball Reference

Teams
- Texas Rangers (2002); Hiroshima Toyo Carp (2008–2009)

Benjamin Anthony Kozlowski (born August 16, 1980) is an American former professional baseball left-handed pitcher. He previously played in Major League Baseball for the Texas Rangers and in Nippon Professional Baseball for the Hiroshima Toyo Carp.

Drafted by the Atlanta Braves in the 12th round of the 1999 MLB amateur draft, Kozlowski made his Major League Baseball debut with the Texas Rangers on September 19, 2002. He struck out John Olerud looking for his first Major League strikeout.

His 2003 season was cut short when he suffered a torn elbow ligament, necessitating Tommy John surgery.

Kozlowski returned to action in the middle of the 2004 season, but struggled, and was placed on waivers by the Rangers after the season.

Kozlowski was claimed off of waivers by the Cincinnati Reds.

He was traded from the Reds to the Los Angeles Dodgers for outfielder Cody Ross in May 2006.
