= Nick Regilio =

American baseball player (born 1978)

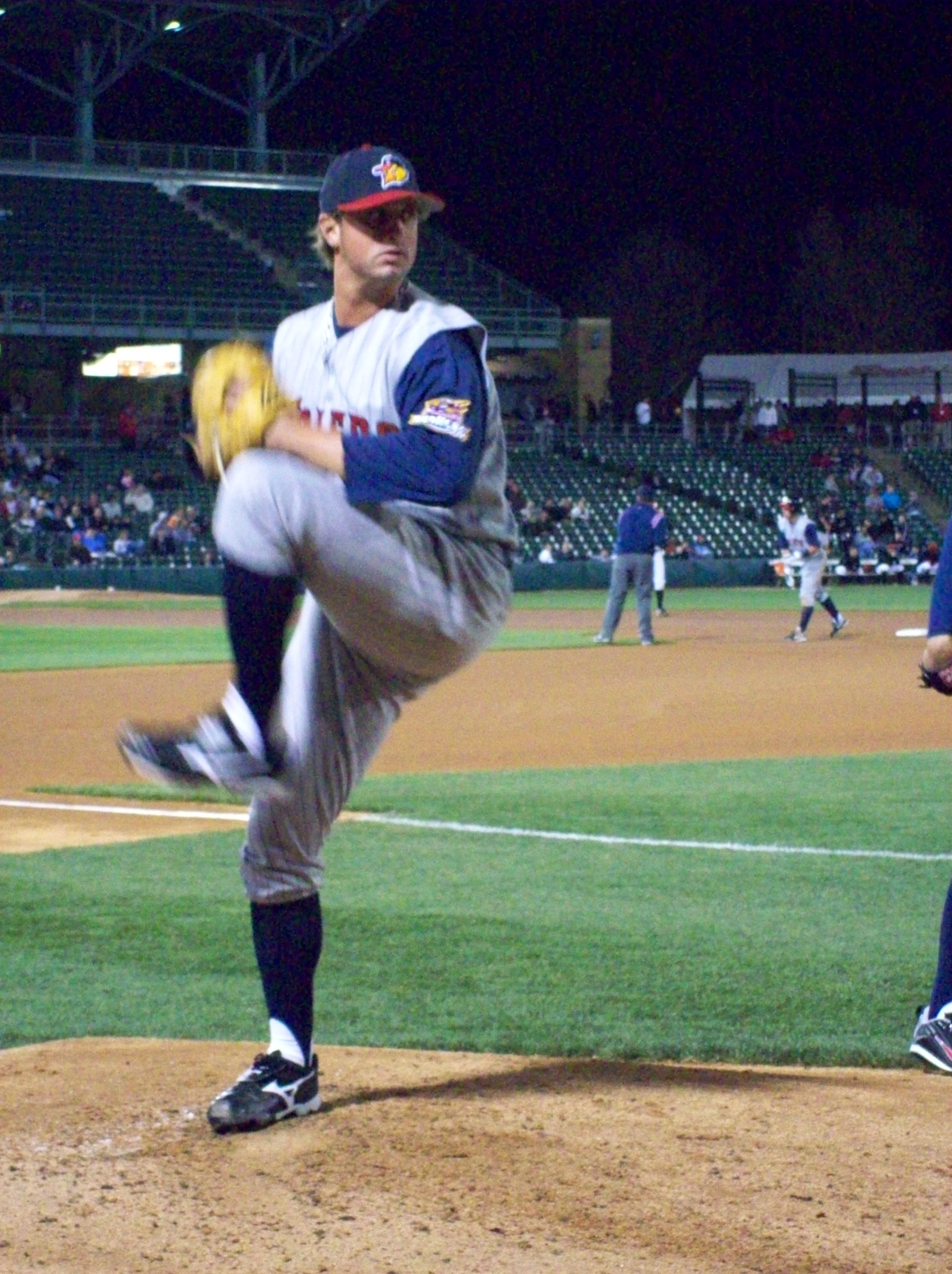
- Relief pitcher
- Born: September 4, 1978 (age 47); Miami, Florida
- Batted: Right Threw: Right

MLB debut
- July 9, 2004, for the Texas Rangers

Last MLB appearance
- June 8, 2005, for the Texas Rangers

MLB statistics
- Win–loss record: 1–6
- Earned run average: 5.35
- Strikeouts: 26
- Stats at Baseball Reference

Teams
- Texas Rangers (2004–2005)

Nicholas D. Regilio (born September 4, 1978) is an American former professional baseball pitcher. He played in Major League Baseball (MLB) for the Texas Rangers.

== Career ==
Regilio was selected by the Texas Rangers in the 2nd round of the 1999 Major League Baseball draft after attending Jacksonville University for two years. Prior to JU he played at Embry–Riddle Aeronautical University for a year. Regilio spent six years in the minors before the Rangers called him up in 2004. Regilio appeared in 24 games including four starts for the Rangers over the next two years. He became a free agent after the 2005 season.

Before the 2008 season, Regilio signed a minor league contract with the Houston Astros and was assigned to their Triple-A affiliate, the Round Rock Express. In 50 games for Round Rock, he had a 3.00 ERA and nine saves.

He became a free agent at the end of the season and signed a minor league contract with the Detroit Tigers. Regilio was later released by the Tigers on May 11, 2009.

Regilio has since become a baseball coach at New Smyrna Beach High School.
