= Héctor Ortiz (baseball) =

Puerto Rican baseball player and coach (1969–2024)

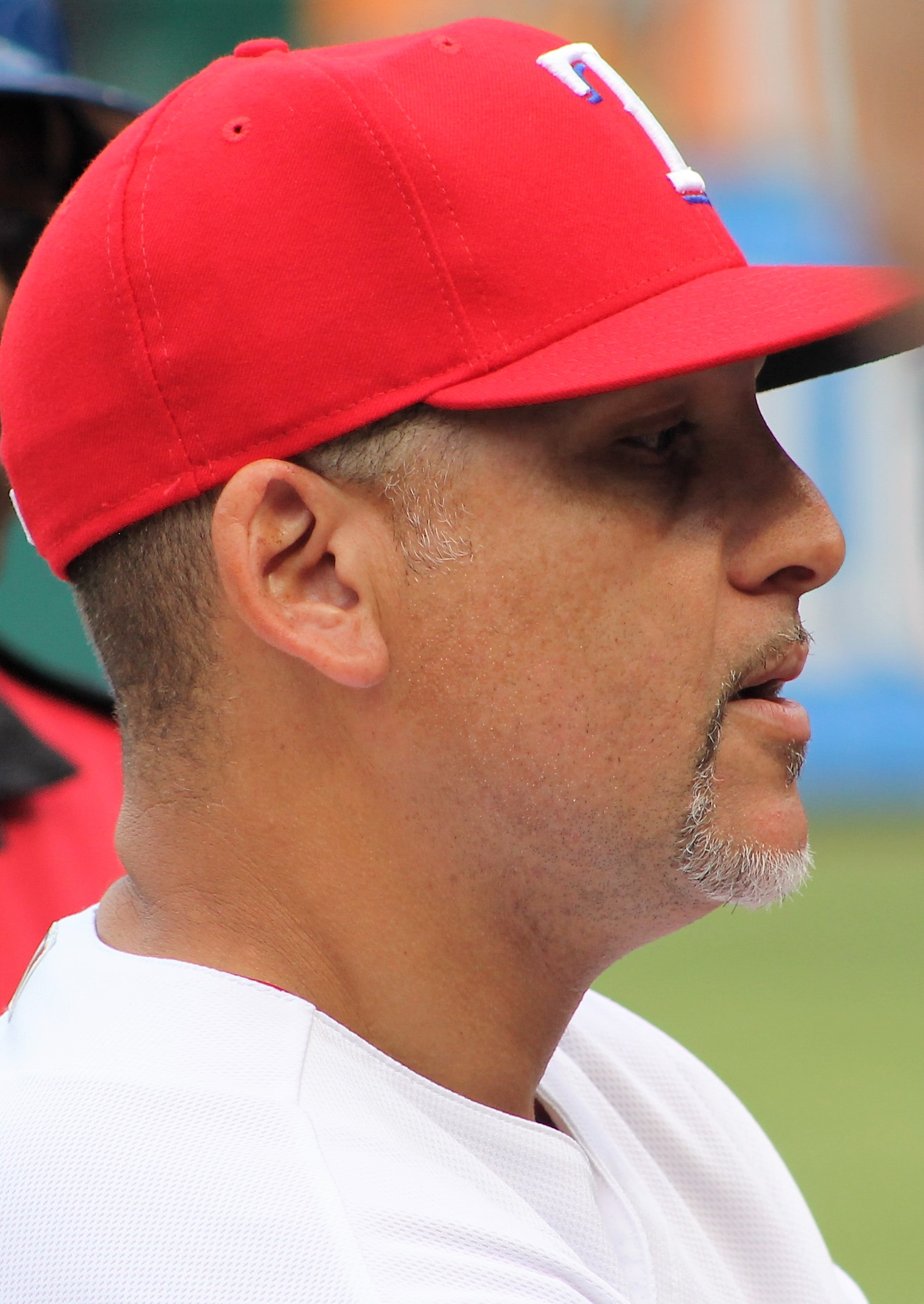
- Ortiz during a game in 2016
- Catcher
- Born: October 14, 1969; Río Piedras, Puerto Rico
- Died: February 28, 2024 (aged 54); Phoenix, Arizona, U.S.
- Batted: Right Threw: Right

MLB debut
- September 14, 1998, for the Kansas City Royals

Last MLB appearance
- May 15, 2002, for the Texas Rangers

MLB statistics
- Batting average: .288
- Home runs: 1
- Runs batted in: 18
- Stats at Baseball Reference

Teams
- As player: Kansas City Royals (1998, 2000–2001); Texas Rangers (2002); As coach: Texas Rangers (2015–2020)

Héctor Ortiz Montañez (October 14, 1969 – February 28, 2024) was a Puerto Rican professional baseball catcher and coach. He played in Major League Baseball (MLB) for the Kansas City Royals and Texas Rangers. He also coached in MLB for the Texas Rangers.

== Playing career ==
Ortiz was born on October 14, 1969, in Río Piedras, Puerto Rico. He attended Luis Hernaiz Verone High School in Canóvanas, Puerto Rico. Ortiz attended Paris Junior College in Paris, Texas, and Ranger College in Ranger, Texas. He was drafted by the Los Angeles Dodgers in the 35th round of the 1988 MLB draft.

Ortiz's career spanned from 1988 through 2005. He spent eight seasons in the Los Angeles Dodgers organization, five in the Kansas City Royals, two in the Chicago Cubs, and one each in the Colorado Rockies, Tampa Bay Rays, Texas Rangers, and Washington Nationals organizations.

=== Major leagues ===
Ortiz appeared in 86 Major League games in 1998, 2000, and 2001 for the Kansas City Royals. He played in seven games with the Texas Rangers in 2002.

== Coaching career ==
=== Minor leagues ===
Retiring after the 2005 season, Ortiz rejoined the Texas Rangers as a minor league coach. In 2006, 2007, and 2008 he was the hitting coach for the Spokane Indians of the Class A Short Season Northwest League. He was the manager of the Hickory Crawdads of the Class A South Atlantic League in 2009 and their hitting coach in 2010. In 2011, he was the manager for the Arizona Rangers of the Rookie-level Arizona League. From 2011 through 2014, Ortiz served as the Rangers Minor League catching coordinator. After being let go from the major league staff following the 2020 season, Ortiz returned to minor league coaching as a member of the team's player development staff until his death.

In the offseasons, Ortiz also managed in the Puerto Rican Winter League.

=== Major leagues ===
Ortiz served as the Texas Rangers first base coach in 2015, 2016, and 2017. In 2018, he served as the major league bullpen coach. Ortiz returned to the role of first base coach of the Texas Rangers for the 2019 season. He served as the Rangers catching coach in 2020 and was let go following that season.

== Death ==
Ortiz died from pancreatic cancer in Phoenix, Arizona, on February 28, 2024. He was 54.

== See also ==
- List of Major League Baseball players from Puerto Rico
