= Jason Jones (baseball) =

American baseball player (born 1976)

- Outfielder
- Born: October 17, 1976 (age 49); Marietta, Georgia, U.S.
- Batted: Both Threw: Right

MLB debut
- July 23, 2003, for the Texas Rangers

Last MLB appearance
- September 28, 2003, for the Texas Rangers

MLB statistics
- Batting average: .215
- Home runs: 3
- Runs batted in: 11
- Stats at Baseball Reference

Teams
- Texas Rangers (2003)

Jason Dewey Jones (born October 17, 1976) is an American former professional baseball outfielder. He played part of one season in Major League Baseball, appearing in 40 games for the Texas Rangers in 2003.
