= Reynaldo Garcia =

Dominican baseball player (born 1974)

- Pitcher
- Born: April 15, 1974 (age 52); Nayua, Dominican Republic
- Batted: Right Threw: Right

MLB debut
- July 19, 2002, for the Texas Rangers

Last MLB appearance
- September 26, 2003, for the Texas Rangers

MLB statistics
- Win–loss record: 0–0
- Earned run average: 11.25
- Strikeouts: 17
- Stats at Baseball Reference

Teams
- Texas Rangers (2002–2003)

Reynaldo Garcia (born April 15, 1974) is a Dominican former Major League Baseball (MLB) pitcher who played for the Texas Rangers from 2002-2003.

Garcia spent all of the 2004 season on the disabled list and played for the independent Lancaster Barnstormers of the Atlantic League in the 2005 season.
