= Jason Romano =

American baseball player (born 1979)

- Utility player
- Born: June 24, 1979 (age 45); Tampa, Florida, U.S.
- Batted: Right Threw: Right

MLB debut
- April 17, 2002, for the Texas Rangers

Last MLB appearance
- July 9, 2005, for the Cincinnati Reds

MLB statistics
- Batting average: .204
- Home runs: 2
- Runs batted in: 12
- Stats at Baseball Reference

Teams
- Texas Rangers (2002); Colorado Rockies (2002); Los Angeles Dodgers (2003); Tampa Bay Devil Rays (2004); Cincinnati Reds (2004–2005)

Jason Anthony Romano (born June 24, 1979) is a former professional baseball player. He played parts of four seasons in Major League Baseball for five different teams from 2002 until 2005.

== Professional career ==
=== Rangers ===
In 1997, Romano was a supplemental first-round pick drafted directly out of Hillsborough High School by the Texas Rangers at the age of 17. After spending his first five professional season in the Rangers' minor league system, Romano made his major league debut in April 2002 against the Anaheim Angels.

=== Rockies ===
In July 2002, Romano was part of a 4-player trade that sent him to the Colorado Rockies. He was initially sent to the minor league Colorado Springs Sky Sox, where he batted .310 to earn a September call-up. In 18 games down the stretch, Romano hit .324 while playing four different positions.

=== Dodgers ===
During the 2002-03 offseason, the Los Angeles Dodgers acquired Romano to be their super utility player. Romano had just three hits in 36 at bats while splitting the year between the Dodgers and their top farm team, the Las Vegas 51s.

=== 2004: Devil Rays and Reds ===
At the end of spring training in 2004, Romano was again traded, this time to his hometown team, the Tampa Bay Devil Rays. However, his stay with his hometown team was brief, as the Devil Rays placed him on waivers after just four games. He was claimed by the Cincinnati Reds, and he split the rest of the year between the Reds and the minor league Louisville Bats.

=== Remaining career ===
Romano began the 2005 season with the Bats, and was called up in late May. In two brief stints with the Reds, he batted .267. He became a free agent at the end of July, signing with the Florida Marlins. However, after just one game for their Albuquerque Isotopes farm team, Romano suffered a season-ending injury. In 2006, he briefly returned to the Devil Rays' system, but was released after batting just .105 in 13 games with the Durham Bulls. Romano continued to play for various minor league teams before retiring from baseball in spring 2009.

== After baseball ==
Currently, Romano is an agent for Excel Sports Management as well as serving as a baseball analyst for several Tampa radio stations. He is also involved in several business ventures. He and his wife, Ellen, currently reside in Tampa Bay, Florida.
