= Ramón Nivar =

Dominican baseball player (born 1980)

- Infielder / Outfielder
- Born: February 22, 1980 (age 46); San Cristobal, Dominican Republic
- Batted: Right Threw: Right

MLB debut
- July 30, 2003, for the Texas Rangers

Last MLB appearance
- June 11, 2005, for the Baltimore Orioles

MLB statistics
- Batting average: .223
- Runs: 13
- Runs batted in: 12
- Stats at Baseball Reference

Teams
- Texas Rangers (2003–2004); Baltimore Orioles (2005)

Ramón A. Nivar Martínez (born February 22, 1980) is a Dominican former Major League Baseball (MLB) utility player who played for the Texas Rangers and Baltimore Orioles from 2003 to 2005.

== Career ==
Nivar was original signed as an undrafted free agent by the Texas Rangers in 1998. In 2003 with the Double-A Frisco RoughRiders, he hit .347 and was selected as Baseball America 2nd Team Minor League All-Star, Texas League All-Star Second Baseman and Texas League Minor League Player of the Year. He also played for the World team in the 2003 All-Star Futures Game.

Nivar made his Major League debut on July 30, 2003, for the Rangers against the Boston Red Sox as a ninth inning defensive replacement. He played in 28 games with the Rangers that season, hitting .211 in 90 at bats. After playing in seven more games in 2004 he was traded to the Baltimore Orioles in March 2005, appearing in seven games with the Orioles that season.

Before 2006 Nivar signed a minor league contract with the St. Louis Cardinals but did not make the roster. He played some games for the independent York Revolution in 2007 and then signed a minor league contract with the San Diego Padres at the end of the season.

Nivar was released during 2008 spring training. He later played in the Can-Am League for the New Jersey Jackals and finished the season with for the Newark Bears of the Atlantic League, batting .327.

In 2009, Los Angeles Dodgers signed Nivar to a minor league contract and assigned him to Double-A Chattanooga Lookouts. On May 4, 2010, Ramon was promoted to triple-A Albequrque

Nivar is a career .223 hitter in 42 Major League games, including 13 runs, 12 RBI and five stolen bases without home runs.
