= Ryan Snare =

American baseball player

- Pitcher
- Born: February 8, 1979 (age 47); Clearwater, Florida, U.S.
- Batted: Left Threw: Left

MLB debut
- August 6, 2004, for the Texas Rangers

Last MLB appearance
- August 6, 2004, for the Texas Rangers

MLB statistics
- Win–loss record: 0–0
- Earned run average: 10.80
- Strikeouts: 0
- Stats at Baseball Reference

Teams
- Texas Rangers (2004)

Ryan Delbert Snare (born February 8, 1979) is an American former professional baseball pitcher. He played in Major League Baseball (MLB) for the Texas Rangers.

== Career ==
He appeared in 1 game in 2004 for the Texas Rangers. He pitched 3 1/3 innings of relief and gave up 4 earned runs.

In 2000, pitching for the University of North Carolina, Snare went 10–1 with a 3.14 ERA and was drafted by the Cincinnati Reds in the 2nd round of the 2000 Major League Baseball draft. On July 11, 2002, he was traded to the Florida Marlins along with Juan Encarnación and Wilton Guerrero for Ryan Dempster. Exactly one year later, he was traded to the Texas Rangers as part of a package for veteran closer Ugueth Urbina. In 2004 with the Triple-A Oklahoma RedHawks, Snare went 11–6 with a 4.72 ERA and made his major league debut with the Rangers. On July 20, 2005, he was released by the Rangers and signed with the San Diego Padres on July 26. A free agent at the end of the year, he signed with the Kansas City Royals for the 2006 season. He made 7 starts for Double-A Wichita before being released on May 13.
