= Erasmo Ramirez (left-handed pitcher) =

American baseball player (born 1976)

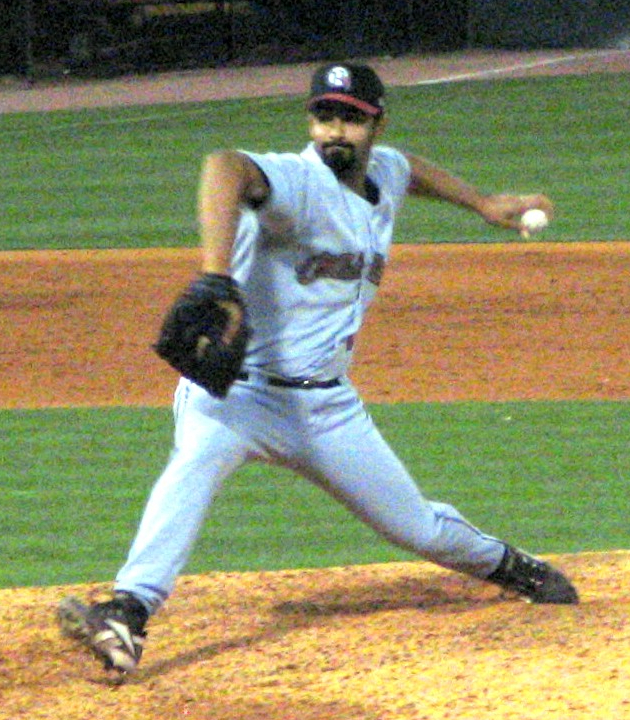
- Ramirez with the Oklahoma RedHawks in 2006
- Pitcher
- Born: April 29, 1976 (age 50); Santa Ana, California, U.S.
- Batted: Left Threw: Left

MLB debut
- April 30, 2003, for the Texas Rangers

Last MLB appearance
- July 13, 2007, for the Florida Marlins

MLB statistics
- Win–loss record: 8–4
- Earned run average: 3.95
- Strikeouts: 56
- Stats at Baseball Reference

Teams
- Texas Rangers (2003–2005); Oakland Athletics (2007); Florida Marlins (2007)

Erasmo Ramirez (born April 29, 1976) is an American former professional baseball relief pitcher. He played in Major League Baseball (MLB) for the Texas Rangers, Oakland Athletics, and Florida Marlins.

== Biography ==
Ramirez, a first-generation Mexican American, played high school baseball for Saddleback High School in Santa Ana, California, college baseball for the Cal State Fullerton Titans and collegiate summer baseball for the Kenosha Kroakers of the Northwoods League. The San Francisco Giants drafted Ramirez in the 11th round (338th overall pick) in the 1998 MLB draft. He spent 3 1/2 seasons with the Giants organization before being traded with Todd Ozias and Chris Magruder for Andrés Galarraga on July 24, 2001.

Texas Rangers

Ramirez made his major league debut with the Texas Rangers in 2003. That season, he compiled a 3–1 record with a 3.86 ERA and 28 strikeouts in 49 innings pitched and allowed just 9 walks. He played parts of 2004 and 2005 in MLB with the Rangers.

In 2006, after the Rangers had signed more relievers, Ramirez was optioned to the Oklahoma Redhawks, their Pacific Coast League Triple-A affiliate. Ramirez spent the entire 2006 season with the Redhawks and then became a free agent.

Oakland Athletics

On November 20, 2006, the Oakland Athletics signed Ramirez to a minor league contract. He began the 2007 season with their Triple-A affiliate, the Sacramento River Cats, and was promoted to the major league club on May 25. Ramirez played three games for the Athletics; he also had an 18-day stretch during which he did not play at all. Ramirez was designated for assignment by the Athletics on June 16, 2007, and became a free agent.

Florida Marlins

The Florida Marlins signed Ramirez on June 20, 2007, and assigned him to Triple-A Albuquerque of the Pacific Coast League. On July 2, 2007, Ramirez had his contract purchased by the Marlins and he returned to the major leagues. He played just four games for the Marlins and was designated for assignment on July 13, 2007, and was outrighted to Triple-A five days later.

Ramirez signed a minor league contract with the Milwaukee Brewers in January 2008, and played for their Triple-A team, the Nashville Sounds, during the 2008 season. He became a free agent after the season and signed a minor league contract with the Chicago White Sox, but did not play for any of their farm teams.

Ramirez had excellent control of his pitches and did not walk many batters. He walked just 1.74 batters per 9 innings in 114 major league innings.

== Sources ==
- The ESPN Baseball Encyclopedia – Gary Gillette, Peter Gammons, Pete Palmer. Publisher: Sterling Publishing, 2005. Format: Paperback, 1824pp. Language: English. ISBN 1-4027-4771-3
