= Tony Mounce =

American baseball pitcher (born 1975)

- Pitcher
- Born: February 8, 1975 (age 51); Sacramento, California, U.S.
- Batted: Left Threw: Left

Professional debut
- MLB: June 13, 2003, for the Texas Rangers
- NPB: April 7, 2004, for the Yakult Swallows

Last appearance
- MLB: September 22, 2003, for the Texas Rangers
- NPB: August 3, 2004, for the Yakult Swallows

MLB statistics
- Win–loss record: 1–5
- Earned run average: 7.11
- Strikeouts: 30

NPB statistics
- Win–loss record: 3–6
- Earned run average: 6.05
- Strikeouts: 41
- Stats at Baseball Reference

Teams
- Texas Rangers (2003); Yakult Swallows (2004)

Anthony David Mounce (born February 8, 1975) is an American former Major League Baseball pitcher. He pitched in 11 games (starting all 11) for the Texas Rangers in 2003, winning 1 and losing 5.

Mounce was originally selected by the Houston Astros in the 7th round of the 1994 Major League Baseball draft. Over the next five seasons, he worked his way up to the Astros' farm system as a starting pitcher. In 1999, after having been converted into a relief pitcher, he made it to their Class AAA team, the New Orleans Zephyrs. He pitched 14 games (11 innings) with a 2.45 ERA, but was released by the Astros at the end of spring training, 2000.

Mounce was signed by the Rangers on May 1, and they began his conversion back into a starter. After missing the entire 2001 season, he once again started his climb up the organizational ladder, and by mid-2003 he had finally made it all the way to the major leagues, making his debut against the Florida Marlins in an interleague game, which the Rangers lost 8–0.

Mounce gained his lone major league win on July 3 against the Anaheim Angels. It was not a clear-cut victory, as Mounce gave up 3 runs on 6 hits in 5 1/3 innings, but the Rangers' bullpen held on for a 6–5 victory. Three weeks later, Mounce was sent back to the minors. He received a September call-up, pitching 3 more games, and was then released after the season. Mounce's major league career ended, though he did pitch part of 2004 with the Yakult Swallows.
