= 2014 Texas Rangers season =

2014 Texas Rangers
- Cap insignia for the 2014 Texas Rangers
- League: American League
- Division: West
- Ballpark: Rangers Ballpark in Arlington
- City: Arlington, Texas
- Record: 67–95 (.414)
- Divisional place: 5th
- Owners: Rangers Baseball Express (Ray Davis and Bob R. Simpson)
- General managers: Jon Daniels
- Managers: Ron Washington (resigned on September 5), Tim Bogar
- Television: Fox Sports Southwest; KTXA (Steve Busby, Tom Grieve)
- Radio: KESN ESPN Radio 103.3 FM (English) (Eric Nadel, Matt Hicks); KZMP 1540 AM (Spanish) (Eleno Orlenas, Jerry Romo)
- Stats: ESPN.com; Baseball Reference

The 2014 Texas Rangers season was the Rangers' 54th season of the franchise and the 43rd since the team relocated to Arlington, Texas. The Rangers failed to improve on their 91–72 record from 2013. To make matters worse, the team suffered from injuries throughout the season and spent a substantial part of the season in last place in the American League West, at one point having a streak of 8–34. Manager Ron Washington resigned on September 5, 2014, citing personal issues. Despite finishing the season with a 13–3 stretch, The Rangers were unable to escape the American League cellar, but did manage to finish 67–95 and third worst in Major League Baseball (MLB), ahead of the Colorado Rockies and Arizona Diamondbacks of the National League. This was the Rangers' first losing season since 2008, and first last place finish in the division since 2007.

The Rangers used 40 different pitchers during the season, thus setting a new MLB record. The team played seven extra inning games, the fewest of any MLB team in 2014.

== Season standings ==
=== American League West ===
AL West
Team	W	L	Pct.	GB	Home	Road
Los Angeles Angels of Anaheim	98	64	.605	—	52‍–‍29	46‍–‍35
Oakland Athletics	88	74	.543	10	48‍–‍33	40‍–‍41
Seattle Mariners	87	75	.537	11	41‍–‍40	46‍–‍35
Houston Astros	70	92	.432	28	38‍–‍43	32‍–‍49
Texas Rangers	67	95	.414	31	33‍–‍48	34‍–‍47

=== American League Wild Card ===
Division leaders
Team	W	L	Pct.
Los Angeles Angels of Anaheim	98	64	.605
Baltimore Orioles	96	66	.593
Detroit Tigers	90	72	.556

Wild Card teams (Top 2 teams qualify for postseason)
Team	W	L	Pct.	GB
Kansas City Royals	89	73	.549	+1
Oakland Athletics	88	74	.543	—
Seattle Mariners	87	75	.537	1
Cleveland Indians	85	77	.525	3
New York Yankees	84	78	.519	4
Toronto Blue Jays	83	79	.512	5
Tampa Bay Rays	77	85	.475	11
Chicago White Sox	73	89	.451	15
Boston Red Sox	71	91	.438	17
Houston Astros	70	92	.432	18
Minnesota Twins	70	92	.432	18
Texas Rangers	67	95	.414	21

=== Record vs. opponents ===
2014 American League record Source: MLB Standings Grid – 2014
Team	BAL	BOS	CWS	CLE	DET	HOU	KC	LAA	MIN	NYY	OAK	SEA	TB	TEX	TOR	NL
Baltimore	—	11–8	5–1	3–4	1–5	4–3	3–4	4–2	4–3	13–6	2–4	5–2	12–7	6–1	11–8	12–8
Boston	8–11	—	4–3	2–5	1–5	4–3	6–1	2–5	4–2	7–12	3–4	1–5	9–10	4–2	7–12	9–11
Chicago	1–5	3–4	—	9–10	9–10	3–3	6–13	1–5	9–10	2–5	4–3	3–4	5–2	2–4	5–2	11–9
Cleveland	4–3	5–2	10–9	—	8–11	5–2	10–9	2–5	11–8	4–3	2–4	2–4	4–2	6–1	2–4	10–10
Detroit	5–1	5–1	10–9	11–8	—	4–3	13–6	3–4	9–10	3–4	5–2	2–4	3–4	4–3	1–5	12–8
Houston	3–4	3–4	3–3	2–5	3–4	—	3–3	7–12	3–3	4–2	8–11	9–10	2–5	11–8	4–3	5–15
Kansas City	4–3	1–6	13–6	9–10	6–13	3–3	—	3–3	11–8	4–3	5–2	2–5	4–2	5–1	4–3	15–5
Los Angeles	2–4	5–2	5–1	5–2	4–3	12–7	3–3	—	7–0	2–4	10–9	7–12	5–2	14–5	5–2	12–8
Minnesota	3–4	2–4	10–9	8–11	10–9	3–3	8–11	0–7	—	3–4	1–6	5–2	2–4	2–5	4–2	9–11
New York	6–13	12–7	5–2	3–4	4–3	2–4	3–4	4–2	4–3	—	2–4	3–3	8–11	4–3	11–8	13–7
Oakland	4–2	4–3	3–4	4–2	2–5	11–8	2–5	9–10	6–1	4–2	—	9–10	4–2	9–10	4–3	13–7
Seattle	2–5	5–1	4–3	4–2	4–2	10–9	5–2	12–7	2–5	3–3	10–9	—	4–3	9–10	4–3	9–11
Tampa Bay	7–12	10–9	2–5	2–4	4–3	5–2	2–4	2–5	4–2	11–8	2–4	3–4	—	5–2	8–11	10–10
Texas	1–6	2–4	4–2	1–6	3–4	8–11	1–5	5–14	5–2	3–4	10–9	10–9	2–5	—	2–4	10–10
Toronto	8–11	12–7	2–5	4–2	5–1	3–4	3–4	2–5	2–4	8–11	3–4	3–4	11–8	4–2	—	13–7

=== Game log ===
Legend
Rangers Win	Rangers Loss	Game postponed

2014 Game Log (67-95)
March (0-1)

#	Date	Opponent	Score/Box	Win	Loss	Save	Attendance	Record
1	March 31	Phillies	10–14	C. Lee (1–0)	P. Figueroa (0–1)		49,031	0–1

April (15-12)

#	Date	Opponent	Score/Box	Win	Loss	Save	Attendance	Record
2	April 1	Phillies	3–2	J. Soria (1–0)	M. Hollands (0–1)		29,530	1–1
3	April 2	Phillies	4–3	S. Rosin (1–0)	J. Papelbon (0–1)		28,282	2–1
4	April 4	@ Rays	1-8	J. Odorizzi 1-0	J. Saunders 0-1		14,304	2–2
5	April 5	@ Rays	4-5	B. Gomes 1-0	N. Cotts 0-1	G. Balfour 1	30,364	2–3
6	April 6	@ Rays	3-0	Y. Darvish 1-0	J. Peralta 0-1	J. Soria 1	22,569	3–3
7	April 7	@ Red Sox	1-5	J. Lackey 2-0	T. Scheppers 0-1		35,842	3–4
8	April 8	@ Red Sox	10-7	M. Pérez 1-0	F. Doubront 1-1		34,142	4–4
9	April 9	@ Red Sox	2-4	A. Miller 1–0	A. Ogando 0–1	K. Uehara 2	33,585	4–5
10	April 11	Astros	1-0 (12)	J. Frasor 1-0	B. Peacock 0-1		36,150	5–5
11	April 12	Astros	5-6 (10)	K. Chapman 1-0	J. Soria 1-1	A. Bass 2	42,577	5–6
12	April 13	Astros	1-0	M. Pérez 2-0	B. Oberholtzer 0-3	A. Ogando 1	38,698	6–6
13	April 14	Mariners	1-7	R. Elías 1-1	C. Lewis 0-1		23,081	6–7
14	April 15	Mariners	5-0	R. Ross 1-0	B. Beavan 0-1		26,628	7–7
15	April 16	Mariners	3-2	P. Figueroa 1-1	F. Rodney 0-1		27,396	8–7
16	April 17	Mariners	8-6	P. Figueroa 2-1	J. Beimel 0-1	J. Soria 2	29,024	9–7
17	April 18	White Sox	12-0	M. Pérez 3-0	F. Paulino 0-2		40,671	10–7
18	April 19	White Sox	6-3	C. Lewis 1-1	J. Quintana 1-1	J. Soria 3	44,811	11–7
19	April 20	White Sox	2-16	E. Johnson 1-1	R. Ross 1-1		35,402	11–8
20	April 21	@ Athletics	4-3	N. Cotts 1-1	S. Doolittle 0-1	J. Soria 4	13,297	12–8
21	April 22	@ Athletics	5-4	A. Ogando 1-1	L. Gregerson 0-1	J. Soria 5	15,744	13–8
22	April 23	@ Athletics	3-0	M. Pérez 4-0	S. Gray 3-1		18,340	14–8
23	April 25	@ Mariners	5-6	Y. Medina 1-1	N. Cotts 1-2	F. Rodney 4	31,149	14–9
24	April 26	@ Mariners	6-3	A. Poreda 1-0	C. Furbush 0-2	J. Soria 6	30,038	15–9
25	April 27	@ Mariners	5-6	D. Farquhar 1-0	A. Ogando 1-2	F. Rodney 5	26,300	15–10
26	April 28	Athletics	0-4	S. Gray 4-1	Y. Darvish 1-1		28,548	15–11
27	April 29	Athletics	3-9	S. Kazmir 4-0	M. Pérez 4-1		30,221	15–12
28	April 30	Athletics	1-12	J. Chavez 2-0	R. Ross 1-2		32,979	15–13

May (13-15)

#	Date	Opponent	Score/Box	Win	Loss	Save	Attendance	Record
29	May 2	@ Angels	5-2	C. Lewis 2-1	H. Santiago 0-5	J. Soria 7	42,989	16–13
30	May 3	@ Angels	3-5	G. Richards 3-0	S. Tolleson 0-1	J. Smith 3	39,107	16–14
31	May 4	@ Angels	14-3	Y. Darvish 2-1	T. Skaggs 2-1		37,765	17–14
32	May 5	@ Rockies	2-8	J. Lyles 4-0	M. Pérez 4-2		26,242	17–15
33	May 6	@ Rockies	1-12	J. Nicasio 4-1	R. Ross 1-3		27,838	17–16
34	May 7	Rockies	2-9	J. de la Rosa 4-3	C. Lewis 2-2		29,467	17–17
35	May 8	Rockies	5-0	M. Harrison 1-0	F. Morales 3-2		27,617	18–17
36	May 9	Red Sox	8-0	Y. Darvish 3-1	C. Buchholz 2-3		45,392	19–17
37	May 10	Red Sox	3-8	J. Lester 4-4	M. Pérez 4-3		47,964	19–18
38	May 11	Red Sox	2-5	J. Lackey 5-2	R. Ross 1-3	K. Uehara 9	41,407	19–19
39	May 12	@ Astros	4-0	C. Lewis 3-2	B. Peacock 0-4		14,617	20–19
40	May 13	@ Astros	0-8	D. Keuchel 0-2	M. Harrison 1-1		14,028	20–20
41	May 14	@ Astros	4-5	C. Qualls 1-1	N. Martínez 0-1		17,783	20–21
42	May 16	Blue Jays	0-2	D. Hutchison 2-3	Y. Darvish 3-2		39,129	20–22
43	May 17	Blue Jays	2-4	S. Delabar 3-0	N. Cotts 1-3	C. Janssen 3	39,723	20–23
44	May 18	Blue Jays	6-2	A. Poreda 2-0	R. A. Dickey 4-4		43,671	21–23
45	May 20	Mariners	2-6	H. Iwakuma 3-0	C. Lewis 3-3		43,706	21–24
46	May 21	Mariners	4-3	N. Tepsech 1-0	C. Young 3-2	J. Soria 8	43,654	22–24
47	May 22	@ Tigers	9-2	Y. Darvish 4-2	R. Ray 1-1		40,768	23–24
48	May 23	@ Tigers	2-7	A. Sánchez 2-2	S. Baker 0-1		39,835	23–25
49	May 24	@ Tigers	12-2	N. Martínez 1-1	R. Porcello 7-2		43,447	24–25
50	May 25	@ Tigers	12-4	C. Lewis 4-3	J. Verlander 5-4		42,583	25–25
51	May 26	@ Twins	7-2	N. Tepesch 2-0	K. Correia 2-6		30,571	26–25
52	May 27	@ Twins	3-4	G. Perkins 2-0	J. Soria 1-2		22,702	26–26
53	May 28	@ Twins	1-0	S. Tolleson 1-1	J. Burton 1-2	J. Soria 9	26,472	27–26
54	May 29	@ Twins	5-4	A. Ogando 2-2	C. Fien 3-2	J. Soria 10	28,170	28–26
55	May 30	@ Nationals	2-9	S. Strasburg 4-4	C. Lewis 4-4		31,659	28–27
56	May 31	@ Nationals	2-10	D. Fister 3-1	N. Tepesch 2-1		35,164	28–28

June (9-17)

#	Date	Opponent	Score/Box	Win	Loss	Save	Attendance	Record
57	June 1	@ Nationals	2-0	Y. Darvish 5-2	T. Roark 3-4	J. Soria 11	32,813	29–28
58	June 3	Orioles	3-8	B. Matusz 2-1	A. Ogando 2-3		31,542	29-29
59	June 4	Orioles	5-6	B. Norris 4-5	N. Martinez 1-2	Z. Britton 5	27,934	29–30
60	June 5	Orioles	8-6	R. Ross 2-4	B. Matusz 2-2	J. Soria 12	34,254	30-30
61	June 6	Indians	6-4	Y. Darvish 6-2	M. Rzepczynski 0-2	J. Soria 13	38,348	31–30
62	June 7	Indians	3-8	J. Tomlin 4-2	N. Tepesch 2-2		34,633	31-31
63	June 8	Indians	2-3	J. Masterson 4-4	J. Saunders 0-2	C. Allen 6	34,613	31–32
64	June 9	Indians	7-17	S. Atchison 3-0	N. Martinez 1-3		29,362	31–33
65	June 10	Marlins	5-8	B. Morris 5-0	J. Frasor 1-1	S. Cishek 15	28,845	31–34
66	June 11	Marlins	6-0	Y. Darvish 7-2	J. Turner 2-4		31,512	32–34
67	June 13	@ Mariners	1-0	S. Tolleson 1-2	F. Hernández 8-2	J. Soria 14	22,039	33–34
68	June 14	@ Mariners	4-3	N. Cotts 2-3	F. Rodney 1-3	J. Soria 15	27,700	34-34
69	June 15	@ Mariners	1-5	H. Iwakuma 5-3	N. Martinez 1-4		39,196	34–35
70	June 16	@ Athletics	14-8	C. Lewis 5-4	D. Pomeranz 5-4		12,412	35-35
71	June 17	@ Athletics	6-10	T. Milone 5-3	Y. Darvish 7-3		21,288	35–36
72	June 18	@ Athletics	2-4	S. Gray 7-3	N. Tepesch 2-3	S. Doolittle 9	23,175	35–37
73	June 20	@ Angels	3-7	G. Richards 7-2	J. Saunders 0-3		41,637	35–38
74	June 21	@ Angels	2-3 (10)	M. Morin 1-1	N. Cotts 2-4		37,026	35–39
75	June 22	@ Angels	5-2	M. Shoemaker 5-1	Y. Darvish 7-4		37,191	35–40
76	June 24	Tigers	8-2	D. Smyly 4-6	C. Lewis 5-5		35,526	35–41
77	June 25	Tigers	6-8	A. Sánchez 5-2	J. Saunders 0-4	J. Nathan 16	34,254	35–42
78	June 26	Tigers	0-6	R. Porcello 10-4	N. Martinez 1-5		34,989	35–43
79	June 27	Twins	5-4	N. Tepesch 3-3	K. Correia 4-9		38,111	36–43
80	June 28	Twins	5-0	Y. Darvish 8-4	P. Hughes 8-4		30,620	37–43
81	June 29	Twins	2-3	K. Gibson 7-6	J. Soria 1-3	G. Perkins 20	36,779	37–44
82	June 30	@ Orioles	1-7	U. Jiménez 3-8	J. Saunders 0-5		15,252	37–45

July (6-20)

#	Date	Opponent	Score/Box	Win	Loss	Save	Attendance	Record
83	July 1	@ Orioles	3-8	T. J. McFarland (1-1)	N. Martinez (1–6)	–	19,150	37–46
84	July 2	@ Orioles	4-6	B. Brach (2–0)	N. Cotts (2–5)	Z. Britton (11)	13,478	37–47
85	July 3	@ Orioles	2-5	W. Chen (8–3)	S. Baker (0–2)	Z. Britton (12)	24,535	37–48
86	July 4	@ Mets	5-6	J. Mejía (5–3)	A. Poreda (2–1)	–	30,377	37–49
87	July 5	@ Mets	5-3	C. Lewis (6–5)	B. Colón (8–7)	J. Soria (16)	24,418	38–49
88	July 6	@ Mets	4-8	Z. Wheeler (4–8)	N. Tepesch (3–4)	–	25,213	38–50
89	July 7	Astros	7-12	J. Cosart (9–6)	M. Mikolas (0–1)	–	31,010	38–51
90	July 8	Astros	3-8	B. Peacock (3–5)	P. Irwin (0–1)	–	32,608	38–52
91	July 9	Astros	4-8	D. Keuchel (9–5)	Y. Darvish (8–5)	–	31,161	38–53
92	July 10	Angels	6-15	H. Santiago (1–7)	C. Lewis (6-6)	–	30,686	38–54
93	July 11	Angels	0-3	G. Richards (11–2)	N. Tepesch (3–5)	J. Smith (13)	38,402	38–55
94	July 12	Angels	2-5	J. Weaver (10–6)	M. Mikolas (0–2)	J. Smith (14)	37,253	38–56
95	July 13	Angels	7-10	T. Skaggs (5-5)	S. Baker (0–3)	J. Smith (15)	34,750	38–57
96	July 18	@ Blue Jays	5-1	Y. Darvish (9–5)	R. A. Dickey (7–10)	–	38,012	39–57
97	July 19	@ Blue Jays	1-4	M. Stroman (5–2)	C. Lewis (6–7)	A. Loup (3)	45,802	39–58
98	July 20	@ Blue Jays	6-9	T. Redmond (1–4)	N. Feliz (0–1)	A. Loup (4)	36,011	39–59
99	July 21	@ Yankees	4-2	M. Mikolas (1–2)	S. Greene (2–1)	J. Soria (17)	45,278	40–59
100	July 22	@ Yankees	1-2(14)	J. Francis (1–2)	N. Tepesch (3–6)	–	37,669	40–60
101	July 23	@ Yankees	1-2(5)	D. Phelps (5–4)	y. Darvish (9–6)	–	37,585	40–61
102	July 24	@ Yankees	2-4	B. McCarthy (5–10)	C. Lewis (6–8)	D. Robertson (25)	45,105	40–62
103	July 25	Athletics	4-1	J. Williams (2–4)	J. Hammel (8-8)	N. Feliz (1)	35,582	41–62
104	July 26	Athletics	1-5	S. Gray (12–3)	N. Tepesch (3–7)		34,651	41–63
105	July 27	Athletics	3-9	S. Kazmir (12–3)	M. Mikolas (1–3)		38,915	41–64
106	July 28	Yankees	4-2	Y. Darvish (10–6)	D. Phelps (5-5)	N. Feliz (2)	44,508	42–64
107	July 29	Yankees	11-12	B. McCarthy (6–10)	N. Martinez (1–7)	D. Robertson (27)	41,934	42–65
108	July 30	Yankees	3-2	C. Lewis (7–8)	H. Kuroda (7-7)	N. Feliz (3)	46,599	43–65

August (10-18)

#	Date	Opponent	Score/Box	Win	Loss	Save	Attendance	Record
109	August 1	@ Indians	2-12	D. Salazar (4-4)	J. Williams (2–5)		27,009	43–66
110	August 2	@ Indians	0-2	S. Atchison (4–0)	M. Mikolas (1–4)	C. Allen (14)	28,285	43–67
111	August 3	@ Indians	3-4 (12)	S. Atchison (5–0)	P. Klein (0–1)		18,422	43–68
112	August 4	@ White Sox	3-5 (7)	H. Noesí (6–8)	N. Martinez (1–8)		17,040	43–69
113	August 5	@ White Sox	16-0	C. Lewis (8-8)	J. Danks (9–7)		21,827	44–69
114	August 6	@ White Sox	3-1	N. Tepesch (4–7)	C. Sale (10–2)	N. Feliz (4)	18,898	45–69
115	August 8	@ Astros	3-4	J. Veras (2–0)	N. Cotts (2–6)	C. Qualls (14)	24,256	45–70
116	August 9	@ Astros	3-8	S. Feldman (6–8)	Y. Darvish (10–7)		24,019	45–71
117	August 10	@ Astros	6-2	N. Martinez (2–8)	D. Keuchel (10–8)		19,239	46–71
118	August 11	Rays	0-7	D. Smyly (7–10)	C. Lewis (8–9)		28,501	46–72
119	August 12	Rays	3-2 (14)	S. Baker (1–3)	C. Ramos (2–5)		35,642	47–72
120	August 13	Rays	1-10	C. Archer (8–6)	M. Mikolas (1–5)		29,870	47–73
121	August 14	Rays	3-6	J. Odorizzi (9-9)	R. Ross (2–5)	J. McGee (13)	28,940	47–74
122	August 15	Angels	4-5	G. Richards (13–4)	N. Martinez (2–9)	H. Street (32)	31,465	47–75
123	August 16	Angels	4-5	M. Shoemaker (11–4)	C. Lewis (8–10)	H. Street (33)	32,209	47–76
124	August 17	Angels	3-2	N. Feliz (1-1)	H. Street (1-1)		28,942	48–76
125	August 19	@ Marlins	3-4 (10)	S. Dyson (2–0)	N. Cotts (2–7)		20,277	48–77
126	August 20	@ Marlins	5-4	N. Martinez (3–9)	N. Eovaldi (6–8)	N. Feliz (5)	16,674	49–77
127	August 22	Royals	3-6	Y. Ventura (10–9)	C. Lewis (8–11)	G. Holland (40)	26,991	49–78
128	August 23	Royals	3-6	J. Guthrie (10-10)	N. Tepesch (4–8)		27,400	49–79
129	August 24	Royals	3-1	S. Baker (2–3)	J. Vargas (10–6)	N. Feliz (6)	30,049	50–79
130	August 25	@ Mariners	2-0	M. Mikolas (2–5)	R. Elias (9–11)	N. Feliz (7)	21,620	51–79
131	August 26	@ Mariners	0-5	J. Paxton (4–1)	N. Martinez (3–10)		20,469	51–80
132	August 27	@ Mariners	12-4	C. Lewis (9–11)	E. Ramirez (1–6)		29,463	52–80
133	August 28	@ Astros	2-4	C. McHugh (7–9)	R. Mendez (0–1)	T. Sipp (2)	16,399	52–81
134	August 29	@ Astros	13-6	S. Baker (3-3)	B. Oberholtzer (4–10)		18,931	53–81
135	August 30	@ Astros	0-2	S. Feldman (8–10)	P. Klein		24,771	53–82
136	August 31	@ Astros	2-3	J. Veras (3–1)	N. Cotts (2–8)	C. Qualls (16)	19,024	53–83

September (14-12)

#	Date	Opponent	Score/Box	Win	Loss	Save	Attendance	Record
137	September 1	@ Royals	3-4	Y. Ventura (11–9)	C. Lewis (9–12)	G. Holland (41)	21,536	53–84
138	September 2	@ Royals	1-2	J. Frasor (4–1)	M. Kirkman (0–1)	A. Crow (3)	19,435	53–85
139	September 3	@ Royals	1-4	J. Vargas (11–7)	N. Tepesch (4–9)	G. Holland (42)	15,771	53–86
140	September 4	Mariners	2-10	R. Elias (10–12)	R. Ross (2–6)		26,965	53–87
141	September 5	Mariners	5-7	H. Iwakuma (14–6)	S. Baker (3–4)	F. Rodney (42)	23,428	53–88
142	September 6	Mariners	2-4	D. Farquhar (2–1)	N. Cotts (2–9)	F. Rodney (43)	29,552	53–89
143	September 7	Mariners	1-0	D. Holland (1–0)	J. Paxton (5–2)	N. Feliz (8)	26,851	54–89
144	September 9	Angels	3-9	H. Santiago (5–7)	C. Lewis (9–13)		26,054	54–90
145	September 10	Angels	1-8	M. Shoemaker (15–4)	N. Tepesch (4–10)		26,611	54–91
146	September 11	Angels	3-7	M. Morin (4–3)	N. Martinez (3–11)		27,129	54–92
147	September 12	Braves	2-1	P. Klein (1–2)	D. Carpenter (6–4)	N. Feliz (9)	19,835	55–92
148	September 13	Braves	3-2	L. Bonilla (1–0)	J. Teheran (13–12)	N. Cotts (1)	17,530	56–92
149	September 14	Braves	10-3	C. Lewis (10–13)	M. Minor (6–11)		17,574	57–92
150	September 16	@ Athletics	6-3	N. Tepesch (5–10)	S. Kazmir (14–9)	N. Feliz (10)	19,835	58–92
151	September 17	@ Athletics	6-1	R. Ross (3–6)	S. Doolittle (1–4)		17,530	59–92
152	September 18	@ Athletics	7-2	N. Martinez (4–11)	S. Gray (13–9)		17,574	60–92
153	September 19	@ Angels	12-3	L. Bonilla (2–0)	H. Santiago (5–9)		38,467	61–92
154	September 20	@ Angels	5-8	J. Weaver (18–8)	C. Lewis (10–14)	H. Street (39)	35,890	61–93
155	September 21	@ Angels	2-1	S. Tolleson (3–1)	H. Street (2-2)	N. Feliz (11)	27,166	62–93
156	September 22	Astros	4-3	D. Holland (2–0)	N. Tropeano (1–2)	N. Feliz (12)	28,717	63–93
157	September 23	Astros	2-1	N. Martinez (5–11)	B. Oberholtzer (5–13)	N. Cotts (2)	29,794	64–93
158	September 24	Astros	5-1	L. Bonilla (3–0)	S. Feldman (8–12)		28,003	65–93
159	September 25	Athletics	2-1	N. Feliz (2–1)	L. Gregerson (5-5)		33,696	66–93
160	September 26	Athletics	2-6	S. Kazmir (15–9)	N. Tepesch (5–11)		31,586	66–94
161	September 27	Athletics	5-4	S. Patton (1–0)	J. Samardzija (7–13)	N. Feliz (13)	35,326	67–94
162	September 28	Athletics	0-4	S. Gray (14–10)	N. Martinez (5–12)		36,381	67–95

=== Roster ===
2014 Texas Rangers
Roster
Pitchers: 57 Nathan Adcock; 25 Scott Baker; 59 Lisalverto Bonilla; 65 Alex Claudio; 56 Neal Cotts; 11 Yu Darvish; 62 Jon Edwards; 68 Ryan Feierabend; 30 Neftalí Feliz; 32 Pedro Figueroa; 44 Jason Frasor; 67 Justin Germano; 54 Matt Harrison; 45 Derek Holland; 47 Phil Irwin; 50 Michael Kirkman; 64 Phil Klein; 48 Colby Lewis; 22 Nick Martinez; 39 Daniel McCutchen; 55 Román Méndez; 36 Miles Mikolas; 19 Héctor Noesí; 41 Alexi Ogando; 44 Spencer Patton; 33 Martín Pérez; 49 Aaron Poreda; 19 Seth Rosin; 46 Robbie Ross; 39 Ben Rowen; 47 Joe Saunders; 52 Tanner Scheppers; 28 Joakim Soria; 23 Nick Tepesch; 37 Shawn Tolleson; 63 Matt West; 44 Jerome Williams	Catchers: 7 J. P. Arencibia; 61 Robinson Chirinos; 60 Chris Gimenez; 8 Geovany Soto; 6 Tomás Telis; Infielders: 1 Elvis Andrus; 29 Adrián Beltré; 28 Mike Carp; 84 Prince Fielder; 6 Kevin Kouzmanoff; 18 Mitch Moreland; 16 Donnie Murphy; 73,12 Rougned Odor; 21 Carlos Peña; 9 Adam Rosales; 3 Luis Sardiñas; 64 Brad Snyder; 12 Josh Wilson; Outfielders: 35 Jim Adduci; 15 Michael Choice; 17 Shin-Soo Choo; 2 Leonys Martín; 51 Alex Ríos; 19 Dan Robertson; 60 Guilder Rodríguez; 16 Ryan Rua; 20 Jake Smolinski	Manager: 27 Tim Bogar; 38 Ron Washington; Coaches: 27 Tim Bogar (bench); 66 Josh Frasier (bullpen catcher); 40 Andy Hawkins (bullpen); 5 Bobby Jones (assistant hitting) (bench); 31 Mike Maddux (pitching); 14 Dave Magadan (hitting); 4 Bengie Molina (first base); 24 Gary Pettis (third base)

== Player stats ==
=== Batting ===
Note: G = Games played; AB = At bats; R = Runs; H = Hits; 2B = Doubles; 3B = Triples; HR = Home runs; RBI = Runs batted in; SB = Stolen bases; BB = Walks; AVG = Batting average; SLG = Slugging average

Player	G	AB	R	H	2B	3B	HR	RBI	SB	BB	AVG	SLG
Elvis Andrus	157	619	72	163	35	1	2	41	27	46	.263	.333
Adrián Beltré	148	549	79	178	33	1	19	77	1	57	.324	.492
Leonys Martín	155	533	68	146	13	7	7	40	31	39	.274	.364
Alex Ríos	131	492	54	138	30	8	4	54	17	23	.280	.398
Shin-Soo Choo	123	455	58	110	19	1	13	40	3	58	.242	.374
Rougned Odor	114	386	39	100	14	7	9	48	4	17	.259	.402
Robinson Chirinos	93	306	36	73	15	0	13	40	0	17	.239	.415
Michael Choice	86	253	20	46	6	1	9	36	1	21	.182	.320
J.P. Arencibia	62	203	20	36	9	0	10	35	0	10	.177	.369
Daniel Robertson	70	177	23	48	9	1	0	21	6	17	.271	.333
Mitch Moreland	52	167	18	41	9	1	2	23	0	12	.246	.347
Adam Rosales	56	164	20	43	7	0	4	19	4	13	.262	.378
Prince Fielder	42	150	19	37	8	0	3	16	0	25	.247	.360
Luis Sardiñas	43	115	12	30	6	0	0	8	5	5	.261	.313
Donnie Murphy	45	112	11	22	3	0	4	14	0	11	.196	.330
Chris Gimenez	33	107	13	28	10	0	0	11	0	11	.262	.355
Ryan Rua	28	105	11	31	7	0	2	14	1	2	.295	.419
Jim Adduci	44	101	13	17	3	0	1	8	3	10	.168	.228
Jake Smolinski	24	86	12	30	5	0	3	12	0	3	.349	.512
Tomás Telis	18	68	7	17	2	0	0	8	0	1	.250	.279
Josh Wilson	24	67	7	16	4	0	0	8	1	2	.239	.299
Carlos Peña	18	59	4	8	3	0	1	2	1	4	.136	.237
Kevin Kouzmanoff	13	47	8	17	6	0	2	10	0	2	.362	.617
Mike Carp	17	40	2	5	0	0	0	4	0	5	.125	.125
Geovany Soto	10	38	5	9	2	0	1	3	0	0	.237	.368
Brad Snyder	10	30	3	5	1	0	2	3	0	4	.167	.400
Guilder Rodríguez	7	12	2	2	0	0	0	1	0	1	.167	.167
Pitcher totals	162	19	1	4	1	0	0	1	0	1	.211	.263
Team totals	162	5460	637	1400	260	28	111	597	105	417	.256	.375

=== Pitching ===
Note: W = Wins; L = Losses; ERA = Earned run average; G = Games pitched; GS = Games started; SV = Saves; IP = Innings pitched; H = Hits allowed; R = Runs allowed; ER = Earned runs allowed; BB = Walks allowed; SO = Strikeouts

Player	W	L	ERA	G	GS	SV	IP	H	R	ER	BB	SO
Colby Lewis	10	14	5.18	29	29	0	170.1	211	107	98	48	133
Yu Darvish	10	7	3.06	22	22	0	144.1	133	54	49	49	182
Nick Martinez	5	12	4.55	29	24	0	140.1	150	79	71	55	77
Nick Tepesch	5	11	4.36	23	22	0	126.0	128	66	61	44	56
Scott Baker	3	4	5.47	25	8	0	80.2	82	49	49	14	55
Robbie Ross Jr.	3	6	6.20	27	12	0	78.1	103	65	54	30	51
Shawn Tolleson	3	1	2.76	64	0	0	71.2	56	23	22	28	69
Neal Cotts	2	9	4.32	73	0	2	66.2	66	33	32	23	63
Miles Mikolas	2	5	6.44	10	10	0	57.1	64	43	41	18	38
Martín Pérez	4	3	4.38	8	8	0	51.1	50	25	25	19	35
Joe Saunders	0	5	6.13	8	8	0	39.2	62	32	27	20	22
Derek Holland	2	0	1.46	6	5	0	37.0	34	8	6	5	25
Joakim Soria	1	3	2.70	35	0	17	33.1	25	12	10	4	42
Román Méndez	0	1	2.18	30	0	0	33.0	20	8	8	17	22
Neftalí Feliz	2	1	1.99	30	0	13	31.2	20	7	7	11	21
Jason Frasor	1	1	3.34	38	0	0	29.2	27	14	11	14	30
Alexi Ogando	2	3	6.84	27	0	1	25.0	33	19	19	15	22
Tanner Scheppers	0	1	9.00	8	4	0	23.0	31	24	23	10	17
Aaron Poreda	2	1	5.91	26	0	0	21.1	30	14	14	7	21
Lisalverto Bonilla	3	0	3.05	5	3	0	20.2	13	8	7	12	17
Phil Klein	1	2	2.84	17	0	0	19.0	11	6	6	10	23
Matt Harrison	1	1	4.15	4	4	0	17.1	20	8	8	12	10
Alex Claudio	0	0	2.92	15	0	0	12.1	14	4	4	4	14
Nathan Adcock	0	0	4.50	7	0	0	10.0	11	5	5	5	9
Jerome Williams	1	1	9.90	2	2	0	10.0	18	11	11	3	6
Spencer Patton	1	0	0.96	9	0	0	9.1	6	1	1	2	8
Pedro Figueroa	2	1	4.00	10	0	0	9.0	10	7	4	3	3
Ben Rowen	0	0	4.15	8	0	0	8.2	10	4	4	4	7
Jon Edwards	0	0	4.32	9	0	0	8.1	13	5	4	5	9
Ryan Feierabend	0	0	6.14	6	0	0	7.1	12	5	5	2	4
Michael Kirkman	0	1	1.59	12	0	0	5.2	5	1	1	1	3
Héctor Noesí	0	0	11.81	3	0	0	5.1	11	7	7	2	4
Justin Germano	0	0	11.81	2	0	0	5.1	8	7	7	3	3
Matt West	0	0	6.75	3	0	0	4.0	6	3	3	1	3
Seth Rosin	1	0	6.75	3	0	0	4.0	6	3	3	1	3
Phil Irwin	0	1	6.75	1	1	0	4.0	6	3	3	2	2
Daniel McCutchen	0	0	7.71	1	0	0	2.1	4	3	2	2	0
J.P. Arencibia	0	0	0.00	1	0	0	1.0	1	0	0	0	0
Mitch Moreland	0	0	0.00	1	0	0	1.0	0	0	0	0	0
Chris Gimenez	0	0	0.00	1	0	0	1.0	0	0	0	0	1
Team totals	67	95	4.49	162	162	33	1426.1	1510	773	711	505	1110

== Farm system ==
Level	Team	League	Manager
AAA	Round Rock Express	Pacific Coast League	Steve Buechele
AA	Frisco RoughRiders	Texas League	Jason Wood
A	Myrtle Beach Pelicans	Carolina League	Joe Mikulik
A	Hickory Crawdads	South Atlantic League	Corey Ragsdale
A-Short Season	Spokane Indians	Northwest League	Tim Hulett
Rookie	AZL Rangers	Arizona League	Kenny Holmberg
