= Jon Edwards (baseball) =

American baseball player (born 1988)

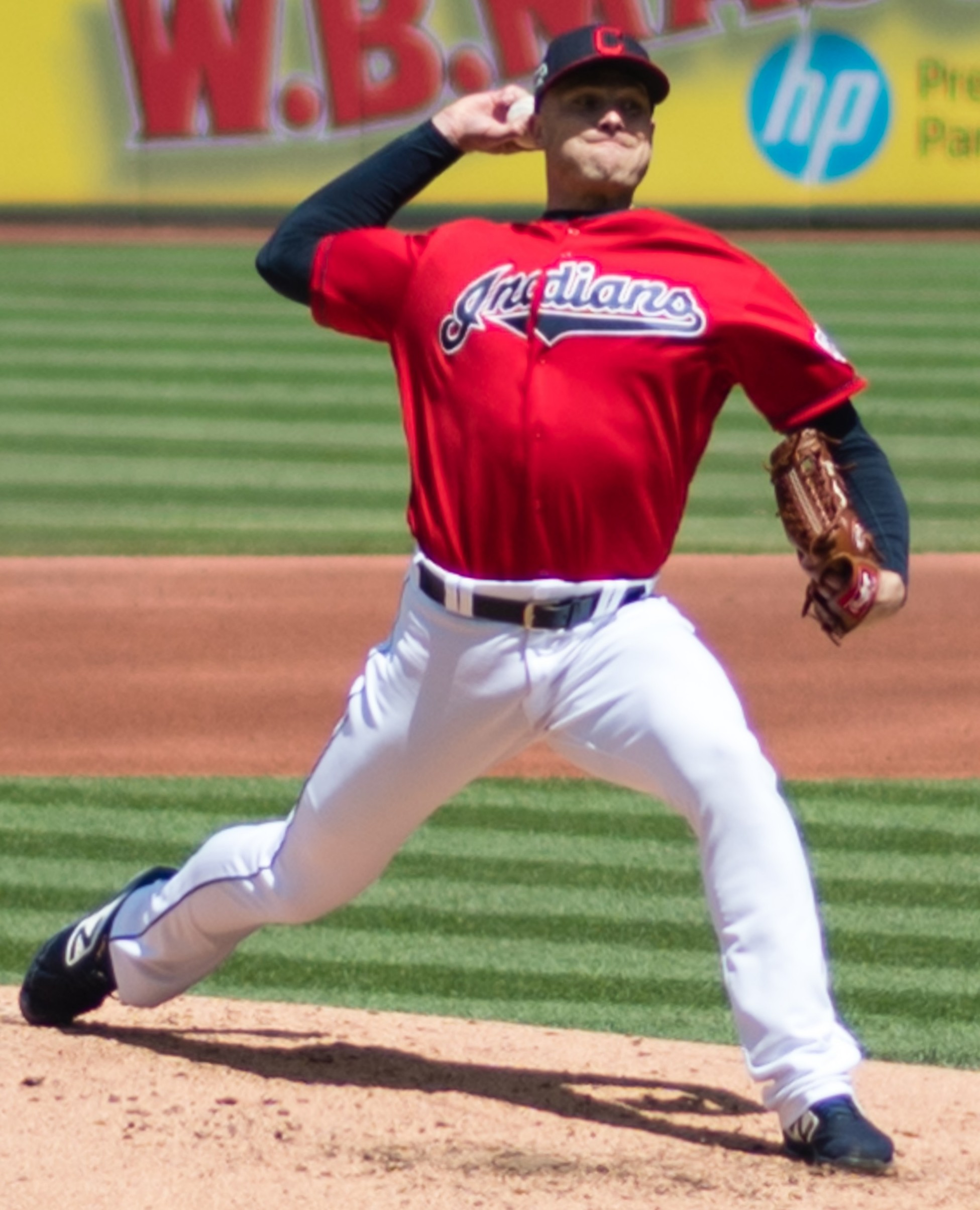
- Edwards with the Cleveland Indians in 2019
- Pitcher
- Born: January 8, 1988 (age 38); Chicago, Illinois, U.S.
- Batted: Right Threw: Right

Professional debut
- MLB: August 15, 2014, for the Texas Rangers
- NPB: June 19, 2020, for the Hanshin Tigers

Last appearance
- MLB: June 6, 2019, for the Cleveland Indians
- NPB: August 13, 2021, for the Hanshin Tigers

MLB statistics
- Win–loss record: 2–0
- Earned run average: 3.67
- Strikeouts: 46

NPB statistics
- Win–loss record: 0-1
- Earned run average: 2.43
- Strikeouts: 24
- Stats at Baseball Reference

Teams
- Texas Rangers (2014–2015); San Diego Padres (2015); Cleveland Indians (2018–2019); Hanshin Tigers (2020–2021)

Jonathan Benjamin Edwards (born January 8, 1988) is an American former professional baseball pitcher. He played in Major League Baseball (MLB) for the Texas Rangers, San Diego Padres, and Cleveland Indians. He also played in Nippon Professional Baseball (NPB) for the Hanshin Tigers.

== Career ==
Edwards attended Keller High School in Keller, Texas.

=== St. Louis Cardinals ===
The St. Louis Cardinals selected Edwards in the 14th round of the 2006 Major League Baseball draft as an outfielder. He made his professional debut with the rookie-level Johnson City Cardinals. Edwards split the 2007 campaign between Johnson City and the Low-A Batavia Muckdogs, batting a cumulative .267/.357/.457 with eight home runs and 40 RBI.

Edwards split the 2008 season between Batavia and the Single-A Quad Cities River Bandits, slashing .289/.390/.517 with 10 home runs and 29 RBI across 53 total appearances. He returned to the two affiliates in 2009, hitting a combined .205/.271/.365 with 13 home runs and 45 RBI.

Edwards spent the 2010 season with Low-A Batavia, playing in 43 games and hitting .180/.281/.295 with two home runs and 11 RBI. He was released by the Cardinals organization on October 8, 2010, without appearing in an MLB game for St. Louis.

=== San Angelo Colts / Alpine Cowboys ===
Edwards spent the 2011 season playing independent league baseball for the San Angelo Colts of the United Baseball League and Alpine Cowboys of the Pecos League. He would be the first player from the Pecos League to ever play in MLB. In 25 appearances for the two teams, Edwards batted .227/.348/.467 with five home runs and 15 RBI.

=== Texas Rangers ===
On December 20, 2011, Edwards signed a minor league contract with the Texas Rangers and converted into a pitcher. He split the 2012 season between the rookie–level Arizona League Rangers, Low–A Spokane Indians, High–A Myrtle Beach Pelicans, and Double–A Frisco RoughRiders, recording a 1.80 ERA across 19 appearances.

Edwards made 35 appearances out of the bullpen for Myrtle Beach and Frisco during the 2013 campaign, posting a cumulative 3–2 record and 4.04 ERA with 67 strikeouts and four saves across 55 2/3 innings pitched.

Edwards began the 2014 season with the Triple–A Round Rock Express, pitching to a 1.42 ERA with 44 strikeouts and 20 saves spanning 32 appearances. On August 15, 2014, Edwards was selected to the 40–man roster and promoted to the major leagues for the first time. He made nine appearances for the Rangers during his rookie campaign, recording a 4.32 ERA with nine strikeouts across 8 1/3 innings pitched.

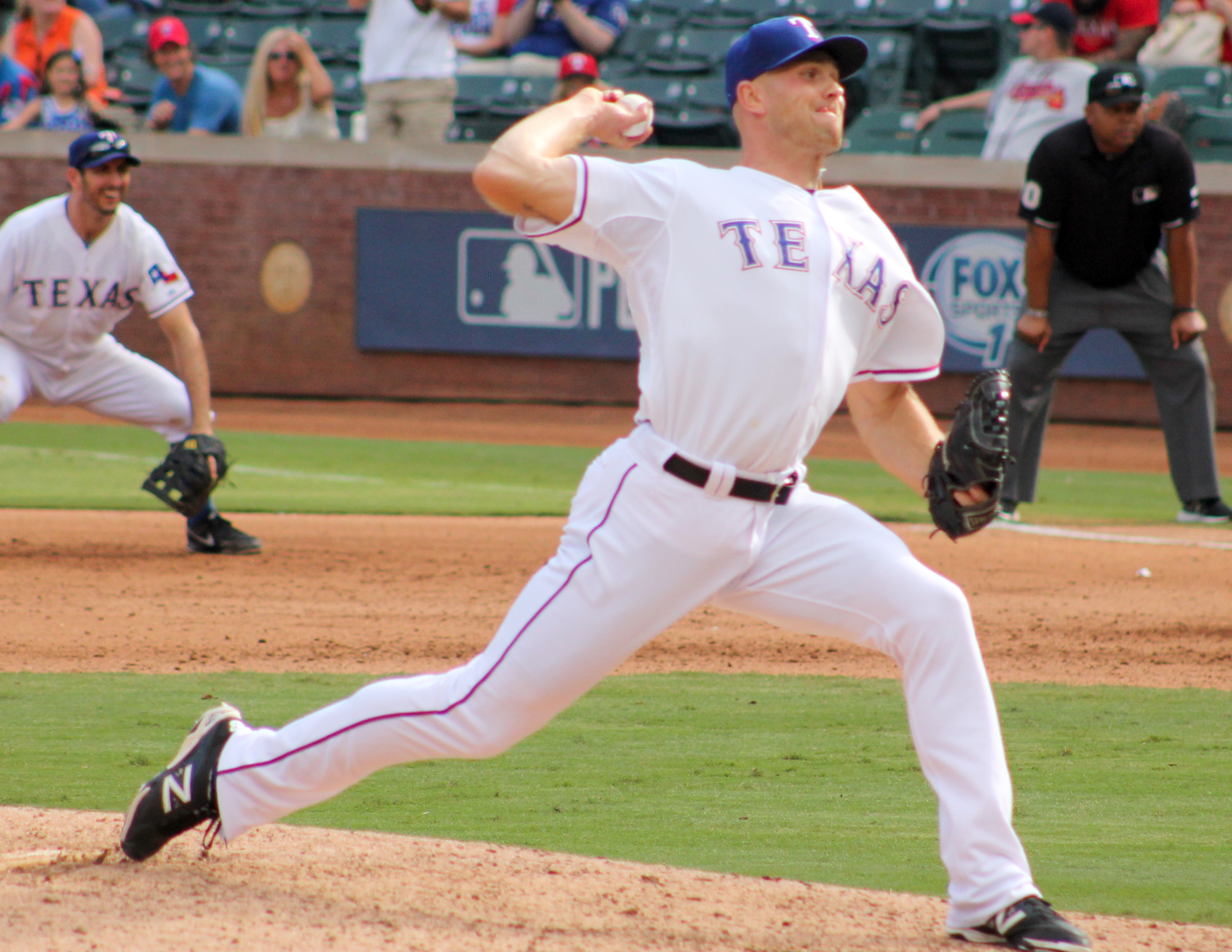
Edwards pitching for the Texas Rangers in 2014

Edwards made 11 appearances for Texas during the 2015 season, logging a 6.00 ERA with six strikeouts across six innings pitched.

=== San Diego Padres ===
On August 20, 2015, Edwards was traded from the Rangers to the San Diego Padres in exchange for Will Venable. He made 11 appearances for San Diego, recording a 3.38 ERA with 16 strikeouts across 10 2/3 innings pitched.

On June 2, 2016, Edwards underwent Tommy John surgery, ruling him out for the season. On December 20, Edwards re-signed with San Diego on a minor league contract. He was released prior to the start of the season on March 28, 2017.

=== Cleveland Indians ===
On March 22, 2018, Edwards signed a minor league contract with the Cleveland Indians. The Indians promoted Edwards to the major leagues on September 1. In nine appearances, he recorded a 3.12 ERA with 10 strikeouts over 8 2/3 innings.

On March 30, 2019, Edwards earned his first career win, recording 2/3 of a scoreless inning against the Minnesota Twins. Edwards pitched in nine games for Cleveland in the regular season, posting a 2–0 record and 2.25 ERA with five strikeouts across eight innings pitched. On September 1, Edwards was designated for assignment by the Indians. After clearing waivers, he was sent outright to the Triple-A Columbus Clippers on September 3. Edwards elected free agency following the season on November 4.

=== Hanshin Tigers ===
On December 21, 2019, Edwards signed with the Hanshin Tigers of Nippon Professional Baseball (NPB). He made 23 appearances for Hanshin in 2020, posting an 0–1 record and 2.38 ERA with 17 strikeouts across 22 2/3 innings pitched.

Edwards pitched in seven contests for the Tigers during the 2021 season, recording a 2.57 ERA with seven strikeouts over seven innings of work.
