= Nate Schierholtz =

American baseball player (born 1984)

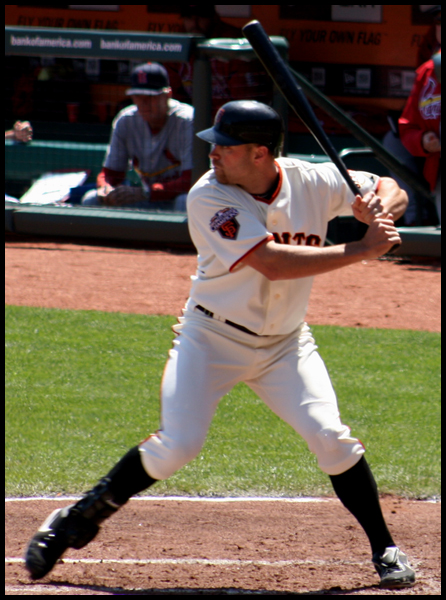
- Schierholtz with the San Francisco Giants
- Right fielder
- Born: February 15, 1984 (age 42); Reno, Nevada, U.S.
- Batted: Left Threw: Right

Professional debut
- MLB: June 11, 2007, for the San Francisco Giants
- NPB: April 19, 2015, for the Hiroshima Toyo Carp

Last appearance
- MLB: October 7, 2014, for the Washington Nationals
- NPB: September 12, 2015, for the Hiroshima Toyo Carp

MLB statistics
- Batting average: .253
- Home runs: 52
- Runs batted in: 228

NPB statistics
- Batting average: .250
- Home runs: 10
- Runs batted in: 30
- Stats at Baseball Reference

Teams
- San Francisco Giants (2007–2012); Philadelphia Phillies (2012); Chicago Cubs (2013–2014); Washington Nationals (2014); Hiroshima Toyo Carp (2015)

Career highlights and awards
- World Series champion (2010)
Medals
Men's baseball
Representing United States
Olympic Games
Bronze medal – third place	2008 Beijing	Team

Nathan John Schierholtz (born February 15, 1984) is an American former professional baseball right fielder. He played in Major League Baseball (MLB) for the San Francisco Giants (2007–2012), Philadelphia Phillies (2012), Chicago Cubs (2013–2014), and Washington Nationals (2014). He also played in Nippon Professional Baseball (NPB) for Hiroshima Toyo Carp (2015). He won a bronze medal with the U.S. national baseball team at the 2008 Summer Olympics.

== Early life ==
Schierholtz was born February 15, 1984, in Reno, Nevada. His parents were Vai Sr., and Karen Schierholtz, and he was the oldest of four children (Cainan; Vai Jr.; and Sophia). He attended San Ramon Valley High School in Danville, California, the same high school as future San Francisco Giants teammate Randy Winn. At San Ramon Valley, he served as the team captain.

== College career ==
Following high school, Schierholtz played for Chabot College, a community college located in Hayward, California. He spent the 2003 season with Chabot, starting at third base. In his lone season at Chabot, he was named an All-American.

== Professional career ==
=== Draft and minor leagues ===
Schierholtz was drafted by the San Francisco Giants in the second round (63rd overall) of the 2003 Major League Baseball (MLB) Draft. He began his minor league career that year as a third baseman with the rookie Arizona League Giants, batting .400 in 11 games before getting promoted to the Single-A short season Salem-Keizer Volcanoes of the Northwest League. In 35 games for Salem-Keizer, he hit .306 with 38 hits, three home runs, and 29 runs batted in (RBI). He began the 2004 season with the Single-A Hagerstown Suns of the South Atlantic League, earning All-star game honors for that league. He batted .296 with 53 RBI in 58 games and was leading the league in home runs (15) and extra-base hits (37) before getting promoted to the Single-A advanced San Jose Giants of the California League. At San Jose, though still receiving significant playing time as a third baseman, he began to play the outfield as well. In 62 games with San Jose, he batted .295 with three home runs and 31 RBI. He was second on the team with nine triples after not hitting any with Hagerstown. He was third among Giants' prospects with 18 home runs and ranked second with 84 RBI in 2004.

In 2005, Schierholtz remained at San Jose, where he became an everyday right fielder. Over 128 games, he batted .319 (fifth in the California League) with 160 hits (tied with Chris Lubanski, Seth Smith, and Clay Timpner for fifth), 37 doubles (tied with Danny Putnam for eighth), eight triples (tied with Wladimir Balentien, Danny Richar, and Joe Gaetti for third behind Timpner's 12 and Anthony Webster's 11), 15 home runs, and 86 RBI. He batted .333 in the playoffs, helping San Jose win the California League championship.

Schierholtz moved up to the Double-A Connecticut Defenders of the Eastern League in 2006. In 125 games, he batted .270 with 127 hits, 14 home runs, and 54 RBI. He led the Defenders in most major batting categories and finished sixth in the Eastern League with seven triples. Entering the 2007 season, Schierholtz was ranked the eighth-best prospect in the Giants' organization by Baseball America. That year, he was assigned to the Triple-A Fresno Grizzlies of the Pacific Coast League. He spent most of the season with them. In 109 games, he had 137 hits, 31 doubles, 16 home runs, and 68 RBI. He finished third in the league in batting average (.333, behind Geovany Soto's .353 and Delwyn Young's .337) and triples (seven, tied with Scott Seabol behind Reggie Abercrombie's and Jeff Salazar's nine).

Giants' manager Bruce Bochy considered calling up Schierholtz in May 2007 when Dave Roberts started suffering elbow problems, but an injury to Schierholtz prevented that.

=== San Francisco Giants (2007–2012) ===
==== 2007 ====
On June 11, Schierholtz was called up to replace Dan Ortmeier and try to give the Giants some offensive help. He made his major league debut that day, against the Toronto Blue Jays as a defensive replacement. He got his first hit the next night, against A. J. Burnett in his first career at bat in a 3–2 victory over Toronto. During this stint, Schierholtz received most of the starts in right field. On June 23, at AT&T Park against the New York Yankees, he blooped an RBI single into center field against Scott Proctor in the bottom of the 13th inning to win the game 6–5 for the Giants. Despite a .325 batting average in 40 at bats, Schierholtz was sent down at the start of July to make room for Rich Aurilia, who was returning from the disabled list. He was recalled in September, and he received most of the starts in right field that month. In 39 games (112 at bats), he batted .304 with 34 hits, five doubles, three triples, 10 RBI, and two walks.

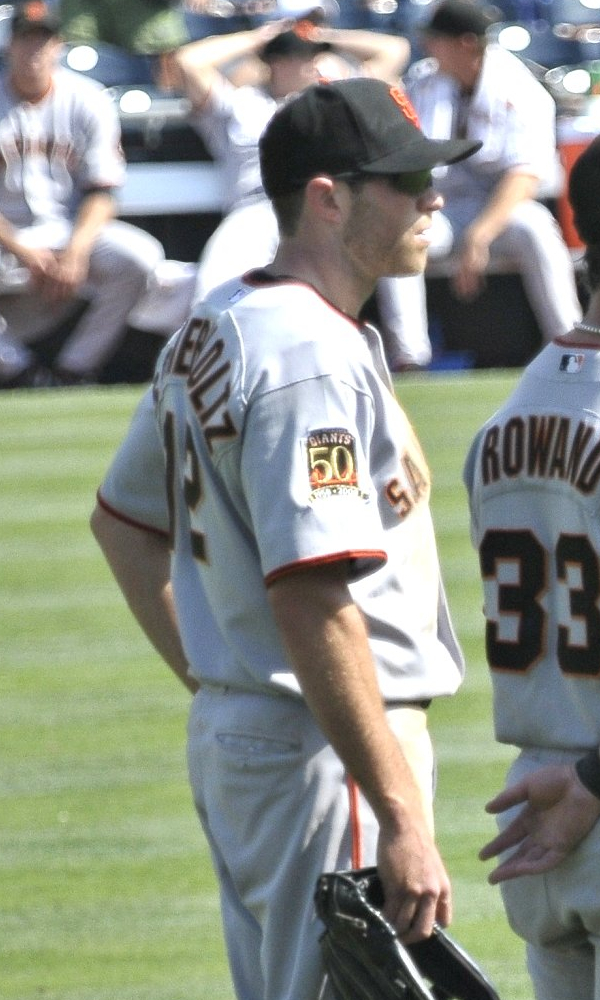
Schierholtz in 2008

In 2008, Baseball America ranked Schierholtz the fourth-best prospect in the Giants' system. He attended spring training with the Giants but started the season in Fresno. Schierholtz was batting .314 with fifteen home runs and 65 runs batted in for the Grizzlies when his minor league season ended as a result of his being selected for the 2008 USA Olympic Baseball Team. In the sixth inning of a preliminary round game against China, he collided with China backup catcher Yang Yang at the home plate on a sacrifice fly, a play that resulted in a near brawl between the teams and saw Chinese manager Jim Lefebvre ejected from the game. Schierholtz played nine games with the Americans, batting .216 with four doubles, one home run, and six RBI as the United States earned a bronze medal.

Schierholtz was again called up in September 2008, as the Giants' roster expanded, and he was used as the Giants' starting right fielder for the remainder of the year. On September 3, he recorded four hits in a game for the first time in a 9–2 victory over the Colorado Rockies. Three days later, he hit his first career home run against Jesse Chavez in a 7–6 victory over the Pittsburgh Pirates. In 19 games (75 at bats) in 2008, Schierholtz hit .320 with 24 hits, eight doubles, one triple, one home run, and five RBI.

==== 2009 ====
Schierholtz started the 2009 season as a pinch hitter. In June, he saw his playing time increase as Randy Winn, the Giants' right fielder, began playing left field frequently in place of Fred Lewis. On June 14, he had an inside-the-park home run, only the fourth in AT&T Park history, in the third inning against Brett Anderson of the Oakland Athletics in a 7–1 victory. He had four hits on June 28 in a 7–0 win over the Milwaukee Brewers. From July 28 through August 12, he was on the disabled list with a bruised left hip, which he suffered after running into a chain-link fence at Turner Field. He saw his playing time reduced in September as Winn moved back to right field to give Eugenio Vélez and John Bowker opportunities in left. In a career-high 116 games (285 at bats) in 2009, Schierholtz batted .267 with 76 hits, five home runs, and 29 RBI. He had the third-highest batting average for a pinch hitter in the majors (.371, behind Seth Smith's .472 and Hideki Matsui's .381).

==== 2010 ====
Schierholtz was expected to be the Giants' Opening Day right fielder in 2010, but Bowker won the position after hitting six home runs in spring training. Bowker, however, only held the job for 10 games before Schierholtz replaced him on April 17. In his first 16 games in the role, he batted .393, but over his next 19, he batted .154. When Buster Posey was called up in late May, Aubrey Huff moved from first base to right field, leaving Schierholtz on the bench. After Bengie Molina was traded, Posey switched from first base to catcher, but Travis Ishikawa began getting some starts at first base, creating a platoon between Schierholtz and Ishikawa, with Huff covering first base or right field depending on who was playing. When José Guillén was acquired on August 13, Schierholtz was relegated to the role of pinch-hitter and late-inning defensive substitution for the rest of the year. In 137 games (227 at bats), Schierholtz batted .242 with 55 hits, 13 doubles, three triples, three home runs, and 17 RBI.

Schierholtz received regular playing time throughout the postseason as a defensive replacement for starting outfielder Pat Burrell. Whenever the Giants held a lead in the sixth inning or later, Bochy would remove Burrell from the game, shift Cody Ross from right field to left field, and place Schierholtz in right field. This strategy was meant to provide the Giants with the best possible defensive outfield and, thus, the best chance of holding the lead and winning the game. Schierholtz ultimately appeared in 11 of San Francisco's 15 playoff games, accumulating 13 plate appearances and recording an RBI in Game 1 of the 2010 World Series against the Texas Rangers. In Game 4, a night when Bochy chose to start several of his backups, he got his first start of the postseason, playing right field in the Giants' 4–0 victory. The Giants won the World Series in five games, their first World Series victory since 1954.

==== 2011 ====
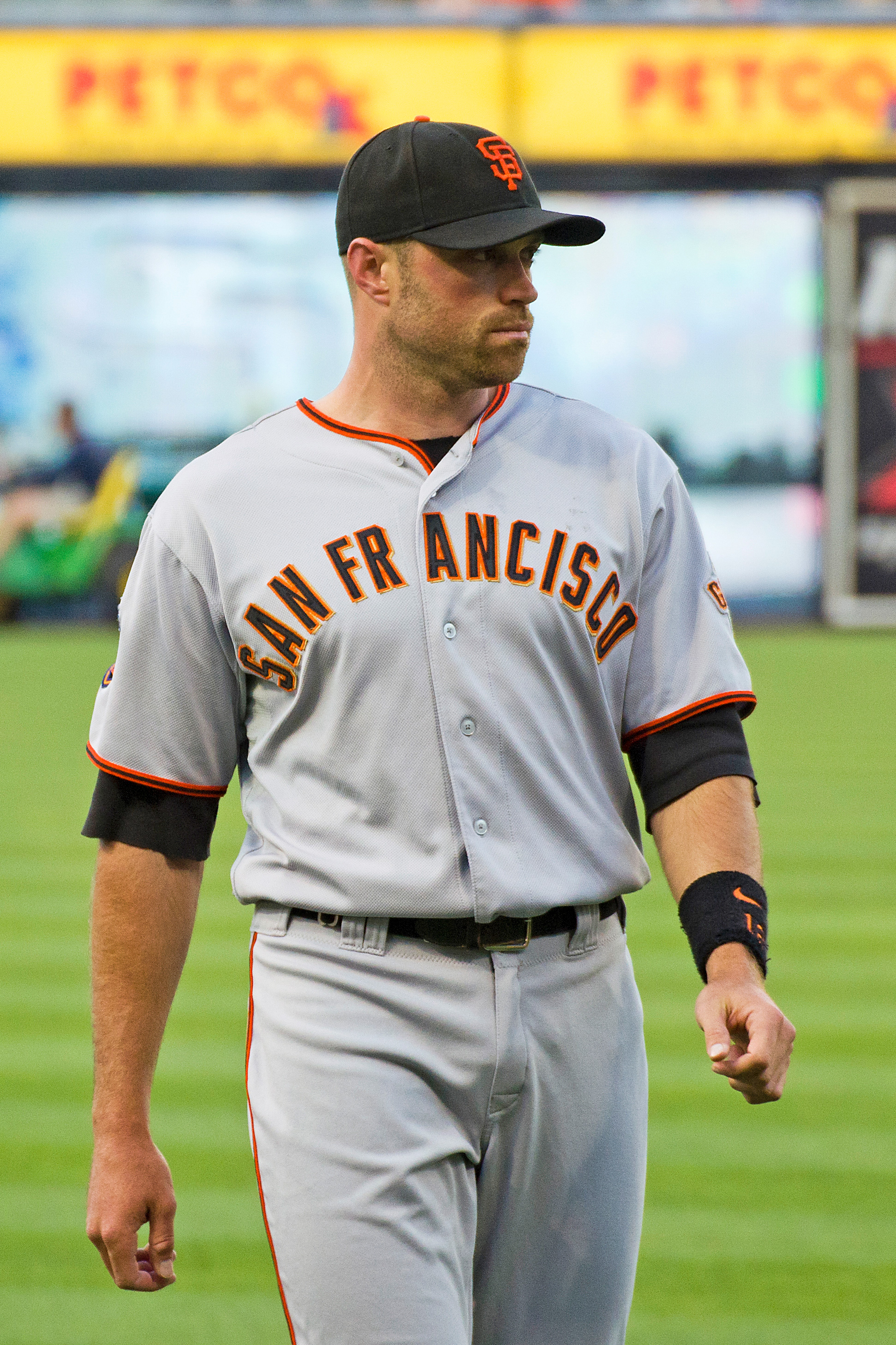
Schierholtz in 2011

Schierholtz hit a 467-foot home run at Coors Field on April 18, 2011, against Esmil Rogers in an 8–1 victory over the Rockies. At the start of May, Schierholtz took over the Giants' right field job, due to a slump by Burrell. He hit a game-tying, two-run pinch-hit home run against Grant Balfour on May 22 in an 11-inning, 5–4 victory over Oakland. Ten days later, he had a game-tying RBI single in the ninth inning against Fernando Salas and a game-winning RBI single in the 11th inning against Ryan Franklin in a 7–5 victory over the St. Louis Cardinals. On July 6, against the San Diego Padres, Schierholtz recorded his first multi-home run game. In the bottom of the 14th inning of that game, he hit a walk-off home run against Pat Neshek that secured a 6–5 victory for the Giants. Two days later, he had a splash hit home run against R. A. Dickey in a 5–2 loss to the New York Mets. Following the acquisition of Carlos Beltrán on July 28, Schierholtz began playing some left field for the first time in his career. He broke his right foot after hitting a foul ball off it against the Atlanta Braves on August 15. Schierholtz appeared in five more games after the injury, but it became too severe to play through, and he was placed on the disabled list on August 27 (retroactive to August 22), and, though initially expected to return, he missed the rest of the season. In 115 games (335 at bats), Schierholtz hit .278 with 93 hits, 22 doubles, nine home runs, and 41 RBI. He said of his 2011 season, "I was able to contribute to the team this year. That was a positive thing I can take from the season."

==== 2012 ====
In 2012, Schierholtz started the season as a bench player but soon became the Giants' everyday right fielder. On April 23 and 24, he had back-to-back three-hit games against the Mets. He batted .372 over his first 14 games but hit just .048 over his next seven. When May started, Bochy benched him in favor of Gregor Blanco. On July 18, in an interview with Henry Schulman of the San Francisco Chronicle, he said that Bochy had told him in May that he did not view him as an everyday player. He said that, while he did not ask for a trade, "I think whatever the best fit for the team and me is would be ideal. I can't really make those decisions. It's all up to them. Whether I'm here or not I'm going to give my best effort every day and bust my tail." That weekend, he started three games against the Philadelphia Phillies in right field, partly because Blanco and Ángel Pagán had been struggling. On July 22, Schierholtz hit two home runs against Joe Blanton, the second of which forced the game into extra innings. However, the Giants would lose 4–3 in 12 innings. In 77 games (175 at bats), Schierholtz hit .251 with 44 hits, four doubles, five triples, five home runs, and 16 RBI.

=== Philadelphia Phillies (2012) ===
At the trade deadline on July 31, Schierholtz was traded to the Philadelphia Phillies along with minor league catcher Tommy Joseph and minor league pitcher Seth Rosin for outfielder Hunter Pence. Upon Schierholtz's arrival in Philadelphia, manager Charlie Manuel said he wanted to give Schierholtz everyday playing time for the rest of the year, in order to assess him. In the transition, Schierholtz changed his number from 12 to 22. In his debut, Schierholtz homered against Edwin Jackson in a 3–2 victory against the Washington Nationals. However, Schierholtz was sent to the disabled list on August 13 after fouling a ball off his right big toe in a game against the Cardinals. He remained on the disabled list until September 1. On September 7, he delivered a game-ending RBI single against Will Harris, giving the Phillies a 3–2 win over Colorado. Schierholtz appeared in 33 games with the Phillies, batting .273 with 18 hits, four doubles, one home run, and five RBI. In 114 games (241 at bats) with Philadelphia and San Francisco, he batted .257 with 62 hits, eight doubles, five triples, six home runs, and 21 RBI. After the season, the Phillies non-tendered Schierholtz, making him a free agent. They chose to non-tender him because they were only projecting him as a fifth outfielder, and Schierholtz was due for a pay raise.

Despite being traded to the Phillies, Schierholtz received his second World Series ring from the Giants due to his contributions during the first half of the 2012 season with the team.

=== Chicago Cubs (2013–2014) ===
On December 5, 2012, Schierholtz signed a $2.25 million, one-year deal with the Chicago Cubs. He was the Cubs' starting right fielder for most of the 2013 season. From June 4 through 18, he set a career-high with a 10-game hitting streak. On June 14, he had two triples in a game for the first time in his career in a 14-inning, 6–5 victory over the Cincinnati Reds. On June 22, he set a career-high with his 10th home run of the season in a 4–3 loss to the Houston Astros. He batted .286 with 11 home runs through June 30 but saw his average sink to .218 for the rest of the season, although he would hit 10 home runs. On July 24, he had a career-high five RBI, including a game-winning RBI double against David Hernandez in the 12th inning of a 7–6 victory over the Arizona Diamondbacks. Three days later, he hit a home run against Sergio Romo in a 1–0 victory over the Giants. Schierholtz reset his career-high in RBI with six on August 19, including home runs against Jordan Zimmermann and Fernando Abad in an 11–1 victory over the Washington Nationals. In 137 games (462 at bats), Schierholtz batted .251 with career-highs in hits (116), doubles (32), home runs (21), runs scored (56), and RBI (68). Defensively, he posted a .988 fielding percentage.

On January 17, 2014, Schierholtz signed a $5 million, one-year deal to remain with the Chicago Cubs. On June 3, he had a game-ending RBI single against Scott Rice, giving the Cubs a 2–1 victory over the Mets. He was designated for assignment by the Cubs on August 6, 2014. Chicago released the veteran on waivers after he had a .192 batting average and six home runs over 99 games.

=== Washington Nationals (2014) ===
On August 18, 2014, Schierholtz signed a minor league deal with the Washington Nationals, and was assigned to the Triple-A Syracuse Chiefs of the International League. The Nationals selected Schierholtz's contract on August 23 and used him as a reserve outfielder. On September 21, he tripled home a run against Nate Eovaldi, then scored on a double by Anthony Rendon in a 2–1 victory over the Miami Marlins. In 23 games (40 at bats) with the Nationals, Schierholtz batted .225 with one home run. His combined totals were a .195 average, 69 hits, seven home runs, and 37 RBI in 122 games with Chicago and Washington. Schierholtz reached the playoffs with Washington as they won the National League East. He appeared in all four games of the 2014 National League Division Series, getting a hit and three walks in four plate appearances for a 1.000 on-base percentage as the Nationals were defeated by the Giants. After the season, he became a free agent.

=== Texas Rangers ===
On February 6, 2015, Schierholtz signed a minor league deal with the Texas Rangers. He competed for an outfield spot but was released on March 28 before the season started.

=== Hiroshima Toyo Carp (2015) ===
After his release from Texas, Schierholtz went to Japan, signing a one-year deal with the Hiroshima Toyo Carp of Nippon Professional Baseball (NPB). During the 2015 season, he hit .250 (58-for-232), with 10 home runs and 30 RBIs in 65 games. "It was definitely an interesting experience and I learned a lot. I enjoyed living with the Japanese culture and learning some of their ways and values. The fans are very kind to the American foreign players and it was a great experience," Schierholtz summarized his time in Japan.

=== Detroit Tigers ===
On December 23, 2015, Schierholtz signed a minor league contract with the Detroit Tigers, and was invited to 2016 spring training. Failing to make the club, he played 31 games for the Triple-A Toledo Mud Hens of the International League, batting .246 with 29 hits, three home runs, and 13 RBI before his release on May 22. On August 5, 2016, Schierholtz received an 80-game suspension from Major League Baseball for testing positive for a performance-enhancing drug.

== Personal life ==
Schierholtz married Kate Eveland, a former guard on the San Diego State basketball team on December 3, 2011. Vai Jr., his youngest brother, attended the Air Force Academy and played baseball for the Falcons. His mother lives in Alamo, California; her house burned down in 2009 but was rebuilt.

Schierholtz used to bat without batting gloves, one of the few Major Leaguers to do so, but since 2011 has used batting gloves.
