= Michael Choice =

American baseball player (born 1989)

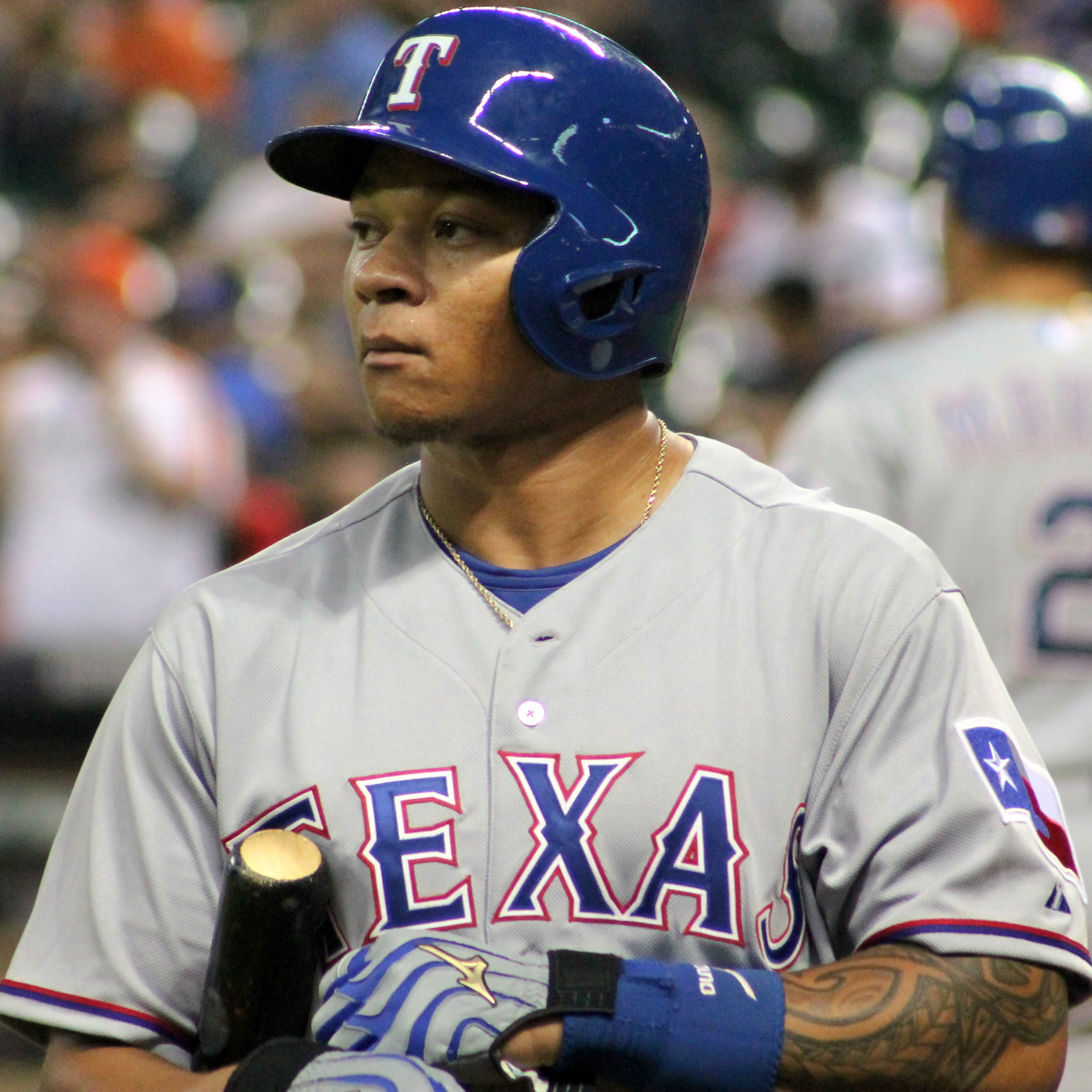
- Choice with the Texas Rangers in 2014
- Outfielder
- Born: November 10, 1989 (age 37); Fort Worth, Texas, U.S.
- Batted: Right Threw: Right

Professional debut
- MLB: September 2, 2013, for the Oakland Athletics
- KBO: July 29, 2017, for the Nexen Heroes

Last appearance
- MLB: June 24, 2015, for the Texas Rangers
- KBO: August 5, 2018, for the Nexen Heroes

MLB statistics
- Batting average: .188
- Home runs: 9
- Runs batted in: 36

KBO statistics
- Batting average: .282
- Home runs: 28
- Runs batted in: 78
- Stats at Baseball Reference

Teams
- Oakland Athletics (2013); Texas Rangers (2014–2015); Nexen Heroes (2017–2018)

Michael Blair Choice (born November 10, 1989) is an American former professional baseball outfielder. Choice played in Major League Baseball (MLB) for the Oakland Athletics and Texas Rangers, and in the KBO League for the Nexen Heroes.

Choice played college baseball at the University of Texas at Arlington before the Athletics made him their first round draft pick in 2010. He made his MLB debut with the Athletics in 2013, and played for the Rangers in 2014 and 2015.

== Amateur career ==
Choice attended Mansfield Timberview High School in Arlington, Texas. He played for the school's baseball team as a catcher and pitcher. He had a .506 batting average during his senior year.

Though universities in the Big 12 Conference scouted Choice, he received his only scholarship offer from the University of Texas at Arlington (UTA), where he played college baseball for the Texas–Arlington Mavericks baseball team of the Southland Conference. Due to the number of catchers and middle infielders on the team, Choice played as a center fielder. As a freshman in 2008, Choice led the team in with a .376 batting average, seven home runs, and 51 runs batted in (RBIs). That year, Choice was named Second Team College Freshman All-American Outfielder and Southland Conference Freshman of the Year. In 2009, he was named Southland Conference All-Star Outfielder. In the summer of 2009, he played for the United States national baseball team in the World Baseball Challenge.

As a junior in 2010, Choice hit .393 with 16 home runs, a .568 on-base percentage, and a .704 slugging percentage. He was named First Team College All-American Outfielder, Southland Conference All-Star Outfielder, and Southland Conference Player of the Year. He was also named a semifinalist for the Golden Spikes Award, which is given to the best amateur baseball player of the year. In his three years at UTA, Choice batted .392 and hit a school-record 34 home runs.

== Professional career ==
=== Oakland Athletics ===
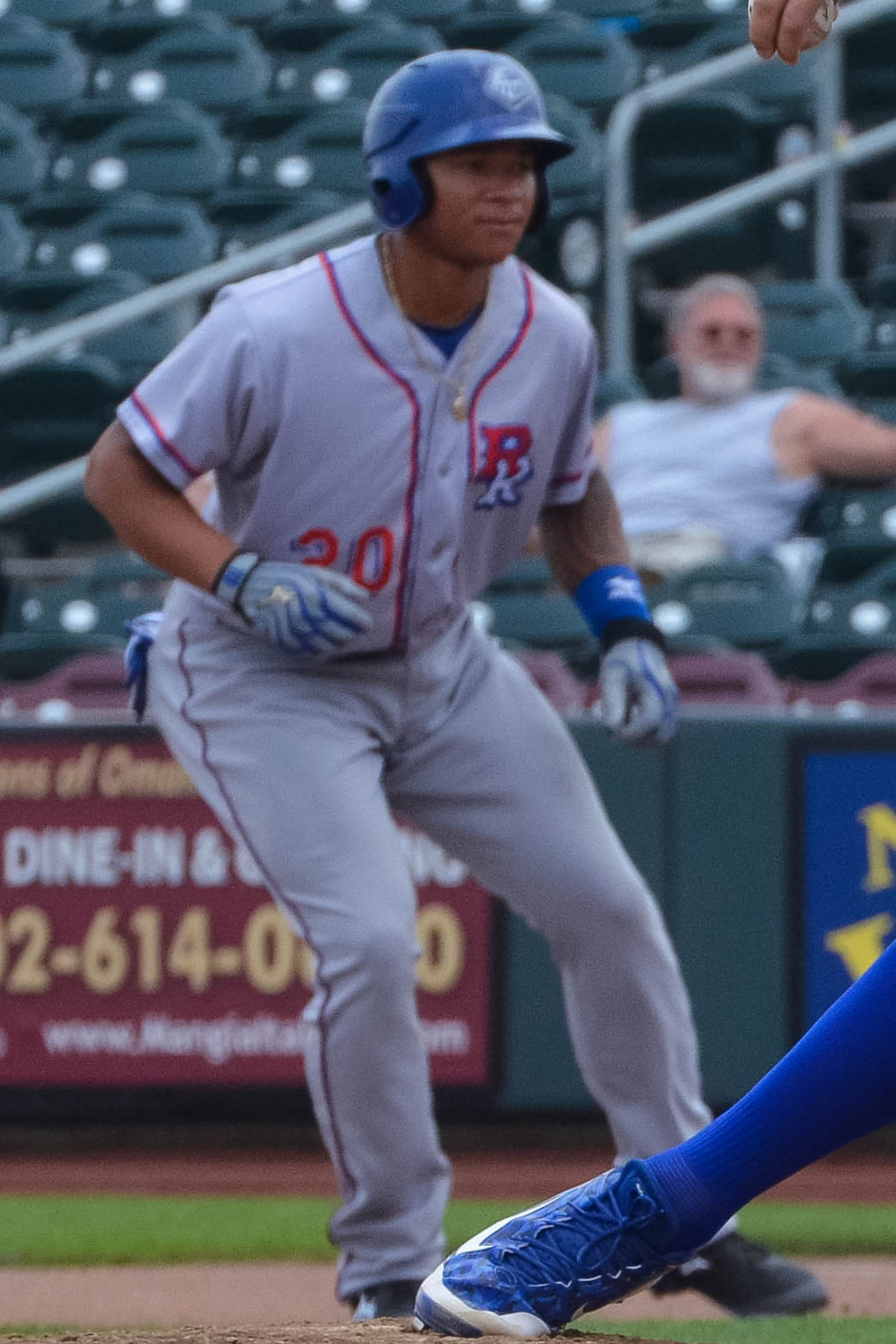
Choice playing for the Round Rock Express in 2015

The Oakland Athletics selected Choice with their first round pick, tenth overall, in the 2010 Major League Baseball draft. Choice was the first UTA player to be drafted in the first round, and the highest selection in Southland Conference history, tying Ben Sheets of Louisiana-Monroe, who was selected tenth overall in 1999.

Choice signed with the Athletics on July 30 for a $2 million signing bonus. That season, he played for the Arizona League Athletics of the Rookie-level Arizona League and Vancouver Canadians of the Single–A Northwest League. In 2011, he played for the Stockton Ports of the High–A California League, where he batted .283 with 30 home runs, along with 82 RBIs. Playing center field for the Midland RockHounds of the Double–A Texas League, he batted .264 with six home runs and 43 RBI in the first 69 games of the season, as he was named to appear in the 2012 All-Star Futures Game. His season ended prematurely due to a broken hand suffered when he was hit by a pitch in July.

Choice spent the 2013 season with the Sacramento River Cats of the Triple–A Pacific Coast League (PCL), where he batted .302 with 14 home runs and 89 RBI in 132 games. The Athletics selected his contract on September 1, 2013. He made his major league debut the following day.

=== Texas Rangers ===
On December 3, 2013, the Athletics traded Choice and infielder Chris Bostick to the Texas Rangers for outfielder Craig Gentry and pitcher Josh Lindblom. Choice made the Rangers' Opening Day roster. He hit his first career home run against the Houston Astros off of Kevin Chapman, becoming the first Rangers' player to hit his first career home run in a pitch-hit at-bat. Struggling with a .177 batting average, the Rangers demoted Choice to the Round Rock Express of the PCL in July. The Rangers promoted Choice back to the major leagues in August. His season ended when he strained his hamstring in September; he batted .182 for the Rangers.

Choice competed in spring training to become the Rangers' starting left fielder, but he struggled and was reassigned to minor league camp during the competition. Choice spent the 2015 season with Round Rock, and was designated for assignment on August 18.

=== Cleveland Indians ===
The Rangers traded Choice to the Cleveland Indians in exchange for cash considerations on August 21, 2015, and the Indians subsequently optioned him to the Columbus Clippers of the Triple–A International League. Choice finished the 2015 season with Columbus, and was designated for assignment on November 25. He cleared waivers and was sent outright to Columbus on November 30.

Choice was invited to 2016 spring training as a non–roster player. He spent the year with Columbus, playing in 71 games and batting .246/.304/.456 with 14 home runs and 39 RBI. Choice elected free agency following the season on November 7, 2016.

=== Baltimore Orioles ===
On February 15, 2017, Choice signed a minor league contract with the Baltimore Orioles. He played in 11 games for the Triple–A Norfolk Tides, going 1–for–26 (.039) with two RBI. Choice was released by the Orioles organization on May 2.

=== Milwaukee Brewers ===
On May 5, 2017, Choice signed a minor league deal with the Milwaukee Brewers. He played for the Biloxi Shuckers of the Double–A Southern League.

=== Nexen Heroes ===
On July 22, 2017, the Brewers sold Choice's contract to the Nexen Heroes of the KBO League. Choice re-signed with the Heroes for $600,000 on November 24, 2017. Choice batted .307 with 17 home runs in 46 games for Nexen, and was re–signed for the 2018 season. He batted .258 with 17 home runs in 96 games, and Nexen released Choice on August 7, 2018.

=== Diablos Rojos del México ===
On August 16, 2018, Choice signed with the Diablos Rojos del México of the Mexican League. He became a free agent following the season.

=== Tigres de Quintana Roo ===
On April 19, 2019, Choice signed with the Tigres de Quintana Roo of the Mexican League. He was released on May 31, 2019.

=== Algodoneros de Unión Laguna ===
On June 29, 2019, Choice signed with the Algodoneros de Unión Laguna of the Mexican League.

=== Colorado Rockies ===
On December 17, 2019, Choice signed a minor league deal with the Colorado Rockies. Choice was released by the Rockies organization on May 30, 2020.

=== Algodoneros de Unión Laguna (second stint) ===
On April 8, 2021, Choice signed with the Algodoneros de Unión Laguna of the Mexican League. Choice hit .281/.369/.456 with 5 RBI in 16 games, but was released on June 10.

=== Acereros de Monclova ===
On June 18, 2021, Choice signed with the Acereros de Monclova of the Mexican League. In 3 games, he went 1 for 12 with no home runs or RBI. On June 23, he was placed on the inactive list, and he was later released on August 8.

=== Lexington Legends ===
On August 9, 2021, Choice signed with the Lexington Legends of the Atlantic League of Professional Baseball. In 36 games, he slashed .328/.420/.518 with 1 home run and 6 RBI before he was released on September 17.

== Coaching career ==
On September 28, 2023, Choice was announced as part of MLB's diversity pipeline scout and coaching development program.

== Personal ==
Choice was born in Fort Worth, Texas. His father, Charles, worked as an engineer for Bell Helicopter, and his mother, Charea, worked as a schoolteacher.

Choice married his girlfriend, Jade, in October 2012. The couple divorced July, 2022. They have two children. He remarried Belinda, in November 2023.
