= Román Méndez =

Dominican baseball player (born 1990)

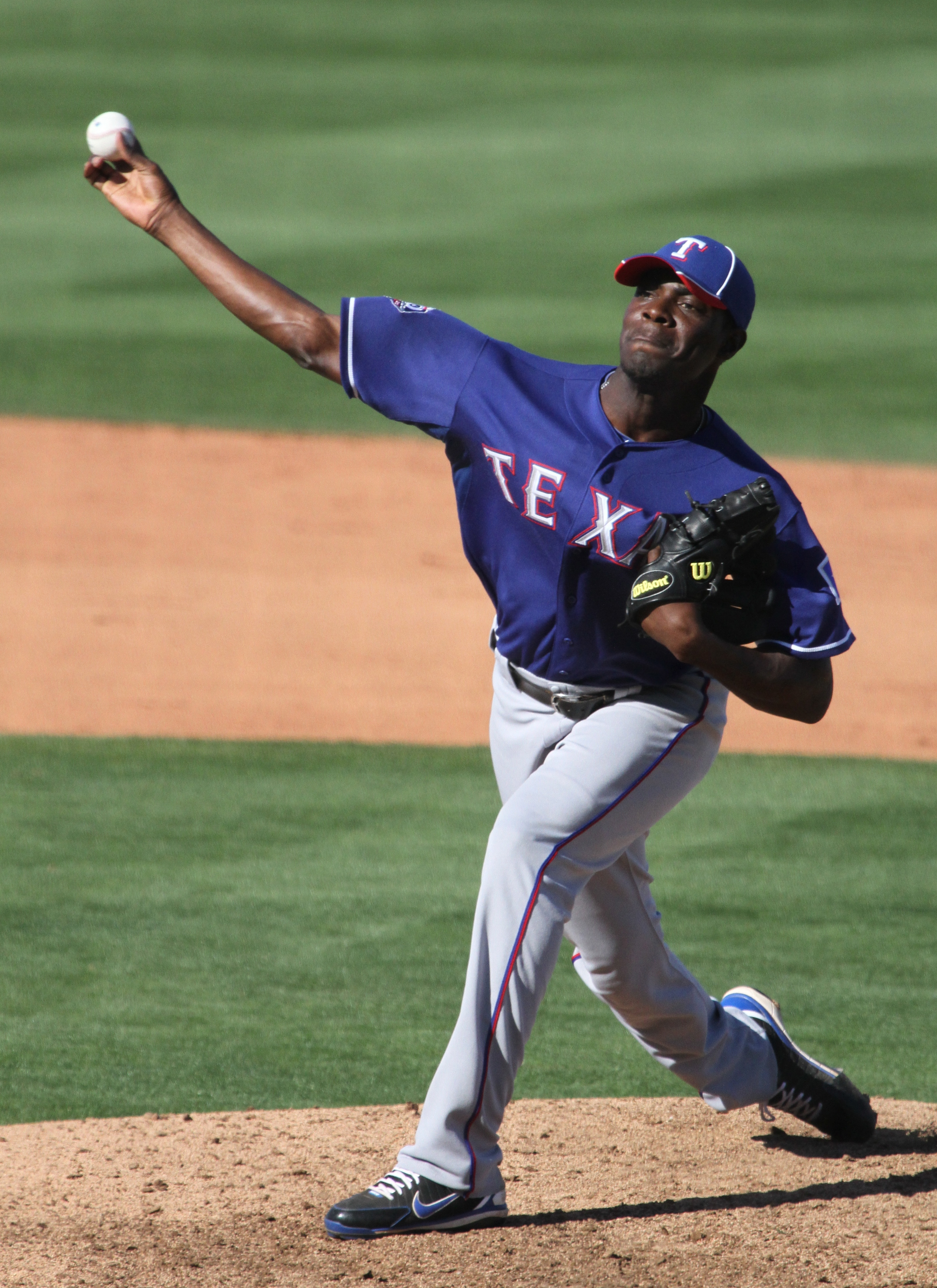
- Méndez with the Texas Rangers

Free agent
- Pitcher / Coach
- Born: July 25, 1990 (age 36); San Pedro de Macorís, Dominican Republic
- Bats: Right Throws: Right

Professional debut
- MLB: July 8, 2014, for the Texas Rangers
- NPB: July 22, 2017, for the Hanshin Tigers

MLB statistics (through 2015 season)
- Win–loss record: 0–2
- Earned run average: 3.09
- Strikeouts: 32

NPB statistics (through 2017 season)
- Win–loss record: 0-0
- Earned run average: 6.52
- Strikeouts: 9
- Stats at Baseball Reference

Teams
- Texas Rangers (2014–2015); Boston Red Sox (2015); Hanshin Tigers (2017)

Román Junior Méndez Pérez (born July 25, 1990) is a Dominican professional baseball pitcher and coach who is a free agent. He has previously played in Major League Baseball (MLB) for the Texas Rangers and Boston Red Sox, and in Nippon Professional Baseball (NPB) for the Hanshin Tigers. He made his MLB debut with the Rangers in 2014, and signed with the Tecolotes de los Dos Laredos of the Mexican League in 2019.

== Professional career ==
=== Boston Red Sox ===
On July 16, 2007, Méndez signed with the Boston Red Sox as an international free agent. Méndez made his professional debut with the DSL Red Sox in 2008. He spent the 2009 season with the rookie ball GCL Red Sox, registering a 2–3 record and 1.99 ERA with 47 strikeouts in 12 games. Méndez was assigned to the Single-A Greenville Drive to begin the 2010 season, but was later demoted to the Low-A Lowell Spinners after recording an 11.40 ERA in 6 appearances.

=== Texas Rangers ===
On July 31, 2010, Méndez was traded, along with Chris McGuiness, to the Texas Rangers in exchange for Jarrod Saltalamacchia. He finished the season in Low-A with the Spokane Indians. In 2011, Méndez spent the season in Single-A with the Hickory Crawdads, registering a 9–1 record and 3.31 ERA in 26 games.

Méndez was added to the Rangers' 40-man roster on November 21, 2011. He split the 2012 season between three Rangers affiliates, the Double-A Frisco RoughRiders, the High-A Myrtle Beach Pelicans, and the rookie ball AZL Rangers on a three-game rehab assignment, accumulating a 6–7 record and 4.43 ERA between the clubs. Méndez did not make a major league appearance in 2013 as well, spending the season in Frisco, pitching to a 1.82 ERA with 24 strikeouts in 16 games. He was assigned to the Triple-A Round Rock Express to begin the 2014 season.

The Rangers promoted Méndez to the major leagues on July 8, 2014, and he made his MLB debut that day, pitching 2.0 scoreless innings against the Houston Astros. Méndez made 30 appearances for the Rangers in 2014, registering a 2.18 ERA with 22 strikeouts. Méndez began the 2015 season with Texas, but was optioned to Round Rock after pitching to a 5.40 ERA in 12 appearances. He was designated for assignment by the Rangers on September 1, 2015.

=== Boston Red Sox (second stint) ===
On September 11, 2015, Méndez was claimed off waivers by the Boston Red Sox. In 3 late season games for the Red Sox, Méndez allowed 1 run in 2.0 innings of work. On December 2, 2015, Méndez was designated for assignment by the Red Sox. Méndez spent the 2016 season in Triple-A with the Pawtucket Red Sox, and pitched to a 4–2 record and 3.38 ERA with 59 strikeouts without receiving a call-up to the big league club. On November 7, 2016, he elected free agency.

=== Hanshin Tigers ===
On November 30, 2016, Méndez signed with the Hanshin Tigers of Nippon Professional Baseball (NPB) for the 2017 season. In 8 games for Hanshin, he struggled to a 6.52 ERA and became a free agent after the season.

=== Washington Nationals ===
On January 3, 2018, Méndez signed a minor league contract with the Washington Nationals. He made 44 appearances out of the bullpen for the Double-A Harrisburg Senators, compiling a 3.67 ERA with 59 strikeouts and 11 saves across 54 innings of work. Méndez elected free agency following the season on November 2.

=== Tecolotes de Los Dos Laredos ===
On April 3, 2019, Méndez signed with the Tecolotes de los Dos Laredos of the Mexican League. In 59 games 62.1 innings of relief he went 1–7 with a 3.75 ERA with 65 strikeouts and 32 saves.

Méndez did not play in a game in 2020 due to the cancellation of the LMB season because of the COVID-19 pandemic. He later became a free agent.

=== Saraperos de Saltillo ===
On April 23, 2022, Méndez signed with the Saraperos de Saltillo. Mèndez appeared in 38 games for Saltillo, working to a 4–0 record and 5.01 ERA with 33 strikeouts in 41 1/3 innings pitched. He was released on July 25.

=== Bravos de León ===
On February 13, 2023, Méndez signed with the Bravos de León. In 16 relief appearances, Méndez registered a 1–2 record with a 7.02 ERA and 13 strikeouts in 16 2/3 innings. He was waived on May 21.

=== Olmecas de Tabasco ===
On May 23, 2023, Méndez was claimed off waivers by the Olmecas de Tabasco. In 13 relief appearances, he posted a 0–2 record with a 5.40 ERA and 15 strikeouts in 11 2/3 innings. Méndez was waived on July 4.

=== Conspiradores de Querétaro ===
On January 25, 2024, Mendez signed with the Conspiradores de Querétaro of the Mexican League. In 46 appearances for Querétaro, he posted an 8–3 record and 5.82 ERA with 37 strikeouts across 43 1/3 innings pitched.

On June 7, 2025, Méndez was registered as a player-coach for the team. In 43 games (2 starts) he threw 45.1 innings going 4–1 with a 5.76 ERA with more walks (28) than strikeouts (21) and one save.

In 2026, Méndez returned for a third straight season with Querétaro. In 45 games he threw 33.1 innings of relief going 1-5 with a 8.10 ERA with 24 strikeouts and one save. He was released on October 30.
