= Matt West (baseball) =

American baseball player (born 1988)

- Pitcher
- Born: November 21, 1988 (age 37); Houston, Texas, U.S.
- Batted: Right Threw: Right

Professional debut
- MLB: July 10, 2014, for the Texas Rangers
- NPB: May 3, 2017, for the Orix Buffaloes

Last appearance
- MLB: June 21, 2015, for the Los Angeles Dodgers
- NPB: May 5, 2017, for the Orix Buffaloes

MLB statistics
- Win–loss record: 0–0
- Earned run average: 3.86
- Strikeouts: 5

NPB statistics
- Win–loss record: 0–0
- Earned run average: 4.50
- Strikeouts: 0
- Stats at Baseball Reference

Teams
- Texas Rangers (2014); Los Angeles Dodgers (2015); Orix Buffaloes (2017)

Matthew Robert O'Neil West (born November 21, 1988) is an American former professional baseball pitcher. He played in Major League Baseball (MLB) for the Texas Rangers and Los Angeles Dodgers.

== Playing career ==
=== Texas Rangers ===
West was drafted by the Texas Rangers in the second round of the 2007 Major League Baseball draft out of Bellaire High School, where he was a three-year All-District player. Originally an infielder, he began his professional career with the Arizona League Rangers and hit .301 in 29 games. Near the end of the season, he was suspended for 50 games for testing positive for a "performance-enhancing substance." The suspension continued into the following season and when he returned he was assigned to the Spokane Indians of the short-season Northwest League, where he hit .258 in 67 games. He spent the next two seasons with the Hickory Crawdads of the South Atlantic League, hitting only .229 in 250 games with 18 homers and 103 RBI.

Because of his poor hitting stats and perceived arm strength the Rangers chose to convert him to a pitcher prior to the 2011 season. He pitched in 23 games for Spokane in 2011 and was 1–2 with a 3.12 ERA and nine saves. He was added to the Rangers 40-man roster after the season. In 2012, he appeared in 17 games for the High–A Myrtle Beach Pelicans of the Carolina League. He was 0–3 with a 6.64 ERA before he was shut down with arm injuries. It was revealed that he had torn the ulnar collateral ligament in his right elbow and had to undergo Tommy John surgery, which cause him to miss the 2013 season. He began 2014 with the Double–A Frisco RoughRiders of the Texas League and was promoted to the Triple–A Round Rock Express of the Pacific Coast League. In 41 combined games, he was 5–3 with a 3.35 ERA and also made one start.

West was promoted to the Majors on July 10, 2014, and pitched two scoreless innings in his debut against the Los Angeles Angels of Anaheim. Overall, he appeared in three MLB games, working four innings and allowing three runs.

=== Toronto Blue Jays ===
West was designated for assignment by the Rangers on January 5, 2015, and claimed by the Toronto Blue Jays nine days later. He was invited to spring training and sent to minor league camp on March 14. West was sent to the Double-A New Hampshire Fisher Cats on April 6. On May 2, he was designated for assignment by Toronto. He had pitched 12.1 scoreless innings in seven games for the Fisher Cats.

=== Los Angeles Dodgers ===
West was traded to the Los Angeles Dodgers in exchange for cash considerations on May 4, 2015 and assigned to the Double–A Tulsa Drillers. He was later promoted to the Triple–A Oklahoma City Dodgers on May 27. He was called up to the majors by the Dodgers on May 31 but was optioned back to the minors the following day without appearing in a game. He was designated for assignment on July 11. He appeared in 26 games in the minors for the Dodgers organization in 2015 with a 0.56 ERA for the Double-A Tulsa Drillers and a 7.83 ERA for Triple-A Oklahoma City. He also pitched in three innings over two games for the Dodgers, without allowing an earned run. He was given a non-roster invitation to Dodgers spring training in 2016. In 39 games for Oklahoma City in 2016, he was 3–0 with a 2.33 ERA. The Dodgers released West on September 1, 2016.

=== Orix Buffaloes ===
On December 13, 2016, West signed with the Orix Buffaloes of Nippon Professional Baseball.

On December 2, 2017, he became free agent.

=== Sugar Land Skeeters ===
On January 24, 2018, West signed a minor league contract with the Detroit Tigers. He was released on March 28, 2018.

On May 17, 2018, West signed with the Sugar Land Skeeters of the Atlantic League of Professional Baseball. He re-signed with the team for the 2019 season.

On December 2, 2019, West signed with the Olmecas de Tabasco of the Mexican League for the 2020 season. However, the season was later canceled due to the COVID-19 pandemic.

In July 2020, West signed on to play for the Sugar Land Skeeters of the Constellation Energy League (a makeshift 4-team independent league created as a result of the pandemic) for the 2020 season. On April 2, 2021, the Olmecas released West.

== Coaching career ==
On October 12, 2023, West was hired as the pitching coach for Arizona Christian University.
