= Pedro Figueroa =

Dominican baseball player (born 1985)

- Starting pitcher
- Born: November 23, 1985 (age 40); Santo Domingo, Dominican Republic
- Batted: Left Threw: Left

MLB debut
- April 21, 2012, for the Oakland Athletics

Last MLB appearance
- April 22, 2014, for the Texas Rangers

MLB statistics
- Win–loss record: 2–1
- Earned run average: 4.28
- Strikeouts: 20
- Stats at Baseball Reference

Teams
- Oakland Athletics (2012–2013); Texas Rangers (2014)

Pedro José Figueroa Vizcaíno (born November 23, 1985) is a Dominican former professional baseball pitcher. He played in Major League Baseball (MLB) for the Oakland Athletics and Texas Rangers.

== Playing career ==
=== Oakland Athletics ===
Figueroa signed with the Oakland Athletics as an international free agent on November 20, 2003. He made his professional debut in 2006 and split time between the Dominican Summer League Athletics and the rookie–level Arizona League Athletics.

For the 2007 and 2008 seasons, he played for the Low–A Vancouver Canadians, going 4–7 with a 4.07 ERA and 112 strikeouts. For the 2009 season, he split time between the Single-A Kane County Cougars and High-A Stockton Ports, accumulating a 13–6 record and 3.38 ERA with 145 strikeouts across 152 innings pitched.

Entering the 2010 season, Figueroa was ranked fifth in Oakland's farm system according to Baseball America. Despite not playing above Single-A, Oakland had added him to their 40-man roster on November 20, 2009, to protect him from the Rule 5 draft. In the 2010 season, Figueroa made 13 starts for the Double-A Midland RockHounds, posting a 1–6 record and 5.30 ERA with 57 strikeouts; after suffering a left elbow strain in June, he underwent Tommy John surgery and missed the remainder of the year. He spent much of the 2011 season in rehabilitation, making two starts for the rookie-level AZL Athletics.

Figueroa began the 2012 season with the Triple-A Sacramento River Cats, pitching a total of seven innings without allowing a run. On April 21, 2012, Figueroa was promoted to the major leagues for the first time, replacing Graham Godfrey in the bullpen. He made his MLB debut later that day. Figueroa made 19 appearances for Oakland during his rookie campaign, recording a 3.32 ERA with 14 strikeouts across 21 2/3 innings pitched.

Figueroa pitched in five contests for Oakland during the 2013 season, but struggled to a 12.00 ERA with three strikeouts across three innings of work. Figueroa was released by the Athletics organization on December 20, 2013, following the signing of Chris Gimenez.

=== Texas Rangers ===
On January 2, 2014, Figueroa was claimed off waivers by the Tampa Bay Rays. He was designated for assignment on January 23, following the signing of Grant Balfour. Figueroa was claimed off waivers by the Texas Rangers on January 29. He made 10 appearances for the Rangers, logging a 2–1 record and 4.00 ERA with 3 strikeouts across 9 innings of work. On April 22, Figueroa was removed from a game against the Oakland Athletics after hitting a batter with his only pitch thrown; the removal came due to an elbow injury. Two days later, he was diagnosed with a torn ulnar collateral ligament and flexor tendon in his left elbow. On April 30, he underwent Tommy John surgery, ending his season. On October 6, Figueroa was removed from the 40-man roster and sent outright to the Triple–A Round Rock Express.

== Coaching career ==
On February 5, 2025, the Athletics hired Figueroa to serve as a pitching coach for the Dominican Summer League Athletics.
