= Tommy Joseph =

American baseball player (born 1991)

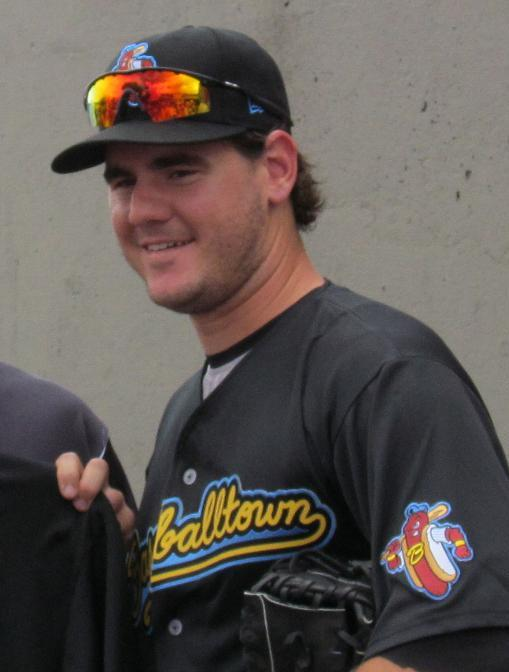
- Joseph at the 2012 Eastern League All-Star Game

Texas Rangers
- First baseman / Hitting coach
- Born: July 16, 1991 (age 35); Phoenix, Arizona, U.S.
- Batted: Right Threw: Right

Professional debut
- MLB: May 13, 2016, for the Philadelphia Phillies
- KBO: March 23, 2019, for the LG Twins

Last appearance
- MLB: September 30, 2017, for the Philadelphia Phillies
- KBO: June 27, 2019, for the LG Twins

MLB statistics
- Batting average: .247
- Home runs: 43
- Runs batted in: 116

KBO statistics
- Batting average: .274
- Home runs: 9
- Runs batted in: 36
- Stats at Baseball Reference

Teams
- As player: Philadelphia Phillies (2016–2017); LG Twins (2019); As coach: Seattle Mariners (2024); Baltimore Orioles (2025)

Thomas Richard Joseph (born July 16, 1991) is an American former professional baseball first baseman and coach who currently serves as the assistant hitting coach for the Texas Rangers of Major League Baseball (MLB). He played in MLB for the Philadelphia Phillies in 2016 and 2017, and in the KBO League for the LG Twins. Joseph is the only player in MLB history to play 2 seasons and hit at least 20 homers in each of those 2 seasons, but not play another season in MLB again.

== High school ==
Joseph attended Horizon High School in Scottsdale, Arizona, where he played for the school's baseball team. A first baseman in his first three years of high school, Joseph became a catcher in his senior year. In 2009, he was named the Arizona high school player of the year.

== Playing career ==
=== San Francisco Giants ===
The San Francisco Giants selected Joseph in the second round, with the 55th overall selection, of the 2009 Major League Baseball draft as a catcher and first baseman. In 2010, Joseph was named a South Atlantic League all-star for his performance with the Augusta GreenJackets. He suffered a concussion during the 2010 season. The Giants invited Joseph to spring training in 2011. Joseph played for the Richmond Flying Squirrels of the Double–A Eastern League in 2012, and appeared in the All-Star Futures Game that year.

=== Philadelphia Phillies ===
On July 31, 2012, the Giants traded Joseph with Nate Schierholtz and Seth Rosin to the Philadelphia Phillies in exchange for Hunter Pence. The Phillies assigned Joseph to the Reading Fightin Phils of the Eastern League. After the 2012 season, he was assigned to the Peoria Javelinas of the Arizona Fall League (AFL), and participated in the AFL Rising Stars Game.

Joseph played in only 36 games in the 2013 season due to a concussion. The Phillies added him to their 40-man roster on November 20, 2013, to protect him from being exposed to the Rule 5 draft. Joseph suffered a wrist injury in 2014 which limited him to 27 games played, and required season ending surgery. Joseph began the 2015 season with the Lehigh Valley IronPigs of the Triple–A International League, where he suffered his third concussion in May 2015. Due to the concussions, the Phillies converted him into a first baseman.

After posting a .347 average and a .611 slugging percentage in the first 27 games of the 2016 season, the Phillies promoted Joseph from Lehigh Valley to the major leagues on May 13, 2016. He hit his first major league home run on May 17. On June 1, Phillies manager Pete Mackanin announced his plans to give Joseph extended playing time at first base and keep the slumping veteran Ryan Howard on the bench. Joseph officially supplanted Howard as the everyday first baseman on June 10 and punctuated the move by hitting his sixth and seventh home runs of the season that day, with Mackanin calling Joseph "the real deal".

In 2017, Joseph batted .240 with a .289 on-base percentage. After the 2017 season, the Phillies acquired Carlos Santana to play first base.

On March 12, 2018, Joseph was designated for assignment.

=== Texas Rangers ===
On March 19, 2018, the Texas Rangers claimed Joseph off waivers. He was designated for assignment following the promotion of Kevin Jepsen on March 29. Joseph cleared waivers and was sent outright to the Double–A Frisco RoughRiders on April 2. In 84 games for Round Rock, he batted .284/.353/.549 with 21 home runs and 67 RBI. Joseph declared free agency on October 2.

=== LG Twins ===
On November 28, 2018, Joseph signed a one-year, $1 million contract with the LG Twins of the KBO League.

Joseph was waived by the Twins on July 9, 2019.

=== Boston Red Sox ===
On August 5, 2019, Joseph signed a minor league contract with the Boston Red Sox, and was assigned to the Gulf Coast League Red Sox. In 15 games split between the GCL Red Sox and Double–A Portland Sea Dogs, he slashed .263/.307/.386 with one home run and seven RBI.

Joseph did not play in a game for the organization in 2020 due to the cancellation of the minor league season because of the COVID-19 pandemic. He became a minor league free agent on November 2, 2020.

=== Team Texas ===
In July 2020, Joseph signed to play for Team Texas of the Constellation Energy League (a makeshift 4-team independent league created as a result of the COVID-19 pandemic) for the 2020 season.

== Coaching career ==
=== New York Mets ===
On March 8, 2021, Joseph was announced as the hitting coach for the St. Lucie Mets, the Low-A affiliate of the New York Mets. On January 6, 2022, Joseph was announced as the hitting coach for the Binghamton Rumble Ponies, the Double-A affiliate of the New York Mets.

=== San Francisco Giants ===
On March 8, 2023, Joseph was hired as the hitting coach for the Eugene Emeralds, the High-A affiliate of the San Francisco Giants.

=== Seattle Mariners ===
On December 7, 2023 Joseph was hired as the Seattle Mariners' assistant hitting coach for the 2024 season.

=== Baltimore Orioles ===
On November 5, 2024, the Baltimore Orioles hired Joseph away from the Mariners organization to serve as their assistant hitting coach alongside primary hitting coach Cody Asche. On October 28, 2025, it was announced that Joseph would not return to the Orioles for the 2026 season.

=== Texas Rangers ===
On November 12, 2026, Joseph was hired to serve as the assistant hitting coach for the Texas Rangers.
