= Guilder Rodríguez =

Venezuelan baseball player and coach (born 1983)

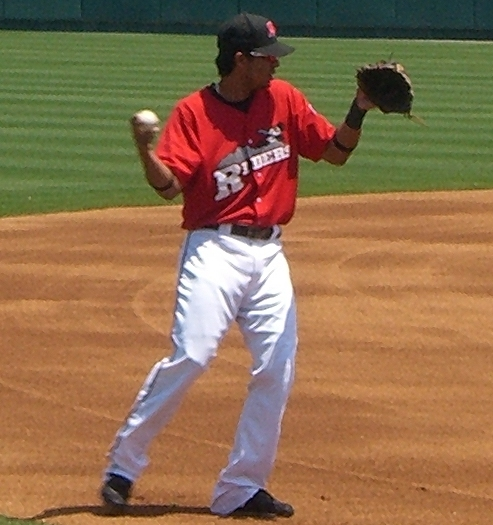
- Rodríguez with the Frisco RoughRiders in 2011
- Infielder
- Born: July 24, 1983 (age 43); Barquisimeto, Venezuela
- Batted: Switch Threw: Right

MLB debut
- September 9, 2014, for the Texas Rangers

Last MLB appearance
- September 22, 2014, for the Texas Rangers

MLB statistics
- Batting average: .167
- Home runs: 0
- Runs batted in: 1
- Stats at Baseball Reference

Teams
- Texas Rangers (2014)

Guilder Alfredo Rodríguez Pérez (born July 24, 1983) is a Venezuelan former professional baseball infielder and current coach in the Texas Rangers organization. He played in Major League Baseball (MLB) for the Rangers in 2014.

== Playing career ==
=== Milwaukee Brewers ===
==== Minor leagues ====
Rodríguez spent his first 7 professional seasons (2002–2008) in the Milwaukee Brewers organization.

=== Texas Rangers ===
Rodríguez was selected in the minor league phase of the 2008 Rule 5 draft by the Texas Rangers. Rodríguez spent 2009-2015 playing at the Double–A and Triple–A levels in the Rangers organization.

==== Major leagues ====
After 13 years in the minor leagues, Rodríguez was called up to the majors for the first time on September 7, 2014, and made his major league debut two days later. With a total of 1,095 games, Rodríguez had played in the most minor league games by any player not yet called to the major leagues. On September 22, 2014 against the Houston Astros in Arlington, Rodríguez recorded his first two career hits, the second of which gave him his first career RBI. In 7 games during his rookie campaign, he went 2–for–12 (.167) with one RBI and one walk. On October 6, Rodríguez was removed from the 40-man roster and sent outright to the Triple–A Round Rock Express. Rodríguez became a free agent on November 7. He re-signed with the Rangers on a minor league contract on January 13, 2015. He announced his retirement on September 17, 2015.

== Coaching career ==
After retiring from playing, Rodríguez became a coach in the Texas Rangers organization. He served as a coach for the Dominican Summer League Rangers in 2016, and was a coach for the Arizona League Rangers from 2017 through 2021. He spent the 2022 season as a developmental coach for the Down East Wood Ducks.

In 2025, Rodriguez was named bench coach of the ACL Rangers the rookie level affiliate of the Texas Rangers.

== Personal life ==
Rodríguez's brother, Guillermo, played in MLB for the San Francisco Giants and Baltimore Orioles.

== See also ==
- List of Major League Baseball players from Venezuela
- Rule 5 draft results
