= Phil Klein =

American baseball player (born 1989)

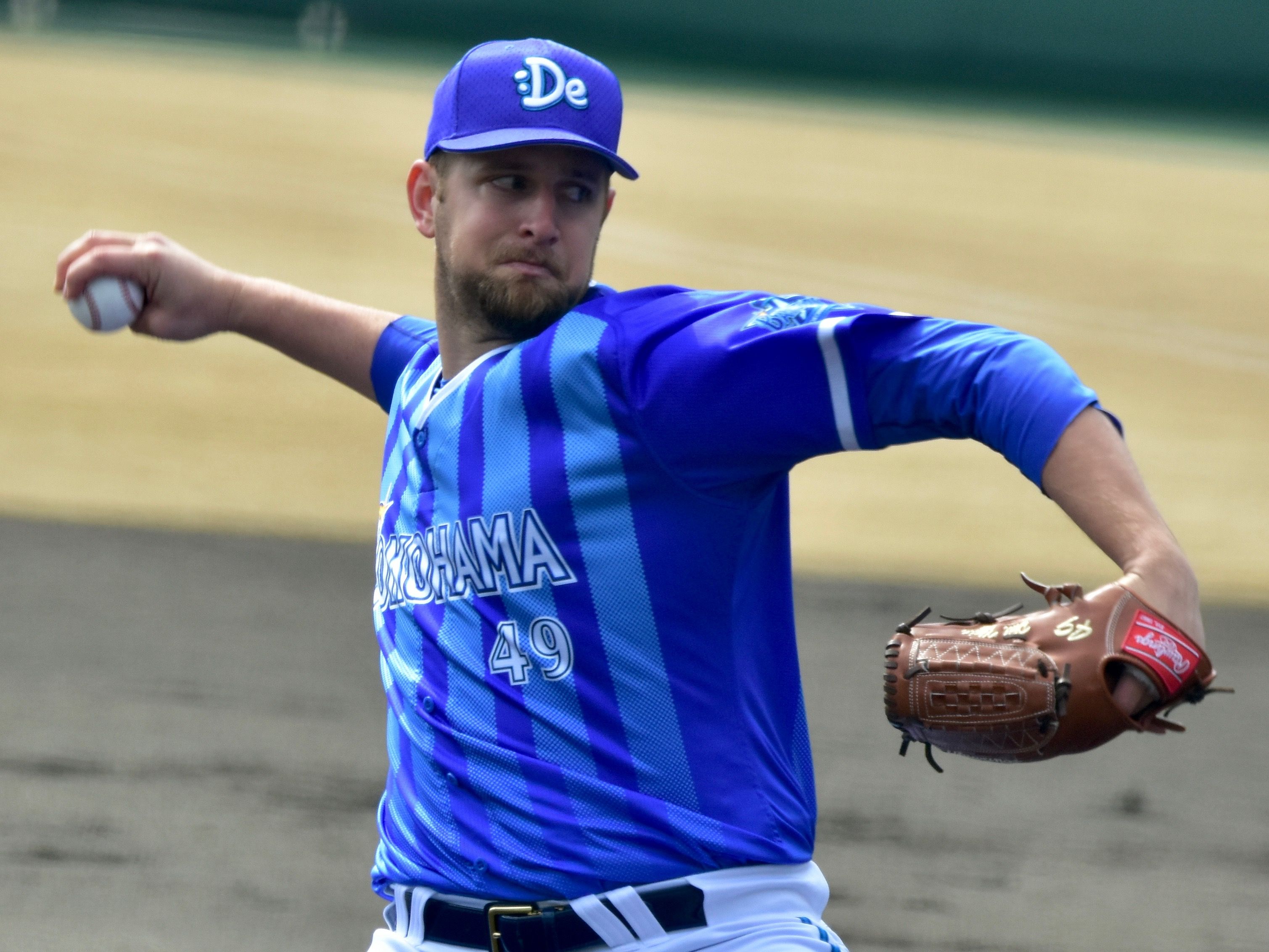
- Klein with Yokohama DeNA BayStars
- Pitcher
- Born: April 30, 1989 (age 37); Columbus, Ohio, U.S.
- Batted: Right Threw: Right

Professional debut
- MLB: August 1, 2014, for the Texas Rangers
- NPB: April 1, 2017, for the Yokohama DeNA BayStars

Last appearance
- MLB: October 1, 2016, for the Philadelphia Phillies
- NPB: 2017, for the Yokohama DeNA BayStars

MLB statistics
- Win–loss record: 2–3
- Earned run average: 5.50
- Strikeouts: 54

NPB statistics
- Win–loss record: 2–3
- Earned run average: 4.75
- Strikeouts: 27
- Stats at Baseball Reference

Teams
- Texas Rangers (2014–2016); Philadelphia Phillies (2016); Yokohama DeNA BayStars (2017)

Phil William Klein (born April 30, 1989) is an American former professional baseball pitcher. He played in Major League Baseball (MLB) for the Texas Rangers and Philadelphia Phillies; and in Nippon Professional Baseball (NPB) for the Yokohama DeNA BayStars.

== Career ==
Klein played college baseball at Youngstown State University from 2008 to 2011.

=== Texas Rangers ===
He was drafted by the Texas Rangers in the 30th round of the 2011 Major League Baseball draft.

Klein was called up to the major leagues for the first time on August 1, 2014. He made his first career start on May 20, 2015 against Boston. He pitched 5 1/3 innings while allowing 1 run and striking out 4 batters with a win.

=== Philadelphia Phillies ===
Klein was claimed off waivers by the Philadelphia Phillies on June 19, 2016. He was then optioned to Triple-A Lehigh Valley. He was called up to the Phillies on August 3 and was the starting pitcher the same night. Klein was released by the Phillies on December 14, 2016, to pursue an opportunity to play baseball in Asia.

=== Yokohama DeNA BayStars ===
Klein signed with the Yokohama DeNA BayStars of Nippon Professional Baseball for the 2017 season. He became a free agent after the 2017 season.
