= Seth Rosin =

American baseball player (born 1988)

- Pitcher
- Born: November 2, 1988 (age 37); Fargo, North Dakota, U.S.
- Batted: Right Threw: Right

MLB debut
- March 31, 2014, for the Texas Rangers

Last MLB appearance
- June 20, 2015, for the Philadelphia Phillies

MLB statistics
- Win–loss record: 1–0
- Earned run average: 12.00
- Strikeouts: 3
- Stats at Baseball Reference

Teams
- Texas Rangers (2014); Philadelphia Phillies (2015)

Seth Daniel Rosin (born November 2, 1988) is an American former Major League Baseball (MLB) pitcher who played for the Texas Rangers and Philadelphia Phillies in 2014 and 2015.

== Career ==
=== Amateur ===
Rosin attended Mounds View High School in Arden Hills, Minnesota. After graduating high school, the Minnesota Twins selected Rosin in the 28th round of the 2007 MLB draft. Rosin opted not to sign, and instead enrolled at the University of Minnesota, where he played college baseball for the Minnesota Golden Gophers, he was named to the All-Big Ten team in 2009 and 2010. In 2009, he played collegiate summer baseball with the Hyannis Mets of the Cape Cod Baseball League.

=== San Francisco Giants ===
The San Francisco Giants selected Rosin in the fourth round of the 2010 MLB draft, and Rosin signed. He spent 2010 through 2012 in the Giants farm system with the Salem-Keizer Volcanoes of the Low–A Northwest League, the Augusta Greenjackets of the Single–A Southern League, and the San Jose Giants of the High–A California League.

=== Philadelphia Phillies ===
The Giants traded Rosin, Nate Schierholtz, and Tommy Joseph to the Philadelphia Phillies in exchange for Hunter Pence on July 31, 2012. He played in 3 games for the Clearwater Threshers of the High–A Florida State League at the end of 2012 and was then promoted to the Reading Phillies of the Double–A Eastern League. in 2013, where he was 9-6 with a 4.33 ERA in 26 games (23 starts).

=== Los Angeles Dodgers ===
The New York Mets selected Rosin from the Philadelphia Phillies in the 2013 Rule 5 Draft. He was then traded to the Los Angeles Dodgers that same day.

Rosin made the Dodgers 25-man Opening Day roster in 2014. However, he did not play in the opening series in Australia and was claimed off waivers by the Texas Rangers on March 26. Rosin was designated for assignment by the Rangers on April 9.

=== Philadelphia Phillies (second stint) ===
He cleared waivers and was returned to the Phillies, who assigned him to the Lehigh Valley IronPigs of the Triple–A International League. The Phillies demoted Rosin to Reading in June.

=== San Diego Padres ===
On January 31, 2016, Rosin signed a minor league contract with the San Diego Padres. He made five appearances for the Triple–A El Paso Chihuahuas, recording an 8.31 ERA with four strikeouts across 8 2/3 innings. Rosin elected free agency following the season on November 7.

=== St. Paul Saints ===
On February 21, 2017, Rosin signed a minor league contract with the Minnesota Twins. He was released by the Twins organization on March 25.

On April 20, 2017, Rosin signed with the St. Paul Saints of the American Association of Independent Professional Baseball.

=== San Francisco Giants (second stint) ===
On July 5, 2017, Rosin signed a minor league deal with the San Francisco Giants, who assigned him to the Double–A Richmond Flying Squirrels of the Eastern League. In 22 games, he recorded a 4.67 ERA with 26 strikeouts in 27.0 innings of work. Rosin elected free agency following the season on November 6.
