= Chris Gimenez =

American baseball player (born 1982)

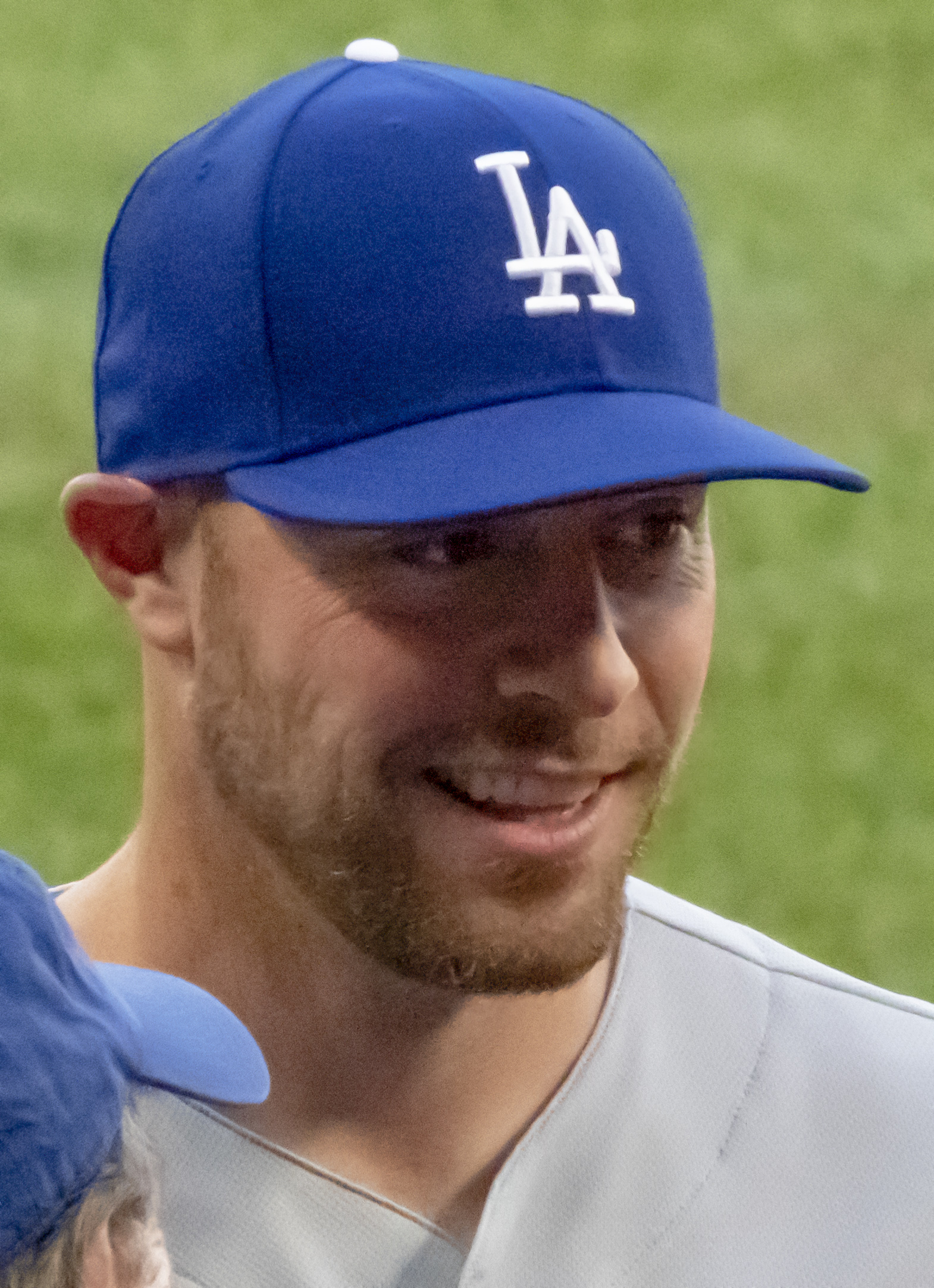
- Gimenez with the Los Angeles Dodgers in 2019
- Catcher
- Born: December 27, 1982 (age 43); Gilroy, California, U.S.
- Batted: Right Threw: Right

MLB debut
- June 3, 2009, for the Cleveland Indians

Last MLB appearance
- September 30, 2018, for the Minnesota Twins

MLB statistics
- Batting average: .218
- Home runs: 24
- Runs batted in: 89
- Stats at Baseball Reference

Teams
- Cleveland Indians (2009–2010); Seattle Mariners (2011); Tampa Bay Rays (2012–2013); Texas Rangers (2014); Cleveland Indians (2014); Texas Rangers (2015); Cleveland Indians (2016); Minnesota Twins (2017); Chicago Cubs (2018); Minnesota Twins (2018)

Christopher Paul Gimenez (/ˈdʒɪmənɛz/ JIM-ə-nez; born December 27, 1982) is an American former professional baseball catcher. He played in Major League Baseball (MLB) for the Cleveland Indians, Seattle Mariners, Tampa Bay Rays, Texas Rangers, Chicago Cubs, and Minnesota Twins.

== Career ==
=== Amateur ===
In 2001, Gimenez graduated from Gilroy High School in Gilroy, California. He was drafted by the Colorado Rockies in the 34th round (1,024th overall) of the 2001 Major League Baseball draft, but did not sign and instead attended the University of Nevada.

=== Cleveland Indians ===
The Cleveland Indians selected Gimenez in the 19th round (557th overall) of the 2004 Major League Baseball draft. He signed and joined the Indians minor league system, playing with the Mahoning Valley Scrappers, Lake County Captains, Kinston Indians, Akron Aeros, Buffalo Bisons, and Columbus Clippers. He was a non-roster invitee to spring training for the 2008 and 2009 Indians, but started each season in the minors.

Gimenez made his MLB debut on June 3, 2009. On February 24, 2010, Gimenez was outrighted to Triple-A Columbus to make room on the 40-man roster for Russell Branyan. He remained in camp with the Indians for the duration of spring training as a non-roster invitee. On July 10, 2010, Gimenez's contract was purchased by the Indians, and he was added to the active roster, replacing Mike Redmond, who was designated for assignment. Gimenez was outrighted to Triple-A Columbus on October 29, 2010, removing him from the 40-man roster. He filed for free agency on November 6, 2010.

=== Seattle Mariners ===
On December 14, 2010, Gimenez signed a minor league contract with the Seattle Mariners. On December 12, 2011, the Mariners announced that Gimenez had been non-tendered along with pitcher Dan Cortes. Two days later, on December 14, the club announced that they had re-signed Gimenez to a contract. He was designated for assignment on February 6, 2012, and soon after, he declared for free agency.

=== Tampa Bay Rays ===
The Tampa Bay Rays signed him to a minor league contract on February 16. He also received an invitation to spring training. He was with the organization for two seasons.

=== Texas Rangers and Cleveland Indians ===
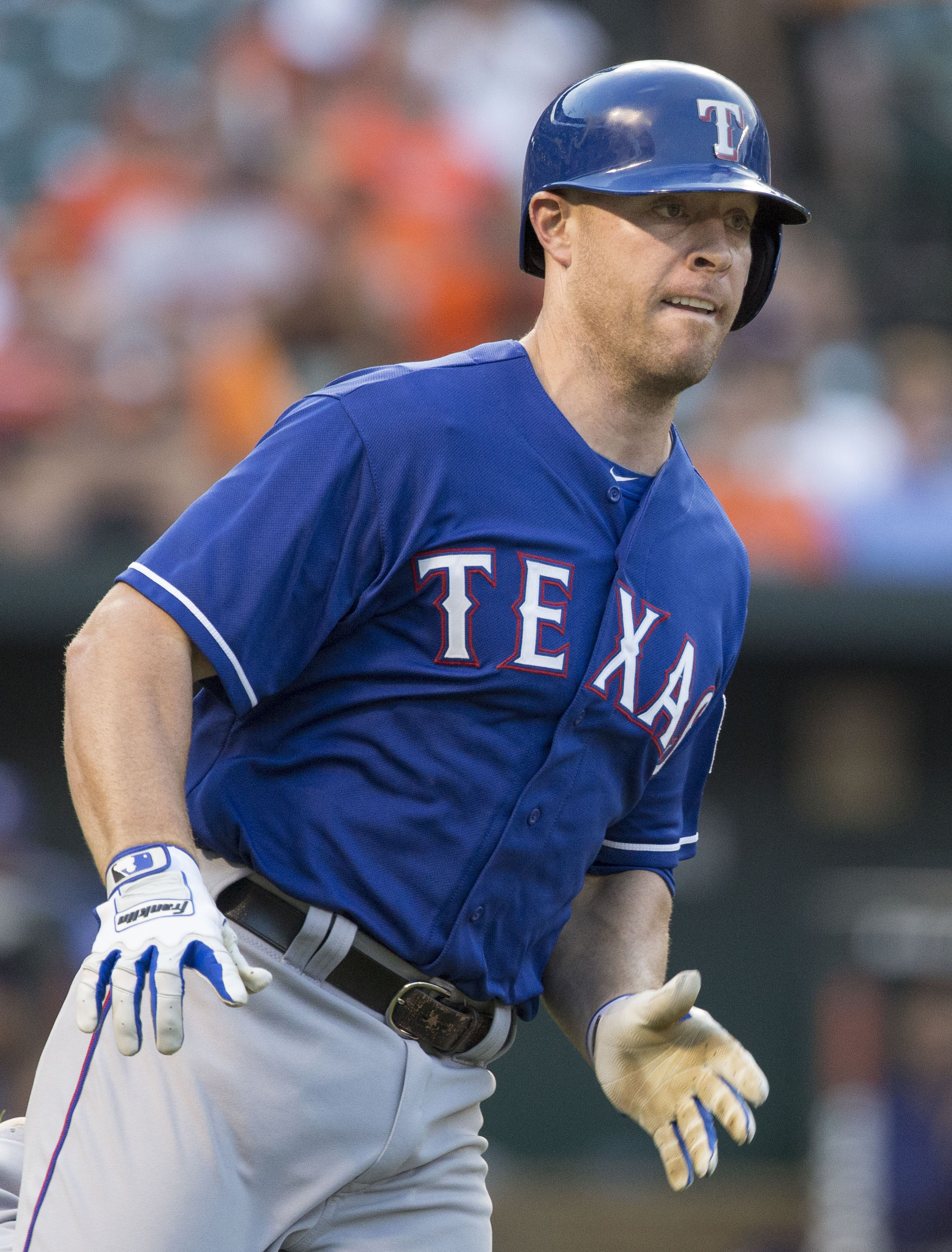
Chris Gimenez playing for the Rangers in 2014

On December 20, 2013, Gimenez was claimed off waivers by the Oakland Athletics. He was then claimed off waivers by the Texas Rangers on March 28, 2014. He made the Rangers opening day roster on March 31, but was designated for assignment the next day. He elected to become a free agent on April 5. He re-signed a minor league contract on April 9 and was assigned to the Rangers' Triple-A affiliate, the Round Rock Express.

Gimenez's returned to the Rangers when his contract was selected from Round Rock on May 20 when J. P. Arencibia was optioned to Round Rock. He made the first pitching appearance of his Major League career on July 10, 2014, in the ninth inning of a blowout loss for the Rangers against the Los Angeles Angels. He pitched a 1-2-3 inning, including a swinging strikeout of C. J. Cron. Gimenez was designated for assignment on August 7. He was acquired by the Cleveland Indians on August 23, 2014.

Gimenez signed a minor league deal with the Rangers on November 20, 2014. On July 31, 2015, Gimenez was recalled from Triple-A Round Rock after Tomas Telis was traded to the Miami Marlins. He appeared in the postseason for the first time in the 2015 ALDS.

Gimenez was traded back to the Cleveland Indians on May 4, 2016, in exchange for cash considerations. On November 18, 2016, Gimenez was outrighted off the 40-man roster; he subsequently elected free agency on November 21, 2016.

=== Minnesota Twins and Chicago Cubs ===
On January 12, 2017, Gimenez signed a minor league contract with the Minnesota Twins that included an invitation to spring training. Gimenez made the Twins' 25-man roster out of camp.

On April 23, 2017, Gimenez pitched for his fourth time to Andrew Romine of the Detroit Tigers in the top of the 9th inning, resulting in a pop-fly out to retire the inning. He was outrighted to AAA on November 6, 2017.

On January 22, 2018, Gimenez signed a minor league deal with the Chicago Cubs. He made his debut with the team on May 28, 2018, with a single in his first at-bat against the Pittsburgh Pirates. On July 4, 2018, the Cubs designated him for assignment.

On August 30, 2018, Gimenez and cash were traded back to the Twins in exchange for Bobby Wilson.

=== Coaching ===
After the 2018 season, he retired from playing to take on the role of Game Planning Coach for the Los Angeles Dodgers.
