= Arizona Complex League Rangers =

- Founded in 2003; Surprise, Arizona

Minor league affiliations
- Class: Rookie
- League: Arizona Complex League
- Division: West Division
- Previous leagues: Arizona League (2003–2020)

Major league affiliations
- Team: Texas Rangers

Minor league titles
- League titles (2): 2012; 2019
- Division titles (4): 2010; 2019; 2022; 2024

Team data
- Name: ACL Rangers
- Previous names: AZL Rangers (2003–2020)
- Colors: Royal blue, red, white
- Ballpark: Surprise Stadium
- Owner/ Operator: Texas Rangers
- Manager: Nick Janssen

The Arizona Complex League Rangers are a Rookie-level affiliate of the Texas Rangers, competing in the Arizona Complex League of Minor League Baseball. The team plays its home games at Surprise Stadium in Surprise, Arizona. The team is composed mainly of players who are in their first year of professional baseball either as draftees or non-drafted free agents.

== History ==
The team began play in 2003 in the Arizona League (AZL), succeeding the Texas Rangers' previous rookie team, the Gulf Coast League Rangers based in Florida. The team has won two league championships, in 2010 and 2019.

Before the 2021 season, the Arizona League was renamed the Arizona Complex League (ACL).

== Roster ==
Arizona Complex League Rangers roster
Players	Coaches/Other
Pitchers: -- Ben Abeldt; 56 Angel Anazco; -- Jake Barbee; 48 Alejandro Chiquillo; -- Cory Geinzer; -- Jacob Johnson; -- Daniel Keaney; -- Enyel Lopez; -- Louis Marinaro; -- Mason McConnaughey; -- J. D. McReynolds; 47 Moises Morales; -- Luimy Munoz; -- AJ Russell; 11 Michael Valverde; Catchers: 15 Sebastian Baquera; 21 Javier Sanchez; 32 Jhocsuanth Vargas; Infielders: 6 Angel Arredondo; -- Noah Franklin; -- Carter Garate; 2 Curley Martha; -- Jack Wheeler; Outfielders: 25 Andry Batista; -- Jamaurion McQueen; 1 Rashawn Pinder	Manager: -- Esteban Cardoza-Oquendo; Coaches: -- Sharnol Adriana (hitting); 58 Alvaro Castillo (pitching); -- Wes Hunt (development); -- Landon Hutchison (pitching); -- Trey Newman (development); 60 Guilder Rodríguez (hitting); -- Austin Turner (hitting); -- Zach Woolard (pitching); 60-day injured list: 12 Jesus Lopez; -- Julius Sanchez; 7-day injured list; * On Texas Rangers 40-man roster; ~ Development list; # Rehab assignment; ∞ Reserve list; ‡ Restricted list; § Suspended list; † Temporarily inactive list; Roster updated March 18, 2026; → More rosters: MiLB • Arizona Complex League; → Texas Rangers minor league players

== Notable alumni ==
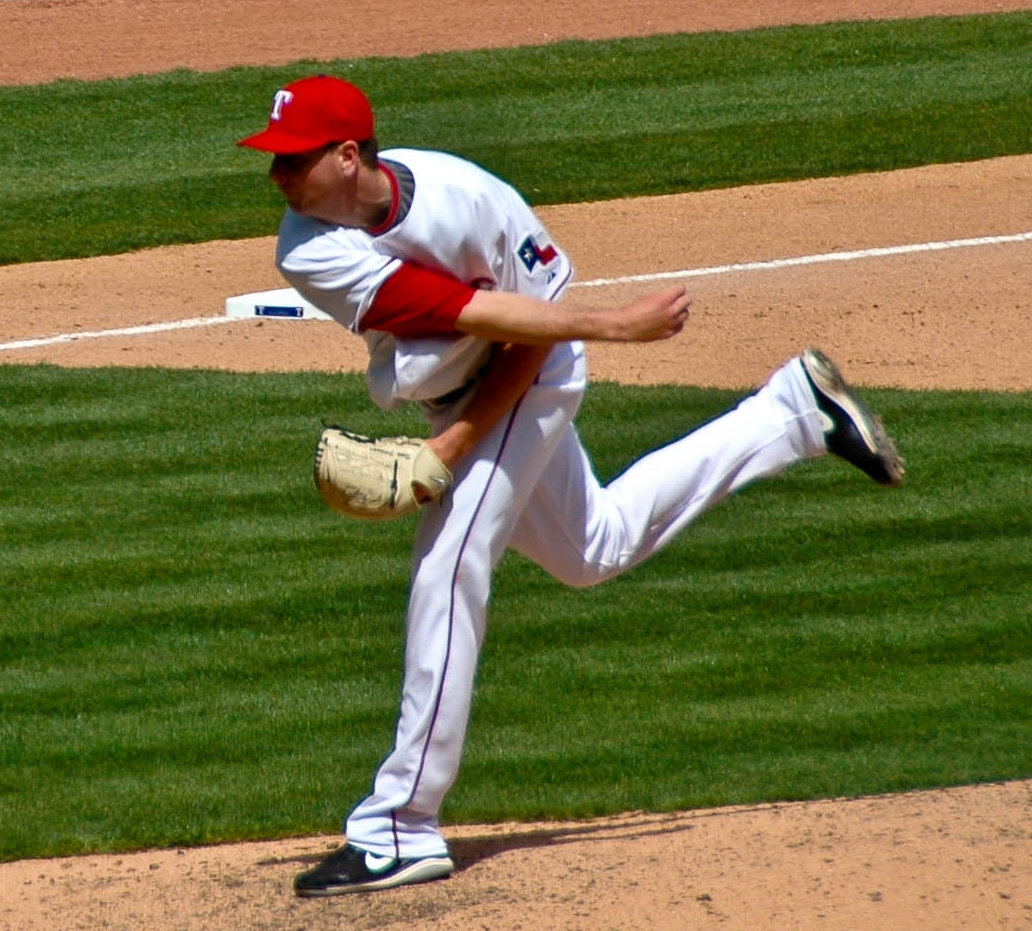
Scott Feldman pitched for the team in 2003 and 2004.

Notable players for the team include:

- Jordan Akins
- Jorge Alfaro
- Alex Claudio
- John Danks
- Jerad Eickhoff
- Scott Feldman
- Armando Galarraga
- Joey Gallo
- Odúbel Herrera
- Derek Holland
- Keone Kela
- Michael Kirkman
- Gerald Laird
- Nomar Mazara
- Mike Olt
- Zach Phillips
- Edinson Vólquez
