= 1990 Texas Rangers season =

1990 Texas Rangers
- League: American League
- Division: West
- Ballpark: Arlington Stadium
- City: Arlington, Texas
- Record: 83–79 (.512)
- Divisional place: 3rd
- Owners: George W. Bush
- General managers: Tom Grieve
- Managers: Bobby Valentine
- Television: KTVT (Jim Sundberg, Steve Busby); HSE (Greg Lucas, Brad Sham, Dave Barnett, Jim Sundberg)
- Radio: WBAP (Eric Nadel, Mark Holtz)

The 1990 Texas Rangers season was the 30th of the Texas Rangers franchise overall, their 19th in Arlington as the Rangers, and the 19th season at Arlington Stadium. The Texas Rangers finished third in the American League West, with a record of 83 wins and 79 losses.

== Offseason ==
- October 2, 1989: Cecilio Guante was released by the Rangers.

== Regular season ==
- June 11, 1990: Nolan Ryan threw his sixth no-hitter against the Oakland Athletics.
- July 30, 1990: Nolan Ryan earned his 300th win against the Milwaukee Brewers.
- August 12, 1990: The Rangers and Chicago White Sox were involved in the longest rain delay in baseball history at 7 hours and 23 minutes at Comiskey Park. Behind the delay's length was the White Sox's insistence that the game be rescheduled at Comiskey four days later when both teams were idle and not at Arlington Stadium the subsequent weekend, which was rejected by the Rangers. The gamesmanship between the two sides resulted in the contest eventually played as part of a twi-night doubleheader at Arlington on August 17.

=== Season standings ===
AL West
Team	W	L	Pct.	GB	Home	Road
Oakland Athletics	103	59	.636	—	51‍–‍30	52‍–‍29
Chicago White Sox	94	68	.580	9	49‍–‍31	45‍–‍37
Texas Rangers	83	79	.512	20	47‍–‍35	36‍–‍44
California Angels	80	82	.494	23	42‍–‍39	38‍–‍43
Seattle Mariners	77	85	.475	26	38‍–‍43	39‍–‍42
Kansas City Royals	75	86	.466	27½	45‍–‍36	30‍–‍50
Minnesota Twins	74	88	.457	29	41‍–‍40	33‍–‍48

=== Record vs. opponents ===
1990 American League record Sources:
Team	BAL	BOS	CAL	CWS	CLE	DET	KC	MIL	MIN	NYY	OAK	SEA	TEX	TOR
Baltimore	—	4–9	7–5	6–6	6–7	6–7	8–3	7–6	6–6	6–7	4–8	3–9	8–4	5–8
Boston	9–4	—	7–5	6–6	9–4	8–5	4–8	5–8	4–8	9–4	4–8	8–4	5–7	10–3
California	5–7	5–7	—	5–8	7–5	5–7	7–6	7–5	9–4	6–6	4–9	5–8	8–5	7–5
Chicago	6–6	6–6	8–5	—	5–7	5–7	9–4	10–2	7–6	10–2	8–5	8–5	7–6	5–7
Cleveland	7–6	4–9	5–7	7–5	—	5–8	6–6	9–4	7–5	5–8	4–8	7–5	7–5	4–9
Detroit	7–6	5–8	7–5	7–5	8–5	—	5–7	3–10	6–6	7–6	6–6	7–5	6–6	5–8
Kansas City	3–8	8–4	6–7	4–9	6–6	7–5	—	4–8	8–5	8–4	4–9	7–6	5–8	5–7
Milwaukee	6–7	8–5	5–7	2–10	4–9	10–3	8–4	—	4–8	6–7	5–7	4–8	5–7	7–6
Minnesota	6–6	8–4	4–9	6–7	5–7	6–6	5–8	8–4	—	6–6	6–7	6–7	5–8	3–9
New York	7–6	4–9	6–6	2–10	8–5	6–7	4–8	7–6	6–6	—	0–12	9–3	3–9	5–8
Oakland	8–4	8–4	9–4	5–8	8–4	6–6	9–4	7–5	7–6	12–0	—	9–4	8–5	7–5
Seattle	9–3	4–8	8–5	5–8	5–7	5–7	6–7	8–4	7–6	3–9	4–9	—	7–6	6–6
Texas	4–8	7–5	5–8	6–7	5–7	6–6	8–5	7–5	8–5	9–3	5–8	6–7	—	7–5
Toronto	8–5	3–10	5–7	7–5	9–4	8–5	7–5	6–7	9–3	8–5	5–7	6–6	5–7	—

=== Notable transactions ===
- June 4, 1990: 1990 Major League Baseball draft
  - Dan Smith was drafted by the Rangers in the 1st round (16th pick).
  - Rusty Greer was drafted by the Rangers in the 10th round. Player signed June 5, 1990.
- June 14, 1990: Randy St. Claire was signed as a free agent by the Rangers.
- September 4, 1990: Randy St. Claire was released by the Rangers.

=== Nolan Ryan's 6th No-Hitter ===
- June 11, 1990: At Oakland Alameda County Coliseum, Nolan Ryan, at forty-three years, four months, and twelve days, became the oldest pitcher in major league history to throw a no-hitter. He would become the only pitcher in the history of Major League Baseball to throw a no-hitter for three different teams (the Angels, the Astros, the Rangers). Ryan would also hold the distinction of holding the record for longest time between two no-hitters. Ryan who tossed his fifth no-hitter on September 26, 1981, and this one on June 11.

=== Roster ===
1990 Texas Rangers
Roster
Pitchers: 48 Gerald Alexander; 28 Brad Arnsberg; 27 John Barfield; 44 Joe Bitker; 45 Brian Bohanon; 41 Kevin Brown; 43 Scott Chiamparino; 44 John Hoover; 49 Charlie Hough; 30 Mike Jeffcoat; 51 Ramón Mañón; 38 Craig McMurtry; 50 Gary Mielke; 39 Jamie Moyer; 37 Kenny Rogers; 40 Jeff Russell; 34 Nolan Ryan; 36 Bobby Witt	Catchers: 33 Bill Haselman; 7 Chad Kreuter; 12 Geno Petralli; 17 John Russell; 5 Mike Stanley; Infielders: 22 Steve Buechele; 42 Scott Coolbaugh; 14 Julio Franco; 57 Gary Green; 9 Jeff Huson; 20 Jeff Kunkel; 25 Rafael Palmeiro	Outfielders: 3 Harold Baines; 18 Kevin Belcher; 32 Thad Bosley; 8 Jack Daugherty; 6 Cecil Espy; 19 Juan González; 29 Pete Incaviglia; 24 Gary Pettis; 47 Kevin Reimer; 21 Rubén Sierra	Manager: 2 Bobby Valentine; Coaches: 11 Toby Harrah (First Base); 35 Tom House (Pitching); 15 Davey Lopes (Bench); 26 Dave Oliver (Third Base); 31 Tom Robson (Hitting)

== Player stats ==
= Indicates team leader

= Indicates league leader

=== Batting ===
==== Starters by position ====
Note: Pos = Position; G = Games played; AB = At bats; H = Hits; Avg. = Batting average; HR = Home runs; RBI = Runs batted in

Pos	Player	G	AB	H	Avg.	HR	RBI
C	Geno Petralli	133	325	83	.255	0	21
1B	Rafael Palmeiro	154	598	191	.319	14	89
2B	Julio Franco	157	582	172	.296	11	69
3B	Steve Buechele	91	251	54	.215	7	30
SS	Jeff Huson	145	396	95	.240	0	28
LF	Pete Incaviglia	153	529	123	.233	24	85
CF	Gary Pettis	136	423	101	.239	3	31
RF	Rubén Sierra	159	608	170	.280	16	96
DH	Harold Baines	103	321	93	.290	13	44

==== Other batters ====
Note: G = Games played, AB = At bats; H = Hits; Avg. = Batting average; HR = Home runs; RBI = Runs batted in

Player	G	AB	H	Avg.	HR	RBI
Jack Daugherty	125	310	93	.300	6	47
Jeff Kunkel	99	200	34	.170	3	17
Mike Stanley	103	189	47	.249	2	19
Scott Coolbaugh	67	180	36	.200	2	13
John Russell	68	128	35	.273	2	8
Kevin Reimer	64	100	26	.260	2	15
Juan González	25	90	26	.289	4	12
Gary Green	62	88	19	.216	0	8
Cecil Espy	52	71	9	.127	0	1
Thad Bosley	30	29	4	.138	1	3
Chad Kreuter	22	22	1	.045	0	2
Kevin Belcher	16	15	2	.133	0	0
Bill Haselman	7	13	2	.154	0	3

=== Pitching ===
= Indicates league leader

==== Starting pitchers ====
Note: G = Games pitched; IP = Innings pitched; W = Wins; L = Losses; ERA = Earned run average; SO = Strikeouts

Player	G	IP	W	L	ERA	SO
Bobby Witt	33	222.0	17	10	3.36	221
Charlie Hough	32	218.2	12	12	4.07	114
Nolan Ryan	30	204.0	13	9	3.44	232
Kevin Brown	26	180.0	12	10	3.60	88
Scott Chiamparino	6	37.2	1	2	2.63	19

==== Other pitchers ====
Note: G = Games pitched; IP = Innings pitched; W = Wins; L = Losses; ERA = Earned run average; SO = Strikeouts

Player	G	IP	W	L	ERA	SO
Mike Jeffcoat	44	110.2	5	6	4.47	58
Jamie Moyer	33	102.1	2	6	4.66	58
Brian Bohanon	11	34.0	0	3	6.62	15
Gerald Alexander	3	7.0	0	0	7.71	8

==== Relief pitchers ====
Note: G = Games pitched; W = Wins; L = Losses; SV = Saves; ERA = Earned run average; SO = Strikeouts

Player	G	W	L	SV	ERA	SO
Kenny Rogers	69	10	6	15	3.13	74
Brad Arnsberg	53	6	1	5	2.15	44
John Barfield	33	4	3	1	4.67	17
Gary Mielke	33	0	3	0	3.73	13
Jeff Russell	27	1	5	10	4.26	16
Craig McMurtry	23	0	3	0	4.32	14
Joe Bitker	5	0	0	0	3.00	6
John Hoover	2	0	0	0	11.57	0
Ramón Mañón	1	0	0	0	13.50	0

== Awards and honors ==
- Julio Franco, Silver Slugger Award
- Julio Franco – All-Star Game Most Valuable Player
- Rafael Palmeiro, American League Leader in Hits (191)
- Gary Pettis, OF, AL Gold Glove
- Nolan Ryan – American League Leader Strikeouts (232)

All-Star Game

- Julio Franco, second base, reserve

== Farm system ==
Level	Team	League	Manager
AAA	Oklahoma City 89ers	American Association	Steve Smith
AA	Tulsa Drillers	Texas League	Tommy Thompson
A	Charlotte Rangers	Florida State League	Bobby Jones
A	Gastonia Rangers	South Atlantic League	Orlando Gómez
Rookie	GCL Rangers	Gulf Coast League	Chino Cadahia
Rookie	Butte Copper Kings	Pioneer League	Bump Wills
