= 1992 Texas Rangers season =

1992 Texas Rangers
- League: American League
- Division: West
- Ballpark: Arlington Stadium
- City: Arlington, Texas
- Record: 77–85 (.475)
- Divisional place: 4th
- Owners: George W. Bush
- General managers: Tom Grieve
- Managers: Bobby Valentine, Toby Harrah
- Television: KTVT (Jim Sundberg, Steve Busby); HSE (Greg Lucas, Norm Hitzges)
- Radio: WBAP (Eric Nadel, Mark Holtz); KXEB (Luis Mayoral, Mario Díaz Oroszo)

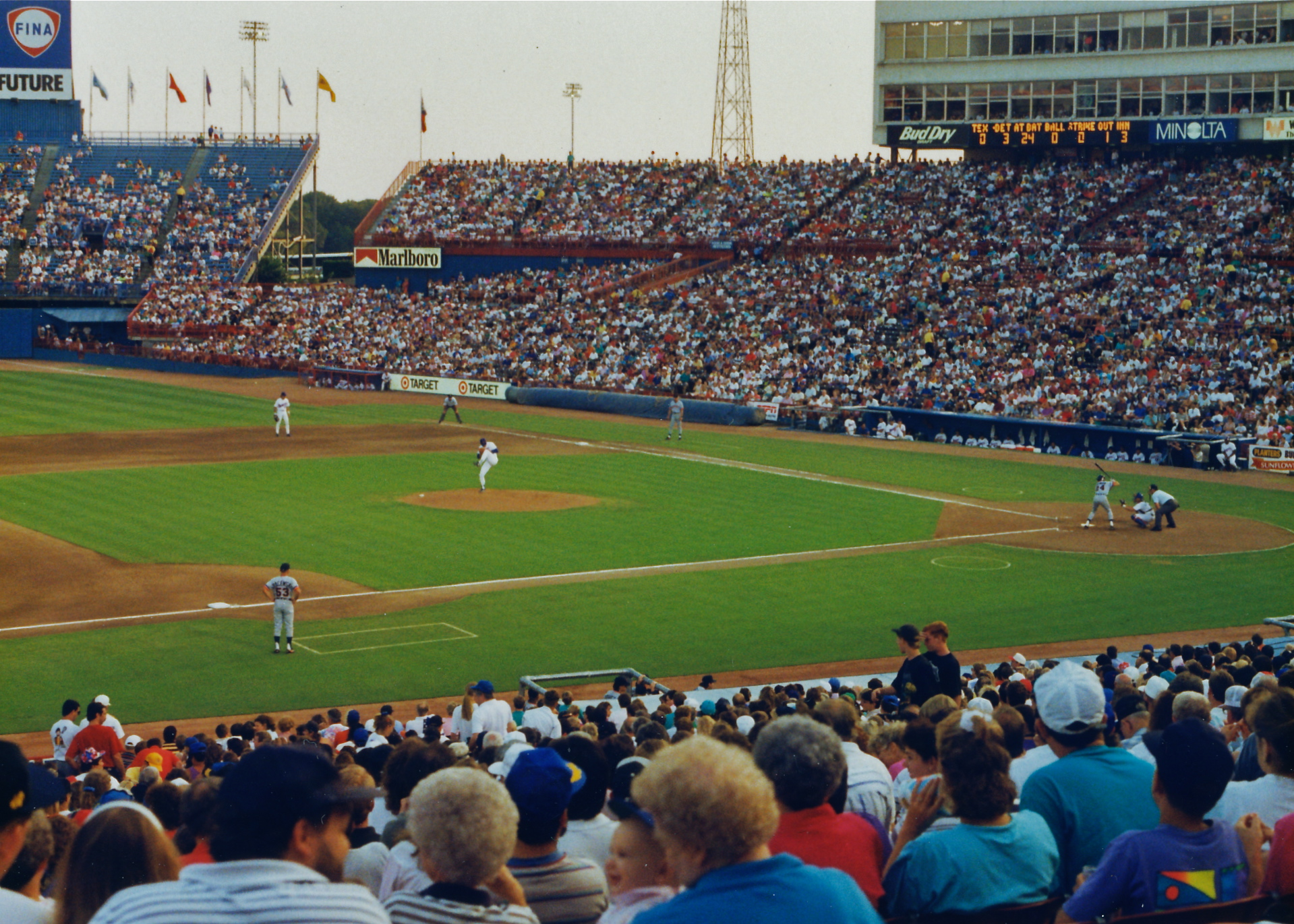
The Rangers playing host to the Detroit Tigers at Arlington Stadium during a 1992 regular season game.

The 1992 Texas Rangers season was the 32nd of the Texas Rangers franchise overall, their 21st in Arlington as the Rangers, and the 21st season at Arlington Stadium. The Rangers finished fourth in the American League West with a record of 77 wins and 85 losses.

== Offseason ==
- October 28, 1991: Steve Fireovid was signed as a free agent by the Rangers.
- December 7, 1991: Geno Petralli was signed as a free agent by the Rangers.
- January 3, 1992: Jeff Robinson was signed as a free agent by the Rangers.
- January 28, 1992: Mike Jeffcoat was signed as a free agent with the Texas Rangers.

== Regular season ==
=== Season standings ===
AL West
Team	W	L	Pct.	GB	Home	Road
Oakland Athletics	96	66	.593	—	51‍–‍30	45‍–‍36
Minnesota Twins	90	72	.556	6	48‍–‍33	42‍–‍39
Chicago White Sox	86	76	.531	10	50‍–‍32	36‍–‍44
Texas Rangers	77	85	.475	19	36‍–‍45	41‍–‍40
California Angels	72	90	.444	24	41‍–‍40	31‍–‍50
Kansas City Royals	72	90	.444	24	44‍–‍37	28‍–‍53
Seattle Mariners	64	98	.395	32	38‍–‍43	26‍–‍55

=== Record vs. opponents ===
1992 American League record Sources:
Team	BAL	BOS	CAL	CWS	CLE	DET	KC	MIL	MIN	NYY	OAK	SEA	TEX	TOR
Baltimore	—	8–5	8–4	6–6	7–6	10–3	8–4	6–7	6–6	5–8	6–6	7–5	7–5	5–8
Boston	5–8	—	8–4	6–6	6–7	4–9	7–5	5–8	3–9	7–6	5–7	6–6	4–8	7–6
California	4–8	4–8	—	3–10	6–6	7–5	8–5	5–7	2–11	7–5	5–8	7–6	9–4	5–7
Chicago	6–6	6–6	10–3	—	7–5	10–2	7–6	5–7	8–5	8–4	5–8	4–9	5–8	5–7
Cleveland	6–7	7–6	6–6	5–7	—	5–8	5–7	5–8	6–6	7–6	6–6	7–5	5–7	6–7
Detroit	3–10	9–4	5–7	2–10	8–5	—	7–5	5–8	3–9	5–8	6–6	9–3	8–4	5–8
Kansas City	4–8	5–7	5–8	6–7	7–5	5–7	—	7–5	6–7	5–7	4–9	7–6	6–7	5–7
Milwaukee	7–6	8–5	7–5	7–5	8–5	8–5	5–7	—	6–6	6–7	7–5	8–4	7–5	8–5
Minnesota	6–6	9–3	11–2	5–8	6–6	9–3	7–6	6–6	—	7–5	5–8	8–5	6–7	5–7
New York	8–5	6–7	5–7	4–8	6–7	8–5	7–5	7–6	5–7	—	6–6	6–6	6–6	2–11
Oakland	6–6	7–5	8–5	8–5	6–6	6–6	9–4	5–7	8–5	6–6	—	12–1	9–4	6–6
Seattle	5–7	6–6	6–7	9–4	5–7	3–9	6–7	4–8	5–8	6–6	1–12	—	4–9	4–8
Texas	5–7	8–4	4–9	8–5	7–5	4–8	7–6	5–7	7–6	6–6	4–9	9–4	—	3–9
Toronto	8–5	6–7	7–5	7–5	7–6	8–5	7–5	5–8	7–5	11–2	6–6	8–4	9–3	—

=== Opening Day lineup ===
- Brian Downing
- Monty Fariss
- Juan González
- José Guzmán
- Al Newman
- Rafael Palmeiro
- Dean Palmer
- Iván Rodríguez
- Rubén Sierra
- Dickie Thon

=== Notable transactions ===
- April 3, 1992: Al Newman was signed as a free agent with the Texas Rangers.
- May 29, 1992: Bill Haselman was selected off waivers from the Rangers by the Seattle Mariners.
- June 10, 1992: Jeff Robinson was selected off waivers from the Rangers by the Pittsburgh Pirates.
- June 19, 1992: Mario Díaz was signed as a free agent with the Texas Rangers.
- July 9, 1992: Bobby Valentine is fired after seven years as manager. Coach Toby Harrah is named as interim manager. The firing is announced by managing general partner of the Rangers, George W. Bush.
- August 31, 1992: Rubén Sierra, Jeff Russell, Bobby Witt, and cash were traded by the Rangers to the Oakland Athletics for José Canseco.

=== Roster ===
1992 Texas Rangers
Roster
Pitchers: 48 Gerald Alexander; 17 Floyd Bannister; 45 Brian Bohanon; 41 Kevin Brown; 28 Todd Burns; 24 Mike Campbell; 18 Don Carman; 43 Scott Chiamparino; 29 Steve Fireovid; 23 José Guzmán; 30 Mike Jeffcoat; 49 Danilo León; 44 Barry Manuel; 38 Terry Mathews; 46 Lance McCullers; 29 Edwin Núñez; 59 Roger Pavlik; 37 Kenny Rogers; 52 Wayne Rosenthal; 40 Jeff Russell; 34 Nolan Ryan; 42 Dan Smith; 46 Matt Whiteside; 36 Bobby Witt	Catchers: 66 Doug Davis; 20 Russ McGinnis; 12 Geno Petralli; 7 Iván Rodríguez; 3,17 John Russell; 24 Ray Stephens; Infielders: 54 Cris Colon; 20 Mario Díaz; 14 Julio Franco; 1 Jeff Frye; 9 Jeff Huson; 39 Rob Maurer; 8 Al Newman; 25 Rafael Palmeiro; 16 Dean Palmer; 10 Dickie Thon	Outfielders: 15 John Cangelosi; 33 Jose Canseco; 22 Jack Daugherty; 4 Monty Fariss; 19 Juan González; 18 Donald Harris; 15 David Hulse; 53 Dan Peltier; 47 Kevin Reimer; 21 Rubén Sierra; Other batters: 5,55 Brian Downing	Manager: 11 Toby Harrah; 2 Bobby Valentine; Coaches: 50 Ray Burris (Bullpen); 13 Orlando Gómez (Bench); 11 Toby Harrah (Bench); 47 Perry Hill (First Base); 35 Tom House (Pitching); 26 Dave Oliver (Third Base); 31 Tom Robson (Hitting)

== Player stats ==
= Indicates team leader

= Indicates league leader

=== Batting ===
==== Starters by position ====
Note: Pos = Position; G = Games played; AB = At bats; H = Hits; Avg. = Batting average; HR = Home runs; RBI = Runs batted in

Pos	Player	G	AB	H	Avg.	HR	RBI
C	Iván Rodríguez	123	420	109	.260	8	37
1B	Rafael Palmeiro	159	608	163	.268	22	85
2B	Jeff Frye	67	199	51	.256	1	12
3B	Dean Palmer	152	541	124	.229	26	72
SS	Dickie Thon	95	275	68	.247	4	37
LF	Kevin Reimer	148	494	132	.267	16	58
CF	Juan González	155	584	152	.260	43	109
RF	Rubén Sierra	124	500	139	.278	14	70
DH	Brian Downing	107	320	89	.278	10	39

==== Other batters ====
Note: G = Games played; AB = At bats; H = Hits; Avg. = Batting average; HR = Home runs; RBI = Runs batted in

Player	G	AB	H	Avg.	HR	RBI
Jeff Huson	123	318	83	.261	4	24
Al Newman	116	246	54	.220	0	12
Geno Petralli	94	192	38	.198	1	18
Monty Fariss	67	166	36	.217	3	21
Jack Daugherty	59	127	26	.205	0	9
Julio Franco	35	107	25	.234	2	8
David Hulse	32	92	28	.304	0	2
John Cangelosi	73	85	16	.188	1	6
José Canseco	22	73	17	.233	4	15
Cris Colón	14	36	6	.167	0	1
Russ McGinnis	14	33	8	.242	0	4
Donald Harris	24	33	6	.182	0	1
Mario Díaz	19	31	7	.226	0	1
Dan Peltier	12	24	4	.167	0	2
Ray Stephens	8	13	2	.154	0	0
John Russell	7	10	1	.100	0	2
Rob Maurer	8	9	2	.222	0	1
Doug Davis	1	1	1	1.000	0	0

=== Pitching ===
==== Starting pitchers ====
Note: G = Games pitched; IP = Innings pitched; W = Wins; L = Losses; ERA = Earned run average; SO = Strikeouts

Player	G	IP	W	L	ERA	SO
Kevin Brown	35	265.2	21	11	3.32	173
José Guzmán	33	224.0	16	11	3.66	179
Bobby Witt	25	161.1	9	13	4.46	100
Nolan Ryan	27	157.1	5	9	3.72	157
Roger Pavlik	13	62.0	4	4	4.21	45
Scott Chiamparino	4	25.1	0	4	3.55	13

==== Other pitchers ====
Note: G = Games pitched; IP = Innings pitched; W = Wins; L = Losses; ERA = Earned run average; SO = Strikeouts

Player	G	IP	W	L	ERA	SO
Todd Burns	35	103.0	3	5	3.84	55
Jeff Robinson	16	45.2	4	4	5.72	18
Brian Bohanon	18	45.2	1	1	6.31	29
Mike Jeffcoat	6	19.2	0	1	7.32	6
Dan Smith	4	14.1	0	3	5.02	5

==== Relief pitchers ====
Note: G = Games pitched; W = Wins; L = Losses; SV = Saves; ERA = Earned run average; SO = Strikeouts

Player	G	W	L	SV	ERA	SO
Jeff Russell	51	2	3	28	1.91	43
Kenny Rogers	81	3	6	6	3.09	70
Terry Mathews	40	2	4	0	5.95	26
Edwin Núñez	39	0	2	3	5.52	39
Floyd Bannister	36	1	1	0	6.32	30
Matt Whiteside	20	1	1	4	1.93	13
Danilo León	15	1	1	0	5.89	15
Wayne Rosenthal	6	0	0	0	7.71	1
Lance McCullers	5	1	0	0	5.40	3
Steve Fireovid	3	1	0	0	4.05	0
Barry Manuel	3	1	0	0	4.76	9
Gerald Alexander	3	1	0	0	27.00	1
Don Carman	2	0	0	0	7.71	2
Mike Campbell	1	0	1	0	9.82	2

== Awards and honors ==
- Juan González, A.L. Home Run Champion
- Juan González, Silver Slugger Award
- Iván Rodríguez, C, Gold Glove

All-Star Game

== Farm system ==
Level	Team	League	Manager
AAA	Oklahoma City 89ers	American Association	Tommy Thompson
AA	Tulsa Drillers	Texas League	Bobby Jones
A	Charlotte Rangers	Florida State League	Bump Wills
A	Gastonia Rangers	South Atlantic League	Walt Williams
Rookie	GCL Rangers	Gulf Coast League	Chino Cadahia
Rookie	Butte Copper Kings	Pioneer League	Vic Ramirez

LEAGUE CHAMPIONS: Oklahoma City
