= 1989 Texas Rangers season =

1989 Texas Rangers
- League: American League
- Division: West
- Ballpark: Arlington Stadium
- City: Arlington, Texas
- Record: 83–79 (.512)
- Divisional place: 4th
- Owners: George W. Bush
- General managers: Tom Grieve
- Managers: Bobby Valentine
- Television: KTVT (Bob Carpenter, Steve Busby); HSE (Greg Lucas, Norm Hitzges, Merle Harmon)
- Radio: WBAP (Eric Nadel, Mark Holtz )

The 1989 Texas Rangers season was the 29th of the Texas Rangers franchise overall, their 18th in Arlington as the Rangers, and the 18th season at Arlington Stadium. The Rangers finished fourth in the American League West with a record of 83 wins and 79 losses. Nolan Ryan would achieve his 5,000th career strikeout during the season. He would finish as the American League leader in strikeouts.

This season, the Rangers were sold to a new ownership group; the managing partner was future Governor of Texas and United States President George W. Bush.

== Offseason ==
- October 11, 1988: Guy Hoffman was released by the Rangers.
- December 5, 1988: Paul Kilgus, Mitch Williams, Curtis Wilkerson, Steve Wilson, Luis Benitez (minors) and Pablo Delgado (minors) were traded by the Rangers to the Chicago Cubs in exchange for Rafael Palmeiro, Jamie Moyer and Drew Hall.
- December 5, 1988: Bobby Meacham was traded by the New York Yankees to the Texas Rangers for Bob Brower.
- December 6, 1988: Pete O'Brien, Oddibe McDowell, and Jerry Browne were traded by the Rangers to the Cleveland Indians for Julio Franco.
- December 7, 1988: Nolan Ryan was signed as a free agent by the Rangers.
- January 6, 1989: Cecilio Guante was signed as a free agent by the Rangers.
- January 6, 1989: Jim Sundberg was signed as a free agent by the Rangers.
- January 23, 1989: Rick Leach was signed as a free agent by the Rangers.

== Regular season ==
- June 16, 1989: Sammy Sosa made his major league debut in a game against the New York Yankees. In four at-bats, Sosa appeared in 4 at-bats and had 2 hits.
- August 22, 1989: Against the eventual World Champion Oakland A's, Ryan became the first pitcher ever to record 5,000 career strikeouts. He struck out Rickey Henderson in the fifth inning to break the 5,000 barrier.
- September 12, 1989: Nolan Ryan threw 164 pitches before he was replaced on the mound by Kenny Rogers in the ninth inning. The Rangers lost the game, 6–5, to the Kansas City Royals.
- Rubén Sierra had a career year as he led the AL in triples and RBI but ranked 6th in home runs (29), third in runs scored (101) and 5th in hits (194). He set the club record for most total bases in a season (344), which also led the league.

=== Season standings ===
AL West
Team	W	L	Pct.	GB	Home	Road
Oakland Athletics	99	63	.611	—	54‍–‍27	45‍–‍36
Kansas City Royals	92	70	.568	7	55‍–‍26	37‍–‍44
California Angels	91	71	.562	8	52‍–‍29	39‍–‍42
Texas Rangers	83	79	.512	16	45‍–‍36	38‍–‍43
Minnesota Twins	80	82	.494	19	45‍–‍36	35‍–‍46
Seattle Mariners	73	89	.451	26	40‍–‍41	33‍–‍48
Chicago White Sox	69	92	.429	29½	35‍–‍45	34‍–‍47

=== Record vs. opponents ===
1989 American League record Sources:
Team	BAL	BOS	CAL	CWS	CLE	DET	KC	MIL	MIN	NYY	OAK	SEA	TEX	TOR
Baltimore	—	6–7	6–6	6–6	7–6	10–3	6–6	7–6	4–8	8–5	5–7	6–6	9–3	7–6
Boston	7–6	—	4–8	7–5	8–5	11–2	4–8	6–7	6–6	7–6	7–5	5–7	6–6	5–8
California	6–6	8–4	—	8–5	5–7	11–1	4–9	7–5	11–2	6–6	5–8	7–6	6–7	7–5
Chicago	6–6	5–7	5–8	—	7–5	4–8	6–7	10–2	5–8	5–6	5–8	7–6	3–10	1–11
Cleveland	6–7	5–8	7–5	5–7	—	5–8	8–4	3–10	5–7	9–4	2–10	6–6	7–5	5–8
Detroit	3–10	2–11	1–11	8–4	8–5	—	6–6	6–7	5–7	6–7	4–8	4–8	4–8	2–11
Kansas City	6–6	8–4	9–4	7–6	4–8	6–6	—	8–4	7–6	6–6	7–6	9–4	8–5	7–5
Milwaukee	6–7	7–6	5–7	2–10	10–3	7–6	4–8	—	9–3	8–5	5–7	7–5	5–7	6–7
Minnesota	8–4	6–6	2–11	8–5	7–5	7–5	6–7	3–9	—	6–6	6–7	7–6	5–8	9–3
New York	5–8	6–7	6–6	6–5	4–9	7–6	6–6	5–8	6–6	—	3–9	8–4	5–7	7–6
Oakland	7–5	5–7	8–5	8–5	10–2	8–4	6–7	7–5	7–6	9–3	—	9–4	8–5	7–5
Seattle	6–6	7–5	6–7	6–7	6–6	8–4	4–9	5–7	6–7	4–8	4–9	—	6–7	5–7
Texas	3–9	6–6	7–6	10–3	5–7	8–4	5–8	7–5	8–5	7–5	5–8	7–6	—	5–7
Toronto	6–7	8–5	5–7	11–1	8–5	11–2	5–7	7–6	3–9	6–7	5–7	7–5	7–5	—

=== Notable transactions ===
- July 29, 1989: Sammy Sosa, Wilson Álvarez, and Scott Fletcher were traded by the Rangers to the Chicago White Sox for Harold Baines and Fred Manrique.

=== Roster ===
1989 Texas Rangers
Roster
Pitchers: 24 Darrel Akerfelds; 43 Wilson Álvarez; 28 Brad Arnsberg; 27 John Barfield; 41 Kevin Brown; 51 Cecilio Guante; 44 Drew Hall; 49 Charlie Hough; 30 Mike Jeffcoat; 38 Craig McMurtry; 50 Gary Mielke; 39 Jamie Moyer; 37 Kenny Rogers; 40 Jeff Russell; 34 Nolan Ryan; 54 Paul Wilmet; 36 Bobby Witt	Catchers: 7 Chad Kreuter; 12 Geno Petralli; 5 Mike Stanley; 10 Jim Sundberg; Infielders: 25 Buddy Bell; 22 Steve Buechele; 42 Scott Coolbaugh; 8 Jack Daugherty; 1 Scott Fletcher; 14 Julio Franco; 20 Jeff Kunkel; 17 Fred Manrique; 3 Rafael Palmeiro; 16 Dean Palmer	Outfielders: 13 Harold Baines; 19,32 Thad Bosley; 6 Cecil Espy; 13,19 Juan González; 29 Pete Incaviglia; 9 Rick Leach; 21 Rubén Sierra; 17 Sammy Sosa; 19 Jeff Stone; Other batters: 47 Kevin Reimer	Manager: 2 Bobby Valentine; Coaches: 52 Dick Egan (Bullpen); 11 Toby Harrah (First Base); 35 Tom House (Pitching); 15 Davey Lopes (Bench); 26 Dave Oliver (Third Base); 31 Tom Robson (Hitting)

== Player stats ==
=== Batting ===
= Indicates team leader

==== Starters by position ====
Note: Pos = Position; G = Games played; AB = At bats; H = Hits; Avg. = Batting average; HR = Home runs; RBI = Runs batted in

Pos	Player	G	AB	H	Avg.	HR	RBI
C	Chad Kreuter	87	158	24	.152	5	9
1B	Rafael Palmeiro	156	559	154	.275	8	64
2B	Julio Franco	150	548	173	.316	13	92
3B	Steve Buechele	155	486	114	.235	16	59
SS	Scott Fletcher	83	314	75	.239	0	22
LF	Pete Incaviglia	133	453	107	.236	21	81
CF	Cecil Espy	142	275	122	.257	3	31
RF	Rubén Sierra	162	634	194	.306	29	119
DH	Harold Baines	50	172	49	.285	3	16

==== Other batters ====
Note: G = Games played; AB = At bats; H = Hits; Avg. = Batting average; HR = Home runs; RBI = Runs batted in

Player	G	AB	H	Avg.	HR	RBI
Jeff Kunkel	108	293	79	.270	8	29
Rick Leach	110	239	65	.272	1	23
Fred Manrique	54	191	55	.288	2	22
Geno Petralli	70	184	56	.304	4	23
Jim Sundberg	76	147	29	.197	2	8
Mike Stanley	67	122	30	.246	1	11
Jack Daugherty	52	106	32	.302	1	10
Sammy Sosa	25	84	20	.238	1	3
Buddy Bell	34	82	15	.183	0	3
Juan González	24	60	9	.150	1	7
Scott Coolbaugh	25	51	14	.275	2	7
Thad Bosley	37	40	9	.225	1	9
Jeff Stone	22	36	6	.167	0	5
Dean Palmer	16	19	2	.105	0	1
Kevin Reimer	3	5	0	.000	0	0

=== Pitching ===
= Indicates league leader

==== Starting pitchers ====
Note: G = Games pitched; IP = Innings pitched; W = Wins; L = Losses; ERA = Earned run average; SO = Strikeouts

Player	G	IP	W	L	ERA	SO
Nolan Ryan	32	239.1	16	10	3.20	301
Bobby Witt	31	194.1	12	13	5.14	166
Kevin Brown	28	191.0	12	9	3.35	104
Charlie Hough	30	182.0	10	13	4.35	94
Mike Jeffcoat	22	130.2	9	6	3.58	64
Jamie Moyer	15	76.0	4	9	4.86	44
Wilson Álvarez	1	0.0	0	1	inf	0

==== Other pitchers ====
Note: G = Games pitched; IP = Innings pitched; W = Wins; L = Losses; ERA = Earned run average; SO = Strikeouts

Player	G	IP	W	L	ERA	SO
John Barfield	4	11.2	0	1	6.17	9

==== Relief pitchers ====
Note: G = Games pitched; W = Wins; L = Losses; SV = Saves; ERA = Earned run average; SO = Strikeouts

Player	G	W	L	SV	ERA	SO
Jeff Russell	71	6	4	38	1.98	77
Kenny Rogers	73	3	4	2	2.93	63
Cecilio Guante	50	6	6	2	3.91	69
Gary Mielke	43	1	0	1	3.26	26
Drew Hall	38	2	1	0	3.70	45
Craig McMurtry	19	0	0	0	7.43	14
Brad Arnsberg	16	2	1	1	4.13	26
Darrel Akerfelds	6	0	1	0	3.27	9
Paul Wilmet	3	0	0	0	15.43	1
Jeff Kunkel	1	0	0	0	21.60	0

== Awards and honors ==
- Julio Franco, Silver Slugger Award, 1989
- Jeff Russell, Rolaids Relief Man of the Year Award 1989
- Nolan Ryan, American League Leader Strikeouts (301)
- Rubén Sierra, Silver Slugger Award, 1989
- Rubén Sierra, American League Leader, Triples (14)
- Rubén Sierra, American League Leader, RBI (119)
- Rubén Sierra, American League Leader, Total Bases (344)

All-Star Game

- Julio Franco, second baseman, starter
- Rubén Sierra, outfield, starter
- Nolan Ryan, pitcher, reserve
- Jeff Russell, relief pitcher, reserve

== Farm system ==
Level	Team	League	Manager
AAA	Oklahoma City 89ers	American Association	Jim Skaalen
AA	Tulsa Drillers	Texas League	Tommy Thompson
A	Charlotte Rangers	Florida State League	Bobby Jones
A	Gastonia Rangers	South Atlantic League	Orlando Gómez
Rookie	GCL Rangers	Gulf Coast League	Chino Cadahia
Rookie	Butte Copper Kings	Pioneer League	Bump Wills

LEAGUE CHAMPIONS: Charlotte
