= 1987 Texas Rangers season =

1987 Texas Rangers
- League: American League
- Division: West
- Ballpark: Arlington Stadium
- City: Arlington, Texas
- Record: 75–87 (.463)
- Divisional place: T–6th
- Owners: Eddie Chiles
- General managers: Tom Grieve
- Managers: Bobby Valentine
- Television: KTVT (Bob Carpenter, Steve Busby); HSE (Bob Carpenter, Norm Hitzges, Merle Harmon)
- Radio: WBAP (Eric Nadel, Mark Holtz )

The 1987 Texas Rangers season was the 27th of the Texas Rangers franchise overall, their 16th in Arlington as the Rangers, and the 16th season at Arlington Stadium. The Rangers finished sixth in the American League West with a record of 75 wins and 87 losses.

== Offseason ==
- December 18, 1986: Mike Jeffcoat was signed as a free agent with the Texas Rangers.

== Regular season ==
Rubén Sierra set the Rangers' club record for extra base hits (69) in one season. He became the youngest player in the American League to get 100 RBIs in a season since Al Kaline in 1956.

=== Season standings ===
AL West
Team	W	L	Pct.	GB	Home	Road
Minnesota Twins	85	77	.525	—	56‍–‍25	29‍–‍52
Kansas City Royals	83	79	.512	2	46‍–‍35	37‍–‍44
Oakland Athletics	81	81	.500	4	42‍–‍39	39‍–‍42
Seattle Mariners	78	84	.481	7	40‍–‍41	38‍–‍43
Chicago White Sox	77	85	.475	8	38‍–‍43	39‍–‍42
Texas Rangers	75	87	.463	10	43‍–‍38	32‍–‍49
California Angels	75	87	.463	10	38‍–‍43	37‍–‍44

=== Record vs. opponents ===
1987 American League record Sources:
Team	BAL	BOS	CAL	CWS	CLE	DET	KC	MIL	MIN	NYY	OAK	SEA	TEX	TOR
Baltimore	—	1–12	9–3	8–4	7–6	4–9	9–3	2–11	5–7	3–10	7–5	4–8	7–5	1–12
Boston	12–1	—	4–8	3–9	7–6	2–11	6–6	6–7	7–5	7–6	4–8	7–5	7–5	6–7
California	3–9	8–4	—	8–5	7–5	3–9	5–8	7–5	8–5	3–9	6–7	7–6	5–8	5–7
Chicago	4–8	9–3	5–8	—	7–5	3–9	6–7	6–6	6–7	5–7	9–4	6–7	7–6	4–8
Cleveland	6–7	6–7	5–7	5–7	—	4–9	6–6	4–9	3–9	6–7	4–8	5–7	2–10	5–8
Detroit	9–4	11–2	9–3	9–3	9–4	—	5–7	6–7	8–4	5–8	5–7	7–5	8–4	7–6
Kansas City	3–9	6–6	8–5	7–6	6–6	7–5	—	4–8	8–5	5–7	5–8	9–4	7–6	8–4
Milwaukee	11–2	7–6	5–7	6–6	9–4	7–6	8–4	—	3–9	7–6	6–6	4–8	9–3	9–4
Minnesota	7–5	5–7	5–8	7–6	9–3	4–8	5–8	9–3	—	6–6	10–3	9–4	6–7	3–9
New York	10–3	6–7	9–3	7–5	7–6	8–5	7–5	6–7	6–6	—	5–7	7–5	5–7	6–7
Oakland	5–7	8–4	7–6	4–9	8–4	7–5	8–5	6–6	3–10	7–5	—	5–8	6–7	7–5
Seattle	8–4	5–7	6–7	7–6	7–5	5–7	4–9	8–4	4–9	5–7	8–5	—	9–4	2–10
Texas	5–7	5–7	8–5	6–7	10–2	4–8	6–7	3–9	7–6	7–5	7–6	4–9	—	3–9
Toronto	12–1	7–6	7–5	8–4	8–5	6–7	4–8	4–9	9–3	7–6	5–7	10–2	9–3	—

=== Transactions ===
- June 2, 1987: 1987 Major League Baseball draft
  - Bill Haselman was drafted by the Rangers in the first round (23rd pick).
  - Scott Coolbaugh was drafted by the Rangers in the third round. Player signed June 18, 1987.
  - Kevin Belcher was drafted by the Rangers in the sixth round.

=== Roster ===
1987 Texas Rangers roster
Roster
Pitchers: 48 Scott Anderson; 21,53 Ed Correa; 42 Keith Creel; 23 José Guzmán; 27 Greg Harris; 45 Dwayne Henry; 49 Charlie Hough; 57 Steve Howe; 30 Mike Jeffcoat; 39 Paul Kilgus; 46 Mike Loynd; 16 Bob Malloy; 16 Mike Mason; 38 Ron Meridith; 50 Gary Mielke; 34 Dale Mohorcic; 40 Jeff Russell; 28 Mitch Williams; 36 Bobby Witt	Catchers: 12 Geno Petralli; 17 Darrell Porter; 4 Don Slaught; 5 Mike Stanley; Infielders: 8 Jerry Browne; 22 Steve Buechele; 1 Scott Fletcher; 20 Jeff Kunkel; 9 Pete O'Brien; 41 Tom O'Malley; 44 Tom Paciorek; 15 Larry Parrish; 3 Greg Tabor; 19 Curtis Wilkerson	Outfielders: 33 Bob Brower; 18 Cecil Espy; 29 Pete Incaviglia; 0 Oddibe McDowell; 51 Dave Meier; 3,21 Rubén Sierra	Manager: 2 Bobby Valentine; Coaches: 13 Joe Ferguson; 14 Tim Foli; 35 Tom House; 10 Art Howe; 31 Tom Robson

== Player stats ==
=== Batting ===
==== Starters by position ====
Note: Pos = Position; G = Games played; AB = At bats; H = Hits; Avg. = Batting average; HR = Home runs; RBI = Runs batted in

Pos	Player	G	AB	H	Avg.	HR	RBI
C	Don Slaught	95	237	53	.224	8	16
1B	Pete O'Brien	159	569	163	.286	23	88
2B	Jerry Browne	132	454	123	.271	1	38
3B	Steve Buechele	136	363	86	.237	13	50
SS	Scott Fletcher	156	588	169	.287	5	63
LF	Pete Incaviglia	139	509	138	.271	27	80
CF	Oddibe McDowell	128	407	98	.241	14	52
RF	Rubén Sierra	158	643	169	.263	30	109
DH	Larry Parrish	152	557	149	.268	32	100

==== Other batters ====
Note: G = Games played; AB = At bats; H = Hits; Avg. = Batting average; HR = Home Runs; RBI = Runs batted in

Player	G	AB	H	Avg.	HR	RBI
Bob Brower	127	303	79	.261	14	46
Mike Stanley	78	216	59	.273	6	37
Geno Petralli	101	202	61	.302	7	31
Curtis Wilkerson	85	138	37	.268	2	14
Darrell Porter	85	130	31	.238	7	21
Tom O'Malley	45	117	32	.274	1	12
Tom Paciorek	27	60	17	.283	3	12
Jeff Kunkel	15	32	7	.219	1	2
Dave Meier	13	21	6	.286	0	0
Greg Tabor	9	9	1	.111	0	1
Cecil Espy	14	8	0	.000	0	0

=== Pitching ===
==== Starting pitchers ====
Note: G = Games pitched; IP = Innings pitched; W = Wins; L = Losses; ERA = Earned run average; SO = Strikeouts

Player	G	IP	W	L	ERA	SO
Charlie Hough	40	285.1	18	13	3.79	223
José Guzmán	37	208.1	14	14	4.67	143
Bobby Witt	26	143.0	8	10	4.91	160
Ed Correa	15	70.0	3	5	7.59	61
Bob Malloy	2	11.0	0	0	6.55	8
Mike Jeffcoat	2	7.0	0	1	12.86	1

==== Other pitchers ====
Note: G = Games pitched; IP = Innings pitched; W = Wins; L = Losses; ERA = Earned run average; SO = Strikeouts

Player	G	IP	W	L	ERA	SO
Greg A. Harris	42	140.2	5	10	4.86	106
Paul Kilgus	25	89.1	2	7	4.13	42
Mike Loynd	26	69.1	1	5	6.10	48
Mike Mason	8	29.0	0	2	5.59	21

==== Relief pitchers ====
Note: G = Games pitched; W = Wins; L = Losses; SV = Saves; ERA = Earned run average; SO = Strikeouts

Player	G	W	L	SV	ERA	SO
Dale Mohorcic	74	7	6	16	2.99	48
Mitch Williams	85	8	6	6	3.23	129
Jeff Russell	52	5	4	3	4.44	56
Steve Howe	24	3	3	1	4.31	19
Ron Meridith	11	1	0	0	6.10	17
Scott Anderson	8	0	1	0	9.53	6
Keith Creel	6	0	0	0	4.66	5
Dwayne Henry	5	0	0	0	9.00	7
Gary Mielke	3	0	0	0	6.00	3

== Awards and honors ==
- Rubén Sierra, American League Leader At-Bats (643)

All-Star Game

== Farm system ==
Level	Team	League	Manager
AAA	Oklahoma City 89ers	American Association	Toby Harrah
AA	Tulsa Drillers	Texas League	Bill Stearns
A	Charlotte Rangers	Florida State League	Jim Skaalen
A	Gastonia Rangers	South Atlantic League	Chino Cadahia
Rookie	GCL Rangers	Gulf Coast League	Stan Hough
