= Louisiana Tech Bulldogs baseball =

Louisiana Tech Bulldogs
- 2026 Louisiana Tech Bulldogs baseball team
- Founded: 1894; 132 years ago
- University: Louisiana Tech University
- Head coach: Lane Burroughs (10th season)
- Conference: Sun Belt
- Location: Ruston, Louisiana
- Home stadium: J. C. Love Field at Pat Patterson Park (capacity: 2,100)
- Nickname: Bulldogs
- Colors: Blue and red

NCAA tournament appearances
- 1971, 1974, 1975, 1978, 1980, 1986, 1987, 2016, 2021, 2022, 2024

Conference tournament champions
- Southland: 1975, 1980, 1987; C-USA: 2022

Conference regular season champions
- 1910, 1921; SIAA: 1938, 1939; LIC: 1941, 1945, 1946, 1947, 1948; Gulf States: 1954, 1958, 1959, 1960, 1961, 1971; Southland: 1974, 1975, 1978, 1980, 1986, 1987; C-USA: 2024

Conference division regular season champions
- Sun Belt West: 1992; C-USA West: 2021

The Louisiana Tech Bulldogs baseball team represents Louisiana Tech University in NCAA Division I college baseball. The Louisiana Tech baseball team participates in the Sun Belt Conference. The Bulldogs play their home games on campus at J. C. Love Field at Pat Patterson Park.

== History ==
=== Conference affiliations ===
- 1940–1948: Louisiana Intercollegiate Conference
- 1949–1971: Gulf States Conference
- 1972–1987: Southland Conference
- 1988–1991: American South Conference
- 1992–2001: Sun Belt Conference
- 2002–2013: Western Athletic Conference
- 2014–2026: Conference USA
- 2027–present: Sun Belt Conference

== Championships ==
=== Conference regular season championships ===
Season	Conference	Conference record
1910	Louisiana Intercollegiate Athletic Association	N/A
1921	Louisiana Intercollegiate Athletic Association	N/A
1938	Southern Intercollegiate Athletic Association	N/A
1939	Southern Intercollegiate Athletic Association	N/A
1941	Louisiana Intercollegiate Conference	N/A
1945	Louisiana Intercollegiate Conference	3–1
1946	Louisiana Intercollegiate Conference	4–0
1947	Louisiana Intercollegiate Conference	12–2
1948	Louisiana Intercollegiate Conference	13–1
1954	Gulf States Conference	4–3
1958	Gulf States Conference	9–4
1959	Gulf States Conference	12–3
1960	Gulf States Conference	9–4
1961	Gulf States Conference	15–4
1971	Gulf States Conference	16–8
1974	Southland Conference	11–4
1975	Southland Conference	10–5
1978	Southland Conference	16–4
1980	Southland Conference	10–3
1986	Southland Conference	13–5
1987	Southland Conference	12–4
2024	Conference USA	18–6

=== Conference division championships ===
Season	Conference	Division	Conference record
1980	Southland Conference	North	10–3
1982	Southland Conference	North	7–5
1987	Southland Conference	East	12–4
1992	Sun Belt Conference	West	15–5
2021	Conference USA	West	22–8

=== Conference championship series championships ===
Season	Conference	Opponent	Series record
1975	Southland Conference	Lamar	3–1
1980	Southland Conference	Lamar	4–1
1982	Southland Conference	Lamar	3–0
1987	Southland Conference	Lamar	3–1

=== Conference tournament championships ===
Season	Conference
2022	Conference USA

=== NCAA Regional results ===
Year	Record	Regional	Results
1971	3–2	Mideast Regional	Won 9–2 vs. UT Martin; Lost 0–4 vs. SIU Edwardsville; Won 3–2 at Marietta; Won 8–5 vs. UT Martin; Lost 0–3 vs. Central Michigan
1974	2–2	District 6 at Arlington	Won 3–2 vs. Pan American; Won 5–4 vs. Texas; Lost 0–8 vs. Texas; Lost 2–12 vs. Texas
1975	0–2	South Central Regional at Arlington	Lost 2–6 vs. Texas; Lost 1–8 vs. Pan American
1978	0–2	South Central Regional at Arlington	Lost 0–7 vs. Pan American; Lost 5–6 vs. Mississippi State
1980	1–2	Central Regional at Austin	Won 4–3 at Texas; Lost 1–2 vs. Hawaii; Lost 6–7 at Texas
1986	2–2	South I Regional at Baton Rouge	Won 7–5 vs. Tulane; Won 14–6 vs. Jackson State; Lost 4–7 at LSU; Lost 4–9 vs. Tulane
1987	1–2	South II Regional at New Orleans	Lost 5–19 at New Orleans; Won 5–2 vs. Southern; Lost 0–11 vs. Cal State Fullerton
2016	2–2	Starkville Regional	Lost 0–1 vs. Cal State Fullerton; Won 9–4 vs. Southeast Missouri; Won 6–2 vs. Cal State Fullerton; Lost 0–4 at Mississippi State
2021	2–2	Ruston Regional	Won 18–2 vs. Rider; Lost 3–8 vs. NC State; Won 10–8 vs. Alabama; Lost 7–14 vs. NC State
2022	1–2	Austin Regional	Won 12–5 vs. Dallas Baptist; Lost 2–5 at Texas; Lost 7–9 vs. Air Force
2024	0–2	Fayetteville Regional	Lost 4–19 vs. Kansas State; Lost 3–9 vs. Southeast Missouri State
Total	14–22		

== Head coaches ==
=== Head coaching records ===
#	Name	Years	Seasons	Games	Wins	Losses	Ties	Win %
1	Harry Gwinner	1902	1	5	2	3	0	.400
	Unknown	1903	1	3	2	1	0	.667
	Unknown	1904–1906	3	0	0	0	0	–
2	Brown Rogers	1907	1	0	0	0	0	–
3	George L. Watkins	1908	1	0	0	0	0	–
	Unknown	1909	1	0	0	0	0	–
4	Percy S. Prince	1910	1	18	14	4	0	.778
	Unknown	1911–1912, 1920	3					–
5	R. Foster Clark	1921–1922	2	21	17	3	1	.833
6	William Henry Dietz	1923–1924	2	22	16	6	0	.727
7	John A. Wight	1925	1					–
8	R. C. Kenney	1926	1	22	17	5	0	.773
9	Hugh E. Wilson	1927	1	15	7	8	0	.467
10	Edward Sherling	1928	1	14	3	11	0	.214
11	Larry Fox	1929–1931, 1938	4	13	6	7	0	.462
	Unknown	1932–1933	2	19	7	12	0	.368
12	Eddie McLane	1934–1937	4	16	9	7	0	.563
13	Ray E. Davis	1939						–
14	George "Blue" Hogg	1939–1942						–
15	Berry Hinton	1945–1967	23	522	316	206	0	.605
16	Pat Patterson	1968–1990	23	1205	741	462	2	.616
17	Mike Kane	1991–1995	5	256	128	128	0	.500
18	Randy Davis	1996–1998	3	165	70	95	0	.424
19	Jeff Richardson	1999–2002	4	228	99	129	0	.434
20	Wade Simoneaux	2003–2014	12	668	297	370	1	.445
21	Greg Goff	2015–2016	2	114	67	47	0	.588
22	Lane Burroughs	2017–present	8	439	278	161	0	.633

=== Conference Coach of the Year ===
- Berry Hinton: 6 times
- Pat Patterson: 7 times
- Wade Simoneaux: 2007

== Players ==
=== Honors ===
WAC Player of the Year

- Brian Rike, 2007

Sun Belt Conference Player of the Year

- T. J. Soto, 1997

College World Series Home Run Derby Champion

- T. J. Soto, 2000

=== MLB draft ===
Louisiana Tech has had 74 Major League Baseball draft selections since the draft began in 1965.

Bulldogs Drafted in Major League Baseball
Year	Player	Round	Team
1966	George Stone	5	Braves
1971	Ronald Botica	2	Angels
1972	Fred McGaha	8	Cardinals
1974	Cecil Holman	9	Rangers
1975	Richard McAlister	17	Red Sox
1975	Randy McGilberry	14	Royals
1975	Steven Lacy	9	Royals
1976	Robert Brasher	23	Braves
1979	Jay Kibbe	26	Angels
1979	Dale Holman	6	Dodgers
1980	Mike Jeffcoat	13	Indians
1980	Keith Thibodeaux	3	Pirates
1981	Art Niemann	33	White Sox
1981	Rex Schimpf	23	Astros
1981	Jerry Lomastro	22	Twins
1982	Russell Rightmire	24	Blue Jays
1982	Thomas Krupa	15	Expos
1984	James Jagnow	30	Rangers
1984	Bob VanVuren	5	Royals
1985	Gregg Magistri	19	Red Sox
1985	James Boehne	17	Red Sox
1986	Charlie Montoyo	26	Brewers
1986	Jeff Richardson	7	Reds
1987	Pat Moore	25	Cardinals
1987	David Segui	18	Orioles
1987	Kevin Pickens	12	Royals
1987	Richie Leblanc	10	Royals
1987	Charlie Montoyo	6	Brewers
1988	Michael Galvan	22	White Sox
1990	Phil Hiatt	8	Royals
1990	Kevin McGehee	8	Giants
1992	Jeffrey Richey	41	Giants
1992	David Dark	38	Cubs
1993	Wes Hawkins	10	Orioles
1996	Tony Lawrence	5	Expos
1997	Tony Lawrence	4	Padres
1998	Matt Greer	26	Dodgers
1998	Tommy Bost	24	Indians
1999	Ben Hickman	9	Marlins
2000	T.J. Soto	31	Astros
2001	Lee Gwaltney	27	Cardinals
2002	Derek Brewster	28	Phillies
2002	Casey Blalock	27	Marlins
2002	Lee Gwaltney	6	Phillies
2003	Christopher Robinson	12	Astros
2004	Brad Chedister	37	Astros
2007	Dylan Moseley	50	Diamondbacks
2007	Brian Rike	2	Rockies
2008	Dylan Moseley	48	Cubs
2008	Alan Knotts	38	Pirates
2008	Adam Cobb	24	Rangers
2008	Jericho Jones	20	Cubs
2008	Albie Goulder	15	Dodgers
2008	Luke Burnett	14	Mariners
2009	Chris Kersten	33	Indians
2009	Kevin Winn	26	Padres
2010	Mike Jefferson	46	Mets
2011	Mark Threlkeld	25	Royals
2011	Mike Jefferson	22	Pirates
2011	Kyle Roliard	13	Rockies
2012	Jeb Stefan	22	Phillies
2012	Alex Williams	19	White Sox
2013	Taylor Terrasas	30	Reds
2013	Sam Alvis	21	Marlins
2013	Ryan Gebhardt	17	Diamondbacks
2015	Phil Maton	20	Padres
2016	Adam Atkins	18	Mets
2016	Braden Bristo	23	Yankees
2016	Phil Diehl	27	Yankees
2017	Raphael Gladu	16	Mets
2017	Nate Harris	21	Rockies
2017	Brent Díaz	29	Brewers
2019	David Leal	38	Athletics
2021	Parker Bates	9	Royals
2022	Ryan Jennings	4	Blue Jays
2022	Kyle Crigger	7	Marlins
2022	Taylor Young	8	Dodgers
2022	Cade Gibson	10	Marlins

=== Olympians ===
Name	Country	Olympiad	Event	Result
Mark Doubleday	Australia	Atlanta 1996	Baseball	7th

=== Former players ===
Name	Years in MLB	Years at Tech	Team(s)
Bill Bagwell	1923–1925		Braves, Athletics
Phil Diehl	2019–present		Rockies, Reds
Harley Boss	1928–1933		Senators, Indians
Atley Donald	1938–1945		Yankees
Chuck Finley	1986–2002		Angels, Indians, Cardinals
Tom Herrin	1954		Red Sox
Phil Hiatt	1993–2001		Royals, Tigers, Dodgers
Mike Jeffcoat	1983–1994		Indians, Giants, Rangers, Marlins
Bob Linton	1929		Pirates
Phil Maton	2017–present		Padres, Indians, Astros
Kevin McGehee	1993		Orioles
Randy McGilberry	1977–1978		Royals
Charlie Montoyo	1993		Expos
Brian Myrow	2005–2008		Dodgers, Padres
Rebel Oakes	1909–1915		Reds, Cardinals, Rebels
Jeff Richardson	1989–1993		Reds, Pirates, Red Sox
David Segui	1990–2004		Orioles, Mets, Expos, Mariners, Blue Jays, Rangers, Indians
Dave Short	1940–1941		White Sox
George Stone	1967–1975		Braves, Mets

Others:

- Jim Case
- Rick Huckabay
- David Lee
- Jackie Moreland
- Pat Patterson
- Scotty Robertson

== See also ==
- List of NCAA Division I baseball programs
