= Bob Malloy =

Bob Malloy may refer to:

- Bob Malloy (1940s pitcher) (1918–2007), baseball pitcher for the Cincinnati Reds and St. Louis Browns
- Bob Malloy (1980s pitcher) (born 1964), baseball pitcher for the Texas Rangers and Montreal Expos
