= Chiamparino =

Chiamparino is a surname. Notable people with the surname include:

- Scott Chiamparino (born 1966), American baseball player
- Sergio Chiamparino (born 1948), Italian politician
