= Scott Anderson (baseball) =

American baseball player (born 1962)

- Pitcher
- Born: August 1, 1962 (age 64); Corvallis, Oregon, U.S.
- Batted: Right Threw: Right

Professional debut
- MLB: April 8, 1987, for the Texas Rangers
- NPB: April 10, 1991, for the Chunichi Dragons

Last appearance
- NPB: October 3, 1992, for the Chunichi Dragons
- MLB: August 26, 1995, for the Kansas City Royals

MLB statistics
- Win–loss record: 1–2
- Earned run average: 5.43
- Strikeouts: 28

NPB statistics
- Win–loss record: 18–21
- Earned run average: 4.00
- Strikeouts: 172
- Stats at Baseball Reference

Teams
- Texas Rangers (1987); Montreal Expos (1990); Chunichi Dragons (1991–1992); Kansas City Royals (1995)

Scott Richard Anderson (born August 1, 1962) is an American former professional baseball pitcher. He played in Major League Baseball (MLB) for the Texas Rangers in 1987, the Montreal Expos in 1990, and the Kansas City Royals in 1995.

== High school and college career ==
Anderson played high school baseball at Newport High School in Bellevue, Washington. In 1980, he recorded 95 strikeouts, an earned run average (ERA) of only 0.69, and four shutouts. He was originally drafted in the 16th round of the 1980 Major League Baseball draft by the Oakland Athletics, but did not sign with them. He played four years of college baseball for Oregon State University.

== Professional career ==
He was drafted in the seventh round of the 1984 MLB draft by the Texas Rangers. After signing, he spent his first minor league season as a starting pitcher with the Burlington Rangers, where he pitched 14 games, finishing the season with a 3–6 record and an ERA of 2.50. He spent the 1985 season playing for the Tulsa Drillers, pitching 28 games and starting 27 of them. He posted a 9–6 record with a 3.67 ERA, two complete games and a shutout. He started the 1986 season as a relief pitcher playing for the Drillers. After ten games, where he earned five saves, he was promoted to the Oklahoma City 89ers. Anderson pitched in 48 games for the 89ers, finishing the season with a 5–7 record, a 2.96 ERA, and 15 saves. At the end of the 1986 season, he was added to the Rangers' Major League roster, and earned a spot in the bullpen by the end of spring training.

Anderson pitched his first game for the Rangers on April 8, 1987, against the Baltimore Orioles. In his debut, he relieved for Ed Correa in the sixth inning. He did not allow a hit in the sixth, but allowed a run and three hits in the seventh inning before being replaced on the mound by Dale Mohorcic. By the end of April he was sent back down to Oklahoma City, and spent the rest of the season in the minors. In nine games with the Rangers during the 1987 Texas Rangers season, Anderson pitched eight games and threw six strikeouts, posting an ERA of 9.53. After 49 relief appearances for the 89ers in 1987, Anderson went on to pitch in 38 more games in 1988, starting ten games.

On December 19, 1988, Anderson was traded to the Montreal Expos for Mike Berger, a minor league catcher. During the 1989 season, he played for the Indianapolis Indians, Montreal's AAA club. In 29 games (19 starts), he put up a 7–8 record with an ERA of 3.17. He spent most of 1990 with the Indians as well, pitching in 27 games, earning 12 wins, 10 losses, and an ERA of 3.31 A book, The 26th Man: One Minor League Pitcher's Pursuit of a Dream, chronicling the Indians season and the journey of its co-author, pitcher Steve Fireovid, was published in 1991 and features Anderson prominently. He did play four games for the Expos during the 1990 Montreal Expos season, pitching 18 innings and striking out 16. On November 1, 1990, Anderson was released from the Expos. From 1991 to 1992, he played for the Chunichi Dragons of Japan's Central League.

He returned to the United States and played in the Florida Marlins and Milwaukee Brewers farm systems. Anderson pitched his last Major League game for the Kansas City Royals on August 26, 1995. He pitched three innings of relief for Kevin Appier, allowing three hits and no runs in a 10–3 loss against the Texas Rangers, his former team.

Anderson played for the Philadelphia Phillies and retired in 2001.

== Coaching career ==
After retiring, Anderson became a pitching coach for the Australian national team. Later he became an instructor at Winning Inning in Clearwater Beach, Florida.
