= Pat Patterson (coach) =

- Born: James E. Patterson; March 26, 1934; Delhi, Louisiana, U.S.
- Died: October 11, 2007 (aged 73); Ruston, Louisiana, U.S.
- Resting place: Pines Memorial Cemetery in Ruston, Louisiana
- Education: Louisiana Tech University; University of Mississippi
- Occupation: Baseball coach at Louisiana Tech University
- Spouse: Glenda Bates Patterson
- Children: James A. "Tony" Patterson; Lee Ann Teer

James Edwin "Gravy" Patterson Jr., also known as Pat Patterson, (March 26, 1934 – October 11, 2007) was an American college baseball coach. He served as the head baseball coach at Louisiana Tech University in Ruston, Louisiana from 1968 to 1990, compiling a record of 741–462–2 record. Patterson produced 18 winning seasons in 23 years, and his teams won 40 or more games in five of those years. He was Southland Conference Coach of the Year seven times.

In retirement, he often returned as an interim coach. Seven of Patterson's players, including Mike Jeffcoat, Phil Hiatt, and David Segui, reached the majors.

In 2007, Patterson murdered his wife and then killed himself.

== Education ==
Patterson was born in Delhi in Richland Parish in northeastern Louisiana. He graduated from Louisiana Tech in 1958, playing football and baseball under legendary Bulldog coaches Joe Aillet and Berry Hinton. He earned four football letters and two baseball letters and went on to earn his master's degree from the University of Mississippi ("Ole Miss") in 1961.

== Coaching career ==
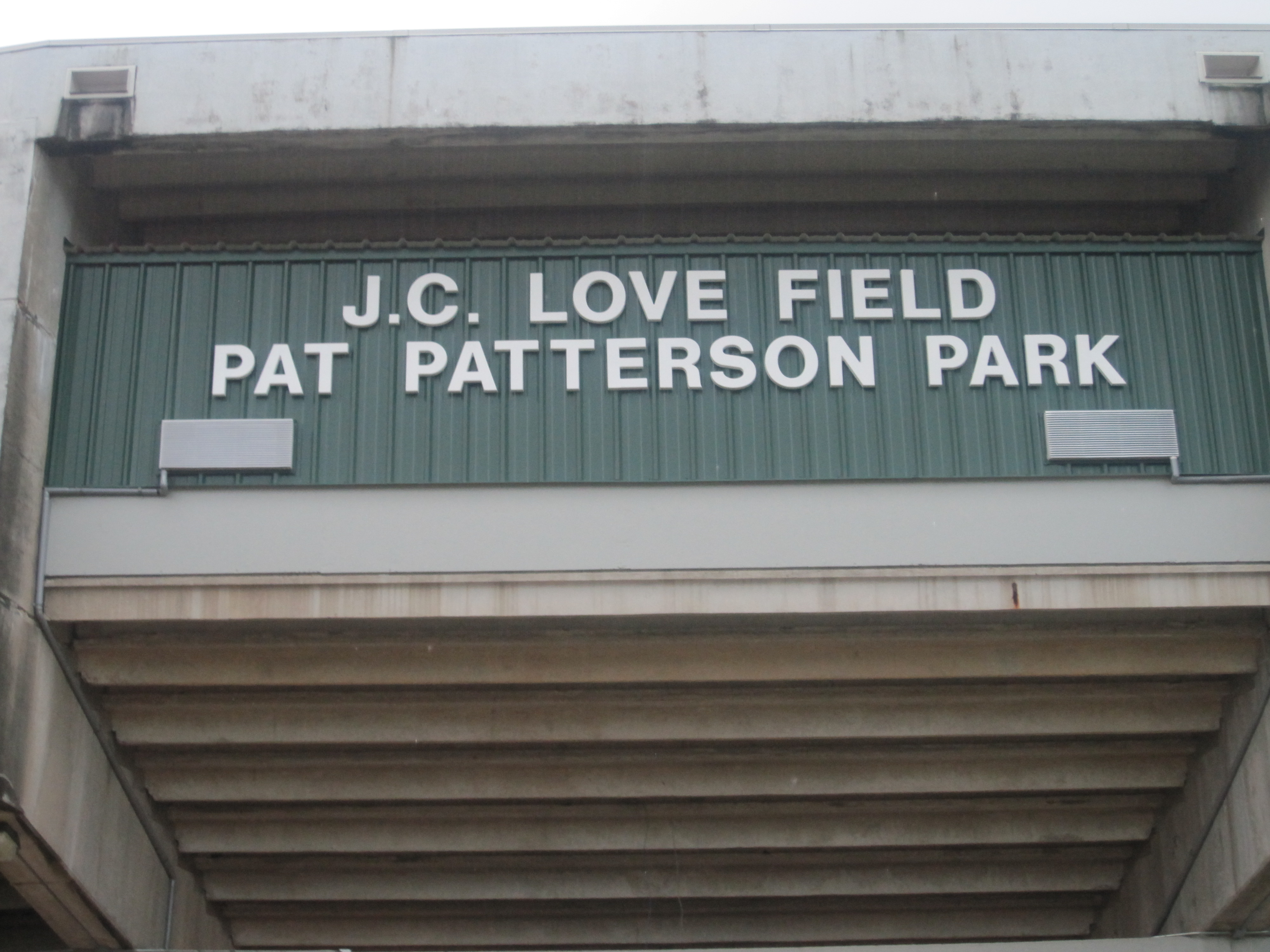
The Pat Patterson Park and J.C. Love Field for baseball at Louisiana Tech University

He began his coaching career in 1958 at Ouachita Parish High School in Monroe and took a job at C.E. Byrd High School in Shreveport in 1963 before he joined the Louisiana Tech athletic department in 1967 as an assistant football coach.

Patterson would serve as both assistant football- and head baseball coach at Tech from 1968 to 1978 and as head baseball coach only until 1990. He subsequently oversaw one more football game, having served as interim coach in 1979, when the Bulldogs posted a 13-10 win over local rival Northeast Louisiana University, now known as the University of Louisiana at Monroe, in his only game as head coach.

As head coach, Patterson was named the District VI Coach of the Year in 1974. He led Louisiana Tech to seven National Collegiate Athletic Association Tournament appearances during his coaching tenure, the last in 1987. In 1974, Patterson led the Bulldogs to within one game from the College World Series.

Patterson served for several years as Tech's associate athletic director following his retirement in 1990. In that capacity, he oversaw the eligibility of athletes and monitored NCAA compliance. On three occasions, he was asked to step in as the university's interim athletic director.

He is a member of the Louisiana Tech Athletic Hall of Fame. A large poster of Patterson hangs on the outfield wall of Louisiana Tech's baseball stadium.
