= Russ McGinnis =

American baseball player

- Catcher
- Born: June 18, 1963 (age 63); Coffeyville, Kansas, U.S.
- Batted: Right Threw: Right

MLB debut
- June 3, 1992, for the Texas Rangers

Last MLB appearance
- May 9, 1995, for the Kansas City Royals

MLB statistics
- Batting average: .211
- Hits: 8
- Doubles: 4
- Stats at Baseball Reference

Teams
- Texas Rangers (1992); Kansas City Royals (1995)

Russell Brent McGinnis (born June 18, 1963) is an American former professional baseball catcher who played for two seasons in Major League Baseball (MLB). He played in 14 games for the Texas Rangers in 1992 and three games for the Kansas City Royals in 1995.

== Amateur career ==
McGinnis attended Sooner High School in Bartlesville, Oklahoma.

He began his college baseball career with two seasons at Connors State College in Oklahoma. The Oklahoman said in 1982 that McGinnis was "expected" to be selected in the January phase of the Major League Baseball draft, but he was not.

McGinnis next played for the Oklahoma Sooners. In two seasons, he slashed .356/.439/.595 with 25 home runs and 109 runs batted in. He was twice named to the All-Big Eight Conference Team as a catcher.

== Professional career ==
McGinnis was selected by the Milwaukee Brewers in the 14th round of the 1985 Major League Baseball draft and assigned to the Helena Gold Sox to begin his professional career. After two seasons, McGinnis was unsatisfied with how slowly he was moving through Milwaukee's farm system and requested a trade. He was traded on June 29, 1987, to the Oakland Athletics for Bill Mooneyham.

During spring training in 1989, McGinnis dislocated his thumb and had to be reassigned to minor league camp. In 1990, he led the Triple-A Tacoma Tigers in walks and runs batted in. In December 1990, the Chicago Cubs selected McGinnis in the Rule 5 draft from the Brewers.

McGinnis was playing for the Iowa Cubs in April 1991 when, during a bench-clearing brawl against the Oklahoma City 89ers, he was handcuffed to a fence at All Sports Stadium by the Oklahoma City Police Department. He finished the season leading the team in home runs, runs batted in, on-base percentage and slugging percentage.

On June 3, 1992, the Texas Rangers placed Jack Daugherty on the disabled list and promoted McGinnis to the majors for the first time in his career. He made his major league debut that day against the New York Yankees at Arlington Stadium. He started at catcher and recorded a hit (off of Greg Cadaret) and a walk (off of John Habyan) in three plate appearances. He also threw out Kevin Maas attempting to steal second base. On June 28, the Rangers activated Iván Rodríguez from the disabled list and designated McGinnis for assignment. After returning to the minors, McGinnis suffered a broken toe. Nonetheless, McGinnis had a strong remainder of the season in the minors. When the rosters expanded in September 1992, the Rangers declined to call him up. McGinnis was upset enough with the Rangers for not promoting him that he signed with a minor league contract with the Kansas City Royals following the season.

McGinnis underwent arthroscopic knee surgery in late May or early June of 1994. In March 1995, he refused to play with replacement players during the ongoing strike. On April 25, the Royals added him to their major league roster. He went hitless in six plate appearances over three games and was waived on May 15 when MLB rosters were reduced from 28 to 25 players.

== Personal life ==
McGinnis went by his full first name, Russell, until college, where he was known as "Rusty McGinnis."

As of June 1991, McGinnis was married.
