= Kevin Belcher =

Kevin Belcher may refer to:

- Kevin Belcher (baseball) (born 1967), American baseball player
- Kevin Belcher (center) (1961–2003), American football player
- Kevin Belcher (offensive tackle) (1961–1997), American football player
