= 1996 American League Division Series =

Teams
Team (Wins)		Manager	Season
Baltimore Orioles (3)		Davey Johnson	88–74 (.543), GB: 4
Cleveland Indians (1)		Mike Hargrove	99–62 (.615), GA: 14 1/2
- Dates: October 1–5
- Television: ESPN (Games 1–3); ESPN2 (Game 4)
- TV announcers: Jon Miller, Dave Campbell (Games 1, 3–4), Kirby Puckett (Games 1, 3–4), and Joe Morgan (Game 2)
- Radio: CBS
- Radio announcers: Ernie Harwell and Rick Cerone
- Umpires: Games 1–2: Drew Coble, Greg Kosc, Tim Tschida, Tim Welke, John Shulock, Ted Hendry; Games 3–4: Jim Evans, Ken Kaiser, Durwood Merrill, Larry Young, Al Clark, Mark Johnson

Teams
Team (Wins)		Manager	Season
New York Yankees (3)		Joe Torre	92–70 (.568), GA: 4
Texas Rangers (1)		Johnny Oates	90–72 (.556), GA: 4 1/2
- Dates: October 1–5
- Television: NBC (Games 1, 3); Fox (Game 2); ESPN (Game 4)
- TV announcers: Bob Costas, Joe Morgan, and Bob Uecker (Games 1, 3); Thom Brennaman and Bob Brenly (Game 2); Chris Berman and Dave Campbell (Game 4)
- Radio: CBS
- Umpires: Games 1–2: Jim Evans, Ken Kaiser, Durwood Merrill, Larry Young, Al Clark, Mark Johnson; Games 3–4: Drew Coble, Greg Kosc, Tim Tschida, Tim Welke, John Shulock, Ted Hendry

The 1996 American League Division Series (ALDS), consisted of two best-of-five playoff series on the American League side in Major League Baseball's (MLB) 1996 postseason, began on Tuesday, October 1, and ended on Saturday, October 5, with the champions of the three AL divisions—along with a "wild card" team—participating in two series.

Under MLB's playoff format from 1995 to 1997, home field advantage was assigned to two of the three division champions on a rotating basis, regardless of record. The wild card team was then matched up against whichever of those two home-field division champions held the better record, unless it created an intradivisional matchup, as no two teams from the same division could be matched up in the Division Series, regardless of whether the format at the time would suggest such a matchup. Home field priority for division champions for the 1996 AL postseason was as follows: (1) Central, (2) West, (3) East. The matchups were:

- (1) Cleveland Indians (AL Central champions) vs. (4) Baltimore Orioles (Wild Card qualifier): Orioles won the series, 3–1.
- (2) Texas Rangers (AL West champions) vs. (3) New York Yankees (AL East champions): Yankees won the series, 3–1.

The team with home field "advantage" was required to play the first two games on the road, with potentially the last three at home, in order to reduce travel.

The Orioles and Yankees went on to meet in the AL Championship Series (ALCS). The Yankees became the American League champion, and defeated the National League champion Atlanta Braves in the 1996 World Series, the Yankees' first title since 1978.

== Matchups ==
=== Cleveland Indians vs. Baltimore Orioles ===
Baltimore won the series, 3–1.

Game	Date	Score	Location	Time	Attendance
1	October 1	Cleveland Indians – 4, Baltimore Orioles – 10	Oriole Park at Camden Yards	3:27	47,644
2	October 2	Cleveland Indians – 4, Baltimore Orioles – 7	Oriole Park at Camden Yards	3:27	48,970
3	October 4	Baltimore Orioles – 4, Cleveland Indians – 9	Jacobs Field	3:44	44,250
4	October 5	Baltimore Orioles – 4, Cleveland Indians – 3 (12)	Jacobs Field	4:41	44,280

=== Texas Rangers vs. New York Yankees ===
New York won the series, 3–1.

Game	Date	Score	Location	Time	Attendance
1	October 1	Texas Rangers – 6, New York Yankees – 2	Yankee Stadium (I)	2:50	57,205
2	October 2	Texas Rangers – 4, New York Yankees – 5 (12)	Yankee Stadium (I)	4:25	57,156
3	October 4	New York Yankees – 3, Texas Rangers – 2	The Ballpark in Arlington	3:09	50,860
4	October 5	New York Yankees – 6, Texas Rangers – 4	The Ballpark in Arlington	3:57	50,066

== Cleveland vs. Baltimore ==
=== Game 1 ===
October 1, 1996 1:07 pm (EDT) at Oriole Park at Camden Yards in Baltimore, Maryland 77 °F (25 °C), sunny
Team	1	2	3	4	5	6	7	8	9	R	H	E
Cleveland	0	1	0	2	0	0	1	0	0	4	10	0
Baltimore	1	1	2	0	0	5	1	0	X	10	12	1
WP: David Wells (1–0) LP: Charles Nagy (0–1); Home runs: CLE: Manny Ramírez (1); BAL: Brady Anderson (1), B. J. Surhoff 2 (2), Bobby Bonilla (1); Attendance: 47,644; Boxscore

It was Baltimore's first playoff game since the clinching Game 5 of the 1983 World Series. For the Indians, it was their second consecutive division title. Charles Nagy and David Wells matched each other, but in the wrong way. Brady Anderson's leadoff homer in the bottom of the first gave the Orioles a 1–0 lead. In the top of the second, Manny Ramírez led off with a home run of his own to tie the game. Then B. J. Surhoff's one-out home run gave the Orioles the lead back. In the third, after a leadoff single, the Orioles added two more runs on an RBI double by Rafael Palmeiro and an RBI single by Cal Ripken Jr., but after a single and double, Sandy Alomar Jr. singled home a run and Omar Vizquel followed with a sacrifice fly that made it a one-run game in the fourth. That made it 4–3 and the Orioles needed to put the game away. With one out in the sixth, the Orioles loaded the bases on a single and two walks and chased Nagy out of the game. His reliever, Alan Embree, made things worse for Cleveland. He allowed a sacrifice fly that made it 5–3, then hit Palmeiro. With the bases loaded, Bobby Bonilla got his only hit of the game: a grand slam off Paul Shuey, which made it 9–3 Orioles. In the seventh, Vizquel hit a ground-rule double and scored on Kenny Lofton's single, but the Orioles got that run back in the bottom of the inning on Surhoff's second home run of the game off Shuey. Four Baltimore relievers held the Indians scoreless over the last 2 2/3 innings as the Orioles took a 1–0 series lead with a 10–4 win.

=== Game 2 ===
October 2, 1996 1:44 pm (EDT) at Oriole Park at Camden Yards in Baltimore, Maryland 67 °F (19 °C), overcast
Team	1	2	3	4	5	6	7	8	9	R	H	E
Cleveland	0	0	0	0	0	3	0	1	0	4	8	2
Baltimore	1	0	0	0	3	0	0	3	X	7	9	0
WP: Armando Benítez (1–0) LP: Eric Plunk (0–1) Sv: Randy Myers (1); Home runs: CLE: Albert Belle (1); BAL: Brady Anderson (2); Attendance: 48,970; Boxscore

After a 37-minute rain delay, Game 2 commenced. Veterans Orel Hershiser of Cleveland and Scott Erickson of Baltimore met in this crucial game. In the bottom of the first, after two two-out walks, first baseman Kevin Seitzer's error on Bobby Bonilla's ground ball gave the Orioles the lead. In the bottom of the fifth, a Brady Anderson lead off home run made it 2–0 Orioles. After a two-out single and walk, a Cal Ripken Jr. single and Eddie Murray double scored a run each to make it 4–0, but the Indians rallied for three runs in the sixth. Kenny Lofton singled with one out, stole two bases, and scored on Seitzer's groundout. After a single, a two-run home run by Albert Belle made it a one-run game. In the eighth, the Indians loaded the bases on two singles off Jesse Orosco and walk off Armando Benitez before a misjudged fly ball by Brady Anderson from Julio Franco allowed them to tie the game at four, but, in the bottom of the eighth, the Orioles loaded the bases with no outs on a double and two walks off Eric Plunk, then a B.J. Surhoff groundout put them back atop 5–4 off Paul Assenmacher. A walk reloaded the bases before an Anderson sacrifice fly scored another run, then after another walk reloaded the bases, an RBI hit by Roberto Alomar off Julián Tavárez made it 7–4 Orioles. In the ninth, Randy Myers had a 1–2–3 inning for the save, giving Baltimore a 2–0 series lead heading to Cleveland.

=== Game 3 ===
October 4, 1996 4:08 pm (EDT) at Jacobs Field in Cleveland, Ohio 53 °F (12 °C), sunny
Team	1	2	3	4	5	6	7	8	9	R	H	E
Baltimore	0	1	0	3	0	0	0	0	0	4	8	2
Cleveland	1	2	0	1	0	0	4	1	X	9	10	0
WP: Paul Assenmacher (1–0) LP: Jesse Orosco (0–1); Home runs: BAL: B. J. Surhoff (3); CLE: Manny Ramírez (2), Albert Belle (2); Attendance: 44,250; Boxscore

Game 3 was critical with Cleveland facing elimination. Mike Mussina was sent to the mound against Jack McDowell to try to end the series in Cleveland. The Indians scored first when Kenny Lofton reached second on an error by Bobby Bonilla, stole third and scored on Kevin Seitzer's groundout. In the top of the second, the Orioles loaded the bases and forced home a run when McDowell hit Brady Anderson with a pitch, but a Manny Ramírez home run and an RBI double by José Vizcaíno after a single made it 3–1 in the bottom half. In the top of the fourth, B. J. Surhoff silenced the crowd with a towering three-run home run after two singles that gave the Orioles their first lead of the night. However, Kevin Seitzer would deliver the game-tying RBI single in the bottom of the fourth. The game would remain tied until the bottom of the seventh when the Indians loaded the bases on three walks off Jesse Orosco, then Albert Belle hit a grand slam off Armando Benitez to put the Indians back atop 8–4. They added another run on another RBI hit by Seitzer off Terry Mathews (the run charged to Arthur Rhodes) to ensure a Game 4.

=== Game 4 ===
October 5, 1996 1:07 pm (EDT) at Jacobs Field in Cleveland, Ohio 60 °F (16 °C), sunny
Team	1	2	3	4	5	6	7	8	9	10	11	12	R	H	E
Baltimore	0	2	0	0	0	0	0	0	1	0	0	1	4	14	1
Cleveland	0	0	0	2	1	0	0	0	0	0	0	0	3	7	1
WP: Armando Benítez (2–0) LP: José Mesa (0–1) Sv: Randy Myers (2); Home runs: BAL: Rafael Palmeiro (1), Bobby Bonilla (2), Roberto Alomar (1); CLE: None; Attendance: 44,280; Boxscore

Game 4 saw a rematch of Game 1: David Wells vs. Charles Nagy. In the top of the second, back-to-back home runs by Rafael Palmeiro and Bobby Bonilla gave the Orioles a 2–0 lead. Then, Sandy Alomar Jr.'s two-run single tied the game in the fourth. In the fifth, the Indians broke the tie with an RBI single by Omar Vizquel to score Jose Vizcaino, who singled and moved to second on a sacrifice bunt. The bats on both sides were then silenced until the top of the ninth inning, when José Mesa came on in a save situation and looked to extend the series to a deciding Game 5. However, after two one-out singles, Roberto Alomar's two-out RBI single tied the game. It looked like the Indians might win in the bottom half with two runners in scoring position and two out for Kenny Lofton, but he struck out to force extra innings. In the top of the 12th, the Orioles recaptured the lead when Roberto Alomar (who would play for Cleveland later in his career) hit the go-ahead home run. Randy Myers would finish off the Indians and send the Orioles to the 1996 American League Championship Series.

=== Composite box ===
1996 ALDS (3–1): Baltimore Orioles over Cleveland Indians

Team	1	2	3	4	5	6	7	8	9	10	11	12	R	H	E
Baltimore Orioles	2	4	2	3	3	5	1	3	1	0	0	1	25	43	4
Cleveland Indians	1	3	0	5	1	3	5	2	0	0	0	0	20	35	3
Total attendance: 185,144 Average attendance: 46,286

== Texas vs. New York ==
=== Game 1 ===
October 1, 1996 8:15 pm (EDT) at Yankee Stadium (I) in Bronx, New York 66 °F (19 °C), clear
Team	1	2	3	4	5	6	7	8	9	R	H	E
Texas	0	0	0	5	0	1	0	0	0	6	8	0
New York	1	0	0	1	0	0	0	0	0	2	10	0
WP: John Burkett (1–0) LP: David Cone (0–1); Home runs: TEX: Juan González (1), Dean Palmer (1); NYY: None; Attendance: 57,205; Boxscore

John Burkett took the mound for the Rangers in their first ever postseason game, facing David Cone. The Yankees would get a run in the first on a groundout by Bernie Williams with runners on second and third, but in the fourth, after a leadoff single and walk, Juan González's three-run home run gave the Rangers a 3–1 lead. After a single and strikeout, Dean Palmer's two-run home run made it 5–1. The Yankees would get a run in the bottom half when Tino Martinez doubled with one out and scored on Mariano Duncan's RBI single but no more. The Rangers added an insurance run in the sixth on Mark McLemore's RBI single. Burkett would go the distance for the win. He would allow only two runs despite giving up ten hits.

The Rangers' win in Game 1 was their first postseason win in franchise history. They proceeded to lose the rest of the series to the Yankees, and did not win another postseason game until their pennant season of 2010, when they won Game 1 of the ALDS.

=== Game 2 ===
October 2, 1996 8:05 pm (EDT) at Yankee Stadium in Bronx, New York 67 °F (19 °C), clear
Team	1	2	3	4	5	6	7	8	9	10	11	12	R	H	E
Texas	0	1	3	0	0	0	0	0	0	0	0	0	4	8	1
New York	0	1	0	1	0	0	1	1	0	0	0	1	5	8	0
WP: Brian Boehringer (1–0) LP: Mike Stanton (0–1); Home runs: TEX: Juan González 2 (3); NYY: Cecil Fielder (1); Attendance: 57,156; Boxscore

Game 2 proved memorable as Ken Hill faced 21-game winner Andy Pettitte. In the top of the second, innings Juan González's second home run of the series gave the Rangers a 1–0 edge, but two walks and a groundout allowed the Yankees to tie the game in the bottom half on Jim Leyritz's forceout. In the third innings, González hit his third homer of the series, this time a towering three-run home run, to give the Rangers a 4–1 lead, but the Yankees spent the next six innings chipping away at the lead. Cecil Fielder's home run in the fourth innings made it a two-run game. In the seventh, innings Charlie Hayes lifted a sacrifice fly off Dennis Cook to make it a one-run game, the run charged to Hill. In the eighth inning, the Yankees were five outs away from losing when Fielder tied the game with an RBI single to score Bernie Williams, who had the singled to lead off and moved to second on a fly out. The game moved to extra innings and the Rangers blew scoring opportunities in the tenth, eleventh, and twelfth innings. They put their leadoff men on but get nothing. In the 12th inning, the Yankees put their first two men on off Mike Stanton when Hayes laid down a sacrifice bunt off Mike Henneman, but Dean Palmer made an error on that bunt down the third base line and Jeter managed to score all the way from second base, allowing the Yankees to walk off in dramatic fashion.

=== Game 3 ===
October 4, 1996 7:07 pm (CDT) at The Ballpark in Arlington in Arlington, Texas 72 °F (22 °C), clear
Team	1	2	3	4	5	6	7	8	9	R	H	E
New York	1	0	0	0	0	0	0	0	2	3	7	1
Texas	0	0	0	1	1	0	0	0	0	2	6	1
WP: Jeff Nelson (1–0) LP: Darren Oliver (0–1) Sv: John Wetteland (1); Home runs: NYY: Bernie Williams (1); TEX: Juan González (4); Attendance: 50,860; Boxscore

Game 3 saw Jimmy Key face Darren Oliver. In the first, Oliver gave up a homer to Bernie Williams. That was all the Yankees could muster as Oliver began to settle in. In the bottom of the fourth inning, Juan González's fourth home run in three games tied the game and earned him the reputation of "Señor October." Then in the fifth inning, Kevin Elster walked, stole second and scored on Iván Rodríguez's RBI double to give the Rangers a 2–1 edge. Oliver, along with the Rangers' bullpen, kept the Yankees scoreless until the ninth. After two leadoff singles off Oliver, Williams' sac fly off Mike Henneman to tie the game and after a groundout and intentional walk, Mariano Duncan's RBI single put the Yankees up 3–2. In the ninth inning the Rangers' Mickey Tettleton walked. His pinch-runner, Damon Buford would advance to third on a sacrifice bunt by Mark McLemore and a groundout from pinch hitter Warren Newson. That put Buford 90 feet away and the winning run at the plate, but John Wetteland got Darryl Hamilton to strike out to end the game.

=== Game 4 ===
October 5, 1996 12:08 pm (CDT) at The Ballpark in Arlington, Arlington, Texas 77 °F (25 °C), overcast
Team	1	2	3	4	5	6	7	8	9	R	H	E
New York	0	0	0	3	1	0	1	0	1	6	12	1
Texas	0	2	2	0	0	0	0	0	0	4	9	0
WP: David Weathers (1–0) LP: Roger Pavlik (0–1) Sv: John Wetteland (2); Home runs: NYY: Bernie Williams 2 (3); TEX: Juan González (5); Attendance: 50,066; Boxscore

Kenny Rogers faced Bobby Witt in the potential clincher. Rogers pitched a scoreless first but in the second the Rangers struck for two on RBI hits by Mickey Tettleton after a leadoff double and Iván Rodríguez two outs later after a single. In the third inning Rogers was replaced by Brian Boehringer. Juan González led off the inning with his fifth home run of the series to make it 3–0, then an error by Derek Jeter and the walk put two men on before the Mark McLemore's RBI single gave the Rangers a 4–0 lead, but, in the top of the fourth inning after a single, wild pitch and walk put runners on first and third with no outs, Cecil Fielder's RBI single put the Yankees on the board. One out later, Mariano Duncan's RBI single cut Texas's lead to 4–2 and knock Witt out of the game. After a Joe Girardi single loaded the bases off Danny Patterson, Jeter's RBI groundout made it a one-run game. In the fifth inning the Yankees tied the game at four when Bernie Williams hit a leadoff home run off Roger Pavlik. In the seventh inning, the Yankees completed a four-run comeback by taking the lead on Cecil Fielder's RBI single with two on. In the ninth inning, Williams once again provided insurance by win hitting his second home run of the game off Mike Stanton. That made it 6–4 Yankees. In the bottom half, the Rangers put the tying runs on against John Wetteland, but he got Will Clark and Dean Palmer, both potential home run threats, to fly out and strike out to end the game and the series.

=== Composite box ===
1996 ALDS (3–1): New York Yankees over Texas Rangers

Team	1	2	3	4	5	6	7	8	9	10	11	12	R	H	E
New York Yankees	2	1	0	5	1	0	2	1	3	0	0	1	16	37	2
Texas Rangers	0	3	5	6	1	1	0	0	0	0	0	0	16	31	2
Total attendance: 215,287 Average attendance: 53,822
