= Greg Riddoch =

American baseball player, coach, and manager

- Infielder / Manager / Coach
- Born: July 17, 1945 (age 80); Greeley, Colorado, U.S.
- Batted: Right Threw: Right

MLB debut
- July 12, 1990, for the San Diego Padres

Last MLB appearance
- September 22, 1992, for the San Diego Padres

MLB statistics
- Games managed: 394
- Win–loss record: 200–194
- Winning percentage: .508

Teams
- As manager: San Diego Padres (1990–1992); As coach: San Diego Padres (1987–1990); Tampa Bay Devil Rays (1998–1999)

Gregory Lee Riddoch (born July 17, 1945) is an American former professional baseball player, manager and coach who served as the manager for the San Diego Padres of Major League Baseball (MLB) from 1990 to 1992, compiling a career win–loss record of 200–194 (.508).

Riddoch threw and batted right-handed, stood 6 feet (1.8 m) tall and weighed 180 pounds (82 kg). He attended Colorado State University and the University of Northern Colorado, where he led all NCAA Division I players in home runs in 1967 with 17 in just 26 games. Riddoch was drafted in the third round of the secondary phase of the June 1967 amateur draft by the Cincinnati Reds' organization where he was an infielder for five seasons (1967–71). He spent 13 seasons as a minor league manager in the short-season Northwest League and the Rookie-level Pioneer League and became a coach for the Padres from 1987 until the 1990 All-Star break when he succeeded Jack McKeon as the San Diego manager. He led the Padres to winning seasons in both 1991 (84–78) and 1992 (78–72), but was fired in favor of Jim Riggleman by the Padres' general manager, Joe McIlvaine, with a dozen games left in the 1992 campaign. Riddoch's successor finished with a much lower winning percentage, .385 vs .508 than Riddoch.

During his baseball career, Riddoch also served as third base coach for the Tampa Bay Devil Rays (1998–99), director of minor league clubs for the Reds (1985–86) and director of player development of the Milwaukee Brewers (2000–02). He retired in 2010 following a four-year stint as manager for the Eugene Emeralds of Northwest League, then affiliated with the Padres. Earlier in his career, when the Emeralds were a Reds' farm team, Riddoch had managed them for six seasons (1975–76; 1978–81), for a total of ten years as manager in Eugene.

Riddoch was inducted into the Colorado Sports Hall of Fame in 2000. Former Padres' outfielder Tony Gywnn, one of the greatest hitters of his generation, called his former coach "one of the best teachers ever of the game."

Preceded by Franchise established Orlando Gómez	Tampa Bay Devil Rays third-base coach 1998 (through Aug. 31); 1999	Succeeded by Orlando Gómez; Billy Hatcher
