= Wade Simoneaux =

Playing career
- 1981: Central Florida CC
- 1982–1983: Nicholls State
- Position: Third baseman

Coaching career (HC unless noted)
- 1986–1989: Ascension Catholic HS
- 1989–1990: East Ascension HS (asst.)
- 1990–1995: Episcopal HS
- 1995–2002: Louisiana–Lafayette (asst.)
- 2003–2014: Louisiana Tech
- 2015–2026: West Monroe HS

Head coaching record
- Overall: 297–370–1

Accomplishments and honors

Awards
- National American Legion Coach of the Year (1991); WAC Coach of the Year (2007)

Wade Simoneaux is a former head coach of the Louisiana Tech Bulldogs baseball team. Before coming to Louisiana Tech for the 2003 season, he served as the hitting coach, recruiting coordinator, and infield coach for the Louisiana–Lafayette Ragin' Cajuns baseball team. He played third base for Nicholls State where he graduated in 1984. In 2014, Simoneaux moved to West Monroe High School in West Monroe, Louisiana.

== Head coaching record ==
Record table
Season	Team	Overall	Conference	Standing	Postseason
Louisiana Tech Bulldogs (Western Athletic Conference) (2003–2013)
2003	Louisiana Tech	18–34–1	10–20	6th	
2004	Louisiana Tech	20–38	10–20	6th	
2005	Louisiana Tech	17–39	9–20	6th	
2006	Louisiana Tech	33–25	11–13	5th	
2007	Louisiana Tech	35–24	14–10	3rd	
2008	Louisiana Tech	23–31	7–23	7th	
2009	Louisiana Tech	29–22	13–11	2nd	
2010	Louisiana Tech	27–30	11–13	5th	
2011	Louisiana Tech	34–27	12–12	T–3rd	
2012	Louisiana Tech	27–28	7–11	6th	
2013	Louisiana Tech	19–37	6–21	10th	
Louisiana Tech Bulldogs (Conference USA) (2014)
2014	Louisiana Tech	15–35	5–25	13th	
Louisiana Tech:		297–370–1	115–199		
Total:		297–370–1			
National champion Postseason invitational champion Conference regular season champion Conference regular season and conference tournament champion Division regular season champion Division regular season and conference tournament champion Conference tournament champion
