= Vimael Machín =

Puerto Rican baseball player (born 1993)

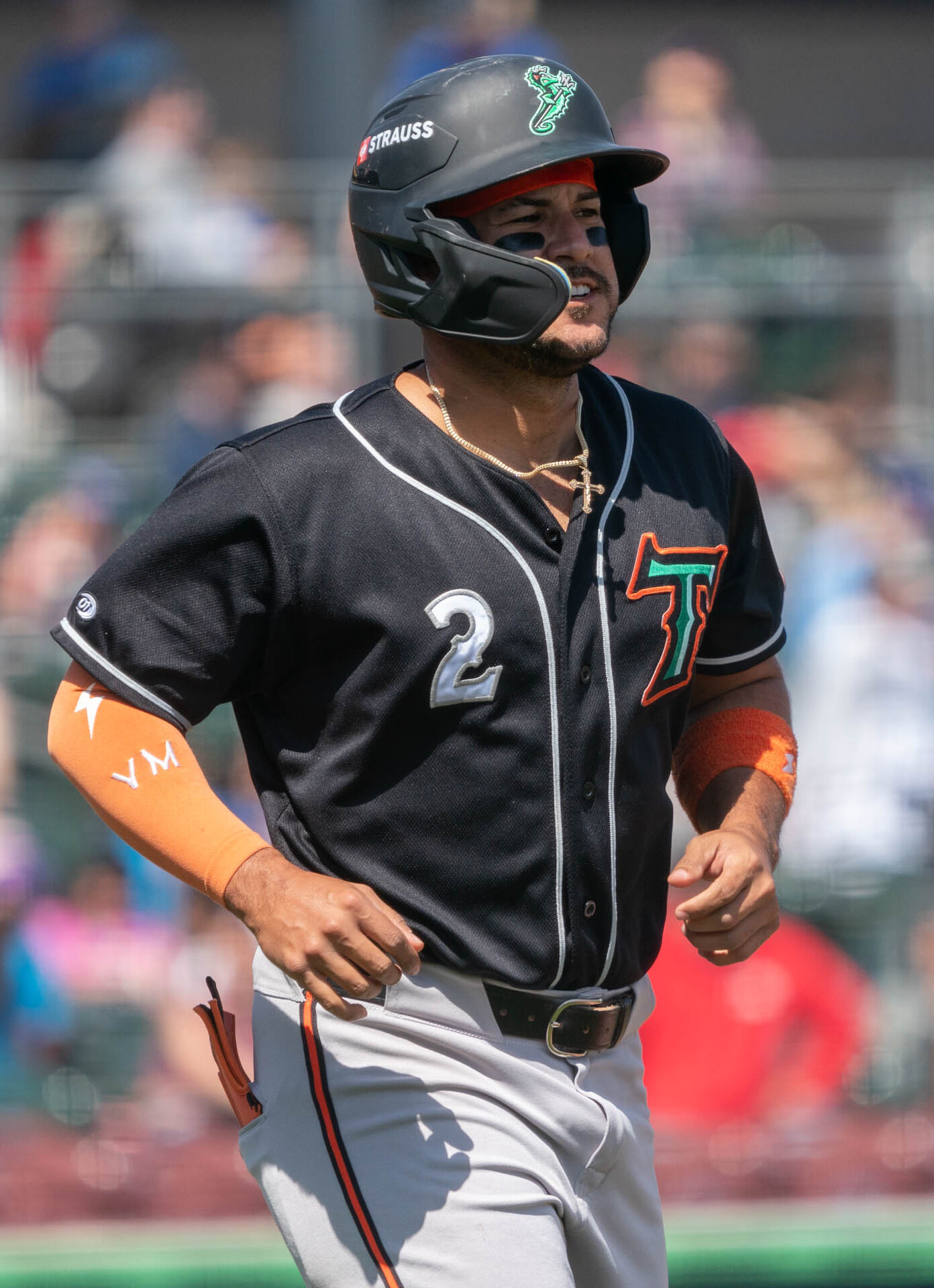
- Machín with the Norfolk Tides in 2025

Free agent
- Infielder
- Born: September 25, 1993 (age 33); Humacao, Puerto Rico
- Bats: Left Throws: Right

MLB debut
- July 26, 2020, for the Oakland Athletics

MLB statistics (through 2026 season)
- Batting average: .209
- Home runs: 2
- Runs batted in: 15
- Stats at Baseball Reference

Teams
- Oakland Athletics (2020–2022); Baltimore Orioles (2025); Colorado Rockies (2026)

Vimael Machín Soto (born September 25, 1993) is a Puerto Rican professional baseball infielder who is a free agent. He has previously played in Major League Baseball (MLB) for the Oakland Athletics, Baltimore Orioles, and Colorado Rockies.

== Career ==
=== Amateur ===
Machín attended Puerto Rico Baseball Academy and High School in Gurabo, Puerto Rico. He was drafted by the San Diego Padres in the 29th round of the 2011 MLB draft, but did not sign. He attended Virginia Commonwealth University and played four years of college baseball for the VCU Rams. In 2014, he played collegiate summer baseball with the Danbury Westerners of the New England Collegiate Baseball League and the Bourne Braves of the Cape Cod Baseball League.

=== Chicago Cubs ===
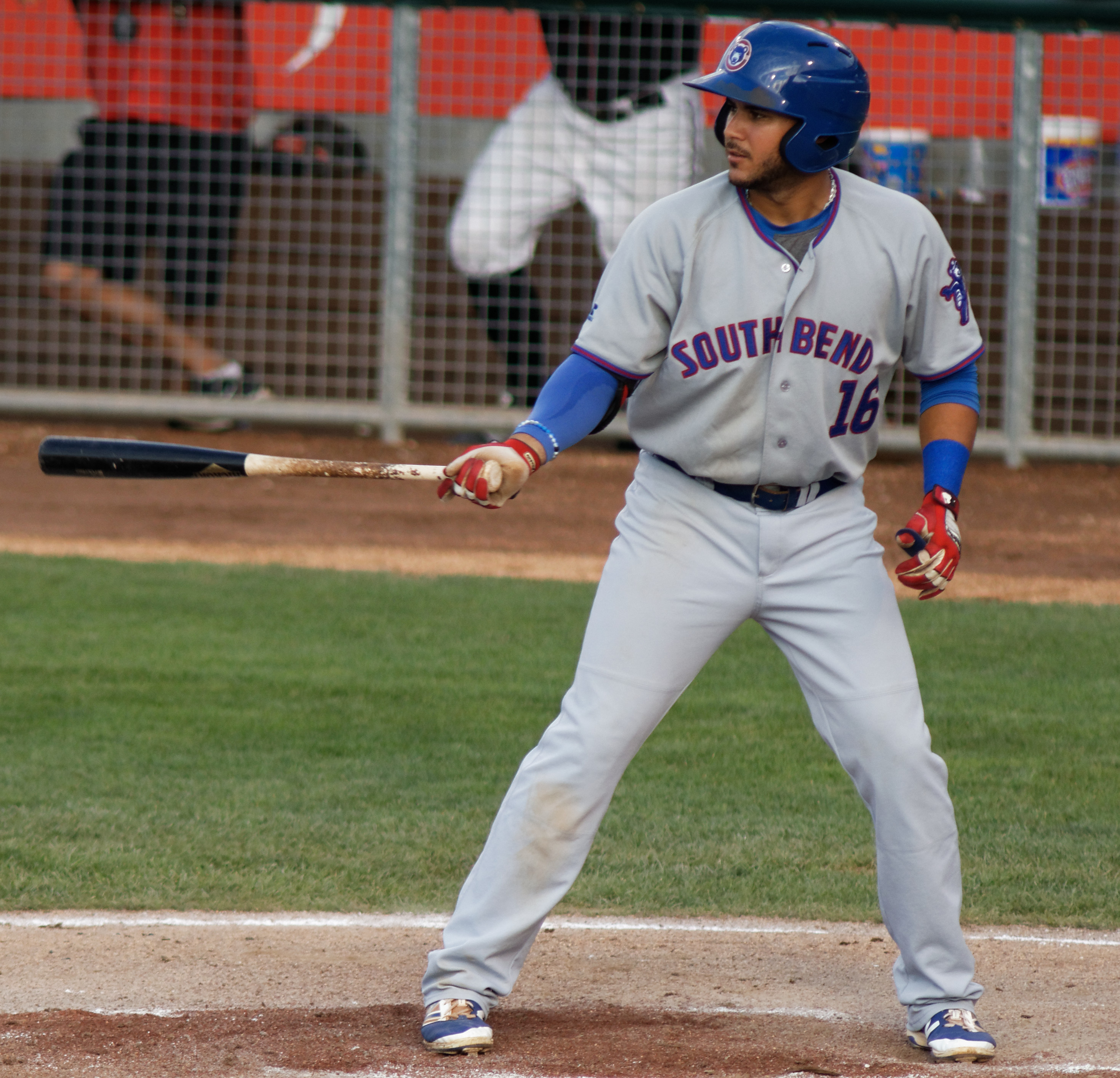
Machin with the South Bend Cubs in 2016

He was drafted by the Chicago Cubs in the 10th round of the 2015 MLB draft and signed with them.

Machín split the 2015 season between the Eugene Emeralds and South Bend Cubs, hitting a combined .181/.270/.222/.492 with 10 RBI. He split the 2016 season between Eugene, South Bend, and the Iowa Cubs, hitting a combined .267/.377/.311/.688 with 17 RBI. He split the 2017 season between South Bend and the Myrtle Beach Pelicans, hitting a combined .303/.360/.438/.798 with 11 home runs and 72 RBI. He split the 2018 season between Myrtle Beach and the Tennessee Smokies, hitting a combined .217/.343/.325/.668 with 7 home runs and 42 RBI. He split the 2019 season between Tennessee and Iowa, hitting a combined .295/.390/.412/.802 with 7 home runs and 62 RBI.

=== Oakland Athletics ===
On December 12, 2019, Machín was selected by the Philadelphia Phillies in the 2019 Rule 5 draft, and traded to the Oakland Athletics for cash. He made his major league debut on July 26, 2020, against the Los Angeles Angels, going hitless in 3 at-bats. In 24 games in his rookie campaign, Machín slashed .206/.296/.238 with no home runs or RBI. In 2021, Machín played in only 15 games for Oakland, going 4-for-32 with no home runs and one RBI. In 89 games spent with the Triple-A Las Vegas Aviators, he batted .295/.389/.479 with 11 home runs and 58 RBI.

On April 3, 2022, Machín was outrighted to Triple-A. On June 30, he was selected back to the 40-man and active rosters. On July 10, Machín hit his first career home run off of Houston Astros reliever Phil Maton. It was his first multi-hit game, as he went 2-for-4. In 73 games for the A’s in 2022, he posted a slash of .220/.300/.287 with one home run and a career-high 13 RBI. He was designated for assignment following the trade of Sean Murphy on December 12. He cleared waivers and was sent outright to Triple-A Las Vegas on December 16. However, two days later, Machín elected free agency in lieu of the assignment.

=== Philadelphia Phillies ===
On January 12, 2023, Machín signed a minor league contract with the Philadelphia Phillies organization. In 52 games for the Triple-A Lehigh Valley IronPigs, he hit .235/.330/.339 with 4 home runs and 21 RBI. Machín was released by Philadelphia on June 13.

=== Mariachis de Guadalajara ===
On June 19, 2023, Machín signed with the Mariachis de Guadalajara of the Mexican League. In 40 games for Guadalajara, he batted .338/.415/.540 with 4 home runs and 21 RBI.

=== Charros de Jalisco ===
On April 4, 2024, Machín signed with the Charros de Jalisco of the Mexican League. In 85 games for Jalisco, he slashed .401/.495/.579 with seven home runs, 54 RBI, and 10 stolen bases.

=== Baltimore Orioles ===
On November 11, 2024, Machín signed a minor league contract with the Baltimore Orioles organization. He began the season with the Triple-A Norfolk Tides, making 107 appearances and batting .285/.344/.470 with 15 home runs, 70 RBI, and 13 stolen bases. On August 22, 2025, the Orioles selected Machín's contract, adding him to their active roster. In four appearances for Baltimore, he went 1-for-11 (.091) with one home run, one RBI, and one walk. Machín was designated for assignment following the promotion of Emmanuel Rivera on August 27. He cleared waivers and was sent outright to Triple-A Norfolk on August 29. Machín elected free agency on September 29.

=== Colorado Rockies ===
On December 21, 2025, Machín signed a minor league contract with Colorado Rockies. On September 5, 2026, the Rockies selected Machín's contract, adding him to their active roster. He made three appearances for Colorado, going 3–for–6 (.500). On September 19, Machín was designated for assignment by the Rockies. He cleared waivers and was sent outright to the Arizona Complex League Rockies on September 23. He elected free agency on November 2.

== International career ==
Machín has played since 2018 with Criollos de Caguas in Puerto Rico's winter league.
