= Danilo León =

Venezuelan baseball player (born 1967)

- Relief pitcher
- Born: April 3, 1967 (age 59); La Cañada de Urdaneta, Zulia, Venezuela
- Batted: Right Threw: Right

MLB debut
- June 6, 1992, for the Texas Rangers

Last MLB appearance
- August 4, 1992, for the Texas Rangers

MLB statistics
- Win–loss record: 1-1
- Earned run average: 5.89
- Strikeouts: 15
- Stats at Baseball Reference

Teams
- Texas Rangers (1992)

Danilo Enrique León Lineco (born April 3, 1967) is a Venezuelan former professional relief pitcher in Major League Baseball. Listed at 6 ft 1 in (1.85 m), 170 pounds (77 kg), he batted and threw right handed. In addition, he pitched in the Venezuelan Professional Baseball League and Mexican Baseball.

== Career ==
Born in La Cañada de Urdaneta, Zulia, León began his professional baseball career at the age of 19 with the Gulf Coast Expos in 1986. In 1988, he posted a combined record of 10 wins with 3 losses along with a 1.38 earned run average and 115 strikeouts in 130 innings pitched.

León made his major league debut with the Texas Rangers in 1992, but only managed to post a 5.89 earned run average in 18 innings and returned to play in the minor leagues the following season.

In between, he pitched in the Venezuelan league for 15 seasons, most notably for the Águilas del Zulia club. He ended his career in 2005 at the age of 37.

== Highlights ==
On November 23, 1999, León hurled a 2–0 no-hitter against the Tigres de Aragua at Estadio Luis Aparicio El Grande in Maracaibo.

He also has the second most strikeouts in Águilas team history, being surpassed only by Julio Machado.

== See also ==
- List of Major League Baseball players from Venezuela
