= Mark Doubleday =

Australian baseball player

Personal information
- Full name: Mark Lindsay Doubleday
- Born: 10 August 1973 (age 52) Sydney, Australia

Sport
- Country: Australia
- Sport: Baseball
- University team: Louisiana Tech

Mark Doubleday (born 10 August 1973 in Sydney) is an Australian baseball player. He represented Australia at the 1996 Summer Olympics.
