= Puerto Rico Baseball Academy and High School =

Puerto Rican non-profit organization

Coordinates: 18°14′58.5″N 65°58′56.5″W

Location
- Carr 189 Km 6.2 Bo. Rincón; Gurabo, Puerto Rico 00778

Information
- School type: Independent Baseball Academy and High School
- Established: 2001
- Director: Jorge Inclán
- Grades: 10th through 12th grade
- Language: Spanish/English
- Colors: purple and white

The Puerto Rico Baseball Academy & High School (PRBAHS) is a non-profit organization combining academics and sports programs into one curriculum. Its goal is to prepare its students for higher education, competitive college scholarship opportunities, and the Major League Baseball draft. The PRBAHS is one of the only baseball high schools in Puerto Rico or the United States with this type of learning environment.

The school is located 30 minutes outside of San Juan near the University of Turabo in Gurabo, Puerto Rico. It admits students ages 14–18 into 10th through 12th grade.

== History ==
The school was first envisioned by former Texas Rangers pitcher Edwin Correa, who was motivated by the decline of Puerto Rican players in the major leagues. The Dominican Republic has recently had many more players signed than Puerto Rico has, in part because of differing rules. United States standards, upheld by the PRBAHS, require players to complete a high school diploma or to be at least 18 years of age, while Dominican players are able to sign with major league organizations as early as 16 years of age. For the 2003 season, there were 38 versus 79 on the Major League rosters that came from Puerto Rico and the Dominican Republic, respectively.

Although the school was founded in 2001, its inception began 1999, when founder Ed Correa coached at Las Palmas, the Los Angeles Dodgers’ complex located in the Dominican Republic. It was at Las Palmas where his vision began and he decided to use the complex as a model to draft his own prototype.

== Program curriculum ==
The core academic curriculum includes courses in Spanish, English, United States History, Puerto Rican History, Latin American History, Biology, Work Management, Chemistry, Physics, Geometry, Algebra, Trigonometry, and Pre-calculus. The available electives are Health, Photography, Psychology, Sports Psychology, Music, Journalism, Ethics, History of Baseball, and the Critical Analysis of Chess.

The baseball program emphasizes the mental, physical, and technical aspects of each position to create a complete understanding of the game. Topics covered include throwing mechanics, weight training, fielding mechanics, communication, running the bases, the mental aspect of the game, run downs, the art of pitching, the art of catching, and bunt plays.

== Community involvement ==
In addition to academics and sport, the school also encourages community outreach and involvement in local activities. Students visit hospitals during the holidays, participate in interactive sporting days with children who have disabilities, and visit centers for children.

== Notable alumni ==
- Hiram Burgos
- Carlos Correa
- Joe Jiménez
- Christian Vázquez
- Reynaldo Navarro
- Jesmuel Valentin
- Joe Colón
- Víctor Caratini
- Vimael Machin
