= Paul Wilmet =

American baseball player (born 1958)

- Pitcher
- Born: November 8, 1958 (age 67); Green Bay, Wisconsin, U.S.
- Batted: Right Threw: Right

MLB debut
- July 25, 1989, for the Texas Rangers

Last MLB appearance
- July 29, 1989, for the Texas Rangers

MLB statistics
- Win–loss record: 0–0
- Earned run average: 15.43
- Strikeouts: 1
- Stats at Baseball Reference

Teams
- Texas Rangers (1989)

Paul Richard Wilmet (born November 8, 1958) is a former professional baseball pitcher. He appeared in three Major League Baseball games for the Texas Rangers during their 1989 season.

Wilmet learned a slider from his brother, Steve, who played in the Los Angeles Dodgers system. Wilmet attended West De Pere High School in Wisconsin and played college baseball at Des Moines Area Community College in Boone, Iowa.

Having been undrafted out of college, Wilmet toured as a musician for a few years before focusing on playing amateur baseball in Green Bay, Wisconsin. On the strength of his amateur performance, he was offered contracts by the Dodgers and the New York Mets. After flipping a coin, he signed with the Mets. When the Mets released him, he drove to St. Louis Cardinals spring training and camped out in the back of his Ford E-Series van until he was offered a contract.

In his Major League debut on July 25, 1989, Wilmet helped set a Texas Rangers franchise record for strikeouts in a nine-inning game. After Nolan Ryan recorded 14 strikeouts in six innings and Kenny Rogers added three, Wilmet added the team's eighteenth strikeout in the ninth inning.
