= John Barfield =

American baseball player (1964-2016)

- Pitcher
- Born: October 15, 1964; Pine Bluff, Arkansas, U.S.
- Died: December 24, 2016 (aged 52); Little Rock, Arkansas, U.S.
- Batted: Left Threw: Left

MLB debut
- September 7, 1989, for the Texas Rangers

Last MLB appearance
- August 1, 1991, for the Texas Rangers

MLB statistics
- Win–loss record: 8–8
- Earned run average: 4.72
- Strikeouts: 53
- Stats at Baseball Reference

Teams
- Texas Rangers (1989–1991)

John David Barfield (October 15, 1964 – December 24, 2016) was an American Major League Baseball pitcher. He played during three seasons (1989 to 1991) at the major league level for the Texas Rangers. He pitched in the affiliated minor leagues through 1997 and concluded his career the next year in the independent Atlantic League of Professional Baseball. He died in a shooting in Little Rock, Arkansas.

== Early life ==
Barfield attended Pine Bluff High School in Pine Bluff, Arkansas. He starred for the baseball team, which won a state championship. Barfield played in the same Pine Bluff baseball program that produced future Rangers pitcher Mike Jeffcoat. Barfield played college baseball at Crowder College in Neosho, Missouri, and at Oklahoma City University. He was drafted by the Rangers in the 11th round (267th overall) of the 1986 amateur draft.

== Career ==
Barfield played his first professional season with the Class A-Advanced Daytona Beach Admirals and Salem Redbirds in 1986. By 1988, he had advanced to the Class AA Tulsa Drillers, where he was on the pitching staff with future major leaguers Kevin Brown, Kenny Rogers and Steve Wilson. Barfield was a Texas League All-Star and finished with a 9–9 record with a 2.88 earned run average (ERA).

He made his MLB debut in 1989. He appeared in four games for the Rangers that year, two of them starts, and he gave up eight earned runs in 11 2/3 innings. The next year, he appeared in 33 games, all as a relief pitcher. In 1991, Barfield was the long reliever for the Rangers, but in June, with starting pitchers Bobby Witt and Scott Chiamparino on the disabled list, Barfield made his first start of the season. He pitched 6 2/3 innings and earned the win. He started several more games that season, but he developed a rib fracture which caused pain and poor pitching during his last three starts. In August, the injury sidelined him for the rest of the season.

Between 1992 and 1997, pitched for minor league affiliates of several organizations and spent some time in the Mexican League. His last season in the affiliated minor leagues was with the Buffalo Bisons, the Triple-A affiliate of the Cleveland Indians. In 1998, he pitched in the independent Atlantic League for the Newark Bears and the Atlantic City Surf, winning one of his seven decisions that year.

== Death ==
Barfield was shot during a dispute at his apartment in downtown Little Rock, Arkansas, on December 24, 2016. He was taken to a hospital, where he died during surgery. A 59-year-old acquaintance named William Goodman, who was the estranged husband of Barfield's girlfriend Mystic Goodman, was arrested and charged with first-degree murder. On August 10, 2017, Goodman was convicted of manslaughter after a Pulaski County jury concluded that the killing was reckless but not deliberate and Goodman was sentenced to the maximum 25 years in prison with a $10,000 fine. Goodman was sentenced to 10 years for manslaughter and 15 years for firearm enhancement, with the sentences to be served consecutively.
