= Ed Correa =

Puerto Rican baseball player (born 1966)

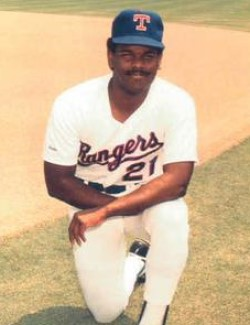
- Pitcher
- Born: April 29, 1966 (age 60); Hato Rey, Puerto Rico
- Batted: Right Threw: Right

MLB debut
- September 18, 1985, for the Chicago White Sox

Last MLB appearance
- July 5, 1987, for the Texas Rangers

MLB statistics
- Win–loss record: 16–19
- Earned run average: 5.16
- Strikeouts: 260
- Stats at Baseball Reference

Teams
- Chicago White Sox (1985); Texas Rangers (1986–1987)

Edwin Josue Correa (born April 29, 1966) is a Puerto Rican former professional baseball player from Puerto Rico. He played three seasons in Major League Baseball (MLB), debuting in 1985 for the Chicago White Sox and playing for the Texas Rangers in the 1986 and 1987 seasons.

== Biography ==
Correa was born on April 29, 1966 in Hato Rey, Puerto Rico. His father was a police officer and his mother was a nurse.

== MLB career ==
As a rookie in 1986, Correa lead all rookies with 189 strikeouts and was part of the "Kiddie Corps" of Rangers rookies that helped the team to a surprising 2nd-place finish with a record of 87–75. At the age of 20, Correa was one of the youngest players in Major League Baseball at the time.

Correa and his team in the 2007 Pony League World Series

Correa was a practicing Seventh-day Adventist and as such would not pitch in any game from sundown Friday till sundown Saturday. The Rangers were able to work around this disruption to their five-man pitching staff due to Charlie Hough's ability to pitch often on short rest. In 1987 Correa injured his arm and never pitched in the majors again.

== Post-MLB career ==
Correa managed the Trujillo Alto, Puerto Rico PONY Baseball team that won the 2007 World Series in Washington, Pennsylvania. His team played against seven other teams to win the title.

Correa founded the Puerto Rico Baseball Academy and High School, a secondary school that also offers intensive baseball training in addition to its academic program.

== See also ==
- List of Major League Baseball players from Puerto Rico
