= Cris Colón =

Venezuelan baseball player (born 1969)

- Shortstop
- Born: January 3, 1969 (age 57); La Guaira, Venezuela
- Batted: Switch Threw: Right

MLB debut
- September 18, 1992, for the Texas Rangers

Last MLB appearance
- October 4, 1992, for the Texas Rangers

MLB statistics
- Batting average: .167
- Home runs: 0
- Runs batted in: 1

CPBL statistics
- Batting average: .315
- Home runs: 11
- Runs batted in: 48
- Stats at Baseball Reference

Teams
- Texas Rangers (1992); Mercuries Tigers (1997)

Cristóbal Colón (born January 3, 1969) is a Venezuelan former professional baseball player. He played in Major League Baseball as a shortstop for the Texas Rangers (1992). He was a switch-hitting batter.

== Career ==
Colón was born in La Guaira, Vargas State, Venezuela. A nephew of former major league player Chico Carrasquel, Colón was named in honor of Christopher Columbus, by his father.

Colón was a career .167 hitter (6-for-36) with one RBI and five runs in 14 games.

== See also ==
- List of players from Venezuela in Major League Baseball
