= Joe Bitker =

American baseball player (born 1964)

- Pitcher
- Born: February 12, 1964 (age 62); Glendale, California, U.S.
- Batted: Right Threw: Right

MLB debut
- July 31, 1990, for the Oakland Athletics

Last MLB appearance
- June 19, 1991, for the Texas Rangers

MLB statistics
- Win–loss record: 1–0
- Earned run average: 4.72
- Strikeouts: 24
- Stats at Baseball Reference

Teams
- Oakland Athletics (1990); Texas Rangers (1990–1991)

Joseph Anthony Bitker (born February 12, 1964) is an American former Major League Baseball pitcher who played for two seasons. He played for the Oakland Athletics for one game on July 31, 1990, then was traded to the Texas Rangers with Scott Chiamparino for Harold Baines. He then played for the Rangers in 1990 and 1991.
