= Jeff Richardson (infielder) =

American baseball player (born 1965)

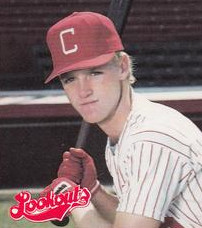
- Richardson in 1988
- Infielder
- Born: August 26, 1965 (age 59); Grand Island, Nebraska, U.S.
- Batted: Right Threw: Right

MLB debut
- July 14, 1989, for the Cincinnati Reds

Last MLB appearance
- May 28, 1993, for the Boston Red Sox

MLB statistics
- Batting average: .176
- Home runs: 2
- Runs batted in: 13
- Stats at Baseball Reference

Teams
- Cincinnati Reds (1989); Pittsburgh Pirates (1991); Boston Red Sox (1993)

Jeffrey Scott Richardson (born August 26, 1965) is an American former professional infielder. He played during three seasons at the Major League Baseball (MLB) for the Cincinnati Reds, Pittsburgh Pirates, and Boston Red Sox. He was drafted by the Reds in the 7th round of the 1986 Major League Baseball draft. Richardson played his first professional season with their Rookie league Billings Mustangs in 1986, and his last with Pittsburgh's Triple-A Calgary Cannons in 1995. He played college baseball for Louisiana Tech.
