= Ramón Mañón =

Dominican baseball player (born 1968)

- Pitcher
- Born: January 20, 1968 (age 58); Santo Domingo, Dominican Republic
- Batted: Right Threw: Right

MLB debut
- April 19, 1990, for the Texas Rangers

Last MLB appearance
- April 19, 1990, for the Texas Rangers

MLB statistics
- Win–loss record: 0–0
- Earned run average: 13.50
- Strikeouts: 0

CPBL statistics
- Win–loss record: 0–0
- Earned run average: 5.00
- Strikeouts: 5
- Stats at Baseball Reference

Teams
- Texas Rangers (1990); Uni-President Lions (1994)

Ramón Mañón Reyes (born January 20, 1968) is a Dominican former professional baseball pitcher. He appeared in one game in Major League Baseball for the Texas Rangers in 1990.

Mañón was originally signed as an amateur free agent by the New York Yankees in 1985. After several seasons in their farm system, he was selected by the Rangers in the Rule 5 draft after the 1989 season. After appearing in just one game, the Rangers chose not to keep him, and returned him to the Yankees on April 30, 1990.

Mañón remained in the Yankees organization until the end of the 1992 season, when he became a free agent. He signed with the Chicago White Sox, and pitched for their Double-A farm club, the Birmingham Barons in 1993. After sitting out the 1994 season, Mañón played for the Minnesota Skeeters of the short-lived North Central League in 1995.
