= Drew Hall =

American baseball player (born 1963)

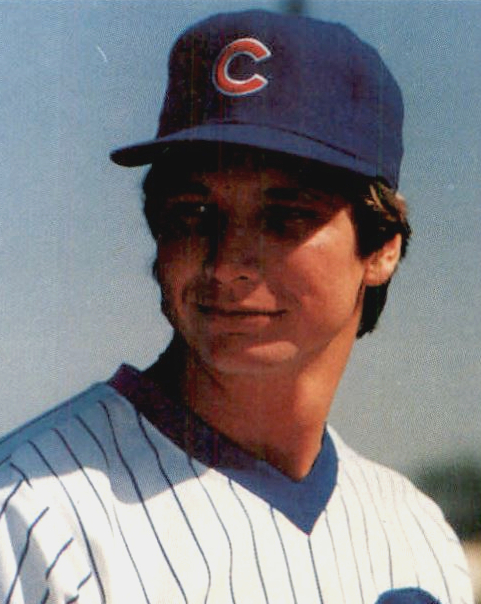
- Hall c. 1987
- Pitcher
- Born: March 27, 1963 (age 63); Louisville, Kentucky, U.S.
- Batted: Left Threw: Left

MLB debut
- September 14, 1986, for the Chicago Cubs

Last MLB appearance
- September 26, 1990, for the Montreal Expos

MLB statistics
- Win–loss record: 9–12
- Earned run average: 5.21
- Strikeouts: 148
- Stats at Baseball Reference

Teams
- Chicago Cubs (1986–1988); Texas Rangers (1989); Montreal Expos (1990)

Andrew Clark Hall (born March 27, 1963) is an American former Major League Baseball pitcher. He played with the Chicago Cubs (1986–1988), Texas Rangers (1989) and Montreal Expos (1990). He was born in Louisville, Kentucky, but grew up in Ashland, Kentucky, and attended Paul G. Blazer High School. He then attended Morehead State University. He is most famous for being involved in the Rafael Palmeiro and Mitch Williams trade in 1988. He was used primarily as a relief pitcher and spot starter.

In 1984, Hall was a member of the 30-man Olympic baseball roster. While at training camp for the Olympic team, he signed a contract to play professionally for the Chicago Cubs. The contract allowed him to remain as amateur status until the conclusion of the Olympics. He is still the highest draft pick by a Major League Baseball team in the state of Kentucky. In the majors, he went 9–12 with a 5.21 earned run average with 148 strikeouts.

Hall returned to his alma mater, Morehead State University, in 2008 to serve one year as the pitching coach under Head Coach Jay Sorg. He now works with Kentucky area baseball teams.
