= Gary Mielke =

American baseball player (born 1963)

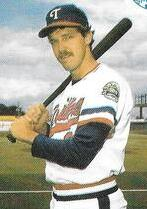
- Mielke with the Tulsa Drillers c. 1987
- Pitcher
- Born: January 28, 1963 (age 63); St. James, Minnesota, U.S.
- Batted: Right Threw: Right

MLB debut
- August 19, 1987, for the Texas Rangers

Last MLB appearance
- September 30, 1990, for the Texas Rangers

MLB statistics
- Win–loss record: 1–3
- Earned run average: 3.56
- Strikeouts: 42
- Stats at Baseball Reference

Teams
- Texas Rangers (1987, 1989–1990)

Gary Roger Mielke (born January 28, 1963) is an American former right-handed pitcher in Major League Baseball who played three seasons for the Texas Rangers (1987, 1989, and 1990). Prior to his Major League career, Mielke played for Minnesota State University in Mankato. On August 24, 1989, Mielke notched his only career save, against the Oakland Athletics. He preserved the win for Mike Jeffcoat by going 2 2/3 scoreless innings to close out a 6-2 Rangers victory. On June 21, 1989, Mielke picked up his only MLB victory, against the Boston Red Sox. The losing pitcher that day was seven-time Cy Young Award winner Roger Clemens. Mielke would go on to pitch in relief for Texas during the 1990 season, but was granted free agency on November 15, 1990. During 1991, Mielke again pitched in the Rangers' minor league system, then that of Oakland, but this marked his final professional season.
