= Bob Malloy (1980s pitcher) =

American baseball player (born 1964)

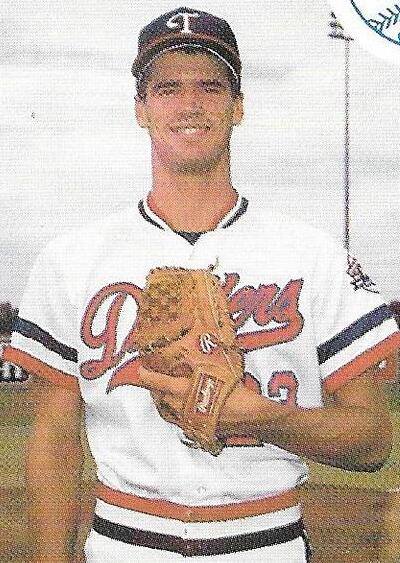
- Malloy with the Tulsa Drillers c. 1987
- Pitcher
- Born: November 24, 1964 (age 61); Arlington, Virginia, U.S.
- Batted: Right Threw: Right

MLB debut
- May 26, 1987, for the Texas Rangers

Last MLB appearance
- June 8, 1990, for the Montreal Expos

MLB statistics
- Win–loss record: 0–0
- Earned run average: 5.54
- Strikeouts: 9
- Stats at Baseball Reference

Teams
- Texas Rangers (1987); Montreal Expos (1990)

Robert William Malloy (born November 24, 1964) is an American former professional baseball pitcher. He played two seasons in Major League Baseball for the Texas Rangers and Montreal Expos.

Malloy attended Gar-Field High School in Woodbridge, Virginia, and later the University of Virginia. Malloy was drafted in the 19th round of the 1986 MLB draft (475th overall) following his junior year at UVA. After quick success in the Rangers' minor league system, Malloy was called up to the Majors and started two games in 1987. He also pitched two scoreless innings in relief for the Montreal Expos in 1990.
