= Dean Palmer =

American baseball player (born 1968)

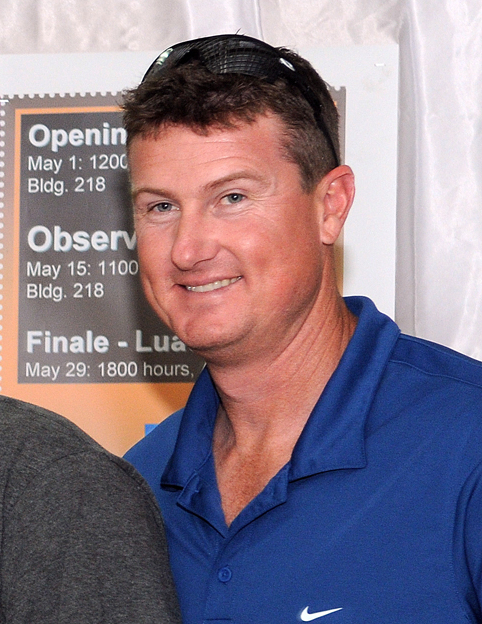
- Third baseman
- Born: December 27, 1968 (age 57); Tallahassee, Florida, U.S.
- Batted: Right Threw: Right

MLB debut
- September 1, 1989, for the Texas Rangers

Last MLB appearance
- May 9, 2003, for the Detroit Tigers

MLB statistics
- Batting average: .251
- Home runs: 275
- Runs batted in: 849
- Stats at Baseball Reference

Teams
- Texas Rangers (1989–1997); Kansas City Royals (1997–1998); Detroit Tigers (1999–2003)

Career highlights and awards
- All-Star (1998); 2× Silver Slugger Award (1998, 1999)

Dean William Palmer (born December 27, 1968) is an American former third baseman in Major League Baseball who had a 14-year career from 1989 to 2003. He played for the Texas Rangers, Kansas City Royals and Detroit Tigers, all of the American League.

In 1991, Palmer won the American Association home run title with 22 HRs despite only playing in 60 games.

In 1992, Palmer became the first Texas ballplayer to homer in the first three games of a season, a feat that was matched in 2011 by Ian Kinsler and Nelson Cruz.

He was selected for the American League All-Star team in 1998, as the required Royal, and he led the league in strikeouts in 1992 with 154. Palmer was the recipient of the Silver Slugger at third base in 1998 with the Kansas City Royals and 1999 for the Detroit Tigers.

Palmer retired following the 2003 baseball season, after various injuries limited him to fewer than 100 games over the three previous seasons. He attempted a comeback with the Tigers during 2005 spring training, but failed to make the team, after which he retired again.

In 1,357 games over 14 seasons, Palmer posted a .251 batting average (1,229-for-4,902) with 734 runs, 231 doubles, 15 triples, 275 home runs, 849 RBI, 48 stolen bases, 502 bases on balls, .324 on-base percentage, and .472 slugging percentage. Defensively, he finished his career with a .937 fielding percentage playing primarily at third base. His only postseason appearance was in the 1996 American League Division Series, posting a .211 batting average (4-for-19) with 1 home run and 2 RBI.

== See also ==
- List of Major League Baseball career home run leaders
