= Phil Hiatt =

American baseball player (born 1969)

- Third baseman
- Born: May 1, 1969 (age 57); Pensacola, Florida, U.S.
- Batted: Right Threw: Right

MLB debut
- April 7, 1993, for the Kansas City Royals

Last MLB appearance
- October 7, 2001, for the Los Angeles Dodgers

MLB statistics
- Batting average: .216
- Home runs: 13
- Runs batted in: 55

NPB statistics
- Batting average: .204
- Home runs: 11
- Runs batted in: 30
- Stats at Baseball Reference

Teams
- Kansas City Royals (1993, 1995); Detroit Tigers (1996); Hanshin Tigers (1997); Los Angeles Dodgers (2001)

Phillip Farrell Hiatt (/ˈhaɪ.ət/ HY-ət; born May 1, 1969) is an American former professional Major League Baseball utility player.

Hiatt played college baseball at Louisiana Tech University.

Hiatt played for three different major league ball clubs during his career: the Kansas City Royals (1993–1995), Detroit Tigers (1996), and Los Angeles Dodgers (2001). He made his Major League Baseball debut on April 7, 1993, and played his final game on October 7, 2001. He played in Japan for the Hanshin Tigers in 1997.

Hiatt last appeared with a Major League team as non-roster invitee of the Washington Nationals during spring training prior to the 2005 season. He was not added to the big league roster.

He was named in the December 13, 2007 Mitchell Report on steroid abuse in baseball.

Hiatt played over 1,400 minor league games in his career and hit over 300 home runs in the minor leagues. He was named the International League MVP in 1996, when he totaled 42 home runs and 119 RBI.

== See also ==
- List of Major League Baseball players named in the Mitchell Report
