= Kevin Belcher (baseball) =

American baseball player (born 1967)

- Outfielder
- Born: August 8, 1967 (age 58); Waco, Texas, U.S.
- Batted: Right Threw: Right

MLB debut
- September 3, 1990, for the Texas Rangers

Last MLB appearance
- October 3, 1990, for the Texas Rangers

MLB statistics
- Batting average: .133
- Home runs: 0
- Runs batted in: 0
- Stats at Baseball Reference

Teams
- Texas Rangers (1990)

Kevin Donnell Belcher (born August 8, 1967) is an American former professional baseball player. He played 16 games in Major League Baseball (MLB) for the Texas Rangers during the 1990 season, primarily as an outfielder. Listed at 6 feet 0 inches (1.83 m) and 170 pounds (77 kg), he threw and batted right-handed.

== Career ==
Belcher played college baseball at Navarro College in 1986. He was selected by the Texas Rangers in the sixth round of the 1987 MLB draft. He began his professional career playing in the rookie-level Gulf Coast League. He advanced through the Rangers' farm system, being named a mid-season all-star of the South Atlantic League at the Class A level in 1989, and reaching Double-A in 1990. He was ranked as the Rangers' sixth-best prospect that season, by Baseball America.

Belcher was a September call-up for the 1990 Rangers, along with Double-A teammate Bill Haselman. Both Belcher and Haselman made their MLB debuts on September 3, as pinch hitters in the eighth inning of a Rangers win over the Cleveland Indians. Belcher made a total of 16 appearances for the Rangers through the end of the season, collecting two hits in 15 at bats, with one double. Those were Belcher's only major-league appearances, although they made him the first player from Navarro College to reach MLB.

Belcher played professionally for three more seasons, at the Double-A and Triple-A levels. He spent his final season, 1993, with the Birmingham Barons, a Triple-A affiliate of the Chicago White Sox. In seven seasons of play in Minor League Baseball, Belcher had a .251 batting average with 71 home runs and 298 runs batted in in 677 games.

During the 1994–95 Major League Baseball strike, Belcher appeared as a replacement player for the Houston Astros in spring training of 1995.
