= Dan Smith (left-handed pitcher) =

American baseball player (born 1969)

- Pitcher
- Born: April 20, 1969 (age 57); St. Paul, Minnesota, U.S.
- Batted: Left Threw: Left

MLB debut
- September 12, 1992, for the Texas Rangers

Last MLB appearance
- July 8, 1994, for the Texas Rangers

MLB statistics
- Win/loss record: 1–5
- Earned run average: 4.66
- Strikeouts: 14
- Stats at Baseball Reference

Teams
- Texas Rangers (1992, 1994)

Daniel Scott Smith (born April 20, 1969) is an American former Major League Baseball pitcher. He played in parts of two seasons in the majors, 1992 and 1994, for the Texas Rangers. The former first-round draft pick lefthander now resides in Flower Mound, TX.

== Sources ==
- Career statistics from Baseball Reference · Baseball Reference (Minors) · Retrosheet · Baseball Almanac
