= Orlando Gómez =

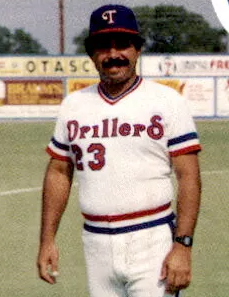
- Gómez with the Tulsa Drillers c. 1984
- Coach
- Born: June 24, 1946 (age 80); Juana Díaz, Puerto Rico
- Bats: Right Throws: Right
- Stats at Baseball Reference

Teams
- Texas Rangers (1991–1992); Tampa Bay Devil Rays (1998–2000); Seattle Mariners (2003–2004)

Juan Alejandro "Orlando" Gómez Tossas (born June 24, 1946) is a Puerto Rican former Major League Baseball coach and scout and minor league catcher and manager. When he served as the 2016 pilot of the Rookie-level GCL Orioles of the Gulf Coast League; it was Gómez' 21st year as a minor league manager, his 12th straight season in the Baltimore Orioles' organization, his second tour of duty (and third season overall) as skipper of the GCL Orioles, and his 53rd consecutive year in professional baseball.

Gómez retired from baseball after the 2016 season; his 278 managerial wins set a franchise record for the Frederick Keys, Baltimore's Single A–Advanced farm system affiliate in the Carolina League. He managed Frederick for four seasons (2010–12; 2015).

Gómez is the father-in-law of former Major League player José Hernández who has also coached in the Orioles organization.

== Major League coach for three clubs ==
Gómez spent seven years as a Major League coach for the Texas Rangers (1991–92), Tampa Bay Devil Rays (1998–2000), and Seattle Mariners (2003–04). He was a member of the first Tampa Bay Major League squad, working under manager Larry Rothschild during the Rays' maiden 1998 season as both bullpen and third-base coach. He also served on the MLB staffs of Bobby Valentine and Bob Melvin. As a scout for the Rangers, assigned to Latin America, Gómez was credited with signing Rubén Sierra and Juan Guzmán.

Gómez played 13 seasons (1964–76) in the minor leagues, mostly as a catcher and mostly in the organizations of the New York Yankees and Oakland Athletics. He reached the Triple-A level for 83 games over four different seasons. He threw and batted right-handed, stood 6 feet (1.8 m) tall and weighed 190 pounds (86 kg) during his active career.

In a minor league managerial career that began in 1977, Gómez also managed the Medicine Hat A's, Burlington Rangers, Tulsa Drillers, Waterbury Indians, Buffalo Bisons, Williamsport Bills, Gastonia Rangers, Everett AquaSox, Port City Roosters, Bluefield Orioles and Delmarva Shorebirds.

Sporting positions
Preceded by n/a	Texas Rangers bullpen coach 1991	Succeeded by Ray Burris
Preceded by Toby Harrah	Texas Rangers first base coach 1992	Succeeded by Perry Hill
Preceded by Franchise established Bobby Ramos	Tampa Bay Devil Rays bullpen coach 1998 (through Aug. 31); 1999–2000	Succeeded by Bobby Ramos; Darren Daulton
Preceded by Greg Riddoch	Tampa Bay Devil Rays third base coach 1998 (Sept. 1–27)	Succeeded by Greg Riddoch
Preceded by Matt Sinatro	Seattle Mariners bullpen coach 2003–2004	Succeeded by Jim Slaton
