= Jack Daugherty (baseball) =

American baseball player (born 1960)

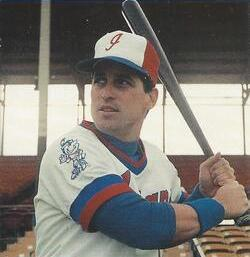
- Daugherty with the Indianapolis Indians c. 1987
- Left fielder / First baseman
- Born: July 3, 1960 (age 65); Hialeah, Florida, U.S.
- Batted: Switch Threw: Left

Professional debut
- MLB: September 1, 1987, for the Montreal Expos
- NPB: April 2, 1996, for the Chiba Lotte Marines

Last appearance
- MLB: October 5, 1993, for the Cincinnati Reds
- NPB: May 18, 1996, for the Chiba Lotte Marines

MLB statistics
- Batting average: .256
- Home runs: 10
- Runs batted in: 87

NPB statistics
- Batting average: .119
- Home runs: 0
- Runs batted in: 4
- Stats at Baseball Reference

Teams
- Montreal Expos (1987); Texas Rangers (1989–1992); Houston Astros (1993); Cincinnati Reds (1993); Chiba Lotte Marines (1996)

John Michael Daugherty (born July 3, 1960) is an American former Major League Baseball first baseman and outfielder for parts of seven seasons with the Texas Rangers, Houston Astros, Cincinnati Reds and Montreal Expos.

== Career ==
=== Amateur career ===
Daugherty played high school baseball at Kearny High School, in San Diego, California. At the collegiate level he played for the University of Arizona, and was signed as an undrafted free agent by the Oakland Athletics on October 9, 1982.

=== Minors and independent league ===
Daugherty was released by the A's in January 1984 after only one season in their farm system. He played the 1984 season for the independent Helena Gold Sox of the Pioneer Baseball League before signing with the Montreal Expos in December.

=== Montreal Expos ===
Daugherty made his major league debut in 1987 as a first baseman with the Montreal Expos. He was 1 for 10 in 11 games with his only hit coming against Greg Maddux. After spending the entire 1988 season in the minors, batting .285 for the Indianapolis Indians, he was sent to the Texas Rangers to complete an earlier deal in which the Rangers sent Tom O'Malley to the Expos for a player to be named later.

=== Texas Rangers ===
In 1989 he was used as a pinch hitter, back-up first baseman, left fielder and occasional designated hitter for the 4th place Rangers. He posted solid hitting numbers, with a .302 average, .364 on-base percentage, and .406 slugging percentage, over 58 games.

Daugherty's best season was 1990, as he appeared in a career high 125 games, hit six home runs, drove in 47, and batted .300/.347/.435. He was the first Ranger to hit over .300 with 100 or more at-bats in back to back seasons since Al Oliver accomplished the feat in 1980-1981.

The best game of Daugherty's career came on Sunday, July 8, 1990, when he was 4 for 5 with two home runs and three RBIs. In fact, Daugherty hit 20% of his career home runs in that game and did so in back to back at-bats against pitchers Roger Clemens and Jeff Reardon. The home run against Clemens occurred in the 7th inning and the blast off of Reardon came in the bottom of the 9th to tie the game. The Rangers would go on to defeat the first placed Red Sox in 11 innings.

Injuries limited Daugherty's 1991 season to only 58 games, for which he posted lackluster statistics of .194/.270/.264. In 1992, Daugherty nearly duplicated his '91 effort by hitting .205/.295/.276 over 59 games. The Rangers subsequently released him following the 1992 season.

=== Houston Astros and Cincinnati Reds ===
Daugherty signed with the Houston Astros as a free agent on January 5, 1993. Assigned to the Astros' triple A affiliate the Tucson Toros, Daugherty responded by tearing up the Pacific Coast League by hitting .390/.488/.525 over 42 games. Despite these numbers, he found little playing time with the parent club, as perennial all-star Jeff Bagwell occupied first base and manager Art Howe seemed to prefer using Kevin Bass, Chris Donnels and Chris James as his primary pinch-hitters. Daugherty was 1 for 3 in just four games with Houston. His lone Astros hit came as a pinch-hitter against Bob Tewksbury of the St. Louis Cardinals in a 6-1 Astros loss at Busch Memorial Stadium on May 4, 1993. The Astros later traded Daugherty to the Cincinnati Reds on July 12, 1993, for Steve Carter. With Cincinnati, he played in 46 games while hitting .220/.338/.356.

=== Chiba Lotte Marines ===
In January 1994, Daugherty signed with the Colorado Rockies, but did not make the major league roster that Spring. After two seasons in the Toronto Blue Jays' and San Francisco Giants' farm systems, Daugherty played in 1996 for the Chiba Lotte Marines. He played in 19 games, batting .119, before being released in June.
