= Scott Chiamparino =

American baseball player (born 1966)

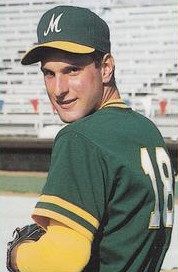
- Chiamparino in 1988
- Pitcher
- Born: August 22, 1966 (age 59); San Mateo, California, U.S.
- Batted: Right Threw: Right

MLB debut
- September 5, 1990, for the Texas Rangers

Last MLB appearance
- October 2, 1992, for the Texas Rangers

MLB statistics
- Win–loss record: 2–6
- Earned run average: 3.27
- Strikeouts: 40
- Stats at Baseball Reference

Teams
- Texas Rangers (1990–1992)

Scott Michael Chiamparino (born August 22, 1966) is an American former professional baseball pitcher. He played in Major League Baseball (MLB) for the Texas Rangers from 1990 to 1992. He is currently the Vice President of the Boras Corporation.

== Early life ==
Scott Michael Chiamparino was born on August 22, 1966, in San Mateo, California. He attended Junípero Serra High School, where he excelled in baseball.

== College career ==
Chiamparino attended Santa Clara University.

== Professional career ==
=== Draft and minor leagues ===
Chiamparino was drafted by the Oakland Athletics with the 95th pick in the fourth round of the 1987 MLB draft from Santa Clara University.

=== Texas Rangers (1990–1992) ===
On September 4, 1990, the Oakland Athletics sent pitcher Joe Bitker and Chiamparino to the Texas Rangers to complete an earlier deal made on August 29, 1990. On August 29, 1990, the Oakland Athletics had sent players to be named later to the Texas Rangers for designated hitter and right fielder Harold Baines. The next day, on September 5, at Arlington Stadium, in a 3-2 win over the Cleveland Indians, Chiamparino made his Major League debut for the Texas Rangers. He struck third baseman Brook Jacoby out looking in the top of the second inning for his first career Major League strikeout. He pitched five scoreless innings, giving up three hits while striking out three and walking one batter. On September 27 at Arlington Stadium, in an 8-6 win over the Oakland Athletics, Chiamparino earned his first career Major League victory by pitching seven innings and striking out five batters.

On September 19, 1992 at SkyDome, Chiamparino struck out a career-high six batters in a single Major League Baseball game.

On November 17, 1992, Chiamparino was drafted by the Florida Marlins as the 41st pick overall in the 1992 MLB expansion draft.

== Post-playing career ==
Chiamparino is currently the Vice President of the Boras Corporation in Newport Beach, California.
