= Mike Jeffcoat =

American baseball player (born 1959)

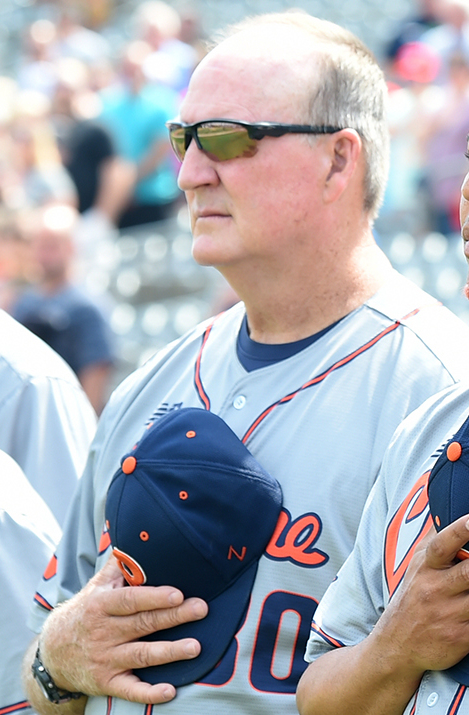
- Jeffcoat with the Cleburne Railroaders in 2019
- Pitcher
- Born: August 3, 1959 (age 65); Pine Bluff, Arkansas, U.S.
- Batted: Left Threw: Left

MLB debut
- August 21, 1983, for the Cleveland Indians

Last MLB appearance
- June 24, 1994, for the Florida Marlins

MLB statistics
- Win–loss record: 25–26
- Earned run average: 4.37
- Strikeouts: 242
- Stats at Baseball Reference

Teams
- Cleveland Indians (1983–1985); San Francisco Giants (1985); Texas Rangers (1987–1992); Florida Marlins (1994)

James Michael Jeffcoat (born August 3, 1959) is an American retired professional baseball manager, former head coach in college baseball, and former professional player. He pitched in Major League Baseball (MLB) between 1983 and 1994 for four different teams.

== Playing career ==
Jeffcoat was first selected in the 1977 MLB draft by the St. Louis Cardinals, but did not sign. He played college baseball for Louisiana Tech. He was selected in the 1980 MLB draft by the Cleveland Indians, whom he signed with.

Jeffcoat's professional playing career began in 1980 and ended in 1994, doing which he pitched in 283 games in Minor League Baseball, compiling an 85–59 win–loss record. At the Triple-A level, he had a 58–36 record with 3.91 earned run average (ERA) in 215 games (97 starts).

Jeffcoat pitched in 255 major-league games during parts of 10 seasons. He primarily pitched for the Texas Rangers, pitching 149 games (41 starts) for them during 1987–1992. He pitched to an overall MLB record of 25–26 with a 4.37 ERA, three complete games, and seven saves.

== Coaching career ==
Jeffcoat was the head coach of Texas Wesleyan University from 2002 to 2018. He was terminated in early 2018 following publication of an email in which he stated that he didn't recruit players from the state of Colorado, due to Colorado's marijuana laws, as such players "have had trouble passing our drug test" while also stating "thank your liberal politicians." The university terminated Jeffcoat for "derogatory remarks".

On December 17, 2020, Jeffcoat was hired to be the manager of the Cleburne Railroaders of the American Association of Independent Professional Baseball. On June 30, 2021, he retired as manager of the team.
