= Pittsfield Senators =

Pittsfield Senators Pittsfield Rangers after 1971
- 1970–1975; Pittsfield, Massachusetts

Minor league affiliations
- Previous classes: Double-A (1970–1975)
- League: Eastern League (1970–1975)

Major league affiliations
- Previous teams: Washington Senators (1970–1971); Texas Rangers (1972–1975)

Minor league titles
- Division titles: 1973

Team data
- Previous parks: Wahconah Park

The Pittsfield Senators were a minor league baseball team that played from 1970 to 1975 in the Washington Senators minor league system. In 1972 when the Senators moved to Texas and became the Texas Rangers, Pittsfield changed its name to the Pittsfield Rangers (1972 to 1975).

They were located in Pittsfield, Massachusetts, played in the Double-A Eastern League. Their home ballpark was Wahconah Park, although they also played several home games at Bleecker Stadium in Albany in 1972 and 1973.

The Rangers moved their Double-A affiliate to San Antonio of the Texas League in 1976 and were immediately replaced in Pittsfield by the Milwaukee Brewers, who renamed the team the Berkshire Brewers.

== Yearly record ==
Year	Record	Finish Full Season	Attendance	Manager	Postseason
1970	72–66	Third	49,875	Dick Gernert; Joe Klein	No playoffs held
1971	68–69	Second (American Division)	49,770	Joe Klein	DNQ
1972	66–73	Second (American Division)	47,199	Joe Klein	DNQ
1973	75–61	First (American Division)	44,333	Joe Klein	Lost to Reading in finals
1974	69–70	Second (American Division)	29,234	Joe Klein	Lost to Thetford Mines in finals
1975	66–73	Sixth	34,878	Jackie Moore; Marty Martínez	DNQ

== Future Major Leaguers ==
- Larry Biittner (1970)
- Don Castle (1970)
- Dave Moates (1970–1972)
- Rick Stelmaszek (1970)
- John Wockenfuss (1970–1972)
- Steve Foucault (1970)
- Bill Gogolewski (1970)
- Rick Henninger (1970–1971)
- Jeff Terpko (1970–1971, 1974)
- Mike Thompson (1970)
- Bill Fahey (1971)
- Jim Kremmel (1971–1972)
- Joe Lovitto (1971)
- Bill Madlock (1971–1972)
- Rick Waits (1971–1972)
- Jim Kremmel (1971–1972)
- Lew Beasley (1972–1975)
- Roy Howell (1972–1973)
- Pete Mackanin (1972)
- Greg Pryor (1972, 1974)
- Tom Robson (1972–1973)
- Dave Criscione (1973)
- Mike Cubbage (1973)
- Ken Pape (1973–1974)
- Jim Sundberg (1973)
- Stan Thomas (1973)
- Doug Ault (1974–1975)
- Brian Doyle (1974)
- Ron Pruitt (1974)
- Roy Smalley III (1974)
- Jim Umbarger (1974)
- Len Barker (1975)
- Tommy Boggs (1975)
- Dan Duran (1975)
- Greg Mahlberg (1975)
- John Poloni (1975)
- Keith Smith (1975)
- John Sutton (1975)
- Bump Wills (1975)

== Players with previous Major League experience ==
- Toby Harrah (1970)
- Gene Martin (1970)
- Charley Walters (1971–1972)
- Dick Such (1973)
- Tommy Cruz (1974)
- David Clyde (1975)
- Marty Martínez (1975)
