= 1974 Texas Rangers season =

Major League Baseball season

1974 Texas Rangers
- League: American League
- Division: West
- Ballpark: Arlington Stadium
- City: Arlington, Texas
- Record: 84–76 (.525)
- Divisional place: 2nd
- Owners: Bob Short, Bradford G. Corbett, Amon Carter, Jr., Ray Nasher
- General managers: Dan O'Brien Sr.
- Managers: Billy Martin
- Television: WBAP-TV (Dick Risenhoover, Jimmy Piersall, Burt Hawkins)
- Radio: WBAP (Dick Risenhoover, Bill Mercer)

The 1974 Texas Rangers season was the 14th of the Texas Rangers franchise overall, their 3rd in Arlington as the Rangers, and the 3rd season at Arlington Stadium. The Rangers finished second in the American League West with a record of 84 wins and 76 losses (two rained-out games were never completed). It would be only the second time in franchise history (to that point) that the club finished over .500 and the first since the club relocated to Arlington, Texas. The club became the first team to finish over .500 after two consecutive 100-loss seasons.

== Offseason ==
- October 25, 1973: Bill Madlock and Vic Harris were traded by the Rangers to the Chicago Cubs for Ferguson Jenkins.

== Regular season ==
During the season, Ferguson Jenkins won 25 games for the Rangers, which was Jenkins' personal best for a season and remains the Rangers franchise record for wins by a pitcher in one season. He would also be the third pitcher in the history of the American League to win 25 games in the 20th century and not win the Cy Young Award.

=== Ten Cent Beer Night ===
On June 4, in one of the most remarkably ill-conceived promotions in Major League Baseball history, fans at Cleveland Municipal Stadium for a Cleveland Indians vs. Texas Rangers game were served as many beers as they wanted for just 10¢ each. After numerous instances of drunken fans throwing debris or running onto the field—"streaking" in many instances—the situation boiled over in the 9th inning when a fan ran onto the field and snatched Rangers outfielder Jeff Burroughs' cap and glove. Burroughs' teammates charged out to his aid, followed by hundreds of rioting Cleveland fans who poured out onto the field.

=== Season standings ===
AL West
Team	W	L	Pct.	GB	Home	Road
Oakland Athletics	90	72	.556	—	49‍–‍32	41‍–‍40
Texas Rangers	84	76	.525	5	42‍–‍38	42‍–‍38
Minnesota Twins	82	80	.506	8	48‍–‍33	34‍–‍47
Chicago White Sox	80	80	.500	9	46‍–‍34	34‍–‍46
Kansas City Royals	77	85	.475	13	40‍–‍41	37‍–‍44
California Angels	68	94	.420	22	36‍–‍45	32‍–‍49

=== Record vs. opponents ===
1974 American League record Sources:
Team	BAL	BOS	CAL	CWS	CLE	DET	KC	MIL	MIN	NYY	OAK	TEX
Baltimore	—	10–8	7–5	5–7	12–6	14–4	8–4	8–10	6–6	11–7	6–6	4–8
Boston	8–10	—	4–8	8–4	9–9	11–7	4–8	10–8	6–6	11–7	8–4	5–7
California	5–7	8–4	—	10–8–1	3–9	5–7	8–10	3–9	8–10	3–9	6–12	9–9
Chicago	7–5	4–8	8–10–1	—	8–4	7–5	11–7	8–4	7–11–1	4–8	7–11	9–7–1
Cleveland	6–12	9–9	9–3	4–8	—	9–9	8–4	10–8	6–6	7–11	5–7	4–8
Detroit	4–14	7–11	7–5	5–7	9–9	—	7–5	9–9	3–9	11–7	5–7	5–7
Kansas City	4–8	8–4	10–8	7–11	4–8	5–7	—	11–1	8–10	4–8	8–10	8–10
Milwaukee	10–8	8–10	9–3	4–8	8–10	9–9	1–11	—	6–6	9–9	5–7	7–5
Minnesota	6–6	6–6	10–8	11–7–1	6–6	9–3	10–8	6–6	—	4–8	5–13	9–9
New York	7–11	7–11	9–3	8–4	11–7	7–11	8–4	9–9	8–4	—	7–5	8–4
Oakland	6–6	4–8	12–6	11–7	7–5	7–5	10–8	7–5	13–5	5–7	—	8–10
Texas	8–4	7–5	9–9	7–9–1	8–4	7–5	10–8	5–7	9–9	4–8	10–8	—

=== Notable transactions ===
- April 25, 1974: Mike Kekich was signed as a free agent by the Rangers.
- June 5, 1974: 1974 Major League Baseball draft
  - Tommy Boggs was drafted by the Rangers in the 1st round (2nd pick).
  - Gary Gray was drafted by the Rangers in the 10th round.

=== Roster ===
1974 Texas Rangers
Roster
Pitchers: 30 Lloyd Allen; 22 Jim Bibby; 40 Pete Broberg; 28 Jackie Brown; 32 David Clyde; 24 Steve Dunning; 29 Steve Foucault; 34 Bill Hands; 26 Steve Hargan; 31 Ferguson Jenkins; 16 Jim Merritt; 25 Jim Shellenback; 36 Don Stanhouse; 46 Jeff Terpko; 23 Stan Thomas	Catchers: 8 Dick Billings; 14 Bill Fahey; 2 Duke Sims; 10 Jim Sundberg; Infielders: 18 Larry Brown; 19 Leo Cárdenas; 4 Mike Cubbage; 17 Jim Fregosi; 21 Mike Hargrove; 11 Toby Harrah; 27 Roy Howell; 24 Pete Mackanin; 5 Dave Nelson; 7 Lenny Randle; 38 Tom Robson; 3 Jim Spencer	Outfielders: 20 Jeff Burroughs; 6 Tom Grieve; 15 Alex Johnson; 8 Bobby Jones; 9 Joe Lovitto; 12 César Tovar; Other batters: 30 Dave Moates	Manager: 1 Billy Martin; Coaches: 45 Merl Combs; 41 Art Fowler; 44 Frank Lucchesi; 42 Jackie Moore; 43 Charlie Silvera

== Player stats ==
=== Batting ===
= Indicates team leader

==== Starters by position ====
Note: Pos = Position; G = Games played; AB = At bats; H = Hits; Avg. = Batting average; HR = Home runs; RBI = Runs batted in

Pos.	Player	G	AB	H	Avg.	HR	RBI
C	Jim Sundberg	132	368	91	.247	3	36
1B	Mike Hargrove	131	415	134	.323	4	66
2B	Dave Nelson	121	474	112	.236	3	42
3B	Lenny Randle	151	520	157	.302	1	49
SS	Toby Harrah	161	573	149	.260	21	74
LF	Alex Johnson	114	453	132	.291	4	41
CF	Joe Lovitto	113	283	63	.223	2	26
RF	Jeff Burroughs	152	554	167	.301	25	118
DH	Jim Spencer	118	352	98	.278	7	74

==== Other batters ====
Note: G = Games played; AB = At bats; H = Hits; Avg. = Batting average; HR = Home runs; RBI = Runs batted in

Player	G	AB	H	Avg.	HR	RBI
César Tovar	138	562	164	.292	4	58
Tom Grieve	84	259	66	.255	9	32
Jim Fregosi	78	230	60	.261	12	34
Duke Sims	39	106	22	.208	3	6
Leo Cárdenas	34	92	25	.272	0	7
Larry Brown	54	76	15	.197	0	5
Roy Howell	13	44	11	.250	1	3
Dick Billings	16	31	7	.226	0	0
Bill Fahey	6	16	4	.250	0	0
Mike Cubbage	9	15	0	.000	0	0
Tom Robson	6	13	3	.231	0	2
Pete Mackanin	2	6	1	.167	0	0
Bobby Jones	2	5	0	.000	0	0
Dave Moates	1	0	0	----	0	0

=== Pitching ===
==== Starting pitchers ====
Note: G = Games pitched; IP = Innings pitched; W = Wins; L = Losses; ERA = Earned run average; SO = Strikeouts

Player	G	IP	W	L	ERA	SO
Ferguson Jenkins	41	328.1	25	12	2.82	225
Jim Bibby	41	264.0	19	19	4.74	149
Jackie Brown	35	216.2	13	12	3.57	134
Steve Hargan	37	186.2	12	9	3.95	98
David Clyde	28	117.0	3	9	4.38	52
Bill Hands	2	14.0	2	0	1.93	4

==== Other pitchers ====
Note: G = Games pitched; IP = Innings pitched; W = Wins; L = Losses; ERA = Earned run average; SO = Strikeouts

Player	G	IP	W	L	ERA	SO
Pete Broberg	12	29.0	0	4	8.07	15

==== Relief pitchers ====
Note: G = Games pitched; W = Wins; L = Losses; SV = Saves; ERA = Earned run average; SO = Strikeouts

Player	G	W	L	SV	ERA	SO
Steve Foucault	69	8	9	12	2.24	106
Jim Merritt	26	0	0	0	4.13	18
Don Stanhouse	18	1	1	0	4.88	26
Lloyd Allen	14	0	1	0	6.55	18
Stan Thomas	12	0	0	0	6.59	8
Jim Shellenback	11	0	0	0	5.84	14
Jeff Terpko	3	0	0	0	1.29	3
Steve Dunning	1	0	0	0	19.29	1

== Awards and honors ==
- Jeff Burroughs, AL MVP
- Mike Hargrove, AL Rookie of the Year
- Ferguson Jenkins, Comeback Player of The Year
- Billy Martin, Associated Press AL Manager of the Year

=== All-Stars ===
1974 Major League Baseball All-Star Game

- Jeff Burroughs, left field, starter
- Jim Sundberg, reserve

== Farm system ==
Level	Team	League	Manager
AAA	Spokane Indians	Pacific Coast League	Del Wilber
AA	Pittsfield Rangers	Eastern League	Joe Klein
A	Gastonia Rangers	Western Carolinas League	Rich Donnelly
Rookie	GCL Rangers	Gulf Coast League	Bill Haywood

LEAGUE CHAMPIONS: Spokane, Gastonia
