= 1977 Texas Rangers season =

1977 Texas Rangers
- League: American League
- Division: West
- Ballpark: Arlington Stadium
- City: Arlington, Texas
- Record: 94–68 (.580)
- Divisional place: 2nd
- Owners: Bradford G. Corbett
- General managers: Dan O'Brien Sr. / Eddie Robinson
- Managers: Frank Lucchesi, Eddie Stanky, Connie Ryan, Billy Hunter
- Television: KXAS-TV (Dick Risenhoover, Tom Vandergriff)
- Radio: WBAP (Dick Risenhoover, Bill Merrill)

The 1977 Texas Rangers season was the 17th of the Texas Rangers franchise overall, their 6th in Arlington as the Rangers, and the 6th season at Arlington Stadium. The Rangers finished second in the American League West with a record of 94 wins and 68 losses. The 1977 Rangers were notable for having an American League record four managers in the same season. Frank Lucchesi began the season as the manager but team's board of directors decide to make a change after the Rangers entered June with a .500 record. Former Major League player and manager Eddie Stanky was introduced as the new manager on June 17 but changed his mind after one game and returned to his home in Alabama. Bench coach Connie Ryan served as the interim manager for six games before Billy Hunter was hired and led the team to a 60-33 record for the rest of the year.

== Offseason ==
On December 10, 1976, shortstop Danny Thompson died of leukemia. Thompson had played in 64 games for the Rangers in 1976.

=== Notable transactions ===
- November 17, 1976: Bert Campaneris was signed as a free agent by the Rangers.
- November 23, 1976: Doyle Alexander was signed as a free agent by the Rangers.
- December 9, 1976: Jeff Burroughs was traded by the Rangers to the Atlanta Braves for Carl Morton, Adrian Devine, Ken Henderson, Dave May, Roger Moret, and $250,000.
- December 15, 1976: Dave Criscione was traded by the Rangers to the Baltimore Orioles for Bob Babcock.
- January 11, 1977: Dave Righetti was drafted by the Rangers in the 1st round (10th pick) of the 1977 Major League Baseball draft.
- February 2, 1977: Fritz Peterson was released by the Rangers.
- February 5, 1977: The Rangers traded a player to be named later and cash to the Chicago Cubs for Darold Knowles. The Rangers completed the deal by sending Gene Clines to the Cubs on February 15.
- February 17, 1977: Brian Doyle, Greg Pryor and cash were traded by the Rangers to the New York Yankees for Sandy Alomar Sr.

== Regular season ==
For one June day in 1977, Eddie Stanky was drawn back into the major leagues as manager of the Rangers. After that day, he abruptly quit and left for Alabama, saying only that he was homesick.

=== Season standings ===
AL West
Team	W	L	Pct.	GB	Home	Road
Kansas City Royals	102	60	.630	—	55‍–‍26	47‍–‍34
Texas Rangers	94	68	.580	8	44‍–‍37	50‍–‍31
Chicago White Sox	90	72	.556	12	48‍–‍33	42‍–‍39
Minnesota Twins	84	77	.522	17½	48‍–‍32	36‍–‍45
California Angels	74	88	.457	28	39‍–‍42	35‍–‍46
Seattle Mariners	64	98	.395	38	29‍–‍52	35‍–‍46
Oakland Athletics	63	98	.391	38½	35‍–‍46	28‍–‍52

=== Record vs. opponents ===
1977 American League record Sources:
Team	BAL	BOS	CAL	CWS	CLE	DET	KC	MIL	MIN	NYY	OAK	SEA	TEX	TOR
Baltimore	—	6–8	5–6	5–5	11–4	12–3	4–7	11–4	6–4	8–7	8–2	7–3	4–6	10–5
Boston	8–6	—	7–3	3–7	8–7	9–6	5–5	9–6	4–6	8–7	8–3	10–1	6–4	12–3
California	6–5	3–7	—	8–7	6–4	4–6	6–9	5–5	7–8	4–7	5–10	9–6	5–10	6–4
Chicago	5–5	7–3	7–8	—	6–4	4–6	8–7	6–5	10–5	3–7	10–5	10–5	6–9	8–3
Cleveland	4–11	7–8	4–6	4–6	—	8–7	3–7	11–4	2–9	3–12	7–3	7–3	2–9	9–5
Detroit	3–12	6–9	6–4	6–4	7–8	—	3–8	10–5	5–5	6–9	5–5	5–6	2–8	10–5
Kansas City	7–4	5–5	9–6	7–8	7–3	8–3	—	8–2	10–5	5–5	9–6	11–4	8–7	8–2
Milwaukee	4–11	6–9	5–5	5–6	4–11	5–10	2–8	—	3–8	8–7	5–5	7–3	5–5	8–7
Minnesota	4–6	6–4	8–7	5–10	9–2	5–5	5–10	8–3	—	2–8	8–6	7–8	8–7	9–1
New York	7–8	7–8	7–4	7–3	12–3	9–6	5–5	7–8	8–2	—	9–2	6–4	7–3	9–6
Oakland	2–8	3–8	10–5	5–10	3–7	5–5	6–9	5–5	6–8	2–9	—	7–8	2–13	7–3
Seattle	3–7	1–10	6–9	5–10	3–7	6–5	4–11	3–7	8–7	4–6	8–7	—	9–6	4–6
Texas	6–4	4–6	10–5	9–6	9–2	8–2	7–8	5–5	7–8	3–7	13–2	6–9	—	7–4
Toronto	5–10	3–12	4–6	3–8	5–9	5–10	2–8	7–8	1–9	6–9	3–7	6–4	4–7	—

=== Opening Day starters ===
- Juan Beníquez
- Bert Blyleven
- Bert Campaneris
- Tom Grieve
- Mike Hargrove
- Toby Harrah
- Ken Henderson
- Jim Sundberg
- Claudell Washington
- Bump Wills

=== Notable transactions ===
- April 1, 1977: Carl Morton was released by the Rangers.
- April 12, 1977: Steve Foucault was traded by the Rangers to the Detroit Tigers for Willie Horton.
- April 30, 1977: Mike Marshall was purchased by the Rangers from the Atlanta Braves.
- May 9, 1977: Roy Howell was traded by the Rangers to the Toronto Blue Jays for Jim Mason, Steve Hargan and $200,000.
- May 23, 1977: Dave Moates was purchased from the Rangers by the New York Yankees.
- June 7, 1977: John Butcher was drafted by the Rangers in the 1st round (18th pick) of the secondary phase of the 1977 Major League Baseball draft.
- June 15, 1977: Dock Ellis was purchased by the Rangers from the Oakland Athletics.
- June 15, 1977: Jim Fregosi was traded by the Rangers to the Pittsburgh Pirates for Ed Kirkpatrick.

=== Roster ===
1977 Texas Rangers
Roster
Pitchers: 33 Doyle Alexander; 48 Mike Bacsik; 39 Len Barker; 28 Bert Blyleven; 22 Tommy Boggs; 34 Nelson Briles; 24,53 Bobby Cuellar; 35 Adrian Devine; 17 Dock Ellis; 26 Steve Hargan; 32 Darold Knowles; 25 Paul Lindblad; 31 Mike Marshall; 29,42 Roger Moret; 36 Gaylord Perry; 27 John Poloni; 40 Jim Umbarger; 24 Mike Wallace	Catchers: 9 John Ellis; 14 Bill Fahey; 10 Jim Sundberg; Infielders: 2 Sandy Alomar Sr.; 19 Bert Campaneris; 17 Jim Fregosi; 21 Mike Hargrove; 11 Toby Harrah; 3 Jim Mason; 18 Pat Putnam; 1 Bump Wills	Outfielders: 7 Lew Beasley; 12 Juan Beníquez; 13 Kurt Bevacqua; 24 Gary Gray; 6 Tom Grieve; 20 Ken Henderson; 23 Willie Horton; 13 Roy Howell; 18 Ed Kirkpatrick; 16 Dave May; 30 Eddie Miller; 26 Keith Smith; 15 Claudell Washington	Manager: 5 Billy Hunter; 44 Frank Lucchesi; 8 Connie Ryan; 41 Eddie Stanky; Coaches: 45 Pat Corrales; 54 Sid Hudson; 47 Fred Koenig; 8 Connie Ryan

== Player stats ==
= Indicates team leader

=== Batting ===
==== Starters by position ====
Note: Pos = Position; G = Games played; AB = At bats; H = Hits; Avg. = Batting average; HR = Home runs; RBI = Runs batted in

Pos	Player	G	AB	H	Avg.	HR	RBI
C	Jim Sundberg	149	453	132	.291	6	65
1B	Mike Hargrove	153	525	160	.305	18	69
2B	Bump Wills	152	541	155	.287	9	62
3B	Toby Harrah	159	539	142	.263	27	87
SS	Bert Campaneris	150	552	140	.254	5	46
LF	Claudell Washington	129	521	148	.284	12	68
CF	Juan Beníquez	123	424	114	.269	10	50
RF	Dave May	120	340	82	.241	7	42
DH	Willie Horton	139	519	150	.289	15	75

==== Other batters ====
Note: G = Games played; AB = At bats; H = Hits; Avg. = Batting average; HR = Home runs; RBI = Runs batted in

Player	G	AB	H	Avg.	HR	RBI
Ken Henderson	75	244	63	.258	5	23
Tom Grieve	79	236	53	.225	7	30
John Ellis	49	119	28	.235	4	15
Kurt Bevacqua	39	96	32	.333	5	28
Sandy Alomar Sr.	69	83	22	.265	1	11
Bill Fahey	37	68	15	.221	0	5
Keith Smith	23	67	16	.239	2	6
Jim Mason	36	55	12	.218	1	7
Ed Kirkpatrick	20	48	9	.188	0	3
Lew Beasley	25	32	7	.219	0	3
Jim Fregosi	13	28	7	.250	1	5
Pat Putnam	11	26	8	.308	0	3
Roy Howell	7	17	0	.000	0	0
Eddie Miller	17	6	2	.333	0	1
Gary Gray	1	2	0	.000	0	0

=== Pitching ===
==== Starting pitchers ====
Note: G = Games pitched; IP = Innings pitched; W = Wins; L = Losses; ERA = Earned run average; SO = Strikeouts

Player	G	IP	W	L	ERA	SO
Gaylord Perry	34	238.0	15	12	3.37	177
Doyle Alexander	34	237.0	17	11	3.65	82
Bert Blyleven	30	234.2	14	12	2.72	182
Dock Ellis	23	167.1	10	6	2.90	90
Tommy Boggs	6	27.1	0	3	5.93	15

==== Other pitchers ====
Note: G = Games pitched; IP = Innings pitched; W = Wins; L = Losses; ERA = Earned run average; SO = Strikeouts

Player	G	IP	W	L	ERA	SO
Nelson Briles	28	108.1	6	4	4.24	57
Roger Moret	18	72.1	3	3	3.73	39
Len Barker	15	47.1	4	1	2.66	51
Mike Marshall	12	35.2	2	2	4.04	18
Jim Umbarger	3	13.0	1	1	5.54	5
John Poloni	2	7.0	1	0	6.43	5

==== Relief pitchers ====
Note: G = Games pitched; W = Wins; L = Losses; SV = Saves; ERA = Earned run average; SO = Strikeouts

Player	G	W	L	SV	ERA	SO
Adrian Devine	56	11	6	15	3.58	67
Paul Lindblad	42	4	5	4	4.20	46
Darold Knowles	42	5	2	4	3.22	14
Steve Hargan	6	1	0	0	8.76	10
Mike Wallace	5	0	0	0	7.56	2
Bobby Cuellar	4	0	0	0	1.35	3
Mike Bacsik	2	0	0	0	19.29	1

== Awards and honors ==
- Jim Sundberg, Gold Glove, catcher, 1977
- Juan Beníquez, Gold Glove, outfield, 1977

=== All-Stars ===
All-Star Game

- Bert Campaneris, reserve

=== Other team leaders ===
- Stolen bases – Bump Wills (28)
- Walks – Toby Harrah (109)

== Farm system ==
Level	Team	League	Manager
AAA	Tucson Toros	Pacific Coast League	Rich Donnelly
AA	Tulsa Drillers	Texas League	Marty Martínez
A	Asheville Tourists	Western Carolinas League	Wayne Terwilliger
Rookie	GCL Rangers	Gulf Coast League	Joe Klein
