= List of Texas Rangers minor league affiliates =

Current Texas Rangers domestic minor league affiliate locations

The Texas Rangers farm system consists of seven Minor League Baseball affiliates across the United States and in the Dominican Republic. Four teams are independently owned, while three—the Arizona Complex League Rangers and two Dominican Summer League Rangers squads—are owned by the major league club.

The Rangers have been affiliated with the Double-A Frisco RoughRiders of the Texas League since 2003, making it the longest-running active affiliation in the organization among teams not owned by the Rangers. The longest affiliation in team history was the 28-year relationship with the Triple-A American Association/Pacific Coast League's Oklahoma City 89ers/RedHawks from 1983 to 2010. Their newest affiliate is the Hub City Spartanburgers of the South Atlantic League, which became the Rangers' High-A club in 2025.

Geographically, Texas' closest domestic affiliate is the Frisco RoughRiders, which are approximately 28 miles (45 km) away. Texas' furthest domestic affiliate is the Single-A Hickory Crawdads of the Carolina League some 920 miles (1,480 km) away.

== Current affiliates ==
The Texas Rangers farm system consists of seven minor league affiliates.

Class	Team	League	Location	Ballpark	Affiliated
Triple-A	Round Rock Express	Pacific Coast League	Round Rock, Texas	Dell Diamond	2021
Double-A	Frisco RoughRiders	Texas League	Frisco, Texas	Riders Field	2003
High-A	Hub City Spartanburgers	South Atlantic League	Spartanburg, South Carolina	Fifth Third Park	2025
Single-A	Hickory Crawdads	Carolina League	Hickory, North Carolina	L. P. Frans Stadium	2009
Rookie	ACL Rangers	Arizona Complex League	Surprise, Arizona	Surprise Stadium	2003
Rookie	DSL Rangers Blue	Dominican Summer League	Boca Chica, Santo Domingo	Texas Rangers Dominican Academy	2014
Rookie	DSL Rangers Red	Dominican Summer League	Boca Chica, Santo Domingo	Texas Rangers Dominican Academy	2014

== Past affiliates ==
=== Key ===
Season	Each year is linked to an article about that particular Senators/Rangers season.
*	League champions

=== 1961–1962 ===
Minor League Baseball operated with six classes (Triple-A, Double-A, Class A, Class B, Class C, and Class D) from 1961 to 1962.

Season	Triple-A	Double-A	Class A	Class B	Class C	Class D	Ref.
1961	—	—	—	—	—	Middlesboro Senators; Pensacola Senators	
1962	Syracuse Chiefs (Note: In 1962, the Mets shared the Triple-A Syracuse Chiefs with the Washington Senators.)	—	—	Raleigh Capitals	—	Middlesboro Senators; Pensacola Senators	

=== 1963–1989 ===
Prior to the 1963 season, Major League Baseball (MLB) initiated a reorganization of Minor League Baseball that resulted in a reduction from six classes to four (Triple-A, Double-A, Class A, and Rookie) in response to the general decline of the minors throughout the 1950s and early-1960s when leagues and teams folded due to shrinking attendance caused by baseball fans' preference for staying at home to watch MLB games on television. The only change made within the next 27 years was Class A being subdivided for the first time to form Class A Short Season in 1966.

Season	Triple-A	Double-A	Class A	Class A Short Season	Rookie	Ref(s).
1963	—	York White Roses	Geneva Senators; Peninsula Senators; Wisconsin Rapids Senators	—	—	
1964	Toronto Maple Leafs	York White Roses	Geneva Senators; Rocky Mount Senators	—	—	
1965	Hawaii Islanders	York White Roses	Burlington Senators; Geneva Senators	—	Wytheville Senators	
1966	Hawaii Islanders	York White Roses	Burlington Senators; Geneva Senators	—	—	
1967	Hawaii Islanders	York White Roses	Burlington Senators	Geneva Senators	—	
1968	Buffalo Bisons	Savannah Senators	Burlington Senators; Salisbury Senators	Geneva Senators	—	
1969	Buffalo Bisons	Savannah Senators (Note: In 1969, the Senators shared the Double-A Savannah Senators with the Houston Astros.)	Burlington Senators; Shelby Senators	—	Wytheville Senators	
1970	Denver Bears	Pittsfield Senators	Anderson Senators; Burlington Senators	Geneva Senators	—	
1971	Denver Bears*	Pittsfield Senators	Anderson Senators; Burlington Senators	Geneva Senators	—	
1972	Denver Bears	Pittsfield Rangers	Burlington Rangers; Greenville Rangers	Geneva Senators	—	
1973	Spokane Indians*	Pittsfield Rangers	Gastonia Rangers	—	GCL Rangers*	
1974	Spokane Indians*	Pittsfield Rangers	Gastonia Rangers*	—	GCL Rangers	
1975	Spokane Indians	Pittsfield Rangers	Anderson Rangers; Lynchburg Rangers	—	GCL Rangers*	
1976	Sacramento Solons	San Antonio Brewers	Asheville Tourists	—	GCL Rangers*	
1977	Tucson Toros	Tulsa Drillers	Asheville Tourists	—	GCL Rangers	
1978	Tucson Toros	Tulsa Drillers	Asheville Tourists	—	GCL Rangers*	
1979	Tucson Toros	Tulsa Drillers	Asheville Tourists	—	GCL Rangers	
1980	Charleston Charlies	Tulsa Drillers	Asheville Tourists	—	GCL Rangers	
1981	Wichita Aeros	Tulsa Drillers	Asheville Tourists	—	GCL Rangers	
1982	Denver Bears	Tulsa Drillers*	Burlington Rangers	—	GCL Rangers	
1983	Oklahoma City 89ers	Tulsa Drillers	Burlington Rangers	Tri-Cities Triplets	GCL Rangers	
1984	Oklahoma City 89ers	Tulsa Drillers	Burlington Rangers; Salem Redbirds	Tri-Cities Triplets	GCL Rangers	
1985	Oklahoma City 89ers	Tulsa Drillers	Burlington Rangers; Salem Redbirds	—	GCL Rangers	
1986	Oklahoma City 89ers	Tulsa Drillers	Daytona Beach Admirals; Salem Redbirds	—	GCL Rangers	
1987	Oklahoma City 89ers	Tulsa Drillers	Gastonia Rangers; Port Charlotte Rangers	—	GCL Rangers	
1988	Oklahoma City 89ers	Tulsa Drillers*	Gastonia Rangers; Port Charlotte Rangers	—	Butte Copper Kings; GCL Rangers	
1989	Oklahoma City 89ers	Tulsa Drillers	Gastonia Rangers; Port Charlotte Rangers*	—	Butte Copper Kings; GCL Rangers; DSL Rangers/White Sox/Astros	

=== 1990–2020 ===
Minor League Baseball operated with six classes from 1990 to 2020. In 1990, the Class A level was subdivided for a second time with the creation of Class A-Advanced. The Rookie level consisted of domestic and foreign circuits.

Season	Triple-A	Double-A	Class A-Advanced	Class A	Class A Short Season	Rookie	Foreign Rookie	Ref(s).
1990	Oklahoma City 89ers	Tulsa Drillers	Port Charlotte Rangers	Gastonia Rangers	—	Butte Copper Kings; GCL Rangers	DSL Rangers	
1991	Oklahoma City 89ers	Tulsa Drillers	Port Charlotte Rangers	Gastonia Rangers	—	Butte Copper Kings; GCL Rangers	DSL Rangers	
1992	Oklahoma City 89ers*	Tulsa Drillers	Port Charlotte Rangers	Gastonia Rangers	—	Butte Copper Kings; GCL Rangers	DSL Rangers/Marlins	
1993	Oklahoma City 89ers	Tulsa Drillers	Port Charlotte Rangers	Charleston Rainbows	Erie Sailors	GCL Rangers*	DSL Rangers/Cubs	
1994	Oklahoma City 89ers	Tulsa Drillers	Port Charlotte Rangers	Charleston RiverDogs	Hudson Valley Renegades	GCL Rangers	DSL Rangers/Braves	
1995	Oklahoma City 89ers	Tulsa Drillers	Port Charlotte Rangers	Charleston RiverDogs	Hudson Valley Renegades	GCL Rangers	DSL Rangers	
1996	Oklahoma City 89ers*	Tulsa Drillers	Port Charlotte Rangers	Charleston RiverDogs	—	GCL Rangers	DSL Rangers	
1997	Oklahoma City 89ers	Tulsa Drillers	Port Charlotte Rangers	—	—	Pulaski Rangers; GCL Rangers	DSL Rangers 1 DSL Rangers 2	
1998	Oklahoma RedHawks	Tulsa Drillers*	Port Charlotte Rangers	Savannah Sand Gnats	—	Pulaski Rangers; GCL Rangers*	DSL Rangers	
1999	Oklahoma RedHawks	Tulsa Drillers	Port Charlotte Rangers	Savannah Sand Gnats	—	Pulaski Rangers; GCL Rangers	DSL Rangers	
2000	Oklahoma RedHawks	Tulsa Drillers	Port Charlotte Rangers	Savannah Sand Gnats	—	Pulaski Rangers; GCL Rangers*	DSL Rangers	
2001	Oklahoma RedHawks	Tulsa Drillers	Port Charlotte Rangers	Savannah Sand Gnats	—	Pulaski Rangers; GCL Rangers	DSL Rangers	
2002	Oklahoma RedHawks	Tulsa Drillers	Port Charlotte Rangers*	Savannah Sand Gnats	—	Pulaski Rangers; GCL Rangers	DSL Rangers	
2003	Oklahoma RedHawks	Frisco RoughRiders	Stockton Ports	Clinton LumberKings	Spokane Indians*	AZL Rangers	DSL Rangers	
2004	Oklahoma RedHawks	Frisco RoughRiders*	Stockton Ports	Clinton LumberKings	Spokane Indians	AZL Rangers	DSL Rangers	
2005	Oklahoma RedHawks	Frisco RoughRiders	Bakersfield Blaze	Clinton LumberKings	Spokane Indians*	AZL Rangers	DSL Rangers	
2006	Oklahoma RedHawks	Frisco RoughRiders	Bakersfield Blaze	Clinton LumberKings	Spokane Indians	AZL Rangers	DSL Rangers	
2007	Oklahoma RedHawks	Frisco RoughRiders	Bakersfield Blaze	Clinton LumberKings	Spokane Indians	AZL Rangers	DSL Rangers	
2008	Oklahoma RedHawks	Frisco RoughRiders	Bakersfield Blaze	Clinton LumberKings	Spokane Indians*	AZL Rangers	DSL Rangers 1 DSL Rangers 2	
2009	Oklahoma City RedHawks	Frisco RoughRiders	Bakersfield Blaze	Hickory Crawdads	Spokane Indians	AZL Rangers	DSL Rangers 1 DSL Rangers 2	
2010	Oklahoma City RedHawks	Frisco RoughRiders	Bakersfield Blaze	Hickory Crawdads	Spokane Indians	AZL Rangers	DSL Rangers	
2011	Round Rock Express	Frisco RoughRiders	Myrtle Beach Pelicans	Hickory Crawdads	Spokane Indians	AZL Rangers	DSL Rangers	
2012	Round Rock Express	Frisco RoughRiders	Myrtle Beach Pelicans	Hickory Crawdads	Spokane Indians	AZL Rangers*	DSL Rangers	
2013	Round Rock Express	Frisco RoughRiders	Myrtle Beach Pelicans	Hickory Crawdads	Spokane Indians	AZL Rangers	DSL Rangers*	
2014	Round Rock Express	Frisco RoughRiders	Myrtle Beach Pelicans	Hickory Crawdads	Spokane Indians	AZL Rangers	DSL Rangers 1* DSL Rangers 2	
2015	Round Rock Express	Frisco RoughRiders	High Desert Mavericks	Hickory Crawdads*	Spokane Indians	AZL Rangers	DSL Rangers 1 DSL Rangers 2	
2016	Round Rock Express	Frisco RoughRiders	High Desert Mavericks*	Hickory Crawdads	Spokane Indians	AZL Rangers	DSL Rangers 1 DSL Rangers 2	
2017	Round Rock Express	Frisco RoughRiders	Down East Wood Ducks*	Hickory Crawdads	Spokane Indians	AZL Rangers	DSL Rangers 1 DSL Rangers 2	
2018	Round Rock Express	Frisco RoughRiders	Down East Wood Ducks	Hickory Crawdads	Spokane Indians	AZL Rangers	DSL Rangers 1 DSL Rangers 2	
2019	Nashville Sounds	Frisco RoughRiders	Down East Wood Ducks	Hickory Crawdads	Spokane Indians	AZL Rangers*	DSL Rangers 1 DSL Rangers 2	
2020 (Note: The 2020 Minor League Baseball season was cancelled due to the COVID-19 pandemic.)	Nashville Sounds	Frisco RoughRiders	Down East Wood Ducks	Hickory Crawdads	Spokane Indians	AZL Rangers	DSL Rangers 1 DSL Rangers 2	

=== 2021–present ===
The current structure of Minor League Baseball is the result of an overall contraction of the system beginning with the 2021 season. Class A was reduced to two levels: High-A and Low-A. Low-A was reclassified as Single-A in 2022.

Season	Triple-A	Double-A	High-A	Single-A	Rookie	Foreign Rookie	Ref.
2021	Round Rock Express	Frisco RoughRiders	Hickory Crawdads	Down East Wood Ducks	ACL Rangers	DSL Rangers 1 DSL Rangers 2	
2022	Round Rock Express	Frisco RoughRiders*	Hickory Crawdads	Down East Wood Ducks	ACL Rangers	DSL Rangers Blue; DSL Rangers Red	
2023	Round Rock Express	Frisco RoughRiders	Hickory Crawdads	Down East Wood Ducks	ACL Rangers	DSL Rangers Blue; DSL Rangers Red	
2024	Round Rock Express	Frisco RoughRiders	Hickory Crawdads	Down East Wood Ducks	ACL Rangers	DSL Rangers Blue; DSL Rangers Red	
2025	Round Rock Express	Frisco RoughRiders	Hub City Spartanburgers	Hickory Crawdads	ACL Rangers	DSL Rangers Blue; DSL Rangers Red	
2026	Round Rock Express	Frisco RoughRiders	Hub City Spartanburgers	Hickory Crawdads	ACL Rangers	DSL Rangers Blue; DSL Rangers Red	
