= Sharnol Adriana =

Curaçaoan-Dutch baseball player and coach

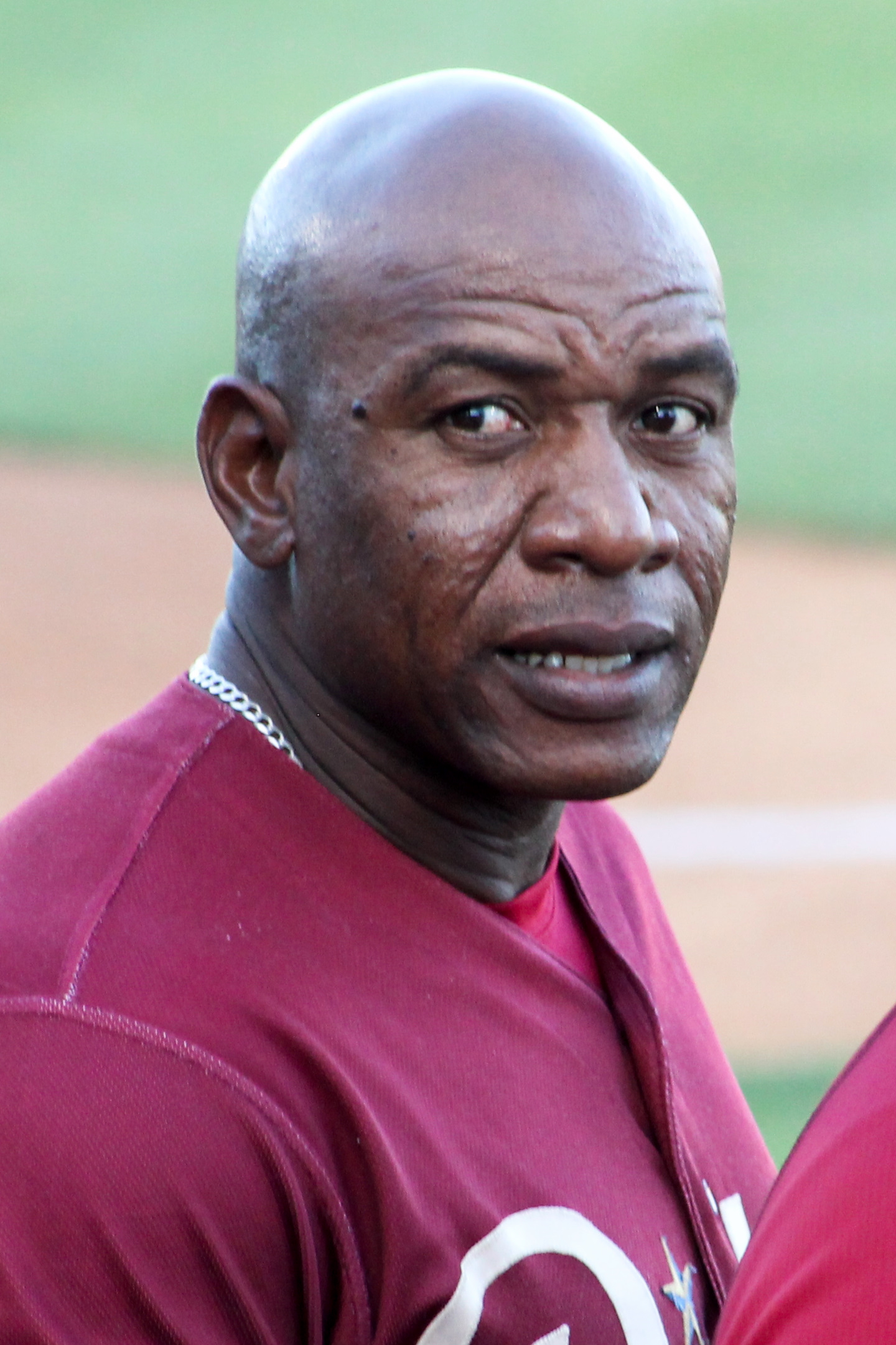
- Adriana coaching the Frisco RoughRiders in 2016
- Infielder / Coach
- Born: 13 November 1970 (age 55); Willemstad, Curaçao
- Bats: Right Throws: Right
- Stats at Baseball Reference
Medals
Men's baseball
Representing Netherlands
Intercontinental Cup
Silver medal – second place	2006 Taiwan	National team
European Baseball Championship
Gold medal – first place	2003 Netherlands	National team
Gold medal – first place	2007 Netherlands	National team

Sharnol Leonard Adriana (born 13 November 1970) is a Curaçaoan baseball coach and former player. He spent several minor league seasons in the Toronto Blue Jays organization before moving to the Mexican League. He played for the Netherlands national team at the Summer Olympics in 2000, 2004, and 2008 and at the 2006 and 2009 World Baseball Classic (WBC).

Adriana is currently a roving hitting coach for the Texas Rangers and a hitting coach for the Dutch national team in the 2026 WBC.

== Playing career ==
Adriana played Little League Baseball in Curaçao. He later played college baseball at Martin Methodist College.

=== Toronto Blue Jays (minors) ===
The Toronto Blue Jays selected Adriana in the 15th round of the 1991 MLB draft. The Blue Jays assigned him to their St. Catharines Blue Jays farm team that summer, where he had a .206/.311/.341 slash line as the regular shortstop. In 1992, he was the second baseman for the Dunedin Blue Jays and he hit .276/.369/.333. In 1993, the 22-year-old was struggling with the Double-A Knoxville Smokies, where his line was.215/.308/.243. He reached Triple-A in 1994 and continued playing in Toronto's minor league system through 1998.

Adriana played for the Newark Bears of the independent Atlantic League in 1999, batting .334 with 16 home runs in 119 games. He was a league All-Star.

=== Mexican League ===
Adriana moved to the Mexican League in 2000, returning to Newark for five games, batting 2-for-17. Splitting the year between the Cafeteros de Córdoba and the Piratas de Campeche, he had a .326/.436/.603 line, stole 24 in 36 tries, homered 29 times, and led the league with 113 runs scored.

In 2001, Adriana had another 20–20 season, with his 28 homers five shy of league leader Boi Rodriguez, along with 21 steals. He batted .313 and slugging .581 for Campeche while scoring 89 runs. He also batted .254 with four homers for Newark. In 2002, he again split time between Campeche and Córdoba, hitting .317/.378/.517 in 94 games for the two teams. He batted .301/.403/.488 for Cordoba in 2003.

Adriana played for the Leones de Yucatán and Acereros de Monclova in 2004 and continued his strong offense, hitting .297/ with 7 homers and 4 stolen bases. Adriana's power returned in 2005, as the 34-year-old hit .368/.452/.634 for the Tuneros de San Luis Potosí, leading the league with 105 runs, 277 total bases, and 21 caught stealing attempts while swiping 32 bases and smacking 25 homers. He split time between the Tuneros and Calgary Vipers of the Northern League in 2006, hitting over .300 for both teams. He committed four errors in a game on April 26, tying a Mexican League record. He played for Dorados de Chihuahua and Olmecas de Tabasco in 2007, hitting .351 with 10 home runs in 102 games.

Aside from missing the 2010 season, Adriana continued to play in Mexico until 2014, primarily for Petroleros de Minatitlán and Rojos del Águila de Veracruz. He also played briefly for Broncos de Reynosa in 2014. He ended his Mexican League career with a .325 batting average, 195 home runs, 183 stolen bases, all of which are on the league's all-time leaderboards.

Adriana also played parts of several seasons for Neptunus in the Dutch Honkbal Hoofdklasse. He won a Holland Series title with the Rotterdam team in 2009.

== International career ==
Adriana has played for the Netherlands national team in many international competitions.

=== Olympics ===
Adriana was on the Dutch squad for the 2000, 2004, and 2008 Summer Olympics, when the team finished fifth, sixth, and seventh, respectively. In 2000 in Sydney, he hit two home runs but batted .117 in seven games. In 2004 in Athens, he hit .182 with one home run.

In the 2008 Olympics in Beijing, as the captain of the Dutch squad, the first baseman hit .217/.250/.391 with two runs and one RBI in 7 games. He had the third-best on-base plus slugging on a poor-hitting team. He hit a solo homer against Weiliang Li in a win over China and got their lone hit, a seventh inning single, in a loss to Stephen Strasburg and United States.

=== World Baseball Classic ===
In the 2006 World Baseball Classic (WBC), Adriana went 2-for-6 with a double and RBI, playing first base in two games. Adriana was a designated hitter (DH) in the 2009 WBC, batting .250 with 1 RBI in six games.

=== Other competitions ===
In the 2001 Baseball World Cup, Adriana hit .188 with 2 doubles and five walks as the Dutch team's DH. During the 2002 Intercontinental Cup, Adriana hit .350 no exta base hits and three walks in five games.

Adriana was named the best hitter in the 2003 European Baseball Championship, hitting .500/.606/.583 for the champion Dutch squad. He scored 9 runs in 8 games with 7 walks, two behind leader Claudio Liverziani.

Adriana hit .391/.407/1.043 in the 2003 Baseball World Cup with 10 RBI, 6 runs, 3 doubles, and four homers in six games. He hit three homers in a mercy rule-shortened win over France. He became the third player in Cup history to hit three homers in a game, following Antonio Muñoz (1980) and Luis Casanova (1990). Adriana was named the tournament's best first baseman and tied for third in homers, one behind Takashi Yoshiura and Audes de Leon.

In the 2005 Baseball World Cup, he hit .273/.314/.576 with 13 RBI in 10 games.

In the 2006 Intercontinental Cup, he hit .405/.511/.568 with 11 RBI in nine games. He was second to Yoandry Urgellés in RBI and made the all-tournament team at first base.

Adriana was named the best DH of the 2007 European championship, batting .400 with one home run in 8 games. At the subsequent World Cup, he hit .316 with one home run in 10 games. In the next World Cup in 2009, he hit .250 in a bench role.

== Coaching career ==
Adriana was a hitting coach for El Águila de Veracruz in the Mexican League in 2015. He became the manager of the team in late May when Hector Estrada was fired. Adriana then became a hitting coach in the Texas Rangers minor league system, coaching the Frisco RoughRidgers, Hickory Crawdads, Dominican Summer League Rangers, and Arizona League Rangers. He is currently a roving hitting coach, having worked with both Rangers major league and minor league batters in 2023 and 2024.

Adriana coached the Netherlands national team beginning with the 2018 Super 6 tournament. The Dutch baseball federation, the KNBSB, gave Adriana the Bill Arce Award in 2019, as the most promising coach that year. He coached the 2019 European championship-winning team and the Dutch team in the 2019 WBSC Premier12. He was an assistant hitting coach for the 2023 World Baseball Classic (WBC) and a hitting coach for the 2026 WBC.
