= List of Washington Senators seasons =

List of Washington Senators seasons may refer to:

- List of Minnesota Twins seasons, which includes the seasons of the original Washington Senators (1901–1960) before they moved to Minnesota for the 1961 season
- List of Texas Rangers seasons, which includes the seasons of the expansion Washington Senators (1961–1971) before they moved to Texas for the 1972 season

== See also ==
- Category:Washington Senators (1891–1899) seasons
