= 1978 United States Senate special election in Minnesota =

- November 7, 1978
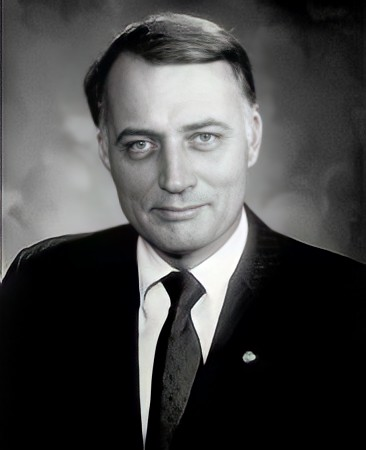

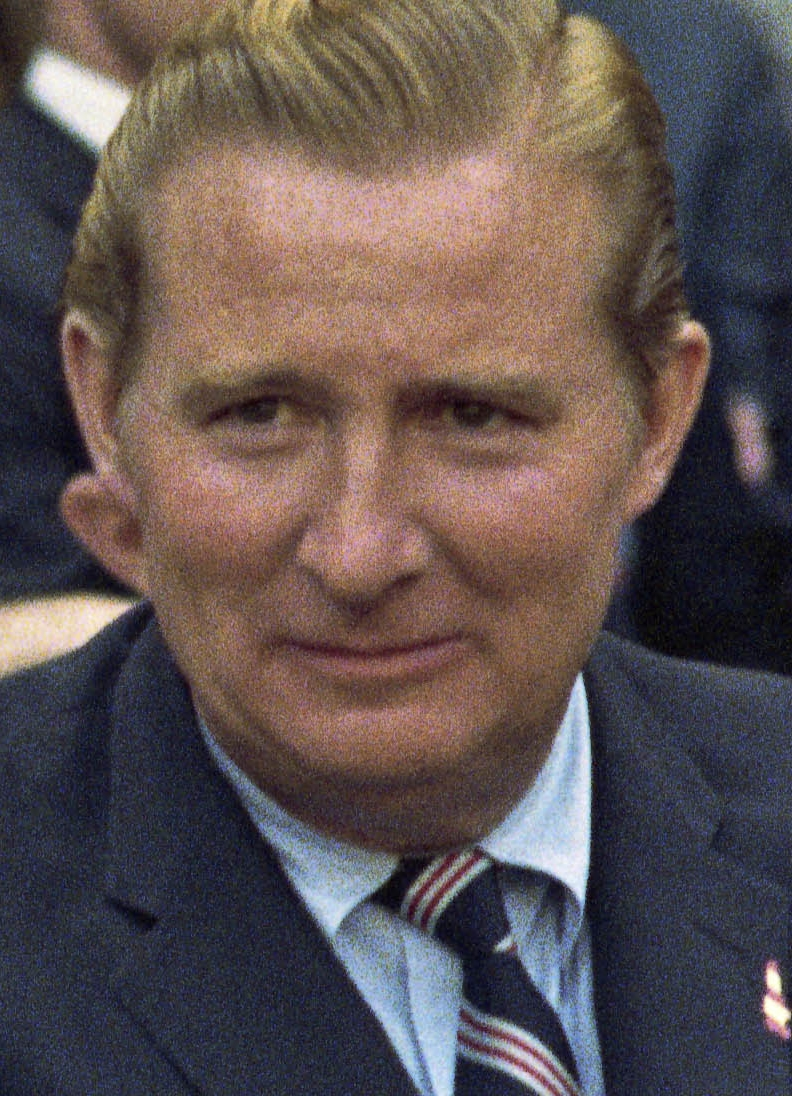
Nominee	David Durenberger	Bob Short
Party	Ind.-Republican	Democratic (DFL)
Popular vote	957,908	538,675
Percentage	61.47%	34.57%
- County results Durenberger: 40–50% 50–60% 60–70% 70–80% Short: 40–50% 50–60% 60–70%
U.S. senator before election
Muriel Humphrey
Democratic (DFL)
Elected U.S. Senator
David Durenberger
Ind.-Republican

The 1978 United States Senate special election in Minnesota was held on November 7, 1978. Democratic candidate Bob Short was defeated by Republican candidate David Durenberger.

== Summary ==
In 1978, all three key statewide races in Minnesota were up for election—the governorship, and both Senate seats (the other Senate seat belonged to Wendell Anderson, who, as Governor of Minnesota, resigned his office in order to be appointed by his successor to fill the seat vacated by Walter Mondale, when Mondale resigned in order to become Vice President of the United States in 1977). But, there was a particular oddity to the three races—all three had incumbents who were never elected to the office in the first place. This became a well played issue by the Republicans—a billboard put up across the state read, "The DFL is going to face something scary -- an election".

When Hubert Humphrey died in office in January 1978, sitting Governor Rudy Perpich appointed Humphrey's widow, Muriel to sit until a special election could be held later that year. However, Muriel Humphrey opted not to seek election to the seat in her own right, and the DFL nominated former Texas Rangers owner Bob Short to run in the subsequent special election. Short was rather conservative by DFL standards of the time, and his positions on hot button issues such as abortion, motorboat usage in the Boundary Waters Canoe area, and government spending gave more liberal DFLers pause.

The Independent-Republicans, for their part, nominated the liberal Republican David Durenberger, creating an unusual race in which the Independent-Republican candidate ran to the left of the DFL candidate. In addition to the general sense of dissatisfaction voters felt for the DFL, the party also had to contend with a large number of liberal DFLers crossing party lines to vote for Durenberger. As a result, Durenberger won in a 26.9-percent landslide as the governorship and both U.S. Senate seats switched into Republican hands.

The results in Minnesota marked the first time the GOP had held all three offices since Joseph H. Ball left the Senate in January 1949. Additionally, this election and the regular election both marked the first time since 1958 that both Senate seats in a state flipped from one party to the other in a single election cycle.

== Democratic–Farmer–Labor primary ==
=== Candidates ===
==== Declared ====
- Sharon Anderson
- Donald M. Fraser, United States Representative from Minnesota's 5th congressional district
- Richard A. Palmer
- Bob Short, Businessman and former owner of the Texas Rangers

=== Results ===
Democratic special primary election results
Party	Candidate	Votes	%
Democratic (DFL)	Bob Short	257,289	48.0%
Democratic (DFL)	Donald M. Fraser	253,818	47.4%
Democratic (DFL)	Sharon Anderson	16,094	3.0%
Democratic (DFL)	Richard A. Palmer	8,425	1.6%
Total votes		535,626	100.0%

== Independent-Republican primary ==
=== Candidates ===
==== Declared ====
- Adell H. Campbell, accountant
- David Durenberger, attorney, counsel of H.B. Fuller, member of the Minnesota State Ethical Practices Board
- Will Lundquist
- Malcolm Moos, Former President of the University of Minnesota
- Ken Nordstrom

=== Results ===
Republican special primary election results
Party	Candidate	Votes	%
Ind.-Republican	David Durenberger	139,187	67.3%
Ind.-Republican	Malcolm Moos	32,314	15.6%
Ind.-Republican	Ken Nordstrom	14,635	7.1%
Ind.-Republican	Will Lundquist	12,261	5.9%
Ind.-Republican	Adell H. Campbell	8,523	4.1%
Total votes		206,920	100.0%

== American Party primary ==
=== Candidates ===
==== Declared ====
- Paul Helm

=== Results ===
American Party special primary election results
Party	Candidate	Votes	%
American	Paul Helm	4,585	100.0%
Total votes		4,585	100.0%

== Special election ==
=== Results ===
Special election results
Party	Candidate	Votes	%
Ind.-Republican	David Durenberger	957,908	61.47%
Democratic (DFL)	Bob Short	538,675	34.57%
American	Paul Helm	45,402	2.91%
Socialist Workers	Christine Frank	11,397	0.73%
Libertarian	Frederick Hewitt	4,116	0.26%
Others	Write-ins	878	0.06%
Total votes		1,558,376	100.00%
Majority		399,233	25.62%
Turnout		1,558,376	62.06%
Ind.-Republican gain from Democratic (DFL)			

== See also ==
- 1978 United States Senate elections
