= Bob Short =

American lawyer

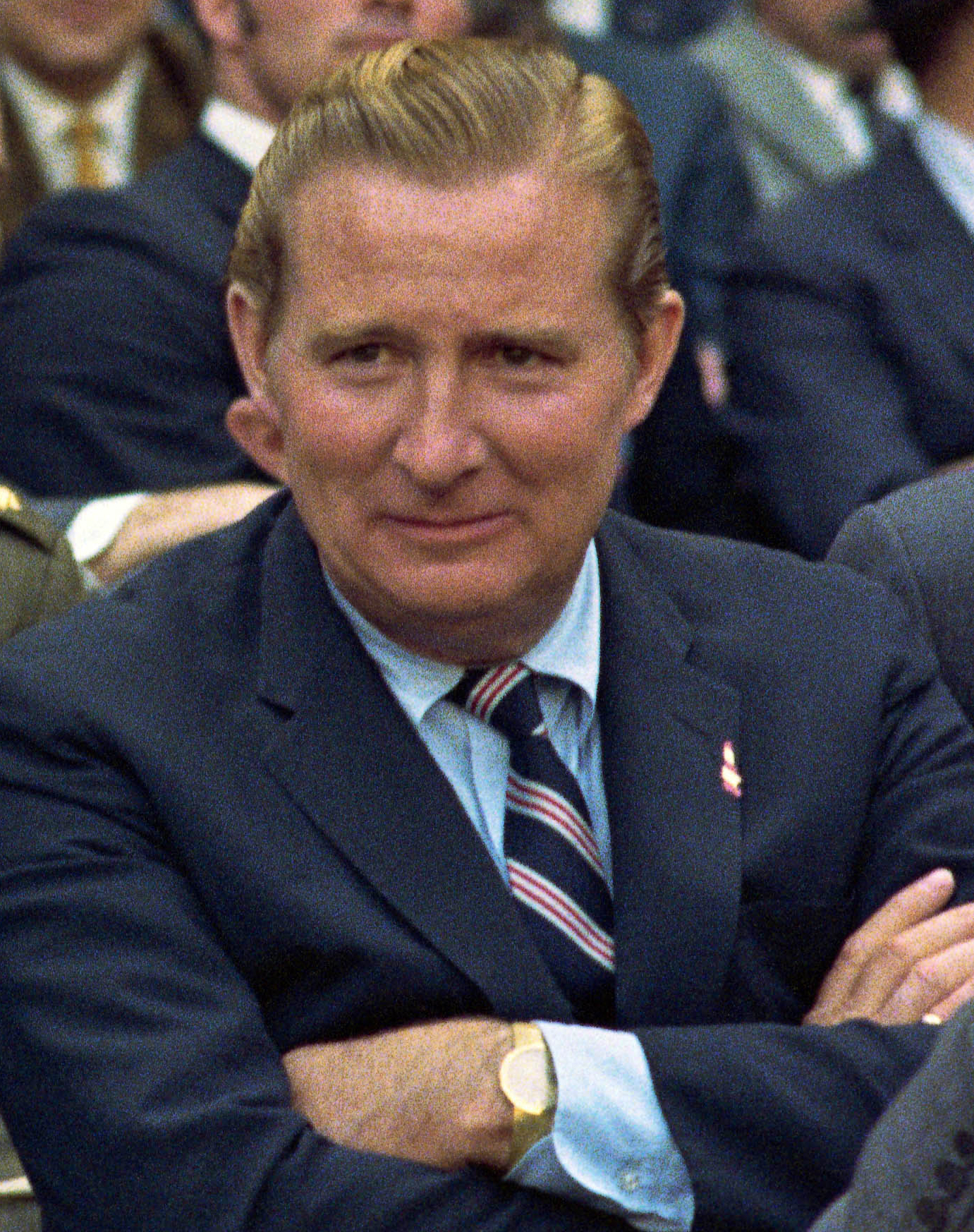
- Short in 1969

Treasurer of the Democratic National Committee
- In office August 1968 – March 12, 1969
- Preceded by: John Criswell
- Succeeded by: Patrick J. O'Connor

Personal details
- Born: Robert Earl Short; July 20, 1917 Minneapolis, Minnesota, U.S.
- Died: November 20, 1982 (aged 65) Hennepin County, Minnesota, U.S
- Resting place: Resurrection Cemetery, Mendota Heights, Minnesota
- Spouse: Marion D. McCann (1948–2022)
- Education: University of St. Thomas; Georgetown University
- Occupation: businessman
- Known for: Owner of the Minneapolis / Los Angeles Lakers and Washington Senators / Texas Rangers

Robert Earl Short (July 20, 1917 – November 20, 1982) was an American businessman, sport teams owner, and politician. Short owned the Minneapolis / Los Angeles Lakers of the National Basketball Association and the Washington Senators / Texas Rangers of Major League Baseball. He served as the treasurer of the Democratic National Committee from 1968 to 1969.

== Background ==
Short graduated from the College of Saint Thomas (now the University of St. Thomas) in Saint Paul, Minnesota, before receiving his law degree from Georgetown University Law Center in Washington, D.C. In 1942, he enlisted in the United States Navy during World War II, and rose from ensign to commander before resigning in 1946. In 1948, he married Marion D. McCann and they settled in suburban Edina and raised seven children.

Short practiced law for several years and started to invest in business ventures after buying an interest in Mueller Transportation, a small trucking line. He built the company into a major freight carrier known as Admiral Merchants Motor Freight, then expanded into real estate and the hotel business. He later purchased two professional sports teams.

Short was a longtime supporter of the University of Notre Dame and served as a member of its Law School Advisory Council from 1974 until his death in 1982, when he was succeeded by his wife in both business and at Notre Dame (she also served nine years on the board of trustees of what became the University of Saint Thomas). He endowed the Robert and Marion Short Chair in Law at Notre Dame Law School, which his son attended.

== Sports ownership ==
Short bought the Minneapolis Lakers of the National Basketball Association in 1957 and moved the team to Los Angeles in 1960 due to terrible attendance (George Mikan had retired in the mid-1950s) in the Twin Cities. The Lakers immediately resumed their winning ways in L.A., resulting in increased attendance and revenue, and Short sold the team in 1965 to Canadian magnate Jack Kent Cooke.

The original Washington Senators baseball franchise had moved to Minnesota in 1961 due to dwindling attendance (to become the Minnesota Twins). In late 1968, Short outbid comedian Bob Hope for the second (expansion) version of the Senators, buying the team for $9.4 million. The Senators had just finished in the American League basement and were last in the majors in attendance. Short immediately made himself his own general manager and hired Hall of Famer Ted Williams—the major leagues' last .400 hitter—as its field manager for 1969.

Miraculously, the '69 Senators improved by 21 games and posted 86 victories en route to a fourth-place finish in the American League East–the only winning season the expansion-era version of the club experienced in its 11-year lifespan. Williams coaxed career-best batting averages out of a number of Washington hitters. With a winning team, Williams as a drawing card, and the All-Star Game at Robert F. Kennedy Stadium, the Senators almost doubled their 1968 attendance, to over 918,000 paid spectators.

But it was a one-year wonder; the 1970 edition won only 70 games and fell into the AL East basement. Players began to complain about Williams' approach to managing; after the initial success, he reportedly lost interest. Short dealt his best starting pitcher and the left side of his infield (third baseman Aurelio Rodríguez, shortstop Ed Brinkman, and pitchers Joe Coleman and Jim Hannan) to the Detroit Tigers for former Cy Young Award and 30-game-winner Denny McLain, who had spent most of the 1970 campaign suspended because of gambling allegations. The trade helped transform Detroit back into contenders, while McLain lost a league-worst 22 games due to an abused pitching arm that was never the same. It was alleged by onetime Senators broadcaster Shelby Whitfield that the trade was made to secure the Tigers' vote in favor of the attendance-starved Senators' eventual move to Texas, but Short was unaware of the condition of McLain's arm at the time of the trade.

The McLain deal was one of many questionable trades made by Short after the 1969 season; most were made to service the massive debt he'd incurred to buy the team. With the Senators' attendance dwindling back to near-1968 levels, Short issued an ultimatum–unless someone was willing to buy the Senators for $12.4 million, he would move the team elsewhere. When no credible offers surfaced from Washington-area interests, Short successfully petitioned the AL to move the franchise to Arlington, Texas, where it became the Texas Rangers in 1972.

The Senators' move to Texas made Short an unpopular figure in Washington sports. During the final Senators game at RFK Stadium on Thursday, September 30, 1971, the fans let their feelings be known; they unfurled two giant "Short Stinks" banners, and then stormed the field near the end of the game, resulting in a Senators forfeit.

Short is also remembered in Texas for drafting high-school phenom David Clyde in 1973 and then acceding to Clyde's insistence that he pitch two games with the Rangers before being assigned to the minor leagues. After Clyde pitched well in those two starts and drew huge crowds, Short kept Clyde with the Rangers, in an effort to draw crowds for the cellar-dwelling Rangers. This impeded Clyde's development, and his career slowly fizzled. He injured his arm in 1974, spent some time in the minors, and retired in 1981.

The Rangers went into rebuilding mode under young manager Whitey Herzog, but when the Detroit Tigers fired Billy Martin, Short quickly replaced Herzog with Martin, who immediately turned the Rangers around, piloting them to second place in 1974. Short wasn't with the Rangers at season's end, having sold the franchise for $9.5 million on May 29 to an investment group led by Brad Corbett.

Short was Bob Lurie's original investment partner in an attempt to purchase the San Francisco Giants from Horace Stoneham in order to prevent the franchise's sale and move to Toronto. However, the deal foundered when both Lurie and the National League owners insisted that Lurie be recognized as the primary owner who would cast the Giants' vote at league meetings. Lurie believed that since he lived in San Francisco and Short lived in Minneapolis, he should be the senior member of the partnership. For their part, the other NL owners had misgivings about Short's tenure with the Senators/Rangers, and were not willing to approve the deal if Short were the principal owner. Short refused to agree to these terms and pulled out of the partnership. With hours to go before a league-imposed deadline, Lurie replaced Short with Phoenix, Arizona-based meat-packer Bud Herseth, and the $8 million deal was approved by the other league owners on March 2, 1976.

== Political career ==
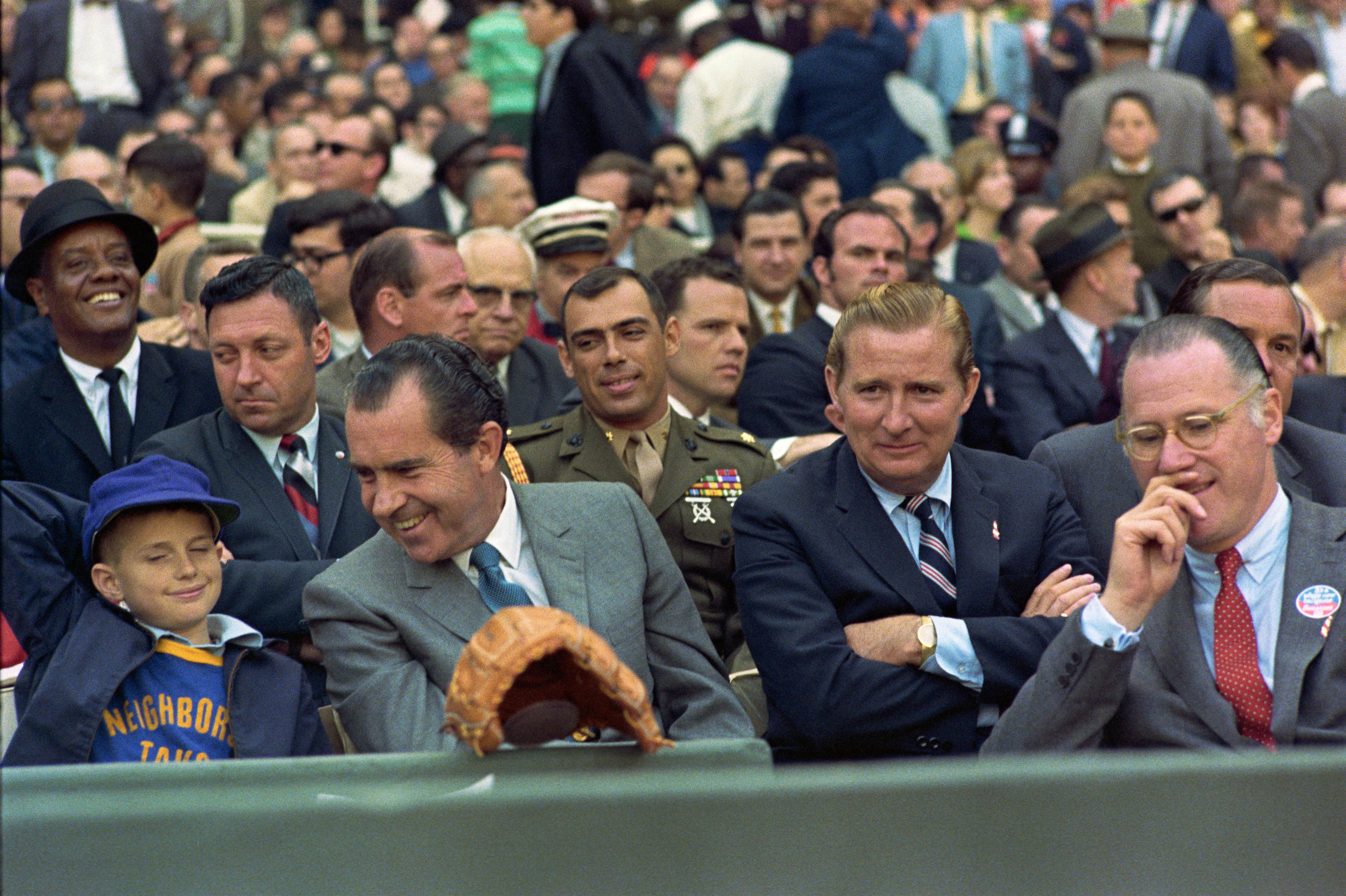
Washington Senators owner Bob Short (with arms folded) with President Nixon and Bowie Kuhn on opening day in 1969

Short first ran unsuccessfully for U.S. Congress in 1946, and in 1966 he lost a run for lieutenant governor in Minnesota. He also served as treasurer of the Democratic National Committee during Hubert Humphrey's 1968 presidential campaign, remaining involved in the DNC for a number of years. His best-known campaign was for the United States Senate in 1978. Short was a close friend of Humphrey and ran for his seat after Humphrey's death. He narrowly upset Congressman (later Minneapolis mayor) Donald M. Fraser in the Democratic primary, but lost the general election to Republican David Durenberger with only 35% of the vote.

During the 1978 campaign, Short was hindered by his conservative positions on a few hot-button issues — abortion, motorboat usage in the Boundary Waters Canoe area, and government spending. Indeed, he was actually well to Durenburger's right on these matters. This caused many in the liberal wing of the Democratic Farmer–Labor Party to cross over and vote for Durenberger. Short went down to defeat along with almost the entire DFL ticket, including incumbent DFL Senator Wendell Anderson, who had maneuvered to get himself appointed to Walter Mondale's seat while serving as governor two years earlier, as well as Anderson's successor as governor, Rudy Perpich.

== Personal life ==
Short was a proud Irish Catholic. He had a wife, Marion, and seven children. He anonymously gave hundreds of thousands of dollars to the University of Notre Dame.

== Death ==
Short died of lung cancer at age 65 on November 20, 1982. His funeral was held at St. Olaf Catholic Church in downtown Minneapolis, and he was interred at Resurrection Cemetery in Mendota Heights, Minnesota.

Party political offices
Preceded by Sandy Keith	Democratic nominee for Lieutenant Governor of Minnesota; 1966	Succeeded by Rudy Perpich
Preceded by Hubert Humphrey	Democratic nominee for U.S. Senator from Minnesota (Class 1); 1978	Succeeded by Mark Dayton
Sporting positions
Preceded by George Selkirk	Washington Senators / Texas Rangers General Manager; 1968–1972	Succeeded by Joe Burke
Preceded by James Lemon; 1963–1968	Owner of the Washington Senators / Texas Rangers; 1968–1974	Succeeded by Brad Corbett; 1974–1980
