= List of Texas Rangers seasons =

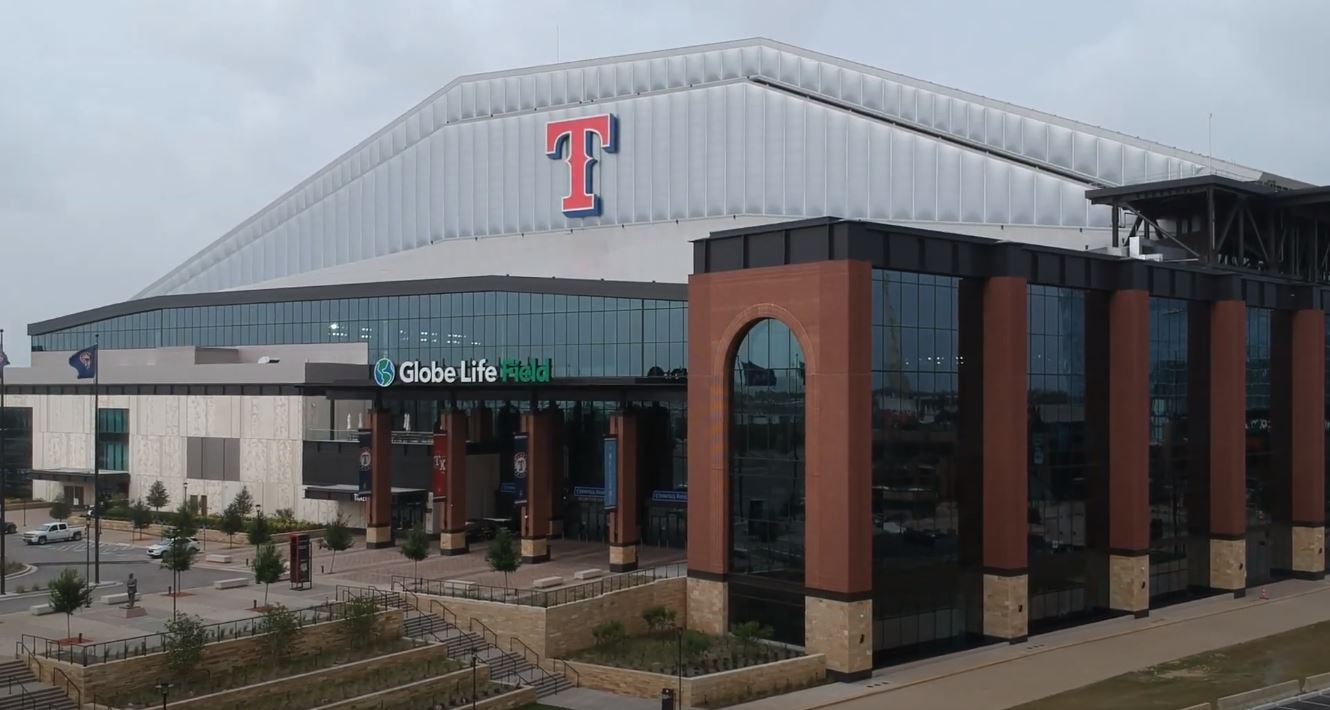
Globe Life Field, home field of the Rangers since the 2020 season.

This is a list of seasons completed by the Texas Rangers, originally known as the Washington Senators, professional baseball franchise; they have played in the American League from their inception in 1961. The Rangers have played 64 seasons as a franchise (53 in Arlington), have made the postseason nine times, the World Series three times, and won the World Series once.

Formed as the Washington Senators as the replacement team for Washington after the original Senators moved to Minnesota, the Senators played at Griffith Stadium and Robert F. Kennedy Memorial Stadium during their time in Washington, where they had just one winning season (1969) before moving to Arlington, Texas in 1972; the eight consecutive losing seasons from 1962 to 1969 is still the most in franchise history. The team continued to perform poorly, with only one season of over ninety wins and not a single postseason appearance until after the 1994 strike. After the George W. Bush/Edward W. Rose Partnership bought the team in 1989, the Rangers earned three postseason appearances in four years (1996 to 1999). The Rangers again declined to mediocrity under owner Tom Hicks after he bought the team in 1998. A series of questionable deals plagued the team until Hicks put the team into bankruptcy in 2010, at which time an ownership group led by Nolan Ryan and Chuck Greenberg bought the team and the Rangers began the best period of success in franchise history. In total, Texas has reached the postseason nine times, winning seven division titles along with three American League pennants to reach the World Series thrice (in 2010, 2011 & 2023), winning in 2023 for their first championship in franchise history.

== Season-by-season records ==
World Series champions †	AL champions *	Division champions (1969–present) ^	Wild card berth (1995–present) ¤

Season	Level	League	Division	Finish	Won	Lost	Win %	GB	Playoffs	Awards
Washington Senators
1961	MLB	AL		9th	61	100	.380	47 1/2		
1962	MLB	AL		10th	60	101	.375	35 1/2		
1963	MLB	AL		10th	56	106	.345	48 1/2		
1964	MLB	AL		9th	62	100	.382	37		
1965	MLB	AL		8th	70	92	.432	32		
1966	MLB	AL		8th	71	88	.438	25 1/2		
1967	MLB	AL		6th	76	85	.476	15 1/2		
1968	MLB	AL		10th	65	96	.399	37 1/2		
1969	MLB	AL	East	4th	86	76	.530	23		
1970	MLB	AL	East	6th	70	92	.432	38		
1971	MLB	AL	East	5th	63	96	.408	38 1/2		
Texas Rangers
1972	MLB	AL	West	6th	54	100	.350	38 1/2		
1973	MLB	AL	West	6th	57	105	.351	37		
1974	MLB	AL	West	2nd	84	76	.525	5		Jeff Burroughs (MVP); Mike Hargrove (ROY)
1975	MLB	AL	West	3rd	79	83	.487	19		
1976	MLB	AL	West	5th	76	86	.469	14		
1977	MLB	AL	West	2nd	94	68	.580	8		
1978	MLB	AL	West	3rd	87	75	.537	5		
1979	MLB	AL	West	3rd	83	79	.512	5		
1980	MLB	AL	West	4th	76	85	.468	20 1/2		
1981	MLB	AL	West	2nd	33	22	.600	1 1/2		
1981	MLB	AL	West	3rd	24	26	.480	4 1/2		
1982	MLB	AL	West	6th	64	98	.395	29		
1983	MLB	AL	West	3rd	77	85	.475	22		
1984	MLB	AL	West	7th	69	92	.428	14 1/2		
1985	MLB	AL	West	7th	62	99	.385	28 1/2		
1986	MLB	AL	West	2nd	87	75	.537	5		
1987	MLB	AL	West	7th	75	87	.462	10		
1988	MLB	AL	West	6th	70	91	.435	33 1/2		
1989	MLB	AL	West	4th	83	79	.512	16		
1990	MLB	AL	West	3rd	83	79	.512	20		
1991	MLB	AL	West	3rd	85	77	.524	10		
1992	MLB	AL	West	4th	77	85	.475	19		
1993	MLB	AL	West	2nd	86	76	.530	8		
1994	MLB	AL	West	1st	52	62	.456	—	Postseason cancelled	
1995	MLB	AL	West	3rd	74	70	.513	4 1/2		
1996	MLB	AL	West ^	1st	90	72	.555	—	Lost ALDS (Yankees) 3–1	Juan González (MVP); Johnny Oates (MOY)
1997	MLB	AL	West	3rd	77	85	.475	13		
1998	MLB	AL	West ^	1st	88	74	.543	—	Lost ALDS (Yankees) 3–0	Juan González (MVP)
1999	MLB	AL	West ^	1st	95	67	.586	—	Lost ALDS (Yankees) 3–0	Iván Rodríguez (MVP)
2000	MLB	AL	West	4th	71	91	.438	20 1/2		
2001	MLB	AL	West	4th	73	89	.450	43		
2002	MLB	AL	West	4th	72	90	.444	31		
2003	MLB	AL	West	4th	71	91	.438	25		Alex Rodriguez (MVP)
2004	MLB	AL	West	3rd	89	73	.549	3		Buck Showalter (MOY)
2005	MLB	AL	West	3rd	79	83	.487	16		
2006	MLB	AL	West	3rd	80	82	.493	13		
2007	MLB	AL	West	4th	75	87	.462	18		
2008	MLB	AL	West	2nd	79	83	.487	21		
2009	MLB	AL	West	2nd	87	75	.537	10		
2010	MLB	AL *	West ^	1st	90	72	.556	—	Won ALDS (Rays) 3–2; Won ALCS (Yankees) 4–2; Lost World Series (Giants) 4–1 *	Josh Hamilton (MVP); Neftalí Feliz (ROY)
2011	MLB	AL *	West ^	1st	96	66	.593	—	Won ALDS (Rays) 3–1; Won ALCS (Tigers) 4–2; Lost World Series (Cardinals) 4–3 *	
2012	MLB	AL	West	2nd ¤	93	69	.574	1	Lost ALWC (Orioles)	
2013	MLB	AL	West	2nd ^{[A]}	91	72	.558	5 1/2		
2014	MLB	AL	West	5th	67	95	.414	31		
2015	MLB	AL	West ^	1st	88	74	.543	—	Lost ALDS (Blue Jays) 3–2	Jeff Banister (MOY); Prince Fielder (CBPOY)
2016	MLB	AL	West ^	1st	95	67	.586	—	Lost ALDS (Blue Jays) 3–0	
2017	MLB	AL	West	4th	78	84	.481	23		
2018	MLB	AL	West	5th	67	95	.414	36		
2019	MLB	AL	West	3rd	78	84	.481	29		
2020	MLB	AL	West	5th	22	38	.367	14		
2021	MLB	AL	West	5th	60	102	.370	35		
2022	MLB	AL	West	4th	68	94	.420	38		
2023	MLB †	AL *	West	2nd ¤	90	72	.556	—^{[B]}	Won ALWC (Rays) 2–0; Won ALDS (Orioles) 3–0; Won ALCS (Astros) 4–3; Won World Series (Diamondbacks) 4–1 †	Corey Seager (WSMVP)
2024	MLB	AL	West	3rd	78	84	.481	10 1/2		
2025	MLB	AL	West	3rd	81	81	.500	9		Jacob deGrom (CBPOY)
2026	MLB	AL	West	2nd	80	82	.494	1		
Totals					Wins	Losses	Win%			
Totals					740	1,032	.418	Washington Senators regular season record (1961–1971)		
Totals					4,239	4,433	.489	Texas Rangers regular season record (1972–2026)		
Totals					4,979	5,465	.477	All-time regular season record (1961–2026)		
Totals					34	35	.493	All-time postseason record		
Totals					5,013	5,500	.477	All-time regular and postseason record		

^{A} The Rangers finished tied with the Tampa Bay Rays for the second wild card spot. Tampa Bay defeated Texas 5–2, in a one-game playoff to clinch the wild card spot.

^{B} The Rangers finished the season with an identical 90–72 record with Houston atop the American League West. Due to the Astros winning the season series 9 games to 4, the Astros were awarded the American League West title and the Rangers a wild card spot.

== Record by decade ==
The following table describes the Rangers' MLB win–loss record by decade.

Decade	Wins	Losses	Pct
1960s	607	844	.418
1970s	747	860	.465
1980s	720	839	.462
1990s	807	747	.519
2000s	776	844	.479
2010s	843	778	.520
2020s	479	553	.464
All-time	4,979	5,465	.477

== Postseason appearances ==
Year	Wild Card Game/Series		LDS		LCS		World Series	
1996	None (Won AL West)		New York Yankees	L (1–3)				
1998	None (Won AL West)		New York Yankees	L (0–3)				
1999	None (Won AL West)		New York Yankees	L (0–3)				
2010	None (Won AL West)		Tampa Bay Rays	W (3–2)	New York Yankees	W (4–2)	San Francisco Giants	L (1–4)
2011	None (Won AL West)		Tampa Bay Rays	W (3–1)	Detroit Tigers	W (4–2)	St. Louis Cardinals	L (3–4)
2012	Baltimore Orioles L							
2015	Bye (Won AL West)		Toronto Blue Jays	L (2–3)				
2016	Bye (Won AL West)		Toronto Blue Jays	L (0–3)				
2023	Tampa Bay Rays	W (2–0)	Baltimore Orioles	W (3–0)	Houston Astros	W (4–3)	Arizona Diamondbacks	W (4–1)

== Postseason record by year ==
The Rangers have made the postseason nine times in their history, with their first being in 1996 and the most recent being in 2023.

Year	Finish	Round	Opponent	Result		
1996	AL West Champions	ALDS	New York Yankees	Lost	1	3
1998	AL West Champions	ALDS	New York Yankees	Lost	0	3
1999	AL West Champions	ALDS	New York Yankees	Lost	0	3
2010	American League Champions	ALDS	Tampa Bay Rays	Won	3	2
2010	American League Champions	ALCS	New York Yankees	Won	4	2
2010	American League Champions	World Series	San Francisco Giants	Lost	1	4
2011	American League Champions	ALDS	Tampa Bay Rays	Won	3	1
2011	American League Champions	ALCS	Detroit Tigers	Won	4	2
2011	American League Champions	World Series	St. Louis Cardinals	Lost	3	4
2012	AL Wild Card	Wild Card Game	Baltimore Orioles	Lost	0	1
2015	AL West Champions	ALDS	Toronto Blue Jays	Lost	2	3
2016	AL West Champions	ALDS	Toronto Blue Jays	Lost	0	3
2023	World Series Champions	Wild Card Series	Tampa Bay Rays	Won	2	0
2023	World Series Champions	ALDS	Baltimore Orioles	Won	3	0
2023	World Series Champions	ALCS	Houston Astros	Won	4	3
2023	World Series Champions	World Series	Arizona Diamondbacks	Won	4	1
9	Totals			8–8	34	35
