= Rick Henninger =

American baseball player (born 1948)

- Pitcher
- Born: January 11, 1948 (age 78); Hastings, Nebraska, U.S.
- Batted: Right Threw: Right

MLB debut
- September 3, 1973, for the Texas Rangers

Last MLB appearance
- September 24, 1973, for the Texas Rangers

MLB statistics
- Win–loss record: 1-0
- Earned run average: 2.74
- Strikeouts: 6
- Stats at Baseball Reference

Teams
- Texas Rangers (1973)

Richard Lee Henninger (born January 11, 1948) is an American former professional baseball pitcher. He played for the Texas Rangers of Major League Baseball (MLB) in 1973.

A native of Hastings, Nebraska, Henninger attended Hastings High School and graduated in 1966. He went to the University of Missouri and had a standout sophomore year. Henninger was selected with the 16th overall pick in the 1968 June Secondary Phase Draft by the Washington Senators. He joined the Texas Rangers organization and made his MLB debut on September 3, 1973, against the Chicago White Sox. Henninger pitched six games and finished with a 2.74 earned run average with one win. After his baseball career, he moved to Denver and worked in the oil industry.

Henninger was the first draft pick from the Missouri Tigers baseball program to reach the Major Leagues, despite being the 22nd player drafted from the university. He would be the only player from the school to reach the MLB until pitcher Jeff Cornell did so in 1984 with the San Francisco Giants.
