= Don Castle (baseball) =

American baseball player (born 1950)

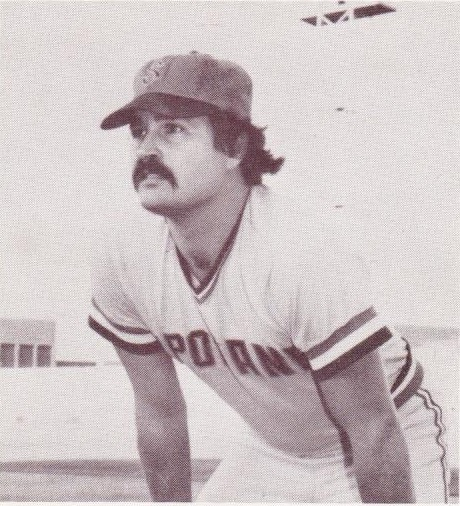
- Designated hitter
- Born: February 1, 1950 (age 76); Coldwater, Mississippi, U.S.
- Batted: Left Threw: Left

MLB debut
- September 11, 1973, for the Texas Rangers

Last MLB appearance
- September 29, 1973, for the Texas Rangers

MLB statistics
- Batting average: .308
- Home runs: 0
- Runs batted in: 2
- Stats at Baseball Reference

Teams
- Texas Rangers (1973)

Donald Hardy Castle (born February 1, 1950) is an American former professional baseball player. He played in four games in Major League Baseball for the Texas Rangers in 1973, three as a designated hitter and one as a pinch hitter.

Castle was drafted as a first baseman in the first round in 1968 by the Washington Senators, who became the Rangers in 1972. In addition to his brief major league career, Castle played for eleven years in minor league baseball, finishing his career with the West Haven Yankees in 1978.
