= Frank Lucchesi =

American baseball player and manager (1927–2019)

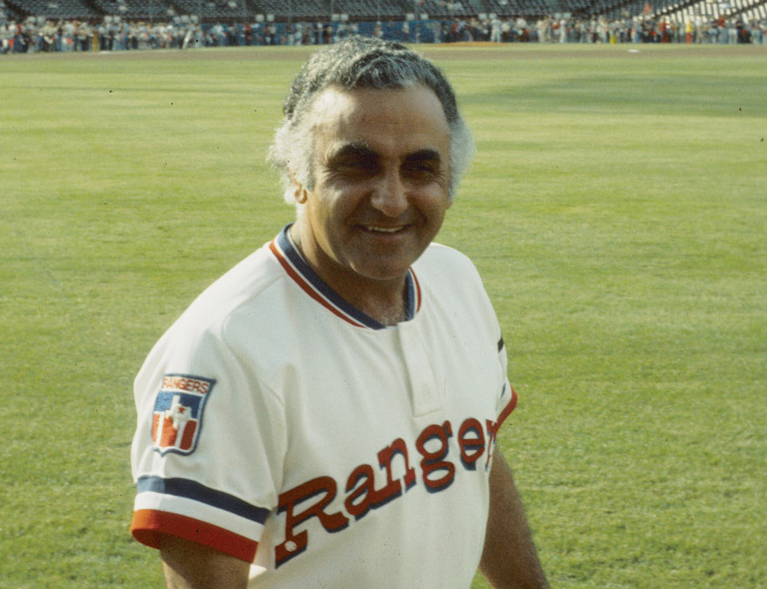
- Lucchesi as manager of the Rangers, May 1977
- Manager
- Born: April 24, 1926; San Francisco, California, U.S.
- Died: June 8, 2019 (aged 93); Colleyville, Texas, U.S.
- Batted: Right Threw: Right

MLB statistics
- Games managed: 715
- Managerial record: 316–399
- Winning percentage: .442
- Stats at Baseball Reference
- Managerial record at Baseball Reference

Teams
- As manager: Philadelphia Phillies (1970–1972); Texas Rangers (1975–1977); Chicago Cubs (1987); As coach: Texas Rangers (1973–1975, 1979–1980)

Frank Joseph Lucchesi (/luːˈkeɪsiː/ loo-KAY-see; April 24, 1926 – June 8, 2019) was an American professional baseball player, manager, and coach. He was the manager of three Major League Baseball (MLB) teams: the Philadelphia Phillies (1970–1972); Texas Rangers (1975–1977); and Chicago Cubs (1987, on an interim basis). Overall, Lucchesi posted a career win–loss record of 316–399 (.442).

== Minor league career ==
A native of San Francisco, Lucchesi had a long career as an outfielder and manager in minor league baseball. As a player (1945–1957), he toiled largely in the mid- and lower minors, in the Class B Western International League and Class C California League. He batted .276 in 1,149 games with 56 home runs. Lucchesi batted and threw right-handed, stood 5 feet 7 inches (1.70 m) tall and weighed 170 pounds (77 kg).

His managerial career began in 1951 in the Class D Far West League as a player-manager. After a brief, early-1950s stint in the St. Louis Browns' organization, Lucchesi joined the Phillies' farm system in 1956. He logged 14 seasons as a manager there, including Triple-A assignments with the Arkansas Travelers, San Diego Padres and Eugene Emeralds, winning two championships; Eugene's 1969 Pacific Coast League regular-season division title earned Lucchesi promotion to the manager's job in Philadelphia the following season. In the 1970s and 1980s, Lucchesi also managed in the Cleveland Indians and Cincinnati Reds organizations.

== Manager of Phillies, Rangers, and Cubs ==
Lucchesi took over the Phillies at the beginning of the 1970 season as the team was rebuilding with young players. Although his initial squad showed a ten-game improvement from 1969's club, the 1971 Phillies fell into the basement of the National League East Division, and when the Phils started only 26–50 in 1972, Lucchesi was fired on July 9 by the club's new general manager, Paul Owens, who took over as manager himself.

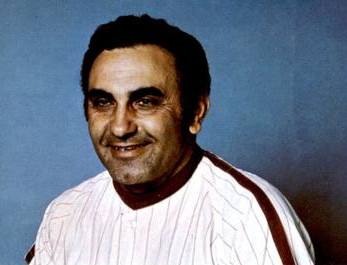
Lucchesi during his tenure with the Philadelphia Phillies, circa 1972

After returning to Triple-A to manage Cleveland's Oklahoma City 89ers affiliate in 1973, Lucchesi was appointed third-base coach of the Texas Rangers of the American League (AL) for 1974. The following season, on July 21, 1975, Lucchesi succeeded the fired Billy Martin as manager of the 1975 Rangers, who were a disappointing 44–51 in Martin's second season at the helm. Lucchesi led them to a 35–32 mark for the remainder of the year, and was rehired for 1976, when the Rangers continued to struggle at 76–86, tied for fourth in the AL West. Lucchesi was invited to return as manager for 1977, but a violent incident in spring training with second baseman Lenny Randle marred the season.

Lucchesi was auditioning rookie Bump Wills to take over Randle's second base job. When Randle complained publicly about being benched, Lucchesi was quoted as responding: "I'm sick and tired of punks making $80,000 a year moaning and groaning about their situation." A few days later, before an exhibition game against the Minnesota Twins in Orlando, Randle and Lucchesi became embroiled in an argument. Randle struck his manager, who was still clad in street clothes, knocking Lucchesi to the ground and causing his hospitalization for a concussion and broken jaw. Randle was suspended without pay for 30 days, fined an additional $10,000, then traded to the New York Mets.

Meanwhile, Lucchesi recovered from his injuries and returned to the bench, but on June 21, with the 1977 Rangers stalled at 31–31, he was fired. Randle was found guilty of assault, and Lucchesi later sued him for $200,000, blaming Randle for the loss of his job. The case was settled, and in 1979–80 Lucchesi returned to the Rangers as third-base coach, serving under manager Pat Corrales, whom he had managed 15 years earlier in the Phillies' farm system.

In 1987, Lucchesi was named caretaker pilot of the Chicago Cubs on September 8 upon the firing of Gene Michael. He had been serving the team as an "eye in the sky" scout from the press box. The Cubs went 8–17 over the season's final month, then hired both a new general manager, Jim Frey, and a new manager, Don Zimmer, for 1988. Lucchesi, then 61, returned to the minor leagues for two final seasons, managing the Nashville Sounds, the Reds' top affiliate in the Triple-A American Association.

== Personal life ==
On June 8, 2019, Lucchesi died at his home in Colleyville, Texas, at the age of 93.

Preceded by Chuck Hiller; Pat Corrales	Texas Rangers third base coach 1974–1975; 1979–1980	Succeeded by Jackie Moore; Darrell Johnson
