= Jeff Terpko =

American baseball player (born 1950)

- Pitcher
- Born: October 16, 1950 (age 75); Sayre, Pennsylvania, U.S.
- Batted: Right Threw: Right

MLB debut
- September 21, 1974, for the Texas Rangers

Last MLB appearance
- June 2, 1977, for the Montreal Expos

MLB statistics
- Win–loss record: 3–4
- Earned run average: 3.14
- Strikeouts: 41
- Stats at Baseball Reference

Teams
- Texas Rangers (1974, 1976); Montreal Expos (1977)

Jeffrey Michael Terpko (born October 16, 1950) is a former Major League Baseball pitcher. Terpko played for the Texas Rangers in 1974 and 1976 and the Montreal Expos in 1977.

== Pro career ==
Jeff Terpko was drafted by the Washington Senators in the fifth round of the 1968 MLB draft, one pick ahead of Wayne Garland. Another notable players drafted in that round include Burt Hooton and Tom Paciorek. Washington selected Terpko out of Sayre High School in Sayre, Pennsylvania.

Washington assigned Terpko to Geneva of the New York-Penn League. A 17 year old rookie baseball pitcher, Terpko went 6–5 with a 3.81 E.R.A. Though the stats weren't overly impressive, Washington skipped Terpko ahead and promoted him to their Triple-A team, the Buffalo Bisons of the International League. In a league of top level prospects and former major league players hoping to get back to the show, Terpko went 7–7 with a 5:11 E.R.A. Sensing Terpko needed more seasoning, he was demoted to Pittsfield, the Senators Double A team in the Eastern League. Terpko continued to struggle, leading Pittsfield in loses with 10.

Terpko continued to play in the minors as the Washington Senators relocated to Texas and become the Rangers. In 1974, he finally made his MLB debut for Texas. He appeared in relief in the Rangers 4–1 loss to the Kansas City Royals in the first game of a double header. Terpko was fated to spend all of 1975 in the minors before returning to Texas in 1976. He appeared in 32 games that year for Texas, earning three wins to go along with three losses.

Terpko was released by Texas after the season, and signed with the Montreal Expos. Terpko spent the bulk of the season with Montreal's Triple-A squad, the Denver Bears before being recalled. He appeared in his final major league game on June 2, 1977. He lasted less than a full inning, walking three batters in a 7–4 loss to the New York Mets.

Terpko was released at the end of the season, and signed with the Baltimore Orioles. He spent the entire season with the Orioles Triple-A farm club, the Rochester Red Wings. Terpko won three games and lost three playing for a club that went through three managers, Frank Robinson, Ken Boyer and AL Widmar. It would also be Terpko's final season as a player, as he drew his release at the end of the season.

== The Curt Flood Trade ==
Jeff Terpko was part of what would become one of the most infamous transactions in baseball history. The Washington Senators had worked out a deal to trade Terpko, Greg Goosen and Gene Martin were all set to go to the Philadelphia Phillies in exchange for Curt Flood. The Phillies had acquired Flood from the Cardinals, but he refused to report. The Phillies tried to trade the rights to Flood to Washington, but that trade was declared void when Flood opted to sue over the reserve clause.
