= John Poloni =

American baseball player (born 1954)

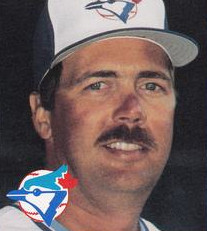
- Poloni in 1988
- Pitcher
- Born: February 28, 1954 (age 72); Dearborn, Michigan, U.S.
- Batted: Left Threw: Left

MLB debut
- September 16, 1977, for the Texas Rangers

Last MLB appearance
- October 2, 1977, for the Texas Rangers

MLB statistics
- Win–loss record: 1–0
- Earned run average: 6.43
- Strikeouts: 5
- Stats at Baseball Reference

Teams
- Texas Rangers (1977)

John Paul Poloni (born February 28, 1954) is an American left-handed former Major League Baseball pitcher who appeared in two games for the Texas Rangers in 1977.

== Career ==
Poloni was originally drafted out of Lutheran West High School in Detroit, Michigan by the Pittsburgh Pirates in the third round of the 1972 amateur draft; however he opted not to sign. He was then drafted by the Rangers in the sixth round of the 1975 amateur draft out of Arizona State University, signing.

Poloni spent three seasons in the minor leagues until making his big league debut on September 16, 1977. Pitching against the Minnesota Twins in his first match, Poloni pitched two innings, allowing one earned run while allowing two hits and striking out two batters. The first batter he faced was Butch Wynegar.

He started his second game on October 2 against the Oakland Athletics. He pitched five innings, allowing six hits and four earned runs, while striking out three batters and walking one, earning the win. He was relieved by Roger Moret, who earned the save.

In total, Poloni went 1-0 with a 6.43 ERA in seven innings. He allowed eight hits and one walk while striking out five batters.

He then pitched in the minor leagues in 1978, 1980, 1983 and from 1985 to 1986. In eight seasons on the farm, he went 45-44 with a 4.24 ERA in 120 games (95 starts).
