= Keith Smith (outfielder) =

American baseball player (born 1953)

- Outfielder
- Born: May 3, 1953 (age 73); Palmetto, Florida, U.S.
- Batted: Right Threw: Right

MLB debut
- August 2, 1977, for the Texas Rangers

Last MLB appearance
- October 5, 1980, for the St. Louis Cardinals

MLB statistics
- Batting average: .207
- Home runs: 2
- Runs batted in: 8
- Stats at Baseball Reference

Teams
- Texas Rangers (1977); St. Louis Cardinals (1979–1980)

Keith Lavaughn Smith (born May 3, 1953) is an American former professional baseball outfielder. He played in Major League Baseball (MLB) for the Texas Rangers in 1977 and the St. Louis Cardinals from 1979 to 1980. His minor league career spanned from 1972 to 1981. His brother, Bobby Smith, was also a professional baseball player. All MLB records list him as Keith Lavarne Smith.

Smith was raised in Palmetto, Florida. His childhood home was demolished in order to make way for U.S. Route 19. He initially attended Manatee High School but, when the state attempted to force racial integration via busing, he transferred to Palmetto High School.

Smith bypassed several college football scholarship offers in order to play college baseball at Manatee Junior College. Smith was drafted twice before signing with a major league club. He was initially taken in the seventh round of the 1972 January Draft by the Cardinals out of Manatee, but did not sign. After being drafted in the fourth round of the 1972 June Secondary Draft by the Rangers, he did sign.

On August 2, 1977, Smith made his major league debut at the age of 24. He had five plate appearances in his first game, going hitless in three at-bats with a walk and run scored off of Chicago White Sox pitcher Lerrin LaGrow. Less than two weeks later, on August 12, he hit the first home run of his major league career, also off of LaGrow. Smith played in 23 games in his inaugural big league season, hitting .239 with two home runs and six RBI.

He did not play in the majors in 1978, spending the entire season with the Triple-A Tucson Toros.

On February 12, 1979, he was traded to the Cardinals for pitcher Tommy Toms. He spent most of the season in the minors, hitting .350 in 119 games for the Springfield Cardinals. In a cup of coffee with the big league club that year, he hit .231 in 13 at-bats.Smith appeared in 24 games for the Cardinals in 1980, hitting .129 in 31 at-bats.

He played his final big league game on October 5. Overall, Smith hit .207 with two home runs and 8 RBI in 53 games during his three-year career. Smith spent spring training with the Chicago White Sox in 1982. At the end of spring, the organization offered him a coaching job. Smith rejected the offer, believing his playing days were not yet done. He instead took a job as a bus driver in Florida to occupy his time while he tried to work his way back onto a baseball roster. He would never play in another professional game.
