= Jackie Moore (baseball) =

American baseball player and manager (born 1939)

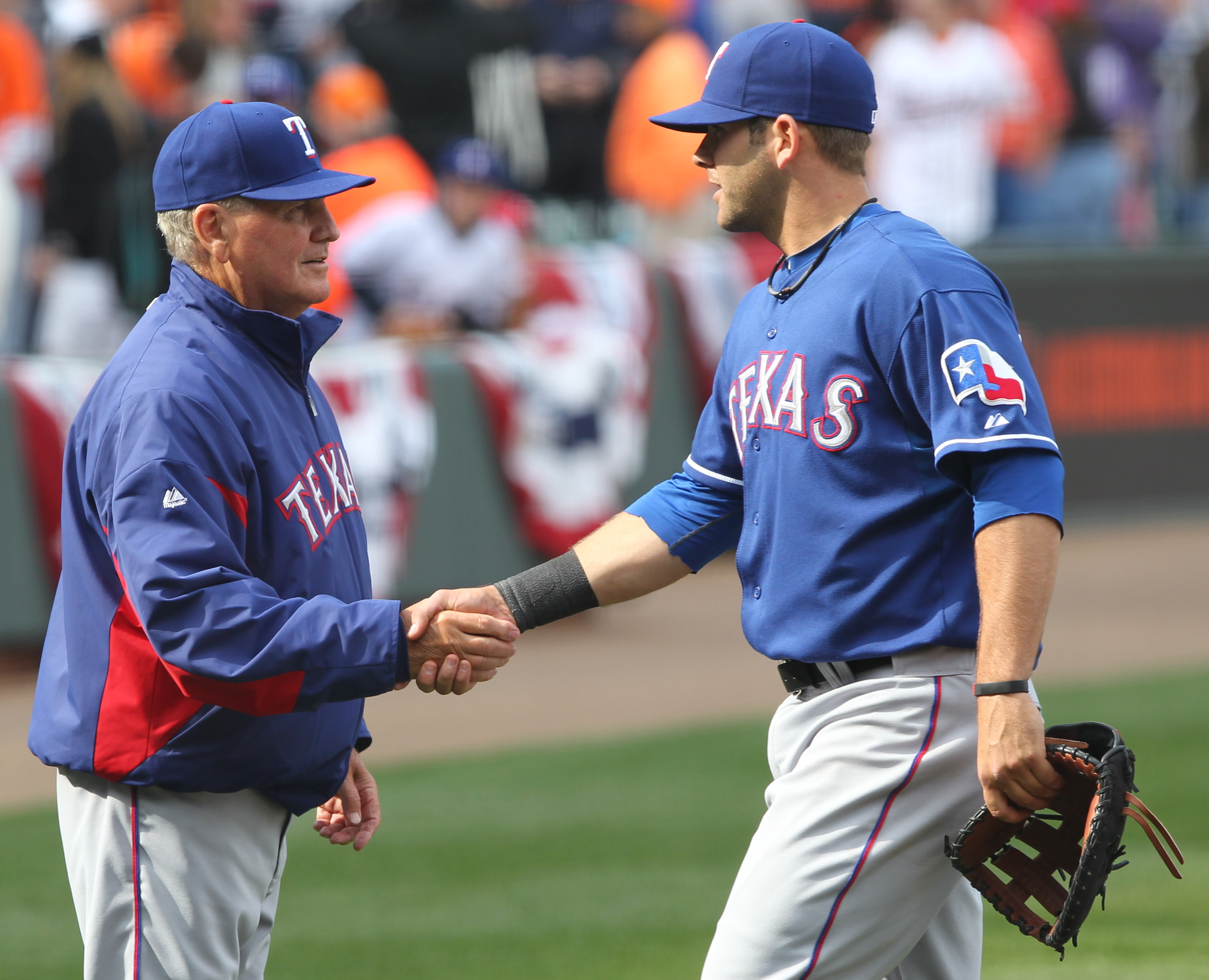
- Moore (left) with the Texas Rangers in 2011
- Catcher / Manager
- Born: February 19, 1939 (age 87); Jay, Florida, U.S.
- Batted: Right Threw: Right

MLB debut
- April 18, 1965, for the Detroit Tigers

Last MLB appearance
- September 20, 1965, for the Detroit Tigers

MLB statistics
- Batting average: .094
- Hits: 5
- Runs batted in: 2
- Managerial record: 163–190
- Winning %: .462
- Stats at Baseball Reference
- Managerial record at Baseball Reference

Teams
- As player: Detroit Tigers (1965); As manager: Oakland Athletics (1984–1986); As coach: Milwaukee Brewers (1970–1972); Texas Rangers (1973–1974, 1975–1976); Toronto Blue Jays (1977–1979); Texas Rangers (1980); Oakland Athletics (1981–1984); Montreal Expos (1987–1989); Cincinnati Reds (1990–1992); Texas Rangers (1993–1994); Colorado Rockies (1996–1998); Houston Astros (2008); Texas Rangers (2009–2013)

Career highlights and awards
- World Series champion (1990)

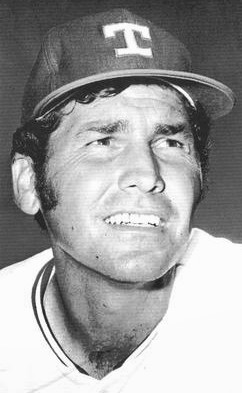
Moore in 1974

Jackie Spencer Moore (born February 19, 1939) is an American former professional baseball catcher, coach and manager. He spent all or parts of 12 years over five separate terms as a Texas Rangers coach, and 32 years in all as a coach for eight different Major League Baseball (MLB) teams. Moore managed the Oakland Athletics (1984–86), and played part of one season with the Detroit Tigers as a third-string catcher in 1965.

== Playing career ==
After graduating from Bellaire High School in Houston, Texas, Moore joined the Tigers as an amateur free agent in 1957 when just eighteen years old. He started his minor-league career as an outfielder, with the Montgomery Rebels in 1957, but was converted to catcher in 1958 and remained behind the plate the rest of his playing career. He hit .264, with 43 home runs and 162 runs batted in, in the eight years in the Tigers' farm system before being called up to the parent club for the 1965 season only.

He caught 12 innings of a 13-inning marathon against the California Angels in his Major League debut, and his first MLB hit was a thirteenth-inning single that moved the eventual winning run to third. But after that, he didn't get much playing time behind perennial All-Star Bill Freehan and backup catcher John Sullivan.

His MLB career consisted of just 53 at-bats with a meager .094 batting average. On October 4, 1965, the Tigers acquired starting pitcher Bill Monbouquette from the Boston Red Sox for George Smith, George Thomas and a player to be named later, which turned out to be Moore just nine days later. He spent 1967 in the BoSox organization as a catcher for the Triple-A Toronto Maple Leafs of the International League before retiring as an active player.

== Brewers, Rangers, Blue Jays and Athletics coach (1970–84) ==
Despite his brief playing stint in the Majors, Moore spent over forty years coaching in the game, most of which has been at the MLB level.

His post-playing career began in the Red Sox farm system in 1968 as the manager of the Jamestown Falcons of the short-season Class A New York–Penn League. In two seasons under Moore, Jamestown went 64–85. He then was hired as bullpen coach for the Seattle Pilots shortly after their one and only season in Major League Baseball (1969), and went with them when they moved to Milwaukee and became the Brewers starting in 1970. He was their bullpen coach through 1972, when he was released at the end of the season.

In 1973, Moore was hired by new Texas Rangers' manager Whitey Herzog as his first-base coach, beginning his first stint with the team. He was retained by Billy Martin when Martin took over as the Rangers' pilot in 1974. After one season under Martin, the Rangers shifted Moore to manager of their Double-A farm team, the Pittsfield Rangers of the Eastern League, for 1975. But on July 20, 1975, Martin was fired and replaced by third-base coach Frank Lucchesi, and Moore was called back to the Rangers to fill a vacancy on Lucchesi's staff, his second turn as one of the club's coaches.

Moore stayed with Lucchesi and the Rangers through 1976, before he joined one of the American League's 1977 expansion teams, the Toronto Blue Jays. He spent three seasons in Toronto working for skipper Roy Hartsfield, but when Hartsfield was replaced by Bobby Mattick, Moore also departed. He rejoined the Rangers in 1980, but his third stint with them lasted just one season when, at the end of year, manager Pat Corrales and his entire coaching staff were fired.

== Oakland manager (1984–86) ==
In 1981, Billy Martin, now manager of the Oakland Athletics, invited Moore to coach first base for his "Billy Ball" team. He remained with the club after Steve Boros replaced Martin in 1983, and eventually replaced Boros as manager on May 24, 1984. In his only full season at the helm, 1985, the A's went 77–85.

The 1986 Athletics' record hovered around .500 until an 8–23 skid dropped the team's record to 29–44 in mid-June, worst in the majors. Moore, who went 163–190 (.462) in his 2+ years managing the A's, was replaced on an interim basis on June 25 by Jeff Newman, and in early July by Tony La Russa, who stayed in Oakland through 1995.

== Expos, Reds, Rangers and Rockies' coach (1987–99) ==
In 1987, Moore caught on as a coach with the Montreal Expos under manager Buck Rodgers, and was Montreal's third-base coach through 1989. He celebrated his only World Series championship with Lou Piniella's Cincinnati Reds when he joined them in 1990 as their bench coach. He stayed with the Reds through Piniella's departure in 1992, after which he left for his fourth stint in Texas (1993–1994, during the managerial tenure of Kevin Kennedy), followed by three seasons as bench coach for the Colorado Rockies on the staff of Don Baylor.

== Round Rock Express (2000–07) ==
In 2000, Moore was appointed the first manager in the history of the Round Rock Express, the Double-A affiliate of the Houston Astros owned by a syndicate that included Baseball Hall of Fame pitcher Nolan Ryan. He led his team to a Texas League championship with an 83–57 record in their first season to earn the Texas League Manager of the Year Award. He followed that up with league titles in 2001 and 2002, and division titles in 2003 and 2004. Moore was named the league's Manager of the Year again in 2001 and 2004.

In 2005, the Express moved up to Triple-A in the Pacific Coast League. Moore remained their manager through 2007, winning a division crown in 2006.

In his five Texas League seasons the Express went 376–324; in the Pacific Coast League, 220–210.

== Return to the Majors as a coach (2008) ==
On September 30, 2007, he was named the Houston Astros' bench coach for the 2008 season by manager Cecil Cooper. Moore was Cooper's first professional baseball manager with Jamestown in 1968. After just one season, Moore left the Astros to begin his fifth term as a coach with the Texas Rangers, reuniting him with Ryan, then club president of the Rangers. During five seasons as the bench coach for manager Ron Washington, the Rangers won two American League pennants, qualified for the playoffs three times, and tied for the second AL wild card in 2013. After the Rangers' defeat at the hands of the Tampa Bay Rays in a one-game playoff on September 30, 2013, Moore, 74, was notified he would not return as the club's bench coach for 2014.

== Personal life ==
Moore and his wife, JoAnn, have two sons, Spencer and Johnathon. Johnathon was drafted by Texas, in the 45th round of the 2010 Major League Baseball draft as a catcher/first baseman with the Arizona Fall League AZL Rangers. Moore has four children from his first marriage: Debby, Sherry, Jackie Jr., and Wanda.

Preceded by Don Zimmer	Colorado Rockies bench coach 1996–1998	Succeeded by Bruce Kimm
Preceded by José Cruz	Houston Astros bench coach 2008	Succeeded by Ed Romero
Preceded by Art Howe	Texas Rangers bench coach 2009–2013	Succeeded by Tim Bogar
