= Lew Beasley =

American baseball player (born 1948)

- Outfielder
- Born: August 27, 1948 (age 77); Sparta, Virginia, U.S.
- Batted: Left Threw: Right

MLB debut
- May 21, 1977, for the Texas Rangers

Last MLB appearance
- October 2, 1977, for the Texas Rangers

MLB statistics
- Batting average: .219
- Home runs: 0
- Runs batted in: 3
- Stats at Baseball Reference

Teams
- Texas Rangers (1977)

Lewis Paige Beasley (born August 27, 1948) is an American former professional baseball player. He played 25 games in Major League Baseball for the Texas Rangers in 1977, primarily as an outfielder.
