= Dominican Summer League Rangers =

Dominican Summer League Rangers Blue
- Boca Chica

Minor league affiliations
- Class: Rookie
- League: Dominican Summer League
- Division: Southeast Division

Major league affiliations
- Team: Texas Rangers

Minor league titles
- League titles (2): 2013; 2014

Team data
- Name: DSL Rangers Blue
- Colors: Royal blue, red, white
- Ballpark: Texas Rangers Dominican Academy
- Owner(s)/ Operator(s): Texas Rangers
- Manager: Ruben Sosa

Dominican Summer League Rangers Red
- Boca Chica

Minor league affiliations
- Class: Rookie
- League: Dominican Summer League
- Division: East Division

Major league affiliations
- Team: Texas Rangers

Minor league titles
- League titles (0): None

Team data
- Name: DSL Rangers Red
- Colors: Royal blue, red, white
- Ballpark: Texas Rangers Dominican Academy
- Owner(s)/ Operator(s): Texas Rangers
- Manager: Esteban Cordoza

The Dominican Summer League Rangers or DSL Rangers are a Minor League Baseball team of the Dominican Summer League and Rookie affiliates of the Texas Rangers. They are located in Boca Chica, Santo Domingo, Dominican Republic. Since 2014, the team has been split into two squads, DSL Rangers Blue and DSL Rangers Red.

== History ==
The team was established in 1989 as a shared affiliate of the Texas Rangers, Chicago White Sox, and Houston Astros. For 1990 and 1991, they were an independent Rangers affiliate. For 1992, they shared an affiliation with the expansion Florida Marlins. In 1993, they shared an affiliation with the Chicago Cubs. In 1994, they shared an affiliation with the Atlanta Braves. They became an independent Rangers affiliate again in 1995 and have remained so ever since. The team has split into two squads three different times in their existence: 1997, 2008, 2009, and since 2014.

In 2019, the Rangers opened a new $12.5 million organizationally owned Dominican Academy complex in Boca Chica. The complex includes three full size fields, a 18,500 square-foot clubhouse with lockers for 100 players, a 2,500 square-foot weight room, a 10,000 square-foot batting cage, and a 30,000 square-foot dormitory which accommodates 96 players and 29 staff members. Also included is a 90-seat dining hall and standalone office building.

== Rosters ==
Dominican Summer League Rangers Blue roster
Players		Coaches/Other
Pitchers: 31 Albert Cordero; 41 Frederik Dolsi; 43 Ayverson Echenique; 18 Enmanuel Figuereo; 14 Masahiro Fukuda; 53 Luis Garcia; 47 Angel Gomez; 49 Nestor Gonzalez; 48 Yeferson Gonzalez; 51 Danny Jimenez; 22 Diego Lanzosa; 30 Emmanuel Martinez; 15 Ruben Medina; 29 Brian Morban; 52 Daniel Ramos; 12 Oscar Romero; 26 Yadiel Roquez; 24 Maykel Sanchez; 54 Aneudy Santos; 21 Ariel Yean	Catchers: 20 Klendy Leen; 37 Steven Santos; 32 Carlos Torres; 40 Abel Valdes; Infielders: 2 Emil Martinez; 1 Dave Neely; 36 David Ortiz Jr.; 9 Raul Pereira; 23 Jayln Pinder; 27 Fraimy Santa; Outfielders: 19 Rosnel Alarcon; 16 Joaquin Arias Jr.; 25 Wesly Castillo; 3 Jhostin Genao; 33 Alex Rodriguez	Manager: -- Ruben Sosa; Coaches: -- Carlisle Koestler (pitching); -- Jesus Ovalles (bench); -- Marty Pitts (hitting); 60-day injured list: -- Jose Silvestre; 7-day injured list * On Texas Rangers 40-man roster ~ Development list # Rehab assignment ∞ Reserve list ‡ Restricted list § Suspended list † Temporarily inactive list Roster updated July 17, 2025 → More rosters: MiLB • Dominican Summer League → Texas Rangers minor league players

Dominican Summer League Rangers Red roster
Players		Coaches/Other
Pitchers: 51 Jason Alvarez; 40 Keiber Armas; 33 Anthony Astudillo; 14 Daniel Beles; 45 Yunier De Jesus; 9 Jefferson Encarnacion; 15 Christopher Hernandez; 49 Alex Lamu; 35 Gilberto Lopez; 36 Jesus Lopez; -- Victor Lopez ‡; 43 Miguel Neira; 30 Eddy Peralta; 28 Bernardo Rivera; 23 Johander Rubio; 17 Noel Ulloa	Catchers: 18 Jose Marcano; 50 Neurelin Montero; 47 Francisco Perez; Infielders: 8 Santiago Almao; 12 Yeisy Celesten; 22 Jord David Diaz; 13 Seong-Jun Kim; 44 Daniel Rodriguez; 5 Jhon Simon; 11 Fabelin Volquez; Outfielders: 24 Marco Argudin; 32 Oliver Guerrero; 46 Manni Ramirez; 38 Elorky Rodriguez; 19 Ruben Tiamo; 39 Saivel Zayas	Manager: 37 Esteban Cordoza; Coaches: -- Alexis Infante (bench); -- Matt Rabe (pitching); -- Wilton Veras (hitting); 60-day injured list: 41 Jose Alvarado; 7-day injured list * On Texas Rangers 40-man roster ~ Development list # Rehab assignment ∞ Reserve list ‡ Restricted list § Suspended list † Temporarily inactive list Roster updated July 21, 2025 → More rosters: MiLB • Dominican Summer League → Texas Rangers minor league players
