= Bill Fahey =

American baseball player and coach (born 1950)

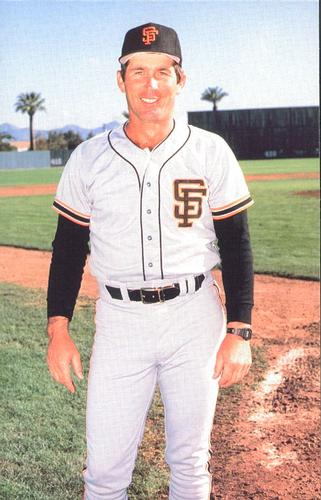
- Catcher
- Born: June 14, 1950 (age 75); Detroit, Michigan, U.S.
- Batted: Left Threw: Right

MLB debut
- September 26, 1971, for the Washington Senators

Last MLB appearance
- July 31, 1983, for the Detroit Tigers

MLB statistics
- Batting average: .241
- Home runs: 7
- Runs batted in: 83
- Stats at Baseball Reference

Teams
- Washington Senators / Texas Rangers (1971–1972, 1974–1977); San Diego Padres (1979–1980); Detroit Tigers (1981–1983)

William Roger Fahey (FAY-hee) (born June 14, 1950) is an American former catcher in professional baseball who played for the Washington Senators / Texas Rangers (1971–1972, 1974–1977), San Diego Padres (1979–1980) and Detroit Tigers (1981–1983). Fahey batted left-handed and threw right-handed. His son, Brandon, is an infielder who played with the Baltimore Orioles.

== Biography ==
Fahey played 11 seasons in the Major Leagues as a backup catcher. He shared duties with Jim Sundberg in Texas, with Gene Tenace for San Diego and Lance Parrish in Detroit. His most productive season came in 1979 with the Padres, when he hit .287 with three home runs and 19 runs batted in in 73 games. The next season, he posted career-highs in games (93), runs (18), hits (62) and RBI (22). Fahey was a .241 hitter with seven home runs and 83 RBI in 383 career games.

After his playing career ended, Fahey managed in the Detroit farm system and was a major league coach for the Tigers (1983) and San Francisco Giants (1986–91), serving as an aide to Roger Craig when Craig was the Tigers' pitching coach and then the Giants' manager. Fahey was nicknamed "Pooch". The Giants fired Fahey after the 1991 season.

== See also ==
- List of second-generation Major League Baseball players
