= Brad Corbett =

Baseball club owner (1937–2012)

- Born: Bradford Gary Corbett; October 15, 1937; The Bronx, New York, U.S.
- Died: December 24, 2012 (aged 75); Fort Worth, Texas, U.S.
- Known for: Owner of the Texas Rangers (1974–1980)

Bradford Gary Corbett (October 15, 1937 – December 24, 2012) was an American business executive. He was best known as the owner of the Texas Rangers of Major League Baseball's American League from 1974 to 1980. Corbett was born in the Bronx in 1937. After spending a semester at Siena College, he transferred to Wagner College where he graduated with a Bachelor of Arts in Economics in 1960. He was later part owner of S&B Technical Products, headquartered in Fort Worth, Texas. Originally from Long Island, New York, Corbett made a fortune in the oil business by producing and selling plastic PVC piping. He had moved to Fort Worth, Texas in 1968 and within two years had become a millionaire at the age of 32 after first securing a $300,000 Small Business Administration loan.

Corbett led an investment group that purchased the Rangers from Bob Short for $9.5 million on May 29, 1974. Serving as (in effect) his own general manager, he quickly set about spending a great deal of money on free agent players. This was during the advent of the free agency era and soon Corbett had signed such high-priced players as Bert Campaneris, Doyle Alexander, Doc Medich, Richie Zisk and Mike Jorgensen and traded for expensive talent like Bobby Bonds, Al Oliver and Jon Matlack.

Despite never making the postseason, Texas finished in second place three times under Corbett’s ownership. The ’77 club won 94 games, the most in team history until 1999. The team's winning percentage under him was .521, better than the winning percentages under most owners.

He cried openly after the Rangers lost on July 4, 1977 and told the assembled news media, "I'm selling this team because it's killing me! They are dogs on the field and they are dogs off the field." Corbett fired three managers in the six seasons that he owned the Rangers. Corbett inherited Billy Martin as his first manager when he purchased the team from Martin's personal friend, Robert Short. Martin became upset with Corbett's interference with his managing in 1975, thus prompting Martin to state, "You know as much about baseball as I do about pipe.")

In 1980, Corbett sold the team to oil producer Eddie Chiles. Reportedly, in the latter years of his ownership, Chiles would invoke Corbett's name in meetings, stating that "Brad Corbett was a terrible businessman, but he’s the best salesman the world has ever known because he sold me this sorry-assed baseball team.”

He died at his home in Fort Worth in December 2012.

== Sources ==
- Hannon, Kent (August 7, 1978). "Huffing and Puffing in Texas". Sports Illustrated.
