= Jim Sundberg =

American baseball player (born 1951)

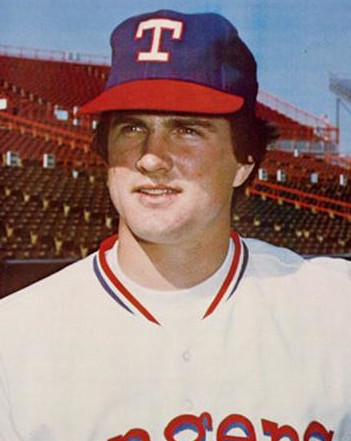
- Sundberg in 1974
- Catcher
- Born: May 18, 1951 (age 75); Galesburg, Illinois, U.S.
- Batted: Right Threw: Right

MLB debut
- April 4, 1974, for the Texas Rangers

Last MLB appearance
- September 24, 1989, for the Texas Rangers

MLB statistics
- Batting average: .248
- Home runs: 95
- Runs batted in: 624
- Stats at Baseball Reference

Teams
- Texas Rangers (1974–1983); Milwaukee Brewers (1984); Kansas City Royals (1985–1986); Chicago Cubs (1987–1988); Texas Rangers (1988–1989)

Career highlights and awards
- 3× All-Star (1974, 1978, 1984); World Series champion (1985); 6× Gold Glove Award (1976–1981); Texas Rangers Hall of Fame

James Howard Sundberg (born May 18, 1951) is an American former professional baseball player, television sports analyst, and executive. He played in Major League Baseball as a catcher from 1974 to 1989, most prominently as a member of the Texas Rangers where he established himself as one of the top defensive catchers of his era. A three-time All-Star player, Sundberg won six consecutive Gold Glove Awards during his tenure with the Rangers. Later in his career, he won a World Series championship as a member of the Kansas City Royals in 1985. He also played for the Milwaukee Brewers and the Chicago Cubs. Sundberg was inducted into the Texas Rangers Hall of Fame in 2003.

== Playing career ==
Born in Galesburg, Illinois, Sundberg graduated from the University of Iowa. While attending the university, he joined the Delta Upsilon fraternity. On January 10, 1973, he was selected by Texas Rangers in the first round of the secondary free agent draft.

On April 4, 1974, Sundberg made the rare jump from Class A-level baseball to Major League Baseball (MLB) with the Rangers at the age of 22. As a rookie, Sundberg was selected to be a reserve in the 1974 All-Star Game and finished fourth in the Rookie of the Year balloting (teammate Mike Hargrove won the award). Sundberg had 101 assists in 1975, becoming the first American League catcher to have more than 100 assists in a season since the end of the Second World War. His solid defense helped the Rangers finish above the .500 winning percentage mark for the first time since the club relocated to Texas from Washington, DC, in 1972.

In December 1983, after 10 years with the Rangers, he was traded to the Milwaukee Brewers. After playing one season with the Brewers, in which he was named to the American League All-Star team, he was traded to the Kansas City Royals.

Sundberg's veteran experience helped bolster the Royals' young pitching staff, and the team's combined earned run average improved to second-best in the American League. as the Royals narrowly prevailed over the California Angels by one game to win the 1985 American League Western Division championship. In the 1985 American League Championship Series against the Toronto Blue Jays, Sundberg, normally known for his defensive skills, became an offensive standout when he drove in four runs in the deciding game seven to help the Royals clinch the American League pennant.

The Royals went on to win the 1985 World Series. In game six of that series, Sundberg scored the dramatic ninth inning winning run by sliding into home plate, skillfully avoiding the tag of St. Louis Cardinals catcher Darrell Porter. Sundberg reached base when he laid down a bunt that resulted in a force-out at third. In 1986, Sundberg helped the Royals pitching staff lead the league in earned run average, but they fell to third place in the American League's Western Division.

Sundberg was traded to the Chicago Cubs in 1987, before signing back with Texas, where at the age of 38, he ended his career at the end of the 1989 season. He retired as the team leader in games played (1512) and hits (1180).

== Career statistics ==
In a 16-year MLB career, Sundberg played in 1,962 games, accumulating 1,493 hits in 6,021 at bats for a .248 career batting average along with 95 home runs, 624 runs batted in, and an on-base percentage of .327. His .993 career fielding average was 8 points higher than the league average over the span of his playing career. Sundberg led American League catchers six times in fielding percentage, putouts, and assists. He completed 145 double plays in 1,962 games in his career, and holds the MLB record for the best ratio of double plays to errors of any catcher in major league history behind the plate for at least 1,000 games. Sundberg still holds the American League record for games caught in one season with 155 in 1975.

Sundberg was the first catcher to win six American League Gold Gloves, although Bob Boone won five in the American League and two more in the National League. His 1976 Gold Glove was the first by any Rangers player. He caught 130 shutouts in his career, ranking him fifth all-time among catchers. Sundberg played more games as a catcher than any other player in Rangers history (1,512). At the time of his retirement, Sundberg had caught more MLB games than any man in history except his contemporary Bob Boone. He still ranks fifth today. Richard Kendall of the Society for American Baseball Research devised a study that ranked Sundberg as the third-most dominating fielding catcher in MLB history.

== Post-playing career ==
After retiring as a player, Sundberg became a color commentator on Rangers' television games from 1990 to 1995. He later served as a minor league instructor for the Rangers before joining their front office as an executive vice president of communications & public relations, executive director to the president, and director of business development from 2004 until his retirement at the end of the 2014 season. Galesburg High School named their main baseball field after Sundberg.

== Highlights ==
- Sundberg spent his 1984 All-Star season playing for the Milwaukee Brewers, when he was traded by the Rangers to Milwaukee for Ned Yost and Dan Scarpetta.
- He was a three-time All-Star (1974, 1978, 1984).
- He won a Gold Glove six times consecutively (1976–81).
- He was in the top 10 in sacrifice hits three times (1974, 1975, 1977).
- He caught Bert Blyleven's no-hitter on September 22, 1977.
