= Dave Moates =

American baseball player (born 1948)

- Outfielder
- Born: January 30, 1948 (age 77); Great Lakes, Illinois, U.S.
- Batted: Left Threw: Left

MLB debut
- September 21, 1974, for the Texas Rangers

Last MLB appearance
- October 3, 1976, for the Texas Rangers

MLB statistics
- Batting average: .260
- Home runs: 3
- Runs batted in: 27
- Stats at Baseball Reference

Teams
- Texas Rangers (1974–1976)

David Allen Moates (born January 30, 1948) is a former Major League Baseball outfielder. He played all or part of three seasons in the major leagues, from 1974 until 1976, for the Texas Rangers.

== Professional life ==
Dave Moates was drafted by the San Diego Padres in the 12th round of the 1968 MLB June Amateur Draft from State College of Florida, Manatee-Sarasota and the Washington Senators (which later became the Texas Rangers) in the 4th round of the 1969 MLB June Draft-Secondary Phase from Florida State University. in 1977 he joined the New York Yankees. He played four Major League seasons and six seasons in the minors, winning two AAA championships and one A championship as well as Player of the Year honors. In 1993 Dave Moates returned to the State College of Florida as an assistant baseball coach for the SCF Manatees.

== Personal information ==
Moates was born on January 30, 1948, in Great Lakes, IL. He studied at the State College of Florida, Manatee-Sarasota and the Florida State University.

== Sources ==
- Career statistics from Baseball Reference, or Baseball Reference (Minors)
