= List of Texas Rangers owners and executives =

The Texas Rangers Major League Baseball (MLB) franchise was established in 1961 as the Washington Senators, an expansion team awarded to Washington, D.C., after the old Washington Senators team of the American League moved to Minnesota and became the Twins. The new Senators remained in Washington through 1971. In 1972, the team moved to Arlington, Texas, where it became the Texas Rangers. In the franchise's history, 12 general managers (GMs) have been employed to oversee day-to-day operations.

== Majority owners ==
No.	Majority owner(s)	Dates	Ref.
1	Elwood Richard Quesada	1961–1963	
2	James Johnston & James Lemon	1963–1967	
3	James Lemon	1967–December 3, 1968	
4	Bob Short	December 3, 1968–May 29, 1974	
5	Brad Corbett	May 29, 1974–April 29, 1980	
6	Eddie Chiles	April 29, 1980–March 18, 1989	
7	George W. Bush & Edward W. Rose	March 18, 1989–November 1994	
8	Tom Schieffer & Edward W. Rose	November 1994–June 16, 1998	
9	Tom Hicks	June 16, 1998–August 11, 2010	
10	Rangers Baseball Express	2011–present	

== Presidents of Baseball Operations and General managers ==
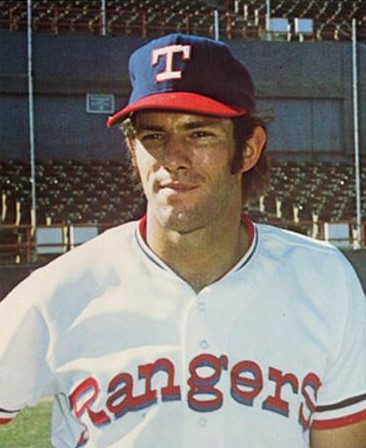
Former Senators/Rangers outfielder Tom Grieve served as the team's GM from 1984 to 1994.

No.	President of Baseball Operations	Years	Ref.
1	Jon Daniels	2013–2022	
2	Chris Young	2024–	

No.	General manager	Years	Ref.
1	Ed Doherty	1961–1962	
2	George Selkirk	1963–1968	
3	Bob Short	1969–1971	
4	Joe Burke	1972–1973	
5	Dan O'Brien Sr. (Note: Dan O'Brien Sr. and Eddie Robinson served as co-GMs from 1976 to 1979.)	1973–1979	
6	Eddie Robinson	1976–1982	
7	Joe Klein	1982–1984	
8	Tom Grieve	1984–1994	
9	Doug Melvin	1994–2001	
10	John Hart	2001–2005	
11	Jon Daniels	2005–2020	
12	Chris Young (Note: Chris Young and Ross Fenstermaker currently serve as co-GMs since November 24, 2024. Fenstermaker's official title is "Assistant General Manager" but is considered a General Manager.)	2020–present	
13	Ross Fenstermaker	2024–present	
