= History of the Texas Rangers (baseball) =

The Texas Rangers' logo since 2003

The Texas Rangers Major League Baseball (MLB) franchise was established in 1961 as the second incarnation of the Washington Senators, an expansion team awarded to Washington, D.C., after the old Washington Senators team of the American League moved to Minnesota and became the Twins. The new Senators remained in Washington through 1971 playing at Griffith Stadium in their first season and at RFK Stadium for the next 10 years. In 1972, the team moved to Arlington, Texas, where it became the Texas Rangers. The Rangers played at Arlington Stadium from 1972 to 1993. Arlington Stadium was demolished, and the new Ballpark at Arlington was built, opening in 1994. The Ballpark at Arlington was renamed Globe Life Park in Arlington in 2014.

It took the team 36 seasons to make the playoffs and they have made nine appearances since, seven following division championships in 1996, 1998, 1999, 2010, 2011, 2015, and 2016 and as a wild card team in 2012 and 2023. In 2010, the Rangers advanced past the Division Series for the first time, defeating the Tampa Bay Rays. The team then brought home their first American League pennant after beating the New York Yankees in six games. In the 2010 World Series, the franchise's first, the Rangers fell to the San Francisco Giants in five games. They repeated as American League champions the following year, then lost the 2011 World Series to the St. Louis Cardinals in seven games. The team won the 2023 World Series, effectively ending the longest drought amongst all North American pro sports franchises that are yet to win their first championship. The Rangers are in the American League West Division along with the Oakland Athletics, Seattle Mariners, Los Angeles Angels and the Houston Astros.

== Washington Senators: 1961–1971 ==
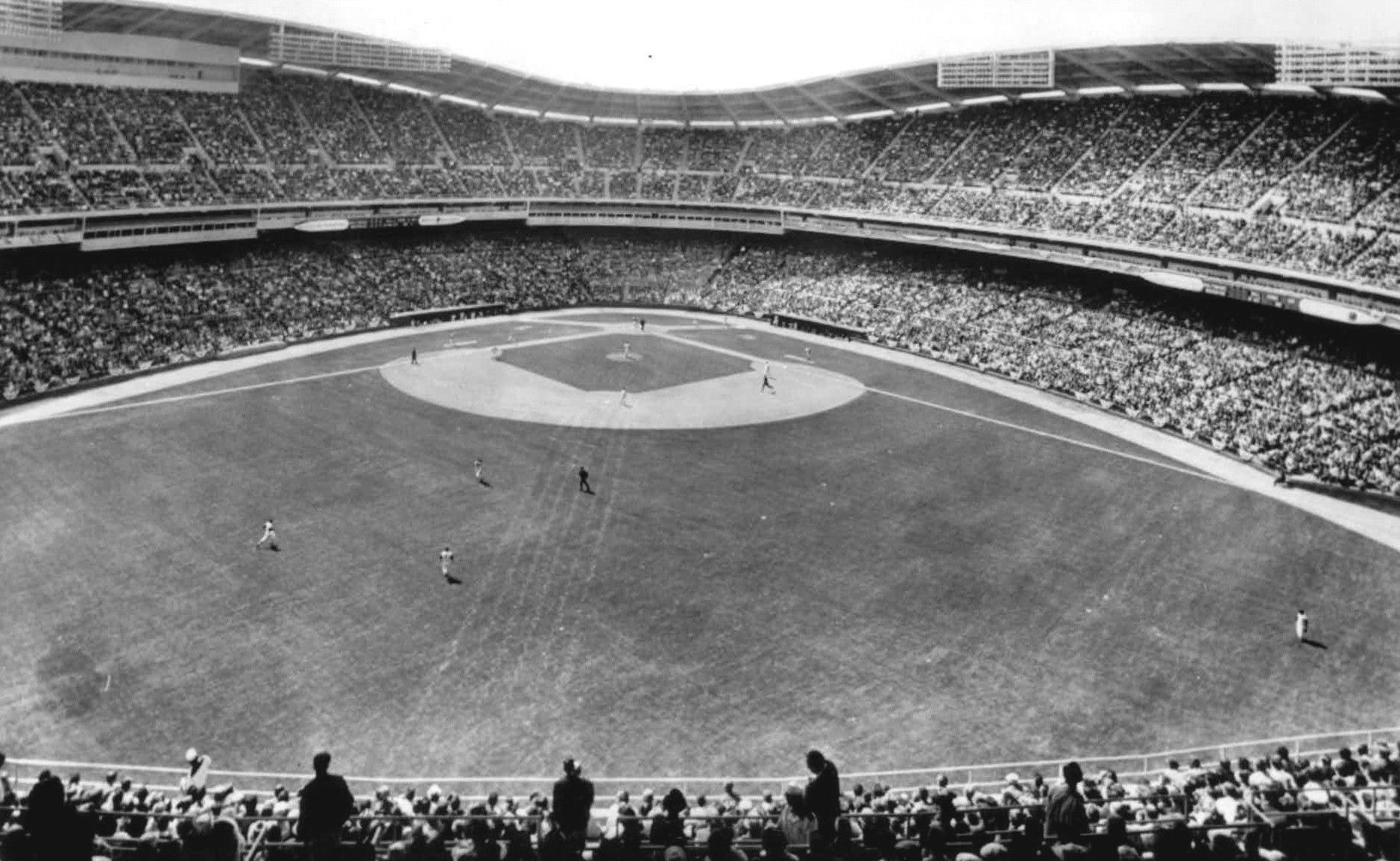
The Washington Senators played at RFK Stadium from 1962 to 1971.

When the original Washington Senators moved to Minnesota in 1960 as the Twins, Major League Baseball decided to expand a year earlier than planned to stave off threats of losing its exemption from the Sherman Antitrust Act. At the winter meetings that year, it awarded a new team to Los Angeles (the Angels) as well as a new team in the nation's capital. This new team adopted the old Senators name, but was (and still is) considered an expansion team since the Twins retained the old Senators' records and history. The Senators and Angels began to fill their rosters with American League players in an expansion draft. The team played the 1961 season at old Griffith Stadium before moving to District of Columbia Stadium (now the Robert F. Kennedy Memorial Stadium).

For most of their existence, the new Senators were the definition of futility, losing an average of 90 games a season. The team's struggles led to a twist on a joke about the old Senators—"Washington: first in war, first in peace and still last in the American League." Frank Howard, known for his towering home runs, was the team's most accomplished player, winning two home run titles.

The second iteration of the Washington Senators wore this cap logo from 1968 to 1971. It is later adopted by the Washington Nationals in 2005.

Ownership changed hands several times during the franchise's stay in Washington and was often plagued by poor decision-making and planning. Owner Pete Queseda once wondered why he needed to pay players who did not belong in the majors and later agreed to a ten-year lease at D.C. Stadium—a move that would come back to haunt the Senators. In 1963, Quesada sold his stake in the club and resigned. Washington stockbrokers James Johnston and James Lemon owned the team briefly, suffering massive financial losses. Johnston died in 1967 and Lemon sold the team a year later to hotel and trucking executive Bob Short, who outbid a group headed by Bob Hope. Short named himself general manager and hired Hall of Famer Ted Williams as manager.

The concurrent rise of the nearby Baltimore Orioles to regular championship contenders (winning their first World Series in 1966) certainly did not help the Senators draw crowds. Further expansion and re-alignment in 1969 did not do much to help the Senators either, since (unlike the National League) the AL owners ultimately voted to align their new divisions strictly based on geography. This arrangement placed both expansion teams (the Seattle Pilots and the Kansas City Royals) in the AL West, while pitting perennial also-rans Washington against the AL's five best teams in the AL East. Despite this, and despite Williams having never coached or managed at any level of baseball, the Senators recorded their only winning season as a Washington team in 1969. However, their 86–76 finish was only good enough for fourth in the extremely competitive Eastern Division. Attendance surged to over 918,000, at the time the highest in Washington baseball history.

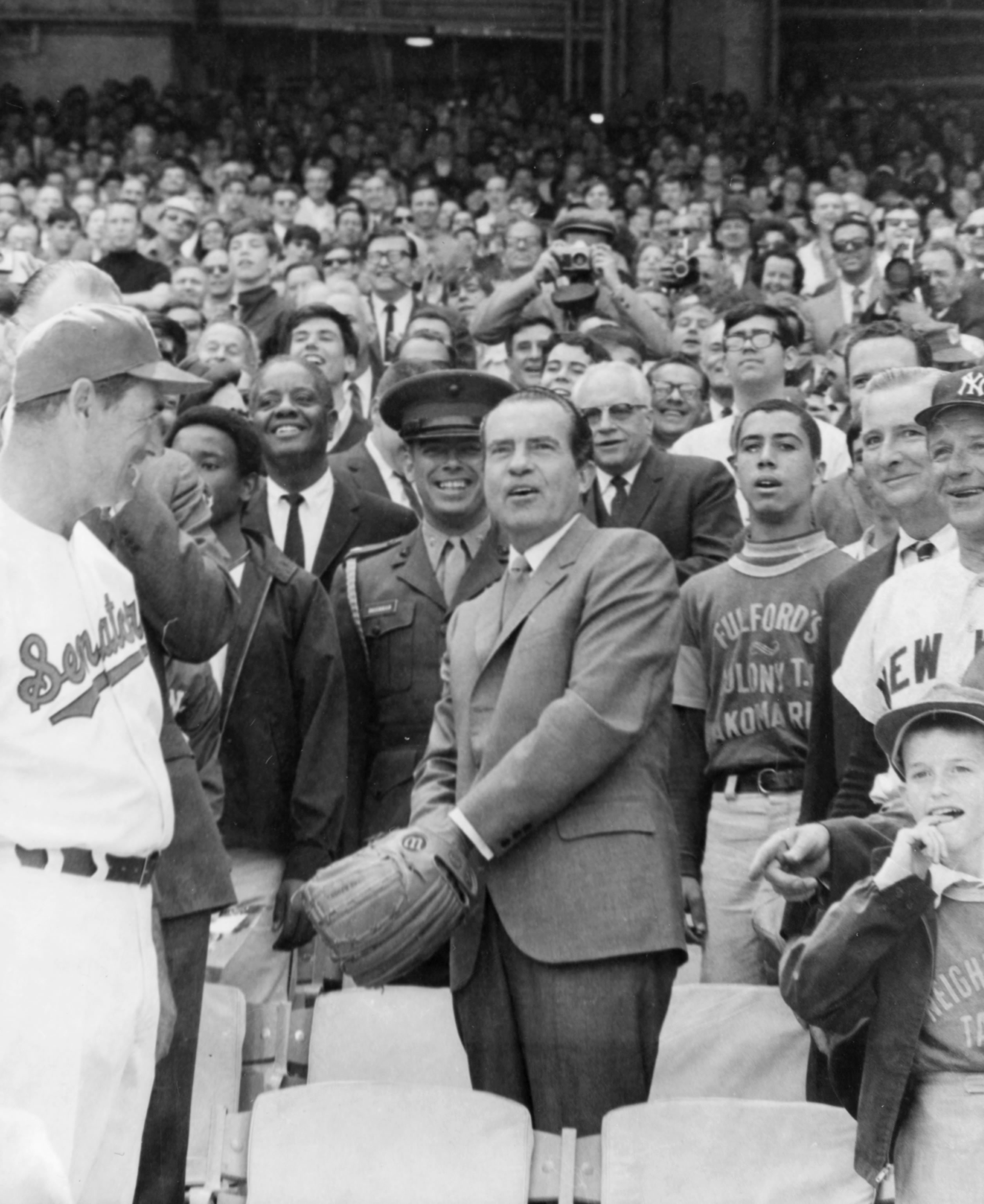
President Richard Nixon throwing out the first ball of the Senators' season in April 1969 with manager Ted Williams (left) and owner Bob Short (right, partially obscured by Yankees manager Ralph Houk)

However, this would not last. Short had borrowed most of the $9.4 million he had paid for the team. Serving as his own general manager, Short was forced to make many questionable trades to service the debt and bring in much-needed revenue. As a result, the team rapidly fell back into the American League's cellar. Moreover, like their predecessors in their final few years in the nation's capital, the new Senators had to compete for an audience with the Baltimore Orioles, 45 miles (72 km) to the northeast, who by the 1960s were perennial contenders. Fans kept their distance from the Senators while the Orioles won four American League pennants and two World Series from 1966 through 1971. As it turned out, the 1969 season would be the only time the franchise would manage so much as a .500 record in its first 12 years. As well, the Senators would never approach their 1969 gate again during their stay in Washington; it would remain the franchise record for attendance until 1974–the franchise's fourth year in Texas.

By the end of the 1970 season, Short had issued an ultimatum: unless someone was willing to buy the Senators for $12 million (in comparison, the New York Yankees were sold in 1973 for $8.8 million), he would not renew the stadium lease and move the team elsewhere. At that season's end, Short dealt his best starting pitcher and the left side of his infield to the Detroit Tigers for erstwhile 30-game-winner Denny McLain, who had spent most of the 1970 campaign suspended because of gambling allegations. The deal—alleged by onetime Senators broadcaster Shelby Whitfield to have been made in order to secure the Tigers' vote in favor of the Senators' eventual move to Texas—turned Detroit back into contenders, while McLain was a monumental bust, losing a league-worst 22 games.

Short was especially receptive to an offer from Arlington, Texas mayor Tom Vandergriff, who had been trying to get a Major League team to play in the Metroplex for over a decade. Years earlier, Charles O. Finley, the owner of the Kansas City Athletics, sought to move his team to Dallas, but the idea was rebuffed by the other AL team owners.

Arlington's hole card was Turnpike Stadium, a 10,000-seat park which had been built in 1965 to house the AA Dallas–Fort Worth Spurs of the Texas League. However, it had been built to Major League specifications. It was also located in a natural bowl, meaning only minor excavations would be necessary to expand the park to accommodate Major League crowds.

After Vandergriff offered a multimillion-dollar down payment, Short decided to make the move to Arlington. On September 21, 1971, (by a vote of 10–2, the Orioles' Jerold Hoffberger and John Allyn of the Chicago White Sox registering the dissenting votes), American League owners granted approval for the 1972 season.

Senators fans were livid. Enmity came to a head at the club's last game in Washington. Thousands of fans simply walked in without paying after the security guards left early, swelling the paid attendance of 14,460 to around 25,000, while fans unfurled a banner reading "SHORT STINKS". With the Senators leading 7–5 and two outs in the top of the ninth inning, several hundred youths stormed the field, raiding it for souvenirs. One man grabbed first base and ran off with it. With no security in sight and only three bases, umpire crew chief Jim Honochick forfeited the game to the New York Yankees.

Even after the move, the Rangers retained the rights to the Senators name, which meant the current Washington team, who relocated from Montreal in 2005, would revive another longtime name, the Nationals (which was used by several NL teams in the 19th century, as well as the first AL Senators team from 1905 to 1955). However, the Rangers allowed the Nationals to use the curly W logo that originated with the expansion Senators.

== Naming of the Rangers ==
After moving from Washington, the Senators were renamed after the Texas Rangers, the state-wide investigative law-enforcement agency which was founded by Stephen F. Austin in 1823 when Texas was part of Mexico, and whose mythology led to fictional characters such as The Lone Ranger and Walker, Texas Ranger. The franchise began as the Washington Senators in 1961, playing in Washington, D.C., before relocating to Arlington, Texas, in 1972 and becoming the Texas Rangers. This move marked a significant geographic and cultural shift for the club, beginning its long-term relationship with the Texas market.

== First years in Texas: 1972–1984 ==
During the off-season, improvements were made to Turnpike Stadium, which reopened as Arlington Stadium for the 1972 season. Meanwhile, ownership announced that the franchise would be renamed the Texas Rangers. The team played its first game on April 15, 1972, a 1–0 loss at the California Angels. The next day, the Rangers defeated the Angels 5–1 for the club's first victory. After the season Ted Williams retired as manager; he had made no secret of his displeasure with the franchise's new location. Whitey Herzog was named the new manager, but he was replaced before the end of the 1973 season by Billy Martin.

In 1974, the Rangers began to come into their own as a team. They finished the season second in the American League West with an 84–76 record, behind the eventual World Series champion Oakland Athletics. The 1974 Rangers are still the only MLB team to finish above .500 after two consecutive 100-loss seasons. Mike Hargrove was awarded A.L. Rookie of the Year, Billy Martin was named Manager of the Year, Jeff Burroughs won American League MVP, and Ferguson Jenkins was named the Comeback Player of the Year after winning 25 games, a club record to this day. However, after a 44–51 start in 1975, Martin was fired as the Rangers' manager and was replaced by Frank Lucchesi.

After excellent seasons between 1977 and 1979, the Rangers came very close to clinching a playoff spot in the first half of 1981. But when Texas lost its last game before the players' strike began, the Oakland A's won the AL West in the first half by a half-game. After 1981, the Rangers would not post another winning record for five seasons. During this stretch, the Rangers made one of their most unpopular trades ever, sending multi-Gold Glove catcher and fan favorite Jim Sundberg to the Milwaukee Brewers for future Brewers’ manager Ned Yost, who later managed the Kansas City Royals to the 2015 World Series championship.

The Rangers faced attendance problems for a few years after moving to Texas, in part due to the team's inconsistent performance and in part due to the oppressive heat and humidity that can overtake the area in the summer. Until the Florida (now Miami) Marlins arrived in 1993, Arlington Stadium was often the hottest stadium in the Majors, with temperatures frequently topping 100 °F (37.8 °C) throughout the summer months. In part because of this, the Rangers began playing most of even their weekend games between May and September at night—a tradition that continued until the opening of retractable-roofed Globe Life Field in 2020. Beginning in 1990, the Rangers usually received a waiver from ESPN to play Sunday night games and televise them in the Dallas–Fort Worth area.

== The Valentine, Ryan, and Bush years: 1985–1994 ==
Bobby Valentine, who would eventually become the Rangers' longest-serving manager at 1,186 games, took on the managerial reins of the team late in the 1985 season and became steward over an influx of talent in the late 1980s and early 1990s. A winning season in 1986 was a shock to pundits and fans alike as the Rangers remained in the race for the American League pennant for the entire season. With a team consisting of many stellar young rookies such as Rubén Sierra, Pete Incaviglia, Mitch Williams, Bobby Witt, and Edwin Correa, the Rangers finished in 2nd place with an 87–75 record, just five games behind the division champion California Angels. The season marked a dramatic 25-win improvement over the 1985 season, which resulted in a yet another last-place finish in the West. The signing of 41-year-old star pitcher Nolan Ryan prior to the 1989 season allowed Ryan to reach his 5,000th strikeout, 300th win, and sixth and seventh no-hitters with the Rangers before his long career ended in 1993. Coupled with powerful batters like Juan González, Rubén Sierra, Julio Franco, and Rafael Palmeiro and a pitching staff that also included Charlie Hough, Bobby Witt, Kevin Brown, and Kenny Rogers, fans held high expectations for the Rangers. However, the team never posted a finish higher than second place and Valentine was relieved of his duties during the 1992 season.

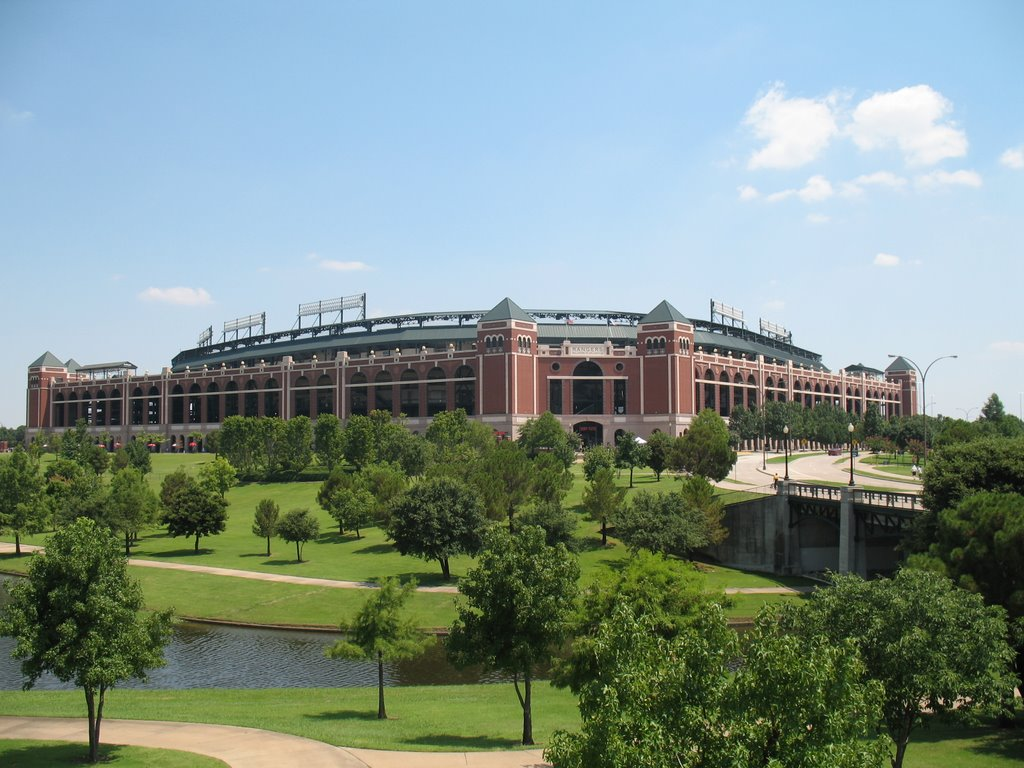
Rangers Ballpark in Arlington

In April 1989, Rangers owner and oil tycoon Eddie Chiles, sold the team to an investment group headed by George W. Bush, son of the President of the United States, George H. W. Bush. After hearing that Chiles planned to sell the team, Bush headed a group of investors that bought the team for $89 million. While his own equity in the team was a small one (about ten percent), he was named Managing General Partner of the new ownership group. He increased his investment the following year.

During his tenure, the Rangers and the City of Arlington decided to replace the aging Arlington Stadium with a new publicly funded stadium, at a cost of $193 million, financed by Arlington residents, through a sales tax increase. Ground was broken on October 30, 1991, on what would become The Ballpark in Arlington (now named Choctaw Stadium), which would open in 1994. The city, through the Arlington Sports Facilities Development Authority, also controversially authorized the seizure of 13 acres (53,000 m^{2}) of land through eminent domain for the Rangers future development. Landowners filed lawsuits over the acquisition and eventually won settlements of $22.2 million which the Rangers failed to pay.

Bush left his position with the Rangers when he was elected Governor of Texas in 1994, and was elected the 43rd President of the United States in 2000. Although Bush no longer has any ownership stake in the Rangers, he remains a fan of the team to this day and regularly attends the team's home games.

In 1993, Kevin Kennedy took over managerial duties, presiding over the team for two seasons, keeping the 1993 Rangers in the hunt for a playoff berth into mid-September. Kennedy was let go in 1994, although the team led the A.L. West (with a 52–62 record) prior to the players' strike. The strike prematurely ended what could have been the Rangers' first division championship when commissioner Bud Selig canceled the remainder of the season and the playoffs. Regardless of the unceremonious end to the 1994 season, Kenny Rogers pitched the 12th perfect game in Major League history on July 28.

== First success: 1995–2000 ==
The year 1995 saw the beginnings of promise for the Rangers. With a brand new ballpark that hosted its first All-Star Game that year, Johnny Oates was hired as the Rangers' manager. Oates and company promptly helped to bring home the 1996 AL Western Division championship, the first division championship in team history, finally reaching the playoffs in the franchise's 36th season, taking longer than any other team in North American professional sports history to accomplish the feat, 24 years after the franchise came to Texas. The series ultimately saw the Rangers lose to the burgeoning late-1990s New York Yankees, three games to one. Oates was named AL Manager of the Year and Juan González was named A.L. MVP. The team featured a powerful lineup of hitters with Iván Rodríguez, Will Clark, Mark McLemore, Dean Palmer, Rusty Greer, Juan González, and Mickey Tettleton but continued to struggle with pitching—a common stereotype of Rangers teams—despite having Rick Helling, and Aaron Sele on their roster. Oates led the team to consecutive A.L. West championships in 1998 and 1999. Neither of Oates' last two playoff teams could win a single game, losing all six in back-to-back sweeps at the hands of the Yankees, a team that won three world championships in the 1990s after defeating Rangers teams in the first round. The 1999 team would be the last playoff-bound team for over a decade, as the Rangers took a step backwards at the beginning of the new millennium. En route to a second straight last-place finish, Oates resigned his position 28 games into the 2001 season. The Rangers finished the decade going 1–9 in the postseason, without a single home win.

In 1998, venture capital billionaire Tom Hicks bought the team for $250 million. Hicks also agreed to pay the $22.2 million awarded in settlements in relation to the 1991 eminent domain litigation concerning the Ballpark in Arlington. While the team found limited success during the 1990s, earlier decades were marked by struggles common to expansion franchises, including frequent last-place finishes and managerial changes. Understanding these earlier years provides context for the eventual success of the 1990s Rangers.

== The lean years: 2001–2004 ==
=== The A-Rod era: 2001–2003 ===
Prior to the 2001 season, star free agent shortstop Alex Rodriguez, was signed by the Rangers in the most lucrative deal in baseball history: a ten-year, $252 million contract. The move was considered controversial and was frequently maligned by fans and writers who thought owner Tom Hicks was placing too much emphasis on one player instead of utilizing team resources to acquire several players, especially for a team that lacked pitching talent. Club officials maintained that Rodriguez would be the cornerstone of future postseason success. Although Rodriguez's individual performance was outstanding, the Rangers continued to struggle and manager Jerry Narron was fired following the 2002 season. He was replaced by seasoned manager Buck Showalter.

The 2003 season signified the fourth straight last-place finish, and after a postseason fallout between Rodriguez and club management, Rodriguez was traded to the New York Yankees for second baseman Alfonso Soriano and infielder prospect Joaquin Arias.

In the spring of 2009, Rodriguez admitted to using performance-enhancing drugs during his time with the Rangers. During the investigations into PED use earlier in the decade, several other former Rangers players were criticized for possible use of performance-enhancers. These included notable '90s sluggers Jose Canseco, Iván Rodríguez, Juan González, and Rafael Palmeiro.

=== 2004 ===
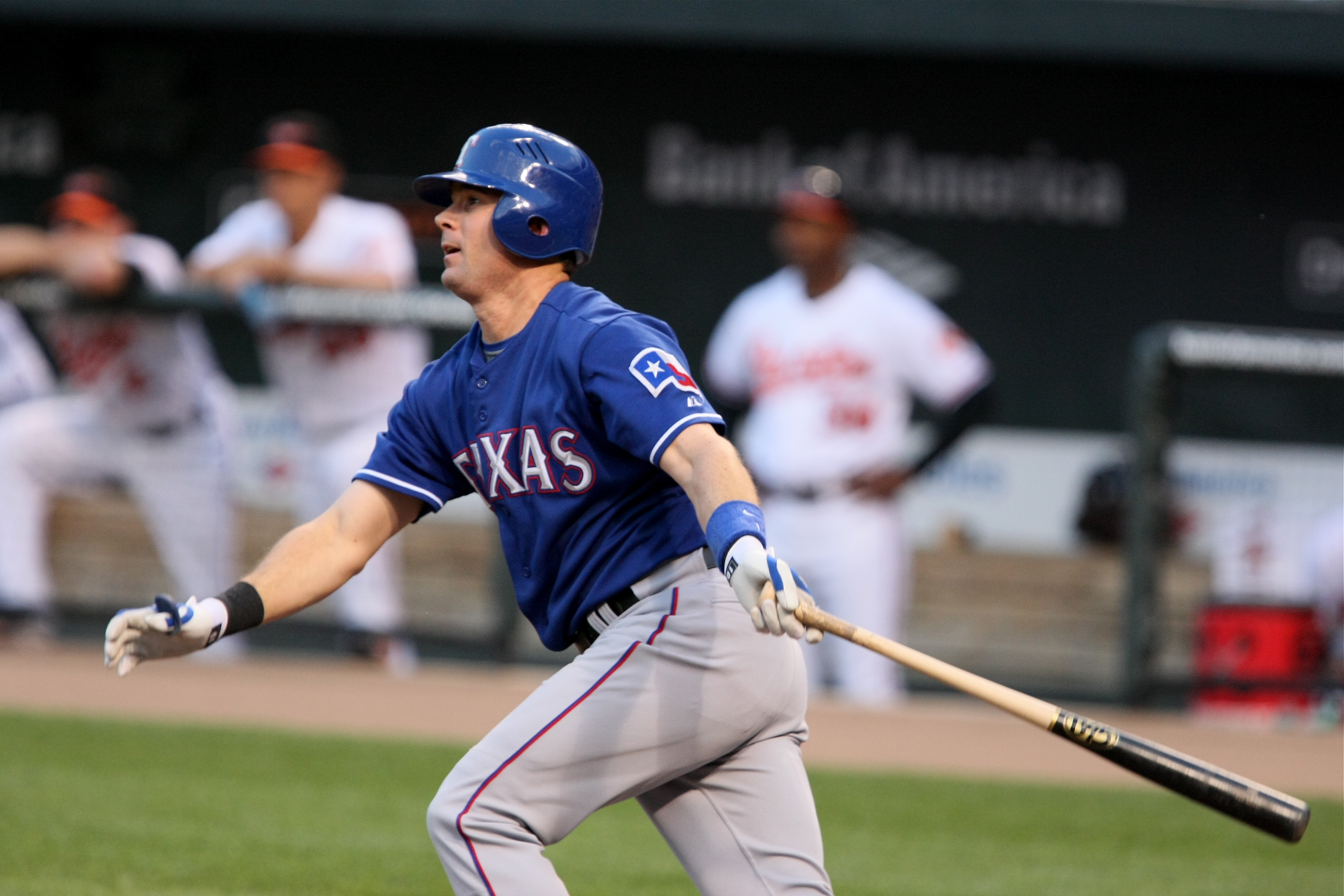
Michael Young

Prior to the 2004 season, little hope was held out for the Rangers to improve on their losing ways. However, the Rangers battled with the Anaheim Angels and Oakland Athletics for first place in the American League West for much of the season. Mark Teixeira, Alfonso Soriano, Michael Young, and Hank Blalock became some of the best-hitting infielders in the league, with Young, Blalock, and Soriano were named to the 2004 All-Star Game. Soriano was named the All-Star MVP after going 2 for 3 with a three-run home run. Late in September, the Oakland Athletics visited Arlington for a three-game series. After taking the first two games of the series, the Rangers trailed 4–2, in the bottom of the ninth. A loss would have dropped them to four games behind the Athletics. A home run by Hank Blalock and a dramatic two-out, two-run double by David Dellucci (known amongst fans as the "Dellucci Double") gave the Rangers a 5–4 win, one of the most memorable in club history. It also allowed the Rangers to sweep the first-place Athletics and leave them just two games behind with ten to play. Unfortunately, the Rangers ended up losing six of the final ten games and another turnaround season came up short. The club finished in third place behind the Angels and Athletics, a mere three games out of first place.

== 2005–2009 ==
=== 2005 ===
In 2005, the Rangers again struggled to find consistency amid controversy and injuries, notwithstanding that the team swept an entire homestand for the first time in its history. Frank Francisco and Carlos Almanzar, two key members of the bullpen, were sidelined for Tommy John surgery. Kenny Rogers, the team's ace pitcher, received a 20-game suspension from commissioner Bud Selig for attacking a cameraman at Ameriquest Field prior to a game. Management later placed opening day starter Ryan Drese on waivers, where he was claimed by the Washington Nationals. After Drese's release and Rogers' suspension, the Rangers' performance on the mound faltered, and a disastrous 1–12 August road trip all but sealed the squad's fate.

On October 4, 2005, the Rangers announced that John Hart would step down as general manager and that Jon Daniels was being promoted from assistant general manager to replace him. Daniels, at 28 years and one month, would become the youngest general manager in Major League history.

Daniels and the Rangers front office were very active in the 2005–06 offseason. Alfonso Soriano, who had often been mentioned in trade speculation, was finally dealt to the Nationals for outfielders Brad Wilkerson and Terrmel Sledge. The Rangers then began making moves to acquire pitching talent. The Rangers gained enigmatic starter Vicente Padilla from the Philadelphia Phillies in exchange for Ricardo Rodríguez and acquired San Diego Padres pitchers Adam Eaton and Akinori Otsuka in exchange for Chris Young, Adrián González, and Sledge. Finally, they signed free agent starter Kevin Millwood to a five-year contract worth $60 million.

=== 2006: Building the brand ===
The Rangers' 2006 season ended with a disappointing 80–82 record and a third-place finish in the American League West. Though the club showed strength in the early going, the team proved unable to keep pace with the surging Oakland Athletics in the second half and fell out of contention in September. To some extent the Rangers were the victims of bad luck, as their win–loss record was worse than their +51 run differential for the season would normally indicate. However, the element the club continued to lack was a solid pitching staff, whose combined ERA ranked 9th in the American League at the season's end. The Rangers were represented in the 2006 MLB All-Star Game by center fielder Gary Matthews, Jr. and shortstop Michael Young, who was named the MVP for his game-winning two-run triple in the ninth inning.

Significant player moves in-season included a July 28 deal acquiring outfielders Carlos Lee and Nelson Cruz from the Milwaukee Brewers in exchange for Kevin Mench, Francisco Cordero, and Laynce Nix.

On October 4 after two attempts to replicate the success of the 2004 team, the Rangers dismissed Buck Showalter as manager with three years left on his contract. A month later, the team announced that Oakland Athletics third base coach Ron Washington had accepted their offer to manage the team. A change at manager would be the first of several moves to strengthen the team in yet another busy off-season.

Gary Matthews, Jr., Mark DeRosa, Carlos Lee, and Adam Eaton all signed with other clubs as free agents. Vicente Padilla accepted a three-year, $33 million offer with an option for a fourth year at $12 million. The Rangers also signed first baseman/outfielder Frank Catalanotto to a multi-year deal. The Rangers later added reliever Éric Gagné and veteran outfielders Kenny Lofton and Sammy Sosa on short-term deals. In a sign that general manager Jon Daniels was looking for results in 2007, the Rangers' top pitching prospect John Danks was traded to the Chicago White Sox along with reliever Nick Masset for 23-year-old starter Brandon McCarthy. The Danks trade caused quite a stir amongst fans, many of which had followed the minor league careers of the highly touted "DVD" trio of pitchers that included Danks, Edinson Vólquez, and Thomas Diamond. All three pitchers would eventually reach the majors, with varying degrees of success, while McCarthy's career became marred by injury.

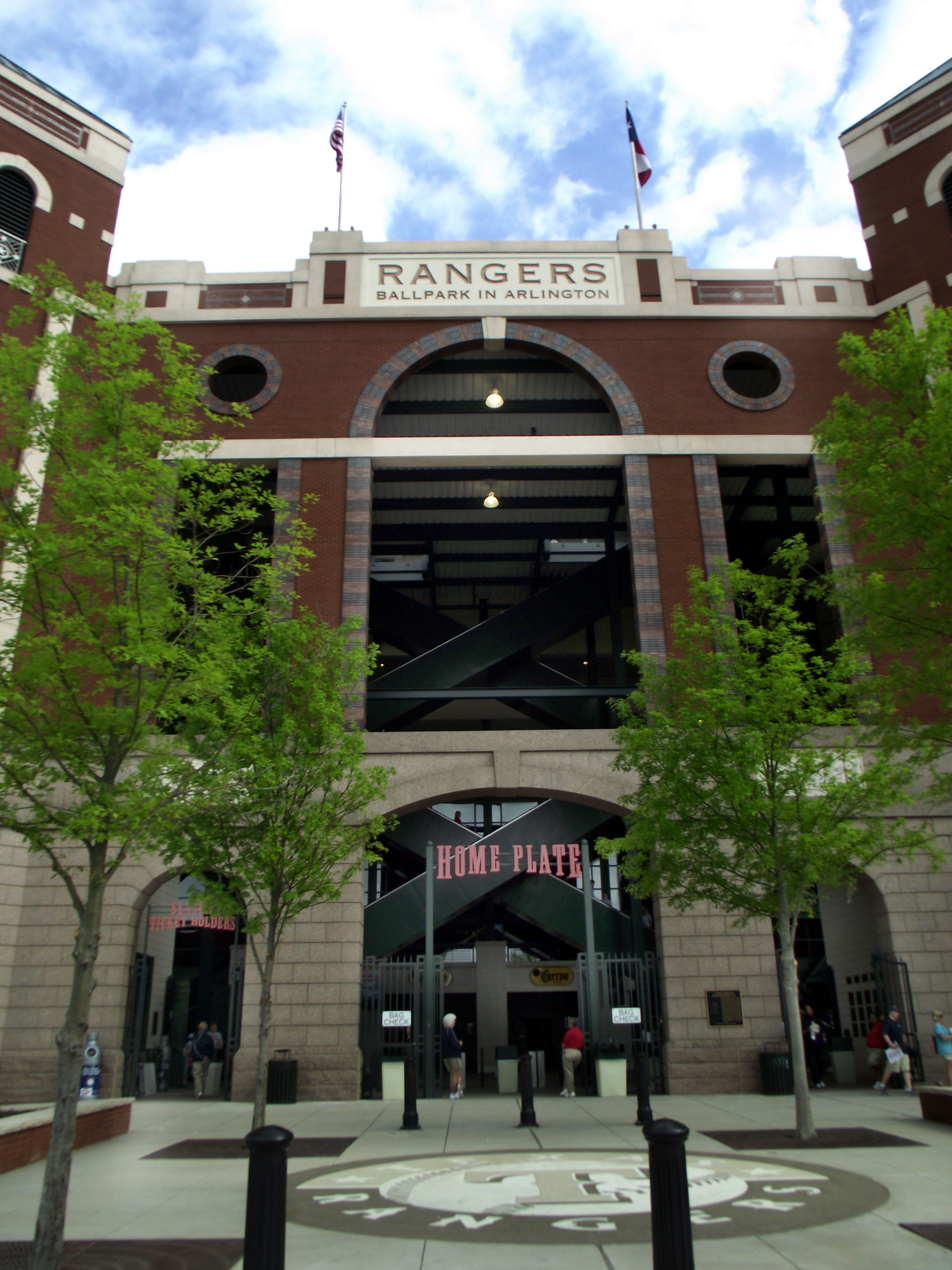
Home Plate Entrance at the Rangers Ballpark in Arlington

The Rangers previously negotiated a 30-year, $75 million stadium naming rights agreement with Ameriquest Mortgage Company in 2004, renaming the Ballpark "Ameriquest Field". Under the Ameriquest moniker, the Ballpark featured a replica of the Liberty Bell in the stands above the Diamond Club (representing Ameriquest's logo) that rang after home runs. In 2007, though, the Rangers announced the termination of the agreement with Ameriquest, and changed the name to Rangers Ballpark in Arlington. Club president Jeff Cogen cited that the team was more concerned about getting their name back on the ballpark than Ameriquest's public financial troubles. "It's all about the brand", Cogen said. The Rangers lost a reported $2.5 million per year from the lack of naming rights but regained advertising space given over to Ameriquest in the naming rights deal. Regardless of Cogen's comments, Ameriquest dissolved within months after the naming rights were terminated, and the company ended most business operations in September 2007.

=== 2007–2009: Financial troubles ===
The Rangers struggled offensively early in the season, despite playing in a notoriously hitter-friendly park. On June 20, Sammy Sosa hit his 600th career home run against the Chicago Cubs at the Rangers Ballpark in Arlington. Hank Blalock, the starting 3rd baseman who had been enjoying a good season, was placed on the 60-day disabled list on May 19 due to thoracic outlet syndrome, and Mark Teixeira followed him onto the disabled list on June 9 (for the first time in his career) with a strained left quadriceps muscle. With a record of 46–59 at the July 31 trade deadline, the team traded Mark Teixeira and Ron Mahay to the Atlanta Braves in a deal that would eventually bring five prospects to the Rangers organization, including four of Atlanta's top prospects Jarrod Saltalamacchia, Elvis Andrus, Matt Harrison, and Neftalí Feliz. The team also traded closer Éric Gagné to the Boston Red Sox for left-hander Kason Gabbard and Minor League outfielders David Murphy and Engel Beltre. These moves were the beginnings of a rebuilding project headed by Jon Daniels with a focus on the acquisition and development of young players. In the coming years, more club resources would be dedicated to improving the quality of the farm system and scouting departments, most notably in Latin America and the Far East. The objective of Daniels' plan was to field a legitimately competitive team by the 2010 season.

The 2007 season remains notable in the minds of baseball fans for two inexplicable oddities. On August 19 at the Metrodome, the Minnesota Twins logged 19 strikeouts against the Rangers, one short of the Major League record. Three days later, on August 22, in the first game of a doubleheader at Oriole Park at Camden Yards, the Rangers' bats came alive with a modern record for runs by one team, defeating the Baltimore Orioles 30–3. Their 27-run margin of victory is also a modern-day MLB record. Wes Littleton gained probably the easiest save in Major League history—entering the game in the bottom of the seventh, with his team already ahead 14–3, he pitched three innings finishing the game, and gave up just two hits and a walk.

The Rangers began the 2008 season red hot, headlined by newcomer Josh Hamilton who looked to be a threat to win the Triple Crown, before fading off as the season wore on. During the All-Star festivities at Yankee Stadium, Hamilton crushed a first round home run record in the 2008 Home Run Derby with 28. Hamilton hit another four in the second round and three during the final round, for a total of 35 home runs, but lost to the Twins' Justin Morneau. Four Rangers played in the 2008 Major League Baseball All-Star Game: Josh Hamilton, Ian Kinsler, Milton Bradley, and Michael Young, who would repeat his 2006 All-Star Game feat by driving in the winning run via a sac fly.

The Rangers would finish the season with yet another sub-.500 record (79–83), yet ended the season second in the American League West, the club's best finish since 1999. The off-season saw perennial All-Star shortstop Michael Young ask for a trade when the team told him he would be moving to third base to make room for rookie Elvis Andrus. After speaking with club president Nolan Ryan and his agent, Young later rescinded his trade request, and agreed to move to third base. The offseason also saw the departure of mercurial outfielder/designated hitter Milton Bradley to free agency.

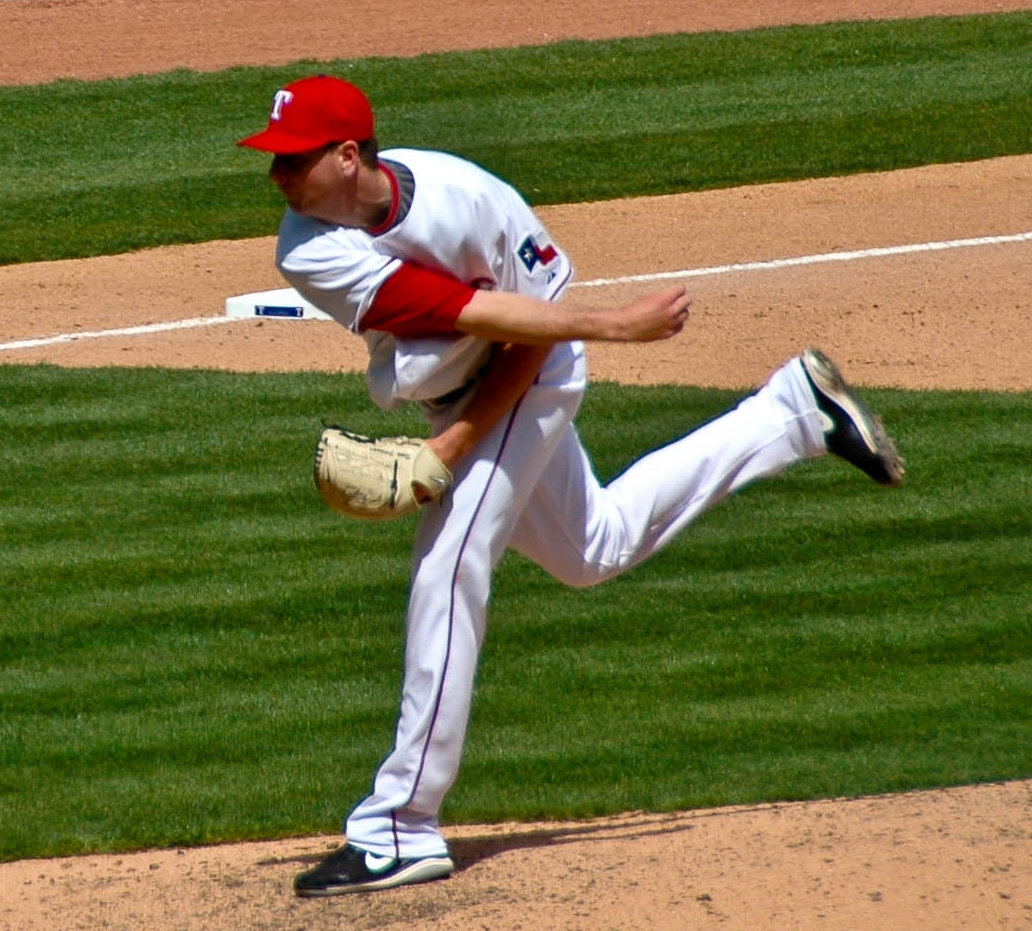
Scott Feldman

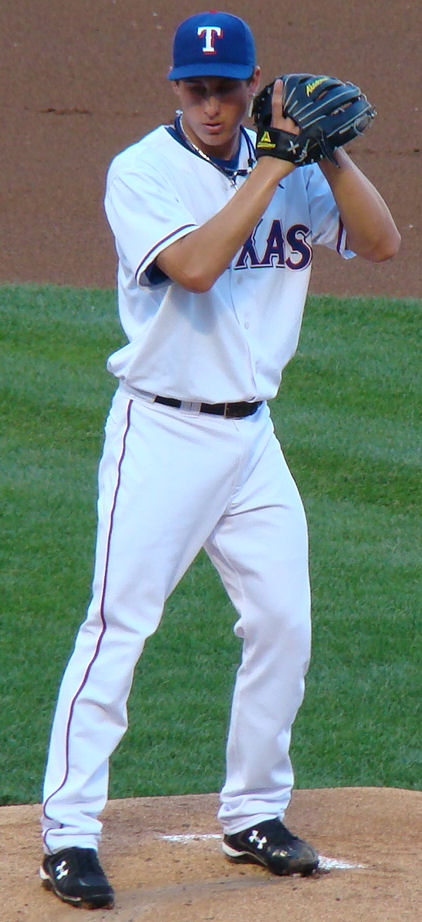
Derek Holland is considered the best pitching prospect drafted by the Rangers since the departure of John Danks

The 2009 season saw the Rangers soar into playoff contention for the first time since 2004. Despite injuries to Josh Hamilton and Ian Kinsler, the Rangers held first place in their division for long stretches of the summer before fading after September 1, losing the division to the Los Angeles Angels of Anaheim. The Rangers finished the season at 87–75, their first winning season since 2004 and good enough for second place in the American League West. Michael Young responded to his move to third base by posting one of his best offensive seasons ever while committing just nine errors and earning a sixth straight All-Star appearance. Josh Hamilton and Nelson Cruz were also named 2009 American League All-Stars. Several young stars with the club broke out including the debuts of highly rated rookies Elvis Andrus, Derek Holland, and Neftalí Feliz. Second baseman Ian Kinsler hit for the cycle in April, while having a 30–30 season in home runs and stolen bases. Starting pitcher Scott Feldman posted a fantastic season as well in 2009, finishing 3rd in the American League in wins with 17.

=== New ownership ===
While the 2009 season was strong on the field, club owner Tom Hicks became the focus of several reports indicating serious financial problems with his holding group, Hicks Sports Group, which also owned the Dallas Stars, the Frisco RoughRiders (the Rangers AA-farm club), 1/2 of Liverpool F.C. (sold in mid-October 2010 to New England Sports Ventures, owners of the Boston Red Sox), and the Mesquite Championship Rodeo (later sold by HSG). HSG was reported to have gone into default on a $525 million loan.

In April 2009, Hicks announced he would be willing to sell a minority interest in the team. Only one month later, Hicks announced he would be willing to sell majority control of the Rangers. In July 2009, it was reported that Hicks borrowed money from Major League Baseball to meet the team's payroll. After the 2009 season, Hicks began scouting prospective buyers and in December, entered into exclusive negotiating rights for sale of the Rangers with a consortium headed by Pittsburgh sports lawyer Chuck Greenberg and Rangers team president Nolan Ryan.

On January 22, 2010, Hicks Sports Group officially reached a formal agreement to sell the Texas Rangers to the group headed by Greenberg and Ryan (later called Rangers Baseball Express) for approximately $570 million. Under the provisions of the deal, former owner Hicks stayed on as a limited minority partner, but was not allowed to retain a seat on the board of governors. Co-lead investors Dallas businessmen Ray Davis, and Ft. Worth Bob R. Simpson were named co-chairmen. Hicks also sold much of the land surrounding Rangers Ballpark to Rangers Baseball Express in a separate deal.

The deal was subject to approval by the other MLB owners (a 3/4 vote is required) and completed by April 1. However, one of HSG's principal lenders (Monarch Alternative Capital) opposed the sale on grounds that the proceeds would not fully repay the defaulted HSG notes. On April 21, Major League Baseball issued a statement declaring the Rangers' sale to be under the control of the Commissioner to expedite the process. Because of public comments made by Hicks deemed detrimental to the process, MLB also stripped Hicks of any responsibility regarding the sale of the team. On May 13, MLB threatened to seize control of the rest of the team's operations if a deal was not completed by the deadline set by the Commissioner.

As the stalemate between HSG and its creditors continued, on May 24, 2010, the Texas Rangers filed for Chapter 11 Bankruptcy. As of that date, the Rangers and HSG had an estimated debt of $575 million. Much of the unsecured debt was owed in back salary. Officially, New York Yankees third baseman Alex Rodriguez topped the list of unsecured creditors with an estimated $24.9 million owed by the Rangers. Additionally, the Rangers also owed Baltimore Orioles pitcher Kevin Millwood $12.9 million, and current Rangers third baseman Michael Young $3.9 million. At a press conference, the Greenberg-Ryan group proposed to buy the team for $575 million. The sale would repay all the team's creditors, including players owed back salary.

After several attempts to resolve the deal fell through, the bankruptcy court ordered a public auction to be held on August 4. The Greenberg/Ryan bid would be the opening bid, and other offers (subject to MLB approval) would have to be submitted by the prior day in order to be considered. At the auction, only one other MLB-approved group submitted an offer—Radical Baseball LLC, a group formed by Houston businessman Jim Crane (who was previously unsuccessful in buying the Houston Astros) and Dallas Mavericks owner Mark Cuban (who was previously unsuccessful in buying the Chicago Cubs). The auction lasted until the early morning of August 5, with the winning bid submitted by Greenberg/Ryan. The bankruptcy court approved the bid later that morning and the bankruptcy case closed. The sale to the Greenberg/Ryan was approved by all 30 MLB owners at the owners meeting in Minneapolis on Thursday August 12.

I'll be the managing partner and CEO. If you like what's going on or you don't like what's going on, I take responsibility for that. When it comes to baseball, I'm not going to interject my opinions. If Nolan and [Jon Daniels] want to discuss something with me, they can, but I have complete faith and trust in the decisions that they make. I'll be as involved as they wish me to be, but with complete faith and confidence in them. What I'm going to focus on, particularly since the baseball side is in great shape, is the business side. How do we connect with the community? How do we create a higher tempo of energy in the front office? How can we do a better job of filling the stands and make an impact on people's lives? If we succeed on the business side and continue on path on the baseball side and combine it with a dynamic market like this is, we can be and should be one of the powerhouse franchises in baseball.

— Chuck Greenberg

The new ownership group, which included Chuck Greenberg and Nolan Ryan, was called Rangers Baseball Express, LLC and had Greenberg serving as managing general partner and Ryan as club president. Again, co-lead investors Ray Davis and Bob R. Simpson were named co-chairmen. In March 2011, Greenberg resigned as Chief Executive and Managing General Partner and sold his interest in the club following a "falling out" with his partners. Following Greenberg's resignation, Ryan was named chief executive officer in addition to his continuing role as team President. Ryan was subsequently designated the controlling owner of the club by a unanimous vote of the 30 owners of Major League Baseball on May 12, 2011. Co-chairmen Simpson and Davis stated they would not be involved in day-to-day operations.

== 2010–2016: Rise to contention ==
=== First pennant: 2010 ===
Offseason moves made by the Rangers sent Kevin Millwood to the Baltimore Orioles and acquired free agents Rich Harden, Colby Lewis, and Vladimir Guerrero. With the new influx of talent and success in 2009, the Rangers entered the season with expecting to compete for the division and achieve the front office's goals of 2007. During the offseason, Texas Rangers' team President Nolan Ryan spoke about the Rangers' chances in the upcoming season by saying,

My expectations today are that we're going to be extremely competitive and if we don't win our division, I'll be disappointed.

— Nolan Ryan, ESPNDallas.com: January 26, 2010.

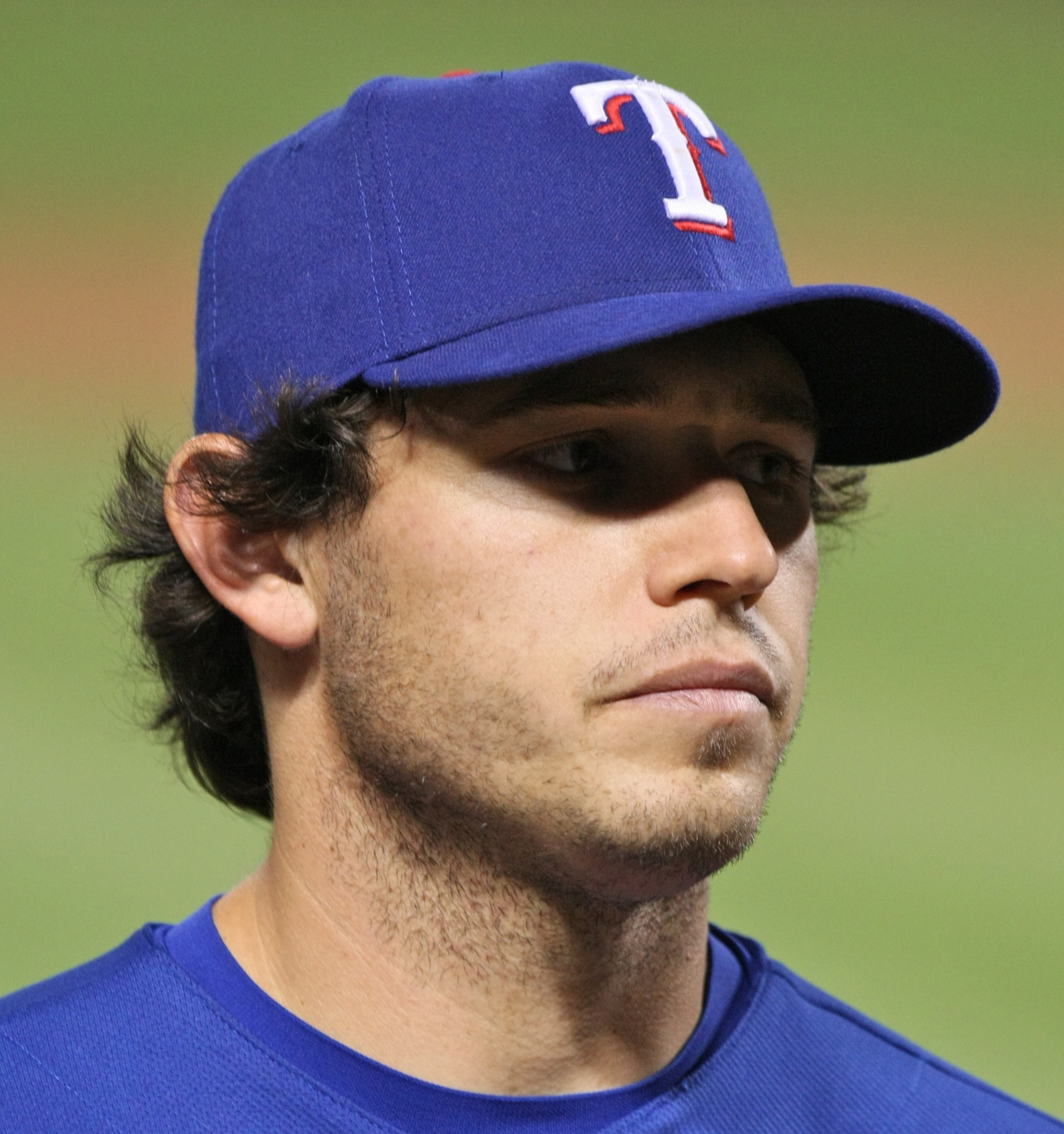
Ian Kinsler

After stumbling out of the gates with a sub-.500 start in April, the Rangers took the division lead with a franchise-best month of June, going 21–6. The Rangers would never relinquish first place after an 11-game winning streak. On July 9, the club dealt one of its top prospects, Justin Smoak, with two other minor leaguers to the Seattle Mariners for former Cy Young Award winner Cliff Lee and Mark Lowe. The Rangers also made moves to acquire veterans Bengie Molina, Jorge Cantú, Cristian Guzmán, and Jeff Francoeur. In the 2010 All-Star Game, the team was represented by Lee, Guerrero, Ian Kinsler, Josh Hamilton, Elvis Andrus, and Neftalí Feliz. After the All-Star Game, came the debut of the claw and antler hand gestures, which gained much popularity, especially after the release of various apparel and souvenir options for the fans. Foam claws and helmets with deer antlers became quite commonplace in the ballpark as the Rangers played further into the fall. The Rangers won the A.L. West on September 25, advancing to the postseason for the first time since 1999.

==== 2010 postseason ====
After winning the AL West with a 90–72 record, the Rangers entered the playoffs for the first time since 1999, and faced the Tampa Bay Rays for the first round, which ultimately resulted in a 3–2 series victory and marked the first postseason series victory in the 50-year history of the Rangers/Washington Senators franchise. Facing the Rangers in the American League Championship Series were the defending World Champion New York Yankees, the team the Rangers failed against three separate times in the 1990s. In the playoffs, the Rangers record against the Yankees was 1–9. In a 6-game series, the Texas Rangers came out victorious, winning the first Pennant in franchise history in front of an ecstatic home crowd. Josh Hamilton was awarded ALCS MVP after setting a series record for intentional walks. The Texas Rangers faced the San Francisco Giants in the 2010 World Series. The Rangers offense struggled against the Giants' young pitching and eventually lost the Series 4–1, the lone win coming in Arlington on October 30. For the first time, the Rangers ended their season in the month of November.

=== 2011: Repeat AL champions ===
The Rangers successfully defended their AL West Division title in 2011, making the club's second straight division title and postseason appearance and fifth division title and postseason appearance overall. The Rangers set records for best record (96–66 with a .592 winning percentage) and home attendance (2,946,949). On October 15, they went back to the World Series, beating the Detroit Tigers 15–5 in Game 6 of the ALCS. The series featured Nelson Cruz hitting six home runs, the most home runs by one player in a playoff series in MLB history. In game two, Cruz also became the first player in postseason history to win a game with a walk-off grand slam as the Rangers defeated the Tigers 7–3 in 11 innings. However, they would proceed to lose the World Series in seven games to the Cardinals.

=== 2012: Staff changes ===
The Rangers did a lot of retooling in the 2011–2012 off season. Staff ace C. J. Wilson left the team to join the division rival Los Angeles Angels of Anaheim. The Angels also upgraded their offense with the signing of Albert Pujols, causing more parity within the division. The Rangers responded by signing Yu Darvish of the Nippon Ham Fighters of the Central League in Nippon Professional Baseball of Japan. The team also converted closer Neftalí Feliz to a starting pitcher upon signing Joe Nathan to take over closing duties in the bullpen. The Rangers would not repeat as AL West champions, but would qualify for the postseason as the top wild card team in the AL. They would lose the wild card game to the Orioles.

=== 2013–2014: Missed postseasons ===
In 2013, the Rangers finished 91–71, which tied them with Tampa Bay for the final wild card position. The Rangers would lose the tie-breaker game to the Rays 5–2. In 2014, the Rangers slumped to their first losing season since 2008. Late in the season, manager Ron Washington resigned, citing personal reasons.

=== 2015–2016: Back-to-back AL West champions ===
In 2015, under new manager Jeff Banister, the Rangers overcame a slow start to win the AL West. The club was aided by the trade deadline acquisition of pitcher Cole Hamels. On the last day of the regular season, Hamels would pitch a complete game in a victory over the Angels that clinched the division for the Rangers. In the Division Series against the Toronto Blue Jays, the Rangers would win the first two games in Toronto, but then lose three straight to end their season.

In 2016, the Rangers repeated as AL West champions with the best record in the AL. They would face the Blue Jays again in the ALDS. This time, the Blue Jays swept the series.

=== 2017: Missed postseason ===
With a returning top bullpen and new recruits, the Rangers had hopes of postseason success. However, they ended their 2017 season 78–84, and tied for 3rd in the AL West.

=== 2018: Staff changes ===
The Rangers finished their season 67–95, and finished 5th place in the AL West. With little success the previous seasons, Jeff Banister was fired as club manager. Rangers bench coach, Don Wakamatsu, was promoted to interim manager for the final games of the season. After the season concluded, the Rangers decided on Chris Woodward to be the new team manager.

=== 2019–2022: Rebuilding ===
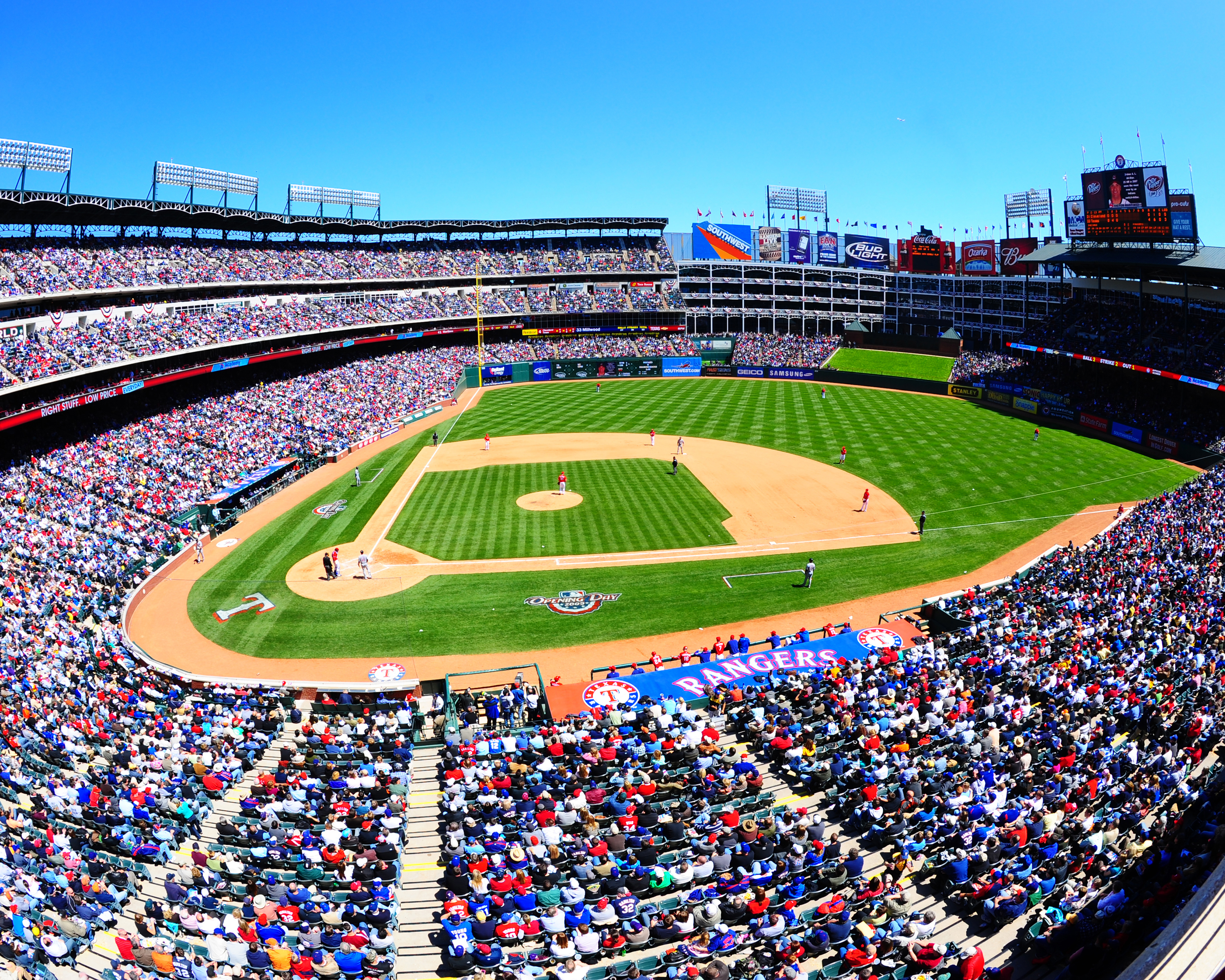
Globe Life Park in Arlington (2009)

This season's opener was on March 28, and it acted as the final opening day game at the stadium. The final season at Globe Life Park (not to be confused with the new Globe Life Field) marked the end of an era. The Ranger's new manager, Chris Woodward, explained the direction of the 2019 season:

"Results are important, don't get me wrong. But this season is also about redefining our definition of success."

— Chris Woodward, DallasObserver.com: March 27, 2019

The Rangers finished the 2019 season with a 78–84 record, which placed them third in the American League West.

The club moved into their new stadium, Globe Life Field, for the 2020 season. During the pandemic-shortened 60-game season, the Rangers posted a league-worst 22–38 record. After the season, Elvis Andrus, the last player who had remained with the team after their 2011 World Series run, was traded to the Oakland Athletics.

In 2021, the Rangers once again finished last in the AL West with a 60–102 record. The 2022 season, despite the acquisitions of middle infielders Marcus Semien and Corey Seager, saw minimal improvement for the club, as they finished fourth with a 68–94 record.

== 2023-present: The Bruce Bochy era and first World Series Championship ==
While the 2023 World Series championship represents a historic achievement, it is part of a longer continuum of franchise milestones. The Rangers’ evolution from their early struggles, including decades without postseason success, provides important context for understanding the significance of this victory. The Rangers hired three time World Series-winning manager Bruce Bochy—bringing him out of retirement after 4 seasons—and signed star pitchers Jacob deGrom and Nathan Eovaldi in the 2022-23 offseason. In 2023, despite injuries to many star players, most notably deGrom, who had Tommy John surgery in June, the team would improve their record from the previous season by 22 games with an 90–72 record, while playing in the postseason for the first time since 2016 with the help of mid-season pitching acquisitions Max Scherzer and Jordan Montgomery and September call-up and top prospect Evan Carter.

The Rangers led the AL West for much of the 2023 season. However, the Houston Astros would take the division on the season's final day due to a Rangers loss to Seattle and the Astros owning the tiebreaker via winning the regular season series between the two clubs.

The Rangers went on to sweep the Tampa Bay Rays in two games in their wild card series for their first postseason series win since 2011. They would then follow that up with a three-game sweep of the top seeded Baltimore Orioles in the ALDS to advance to the 2023 ALCS.

In the ALCS, the Rangers defeated bitter division rival Houston Astros 4 games to 3, in a series where every game was won by the road team. The Rangers thus advanced to the 2023 World Series and defeated the Arizona Diamondbacks 4 games to 1 to win the franchise's first World Series title.
