= Ed Doherty (baseball executive) =

- Born: March 30, 1900; Providence, Rhode Island, U.S.
- Died: July 8, 1971 (aged 71); Winchester, Massachusetts, U.S.
- Occupation: Baseball executive
- Years active: 1940–1970

Edward Sylvester Doherty Jr. (March 30, 1900 – July 8, 1971) was an American front office executive in minor league and Major League Baseball. He served as the first general manager in the history of the second modern-era Washington Senators franchise (now the Texas Rangers), from the expansion team's formation following the 1960 season through the end of the 1962 campaign. Born in Providence, Rhode Island, he was a graduate of Providence College's Class of 1924.

== Minor league executive ==
Doherty joined Washington after spending the previous 7½ seasons as president of one of the three Triple-A minor leagues of the day, the American Association. Doherty's earlier career included working as a journalist in his native Providence, a 1940–46 stint in the front office of the Boston Red Sox as publicity director, and six seasons (1947–52) as president of Boston farm teams—the Scranton Red Sox of the Class A Eastern League and the Louisville Colonels of the American Association.

After assuming the Association's presidency in 1953, he led the league through a tumultuous time during which it lost (or would lose) some of its most important cities—traditional powers Milwaukee, Kansas City, Minneapolis and St. Paul, as well as new entry Houston—to Major League franchise shifts and planned expansion. He also faced a threat from a potential third Major League, the Continental League, that would have taken many of those same markets had it been born. With the loss of Milwaukee and Kansas City, and struggles in less successful venues (Toledo and Columbus), Doherty oversaw the Association's expansion into markets such as Charleston, Denver, Omaha, Wichita, Houston, Dallas and Fort Worth, during that period.

Doherty was one of the most vocal opponents of Major League Baseball expansion, leading the minor leagues' resistance to rumored plans at the 1959 baseball winter meetings. Ironically, Doherty would gain his Major League general manager job when the American League's original Washington franchise decamped for the American Association's Minneapolis and St. Paul territories after 1960 to become the Minnesota Twins, creating an opening for an expansion club in the U.S. capital.

== The expansion Senators ==
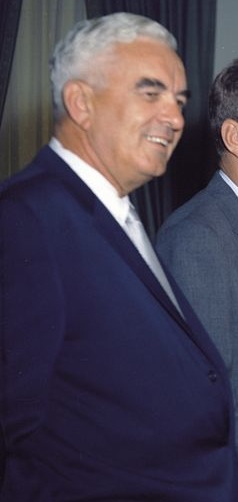
Doherty in 1961

Doherty was appointed by the new Senators' first majority owner, Elwood "Pete" Quesada, a retired United States Air Force general, and his first task was to sign a manager and draft players. He selected as his skipper Mickey Vernon, longtime Washington fan favorite from the 1940s and 1950s as a first baseman and two-time batting champion, and a member of the 1960 World Series champion Pittsburgh Pirates coaching staff. He drafted well-known veterans such as Dick Donovan, Bobby Shantz, Gene Woodling and Dale Long in the expansion lottery, then traded Shantz to Pittsburgh to acquire a package of players that included pitcher Bennie Daniels, who would lead the 1961 Senators in victories.

Predictably, the new Senators struggled in their maiden season, losing 100 games and finishing tied for last place in the ten-team American League. Seeking improvement on the field and a drawing card at the gate as the Senators prepared to move into the new DC Stadium for 1962, Doherty traded Donovan, the 1961 AL earned run average champion, and his leading home run hitter, catcher/outfielder Gene Green, to the Cleveland Indians for charismatic veteran center fielder Jimmy Piersall, coming off one of his best seasons. But Piersall struggled in Washington, batting only .244, and the 1962 Senators lost 101 games and finished, by themselves, in the basement. Donovan, meanwhile, won 20 games for Cleveland. During the season, Doherty and Vernon were publicly criticized by owner Quesada because of the Senators' poor showing. At the close of the campaign, Quesada sold his share in the Senators, and Doherty was replaced as GM by George Selkirk, the former New York Yankees' star.

Doherty's departure from the Senator front office did not signal the end of his career in baseball, nor with the team. He returned to the minor leagues in 1963 as general manager of the Double-A Nashville Vols, an affiliate of the Los Angeles Angels. When the Nashville club disbanded after one season, Doherty went to work in the office of Ford Frick, the Commissioner of Baseball, as Frick's liaison to NCAA baseball programs. Then, in 1969, he was engaged by the Senators as an off-field assistant to manager Ted Williams, the Red Sox' former superstar and Hall of Famer then in his first year at the Washington helm.

Two years later, Doherty died at age 71 in Winchester, Massachusetts. He was elected to the Providence College Athletics Hall of Fame in 1971, the year of his passing.

Sporting positions
Preceded by Bruce Dudley	American Association President; 1953–1960	Succeeded by Jim Burris
Preceded by Franchise established	Washington Senators General Manager; 1961–1962	Succeeded by George Selkirk
