= George Selkirk =

Canadian baseball player (1908–1987)

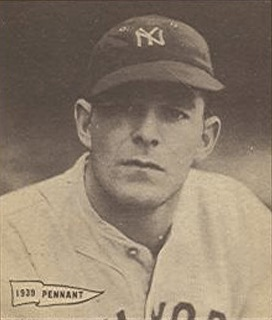
- Outfielder
- Born: January 4, 1908; Huntsville, Ontario, Canada
- Died: January 19, 1987 (aged 79); Fort Lauderdale, Florida, U.S.
- Batted: Left Threw: Right

MLB debut
- August 12, 1934, for the New York Yankees

Last MLB appearance
- September 27, 1942, for the New York Yankees

MLB statistics
- Batting average: .290
- Home runs: 108
- Runs batted in: 576
- Stats at Baseball Reference

Teams
- New York Yankees (1934–1942)

Career highlights and awards
- 2× All-Star (1936, 1939); 5× World Series champion (1936–1939, 1941)

Member of the Canadian

Baseball Hall of Fame
- Induction: 1983

George Alexander Selkirk (January 4, 1908 – January 19, 1987) was a Canadian outfielder and front office executive in Major League Baseball. In 1935, Selkirk succeeded Babe Ruth as the right fielder of the New York Yankees—and also inherited Ruth's fabled No. 3 uniform (which was not retired until 1948, the year of Ruth's death).

Over the next eight seasons, Selkirk batted over .300 five times, twice drove home more than 100 RBIs, played in five World Championships (1936, 1937, 1938, 1939 and 1941), and made the American League All-Star team in 1936 and 1939.

George Selkirk was inducted into the Canadian Baseball Hall of Fame in 1983, its initial year, and was later inducted into the Ontario Sports Hall of Fame in 2005.

== Playing career ==
A native of Huntsville, Ontario, Selkirk batted left-handed and threw right-handed, standing 6 feet 1 inch (1.85 m) tall and weighing 182 pounds (83 kg) (13 stone). His family moved to Rochester, New York, where Selkirk attended Rochester Technical School. His professional career began in 1927.

During his nine years of Major League Baseball service, all with the Yankees, Selkirk appeared in 846 games, batting .290 (.265 in 21 World Series games), with 108 regular-season home runs, 131 doubles, 41 triples, 810 hits, and 576 runs batted in (RBI). He recorded an on-base percentage of .400 and a slugging percentage of .483. Selkirk earned the nickname "Twinkletoes" for his distinctive way of running on the balls of his feet.

Selkirk twice in his career recorded eight RBI in one game, both against the Philadelphia A's at Yankee Stadium, on August 10, 1935, and August 12, 1938.

== Post-playing career ==
After military service in World War II in the United States Navy, Selkirk managed at the Class A and Triple-A levels for the Yankees, and at Triple-A in the farm system of the Milwaukee Braves. In 1953, he was named the American Association Manager of the Year, having led the Toledo Sox to the league's best regular-season record.

Selkirk later worked as the player personnel director for the Kansas City Athletics (1957–1959) and field coordinator of player development of the Baltimore Orioles (1960–1962) before becoming the second general manager in the history of the expansion Washington Senators (now the Texas Rangers) in the autumn of 1962.

The Senators were chronically short of funds and never developed a strong farm system, forcing Selkirk to acquire players (such as the great slugger Frank Howard) through trades and fill out the roster with waiver-price acquisitions. Nonetheless, Washington improved every year from 1963 through 1967, but when the team's field manager, Gil Hodges, departed for the New York Mets after the 1967 campaign, the Senators regressed and fell back into the American League basement. The December 1967 death of James M. Johnston, one of the club's two principal owners, forced the sale of the team in the autumn of 1968, and Selkirk was fired during the transition. He then returned to the Yankees as a scout.

Selkirk is mentioned in August Wilson's 1987 Pulitzer Prize-winning play, Fences. The protagonist, Troy, confident that he can do better than white ballplayers in the majors, alludes to Selkirk and the .269 average he put up in 1940, his last year as a regular in the Yankee lineup. His successful career as a player, and the respect he earned as a general manager, earned Selkirk a place in the Canadian Baseball Hall of Fame.

== Death ==
Selkirk died at age 79 in Fort Lauderdale, Florida.

== See also ==
- List of Major League Baseball career on-base percentage leaders
- List of Major League Baseball career OPS leaders
- List of Major League Baseball players from Canada

Sporting positions
Preceded by Ed Doherty	Washington Senators General Manager; 1962–1968	Succeeded by Bob Short
