= Oneida, Pennsylvania =

Unincorporated community in Pennsylvania, US

Oneida
- Census-designated place
- Location of Oneida in Pennsylvania Oneida (the United States)
- Coordinates: 40°54′27″N 76°7′31″W
- Country: United States
- State: Pennsylvania
- County: Schuylkill

Government

Area
  - Total: 0.17 sq mi (0.44 km^{2})
  - Land: 0.17 sq mi (0.44 km^{2})
  - Water: 0 sq mi (0.00 km^{2})

Population (2020)
  - Total: 263
  - Density: 1,542.6/sq mi (595.62/km^{2})
- Time zone: UTC-5 (Eastern (EST))
  - Summer (DST): UTC-4 (EDT)
- ZIP Code: 18242
- FIPS code: 42-56816
- GNIS feature ID: 2389621

Oneida is a census-designated place (CDP) in East Union Township, Pennsylvania. The population was 219 at the 2000 census.

== Geography ==
According to the U.S. Census Bureau, Oneida has a total area of 0.2 square miles (0.52 km^{2}), all land.

== Demographics ==
Historical population
Census	Pop.	Note	%±
2020	263		—
U.S. Decennial Census

At the 2000 census, there were 219 people, 112 households, and 57 families living in the CDP. The population density was 1,205.6 inhabitants per square mile (465.5/km^{2}). There were 135 housing units at an average density of 743.2 per square mile (287.0/km^{2}). The racial makeup of the CDP was 100.00% White. Of the 112 households 16.1% had children under the age of 18 living with them, 38.4% were married couples living together, 7.1% had a female householder with no husband present, and 49.1% were non-families. 42.9% of households were one person and 25.9% were one person aged 65 or older. The average household size was 1.96 and the average family size was 2.70.

The age distribution was 14.2% under the age of 18, 7.3% from 18 to 24, 26.0% from 25 to 44, 21.9% from 45 to 64, and 30.6% 65 or older. The median age was 49 years. For every 100 females, there were 90.4 males. For every 100 females age 18 and over, there were 82.5 males.

The median household income was $25,250 and the median family income was $28,250. Males had a median income of $27,917 versus $20,250 for females. The per capita income for the CDP was $18,756. About 3.8% of families and 2.2% of the population were below the poverty line, including none of those under the age of eighteen and 6.5% of those sixty five or over.

== Notable person ==
Jim Honochick, former Major League Baseball umpire

== Education ==
The Hazleton Area School District covers the CDP. The zoned public high school is Hazleton Area High School in Hazle Township.
