= XTO Energy =

American energy company, principally operating in North America

XTO Energy Inc.
- Formerly: Cross Timbers Oil Company
- Type: Subsidiary
- Industry: Petroleum industry
- Founded: 1986; 40 years ago
- Founder: Bob R. Simpson, Steve Palko, Jon Brumley
- Headquarters: Spring, Texas, United States
- Number of locations: Arkansas, Colorado, Kansas, Louisiana, Montana, New Mexico, North Dakota, Ohio, Oklahoma, Pennsylvania, Texas, Utah, West Virginia, Wyoming, Western Canada, Neuquen
- Key people: Staale Gjervik (president)
- Products: Petroleum; Natural gas
- Parent: ExxonMobil
- Website: xtoenergy.com

XTO Energy Inc. is an American energy company and subsidiary of ExxonMobil principally operating in North America. Acquired by ExxonMobil in 2010 and based out of Spring, Texas, it is involved with the production, processing, transportation, and development of oil and natural gas resources. The company specializes in developing shale gas via unconventional means like hydraulic fracturing and horizontal drilling.

ExxonMobil's acquisition of XTO made it the largest producer of natural gas in the U.S. Since then, XTO Energy's resource portfolio has tripled through several acquisitions. The company owns interests in approximately 40,000 active oil and natural gas sites across North America, with locations in Arkansas, Colorado, Kansas, Louisiana, Montana, New Mexico, North Dakota, Ohio, Oklahoma, Pennsylvania, Texas, Utah, West Virginia, Wyoming and Western Canada.

== History ==
=== Early history ===
XTO Energy was founded in 1986, and was initially called Cross Timbers Oil Company. The company was started by Bob R. Simpson, Steve Palko and Jon Brumley with US$35 million raised by former Goldman Sachs co-chairman Robert Rubin. Initially, the company purchased and developed long-lived oil and gas production properties. The company went public in 1993.

In 1996, Bob R. Simpson, one of the company's founders, became chairman and chief executive officer. Simpson received his undergraduate and master's degrees in finance from Baylor University. After Simpson took over, the company changed its strategy, from an even split of oil production and natural gas to focusing more heavily on natural gas. In June 2001, the company changed its name from Cross Timbers Oil Company to XTO Energy Inc., to reflect the company's new focus on natural gas rather than oil. "XTO" was chosen as it was the company's stock ticker symbol. The company continued to grow through the acquisition and development of oil and natural gas properties, and in 2002 XTO Energy was ranked 5th on Fortune's "100 Fastest Growing Companies" list.

=== ExxonMobil purchase ===
On December 14, 2009, ExxonMobil agreed to acquire XTO Energy Inc. through a merger. ExxonMobil acquired XTO Energy in a deal valued at $36 billion, involving the issuance of 416 million shares of stock and assuming the company's $11 billion in debt. The deal increased ExxonMobil's U.S. natural gas production to 3.68 billion cubic feet per day, making it the largest producer in the U.S. The purchase by ExxonMobil was the largest by the company since the deal that created ExxonMobil in 1999. The acquisition was finalized in June 2010.

=== 2011 - present ===
In June 2011, ExxonMobil acquired two natural gas companies in Pennsylvania—Phillips Resources Inc. and TWP Inc.—for $1.69 billion. After the acquisition, both companies were managed by XTO Energy. The acquisition added about 317,000 acres in Marcellus Shale to ExxonMobil's portfolio. In August of the same year, ExxonMobil leveraged XTO Energy's expertise in a trade with Russian oil company Rosneft in a deal worth $3.2 billion, giving ExxonMobil access to oil and gas opportunities in the Russian Arctic.

In September 2012, ExxonMobil and XTO Energy signed a land exchange agreement with Denbury Onshore LLC, acquiring 196,000 acres in the Bakken Shale in North Dakota and Montana. In exchange for the acreage, Denbury Onshore received $1.6 billion in cash and operating interests in the Hartzog Draw Field in Wyoming and the Webster Field in Texas.

During 2013, XTO Energy expanded its production in the Appalachian region of the U.S. by nearly 30%.

In February 2014, XTO Energy agreed to let American Energy–Utica LLC buy into 30,000 acres of its holdings in the Utica Shale located in the Harrison, Jefferson and Belmont counties of Ohio.

As of 2014, the size of XTO Energy's resource portfolio had tripled since it was acquired by ExxonMobil in 2010.

In August 2015, Exxon Mobil Corporation signed two agreements to drill on 48,000 acres in the core of the Midland Basin to be operated by XTO Energy. XTO operates 11 horizontal and four vertical rigs across 1.5 million net acres in Texas' Permian Basin.

== Grants to petroleum educational institutions ==
In 2008, XTO Energy began supporting Navarro College's petroleum technology certificate program. Since 2009, XTO Energy has partnered with Habitat for Humanity to build homes in Fort Worth. In 2010, XTO Energy and ExxonMobil gave a $5 million grant to Colorado State University to fund studies on the impact of oil and gas drilling on wildlife. The grant resulted in 20 research projects.

In April 2013, XTO Energy gave $100,000 to Butler County Community College. The funds helped establish a petroleum technology training center. Also in 2013, XTO Energy donated $200,000 to the American Red Cross to support efforts to help Colorado communities with natural disaster protection and recovery.

In April 2014, XTO Energy donated $25,000 in the form of grants to Westmoreland County Community College east of Pittsburgh to help students enrolled in the Petroleum Industrial Processing Operations Technology program offset tuition and travel costs, as well as purchase equipment for the school. Also in 2014, XTO Energy donated 21 historic Navajo blankets to the Farmington Museum in New Mexico; the blankets were valued at $175,000.

In 2015, XTO contributed $5 million to the North Dakota Housing Incentive Fund, supporting the construction of low-cost apartments for teachers and emergency personnel. The donation was the largest since the fund was established in 2011.

== Regulatory issues ==
In July 2013, XTO agreed with the U.S. Environmental Protection Agency to pay a $100,000 fine for a November 2010 water spill at a Pennsylvania water recycling operation. In September 2013, the Pennsylvania Attorney General filed criminal charges against XTO, stemming from this incident.

In October 2013, the federal Office of Natural Resources Revenue issued a $648,000 civil penalty against XTO for not providing data regarding a federal lease in Kansas. XTO has stated that it did provide the required records, but that the process was time-consuming. As of 2013, XTO Energy had requested a hearing on the matter.

In April 2015, a study published by researchers at Southern Methodist University (SMU) in Dallas allegedly connected two XTO-operated wastewater disposal wells with a series of earthquakes in Azle, Texas, occurring in 2013. In August 2015, preliminary findings by investigators with the Texas Railroad Commission found a disposal well operated near Azle by XTO Energy was unlikely to have caused the seismic activity, which contradicted the SMU study. In November 2015, the final decision by the Texas Railroad Commission unanimously agreed with hearing examiners that there was not enough evidence to support findings that the wells contributed to seismic activity and that XTO should be able to maintain its permit for the wells.
