= Washington Senators (1961–1971) =

Former baseball team in Washington

Logo	Cap insignia

Information
- League: American League (1961–1971); East Division (1969–1971)
- Ballpark: Robert F. Kennedy Memorial Stadium (1962–1971)
- Established: 1961
- Relocated: 1972 (to Dallas–Fort Worth; became the Texas Rangers)
- Former ballpark: Griffith Stadium (1961)
- Colors: Red, blue, white
- Ownership: List of owners: Elwood Richard Quesada (1961–1962); James Johnston (1963–1967); James Lemon (1963–1968); Bob Short (1969–1971)
- General manager: List of general managers: Ed Doherty (1961–1962); George Selkirk (1963–1968)
- Manager: List of managers: Mickey Vernon (1961–1963); Eddie Yost (1963); Gil Hodges (1963–1967); Jim Lemon (1968); Ted Williams (1969–1971)

The Washington Senators were a professional baseball team based in Washington, D.C. The Senators competed in Major League Baseball (MLB) as one of the American League's first expansion franchises. The club was founded in Washington, D.C. in 1961 to replace the recently departed original American League Washington Senators who moved to Minnesota as the Minnesota Twins. Following the 1971 season, the team relocated to Dallas–Fort Worth, where they were renamed the Texas Rangers.

The 11-year tenure in Washington, D.C. saw the team plagued with poor performances, losing an average of 94 games a season. The team's struggles spawned the joke: "Washington: first in war, first in peace and still last in the American League." Their only winning season was in 1969 when Hall of Famer Ted Williams managed the club to an 86–76 record, placing fourth in the AL East.

The team played their inaugural season at old Griffith Stadium, then moved to the new District of Columbia Stadium in 1962 under a ten-year lease.

The Washington Senators had an overall win–loss record of 740–1,032–1 (.418) during their 11 years in Washington, D.C.. The only former Washington Senators player elected to the National Baseball Hall of Fame is Minnie Miñoso, who only spent one season with the team.

== History ==
=== Founding ===
When the original Washington Senators announced their move to Minnesota in 1960 to become the Twins in 1961, Major League Baseball decided to expand a year earlier than planned to stave off the twin threats of competition from the proposed Continental League and loss of its exemption from the Sherman Antitrust Act. As part of the expansion, the American League added two expansion teams for the 1961 season–the Los Angeles Angels and a new Washington Senators team. However, the new Senators were (and still are) considered an expansion team since the Twins retained the old Senators' records and history. The new Senators and Angels began to fill their rosters with American League players in a chaotic, last-minute expansion draft.

=== 1961–1962: Quesada era, initial struggles ===
Cap Logo during the Quesada years.

Ownership changed hands several times during the franchise's stay in Washington and was often plagued by poor decision-making and planning. Owner Elwood Richard Quesada once wondered why he needed to pay players who did not belong in the majors and later agreed to a ten-year lease at D.C. Stadium—a move that would come back to haunt the Senators. In 1963, Quesada resigned and sold his stake in the club to Washington stockbrokers James Johnston and James Lemon.

==== 1961 ====
In the inaugural season of the Senators, under general manager Ed Doherty and manager Mickey Vernon, the team immediately struggled. The team was over .500 for only one day, with a 24–23 (.511) record on June 2, 6½ games behind the Detroit Tigers. The Senators finished the season in ninth place, with a dismal 61–100 (.379) record, and 47½ games behind the World Series winning New York Yankees. This was the only season the team played at Griffith Stadium, which closed following the conclusion of the season.

==== 1962 ====
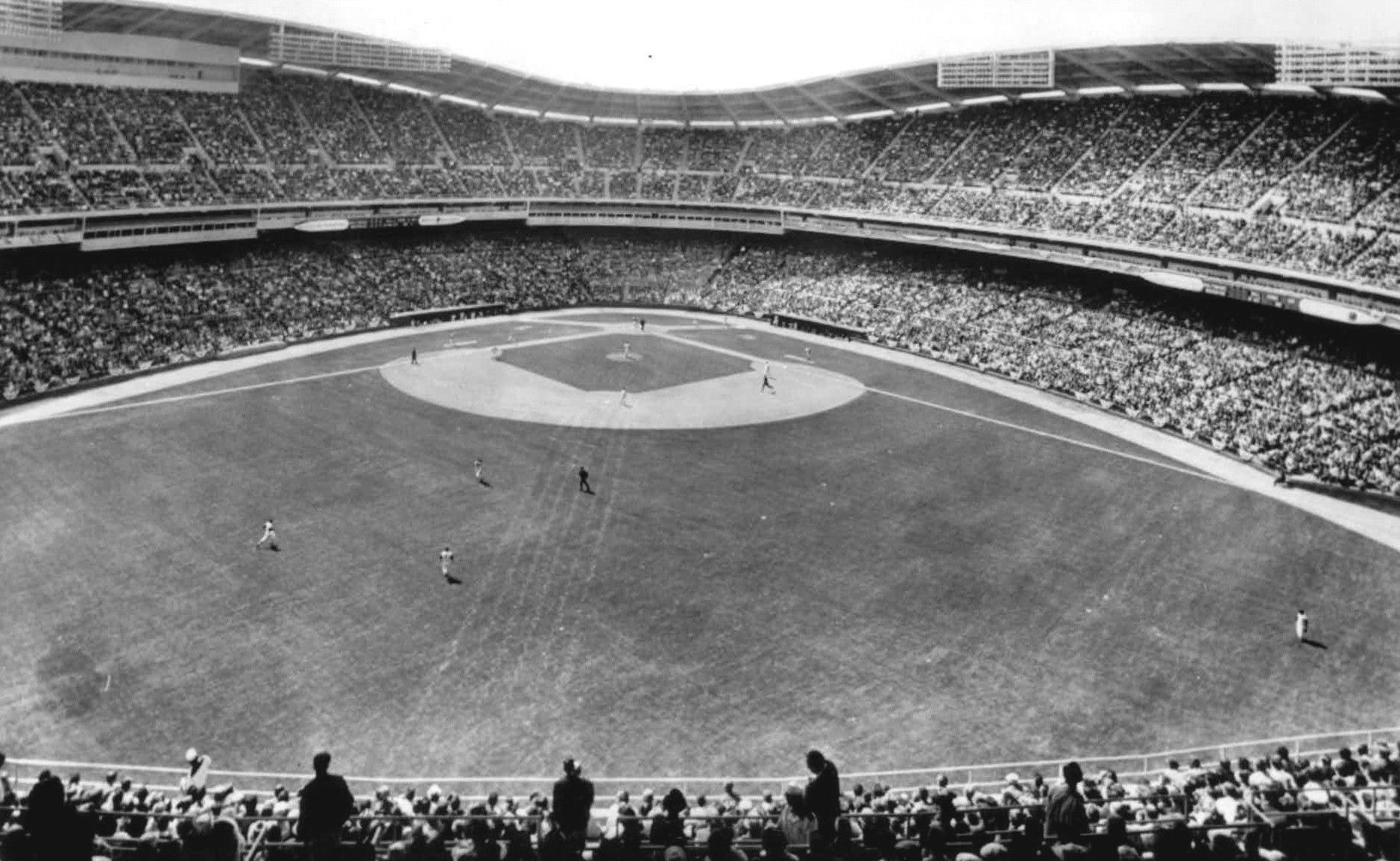
The Washington Senators played at RFK Stadium from 1962 to 1971.

In the sophomore season of the Senators, the team performed worse than the previous year. The team was in last place from game 7 on April 21 through the end of the season. The Senators ended the season with a dismal 60–101 (.373) record, 35½ games behind the World Series winning New York Yankees. The Senators played in the brand-new District of Columbia Stadium.

=== 1963–1968: Johnston & Lemon era, struggles continue ===
Cap Logo during the Johnston years (1963–1967).

What turned out to be the longest ownership era of the Washington Senators was through Washington stockbrokers James Johnston and James Lemon, having bought the team from Elwood Richard Quesada. Over the course of six seasons, both suffered massive financial losses. Johnston died in 1967 and Lemon sold the team a year later to hotel and trucking executive Bob Short, who outbid a group headed by Bob Hope.

==== 1963: Worst season in franchise history ====
The 1963 season saw a total overhaul of the team's leadership. Owner Elwood Richard Quesada sold his stake in the team, leaving James Johnston and James Lemon as new owners. The season also saw new general manager George Selkirk. and new manager Eddie Yost. Though the season did not start as bad as the previous season, from May 18 through the end of the season, the team was again in last place. Following the game on May 21, manager Mickey Vernon was fired. Following the firing, third base coach Eddie Yost was acting manager for one game. The next day saw Gil Hodges take over as manager. The Senators ended the season with their worst season in franchise history (including all Texas Rangers seasons), with a 56–106 (.346) record, 48½ games behind the New York Yankees.

==== 1964 ====
The 1964 season saw the Senators' best season to date, though still with an abysmal showing. For the entire season, the team mostly wavered between seventh and eighth place prior to June 19. From then on, the team was exclusively in ninth or last place. The Senators ended the season in ninth place with a 62–100 (.383) record, 42 games behind the New York Yankees.

==== 1965 ====
The 1965 season continued the trend of the Senators' having their best season to date, though the team was still well under .500. This was the first season the team had fewer than 100 loses. Prior to July, the team was mostly in ninth place, while from July 2 on, the team did not leave eighth place. The Senators ended the season with a 70–92 (.432) record, 32 games behind the formerly Washington-based team, the Minnesota Twins.

==== 1966 ====
The 1966 season continued the trend of the Senators' having their best season to date, though the team was still well under .500. Aside from June 2–4, the team spent the entire season wavering between seventh and last place. The Senators ended the season in eighth place with a 71–88 (.447) record, 25½ games behind the World Series winning Baltimore Orioles.

==== 1967 ====
The 1967 season continued the trend of the Senators' having their best season to date, though the team was still under .500. Though the team looked to be having another dismal season by the All-Star break (having been in last place for most of June), the team rose to sixth place by July 21 and stayed there for most of the remaining season. The Senators ended the season tied for sixth place with the Baltimore Orioles, with a 76–85 (.472) record, 15½ games behind the Boston Red Sox. Co-owner James Johnston died in December, leaving his control of ownership to his estate.

==== 1968 ====
The 1968 season, under new manager Jim Lemon, saw the Senators' worst season since 1964. The team slowly dropped in the standings after starting as a "first division" team, having placed in the upper half of the league team in April. From June 11 through the end of the season, the team held last place. The Senators ended the season with a 65–96 (.404) record, 37½ games behind the World Series winning Detroit Tigers. One of the few bright spots was left fielder Frank Howard leading the entire Major Leagues with 44 home runs.

=== 1969–1971: Bob Short era, temporary success and return to failure ===
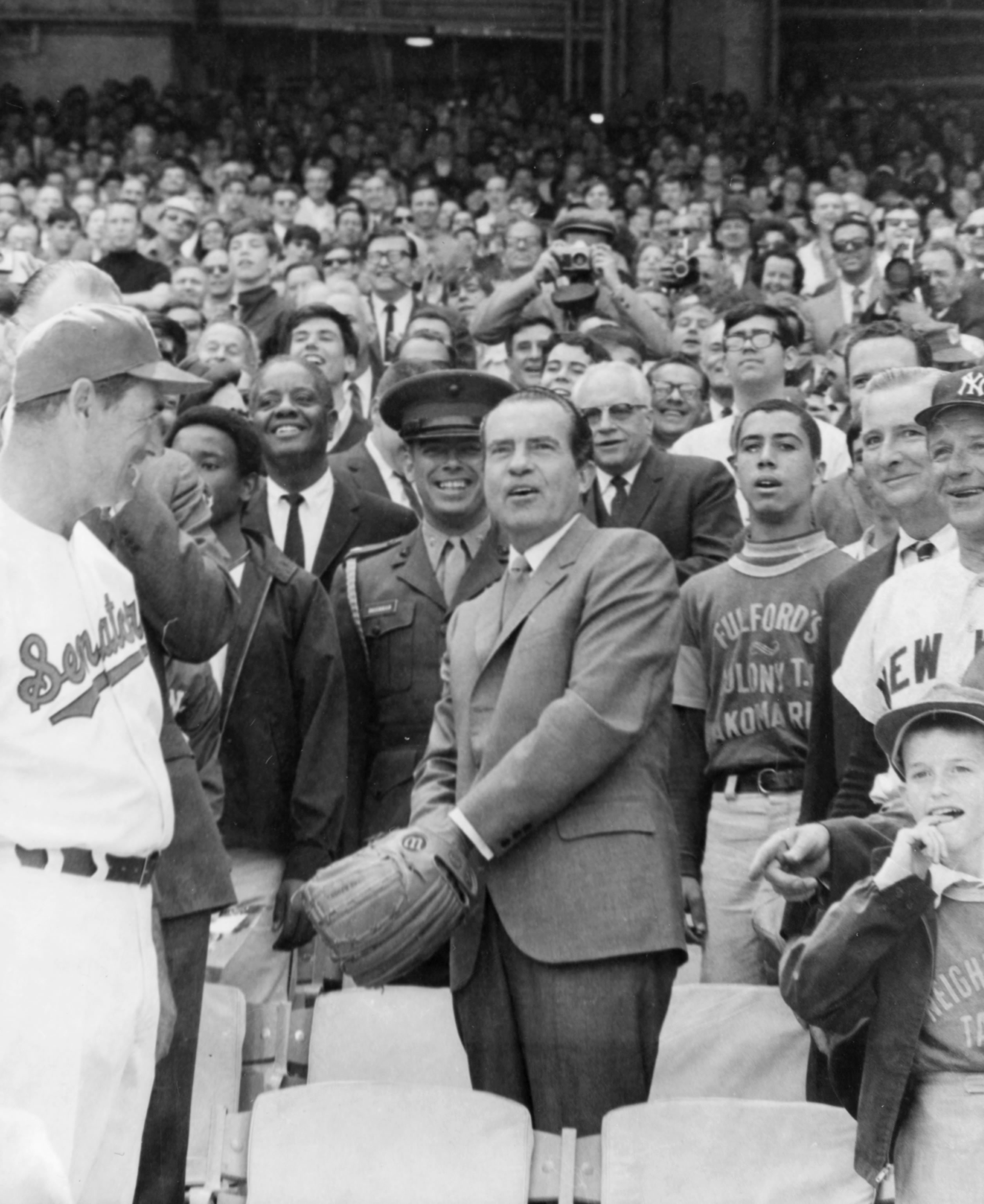
U.S. President Richard Nixon throwing the Opening Day ceremonial first pitch at RFK Stadium on April 7, 1969, with Ted Williams (left) and Bob Short (right, partially obscured by Ralph Houk)

==== 1969: Only winning season ====
The 1969 season saw the Senators be placed into the newly formed AL East, following the 1969 expansion of the American League. The season also saw a reshuffle of the team's leadership. James Lemon and the James Johnston estate sold the team to trucking executive Bob Short. Short named himself general manager and hired Hall of Famer Ted Williams as manager. Although Williams had never coached or managed at any level of baseball, he seemed to light a spark under the once-moribund Senators. After May 16, the team spent most of the season in fourth place and from May 23, were over 10 games behind. The Senators ended the season in fourth place in the AL East with an 86–76 (.531) record, 23 games behind the Baltimore Orioles. Attendance surged to over 918,000, at the time the highest in Washington baseball history.

==== 1970: Return to failure ====
Following their brief success in 1969, owner Bob Short was forced to make many questionable trades to lower the debt he had incurred to pay for the team in late 1968; the purchase price was reported at $9.4 million. Serving as his own general manager, Short was forced to make many questionable trades to service the debt and bring in much-needed revenue. As a result, the team rapidly fell back into the American League's cellar. Moreover, like their predecessors in their final few years in the nation's capital, the new Senators had to compete for an audience with the Baltimore Orioles, 45 miles (72 km) to the northeast, who by the 1960s were perennial contenders. The rise of the Orioles to regular championship contenders (winning their first World Series in 1966) did not help the Senators' cause either. Fans kept their distance from the Senators while the Orioles won four American League pennants and two World Series from 1966 through 1971.

The 1970 season for the Senators was a return to failure the team traditionally had. While competitive in April, the team fell to 10 games back by June. From June 6 on, the team was consistently in fifth and last place for the rest of the season. The Senators ended the season in last place in the AL East with a 70–92 (.432) record, 38 games behind the World Series winning Baltimore Orioles.

==== 1971: Bob Short's ultimatum ====
By the end of the 1970 campaign, Short had issued an ultimatum: unless someone was willing to buy the Senators for $12 million (by comparison, the New York Yankees were sold in 1973 for $8.8 million), he would not renew the stadium lease and would move the team elsewhere. At that season's end, Short dealt his best starting pitcher and the left side of his infield to the Detroit Tigers for erstwhile 30-game-winner Denny McLain, who had spent most of the 1970 campaign suspended because of gambling allegations. The deal—alleged by onetime Senators broadcaster Shelby Whitfield to have been made in order to secure the Tigers' vote in favor of the Senators' eventual move to Texas—turned Detroit back into contenders, while McLain was a monumental bust, losing a league-worst 22 games.

The 1971 season continued the Senators' downward trend that followed their 1969 season. While the team was once again competitive in April, the team fell to fifth place by May 9, and would waver between fifth and last place for the rest of the season. Though the team finished with a worse record than the previous year, the team ended the season in fifth place, ahead of the Cleveland Indians, in the AL East with a 63–96 (.396) record, 38½ games behind the Baltimore Orioles.

=== Relocation to Arlington, Texas ===
At first, it looked like a move to Buffalo, New York, was in the works as at the time, a proposed multi-use stadium was in the cards in either downtown Buffalo where the current KeyBank Center is, or in suburban Lancaster to share with the Buffalo Bills; however, the project went over budget and the Senators started to look elsewhere while the Bills opened up Rich Stadium instead. Short was especially receptive to an offer brought up by Arlington, Texas, mayor Tom Vandergriff, who had been trying to obtain a major league sports team to play in the Metroplex for over a decade. Years earlier, Charles O. Finley, the owner of the Kansas City Athletics, sought to relocate his baseball team to Dallas, but the idea was rebuffed and ultimately declined by the other AL team owners (the A's ultimately moved to Oakland, California in 1968). Arlington's hole card was Turnpike Stadium, a 10,000-seat park built in 1965 to house the Double-A Dallas–Fort Worth Spurs of the Texas League. However, it had been built to MLB specifications, and only minor excavations would be necessary to expand the park to accommodate major league crowds.

Vandergriff's offer of a multimillion-dollar down payment prompted Short to make the move to Arlington. On September 21, 1971, American League owners voted 10–2 to allow the move of the franchise to Arlington for the 1972 season. Senators fans were livid, and enmity came to a head at the club's last game in Washington on Thursday, September 30. Thousands simply walked in without paying after the security guards left early, swelling the paid attendance of 14,460 to around 25,000, while fans unfurled a "SHORT STINKS" banner. With two outs in the top of the ninth inning and the Senators leading 7–5, several hundred youths stormed the field, raiding it for souvenirs. One man grabbed first base and ran off with it. With no security in sight and only three bases, umpire crew chief Jim Honochick forfeited the game to the New York Yankees.

== Legacy ==
Following the team's departure from the nation's capital, the city went without major league baseball for 33 years. The now-Texas Rangers franchise retained the rights to the Senators name; when the relocation of the National League's Montreal Expos to Washington, D.C. in 2005 occurred, the team revived another longtime name, calling themselves the Washington Nationals as Washington D.C. is not a state and thus lacks representation in Congress. However, the Rangers allowed the Nationals to use the curly W logo that originated with the expansion Senators.

== Uniforms ==
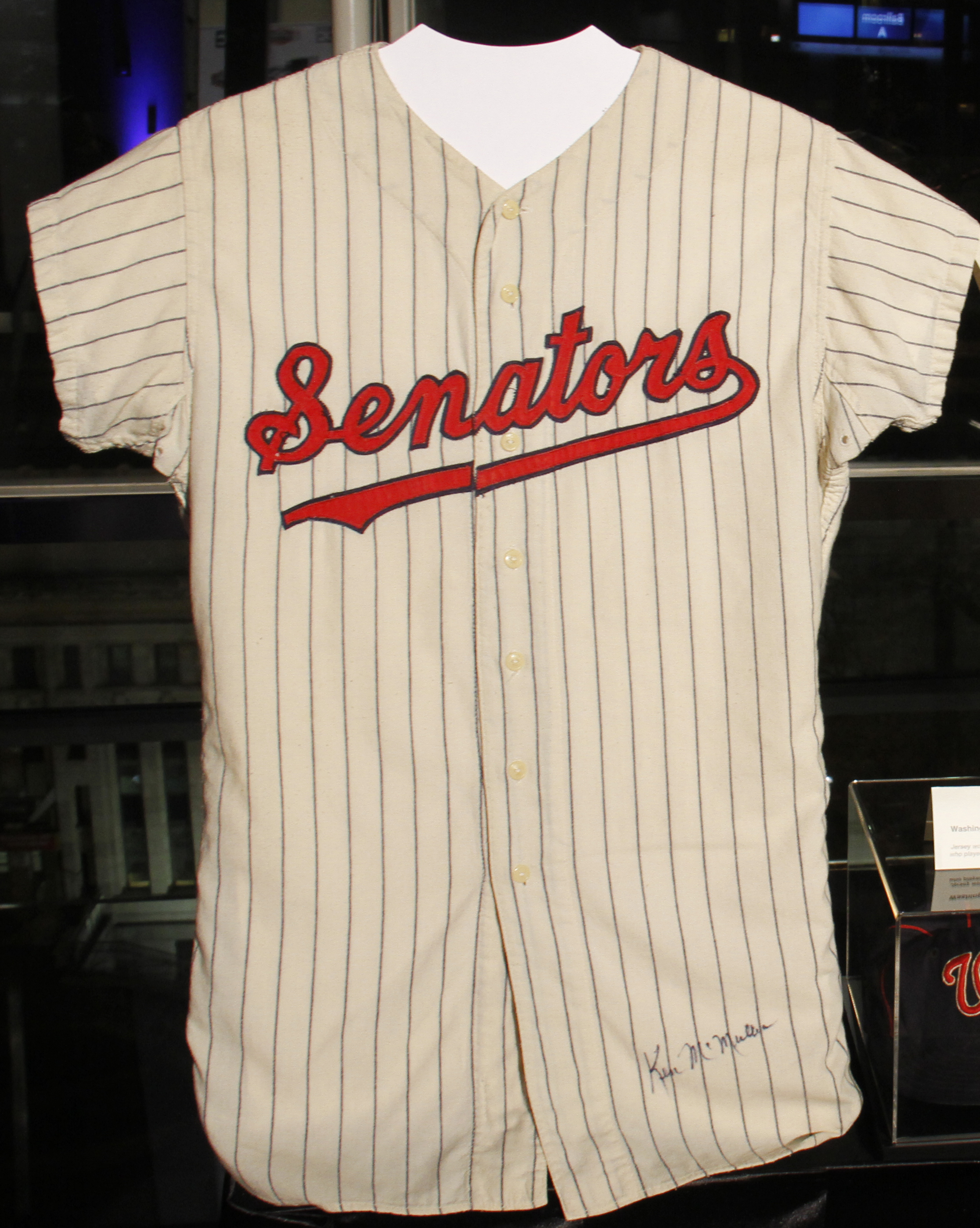
A Senators home uniform from 1963 to 1968.

As the second iteration of the Washington Senators, the team's first home uniforms featured navy pinstripes and navy-trimmed red letters. "SENATORS" was written in a style reminiscent of the Boston Red Sox's uniforms. Road gray uniforms simply featured "WASHINGTON" in navy block letters with navy numbers. Caps were all-navy with a red block "W" with white trim.

In 1963, the uniforms returned to a design similar to the final uniforms worn by the original Senators, with "Senators" in script letters and an underline tail that flowed after the second "s". However, the color scheme was reversed on the letters, with red serving as the dominant color. The cap also adopted the "curly W" insignia that was later used by the modern-day Washington Nationals. In 1968, the cap color became all-red with the "curly W" now in white with navy trim. Pinstripes would be removed from the home uniform in 1969.

== Notable Washington Senators ==
- Frank Howard, an outfielder/first baseman on the team from 1965 until after the departure to Texas, was known for his towering home runs, and is considered the team's most accomplished player, winning two home run titles in 1968 and 1970.
- Minnie Miñoso, a left fielder on the team in 1963. He played with the Senators towards the end of his career and past his prime. He was inducted into the Hall of Fame in 2022.

== Achievements ==
=== Baseball Hall of Famers ===
Washington Senators Hall of Famers
Affiliation according to the National Baseball Hall of Fame and Museum
Washington Senators

Nellie Fox

Gil Hodges

Minnie Miñoso

Ted Williams

- Players and managers listed in **bold** are depicted on their Hall of Fame plaques wearing a Senators cap insignia.

Chuck Hinton and Frank Howard, who played for the franchise in Washington (although Howard played for the Rangers in 1972), are listed on the Washington Hall of Stars display at Nationals Park in Washington. So are Gil Hodges and Mickey Vernon, who managed the "New Senators". Vernon also played for the "Old Senators", who became the Minnesota Twins.

=== Texas Rangers Hall of Fame ===
The Texas Rangers Hall of Fame was created in 2003 to honor the careers of former Texas Rangers players, managers, executives, and broadcasters. There are currently 2 members which were on the team while in Washington as the Washington Senators.

**Texas Rangers Hall of Fame**
Year	No.	Name	Position(s)	Tenure
2009	11, 17	Toby Harrah	3B/SS	1969, 1971
2010	4, 6	Tom Grieve	OF	1970

== Season-by-season records ==
Washington Senators season-by-season record
Season	Wins	Losses	Win %	Place	Playoffs
1961	61	100	.379	9th in AL	—
1962	60	101	.373	10th in AL	—
1963	56	106	.346	10th in AL	—
1964	62	100	.383	9th in AL	—
1965	70	92	.432	8th in AL	—
1966	71	88	.447	8th in AL	—
1967	76	85	.472	6th in AL	—
1968	65	96	.404	10th in AL	—
1969	86	76	.531	4th in AL East	—
1970	70	92	.432	6th in AL East	—
1971	63	96	.396	5th in AL East	—
All-Time Record	740	1,032	.418	—	—

== See also ==
- List of Minnesota Twins seasons - includes seasons of the previous MLB team named the Washington Senators
- List of Texas Rangers seasons - includes seasons of this team after their relocation to Texas
