= Bob R. Simpson =

American businessman

- Born: Texas, U.S.
- Education: Baylor University
- Occupations: Business executive Major League Baseball owner

Bob R. Simpson is an American businessman. He is the co-founder of XTO Energy and co-chairman of the Texas Rangers Major League Baseball (MLB) team.

== Career ==
In 1985, Simpson founded Cross Timbers Oil Company and has served as Chairman of the Board since July 1, 1996. In 2001, the name of the company was changed to XTO Energy. In 2009 XTO Energy was ranked 325th on the Forbes Global 2000. In December 2009, ExxonMobil announced a proposal to acquire XTO Energy for $41 billion. The merger was completed in June 2010.

== Baseball owner ==
In August 2010, Simpson and another Texas oil magnate, Ray Davis, served as co-lead investors in the $593 million winning bid to take the Texas Rangers baseball team out of bankruptcy. Simpson and Davis became co-chairmen of the Rangers, but initially remained in the background, leaving the Rangers in the hands of managing partner and CEO Chuck Greenberg and President Nolan Ryan. They served mainly as senior consultants, an arrangement continued after Greenberg resigned in 2011, making Ryan the undisputed day-to-day head of the franchise.

In October 2010, the Texas Rangers played in the World Series for the first time in franchise history, but lost the series to the San Francisco Giants. In October 2011, the team again reached the World Series, but lost again, this time to the St. Louis Cardinals. Ryan left the ownership group in 2013. However, Davis and Simpson mostly left the Rangers in the hands of general manager Jon Daniels and have rarely interfered. As before, they served mostly as senior consultants. This continued when Daniels was succeeded by Chris Young.

== Education ==
Simpson received a BS in accounting and an MBA from Baylor University. He was awarded the Distinguished Alumni Award in 2010.

== RayLynn Records ==
In 2012, Simpson, along with his wife Janice, started a record label for emerging musicians named RayLynn Records. Hear Me, the debut album from rock musician Kyle Sherman, was the first recording produced by the company.

== Numismatics ==
Simpson is an avid coin collector, and has amassed a collection of rarities. In 2020, part of his collection was auctioned off, including an 1894-S dime (one of nine known to exist). In 2026, Bob R. Simpson's 1879 $20 Liberty Head Quintuple Stella graded PCGS PR64+ was sold at Heritage Auctions for $2,562,000.
