= James Lemon =

American investment banker

James H. Lemon Sr.
- Born: James Hanson Lemon; May 14, 1903; Washington, D.C., U.S.
- Died: July 20, 1977 (aged 74); Washington, D.C., U.S.
- Education: Princeton University (B.S. 1925)
- Occupations: businessman, investment banker
- Known for: Co-owner/president of the Washington Senators (1963–1967), chairman of the board, 1968
- Spouse: Martha Lane McGchee
- Children: James Hanson Lemon Jr.

James Hanson Lemon Sr. (May 14, 1903 – July 20, 1977) was an American investment banker from Washington, D.C. He is best known as the co-owner of the Washington Senators of the American League with James Johnston from 1963 through 1967, and the principal owner and chairman of the board in 1968. Lemon was born in Washington in 1903. He received a Bachelor of Science degree from Princeton University in 1925.

During the 1930s, Lemon was well known in the world of contract bridge, serving as president of the Washington Bridge League and, in 1939, of the American Contract Bridge League (ACBL).

In 1963, Johnston and Lemon purchased the two-year-old Senators expansion franchise from their original principal owner, Elwood "Pete" Quesada. One year after Johnston's death in December 1967, Lemon sold the franchise to Bob Short. Lemon remained with the Senators as chairman of the board, retaining a minority interest in the team. Short later moved the Senators to Arlington, Texas, where they became the Texas Rangers. He was a frequent golf partner of Dwight Eisenhower, who appointed him as a special ambassador to Ghana.

Lemon was not related to Jim Lemon, the former outfielder who was field manager on the Senators in 1968.

Lemon died in 1977 at Washington at 74. His wife Martha died on December 21, 1996.
