= James Johnston (baseball owner) =

Co-owner of the Washington Senators of the American League

James M. Johnston
- Born: James Martin Johnston; December 8, 1895; Chapel Hill, North Carolina, U.S.
- Died: December 28, 1967 (aged 72); Washington, D.C., U.S.
- Education: University of North Carolina; University of Illinois
- Occupations: Businessman, investment banker
- Known for: Owner/president of the Washington Senators (1963–1967)

James Martin Johnston (December 8, 1895 – December 28, 1967) was the co-owner of the Washington Senators of the American League with James Lemon from 1963 until his death in 1967. In 1963, Johnston and Lemon purchased the franchise from Elwood Richard Quesada. His estate and James Lemon sold the team to a group of Minnesota buyers in 1968.

Johnston, who attended UNC Chapel Hill from 1913 to 1915, posthumously set up one of the university's largest need-based scholarship funds, now known as the James M. Johnston Trust for Charitable and Educational Purposes.

Johnston died in 1967 in Washington of cancer.
