= Jim Honochick =

American baseball umpire (1917-1994)

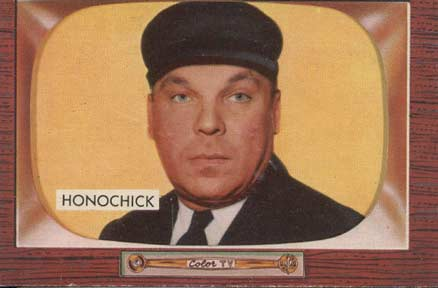
- Honochick in 1955
- Born: August 19, 1917; Oneida, Pennsylvania, U.S.
- Died: March 10, 1994 (aged 76); Allentown, Pennsylvania, U.S.
- Occupation: American League Umpire
- Years active: 1949 – 1973
- Employer: American League
- Height: 6 ft 1 in (185 cm)

George James John Honochick (August 19, 1917 – March 10, 1994) was an American professional baseball umpire, whose career in Major League Baseball (MLB) began in 1949 and ended in 1973. During that span, Honochick officiated in six World Series and four All-Star games. He also called balls and strikes for three no-hitters: the first of Virgil Trucks' two (1952), Jack Kralick (1962), and Sonny Siebert (1966).

== Early life and education ==
Honochick was Born in Oneida, Pennsylvania, on August 19, 1917. He was raised in Allentown, Pennsylvania, and graduated from West Hazleton High School in West Hazleton, Pennsylvania. He played football and baseball at Temple University in Philadelphia and minor league baseball for three seasons in the International League with the Baltimore Orioles. Honochick was an umpire in the IL prior to his promotion to the majors in March 1949.

== Career ==
Honochick was the crew chief who declared that the Washington Senators forfeit its last game in 1971, played at home at RFK Stadium in Washington, D.C. on September 30) because a mob, furious that the franchise was relocating to the Dallas–Fort Worth metroplex the next season, stormed the playing field with the team only one out away from victory. He was the only MLB umpire to travel with the Baltimore Orioles on its tour of Japan later that year in October and November.

During the mid-1970s, Honochick was one of the many professional sports-related celebrities who became spokespeople for Lite Beer from Miller. His first commercial played up the clichéd notion, usually bellowed out by hecklers, that umpires should get glasses because of questionable calls made on the field having been caused by poor eyesight. In it, he helped to promote the product without realizing who the other pitchman in the ad was. After putting on spectacles, he immediately noticed who it was, exclaiming, "Hey! You're Boog Powell!" This theme continued to be used in subsequent Miller Lite spots.
