= Elwood Richard Quesada =

United States Air Force general (1904–1993)

Elwood Richard Quesada CB CBE
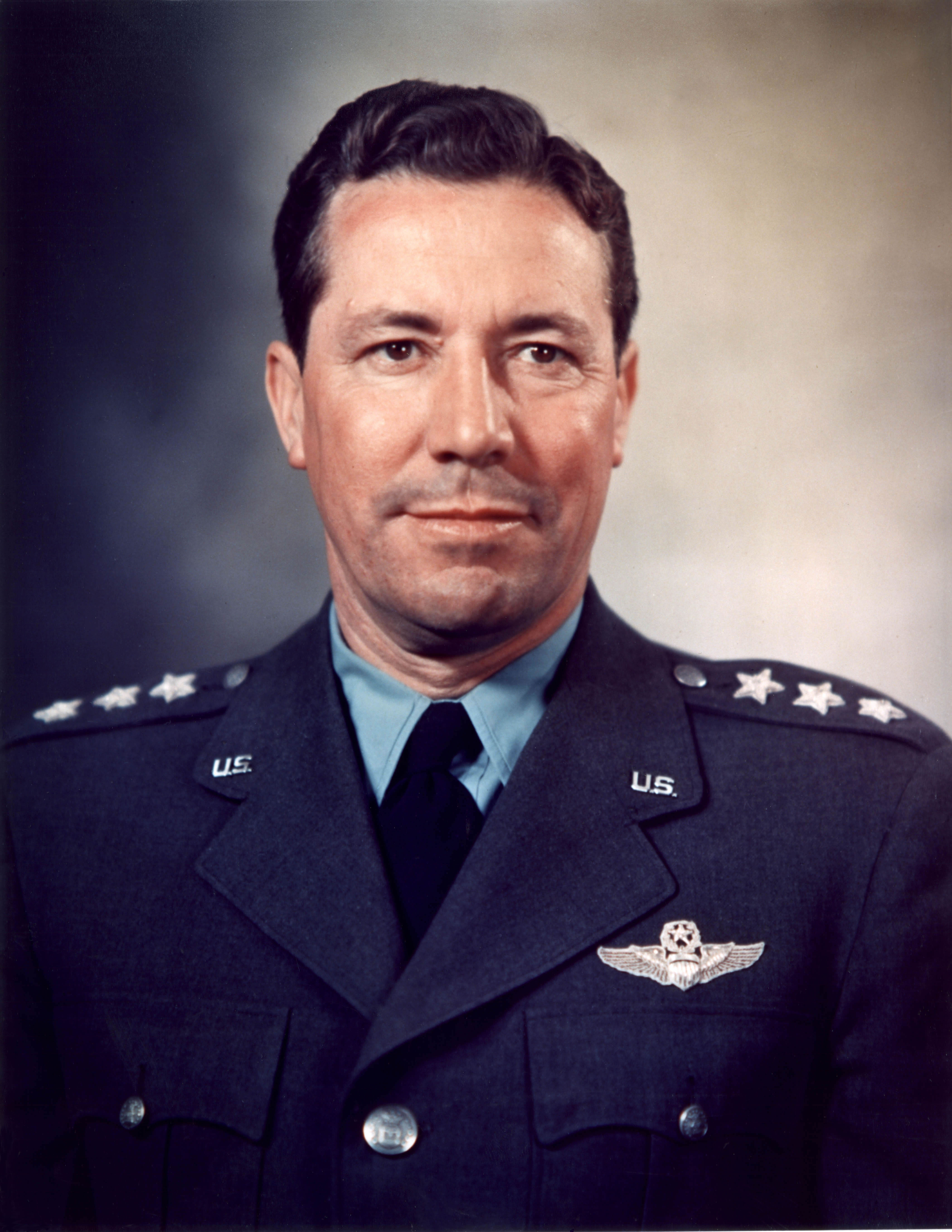
- Lt Gen. Elwood R. Quesada
- Born: April 13, 1904; Washington, D.C., US
- Died: February 9, 1993 (aged 88); Jupiter, Florida, US
- Burial place: Arlington National Cemetery
- Military career
- Allegiance: United States
- Branch: United States Army Air Corps; United States Air Force
- Service years: 1924–1951
- Rank: Lieutenant General
- Nickname: "Pete"
- Unit: Joint Chiefs of Staff
- Commands: Tactical Air Command; IX Tactical Air Command; IX Fighter Command
- Conflicts: World War II
- Awards: Distinguished Service Medal (2); Distinguished Flying Cross; Purple Heart; Air Medal (11)
- Other work: Lockheed; Administrator of the FAA; MLB owner

Elwood Richard Quesada, CB, CBE (April 13, 1904 – February 9, 1993), nicknamed "Pete", was a United States Air Force lieutenant general, FAA administrator, and, later, a club owner in Major League Baseball.

== Early years ==
Elwood Richard Quesada was born in Washington, D.C., in 1904 to an Irish-American mother and a Spanish father. He attended Wyoming Seminary in Kingston, Pa., University of Maryland, College Park, and Georgetown University.

== Early military career ==
In September 1924, Quesada enlisted in the U.S. Army Air Corps as a flying cadet and was commissioned as a reserve officer a year later. He had a wide variety of assignments as aide to senior officers, military attaché and technical adviser to other air forces, and in intelligence. He was also part of the team (with Ira Eaker and Carl Spaatz) that developed and demonstrated air-to-air refueling in 1929 on the Question Mark. All five crew members were awarded the Distinguished Flying Cross for their participation in the mission.

== Tactical airpower pioneer ==
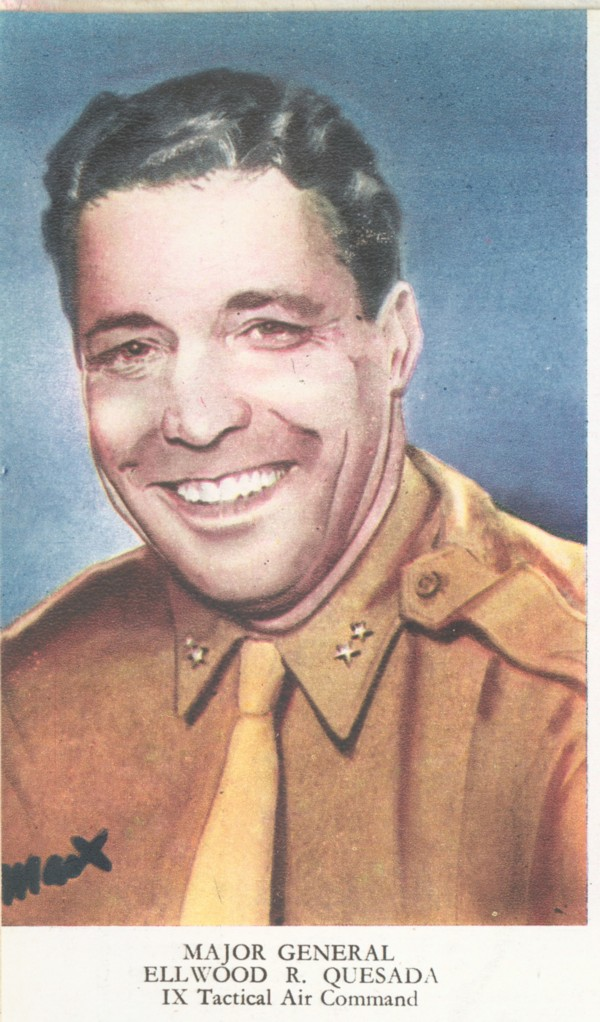
Watercolor portrait of Major General Ellwood R. Quesada, 9th Air Force, United States Army Air Force 1945

As a junior officer, Quesada became interested in the concept of close air support of ground forces, which was thoroughly developed by the 9th AF during his time as commander in North Africa and Europe.

Quesada was instrumental in developing many of the principles of tactical air-ground warfare for the Ninth Air Force during the European campaign. Innovations attributed to him included adapting a microwave early warning radar (MEW) for real-time direction of fighter bombers that were already in-flight, as well as placing pilots as forward air controllers inside tanks equipped with VHF aircraft radios on the front lines. This latter technique allowed for direct ground communication with overhead fighter-bombers by personnel who understood what pilots needed to identify ground targets. Besides reducing friendly fire incidents, such tactics allowed attacking ground troops to use close air support with greater precision and speed, allowing for air cover to take the place of artillery support in a rapid armored advance. These improved tactics enormously expanded the contributions of tactical airpower to the Allied defeat of Germany on the Western Front.

== Postwar difficulties ==
In 1946, Quesada was appointed as the first commander of the Tactical Air Command (TAC) and later promoted to lieutenant general in the newly independent U.S. Air Force. However, Quesada quickly became disillusioned as he saw how TAC was being ignored while funding and promotions were largely going to the Strategic Air Command.

In December 1948, Air Force Chief of Staff Hoyt Vandenberg stripped TAC of its planes and pilots and reduced its status to that of a planning headquarters under the newly formed Continental Air Command. Strategic airpower advocates such as General Curtis LeMay gained a lock on the budget for the Air Force in the post-World War II years, and the Air Force's tactical air warfare ability suffered.

Quesada thus asked for reassignment and was given a dead-end job by Vandenberg as head of a committee to find ways to combine the Air Force Reserve and Air National Guard. Quesada was removed from this job after only two months, as his blunt and impatient nature only served to stir up controversy in this near-impossible task. A subsequent heated exchange during a meeting with Vandenberg and LeMay regarding the slow progress of the committee only added to Quesada's difficulties. These episodes led to his request for early retirement from the Air Force, at the age of 47 in 1951.

The onset of the Korean War resulted in the re-formation of TAC, headed by Quesada's friend, General Otto P. Weyland, who led the XIX TAC during World War II. To Quesada's dismay, Vandenberg and LeMay credited Weyland for “restoring both the morale and professionalism of TAC”. Weyland gratefully accepted this praise, further infuriating Quesada.

== Civilian and family life ==
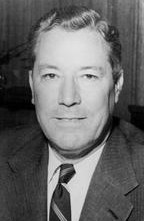
Quesada in 1961

On October 12, 1946, Quesada married Kate Davis Putnam, a war widow (her first husband was Capt. Henry Ware Putnam, who died in an air raid over Tokyo on May 25, 1945). She was a granddaughter of newspaper mogul Joseph Pulitzer, and inherited part of his holdings. Mrs. Quesada had two daughters from her previous marriage; the Quesadas had two sons of their own: Thomas Ricardo Quesada and Peter Wickham Quesada.

He served as an executive for Lockheed Aircraft Corporation from 1953–55. In 1957, he became President Dwight D. Eisenhower's Special Adviser for Aviation, leading to his appointment as the first administrator of the Federal Aviation Administration (At that time a cabinet level agency known as the Federal Aviation Agency-FAA) from 1959–61.

As FAA chairman, Quesada was instrumental, along with American Airlines president C. R. Smith, in passing a mandatory retirement age of 60 for commercial airline pilots. Smith had lobbied for this rule on the grounds that young pilots with experience serving in World War II and the Korean War would be cheap and easy to train for the new jetliners. Quesada agreed, but went even further to suggest that civilian pilots be barred entirely from jetliner cockpits. The age 60 rule went into effect in 1960 and remained in effect until 2007, although Quesada's proposal to limit jetliners to ex-military personnel was ignored along with an additional suggestion of his that jetliner training be limited to pilots under 55.

C.R. Smith rewarded Quesada handsomely for his help; after the latter stepped down as FAA chairman in 1961, he was granted a seat on American Airlines' board of directors.

Quesada became involved in professional sports when he became owner of the expansion Washington Senators in 1961. Quesada sold his stake in the team two years later. He later became President and Chief Executive Officer of the L'Enfant Plaza Corporation, a private corporation that successfully partnered with the Federal government to develop L'Enfant Plaza. He later became a member of the Temporary Commission on Pennsylvania Avenue, a precursor of the Pennsylvania Avenue Development Corporation, which helped redevelop Pennsylvania Avenue NW between the White House and the United States Capitol.

In 1962 Quesada was a member of a fundraising committee organized by the Cuban Families Committee for Liberation of Prisoners of War, which sought to raise money to pay the ransom set by Fidel Castro for the release of those taken captive as a result of the Bay of Pigs Invasion.

Quesada, his wife, and their two sons were involved in a dispute with Joseph Pulitzer III in 1986 over the control and value of the sons' shares in the St. Louis Post-Dispatch.

== Death ==
General Quesada died on February 9, 1993, at a Jupiter, Florida, hospital and was buried at Arlington National Cemetery, in Arlington, Virginia. His wife Kate Davis Putnam Quesada died March 5, 2003, and was interred with him at Arlington National Cemetery.

== Recognitions, decorations and medals ==
=== American decorations and medals ===
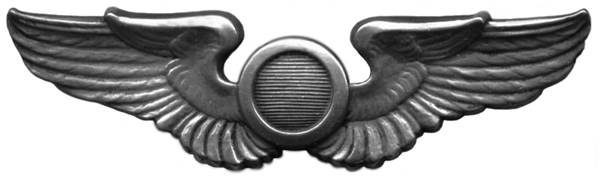
United States Air Force Command Pilot Badge
USAAF Observer Badge

Army Distinguished Service Medal with bronze oak leaf cluster
Distinguished Flying Cross
Purple Heart
Air Medal with two silver oak leaf clusters
American Defense Service Medal
American Campaign Medal
European-African-Middle Eastern Campaign Medal with one silver and two bronze campaign stars
World War II Victory Medal
National Defense Service Medal
Air Force Longevity Service Award with silver oak leaf cluster

=== Foreign orders and medals ===
Order of the Bath (Degree of Companion)
Commander of the Order of the British Empire
French Legion of Honor (Chevalier)
French Croix de Guerre with Palm
Luxembourg Croix de Guerre
Order of Adolphe of Nassau
l'Ordre de la Couronne with Palm
Croix d'Officier de l'Order de la Couronne with Palm

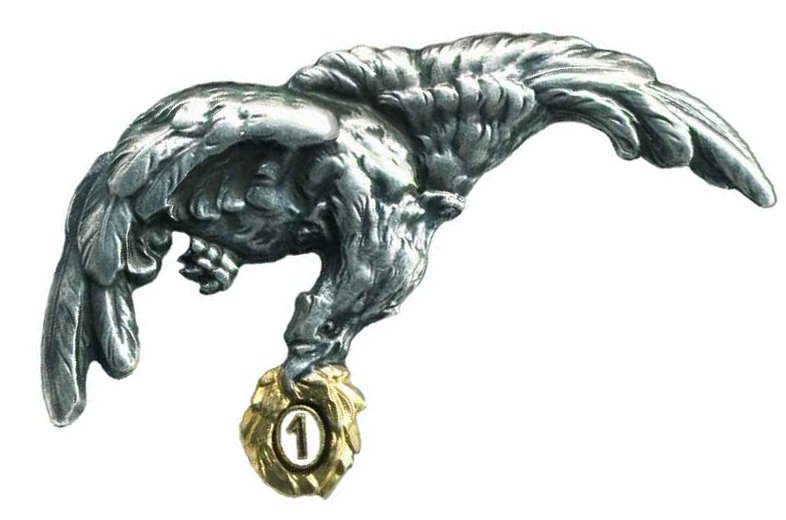
Polish Pilot Badge

=== Other honors ===
The Arnold Air Society Squadron at Clarkson University is named in his honor.

On September 14, 2011, he was honored posthumously during Hispanic Heritage Month activities in Cleveland, Ohio.

In 2012 Quesada was posthumously inducted into the National Aviation Hall of Fame in Dayton, Ohio.

== Rank and promotions ==
Lieutenant General Quesada was promoted and held commands as follows:

- Second Lieutenant – 14 September 1925
- First Lieutenant – 1 November 1932
- Captain – 20 April 1935
- Major – 1 February 1941; 3rd Pursuit Group
- Lieutenant Colonel – 5 January 1942; Philadelphia Region, I Fighter Command
- Brigadier General – 11 December 1942; 1st Air Defense Wing; XII Fighter Command; IX Fighter Command; IX Tactical Air Command
- Major General – 28 April 1944; Ninth Air Force
- Lieutenant General – 1 October 1947; Tactical Air Command

== See also ==
- Hispanic Americans in World War II
- Hispanics in the United States Air Force

Government offices
Preceded by —	Administrator of the Federal Aviation Administration; 1958–1961	Succeeded by Najeeb Halaby
