= 1978 Texas Rangers season =

1978 Texas Rangers
- League: American League
- Division: West
- Ballpark: Arlington Stadium
- City: Arlington, Texas
- Record: 87–75 (.537)
- Divisional place: 2nd
- Owners: Bradford G. Corbett
- General managers: Dan O'Brien Sr. / Eddie Robinson
- Managers: Billy Hunter, Pat Corrales
- Television: KXAS-TV (Jon Miller, Frank Glieber)
- Radio: WBAP (Jon Miller, Bill Merrill)

The 1978 Texas Rangers season was the 18th of the Texas Rangers franchise overall, their 7th in Arlington as the Rangers, and the 7th season at Arlington Stadium. The Rangers finished second in the American League West with a record of 87 wins and 75 losses.

== Offseason ==
- October 25, 1977: Gorman Thomas was sent to the Rangers by the Milwaukee Brewers to complete an earlier deal (the Brewers sent a player to be named later to the Rangers for Ed Kirkpatrick) made on August 20.
- November 9, 1977: Mike Marshall was granted free agency. Richie Zisk signed a 10-year, $2.75 million contract as a free agent.
- November 10, 1977: Darold Knowles was purchased from the Rangers by the Montreal Expos.
- November 11, 1977: Doc Medich signed as a free agent.
- December 8, 1977: Bert Blyleven was traded by the Rangers to the Pittsburgh Pirates, Adrian Devine, Tommy Boggs, and Eddie Miller, were traded by the Rangers to the Atlanta Braves, and Tom Grieve and a player to be named later were traded by the Rangers to the New York Mets as part of a 4-team trade. Al Oliver and Nelson Norman were traded by the Pirates to the Rangers, and Jon Matlack was traded by the Mets to the Rangers. John Milner was traded by the Mets to the Pirates. Willie Montañez was traded by the Braves to the Mets. The Rangers completed the deal by sending Ken Henderson to the Mets on March 15, 1978.
- December 14, 1977: Ferguson Jenkins was traded by the Boston Red Sox to the Rangers for John Poloni and cash.
- January 21, 1978: Mike Jorgensen signed as a free agent.
- January 25, 1978: Gaylord Perry was traded by the Rangers to the San Diego Padres for Dave Tomlin and $125,000.
- February 8, 1978: Gorman Thomas was sold back to the Milwaukee Brewers.
- February 28, 1978: David Clyde and Willie Horton were traded by the Rangers to the Cleveland Indians for Tom Buskey and John Lowenstein.
- March 1, 1978: Jackie Brown and Rusty Torres were signed as free agents.
- March 28, 1978: Mark Mercer signed as a free agent. Dave Tomlin was sold to the Cincinnati Reds.
- April 1, 1978: Tom Buskey was released as a free agent.
- April 2, 1978: Jim Hughes signed as a free agent.

== Regular season ==
=== Season standings ===
AL West
Team	W	L	Pct.	GB	Home	Road
Kansas City Royals	92	70	.568	—	56‍–‍25	36‍–‍45
Texas Rangers	87	75	.537	5	52‍–‍30	35‍–‍45
California Angels	87	75	.537	5	50‍–‍31	37‍–‍44
Minnesota Twins	73	89	.451	19	38‍–‍43	35‍–‍46
Chicago White Sox	71	90	.441	20½	38‍–‍42	33‍–‍48
Oakland Athletics	69	93	.426	23	38‍–‍42	31‍–‍51
Seattle Mariners	56	104	.350	35	32‍–‍49	24‍–‍55

=== Record vs. opponents ===
1978 American League record Sources:
Team	BAL	BOS	CAL	CWS	CLE	DET	KC	MIL	MIN	NYY	OAK	SEA	TEX	TOR
Baltimore	—	7–8	4–6	8–1	9–6	7–8	2–8	7–8	5–5	6–9	11–0	9–1	7–4	8–7
Boston	8–7	—	9–2	7–3	7–8	12–3	4–6	10–5	9–2	7–9	5–5	7–3	3–7	11–4
California	6–4	2–9	—	8–7	6–4	4–7	9–6	5–5	12–3	5–5	9–6	9–6	5–10	7–3
Chicago	1–8	3–7	7–8	—	8–2	2–9	8–7	4–7	8–7	1–9	7–8	7–8	11–4	4–6
Cleveland	6–9	8–7	4–6	2–8	—	5–10	5–6	5–10	5–5	6–9	4–6	8–1	1–9	10–4
Detroit	8–7	3–12	7–4	9–2	10–5	—	4–6	7–8	4–6	4–11	6–4	8–2	7–3	9–6
Kansas City	8–2	6–4	6–9	7–8	6–5	6–4	—	6–4	7–8	6–5	10–5	12–3	7–8	5–5
Milwaukee	8–7	5–10	5–5	7–4	10–5	8–7	4–6	—	4–7	10–5	9–1	5–5	6–4	12–3
Minnesota	5–5	2–9	3–12	7–8	5–5	6–4	8–7	7–4	—	3–7	9–6	6–9	6–9	6–4
New York	9–6	9–7	5–5	9–1	9–6	11–4	5–6	5–10	7–3	—	8–2	6–5	6–4	11–4
Oakland	0–11	5–5	6–9	8–7	6–4	4–6	5–10	1–9	6–9	2–8	—	13–2	6–9	7–4
Seattle	1–9	3–7	6–9	8–7	1–8	2–8	3–12	5–5	9–6	5–6	2–13	—	3–12	8–2
Texas	4–7	7–3	10–5	4–11	9–1	3–7	8–7	4–6	9–6	4–6	9–6	12–3	—	4–7
Toronto	7–8	4–11	3–7	6–4	4–10	6–9	5–5	3–12	4–6	4–11	4–7	2–8	7–4	—

=== Notable transactions ===
- April 18, 1978: Reggie Cleveland was purchased from the Boston Red Sox.
- May 16, 1978: Bobby Bonds was traded to the Rangers by the Chicago White Sox for Claudell Washington and Rusty Torres.
- May 17, 1978: Dave May was sold to the Milwaukee Brewers.
- June 6, 1978: 1978 Major League Baseball draft
  - Wayne Tolleson was drafted by the Rangers in the 8th round.
  - Charlie O'Brien was drafted by the Rangers in the 14th round, but did not sign.
  - Mike Richardt was drafted by the Rangers in the 1st round (10th pick) of the Secondary Phase.
- August 1, 1978: Paul Lindblad was sold to the New York Yankees.
- August 31, 1978 Johnny Grubb was traded to the Rangers by the Cleveland Indians for players to be named later. Bobby Cuellar and Dave Rivera (minor leaguer) were sent to Cleveland on October 3 to complete the trade.

=== Roster ===
1978 Texas Rangers roster
Roster
Pitchers: 33 Doyle Alexander; 39 Len Barker; 26 Reggie Cleveland; 28 Steve Comer; 44 Danny Darwin; 17 Dock Ellis; 31 Ferguson Jenkins; 25 Paul Lindblad; 32 Jon Matlack; 42 Doc Medich; 16 Paul Mirabella; 29 Roger Moret; 40 Jim Umbarger	Catchers: 9 John Ellis; 43 Greg Mahlberg; 10 Jim Sundberg; Infielders: 2 Sandy Alomar Sr.; 13 Kurt Bevacqua; 19 Bert Campaneris; 21 Mike Hargrove; 11 Toby Harrah; 35 Mike Jorgensen; 34 John Lowenstein; 3 Jim Mason; 4 Nelson Norman; 18 Pat Putnam; 15 La Rue Washington; 1 Bump Wills	Outfielders: 12 Juan Beníquez; 24 Bobby Bonds; 6 Johnny Grubb; 0 Al Oliver; 7 Billy Sample; 20 Bobby Thompson; 15 Claudell Washington; 22 Richie Zisk; Other batters: 23 Gary Gray	Manager: 45 Pat Corrales; 5 Billy Hunter; Coaches: 45 Pat Corrales; 41 Sid Hudson; 47 Fred Koenig; 8 Connie Ryan; 40 Jimmie Schaffer

== Player stats ==
=== Batting ===
==== Starters by position ====
Note: Pos = Position; G = Games played; AB = At bats; H = Hits; Avg. = Batting average; HR = Home runs; RBI = Runs batted in

Pos	Player	G	AB	H	Avg.	HR	RBI
C	Jim Sundberg	149	518	144	.278	6	58
1B	Mike Hargrove	146	494	124	.251	7	40
2B	Bump Wills	157	539	135	.250	9	57
SS	Bert Campaneris	98	269	50	.186	1	17
3B	Toby Harrah	139	450	103	.229	12	59
LF	Al Oliver	133	525	170	.324	14	89
CF	Juan Beníquez	127	473	123	.260	11	50
RF	Bobby Bonds	130	475	126	.265	29	82
DH	Richie Zisk	140	511	134	.262	22	85

==== Other batters ====
Note: G = Games played; AB = At bats; H = Hits; Avg. = Batting average; HR = Home runs; RBI = Runs batted in

Player	G	AB	H	Avg.	HR	RBI
Kurt Bevacqua	90	248	55	.222	6	30
John Lowenstein	77	176	39	.222	5	21
Bobby Thompson	64	120	27	.225	2	12
Jim Mason	55	105	20	.190	0	3
Mike Jorgensen	96	97	19	.196	1	9
John Ellis	34	94	23	.245	3	17
Gary Gray	17	50	12	.240	2	6
Pat Putnam	20	46	7	.152	1	2
Claudell Washington	12	42	7	.167	0	2
Nelson Norman	23	34	9	.265	0	1
Johnny Grubb	12	33	13	.394	1	6
Sandy Alomar Sr.	24	29	6	.207	0	1
Billy Sample	8	15	7	.467	0	3
La Rue Washington	3	3	0	.000	0	0
Greg Mahlberg	1	1	0	.000	0	0

=== Pitching ===
==== Starting pitchers ====
Note: G = Games pitched; IP = Innings pitched; W = Wins; L = Losses; ERA = Earned run average; SO = Strikeouts

Player	G	IP	W	L	ERA	SO
Jon Matlack	35	270.0	15	13	2.27	157
Ferguson Jenkins	34	249.0	18	8	3.04	157
Doyle Alexander	31	191.0	9	10	3.86	81
Doc Medich	28	171.0	9	8	3.74	71
Doc Ellis	22	141.1	9	7	4.20	45

==== Other pitchers ====
Note: G = Games pitched; IP = Innings pitched; W = Wins; L = Losses; ERA = Earned run average; SO = Strikeouts

Player	G	IP	W	L	ERA	SO
Steve Comer	30	117.1	11	5	2.30	65
Jim Umbarger	32	97.2	5	8	4.88	60
Paul Mirabella	10	28.0	3	2	5.79	23
Roger Moret	7	14.2	0	1	4.91	5
Danny Darwin	3	8.2	1	0	4.15	8

==== Relief pitchers ====
Note: G = Games pitched; W = Wins; L = Losses; SV = Saves; ERA = Earned run average; SO = Strikeouts

Player	G	W	L	SV	ERA	SO
Reggie Cleveland	53	5	7	12	3.09	46
Len Barker	29	1	5	4	4.82	33
Paul Lindblad	18	1	1	2	3.63	25

== Awards and honors ==
- Jim Sundberg, Gold Glove, catcher

=== All-Stars ===
All-Star Game

== Farm system ==
Level	Team	League	Manager
AAA	Tucson Toros	Pacific Coast League	Rich Donnelly
AA	Tulsa Drillers	Texas League	Marty Martínez
A	Asheville Tourists	Western Carolinas League	Wayne Terwilliger
Rookie	GCL Rangers	Gulf Coast League	Joe Klein

LEAGUE CHAMPIONS: GCL Rangers
