= John Milner =

American baseball player (1949–2000)

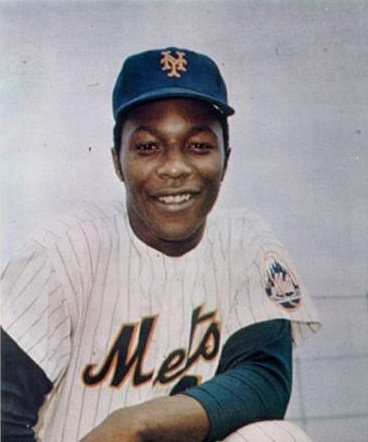
- Milner with the New York Mets in 1974
- First baseman / Left fielder
- Born: December 28, 1949; Atlanta, Georgia, U.S.
- Died: January 4, 2000 (aged 50); East Point, Georgia, U.S.
- Batted: Left Threw: Left

MLB debut
- September 15, 1971, for the New York Mets

Last MLB appearance
- October 3, 1982, for the Pittsburgh Pirates

MLB statistics
- Batting average: .249
- Home runs: 131
- Runs batted in: 498
- Stats at Baseball Reference

Teams
- New York Mets (1971–1977); Pittsburgh Pirates (1978–1981); Montreal Expos (1981–1982); Pittsburgh Pirates (1982)

Career highlights and awards
- World Series champion (1979)

John David Milner (December 28, 1949 – January 4, 2000) was an American professional baseball player. He played in Major League Baseball as a first baseman and left fielder from 1971 to 1982 for the New York Mets, Pittsburgh Pirates and the Montreal Expos. Milner was a member of the 1973 National League pennant-winning New York Mets team, as well as a member of the 1979 world champion Pittsburgh Pirates team. A native of Atlanta, Georgia, he grew up a huge Hank Aaron fan, even appropriating his idol's nickname, "the Hammer".

== New York Mets ==
Milner was drafted by the New York Mets in the 14th round of the 1968 Major League Baseball draft out of South Fulton High School in East Point, Georgia, where he was All-State in baseball, football and basketball. He batted .307 with 58 home runs and 168 runs batted in over three seasons in their farm system before making his major league debut with the Mets in September 1971. He earned the job of "left-handed bat off the bench" on the opening day roster in 1972 by batting .296 with a team high three home runs during spring training, and quickly moved into a platoon with Cleon Jones in left field. In the first game of a September 8 doubleheader with the St. Louis Cardinals, Milner became the first Mets rookie in franchise history to record a five-hit game. For the season, he batted .238 with a team high 17 home runs and 38 runs batted in to finish third in National League Rookie of the Year balloting behind teammate Jon Matlack.

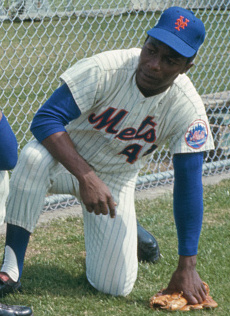
Milner in spring training with the Mets

For 1973, Milner was moved to first base. He was leading his team with a .328 batting average, five home runs and thirteen runs batted in when he suffered a hamstring injury against the Houston Astros on April 25, an injury that plagued him for the rest of his career. He returned to the club in mid-May, but went into a 12-for-82 slump that saw his batting average fall to .216. He returned to form by the end of the season to lead his team with 72 runs batted in and a career high 23 home runs as the Mets completed their improbable run to their second National League East crown.

The Mets pulled off the surprise victory over Cincinnati's "Big Red Machine" in the 1973 National League Championship Series, but lost in seven games to the Oakland Athletics in the 1973 World Series. Milner batted .250 in the post-season with three runs batted in and four runs scored. Though he was not credited with a run batted in, his at-bat in the twelfth inning of game two drove in two runs for the Mets' extra innings victory.

On September 11, 1974, Milner tied a major league record by making twelve plate appearances in the Mets' 25 inning marathon with the Cardinals. That season, he led his team in home runs for the third year in a row, with 20, and also led his team with 70 runs scored. For his career with the Mets, Milner batted .245 with 94 home runs and 338 runs batted in.

Milner was dealt from the Mets to the Pittsburgh Pirates in the first four-team blockbuster deal in Major League Baseball history on December 8, 1977. The trade also involved the Texas Rangers, Atlanta Braves, and a total of 11 players changing teams. The Pirates also acquired Bert Blyleven from the Rangers. The Mets got Willie Montañez from the Braves and Tom Grieve and Ken Henderson from the Rangers (Henderson was sent to New York to complete the transaction three months later, on March 15, 1978). The Rangers received Al Oliver and Nelson Norman from the Pirates and Jon Matlack from the Mets. Adrian Devine, Tommy Boggs, and Eddie Miller were traded from the Rangers to the Braves.

== Pittsburgh Pirates ==
Milner found himself in more of a reserve role with Pittsburgh, with the 333 at-bats he logged in 1978 being his fewest outside of his injury plagued 1975 season. His finest season with the Pirates came in 1979, when he hit 16 home runs and drove in 60 backing up Willie Stargell at first and Bill Robinson in left field. Milner was held hitless in nine at-bats in the 1979 National League Championship Series against the Cincinnati Reds, but was 3-for-9 in the World Series with a run batted in and two runs scored.

Milner developed and refined a reputation as a reliable pinch hitter who thrived in pressure situations during his tenure with the Pirates. On August 20, 1981, he was traded to the Montreal Expos for Willie Montañez, who also was part of the four-team trade in 1977. Milner reached the post-season for the third time in his career as the Expos won the second half of the strike shortened 1981 season. He was 1-for-2 in the 1981 National League Division Series against the Philadelphia Phillies with a run batted in during the fourth game. When Milner was released by the Expos midway through the 1982 season, he rejoined the Pirates. He was released by the Pirates the following spring, and retired.

== Career stats ==
Games	PA	AB	Runs	Hits	2B	3B	HR	GS	RBI	SB	BB	SO	Avg.	Slg.	OBP	OPS	Fld%
1215	3958	3436	455	855	140	16	131	10	498	31	504	473	.249	.413	.344	.757	.989

A pure fastball hitter with lightning-quick wrists, Milner posted a 1.066 walk-to-strikeout ratio (504-to-473) for his career. Milner hit 10 career grand slams, including three with the Mets in 1976.

== Pittsburgh drug trials ==
After his playing career, Milner was called to testify at the cocaine distribution trial of Curtis Strong. He stated during his testimony that he used cocaine from 1978 through 1984, and that he bought two grams of cocaine for $200 in the bathroom stalls at Three Rivers Stadium during a June 13, 1980, Pirates-Astros game, and on September 30, 1981. He also claimed to have used a liquid form of amphetamines called "red juice" he acquired from Willie Mays while both played with the Mets, and that "greenies" (also an amphetamine) were often anonymously placed in his locker while he played with the Pirates. Dale Berra and Dave Parker both attributed the greenies to Willie Stargell. Both Stargell and Mays denied the claims made against them. Berra also claimed to have shared cocaine with Milner, Parker, Lee Lacy, Lee Mazzilli, and Rod Scurry while all were members of the Pirates.

== Death ==
Milner died of cancer in East Point, Georgia, on January 4, 2000.
