= Bert Blyleven =

Dutch-American baseball player (born 1951)

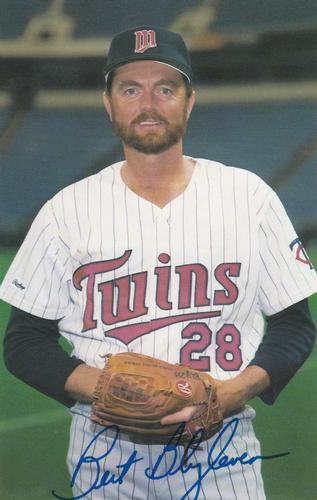
- Blyleven with the Minnesota Twins in 1987
- Pitcher
- Born: April 6, 1951 (age 75); Zeist, Netherlands
- Batted: Right Threw: Right

MLB debut
- June 5, 1970, for the Minnesota Twins

Last MLB appearance
- October 4, 1992, for the California Angels

MLB statistics
- Win–loss record: 287–250
- Earned run average: 3.31
- Strikeouts: 3,701
- Stats at Baseball Reference

Teams
- Minnesota Twins (1970–1976); Texas Rangers (1976–1977); Pittsburgh Pirates (1978–1980); Cleveland Indians (1981–1985); Minnesota Twins (1985–1988); California Angels (1989–1990, 1992)

Career highlights and awards
- 2× All-Star (1973, 1985); 2× World Series champion (1979, 1987); AL strikeout leader (1985); Pitched a no-hitter on September 22, 1977; Minnesota Twins No. 28 retired; Minnesota Twins Hall of Fame

Member of the National

Baseball Hall of Fame
- Induction: 2011
- Vote: 79.7% (14th ballot)

Rik Aalbert Blyleven (born Blijleven, April 6, 1951) is a Dutch-American former professional baseball pitcher and color commentator. He played 22 seasons in Major League Baseball (MLB) from 1970 to 1992 and from 1996 to 2020 was a color commentator for Minnesota Twins television broadcasts. Blyleven recorded 3,701 career strikeouts, the fifth-most in MLB history. He won 287 games, 27th-most all-time, and pitched 4,970 innings, 14th-most all-time. A renowned curveball pitcher, Blyleven was a two-time All-Star and World Series champion. In 2011, Blyleven was inducted into the Baseball Hall of Fame.

Blyleven made his major league debut at age 19 for the Twins. In the middle of the 1976 season, he was traded to the Texas Rangers, where he threw a no-hitter in his final start for the team. He won his first World Series with the Pittsburgh Pirates in 1979. Upon being traded to the Cleveland Indians, Blyleven initially struggled with injuries, but then enjoyed a late-career resurgence, finishing third in the Cy Young Award voting in back-to-back years, with Cleveland in 1984 and in 1985, a season split between the Indians and Twins. During his second stint with Minnesota, Blyleven became the tenth member of the 3,000-strikeout club in 1986 and won a second World Series title in 1987. He played three seasons for the California Angels before retiring.

Blyleven became the first Dutch-born player to earn induction into the Baseball Hall of Fame. He was the pitching coach for the Netherlands in several World Baseball Classic tournaments.

== Early life ==
Rik Aalbert Blyleven was born in Zeist, a town in Utrecht, Netherlands, the son of Johannes Cornelius and Jannigje Blijleven. His family moved to Melville, Saskatchewan when Blyleven was two years old before ultimately settling in Garden Grove, California in 1957 when Blyleven was five years old. One of seven children, his parents anglicized their own names to Joe and Jenny, with Rik Aalbert becoming "Bert".

Blyleven became interested in baseball as a young boy watching Sandy Koufax pitch for the Los Angeles Dodgers and listening to Vin Scully and Jerry Doggett announce the Dodgers' radio broadcasts. Blyleven later said, "My dad built me a mound in the backyard with a canvas backdrop over our horseshoe pits, and I would go back there and just throw and throw and throw until I developed it, and it became my curveball. And I could throw it over at any time, any count."

== Playing career ==
Blyleven starred on the Santiago High School baseball team in Garden Grove, also running cross country to build up his stamina and leg strength. The Minnesota Twins drafted him out of high school in the third round, with the 55th selection in the 1969 Major League Baseball draft. After just 21 minor league starts, the Twins called him up to the majors at age 19 on June 2, 1970. In his first season, his sharp curveball helped him to 10 wins, and he was named American League (AL) Rookie Pitcher of the Year by The Sporting News. In 1973, he pitched nine shutouts, the most of any AL pitcher that season.

However, Blyleven's early career with the Twins was not always pleasant, as he was hounded by critics and fans. He clashed with Twins owner Calvin Griffith over his $65,200 salary and refused to sign a contract with the team for the 1976 season. The Twins traded him along with Danny Thompson to the Texas Rangers for Roy Smalley III, Mike Cubbage, Bill Singer, and Jim Gideon on June 1, 1976. The deal was set in motion when Blyleven agreed with the Rangers on a three-year, $550,000 contract two days earlier.

Blyleven pitched well with the Rangers, posting a 2.74 ERA in fewer than two seasons. On September 22, 1977, just two weeks after being sidelined with a groin injury, Blyleven no-hit the California Angels 6–0. The no-hitter was his final start as a Ranger; not until Cole Hamels during the 2015 season would a pitcher be traded after pitching a no-hitter in his most recent start for the team that traded him. His 2.74 ERA with Texas is one of the lowest in franchise history.

Following an incident in which Blyleven blatantly gave the finger to a television camera obviously focused on him during one of the Rangers' rare nationally broadcast games, he was dealt to the Pittsburgh Pirates in the first four-team blockbuster deal in MLB history on December 8, 1977, that also involved the Atlanta Braves, New York Mets and 11 players changing teams. The Pirates also acquired John Milner from the Mets. The Rangers received Al Oliver and Nelson Norman from the Pirates and Jon Matlack from the Mets. Adrian Devine, Tommy Boggs and Eddie Miller were traded from the Rangers to the Braves. The Mets got Willie Montañez from the Braves and Tom Grieve and Ken Henderson from the Rangers. Henderson was sent to New York to complete the transaction three months later on March 15, 1978. With the Pirates, Blyleven led the team in ERA, strikeouts, and complete games in 1978, and he helped them to a World Series victory in 1979. His 20 no decisions in 1979 are the most by an MLB starting pitcher in a season from 1908 to 2018. (Ryne Stanek, a reliever who worked as an opener, had more no decisions in both 2018 and 2019, and starter Zach Davies matched Blyleven's mark in 2022.)

Blyleven became disgruntled with the Pirates and threatened to retire during the 1980 season if he was not traded. The Pirates traded him to the Cleveland Indians on December 9, 1980. Blyleven sat out most of the 1982 season with an elbow injury and struggled again in 1983, but he came back in 1984 with one of his best seasons: a 19–7 record with a 2.87 ERA. He missed a second 20-win season that year when he was forced to miss a couple of starts after breaking his foot after slipping on a baseball while running. In 1985, he again led the American League in shutouts with five. That year, he pitched 293 2/3 innings and completed 24 games, feats of endurance no pitcher has matched since. Blyleven was unhappy playing for the lackluster Indians and forced a trade back to the Twins on August 1, 1985. With Minnesota, he passed the 3,000-strikeout mark and helped the team win the 1987 World Series.

Blyleven's first two full seasons back with the Twins produced major league records for home runs allowed in a single season (50) and in consecutive seasons (96). He never surrendered more than 24 home runs in any year before or after the 1986 and 1987 seasons. He finished his career with 430 home runs allowed, ninth most in MLB history. This was partly due to his longevity, as he allowed a home run to 2.1 percent of batters faced, only slightly above the MLB average during his career.

The Twins traded Blyleven and Kevin Trudeau to the California Angels before the 1989 season for Paul Sorrento, Mike Cook, and Rob Wassenaar. Blyleven had a 2.73 ERA and 17–5 record in his first season close to his hometown. He led the league for his third and final time in shutouts (5). Blyleven missed the entire 1991 season following rotator cuff surgery. He came back in 1992 but was mostly unproductive, going 8–12 with a 4.74 ERA in his final MLB season. He signed again with the Twins in early 1993 but did not make the opening day roster and retired. He also pitched for the MLB All-Stars, a team of mostly minor league players, in the World Port Tournament in Rotterdam in the summer of 1993. That July, he became a roving pitching instructor for the Angels.

Blyleven had a career 287–250 record with 3,701 strikeouts and a 3.31 ERA. He ranks fifth in MLB history in strikeouts and is ninth with 60 shutouts and 430 home runs allowed and 14th in innings pitched with 4,970. He has the seventh most career wins above replacement among pitchers according to FanGraphs and 14th most according to Baseball Reference. Hall of Fame third baseman Brooks Robinson said of Blyleven: "[his curveball] was nasty, I'll tell you that. Enough to make your knees buckle. Bert was a terrific pitcher—a dominating pitcher."

Blyleven was a pitching coach for the Netherlands in the 2009 World Baseball Classic. He returned to that role for the 2013, 2017, and 2023 tournaments.

== Honors ==
After his first year of Baseball Hall of Fame eligibility in 1998, Blyleven was widely considered to be the best eligible pitcher not yet enshrined. According to Matt Welch of Reason Magazine, "there had long been a strong case that the Dutch-born curveballista was the most deserving player on the outside of Cooperstown looking in." Still, it was not until his 14th year of eligibility, in 2011, that he was elected; he received 79.7% of the vote. He currently ranks fifth all-time in strikeouts, ninth in shutouts, and 27th all-time in wins. At the time of his election, he was the only eligible member of the 3,000 strikeout club and the only pitcher with 50 or more shutouts not in the Hall of Fame.

Blyleven received only 17.6% of the vote for Hall of Fame admission in 1998 (his first year of eligibility), and his vote total dropped to 14.1% in 1999. No player who had debuted on the ballot since 1970 had a vote total that low and later won election to the Hall. However, ESPN.com columnist Jayson Stark said, "No player has ever—and again, that word is 'ever'—had his Hall of Fame candidacy helped more by the sabermetrics boom than Blyleven." Specifically, according to Welch, "the president and chief investment officer of Lederer & Associates Investment Counsel in Long Beach, California, a guy by the name of Rich Lederer, began spending some of his off-hours writing analysis on the Interwebs about Blyleven's overlooked case."

By 2006, his total had increased to 53.3%. In 2007, Blyleven's total dipped to 47.7% (75% is the minimum required for admission to the Hall). In 2008, he received 336 votes, or 61.9% of the vote. In 2009, he gained only two votes, for a total of 338, 62.7%. In 2010, Blyleven had 74.2% of the votes, missing admission to the Hall of Fame by only 5 votes (0.8%).

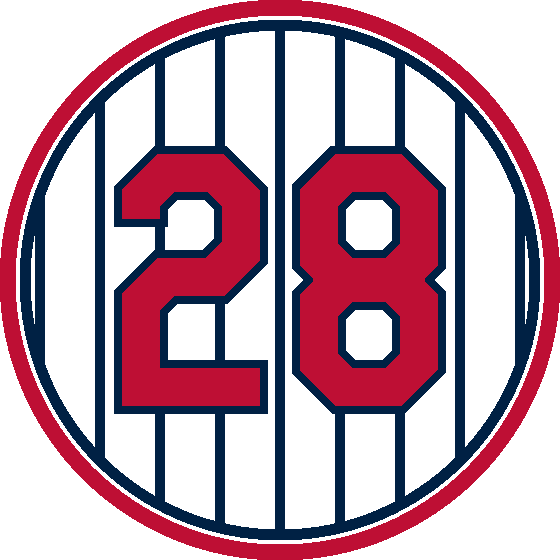
Bert Blyleven's number 28 was retired by the Minnesota Twins in 2011.

Blyleven was inducted to the Hall of Fame in 2011 after receiving 79.7% of the vote on his 14th attempt. "It's been 14 years of praying and waiting," he said on a conference call. "I thank the baseball writers of America for, I'm going to say, finally getting it right." Blyleven was the first Dutch-born player inducted. His Hall of Fame plaque depicts him with a Minnesota Twins cap.

Blyleven was inducted into the Minnesota Twins Hall of Fame in 2002 and was selected by fans to the "All-Metrodome Team" on July 28, 2009. On July 16, 2011, the Twins retired Blyleven's number.

In 2020, sportswriter Joe Posnanski ranked Blyleven at number 71 on The Athletic's "Baseball 100" list.

== Broadcasting career ==
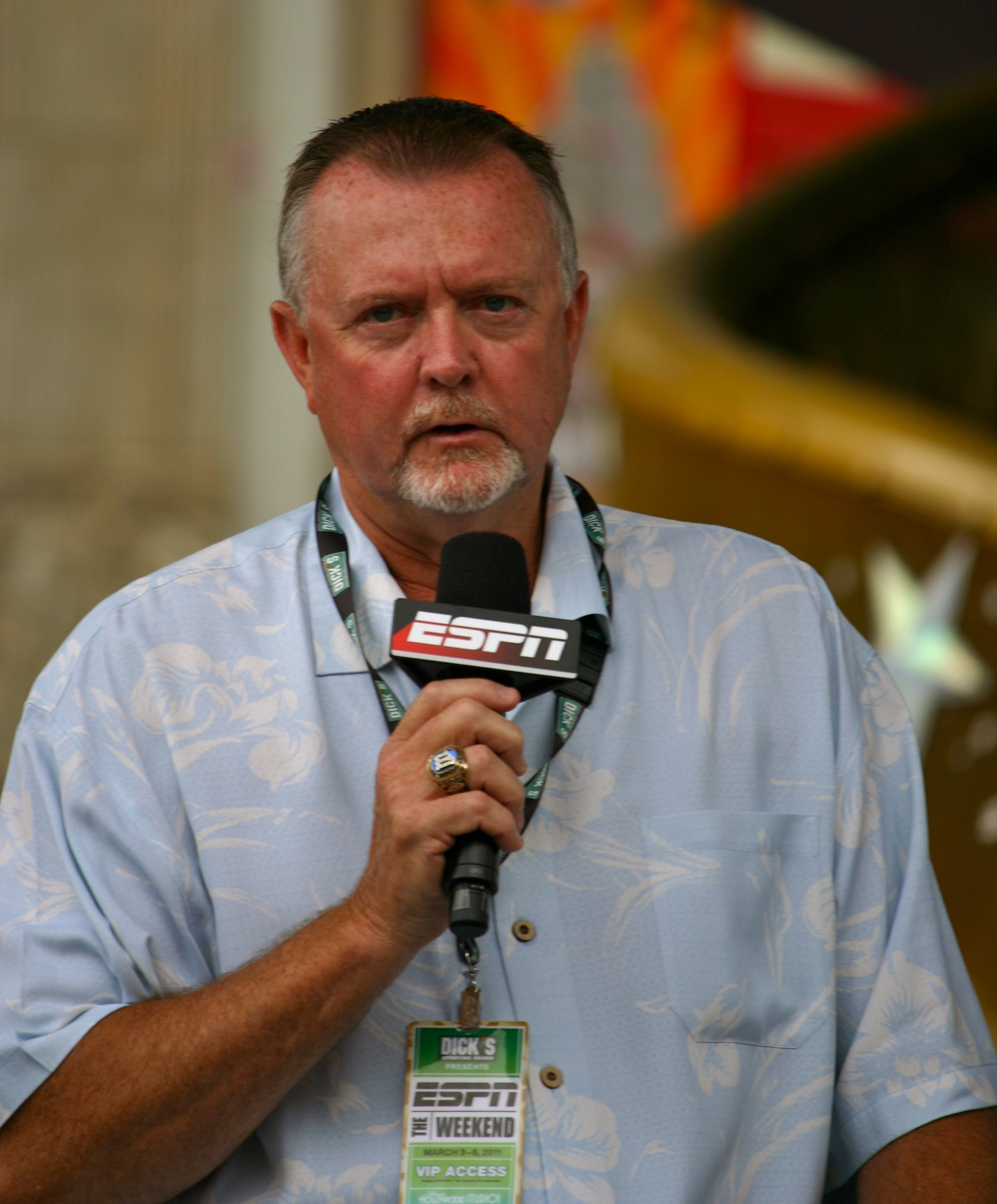
Blyleven answering questions in March 2011

In 1996, Blyleven became a television color commentator for the Twins, calling games for WCCO-TV and Midwest Sports Channel (later Fox Sports North). Blyleven's commentary was occasionally risqué for a baseball broadcast but provided interesting and friendly conversation between him and play-by-play announcer Dick Bremer.

One of his trademarks was circling fans with the telestrator on screen. Fans, both at home and at road games, carried signs to the games saying "Circle me Bert". This led to a fundraising campaign with the Parkinson's Foundation and a sponsorship with the Minnesota Lottery. When announcing partner Bremer attempted to circle fans with the telestrator, he drew geometric forms that were non-circular, and Blyleven and fans started to jostle Bremer with phrases like "Rhombus me, Dick" or "Triangle me, Dick".

On September 3, 2006, Blyleven accidentally used two profanities on air during a game against the New York Yankees because he believed the broadcast was being taped rather than aired live. FSN North suspended Blyleven five games for the incident, stating: "Bert would never do this intentionally. Having said that, there are consequences for our actions, and we feel this is an appropriate consequence."

On September 2, 2020, Blyleven broadcast his final game for the Twins. He became a special assistant for the Twins.

== Personal life ==
Blyleven resides in Fort Myers, Florida as of 2017.

Blyleven became a naturalized citizen of the United States.

Blyleven's son Todd pitched in Minor League Baseball from 1993 to 1997 and later worked as a scout for the Arizona Diamondbacks and Colorado Rockies. Todd later was present at the 2017 Las Vegas shooting, helping others to safety.

Blyleven appeared as himself in the 1990 James Belushi film Taking Care of Business. During a 2006 broadcast, Blyleven forgot the name of the movie and had to be reminded of it by a technician in the broadcast booth.

Blyleven was a notorious dugout prankster as a player. He earned the moniker "Frying Dutchman" by frequently setting fire to his teammates' shoelaces, a practical joke known as a "hot foot". During his time with the Angels, the fire extinguisher in the team's clubhouse at Angel Stadium read: "In case of Blyleven: Pull".

Blyleven did not know his correct name until he was about to get married. He had thought all his life his given name was "Rikaalbert". He learned that his name actually was Rik Aalbert Blijleven after obtaining a copy of his birth certificate in order to get married.

== Career statistics ==
Category	W	L	PCT	ERA	G	GS	CG	SHO	SV	IP	H	ER	R	HR	BB	K	WP	HBP
Total	287	250	.534	3.31	692	685	242	60	0	4970	4632	1830	2029	430	1322	3701	114	155

== See also ==
- List of Major League Baseball annual shutout leaders
- List of Major League Baseball annual strikeout leaders
- List of Major League Baseball career hit batsmen leaders
- List of Major League Baseball career shutout leaders
- List of Major League Baseball career strikeout leaders
- List of Major League Baseball career wins leaders
- List of Major League Baseball no-hitters
- List of World Series starting pitchers

Awards and achievements
Preceded by Dennis Eckersley	No-hitter pitcher September 22, 1977	Succeeded by Bob Forsch
