= Adrian Devine =

American baseball player (1951–2020)

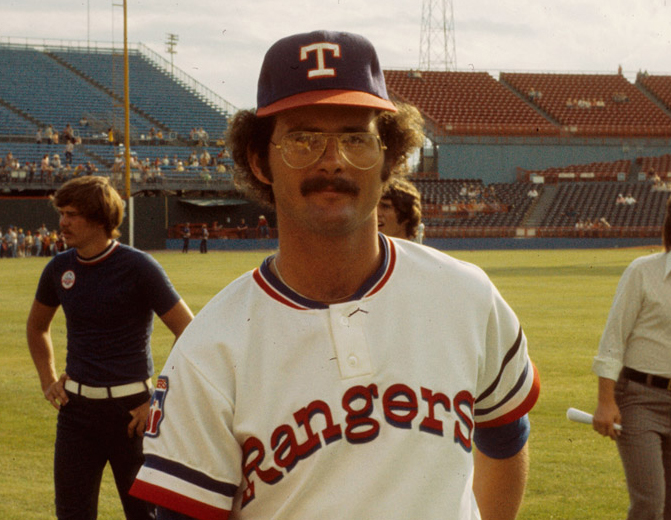
- Pitcher
- Born: December 2, 1951; Galveston, Texas, U.S.
- Died: June 27, 2020 (aged 68); Dacula, Georgia, U.S.
- Batted: Right Threw: Right

MLB debut
- June 27, 1973, for the Atlanta Braves

Last MLB appearance
- July 3, 1980, for the Texas Rangers

MLB statistics
- Win–loss record: 26–22
- Earned run average: 4.21
- Strikeouts: 194
- Stats at Baseball Reference

Teams
- Atlanta Braves (1973, 1975–1976); Texas Rangers (1977); Atlanta Braves (1978–1979); Texas Rangers (1980)

Paul Adrian Devine (December 2, 1951 – June 27, 2020) was an American professional baseball player. He played in Major League Baseball as a right-handed pitcher in 1973 and from 1975 through 1980 for the Atlanta Braves and Texas Rangers. He batted and threw right-handed and served primarily as a relief pitcher.

Devine was drafted by the Atlanta Braves in 1970 and played for three of their minor league affiliates until 1973, when the Braves promoted him to the major leagues. After missing most of the 1974 season due to injury, he came back the following year and pitched well in the minors, resulting in him being called back up to the Braves that September when rosters expanded. After spending one more season with the organization, he was traded to the Texas Rangers. He was subsequently dealt back to Braves after one season. He returned to the Rangers in 1980 and played his last game on July 3 that year.

== Early life ==
Devine was born in Galveston, Texas on December 2, 1951. He attended Ball High School. He was subsequently drafted by the Atlanta Braves in the 2nd round of the 1970 Major League Baseball draft.

== Professional career ==
Devine made his Major League Baseball debut on June 27, 1973, at the age of 21, starting against the San Francisco Giants and giving up 5 earned runs in 5 innings in a 6–5 loss. He suffered an arm injury that caused him to miss most of the 1974 season. Although doctors advised him to retire from baseball and return to school, Devine elected to have surgery and attempt to pitch again during spring training in 1975. After pitching for the Class-AAA Richmond Braves and compiling a 10–6 win–loss record and a 2.98 ERA in 27 games during the 1975 season, he was called back up by the Braves during the September roster expansion that year.

Devine was part of a five-for-one trade that sent him, Ken Henderson, Dave May, Roger Moret, Carl Morton and $200,000 from the Braves to the Rangers for Jeff Burroughs on December 9, 1976. He saved two games in one day against the Minnesota Twins on September 18, 1977, while pitching for the Rangers during a doubleheader. He finished seventh in the American League (AL) that year in saves with 15.

Devine was traded back to the Braves from the Rangers along with Tommy Boggs and Eddie Miller in the first four-team blockbuster deal in Major League Baseball history on December 8, 1977, that also involved the Pittsburgh Pirates, New York Mets and a total of eleven players changing teams. The Rangers received Al Oliver and Nelson Norman from the Pirates and Jon Matlack from the Mets. The Pirates acquired Bert Blyleven from the Rangers and John Milner from the Mets. The Mets got from the Braves Willie Montañez and from the Rangers Tom Grieve and Ken Henderson who was sent to New York to complete the transaction three months later on March 15, 1978. Devine was the winning pitcher in manager Bobby Cox's first win as a major league manager for the Atlanta Braves (against the Padres on April 10, 1978).

Devine played his final major league game on July 3, 1980, at the age of 28. He briefly played for the Wichita Aeros (the Rangers' Class-AAA affiliate) the following year, and was subsequently released by the organization that June.

== Later life ==
Devine's youngest son, Travis, was drafted in the 4th round of the 1998 Major League Baseball draft by the San Diego Padres. He went on to play four seasons in the minor leagues. Travis now owns and operates Devine Baseball, a baseball instructional academy, in Buford, Georgia.

Devine overcame tongue cancer twice and brain cancer from 2005 until his death. His bout with the former resulted in his being unable to speak. He ultimately suffered a relapse in his lungs. He died on June 27, 2020, at the age of 68.
