= Bobby Thompson (baseball) =

American baseball player (1953-2011)

- Center fielder
- Born: November 3, 1953; Charlotte, North Carolina, U.S.
- Died: April 25, 2011 (aged 57); Charlotte, North Carolina, U.S.
- Batted: Both Threw: Right

MLB debut
- April 16, 1978, for the Texas Rangers

Last MLB appearance
- September 25, 1978, for the Texas Rangers

MLB statistics
- Batting average: .225
- Home runs: 2
- Runs batted in: 12
- Stats at Baseball Reference

Teams
- Texas Rangers (1978)

Bobby La Rue Thompson (November 3, 1953 – April 25, 2011) was an outfielder in Major League Baseball, playing mainly at centerfield for the Texas Rangers during the 1978 season. Listed at 5' 11", 175 lb., Thompson was a switch-hitter and threw right-handed. He was born in Charlotte, North Carolina.

Following his graduation from Harry P. Harding High School, Thompson became the first African American born in Charlotte to join the Major Leagues. He was selected by the Texas Rangers in the 1972 amateur draft, and played six years in the Rangers Minor league system before joining the big team on April 16, 1978.

In his only major league season, Thompson served as a reserve outfielder for Al Oliver, Juan Beníquez and Bobby Bonds, being also used in pinch-hitting and pinch-running duties while appearing in 64 games. He hit for a .225 average (27-for-120), including three doubles, three triples, two home runs and seven stolen bases, while driving in 12 runs and scoring 23 times. He played his last game on September 25. In a six-season minor league career, he hit .273 and 29 home runs in 520 games.

Thompson died at his residence in Charlotte at the age of 57.
