= Willie Montañez =

Puerto Rican baseball player (born 1948)

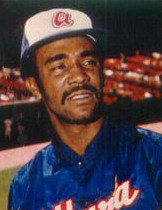
- First baseman / Outfielder
- Born: April 1, 1948 (age 78); Cataño, Puerto Rico
- Batted: Left Threw: Left

MLB debut
- April 12, 1966, for the California Angels

Last MLB appearance
- October 2, 1982, for the Philadelphia Phillies

MLB statistics
- Batting average: .275
- Home runs: 139
- Runs batted in: 802
- Stats at Baseball Reference

Teams
- California Angels (1966); Philadelphia Phillies (1970–1975); San Francisco Giants (1975–1976); Atlanta Braves (1976–1977); New York Mets (1978–1979); Texas Rangers (1979); San Diego Padres (1980); Montreal Expos (1980–1981); Pittsburgh Pirates (1981–1982); Philadelphia Phillies (1982)

Career highlights and awards
- All-Star (1977)

Guillermo Montañez Naranjo (born April 1, 1948) is a Puerto Rican former professional baseball first baseman, who played in Major League Baseball (MLB) for the California Angels (1966), Philadelphia Phillies (1970–1975, 1982), San Francisco Giants (1975–1976), Atlanta Braves (1976–1977), New York Mets (1978–1979), Texas Rangers (1979), San Diego Padres (1980), Montreal Expos (1980–1981), and Pittsburgh Pirates (1981-1982). He batted and threw left-handed.

Along with Tito Fuentes, Montañez was most noted for being one of MLB's two most flamboyant personalities during the 1970s, so much so that he was labeled a hot dog by detractors. He once commented, “I don't mind being called a hot dog, but it all depends on how people say it."

== Career ==
=== California Angels ===
Montañez was born in Cataño, Puerto Rico, and was originally signed by the St. Louis Cardinals as an amateur in 1965. After one season with the Florida Rookie League Cardinals, he was selected by the California Angels in the 1965 Rule 5 draft, and made his major league debut with the Angels in their 1966 season opener as a pinch runner for Norm Siebern in the 14th inning. The Chicago White Sox won the game in the bottom of the inning before Montañez could log an at bat, however, he did have two at bats without a hit with the Angels before being returned to the Cardinals on May 5.

=== Philadelphia Phillies ===
On October 7, 1969, the Cardinals traded Curt Flood, Byron Browne, Joe Hoerner and Tim McCarver to the Philadelphia Phillies for Dick Allen, Jerry Johnson and Cookie Rojas. When Curt Flood refused to report to his new team, the Cardinals sent Montañez and Jim Browning to the Phillies to complete the trade. He appeared in eighteen games with the Phillies in 1970, mostly in the outfield, and collected three runs batted in and scored three runs.

In 1971, Montañez was tabbed as the starting center fielder for the Phillies, and responded with a career-high 30 home runs (still a Phillies' rookie record), 99 runs batted in, and a league-leading thirteen sacrifice flies. He finished second behind Atlanta Braves catcher Earl Williams in the National League Rookie of the Year balloting.

In 1972, Montañez led the National League in doubles (39), and tied for the league lead in outfield assists with fifteen. With Del Unser's arrival in Philadelphia in 1973, Montañez returned to his natural position at first base where he stayed for the remainder of his career.

Montañez batted over .300 for the first time in his career in 1974 (.304). Made expendable after the Phillies claimed Dick Allen off waivers from the Atlanta Braves one week earlier, he was traded to the San Francisco Giants for Garry Maddox on May 4, 1975.

=== San Francisco Giants ===
Though he was batting .286 with the Phillies at the time of the trade, he ended the season with a .302 batting average for the second of his three consecutive seasons batting over .300. He also collected a career high 101 runs batted in between his two teams, and emerged as one of the league's top fielding first basemen, leading the league first basemen in assists for the first of three times in his career (1975, 1976 and 1978).

=== Atlanta Braves ===
For the second season in a row, Montañez found himself changing teams in the middle of the season when the Giants sent him to the Braves with Jake Brown, Mike Eden and Craig Robinson for Darrell Evans and Marty Perez on June 13, 1976. As a result, Montañez played in an unusual 163 games. At the time of the trade, Montañez had appeared in sixty games for the Giants. He then appeared in 103 games for the Braves, bringing his total to 163 games in a 162-game season. He was named first baseman on The Sporting News NL All-Star team.

The Braves lost 101 games in 1977, and Montañez was selected as the team's sole representative at the 1977 All-Star Game. He went 0 for 2 in his only All-Star game.

=== New York Mets ===
Montañez was dealt by the Braves to the New York Mets in the first four-team deal in Major League Baseball history on December 8, 1977 that also involved the Texas Rangers, Pittsburgh Pirates and a total of eleven players changing teams. The Mets also got from the Rangers Tom Grieve and Ken Henderson who was sent to New York to complete the transaction three months later on March 15, 1978. Adrian Devine, Tommy Boggs and Eddie Miller were traded from the Rangers to the Braves. The Rangers received Al Oliver and Nelson Norman from the Pirates and Jon Matlack from the Mets. The Pirates acquired Bert Blyleven from the Rangers and John Milner from the Mets.

Montañez found himself, again, on a last place team as the 1978 Mets narrowly avoided losing 100 games themselves. However, Montañez emerged as one of the few bright spots on the team, leading it with seventeen home runs and 96 runs batted in.

=== Texas Rangers ===
Montañez's fortunes with the Mets turned around substantially in 1979. He was batting only .234 with five home runs and 47 runs batted in when the Mets sent him to the Texas Rangers for two players to be named later. In 71 fewer games with the Rangers, he swatted eight home runs and batted .319. Following the season, he was traded to the San Diego Padres for Tucker Ashford, Joe Carroll and future Hall of Famer Gaylord Perry.

=== Montreal Expos ===
The 1980 Montreal Expos were in a tight division race with the Philadelphia Phillies throughout the season. They completed a deadline deal for Montañez on August 31, 1980 for Tony Phillips and cash. In fourteen games with the Montreal Expos, Montañez batted .211 with one run batted in.

=== Return to Philadelphia ===
On August 20, 1981, he was again involved in a trade with John Milner—this time going from the Montreal Expos to the Pittsburgh Pirates. He was released by the Pirates on July 1, 1982. Ironically, Milner was released by the Expos four days later, and signed with the Pirates later in the month. Montañez signed with the Phillies for the remainder of the season, at the end of which he retired.

Montañez had a career .992 fielding percentage at first base, and led National League first basemen in assists in 1975, 1976 and 1978. From 1975 to 1978 he collected 349 runs batted in.

=== Career statistics ===
Years	Games	PA	AB	R	H	2B	3B	HR	RBI	BB	SO	AVG	OBP	SLG	FLD%
14	1632	6407	5843	645	1604	279	25	139	802	465	751	.275	.327	.402	.991

== See also ==
- List of Major League Baseball annual doubles leaders
