= Tommy Boggs =

American baseball player (1955–2022)

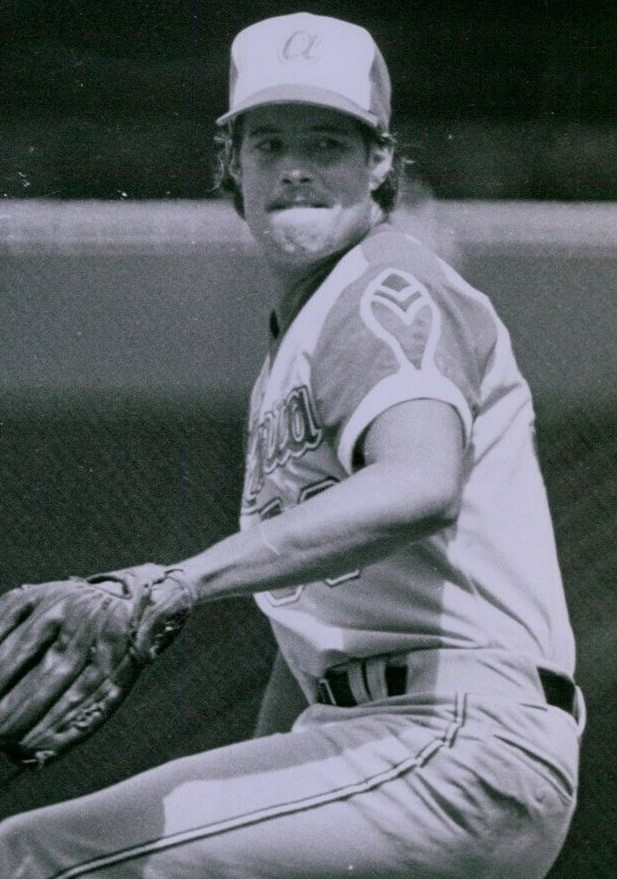
- Boggs in 1978
- Pitcher
- Born: October 25, 1955; Poughkeepsie, New York, U.S.
- Died: October 5, 2022 (aged 66); Salado, Texas, U.S.
- Batted: Right Threw: Right

MLB debut
- July 19, 1976, for the Texas Rangers

Last MLB appearance
- May 7, 1985, for the Texas Rangers

MLB statistics
- Win–loss record: 20–44
- Earned run average: 4.22
- Strikeouts: 278
- Stats at Baseball Reference

Teams
- Texas Rangers (1976–1977); Atlanta Braves (1978–1983); Texas Rangers (1985)

Thomas Winton Boggs (October 25, 1955 – October 5, 2022) was an American professional baseball player and college baseball coach. He played in Major League Baseball as a right-handed pitcher for the Texas Rangers (1976–1977, 1985) and the Atlanta Braves (1978–1983).

== Playing career ==
Boggs attended Lanier High School in Austin, Texas. In 1974, his senior year, he was named his district's player of the year as he pitched to a 0.73 earned run average (ERA).

The Texas Rangers selected Boggs in the first round, with the second overall pick, in the 1974 Major League Baseball draft. He made his major league debut with the Rangers on July 19, 1976.

Boggs was traded to the Atlanta Braves on December 8, 1977, in the first four-team trade in MLB history, which also involved the Pittsburgh Pirates, New York Mets and a total of eleven players changing teams. The Rangers sent Boggs, Adrian Devine, and Eddie Miller to the Braves. The Rangers received Al Oliver and Nelson Norman from the Pirates and Jon Matlack from the Mets. The Pirates acquired Bert Blyleven from the Rangers and John Milner from the Mets. The Mets got from the Braves Willie Montañez and from the Rangers Tom Grieve and Ken Henderson who was sent to New York to complete the transaction three months later on March 15, 1978

Boggs suffered from a recurring rotator cuff injury during the 1982 and 1983 seasons. After the 1983 season, the Braves gave Boggs his unconditional release. Boggs signed a minor league contract with the Rangers in 1984. He spent the 1984 season in the minor leagues and won a roster spot with the Rangers Opening Day of the 1985 season. The Rangers sent Boggs to the minor leagues on May 12.

== Coaching career ==
Concordia University Texas hired Boggs as their head baseball coach on May 14, 2009. He won his 300th game in March 2020, and led the Concordia Tornadoes to 325 wins in 13 seasons.

== Personal life ==
Boggs was born in Poughkeepsie, New York. His grandparents took him to baseball games at Yankee Stadium.

Boggs and his wife, Suzette, had two children.

In December 1983, Boggs was indicted for gambling, a misdemeanor charge, along with 22 other people involved in a gambling ring in DeKalb County, Georgia. The criminal charge delayed the completion of his contract with the Rangers the following year. He pled guilty and was sentenced to a $1,000 fine and one year of probation.

Boggs died from cancer on October 5, 2022, at age 66.
