= Tom Grieve =

American baseball player and broadcaster (born 1948)

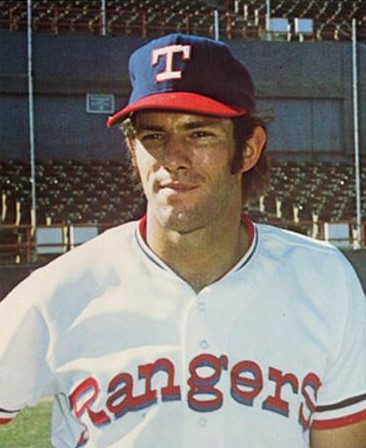
- Outfielder
- Born: March 4, 1948 (age 78); Pittsfield, Massachusetts, U.S.
- Batted: Right Threw: Right

MLB debut
- July 5, 1970, for the Washington Senators

Last MLB appearance
- May 1, 1979, for the St. Louis Cardinals

MLB statistics
- Batting average: .249
- Home runs: 65
- Runs batted in: 254
- Stats at Baseball Reference

Teams
- Washington Senators / Texas Rangers (1970, 1972–1977); New York Mets (1978); St. Louis Cardinals (1979)

Career highlights and awards
- Texas Rangers Hall of Fame

Thomas Alan Grieve (born March 4, 1948) is an American former professional baseball player. He played in Major League Baseball from 1970 to 1979 for the Washington Senators / Texas Rangers, New York Mets and St. Louis Cardinals. He was nicknamed "TAG", which are his initials, and most notably as "Mr. Ranger", as he was a member of the Texas Rangers' 1972 inaugural season. In 2010, Grieve was inducted into the Texas Rangers Hall of Fame.

== Biography ==
=== Baseball career ===
Grieve was drafted by the Washington Senators in the 1st round (6th pick) of the 1966 MLB June Amateur Draft from Pittsfield High School. Before signing with Washington in the summer of 1966, Grieve played in the Cape Cod Baseball League (CCBL) with the Chatham Red Sox. He hit .416 in 25 games, and in 2010 was inducted into the CCBL Hall of Fame.

Grieve's best season was 1976 with the Rangers when he hit .255, belted 20 home runs and had 81 runs batted in.

Grieve was dealt from the Rangers to the Mets in the first four-team blockbuster deal in Major League Baseball history on December 8, 1977 that also involved the Atlanta Braves, Pittsburgh Pirates and a total of eleven players changing teams. The Mets got from the Braves Willie Montañez and also from the Rangers Ken Henderson who was sent to New York to complete the transaction three months later on March 15, 1978. The Rangers received Al Oliver and Nelson Norman from the Pirates and Jon Matlack from the Mets. Adrian Devine, Tommy Boggs and Eddie Miller were traded from the Rangers to the Braves. The Pirates acquired Bert Blyleven from the Rangers and John Milner from the Mets.

Grieve was traded along with Kim Seaman from the Mets to the St. Louis Cardinals for Pete Falcone at the Winter Meetings on December 5, 1978. Primarily an outfielder and a designated hitter, the right-handed batter finished his career with a .249 average, 65 homers and 254 RBIs in 670 games.

In between, Grieve posted five solid seasons in the Venezuelan Winter League while playing for the Águilas del Zulia, Leones del Caracas and Tiburones de La Guaira clubs between 1971 and 1979.

According to his own words, he says that any player who skips winter ball does themselves a disservice because they're too lazy.

=== General Manager ===
After retiring as a player at the end of the 1979 season, Grieve joined the Rangers' front office, and did his first work as a color commentator for Rangers television broadcasts during the 1980 season. In 1984 Grieve became general manager of the Rangers, and served in that capacity until 1994. In December 1988 Grieve made one of the best trades in team history, acquiring Rafael Palmeiro and Jamie Moyer from the Chicago Cubs for Mitch Williams. That same winter he acquired future batting champion Julio Franco. However, he also traded away several future stars, including Sammy Sosa in 1989 and Robb Nen in 1993.

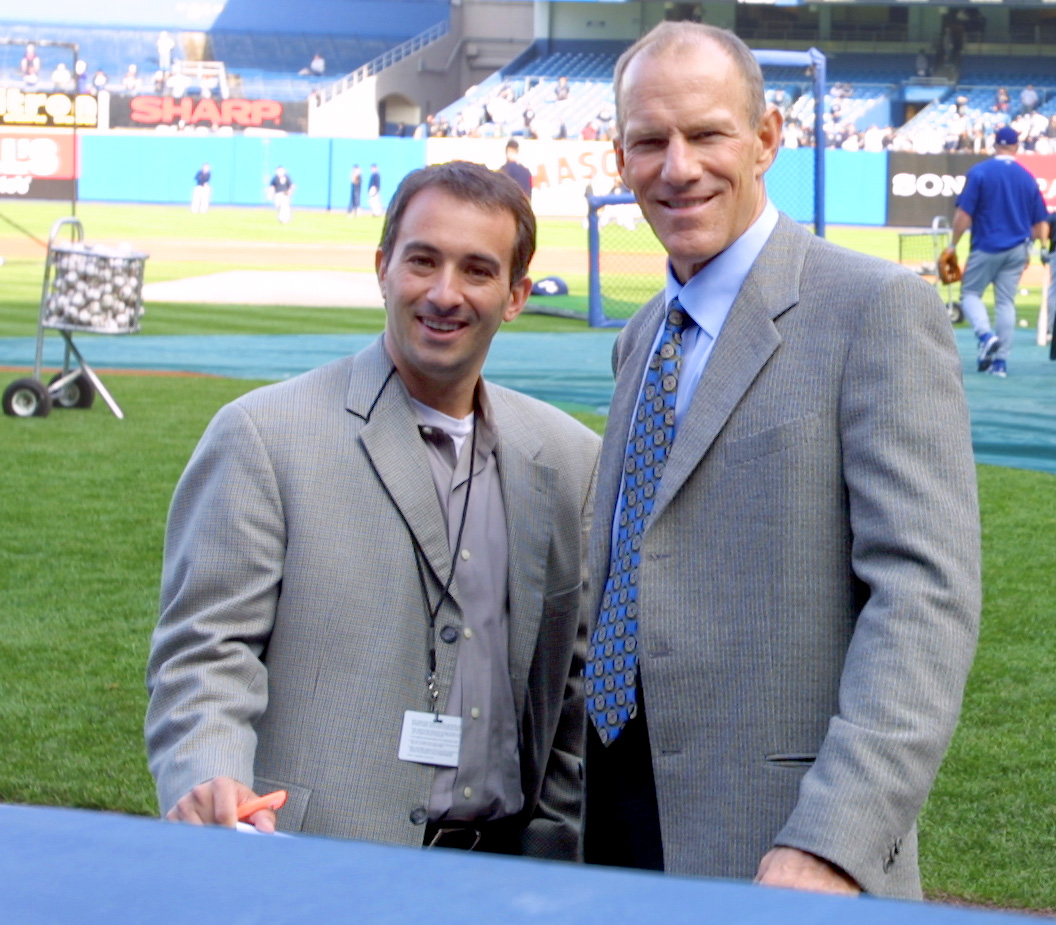
Grieve (right) alongside former Rangers commentator Josh Lewin

=== Broadcasting career ===
Since 1995, Grieve has served as the color commentator for the Texas Rangers, which is the longest tenure of any TV broadcaster in Texas Rangers club history. Since 2017, he has split duties with C.J. Nitkowski. He announced his retirement after the 2022 season.

=== Legacy ===
The Grieves were the first father-and-son combo to be selected in the first round of the MLB draft. Tom was chosen sixth overall by the Senators in 1966 while Ben was the second overall selection by Oakland in 1994. Ben Grieve played 976 games for the Oakland A's, Tampa Bay Devil Rays, Milwaukee Brewers and the Chicago Cubs.

Tom Grieve was inducted into the Texas Rangers Hall of Fame in a ceremony held on July 24, 2010.

Preceded by Joe Klein	Texas Rangers General Manager; 1984–1994	Succeeded by Doug Melvin
