= Carl Morton =

American baseball player (1944–1983)

- Pitcher
- Born: January 18, 1944; Kansas City, Missouri, U.S.
- Died: April 12, 1983 (aged 39); Tulsa, Oklahoma, U.S.
- Batted: Right Threw: Right

MLB debut
- April 11, 1969, for the Montreal Expos

Last MLB appearance
- August 21, 1976, for the Atlanta Braves

MLB statistics
- Win–loss record: 87–92
- Earned run average: 3.73
- Strikeouts: 650
- Stats at Baseball Reference

Teams
- Montreal Expos (1969–1972); Atlanta Braves (1973–1976)

Career highlights and awards
- NL Rookie of the Year (1970)

Carl Wendle Morton (January 18, 1944 – April 12, 1983) was an American professional baseball pitcher who played eight seasons in Major League Baseball (MLB) with the Montreal Expos and the Atlanta Braves. Morton was named the NL Rookie of the Year in 1970 and posted a career record of 87–92 with 650 strikeouts and a 3.73 ERA in 1648.2 innings.

== Early years ==
Morton was born in Kansas City, Missouri, to Clyde and Merle Morton. He grew up in West Tulsa, where he played baseball on the same Webster High School team as future major-leaguer Rich Calmus. Morton went on to play outfield for the University of Oklahoma.

== Baseball career ==
Morton started his pro career as an outfielder in the Atlanta Braves organization and later converted to a pitcher. He was selected by the Montreal Expos in the 1968 expansion draft.

Morton's first career start was on April 11, 1969, the fourth game of the Montreal Expos as a franchise. He pitched nine innings while allowing six hits and no runs, with three strikeouts and walks each, but the Expos lost in the 12th inning 1–0 to the Chicago Cubs. He went 0-3 that season, having a 4.60 ERA in eight games pitched in 29.1 innings, having 16 strikeouts and 18 walks.

In 1970, Morton compiled an 18–11 record for the last-place Expos and was the National League Rookie of the Year, chosen over Bernie Carbo, Larry Bowa and César Cedeño. He had a 3.60 ERA in 43 games pitched, having 10 complete games, four shutouts while throwing 284.2 innings, 125 walks and 154 strikeouts, the latter three being career highs. He received votes for the Cy Young Award and the Most Valuable Player voting, finishing 9th and 27th, respectively. That same year he also received the Sporting News Rookie of the Year Award, becoming the first Montreal player to receive the honors.

Morton regressed in the following two seasons with Montreal, plagued by low run support. For 1971, he went 10–18 with a 4.80 ERA in 36 games, having nine complete games and one save on 213.2 innings of work, with 84 strikeouts and 83 walks. His one save came on June 21, 1971, during the second game of an Expos-Braves doubleheader. Morton retired the final batter of the game in a 5-3 Expos win. In his final year with the Expos, he went 7–13 with a 3.92 ERA in 27 games, having three complete games in 172 innings, having 51 strikeouts and 53 walks.

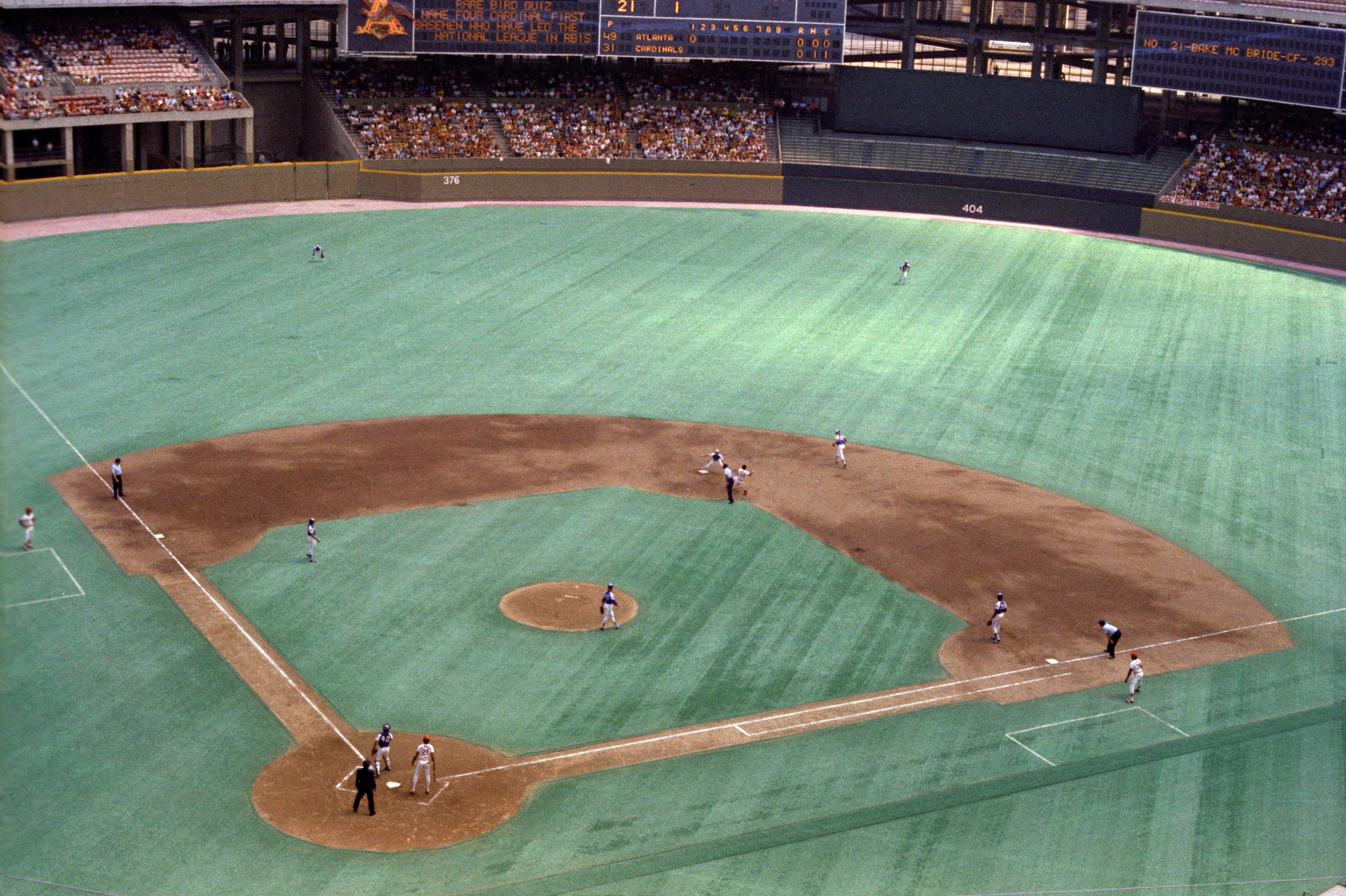
Morton on the mound in Busch Stadium, pitching for the Braves and watching Lou Brock of the Cardinals steal second base in the first inning of a 1975 game.

He was traded from the Expos to the Braves for Pat Jarvis on February 28, 1973. 1973 was a fair return to form for Morton. He went 15–10 with a 3.41 ERA in 38 games while having 10 complete games in 256.1 innings. He had 112 strikeouts and 70 walks. He ranked in the top 10 in numerous categories such as innings pitched (ninth), games started (sixth), shutouts (fifth), hits allowed (seventh) and batters faced (eighth with 1,074).

The following year had fairer returns. He went 16–12 with a 3.15 ERA in 38 games and seven complete games in 274.2 innings, with a career high 113 strikeouts and 89 walks, although he allowed a league high 293 hits. The team finished 88–74, best for third place behind the Los Angeles Dodgers by 14 games. It was the only time Morton played for a winning team in his career.

1975 consisted of ups and downs. He went 17-16 for a 3.50 ERA in 39 games, 277.2 innings, with 11 complete games and 302 hits allowed (the latter four being career highs). He had 78 strikeouts and 82 walks.

1976 was his final season in the majors. He went 4–9 with a 4.17 ERA in 26 games, having one complete game in 140.1 innings, having 42 strikeouts and 45 walks. His final game was on August 21 against the St. Louis Cardinals. He pitched 7 1/3 innings, allowing two runs on 10 hits with two strikeouts. He also went 3-for-4 for three RBIs (including a stolen base off Bob Forsch in the sixth inning) in the 6–2 win by the team.

Morton was part of a five-for-one trade that sent him, Ken Henderson, Dave May, Roger Moret, Adrian Devine and $200,000 from the Braves to the Rangers for Jeff Burroughs on December 9, 1976. He was released by the Rangers on April 1, 1977. He signed with the Philadelphia Phillies later in the 1977 season, but he did not play a game before being released on September 14. He signed with the Pittsburgh Pirates before the 1978 season, but he was released on March 18.

As a hitter, although posting only a .156 batting average (86-for-551), he did hit seven home runs with 42 RBI. He had a career high three home runs and 15 RBI for the Atlanta Braves in 1973. Defensively, he was above average, recording a .975 fielding percentage which was 26 points higher than the league average at his position.

Morton finished his career in the minors, pitching for the Rangers, Phillies and Pirates Triple-A teams until 1978.

== Death ==
Morton died on April 12, 1983, in Tulsa, Oklahoma, of a heart attack after jogging. He was survived by his wife Karen along with a son and stepdaughter.
