= Jon Matlack =

American baseball player (born 1950)

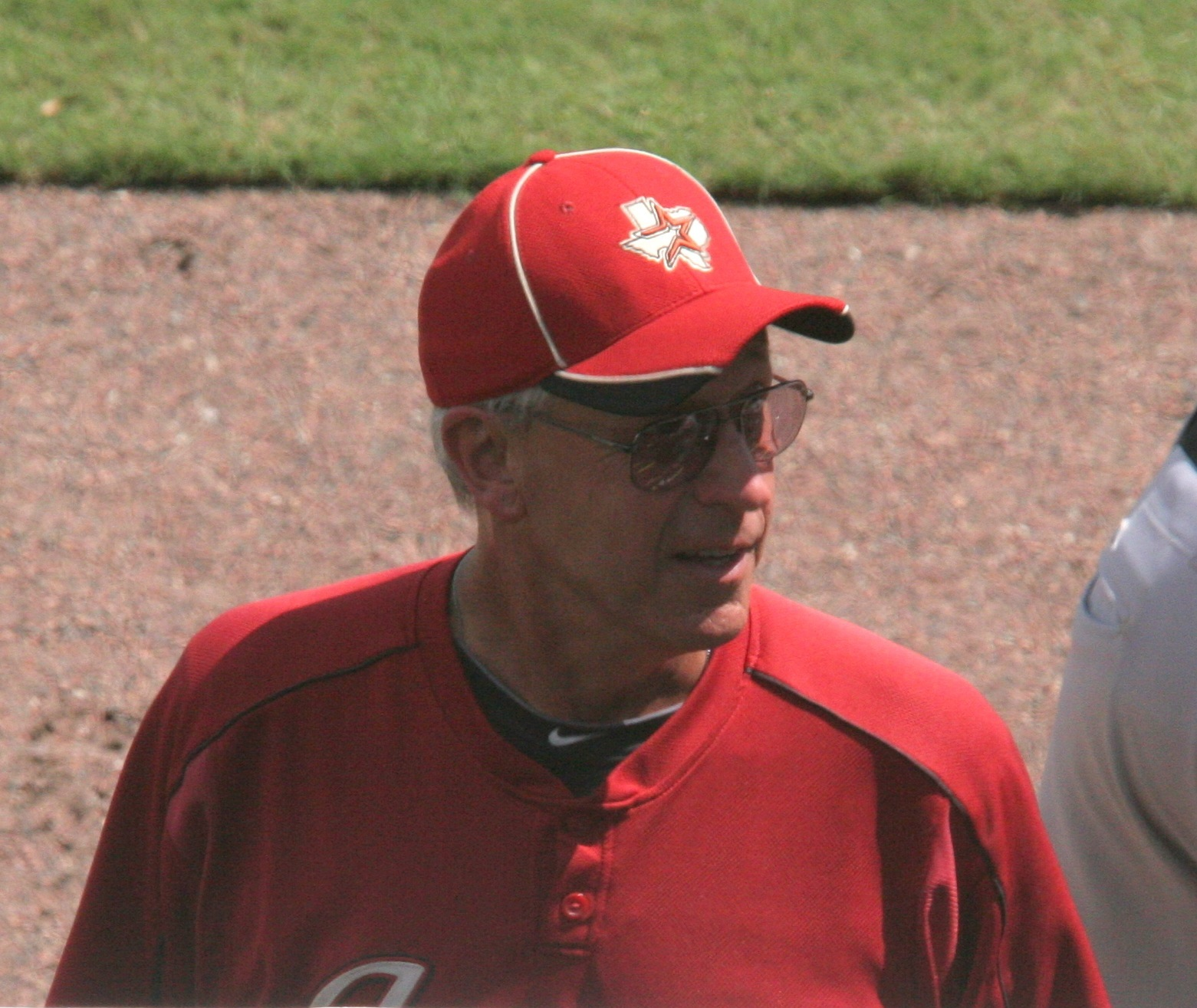
- Matlack in 2012
- Pitcher
- Born: January 19, 1950 (age 76); West Chester, Pennsylvania, U.S.
- Batted: Left Threw: Left

MLB debut
- July 11, 1971, for the New York Mets

Last MLB appearance
- September 15, 1983, for the Texas Rangers

MLB statistics
- Win–loss record: 125–126
- Earned run average: 3.18
- Strikeouts: 1,516
- Stats at Baseball Reference

Teams
- As player: New York Mets (1971–1977); Texas Rangers (1978–1983); As coach: Detroit Tigers (1996)

Career highlights and awards
- 3× All-Star (1974–1976); NL Rookie of the Year (1972); New York Mets Hall of Fame

Jonathan Trumpbour Matlack (born January 19, 1950) is an American former professional baseball player and coach. He played in Major League Baseball as a left-handed pitcher from 1971 through 1983 for the New York Mets and the Texas Rangers.

The three-time All-Star was named the 1972 National League Rookie of the Year and was a member of the 1973 National League pennant-winning New York Mets team. Matlack led the National League in shutouts in 1974 and 1976. He ranks in the top 10 among Mets pitchers in wins, complete games, ERA, strikeouts, shutouts and innings pitched. In 2020, Matlack was inducted into the New York Mets Hall of Fame.

== Early life ==
Matlack was born in West Chester, Pennsylvania. He was 17 years old when the Mets drafted him as the fourth overall pick in the 1967 Major League Baseball draft out of Henderson High School in the West Chester Area School District of Pennsylvania. His baseball career was delayed by his American Legion Baseball team's tournament. Once he was able to begin his professional baseball career, he was a disappointing 0–1 with a 14.40 earned run average for the Williamsport Mets, but improved to 3–2 with an even 2.00 earned run average later in the 1967 season for the Florida Instructional League Mets.

His rise to stardom began in 1968 with the Raleigh-Durham Mets. Matlack went 13–6 with a 2.76 earned run average and 188 strikeouts in 173 innings pitched. Along with fellow southpaw starters Charlie Hudson and Jerry Bark, he led the Mets to an 83–56 record, and first place in the Carolina League Eastern Division. His rise up the ranks continued in 1969, when he went 14-7 to lead the Triple-A Tidewater Tides to the International League championship.

== Career ==
=== New York Mets ===
A rhomboid muscle injury to Jerry Koosman opened a spot for a left hander in the Mets' starting rotation during the 1971 season. Matlack made his major league debut against the Cincinnati Reds in the second game of a July 11 doubleheader, and was on the line for the victory when he departed after seven innings. However, the Mets bullpen (including a blown save by Tom Seaver) was unable to secure the victory, and Matlack got a no decision in his major league debut.

Matlack was also in line for a victory in his second career start against the St. Louis Cardinals until the wheels came off in the seventh. After retiring the first two batters, Matlack walked the next two. Jim Beauchamp followed with a double to tie the score, and knock Matlack out of the game. A single by Ted Simmons (selected 6 spots after Matlack in the 1967 draft) scored Beauchamp with the go ahead run, charging Matlack with the loss in his second career start. For the season, Matlack went 0–3 with a 4.14 ERA in seven appearances (six starts). His finest pitching performance was his last, when he gave up just one run in eight innings of work against the Pittsburgh Pirates.

==== Rookie of the Year ====
Matlack made the team out of spring training in 1972, and got off to a 6–0 start with a 1.95 earned run average in the first two months of the season. He ended the season at 15–10 with a 2.32 ERA to win the National League Rookie of the Year award. On September 30, Matlack gave up Roberto Clemente's 3000th, and final, career hit.

On May 8, 1973, a vicious line drive off the bat of Marty Perez of the Atlanta Braves struck Matlack's head so hard that the ball rebounded into the dugout. He suffered a hairline fracture of his skull, but recovered quickly enough to return and pitch six shutout innings at Pittsburgh on May 19. He ended up winning fourteen games for the National League champion Mets.

==== 1973 NLCS & World Series ====
Matlack's record dipped to 14–16 in 1973, however, he was 5–1 from August 18 on, helping the Mets capture the National League East crown. Perhaps his most memorable moment with the Mets occurred on October 7, 1973, when he held the "Big Red Machine" to just two hits in Game 2 of the 1973 National League Championship Series. Both hits were by reserve outfielder Andy Kosco.

He was equally impressive in the 1973 World Series, giving up just three hits in six innings in game one of the World Series, however, the Oakland A's scored two runs on a Félix Millán error in the third, and held on for the 2–1 victory. He won game four, giving up just one run in eight innings. However, he lost the seventh and decisive game of the series 5-2; in the third inning of that game, he gave up two-run home runs to both Bert Campaneris and Reggie Jackson—the only two home runs Oakland hit during the Series.

==== All-Star ====
Matlack was an All-Star for the Mets for the next three seasons, sharing MVP honors in the 1975 game with Bill Madlock. In 1976, Matlack went 17–10 with a 2.95 earned run average and a league leading six shutouts to finish sixth in N.L. Cy Young Award balloting.

=== Texas Rangers ===
In 1977, Matlack's record dipped to 7–15 with a 4.21 earned run average (he had entered the season with a career earned run average of 2.88) for a Mets team that lost 98 games and finished last in the National League East Division. Matlack was dealt from the Mets to the Texas Rangers in the first four-team blockbuster deal in Major League Baseball history on December 8, 1977, that also involved the Atlanta Braves, Pittsburgh Pirates and a total of 11 players changing teams. The Rangers also received Al Oliver and Nelson Norman from the Pirates. The Mets got from the Braves Willie Montañez and from the Rangers Tom Grieve and Ken Henderson who was sent to New York to complete the transaction three months later on March 15, 1978. Adrian Devine, Tommy Boggs and Eddie Miller were traded from the Rangers to the Braves. The Pirates acquired Bert Blyleven from the Rangers and John Milner from the Mets.

Matlack went 15–13 with a 2.27 earned run average (second to Ron Guidry) and earned his first career save his first season in Texas, however elbow surgery limited him to just 13 starts in 1979. He rebounded to make 34 starts in 1980, one of which was on August 19, when he held George Brett, who was batting over .400, hitless, ending his 30-game hitting streak.

=== Stats ===
| W | L | PCT | ERA | G | GS | CG | SHO | SV | IP | BF | H | ER | R | HR | BAA | K | BB | BB/9 | WP | HBP | Fld% | Avg. |
| 125 | 126 | .498 | 3.18 | 361 | 318 | 97 | 30 | 3 | 2363 | 9789 | 2276 | 835 | 970 | 161 | .254 | 1516 | 638 | 2.4 | 68 | 26 | .952 | .129 |

Matlack compiled 1,023 strikeouts and a 3.03 earned run average as one of the "Big Three" pitchers the New York Mets were built around in the 1970s, along with Tom Seaver and Jerry Koosman. However, the Mets were also a light hitting team at the time, and his 82–81 record is not nearly indicative of how well he pitched for the club. On January 28, 2020, the Mets announced that Matlack will be inducted into the New York Mets Hall of Fame on May 17 in a ceremony at Citi Field.

- 1973 National League Championship Series
- 2× National League leader in shutouts (1974, 1976)
- National League leader in wins above replacement for pitchers (1974)
- American League leader in lowest base on balls ratio per 9 innings (1980)
- 3× Texas Rangers Opening Day Starter (1978, 1980, 1981)
- National League leader in Situational Wins Saved (1974)
- National League leader in fielding percentage by a pitcher (1974)
- American League leader in fielding percentage by a pitcher (1982)

== Coaching ==
Matlack retired following the 1983 season. After four years away from the game, he was hired as pitching coach for the San Diego Padres' Arizona League affiliate. He also coached in the Chicago White Sox organization before he was hired as the Detroit Tigers' major league pitching coach in 1996. He was later hired as their minor league pitching coordinator. He spent the 2012 season as the minor league pitching coordinator for the Houston Astros.

== Personal life ==
Matlack is the son of Ralph Matlack Jr. and Marcella Trumpbour. His parents married in 1947, in Saugerties, New York, and he had four younger siblings. His 2nd great-grandfather, William Trumpbour was postmaster of West Camp, New York from 1867 to 1869.

== See also ==
- List of Texas Rangers Opening Day starting pitchers
- List of Major League Baseball annual shutout leaders
- List of Major League Baseball All-Star Game Most Valuable Player Award winners

| Preceded by Ralph Treuel | Detroit Tigers pitching coach 1996 | Succeeded by Rick Adair |
