= Nelson Norman =

Dominican baseball player (born 1958)

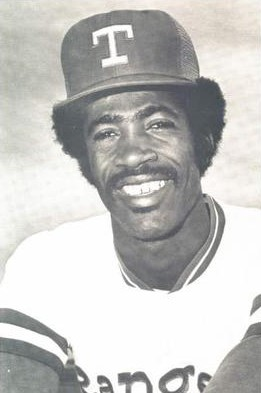
- Shortstop
- Born: May 23, 1958 (age 66); San Pedro de Macorís, Dominican Republic
- Batted: Switch Threw: Right

MLB debut
- May 20, 1978, for the Texas Rangers

Last MLB appearance
- April 29, 1987, for the Montreal Expos

MLB statistics
- Batting average: .221
- Home runs: 0
- Runs batted in: 25
- Stats at Baseball Reference

Teams
- As player: Texas Rangers (1978–1981); Pittsburgh Pirates (1982); Montreal Expos (1987); As coach: Boston Red Sox (2001)

Nelson Augusto Norman (born May 23, 1958) is a Dominican-American former professional baseball player, coach and manager. He played in Major League Baseball as a shortstop from 1978 to 1982 for the Texas Rangers and the Pittsburgh Pirates. He returned to the major leagues in 1987 with the Montreal Expos. After his playing career he continued to serve in minor league baseball as a coach and manager for several professional baseball organizations.

== Playing career ==
=== Pittsburgh Pirates ===
Norman was originally signed as a 16-year-old amateur free agent by the Pittsburgh Pirates in 1975. He made his professional debut with the minor league Gulf Coast League Pirates that year, batting .262 in 61 games. He made his way through their farm system quickly, and by the end of the 1977 season he was playing for the Triple-A Columbus Clippers.

=== Texas Rangers ===
==== 1978: MLB debut ====
Norman was traded along with Al Oliver from the Pirates to the Rangers in the first four-team blockbuster deal in Major League Baseball history on December 8, 1977 that also involved the Atlanta Braves, New York Mets and a total of eleven players changing teams. The Rangers also received Jon Matlack from the Mets. The Pirates acquired Bert Blyleven from the Rangers and John Milner from the Mets. Going to the Braves from the Rangers were Adrian Devine, Tommy Boggs and Eddie Miller. The Mets got from the Braves Willie Montañez and from the Rangers Tom Grieve and Ken Henderson who was sent to New York to complete the transaction three months later on March 15, 1978.

Norman started the 1978 season with the Tucson Toros. In mid-May, starting shortstop Bert Campaneris was injured, and Norman was called up to the majors to back up replacement Jim Mason. He made his major league debut on May 20, three days before his 20th birthday. He entered the game in the sixth inning after the Rangers had pinch-hit for Mason. He played three innings in the field, handling one chance on defense, before he was lifted for pinch hitter Mike Jorgensen. Two days later, Norman made his first start and got his first major league hit.

When Campaneris was activated in early June, Norman returned to Tucson. He spent the rest of the season there, batting .284 with 76 RBIs. He returned to the major leagues in September, finishing his first season with nine hits in 34 at bats.

==== 1979: Starter ====
In 1979, Norman won the starting shortstop job in spring training, beating out both Campaneris and newcomer Larvell Blanks, who had been acquired from the Cleveland Indians over the winter (Campaneris would be traded to the California Angels) in May. Norman played in 147 games, but batted just .222 with just 12 extra base hits in 343 at bats.

==== 1980–81: Back to the minors ====
Norman opened up the 1980 season as the starting shortstop again. However, by the end of April, he had lost the job to Pepe Frías, who had been acquired from the Atlanta Braves over the winter. In May, the Rangers signed Bud Harrelson to back up Frías, and Norman, who was hitting .219 in 17 games, was sent down to the minors. However, due to injury, he played in just 28 games for the Charleston Charlies, and did not play in the majors again that year.

Once again, the Rangers acquired a shortstop over the winter before the 1981 season. This time, it was Mario Mendoza, acquired in a trade from the Seattle Mariners. Norman started the season in the minors, playing for the Wichita Aeros. He batted .246 in 115 games, and earned a September call-up to the Rangers. He played in just seven games, going 3-for-13 at the plate. After the season, the Rangers traded Norman back to the Pirates for pitcher Víctor Cruz.

=== Back to the Pirates ===
Unfortunately for Norman, the Pirates already had Dale Berra entrenched as their starting shortstop. During spring training, Norman was beaten out for the backup job by minor league veteran Jim Smith, and for the second consecutive year he opened the year in the minors. After batting .270 in 134 games for the Portland Beavers, Norman was again called up in September, but this time played in just three games. He started the final game of the season, going 0-for-3.

In 1983, Norman was demoted to Double-A. He played the entire season with the Lynn Pirates, where he was moved to second base for most of the year. He batted .268 and had a career-high (at any level) of five home runs. In 1984, he was back in Triple-A with the Hawaii Islanders, where for the first time in his career he was not the full-time starter, splitting time in the middle infield with several other players. At the end of the year, he became a free agent.

=== Orioles and Expos ===
He signed with the Baltimore Orioles' organization, and spent the 1985 season playing second base. After hitting just .186, he was traded during the offseason to the Montreal Expos for fellow minor league veteran Steve Baker.

Norman finished his playing career in the Expos organization. After his abysmal 1985, he was returned to Double-A again in 1986 with the Jacksonville Expos. He spent his last three seasons as a player with the Indianapolis Indians before retiring in 1989. He did get to play one final game in the majors on April 29, 1987, starting at shortstop against his old team, the Pirates, and going 0-for-4.

== Post-playing career ==
After his playing career ended, Norman remained in the Expos organization as a minor league coach. In 1992, he was named manager of the Gulf Coast League Expos, where he managed until 1994. In 1995, he moved to the Braves organization, where he managed the Macon Braves. From 1997 through 2000, he was manager of the Dominican Summer League Red Sox. In 2001, he served as infield coach for the Boston Red Sox.

In 2007, Norman served as a coach for the Swing of the Quad Cities. From 2008 to 2010, he was the manager of the Dominican Summer League Cardinals, although he was replaced for part of 2009 by Claudio Almonte. As of 2015, Norman is a scout and director of Dominican operations for the Orioles.
