= Jeff Burroughs =

American baseball player (born 1951)

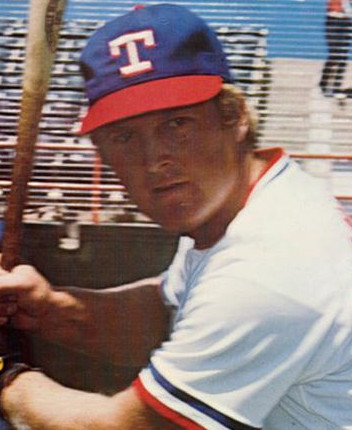
- Outfielder
- Born: March 7, 1951 (age 75); Long Beach, California, U.S.
- Batted: Right Threw: Right

MLB debut
- July 20, 1970, for the Washington Senators

Last MLB appearance
- October 6, 1985, for the Toronto Blue Jays

MLB statistics
- Batting average: .261
- Home runs: 240
- Runs batted in: 882
- Stats at Baseball Reference

Teams
- Washington Senators / Texas Rangers (1970–1976); Atlanta Braves (1977–1980); Seattle Mariners (1981); Oakland Athletics (1982–1984); Toronto Blue Jays (1985)

Career highlights and awards
- 2× All-Star (1974, 1978); AL MVP (1974); AL RBI leader (1974)

Jeffrey Alan Burroughs (born March 7, 1951) is an American former professional baseball player. He played as an outfielder in Major League Baseball from 1970 through 1985, for the Washington Senators / Texas Rangers (1970–76), Atlanta Braves (1977–80), Seattle Mariners (1981), Oakland Athletics (1982–84) and Toronto Blue Jays (1985).

A two-time All-Star player, Burroughs was the first overall pick in the 1969 Major League Baseball draft and was notable for being the 1974 American League RBI champion and for being named the American League's Most Valuable Player that same year. He is the father of former major league third baseman Sean Burroughs.

In a 16-season career, Burroughs posted a .261 batting average with 240 home runs and 882 RBI in 1,689 games.

== Early life ==
Burroughs was born to Charles Douglas and Iona Mae Burroughs in Long Beach, California, on March 7, 1951. He attended Woodrow Wilson Classical High School.

== Career ==
Burroughs was selected by the Washington Senators with the first overall pick in the 1969 Major League Baseball draft. He made his major league debut with the Senators on July 20, 1970, at the age of 19. He started the game in right field and was 0-for-3 in Washington's 2–0 win. Considered a "good bat-no field" kind of player, Burroughs was a considerable slugging threat during his playing days. Defensively, he was capable but slow.

In four full seasons with the Texas Rangers, Burroughs averaged 25.5 home runs a year with a high of 30 home runs in 1973. His most productive season came in 1974, when he batted .301 with 25 home runs and a league-leading and career-high 118 RBI in 152 games. He was voted the American League MVP, making him one of only seven overall number-one draft picks to win the MVP title (the others are Chipper Jones, Alex Rodriguez, Ken Griffey Jr., Bryce Harper, Joe Mauer and Josh Hamilton) and the first Ranger to win the award. During the 1974 season, Burroughs was at the center of the violent Ten Cent Beer Night debacle at Cleveland Stadium, where Burroughs was one of the targets of thrown objects and a few punches by unruly and inebriated Cleveland fans, in a game that was forfeited to Texas.

Burroughs was selected an All-Star in both 1974 with the Rangers and 1978 as a member of the Atlanta Braves, when he entered the All-Star break with a National League-leading .324 batting average. Burroughs was also named AL Player of the Year and selected as an OF on the AL All-Star team by The Sporting News his MVP season of 1974.

On December 9, 1976, Burroughs was acquired by the Braves in a five-for-one trade that sent Ken Henderson, Dave May, Roger Moret, Adrian Devine, Carl Morton and $200,000 to the Rangers.

As a member of the Braves, in 1977, Burroughs batted .271 with 41 home runs and 114 RBI in 154 games. His 41 home runs trailed only Cincinnati Reds outfielder George Foster (52) for the major league lead. Burroughs had fans who maintained a large banner below the right field deck titled "Jeff's Jackpot", which displayed his home run total for the season plus one.

On March 8, 1981, Burroughs was traded to the Seattle Mariners in exchange for relief pitcher Carlos Diaz. In his only season with Seattle, he batted .254 with 10 home runs and 41 RBI in 89 games.

Late in his career, Burroughs was used mainly as a designated hitter and pinch hitter. Burroughs played his final year with the Toronto Blue Jays in 1985 after being purchased by them. In 86 games, he had 49 hits, 19 runs, six home runs and 28 RBI, along with 36 strikeouts and 34 walks. He batted .257 with a .366 on-base percentage (OBP). His final regular season game was on October 6, 1985, batting as a DH. He went 1-for-4 with two strikeouts in an 8–0 loss to the New York Yankees, in which he struck out as the final out of Phil Niekro's 300th career win. He made his first and only appearance in a postseason game, having one at-bat in the ALCS that year, batting in Game 7 in the bottom of the ninth inning against the Kansas City Royals as a pinch hitter, which resulted in a ground out.

== Post-playing career ==
Burroughs is the father of Sean Burroughs, who also played in the major leagues.

After he retired, Burroughs coached his son's Little League team, the Long Beach All-Stars. These teams won the Little League World Series in both 1992 and 1993, winning the former by forfeit after their opponents (who had beaten them 15–4) were found to have used no fewer than 14 ineligible players and the latter 3–2 over Panama to be the first American team to repeat as champion and only the third city to ever do so after Monterrey, Mexico (1957, 1958) and Seoul, South Korea (1984, 1985).

== See also ==
- List of Major League Baseball career home run leaders
- List of second-generation Major League Baseball players
- List of Major League Baseball annual runs batted in leaders
