= Ken Henderson =

American baseball player (born 1946)

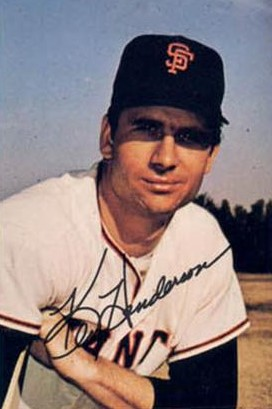
- Outfielder
- Born: June 15, 1946 (age 80); Carroll, Iowa, U.S.
- Batted: Switch Threw: Right

MLB debut
- April 23, 1965, for the San Francisco Giants

Last MLB appearance
- July 19, 1980, for the Chicago Cubs

MLB statistics
- Batting average: .257
- Home runs: 122
- Runs batted in: 576
- Stats at Baseball Reference

Teams
- San Francisco Giants (1965–1972); Chicago White Sox (1973–1975); Atlanta Braves (1976); Texas Rangers (1977); New York Mets (1978); Cincinnati Reds (1978–1979); Chicago Cubs (1979–1980)

Kenneth Joseph Henderson (born June 15, 1946) is an American former professional baseball player. He played in Major League Baseball as an outfielder from 1965 through 1980 for the San Francisco Giants, Chicago White Sox, Atlanta Braves, Texas Rangers, New York Mets, Cincinnati Reds and the Chicago Cubs.

== Career ==
Henderson was born in Carroll, Iowa and attended Clairemont High School in San Diego, California. He was signed by the San Francisco Giants as an amateur free agent on June 20, 1964. He made his major league debut with the Giants on April 23, 1965 at the age of 18. Henderson helped the Giants to win the National League Western Division (NL West) in 1971 and the Reds to win the NL West in 1979. He was acquired along with Steve Stone by the White Sox from the Giants for Tom Bradley on November 29, 1972.

Henderson finished 19th in voting for the 1974 American League MVP for playing in all 162 Games and having 602 At Bats, 76 Runs, 176 Hits, 35 Doubles, 5 Triples, 20 Home Runs, 95 RBI, 12 Stolen Bases, 66 Walks, .292 Batting Average, .360 On-base percentage, .467 Slugging Percentage, 281 Total Bases, 2 Sacrifice Hits, 8 Sacrifice Flies and 9 Intentional Walks.

Henderson spent each of three straight seasons from 1976 through 1978 with different ballclubs. First from the White Sox to the Braves with Dick Ruthven and Dan Osborn for Ralph Garr and Larvell Blanks on December 12, 1975. Then to the Rangers in a five-for-one trade with Dave May, Roger Moret, Adrian Devine, Carl Morton and $200,000 for Jeff Burroughs on December 9, 1976. Finally to the Mets on March 15, 1978 to complete the first four-team blockbuster deal in Major League Baseball history from three months prior on December 8, 1977 that also involved the Braves, Pittsburgh Pirates and a total of eleven players changing teams. The Mets also got from the Rangers Tom Grieve and from the Braves Willie Montañez. The Rangers received Al Oliver and Nelson Norman from the Pirates and Jon Matlack from the Mets. Adrian Devine, Tommy Boggs and Eddie Miller were traded from the Rangers to the Braves. The Pirates acquired Bert Blyleven from the Rangers and John Milner from the Mets.

== Career statistics ==
In a sixteen-year major league career, Henderson played in 1,444 games, accumulating 1,168 hits in 4,553 at bats for a .257 career batting average along with 122 home runs, 576 runs batted in and a .343 on-base percentage. He ended his career with a .977 fielding percentage.

== Personal ==
Henderson went to Clairemont High School in San Diego, CA.

Henderson's cousin, Kerry Dineen, was an outfielder with the New York Yankees in the 1970s.

Preceded by Billy Williams	Major League Player of the Month; August, 1972	Succeeded by Jerry Koosman
