= Al Oliver =

American baseball player (born 1946)

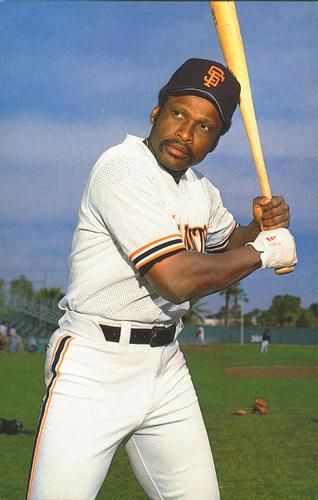
- Oliver with the San Francisco Giants in 1984
- Outfielder / First baseman
- Born: October 14, 1946 (age 79); Portsmouth, Ohio, U.S.
- Batted: Left Threw: Left

MLB debut
- September 23, 1968, for the Pittsburgh Pirates

Last MLB appearance
- October 5, 1985, for the Toronto Blue Jays

MLB statistics
- Batting average: .303
- Hits: 2,743
- Home runs: 219
- Runs batted in: 1,326
- Stats at Baseball Reference

Teams
- Pittsburgh Pirates (1968–1977); Texas Rangers (1978–1981); Montreal Expos (1982–1983); San Francisco Giants (1984); Philadelphia Phillies (1984); Los Angeles Dodgers (1985); Toronto Blue Jays (1985)

Career highlights and awards
- 7× All-Star (1972, 1975, 1976, 1980–1983); World Series champion (1971); 3× Silver Slugger Award (1980–1982); NL batting champion (1982); NL RBI leader (1982); Pittsburgh Pirates Hall of Fame

Albert Oliver Jr. (born October 14, 1946) is an American former professional baseball player. He played in Major League Baseball as an outfielder and first baseman from 1968 through 1985, most notably as a member of the Pittsburgh Pirates teams that won five National League Eastern Division titles in six years between 1970 and 1975 and, won the World Series in 1971. A seven-time All-Star, Oliver was the 1982 National League batting champion and RBI champion as a member of the Montreal Expos. Oliver surpassed the .300 batting average mark eleven times during his playing career and was also a three-time Silver Slugger Award winner. He led either league in games played, batting average, hits, doubles, RBI and total bases at least once in his career.

After 10 seasons with the Pirates, Oliver played for the Texas Rangers (1978–1981), Montreal Expos (1982–1983), San Francisco Giants (1984), Philadelphia Phillies (1984), Los Angeles Dodgers (1985), and Toronto Blue Jays (1985), over the course of his 18-year MLB career. Nicknamed "Scoop", Oliver batted and threw left-handed. He was inducted into the Pittsburgh Pirates Hall of Fame in 2025.

== Pittsburgh Pirates ==
Oliver attended Portsmouth High School in Portsmouth, Ohio where he was teammates with future Major Leaguer Larry Hisle. Oliver was a star basketball player and earned a scholarship to play college basketball for the Kent State Golden Flashes men's basketball team. However, before beginning college in 1964, he attended a tryout camp for the Philadelphia Phillies and one for the Pittsburgh Pirates in Salem, Virginia. His father, who wanted him to attend college, allowed him to sign with the Pirates at 17 years old for $5,000.

Oliver was promoted to the Major Leagues on September 14, 1968, the day his father, Al Oliver Sr., died. He appeared in 4 games that season. In his official rookie season, Oliver batted .285 with 17 home runs and drove in 70 runs, placing second in the 1969 National League Rookie of the Year voting. The following season, 1970, Oliver hit .270 and was fifth in the NL with seven sacrifice flies. He also finished second in the league with the 14 times he was hit by a pitch (the previous year he was plunked 12 times, fourth in the league). The Pirates won the National League East title for their first trip to the postseason since winning the 1960 World Series. However, they lost to the Cincinnati Reds in the 1970 National League Championship Series.

On September 1, 1971, the Pirates fielded what is believed to be the first all-black lineup in the history of the league. Oliver played first base, joining second baseman Rennie Stennett, center fielder Gene Clines, right fielder Roberto Clemente, left fielder Willie Stargell, catcher Manny Sanguillén, third baseman Dave Cash, shortstop Jackie Hernández and pitcher Dock Ellis in the starting lineup. Oliver ended the season with a .282 average, including 31 doubles (8th in the NL), seven triples (10th), 10 sacrifice flies (2nd), and five hit-by-pitches (good for 9th in the league). After beating the San Francisco Giants in the 1971 National League Championship Series, the Pirates won the World Series, beating the Baltimore Orioles in seven games with Oliver as their regular center fielder.

In 1972, Oliver raised his batting average to .312, good for sixth in the league. He hit 12 home runs with 89 RBI (10th in the NL). He scored 88 runs (8th in the league) and totalled 176 hits, which was also 8th in the NL. Oliver was named to his first All-Star game while finishing seventh in the NL MVP voting. In 1973, Oliver hit 20 home runs and drove in 99 runs (7th in the NL) while batting .292. Again he was among the league-leaders in hits (191, fifth in the NL), total bases (303, fifth in NL), doubles (38, second in NL), triples (7, eighth in NL), sacrifice flies (nine, 3rd in NL) and extra-base hits with 65, which put him in the top ten for the first of his five times in the league's top ten in that category. The Pirates won their third consecutive NL East title, however, they lost to the Reds 3 games to 2 in the NLCS. The Pirates offense led the National League in batting average with a .274 average and led the NL with 1505 hits.

In 1974, Oliver hit .321 with 198 hits, which were second and fourth in the National League respectively. He also hit 38 doubles and 12 triples, which were both second best in the NL. Oliver was seventh in NL MVP voting for the second time in three years. About Oliver, Willie Stargell said, "When it came to hitting ... all he ever did was crush the ball. Al was the perfect number three hitter because you knew he was going to make contact". He had a 23-game hitting streak in 1974 and another streak of 21 games where he got at least one hit. The Pirates won the NL East but lost to the Dodgers 3 games to 1 in the NLCS. The Pirates offense, known as the "Pittsburgh Lumber Company" again led the NL in hitting with 1560 hits and a .274 team batting average.

Oliver's 90 runs in 1975 was tenth in the NL as he hit .280 with 18 home runs and 84 RBI and played in the All-Star game for the second time. He tied a personal mark with 65 extra base hits, which was good for 5th in the NL, 39 of which were doubles, which put him third in the NL in that category. He was named as an outfielder on The Sporting News 1975 NL All-Star Team. The Pirates won the NL East again, but were swept by the Cincinnati Reds 3 games to none in the NLCS.

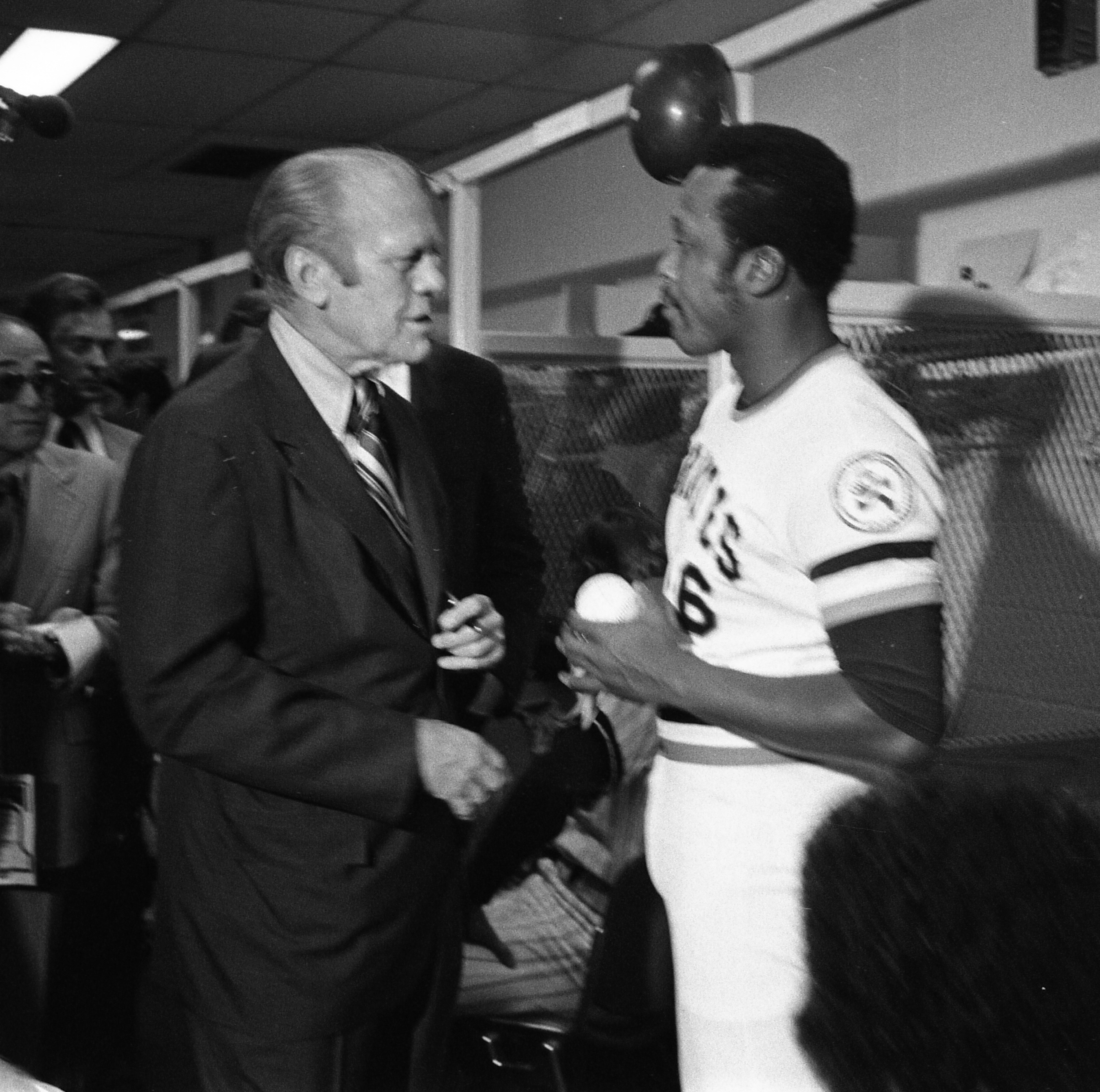
Oliver speaks with then-President Gerald Ford prior to the 1976 All-Star Game

In 1976 Oliver hit .323; this was his first of nine straight .300+ seasons. He played in the All-Star game once again, batting .360 at the break, but an inner ear infection sidelined him in the second half, and prevented him from finishing in the top 10 in batting categories. He was voted the National League Player of the Month for June. In 1977, as part of the so-called "Pittsburgh Lumber Company", Oliver hit .308 (tenth in the NL) with 19 home runs and 82 RBI. His 175 hits were 10th in the NL. He also stole a career-high 13 bases, although he was thrown out 16 times along the way. His 8 sacrifice flies were fifth in the league as well.

== Texas Rangers ==
Oliver was traded along with Nelson Norman from the Pirates to the Rangers in the first four-team blockbuster deal in Major League Baseball history on December 8, 1977, that also involved the Atlanta Braves, New York Mets and a total of eleven players changing teams. The Rangers also received Jon Matlack from the Mets. The Pirates acquired Bert Blyleven from the Rangers and John Milner from the Mets. Going to the Braves from the Rangers were Adrian Devine, Tommy Boggs and Eddie Miller. The Mets got from the Braves Willie Montañez and from the Rangers Tom Grieve and Ken Henderson who was sent to New York to complete the transaction three months later on March 15, 1978.

In 1978 Oliver was second in the AL with a .324 batting average, and his 170 hits were good for eighth in the league, and his 35 doubles were sixth in the league. The next season, 1979, Oliver hit .323, good for fifth in the league (the fifth time he had finished among his league's top ten in batting).

Wearing the number 0 on his uniform (being the first player in the major leagues to do so,) Oliver played in all of Texas's 163 games in 1980, and reached career highs in hits (209, fourth in the AL), doubles (43, second in the AL) and RBI (117, fourth in the AL) while batting .319, which was eighth in the American League. He was voted to the AL All-Star team for the first time. Oliver was the outfielder on The Sporting News 1980 AL Silver Slugger Team. On August 17 at Tiger Stadium, he established an American League record with 21 total bases in a doubleheader (four home runs, a double and a triple).

On May 23, 1979, and August 17, 1980, Oliver hit 3 home runs in each game, the first against the Minnesota Twins in a 7–2 win and a year later against the Detroit Tigers in the second game of a doubleheader in a 12–6 victory.(He added another in the 1st game, to make it 4 in the double header. In between games, the Tigers' retired Al Kaline's #6)

In 1981 Oliver was ninth in the AL with a .309 average, sixth in hits with 130, and second in doubles with 29, while playing in the All-Star game (his fifth). He also won his second consecutive Silver Slugger Award as the best hitter at his position, which in 1981 was designated hitter. He became the first player to win Silver Slugger Awards at two different positions. He also became the Rangers' all-time leading hitter (.319) and reached the club's top ten in virtually every offensive category.

== Montreal Expos ==
Oliver wanted an extension to his contract of which he was paid $320,000 annually and had four years remaining, but asked to be traded after Rangers management rejected his renegotiation request. He was set to be dealt to the New York Yankees for Oscar Gamble, Bob Watson and Mike Morgan prior to the 1982 regular season. Gamble's contract listed eight teams to which he could be traded, not including the Rangers, so the deal was squashed. Oliver was sent to the Montreal Expos for Larry Parrish and Dave Hostetler on March 31, 1982, instead. He became the Expos' starting first baseman.

In 1982 with the Expos, Oliver hit a career-high .331 batting average to win the National League batting crown. He also led the NL in hits (204), doubles (43), extra bases (67), and total bases (317), and tied with Dale Murphy for the RBI lead with 109. His 43 doubles tied his 1980 career-high, and his 67 extra base hits was also a career-high as well as his 22 home runs, breaking his 1973 personal best. In addition to playing in his sixth All-Star game, he was third in the NL MVP voting and won his third consecutive Silver Slugger Award, this time as a first baseman. He was also the first baseman on The Sporting News' NL All-Star Team. He was voted the Montreal Expos Player of the Year at the end of the season.

In 1983 Oliver led the NL in doubles with 38 and was fourth in the NL in hits with 184. He hit .300 once again and topped the 2500 career hit level (August 10, 1983, off Mets' pitcher Carlos Diaz). and Oliver was selected for his seventh All-Star game, starting at first base in the 1983 Classic.

== Giants, Phillies, Dodgers, and Blue Jays (1984–85) ==
On February 27, 1984, Oliver was traded to the San Francisco Giants for Fred Breining and Max Venable. The San Francisco Giants later sent Andy McGaffigan to the Montreal Expos to complete the trade. Later that same year, on August 20, 1984, he was again traded, this time with Renie Martin to the Philadelphia Phillies for Kelly Downs and George Riley.

In the 1985 offseason, Oliver was traded by the Phillies to the Los Angeles Dodgers for Pat Zachry. Then, on July 9, 1985, he was traded by the Los Angeles Dodgers to the Toronto Blue Jays for Len Matuszek. With the Blue Jays, Oliver delivered two game-winning hits in the first four games of the 1985 American League Championship Series against Kansas City. However, the Royals rallied to win the last three games. In the seventh and deciding game, the lefty Oliver started as the DH against right-hander Bret Saberhagen. But after pitching three scoreless innings, Saberhagen departed the game due to injury. Lefty Charlie Leibrandt was inserted, thus giving the Royals the platoon advantage. Right-handed batter Cliff Johnson pinch hit for Oliver, and struck out, ending a Blue Jays rally. Oliver was caught by TV cameras angrily scowling in the dugout, knowing his night—and as it turned out, his season and career—were over. Oliver batted .375 for the series. He is one of the few players to play for both major league Canadian teams, the Toronto Blue Jays and the Montreal Expos.

Oliver claims that he was forced to retire due to collusion. Courts ruled that there was collusion among baseball owners in the mid-1980s, which included Oliver (and nine others) when a judge ruled that he was entitled to $680,031.05 in 1995.

Several players, including Kirk Gibson, were allowed to file for free agency a second time because of the court order based on the "collusion" finding. Oliver himself believes that he could have played four or five more years. Andre Dawson said, "Al, as a lifetime .300 hitter after 18 seasons, I feel is deserving of induction into the Baseball Hall of Fame. There is no question in my mind had he not been forced out of the game by collusion, had he been given an all-out honest attempt to achieve 3,000 hits, he would have done it. He was pushed out of the game when he was still a .300 hitter. I feel he deserves a place in baseball today."

== Career stats ==
Games	PA	AB	Runs	Hits	2B	3B	HR	RBI	SB	BB	SO	Avg.	Slg.	OBP	OPS	Fld%
2368	9778	9049	1189	2743	529	77	219	1326	84	535	756	.303	.451	.344	.795	.986

Oliver batted .300 or more eleven times. His 2,743 career hits rank 58th on the all-time list. In the time of his career, he was third in hits among all players, behind Pete Rose and Rod Carew. He also ranks among all-time top 50 in games played (2368), total bases (4083), RBI (1326) and extra-base hits (825). He was among the league's top ten in doubles nine times and among the league's top ten in hits nine times as well and finished in the top ten in batting average nine times. Five times he was among the league's top ten in total bases and four times he was in the top ten in RBIs. Because of these feats, his name has been mentioned more than once as a possible inductee into the Baseball Hall of Fame.

Oliver hit the last home run at Forbes Field. His shot came off Milt Pappas in the sixth inning of the last game played at the stadium, the second game of a June 28, 1970, doubleheader against the Chicago Cubs. He also drove in the first run ever scored at Three Rivers Stadium. His first-inning double off Gary Nolan drove in Richie Hebner in that stadium's inaugural game, on July 16 of that same 1970 season. However, the Cincinnati Reds defeated the Pirates 3–2 .

== Personal life ==
His son, Aaron Oliver, played football for the Texas A&M University team that won the 1998 Big 12 Conference Championship. Aaron, a four-year letterman and three-year starter, caught the first touchdown pass in Big 12 history.

On April 22, 2013, the Portsmouth City Council unanimously passed a resolution recognizing and appointing Al Oliver as "Mr. Ambassador" for the City of Portsmouth in recognition of his various efforts on behalf of the community and southern Ohio.

Oliver is portrayed on one of the Floodwall Murals in Portsmouth, Ohio, honoring local Major League Baseball players, scouts, and umpires.

In September 2014, Oliver released his second book, titled Life is a Hit, Don't Strike Out that chronicled his life and career.

== See also ==
- List of Major League Baseball career hits leaders
- List of Major League Baseball career doubles leaders
- List of Major League Baseball career runs scored leaders
- List of Major League Baseball career runs batted in leaders
- List of Major League Baseball career total bases leaders
- List of Major League Baseball annual runs batted in leaders
- List of Major League Baseball batting champions
- List of Major League Baseball annual doubles leaders

Preceded by George Foster; Tim Wallach	National League Player of the Month; June 1976; June 1982	Succeeded by George Foster; Mike Schmidt
