= Dave May =

American baseball player (1943–2012)

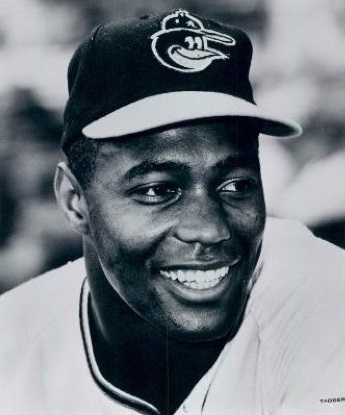
- Outfielder
- Born: December 23, 1943; New Castle, Delaware, U.S.
- Died: October 20, 2012 (aged 68); Bear, Delaware, U.S.
- Batted: Left Threw: Right

MLB debut
- July 28, 1967, for the Baltimore Orioles

Last MLB appearance
- October 1, 1978, for the Pittsburgh Pirates

MLB statistics
- Batting average: .251
- Home runs: 96
- Runs batted in: 422
- Stats at Baseball Reference

Teams
- Baltimore Orioles (1967–1970); Milwaukee Brewers (1970–1974); Atlanta Braves (1975–1976); Texas Rangers (1977); Milwaukee Brewers (1978); Pittsburgh Pirates (1978)

Career highlights and awards
- All-Star (1973); Milwaukee Brewers Wall of Honor

David LaFrance May (December 23, 1943 – October 20, 2012) was an American professional baseball player. He played in Major League Baseball as an outfielder from 1967 through 1978 for the Baltimore Orioles, Milwaukee Brewers, Atlanta Braves, Texas Rangers and the Pittsburgh Pirates. May was a member of the AL pennant winning Orioles team in 1969 and, was an American League All-Star player with the Brewers in 1973. He was the father of MLB scout David May Jr. and MLB player Derrick May.

== Biography ==
A native of New Castle, Delaware, he graduated from William Penn High School. He signed with the San Francisco Giants as an amateur free agent in 1961. He batted left-handed and threw right-handed, and was listed as 5 feet 10 inches (1.78 m) tall and 186 pounds (84 kg). The only year he spent in the Giants organization was in 1962 with the Salem Rebels, in which he led the team with a .379 batting average.

May appeared in his first Major League game with the Baltimore Orioles. During the time he was with Baltimore (1967–1970), he never had higher than a .242 batting average and 152 at bats. He was dealt from the Orioles to the Brewers for Dick Baney and Buzz Stephen before the trade deadline on June 15, 1970. However, upon coming to the Brewers, he became an effective hitter. In his first full season in Milwaukee, 1971, May hit 16 home runs and had 65 RBI, and batted .277. After an off year in 1972, he rebounded to finish eighth in the MVP voting in 1973 with a .303 batting average, 25 home runs, and 93 RBI. He also led the league in total bases, and placed in second in hits. May is one of two Delawareans to make the All-Star Game. However, his production declined in 1974, so the Brewers traded him to the Atlanta Braves for Hank Aaron.

May was part of a five-for-one trade that sent him, Ken Henderson, Roger Moret, Adrian Devine, Carl Morton and $200,000 from the Braves to the Rangers for Jeff Burroughs on December 9, 1976. May was traded back to Milwaukee at trade deadline in 1978 to help the team on a pennant push. As the Brewers faded, he was traded just before the August waiver wire deadline to the Pittsburgh Pirates.

May went to spring training with the Philadelphia Phillies and was their final cut before the 1979 season. He signed and played for Santo Domingo in the fledgling Inter-American League until it went defunct during the 1979 season. May then became a minor league coach, serving as a roving hitting instructor for the Atlanta Braves in 1981 and 1982

May was inducted into the Delaware Sports Museum and Hall of Fame in 1984.

May died at age 68 in Bear, Delaware, on October 20, 2012.
