= Roger Moret =

Puerto Rican baseball player (1949–2020)

Rogelio Moret
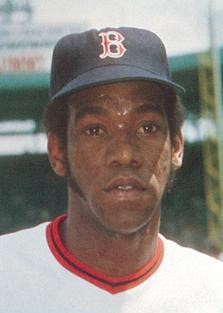
- Pitcher
- Born: September 16, 1949; Guayama, Puerto Rico
- Died: December 7, 2020 (aged 71); Guayama, Puerto Rico
- Batted: Switch Threw: Left

MLB debut
- September 13, 1970, for the Boston Red Sox

Last MLB appearance
- June 16, 1978, for the Texas Rangers

MLB statistics
- Win–loss record: 47–27
- Earned run average: 3.66
- Strikeouts: 408
- Stats at Baseball Reference

Teams
- Boston Red Sox (1970–1975); Atlanta Braves (1976); Texas Rangers (1977–1978)

Rogelio "Roger" Moret Torres (September 16, 1949 – December 7, 2020) was a Puerto Rican professional baseball player. He played in Major League Baseball as a pitcher from 1970 to 1976 and in 1978 for the Boston Red Sox, Atlanta Braves, and the Texas Rangers. Tall and slender, the left-hander was listed as 6 feet 4 inches (1.93 m) tall and 170 pounds (77 kg).

== Career ==
In 168 games pitched (82 as a starter and 86 as a reliever), Moret posted a career win–loss record of 47–27 and an earned run average of 3.66. He notched 24 complete games, five hits, and 12 saves. He allowed 656 hits and 339 bases on balls in 7231/3 innings pitched, with 408 strikeouts. Moret led the American League in winning percentage in both 1973 (.867) and 1975 (.824). On August 21, 1974, he hurled a complete-game, one-hit shutout against the Chicago White Sox. An infield single by Chicago slugger Dick Allen in the seventh inning spoiled the no-hitter bid. Moret walked two hitters and fanned 12.

Moret was a member of the 1975 American League champion Red Sox. After winning 14 of 17 decisions during the regular season in 36 games (including 16 starts), he appeared in four postseason contests. In the ALCS, he was the winning pitcher in relief of Reggie Cleveland in Game 2 against the Oakland Athletics, hurling a scoreless sixth inning and earning the victory when Boston broke a 3–3 tie in their half of the frame. Then, in the 1975 World Series, Moret worked in three games, including the legendary Game 6. He held the Cincinnati Reds scoreless in 12/3 innings pitched, although he allowed two hits and three bases on balls, one of those intentional. He was traded to the Braves for Tom House a little more than seven weeks after the conclusion of the Fall Classic on December 12, 1975. At the time, the Braves needed more starting pitching of which the Red Sox had a surplus. Nearly one year later on December 9, 1976, Moret was part of a five-for-one trade that sent him, Ken Henderson, Dave May, Adrian Devine, Carl Morton, and $200,000 from the Braves to the Rangers for Jeff Burroughs.

Scheduled to be the starting pitcher against the Detroit Tigers on April 12, 1978, Moret was spotted in the Rangers locker room in a catatonic state, with his arm extended holding a slipper. He was unresponsive to examiners, and was immediately taken to a psychiatric facility and placed on the disabled list. He appeared in only six more games after the incident. In the film Fever Pitch, the incident was cited as an instance where the Curse of the Bambino struck the Red Sox, but this is an error, as Moret was no longer with that team.

Moret died on December 7, 2020, in his hometown of Guayama, Puerto Rico, from cancer, at age 71.
