= Eddie Miller (outfielder) =

American baseball player (born 1957)

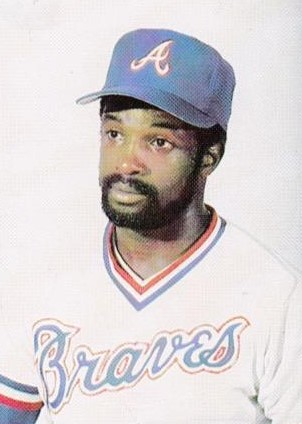
- Outfielder
- Born: June 29, 1957 (age 68); San Pablo, California, U.S.
- Batted: Both Threw: Right

MLB debut
- September 5, 1977, for the Texas Rangers

Last MLB appearance
- September 30, 1984, for the San Diego Padres

MLB statistics
- Batting average: .238
- Home runs: 1
- Runs batted in: 17
- Stats at Baseball Reference

Teams
- Texas Rangers (1977); Atlanta Braves (1978–1981); Detroit Tigers (1982); San Diego Padres (1984)

Edward Lee Miller (born June 29, 1957) is an American former professional baseball player. He played in Major League Baseball (MLB) as an outfielder for four different teams, primarily the Atlanta Braves, during 1977–1984. Listed at 5 feet 9 inches (1.75 m) and 175 pounds (79 kg), he batted as a switch hitter and threw left-handed.

== Career ==
Miller was born in San Pablo, California. He was selected by the Texas Rangers in the second round of the 1975 MLB draft out of Harry Ells High School in Richmond, California.

Miller's professional career spanned 1975 to 1990, first reaching Triple-A in 1978. He played in 902 minor league baseball games and also played parts of four seasons in the Mexican League.

Miller appeared in a total of 138 MLB games during parts of seven seasons. He played a career-high 50 major-league games with the 1981 Atlanta Braves. He had a .286 batting average (79-for-332) for his MLB career, with only eight extra base hits. His only major-league home run came in his final major-league at bat.

Miller was part of the first four-team blockbuster deal in major-league history on December 8, 1977. The trade sent Miller and two other players from the Rangers to the Braves, and also involved the Pittsburgh Pirates and New York Mets with a total of 11 players changing teams.

== See also ==
- List of Major League Baseball players with a home run in their final major league at bat
